= Zebra (film) =

2024 Indian Telugu action thriller film

- Theatrical release poster
- Directed by: Eashvar Karthic
- Screenplay by: Eashvar Karthic; Yuva
- Dialogues by: Meeraqh
- Story by: Eashvar Karthic
- Produced by: Bala Sundaram; Dinesh Sundaram
- Starring: Satyadev; Dhananjaya; Sunil; Satya; Priya Bhavani Shankar; Jeniffer Piccinato; Sathyaraj
- Cinematography: Sathya Ponmar
- Edited by: Anil Krish
- Music by: Ravi Basrur
- Production company: Old Town Pictures
- Release date: 22 November 2024
- Running time: 164 minutes
- Country: India
- Language: Telugu
- Box office: est.₹10 crore

Zebra is 2024 Indian Telugu-language action thriller film directed by Eashvar Karthic, who co-wrote with Yuva. The film has an ensemble cast of Satyadev, Dhananjaya, Sunil, Satya, Priya Bhavani Shankar, Jeniffer Piccinato and Sathyaraj. The music is composed by Ravi Basrur.

Zebra was released on 22 November 2024.

== Plot ==
Surya Kancharana and Swathi Navvaluri are a couple working in two different banks.

One day, Swathi makes a serious mistake at work: she accidentally deposits a client's ₹400,000 into the wrong account, and the recipient refuses to return the money. Fearing that she will lose her job and her career, Swathi begs the client not to file an official complaint and offers to compensate him herself. Surya decides to help her. Exploiting a loophole in his own bank's system, he manages to steal the same amount and pays the client, resolving the issue temporarily.

To replace the money he stole, Surya searches for the mistaken recipient, Benny D’Souza, hoping to get the funds back. He forges Benny's signature, prepares a withdrawal slip, and successfully withdraws ₹400,000 from Benny's account at another bank. He then deposits the money back into his own bank to cover the missing amount.

However, Surya is soon summoned by his boss, who accuses him of theft. Benny has filed an official complaint—not for ₹400,000, but for ₹80 million—claiming that Surya stole the entire amount from his account. Transaction records indeed show that ₹80 million was transferred to Surya's bank, then split into thousands of smaller transactions across various accounts, making recovery impossible. Surya insists he has no connection to the account (which is under his name) and alleges that someone stole his identity to open the account and launder money. Branch manager Sheela, who has long held a grudge against Surya, demands that he be fired and handed over to the police, but his boss grants him a short window to prove his innocence.

Surya visits Benny, only to discover that the latter has recently died in an accident. Moments later, Surya is abducted and taken to gangster Aditya “Aadhi” Devaraj. Aadhi reveals that Benny worked for him and that the stolen ₹80 million belonged to him. He gives Surya four days to return the money, or he will kill Surya's entire family.

Desperate, Surya turns to Baba, a broker with connections to various illegal businesses and a reputation as a compulsive gambler. Baba claims to have insider information about the stock market and promises that if Surya can gather enough money to invest, he can help him win the ₹80 million.

Meanwhile, Swathi has joined Surya's bank. Together, they steal money from the accounts of deceased clients to fund the investment. Surya is about to hand the money to Baba when his boss grows suspicious and attempts to inspect those accounts. Surya is forced to abandon the plan and quickly return every rupee before his boss discovers the theft.

Cornered, Surya decides to rob his own bank. With help from Swathi and his friend Bob, they trigger the fire alarm, creating a fake emergency. While the bank is fully evacuated, Surya manages to steal several hundred thousand rupees from the vault. He hands the money to Baba, who successfully executes his plan and wins the ₹80 million, which he then sends to Aadhi.

When Surya returns to the bank to put the stolen money back, he learns that his boss has already discovered the heist. The building is shut down, and all employees are searched. In a last attempt to escape blame, Surya sneaks into Sheela's office and hides the stolen money in her safe. When the money is later found there, Sheela is fired and arrested.

== Cast ==
- Satyadev as Surya Kancharana "Pandu", Senior Relationship Manager of Bank of Trust, Gachibowli, Hyderabad
- Dhanajaya as Aditya "Aadhi" Devaraj
- Priya Bhavani Shankar as Swathi Navvaluri
- Jeniffer Piccinato as Sheela Chawla "Snake", Branch Manager of Bank of Trust, Gachibowli, Hyderabad
- Sunil as Madhan Gupta
- Satya as Bob "Buddy"
- Sathyaraj as Baba
- Suresh Chandra Menon as Military, Compliance Officer of Bank of Trust
- Temper Vamsi as Benny D'Souza
- Ravin Makhija as Pankaj
- Ramaraju as Tagore
- Surya as Abbu
- Sameer as Janaki Raman
- Prudhvi Raj as Shrungara Samaram, Branch Manager of KDFC Bank, Gachibowli, Hyderabad
- Usha Sree as Jennifer D'Souza, Benny D'Souza's wife
- Deepthi as Flora
- Raviteja as Paani
- Aziz Naser as RP
- Kancharapalem Raju
- Dheer Charan Srivastav
- Hima Varma as Lavanya
- Yogi Khatri
- Sarkar Khatri as Chotu
- Kalyani Natarajan as Surya's mother
- Amrutha Iyengar in a special appearance as Aaradya
- Ramachandra Raju in a special appearance as the Chief Minister

== Music ==
The music of the film is composed and scored by Ravi Basrur.

No.	Title	Lyrics	Singer(s)	Length
1.	"Teri Meri"	Purna Chary	Vijayalaxmi Mettinahole, Santhosh Venky	4:06
2.	"Tere Bina"	Krishna Kanth	Airaa Udupi, Santhosh Venky	3:12
3.	"Gaaya Laina"	Purna Chary	Santhosh Venky	3:40
4.	"Money Money"	Roll Rida	Roll Rida	3:18

== Release ==
The film was theatrically released on 22 November 2024. Post-theatrical digital streaming rights were acquired by Aha and premiered on 20 December 2024.

== Reception ==
Paul Nicodemus of The Times of India rated three stars out of five and stated that "Zebra is an entertaining action thriller that thrives on the electric performances of Satyadev and Dhananjaya." Sanjay Ponnappa of India Today wrote that "The climax sequence deserves a special shout-out, where the lead up delivers a thrilling culmination point." and rated three out of five stars. BH Harsh of Cinema Express stated that "Zebra just feels excruciatingly long and worn out" and rated two out of five stars.

Avinash Ramachandran of The Indian Express rated the film three out of five stars and wrote that "The film is essentially about how dubious the field of banking is, and the ease with which our hard-earned money does more work for the bank than for us. In many ways, Zebra is like an interesting PSA that asks us to read the fine print before operating a bank account." Kirubhakar Purushothaman of News18 gave it three out of five stars and wrote that "There's a lot to call out in Zebra--including the questionable depiction of a female character--but Eashvar Karthic and Yuva's speeding screenplay keeps you entertained and distracted."

Suhas Sistu of The Hans India gave it two and three-fourths out of five stars and wrote, "While the screenplay occasionally gets bogged down by subplots, the film’s core strength lies in its engaging concept and strong performances. With a sharper focus and crisper runtime, Zebra could have reached greater heights." Srivathsan Nadadhur of The Hindu wrote, "After a disappointing directorial debut with Penguin, Eashvar Karthic redeems himself with this clever financial thriller, ably supported by a committed bunch — on and off screen." Y Maheswara Reddy of Bangalore Mirror gave the film three out of five stars and opined that "Director Eashvar Karthic has succeeded in making a thrilling action-crime flick, giving equal screen space to Satyadev Kancharana and Dhananjay."
