= Jilebi (2017 film) =

- Film poster
- Directed by: 'Lucky' Shankar
- Written by: 'Lucky' Shankar
- Screenplay by: 'Lucky' Shankar
- Story by: 'Lucky' Shankar
- Produced by: 'Lucky' Shankar
- Starring: Pooja Gandhi; Yashas; Vijay Chendoor; Nagendra
- Cinematography: M. R. Seenu
- Edited by: R. D. Ravi
- Music by: James Architect
- Production company: Shivashankar Film Factory
- Release date: 3 March 2017
- Running time: 120 minutes
- Country: India
- Language: Kannada
- Budget: ₹1 crore (US$100,000)
- Box office: ₹3 crore (US$310,000)

Jilebi is a 2017 Indian Kannada language comedy thriller film written, directed and produced by Shankar. It stars Pooja Gandhi in the main role along with Yashas, Vijay Chandur and Nagendra. The soundtrack and score for the film is composed by James Architect. The cinematography is by M. R. Seenu.

The film has been certified A by the censor board. The filming was completed in the month of May 2016 and the film is scheduled for release on 3 March 2017.

The film Jilebi was released on 3 March, opened to positive reviews by the both critics and the audience. And the Indiaglitz called it an 'ALL TIME SWEET'.

== Cast ==
- Pooja Gandhi as 'Jilebi'
- Yashas Soorya as Soorya
- Vijay Chendoor
- Nagendra U. A.
- H. G. Dattatreya
- Tabla Nani
- Vijanath Biradar
- Shobharaj as Police Inspector
- Mithra
- Rockline Sudhakar

== Synopsis ==
The film begins with a steamy sequence inside a sex worker's (Pooja Gandhi) house with her in the shower. Though, one is immediately shown another track of three friends who are now set to head to Dubai and how they want to have one last night of adult fun.

They take her to their bachelors room and celebrating one small party at night, all would be tightened by taking wine, at the same flat around sixty year old, who earlier was insulted by the Jilebi, where she appears in front of his flat, they start to argue each other during which he loses his patience and slapped her forcefully, she falls in to door wall and loses her life.

And she turns into a ghost but boys would be thinking of her mysterious death. They start to leave room and go to Dubai to escape from the death allegations by packing her body into a suitcase to dispose in midway and the director maintained the suspense till the end and left audience to think by showing it will be continued in the sequel.

The real story starts in the sequel Jilebi 2, which is already shooting in Dubai.

== Soundtrack ==
Jilebi

Soundtrack album by James Architect
- Recorded: 2016
- Genre: Feature film soundtrack
- Language: Kannada

James Architect, a debutant, has scored for the soundtrack of the film.

Track listing
No.	Title	Lyrics	Singer(s)	Length
1.	"Jilebi Jilebi Hudugi"	V. Nagendra Prasad	Jogi Sunitha	4:39
2.	"Mira Mira"	Thippeswamy	Anuradha Bhat	4:51
3.	"Ollevaru"	Lucky Shankar	Santhosh Venky	5:04
4.	"Jilebi Jilebi Hudugi Dj Mix"	V. Nagendra Prasad	Jogi Sunitha	4:21
Total length:				18:55

== Critical response ==
The writer, Sunanya Suresh of times of India stated that "Director Shankar's Jilebi from its promos looked like a raunchy comedy with a hint of a thriller. While Jilebi has good casting, the characters that these actors play goes amiss somewhere. Also, in an attempt to play to the gallery, one ends up seeing too much of cheesy, corny and sometimes unappetizing humour that seem strung together loosely with a story. This film is ideally meant only for those who look for some titillation on screen".

== Box office ==
The film Jilebi was performed fairly well at the sandalwood box office by collecting over ₹3 crore (US$310,000) on a production budget of ₹1 crore.
