= Gulshan Devaiah =

Indian actor (born 1978)

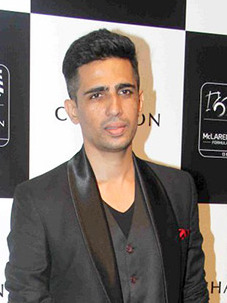
- Devaiah at an interview with Zoom (Indian TV channel) in 2024
- Born: Kambeyanda Devaiah Gulshan; 28 May 1978 (age 48); Bengaluru, Karnataka, India
- Occupation: Actor
- Years active: 2010–present
- Notable work: Hunterrr; Commando 3 Shaitan; Hate Story; Guns & Gulaabs
- Spouse: Kallirroi Tziafeta (m. 2012; div. 2020)

Gulshan Devaiah (born 28 May 1978) is an Indian actor who primarily appears in Hindi films. He is known for his roles in Shaitan, Hate Story and Hunterrr. His performance in Shaitan was critically praised and earned him a nomination for Filmfare Award for Best Male Debut. He has starred in web series such as Afsos, Duranga, Dahaad,Guns & Gulaabs and Bad Cops.

== Early and personal life ==
Devaiah was born on 28 May 1978 in Bengaluru, Karnataka, India into a Kodava family. He is a NIFT graduate. He is the son of Sri Devaiah and Pushpalata who were employed by Bharat Electronics Ltd. He completed his primary education at Cluny Convent and St Joseph's Indian High School. After graduation from NIFT, he got jobs in the fashion industry where he worked for 10 years. He also taught Bangalore students, fashion, at Wigan & Leigh College. Devaiah started his Bollywood journey with minor roles in Bangalore's English theatre. After he performed in several dramas, he moved to Mumbai for bigger opportunities.

He was married to actress Kallirroi Tziafeta, from Greece, from 2012 to 2020.

== Career ==
Devaiah started his career from the Anurag Kashyap's feature film That Girl in Yellow Boots, alongside Kalki Koechlin and Naseeruddin Shah in 2010. The film was screened at the Toronto International Film Festival, followed by the Venice Film Festival. He played the role of Chitiappa in the film. Next in 2011, he appeared in Rohan Sippy's crime thriller Dum Maaro Dum, starring Abhishek Bachchan, Bipasha Basu, Rana Daggubati and Prateik Babbar, where he played the role of Ricky. In the same year, Devaiah appeared in Bejoy Nambiar's Hindi thriller film Shaitan, starring Rajeev Khandelwal and Kalki Koechlin, where he portrayed the role of Karan Chaudhary "KC". Released in June 2011, the film was a critical and commercial success, where Devaiah's performance was acclaimed. He was nominated for the several awards including, Filmfare Awards, Screen Awards, Stardust Awards and Apsara Film & Television Producers Guild Awards in the category of Best Male Debut and Best Actor in a Supporting Role, along with other ensemble characters.

In 2012, Devaiah appeared in Vivek Agnihotri's erotic thriller Hate Story, produced by Vikram Bhatt, co-starring Paoli Dam. This was his first lead role, where he portrayed the antagonistic role of Siddharth Dhanrajgir, a cocky son of a rich business tycoon. The film went on to become a sleeper hit, and garnered the positive reviews from the critics. Taran Adarsh of Bollywood Hungama rated 3/5 to the film and labelled Devaiah's performance as "excellent". The same year, he played in Vasan Bala's crime thriller film Peddlers alongside Nimrat Kaur, where he portrayed the role of Ranjit D'souza, a 20-years old boy, who gets trapped in the drug trade. The film was premiered at the Cannes Film Festival, which was muted by the critics. In 2013, Devaiah appeared in Sanjay Leela Bhansali's romantic-tragedy drama film Ram-Leela, starring Ranveer Singh and Deepika Padukone, where he played the role of Bhavani, which was a 'blockbuster' in the year. After a year gap, In 2015, Devaiah appeared in Harshavardan Kulkarni's adult comedy film Hunterrr, co-starring Radhika Apte, where he portrayed the role of Mandar Ponkshe, a sex-addicted man and describing his lustful journey in life. The film did well at the box-office. In 2016, he was also seen playing the role of an NRI in Vivek Agnihotri's film Junooniyat. Devaiah signed 3 films in 2017, Cabaret, A Death in the Gunj and CandyFlip. He played double role of twin brothers Karate Mani and Jimmy in action comedy film Mard Ko Dard Nahi Hota for which he won Screen Award for Best Supporting Actor and was also nominated for Filmfare Award for Best Supporting Actor. He played the role of Buraq Ansari in action film Commando 3. In 2020 he appeared in Amazon Prime's drama series Afsos and Netflix original film Ghost Stories.

== Filmography ==
Key
†	Denotes films that have not yet been released

=== Films ===
- All films are in Hindi unless otherwise noted.

Year	Title	Role	Notes	Ref.
2004	Dil Ne Jise Apna Kahaa	DJ		
2010	That Girl in Yellow Boots	Chittiappa Siddanna Gowda		
2011	Dum Maaro Dum	Ricky		
2011	Shaitan	Karan 'KC' Chaudhary		
2012	Hate Story	Siddharth Dhanrajgir		
2012	Peddlers	Ranjit D'Souza		
2013	Goliyon Ki Raasleela Ram-Leela	Bhavani		
2015	Hunterrr	Mandar Ponkshe		
2016	Junooniyat	Yash		
2017	A Death In The Gunj	Nandan "Nandu" Bakshi		
2018	Mard Ko Dard Nahi Hota	Karate Mani & Jimmy	Double role	
2019	Cabaret	Gaurav		
2019	Commando 3	Buraq Ansari		
2019	CandyFlip	Altaf		
2020	Ghost Stories	Girl's Father		
2020	Unpaused	Ahan		
2020	Footfairy	Vivan Deshmukh		
2022	Badhaai Do	Guru Narayan		
2022	Blurr	Neel		
2023	8 A.M. Metro	Preetam		
2024	Ulajh	Nakul Bhatia / Humayun		
2024	Jhansi Ka Rajkumar	Rajkumar		
2025	Kantara: Chapter 1	Kulashekara	Kannada film	
2026	Maa Inti Bangaaram	Karuna	Telugu film	
2026	Little Thomas			

=== Television ===
Year	Title	Role	Ref.
2018	Smoke	Jairam "JJ" Jha	
2020	Afsos	Nakul	
2022	Duranga	Abhishek Banne	
2022	Shiksha Mandal	Aditya Ray	
2023	Dahaad	Devi Lal Singh	
2023	Guns & Gulaabs	4 Cut Atmaram	
2024	Bad Cop	Karan & Arjun	
2025	Perfect Family	Vishnu Karkaria	

=== Short film ===
Year	Title
2015	Nayantara's Necklace
2017	The Thought Of You
2020	The Sleepwalkers
2021	Dobara Alvida

== Awards and nominations ==
Year	Award	Work	Category	Result	Ref.
2012	Filmfare Awards	Dum Maaro Dum, Shaitan & That Girl in Yellow Boots	Best Male Debut	Nominated	
2012	Producers Guild Film Awards	Shaitan	Best Actor in a Supporting Role	Nominated	
2012	Screen Awards	Shaitan	Best Ensemble Cast	Nominated	
2020	Screen Awards	Mard Ko Dard Nahi Hota	Best Supporting Actor	Won	
2020	Filmfare Awards	Mard Ko Dard Nahi Hota	Best Supporting Actor	Nominated	
2023	Filmfare Awards	Badhaai Do	Best Supporting Actor	Nominated	
2023	2023 Filmfare OTT Awards	Dahaad	Best Supporting Actor (Drama series)	Nominated	
