= Sal Yusuf =

Indian actor

- Born: London, United Kingdom
- Occupations: Actor; Stand-up comedian
- Years active: 1995–present

Sal Yusuf is a British actor and comedian who works in Indian films.

== Career ==
Born in London to Cypriot immigrants, he moved to Bangalore, India, where he became a stand-up comedian and is also a part of the comedy group, The Improv. He was one of the first stand-up comedians in Bangalore. After appearing in several commercials, theatre productions, and playing supporting roles in several Malayalam films, Sal Yusuf made his Hindi film debut with Tiger Zinda Hai (2017) portraying one of the antagonists. He made his Kannada lead debut with French Biriyani alongside Danish Sait, who was also part of The Improv. In the film, he plays a French emigrant whose brief trip to Bangalore as representative of a pharmaceutical company lands him in a comedy of errors.

== Selected filmography ==
Year	Film	Role	Language	Notes
2012	Ustad Hotel	Chef	Malayalam	Voice role
2013	Kili Poyi	Drug addict	Malayalam	
2014	Iyobinte Pusthakam	Harrison	Malayalam	
2017	Take Off	Tareek	Malayalam	
2017	Comrade in America	Karl Marx	Malayalam	
2017	Tiger Zinda Hai	Al Amir Bagdawi	Hindi	
2017	CandyFlip	Cokeman	English / Hindi	
2020	India vs England	John	Kannada	
2020	Trance	Foreign pastor	Malayalam	
2020	French Biriyani	Simon	Kannada	
2022	Sardar	General Yusuf (Pakistan Army)	Tamil	
2024	Ruslaan	Ozan	Hindi	

=== Web series ===
Year	Title	Role	Platform	Language
2021	Sunflower	Chairman of Sonu Singh's Company	ZEE5	Hindi
2022	Humble Politician Nograj	Dimitri	Voot	Kannada
