= Idhuvum Kadandhu Pogum =

2014 Indian film by Anil Krishnan and Srihari Prabharan

- Release poster
- Directed by: Anil Krishnan; Srihari Prabaharan
- Written by: Srihari Prabaharan
- Produced by: M. Saravanan; M. S. Guhan; Aruna Guhan; Aparna Guhan
- Starring: Shivaji Dev; Shilpa Bhatt; Ravi Raghavendra; Anusha Varma; Anjali Nair
- Cinematography: Saleem Bilal
- Edited by: Anil Krishnan
- Music by: Umashankar Kannaiyan
- Production company: AVM Productions
- Release date: 14 April 2014
- Running time: 53 minutes
- Country: India
- Language: Tamil

Idhuvum Kadandhu Pogum (transl. This Too Shall Pass) is a 2014 Indian Tamil-language drama film directed by the debutants Anil Krishnan and Srihari Prabaharan. The story and screenplay were written by the latter. The film stars Shivaji Dev, Shilpa Bhatt, Ravi Raghavendra and Anusha Varma. The film's plotline is about finding a ray of light amidst a cloud of gloom and depression.

The film was produced by the twin sisters Aruna Guhan and Aparna Guhan under AVM Productions. Filmed by Saleem Bilal and edited by Anil Krishnan, the film features music by Umashankar and lyrics written by Manivannan and Sathyaseelan Rajendran. It is touted to be the first Indian studio-backed film to be made exclusively for the Internet. Made as a direct-to-stream video, the film was released in YouTube on 14 April 2014, which marks the New Year in Tamil calendar and the birthday of Dr. B. R. Ambedkar.

== Plot ==
The film starts off on a tragic note and travels back and forth to then and now. Gautam, a young man in his late twenties, and his fiancée in the U.S., Ramya, exchange endearments at midnight little aware of the disaster that is to strike in a few hours. The next morning, he finds out that she has met with an accident and succumbed to her injuries. It isn’t easy for Gautam to come out of the trauma that hits him hard.

== Cast ==
- Shivaji Dev as Gautam
- Ravi Raghavendra as Kumar, Gautam's father
- Shilpa Bhatt as Ramya
- Anusha Varma as Divya
- Berkin Johns as Mani, Gautam's brother
- Anjali Nair as Deepika
- Ashok Pandian as Ramya's father
- Anu Chandrasekaran as the gynecologist

== Production ==
Established by A. V. Meiyappan in 1945, AVM Productions is one of the oldest surviving film studios in Asia. Twins Aruna Guhan and Aparna Guhan, the great granddaughters of Meiyappan and the fourth generation scions of AVM Productions (their production house), were interested in film production. For their first production venture, they went through several scripts for more than six months but were not satisfied with them. When they saw Kasappu Inippu (Bitter Sweet), a ten-minute short film on YouTube, they were impressed. The short was directed by Srihari Prabaharan, a software engineer working for Wipro. The sisters invited him to narrate a script which they eventually liked. They settled for the story line as they felt it was simple, yet strong and poignant. Thus, they zeroed in on the debutant directors Srihari and his friend Anil Krishnan.

"It is a subject young people can relate to. It’s in the kind of situation where you feel you have lost something or you feel low. It gives you a message. It teaches you to move on in life."

— Aparna about the film's theme.

A "feel-good movie", the film deals with the "vicissitudes of emotions involving love". Aruna revealed in an interview that it was a story about finding hope. The film was hence titled Idhuvum Kadandhu Pogum which roughly translates to Even This Will Pass. The film, which has a runtime of about 55 minutes, was meant to last between 45 minutes and an hour as the directors felt that anything longer will make it drag. Shying away from stretching the film any longer, Aparna disclosed, "[...] If you drag it a little more, if you try to make it two-and-a-half hours or three hours, you will lose the essence of the story."

Apart from the twins, the credits for production is shared by M. Saravanan and M. S. Guhan, their grand father and father respectively. It is the 177th film to be produced by AVM. Realizing that they have fans across the world, they planned to create content for the online platform as they felt Internet was a strong medium to connect with fans. The film exclusively targets the Internet audience and marks AVM's foray into the digital domain with "net flicks". It is the first studio-backed short film made exclusively for the Internet. Speaking of the motive behind releasing the film on the internet, Aruna felt that internet was a medium which needs to be harnessed properly and expressed hope that this would go a long way in achieving it. She was quoted saying, "This may be an experimental effort, but we perceive the internet as a medium of the future."

The entire cast and crew are made up of youngsters and newcomers. Shivaji Dev, grandson of late yesteryear actor Sivaji Ganesan, was chosen to play the protagonist. The film also features Ravi Raghavendra and Shilpa Bhatt in key roles. AVM tweeted through their official Twitter handle that Shivaji Dev was not allowed to sleep for more than 30 hours to get dark circles for his role. Beside producing, Aruna worked on the film's title design and was also the costume designer for the film. Filming commenced and though it was expected to be wrapped up in five days, the shoot lasted 12 days. Although essentially a short feature film, the producers decided to go the whole hog, as they would have for a full-length movie, and did colour correction, EFX and Qube. After four months of production, the film was officially announced in November 2013. The film was made on a shoe-string budget. It was initially estimated to cost about ₹ 10 lakhs. Following the completion of the film, an audit was conducted to estimate expenses and was found to be around ₹ 20 lakhs, as informed by sources close to AVM.

== Release ==
On 22 November 2013, the film was screened in AVM Studios in the presence of M. Saravanan, M. S. Guhan and veteran director S. P. Muthuraman. The producers announced they were targeting YouTube, Amazon, Netflix and other online portals to release the film. The film was released in YouTube on 14 April 2014 coinciding with the Tamil New Year's day. Though initially available for view only in India, the film was slated to be made available for the overseas market after a month.

The producers revealed that while viewing online, the film will have two or three one-minute ads in between. The ads were sold through an auction. However, the video was found to have around seven ads with 15–30 seconds duration each. While the film was first released on the internet, it will also be marketed for television. The production house will tie-up with satellite TV channels in a bid to recover the production cost.

== Reception ==
In her review, Malathi Rangarajan of The Hindu wrote that with a story that has substance, a natural treatment and decent performances of the cast, the film should do well. She praised Dev for his performance stating he had shown he can pull both subdued and vociferous emotions with élan. She also added that Ravi Raghavendar gave a standout performance with his "excellent underplay". While hailing the spontaneity of the characters in their display of emotion, she was critical of the narrative and felt that a lag set in halfway through. Writing for The Hindu, Udhav Naig called the film "an optimistic tale of finding love again". Lauding that Shivaji Dev had delivered a dignified performance without melodrama, he also noted that the directors had demonstrated a good understanding of short film grammar by keeping the scenes tight. He also felt that the film has been made without a compromise, and has a heart of its own.

== Accolades ==
S. P. Muthuraman, who found the film heart-warming, remarked that the performances of the cast were on par with those of experienced actors. Acclaiming Saleem Bilal for his "beautiful" cinematography, he also said that the music was a strong point as it suited the mood throughout the film. In a hand-written letter of appreciation, actor Rajinikanth wrote that the film had traces of Balu Mahendra and Mani Ratnam. The film was officially selected for screening at the Madrid International Film Festival 2014 apart from receiving nominations in Best Cinematography (Saleem Bilal) and Best Costume (Aruna Guhan) categories.
