= Humble Politiciann Nograj (TV series) =

Indian drama television series

- Official Release Poster
- Genre: Comedy; Political drama
- Created by: Danish Sait
- Written by: Saad Khan; Danish Sait
- Screenplay by: Saad Khan
- Directed by: Saad Khan
- Starring: Danish Sait
- Music by: Nakul Abhyankar; Sricharan Pakala
- Composer: Nakul Abhyankar
- Country of origin: India
- Original language: Kannada
- No. of seasons: 1
- No. of episodes: 10

Production
- Executive producers: Ranjib Mazumder; Prasoon Garg
- Producers: Sameer Nair; Maaz Khan; Danish Sait; Saad Khan
- Production locations: Mysore, Karnataka
- Cinematography: Arkodeb Mukherjee
- Editor: Bharath MC
- Running time: 30 minutes
- Production companies: Applause Entertainment; Danish Sait & Firstaction Studios

Original release
- Network: Voot Select
- Release: 6 January – 6 January 2022

Related
- Humble Politician Nograj

Humble Politician Nograj is a 2022 Indian Kannada-language political satire comedy series created and produced by Danish Sait and Saad Khan that premiered on Voot. It is a sequel to the 2018 film Humble Politiciann Nograj. Danish Sait reprises the role of Nograj, a narcissistic politician who aspires to become Chief minister and make money through corruption. The series is a joint venture of Applause Entertainment, Danish Sait and Firstaction Studios. The first season was inspired by true events.

== Synopsis ==
After becoming an MLA, Nograj made a lot of money through corruption and became the state president of One Big Party (OBP) and his goal is to become the Chief Minister of Karnataka. In the General Assembly Election, no party got majority seats to form government. One Big Party has won 36 seats. Krishna Gundu Bala (KGB) State president of Most Secular Party (MSP) is three seats short of getting the majority. Nograj decides to form a coalition government by joining hands with Family Run Party, which is headed by a clueless son and his firangi mom. Horse-trading of MLAs happen, so does resort politics. Who will become the Chief Minister of Karnataka when some mafia enters in play?

== Cast ==
- Danish Sait as Humble Politiciann Nograj, state president of One Big Party("OBP") who aspires to become CM
- Prakash Belawadi as Krishna Gundu "KGB" Bala, state president of Most Secular Party("MSP")
- Vijay Chendoor as Monjunath, Nograj's personal assistant
- Disha Madan as Simi Naveen, Paid News TV reports and anchor
- Sal Yusuf as Dimitri, Russian mafia
- Shalini Narayan as Gowri, KGB wife
- Raghu Ramankoppa as Gurudas Bhat, the secretary of OBP
- Shiv Manju as Nanjundaiah, MLA of OBP and friend of Nograj
- Mohammed Ashraf as Azam Khan, a Muslim MLA from OBP and Nograj's friend
- Varun Thakur as Karan Kapoor, National president of Family Run Party("FRP")
- Geetanjali Kulkarni as Mrs. Dalal, National secretary of MSP
- Anantha Velu as Governor Govardhan
- Tiku Talsania as PM Sahab
- Shivakumar Aradhya as Pushpesh, state President of FRP
- Sathish Chandra as MLA Shashidhar
- Mahantesh Hiremath as MLA Manjay
- Andrea Ravera as Vladimir, brother of Dimitri
- Srivatsa as Ram Rehman, KGB son

== Episodes ==
No. overall	No. in season	Title	Directed by	Written by	Original release date
1	1	"Namaskara Dear Friends"	Saad Khan	Saad Khan, Danish Sait	6 January 2022
2	2	"The Resort Politics"	Saad Khan	Saad Khan, Danish Sait	6 January 2022
3	3	"Big Saar House"	Saad Khan	Saad Khan, Danish Sait	6 January 2022
4	4	"Horse Trading"	Saad Khan	Saad Khan, Danish Sait	6 January 2022
5	5	"Nograj vs KGB"	Saad Khan	Saad Khan, Danish Sait	6 January 2022
6	6	"Authority without Majority"	Saad Khan	Saad Khan, Danish Sait	6 January 2022
7	7	"Hello from the left side"	Saad Khan	Saad Khan, Danish Sait	6 January 2022
8	8	"Eyes Spies"	Saad Khan	Saad Khan, Danish Sait	6 January 2022
9	9	"Operation MSD"	Saad Khan	Saad Khan, Danish Sait	6 January 2022
10	10	"From Russia With Love"	Saad Khan	Saad Khan, Danish Sait	6 January 2022

== Productions ==
Initially Nogaraj was a character created by Danish Sait for his radio program and it gain popularity among the city folks. He decided to make a full-length feature film with his friend Saad Khan. After the success of the film Humble Politiciann Nograj, Danish Sait gained interest in making a web-series with the same name. Sameer Nair of Applause Entertainment financed this venture.

Saad Khan wanted a spin-off film and web series based on Nograj film character. Script writing started in July 2019 with Danish and team, after progressing the script decided to make web series due to length of the story and writing.

Shooting began 10 January 2020 onwards and Saad Khan directed the all 10 episodes. Most of the shooting was done in the outskirts of Mysuru. Shooting stopped for some time due to the COVID-19 pandemic.

== Music ==
=== Track list ===
No.	Title	Lyrics	Music	Singer(s)	Length
1.	"Opening Credits"		Nakul Abhyankar	Danish Sait	1:00
2.	"Scam Raja"	Danish Sait, Aditya Parashar	Sricharan Pakala	Anurag Kulkarni, Aditya Parashar, Yamini, Ambika	3:14

== Release ==
The teaser of the series was released on 17 December 2021. The ten episode first season premiered on 6 January 2022 on Voot.

== Reception ==
Critics praised the satirical slapstick comedy, dialogue, characterisation and acting but criticized the length of the episodes.

India Today wrote "Saad Khan and Danish Sait, who penned the story, made fun of every topic. From homophobia to body shaming to racism, you'll find a joke on everything. The series does not shy away from showing how the politicians exploit the system and the audience. More importantly, it cleverly takes a jibe at current politicians without using their names. No points for guessing who’s who".

== Awards and nominations ==
Award	Category	Recipient	Result	Ref
Indian Telly Streaming Awards 2022	Best Actor in Regional Series	Danish Sait	Won	
SCREENXX Awards 2022	Best Actor in Comic Role in Regional Series	Danish Sait	Won	
Digital Reinvent's Awards 2022	Best Digital Brand Campaign of the Year	Humble Politician Nograj	Won	
2022 Filmfare OTT Awards	Best Comedy Series	Applause Entertainment; Danish Sait & Firstaction Studios	Nominated	
2022 Filmfare OTT Awards	Best Actor in Comedy Series	Danish Sait	Nominated	
