= French Biriyani =

Kannada-language comedy-drama film

- Official release poster
- Directed by: Pannaga Bharana
- Written by: Pannaga Bharana; Avinash Balekkala
- Story by: Pannaga Bharana
- Produced by: Ashwini Puneeth Rajkumar; Gurudath A. Talwar
- Starring: Danish Sait; Sal Yusuf
- Cinematography: Karthik Palani
- Edited by: Deepu S. Kumar
- Music by: Vasuki Vaibhav
- Production company: PRK Productions
- Distributed by: Amazon Prime Video
- Release date: 24 July 2020
- Running time: 116 minutes
- Country: India
- Language: Kannada

French Biriyani is a 2020 Indian Kannada-language comedy drama film directed by Pannaga Bharana starring Danish Sait and Sal Yusuf. The film is produced by Ashwini Puneeth Rajkumar and Gurudath A. Talwar of PRK Productions. It was released on 24 July 2020 on Amazon Prime Video.

== Plot ==
Don Charles aka Powder Charles, a crime boss and drug kingpin, is on his deathbed. He receives a call from someone who says- "Solomon is landing with the thing." After that, Charles summons his good-for-nothing son Mani, to whom Charles strictly instructs- "Tell Suleiman that Solomon will bring the thing in the evening." To ensure that he doesn't forget, Mani repeats the statement to himself again and again. Then he gets distracted by a tele-marketing call, which leads him to forget what his father told him. He goes back to get the instruction again. But by then, Charles has already passed away.

During Charles' mourning, Suleiman, the driver is given instructions. But Mani fails to recall the proper instruction. It leaves Suleiman no choice but to go to the airport and ask everyone if they have the "Samaan" (transl; thing). As he does so, a French man named Simon thinks that Suleiman has mispronounced his name, and goes along with him thinking that Suleiman is his assigned taxi driver. Simon knows very minimal English, which leads to a lot of misunderstandings.

Then a protest led by the taxi drivers association interrupts the journey. Suleiman is dragged out of the car by protesters for against the association rules, which leads to Suleiman telling Simon to hand over the suitcase to him and leave. Simon, confused, then grabs the suitcase from him and starts asking for help. A reporter, Malini, and cameraman, Kannappa who were covering the protest try to interview Simon asking for his thoughts, but Simon keeps asking for a way to go to his hotel. Due to the language barrier there is no proper conversation between them. Then comes in Asghar, an auto driver who has a crush on Malini. She then tells Simon to take Asghar's help in order to find his hotel.

As Asghar and Simon are on their way to the hotel, his auto collides with a car which damages the auto. The driver of the car and Asghar have a fight, and attract a huge crowd. But as they were fighting, a bus drove by and one of its passengers spat gutkha out of the window, which landed on Simon.

Meanwhile, Mani and his gang capture Suleiman, who is interrogated by Mani. After Suleiman fails to give a proper answer, he is subject to chalkboard torture.

Next it is shown that Asghar has taken his auto to a mechanic, and Simon has freshened up. He needs a charger for his phone, and gives his phone to a boy who gives it to a fruit seller who has a charger. The charger is on a bunch of bananas, and the boy connects the charger to the phone and leaves the phone there itself. Then Asghar asks Simon to pay for the auto damages, and as they are fighting, a man steals the suitcase that was kept on the backseat of the auto and flees. After a chase, Simon fails to nab the thief. After that, Simon asks for his phone, and he goes to the fruit seller for it. There, a cow is eating the bunch of bananas, and he realizes that the cow has inadvertently eaten the phone too. He then holds Asghar's collar and again picks a fight with him, accusing him of stealing the phone, during which he spots a policeman and tries to report Asghar to him. Asghar, Simon, the mechanic, the cow, and a few others are brought down to the police station. Simon tries to narrate his problem to the inspector, who asks what was in the bag. He then explains in his broken English that he works for a Pharmaceutical company, but he uses the word "drug" which makes the officers think that he was part of a drug cartel that has been transporting drugs from Russia to Bangalore. The police then disregard it and let him go.

Then comes the day of Charles' funeral. As it is a public funeral, his mortal remains were being carried in the streets by a few men. Asghar and Simon go to see the funeral, and realize that one of the men carrying Charles' remains was the thief who stole Simon's bag from the auto. It then leads to Charles' body falling down as a result of Asghar's chaotic way of trying to nab the thief.

Then the story briefly shifts focus to Rahila, Asghar's sister who eloped with Purshottam, as they were part of an intercaste marriage. Due to this, Rahila's mother in law always torments her for not having a child yet. The couple go to a fertility clinic. The doctor says that Purshottam's sperm count is low, which is the reason for their inability to have a child together. Rahila then returns home, and shows Asghar a divorce notice sent by Purshottam on behalf of his mother.

Later, Mani summons Asghar and asks him about Simon. Mani then tells Asghar that Purushottam is planning to flee to Dubai. Then, a servant exposes the fact that Asghar only made Charles' body fall down, and it leads to Mani's gang chasing Asghar who fled as soon as he could.

== Cast ==
- Danish Sait as Azgar, an auto driver from Shivajinagar
- Sal Yusuf as Simon, a French expatriate who is referred to as "samaan" (transl. thing)
- Disha Madan as Malini, a news reporter
- Rangayana Raghu as Mahadev, a police officer
- Michael Madhu as Powder Charles, a don
- Mahantesh Hiremath as Muscle Mani, a Tamil gangster and Charles's son
- Pitobash Tripathy as Suleiman, Charles's driver
- Sampath Kumar as Mohananna
- Sindhu Srinivasamurthy as Rahila, Asgar's sister
- Nagabhushana as Purushottam, Rahila's husband
- Chikkanna as Gabru
- RJ Vicky as Blacky
- Vanishree as Mahadev's wife
- Keertana as Asgar's Mother
- Pannaga Bharana in a special appearance in "Yen Madodu Swamy" song
- Aditi Sagar in a special appearance in "The Bengaluru Song"

== Production ==
The film commenced filming in January 2019 in Bangalore and finished shooting in forty days. The plot of the film is based on the journey of Pannaga Bharana when he travelled from Bangalore to Chennai. When Bharana arrived in Chennai, he was approached by several auto drivers who took him through small alleyways. The film is about a three-day trip between an auto driver from Shivaji Nagar (played by Danish Sait) and a French emigrant (played by Sal Yusuf) during the latter's visit to Bangalore. TikTok star Disha Madan made her film debut with this film and enacted the role of a news reporter.

== Soundtrack ==
French Biriyani

Soundtrack album by Vasuki Vaibhav
- Released: 2020
- Recorded: 2020
- Genre: Feature film soundtrack
- Length: 12:50
- Language: Kannada
- Label: PRK Audio
- Producer: Vasuki Vaibhav

Vasuki Vaibhav chronology
Law (2020)	French Biriyani (2020)	Badava Rascal (2021)

Singles from French Biriyani
- 1. "The Bengaluru Song" Released: 17 July 2020; 2. "Yen Maadodu Swamy" Released: 21 July 2020

The songs are composed by Vasuki Vaibhav, Pannaga Bharana's cousin. The first single from the film, "The Bengaluru Song", has lyrics by Vaibhav and Avinash Balekkala and is sung by Aditi Sagar. The next single from the film titled "Yen Madodu Swamy" sung by Puneeth Rajkumar was released on 21 July 2020.

Tracklist
No.	Title	Lyrics	Singer(s)	Length
1.	"The Bengaluru Song"	Vasuki Vaibhav, Avinash Balekkala	Aditi Sagar	3:34
2.	"Oh Fakhrudeen"	Vasuki Vaibhav, Avinash Balekkala	Madhuri Sheshadri, Karthik Chennoji Rao	2:41
3.	"Hogbitta Charles Hogbitta"	Avinash Balekkala, Vasuki Vaibhav	Vasuki Vaibhav	3:09
4.	"Yen Madodu Swamy"	Vasuki Vaibhav, Avinash Balekkala	Puneeth Rajkumar	3:26

== Release ==
The film was originally scheduled to have a theatrical release in August 2020, but due to COVID-19 pandemic that was dropped in favour of an online release. The film was released on 24 July 2020 on Amazon Prime Video.

== Reception ==
The Indian Express gave the film a rating of two-and-a-half out of five stars and wrote that "The first half of the movie is full of improv humour following the terrifying experiences of the French national. And add to that Danish's flawless Urdu mixed with urban Kannada dialect, you get plenty of funny moments over the course of two hours".

== Accolades ==
Year	Award	Category	Recipient	Result	Ref.
2021	2nd Chandanavana Film Critics Academy Awards	Best Lyrics	Vasuki Vaibhav; Avinash ("Hogbitta Charlie")	Nominated	
2021	2nd Chandanavana Film Critics Academy Awards	Best Female Singer	Aditi Sagar ("The Bengaluru")	Nominated	
2021	2nd Chandanavana Film Critics Academy Awards	Best Art Director	Shivakumar	Nominated	
2021	2nd Chandanavana Film Critics Academy Awards	Best Choreographer:	B Dhananjay ("The Bengaluru")	Nominated	
2021	10th South Indian International Movie Awards	Best Film	PRK Productions	Nominated	
2021	10th South Indian International Movie Awards	Best Director	Pannaga Bharana	Won	
2021	10th South Indian International Movie Awards	Best Cinematographer	Kharthik Palani	Nominated	
2021	10th South Indian International Movie Awards	Best Actor	Danish Sait	Nominated	
2021	10th South Indian International Movie Awards	Best Supporting Actor	Sal Yusuf	Nominated	
2021	10th South Indian International Movie Awards	Best Comedian	Rangayana Raghu	Won	
2021	10th South Indian International Movie Awards	Best Lyricist	Raghavendra V. Kamath	Nominated	
2021	10th South Indian International Movie Awards	Best Female Playback Singer	Aditi Sagar	Won	
