= Swayam Krushi (2011 film) =

2011 film by Veerendra Babu

- Directed by: Veerendra Babu
- Written by: Veerendra Babu; K M Indra
- Produced by: Veerendra Babu
- Starring: Veerendra Babu; Tamanna Pasha
- Cinematography: S. R. Sudhakar; Cinetech Suri
- Music by: Abhimanyu Roy
- Production company: Swayam Krushi
- Release date: 1 September 2011
- Running time: 135 minutes
- Country: India
- Language: Kannada

Swayam Krushi is a 2011 Indian Kannada-language romantic drama film directed by debutante, Veerendra Babu, who also produced, wrote the screenplay, and acted in the film alongside newcomer Tamanna Pasha. The film did not perform well at the box office.

== Cast ==
- Veerendra Babu as Vijaykumar
- Tamanna Pasha as Kalyani
- Bianca Desai as Priya
- Ambareesh as a chief minister
- Suman as GK, a contractor
- Charan Raj as Prakash Bhandari, Kalyani's father
- Rekha V. Kumar as Kalyani's mother
- Vijay Chendoor
- Janardhan as Amogh
- Satyajith
- Chidanand
- Umashree
- Rangayana Raghu
- Mumaith Khan in an item number

== Reception ==
A critic from The Times of India gave the film a rating of three out of five stars and wrote that "Though N Veerendrababu has selected a drab subject, a number of sequences keep you glued to the movie". In a review by Deccan Herald, the reviewer stated that "Director Veerendra Babu has shown people it is alright to apply the words of Mahatma Gandhi, Swami Vivekananda and others, to achieve success and create a modern Ram Rajya (transl. Rama's kingdom)". A critic from Bangalore Mirror wrote that "Swayam Krushi's only credit is that it does not descend into the lowest ebb". A critic from Indo-Asian News Service wrote that "Babu's direction clearly shows his inexperience in filmmaking, but the real dampner is his performance as protagonist".
