= Thaka Dhimi Tha Dancing Star =

- Anybody can dance!
- Also known as: MTS Takdhimita Dancing Star
- Genre: Dance
- Based on: Jhalak Dikhhla Jaa
- Developed by: BBC Worldwide
- Presented by: Akul Balaji
- Judges: Guruprasad; Rakshita; Yogesh
- Country of origin: India
- Original language: Kannada
- No. of seasons: 1
- No. of episodes: 34

Production
- Production location: Bengaluru
- Camera setup: Multi-camera
- Production company: Viacom 18

Original release
- Network: ETV Kannada
- Release: 11 January – 4 May 2014

Related
- Jhalak Dikhhla Jaa; Strictly Come Dancing; Dancing with the Stars

Thaka Dhimi Tha Dancing Star (ತಕಧಿಮಿತ ಡಾನ್ಸಿಂಗ್ ಸ್ಟಾರ್) is a Kannada dance reality show broadcast by ETV Kannada in 2014. It is an adaptation of Colors TV's Jhalak Dikhhla Jaa. The show format is owned by BBC Worldwide. It features celebrities as contestants who are paired with professional dancers competing for a cash prize of ₹15 Lakhs. The judges are Guruprasad, Rakshita, and Yogesh. Akul Balaji is the host. The show premiered on 11 January 2014.

Grand finale was held at Innovative Film City and was broadcast on 4 May 2014. Tsunami Kitty and Disha Madan won the Dancing Star title for season one. The show was produced by Pixel Pictures Private Limited.

== Contestants ==
A total of 12 celebrities, mostly TV actors, are coupled with dancing partners for the show.

Six out of twelve celebrities are associated with the broadcast channel in various programs. Apart from Rishi Kumara and Kumudha, all the celebrities do not have any prior experience in dancing.

| # | Celebrity | Claim to fame | Professional partner |
|---|---|---|---|
| 1 | Jayalakshmi | Bigg Boss Kannada contestant | Danny Jackson; Bengaluru |
| 2 | Chandan | TV actor Lakshmi Baramma | Meghna Kamath; Tulu Nadu |
| 3 | Saniya Iyer | TV actress Puttagowri Maduve | Dhanush; Mandya |
| 4 | Dodda Ganesh | Cricketer; Bowler | Shruthi; Karavali |
| 5 | Kumudha | Model | Suman Shetty; Shimoga |
| 6 | Rishi Kumara | Bigg Boss Kannada contestant | Tanusha; Mysore |
| 7 | Shamitha Malnad | Singer | Ratheesh; Mangalore |
| 8 | Sihi Kahi Chandru | Actor; Comedian | Payal Gupta; Bengaluru |
| 9 | Navya | TV Anchor; Star Saviruchi | Manjunath; Nelamangala |
| 10 | Thriller Manju | Stunt Master | Shilpa; Bengaluru |
| 11 | Anupama Bhat | TV Anchor; Kitchen Taare | Yashwanth; Hubli |
| 12 | Tsunami Kitty | Reality Show Alumni; Indian | Disha Madan; Bengaluru |

== Weekly summary ==
| Week No. | Episode No. | Original Air Date | Couple Evicted Rank | Theme | Best Jodi Of The Week |
|---|---|---|---|---|---|
| 1 Grand Premiere | 1; 2 | 11 January 2014; 12 January 2014 | —N/a | Introduction | —N/a |
| 1 Grand Premiere | Celebrity contestants were introduced with individual performance and were paired with professional dancers for the competition. | | | | |
| 2 | 3; 4 | 18 January 2014; 19 January 2014 | —N/a | Freestyle Chemistry | Navya & Manjunath |
| 2 | The duet theme did induce some chemistry between the couples. | | | | |
| 3 | 5; 6 | 25 January 2014; 26 January 2014 | Ganesh & Shruthi; Rank 12 | Tapanguchi (Suntaragali) | Kitty & Disha |
| 3 | Multiple song bits and remix tracks were used to facilitate the local dance form. | | | | |
| 4 | 7; 8 | 1 February 2014; 2 February 2014 | Manju & Shilpa; Rank 11 | Comedy | Shamitha & Ratheesh |
| 4 | The show duration was reduced to 50 minutes.; The costumes and props were well suited for the comic theme. | | | | |
| 5 | 9; 10 | 8 February 2014; 9 February 2014 | Chandru & Payala - | Filmy Folk Group | Kitty & Disha |
| 5 | The folk group dances were colorful and enjoyable. | | | | |
| 6 | 11; 12 | 15 February 2014; 16 February 2014 | Kumudha & Suman - | Bollywood Romance | Anupama & Yashwanth |
| 6 | Crazy Star Ravichandran was invited as a guest for the Valentine week.; All contestants performed for romantic songs from the Bollywood. | | | | |
| 7 | 13; 14 | 22 February 2014; 23 February 2014 | Jayalakshmi & Danny; Rank 10 | Spontaneous Talent | Rishi & Tanusha |
| 7 | Kumudha & Suman and Chandru & Payal re-entered the show as wildcard entries after competing with other evicted contestants.; Spontaneous talent round – The contestants had to perform for a randomly played music without any prior practice (100 seconds).; Rishi Kumara & Tanusha won a cash prize of ₹ 1 Lakh for best performance. | | | | |
| 8 | 15; 16 | 1 March 2014; 2 March 2014 | —N/a | Retro, The 60s,70s, & 80s | Chandru & Payal |
| 8 | Contestants performed for retro songs with suitable costumes of that era. | | | | |
| 9 | 17; 18 | 8 March 2014; 9 March 2014 | Navya & Manjunath; Rank 9 | Family (dancing with family/friends) | Shamitha |
| 9 | This week's 2-hour episodes were dedicated to the families of contestants, judges, and the host who were invited on stage.; Movie director Prem was invited as a guest for the week.; The celebrities danced with their family members or friends. Their dancing partners were rested for the week. | | | | |
| 10 | 19; 20 | 15 March 2014; 16 March 2014 | —N/a | Ulta pulta (Cross-dressing) | Saniya & Yashwanth |
| 10 | Show duration: 1 hour 15 minutes; Dance partners of the celebrities were swapped randomly.; Contestants had to cross-dress for the week's performance. | | | | |
| 11 | 21; 22 | 22 March 2014; 23 March 2014 | Chandru & Payal; Rank 8 | International Dance | Kitty & Disha |
| 11 | International dance formats like Hip-Hop, Afro, Salsa, Robotic, Contemporary, and Pasodoble were performed. | | | | |
| 12 | 23; 24 | 30 March 2014; 31 March 2014 | Kumudha & Suman; Rank 7 | Mythology & Modern Music | Shamitha & Ratheesh |
| 12 | Contestants enacted mythological characters with supporting group for modern music.; The theme was well executed and the performances were entertaining.; Evicted couple Rishi & Tanusha stepped in to replace Kumudha & Suman who withdrew from Dancing Star. | | | | |
| 13; Quarter Finals | 25; 26 | 5 April 2014; 6 April 2014 | —N/a | Legend Kannada Actor Dr. Rajkumar & Family Special | Saniya & Dhanush |
| 13; Quarter Finals | Contestants performed for hit songs of Dr. Rajkumar, Shivrajkumar, Raghavendra Rajkumar, and Puneeth Rajkumar. | | | | |
| 14; Quarter Finals | 27; 28 | 12 April 2014; 13 April 2014 | Chandan & Meghna; Rank 6 | Dance on Wheels | Shamitha & Ratheesh |
| 14; Quarter Finals | Contestants utilized automobiles (scooter, auto rickshaw) and furniture fixed with wheels (bed, school bench, stand) for the theme "dance on wheels."; Chandan did not turn up for the show implying that he withdrew from Dancing Star. | | | | |
| 15; Semi Finals | 29; 30 | 19 April 2014; 20 April 2014 | Rishi & Tanusha; Rank 5 | Brahmastra (Metaphor: Best of Dance Talent) | —N/a |
| 15; Semi Finals | Each couple had to perform twice to compete in the semi-finals.; No points were awarded for performances.; Performances were judged by the number of SMS votes sent by the viewers. | | | | |
| 16; Making Of Dancing Star | 31; 32 | 26 April 2014; 27 April 2014 | —N/a | —N/a; Making Of Dancing Star | —N/a |
| 16; Making Of Dancing Star | No performances were held.; Episode 31: Judges and host shared their experience about the Dancing Star show. Episode 32: Four finalists shared their success story in the Dancing Star show. | | | | |
| 17; Grand Finale | 33; 34 | 3 May 2014; 4 May 2014 | Shamitha & Ratheesh; Rank 4 | Freestyle | —N/a |
| 17; Grand Finale | Episode 33 (Grand Finale Curtain Raiser): Episode focused on four finalists in preparation for the finale. Episode 34 (Grand Finale): Crazy Star Ravichandran was invited as a guest judge for the finale.; Round 1: An eliminator round in which the finalists performed for hit songs of Crazy Star Ravichandran. Based on viewers' SMS votes and judges' scores, Shamitha & Ratheesh were eliminated. Round 2: A devotional-themed round in which Kitty and Disha won the Dancing Star title surpassing Anupama & Saniya. Cash Prize: Kitty received ₹10 Lakhs. Disha and choreographer received ₹5 Lakhs.: Couple / Result; Kitty & Disha / Rank 1; Anupama & Yashwanth / Rank 2; Saniya & Dhanush / Rank 3 | | | | |

== Weekly scores ==
The maximum points awarded for a couple is 30.

Danger Zone: Irrespective of scores, couples can be subject to eviction based on the SMS votes.

Week 1: The premiere week had no competition or scores.
Week 7: No points or scores were awarded for performances.
Week 9: No elimination.
Week 11: Rishi & Tanusha were elimination, but re-entered again.
Week 12: No elimination.
Week 13: Quarter Finals and no elimination.
Week 14: Quarter Finals.
Week 15: Semi Finals.
Week 16: No performance.
Week 17: Finals.

Grand Finale: The performance of finalists were judged in two round with an additional guest judge (40 points)

| Dancing Star | | | Scoreboard | | | | | | | | | | | Quarter Finals | | Semi Finals | Finals | |
| Rank | Couple | ←Total → | Week 2 | Week 3 | Week 4 | Week 5 | Week 6 | Week 7 | Week 8 | Week 9 | Week 10 | Week 11 | Week 12 | Week 13 | Week 14 | Week 15 | Round 1 | Round 2 |
| 1 | Kitty & Disha | 395.5 | 27.5 | 30 | 21 | 30 | 30 | NP | 27 | 30 | 21 | 30 | 26 | 29.5 | 27 | NP | 29 | 37.5 |
| 2 | Anupama & Yashwanth | 380.5 | 24.5 | 26 | 28 | 25 | 30 | NP | 27 | 27 | 20 | 30 | 26 | 24 | 26.5 | NP | 36 | 30.5 |
| 3 | Saniya & Dhanush | 385.5 | 24.5 | 22.5 | 30 | 27 | 27 | NP | 24 | 27 | 30 | 22 | 28 | 30 | 24.5 | NP | 32 | 37 |
| 4 | Shamitha & Ratheesh | 374 | 28.5 | 30 | 30 | 27 | 30 | NP | 21 | 30 | 30 | 27.5 | 30 | 24.5 | 30 | NP | 35.5 | |
| 5 | Rishi & Tanusha | 305 | 21.5 | 28 | 30 | 25 | 20 | NP | 27 | 30 | 20 | 20 | 30 | 26.5 | 27 | | | |
| 6 | Chandan & Meghna | 274.5 | 25.5 | 27 | 30 | 20 | 25 | NP | 22 | 30 | 27 | 23 | 27 | 18 | DNP | | | |
| 7 | Kumudha & Suman | 231.5 | 26.5 | 29 | 29 | 22 | | NP | 27 | 29 | 24 | 24 | 21 | | | | | |
| 8 | Chandru & Payal | 149.5 | 24.5 | 27 | 21 | | | NP | 26 | 27 | 24 | | | | | | | |
| 9 | Navya & Manjunath | 135 | 30 | 20 | 22 | 24 | 19 | NP | 20 | | | | | | | | | |
| 10 | Jayalakshmi & Danny | 111.5 | 24 | 24 | 21.5 | 26 | 16 | | | | | | | | | | | |
| 11 | Manju & Shilpa | 43 | 23 | 20 | | | | | | | | | | | | | | |
| 12 | Ganesh & Shruthi | 21 | 21 | | | | | | | | | | | | | | | |

indicates the couple in danger zone who faced eviction.
indicates that the couple withdrew.
NP indicates no points.
DNP indicates did not perform.

== Alternate names ==
MTS Dancing Star
MTS Takadhimitha
Takdhimita
Thaka Dhimi Tha
Dancing Star
Taka Dimi Ta
