= Saad Khan =

Indian film director

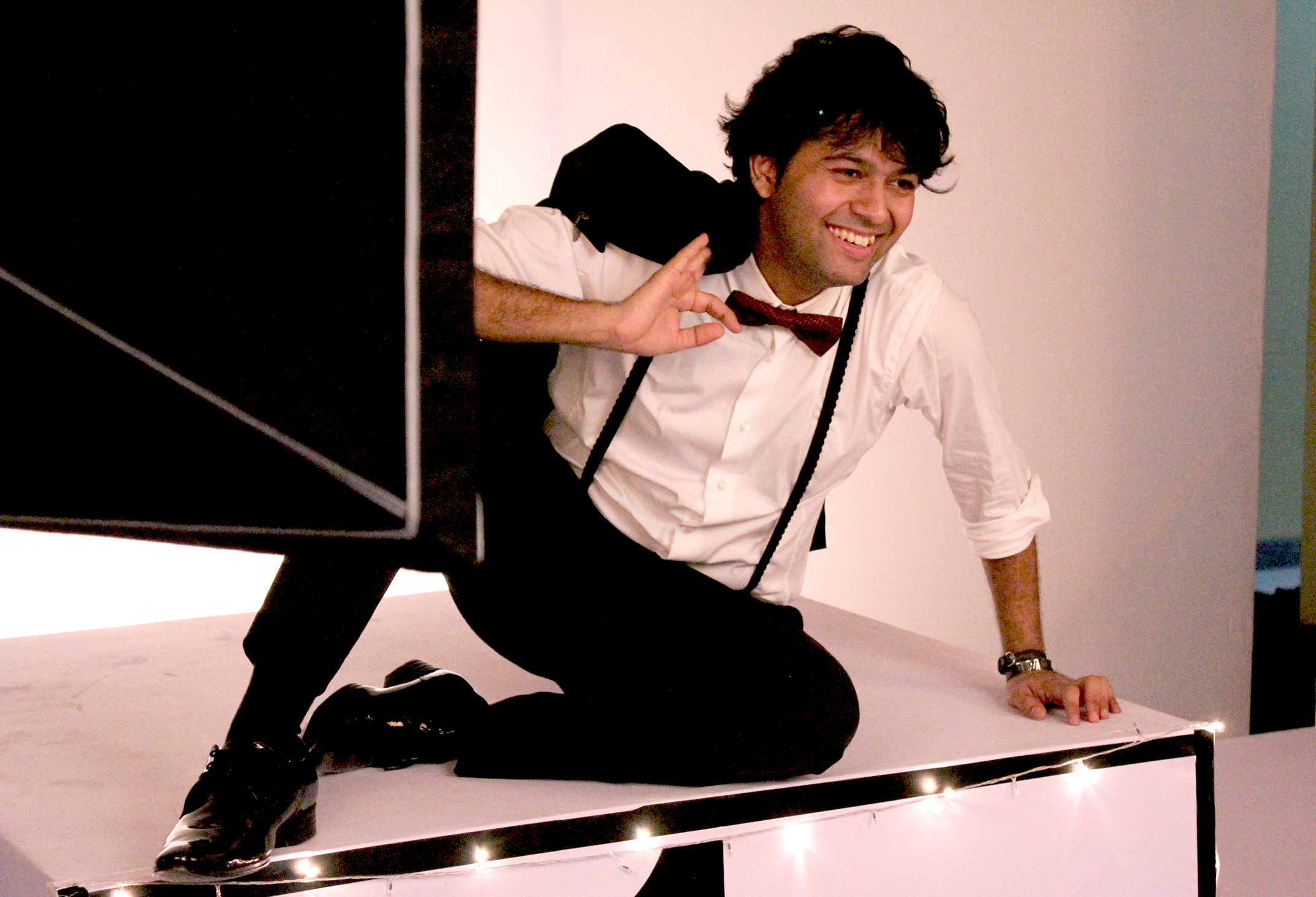
- Born: Mumbai, India
- Education: Master of Arts in Media and Communication, Bachelor's degree in Mechanical Engineering
- Alma mater: University of Louisiana at Lafayette, New York University Tisch School of the Arts, Ramaiah Institute of Technology
- Occupations: Filmmaker; entrepreneur
- Years active: 2008–present
- Known for: Humble Politician Nograj (2018); Ankahi Ansuni (2021); Humble Politician Nograj (2022); Constable Girpade (2023)
- Awards: South Indian International Movie Awards

Saad Khan is an Indian director, screenwriter and acting teacher and improv comedian who works in films and web series. He is the founder and creative head of FirstAction Studios, which merged with Mumbai-based media conglomerate Rainshine Entertainment. He is known for his Kannada-English feature film Humble Politician Nograj (2018), which was the first Kannada film to achieve world-wide digital audience presence on Amazon's PrimeVideo platform.

As a writer and director, Khan's short film Another Kind of Black (2008) was screened at the Cannes Film Festival. During the first COVID lockdown, he created a Hindi web series and was also the chief writer for Ankahi Ansuni, a horror-thriller which is streaming on Disney+ Hotstar.

In addition to his directorial ventures, Station, Love & She, an indie Hollywood feature film on Amazon, and Humble Politician Nograj, he is the host and creator of the live improvisational comedy show The Improv, which became a platform for many stand-up and improv comedians in the country.

Khan created, wrote and directed the web series Constable Girpade, which was released on Amazon Mini TV on October 6, 2023. The series stars Vrajesh Hirjee, Gaurav Gera, and Muskan Bamne, and is a cop-comedy drama revolving around constable Mandaar Girpade (Khushaal Pawaar) and constable Timothy D’Mello (Neel Salekar), both stationed in an upscale area of Mumbai.

== Early life and education ==
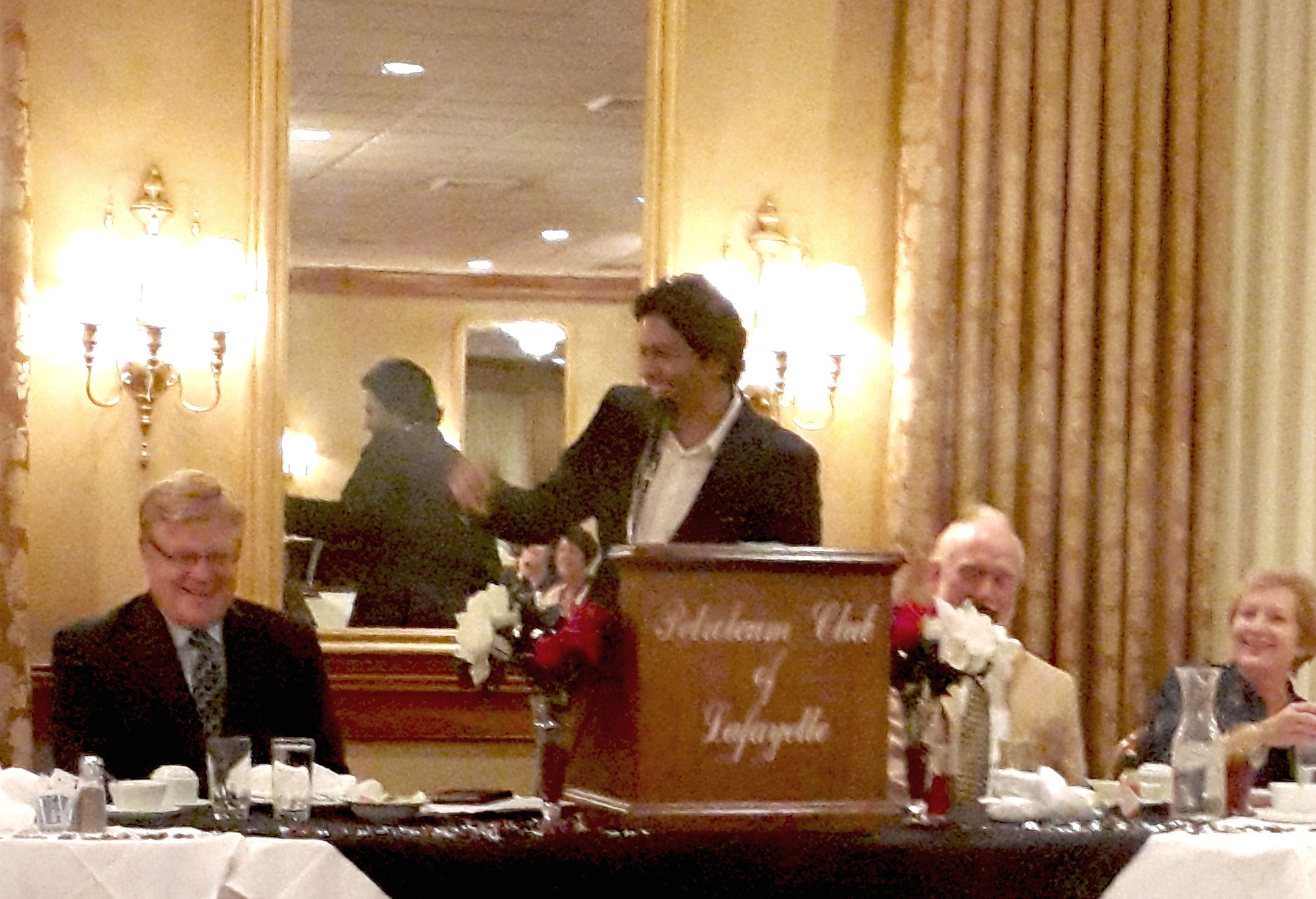
Khan giving the keynote speech after receiving the Outstanding Alumnus Award 2015 from the University of Louisianaat Lafayette

Khan was born in Mumbai, India, and was raised in Bangalore. He is an alumnus of St. Joseph's College, eventually graduating as a mechanical engineer from M.S. Ramaiah Institute of Technology. While studying to be an engineer, he developed an interest in theatre at the age of 17 and started writing and directing plays, also spearheading a theatre group which produced over 12 plays in four years.

After graduating from college, Khan left for the United States to continue his education in filmmaking. He earned a degree certificate in filmmaking from Tisch School of the Arts, New York University, where he was also awarded a study scholarship and assistantship. He then attended the University of Louisiana at Lafayette, where he was awarded his master's degree in Communication and Media. He returned to New York to complete the summer degree program in directing at Tisch.

== Career ==
Right after completing college, Khan wrote and directed two short films, Another Kind of Black and On My Mind. The former was selected at the Short Film Corner of the Cannes Film Festival, and the latter was shot in the south of the US and was screened at the Acadiana Film Festival.

On his return to India, Khan assisted Ashutosh Gowariker on the Bollywood film Khelein Hum Jee Jaan Sey.

After a two-year stint in Mumbai, he founded the media company Firstaction Studios in Bangalore. It creates content, ad films, and commercials for brands; offers acting, communication, and media workshops; produces stage shows; and manages casting for films, ads, television commercials, and viral videos.

Khan's production of the live comedy show The Improv became a popular feature for Bangalore audiences. Unscripted and unrehearsed, the show has Khan and four improv comedians perform improv comedy on the spot by taking suggestions from a live audience. The Improv was the first national act which was presented by Black Dog Easy Evenings in Hyderabad, after they toured with performers such as Russell Peters, Robert Schneider, and the team of Whose Line Is It Anyway? In addition to performing across major Indian metro cities, The Improv has toured internationally with well received shows in Dubai, Abu Dhabi, and Sweden.

Khan created something with Danish Sait that changed the face of Kannada filmmaking - Humble Politician Nograj. The movie was a satirical take on a narcissistic and crazy politician's ambition to go from a small-time corporator to an influential MLA. It also created a strong buzz by becoming the first Kannada feature film on the international OTT platform Amazon PrimeVideo. With the rising popularity of web series and online shows, Khan and team decided to make a web series. Instead of a film sequel to Humble Politician Nograj, Khan and Sait made the sequel as a web series in association with Applause Entertainment. The first season focused on Nograj's journey after he became an MLA. Khan stated that the idea to push it online was creatively focused.

The Nograj web series is written and directed by Khan in association with Danish Sait, and executed by FirstAction Studios. The primary producer is Sameer Nair, the CEO of Applause Entertainment and the content publisher of shows such as Scam, Criminal Justice, and Hostages, and Maaz Khan of FirstAction Studios. The show released on Voot in 2022 to rave reviews.

Khan's venture with Danish Sait – FirstAction, gave significant stakes to Mumbai-based Rainshine Entertainment in a strategic move.

Khan has also conducted numerous acting workshops and mentored many artists. His students include comics such as Sumukhi Suresh and Kenny Sebastian; and actors Samyukta Hornad, Ria Nalavade, Medha Rana, Fahmaan Khan, and Ayn Zoya.

Khan wrote and created the web series Ankahi Ansuni, a thriller about a sub-inspector caught in a web of myths and superstitions as he tries to solve strange crimes in a small north Indian town. It was released on 15 July 2021 on Disney+ Hotstar. Also featured on the same OTT platform is Chattis Aur Maina, a story about a dancer girl (a Nachaniya) and what happens when she falls in love with a decent man who has a heart of gold and the soul of a poet, conceptualized by Khan and Saishree D.

Khan's upcoming film Sangeet is a romantic comedy-drama, written and directed by himself, and produced by Chandru Manoharan of Lahari Music and Nikhil Kumarswamy. It will mark FirstAction's foray into full-length features and theatrical releases in the Telugu industry.

== Web series ==
=== Humble Politician Nograj ===
Khan had his debut OTT release with Humble Politician Nograj, produced by Applause Entertainment in association with FirstAction Studios. It premiered on Voot Select in January 2022. Written and directed by Khan, the series begins with a tribute to the Kannada actor Puneeth Rajkumar (Appu), who died in 2021. It is a sequel to the 2018 film Humble Politician Nograj, in which Rajkumar had played a cameo.

The first season has 10 episodes, each with a duration of 30 minutes. The show deals with a fractured mandate and the desire to hold on to power.

Subha J Rao of Firstpost stated, "The show, produced by Sameer Nair, Maaz Khan, Danish Sait and Saad Khan, is deeply irreverent, and it is refreshing to see no one being spared. We should all learn to laugh and lighten up a bit. When Nograj can, can't we?"

A critic for Cinema Express said, "Nograj is back and chutzpah is intact!"

=== Constable Girpade ===
Khan created and directed the comedy drama Constable Girpade, which premiered on Amazon Mini TV on October 6, 2023. Produced by Maaz Khan of Firstaction Studios, the series features Khushaal Pawaar, Neel Salkar, Muskan Bamne, Dr. Sanket Bhosale, Gaurav Gera, Vrajesh Hirjee and Chandni Bhabda.

The screenplay and dialogues were written by Khan, Abhinav Vaidya, and Aditya Bharadwaj. It was edited by Bharath MC, and the music was composed by Sid Paul.

The storyline follows Mandaar Ghorpade, a rookie constable nicknamed Girpade, as he follows in his late father's footsteps by joining the police force. Assigned to oversee a wealthy Mumbai neighborhood, Girpade's father, senior constable Amol Ghorpade, died life in pursuit of the notorious criminal Phenyl Mohan, a master of disguise.

Archika Khurana of The Times of India described it as a lighthearted show which offers a "suitable option for a weekend binge-watch, with ample humor and enjoyable character dynamics".

== Personal life ==
Khan has a younger brother, Maaz Khan, who is a partner and producer at FirstAction studios. His mother, Sabiha Zubair, and sister, Safa Khan, have been cited as strong influences on Khan.

== Awards and honours ==
- Young Achiever in Media by Whistling Woods International
- Award in Recognition for Excellence in Media by Symbiosis International University
- Awarded Outstanding Alumnus by the University of Louisiana at Lafayette, Department of Communication
- Karnataka Award - Department of Youth Empowerment and Sports
- Nominated for SIIMA Award for Best Debut Director (Kannada) at the 8th South Indian International Movie Awards

== Filmography ==
=== Director ===
Year	Film	Director	Writer	Producer	Notes
2008	Another Kind of Black	Yes	No	Yes	Short film
2010	On My Mind	Yes	Yes	No	Short film
2014	Station	Yes	Yes	No	Hindi film
2018	Humble Politician Nograj	Yes	Yes	No	Nominated for SIIMA Award
2020	Love and She	Yes	Yes	No	Released 2016 (United States)
2021	Chattis Aur Maina	No	Yes	No	Web series
2021	Ankahi Ansuni	No	Yes	No	TBA
2022	Humble Politiciann Nograj	Yes	Yes	Yes	Web series
2023	Constable Girpade	Yes	Yes	Yes	wWeb series
