= Brand Babu =

2018 film directed by P. Prabhakar

- Theatrical release poster
- Directed by: Prabhakar Podakandla
- Written by: Maruthi
- Produced by: Shailendra Babu
- Starring: Sumanth Shailendra; Eesha Rebba
- Cinematography: Karthik Palani
- Edited by: S. B. Uddhav
- Music by: Jeevan Babu
- Release date: 3 August 2018
- Running time: 144 minutes
- Country: India
- Language: Telugu

Brand Babu is a 2018 Indian Telugu language film directed by Prabhakar Podakandla. It stars Sumanth Shailendra and Eesha Rebba.

== Cast ==
- Sumanth Shailendra as Diamond Babu
- Eesha Rebba as Radha
- Murali Sharma as Diamond Babu's father
- Raja Ravindra as Radha's uncle
- Pujita Ponnada as Pavani
- Satyam Rajesh
- Nalini
- Venu Yeldandi as Diamond Babu's assistant
- Meesam Suresh

== Soundtrack ==
No.	Title	Singer(s)	Length
1.	"Vennelamma Venchensena"	Mohammed Hymath
2.	"Andala Blackberry"	Mohammed Hymath, Rahul Sipligunj
3.	"Brand Babu Okkadu"	Ramya Behara
4.	"Rave Rave Aliveni"	Satya Yamini, Srikrishna Vishnubotla
5.	"Inthe Prema"	Lipsika

== Reception ==
The Times of India gave 3 out of 5 stars, praised the climax of the film, and concluded, "Audiences need to watch the movie to know how the twisted love story ends and whether the brand obsessed father- son accept Radha for who she is".
