= Afsos =

2020 Indian dark comedy series

- Promotional Poster
- Created by: Anirban Dasgupta; Dibya Chaterjee
- Written by: Dibya Chatterjee; Anirban Dasgupta; Sourav Ghosh
- Directed by: Anubhuti Kashyap
- Starring: Gulshan Devaiah; Sulagna Panigrahi; Anjali Patil; Heeba Shah; Aakash Dahiya; Ratnabali Bhattacharjee
- Composer: Neel Adhikari
- Country of origin: India
- Original languages: Hindi; English
- No. of seasons: 1
- No. of episodes: 8

Production
- Cinematography: Krish Makhija
- Editor: Prerna Saigal
- Camera setup: Single-camera
- Running time: 3 and 1/2 hours.
- Production company: OML Entertainment

Original release
- Network: Amazon Prime Video
- Release: 6 February 2020

Afsos (transl. Regret) is an Indian black comedy thriller series directed by Anubhuti Kashyap. Starring Gulshan Devaiah, Sulagna Panigrahi, Anjali Patil and Heeba Shah, the series follows a depressed man who wants to commit suicide but is unable to die. Into the opening credits of the series, it is claimed to be based on Bengali novel 'Golper Goru Chaande' ('Fiction's Cow Can Go To The Moon'), penned by an author named Kalponik Bandopadhyay. It premiered on Amazon Prime Video on 6 February 2020.

== Episodes ==
The series is made up of 8 mini episodes adding to a total runtime of 204 minutes. Below is the list of episodes with summary:

=== Episode 1: The solution ===
Nakul (Gulshan Devaiah) is a struggling writer based in Mumbai, who is having a hard time coping with unemployment, lovelessness and personal guilt. This leads him on a suicidal path as he tries creative ways of ending his life. On one occasion he lies down in front of an incoming train, but is saved by a senile beggar who ends up dead instead. Nakul then jumps in a lake, but is saved by onlookers. His psychiatrist Shloka (Anjali Patil) argues that deep down he doesn't want to die, as his survival instinct always kicks in and saves him from his misadventures.

In the Harsil town of Uttarakhand a local cop, Bir Singh (Aakash Dahiya) is investigating the murder of 11 monks in a Hindu monastery. The 12th monk and the prime suspect is missing.

Meanwhile, Nakul approaches an agency "Emergency Exit" which specialises in assisted suicide and orders a hit on himself. The agent Maria Gomes (Ratnabali Bhattacharjee) assures him that his death is certain as the job will be handled by Updadhyay (Heeba Shah). Updadhyay is a ruthless killer who is very committed to her assignment. She maintains a kill count of her victims by slashing her arms with a blade.

Later in the day Nakul receives call from a publishing house expressing interest in his work. It seems luck is beginning to turn in Nakul's favour.

=== Episode 2: The calm ===
Nakul had accidentally given the wrong address of his apartment because of which Updadhyay kills a person in the neighbouring block. As Nakul relishes his last day, he settles all debts with local shopkeepers and meets up with Shloka at a tea stall.

Two days earlier, the head monk of Harshil monastery had handed over the Elixir of life (Amrut) to the 12th monk, Fokatiya. The Elixir would grant immortality if it is served by an immortal, otherwise it would act as poison. Fokatiya had to find the "immortal man" in Mumbai. The monks are not the only ones in the quest for immortality. A scientist based out of London, Dr. Goldfish (Jamie Alter) is actively conducting research on the subject.

Shloka tells Nakul that her husband had committed suicide and hence does she not want the same fate for him. She also admits her feelings for Nakul. This is motivation enough for him, as he now has someone who cares for him and hence a purpose in life. As they speak on, Nakul is shot in the head by Updadhyay. Fokatiya happens to be around the tea stall and along with Shloka and they rush him to the hospital.

=== Episode 3: The afterlife ===
Nakul has luckily survived the head shot, however the bullet is now permanently stuck on his forehead. On hearing that he had survived several suicide attempts earlier, Fokatiya is convinced that Nakul is the immortal man he is looking for. Updadhyay is dining with Maria and her daughter when a patron verbally abuses Maria's daughter for a trivial mishap. Despite Maria's insistence Updadhyay retaliates by plucking out his eyeball out with a fork.

An investigative journalist Ayesha Mirani (Sulagna Panigrahi) has authored an article about the existence of Amrut within the Harshil monastery following which the monks were killed. Her editor is critical of this and warns her not to pursue this further. She hears about the suicide agency "emergency exit" and decides to do a story on them instead. Meanwhile, Bir Singh travels to Mumbai where the 12th monk, Fokatiya, was seen.

Nakul approaches the suicide agency to cancel the hit he has ordered on himself. However Maria tells him it is impossible as Updadhyay doesn't leave any assignment incomplete. As they speak, Updadhyay arrives on the spot and tries to kill Nakul. The trio escape with the help of a Russian tourist who happened to be around.

=== Episode 4: The stranger ===
After escaping from Updadhyay, the trio along with the Russian tourist Jim (Danish Sait) arrive at Shloka's house. Fokatiya explains the legend of Elixir and tell Nakul he is the immortal man. Later in the day Fokatiya explains Nakul that the Amrut was produced by Samudra Manthan, the mythological churning of sea and since then has been preserved by the monks' order. The British East India company was looking for the same, but with the help of Maharaja of Lahore they tricked the British into thinking the Kohinoor diamond was the Elixir. However they realised the trickery after the death of Queen Victoria.

Meanwhile, Bir Singh goes around sticking wanted posters of Fokatiya branding him as murder suspect. While at a local police station, Shloka notices the wanted poster and immediately calls Nakul to warn him of this. Nakul immediately dashes out of the apartment when Updadhyay catches his scent. She chases him to a construction site where he manages to escape with the help of Jim. However Shloka who was at the construction site to help Nakul gets taken as hostage.

As Jim is driving Nakul to safety, it is revealed that he is the hired assassin who had killed the monks at Harshil monastery in his quest for the Elixir.

== Cast ==
- Gulshan Devaiah as Nakul
- Sulagna Panigrahi as Ayesha Mirani
- Anjali Patil as Shloka
- Heeba Shah as Karima Upadhyay
- Aakash Dahiya as Inspector Bir Singh
- Ratnabali Bhattacharjee as Maria Gomes
- Jamie Alter as Dr Goldfish
- Danish Sait as Jim
- Lalit Tiwari as Guruji
- Dhruv Sehgal as Kartik
- Robin Das as Fokatiya Baba
- Manav Awasthi as Ayesha's colleague

== Reception ==
Film Companion reviewed the show as "A Wickedly Entertaining Meditation On Death And Religion" further writing "Imagine being able to live forever. Life – and everyone else’s death – becomes a cruel joke. Drama becomes a never-ending punchline. Which is, literally, what Afsos is." Rolling Stones India wrote "Mercurial pace and plot of new black comedy/thriller surprises at every turn" further adding "The plot oscillates between surprise and suspense — you never know what’s going to happen and the characters’ highs and lows make you root for an ending you already know won't come your way."
