= Vijay Chendoor =

Indian actor and writer

- Occupations: Actor; writer
- Years active: 2008–present

Vijay Chendoor is an Indian actor and writer who works in Kannada-language films.

== Career ==
Vijay Chendoor worked as a writer for the film Rocky (2008) before making his acting debut with Swayam Krushi (2011) for which he also worked as the assistant director. Yash, whom he worked with in Rocky, recommended that Chendoor stars in his film Lucky (2012). He garnered recognition for his role as Thigne in the horror film 6-5=2 (2013). Regarding his role in the horror film Karvva (2016), a critic noted that "Tilak as the rich brat, Rohith as the smart conman and Vijay Chandour as the entertaining dubbing artiste ensure they keep the audience hooked with their performances". He went on to star in Humble Politician Nograj (2018) as Nograj's peon Manjunath. One critic stated that "One of the best points about the film is the combination of Nograj and Monjunath — Danish Sait and Vijay Chendoor. The chemistry and timing that the two share is commendable".

== Filmography ==
=== As an actor ===
- All films are in Kannada, unless otherwise noted.

Key
†	Denotes films that have not yet been released

Year	Film	Role	Notes
2011	Swayam Krushi		
2012	Lucky		
2013	6-5=2	Kumar (Thigne)	
2015	Krishna Leela	Bawa	
2015	Kanchana		
2016	Tyson		
2016	Matte Shh		
2016	Karvva	Chandru	
2017	Jilebi		
2017	Psycho Shankara		
2017	Nan Magale Heroine		
2017	Pataki	Constable	
2017	Once More Kaurava		
2018	Humble Politician Nograj	Monjunath	Nominated—SIIMA Award for Best Comedian
2018	Manjari		
2018	Padarasa		
2018	Rajasimha		
2018	Karshanam		
2018	Buckasura		
2019	Traya		
2019	Howla Howla		
2019	Gimmick		
2019	Odeya	College security guard	
2019	Avane Srimannarayana	Sudhakara	
2020	Gentleman	Auto driver	
2020	Bheemasena Nalamaharaja	Kenda	
2021	Govinda Govinda	Hari Dodkunde	
2022	Home Minister		
2022	Shubhamangala	Pre-wedding videography director	
2023	Spooky College		
2023	South Indian Hero	Director	
2024	Appa I Love You		
2024	Abbabba	Kempanna	
2024	Max	Constable Govind	
2025	Choo Mantar		
2025	Arasayyana Prema Prasanga		
2025	Kona		

=== Web series ===
Year	Title	Role	Platform
2022	Humble Politiciann Nograj	Monjunath	Voot

=== As writer ===
- Rocky (2008)
