= Varisu =

2023 Indian film by Vamshi Paidipally

- Theatrical release poster
- Directed by: Vamshi Paidipally
- Screenplay by: Vamshi Paidipally; Vivek
- Story by: Vamshi Paidipally; Hari; Ashishor Solomon
- Dialogues by: Vivek
- Produced by: Dil Raju; Sirish
- Starring: Vijay; Rashmika Mandanna; R. Sarathkumar; Shaam; Prabhu; Prakash Raj; Srikanth
- Cinematography: Karthik Palani
- Edited by: Praveen K. L.
- Music by: Thaman S
- Production companies: Sri Venkateswara Creations; PVP Cinema
- Distributed by: Seven Screen Studio
- Release date: 11 January 2023
- Running time: 175 minutes
- Country: India
- Language: Tamil
- Budget: est. ₹200−280 crore (Note: The film was made on a budget of ₹200 crore according to News18, whereas The Times of India stated that the film cost ₹280 crore to make. The budget also includes actor Vijay's remuneration of ₹120 crore.)
- Box office: est. ₹290–293 crore (Note: The New Indian Express stated that Varisu grossed ₹290 crore worldwide. Box Office India stated that the film grossed ₹293 crore worldwide in its lifetime.)

Varisu (/ˈvɑːˌrisʊ/ transl. Heir) is a 2023 Indian Tamil-language action comedy drama film directed by Vamshi Paidipally, who co-wrote the film with Hari, Ashishor Solomon and Vivek Velmurugan. Produced jointly by Dil Raju and Sirish under the banner of Sri Venkateswara Creations and PVP Cinema. The film stars Vijay in the main lead role alongside Rashmika Mandanna, R. Sarathkumar, Shaam, Prabhu, Prakash Raj, Srikanth, Jayasudha, Sangeetha, Samyuktha Shanmughanadhan, Nandini Rai, Yogi Babu, Ganesh Venkatraman and Suman. It focuses on an entrepreneur's youngest son being named the chairman of his father's business, much to the dismay of his two brothers.

The film was announced in September 2021 under the tentative title Thalapathy 66, as it is Vijay's 66th film in a leading role. Principal photography began in April 2022 and concluded in December. The film was shot mostly in Chennai and Hyderabad, with sporadic schedules in Visakhapatnam, Ballari and Ladakh. The music was composed by Thaman S, cinematography handled by Karthik Palani and editing was by Praveen K. L. The film was subject to numerous leaks during production, despite the efforts of the producers to contain them.

Varisu was released in theatres worldwide on 11 January 2023, in the week of Pongal. It received mixed reviews from critics with praise for Vijay's performance, music, action sequences and entertainment value but received criticism for the screenplay and melodramatic approach. It grossed around ₹290–293 crore at the box office.

== Plot ==
Vijay is the youngest son of an eminent billionaire entrepreneur, Rajendran Palanisamy. Vijay is disowned and thrown out of the house as he refuses to join the family business, instead deciding to launch a food delivery startup. Seven years later, Rajendran is diagnosed with stage IV pancreatic cancer with only 8 to 10 months to live. He decides to reveal his terminal condition and appoint one of his two elder sons, Jai or Ajay, as his successor before his impending death.

Rajendran plans to celebrate his 60th birthday and decides to announce both matters afterwards. Vijay gets invited at the behest of his mother, Sudha, who still considers him her son. Vijay arrives to find his house in disarray; Jai is cheating on his wife, Aarthi, and has an extramarital affair with another woman, Smita, while neglecting his spoilt daughter, Ria. Ajay is in a debt trap when he owes over ₹550 crore (equivalent to ₹600 crore or US$64 million in 2026) to Mukesh, a financier. When Ajay could not repay the money to Mukesh, he offered to leak his company's secrets to his father's business rival, Jayaprakash "JP". Once Rajendran learns that his tender details were leaked to JP, he swears to give that traitor hell. The two elder brothers do not speak with each other and try to sabotage each other to be their father's successor.

Meanwhile, Vijay meets Divya. She is Aarthi’s younger sister, From the very first time she saw Vijay at her sister’s wedding—though he was younger than her—she had a crush on him. After a few incidents, the duo fall for each other. During Rajendran's birthday celebration, JP, through Smita and Mukesh, reveals the duplicity of Jai and Ajay, which devastates the entire family. Aarthi decides to file for divorce from Jai when she learns of his affair with Smitha, and Rajendran loses a business deal to JP due to Ajay's treason. Realising that he cannot rely on his elder sons to run his business empire, Rajendran reaches out to Vijay, who initially refuses but later agrees to take over the business after learning about Rajendran's illness.

Jai and Ajay leave the house in jealousy and dismay and join hands with JP and Mukesh to get rid of Vijay as the chairman, but Vijay manages to cross the hurdles and neatly handles the family business. After Vijay rescues Ria from a human trafficking gang, Jai realises his mistakes and reconciles with Vijay, Aarthi, and the rest of the family. Vijay and Jai then team up to stop Ajay from selling their company's shares to JP and make him realise his mistakes. The entire family, now reunited, have a hearty meal together, much to the happiness of Rajendran and Sudha. When Rajendran dies, the three brothers perform his funeral together and scatter his ashes in Varanasi.

== Cast ==
- Vijay as Vijay Rajendran
- Rashmika Mandanna as Divya
- R. Sarathkumar as Rajendran Palanisamy
- Shaam as Ajay Rajendran
- Prabhu as Dr. Anand Padmanabhan
- Srikanth as Jai Rajendran
- Prakash Raj as Jayaprakash Amarendran "JP"
- Jayasudha as Sudha Rajendran
- Sangeetha as Aarthi Jai
- Yogi Babu as Kicha
- Ganesh Venkatraman as Mukesh Krishnan
- Murali Sharma as Raghuram
- Samyuktha Shanmuganathan as Swetha Ajay
- Sanjana Tiwari as Riya Jai
- Advaith Vinod as Prashant Ajay
- Harshitha Karthik as Harshitha "Harshu" Ajay
- Suman as Gautham
- Mime Gopi as Raju
- Pondy Ravi as Eeshwar
- Nandini Rai as Smitha
- Matthew Varghese as Mathew
- Nimisha Nambiar as Gautham's wife
- Sriman as Thambi Durai
- VTV Ganesh as Velraj
- Bharath Reddy as Police Officer
- D. R. K. Kiran as Anthony
- Boys Rajan as IAS officer
- Supergood Subramani as Police Officer
- Keerthi Shanthanu as herself

Cameo appearances

- S. J. Suryah as Adithya Mittal
- Khushbu Sundar (Deleted Scene)
- Jani Master as himself in the song "Thee Thalapathy"
- Sathish as Vijay's friend
- Gemini Ganesan as Palanisamy (photo presence)

== Production ==
=== Development ===
On 26 September 2021, Vijay's 66th film as lead actor was announced with the working title Thalapathy 66. Directed by Vamshi Paidipally, it is the first Tamil film produced by Dil Raju and Sirish under Sri Venkateswara Creations, and Paidipally's second Tamil film after Thozha (2016). Paidipally said the makers initially intended to announce the project early that year, but had to postpone their plans due to the second wave of the COVID-19 pandemic in India. Vijay was reported to receive a payment of ₹110 crore (US$12 million) for the film. He was also reported to be sporting two looks as the film would be set in two different time periods.

Paidipally wrote the story and screenplay along with Hari and Ashishor Solomon. Raju Murugan was signed as the dialogue writer but he opted out of the project due to other film commitments. Murugan was replaced by Vivek for additional screenplay and dialogues. Cinematographer Karthik Palani, editor Praveen K. L. and production designers Sunil Babu and Vaishnavi Reddy, were part of the film's technical crew. Dil Raju described the film as "family-centric" like most of Vijay's films from the 1990s. While several reports anticipated the film to be a Tamil-Telugu bilingual, the makers clarified that the film would be shot only in Tamil. The title Varisu was announced on 21 June 2022, the eve of Vijay's 48th birthday.

In an interview with Ananda Vikatan, Vamshi claimed that the film is a family entertainer in the baseline and not specific to the genre, as he felt necessary to include several elements that would cater to the target audience, especially while writing for a big star like Vijay. He did the same, keeping in mind with the star and his image, which he felt that every section of the audience — including children and seniors — would enjoy the film.

=== Casting ===
The story for the film was written keeping Mahesh Babu in mind and when the actor could not sign up for the film, the makers approached Allu Arjun, Prabhas and Ram Charan before finalising Vijay. In October 2021, Prakash Raj was reported to play a key role in the film, collaborating with Vijay after over a decade since Villu (2009). On 5 April 2022, the birthday of Rashmika Mandanna, it was announced that she would be the lead actress. It is her second Tamil film after Sulthan (2021). The makers initially wanted Pooja Hegde as the lead actress, but ultimately desisted since she was doing consecutive films with stars; Hegde had previously starred with Vijay in Beast (2022). R. Sarathkumar joined the cast the day after Mandanna's announcement.

On 26 April 2022, Shaam confirmed being a part of the film, collaborating with Vijay after Kushi (2000), in which film he acted in a minor role, and the following week, Yogi Babu also confirmed his presence in the film. Five days later, the production house confirmed Prabhu and Jayasudha as part of the cast, and two days later, Telugu actor Srikanth, Sangeetha Krish and Samyuktha Shanmughanathan. In early June, a photograph of Khushbu Sundar on the sets was leaked. Though she initially denied being part of the cast, her presence was confirmed on 26 October. According to Vijay, her role was minor. Khushbu's scenes were excluded from the theatrical cut due to length issues. On 23 August, Ganesh Venkatraman confirmed his presence in the film. In September, Sriman was confirmed to be a part of the film. At the film's audio launch on 24 December, Vijay announced that S. J. Suryah would play a cameo role.

=== Filming ===
The inaugural puja ceremony for the film's shooting was held on 6 April 2022 in Chennai, and was followed by filming of the first schedule. It took place at a specially constructed set at a film city in East Coast Road, Chennai and was completed on 15 April. Initially, 75% of the shoot was planned to take place in Hyderabad but Vijay requested the production to remain in Chennai to benefit the local FEFSI members, and the makers reportedly agreed. Despite this, the Hyderabad schedule began on 3 May, and concluded by 23 May. The Chennai schedule resumed on 3 June, with the recurring portions also being shot at the film city. This includes a song sequence and few talkie portions. Despite stringent measures taken by the production team, pictures taken from the sets were leaked onto the internet and by 15 June, the team planned to shift the shooting location to a private spot, resulting in the halt of filming. By 23 June 45% of filming was over, with another schedule to begin in July. The fourth schedule began on 5 July in Hyderabad, and completed within three weeks.

The team headed to Visakhapatnam for the fifth schedule in late-July; Paidipally planned to shoot the film in live locations in the city, and the details of the venue were undisclosed, in order to avoid fans gathering. Despite the Telugu Film Producers Guild's (TFPG) decision to halt shootings of Telugu films from 1 August 2022, Dil Raju, the head of TFPG, assured that the shooting of Varisu would continue as it was a Tamil-language film and not a bilingual. During the production in Hyderabad, several stills from the film were leaked, and fans criticised the supposed carelessness of the production house. In mid-August 2022, a song shoot was held featuring Vijay and Mandanna, and is choreographed by Jani Master. The team moved to Hyderabad for filming another song, with the lead pair and choreographer in September.

The final schedule commenced on 25 September, with two fight sequences and two songs left to be shot in this schedule. The filming was completed on 27 October 2022, except for patchwork sequences and a final song, which was shot from 14 to 19 November in Bellary. It was followed by the ongoing shooting of the climax sequences in Hyderabad, taking place for nearly 10 days. During the schedule, a reporter and his team flew drone camera over the shooting location, but was seized by the fans, preventing the reporter from getting footage from the sets. Post-production for the film went simultaneously in mid-November, and full-fledged post-production works would begin by December, once filming is wrapped. The technical team also travelled to Ladakh to capture montage sequences. Filming was completed in December.

== Music ==
In his first collaboration with Vijay, the music is composed by Thaman S. The album consists of five songs. The first single "Ranjithame" was released on 5 November 2022, the second single "Thee Thalapathy" on 4 December, and the third single "Soul of Varisu" on 20 December.

The audio launch was held on 24 December. The original soundtrack was released on 17 August 2023.

== Marketing ==
Varisu's first poster released on 21 June 2022, was criticised by a section of social media users, alleging to be plagiarised from the advertisements of the Otto clothing board, and also edited the poster to strengthen their claims. Replying to the trolls, the company had claimed that the image is not in any way related to the company. Outdoor promotions for the film began in early-December 2022, with the film's poster being wrapped in Chennai Metro trains, and in the Uzhavan Express train.

== Release ==
=== Theatrical ===
Varisu was released on 11 January 2023, in the week of Pongal, clashing with Thunivu. The film has dubbed versions in Telugu (titled Vaarasudu) and in Hindi. The Telugu version's release was initially in risk of being moved to an earlier date than the Tamil version as the Telugu Film Producers Council urged theatre owners to give first preference to release only direct Telugu films releasing in the states of Andhra Pradesh and Telangana during the week of Sankranti festival. Veera Simha Reddy and Waltair Veerayya were scheduled for the release on the festival on 12 and 13 January 2023 respectively. Despite this, the Tamil Nadu Film Producers Association announced that the Telugu version would release as planned after talks with the Telugu Film Producers Council. However, the Telugu version was later pushed to 14 January 2023 due to Raju choosing to let Veera Simha Reddy and Waltair Veerayya release first.

=== Distribution ===
In November, it was announced that Seven Screen Studios had acquired the Tamil Nadu theatrical rights for the film. They will further distribute the film through their sub-distributors: Shri Sai Combines (Tirunelveli and Kanyakumari), Five Star Films (Madurai), Radhu Infotainment (Tiruchirappalli and Tanjore) and distributor Senthil (Salem). Red Giant Movies will distribute the film in North Arcot, South Arcot, Chennai, Coimbatore and Chengalpet. Ahimsa Entertainment released the film in Tamil and Telugu in the United Kingdom. 4 Seasons Creations acquired the rights for distributing the film in European countries such as France, Norway and Netherlands. DMY Creations bought the distribution rights for Malaysia, and Home Screen Entertainment did so for Singapore.

=== Pre-release business ===
The film's non-theatrical rights were sold for ₹150 crore (US$16 million) including satellite, digital, audio and dubbing rights. Seven Screen Studios acquired the Tamil Nadu theatrical rights for ₹70 crore (US$7.5 million) in minimum-guarantee basis. The Hindi-dubbing rights of the film were sold for over ₹34 crore (US$3.6 million) crore.

=== Home media ===
The digital streaming rights were acquired by Amazon Prime Video, and the satellite rights were sold to Sun TV. The film premiered on Amazon Prime Video from 22 February 2023 in Tamil and dubbed versions of Telugu, Malayalam and Kannada languages.

== Reception ==
The film received mixed reviews from critics. On the review aggregator website Rotten Tomatoes, 66% of 8 critics' reviews are positive, with an average rating of 5.9/10.

M Suganth of The Times of India gave the film 3.5 out of 5 and wrote "Vijay is in terrific form, cracking one-liners that have us break out into a smile, make self-referential punches and show earnestness in the sentimental moments". Prem Udayabhanu of Onmanorama narrated Varisu as "A throwback to the formula era – a mix of traditional family values a prodigal heir and a fortune awaiting business inheritance". Latha Srinivasan of India Today gave the film 3 out of 5 and wrote "Though the film is reminiscent of some Telugu films, Vijay keeps us engaged with his comedy and action".

Srinivasa Ramanujam of The Hindu wrote "Beyond Varisu's staid plot and saccharine emotional beats, that's what stays in your mind in this Vamshi Paidipally directorial". Priyanka Thirumurthy of The News Minute gave the film 3.5 out of 5 stars and wrote "In short, Varisu is a predictable but enjoyable family drama. After all, the fact that 'family is difficult' is a universal emotion". Haricharan Pudipeddi of Hindustan Times wrote "As a viewer if you had walked in with your expectations in place after watching the trailer, you won't be disappointed".

Kirubhakar Purushothaman of The Indian Express gave the film 3 out of 5 and wrote "There's no novelty to the experience. We wait for one mass moment after the other or one joke after the other. That makes Varisu more of a product than a film". Navneet Vyasan of News18 gave the film 3 out of 5 stars and wrote "The screenplay has enough elements of a family entertainer. It has enough twists and turns too. In all this drama, Vijay excels in a perfect popcorn film that will see theatres come alive again". Priyanka Sundar of Firstpost wrote "Not that they aren't valid, but they are so used to the subliminal messaging of women treated as nothing but trophies, and belonging in the kitchen that they don't see a point is calling it out".

Navein Darshan of Cinema Express gave the film 3.5 out of 5 stars and wrote "The best among them is Vijay casually taking a dig at family dramas while making a confident statement". Vivek MV of Deccan Herald gave the film's rating 2.5 out of 5 stars and wrote "Beast from Nelson's was a misfire, yes, but it was at least encouraging to see Vijay collaborating with a youngster. He took that path with Master first, where he responded to the sensibility and style of a new-gen filmmaker. With 'Varisu', it seems that the actor has played it safe". Lakshmi Subramanian of The Week gave the film's rating 1.5 out of 5 and wrote "Although the music is sufficiently peppy and there are some emotional scenes, the movie has nothing new to offer and may disappoint even hardcore Vijay fans".

== Controversies ==
Sri Venkateswara Creations was accused by the Animal Welfare Board of India (AWBI) of using elephants in the film, violating the Performing Animal (Registration) Rules 2001 by not seeking permission from the AWBI before filming. The AWBI ordered Sri Venkateswara Creations to submit an explanation to them for their violation within seven days, or face legal action.
