= Eashvar Karthic =

Indian filmmaker and actor

- Occupations: Film director, Actor
- Years active: 2017 – present

Eashvar Karthic is an Indian film director and actor, who works in Tamil and Telugu cinema. He made his directorial debut in Tamil with the mystery-thriller film Penguin (2020).

== Early life ==
Karthic says that he grew up idolizing Jackie Chan and was inspired by the action films Rumble in the Bronx (1995) and Who Am I? (1998). However, it was after watching Mani Ratnam's Idhayathai Thirudathe on television that he decided to be a part of the film industry. Prior to his career in cinema, he had worked in the software industry and later in banking before transitioning into filmmaking in 2013.

== Career ==
He initially set out to become an actor after leaving his bank job and worked in theatre, where he also discovered his talent for writing. After a struggle of seven years, he got an acting role in Magalir Mattum (2017) and V1 Murder Case (2019). By then, he realized that he was more inclined to film direction.

For over two years, he struggled to find opportunities until his friend Linga, who also acted in Penguin, introduced him to Vijay Sethupathi. Vijay Sethupathi was impressed with one of his scripts and asked him to reach out to Stone Bench Films, leading to the inception of Penguin (2020). Eashvar completed the shoot for Penguin in thirty six days. His debut directorial has also been mentioned in several research journals that discuss women-centric films, OTT during the COVID-19 pandemic and representation of the subaltern. It was also the first major Tamil film to get a direct OTT release during the pandemic.

In 2024, Eashvar made his Telugu directorial debut Zebra, a financial crime thriller film starring Satyadev, Dhananjaya, Priya Bhavani Shankar, and Amrutha Iyengar. Ravi Basrur was roped in as the music director. Zebra was in its post-production phase in 2023.

== Filmography ==
Key
†	Denotes films that have not yet been released

=== As a film director ===
Year	Title	Language	Ref.
2020	Penguin	Tamil	
2024	Zebra	Telugu	

=== As an actor ===
Year	Title	Role(s)	Language	Ref.
2019	V1 Murder Case	Avinashi	Tamil	
2021	Boomika	Krishna	Tamil	
