= Danish Sait =

Indian actor and comedian

- Born: 1 July 1987 (age 39)
- Other names: RJ Danish Sait; Mr. Nags
- Occupations: Stand-up comedian; Television host; Radio jockey; Actor; Writer
- Years active: 2013–present
- Spouse: Anya Rangaswami (m. 2021)
- Relatives: Kubbra Sait (sister); [{Yasmin Sait}] (Mother); Tanveer Sait (uncle); Azeez Sait (grandfather)

YouTube information
- Channel: Danish Sait
- Years active: 2012–present
- Genres: Sketch comedy and Parody Interviews
- Subscribers: 244 thousand
- Views: 29.57 million
- Last updated: 30 December 2025
- Website: danishsait.com

Danish Sait (born 1 July 1988) is an Indian comedian, television host, and film actor who prominently works in Kannada cinema.

== Career ==
Danish Sait worked as a radio for Supari on Fever 104 FM in 2013. On the channel, he made several prank calls and enacted an array of fictional roles including Asgar, Chacko, Nagesh and Nagraj. He is also a stand-up comedian and is a part of the Bengaluru-based comedy group The Improv. Starting in 2014, he hosted several sports shows including Pro Kabaddi League and the Cricket World Cup in 2015 before hosting Neevu Bhale Khiladi, a reality television show on Star Suvarna. He made his film debut with the Kannada movie Humble Politician Nograj in 2018 and portrayed the titular character in the film in addition to co-writing the film with director Saad Khan. The film released to positive reviews with one critic stating that "Danish Sait never fails to draw the audience, irrespective of where and how he plans to entertain. What is appealing is that he remains true to the character of Nograj". In 2020, he starred in the Hindi-language web series Afsos as a tourist in Mumbai. That same year, he starred in the comedy French Biriyani as an auto driver along with Sal Yusuf, whom he worked with in The Improv. In the film, he reprised the role of Asgar from his prank calls. He starred in 777 Charlie alongside Rakshit Shetty.

He has worked with the Bengaluru-based cricket team Royal Challengers Bangalore in the Indian Premier League as an anchor and mascot for the team, he also plays as Mr. Nags on the RCB Insider Show.

== Personal life ==
His sister Kubbra Sait is an actress while his uncle Tanveer Sait is a politician. His grandfather, Azeez Sait, was a minister in Karnataka. He married Anya Rangaswamy, a graphic designer.

== Filmography ==
- All films are in Kannada, unless otherwise noted.

Key
†	Denotes films that have not yet been released

=== Films ===
Year	Title	Role	Notes	Ref.
2018	Humble Politician Nograj	Nograj	Also writer and lyricist for "Problem Song"	
2020	French Biriyani	Asgar		
2022	One Cut Two Cut	Gopi	Also writer	
2022	Sold			
2022	777 Charlie	Karshan Roy		
2024	Malaikottai Vaaliban	Chamathakan	Malayalam film	
2024	Dange / Por	Church Father	Hindi-Tamil bilingual film; cameo	

== Television ==
Year	Title	Role	Channel	Notes
2014	WOW Awards	Host	Zoom TV	
2014	Pro Kabaddi League Season 1	Host	Star Sports	
2015	The Live Quotient Awards	Host	Zoom TV	
2015	Cricket World Cup	Host	Star Sports	
2015	The RCB Insider Series	Host	Star Sports	
2015	Pro Kabaddi League Season 2	Host	Star Sports	
2015–16	Neevu Bhale Khiladi	Host	Star Suvarna	
2016	The RCB Insider Series	Host	Star Sports	
2017	62nd Filmfare Awards	Emcee	Sony Entertainment	
2017	The RCB Insider Series	Host	Star Sports	
2018	Cricbuzz Live on Cricbuzz	Host	Star Sports	
2018	Improv All Stars: Games Night	Himself	Prime Video	English television film
2020	Afsos	Jim	Prime Video	web series
2022	Humble Politician Nograj	Nograj	Voot Select	Web Series, creator, producer
2026	Space Gen: Chandrayaan	Jairam Shetty	JioHotstar	

== Awards and nominations ==
Year	Award	Category	Work	Outcome	Ref.
2018	Outlook Social Media Awards	Breakout Star of the Year	—N/a	Won	
2018	Wow Awards Asia: Live Quotient Awards	Best Master of Ceremonies for Corporate & Lifestyle Events - Male	—N/a	Won	
2019	8th South Indian International Movie Awards	Best Debutant Actor	Humble Politician Nograj	Won	
2021	10th South Indian International Movie Awards	Best Actor	French Biriyani	Nominated	
