= Humble Politiciann Nograj =

- Theatrical poster
- Directed by: Saad Khan
- Written by: Danish Sait; Saad Khan; Vamsidhar Bhogaraju
- Screenplay by: Saad Khan
- Produced by: Pushkara Mallikarjunaiah; Hemanth M Rao; Rakshit Shetty
- Starring: Danish Sait; Vijay Chendoor; Sumukhi Suresh; Roger Narayan; Sruthi Hariharan
- Cinematography: Karm Chawla
- Edited by: Jagadeesh; Ram Sabare; Chandni Asnani
- Music by: Sricharan Pakala; Debajit; Jeet Singh; DJ Jasmeet; Prajwal Pai
- Production companies: Pushkar Films; Lost & Found Films; Paramvah Studios
- Release date: January 12, 2018
- Running time: 145 minutes
- Country: India
- Language: Kannada

Humble Politiciann Nograj is a 2018 Indian Kannada-language satire comedy film written and directed by Saad Khan. The film stars Danish Sait, who plays the title character of Nograj, a narcissistic politician. The film was produced by Pushkara Mallikarjunaiah, Hemanth M Rao and Rakshit Shetty under the banners Pushkar Films, Lost & Found Films, and Paramvah Studios, respectively. The movie was inspired by the 2012 American movie The Campaign.

== Plot ==
Nograj (Danish Sait) is a corrupt corporator of a fictitious constituency called DS Nagar along with his faithful assistant Monjunath (Vijay Chendoor), whose MLA, Jagatprabhu F. Kumar, abbreviated JFK (Hanumanthe Gowda), treats corporators as his servants and steals credit for their public achievements. Nograj encounters this firsthand when Nograj repaves a road (at 3 times the actual cost) but JFK takes credit. Intending to take JFK out, Nograj and his fellow OBP corporators orchestrate a garbage collector strike and run a massive parking scam, all to stoke anger against JFK. The resulting public anger causes the president KG Byrappa (Akki Basappa) to refuse to let JFK stand in the upcoming MLA election. Nograj convinces the party secretary Gurudas Bhat (Raghu Ramakoppa) to advocate for his candidacy to the vice president of OBP Michael Narayan (Srinivas Prabhu), but Gurudas also says he needs to be noticed first. To this end, Nograj bribes the electrician Kempaiah to shut off the power grid. Nograj publicly threatens to cut himself if the power is not returned, which leads to restoration of power.

Arun Patil (Roger Narayan), an honest NRI leading a pharmaceutical startup sees the incompetence of the government and decides to try and change it by running for MLA. Patil actually focuses on implementing solutions to problems instead of stoking hatred. In addition, Patil discovers Nograj is behind a scam that is charging people inflated prices for water from tankers, leading to constant water shortages. However, he refuses to release the information as a normal politician like Nograj himself would. For his main speech, Nograj and Monjunath unsuccessfully break into Patil's office to steal his manifesto for their own speech. Although Patil's co-workers ask him to release the footage of Nograj's break-in, Patil refuses, saying there are more important things for him to focus on. During their speeches, Patil clearly lays out how he could make positive changes in government while Nograj just talks nonsense to paid supporters.

Nograj creates controversies to make Patil seem worse. Nograj tails Patil and doctors footage of him helping his wife Rama (Sruthi Hariharan) in a store to claim he had harassed her. He also coerces a former Muslim employee of Patil's company to claim he was fired for his religion when he actually had sold pharmaceuticals in the black market. Nograj eventually meets Patil at his house and finds him kind and honest, and begins to think twice about all the mudslinging he is doing. After Monjunath gets him to remember his true goals of making as much money as possible, Nograj lets Monjunath and his other helper Pramod (Vamsidhar Bhogaraju) beat Nograj up and blames his injuries on Patil, which quickly gains media attention.

On election day, Nograj's gang uses dirty tricks to ensure voter fraud like handing out alcohol, money, etc. At the announcement of results, Nograj wins but tricks Patil into thinking that he will give the title to Patil, then takes the victory. He says that Patil, like everyone else, should be a citizen because he believed Nograj was genuine and celebrates wildly with OBP party workers. When Rama asks Patil why he didn't reveal Nograj's water scam, he says he would never stoop to Nograj's level.

== Cast ==
- Danish Sait as Humble Politician Nograj, who strives to become the MLA in the election
- Vijay Chendoor as Monjunath, Nograj's personal assistant
- Sumukhi Suresh as Lavanya, Nograj's wife and reason why he became a politician
- Roger Narayan as Arun Patil, the honest opponent of Nograj
- Sruthi Hariharan as Rama, Arun Patil's wife
- Vamsidhar Bhogaraju as Pramod, one of Nogaraj's main thugs
- Raghu Ramankoppa as Secretary Gurudas Bhat, the secretary of OBP
- Hanumanthegowda as Jagatprabhu F Kumar Aka JFK, the MLA Nograj wants to replace
- Pramod Shetty as Shankar, Arun Patil's personal assistant and campaign manager
- Shiv Manju as Nanjundaiah, a fellow corporator of OBP and friend of Nograj
- Srinivas Prabhu as Michael Narayan, vice-president of OBP
- Akki Basappa as K.G. Byrappa, president of OBP
- Mohammed Ashraf as Azam Khan, a Muslim corporator from OBP and Nograj's friend
- Roopesh Naik
- Vinay Krishnaswamy as Prof. Narasimha, first victim of Nograj's scams
- Nitesh Nittur as Doctor in Nograj's dream sequence
- Puneeth Rajkumar as himself, in a cameo role as the chief guest at a college commencement

== Production ==
After Danish Sait's popularity playing Nograj in various radio shows and YouTube videos, his long-time producer and friend Saad Khan wrote a film with him based on the same character. They wrote the story in 4 days. Pushkara Mallikarjunaiah, Hemanth M Rao and Rakshit Shetty jointly produced the film.

== Soundtrack ==
The soundtrack is composed by Telugu music director Sricharan Pakala in his Kannada debut and compromises of a single song titled "Problem Song". The song features lyrics by Danish Sait, Aditya Parashar, Vamsidhar Bhogaraju and Suni and is sung by Aditya Parashar and Poojan Kohli.

== Release ==
The film was released in Bangalore on 12 January. The film was released in Australia, New Zealand, Germany and the United States.

The film was made available on Amazon Prime Video on 7 February and was the first Kannada film to be released on Prime.

=== Reception ===
The movie received generally positive reviews.

The Times of India gave the film a rating of three out of five stars and stated "Watch it for Nograj, Monjunath and some LOL moments, with a pertinent message in the end". Bangalore Mirror in its review noted that "The film may not resonate with everyone for the same reason that Nograj makes his opponent in the film realise. However, it is an honest effort at a purposeful film."

Indian Express rated the film a rating of three-and-a-half out of five stars and stated "The real victory of Humble Politician Nograj writers Danish Sait and Saad Khan lies in their effort to create a sensible film backed with a clear plot, story, screenplay and cleverly-written dialogues."

== Awards and nominations ==
Year	Award	Category	Nominee	Outcome	Ref.
2019	8th South Indian International Movie Awards	Best Debutant Actor	Danish Sait	Won	
2019	8th South Indian International Movie Awards	Best Actor In A Supporting Role	Roger Narayan	Nominated	
2019	8th South Indian International Movie Awards	Best Comedian	Vijay Chendoor	Nominated	
2019	8th South Indian International Movie Awards	Best Debut Director	Saad Khan	Nominated	

== In popular culture ==
Nograj is the mascot of the Royal Challengers Bangalore cricket team. Indian comedy YouTuber duo Jordindian also made a collab with Danish Sait, reprising his role as a politician while calling himself "Politician Uncle".

== Spin off ==
A ten episode web series named Humble Politiciann Nograj was released on Voot Select with Sait and Chendoor reprising their respective roles and Disha Madan in a pivotal role.
