= CandyFlip =

Indian psychedelic thriller film

- Directed by: Shanawaz NK
- Story by: Shanawaz Nellikunnil
- Produced by: Balasubramanyam TC; Surendra K Hegde
- Starring: Prashant Prakash; Prakash Raj; Kalki Koechlin; Gulshan Devaiah; Valeriya Polyanychko
- Cinematography: Nagaraj Rathinam
- Edited by: Anadi Athaley
- Music by: Naren Chandavarkar (Background Score)
- Production company: 23 Entertainment
- Release date: 15 February 2019
- Running time: 93 minutes
- Country: India
- Languages: English; Hindi

CandyFlip is a 2019 Indian English/Hindi psychedelic thriller film directed by Shanawaz NK. This directorial debut film is produced by 23 Entertainment.

== Plot ==
Set in present-day Goa, CandyFlip is a story about what happens to a man named Roy, who owns a shack in Palolem, after he takes LSD for the first time.

== Cast ==
- Prashant Prakash as Roy
- Prakash Raj as Joseph
- Kalki Koechlin as Emily
- Gulshan Devaiah as Altaf
- Valeriya Polyanychko as Maya
- Sal Yusuf as Cokeman

== Production ==
Candyflip released in Netflix on 15 February 2019.
