= Anil Krish =

Indian film director and editor

- Other name: Anil Krishnan
- Occupations: Director; editor
- Years active: 2014–present

Anil Krish is an Indian film director and editor who works in Tamil cinema.

== Career ==
After watching the short film Kasappu Inippu directed by Srihari Prabaharan, Aruna Guhan and Aparna Guhan, the great-granddaughters of A. V. Meiyappan selected Srihari along with his friend Anil Krishnan to write a script for their film, Idhuvum Kadandhu Pogum (2014). The film was released directly on YouTube. Anil Krishnan's short film The Lost Paradise was selected to be a part of the anthology film Bench Talkies (2015).

== Filmography ==
Year	Film	Credited as		Notes
Year	Film	Director	Editor	Notes
2014	Idhuvum Kadandhu Pogum	Yes	Yes	
2015	Bench Talkies	Yes	Yes	Segment: The Lost Paradise
2020	Penguin	No	Yes	
2022	Kuruthi Aattam	No	Yes	
2024	Zebra	No	Yes	Telugu film
2025	Chiquita	No	Yes	America film
