= Next Nuvve =

- Theatrical release poster
- Directed by: Prabhakar Podakandla
- Written by: Deekay
- Produced by: K. E. Gnanavel Raja; Bunny Vasu
- Starring: Aadi; Vaibhavi; Brahmaji; Rashmi Gautam
- Cinematography: Karthik Palani
- Edited by: S. B. Uddhav
- Music by: Sai Karthik
- Production company: V4 Movies
- Release date: 3 November 2017
- Running time: 144 minutes
- Country: India
- Language: Telugu

Next Nuvve (transl. You're next) is a 2017 Indian Telugu-language horror comedy film directed by Prabhakar Podakandla. It stars Aadi, Vaibhavi, Brahmaji, and Rashmi Gautam. The film is about four protagonists trying to uncover the mystery behind a haunted palace. The film was a remake of the Tamil film Yaamirukka Bayamey which itself was based on the Korean film The Quiet Family.

== Plot ==
Kiran (Aadi Saikumar), a TV serial director loses a lot of money after his serial is shelved and is in deep debts. He, along with his girlfriend Smita (Vaibhavi Shandilya) learn about a dilapidated ancestral palace in Araku Valley through a letter sent by his late father, and they decide to convert it into a resort and make money to clear their debts, for which he cons the son of JP (Jayaprakash Reddy), his creditor, and flees for Araku with Smita. He takes the help of Sharath (Brahmaji) and his bombshell sister Rashmi (Rashmi Gautam) in converting the palace into a resort.

Starting from the first day, customers start coming in. A couple named Anandam and Sadanandam, a Chinese woman, her husband and their two family members, a drillmaster and a bodybuilder all die within one night of stay at the premises, except a schoolteacher and a bunch of kids. They dig graves and cover them up. The local digger tips the police after observing that they have been digging in the ground several times. He finds this suspicious and thinks that they are searching for some treasure underground. When Kiran is questioned by the police, he tells them that his guests have mysteriously died. The police check the register and find the names. However, the police tell him that all these people were the former owners of the palace, who had already died years before in the same manner how they died in his resort, within a few days of registering it in their name.

Kiran comes to the palace and informs others that the guests had already died years before after checking the register of his resort, finding out that they wrote the address of his resort. Meanwhile, they encounter an old man (L. B. Sriram) who tells them that this palace is haunted by a devil (Himaja) and that he accidentally released it when he was allured by its human form, and it will kill whoever buys the palace, indicating that Kiran will be next. They try to seek the help of RGV (Raghu Babu), an exorcist, who turns out to be a cheat and is beaten by the devil. At the day of full moon (Ammavasya), the devil attains superpowers and possesses Smita, Sharath and Rashmi in an attempt to kill Kiran. In the ensuing melee, JP and his son along with his gang break into the palace. He forces Kiran to transfer the ownership of the palace to him, despite the latter's attempts to dissuade him.

As Kiran and his group come out of the palace the ghosts of the former owners start going inside, with JP and his gang joining them, implying that the ghost has killed them. Lamenting about them, Kiran and his group leave the palace.

== Cast ==
- Aadi as Kiran
- Vaibhavi as Smita
- Brahmaji as Sharath
- Rashmi Gautam as Rashmi
- Himaja as Ghost
- L. B. Sriram as Ghost Lover
- Ramjagan as the drillmaster who purchases the house after the China batch in 1989
- Srinivas Avasarala as Younger Ghost Lover
- Jaya Prakash Reddy as JP, a moneylender whose son Kiran cons and escapes
- Benarjee as Inspector
- Satya Krishnan as School Teacher
- Duvvasi Mohan
- Pruthvi Raj as himself (cameo appearance)
- Raghu Babu as RGV
- Posani Krishna Murali as Kiran's late father
- Thagubothu Ramesh as Gunta Babji
- Mumaith Khan
- Rajitha
- Sri Charan
- Getup Srinu
- Raghava as Sadanandam, the first owner of the palace who gets killed by the ghost in a freak accident in 1987
- Anurag
- Subhash

== Soundtrack ==
Next Nuvve

Soundtrack album by Sai Karthik
- Released: 2017
- Length: 9:20
- Language: Telugu
- Label: Aditya Music
- Producer: Sai Karthik

Sai Karthik chronology
Raja the Great (2017)	Next Nuvve (2017)	Ego (2018)

The soundtrack was composed by Sai Karthik, with lyrics written by Krishna Kanth.

Track list
No.	Title	Singer(s)	Length
1.	"Ala Meda Mida"	Yazin Nizar	3:20
2.	"Arey Life Ante"	Dhanunjay	3:35
3.	"Aachi Thuchi (Theme)"	Aparna Nandan	2:25
