= Karthik Palani =

Indian cinematographer (born 1985)

- Born: 6 December 1985 (age 40)
- Occupation: Cinematographer
- Years active: 2010–present

Karthik Palani is an Indian cinematographer who works in Telugu cinema. After debuting with Love Shagun (2016), Palani has since worked in Next Nuvve (2017), Penguin (2020) and Adipurush (2023).

== Career ==
Karthik worked as an assistant to Tirru during Mercury (2018) and Petta (2019). He also worked as an assistant cinematographer in several Hindi, Telugu, and Tamil-language films. He garnered acclaim for his work in Penguin (2020). A critic from The Times of India noted that "Karthik Phalani's visuals help set the eerie mood" whilst a critic from The Hindu stated how "The filmmaker, however, revelation in terms of his visual sense. Two shots come to mind that are beautifully imagined and shot". His next film was the Kannada film French Biriyani (2020). A critic noted that "Cinematographer Karthik Palani has created the right atmosphere and has employed quirky camera moves to keep us in tune with the film's proceedings".

In 2020, Karthik started working on Adipurush, directed by Om Raut. It was based on the Hindu epic Ramayana. The filming involved combining motion capture technology with live action similar to the methods used on The Jungle Book (2016) and Planet of the Apes (2011).

Karthik is collaborating with Maruthi again after Brand Babu (2018) for The RajaSaab (2026), starring Prabhas in his second collaboration with him following their work on Adipurush.

== Filmography ==
Year	Title	Language	Notes
2016	Love Shagun	Hindi	
2017	Next Nuvve	Telugu	
2018	Zeenat	Hindi	
2018	Brand Babu	Telugu	
2020	Penguin	Tamil	
2020	French Biriyani	Kannada	
2023	Varisu	Tamil	
2023	Adipurush	Hindi; Telugu	
2026	The RajaSaab	Telugu	
