= Disha Madan =

Indian internet celebrity

- Born: Bangalore
- Education: College of Fine Arts, Bengaluru
- Occupation: actress
- Years active: 2014–present
- Spouse: Shashank Vasuki Gopal (m. 2017)
- Children: 2

Disha Madan is an Indian actress and social media personality. She is known for her works in Kannada-language television shows and films. She is also famous on the social media platform TikTok.

== Career ==
Disha Madan made her television debut with the first season of Dancing Star and won the season title along with Tsunami Kitty in 2014. She also played the role of Vachana in the soap opera Kulavadhu before leaving the show to help her father with his business. On musical.ly, she was the first Indian to have a million followers. She has 2.6 million followers as of July 2018. In 2018, she was set to star in the web series Hate You Romeo with Aravinnd Iyer, which is yet to release. In 2020, she starred in the movie French Biriyani as a news reporter. She also bagged a role in the web series sequel to Humble Politician Nograj.

== Personal life ==
She is married to Shashank Vasuki Gopal and they have a son named Vian Shashank Vasuki, born on 27 July 2019 and a daughter named Avira Vasuki, born on 1 March 2022. . She attended College of Fine Arts, Bengaluru

== Filmography ==
Year	Title	Role	Notes
2020	French Biriyani	Malini	

== Television ==
Show	Role	Channel	Notes
Dancing Star	Herself	ETV Kannada	Winner
Kulavadhu	Vachana	Colors Kannada	Replaced by Amrutha Ramamoorthi
Humble Politician Nograj	Simmi	Voot	Web Series
Laxmi Nivasa	Bhavana	Zee Kannada	
