= The Improv (TV series) =

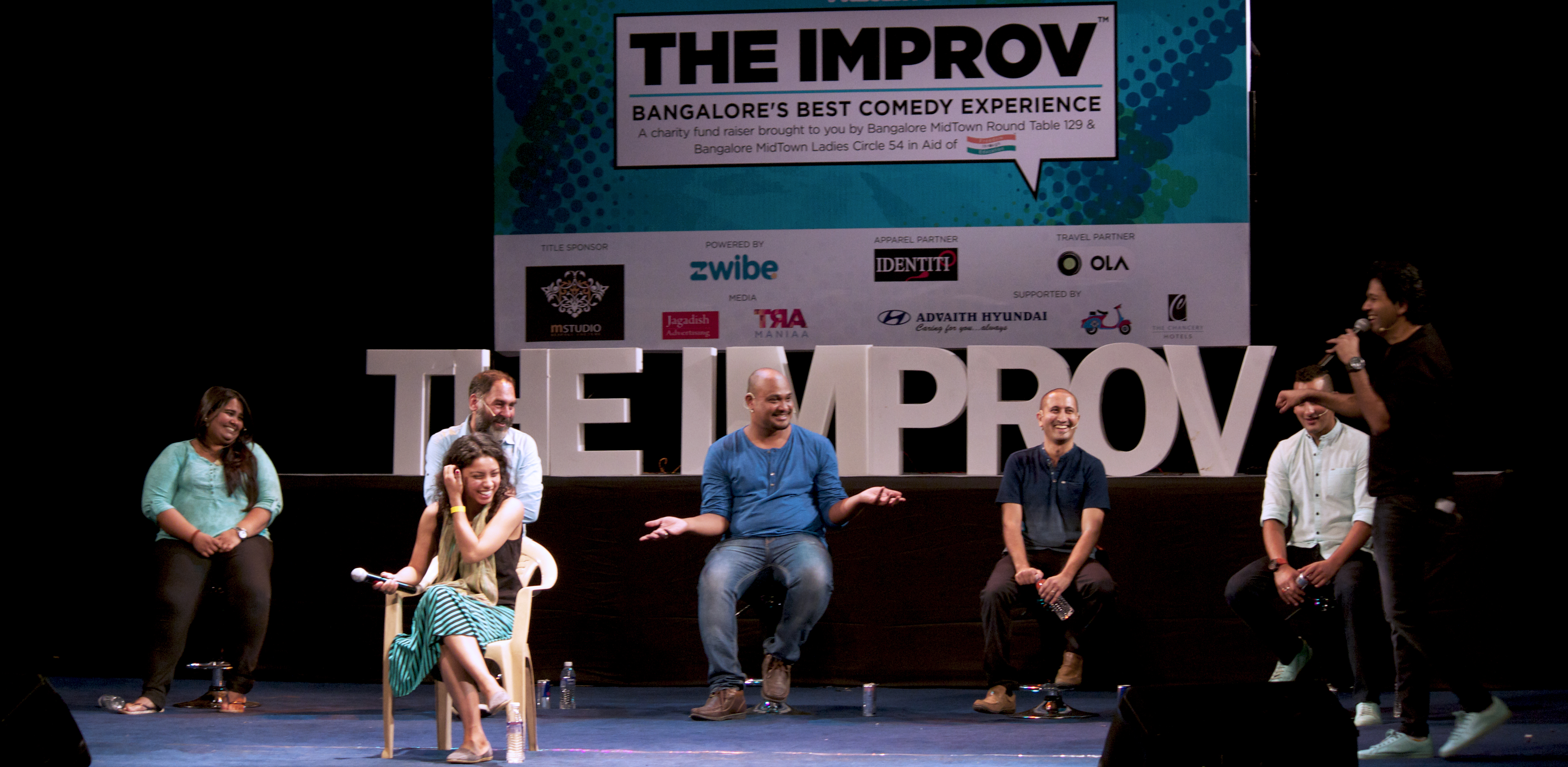
- The Improv performing during a show
- Genre: improvisational
- Created by: Saad Khan
- Presented by: Saad Khan
- Starring: Abel Mathews, Sal Yusuf, Darius Sunawala, Richa Kapoor, Tim Schultz
- Country of origin: India

Production
- Production company: CenterStage India

The Improv is an improvisational comedy show which was started in May 2012 in Bangalore, India. The show has no script and is totally improvised, as its name suggests. The audiences give suggestions, situations and scenarios to the host and taking the cue, the actors create on-the-spot hilarious scenes on stage. It is hosted and directed by Saad Khan, an Indian filmmaker. The show is conceptualized by Saad Khan. The show's performers are Sal Yusuf, Darius Sunawala, Abel Mathews and Tim Schultz. The team has performed over 100 shows in Bangalore, Hyderabad, Mumbai, Chennai, Dubai, Abu Dhabi and Sweden.

== Background ==
The show was created in May 2012 by Saad Khan. College mates, Khan and Sundar spent hours in their campus canteen performing improvisational scenes together. Such impromptu performances in college earned them an early audience, who cheered and motivated them. After college, they pursued their respective media careers and Khan left for the US for further studies. On Khan's return to India he started Centerstage in 2011. On May 6, 2012, Centerstage launched The Improv in Bangalore which had actors on stage performing many scenes without any rehearsal or script and from situations given by the audience. Since then they have performed over 100 shows in Indian cities like Bangalore, Hyderabad, Mumbai, Chennai and their first overseas performance was in the UAE in April 2014. In 2016, THE IMPROV was selected and invited to the Sweden International Improv Festival that takes place at the Regina Theatre in Uppsala every year. Saad's team was the only Indian outfit performing at SWIMP and the audiences couldn't stop raving about the show's format and energy of the improvisers. They have had shows for varied audiences like in the general public, corporate houses, college fests, and communities. The show was featured on NDTV prime for its uniqueness, production value and organic reach.

== Format ==
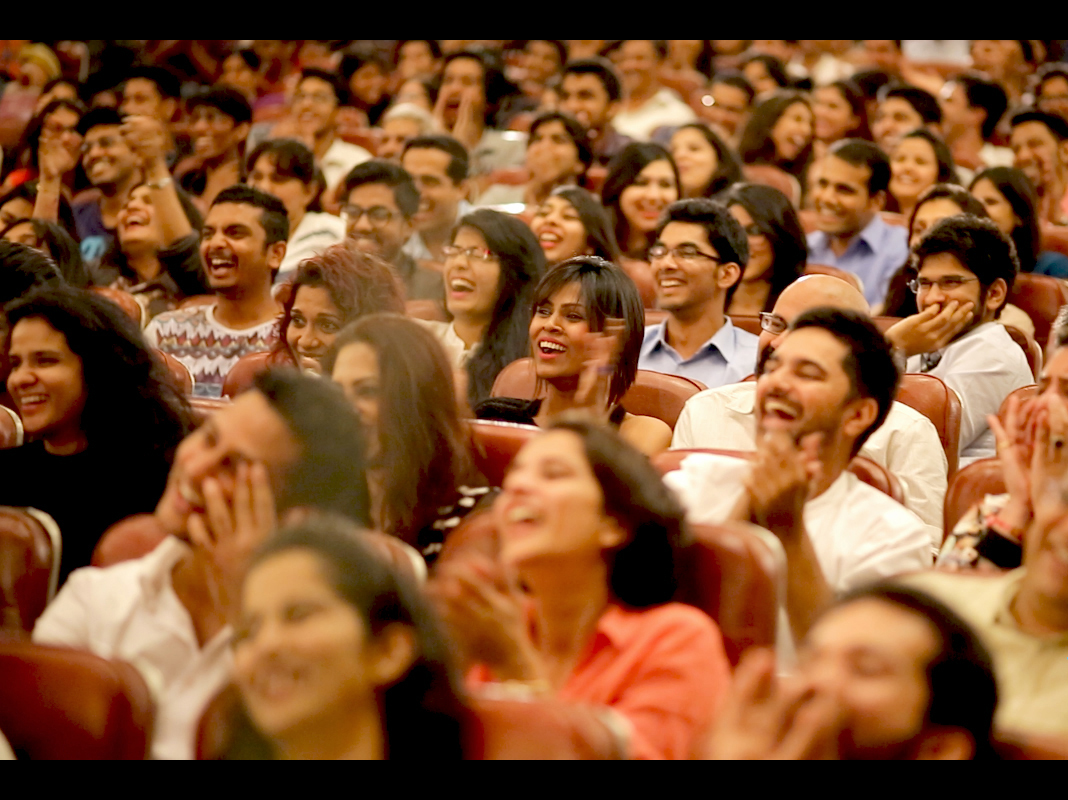
Audience enjoying an Improv show

Every show of The Improv has four to five rounds. Each round has a prefix ‘SHUT UP AND’. The first round is a general improvisation round called ‘SHUT UP AND IMPROV’ where a general situation, topic or location is given by the audience to the host who assigns roles and scenarios to the performers, who must improvise and perform a skit on the spot. The popular rounds of THE IMPROV are Freeze, Switch and Rotate.

Freeze: Where the actors are frozen during the scene and a type of film genre or emotion is taken from the audience and the scene continues. Switch: Where 2 actors are given characters that don't get along with each other. One actor starts aggressive and the other submissive. The host calls out 'Switch' and the actors switch between these emotions. Rotate: It is an improv game for 4 actors. Each actor is assigned an occupation, type of sport, accent and place. Every time the host calls out 'Rotate' the actors shift from one position to the next.

== Uniqueness ==
The Improv, though similar in its genre as the popular show Whose Line is it Anyway, is quite unique indeed. The only common ground between The Improv and Whose Line is it Anyway is improvisation. The Improv amalgamates acting, spontaneity, interactive banter, entertainment, group dynamic, audience involvement and live reactions. The Improv and its followers have chosen the ring finger, also known as the ‘Other Finger’ or the ‘Finger of Happiness’, as their symbol. It is a tongue in cheek contrast to the middle finger and its inappropriateness. Another highlight of the show is the interactions of the host with the audience. Known for his sarcastic sense of humour, Saad Khan brings out quirky suggestions from audience members.

== The team ==
The show is hosted and directed by Saad Khan and produced by Maaz Khan. The on-stage improvisational actors on the show are:

- Richa Kapoor- School teacher and actor
- Darius Sunawala - RJ & Actor
- Sal Yusuf - Actor and Comedian
- Tim Schultz - Writer, Actor and Comedian
- Abel Mathews- Actor and Comedian
- Siddharth Sundar - Actor
- Danish Sait - Actor
- Sumukhi Suresh - Comedian and actress
- Praveen Raj - Comedian
