= Penguin (film) =

2020 film by Eashvar Karthic

- Official release poster
- Directed by: Eashvar Karthic
- Written by: Eashvar Karthic
- Produced by: Karthik Subbaraj; Kaarthekeyen Santhanam; Sudhan Sundaram; Jayaram
- Starring: Keerthy Suresh
- Cinematography: Karthik Palani
- Edited by: Anil Krish
- Music by: Santhosh Narayanan
- Production companies: Stone Bench Creations; Passion Studios
- Distributed by: Amazon Prime Video
- Release date: 19 June 2020
- Running time: 132 minutes
- Country: India
- Language: Tamil

Penguin is a 2020 Indian Tamil-language mystery thriller film written and directed by Eashvar Karthic in his directorial debut. The film was produced by Kaarthekeyen Santhanam, Sudhan Sundaram and Jayaram, under Stone Bench Films, backed by Karthik Subbaraj, and Passion Studios respectively. It stars Keerthy Suresh as a pregnant woman on the journey of solving the mystery of her first child's disappearance.

The project was announced in August 2019. Eashvar Karthic wrote the script within 18 days, and shooting was completed within 36 days between September and November 2019 at Kodaikanal. The film features cinematography by Karthik Palani and editing was done by Anil Krish; the film has music scored by Santhosh Narayanan.

Penguin was released directly through Amazon Prime Video on 19 June 2020, after a theatrical release failed to happen due to the COVID-19 lockdown in India. The film received mixed reviews from critics, praising the performance of Keerthy and the cinematography whereas the inconsistent writing received criticism.

== Plot ==
Rhythm, a young woman residing in Kodaikanal, is married to Raghu and has a child named Ajay. One day, near a lake, Ajay goes missing while playing with his friends. The friends inform Rhythm, that he went with a stranger donning a Charlie Chaplin mask. Rhythm frightens and calls police. Police couldn't find him. She mourns in grief. Rhythm's harrowing mission on searching Ajay for 6 years fails. Raghu yells and blames Rhythm for carelessness and divorces her. Then a kind hearted businessman Gautham, consoles and marries her, and impregnates her. She was on 7th month. On a random evening, She drove through the same abandoned lake where Ajay missed and gets frightened by a sinister-looking stranger in a Charlie Chaplin mask. She hurries back to car and drives back. Suddenly Ajay stands in the road en-route. She shockingly rescues him and takes to hospital. She realises that he is her missing child. Gowtham stands by her side. Raghu also rushes to hospital to see his missing child.

The doctor informs them that Ajay has been tortured by his kidnapper and has not spoken a word.

Raghu apologizes for his behavior and lets Ajay go home with Rhythm. But Ajay's behaviour was suspicious as he didn't even spoke a word. But one night at home, Rhythm overhears Ajay singing Twinkle, Twinkle Little Star, and had drawn images of Charlie Chaplin dressed kidnapper still following him.

After series of suspicious events, Ajay attempts to stab Rhythm but stops. Later the kidnapper breaks into Rhythm's house and communicates with Ajay via sign language. Rhythm tries to stop the kidnapper but he overpowers her and escapes. The remaining film revolves around Rhythm & mission to find the kidnapper and suspects various peoples including Dr. David, who is Ajay's health consultant. But the mission reveals bitter and twisted truths, and the kidnapper turns to be Bhavana, Rhythm's close friend. She kidnapped Ajay, tortured him, fed him raw meat, manipulated him to kill Rhythm. She did all these out of jealousy and shot herself to death during climax. Ajay turns back to playful nature. Rhythm continues her life with Ajay, newborn child & Gowtham.

== Cast ==
- Keerthy Suresh as Rhythm aka Ritu
  - Riya Manoj as Young Rhythm
- Linga as Raghu
- Madhampatty Rangaraj as Gautham Siddharth
- Advaith Vinod as Ajay
  - Umar as young Ajay
- Mathi as Dr. David
- Muthazhagan as Charlie Chaplin
- Nithya Kriupa as Bhavana
  - Sai Jivitha as young Bhavana
  - Shakthi as teenage Bhavana
- Harini Rameshkrishnan as Abhi
- Thejank as Kathir
- Maddy as Cyrus
- Murali as Bhavana's father
- Aishwarya Ramani as Anjana
- Uma Shankar as Bhavana's mother
- Tharini Suresh as Anjana's mother

== Production ==
=== Development ===
"I was glued by the narration of Eashvar. I'm not only playing a mother in the film, but she is also pregnant so the role was even more challenging. Though Mahanati was a proper female-centric film, it wasn't a direct Tamil film so when I was looking for the right project in Tamil, Eashvar came up with this script and I completely loved it. Only during interviews, I realised that playing a pregnant woman is a big deal".

— Keerthy Suresh, in an interview with Firstpost.

In August 2019, it was announced that Keerthy Suresh had signed on an untitled "mystery thriller" film to be produced by Karthik Subbaraj under his banner Stone Bench Films, and directed by debutant Eashvar Karthic. The film, which was Stone Bench's third production venture, was also produced by Kaarthekeyen Santhanam, Sudhan Sundaram and Jayaram under the banner Passion Studios. It also marked as Keerthy's second female-centric film, after her performance in Mahanati (2018), which received critical acclaim. Eashvar wrote the script of the film within a span of 18 days. The film was launched as a Tamil and Telugu bilingual; however, the Telugu version was dropped in favor of a dubbed release.

The film's technical crew members included Santhosh Narayanan as the film's composer, Karthik Palani was chosen to handle the cinematography, whereas Anil Krish took in charge of editing the film. Karthik Palani assisted Tirru, before making his debut as the cinematographer in the film, he stated the preparation work took around three months, further adding that the fairly limited time allotted for shooting, did help in a cause, despite the unpredictable weather. He also experimented with camera angles which he stated that no recent Tamil film has had as many wide shots.

On 17 October 2019, the makers unveiled the first look of the film, revealing the title as Penguin. The first look features Keerthy playing a pregnant woman in the film. Keerthy, in an interview with Scroll.in, described the film as "an emotional thriller, which is mostly about motherhood and the bond between mother and son. It's about the trauma she experiences when she loses her son. The whole story is set over four days, during which she tries to find her son." Apart from Keerthy, the film features Linga and Madhampatty Rangaraj in pivotal roles in addition to several newcomers.

=== Filming ===
Principal photography began on 12 September 2019 at Kodaikanal. Keerthy had experienced about the film's shooting in cold destinations such as Kodaikkanal, and also about the challenges faced during early starts and long days. During the shooting in Kodaikanal, the shooting lights fell on a beehive and disturbed the bees, which stung many crew members including Keerthy, and it was after treatment that Keerthy and the team resumed shooting. Principal photography wrapped on 3 November 2019.

== Soundtrack ==
Penguin's original soundtrack album features only one song composed by Santhosh Narayanan. Titled "Kolame", it was composed by Santhosh at his Future Tense Recording Studio located in Chennai, and he composed the songs and background score of the film, during the period of the COVID-19 lockdown in India, after when the Tamil Nadu government granted permission for post-production works of the film. According to a source report, it stated that Penguin’s music album is one of the first albums to have been completely created during this ongoing period.

"Kolame" was released as a single on 16 June 2020, by composer Anirudh Ravichander, who also released its Telugu version "Praname", and Malayalam version "Omale", simultaneously on the same day. Susha lent the vocals for the song in both the versions, which had lyrics written by Vivek for the Tamil and Malayalam version, while Vennelekanti wrote its Telugu version.

The soundtrack album features seven instrumental tracks, along with the song "Kolame" which was released by Sony Music South, on 10 August 2020. The album also features an additional track "Thaai" (only for the Tamil version), which had lyrics written by Vivek and sung by Anand Aravindakshan. It was not included in the soundtrack album or film but released separately on 2 September 2020.

Track listing
No.	Title	Singer(s)	Length
1.	"Kolame"	Subiksha Rangarajan	5:01
2.	"Chase" (Instrumental)	–	0:52
3.	"Killer Found" (Instrumental)	–	2:27
4.	"Nee Venum Theme" (Instrumental)	–	2:26
5.	"Penguin Theme" (Instrumental)	–	1:06
6.	"Ruthless Monster" (Instrumental)	–	1:18
7.	"Through the Hills" (Instrumental)	–	2:58
8.	"Umbrella Man" (Instrumental)	–	2:19
9.	"Thaai"	Anand Aravindakshan	5:28

== Release ==
Penguin was originally scheduled for a theatrical release. However, on 15 May 2020, the streaming service Amazon Prime Video announced that the film would be made available directly on the service from 19 June 2020, as a result of theatres being closed due to the COVID-19 lockdown. It became the second Tamil film to have a direct-to-streaming release during the lockdown, after Ponmagal Vandhal which released that year. The film was released simultaneously in Tamil with dubbed versions in Telugu and Malayalam.

== Reception ==
Penguin received mixed reviews from critics. S. Srivatsan of The Hindu wrote, "Penguin is not a bad film but Eashvar's idea of writing suspense gets clumsier as the story progresses, the film is inconsistent for the most part, despite some brilliantly-imagined sequences." Shubra Gupta of The Indian Express gave the film 1.5 out of 5 stars stating "Keerthy Suresh tries to make the best of a bad job, and is quite a sight when squaring up to monsters, but the proceedings let her down." M. Suganth of The Times of India gave the film 2.5 out of 5 stars stating "Eashvar Karthic provides us the answers in this emotional thriller that might be underwhelming compared to recent serial killer thrillers, but isn't a total letdown, especially for a first film. Part of its success is due to the convincing performance of Keerthy Suresh, which brings out the vulnerability and the strength in this character."

Gauthaman Bhaskaran of the News18 gave 1.5 out of 5 stating "A thriller that loses its way not long after it begins to roll." Nandini Ramanath of Scroll.in stated that "Eashvar Karthic's 132-minute film stumbles along on the strength of its visuals and Keerthy Suresh's suitably fraught performance." Karthik Keramalu from The Quint gave the film 3 out of 5 stars and stated "Keerthy Suresh gave a good performance but the thriller itself was lazy". Baradwaj Rangan of Film Companion stated "Even the title has no motivation, unless you consider that the penguin is a bird that cannot fly. This is a film that never takes off."

In a positive note, Ranjani Krishnakumar of Firstpost gave 3 out of 5 stating "Penguin draws a clear line – this is a story about a mother. Rhythm is only that. For her, and for the film, that is enough." Sowmya Rajendran of The News Minute gave 3.5 out of 5 stating "Penguin has its moments and Keerthy Suresh indeed makes the film very watchable. But it is probably time to ask if this pressure to include 'twists' isn't killing a good story only because it seems too simple." Haricharan Pudipeddi of Hindustan Times stated "Keerthy Suresh proves yet again she's an artist with a lot of potential. If not for her commendable performance, the film would’ve struggled to make an impact with its convoluted writing. She owns the film from the first frame to the last, and she delivers one of her career-best performances."
