= List of Kannada film actresses =

This is a list of notable actresses who appear in Kannada cinema, primarily based in Karnataka.

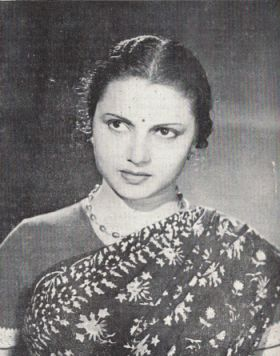
1940s: M. V. Rajamma

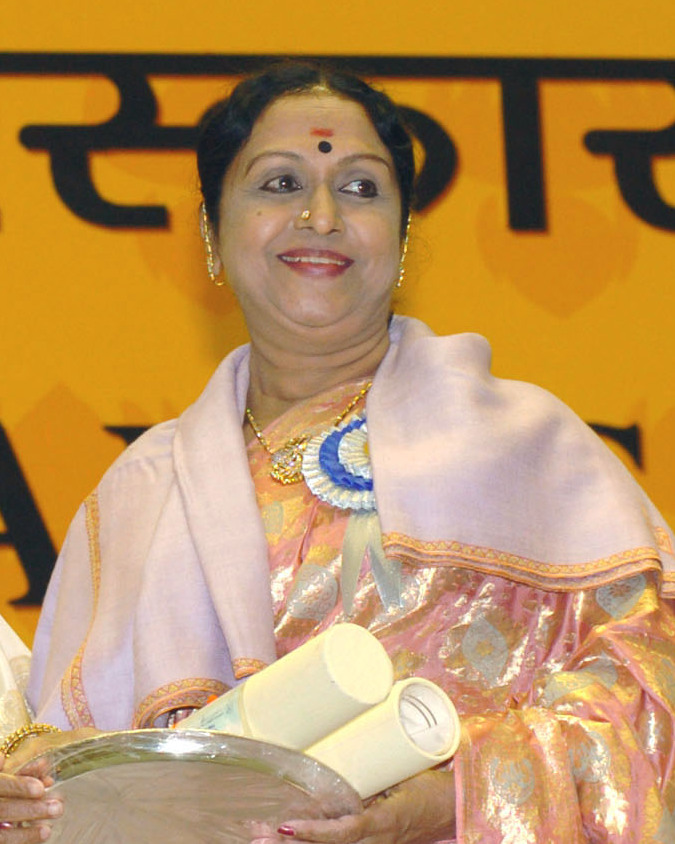
1950s: B. Saroja Devi

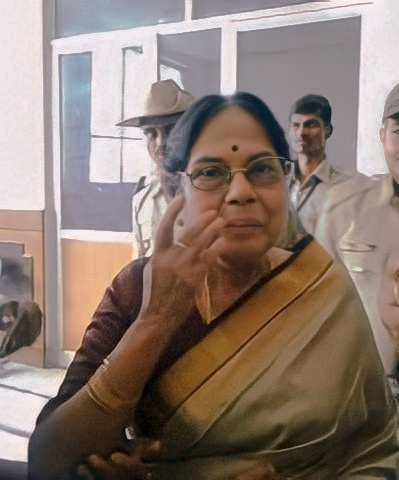
1960s: Leelavathi

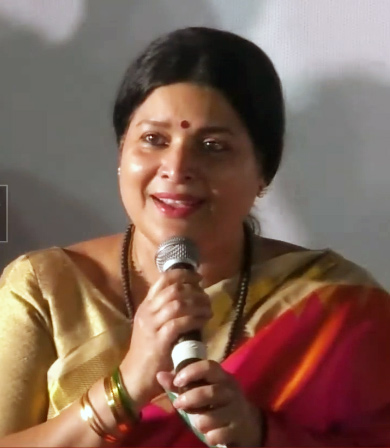
1970s: Jayamala

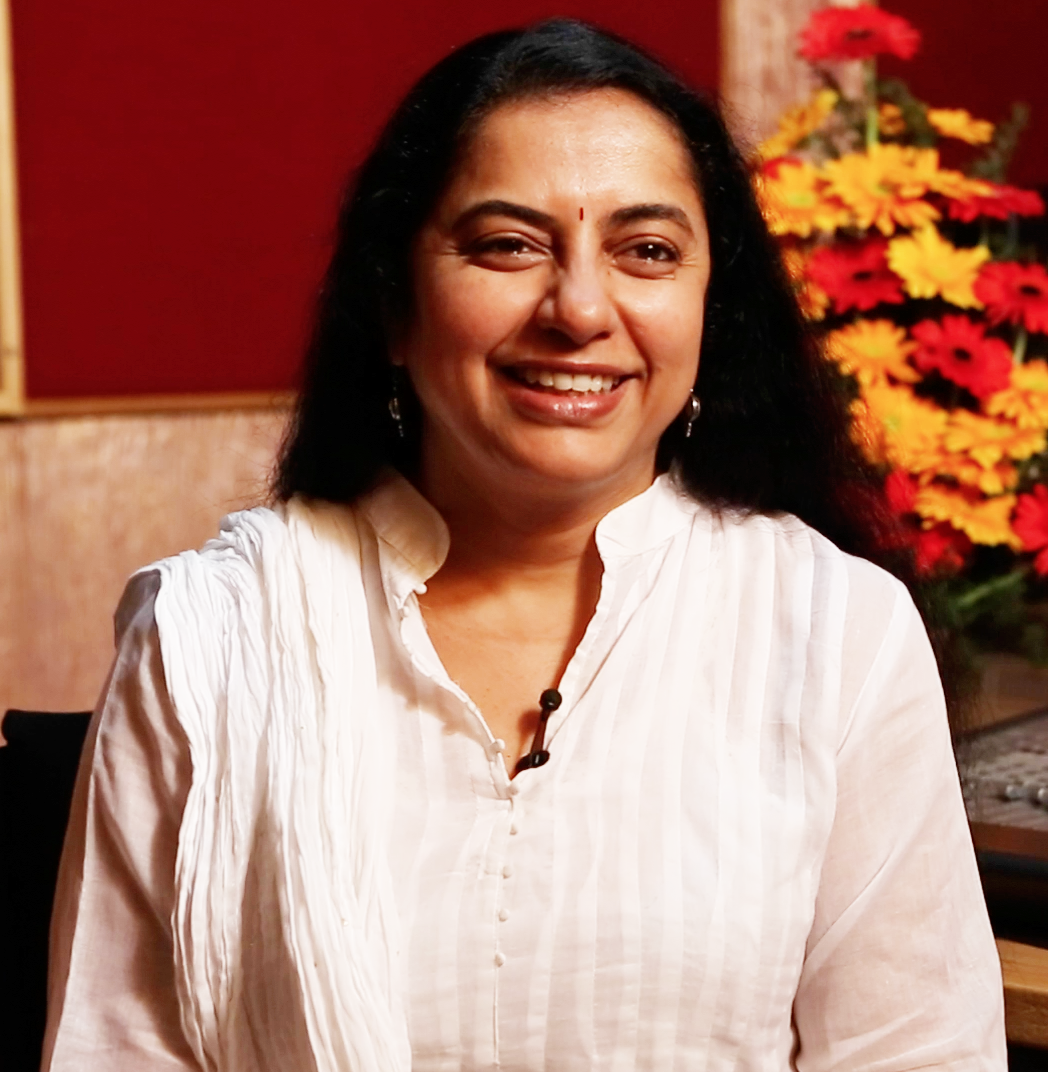
1980s: Suhasini

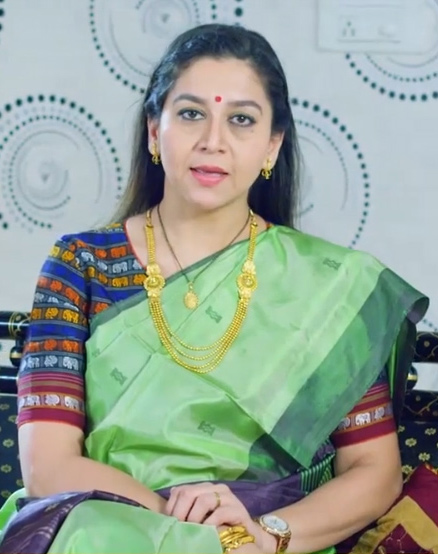
1990s: Sudha Rani

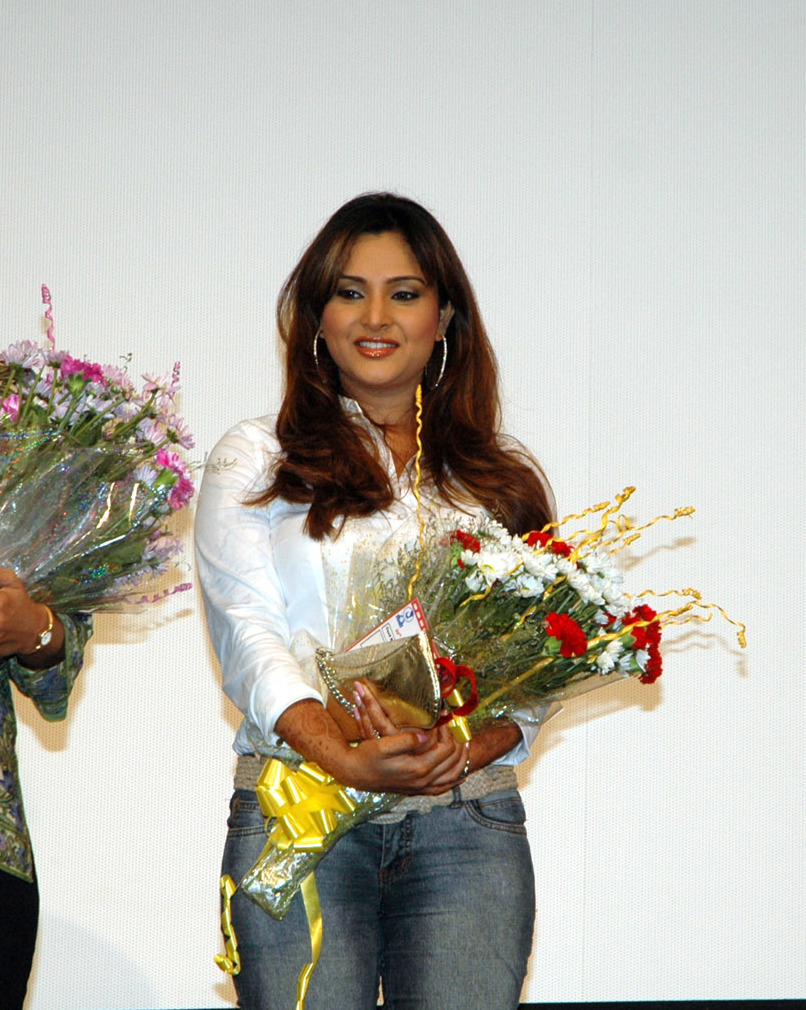
2000s: Ramya

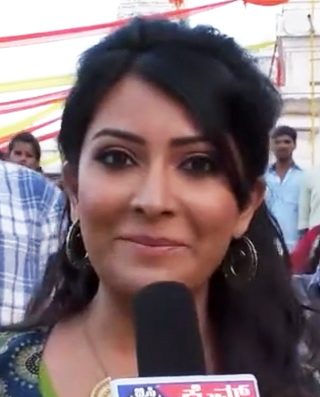
2010s: Radhika Pandit

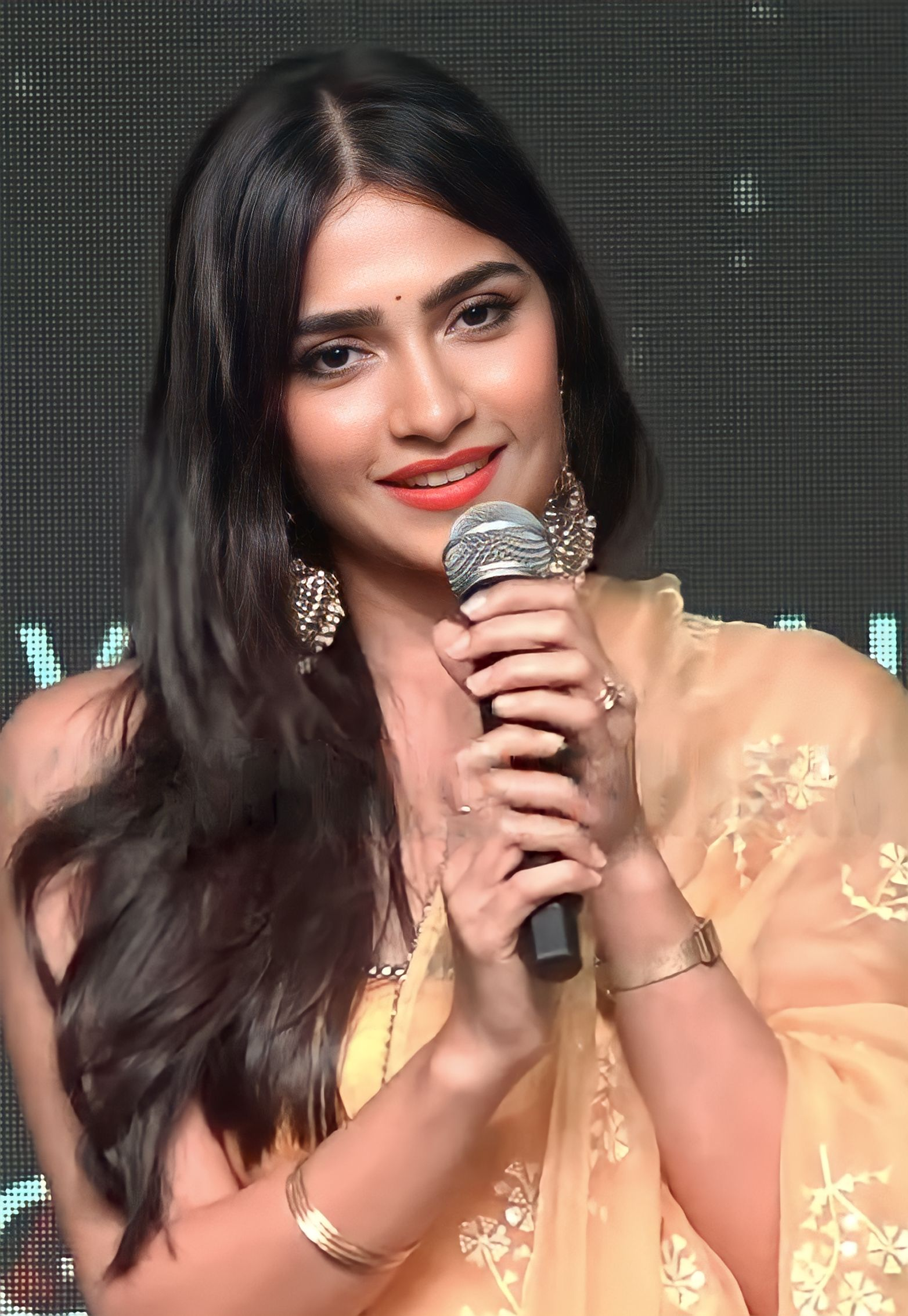
2020s: Rukmini Vasanth

== A ==
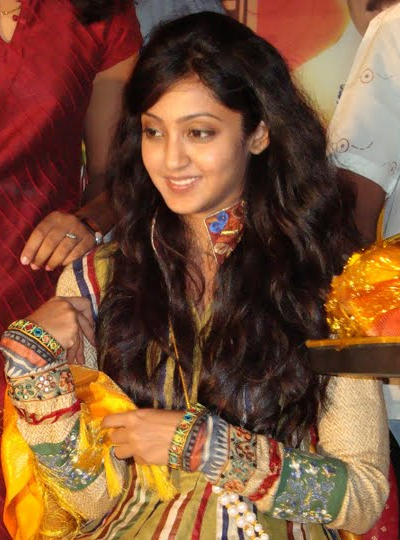
Aindrita Ray

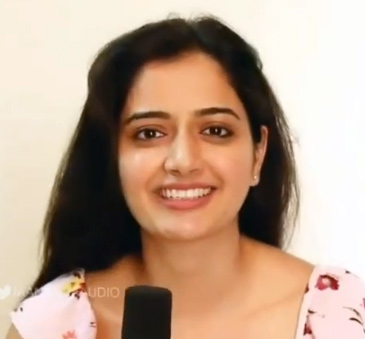
Ashika Ranganath

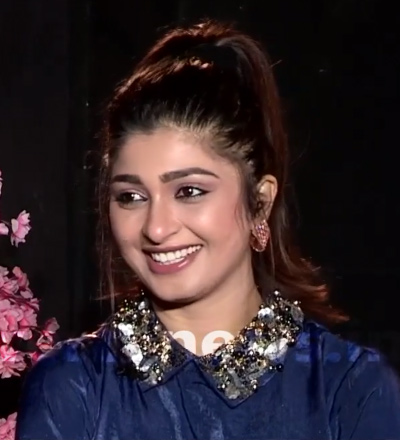
Aditi Prabhudeva

- Aamani
- Abhirami
- Aarathi
- Anu Mehta
- Aindrita Ray
- Amulya
- Asha Bhat
- Amy Jackson
- Ambika
- Archana Jois
- Amrutha Iyengar
- Anu Prabhakar
- Anushree
- Archana
- Archana
- Aruna Irani
- Arundhati Nag
- Anupama Gowda
- Asha Sharath
- Asha Parekh
- Amritha Aiyer
- Asmita Sood
- Aishani Shetty
- Akshara Gowda
- Aruna Balraj
- Aishwarya Arjun
- Avantika Shetty
- Aditi Prabhudeva
- Ashika Ranganath
- Anita Hassanandani
- Advani Lakshmi Devi

== B ==
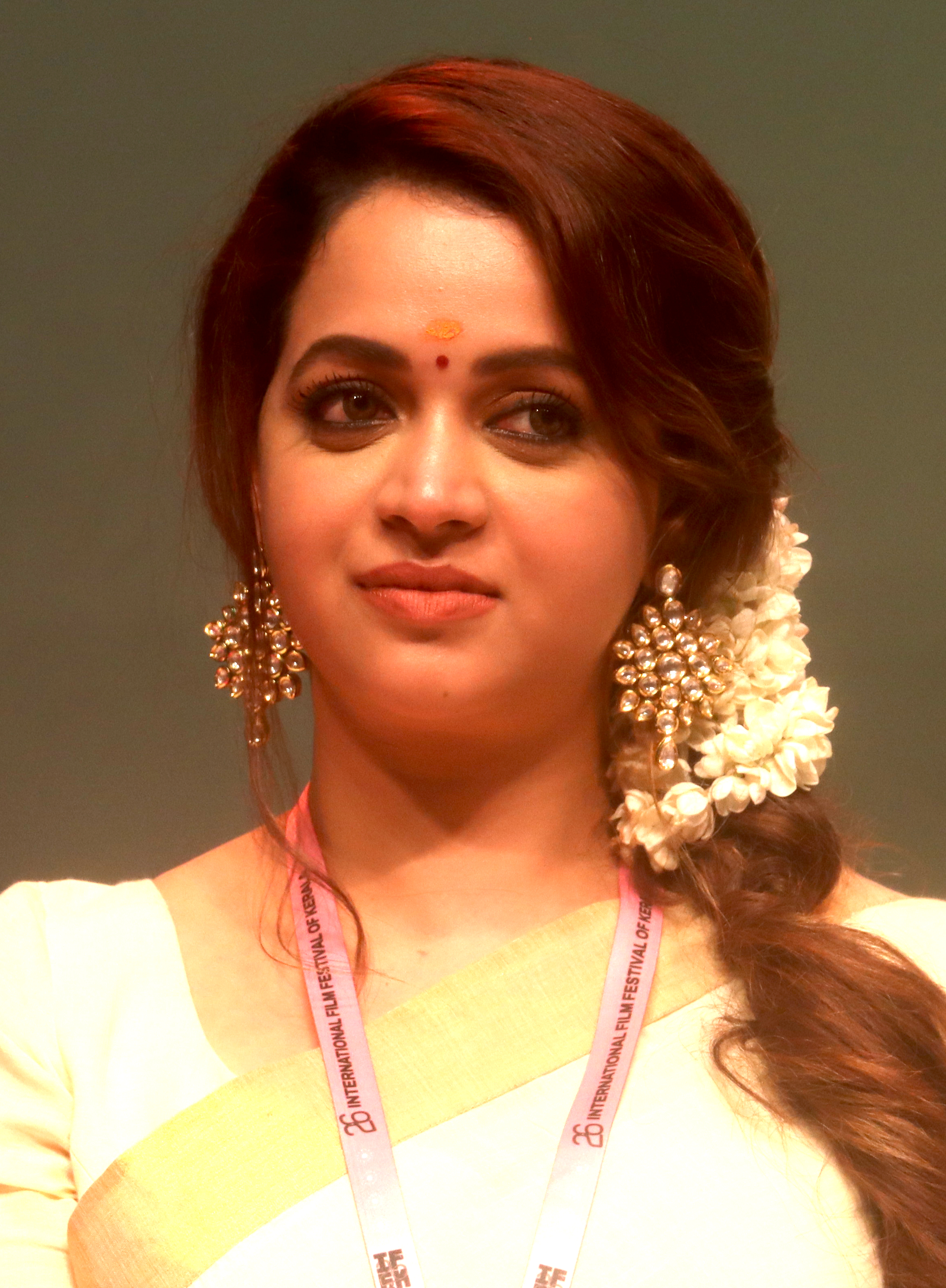
Bhavana

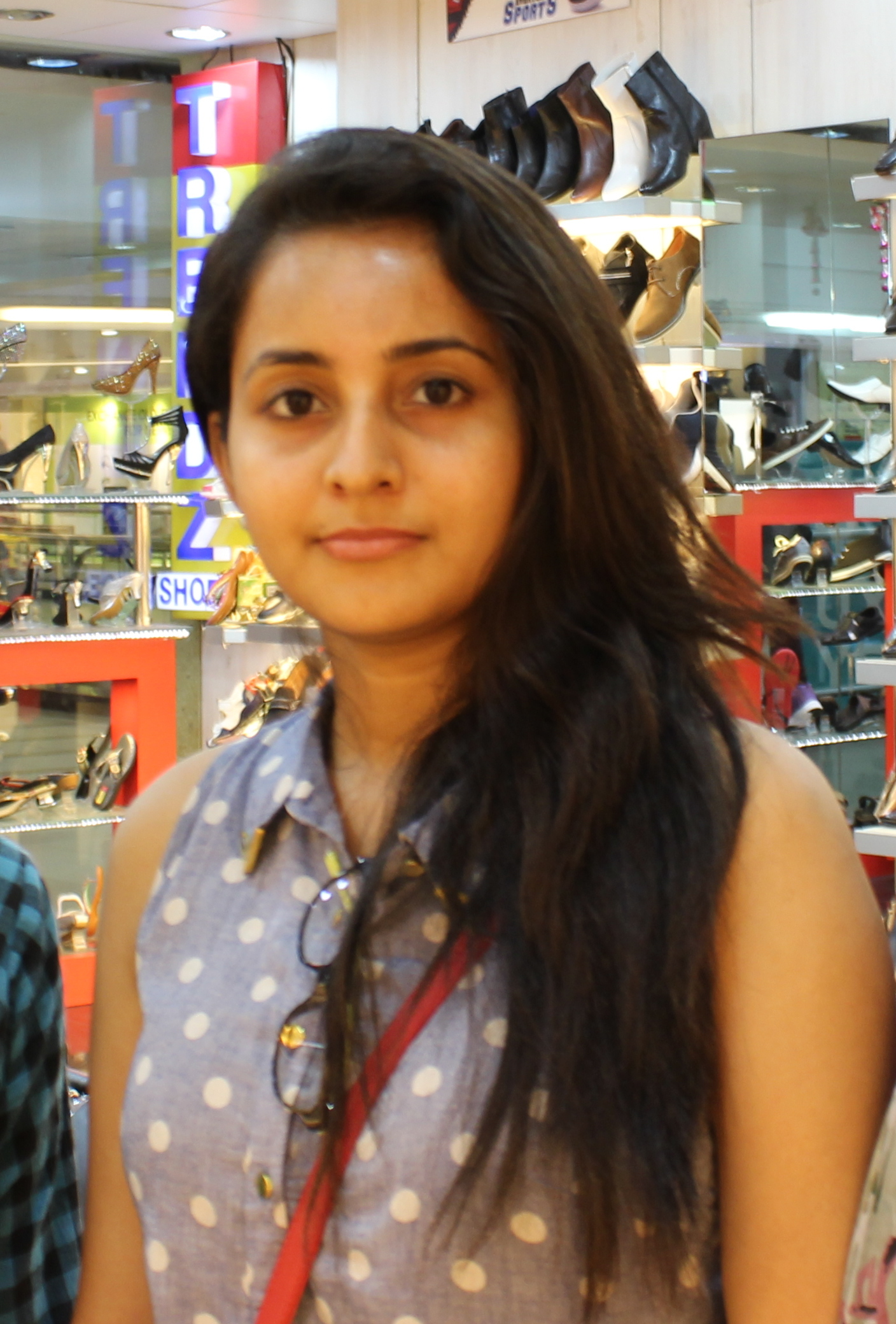
Bhama

- Bhama
- Bhanupriya
- Bhavya
- Bhagyashree
- Bhavana
- Bhavana
- Bhavana Rao
- Bhoomi Shetty
- Bharathi Vishnuvardhan
- Bhargavi Narayan
- Bhumika Chawla
- B. Jayashree

== C ==
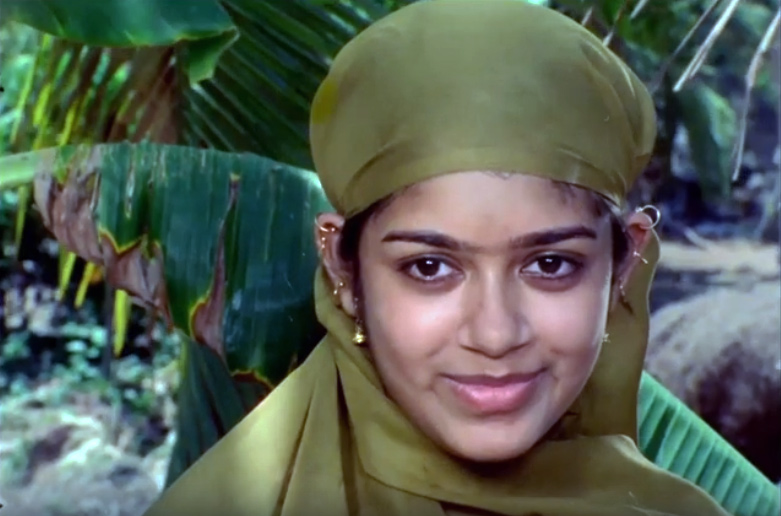
Chaya Singh

- Chandrakala
- Chandrika
- Chaya Singh
- Catherine Tresa
- Chitkala Biradar

== D ==
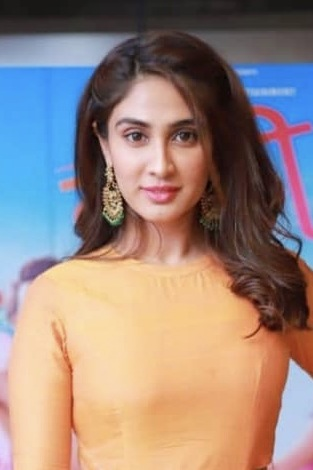
Deepti Sati

- Deepa
- Deepti Sati
- Disha Madan
- Deepa Sannidhi
- Divya Spandana
- Disha Poovaiah
- Dubbing Janaki
- Deepika Padukone

== E ==
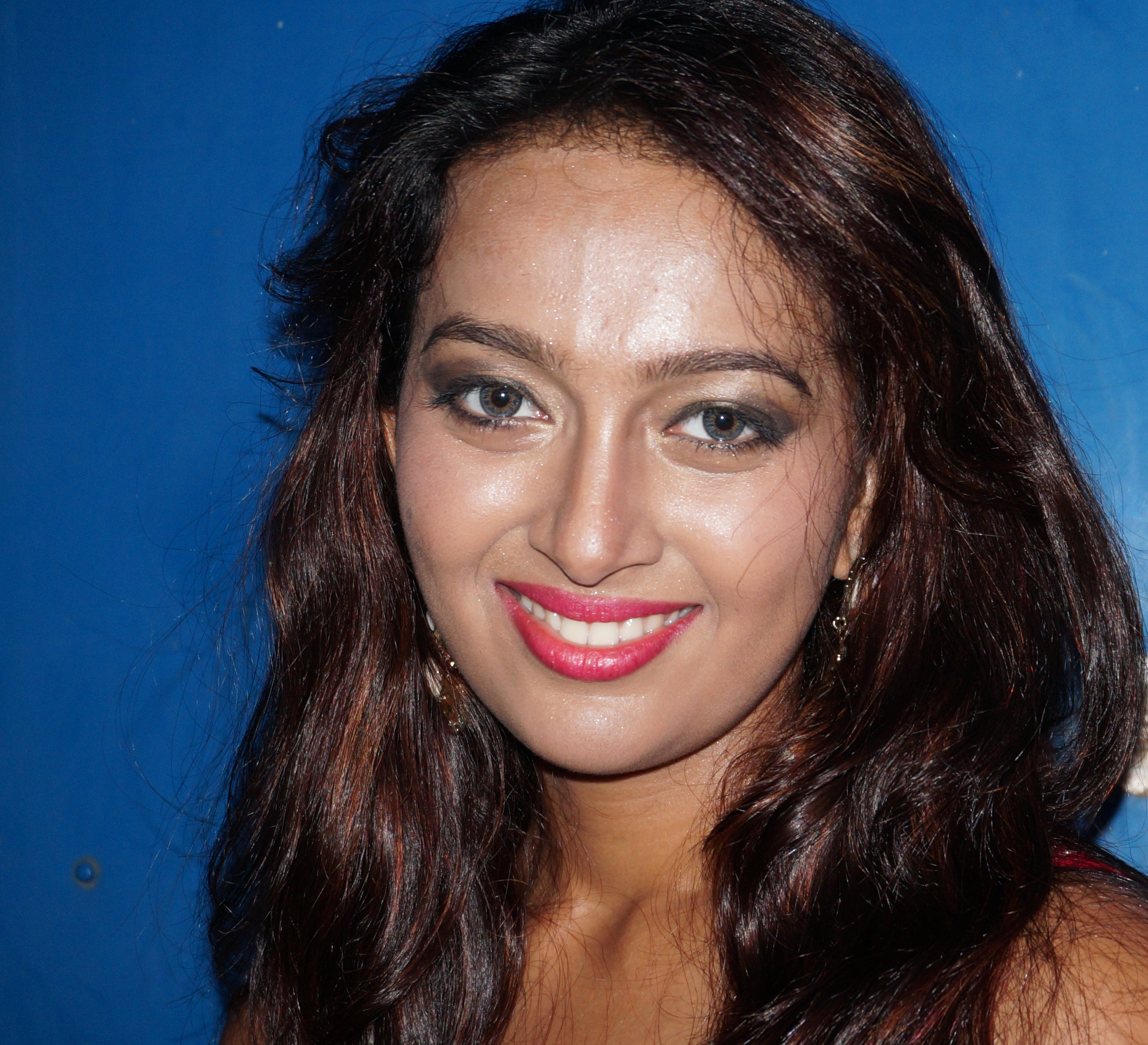
Ester Noronha

- Erica Fernandes

== G ==
- Gautami
- Gayatri
- Geetha
- Gayathiri Iyer
- Genelia D'Souza
- Gayatri Jayaraman

== H ==
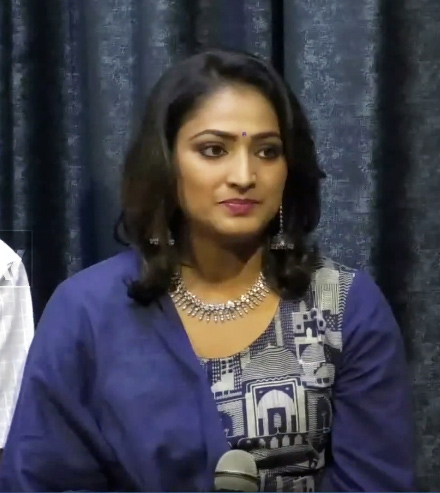
Hariprriya

- Harini
- Hariprriya
- Hema Choudhary
- Hebah Patel
- Harshika Poonacha

== I ==
- Indira Devi
- Isha Koppikar

== J ==
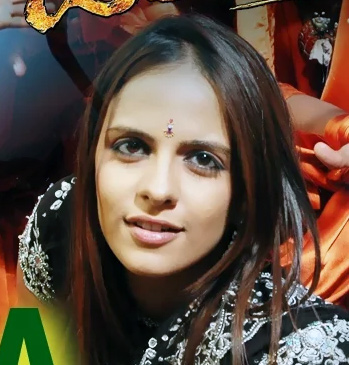
Jennifer Kotwal

- J. Jayalalithaa
- Juhi Chawla
- Jayamala
- Jayamalini
- Jaya Pradha
- Jayanthi
- Jyotika
- Jennifer Kotwal

== K ==
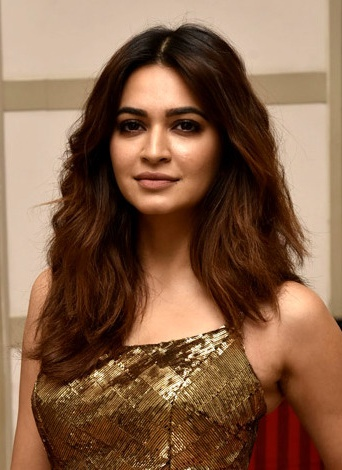
Kriti Kharbanda

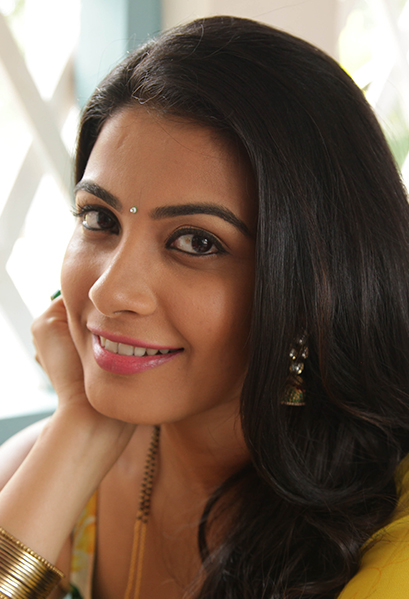
Kavya Shetty

- Kalpana
- Kanchana
- Karthika Nair
- Kaveri
- Kausalya
- Kriti Kharbanda
- Krishna Kumari
- Kumari Padmini
- Kusalakumari
- Kavitha Gowda
- Kutty Padmini
- Kushee Ravi
- Kavya Shetty
- Karunya Ram
- Kruttika Ravindra
- Kristina Akheeva
- Kiara Advani

== L ==
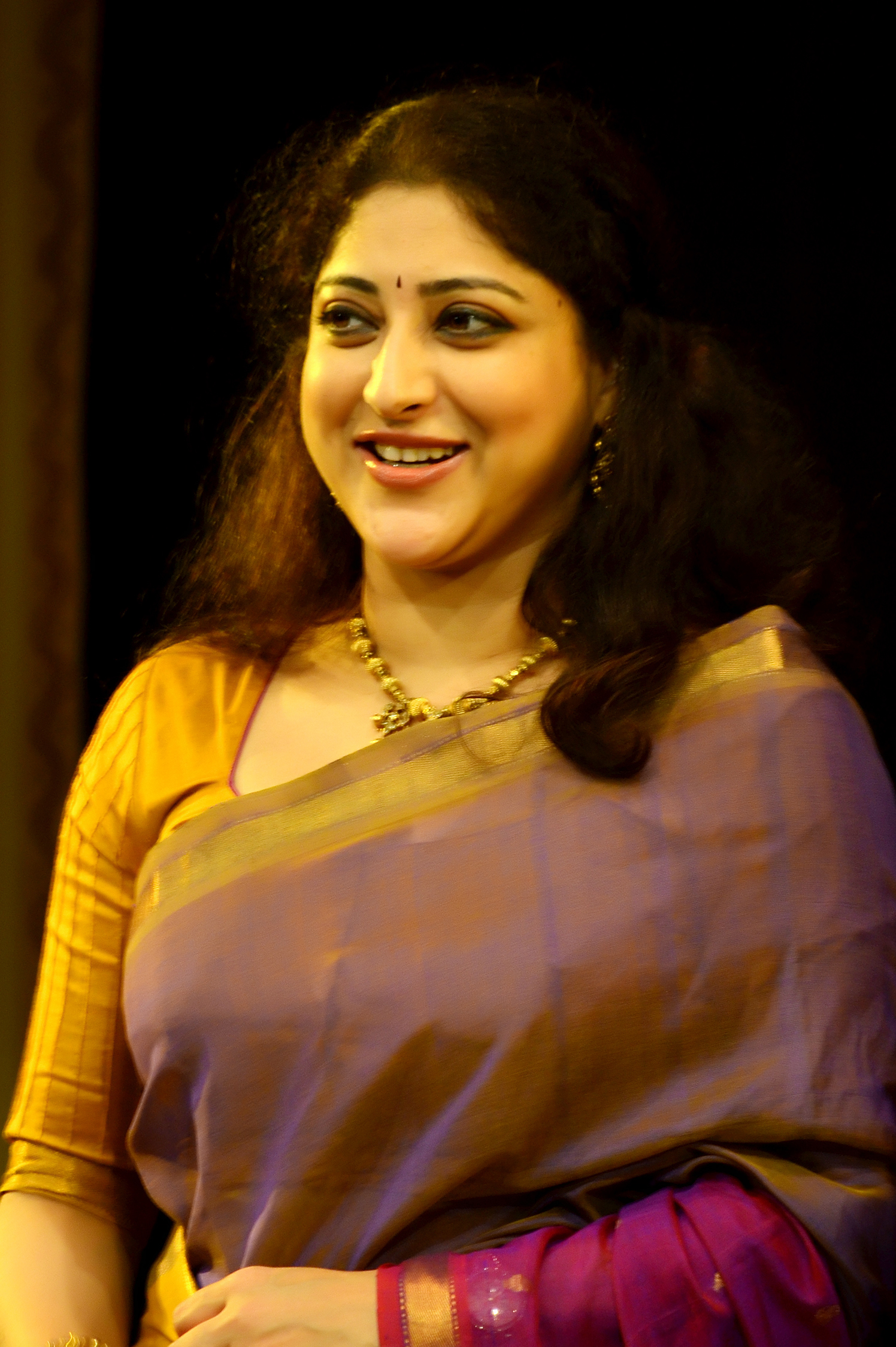
Lakshmi Gopalaswamy

- Laila
- Lakshmi
- Lakshmidevi
- Leelavathi
- Lakshmi Gopalaswamy

== M ==
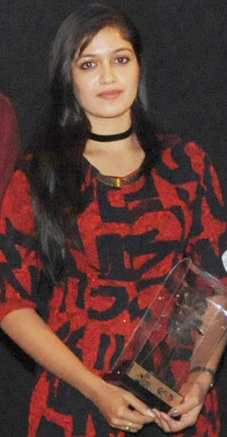
Meghana Raj

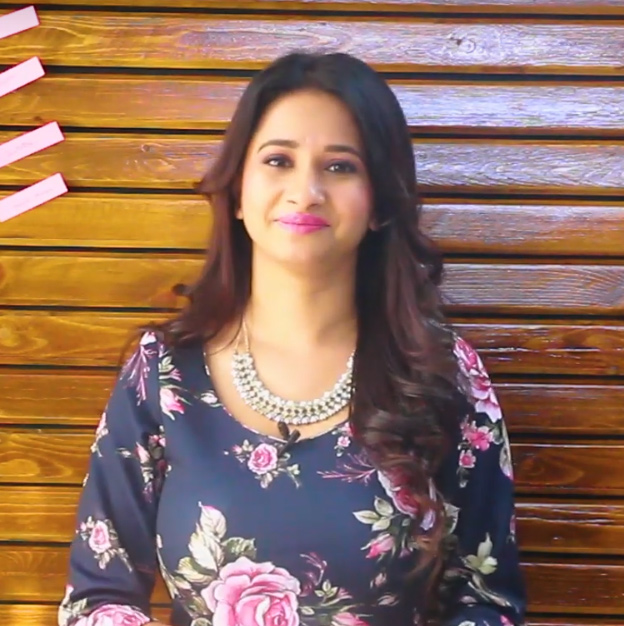
Manvita Kamath

- Meena
- Madhoo
- Madhavi
- Manjula
- Meghashree
- Malashri
- Mayuri Kyatari
- Manorama
- Manvitha Kamath
- Mahalakshmi
- Madhuri Itagi
- Meera Jasmine
- Milana Nagaraj
- Meghana Raj
- Moon Moon Sen
- Meenakshi Dixit
- Meghana Gaonkar

== N ==
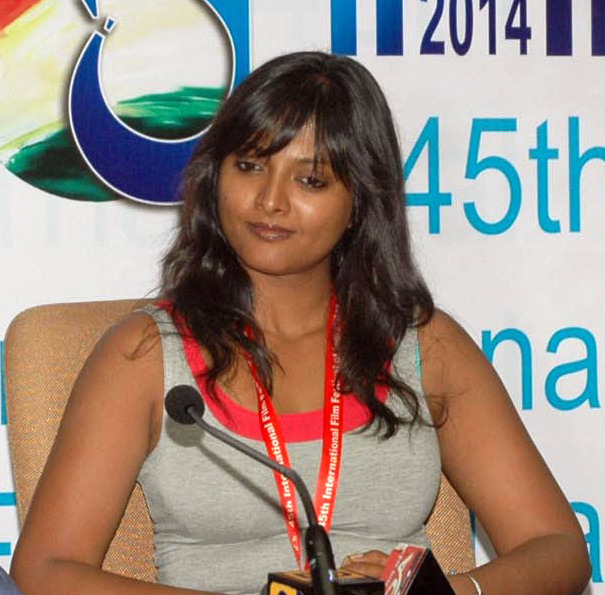
Nivedhitha

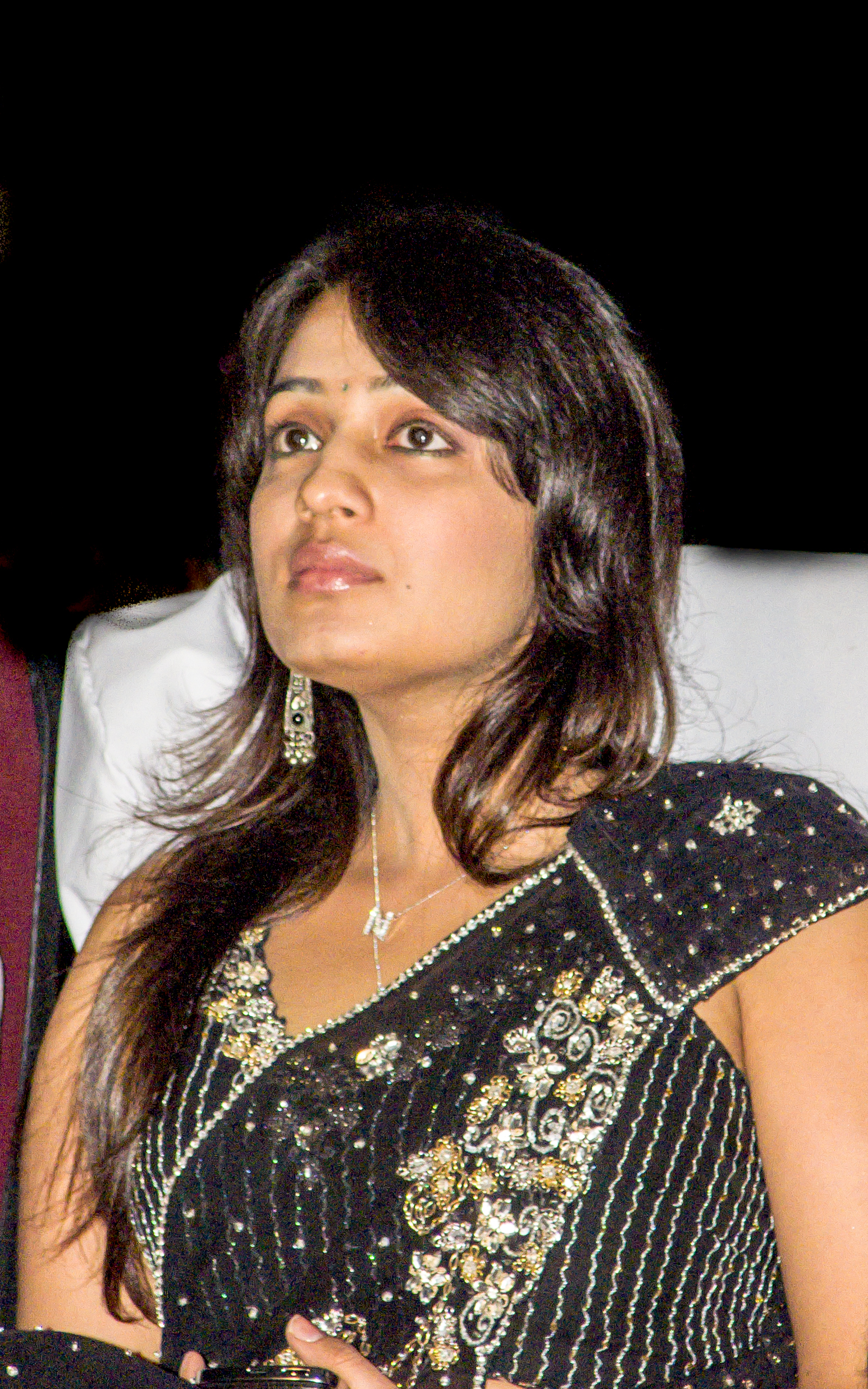
Nikita Thukral

- Nalini
- Nagma
- Namitha
- Nayanthara
- Neethu
- Navya Nair
- Nivedhitha
- Nabha Natesh
- Nithya Menon
- Nikki Galrani
- Nithya Ram
- Neha Shetty
- Nikesha Patel
- Nishvika Naidu
- Nikita Thukral
- Nidhi Subbaiah
- Nisha Ravikrishnan

== O ==
- Oviya

== P ==
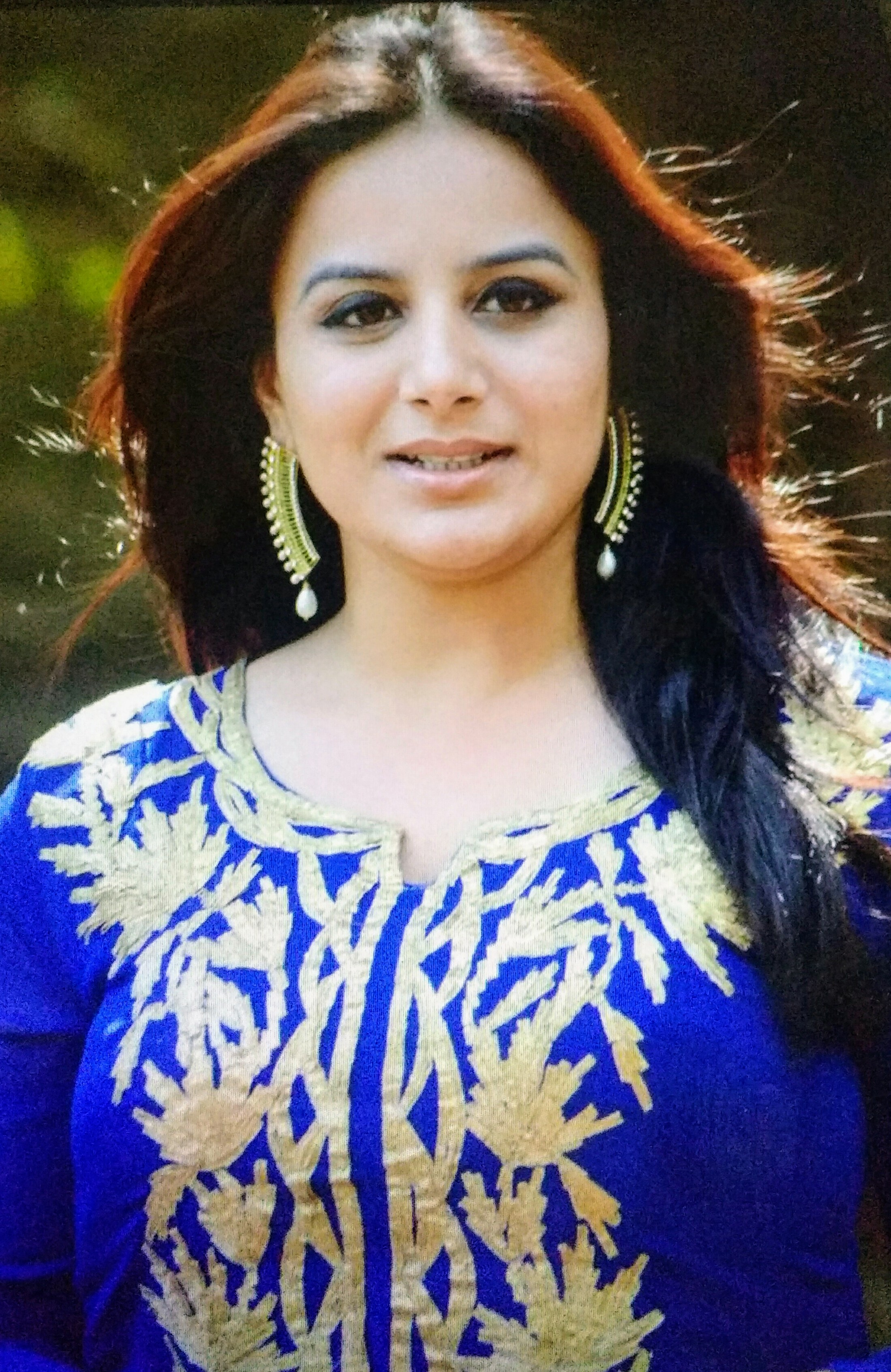
Pooja Gandhi

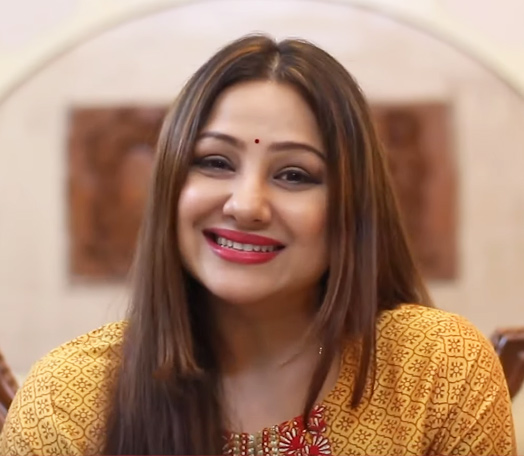
Priyanka Upendra

- Poorna
- Padmavati Rao
- Pandari Bai
- Parvathy
- Pooja Gandhi
- Pramila Joshai
- Prema
- Prathima Devi
- Pranitha Subhash
- Priyanka Thimmesh
- Priya Anand
- Priyamani
- Parul Yadav
- Priya Tendulkar
- Pavitra Lokesh
- Priyanka Upendra
- Priyanka Kothari

== R ==
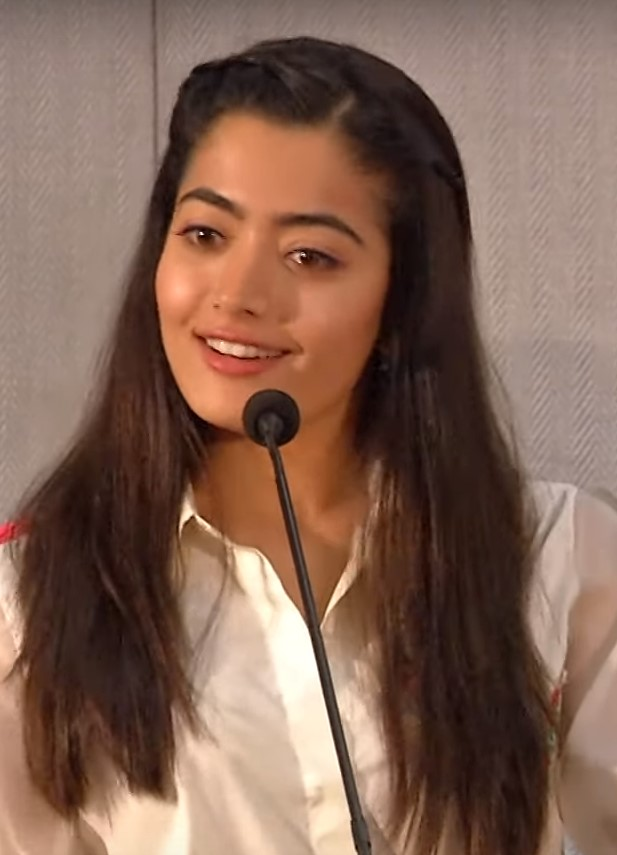
Rashmika Mandanna

- Radha
- Rekha
- Rashmi
- Rachita Ram
- Ranya Rao
- Radhika
- Rachel David
- Roopadevi
- Raai Laxmi
- Radhika Pandit
- Ragini Dwivedi
- Rashmi Prabhakar
- Rajani
- Ramya Krishna
- Ranjani Raghavan
- Rashmika Mandanna
- Rukmini Vasanth
- Rajasulochana
- Rekha
- Rachana Inder
- Roshni Prakash
- Rekha Vedavyas
- Raveena Tandon
- Reeshma Nanaiah
- Rishika Singh
- Roja Ramani
- Ramya Barna
- Radhika Narayan
- Rajshri Ponnappa
- Renukamma Murugodu
- Rakul Preet Singh
- Reba Monica John
- Roja Selvamani

== S ==
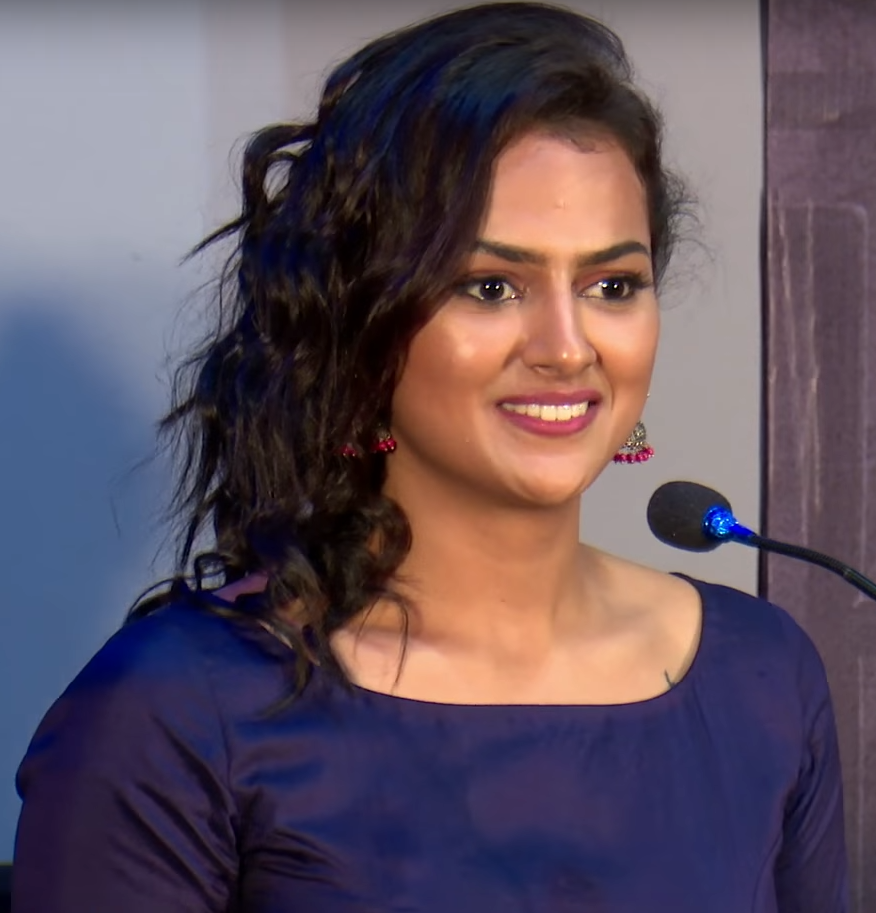
Shraddha Srinath

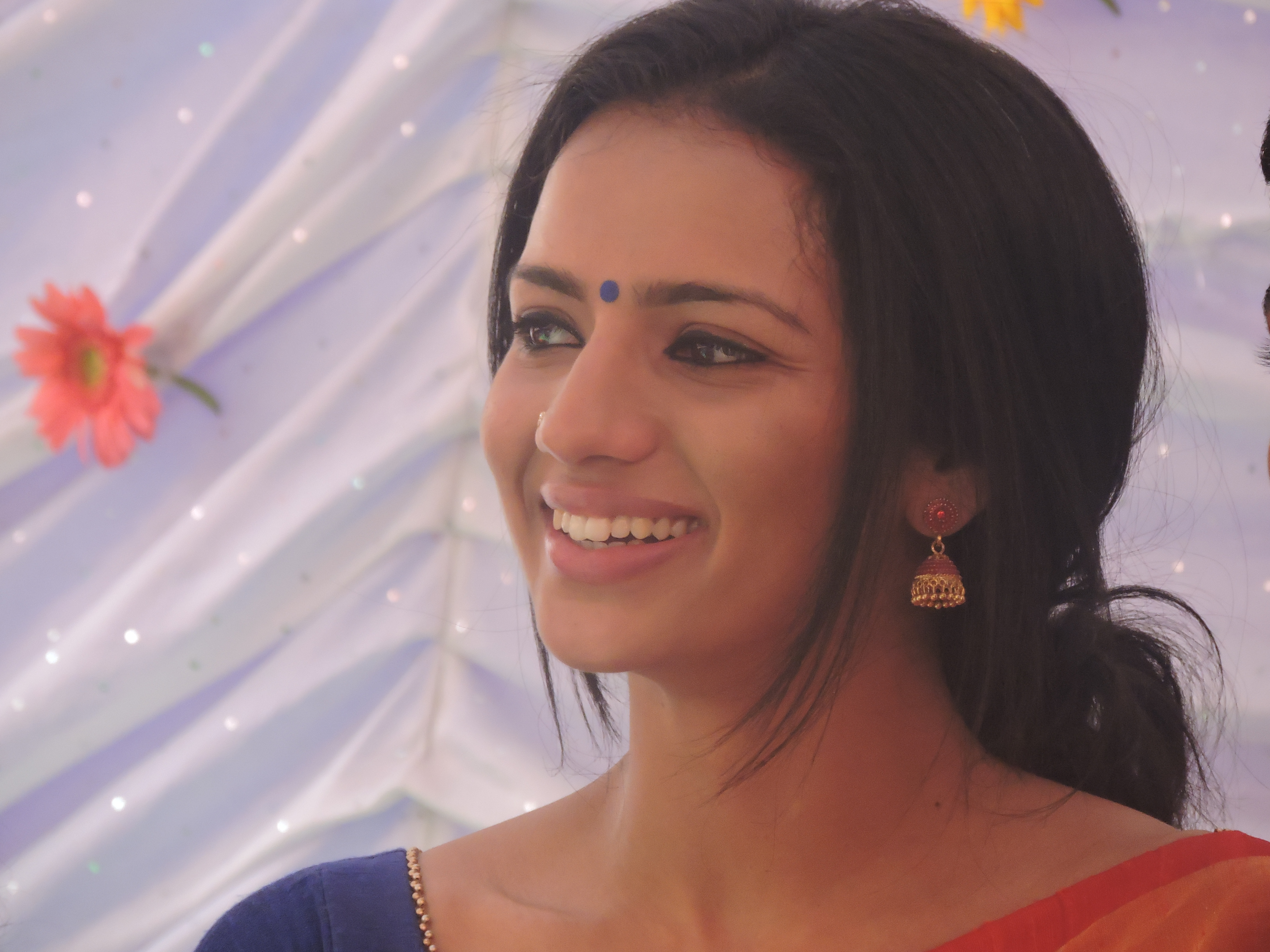
Sruthi Hariharan

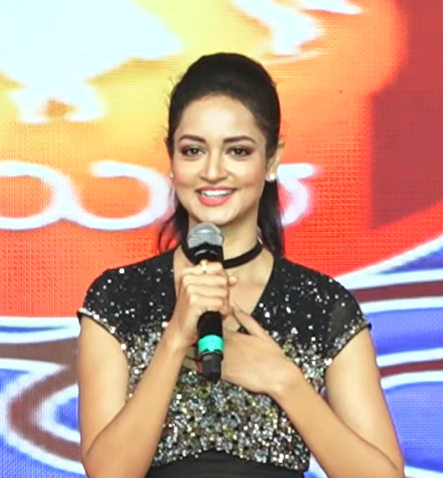
Shanvi Srivastava

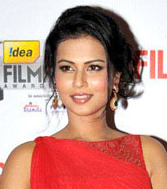
Sharmiela Mandre

- Sanghavi
- Saroja Devi
- Satyabhama
- Savitri
- Sithara
- Shilpa
- Sadha
- Sonali Bendre
- Shilpa Shetty
- Shobha
- Sayyeshaa
- Shobhana
- Shwetha
- Sherin
- Sanjana Anand
- Sushma Raj
- Samyuktha Hegde
- Shubha
- Sharmiela Mandre
- Suhasini Maniratnam
- Sudha Chandran
- Sukanya
- Shruti
- Suman Ranganathan
- Sumithra
- Sonu Gowda
- Sridevi
- Soundarya
- Sripriya
- Sanjjanaa
- Sudharani
- Sreeleela
- Sameera Reddy
- Sowcar Janaki
- Shraddha Das
- Shriya Saran
- Sanjana Anand
- Sindhu Tolani
- Shubha Poonja
- Sai Dhanshika
- Sonal Monteiro
- Sapthami Gowda
- Sangeetha Bhat
- Sudha Belawadi
- Sindhu Lokanath
- Samyukta Hornad
- Srinidhi Shetty
- Shraddha Srinath
- Sruthi Hariharan
- Sangeita Chauhan
- Shanvi Srivastava
- Sanchita Padukone
- Shwetha Srivatsav
- Sangeetha Sringeri

== T ==
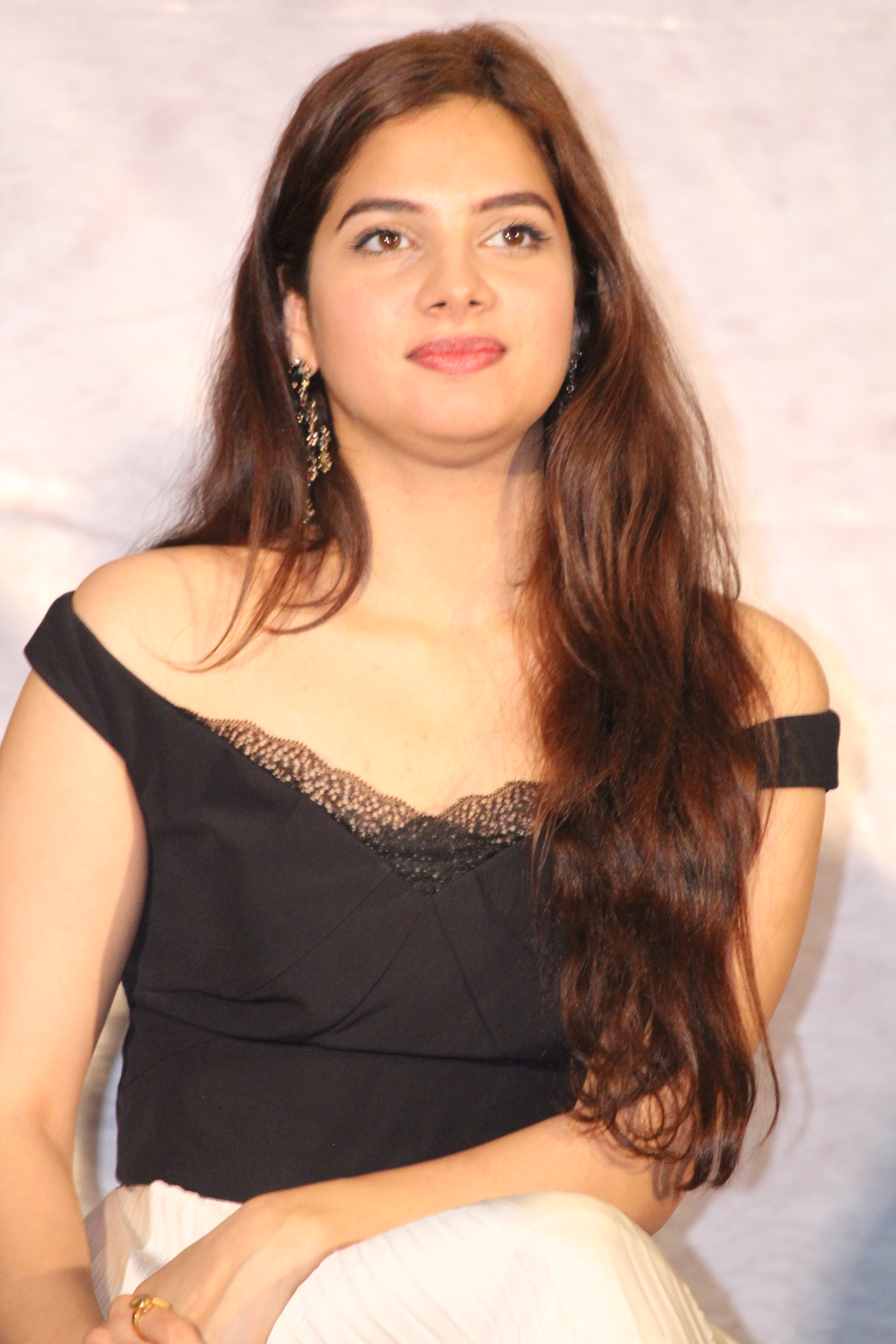
Tanya Hope

- Tara
- Tulasi
- Tripuramba
- Tanya Hope
- Tulip Joshi

== U ==
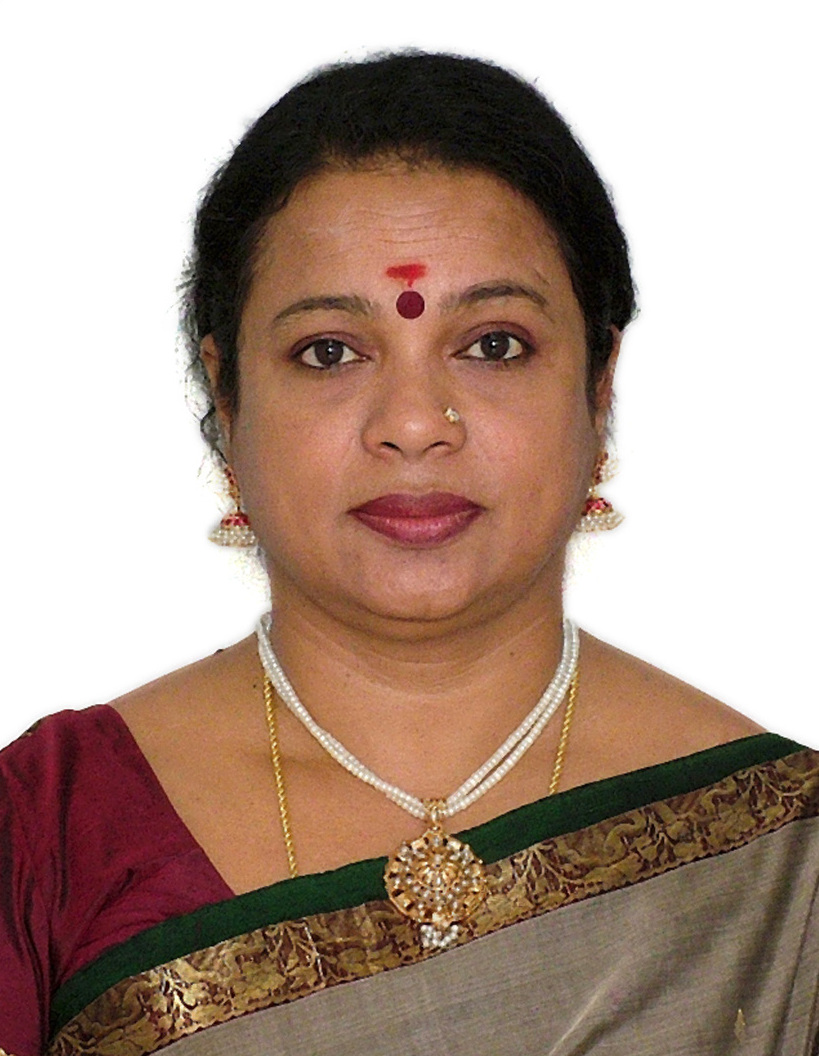
Umashree

- Umashree
- Urvashi
- Urvashi Rautela

== V ==
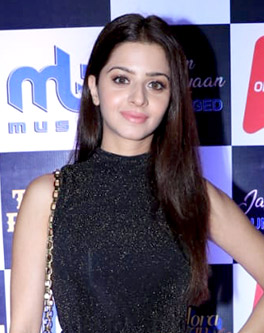
Vedhika

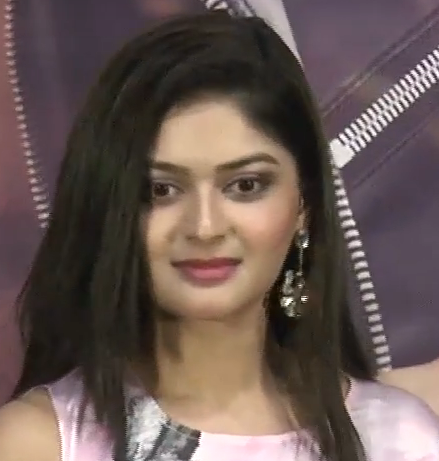
Vaibhavi Shandilya

- Vedhika
- Vijayalakshmi
- Vanitha Vasu
- Veena Sundar
- Vijayalalitha
- Vijayashanti
- Vinaya Prasad
- Varsha Bollamma
- Vaishnavi Gowda
- Vaibhavi Shandilya
- Vijayalakshmi Singh
- Vaishali Kasaravalli
- Varalaxmi Sarathkumar

== Y ==
- Yamuna
- Yagna Shetty

== Other notable ==
Many actresses have made their debut with Kannada films or debuted in lead role with Kannada films or have played their first credited role in Kannada films and later went onto work in Hindi, Telugu and Tamil cinema. These include: J. Jayalalithaa with Shri Shaila Mahathme (1961), Lakshmi with Goa Dalli CID 999 (1968), Rekha with Operation Jackpot Nalli C.I.D 999 (1969), Shubha with Naagarahaavu (1972), Aishwariyaa Bhaskaran with Hosa Kavya (1989), Suman Ranganathan with C.B.I. Shankar (1989), Soundarya with Baa Nanna Preethisu (1992) and Gandharva (1992), Rajeshwari with Gandhada Gudi Part 2 (1994), Monal Naval with Indradhanush (2000), Gayatri Jayaraman with Neela (2001), Bhavna Pani with Yuvaraja (2001), Deepika Padukone with Aishwarya (2006), Nithya Menen with 7 O' Clock (2006), Surveen Chawla with Paramesha Panwala (2008), Rakul Preet Singh with Gilli (2009), Catherine Tresa with Shankar IPS (2010), Yami Gautam with Ullasa Utsaha (2010), Reema Worah with Gubbi (2010), Gayathiri Iyer with Shravana (2011), Karishma Tanna with I Am Sorry Mathe Banni Preethsona (2011), Daisy Shah with Bhadra (2011), Sakshi Agarwal with Software Ganda (2014), Shraddha Srinath with U Turn (2016), Rukshar Dhillon with Run Antony (2016), Rashmika Mandanna with Kirik Party (2016), Rukmini Vasanth with Birbal Trilogy Case 1 (2019), Priyanka Arul Mohan with Ondh Kathe Hella (2019), Sreeleela with Kiss (2019) and Kayadu Lohar with Mugilpete (2021).

== See also ==
- Kannada cinema
- List of Indian film actresses
- List of Hindi film actresses
- List of Tamil film actresses
- List of Telugu film actresses
