= Murari (2015 film) =

Indian action drama film

- Official poster
- Directed by: H. Vasu
- Written by: R. S. Gowda
- Produced by: Kumar Gowda; R. S. Gowda
- Starring: Sriimurali; Rashmi; Madhuri Itagi; Sharath Lohitashwa
- Cinematography: Cinetech Soori
- Edited by: M. S. Raj
- Music by: V. Manohar
- Release date: 22 May 2015
- Country: India
- Language: Kannada

Murari is a 2015 Indian Kannada-language action drama film directed by H. Vasu and starring Sriimurali, Rashmi, Madhuri Itagi and Sharath Lohitashwa.

== Cast ==
- Sriimurali as Murari
- Rashmi as Kavya
- Madhuri Itagi
- Sharath Lohitashwa as police officer
- Prasanna
- Sathish Ninasam as Kavya's lover

== Production ==
The film was launched in 2008 but did not release for unknown reasons. After Sriimurali found success with Ugramm (2014) after consecutive flops, the makers decided to release the film to cash in on the film's success. The film was initially scheduled to release on 25 July 2014. The film was later scheduled to release on 1 May 2015 before being postponed to 22 May 2015.

== Soundtrack ==
The music was composed by V. Manohar, who also penned the lyrics.

Track listing
No.	Title	Singer(s)	Length
1.	"Aana Jaana Gaana Bhajana"	Rajesh Krishnan	4:23
2.	"Yedeyolege Hrudayave Illa"	Rajesh Krishnan, Nanditha	4:59
3.	"Navile Nallidaade"	Nanditha	2:43
4.	"Ee Premigande Banda"	Vinyachandra, Anuradha Bhat	5:02
5.	"Baaduva Lathege"	Vinaychandra	4:18
Total length:			21:25

== Reception ==
A critic from Bangalore Mirror wrote that "Overall Murari is not the worst film of Sri Murali but it has absolutely nothing special". A critic from The Times of India opined that the film has "A hackneyed plot that has come a few years too late".
