= Ouija (2015 film) =

- Theatrical release poster
- Directed by: Raaj Kumar Reddy
- Produced by: Vikram Raju
- Starring: Bharat; Shraddha Das; Gayathri Iyer; Madhuri Itagi; Kadambari Jethwani; Sayaji Shinde; Avinash; Raja Ravindra
- Cinematography: V Ravi Kumar
- Edited by: S. R. Sekhar
- Music by: Hari Nikesh
- Production company: Vega Entertainment
- Release date: 2015
- Country: India
- Language: Kannada

Ouija (also known as Ouija: Game Never Ends) is a 2015 Kannada-language supernatural horror film produced by Vikram Raju under the Vega Entertainment banner. The movie is directed by Raaj Kumar Reddy. The film stars Bharath, Shraddha Das, Gayathri Iyer, Madhuri Itagi, Kadambari Jethwani, Sayaji Shinde, Avinash, Raja Ravindra and Raghu Kunche. The films' music has been composed by Hari Nikesh. The stunt sequences in the film were directed by action director William Ong. All five songs for the film have been choreographed by Raghu Master. The major portion of this film was shot in Malaysia and Bangalore with a few scenes being shot in Hyderabad. The film was dubbed in Telugu as Aata. Ouija was released in India on 6 November 2015.

== Cast ==
- Bharat as Bala Raju
- Shraddha Das as Maaya
- Gayathri Iyer as Kshetra
- Madhuri Itagi as Krishna
- Kadambari Jethwani as Niharika
- Avinash as Iliyas
- Sayaji Shinde as Santan Fakhir
- Raja Ravindra as KK
- Raghu Kunche as Dheeraj
- Ganesh Shankar as Sridhar
- Naveen Krishna
- Ajay Raj

== Soundtrack ==
Track listing
No.	Title	Lyrics	Artist(s)	Length
1.	"Nam Sexy Looksu.."	Naveen Krishna	Nikhita Gandhi	04:01
2.	"Na Nano Car..."	Naveen Krishna	Deepak, Sharmila	03:07
3.	"I'm A Poison Lady.."	Naveen Krishna	Sharmila	04:05
4.	"Lets Start The Game.."	Naveen Krishna	Ujjayinee Ray	04:26
5.	"Boom Boom Boom"	Naveen Krishna	Sharmila	03:17
Total length:				18:03
