= Etharkkum Thunindhavan =

2022 film directed by Pandiraj

- Theatrical release poster
- Directed by: Pandiraj
- Written by: Pandiraj
- Produced by: Kalanithi Maran
- Starring: Suriya; Vinay Rai; Priyanka Mohan
- Cinematography: R. Rathnavelu
- Edited by: Ruben
- Music by: D. Imman
- Production company: Sun Pictures
- Distributed by: Red Giant Movies
- Release date: 10 March 2022
- Running time: 150 minutes
- Country: India
- Language: Tamil
- Budget: ₹75 crore
- Box office: est. ₹71.4–200 crore (Note: According to Hindustan Times, Etharkkum Thunindhavan grossed ₹71.40 crore worldwide. The Telegraph stated that the film grossed ₹200 crore worldwide in its lifetime.)

Etharkkum Thunindhavan (transl. Daredevil for Anything), also known by the initialism ET, is a 2022 Indian Tamil-language action thriller film, written and directed by Pandiraj, and produced by Sun Pictures. The film stars Suriya, Vinay Rai and Priyanka Mohan. D. Imman composed the film's music, R. Rathnavelu handled the cinematography and Ruben edited it. The film revolves around a lawyer, who becomes a ruthless executioner, who opposes a pornography racket that is run by a prominent minister's son.

The project was officially announced in October 2020 under the title Suriya 40. It is the production company's first venture with Suriya; they had distributed Suriya's films Ayan (2009) and Singam (2010). Filming began on 15 February 2021 and was completed by mid-November, despite filming being delayed for a three-month period due to COVID-19 lockdown restrictions. It was primarily filmed in Chennai, Madurai, Karaikudi and Courtallam, and a song sequence was filmed in Goa.

Etharkkum Thunindhavan was released in theatres worldwide on 10 March 2022. It received mixed reviews from critics and grossed ₹71.4–200 crore worldwide.

== Plot ==
Kannabiran is a lawyer at Madras High Court who lives in Thennaadu with his father, Aadhirayar, and mother, Kosalai. The neighbouring village is Vadanaadu. Residents of both villages believe the god Shiva and the goddess Shakti originated in these villages, and they hold a grand festival celebrating their togetherness. Women in Thennaadu are married to men in Vadanaadu, and vice versa. Following the suicide of a woman from Thennaadu who has married a man from Vadanaadu, both villages engage in rivalry.

Kannabiran falls in love with and marries Aadhini from Vadanaadu. Aadhini's friend, Yazhnila, is in love with Nithin, who is Inba's henchman. Nithin asks Yazhnila to sleep with Inba's business associate. Yazhnila tries to escape from Nithin, but Inba's men chase and severely beat her. Kannabiran rescues Yazhnila and warns Inba and his men. Inba had earlier killed his pregnant wife and a girl named Monika. After Kannabiran and Aadhini's marriage, Kannabiran shelters Yazhnila and supports her in the fight against a pornography racket run by Inba.

When Kannabiran and Aadhini have sex, Inba secretly records a video of them and one of Aadhini bathing. The couple receives the video and is shocked. Despite this, Kannabiran is resolute and asks Aadhini to stay strong and fight with him. Kannabiran gathers evidence from the victims of Inba's racket and files a petition against him and his men. Inba's advocate produces false evidence showing him as a philanthropist and educationalist. Also, Inba discovers where Kannabiran kidnapped Nithin, kills him and puts his dead body in the trunk of Kannabiran's car. As a result, the judge dismisses the case and orders Kannabiran and Aadhirayar's imprisonment. After serving two months in jail, Aadhirayar inspires Kannabiran to become an executioner and to abandon his early faith in the rule of law to carry out justice.

Kannabiran accepts Aadhirayar's suggestion. He kidnaps all of Inba's henchmen and locks them inside a factory. After a deadly and intense chase between Kannabiran and Inba, Kannabiran gains access to and destroys the computer systems Inba and his men use for creating pornographic content. Kannabiran beats Inba's men and lectures their parents on men respecting women and their privacy. Kannabiran proves that Inba and his men have intimate recordings of 500 women belonging to their village and are committed to spoiling the lives of those women by not allowing them to be married and ruining their dignity in society. Kannabiran recollects his past; when he was nine, two men kidnapped, assaulted and killed his younger sister.

The relatives of Inba's henchmen are now ashamed of them and kill them for their actions. Inba's father-in-law kills Inba because the latter killed the former's daughter and circulated rumours about her murder. Kannabiran surrenders himself to the police and falsely confesses to the murders. Kosalai chastises him for becoming a ruthless murderer even after witnessing his family's struggles while the police take Kannabiran away. Kannabiran reminds Kosalai that he did not commit the murders but simply removed weeds that were harmful to society.

== Cast ==
- Suriya as Adv. A. R. Kannabiran
- Vinay Rai as Inbasekharan (Inba)
- Priyanka Mohan as Aadhini Kannabiran
- Sathyaraj as Aadhirayar
- Saranya Ponvannan as Kosalai
- Ilavarasu as Aadhini's father
- Devadarshini as Anjumani
- M. S. Bhaskar as Karuppaiya
- Soori as Aavani Soolamani
- Madhusudhan Rao as Inba's father, the Central Minister
- Hareesh Peradi as Inba's father-in-law
- Jayaprakash as SP Thiraviya Pandian
- Vela Ramamoorthy as Kaverinandan
- Pugazh as Soolamani's sidekick
- Sai Dheena as Police Inspector Moses Michael Faraday
- Subbu Panchu as Prof. Alagunambi
- Saran Shakthi as Nithin
- Ciby Bhuvana Chandran as Aaron
- Dhivya Duraisamy as Yazhnila
- K. P. Jagan
- Ramar as Kannabiran's junior
- Tiger Thangadurai as Kannabiran's junior
- Viji Chandrasekhar as Judge
- R. N. R. Manohar as Aaron's father
- Supergood Subramani as Yazhnila's father
- Akash Premkumar as Inba's henchman
- Vignesh Shanmugam as Inba's henchman
- Poster Nandakumar as Lawyer
- Manoj Kumar

== Production ==
=== Development ===
In May 2019, Suriya was reported to be working on a project backed by Sun Pictures; it would be his third collaboration with the company after Ayan (2009) and Singam (2010). Hari, who had previously worked with Suriya in Aaru (2005), Vel (2007) and the Singam franchise, was speculated to be the project's director but he exited the project without revealing the reasons. Suriya and Hari later collaborated on a film titled Aruvaa, which was produced by Studio Green, but this project was also shelved and Suriya worked on a film with Pandiraj instead of a project with either Adanga Maru director Karthik Thangavel or a Telugu director. Pandiraj had earlier worked with Suriya, whose production company 2D Entertainment had backed his projects Pasanga 2, in which Suriya played a supporting character, and Karthi's Kadaikutty Singam.

=== Pre-production ===
On 25 October 2020, the festival Dusshera, Sun Pictures confirmed the project under the title Suriya 40, which would be Suriya's 40th film as a lead actor; it also marked Pandiraj's second film with the production house after their collaboration with Namma Veettu Pillai. Unlike Pandiraj's earlier films, which are based on family emotions and sentiments, such as Kadaikutty Singam and Namma Veettu Pillai, this new project would be an action film with space for commercial elements. This would be Pandiraj's second action-based film after Kathakali. Pandiraj wrote the story, which is based on the 2019 Pollachi sexual assault case. The film's title Etharkkum Thunindhavan was officially announced on 22 July 2021; the title references an identically titled 1976 film in which Suriya's father Sivakumar played the lead role.

=== Casting ===
In November 2020, Rashmika Mandanna was reported to be playing the female lead but Pandiraj refuted rumours about the casting process. In January 2021, the production house announced D. Imman would compose the film's music following collaborations with Pandiraj in Kadaikkutty Singam and Namma Veettu Pillai. Etharkkum Thunindhavan is Imman's first collaboration with Suriya. The same month, Priyanka Mohan was announced as the female lead; it is her second Tamil film following Doctor (2021). Her character was announced as Aadhini, Suriya's love interest in the film. Sathyaraj too joined the film in a supporting role. Rajkiran, who had worked with Suriya in Nandhaa (2001), was announced as part of the film but he eventually did not feature. In February 2021, Soori was announced as a part of the cast; he plays Aadhini's uncle. In March 2021, Vinay Rai was announced as the film's antagonist. Saran Shakthi played a character with negative shades in the film. It was reported the film has 40 significant characters, including Jayaprakash, Saranya Ponvannan and Devadarshini. Director-actor K. P. Jagan announced he had been cast in Etharkkum Thunindhavan and joined the second schedule in early September 2021.

=== Filming ===
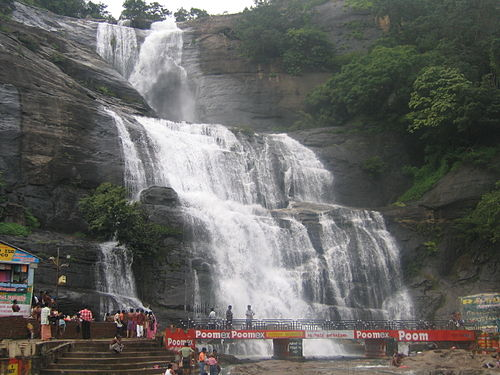
The final and brief schedule of the film was filmed in Courtallam

Etharkkum Thunindhavan was launched on 15 February 2021, with the principal cast and crew members—excluding Suriya, who had been diagnosed with COVID-19—in attendance. The makers filmed few scenes with the ensemble cast without Suriya. After recovering from COVID-19, Suriya joined filming on 18 March 2021. He shared an image from the film at Binny Mills, Chennai, on social media, confirming his presence. Following a 21-day schedule, the production went to Madurai to film major sequences in April that year. An action sequence with a huge crowd was planned to be filmed but due to restrictions imposed by the Government of Tamil Nadu during the second wave of COVID-19, the plan was abandoned in consideration for the safety of the crew members. By late April 2021, 35% of the filming had been completed before a COVID-19 lockdown was imposed.

Filming resumed on 12 July following the relaxations of the lockdown. The team filmed few scenes in Chennai instead of Karaikudi. During the filming schedule in Koyambedu, police detained Victor, an assistant to Pandiraj, and seized rifles and pistols used in the film, which were later found to be non-functional. Victor was detained because he did not have proper documents for licensing. In mid-July, the production moved to Karaikkudi for a 51-day schedule to film crucial sequences that was completed in September. The production then moved to Courtallam for the final, brief filming schedule in mid-September 2021.

At the end of September, it was reported two of the songs would be filmed in Chennai and Goa the following month, and upon completion, the team may conclude filming. Filming of one song which was directed by Jani Master, was delayed because it required a huge, star cast and included extensive dance steps, and the cast needed more time to prepare. With the completion of patchwork scenes, filming ended on 10 November 2021 and Pandiraj shared the news through social-media platform Twitter. After filming concluded, Suriya gifted gold coins worth ₹1 crore (US$100,000) to the actors and technicians who worked on the film.

=== Post-production ===
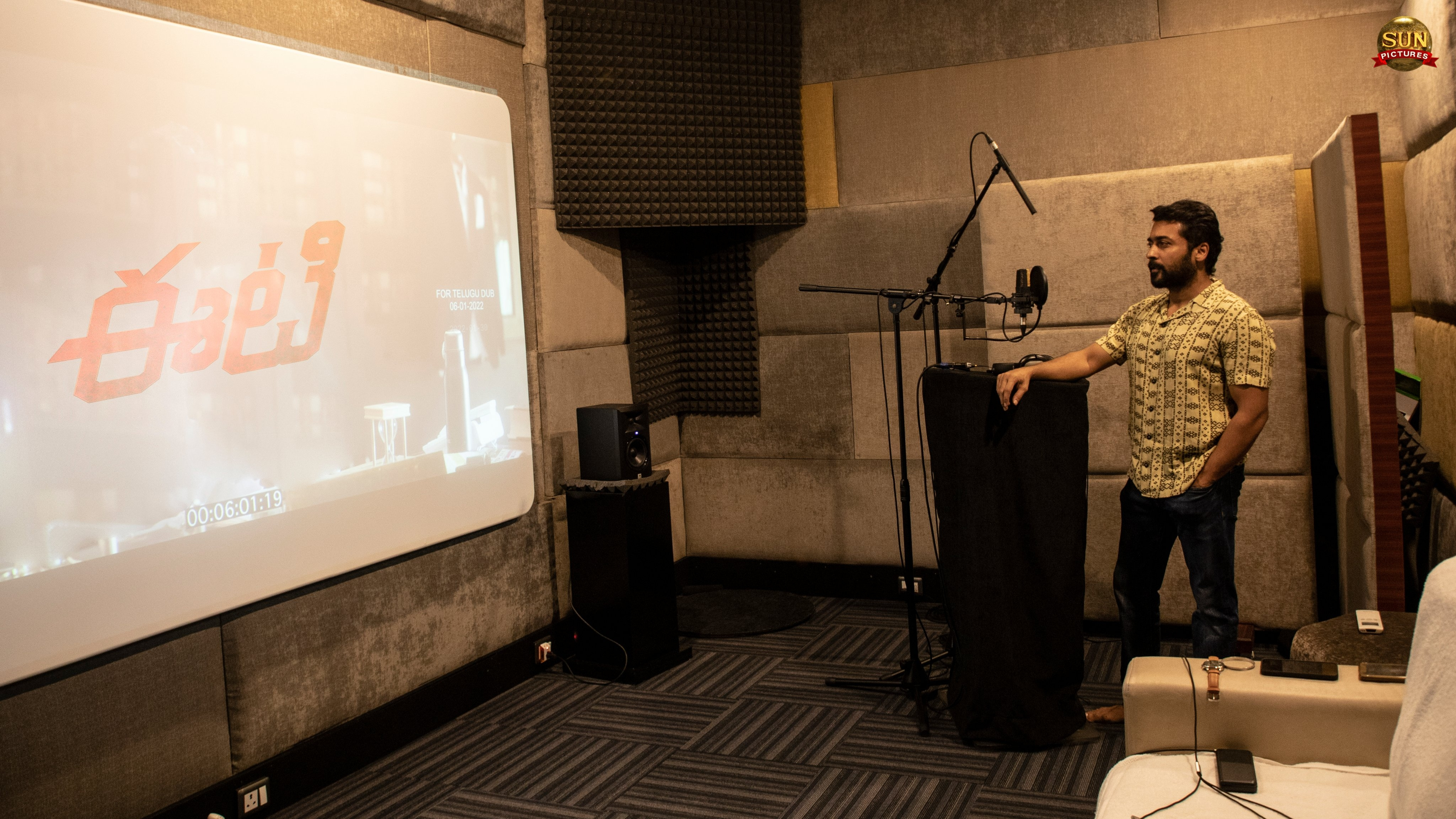
Suriya at the dubbing session of the Telugu version of Etharkkum Thunindhavan

Post-production work on Etharkkum Thunindhavan began in mid-November 2021. Suriya began dubbing for the film on 17 November. Vinay Rai completed dubbing for his role on 24 December that year. Post-production was completed by late December 2021, and the final copy was ready by January 2022. The film was submitted to the Central Board of Film Certification (CBFC), which gave it a U/A certificate. Several scenes featuring excessive violence were removed from the film. In February 2022, Sun Pictures released an image of Suriya, who provided a voiceover for the film's dubbed-Telugu version.

== Music ==
D. Imman composed the music for Etharkkum Thunindhavan; it is his third collaboration with Pandiraj following Kadaikutty Singam (2018) and Namma Veettu Pillai (2019). Imman was initially chosen for the film with Suriya, which Siva directed, and also for Aruvaa, which Hari directed. Those projects werenot produced so Etharkkum Thunindhavan is Immam's his first collaboration with Suriya. Yugabharathi and Vignesh Shivan were initially hired to write lyrics. In November 2021, actor Sivakarthikeyan was also announced as a lyricist for one of the film's songs.

Immam worked with a team of 100 musicians for film's soundtrack and background music. In early-December, reports G. V. Prakash Kumar would record the film's introductory track surfaced. Anirudh Ravichander was also chosen in to sing for a song of a different genre. Later, the producers announced both composers had recorded vocals for the track "Vaada Thambi", which Vignesh Shivan wrote. Carnatic musician Brinda Manickavasakan made her feature-film debut as a playback singer on the track "Ullam Urugudhaiya".

On 30 January 2022, a month before the film's release, the producers released Etharkkum Thunindhavan's theme music and original background score through YouTube. The tracks were released as the film's soundtrack album and the following day were separately released on music platforms. The soundtracks for the dubbed versions were released on 4 March 2022.

== Marketing ==
On 22 July 2021, the producers of Etharkkum Thunindhavan unveiled a first-look poster for the film, coinciding with the eve of Suriya's 46th birthday. The teaser of the film was released on 18 February 2022. Both the first look as well as the teaser received a positive feedback from the audience. The teaser garnered over four million views and over seven lakh likes on YouTube within a day of its release.

The film's trailer was released on 2 March 2022. The trailer was released in Tamil, Telugu, Hindi, Malayalam and Kannada languages, and received crossed over five million views in 24 hours. To launch the trailer, pre-release events were held in Tamil Nadu (Tamil), Hyderabad (Telugu) and Kerala (Malayalam). On 2 March a pre-release event was held in Chennai with all of the cast and crew participating.

To promote the film's Telugu version, Shreyas Media held a pre-release event on 3 March at Daspalla Convention City in Hyderabad. The film's cast and crew, as well as Telugu actors-and-directors Rana Daggubati and Gopichand Malineni, and director Boyapati Srinu, attended the event as chief guests. The third pre-release event was held in Kochi, Kerala, to promote the film's Malayalam version.

== Release ==
=== Theatrical ===
Etharkkum Thunindhavan was initially scheduled for theatrical release on 24 December 2021, during the Christmas weekend. In mid-October, reports that its release would be advanced to 17 December appeared. Because Sun Pictures' other production Beast (2022), which was originally scheduled to release on Pongal (14 January 2022), had been postponed to April 2022 due to production delays, the makers planned for a release on that festival as difficulties in post-production meant that the film would not be completed before Christmas. On 19 November 2021, it was announced that Etharkkum Thunindhavan would be theatrically released on 4 February 2022. The release of the film was postponed from that date due to an increase in COVID-19 cases.

Etharkkum Thunindhavan was released in theatres on 10 March 2022. The film was released in Tamil along with dubbed versions in Telugu, Malayalam, Hindi, and Kannada. This was Suriya's first theatrical release in three years, as his previous films Soorarai Pottru (2020) and Jai Bhim (2021) were assigned direct-to-streaming releases via Amazon Prime Video.

=== Distribution ===
Udhayanidhi Stalin of Red Giant Movies acquired the film's distribution rights in Tamil Nadu. Asian Multiplexes acquired the distribution rights for Andhra Pradesh and Telangana states. UFO Moviez acquired the distribution rights for North India.

=== Home media ===
Sun TV acquired the film's satellite rights, while the digital rights were acquired jointly by Sun NXT and Netflix. Etharkkum Thunindhavan began streaming on both Sun NXT and Netflix from 7 April 2022.

== Reception ==
=== Box office ===
According to The Times of India, prior to its release, Etharkkum Thunindhavan garnered about ₹3.8 crore (US$390,000) in Tamil Nadu and ₹5.50 lakh (US$5,700) in North India in advance bookings for the opening day.

Etharkkum Thunindhavan grossed around ₹9–10 crore in Tamil Nadu on its opening day. It reached ₹100 crore worldwide on its fifth day and grossed ₹71.40–200 crore in its lifetime, becoming one of the highest-grossing Tamil films of the year.

=== Critical response ===
Etharkkum Thunindhavan received mixed reviews from critics. M. Suganth of The Times of India gave the film 3 stars out of 5, stating: "what elevates this generic masala movie is its progressive outlook. It is definitely a good thing to see a star vehicle that sends out the right message, especially when it comes to women empowerment".

Ashameera Aiyappan of Firstpost also gave the film 3 out of 5, stating is "careful to not paint an idealistic, utopian dream. It acknowledges the deep personal trauma women face in such situations, the cruel judgements they are subjected to, and also how legal justice is almost inaccessible to most victims."

According to Srinivasan Ramanujam of The Hindu:

The combination of Sathyaraj and Suriya, for the first time on the big screen, is charming no doubt, but there's little that comes out of those sequences. While Saranya breezes through the mother's role, Priyanka Mohan gets just one solid sequence. Vinay, who impressed in Sivakarthikeyan's Doctor, gets another similar role but doesn't have much to do beyond appearing on screen with villainous laughs. The final face-off has little sparkle. The comedy has little flavour. And the edit seems to have been done in a tearing hurry.

Haricharan Pudipeddi of Hindustan Times praised the film, saying: "Suriya holds the film together with a very strong performance. If Jai Bhim saw Suriya deliver a restrained performance, he goes all out to in Etharkkum Thunindhavan to pander to the masses." Sowmya Rajendran of The News Minute stated: "Etharkkum Thunindhavan means the daredevil who is ready for anything. Is Suriya ready to lend a ear to this criticism and perhaps change his approach to cinema? Less preaching, more craft? Less saving, more listening?"

Soundarya Athimuthu of The Quint wrote: "The dialogues of Etharkum Thuninthavan are a plus and a minus to the film. It is a mixed bag of cliche and noteworthy dialogues in almost equal proportions". Athimuthu said the antagonist is not well fleshed out well and concluded: "While Etharkkum Thunindhavan is not perfect and has its own flaws, it is a decent attempt as a commercial entertainer with a social cause". Ranjani Krishnakumar of Film Companion stated:

It doesn't help that Suriya feels miscast as Kannabiran. The speech, body language, mannerisms, and naughtiness feel more like Karthi's zone. Suriya is too stiff to be goofy, too upright to be shady, too clear-headed to be vulnerable. He is at his best when he's being the morally unambiguous vigilante, but can barely be convincing as the horny young man rushing to a song-and-dance show. This makes it appear like Suriya is walking in and out of character, making Etharkkum Thunindhavan an overall tough watch.

Manoj Kumar R. of The Indian Express gave a rating of 1.5 out of 5 stars, stating: "At best, Etharkkum Thunindhavan feels like a rush job that whittles down a terrible real-life crime to the lowest common denominator".

== Lawsuit ==
A few functionaries of the Pattali Makkal Katchi (PMK) wrote to cinema-owners' associations in some locations, including Cuddalore and Mayiladuthurai districts, asking them not to screen the film. The dispute between the PMK and Suriya had been ongoing since the premiere of his film Jai Bhim, which the PMK said insulted the Vanniyar caste. He also said they will allow screening of the film only if Suriya publicly apologises to the Vanniyar caste.
