= Gayathiri Iyer =

Indian actress and model

- Born: Gayathiri Iyer; Thirunelveli, Tamilnadu, India
- Other name: Urmila Gayathri
- Occupations: Actress, model
- Years active: 2012–present

Gayathiri Venkatagiri (also known as Gayathri Iyer) is an Indian actress and model who has acted in Kannada, Hindi, Tamil, Telugu, and Bengali films and Hindi television.

== Personal life and career ==
She is from Tamilnadu, and was bought up in Kochi, Kerala.

Her first notable film in Kannada was Namo Bhootatma, a remake of the Tamil film Yaamirukka Bayamey, produced by Eldred Kumar of RS Infotainment and starred Komal and Harish Raj as the male leads. Namo Bhootatma ran for 100 days in Karnataka and was well received by the audience.

Iyer's next release was Ouija in Kannada by Vega Entertainment which was filmed in Malaysia and parts of Bangalore and Hyderabad. It starred Shraddha Das, Madhuri Itagi, Sayaji Shinde and Bharath. She made her television debut in Ekta Kapoor's serial Haiwaan : The Monster and was praised for portraying her natural evil look on camera.

== Filmography ==
Year	Title	Role	Language	Ref.
2011	Shravana	Kala	Kannada	
2012	Six	Tripura	Telugu	
2013	Shrishti		Bengali	
2014	Ninaivil Nindraval		Tamil	
2014	Namo Bhootatma		Kannada	
2015	Ouija	Kshetra	Kannada	
2016	Tyson	Divya	Kannada	
2016	Jaggu Dada	Champa	Kannada	
2016	Meow	Sughana	Tamil	
2017	Ryde		English	
2018	Raid	Mukta Yadav	Hindi	
2019	Ghost	Barkha Khanna	Hindi	
2023	Parundhaaguthu Oor Kuruvi	Yamini	Tamil	
2025	Bazooka		Malayalam	

== Television ==
Year	Serial	Role	Notes
2019	Haiwaan : The Monster	Jiyana "Jiya" Garewal	
2022	Naagin 6	Reem Kataria	
