= Tharagu =

- Poster
- Directed by: Kalanidhi
- Written by: Kalanidhi
- Produced by: Raja
- Starring: Sanjay; Dimple
- Cinematography: A. Kasi Vishwa
- Edited by: S. Ashok Mehta
- Music by: Bharani
- Production company: K R K Cine Creations
- Release date: 28 March 2008
- Country: India
- Language: Tamil

Tharagu is a 2008 Indian Tamil-language romantic drama film directed by Kalanidhi and starring Sanjay and Dimple.

== Cast ==
- Sanjay as Reghu
- Dimple as Kanmani
- Babilona as a rich woman
- Rajan P. Dev as the encounter specialist
- V. M. C. Haneefa as Kanmani's assistant
- Vaiyapuri
- Vinu Chakravarthy as the minister
- Mahanadi Shankar as the deputy secretary
- Poovilangu Mohan
- Singamuthu
- Ganeshkar
- Lakshana

== Production ==
This film marked the debut of Sanjay who starred in Ayyavazhi (2008) and Siruvani (2015) amongst four other unreleased films.

== Soundtrack ==
The music was composed by Bharani. Andal Priyadarshini worked as a lyricist for the film.

== Reception ==
A critic from Sify wrote that "The film leaves you exhausted, as it is lengthy and lacking in lustre. The new actors have miles to go, while the comedy track of Vyapuri and co is irritating. There are too many songs with stupid lines and embarrassing double meaning".
