= Tyson (2016 film) =

- Directed by: K. Ramnarayan
- Screenplay by: K. Ramnarayan
- Dialogues by: V. Anandapriya
- Story by: K. Ramnarayan
- Produced by: T. Babu Reddy
- Starring: Vinod Prabhakar; Gayathiri Iyer
- Cinematography: K. M. Vishnuvardhana; Rajashekar
- Edited by: Venkatesh UDV
- Music by: Songs: Ravi Basrur; Jassie Gift; R. S. Ganesh; Score: Ravi Basrur
- Production company: Druvin Productions
- Distributed by: Sri Veeranjaneya Swamy Productions; Mayoora Films; Sun World Cinemas; Surya Films
- Release date: 4 March 2016
- Country: India
- Language: Kannada

Tyson is a 2016 Indian Kannada-language action drama film written and directed by K. Ramnarayan and starring Vinod Prabhakar and Gayathiri Iyer.

== Cast ==
- Vinod Prabhakar as Deepu
- Gayathiri Iyer as Divya
- Thriller Manju
- Srinivasa Murthy
- Vinaya Prasad
- Suman
- Ravi Kale
- Chikkanna
- Master Druvin
- M. S. Umesh
- Honnavalli Krishna
- Mohan Juneja
- Layendra
- Victory Vasu
- Kuri Prathap
- Tharanga Vishwa
- Vijay Chendoor
- T. Babu Reddy
- Ugramm Ravi

== Soundtrack ==
All music is composed by Ravi Basrur, Jassie Gift, and R. S. Ganesh.

Track listing
No.	Title	Lyrics	Music	Singer(s)	Length
1.	"Abbara Shuru"	K. Ramnarayan	Ravi Basrur	Chandan Shetty	4:00
2.	"Kannalle Kuntebille"	Yogaraj Bhat	R. S. Ganesh	Vijay Prakash, Apoorva Sridhar	3:56
3.	"Avanyaranthale Gothilla"	K. Ramnarayan	Jassie Gift	Tippu	4:20
4.	"Preethi Yaake"	K. Ramnarayan	R. S. Ganesh	Lahari	2:36
5.	"Abbara Shuru - Reprise"	K. Ramnarayan	Ravi Basrur	Chandan Shetty	3:31
6.	"Shikarava Yeralu"	V. Nagendra Prasad	R. S. Ganesh	R. S. Ganesh	3:34
7.	"Preethisthini Preethisthini"	K. Ramnarayan	Jassie Gift	Chaithra, Jassie Gift, Shashank Sheshagiri, Santhosh Venky	4:18
Total length:					26:15

== Reception ==
Sunayana Suresh of The Times of India rated the film three out of five stars and wrote, "Watch this film if you love your dose of masala-laden commercial cinema, for it promises just that - entertainment with no strings attached". Shyam Prasad S of the Bangalore Mirror wrote, "Tyson may not stand apart as a landmark film in Sandalwood but it will in Vinod’s career. The film is sure to establish him as a lead actor to look out for". Shashiprasad SM of the Deccan Chronicle wrote, "Vinod who returns with good package of decent dance moves, much improved voice base, confident approach, and most of all with the right punches (action) makes it a good one time watch". A critic from Prajavani wrote the film asserts that the police believe that protecting the people is more important than their own family.

== Box office ==
The film ran for 25 days. After the success of this film, Vinod Prabhakar added an extra 'n' to his name.
