= Meow (2016 film) =

2016 Indian film by Chinnas Palanisamy

- Theatrical release poster
- Directed by: Chinnas Palanisamy
- Produced by: Vincent Adaikalaraj
- Starring: Jenny; Raja; Sanjay; Hayden; Kumar; Urmila Gayathri
- Cinematography: Bojan K Dinesh
- Edited by: Sathish Suriya
- Music by: Sreejith Edavano
- Production company: Global Woods Movies
- Release date: 30 December 2016
- Running time: 112 minutes
- Country: India
- Language: Tamil

Meow is a 2016 Indian Tamil-language thriller film directed by Chinnas Palanisamy and starring a persian cat named Jenny in the lead role along with Raja, Sanjay, Hayden, Kumar and Urmila Gayathri.

== Cast ==
- Jenny as Selfie
- Raja as Gowtham
- Sanjay Micky as Karthi
- Hayden as Kiran
- Kumar as Akash
- Urmila Gayathri as Sughana
- Shiney as Kutty
- Daniel Annie Pope as WhatsApp Mani
- Yuvina Parthavi as Shelby's caretaker
- Stanley as Shelby's caretaker's father
- Sai Gopi as a psycho
- Telephone Raj as constable
- Anand Thaka as the police sub-inspector
- Mohana as Mayil

== Production ==
This was the first time a cat played the lead role in a Tamil film. The makers of the film bought a cat named Jenny for the film and used computer graphics for anything that the cat cannot do.

== Music ==
The music for the film was composed by Sreejith Edavano.

Track listing
No.	Title	Lyrics	Singer(s)	Length
1.	"Oru Cute Little Ponnu"	Vivek	Neha Venugopal, Sooraj Santhosh	4:26
2.	"Bang Bang"	Navin Kannan	Deepak, Shaan Johnson, Sharanya Gopinath	3:47
3.	"Paavam Intha Poonai"	Navin Kannan	Sreejith Edavano	3:51
4.	"Inky Pinky"	Navin Kannan	Sreejith Edavano	1:25
5.	"Paavam Intha Poonai (Pathos)"	Navin Kannan	Sreejith Edavano	1:26
Total length:				14:55

== Reception ==
Thinkal Menon of The Times of India gave the film a rating of two out of five stars and said that "The director has attempted to bring difference to a done-to-death plot by giving importance to a cat. Though the idea isn't bad, the poor quality of the computer graphics and ineffective screenplay let down the entire film". Chitra Deepa Anantharam of The Hindu mocked the film and said that "Those of you who withstood the last 30 minutes, may you come across an empty ATM loaded with cash or at least get change for Rs. 2000". On the contrary, Malini Mannath of The New Indian Express opined that "With 112 minutes of running time, Meow is a watchable and an engaging entertainer". A critic from Samayam said that the film could be enjoyed if you overlook the minor glitches. Critics from Dinamalar and Maalai Malar criticised the age-old storyline.
