= Virudhagiri =

- Theatrical release poster
- Directed by: Vijayakanth
- Written by: Vijayakanth
- Produced by: Vijayakanth; L. K. Sudhish
- Starring: Vijayakanth; Madhuri Itagi; Arun Pandian
- Narrated by: Vijayakanth
- Cinematography: K. Boopathy
- Edited by: S. Saleem
- Music by: Sundar C Babu
- Production company: Captain Cine Creations
- Release date: 10 December 2010
- Running time: 143 minutes
- Country: India
- Language: Tamil

Virudhagiri (transl. Award) is a 2010 Indian Tamil-language action thriller film written and directed by Vijayakanth, making his directorial debut, besides playing the title character as well. This was also his final film in his cinematic career before his full-fledged career into politics. The film, co-starring Madhuri Itagi, Arun Pandian and Mansoor Ali Khan among others, released on 10 December 2010 It is a remake of the English-language French film Taken.

== Plot ==
Virudhagiri, a sincere police officer endeavors in safeguarding the societal peace. Gaining international recognition for accomplishing a security task in foreign countries, he returns to Chennai handling a serious case of transgender people being scourged to death for organ racketing. On an unexpected turn, when his niece Priya was undertaking a trip to Australia, she gets kidnapped by a group of strangers. Using his high-skilled intelligence activities, Virudhagiri flies down to the foreign land of Albania for the rescue.

== Cast ==
- Vijayakanth as Virudhagiri IPS
- Arun Pandian as Franklin Williams, Australian police officer
- Madhuri Itagi as Priya
- K. C. Shankar as Mike Anderson
- Russell Geoffrey Banks as Chief of Australian police
- Mansoor Ali Khan as Police inspector
- Shanmugarajan
- Santhana Bharathi as Police commissioner
- Chaams as Saamy
- Peeli Sivam as Virudhagiri's father
- Kalairani as Virudhagiri's mother
- Uma as Priya's mother
- Aman Deep Singh
- Meesai Rajendranath

== Soundtrack ==
The soundtrack was composed by Sundar C. Babu. The audio was launched at Chennai Trade Centre in November 2010.

Title	Singer(s)	Lyrics	Length (m:ss)
"Makkal Oru Puram"	Shankar Mahadevan	Vaali	05:07
"Devathai Ondru"	Hariharan, Chinmayi	Snehan	04:11
"Mannavane Mandhirane"	Senthildass Velayutham, M. M. Srilekha, Manikka Vinayagam	Yugabharathi	04:29
"Pookal Endrom"	Sadhana Sargam	Na. Muthukumar	04:02
"Yezhaigal Thozhaa"	S. P. Balasubrahmanyam	Snehan	04:30

== Reception ==
Pavithra Srinivasan of Rediff wrote, "It might not be a great movie, or even a good one, but Virudhagiri was made for only one purpose: To be a political vehicle for Vijaykanth. And it serves that purpose admirably". The New Indian Express wrote, " Vijayakant has bounced back with a vengeance. With the script racy and fast paced, and going full throttle on an unabashed image-boosting exercise, he has projected himself in the most flattering way possible. It should be an ideal treat for the Captain fans!". Sify viewed the film as a propaganda criticising the incumbent Tamil Nadu government run by the DMK.
