= Six (film) =

- Theatrical release poster
- Directed by: Srikanth Lingaad
- Written by: Srikanth Lingaad
- Produced by: Bollamoni Krishna
- Starring: Jagapati Babu; Gayathri Iyer
- Cinematography: Prabha R Karan
- Edited by: R. J. Sada Charan
- Music by: Lekha Ratna Kumar
- Production company: Vega Entertainment Pvt Ltd
- Release date: 2012
- Running time: 117 minutes
- Country: India
- Language: Telugu

Six or Aaaru is a 2012 Telugu-language mystery thriller film, created by Vega Entertainment Pvt Ltd. The film was produced by Bollamoni Krishna and directed by Srikanth Lingaad. It stars Jagapati Babu, Gayathri Iyer and music composed by Ravi Varna. The film, which was also dubbed into Hindi, was average.

== Cast ==
- Jagapati Babu as Vijay
- Gayathri Iyer as Tripura
- Satyam Rajesh as Police Officer
- Pruthvi Raj as Jagga Reddy
- Surya as Scientist
- Debina Bonnerjee as an item dancer in the song 'Surru Surru'.

== Soundtrack ==
Six

Film score by Ravi Varma
- Released: 2012
- Genre: Soundtrack
- Length: 19:16
- Label: VEGA Music
- Producer: Ravi Varma

The soundtrack was composed by Ravi Varma and released on VEGA Music Company.

No.	Title	Lyrics	Singer(s)	Length
1.	"Andhamaina Teenage"	Srinivas Mukkamala	Ravi Varma	3:36
2.	"Nee Jathalona"	Srinivas Mukkamala	Dinkar, Anjana Sowmya	4:05
3.	"Surru Surru"	Bhaskarbhatla	Sravana Bhargavi	3:30
4.	"Unnadhi Okate Life"	Sagar Raya	Hemachandra	3:07
5.	"Nee Jathalona (Theme Music)"	Music Bit	Instrumental	1:23
6.	"Andhamaina Teenage (F)"	Srinivas Mukkamala	Shivani	3:35
Total length:				19:16
