= Kaarni =

2018 Indian Kannada-language thriller drama film

- Theatrical release poster
- Directed by: Vini
- Written by: Vini
- Produced by: Govindaraju A.H. Alur
- Starring: Duniya Rashmi; Niranth
- Edited by: Vinay G Alur
- Music by: Arindam Goswamy
- Production company: Gokula Entertainers
- Distributed by: Kaivalya
- Release date: 14 September 2018
- Country: India
- Language: Kannada

Kaarni is a 2018 Indian Kannada-language thriller drama film directed by Vini and starring Duniya Rashmi and Niranth. The film was released to mixed reviews.

== Cast ==
- Duniya Rashmi as Tanu
- Niranth as Shankar
- Rajesh Ramakrishna as the police inspector
- Karan Gaja

== Production ==
The film was shot in Bengaluru, Chikkmagalur, and Shivamogga.

== Soundtrack ==
The film features no songs and its score is composed by Arindam Goswamy.

== Reception ==
Sunayana Suresh of The Times of India rated the film 2.5/5 and wrote, "This is an interesting premise and has its moments. If you like thrillers that employ some of the regular tropes then this might just pique your interest. But be warned that there are some parts that might not be on par with the genre and can be a let down in terms of consistency". A Sharadhaa of The New Indian Express wrote, "The film’s story mostly lies in the second half, when the director explains the reason behind the missing girl. Unfortunately, by that point, the attention of audience is lost". Aravind Shwetha of The News Minute wrote, "Overall, the movie loses steam quickly. There are some pacing issues too, especially in the beginning, and paired with the choppy editing, it makes for a slow ride". A critic from chitratara.com rated the film 3/5 and wrote, " Another haunting film with dark shade in the capture of scenes keeps you engaged especially in the second half and the search for missing heroines and revenge saga is crux of the film".
