= Rashmi (actress) =

Indian actress

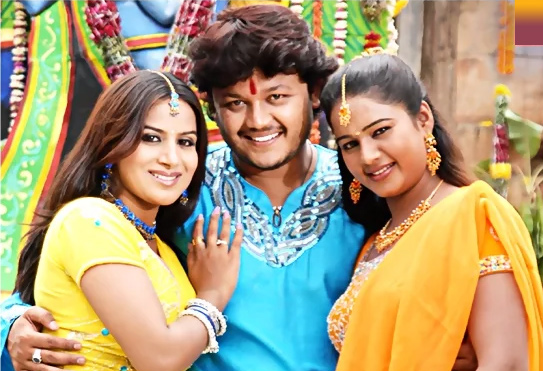
- From L-R, Pooja Gandhi, Ganesh, Rashmi in 2007 Kannada film Krishna
- Other names: Duniya Rashmi
- Citizenship: India
- Occupation: Actress
- Years active: 2007-present
- Notable work: Duniya (2007)

Rashmi (also known as Duniya Rashmi) is an Indian actress in the Kannada film industry. She made her acting debut as the lead actress in Duniya (2007), which gave her popularity.

== Career ==
Rashmi gained popularity as actress in 2007 Kannada film Duniya, and earned the name Duniya Rashmi. She then worked on the unreleased films Action by Om Sai Prakash and Premaya Namaha, where she had to lose 10 kilograms of weight. She also worked on the film Venki starring Orata Prashanth and Murari (2015) with Sriimurali, which had a delayed release. Rashmi played a tribal alongside Sriki in Birth (2016). She starred opposite Yuvraj in Asthitva (2016) although she noted that she was not "in too many scenes".

She was a participant in Bigg Boss Kannada (Season 7) in 2019, a reality show which included a total of twenty contestants. In 2020, she starred in the thriller film Kaarni with her performance as a mute woman called the film's "saving grace".

== Filmography ==
Year	Film	Role	Notes
2007	Duniya	Poornima	
2007	Krishna		Special appearance in the song "Gollara Golla"
2008	Hrudaya I Miss You	Poorni	Special appearance
2008	Mandakini		
2008	Akka Thangi	Kaveri	
2009	Anu		
2009	Venki	Swathi	
2012	Ashakiranagalu	Ranjitha	
2015	Murari	Kavya	
2016	Preethi Kithabu	Preethi	
2016	Birth		
2016	Asthitva		
2018	Kaarni	Tanu	
2019	Aatakkuntu Lekkakkilla		
2020	Jaggi Jagannatha		
2020	Avanalli Ivalilli		
2023	Ranginaa Raate		

=== Television ===
Year	Title	Role	Channel	Notes
2019	Bigg Boss Kannada season 7	Contestant	Colors Kannada	Evicted Day 21

== Awards ==
Year	Award	Category	Film	Result	Ref.
2007	Filmfare Awards South	Best Actress	Duniya	Won	
2008	Suvarna Film Awards	Best Debut Actress	Duniya	Won	

== See also ==
- List of people from Karnataka
- Cinema of Karnataka
- List of Indian film actresses
- Cinema of India
