= Priyanka Mohan =

Indian actress and diplomat (born 1994)

- Priyanka in 2024

Honorary Ambassador of Korea Tourism
- Incumbent
- Assumed office 1 June 2026
- President: Lee Jae Myung
- Preceded by: Position established

Personal details
- Born: Priyanka Arul Mohan; 20 November 1994 (age 31) Bangalore, Karnataka, India
- Education: B.E, PES University
- Occupation: Actress

Priyanka Arul Mohan (born 20 November 1994) is an Indian actress who is also serving as the Honorary Ambassador of Korea Tourism since June 2026. As an actress she has appeared primarily in Tamil and Telugu films. She made her acting debut with the Kannada film Ondh Kathe Hella (2019), and had commercial success with; the Telugu films Gang Leader (2019), Saripodhaa Sanivaaram (2024), They Call Him OG (2025) and the Tamil films Doctor (2021), Don (2022) and Etharkkum Thunindhavan (2022).

== Early life ==
Priyanka Arul Mohan was born on 20 November 1994. Her father is a Tamilian and her mother is a Kannadiga. She did her schooling from Alvas PU College, Moodabidri. She studied Biological engineering from PES University in Bangalore. She lives in Chennai.

== Career ==
Priyanka in 2022

Priyanka made her debut in the Kannada film Ondh Kathe Hella, directed by Girish G in 2019. Later that year, she starred in the Telugu film Nani's Gang Leader directed by Vikram Kumar. Krishna Sripada of The News Minute on her performance wrote "Priyanka has all the makings of a female protagonist directors will seek, doe-eyed innocence and a natural feel for the camera, as she subtly does exactly what is expected and not more or less". She also shot for the English version of the bilingual film Mayan and Tik Tok; however, both films were delayed.

In 2021, she made her Tamil debut with Sivakarthikeyan's Doctor, directed by Nelson Dilipkumar. Both the film and her performance received positive response. The film grossed ₹100 crores in worldwide box office and became a major critical and commercial success. She won SIIMA Award for Best Debutant Actress. In 2022, she played the lead female role in her second Tamil film Etharkkum Thunindhavan with director Pandiraj, starring Suriya. Pinkvilla wrote "Priyanka doesn't have much to do in the plot but adds a dose of glamour to the film." She also played the lead in the Tamil film Don, with Sivakarthikeyan after Doctor. The film received mostly positive reviews from critics and audience. S Subhakeerthana of OTT Play wrote "Priyanka Mohan makes her presence felt with whatever she was offered." She then appeared in Captain Miller starring Dhanush and Saripodhaa Sanivaaram with Nani. Her last release for the year was Brother, directed by M. Rajesh, where she stars alongside Jayam Ravi. Praveen Sudaven from The Hindu wrote "Priyanka Mohan’s character is underwritten, mostly limited to “love interest” status, and her underwhelming performance doesn’t help." The film was met with negative reviews and was a Box-office bomb.

In 2025, she made a cameo appearance in the song "Golden Sparrow" in the film Nilavuku En Mel Ennadi Kobam directed by Dhanush. She revealed that the team shot the song in one day without any rehearsal. Her next film They Call Him OG, starring Pawan Kalyan released on 25 September 2025 which received mixed-to-positive reviews. The Times of India reviewed her performance stating "Priyanka Arul Mohan’s Kanmani feels underwritten." while The Hindu stated " Priyanka Arul Mohan does what she can within a limited scope.". She will next star alongside Kavin in an untitled fantasy romantic comedy film directed by Ken Royson.

== Other work ==
On 1 June 2026, Priyanka was appointed as the Honorary Ambassador of Korea Tourism by the Government of South Korea and president Lee Jae Myung. She was given the title following the release of her film Made in Korea (2025).

== Filmography ==
Key
†	Denotes films that have not yet been released

=== Films ===
Year	Title	Role(s)	Language(s)	Notes	Ref.
2019	Ondh Kathe Hella	Adhiti	Kannada		
2019	Nani's Gang Leader	Priya	Telugu		
2021	Sreekaram	Chaitra	Telugu		
2021	Doctor	Padmini "Mini"	Tamil		
2022	Etharkkum Thunindhavan	Aadhini Kannabiran	Tamil		
2022	Don	Angaiyarkanni	Tamil		
2024	Captain Miller	Velmathi	Tamil		
2024	Saripodhaa Sanivaaram	Charulatha "Charu" / Kalyani "Kallu"	Telugu		
2024	Brother	Archana Sivagurunathan	Tamil		
2025	Nilavuku En Mel Ennadi Kobam	Herself	Tamil	Special appearance in song "Golden Sparrow"	
2025	They Call Him OG	Dr. Kanmani	Telugu		
2026	Made in Korea	Shenbagam	Tamil; Korean; English	Trilingual film	
2027	Kavin #9 †	TBA	Tamil	Filming	
2027	666 Operation Dream Theater †	TBA	Kannada	Filming	
2027	Manjanaththi †	TBA	Tamil	Filming	
2027	AGS29 †	TBA	Tamil	Filming	
2027	Thulabaram †	Krishnaveni	Telugu	Filming	

== Awards and nominations ==
Year	Award	Category	Film	Result	Ref.
2019	South Indian International Movie Awards	Best Female Debut – Telugu	Nani's Gang Leader	Nominated	
2022	South Indian International Movie Awards	Best Female Debut – Tamil	Doctor	Won	
