= Ondh Kathe Hella =

- Theatrical release poster
- Directed by: Girish G
- Starring: Thandav Ram; Priyanka Mohan; Somanna; Pratheek; Thara Sadashivaiah
- Cinematography: Keertan Poojary
- Music by: Ronada Bakkesh; Karthik C. Rao
- Production company: Petas Cine Cafe
- Release date: 8 March 2019
- Country: India
- Language: Kannada

Ondh Kathe Hella (transl. Shall I Tell a Story?) is a 2019 Indian Kannada-language film directed by Girish G and starring Thandav Ram and Somanna. It was released on 8 March 2019. It was the debut movie of Priyanka Mohan.

== Cast ==
- Thandav Ram as Sharath
- Priyanka Mohan as Adhiti
- Somanna
- Pratheek as Keerthi
- Thara Sadashivaiah as Vandana
- Karthik Rao as Govind.
- Sowmya Ramakanth as Sowmya
- Girish G as Rangachari

== Production ==
Made through crowdfunding, Ondh Kathe Hella is an anthology film in Kannada cinema.

== Reception ==
The film was released on 8 March 2019. A critic from The Times of India wrote "this film tries to mix different styles of thriller tales that have been woven together by one thread. What works for the film is that it stays clear from the gimmicks and tropes used in horror films. At the same time, the scary quotient in the film is relatively less, which can work in both ways".
