= Madhuri Itagi =

Indian actress (born 1993)

- Born: 7 October 1993 (age 32); Hubballi, Karnataka, India
- Occupation: Actress
- Years active: 2004–2016
- Known for: Roles in primarily Kannada movies
- Height: 5 ft 7 in (170 cm)
- Awards: Miss Karnataka 2011

Madhuri Itagi (born 7 October 1993) is an Indian actress who works in predominantly Kannada-language films. She made her debut in Tenali Rama (2006). She has acted in Kannada films like Rambo (2012) and Ouija (2015). She is also well known for her part in the reality TV show Bigg Boss Kannada 3; she was eliminated from it in the first round of participation. She was also crowned Miss Karnataka in 2011.

She is from Hubballi.

== Filmography ==
Year	Film	Role	Language	Notes
2006	Tenali Rama		Kannada	
2008	Marujanma		Kannada	Credited as Dimple
2008	Tharagu	Kanmani	Tamil	Credited as Dimple
2009	Chickpete Sachagalu		Kannada	
2010	Sathya		Kannada	Credited as Dimple
2010	Appu and Pappu	Rita	Kannada	
2010	Virudhagiri	Priya	Tamil	
2011	Kadhimaru		Kannada	
2012	Rambo	Revathi	Kannada	
2015	Ouija	Krishna	Kannada	
2015	Murari		Kannada	
2016	Mandya to Mumbai		Kannada	Special appearance

=== Television ===
- Muktha
- Kadambari

== See also ==
- List of people from Karnataka
- Cinema of Karnataka
- List of Indian film actresses
- Cinema of India
