= 9th South Indian International Movie Awards =

Indian annual film awards event

- Official title card
- Awarded for: Excellence in South Indian cinema and Music
- Announced on: Nominations: 16 August 2021
- Presented on: 18–19 September 2021
- Site: Hyderabad International Convention Center (HICC), Hyderabad, India
- Hosted by: 2019; Sreemukhi; Sundeep Kishan; Dhanya Balakrishna
- Organized by: Vibri Media Group

Highlights
- Best Film: 2019; Jersey (Telugu); Kaithi (Tamil); Yajamana (Kannada); Lucifer (Malayalam); 2020; Ala Vaikunthapurramuloo (Telugu); Soorarai Pottru (Tamil); Love Mocktail (Kannada); Ayyappanum Koshiyum (Malayalam)
- Lifetime achievement: Sheela (2019); K. Viswanath (2020)
- Most awards: 2020; Ala Vaikunthapurramuloo (Telugu) – 10
- Most nominations: 2019 Kumbalangi Nights (Malayalam) – 13; Yajamana (Kannada) – 12; Maharshi (Telugu) – 10; Majili (Telugu) – 10; 2020; Soorarai Pottru (Tamil) – 14; Ala Vaikunthapurramuloo (Telugu) – 12; Sarileru Neekevvaru (Telugu) – 12

Television coverage
- Channel: Gemini TV; Sun TV; Surya TV; Udaya TV
- Network: Sun TV Network

The 9th South Indian International Movie Awards is an awards event held at Hyderabad International Convention Centre, Hyderabad on 18–19 September 2021. The ceremony (9th SIIMA) recognised and honoured the best films and performances from Telugu, Tamil, Malayalam and Kannada films and music released in 2019 and 2020, along with special honors for lifetime contributions and a few special awards.

In 2020, the awards ceremony could not take place due to COVID-19 pandemic in India. So, it was scheduled for 11–12 September 2021. Later, it was rescheduled to 18–19 September 2021. The nomination list for the main awards was announced in August 2021. Sreemukhi, Sundeep Kishan and Dhanya Balakrishna have hosted the 2019 section (first day) of the awards ceremony. A total of 112 recipients won the awards in 21 categories across the four languages on the first day (2019 section). The winners for the year 2020 were announced on the second day of the event.

== 2019 winners and nominees ==
=== Honorary awards ===
- Lifetime Achievement Award — Sheela

=== Main awards ===
Sources: Nominations: Winners:

==== Film ====
Best Film
Telugu	Tamil
Jersey – Sithara Entertainments; Maharshi – Sri Venkateswara Creations; Majili – Shine Screens; Sye Raa Narasimha Reddy – Konidela Production Company; F2: Fun and Frustration – Sri Venkateswara Creations	Kaithi – Dream Warrior Pictures; Peranbu – Shree Rajalakshmi Films; Asuran – V Creations; Namma Veettu Pillai – Sun Pictures; Viswasam – Sathya Jyothi Films
Kannada	Malayalam
Yajamana – Media House Studio; Bell Bottom – Golden Horse Cinema; Natasaarvabhowma – Rockline Productions; Avane Srimannarayana – Pushkar Films, Shree Devi Entertainers; Bharaate – Sri Jagadguru Movies	Lucifer – Aashirvad Cinemas; Uyare – S Cube Films, Grihalakshmi Productions; Jallikattu – Opus Penta; Unda – Moviee Mill, Gemini Studios; Kumbalangi Nights – Fahadh Faasil & Friends, Working Class Hero
Best Director
Telugu	Tamil
Vamshi Paidipally – Maharshi; B. V. Nandini Reddy – Oh! Baby; Puri Jagannadh – iSmart Shankar; Anil Ravipudi – F2: Fun and Frustration; Gowtam Tinnanuri – Jersey; Shiva Nirvana – Majili	Vetrimaaran – Asuran; Lokesh Kanagaraj – Kaithi; Thiagarajan Kumararaja – Super Deluxe; Ram – Peranbu; R. Parthiban – Oththa Seruppu Size 7
Kannada	Malayalam
V. Harikrishna, Pon Kumaran – Yajamana; Chetan Kumar – Bharaate; Jayatheertha – Bell Bottom; Hemanth M Rao – Kavaludaari; Pavan Wadeyar – Natasaarvabhowma	Lijo Jose Pellissery – Jallikattu; Khalidh Rahman – Unda; Geetu Mohandas – Moothon; Aashiq Abu – Virus; Joshiy – Porinju Mariam Jose
Best Cinematographer
Telugu	Tamil
Sanu Varghese – Jersey; R. Rathnavelu – Sye Raa Narasimha Reddy; K. U. Mohanan – Maharshi; Raj Thota – ISmart Shankar; R. Madhi – Saaho	R. Velraj – Asuran; Ramji – Oththa Seruppu Size 7; Theni Eswar – Peranbu; G. K. Vishnu – Bigil; Sathyan Sooryan – Kaithi
Kannada	Malayalam
Mahen Simha – Rustum; Girish.R.Gowda – Bharaate; Karm Chawla – Avane Srimannarayana; Abhimanyu Sadanandan – Mundina Nildana; Shreesha Kuduvalli – Yajamana	Sanu Varghese – Android Kunjappan Version 5.25; Girish Gangadharan – Jallikattu; Shyju Khalid – Kumbalangi Nights; Rajeev Ravi – Moothon; Abinandhan Ramanujam – Nine

==== Acting ====
Best Actor
Telugu	Tamil
Mahesh Babu – Maharshi; Ram Pothineni – ISmart Shankar; Nani – Jersey; Varun Tej – Gaddalakonda Ganesh; Naga Chaitanya – Majili; Naveen Polishetty – Agent Sai Srinivasa Athreya	Dhanush – Asuran; Vijay – Bigil; Karthi – Kaithi; Ajith Kumar – Viswasam; Sivakarthikeyan – Namma Veettu Pillai; Vijay Sethupathi – Super Deluxe
Kannada	Malayalam
Darshan – Yajamana; Puneeth Rajkumar – Natasaarvabhowma; Rakshit Shetty – Avane Srimannarayana; Sriimurali – Bharaate; Rishi – Kavaludaari	Mohanlal – Lucifer; Mammootty – Unda; Nivin Pauly – Moothon; Asif Ali – Kettyolaanu Ente Malakha; Suraj Venjaramoodu – Vikruthi / Android Kunjappan Version 5.25
Best Actress
Telugu	Tamil
Samantha Akkineni – Oh! Baby; Pooja Hegde – Maharshi; Shraddha Srinath – Jersey; Rashmika Mandanna – Dear Comrade; Raashi Khanna – Prati Roju Pandage	Nayanthara – Viswasam; Amala Paul – Aadai; Tamannaah Bhatia – Kanne Kalaimaane; Manju Warrier – Asuran; Jyothika – Raatchasi
Kannada	Malayalam
Rachita Ram – Ayushman Bhava; Rashmika Mandanna – Yajamana; Shanvi Srivastava – Avane Srimannarayana; Anupama Parameswaran – Natasaarvabhowma; Radhika Narayan – Mundina Nildana	Manju Warrier – Lucifer/Prathi Poovankozhi (Note: Nominated for two films – Lucifer and Prathi Poovankozhi. But won the award for the film Lucifer); Parvathy Thiruvothu – Uyare; Rajisha Vijayan – June; Nimisha Sajayan – Chola; Anna Ben – Helen
Best Actor in a Supporting Role
Telugu	Tamil
Allari Naresh – Maharshi; Rao Ramesh – Prati Roju Pandage; Rajendra Prasad – Oh! Baby; Atharvaa – Gaddalakonda Ganesh; Suhas – Majili	George Maryan – Kaithi; Sathyaraj – Thambi; Nedumudi Venu – Sarvam Thaala Mayam; Narain – Kaithi; Kishore – House Owner
Kannada	Malayalam
Devaraj – Yajamana; P. D. Sathish Chandra – Bell Bottom; Pramod Shetty – Avane Srimannarayana; Ajay Raj – Mundina Nildana; Ravishankar Gowda – 99	Roshan Mathew – Moothon; Shane Nigam – Kumbalangi Nights; Joju George – June; Suraj Venjaramoodu – Finals / Driving Licence; Soubin Shahir – Kumbalangi Nights
Best Actress in a Supporting Role
Telugu	Tamil
Lakshmi – Oh! Baby; Nivetha Pethuraj – Chitralahari; Mirnalini Ravi – Gaddalakonda Ganesh; Jhansi – Mallesham; Ananya Agarwal – Majili	Indhuja Ravichandran – Magamuni; Ramya Krishnan – Super Deluxe; Vinodhini – Game Over; Sriranjani – House Owner; Anjali – Peranbu
Kannada	Malayalam
Karunya Ram – Mane Maratakkide; Nidhi Subbaiah – Ayushman Bhava; Kavya Sha – Mookajjiya Kanasugalu; Sonu Gowda – I Love You; Tanya Hope – Yajamana	Saniya Iyappan – Lucifer; Grace Antony – Kumbalangi Nights; Miya George – Driving Licence; Surabhi Lakshmi – Vikruthi; Leona Lishoy – Ishq
Best Actor in a Negative Role
Telugu	Tamil
Kartikeya Gummakonda – Nani's Gang Leader; Jagapathi Babu – Maharshi; Regina Cassandra – Evaru; Vivek Oberoi – Vinaya Vidheya Rama; Sonu Sood – Sita	Arjun Das – Kaithi; Nawazuddin Siddiqui – Petta; K. S. Ravikumar – Comali; Bagavathi Perumal – Super Deluxe; Jagapathi Babu – Viswasam
Kannada	Malayalam
P. Sai Kumar – Bharaate; Thakur Anoop Singh – Yajamana; P. Ravi Shankar – Natasaarvabhowma; Kabir Duhan Singh – Pailwaan; Balaji Manohar – Avane Srimannarayana	Shine Tom Chacko – Ishq; Fahadh Faasil – Kumbalangi Nights; Sabumon Abdusamad – Jallikattu; Vivek Anand Oberoi – Lucifer; Roshan Mathew – Thottappan
Best Comedian
Telugu	Tamil
Ajay Ghosh – Raju Gari Gadhi 3; Priyadarshi, Rahul Ramakrishna – Brochevarevarura; Abhinav Gomatam – Meeku Maathrame Cheptha; Vennela Kishore – Chitralahari; Satya – Mathu Vadalara	Yogi Babu – Comali; Dheena – Kaithi; Karunakaran – Monster; Anandaraj - Jackpot; Munishkanth - Irandam Ulagaporin Kadaisi Gundu
Kannada	Malayalam
Sadhu Kokila – Yajamana; Nayana – Seetharama Kalyana; Achyuth Kumar – Avane Srimannarayana; Chikkanna – Natasaarvabhowma; Appanna – Pailwaan	Basil Joseph – Kettyolaanu Ente Malakha; Baiju Santhosh – Mera Naam Shaji; Aju Varghese – Love Action Drama; Balu Varghese – Vijay Superum Pournamiyum; Saiju Kurup – Driving Licence

==== Debut awards ====
Best Debut Actor
Telugu	Tamil
Sri Simha – Mathu Vadalara; Anand Deverakonda – Dorasaani; Kiran Abbavaram – Raja Vaaru Rani Gaaru; Meghamsh Srihari – Rajdooth; Vijay Raja – Edaina Jaragocchu	Ken Karunas – Asuran; Vishwa – Champion; Abi Hassan – Kadaram Kondan; Santosh Sreeram – To Let; Dhruv Vikram – Adithya Varma
Kannada	Malayalam
Abhishek Ambareesh – Amar; Dhanveer Gowda – Bazaar; Viraat – Kiss; Bhuvann Ponnannaa – Randhawa; Shreyas Manju – Padde Huli	Sarjano Khalid – June; Mathew Thomas – Kumbalangi Nights; Akshay Radhakrishnan – Pathinettam Padi; Saranjith – Nalpathiyonnu (41); Naveen Nazim – Ambili
Best Debut Actress
Telugu	Tamil
Shivathmika Rajashekhar – Dorasaani; Priyanka Arul Mohan – Nani's Gang Leader; Anagha – Guna 369; Divyansha Kaushik – Majili; Ananya Nagalla – Mallesham	Anagha – Natpe Thunai; Lovelyn Chandrasekhar – House Owner; Banita Sandhu – Adithya Varma; Tanya Hope – Thadam; Mirnalini Ravi – Champion
Kannada	Malayalam
Sree Leela – Kiss; Vaibhavi/ Vainidhi/ Vaisiri – Yaana; Sanjana Anand – Chemistry of Kariyappa; A Kashyap – Kiss; Sanah Thimmayyah – Odeya	Anna Ben – Helen; Priya Prakash Varrier – Oru Adaar Love; Priyamvada Krishnan – Thottappan; Prachi Tehlan – Mamangam; Sanjana Dipu – Moothon
Best Debut Director
Telugu	Tamil
Swaroop RSJ – Agent Sai Srinivasa Athreya; Venkat Ramji – Evaru; Ritesh Rana – Mathu Vadalara; Raj R – Mallesham; Vishwak Sen – Falaknuma Das	Pradeep Ranganathan – Comali; V. J. Gopinath – Jiivi; Sri Senthil – Kaalidas; Chezhiyan – To Let; Athiyan Athirai – Irandam Ulagaporin Kadaisi Gundu
Kannada	Malayalam
Mayuraa Raghavendra – Kannad Gothilla; Ravi Varma – Rustum; Vinay Bharadwaj – Mundina Nildana; Sachin Ravi – Avane Srimannarayana; Roopa Rao – Gantumoote	Prithviraj Sukumaran – Lucifer; Manu Ashokan – Uyare; Madhu C. Narayanan – Kumbalangi Nights; Ratheesh Balakrishnan Poduval – Android Kunjappan Version 5.25; Girish A.D – Thanneer Mathan Dinangal
Best Debut Producer
Telugu	Tamil
Studio 99 (Raj R, Sri Adhikari) – Mallesham; Manyam Productions – Brochevarevarura; Vanmaye Creations – Falaknuma Das; Kill of the Hill Entertainments – Meeku Maathrame Cheptha; Lakshya Productions – Rajdooth	V Studios – Aadai; Zee Studios, Bayview Projects LLP – Nerkonda Paarvai; Tyler Durden and Kino Fist, Alchemy Vision Works, East West Dream Work Entertainment – Super Deluxe; Vetrivel Saravana Cinemas, Big Print Production – Jiivi; Diya Movies – Kolaigaran
Kannada	Malayalam
Coastal Breeze Productions – Mundina Nildana; PRK Productions – Kavaludaari; AP Arjun Films – Kiss; Sri Ramaratna Productions – Kannad Gothilla; RRR Motion Pictures – Pailwaan	Scube Films – Uyare; Plan J Studios – Thanneer Mathan Dinangal; Funtastic Films – Love Action Drama; Working Class Hero – Kumbalangi Nights; Kavya Film Company – Mamangam

==== Music ====
Best Music Director
Telugu	Tamil
Devi Sri Prasad – Maharshi; Mani Sharma – ISmart Shankar; Anirudh Ravichander – Jersey; Mickey J Meyer – Gaddalakonda Ganesh; Gopi Sundar – Majili	D. Imman – Viswasam; Anirudh Ravichander – Petta; A. R. Rahman – Bigil; G. V. Prakash Kumar – Asuran; Yuvan Shankar Raja – Peranbu
Kannada	Malayalam
V. Harikrishna – Yajamana; Arjun Janya – Bharaate; Charan Raj, Anjaneesh Loknath – Avane Srimannarayana; Charan Raj – Kavaludaari; D. Imman – Natasaarvabhowma	Sushin Shyam – Kumbalangi Nights; Vishnu Vijay – Ambili; Shaan Rahman – Love Action Drama, Helen; Jakes Bejoy – Ishq; Gopi Sundar – Uyare
Best Lyricist
Telugu	Tamil
Sri Mani – "Idhe Kadha" from Maharshi; Sirivennela Seetharama Sastry – "Nee Raka Kosam" from Yatra; M. M. Keeravani, K. Rama Krishna, K. Siva Datta – "Rajarshi" from NTR: Kathanayakudu; Krishna Kanth – "Needa Padadhani" from Jersey; Chaitanya Prasad – "Priyathama Priyathama" from Majili	Vivek – "Singapenney" from Bigil; Karthik Netha – "Andhi Malai" from Monster; Madhan Karky – "Sarvam Thaala Mayam" from Sarvam Thaala Mayam; Yugabharathi – "Ellu Vaya Pookalaye" from Asuran; Thamarai – "Kannaana Kanney" from Viswasam
Kannada	Malayalam
Pavan Wadeyar – "Natasaarvabhowma Title Song" from Natasaarvabhowma; Kaviraj – "Marethuhoyithe" from Amar; Yogaraj Bhat – "Yethake Bogase Thumba" from Bell Bottom; A. P. Arjun – "Neene Modalu" from Kiss; V. Sai Sukanya – "Ninna Raja Naanu" from Seetharama Kalyana	Vinayak Sasikumar – "Aaradhike" from Ambili; Anwar Ali – "Cherathukal" from Kumbalangi Nights; B. K. Harinarayanan – "Nee Hima Mazhayayi" from Edakkad Battalion 06; Rafeeq Ahamed – "Nee Mukilo" from Uyare; Suresh Hari – "Pularippoo" from Sathyam Paranja Viswasikkuvo
Best Male Playback Singer
Telugu	Tamil
Anurag Kulkarni – "iSmart Theme" from ISmart Shankar; Shankar Mahadevan – "Padara Padara" from Maharshi; M. L. R. Karthikeyan – "Thandaane Thandaane" from Vinaya Vidheya Rama; Sid Sriram – "Aarerey Manasa" from Falaknuma Das; Sudharshan Ashok – "Prema Vennala" from Chitralahari	Karthik – "Anbe Anbin" from Peranbu; Sid Sriram – "Maruvarthai" from Enai Noki Paayum Thota; Velmurugan – "Kathari Poovazhagi" from Asuran; Anirudh Ravichander – "Kannamma" from Ispade Rajavum Idhaya Raniyum; A. R. Rahman – "Singappenney" from Bigil
Kannada	Malayalam
Kaala Bhairava, Shashank Sheshagiri, Santhosh Venky – "Shivanand" from Yajamana; Armaan Malik – "Ninna Raja Naanu" from Seetharama Kalyana; Vijay Prakash – "Yethake Bogase Thumba" from Bell Bottom; Sanjith Hegde – "Marethu Hoyite" from Amar; Vasuki Vaibhav – "Innunu Bekagida" from Mundina Nildana	K. S. Harisankar – "Pavizha Mazha" from Athiran; Najim Arshad – "Aathmaavile" from Kettyolaanu Ente Malakha; Sid Sriram – "Parayuvan" from Ishq; Sooraj Santhosh – "Aaradhike" from Ambili; Vijay Yesudas – "Nee Mukilo" from Uyare
Best Female Playback Singer
Telugu	Tamil
Chinmayi – "Priyathama Priyathama" from Majili; Mangli – "Bullet Song" from George Reddy; Shreya Ghoshal, Sunidhi Chauhan– "Sye Raa Title Song" from Sye Raa Narasimha Reddy; Mohana Bhogaraju, Hari Teja, Satya Yamini – "Oo Bava" from Prati Roju Pandage; Yamini Ghantasala – "Gira Gira" from Dear Comrade	Saindhavi Prakash – "Helade Keladhe" from Asuran; Shreya Ghoshal – "Anbe Peranbe" from NGK; Padmapriya Raghavan – "Megathoodham" from Airaa; Bombay Jayashri – "Hey Nijame" from Enai Noki Paayum Thotta; Shashaa Tirupati – "Mayilaanjiy" from Sivappu Manjal Pachai
Kannada	Malayalam
Ananya Bhat – "Helade Keladhe" from Geetha; Shreya Ghoshal – "Neene Modalu" from Kiss; Varsha B. Suresh – "Basanni" from Yajamana; Anuradha Bhat – "Hrudaya" from I Love You; Manasa Holla – "Bandanthe Rajakumara" from Bharaate	Prarthana Indrajith – "Thaarapadhamaake" from Helen; Amrutha Suresh – "Minni Minni" from June; Shweta Mohan – "Etho Mazhayil" from Vijay Superum Pournamiyum; Sithara Krishnakumar – "Cherathukal" from Kumbalangi Nights; Soumya Ramakrishnan – "Ee Jaathikkathottam" from Thanneer Mathan Dinangal

=== Critics' choice awards ===
Telugu cinema

- Best Actor – Nani – Jersey
- Best Actress – Rashmika Mandanna – Dear Comrade

Tamil cinema

- Best Actor – Karthi – Kaithi
- Best Actress – Manju Warrier – Asuran

Kannada cinema

- Best Actor – Rakshit Shetty – Avane Srimannarayana
- Best Actress – Rashmika Mandanna – Yajamana

Malayalam cinema

- Best Actor – Nivin Pauly – Moothon
- Best Actress – Nimisha Sajayan – Chola

=== Technical awards ===
- Best Dance Choreographer (Kannada) – Imran Sardhariya – Avane Srimannarayana

=== Generation Next awards ===
- Entertaining film of the Year : F2: Fun and Frustration (received by Anil Ravipudi, Dil Raju and Devi Sri Prasad)
- Entertainer of the Year : Nani – Jersey and Nani's Gang Leader

== 2020 winners and nominees ==
=== Honorary awards ===
- Lifetime Achievement Award — K. Viswanath
- Special Appreciation Award — S. P. Balasubrahmanyam (Note: Awarded posthumously; received by S. P. Charan)

=== Main awards ===
Nominations for the main awards were announced in August 2021, while the awards were presented on 19 September 2021.

==== Film ====
Best Film
Telugu	Tamil
Ala Vaikunthapurramuloo – Geetha Arts, Haarika & Hassine Creations; Sarileru Neekevvaru – Sri Venkateswara Creations, G. Mahesh Babu Entertainment, AK Entertainments; Bheeshma – Sithara Entertainments; Solo Brathuke So Better – Sri Venkateswara Cine Chitra; Uma Maheswara Ugra Roopasya – Arka Media Works, Mahayana Motion Pictures	Soorarai Pottru – Sikhya Entertainment, 2D Entertainment; Kannum Kannum Kollaiyadithaal – Anto Joseph Film Company, Viacom18 Motion Pictures; Ka Pae Ranasingam – KJR Studios; Oh My Kadavule – Happy High Pictures; Kavalthurai Ungal Nanban – BR Talkies Corporation, White Moon Talkies
Kannada	Malayalam
Love Mocktail – Krishna Talkies; Dia – Sri Swarnalatha Productions; Popcorn Monkey Tiger – Studio 18; French Biriyani – PRK Productions; Act 1978 – D Creations	Ayyappanum Koshiyum – Gold Coin Motion Pictures; C U Soon – Fahadh Faasil, Nazriya Nazim; Kappela – Kadhaas Untold; Anjaam Pathiraa – Ashiq Usman Productions; Trance – Anwar Rasheed Entertainments
Best Director
Telugu	Tamil
Trivikram Srinivas – Ala Vaikunthapurramuloo; Anil Ravipudi – Sarileru Neekevvaru; Venky Kudumula – Bheeshma; Venkatesh Maha – Uma Maheswara Ugra Roopasya; Mohana Krishna Indraganti – V	Sudha Kongara – Soorarai Pottru; AR Murugadoss – Darbar; Mysskin – Psycho; R. S. Durai Senthilkumar – Pattas
Kannada	Malayalam
Pannaga Bharana – French Biriyani; K. S. Ashoka – Dia; Darling Krishna – Love Mocktail; Duniya Soori – Popcorn Monkey Tiger; Mansore – Act 1978	Mahesh Narayanan – C U Soon; Anwar Rasheed – Trance; Sachy – Ayyappanum Koshiyum; Midhun Manuel Thomas – Anjaam Pathiraa; Zakariya Mohammed – Halal Love Story
Best Cinematographer
Telugu	Tamil
R. Rathnavelu – Sarileru Neekevvaru; P. S. Vinod – Ala Vaikunthapurramuloo; P. G. Vinda – V; Venkat C. Dilip – Solo Brathuke So Better; Sai Sriram – Bheeshma	Niketh Bommireddy – Soorarai Pottru; Edwin Sakay – Andhaghaaram; Vidhu Ayyanna – Oh My Kadavule; Tanveer Mir – Psycho; Manikantan Krishnamachary – Sethum Aayiram Pon
Kannada	Malayalam
Vishal Vittal, Sourabh Waghmare – Dia; Kharthik Palani – French Biriyani; Sri Crazy Mindz – Love Mocktail; Satya Hegde – Act 1978; Shekar S. – Popcorn Monkey Tiger	Sudeep Elamon – Ayyappanum Koshiyum; Amal Neerad – Trance; Anu Moothedath – Sufiyum Sujatayum; Shyju Khalid – Anjaam Pathiraa; Ajay Menon – Halal Love Story

==== Acting ====
Best Actor
Telugu	Tamil
Allu Arjun – Ala Vaikunthapurramuloo; Mahesh Babu – Sarileru Neekevvaru; Sudheer Babu – V; Nithiin – Bheeshma; Satyadev – Uma Maheswara Ugra Roopasya	Suriya – Soorarai Pottru; Udhayanidhi Stalin – Psycho; Jiiva – Gypsy; RJ Balaji – Mookuthi Amman; Shantanu Bhagyaraj – Paava Kadhaigal
Kannada	Malayalam
Dhananjay – Popcorn Monkey Tiger; Prajwal Devaraj – Gentleman; Danish Sait – French Biriyani; Darling Krishna – Love Mocktail; Raj B. Shetty – Mayabazar 2016	Prithviraj Sukumaran – Ayyappanum Koshiyum; Fahadh Faasil – Trance / C U Soon; Tovino Thomas – Forensic; Kunchacko Boban – Anjaam Pathiraa; Biju Menon – Ayyappanum Koshiyum
Best Actress
Telugu	Tamil
Pooja Hegde – Ala Vaikunthapurramuloo; Rashmika Mandanna – Sarileru Neekevvaru; Nabha Natesh –Solo Brathuke So Better; Chandini Chowdary – Colour Photo; Aishwarya Rajesh – World Famous Lover	Aishwarya Rajesh – Ka Pae Ranasingam; Aparna Balamurali – Soorarai Pottru; Nayantara - Mookuthi Amman; Sneha – Pattas; Keerthy Suresh – Penguin
Kannada	Malayalam
Milana Nagaraj – Love Mocktail; Nivedhitha – Popcorn Monkey Tiger; Kushee Ravi – Dia; Yagna Shetty – Act 1978; Nishvika Naidu – Gentleman	Shobana – Varane Avashyamund; Anna Ben – Kappela; Mamta Mohandas – Forensic; Darshana Rajendran – C U Soon; Anupama Parameswaran – Maniyarayile Ashokan
Best Actor in a Supporting Role
Telugu	Tamil
Murali Sharma – Ala Vaikunthapurramuloo; Rajendra Prasad – Sarileru Neekevvaru; Naresh – Uma Maheswara Ugra Roopasya; Rao Ramesh – Solo Brathuke So Better; Thiruveer – Palasa 1978	Kalidas Jayaram – Paava Kadhaigal; Vijay Sethupathi – Ka Pae Ranasingam; Mohan Babu – Soorarai Pottru; Sarathkumar – Vaanam Kottattum; Gautham Menon – Kannum Kannum Kollaiyadithaal
Kannada	Malayalam
B. Suresha – Act 1978; Dheekshith Shetty – Dia; Sal Yusuf – French Biriyani; Vasishta Simha – Mayabazar 2016; Ravishankar Gowda – Aadyaa	Joju George – Halal Love Story; Sreenath Bhasi – Kappela; Dileesh Pothan – Trance; Roshan Mathew – C U Soon; Anil Nedumangad – Ayyappanum Koshiyum
Best Actress in a Supporting Role
Telugu	Tamil
Tabu – Ala Vaikunthapurramuloo; Vijayashanti – Sarileru Neekevvaru; Anjali – Nishabdham; Sargun Kaur Luthra – Aswathama; Gouri G. Kishan – Jaanu	Radhika – Vaanam Kottattum; Urvashi – Soorarai Pottru; Sai Pallavi – Paava Kadhaigal; Anu Hasan – Putham Pudhu Kaalai; Vani Bhojan – Oh My Kadavule
Kannada	Malayalam
Amrutha Iyengar – Love Mocktail; Aarohi Narayan – Shivaji Surathkal; Anvita Sagar – Maya Kannadi; Shubaraksha – Matte Udbhava; Samyukta Hornad – Arishadvarga	Gowri Nandha – Ayyappanum Koshiyum; Unnimaya Prasad – Anjaam Pathiraa; Urvashi – Varane Avashyamund; Anumol – Paapam Cheyyathavar Kalleriyatte; K. P. A. C. Lalitha – Varane Avashyamund
Best Actor in a Negative Role
Telugu	Tamil
Samuthirakani – Ala Vaikunthapurramuloo; Prakash Raj – Sarileru Neekevvaru; Sunil – Colour Photo; Nani – V; Jisshu Sengupta – Bheeshma	Mime Gopi – Kavalthurai Ungal Nanban; Rajkumar Pitchumani – Psycho; Paresh Rawal – Soorarai Pottru; Naveen Chandra – Pattas; Suniel Shetty – Darbar
Kannada	Malayalam
Rangayana Raghu – Drona; Shivamani – India vs England; Ramesh Pandit – Shivaji Surathkal; Arjun Ramesh – Gentleman; Prakash Raj – Mayabazar 2016	Sharaf U Dheen – Anjaam Pathiraa; Roshan Mathew – Kappela; Siddique – Shylock; Gautham Menon – Trance; Arbaaz Khan – Big Brother
Best Comedian
Telugu	Tamil
Vennela Kishore – Bheeshma; Viva Harsha – Colour Photo; Satya – Solo Brathuke So Better; Sunil – Ala Vaikunthapurramuloo; Saptagiri – Orey Bujjiga	Vivek – Dharala Prabhu; Kaali Venkat – Soorarai Pottru; Yogi Babu – Darbar; Shah Ra – Oh My Kadavule; Urvashi – Mookuthi Amman
Kannada	Malayalam
Rangayana Raghu – French Biriyani; Sadhu Kokila – Mayabazar 2016; Kuri Prathap – Shivarjuna; Govinde Gowda – Naanu Matthu Gunda; Prashanth Siddi – Popcorn Monkey Tiger	Johny Antony – Varane Avashyamund; Dharmajan Bolgatty – Dhamaka; Sunil Sukhada – Paapam Cheyyathavar Kalleriyatte; Sabumon Abdusamad – Ayyappanum Koshiyum; Hareesh Kanaran – Shylock

==== Debut awards ====
Best Debut Actor
Telugu	Tamil
Shiva Kandukuri – Choosi Choodangaane; Sanjay Rao – O Pitta Katha; Ankith Koyya – Johaar; Shravan Reddy – Dirty Hari; Dandamudi Pruthvi – IIT Krishnamurthy	Sriram Karthik – Kanni Maadam; Rajkumar Pitchumani – Psycho; Rakshan – Kannum Kannum Kollaiyadithaal; Sikkil Gurucharan – Putham Pudhu Kaalai; Jaffer Sadiq – Paava Kadhaigal
Kannada	Malayalam
Pruthvi Ambaar – Dia; Aravinnd Iyer – Bheemasena Nalamaharaja; Manju Mandavya – Sri Bharatha Baahubali; Pramod Shetty – Ondu Shikariya Kathe; Prabhu Surya – Gadinadu	Dev Mohan – Sufiyum Sujatayum; Jiji Scaria – The Kung Fu Master; Anand Roshan – Sameer; Sanoop Dinesh – The Kung Fu Master
Best Debut Actress
Telugu	Tamil
Roopa Koduvayur – Uma Maheswara Ugra Roopasya; Varsha Bollamma – Choosi Choodangaane; Noorin Shereef – Oollalla Oollalla; Salony Luthra – Bhanumathi & Ramakrishna; Priyanka Sharma – Savaari	Ritu Varma – Kannum Kannum Kollaiyadithaal; Riya Suman – Seeru; Nattasha Singh – Gypsy; Chaya Devi – Kanni Maadam; Niranjani Ahathian – Kannum Kannum Kollaiyadithaal
Kannada	Malayalam
Sapthami Gowda – Popcorn Monkey Tiger; Ragini Prajwal – Law; Chaithra Rao – Mayabazar 2016; Sarah Harish – Sri Bharatha Baahubali; Siri Prahlad – Ondu Shikariya Kathe	Kalyani Priyadarshan – Varane Avashyamund; India Jarvis – Kilometers and Kilometers; Mirnaa Menon – Big Brother; Thamanna Pramod – Forensic
Best Debut Director
Telugu	Tamil
Karuna Kumar – Palasa 1978; Subbu – Solo Brathuke So Better; Sandeep Raj – Colour Photo; Sailesh Kolanu – HIT: The First Case; Ramana Teja – Aswathama	RJ Balaji, N. J. Saravanan – Mookuthi Amman; Ashwath Marimuthu – Oh My Kadavule; RDM – Kavalthurai Ungal Nanban; Desingh Periyasamy – Kannum Kannum Kollaiyadithaal; P. Virumaandi – Ka Pae Ranasingam
Kannada	Malayalam
Radhakrishna Reddy – Mayabazar 2016; Vinod Poojary – Maya Kannadi; Sachin Shetty – Ondu Shikariya Kathe; Naveen Reddy – Khaki; Arvind Kamath – Arishadvarga	Anoop Sathyan – Varane Avashyamund; Akhil Paul, Anas Khan – Forensic; Rasheed Parakka – Sameer; Anand Menon – Gauthamante Radham; Muhammad Musthafa – Kappela
Best Debut Producer
Telugu	Tamil
Amrutha Productions, Loukya Entertainment – Colour Photo; Sudhas Media – Palasa 1978; Sri Shakty Swaroop Movie Creations – Raahu; Karampuri Kreations, Mic Movies – Pressure Cooker; Third Eye Productions – Madha	BR Talkies Corporation, White Moon Talkies – Kavalthurai Ungal Nanban; Double Meaning Production – Psycho; Rooby Films – Kanni Maadam; GM Film Corporation, 7G Films – Draupathi; Shvedh Group – Lock Up; Happy High Pictures – Oh My Kadavule
Kannada	Malayalam
Anjandri Cine Combines – Shivaji Surathkal; Guru Deshpande Production – Gentleman; Siforia Pictures, King Of Hearts Entertainment – Maya Kannadi; Shetty's Film Factory – Ondu Shikariya Kathe; Kanasu Talkies – Arishadvarga	Kadhaas Untold – Kappela; Wayfarer Films – Varane Avashyamund; Kichappus Entertainments – Gauthamante Radham; Akhil Paul, Anas Khan – Forensic; Papaya Films, Ourhood Movies – Halal Love Story

==== Music ====
Best Music Director
Telugu	Tamil
S. Thaman – Ala Vaikunthapurramuloo; Devi Sri Prasad – Sarileru Neekevvaru; Mahati Swara Sagar – Bheeshma; Amit Trivedi – V; Kaala Bhairava – Colour Photo	G. V. Prakash Kumar – Soorarai Pottru; Ilaiyaraaja – Psycho; Leon James – Oh My Kadavule; Santhosh Narayanan – Gypsy; Masala Coffee – Kannum Kannum Kollaiyadithaal
Kannada	Malayalam
B. Ajaneesh Loknath – Dia; Udit Haritas – Arishadvarga; Raghu Dixit – Love Mocktail; Vasuki Vaibhav – French Biriyani; Charan Raj – Popcorn Monkey Tiger	Jakes Bejoy – Ayyappanum Koshiyum; Sushin Shyam – Kappela; Jackson Vijayan – Trance; Alphons Joseph – Varane Avashyamund; Sooraj S. Kurup – Kilometers and Kilometers
Best Lyricist
Telugu	Tamil
Ramajogayya Sastry – "Butta Bomma" from Ala Vaikunthapurramuloo; Sirivennela Seetharama Sastry – "The Life of Ram" from Jaanu; Kittu Vissapragada – "Tharagathi Gadhi" from Colour Photo; Devi Sri Prasad – "Sarileru Neekevvaru Anthem" from Sarileru Neekevvaru; Srinivasa Mouli – "Emo Emo" from Raahu	Pa. Vijay – "Paarthene" from Mookuthi Amman; Kabilan – "Unna Nenachu" from Psycho; Yugabharathi – "Desaandhiri" from Gypsy; Vivek – "Veyyon Silli" from Soorarai Pottru; Ko Sesha – "Kadhaippoma" from Oh My Kadavule
Kannada	Malayalam
Dhananjay Ranjan – "Soul of Dia" from Dia; Nagarjuna Sharma, Kinnal Raj – "Marali Manasaagide" from Gentleman; Nakul Abhyankar – "Love You Chinna" from Love Mocktail; Raghavendra V. Kamath – "Paarthene" from French Biriyani; Rithwik Kaikini, HanuManKind– "Maadeva" from Popcorn Monkey Tiger	Muhsin Parari – "Sundaranayavane" from Halal Love Story; B. K. Harinarayanan – "Vathikkalu Vellaripravu" from Sufiyum Sujatayum; Vinayak Sasikumar – "Jaalame" from Trance; Santosh Varma – "Mullapoove" from Varane Avashyamund; Rafeeq Ahamed – "Thaalam Poyi" from Ayyappanum Koshiyum
Best Male Playback Singer
Telugu	Tamil
Armaan Malik – "Butta Bomma" from Ala Vaikunthapurramuloo; Shankar Mahadevan – "Sarileru Neekevvaru Anthem" from Sarileru Neekevvaru; Kaala Bhairava – "Tharagathi Gadhi" from Colour Photo; Pradeep Kumar – "The Life of Ram" from Jaanu; Raghu Kunche – "Nakkileesu Golusu" from Palasa 1978	Harish Sivaramakrishnan – "Veyyon Silli" from Soorarai Pottru; Sid Sriram – "Unna Nenachu" from Psycho; Jayaram Balasubramanian – "Paarthene" from Mookuthi Amman; S. P. Balasubrahmanyam – "Chumma Kizhi" from Darbar; Anirudh Ravichander – "Dharala Prabhu" from Dharala Prabhu
Kannada	Malayalam
Sanjith Hegde – "Marali Manasagide" from Gentleman; Nakul Abhyankar – "Janumagale Kaayuve" from Love Mocktail; Vasuki Vaibhav – "Paarthene" from French Biriyani; Sanjith Hegde, Hanumankind, Charan Raj – "Maadeva" from Popcorn Monkey Tiger; Vijay Prakash – "Neene Kaarana" from Aadyaa	Haricharan – "Mullappoove" from Varane Avashyamund; Sid Sriram – "Olu" from Maniyarayile Ashokan; Anand Bhaskar – "Oru Dinam" from Big Brother; Sudeep Palanad – "Nakkileesu Golusu" from Sufiyum Sujatayum; Shahabaz Aman – "Alhamdulillah" from Halal Love Story
Best Female Playback Singer
Telugu	Tamil
Madhu Priya – "He's So Cute" from Sarileru Neekevvaru; Chinmayi – "Oohale" from Jaanu; Spoorthi – "Undipova" from Savaari; Shreya Ghoshal – "Vastunna Vachestunna" from V; Ramya Behara – "Ekaantham" from Colour Photo	Brindha Sivakumar – "Vaa Chellam" from Ponmagal Vandhal; Dhee – "Kaatu Paayale" from Soorarai Pottru; Saindhavi – "Kaayile Aaagasam" from Soorarai Pottru; L. R. Eswari – "Aadi Kuthu" from Mookuthi Amman; Anuradha Sriram – "Pudhu Suriyan" from Pattas
Kannada	Malayalam
Aditi Sagar – "The Bengaluru Song" from French Biriyani; Chinmayi – "Soul of Dia" from Dia; Shreya Sundar Iyer – "Aparchita" from Shivaji Surathkal; Shruthi VS – "Love You Chinna" from Love Mocktail; Siri Ravikumar – "Yava Bimba" from Arishadvarga	Nithya Mammen – "Vathikkalu Vellaripravu" from Sufiyum Sujatayum; Sithara Krishnakumar – "Kadukumanikkoru" from Kappela; Ninjamma – "Kalakkatha" from Ayyappanum Koshiyum; Shweta Mohan – "Kannil" from Kappela; Sangeethaa Sajith – "Thaalam Poyi" from Ayyappanum Koshiyum

=== Critics' choice awards ===
Telugu cinema

- Best Actor – Sudheer Babu – V
- Best Actress – Aishwarya Rajesh – World Famous Lover

Kannada cinema

- Best Actor – Prajwal Devaraj – Gentleman
- Best Actress – Kushee Ravi – Dia

Tamil cinema

- Best Actor – Ashok Selvan – Oh My Kadavule
- Best Actress – Aparna Balamurali – Soorarai Pottru

Malayalam cinema

- Best Actor – Kunchako Boban – Anjaam Pathiraa
- Best Actress – Anna Ben – Kappela

=== Special awards ===
- Special Appreciation Award – Jayaram – Namo

== Superlatives ==
=== 2020 ===
Films with multiple nominations
Nominations	Film
13	Kumbalangi Nights
12	Yajamana
10	Maharshi
10	Majili
9	Asuran
9	Avane Srimannarayana (Note: Received awards in two categories (Critics' choice Best Actress-Kannada and Best Dance Choreographer) directly, for which there are no nominations.)
7	Uyare
7	Jersey (Note: Received awards in two categories (Critics' choice Best Actor-Telugu and Entertainer of the Year directly, for which there are no nominations.)
6	Lucifer
6	Peranbu
6	Kaithi
5	iSmart Shankar
5	Moothon (Note: Received an award in no-nomination category (Crirtics' choice Best Actor-Malayalam))
5	Bigil
5	Super Deluxe
4	Oh! Baby
4	Gaddalakonda Ganesh
4	June
4	Viswasam
3	Pailwaan
3	Dorasaani
3	Mallesham
3	Prati Roju Pandage
3	Falaknuma Das
3	Mathu Vadalara
3	Chitralahari
3	Sye Raa Narasimha Reddy
3	Jallikattu
3	Unda
3	Helen
3	Love Action Drama
3	Ishq
3	Thanneer Mathan Dinangal
3	House Owner
3	Comali
2	Vinaya Vidheya Rama
2	Nani's Gang Leader
2	Rajdooth
2	Agent Sai Srinivasa Athreya
2	Brochevarevarura
2	F2: Fun and Frustration
2	Dear Comrade
2	Ambili
2	Mamangam
2	Vijay Superum Pournamiyum
2	Driving Licence
2	Namma Veettu Pillai
2	Oththa Seruppu Size 7
2	Adithya Varma
2	Petta
2	Jiivi
2	Jackpot
2	To Let
2	Aadai

Films with multiple awards
Awards	Film
8	Yajamana
6	Asuran
5	Maharshi
5	Lucifer
4	Kaithi
3	Jersey
2	Oh! Baby
2	Comali
2	Viswasam
2	Avane Srimannarayana
2	Moothon

== Presenters ==
=== 2020 ===
Award	Presenter
Best Cinematographer – Telugu	Pavan Wadiyar; Tanya Hope
Best Lyricist – Telugu	Armaan Malik; Shubra Aiyappa
Best Female Playback Singer – Telugu	Jeevitha
Best Male Playback Singer – Telugu	Taran Adarsh
Best Music Director – Telugu	P. P. Reddy; Ashika Ranganath
Best Supporting Actor – Telugu	Rajkumar; Manchu Lakshmi
Best Supporting Actress – Telugu	Ravindra Reddy; Poornima Bhagyaraj
Best Comedian – Telugu	Devi Sri Prasad; Faria Abdullah
Best Actor in a Negative Role – Telugu	Venkatesh; Lakshmi Rai
Best Debut Director – Telugu	Rockline Venkatesh; Vijayalakshmi Singh
Best Debut Producer – Telugu	P. Sai Kumar; Nidhi Subbaiah
Best Female Debut – Telugu	Shanvi Srivastava; Balu Chowdary
Best Male Debut – Telugu	Neeraj Kumar; Radhika Sarathkumar
Entertaining Film of the Year	Vamshi Paidipally; Sumalatha; Brinda Prasad
Best Director – Telugu	Suhasini Maniratnam
Best Film – Telugu	Sumalatha
Entertainer of the Year	Vamshi Paidipally; Sumalatha; Brinda Prasad
Critics Choice Best Actress – Telugu	Suhasini Maniratnam
Critics Choice Best Actor – Telugu	Murali Mohan
Best Actress – Telugu	Suhasini Maniratnam
Best Actor – Telugu	Joginapally Santosh Kumar; Radhika Sarathkumar
Lifetime Achievement Award	Vamshi Paidipally; Sumalatha; Brinda Prasad
