= Unda (film) =

2019 film by Khalid Rahman

- Theatrical release poster
- Directed by: Khalid Rahman
- Screenplay by: Harshad
- Story by: Khalid Rahman
- Produced by: Krishnan Sethukumar
- Starring: Mammootty; Easwari Rao; Ranjith; Shine Tom Chacko; Arjun Ashokan; Jacob Gregory
- Cinematography: Sajith Purushan
- Edited by: Nishadh Yusuf
- Music by: Prashant Pillai
- Production companies: Moviee Mill; Gemini Studios
- Distributed by: Gemini Studios
- Release date: 14 June 2019 (India)
- Running time: 130 minutes
- Country: India
- Language: Malayalam
- Budget: ₹8–12 crore (Note: Surendhar of Firstpost estimates the film's budget as ₹8 crore, whereas Mathrubhumi says that ₹12 crore was spent to produce the film.)

Unda (transl. Bullet) is a 2019 Indian Malayalam-language black comedy film directed by Khalid Rahman with a screenplay by Harshad based on a story by Rahman. Krishnan Sethukumar produced the film for Moviee Mill and Gemini Studios. The film stars Mammootty, Shine Tom Chacko, Jacob Gregory and Arjun Ashokan. Sajith Purushan was the film's cinematographer, and Prashant Pillai composed the music.

The story is based on an incident that occurred during the 2014 Lok Sabha election, when a nine-man police unit from Kerala was sent to a Naxalite-affected area of Chhattisgarh as part of election duty with insufficient ammunition. Deceived by the calm and quiet on their first day, the police let their guard down when a shootout the next day made them aware of the dangers they were about to face. In their initial rush of excitement, they fired almost all of the very limited number of bullets they had brought with them. To conduct the elections peacefully with only eight bullets left becomes a humongous task ahead of them.

Unda’s development began in 2014, when Rahman spotted an article featured in the Malayala Manorama daily. The article was about a police unit from Kerala posted as part of election duty in a Maoist affected area in Chhattisgarh without sufficient ammunition. After research, Harshad wrote the screenplay with Rahman in 2016. Eventually, Sethukumar replaced Anwar Rasheed, who was its initial financier, as the producer of the film. The title was announced on 21 September 2018 and production commenced from October. Principal photography began by the second week of October in Kasaragod and shooting was completed on 23 March 2019 in Chhattisgarh.

The film was released in India on 14 June 2019 and globally on 19 June. Upon release, the film met with widespread critical acclaim. The performances of its cast, direction and screenplay were praised by critics. It grossed over ₹20 crore worldwide in 10 days at the box office and ₹30 crore in its final run and became a commercial success. The film was screened at the 24th International Film Festival of Kerala 2019 under the section 'Malayalam Cinema Today'. It was included in The Hindu's top 25 Malayalam films of the decade.

== Plot ==
Police units from the Kerala Police camp in Idukki are preparing for election duty in other states. They are briefed by their senior officer Sam J. Mathan that they will be going to Chhattisgarh, Madhya Pradesh and Jharkhand for forty days. He emphasizes that they should use ammunition only when necessary. A unit under CI Mathews Anthony arrives in Bastar at Chhattisgarh, which is one of the most dangerous parts of the Maoist affected red belt in India. Due to the unavailability of accommodations, the unit are forced to find shelter in their respective polling booths until election day. On their way to the booths, they split into three teams with Sub Inspector Manikandan leading one. That night, they receive a message warning of a likely Maoist attack. Though they become alert with loaded guns, no attack happens.

The next day morning, ITBP Commandant Dakota Akanito finds the team irresponsible and informs them of the seriousness of their duty by showing them footage of people killed during Maoist attacks in the past. He is surprised to learn that the team has not been provided with sufficient bullets and ammunition by the State Government. After realizing the threat of their duty, Mani speaks to Mathews over phone and informs him what the ITBP commandant said. Mathews tells him that the state government had said that providing ammunition is the responsibility of the state government in Chhattisgarh. The next day night, the team encounters with a light shootout by the Maoists and fires back. Later, the ITBP officers inform them that some Maoists were chased by them and they unknowingly fired back bullets seeing the lights and the remaining were fire crackers. The ashamed team realizes that they wasted bullets and now only eight bullets remain. The next day, Mani goes to meet Mathews and informs him that their situation is in danger without sufficient ammunition.

Some in the team are angry at Mani as they felt that he hadn't done anything during the previous day's firing on purpose. Mani realizing that something has to be done immediately to stay alive, sends some pictures to his friends in Kerala of the team laying on floor without any facilities and making a note of their current situation. Back in Kerala after receiving his message, the news gets featured on a newspaper and Sam J. Mathan is forced to take action and quickly makes arrangement to send more bullets and ammunition for the team. Two cops Rajan and Balan continue their journey in a train from Kerala to Chhattisgarh with the necessary bullets and ammunition that has been allotted. Meantime, Unnikrishnan accompanied by Biju Kumar, without informing Mani gets to a place in the village to buy liquor. On their way back, Unnikrishnan starts to tease Biju Kumar who belongs to the adivasi community. Biju Kumar who has been hearing the abuses repeatedly loses control and hits Unnikrishnan. They end the fight when they spot a truck approaching from the distance, which suddenly explodes passing over a land mine.

Both of them survive with minor injuries. That night, Biju Kumar informs the others in the presence of Mani that he would want to quit his job because he cannot withstand such criticism anymore. Later that night, Rajan and Balan find the box carrying the bullets in the train missing and stand furious without knowing what to do next. On the day of the election, Mathews informs them that both the bullets and the people assigned to carry it have been missing. Mani reaches the booth and learns that a candidate along with his goons had barged into the booth and had created a ruckus by vote rigging. He slaps a goon who tries to destroy the EVM and asks the rest of them to leave. Sometime later, they see the goons approaching in a larger number. Mani tells his team that they would have to conduct the election peacefully no matter how with only the eight bullets left. Due to the shortage of ammunition he instructs his team to use their lathis and shields in which they are very experienced. Mani and his team defeat the goons and complete their election assignment. Then, a monkey is shown jumping over the lost box of bullets by a railway track.

== Cast ==
- Mammootty as S. I. Manikandan C. P. / Mani, armed police battalion
- Ranjith as C. I. Mathews Anthony
- Dileesh Pothan as C. I. Mathukutty J.
- Shine Tom Chacko as HDR Jojo Samson
- Arjun Ashokan as PC Gireesh T. P.
- Kalabhavan Shajohn as SP Sam J. Mathen IPS, Commandant, Armed Police Battalion
- Bhagwan Tiwari as ITBP officer Kapil Dev
- Omkar Das Manikpuri as Kunalchand
- Jacob Gregory as PC Varghese Kuruvila / Smooth
- Rony David as PC Aji Peter
- Lukman Avaran as PC Biju Kumar
- Gokulan as PC Gokulan Balachandran
- Abhiram Radhakrishnan as PC Unni Krishnan A.
- Noushad Bombay as PC Noushad Ali
- Chien Ho Liao as ITBP Commandant Dakota Akanito
- Shaheen Ahamed as ITBP officer Vincent James
- B. Shantanu as Zammindar
- Harshad as person in the train
- Sohan Seenulal as Police officer

=== Cameo appearances ===
- Asif Ali as S. I. Rajan
- Vinay Forrt S. I. Balan
- Easwari Rao as Lalitha, Mani's wife
- Sudhi Koppa as Police officer

== Production ==
=== Development ===
Unda is based on a 2014 newspaper article in the Malayala Manorama daily. In 2014, Rahman had noticed an article pointing out the situation of a unit of policemen from Kerala sent to Chhattisgarh for duty during the 2014 Lok Sabha election. It reported that the unit, posted in an area with rampant Maoist activity, were not provided with sufficient ammunition. Rahman found a photograph showing a bunch of cops crammed into a tiny room, sleeping on the floor holding their rifles close to their chest, haunting. After realizing that the article had a film subject in it, Rahman met some of the police officers in person to develop the film's basic storyline. The film had to be set outside Kerala and required to be made on a large canvas, Rahman in the meantime worked on another film, Anuraga Karikkin Vellam (2016), which became his directorial debut. It was Anwar Rasheed who suggested Harshad to Rahman for writing Unda’s screenplay. In 2016, Rahman and Harshad started to write Unda’s screenplay. Initially, Harshad had developed a one-liner based on all the details collected by Rahman. Later, both of them along with cinematographer Jimshi and their assistants had traveled to Bastar to collect some more details. In an interview with The Hindu on the challenges he faced, Rahman said: “I had only the newspaper article as a reference. It was not easy to meet the policemen who went there on duty because they are not supposed to reveal anything about their official work. After a report came out, a directive was issued to stop the men from revealing anything more about their assignment. So, no reports came out after that. Thus, it was quite a task to collect the details.” Though Rahman planned to make it as a commercial film, 80% of the script was written based on the real incidents.

In early November 2017, Mammootty was reported as the star of the film, with Anwar Rasheed financing. Because of the delay and extension in filming Trance, Rasheed left Unda amicably and Krishnan Sethukumar replaced him as producer. Prominent Chennai based film studio Gemini Film Circuit marked their return into production after a long time by co-producing and distributing Unda. Rahman's brother Jimshi Khalid was initially announced as the film's cinematographer and filming was planned to start in September 2018. Rahman and Jimshi visited North Indian states like Chhattisgarh and Jharkhand in search of filming locations. Prashant Pillai was signed as the film's composer and Bollywood action director Sham Kaushal was the film's stunt coordinator. Although it was reported in May 2018 that Jimshi Khalid would be the film's cinematographer, Gavemic U. Ary replaced him. Later, Sajith Purushan was credited as the film's cinematographer in the first look poster and replaced Gavemic for unknown reasons.

=== Title ===
Even before its official announcement, medias had reported speculations about the title of the film to be Unda. On 21 September 2018, Mammootty shared a poster through his Facebook handle revealing the title "Unda", meaning Bullet in Malayalam. Due to its unique title, numerous trolls and negative comments had appeared across social media platforms post announcement. When asked about the title given for the film, Rahman said that the film is very much connected to a bullet and it was put just for its attractive point of view. According to him, a film's title is important to a film as much as its story and the title given here is very much connected to the film's storyline. He also said that one could only understand its relevance after watching the film. In an interview with Mathrubhumi, Mammootty said that the title communicates what is being discussed in the film and has been designed resembling a “piercing bullet”.

=== Casting ===
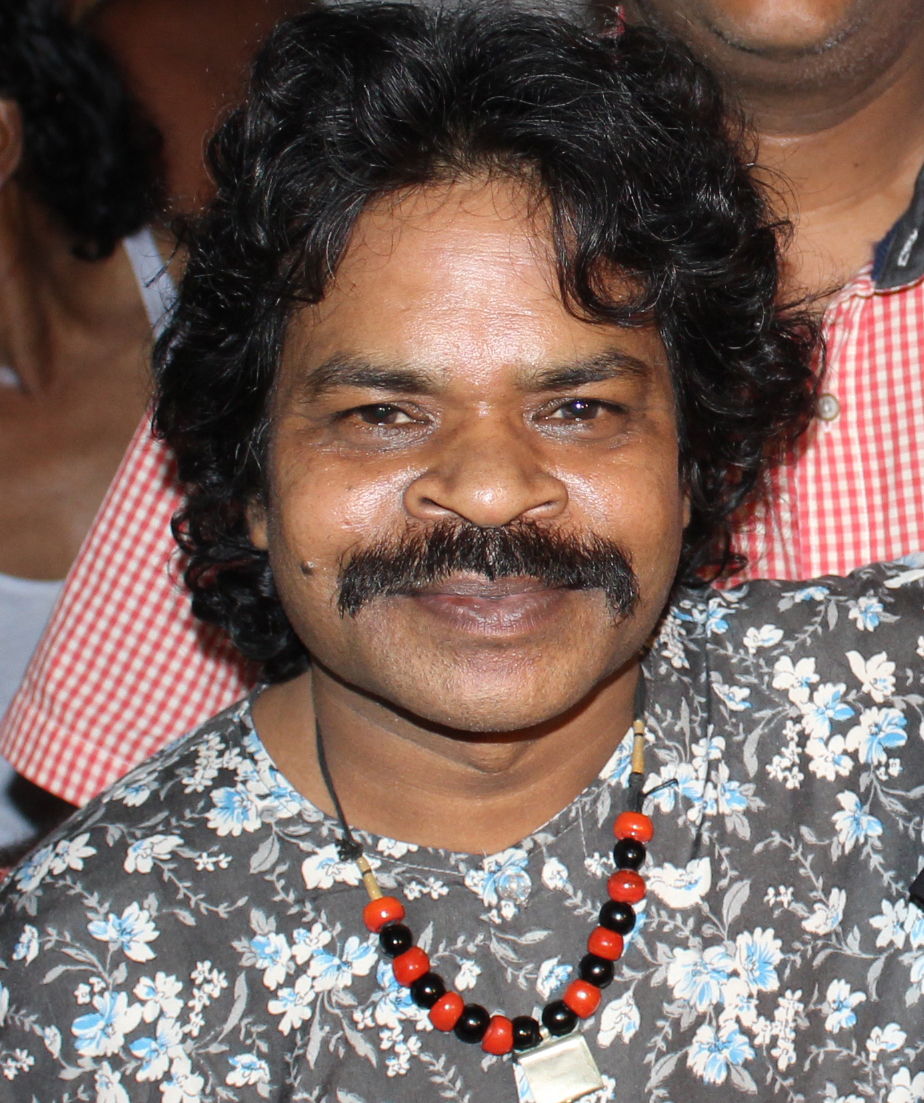
The film was Manikpuri's debut in Malayalam cinema

Once the idea was worked out Rahman had taken in mind a reference character from real life. The particular character's style and inputs were used while writing the script. He wanted Mammootty to play the lead as he felt that to execute such a real life character in the film it demanded an experienced actor. They first narrated the story to him in 2018 and were sure that he would be ready to do the film. Mammootty, calling it a “novel subject”, agreed to appear in the film. Unda wasn't planned as a “superstar film” and Rahman wanted Mammootty's character Manikandan to look as a simple police officer without any supernatural elements to showcase heroism. The cast in the storyline required ten central characters. Apart from Mammootty's character sub inspector Manikandan C. P., there are nine policemen. Sudhi Koppa was cast as PC Aji Peter initially, who later suggested Rony David to Rahman for his role as he had other commitments. Asif Ali who was the lead in Rahman's debut film Anuraga Karikkin Vellam (2016), agreed to do a brief cameo appearance when informed by him. Gokulan, Abhiram Radhakrishnan, Lukman and Noushad who had earlier known and worked with Rahman while he was an assistant and associate director in films were cast to play the roles of four policemen. To highlight the downtrodden adivasi community, Rahman and Harshad created a character PC Biju Kumar (played by Lukman) who is a policeman from the adivasi community. Unda’s storyline did not require a heroine. “There are female actors in the film but their presence on screen is limited. For instance, the actor playing Manikandan’s wife is there in one or two sequences only”, said Rahman. After watching Peepli Live (2010), Rahman invited Bollywood actor Omkar Das Manikpuri to appear in a major role in the film, for which he agreed. Later in 2018, it was reported that actors Shine Tom Chacko, Jacob Gregory, Arjun Ashokan and Dileesh Pothan along with Bollywood actors Bhagwan Tiwari and Chien Ho Liao were officially added to the cast.

=== Filming ===
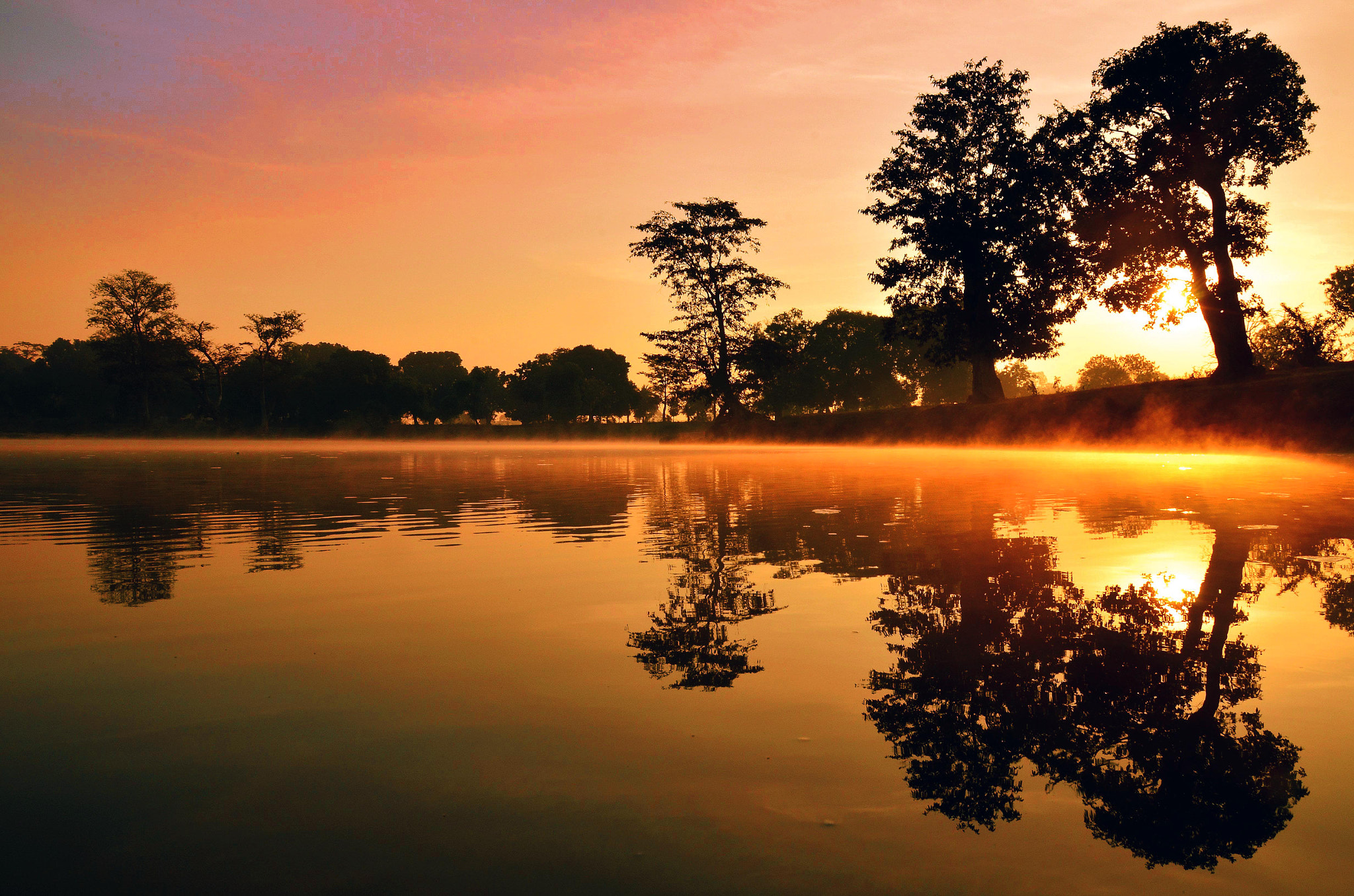
The portions of Chhattisgarh were filmed within the Bastar district

Principal photography began by the second week of October 2018, in the Karadka Reserve Forest, situated in the Kasaragod district of Kerala. As part of setting up the location, gravel laid roads was constructed in the forest area. Filming was initially planned as a single schedule for 60 days and apart from Kasaragod, Chhattisgarh and Mangalore were also major filming locations. After wrapping up the first schedule in Kasaragod, the team had a few weeks break. On 19 February 2019, the second schedule of filming commenced in Wayanad and it took 3 weeks to wrap up. During a schedule break Rahman had also worked as an assistant director in the film Thamaasha (2019). A brief schedule of filming had also taken place in Kannur, Mysore, Nilambur, and Viyyoor in Thrissur. The train shots were filmed in the Nilambur–Shoranur line. The final filming in Chhattisgarh, had begun in early March 2019. Unda being the first Malayalam film to be shot in the locale, it was expected to be interesting to see how it would utilise the premise. As the filming location inside the forests of Bastar had been affected by Maoist attacks, the actors had a fear within and were cautious while shooting. The filming in Chhattisgarh was wrapped up on 23 March 2019. The entire filming was completed in 57 days, and was made on a budget of ₹8—12 crore.

Stunt coordinator Sham Kaushal choreographed “very realistic” fight sequences for the film. To set up a major action sequence in the climax portions of the film Kaushal did not rely on dupes or special effects: “All the fights are done by Mammootty himself. This is not a larger-than-life story; it’s honest with realistic situations. Naturally, this demanded real action”. Stating that the climax sequence for Unda was shot in its final stage, he said: “We did most of it in sequence as per written in the script, but then we also had to improvise a few portions while keeping the basic structure intact.” According to costume designer Mashar Hamsa, the costumes designed for each policeman had to stand out. Usually policemen in stations are seen wearing khakis of different shades as they buy it from different shops and at different times, the same pattern was followed in the film. Hamsa used uniforms purchased on different rates and from different shops, linking their costumes to their character. Talking in an interview with Mathrubhumi about the fight sequences, Mammootty said that they haven't overdone any action and it was just placed to show self-defense. The film was shot in sync sound and it worried the actors. Some found it difficult as they had to properly learn and deliver dialogues during shoot. Initially, there was no sync sound in the first 2–3 days of shoot, but later Mammootty suggested to go with sync sound as he felt it was an unnecessary struggle to recreate all the dialogues later in the dubbing studio.

== Soundtrack ==
Unda: Original Motion Picture Soundtrack

Soundtrack album by Prashant Pillai
- Released: 24 May 2019
- Venues: Kochi, Chennai
- Studios: My Studio, Kochi
- Genre: Feature Film Soundtrack
- Length: 11:36
- Languages: Hindi; Malayalam
- Label: Goodwill Entertainments

Prashant Pillai chronology
Padayottam (2018)	Unda (2019)	Jallikkattu (2019)

Prashant Pillai composed the soundtrack of Unda. The soundtrack album consists of three tracks. The lyrics are written by Hussain Haidry and Kirendra Yadav. The soundtrack was released by Goodwill Entertainments on 24 May 2019. Kirendra Yadav, various folk singers from Bastar and Pillai himself contributed vocals to the soundtrack. Rahman wanted the film's score to resemble Bastar's indigenous music. A year before filming, Rahman along with Pillai and his team visited the region's villages and recorded major portions of the soundtrack. The locals who sang in the film included children, youngsters and old men and women.

=== Track listing ===
Unda: Original Motion Picture Soundtrack
No.	Title	Lyrics	Singer(s)	Length
1.	"Bastar Awaits"	Kirendra Yadav	various folk singers from Bastar	02:28
2.	"Badar Garaj – A Beautiful Bastar"	Kirendra Yadav	Kirendra Yadav	03:46
3.	"Kaara Kaara – The Journey Continues"	Hussain Haidry	Prashant Pillai	05:22
Total length:				11:36

== Themes ==
In the film, the title Unda represents both the literal meaning for bullets, and also the colloquial representation of nothingness. According to Manoj Kumar R. of the Indian Express, Unda deals with multiple hard-hitting themes like human right violations, moral crisis, ethnic discrimination and government's indifference to its own people; he feels that the indigenous people of Bastar are exploited and robbed of their basic rights and are chased away from their own land. He finds that most part of the film deals with such heavy themes in a light way. Manoj noted in the film that there are no fiery speeches or easy advice about bravery or nationalism but just simple powerful lines borne out of fear and the need to survive.

Adila Matra of The Quint felt the film's theme to be similar to that of Newton (2017), but stated that the outsider's view is what lends Unda a shot in the arm. According to her, the film's aim was to try and document the differences between the North and the South – the politics, the culture and the people. Matra noted that the film reveals the cultural and political shock of Kerala police on one side, on the other it shows the stark contrast in their perception of patriotism. Unda also makes a commentary on the administration and the bureaucracy highlighting the gap between the workforce and the administration. In her review for Silverscreen.in, Aswathy Gopalakrishnan pointed out that Rahman turns the trunk box of ammunition that the Kerala government promises to send to Chhattisgarh into a fine metaphor for the disjointed and partly dysfunctional system that holds India together. Navamy Sudhish of The Hindu felt that the director treated the audience to an immensely realistic narrative, part satiric and part poignant. In the film Mammootty plays a very human character and redefines the idea of manliness in display of weakness. According to writer Harshad, he had to address the subject of insurgency a little because it was part of the setting and wanted to talk about the minority community who live around the booth, the chief location of the film, who are caught in this war for no fault of theirs.

== Marketing ==
The title of the film was announced by Mammootty on 21 September 2018 with a poster shared on Facebook. On the morning of 15 April 2019, Mammootty revealed the first look poster of the film on the occasion of the Hindu festival Vishu through his social media pages. The poster featured Mammootty's character sub-inspector Mani and a group of policemen trying to fix a broken down truck. It was Mammootty who insisted to release such a poster where equal prominence was given to each of the supporting cast members. On 4 May 2019, the official marketing campaign of the film commenced by releasing 14 character posters starting from Shine Tom Chacko. The New Indian Express reported that the teaser of the film will be released and screened in Kerala theatres on 12 April along with the Mammootty starrer Madhura Raja, but wasn't confirmed. On 16 May 2019, Mammootty and Mohanlal released a 40-second teaser on YouTube featuring Mammootty's character Manikandan teaching a troop of policemen how to fire a gun. The teaser recorded more than one million views within 24 hours. A making video featuring the poster photo shoot was released by Mammootty on 24 May through social media platforms. Trailer of the film was released on the occasion of Eid al-Fitr, on 5 June 2019 on YouTube. The Indian Express wrote, "Judging by the trailer, Unda seems to be an uplifting film revolving around a group of policemen."

== Release ==
=== Theatrical ===
Unda was initially planned for release in January 2019. Later, it was postponed and was said to be released during the festival of Eid al-Fitr 2019. The release date was again postponed to June 14 due to legal trouble over its filming in a reserve forest without permission and unfinished post-production works. The 130 minute long film cleared censoring by the Central Board of Film Certification and was given a "U" certificate on 12 June with no cuts. The film was released in 161 theatres in Kerala on 14 June. The film was released in the United Arab Emirates and Gulf Cooperation Council on 19 June 2019 and was shown in 55 screens and 37 screens in UAE and GCC, respectively. Unda became Mammootty’s first film and the second Malayalam film after Lucifer to get released in Saudi Arabia. Unda was released in the United States, Asia-Pacific, New Zealand, Singapore, Australia, South Africa, Nigeria and Kenya on 20 June 2019. It also screened at the 24th International Film Festival of Kerala 2019 under the section 'Malayalam Cinema Today'.

=== Home media ===
Unda was released for digital download on 2 August 2019, available as VOD on Amazon Prime Video in Malayalam. The film's television broadcasting right was purchased by Asianet, it premiered on TV on 10 September 2019, during the festival time of Onam in Kerala.

== Reception ==
=== Box office ===
The film crossed the ₹10 crore mark from Kerala box office in five days and grossed ₹11.9 crore in six days. By collecting ₹1.59 crore (as of 21 June) from the rest-of-India territories, Unda became the sixth highest-grossing Malayalam film of 2019 in the rest-of-India territories after Lucifer, Kumbalangi Nights, Uyare, Virus and Madhura Raja. It grossed over ₹20 crore worldwide in 10 days, with ₹14.7 crore from Kerala alone.

The film grossed $27,975 in two weeks from United States and collected a total of $47,564 in three weeks. In the United Arab Emirates (UAE), the film grossed $443,859 in the opening weekend (20 – 23 June) becoming the fourth best opener and the fifth best grossing film of that weekend (behind Toy Story 4, Men in Black: International, Kabir Singh and Aladdin). In the opening weekend, the film grossed $6,404 from Australia and $559 from New Zealand (and $2,248 in two weeks). The film collected a total of ₹6.8 crore from the UAE-GCC in ten days.

=== Critical response ===
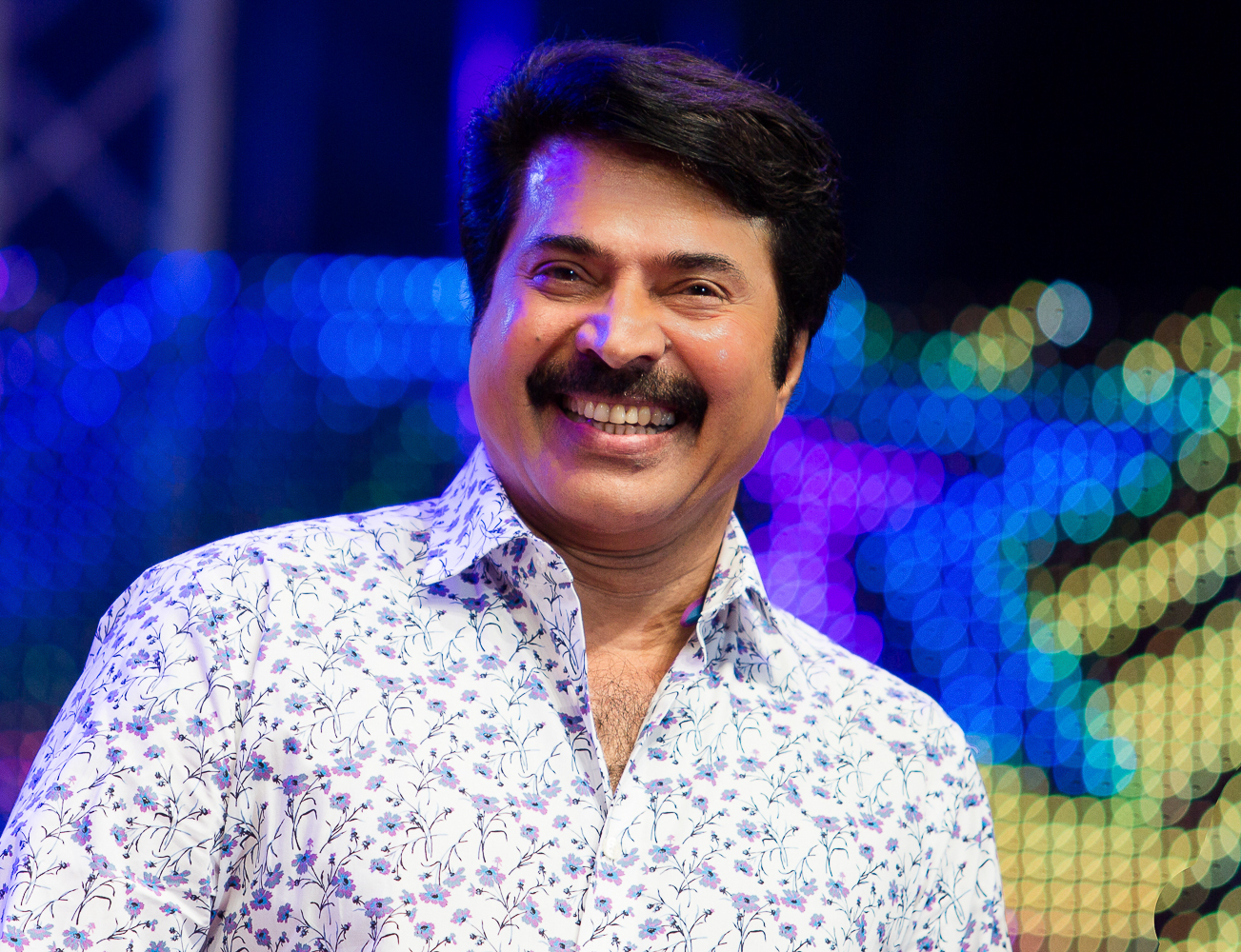
Mammootty attracted positive reviews for his performance

Manoj Kumar R. of the Indian Express gave the film a full five star rating and wrote: "Unda is one of the best-written films in Malayalam cinema. It is not just a film about a group of naive policemen from Kerala grappling with the challenges of an unknown territory." He added: "The actual story lies in the subtext, which never stops reminding us about the innate flaw of the human race: one tries to assume a sense of superiority by dominating or looking down on the other." Malayala Manorama rated it 4 out of 5 stars and gave the verdict: "Potent film-making, poignant message." The reviewer praised Pillai's music: "Prashant Pillai's music captures the essence of the social upheaval in the hinterland of alienation." He also added: "The realistic approach of the film-makers, though, had to give way for some unrealistic action scenes, but this could well be pardoned." Shekhar H. Hooli of the International Business Times appreciated Mammootty's performance and wrote: "As a police officer, Mammootty has delivered a brilliant performance, which is the highlight of Unda." Shekhar also praised the film's technical aspects: "Unda has decent production value and Prashant Pillai's background score, Sajith Purushan's beautiful picturisation, action, dialogues and Nishad Yusuf's editing are the attractions on the technical front, according to the audience."

Directors Ranjith Sankar and Arun Gopy were all positive about the film, particularly praising Mammootty's performance, its theme and its making. National Award-winning scriptwriter Sajeev Pazhoor called Unda an “Indian film.” After watching a special screening of the film, Kerala State Police Chief Lokanath Behera praised its script, making and commented “very realistic.” Deepa Antony of The Times of India awarded 4 in a scale of 5 and commented: "Unda is an unbridled entertainer with a heart that makes you root for the Kerala Police. It opens your eyes to the gap between the administration, the bureaucracy, and the working force." She praised Mammootty's performance and Rahman's direction: "After a long, long, time Mammootty feels like a real man in flesh and blood than a demi-god, and that's thanks to some solid writing, directing, and of course the actor's merit." Rating 4 out of 5 stars, Anna M. M. Vetticad of Firstpost wrote: "2019 is The Year of Mammootty, this sweet-sad-funny ode to the Kerala Police seals the deal." She praised Rahman's direction: "Khalidh Rahman steers clear of the formulae that such films usually resort to. He does not, for instance, assign a romance per cop, nor give any of them elaborate schmaltzy back stories, yet we get to know most of them well through the work dynamic between them, snatches of their repartee with each other and the occasional telephone call back home."

Baradwaj Rangan noted that the film's story despite being about a Malayali posse, looks at all Indians. He praised Mammootty's performance, saying the actor "looks past his numerous cop roles from the past and finds a tender new side to the man-in-khaki archetype." The Week rated the movie 4 out of 5 stating: "This Mammootty-starrer is a police story with a difference." Also praising the music and cinematography, the review concluded: "There's a guaranteed goosebump moment in the film, but it's not Mammootty who gets the cheers and whistles!" Navamy Sudhish of The Hindu said it was "hitting the target, fair and square" and added "Khalid Rahman’s ‘Unda’ is an immensely realistic narrative, part satiric and part poignant." She also praised its script written by Rahman and Harshad: "The film has a very thin storyline, but the screenplay adds layers to it, elevating it to a brilliant and full-bodied narrative. The script in its contours holds a whole lot of subtlety, but there is no extravagant or larger-than-life attempt at entertaining or self-expression. The script penned by Khalid Rahman and Harshad weaves a vibe so fluid that you are easily sucked into its easy spontaneity." Sify felt that Unda was "a compelling ride that will appeal to those who take movies seriously." Praising Mammootty's acting, the review concluded: "It is Mammootty who unleashes a brilliant display of subtle acting. He is not really healthy, not much confident and is scared, as he gets into the shoes of the character of Mani sir. He needs to be applauded for his dedicated performance ... If you are a fan of Mammootty, here is one of his finest performances. Watch this one!" Neelima Menon wrote for HuffPost that "Mammootty’s Kind, Vulnerable Policeman Is A Delight." Menon praised the performances of Mammootty and others in the cast and the film's music and cinematography: "Unda really floats on a thin storyline. But it’s how Khalid crafts the scenes, drizzling them with humour, satire, suspense (aided by some terrific background score by Prashant Pillai) and sensitivity, that makes it a compelling watch." In October 2019, listing the biggest icons of the south film industry Vogue India called Mammootty “the master” and wrote: "Unda turned out to be a glorious comeback vehicle, where audiences rediscovered his signature near-invisible performance cred with the role of a police officer spurred into action in Naxal-heavy Chhattisgarh." HuffPost listed Unda among the 10 best Malayalam films of 2019 and Mammootty's performance among the 14 best performances in Malayalam cinema this decade. The film was listed among the best Indian films of 2019 by The Quint and wrote that "Director Khalid Rahman smartly highlights the general apathy of the system against the very tool they use to repress and suppress common people. Unda, while it doesn't offer any hope, gives the audience some terrific acting and some brilliant writing." The Hindu included Unda in its list of the 25 best Malayalam films of the decade. The Week listed the film among the 5 finest movies of the year. National Herald mentioned the film in its list comprising the low-budget films having high content and wrote that its "amazing treatment of the subject makes a subtle comment on fear, casteism, politics and law and order machinery."

=== Accolades ===
Ceremony	Category	Nominee	Result	Ref.
CPC Cine Awards 2019	Best Actor in a Lead Role	Mammootty	Nominated	
CPC Cine Awards 2019	Best Actor in a Character Role	Shine Tom Chacko	Nominated	
CPC Cine Awards 2019	Best Actor in a Character Role	Lukman	Nominated	
CPC Cine Awards 2019	Best Actor in a Character Role	Arjun Ashokan	Nominated	
CPC Cine Awards 2019	Best Movie	Unda	Nominated	
CPC Cine Awards 2019	Best Director	Khalid Rahman	Nominated	
CPC Cine Awards 2019	Best Cinematographer	Sajith Purushan	Nominated	
CPC Cine Awards 2019	Best Scriptwriter	Harshad	Nominated	
CPC Cine Awards 2019	Best Background Score	Prashant Pillai	Nominated	
Chitrabhumi-Mathrubhumi online survey	Best Actor of 2019	Mammootty	Won	
Chitrabhumi-Mathrubhumi online survey	Best Film of 2019	Unda	Won	

== Controversy ==
A petition was filed against the film crew by Angels Nair, general secretary of Animal Legal Force Integration, Ernakulam for shooting in the Mulleria reserve forest and causing environmental damage. According to the petitioner, during the film's shoot they had inflicted damage on the forest's microflora and microfauna, when they resorted to dumping of gravel that made the area marshy. In an interview to The Times of India, director Khalid Rahman responded saying, “I admit that we disturbed the ecosystem while shooting and camping there. This was noticed by a few environmental activists and they filed a genuine case against us.” On 26 June 2019, the Kerala High Court directed the Central Government to initiate appropriate action against the film crew and the officials who granted permission for the filming. Shortly after the release of the film, Khalid Rahman responded to his followers through stories on Instagram that he wasn't satisfied with the film and its climax. He also noted that there were many reasons for not being satisfied.

During the film's first screening at the 24th International Film Festival of Kerala 2019 the crew protested against The Citizenship (Amendment) Bill, 2019 and the National Register of Citizens of India by displaying banners onstage.
