= Gantumoote =

2019 Kannada film

- Theatrical release poster
- Directed by: Roopa Rao
- Written by: Roopa Rao
- Produced by: Roopa Rao; Sahadev Kelvadi
- Starring: Teju Belawadi; Nischith Korodi
- Cinematography: Sahadev Kelvadi
- Edited by: Pradeep Nayak
- Music by: Aparajith Sris
- Production company: Ameyukti Studios
- Release date: 18 October 2019
- Running time: 1:55:00
- Country: India
- Language: Kannada

Gantumoote (transl. Baggage) is a 2019 Indian Kannada language coming of age drama film written and directed by Roopa Rao and produced by Rao and Sahadev Kelvadi. Having previously directed short films and web series', this is Rao's debut feature film. Set in the 90s in Bangalore, this film follows the life of Meera, a high school teenager and her first tryst with love and the story that ensues. It had its world premiere in New York Indian Film Festival on May 11, 2019, and later released in India on October 18, 2019, and in USA on November 8, 2019.

Gantumoote won the Best Screenplay Award at the New York Indian Film Festival, being the first Kannada film to do so. It received critical acclaim upon release.

== Plot ==
An intense coming off age, high school drama set in Bangalore in the 1990s (Pre-Internet Era). A relatable story of a sixteen-year-old girl and her subtle journey from the life that she thinks exists just like in the movies to the actual life that unravels to her. A tale of struggles with understanding herself, the changing world, educational pressures, bullying, competition over marks – all of it wrapped up in transcending journey of first love.

== Cast ==
- Teju Belawadi as Meera Deshpande
  - Yukti as young Meera
- Nischith Korodi as Madhu
- Bhargav Raju as Dheeraj
- Sharath Gowda as Raju
- Spoorthi Gumaste as Rashmi
- Anushree Kashyap as Sajida
- Sri Ranga Kothur as Babu
- Chandana. M. Rao as Jyothi
- Varsha as Sowmya
- Shreya Hiremath as Madhu's sister
- Kashyap as Abdul
- Akshay Prasad as Mohan
- Surya Vasishta as the Math teacher
- Prathima Vajra as the English teacher
- Pruthwi Banawasi as the principal
- Chandrashekar as Madhu's father
- Satish Kumar as the auto rickshaw driver
- Namith Gowda as Prajwal
- Roopa Rao in a cameo appearance

== Soundtrack ==
The soundtrack and background score was scored by Aparajith Sris, and the audio was released on 23 September 2019. The music was recorded and produced at KrishT Inn Tunes in Bangalore, and mixed and mastered at Tarang Studio. The backing vocals were given by Sri's, Deepak Seth, Eesha Suchi and Surabhi Soman.

Tracklist
No.	Title	Lyrics	Artist(s)	Length
1.	"Beesuva Gaaliyu Ninnusirane"	Kavya Sri	Gurupriya	4:06
2.	"Naavu Hadinaaru Namadashte Kaarubaru"	Roopa Rao	Gunzilla (Shivarjun)	3:30
3.	"Ee Dharani Naachide Pasham"	Kavya Sri	Rakesh Kumar, Shruthi G. Rao	3:30
4.	"Nanage Neene Geleya"	Roopa Rao	Chirantan Bhabhra, Aparajith Sris	4:48
5.	"Chellidaru Malligeya"	Folklore	Shivamurty .M, Mahesh (Chilakawadi)	6:20
Total length:				22:17

== Reception ==
Gantumoote received positive reviews from critics.

Karthik Hebbar of The Hindu called it "a precious gem", further appreciating it by remarking "the real beauty of the film though is in the narrative. The unabashed, unapologetic journey of a girl finding passion and exploring it without inhibition. The camera here gazes at the male body through the female gaze. It is her stare, her pursuit and her passion in play here. The cinema understands and disrobes the real world through this very unique feminine gaze..."

Baradwaj Rangan of Film Companion called it "exquisitely directed and enacted" and praised the director, saying that "Rao manages something very difficult. She holds a series of moods throughout, and the places she chooses to linger on are unusual. She is more interested in character than event, and she practically holds up an X-ray of Meera’s soul. Her framing is unfussy, and yet, there’s quiet beauty in the images of, say, Meera and Madhu against the backdrop of a stone wall. These are little snatches of visual poetry, as is Teju Belawadi’s face."

Theres Sudeep of Deccan Herald said, Gantumoote is a must-watch. It is not every day that you see a film getting a standing ovation as the end credits roll. Gantumoote is such a film."

A Shraddhaa of New Indian Express said the film "does justice to the film’s tag line —baggage — and comes with its own sets of emotions and nostalgia, which take the audience to the good old days." and reviewed, "The subject of innocence and romance requires a certain dose of boldness to be portrayed on screen, especially in Sandalwood, since there are only a few movies that have crossed the limit to project the feelings in a natural manner. Given an A certificate by the censor board, Roopa Rao’s romantic tale, Gantumoote, does cross the conventional barriers, and kisses and cuddles become an innocent part of the story, never becoming vulgar."

Harish Mallya of The News Minute called it, "a rare gem in Kannada cinema [...] Though it looks like a school romance story at the onset, the treatment is very fresh and unique for Kannada cinema." He further noted, "The challenge in making a film like this is that you do not have anything new that can be told. It should turn out to be a collection of experiences. Watching the film, it clearly shows how carefully the team has chosen the moments and has captured those in the most realistic manner, devoid of any glorification and glamour. The charm lies in the simplicity which is apparent all over the film."

== Festival selections ==
- Young Film Market – Mercato Europeo Del Cinema Giovane E Indipendente
- Nitte International Film Festival 2020
- New York Indian Film Festival 2019
- Ottawa Indian Film Festival and Awards 2019
- Indian Film Festival of Melbourne 2019
- Tasveer South Asian Film Festival 2019
- International Women's Film Festival 2019

== Awards and nominations ==
- Best Screenplay: NYIFF 2019
  - Gantumoote created history by becoming the first ever Kannada film to win the Best Screenplay Award at the New York Indian Film Festival.
- Nomination: Best Film in OIIFA 2019
- Finalist: International Women Film Festival 2019
- Nomination: Best Film in Critics Choice awards 2020 (Mumbai)
- Nomination: Best Film Critics awards 2020 (Karnataka)
- Nomination: Best Debut Director- Kannada (9th South Indian International Movie Awards)
