= The Other Love Story =

- Genre: Drama
- Created by: Roopa Rao
- Written by: Roopa Rao
- Directed by: Roopa Rao
- Starring: Shweta Gupta; Spoorthi Gumaste; Archana Mittal; Kalpana Rao; Chandrashekar Pavlur; Gayatri Shankar; Meenu Garg; Manjunath; Nidhi Dinesh; Prerna Chintamani; Naveen; Guru; Nikhita; Ini
- Music by: Aparajith Sris
- Country of origin: India

Production
- Producer: Harini Daddala
- Cinematography: Vijayan Muthu
- Editor: Bharath M.C
- Production company: JLT Films

Original release
- Release: 27 August 2016

The 'Other' Love Story is India's first televised same-sex love story, broadcast as a web series consisting of 12 episodes. The plot, set in the late 1990s/early 2000s, involves two girls in an era when there were no cell phones or internet. The series is written and directed by Roopa Rao, and produced by Harini Daddala for JLT Films. The main characters are played by Shweta Gupta and Spoorthi Gumaste. The 'Other' Love Story premiered on 27 August 2016.

== Cast ==
- Shweta Gupta as Aachal
- Spoorthi Gumaste as Aadya
- Prerna Chintamani as Aadya's friend
- Nidhi Dinesh as Aadya’s friend
