= Harshad =

Harshad is a given name. Notable people with the given name include:

- Harshad Arora (born 1987), Indian television actor
- Harshad Chopda (born 1983), Indian actor
- Harshad Joshi, Indian television show director
- Harshad Mehta (1954–2001), Indian stockbroker

== See also ==
- Harshad number, integer sequence
