= Rajdooth =

- Theatrical release poster
- Directed by: Arjun-Carthyk
- Produced by: M. L. V Satyanaryana
- Starring: Meghamsh; Nakshatra
- Cinematography: Vidyasagar Chinta
- Edited by: Vijay Vardhan Kavuri
- Music by: Jeevan Babu
- Release date: 12 June 2019
- Country: India
- Language: Telugu

Rajdooth is a 2019 Telugu language action comedy film co-directed by Arjun Gunnala and Carthyk. The film stars debutant Meghamsh and Nakshatara in the lead roles.

== Cast ==
- Meghamsh as Sanjay
- Nakshatra Babu as Priya
- Ravi Varma Adduri as Inspector Ravi Varma
- Adhitya as Rajanna
- Kota Srinivasa Rao as Sanjay's grandfather
- Manobala as Lender
- Rajiv Kanakala as Home Minister
- Anish Kuruvilla as Priya's father
- Ravi Varma as Rajanna's son
- Sudharshan as Sanjay's friend
- Venu Yeldandi as Donka
- Priyadarshi Pulikonda as Doctor
- Bhadram as Petrol Bunk Person

== Production ==
Meghamash, the 19-year-old older son of late Srihari and Disco Shanti, was cast to make his film debut. The crew of the film are all debutants as well. The film is named Rajdooth after the motorcycle of the same name.

== Soundtrack ==
Rajdooth

Soundtrack album by Varun Sunil
- Released: 1 July 2019
- Recorded: 2019
- Genre: Feature Film Soundtrack
- Label: Mango Music
- Producer: M. L. V. Satyanarayana

Track listing
No.	Title	Singer(s)	Length
1.	"Manasuna Manasuna"	Siddharth Menon
2.	"Emo Emo"	Varun Sunil
3.	"Chustune Unna"	Sooraj Santhosh, Varun Sunil
4.	"Rajanna"	Anish Krishnan, FuRa and Jasim
5.	"Rajdooth Theme"	Varun Sunil

== Reception ==
The film released to negative reviews.

The Hindu wrote that "The film is technically okay but would do itself a favour if trimmed by another ten minutes. The comedians try to salvage the film... but in vain". The Times of India gave the film one-and-a-half out of five stars and wrote that "Rajdooth is an outdated and dreadful ride".
