= Ondu Shikariya Kathe =

- Directed by: Sachin S Shetty
- Written by: Sachin Shetty
- Story by: Sachin Shetty
- Produced by: Rajeev Shetty, Sachin Shetty
- Starring: Pramod Shetty, Siri Prahlad, Abhimanyu Prajwal, Prasad Cherkady, M K Mata, Sri Priya
- Cinematography: Yogesh Gowda
- Edited by: B. S. Kemparaju
- Music by: Sean Gonsalves, Sanath Balkur
- Release date: 6 March 2020
- Running time: 131 minutes
- Country: India
- Language: Kannada

Ondu Shikariya Kathe (transl. A Hunter's Story) is a 2020 Indian Kannada-language suspense thriller film written and directed by Sachin Shetty. The film stars Pramod Shetty, Siri Prahlad, Prasad Cherkady in lead roles and Abhimanyu Prajwal in an antagonist role. The film won the second best movie award in 2020 Bengaluru International Film Festival.

This film marks the debut of director Sachin Shetty under Shetty Film Factory banner. Yogesh Gowda makes his debut as cinematographer with music composed by Sean Gonsalves and Sanath Balkur. The principal photography commenced on 11 September 2018 followed by a worldwide release on 6 March 2020.

== Plot ==
A series of mysterious events befall when a famous novelist Shambu Shetty(Pramod Shetty), an absolute follower of non-violence, takes up a gun and goes on the hunt and has to deal with the consequences. In the backdrop is the love story of a Yakshagana artist Harsha (Prasad Cherkady) and Uma (Siri Prahlad). The lives of the lovers and Harsha's friend Mohana (Abhimanyu Prajwal) get entwined and affected by Shambu Shetty's actions.

== Cast ==
- Pramod Shetty as Shambu Shetty
- Siri Prahlad as Uma, daughter of Hari
- Abhimanyu Prajwal as Mohana
- Prasad Cherkadi as Harsha
- M.K. Mata as Hari
- Sripriya as Akku, sister of Mohana
- Adarsh Rangayana as young Shambu

== Production ==
The director Sachin Shetty developed the entire story in early 2018. The production began in September 2018. The film was shot mainly in and around the western ghats and coastal karnataka. Agumbe, Thirthahalli, Koppa, Kundapura were the prime location spots. The backwater portions of the film were shot in Thirthahalli.

== Reception ==
The movie released in major theaters across Karnataka on 6 March 2020. The film opened to mostly positive reviews alike from both the public and critics. Prajavani gave a solid positive review appreciating the story, narration and performances of the lead characters. Another Kannada daily Udayavani called the movie heart throbbing lauding the director and performers alike. Times of India gave it three stars calling it 'Ondu Shikariya Kathe is an admirable effort, as it captures the frailties of the human mind'.
