= Roopa Rao =

Indian filmmaker

- Born: Bangalore, Karnataka, India
- Education: Asian Academy of Film & Television
- Occupation: Filmmaker
- Known for: The Other Love Story; Gantumoote

Roopa Rao (born May 18) is an independent Indian film-maker from Bangalore. She is the writer and director of India's first same-sex love story web series, The Other Love Story (2016). Rao is also known for directing critically acclaimed award-winning Kannada film Gantumoote (2019).

== Early life ==
Rao began writing at an early age. She had written the story of two young women falling in love while in college but did not pursue it further due to concerns about the reception of its story-line, as same-sex love between women was a taboo subject in India.

== Career ==
Rao completed a Masters in Commerce with Personnel Management as a specialization and discontinued Masters in Finance. She worked at Infosys for six years. She later resigned her position to pursue a career in filmmaking. She completed a course in film direction and production from Asian Academy of Film and Television, Delhi. After this, she moved to London, UK to assist a documentary filmmaker.

Rao returned to India, where she created documentaries and short films. She co-directed Vishnuvardhana, a Kannada feature film, and Kurai Ondrum Illai, an independent Tamil feature film.

In 2015, she began to work on her own project, The Other Love Story, building on her early writing. Since the central theme of the story is a taboo topic in India, she had difficulties finding producers for her project and turned to Wishberry, a crowd funding platform to raise an amount of Rs 4 lakh.

Rao has won "Best Director" award at NYC Web Fest 2016 and "Best Story" award at TO Web Fest 2017. The Other Love Story has a total of 3 wins and 7 nominations from various National and International Film Festivals.

In 2017, Rao wrote and directed BFF (Breath Friend Forever), a short film where a 7-year-old, after learning about trees in class, tries to understand their importance. The film was an official selection in Toronto International Film Festival (TIFF) and was screened at Ireland National Film Body's Kids' Section.

In 2018, Astu Studios released a travel short film, Love Leh'tter, starring Rao, written and directed by Surya Vasishta. Rao co-founded an independent production house, Ameyukti Studios, with a friend in 2018.

In 2019, Rao's first feature film, Gantumoote had its world premiere at the New York Indian Film Festival (NYIFF), where it won the "Best Screenplay" award. The film is a coming of age, high school drama set in Bangalore in the 1990s.

In 2024, Kenda, the Kannada feature film, was released, produced by Rao's production house, Ameyukti Studios. The film was directed by her long-time associate Sahadev Kelvadi. The movie was written and directed by Kelvadi, and it is Rao's third project as producer under Ameyukti Studios.

In 2025, Rao announced a new featurette film, Asmin, was planned for release on her YouTube Channel in the last week of January. It premiered January 27th, 2025. The film won awards at the Indo French International Festival.

== Filmography ==
Year	Film	Director	Writer	Producer	Language(s)	Notes
2009	Let Live	Yes	Yes	Yes	English- Hindi	Short Documentary; Also Editor
2011	Hot Seat	Yes	Yes	No	Kannada	Short Film
2014	The Night of all Nights	No	No	Line Producer	German	Documentary Feature length
2015	The Century Of Women	No	No	Line Producer	German	Documentary Feature length
2016	The 'Other' Love Story	Yes	Yes	Yes	English; Hindi; Kannada	Web series
2017	BFF (Breath Friend Forever)	Yes	Yes	Yes	English	Short Film
2018	Love Leh'tter	No	No	No	Kannada	Short Film; Actor
2019	Gantumoote	Yes	Yes	Yes	Kannada	Debut feature film
2020	Silent Passage (Pandemic Tales)	Yes	Yes	No	English	Short Film
2020	Year of Silence (for Arte TV)	No	No	Line Producer	German; English	Television Series
2021	Naked (For Arte TV Series)	No	No	Line Producer	German; English	Television Series
2024	Kenda	No	No	Yes	Kannada	Feature Film
2024	Coromandel Coast (For Arte TV Series)	Yes	Yes	Line Producer	German; English	Television Series
2025	Asmin	Yes	Yes	Yes	Kannada; English	Mini-Feature Film
2026	Bhayankara Preeti	Yes	Yes	Yes	Kannada, Tamil; Telugu	Feature Film (Post Production)
2026	Gochara	Yes	Yes	Yes	Kannada	Feature Film (Pre Production)

As Associated Director

- Vishnuvardhana - 2011 Kannada
- Kurai Ondrum Illai - 2013 Tamil

== Awards ==
- 2016: New York Web Fest Award for Best Direction: The Other Love Story (2016)
- 2017: TO Web Fest Award for Best LGBTQ Story: The Other Love Story (2016)
- 2017: Boston LGBTQ Film Festival Award for Best International Web Series: The Other Love Story(2016)
- 2016: New York Web Fest Nomination for Outstanding Writing: The Other Love Story (2016)
- 2016: New York Web Fest Nomination for Best Webseries: The Other Love Story (2016)
- 2017: Vancouver Web Festival Award for Best Drama: The Other Love Story (2016)
- 2016: Miami Short Film Festival Semi Finalist: The Other Love Story (2016)
- 2019: New York Indian Film Festival Award for Best Screenplay: Gantumoote (2019)
- 2020: Critics Choice Film Awards Nomination for Best Director:Gantumoote (2019)
- 2020: Critics Choice Film Awards Nomination for Best Film:Gantumoote (2019)
- 2020: Critics Choice Film Awards Nomination for Best Writing:Gantumoote (2019)
- 2020: Critics Choice Film Awards Nomination for Best Director:Gantumoote (2019)
- 2020: Karnataka Film Critics Awards Nomination for Best Director:Gantumoote (2019)
- 2020: Karnataka Film Critics Awards Nomination for Best Writer:Gantumoote (2019)
- 2020: Karnataka Film Critics Awards Nomination for Best Film:Gantumoote (2019)
- 2020: Raghavendra Chitravani Award for Best Debudant Director:Gantumoote (2019)
- 2021: SIIMA Awards Nomination for Best Debudant Director:Gantumoote(2019)
- 2023: Indo French International Film Festival for Best Indian Short Film:Asmin(2023)
- 2023: Indo French International Film Festival for Best Director Critics Choice:Asmin(2023)

== See also ==
- List of female film and television directors
