= Psycho (2020 film) =

2020 psychological horror film directed by Mysskin

- Theatrical release poster
- Directed by: Mysskin
- Written by: Mysskin
- Produced by: Arun Mozhi Manickam
- Starring: Udhayanidhi Stalin: Nithya Menen; Aditi Rao Hydari; Rajkumar Pitchumani
- Cinematography: Tanveer Mir
- Edited by: N. Arunkumar
- Music by: Ilaiyaraaja
- Production company: Double Meaning Production
- Distributed by: Red Giant Movies
- Release date: 24 January 2020
- Running time: 144 minutes
- Country: India
- Language: Tamil

Psycho is a 2020 Indian Tamil-language psychological thriller slasher film written and directed by Mysskin. The film was produced by Arun Mozhi Manickam under Double Meaning Production. The film stars Udhayanidhi Stalin, Nithya Menen, Aditi Rao Hydari and debutant Rajkumar Pitchumani as the main antagonist with an ensemble supporting cast. Ilaiyaraaja composed the soundtrack of the film, with cinematography by Tanvir Mir and editing by N. Arunkumar. Production began in September 2018. The film released worldwide on 24 January 2020 to positive response and become a commercial success.

== Plot ==
Gautham, a blind musician, falls in love with radio jockey Dagini. After persistent efforts to win her affection, Dagini asks him to meet her at a location she mentions during her radio broadcast. Gautham follows the broadcast and arrives at a train station. While waiting, Dagini notices a mysterious man approaching, who sedates and abducts her before Gautham can intervene. Relying on his heightened sense of smell, Gautham realises something is wrong. The police later inform him that Dagini is the 14th victim of a psychopathic serial killer who decapitated the previous 13 abductees.

Disillusioned by the lack of police progress, Gautham decides to track down Dagini independently. At his lair, the killer prepares to behead Dagini, but pauses when she displays no fear, claiming that Gautham will avenge her death. Taking her statement as a challenge, the killer chains her to a wall and vents his frustration by picking up a prostitute and decapitating her in his lair while a helpless Dagini witnesses. Meanwhile, Gautham enlists the help of Kamala, a quadriplegic former police officer who previously investigated the case. Utilising scent clues related to the victims, they deduce that the killer owns pig farms in the region.

While visiting the pig farms yield no concrete leads, the alerted killer visits Gautham's home directly. Using his walking stick, Gautham secretly measures the dimensions of the killer's vehicle. Gautham's friend, Rajanayakam, attempts to tail the killer, but the latter lures him into a field of tall grass and murders him. Demoralised by Rajanayakam's death, Gautham considers dropping the search until Kamala identifies a lead from CCTV footage of a college function. Through a staff member present at the event and using information about the vehicle, they identify the killer as Angulimala.

In captivity, Dagini explores the lair and discovers an imprisoned woman alongside a deceased police officer. The woman reveals that she was Angulimala's former teacher named Rachel, who subjected him to severe physical abuse as a punishment for masturbating. The skeletal remains is of the police officer who took Angulimal to juvenile detention when he was a kid, and raped him. Gautham invades the lair, triggering an intruder alarm. In the ensuing struggle, Gautham manages to handcuff Angulimala's leg, locates Dagini, and escapes with her.

Attempting to free himself, Angulimala pleads with Dagini. She places the handcuff key on the ground; however, the teacher swallows the key to ensure his continued punishment. Enraged, Angulimala fatally tears her apart in the dark cell to retrieve the key, unlocks himself, and pursues the pair vainly. Later, during a televised press interview, Dagini expresses empathy for Angulimala, asserting that childhood abuse shaped his actions and that proper care could have prevented his crimes. Watching the broadcast and feeling understood for the first time, Angulimala smiles and jumps off a cliff to his death.

== Cast ==
- Udhayanidhi Stalin as Gautham
- Nithya Menen as Kamala Das
- Aditi Rao Hydari as Dagini (Voice dubbed by Savitha Reddy)
- Rajkumar Pitchu Mani as Angulimala, the main antagonist
- Ram as Muthu
- Aadukalam Naren as Deputy Superintendent of Police
- Srinath as Venkat
- Singampuli as Rajanayakam
- Shaji Chen as Dagini's father
- Renuka as Vasantha, Kamala's mother
- Aruldoss as Maari
- Pritham as Teacher Rachel
- Bava Chelladurai as Akbar
- Ashvin Raja as Ponram
- Bharati Mani
- G. R. Adithya
- Jaya Rao

== Production ==
Mysskin decided to cast Udhayanidhi Stalin in the lead role, despite earlier reports that Shanthanu Bhagyaraj would star. Under the banner of Arun Mozhi Manickam's Double Meaning Productions, Mysskin finalised a cast of Aditi Rao Hydari, Nithya Menon, Rajkumar Pitchumani, and Ram, while Ilaiyaraaja, who worked on the director's previous films Nandalala and Onaayum Aattukkuttiyum, was signed as music composer. Principal photography began in early September 2018, with a first look promotional poster released later that month, revealing the title of the project to be Psycho. The title pays homage to the 1960 film directed by Alfred Hitchcock of whom Mysskin is a self-professed fan. A second schedule of the film was completed in early December 2018 after being shot in hill-towns across Tamil Nadu. Cinematographer P. C. Sreeram was replaced by his assistant Tanvir Mir.

== Music ==
Psycho

Soundtrack album by Ilaiyaraaja
- Released: 2019
- Genre: Feature film soundtrack
- Length: 14:18
- Label: Sony Music India
- Producer: Ilaiyaraaja

Ilaiyaraaja chronology
Happi (2019)	Psycho (2019)	Punyakoti (2020)

Singles from Psycho
- 1. "Unna Nenachu" Released: 18 November 2019

The soundtrack of the film was composed by Ilaiyaraaja. The audio rights were secured by Sony Music India. The first single, titled "Unna Nenachu" and written by Kabilan, was released on 18 November 2019.

Track listing
No.	Title	Lyrics	Singer(s)	Length
1.	"Unna Nenachu"	Kabilan	Sid Sriram	4:36
2.	"Neenga Mudiyuma"	Kabilan	Sid Sriram	4:37
3.	"Thai Madiyil"	Mysskin	Kailash Kher	5:05
Total length:				14:18

== Release ==
Initially the producer announced that the film would release worldwide on 27 December 2019, but it was released on 24 January 2020 instead.

== Reception ==
The Times of India gave 3 out of 5 stars and wrote, "First-rate filmmaking combines with perceptive writing to give us a unique experience", adding that it was not a conventional serial killer film. The Hindu wrote, "Mysskin’s remarkable achievement — if you discount the artistic merits [...] in Psycho — weighs heavily on making a serial killer the protagonist of the movie, giving him a voice and more importantly, a cause" and felt Udhayanidhi and Hydari were rightly cast. The film was also reviewed by Sreedhar Pillai writing for Firstpost, and Janani K of India Today.
