= Arishadvarga =

Film

- Directed by: Arvind Kamath
- Written by: Arvind Kamath
- Produced by: Kanasu Talkies
- Starring: Avinash; Samyukta Hornad; Nanda Gopal; Mahesh Bung; Anju Alva Naik; Arvind Kuplikar; Gopalkrishna Deshpande; Sreepathi Manjanbailu
- Cinematography: Balaji Manohar
- Edited by: Arvind Kamath, Beena Paul, Divya Raghuram, Bharath MC.
- Music by: Udit Haritas
- Release dates: 23 June 2019 (LIFF); 27 November 2020
- Country: India
- Language: Kannada

Arishadvarga is a 2019 Indian Kannada language neo noir mystery thriller film written, directed and produced by Arvind Kamath, under the banner Kanasu Talkies. The film is a tale of lust, anger, love, greed, power, jealousy, mistaken identity and individual deficiencies. It’s a fatalistic noir tale of one man’s vain struggle to escape his own limitations, unfortunately, an impossibility in the world of noir. The film stars Avinash, Samyukta Hornad, Nanda Gopal, Mahesh Bung, Anju Alva Naik, Gopalkrishna Deshpande, Aravind Kuplikar, Sudha Belawadi, M. G. Sathya, and Sripathi Manjanabayalu in prominent roles. The film had its world premiere at London Indian Film Festival during June 2019, where it received positive reviews, followed by the Asian Premiere at Singapore South Asian International film festival during September 2019 and North American Premiere at the Vancouver International South Asian Film Festival during November 2019. It was reported to be partially based on Shankar Vijaykumar's short story Someone.

== Plot ==
Set in present-day Bangalore, an aspiring actor doubling up as an amateur gigolo gets caught up in a sticky situation after accepting a surprise gift from an anonymous client. Anish is desperately trying to make it as an actor but his dire financial situation pushes him to look for an escape, which he finds with an anonymous wealthy client named Manasaa. Called to her place one day for a rendezvous, he turns up only to be met with a surprise gift, ‘a murder’.

The murdered victim was a film producer and quarry owner, Manjunath Bhat. Based on his invite, aspiring actress Shruthi also arrives at the scene for an audition and finds herself in a compromising situation. Shruthi and Anish are ordered by a woman via VOIP call to dispose of the body as soon as possible. A good-hearted petty thief cum auto-driver joins them when he comes to the murder scene for pilferage who leads police to the murder house.

Investigation is done by Ashok who is leading a boring life of being a single. He is supported by Rajanna on investigation. On investigation, he comes across Kruthi Bhat who is the second wife of deceased Manjunath and who has been living with him. She reveals the story of how they both ended up in love and marriage in spite of their age difference and how Manjunath's age factor impacts her sexual life. She explains how Anish became common friend to both of them who was requested by Manjunath to help her wife getting pregnant in exchange of Anish getting hero role in Manjunath's production. Though kruthi was not ready for this, she got convinced after Manjunath's explanation. But, eventually, they both decide to ignore Anish as they could not fulfill Anish promise due to Manjunath's business loss and that has led Anish to murder Manjunath.

Ashok was almost convinced with this narrative from Kruthi till he comes across a character named Karthik who works for Manjunath. Karthik was introduced to Kruthi by Manjunath, and she started liking him. Manjunath's sexual problem led her to get her needs satisfied by Karthik, and she becomes pregnant. In the meantime, Manjunath and Kartik's relationship fell off and on knowing that Kruthi is pregnant, he wants to make money out of her by threatening her with her intimate video. Manjunath learns of this and in the ensuing quarrel between him and Kruthi, she ends up in killing him. Then she hatches up a plan to make Anish as murderer by inviting him over call, whose number was given by a high-end pimp, to come to her house for his service.

Ashok who got to know that Karthik and Kruthi had illicit relationship plans to make use of this situation for his advantage. He murders Karthik in a quarry and settles in Kruthi's home and enjoys his new life. Movie ends with Ashok getting a call from Maanasa, who seems to be the first wife of Manjunath and settled in foreign, leaving it open ended for a sequel.

== Cast ==
- Avinash as Manjunath Bhat, a film producer
- Samyukta Hornad as Saakshi Rao, an aspiring actress
- Nanda Gopal as Ashok Kalburgi, Police Inspector
- Mahesh Bung as Anish Urs, an aspiring actor
- Anju Alva Naik as Kruthi Bhat, a film editor
- Aravind Kuplikar as Karthik, an aspiring film director
- Gopalkrishna Deshpande as Bheemsen Joshi, an auto-rickshaw driver
- Sripathi Manjanabailu as Raajanna, Head Constable

== Soundtrack ==
Arishadvarga

Soundtrack album by Udit Haritas
- Released: 2020
- Recorded: 2019
- Genre: Soundtrack
- Label: Zee Music Co.
- Producer: Kanasu Talkies

The music is composed by Udit Haritas ("Agnata") and this is his first feature film.

=== Songs ===
No.	Title	Lyrics	Singer(s)	Length
1.	"Bhangi Sedho Bhangi - The weed song"	Pavan Kumar	Sanjith Hegde, Pancham, Udit Haritas	5:07
2.	"Doora Dari"	Pavan Kumar	Ananya Bhagat, Udit Haritas, Eesha Suchi, Siri Ravikumar	5:45
3.	"Gadiyaarake [Hard Rock]"	Pavan Kumar	Udit Haritas	4:13
4.	"Gadiyaarake"	Pavan Kumar	Raghu Dixit	3:56
5.	"Naane Bhoomi"	Pavan Kumar	Sanjith Hegde, Ananya Bhat	6:24
6.	"Anvartha"	Pavan Kumar	Aditi Sagar, Venkat Raman	3:44
7.	"Yaava Bimba"	Pavan Kumar	Siri Ravikumar, Udit Haritas	4:15
8.	"Nungu Gulige"	Udit Haritas	Aditi Sagar, Udit Haritas	3:54

== Reception ==
The film opened up to positive reviews at the London Indian Film Festival. On the review aggregator website Rotten Tomatoes, 83% of 6 critics' reviews are positive, with an average rating of 6/10.

Josh Hurtado of ScreenAnarchy stated, "Arishadvarga is a Labyrinthine Thriller Full of Surprises". Baradwaj Rangan of Film Companion South wrote, "With Nathicharami and now this, Kannada cinema seems to have leapfrogged over other industries in terms of bridging the gap between (relatively) older women and lust."
