= Raahu =

2020 Indian Telugu-language film

- Film poster
- Directed by: Subbu Vedula
- Written by: Subbu Vedula
- Produced by: AVR Swamy; Raja Deverakonda; Sri Shakthi Babji; Subbu Vedula
- Starring: Kriti Garg; AbeRaam Varma
- Cinematography: Suresh Ragutua; Eshwar Yellumahanthi
- Music by: Praveen Lakkaraju
- Production company: Shakthi Swaroop Movie Creations
- Distributed by: Suresh Productions
- Release date: 28 February 2020
- Running time: 123 minutes
- Country: India
- Language: Telugu

Raahu is a 2020 Indian Telugu-language thriller film written and directed by debutant Subbu Vedula. The film features Kriti Garg and AbeRaam Varma in the lead roles while Vedula, Satyam Rajesh, Prabhakar, and Raja Ravindra play supporting roles with music composed by Praveen Lakkaraju. The plot revolves around Bhanu (Garg) who suffers conversion disorder, which makes her temporarily blind upon the sight of blood.

== Plot ==
Bhanu (kriti garg) suffers from 'conversion disorder' a.k.a. 'hysterical blindness' where she goes temporarily blind under severe stress, in her case triggered upon seeing blood. She must fight her enemy who inflicts more bloodshed than she ever imagined.

== Cast ==
- Kriti Garg as Bhanu
- AbeRaam Varma as Sesh
- Prabhakar as Nagaraju
- Subbu Vedula as the police commissioner
- Satyam Rajesh
- Raja Ravindra
- Sahasra as child Bhanu

== Production ==
After returning from the US, Vedula worked on the project for over two-and-a-half years. Vedula cast AbeRaam Varma in the lead role after seeing his performance in Manu (2018).

Raahu was majorly filmed in Hyderabad, while some sequences are shot in Sikkim.

== Soundtrack ==
The music was composed by Praveen Lakkaraju. The album's single "Emo Emo Emo" with the vocals of Sid Sriram was received positively by the audience.

Track listing
No.	Title	Lyrics	Singer(s)	Length
1.	"Emo Emo Emo"	Srinivasa Mouli	Sid Sriram	4:02
2.	"Ithi Oka Grahanam"	Subbu Vedula	Anurag Kulkarni	3:06
3.	"Kshanama"	Srinivasa Mouli	Aditi Bhavaraju, Anurag Kulkarni	3:20
4.	"Entha Chuda Chakande"	Subbu Vedula	Anurag Kulkarni, Sahithi Chaganti	3:32
5.	"Lokamantha Okkasari Maare"	Srinivasa Mouli	Manisha Eerabathini	3:05
Total length:				17:05

== Release and reception ==
Raahu was released on 28 February 2020. The film released its digital premiere through ZEE5.

Sangeetha Devi writing for The Hindu, termed the film as an "indie-spirited venture" and an "appreciable first attempt". Prakash Pecheti of Telangana Today wrote that "Raahu is a honest attempt from newbie Subbu Vedula to tell a story of a different subject which was never touched by Telugu directors."

The Times of India rated the film 2 out of 5 stars. While appreciating the execution and production values, the review stated "Director Subbu should've worked a little more on the way he narrated the story because he squandered away a good opportunity. Raahu is sincere and hard work that unfortunately goes in vain!"

Santosh Yamsani from Sakshi wrote that though the director's attempt at a novel concept is appreciable, he was unable turn it into a strong screenplay.
