= Maya Kannadi (2020 film) =

2020 thriller film by Vinod Poojary

- Directed by: Vinod Poojary
- Screenplay by: Vinod Poojary; Mandy Manju
- Produced by: Siforia Pictures; King Of Hearts
- Starring: Prabhu Mundkur; KS Sridhar; Kaajal Kunder
- Cinematography: Mani Kookal Nair
- Edited by: Sujith Nayak
- Music by: Abhishek SN
- Release date: 28 February 2020
- Running time: 120 minutes
- Country: India
- Language: Kannada

Maya Kannadi (transl. Mirror of Illusion) is a 2020 Indian Kannada language thriller film directed by Vinod Poojary, produced by Siforia Pictures and King of Hearts Entertainments, and starring Prabhu Mundkur, KS Sridhar, Kaajal Kunder, Anvita Sagar, and Anoop Sagar. The film is based on the viral "Blue Whale Challenge". The film was released on 28 February 2020.

== Cast ==
- Prabhu Mundkur as Sandy
- Anoop Sagar as Golden Guru
- KS Sridhar as Prakash - Trustee
- Kaajal Kunder as Priya
- Anvita Sagar as Madhu
- Karthik Rao as Murthy
- Ashwin Rao Pallakki
- Shrishreya Rao
- Ramesh Rai Kukkuvalli

== Production ==
The film is produced by Siforia Pictures and King of Hearts Entertainments. Principle shooting began on 1 June 2018 and completed on 1 July 2018.

== Music ==
Songs for the film were composed by Abhishek SN and lyrics by Abhishek SN, Rajneesh Amin and Keerthan. The soundtrack rights were acquired by Anand Audio.

Sr. No	Song name	Music director	Singers	Lyrics
01	Kelu Jaaneye Kelu	Abhishek S. N	Chethan Naik, Shwetha Chandrashekar	Abhishek S N
02	Biddaagide	Abhishek S. N	Eesha Suchi	Rajneesh Amin
03	Maya Kannadi	Abhishek S. N	Chethan Naik	Keerthan Bhandary
04	Choo Bide	Abhishek S. N	Abhishek S N, Chethan Naik, Swaroop Ramesh	Abhishek S N
05	Gottillade Mana	Abhishek S. N	Shwetha Chandrashekhar	Abhishek S N

== Release ==
The film was released on 28 February 2020.
