= List of Kannada films of 2020 =

A list of Kannada language films produced in the Kannada film industry in India in the year 2020.

== Box office collection ==
The highest-grossing Sandalwood films released in 2020, by worldwide box office gross revenue, are as follows:

Highest worldwide gross of 2020
Rank	Title	Production company	Gross	Ref.
1	Popcorn Monkey Tiger	Studio 18	₹6 crore (US$620,000)	
2	Shivaji Surathkal	Anjanadri Cine creations	₹2 crore (US$210,000)	

== January–June ==
Opening		Title	Director	Cast	Notes	Ref
J A N U A R Y	3	Rajeeva	Flying King Manju	Mayur Patel, Akshatha Sreedhar Shastry, Madan Patel, Shankar Ashwath	Produced by RK Cine Creations	
J A N U A R Y	3	Veshadhari	Shivanand Bhushi	Aryan, Shruthi Rajendra, Sonam Rai, Micheal Madhu	Produced by Sri Sai Bhagavan Combines	
J A N U A R Y	17	Gudumana Avathara	Muniraju	Raj Goutham, Sannidhi, Century Gowda, Gaddappa, Alisha Shankarappa, M. S. Umesh, Dingri Nagaraj	Produced by Sri Bharani Movie Makers	
J A N U A R Y	17	Jan Dhan	T. Nagachandra	Sunil Shashi, Rachana Dasharath, Sai Lakshman, Suman Sharma, Master Lakshman	Produced by Sri Siddhi Vinayaka Films	
J A N U A R Y	17	Sri Bharatha Baahubali	Manju Mandavya	Manju Mandavya, Chikkanna, Sarah Harish, Shreya Shetty, Shruti Prakash	Produced by Shivaprakash T	
J A N U A R Y	24	Gadinadu	Nag Hunasond	Prabhu Surya, Sanchita Padukone, Charan Raj, Shobharaj, Raghu Raj, Deepak Shetty	Produced by Akshay Film Makers	
J A N U A R Y	24	India vs England	Nagathihalli Chandrashekhar	Vasishta Simha, Manvitha Harish, Ananth Nag, Sumalatha Ambareesh	Produced by Y.N.Shankregowda & Friends	
J A N U A R Y	24	Khaki	Naveen Reddy B	Chiranjeevi Sarja, Tanya Hope, Shivamani, Chaya Singh, Dev Gill	Produced by Tarun Shivappa	
J A N U A R Y	24	Krutha	Uppari Ramesh	Vijayendra, Meghana Gowda, Rashika	Produced by VK Groups Production	
J A N U A R Y	24	Naanu Matthu Gunda	Srinivas Thimmaiah	Shivaraj KR Pete, Samyukta Hornad, Govinde Gowda, Rockline Sudhakar	Produced by Raghu Hassan	
J A N U A R Y	24	Navelru... Half Boiled	B Shivaraj Venkattachcha	Sunil Kumar, Matangi Prasanna, Tabla Nani, Devadas Kapikad	Produced by Ameer Ahmad	
J A N U A R Y	31	Kaanadante Maayavadanu	Raj Pathipati	Vikas, Sindhu Loknath, Achyuth Kumar, Suchendra Prasad, Raghava Uday, Bhajarangi Loki	Produced by Chandrashekar Naidu, Som Singh & Pushpa Somsingh	
J A N U A R Y	31	Love Mocktail	Krishna	Krishna, Milana Nagaraj, Amrutha Iyengar, Rachana Inder	Produced by Krishna Talkies	
J A N U A R Y	31	Dinga	Abhishek Jain	Aarva Gowda, Anusha Rodrigues, Abhishek Jain, Vijay Eshwar	Produced by Sri Mayakara Productions; First Kannada film shot in smart phone*	
J A N U A R Y	31	Namo	Puttaraj Swamy	Puttaraj Swamy, Rashmitha Gowda, Mahesh Raj, Bhairava	Produced by Sneha Sparsha Entertainment	
J A N U A R Y	31	Nigarva	Jayasimha Musuri	Bullet Vinu, Aryan Suryaa, Bharathi Hegde, Krishne Gowda	Produced by Musuri Krishnamurthy Films.	
J A N U A R Y	31	Ramana Savari	K Shivarudraiah	Master Aaron, Rajesh Nataranga, Sonu Gowda, Sudha Belawadi, Master Ayush	Produced by Sudha Creations	
F E B R U A R Y	7	Gentleman	Jadesh Kumar Hampi	Prajwal Devaraj, Nishvika Naidu, Sanchari Vijay, Tabla Nani, Bharath Kalyan	Produced by G Cinemas	
F E B R U A R Y	7	Malgudi Days	Kishore Moodbidri	Vijay Raghavendra, Greeshma Sridhar, Arjun Kapikad, Dhanraj CM	Produced by Swayam Prabha Entertainment & Productions	
F E B R U A R Y	7	Dia	K S Ashoka	Dheekshith Shetty, Pruthvi Ambaar, Kushee Ravi, Pavithra Lokesh	Produced by Sri Swarnalatha Productions	
F E B R U A R Y	7	Matte Udbhava	Kodlu Ramakrishna	Pramod, Milana Nagaraj, Rangayana Raghu, Sudha Belawadi, Avinash, Mohan Shankar	Produced by White Panthers Creatives, Infinity Films; Sequel to the film Udbhava	
F E B R U A R Y	7	Bill Gates	Srinivasa C Mandya	Shishir Shastry, Chikkanna, Kuri Prathap, Priyanka Chincholi, Rajshekar, Akshara Reddy, Rashmitha Roja, Girish Shivanna	Produced by Sri Panchajanya Cine Creations	
F E B R U A R Y	7	Jiilka	Kaveesh Shetty	Kaveesh Shetty, Priya Hegde, Prathik Shetty, Laksha Shetty	Produced by Kaveesha Shetty Production	
F E B R U A R Y	7	3rd Class	Ashok Dev	Jagadish Pawar, Roopika, Divya Rao, Avinash	Produced by 7 Hills Studio	
F E B R U A R Y	7	Ojas	C J Vardhan	Neha Saxena, Bhavya, Mohan, Yathiraj, Dingri Nagaraj	Produced by Rajath Raghunath Productions	
F E B R U A R Y	14	Navarathna	Prathap Raj	Prathap Raj, Moksha Kushal, Sharath Lohitashwa, Amith V Raj	Produced by PR Film Studios	
F E B R U A R Y	14	Benkiyalli Aralida Hoovu	Devishree Prasad	Anupama Gowda, Vishu E Achar, Lakshman Gowda, Mimicry Gopi	Produced by Haa-Cine Creations	
F E B R U A R Y	14	Demo Piece	Vivek A	Bharath Bopanna, Sparsha Rekha, Sonal Monteiro	Produced by Rekha Movies	
F E B R U A R Y	14	Gadappana Circle	B R Keshav	Gaddappa, Century Gowda, Abhishek H N, Sukanya	Produced by Bangalore Cinemas	
F E B R U A R Y	14	Gift Box	Raghu S P	Ritvvikk Mathad, Ameeta Kulal, Deepti Mohan, Murali Gundanna	Produced by Halli Chithra Productions	
F E B R U A R Y	14	Prema Swara	SLN	SLN, Amrutha Gowda, Nirosha, Vijaya Ranjini	Produced by CSI Filmy World	
F E B R U A R Y	14	Saagutha Doora Doora	Ravi Theja	Apeksha Purohit, Mahesh Siddu, Naveen Kumar, Ashik Arya	Produced by Khushi Kanasu Creations	
F E B R U A R Y	14	Saavu in Love	K T Santhosh	Govinde Gowda, Santhosh, Sanvi Ponnamma, Veda	Produced by Hassan Movies	
F E B R U A R Y	14	Thund Haikla Savasa	B M Giriraj	Kishore Kumar G, Abhay Surya, Vidarsha, Shakeela, Sadhu Kokila, Abhinayashree	Produced by Sri Shiradi Sai Entertainers	
F E B R U A R Y	21	Popcorn Monkey Tiger	Duniya Soori	Dhananjay, Niveditha, Amrutha Iyengar, Sapthami Gowda	Produced by Studio 18	
F E B R U A R Y	21	Aadyaa	Chaitanya KM	Chiranjeevi Sarja, Shruthi Hariharan, Sangeetha Bhat, Pramod Shetty, Ravishankar Gowda	Remake of Telugu film Kshanam (2016); Produced by People Media Factory & STF Entertainments	
F E B R U A R Y	21	Shivaji Surathkal - The Case of Ranagiri Rahasya	Akash Srivatsa	Ramesh Aravind, Radhika Narayan, Aarohi Narayan, Avinash	Produced by Anjanadri Cine Creations	
F E B R U A R Y	21	Mounam	Raj Pandith	Avinash, Balaji Sharma, Mayuri Kyatari, Hanumanthe Gowda	Produced by Niharika Movies	
F E B R U A R Y	21	Seethamma Bandalu Sirimallige Thottu	Ashok K Kadaba	Nandish Kumar, Samhitha Vinya, Vinny Fernandes	Produced by Kavana Pictures	
F E B R U A R Y	21	Jnana Gange	L Vinod Kumar	Srinivasa Prabhu, Aravind, Andan Gowda, Roopesh Kumar	Produced by Jnanagange Creations	
F E B R U A R Y	21	Om Shanti Om	Achala S Promod	P. Sharath Kumar, Rekha Pandit, Shobaraj	Produced by Jai Bhuvaneshwari Productions	
F E B R U A R Y	28	Mayabazar 2016	Radhakrishna Reddy	Raj B. Shetty, Vasishta Simha, Achyuth Kumar, Prakash Raj, Sadhu Kokila, Sudha Rani, Chaithra Rao	Produced by PRK Productions	
F E B R U A R Y	28	Bicchugatti Chapter −1 Dalvayi Dange	Hari Santhosh	Rajvardhan, Hariprriya, Prabhakar	Based on novel Bichhugathi Baramanna Nayaka by Dr.B.L.Venu; Produced by Om Sai Krishna Productions	
F E B R U A R Y	28	Aanebala	Soonagahalli Raju	Sagar Gowda, Rakshitha Ravindar	Produced by Janatha Talkies	
F E B R U A R Y	28	Maya Kannadi	Vinod Poojary	Prabhu Mundkur, KS Sridhar, Kaajal Kunder	Produced by Siforia Pictures & King of Hearts Entertainment	
F E B R U A R Y	28	Jaggi Jagannath	Om Sai Prakash.	Likhit Raj, Duniya Rashmi, Sai Kumar, Tabla Nani	Produced by Jai Mylara Lingeshwara Movies & L R Productions	
F E B R U A R Y	28	Asura Samhara	Pradeep S.	Hari Prasad, Harshala Honey, Shivu Balaji	Produced by Sri Chandikeshwari Creations	
M A R C H	6	Maduve Madri Sari Hogthane	Gopi Kerur	Shiva Chandra Kumar, Aradhya, Srilakshmi Desai, Aruna Balraj, Ramesh Bhat	Produced by SLD Productions	
M A R C H	6	My Name is Raja	Ashwin Krishna	Raaj Suriyan, Nasreen, Aakarshika, Prabhu Surya	Produced by Amogh Enterprises	
M A R C H	6	Ondu Shikariya Kathe	Sachin Shetty	Pramod Shetty, Siri Prahalad, Sripriya, Prasad Cherkady	Produced by Shetty’s Film Factory	
M A R C H	6	Preethi Endarenu	Manju Sagar	Manju Sagar, Ramanitu Chaudhary, Jeevan, Sharath Lohitashwa	Produced by Manju Movies	
M A R C H	6	Wrong Turn	Anand .D.K	Uday.I.H, Ravi Sagar, Sandhya Gowda	Produced by Sri Thayi Yallammadevi Cine Combines	
M A R C H	6	Drona	Pramod Chakravorty	Shiva Rajkumar, Ravi Kishan, Ineya, Rangayana Raghu	Remake of Tamil film Saattai (2012); Produced by Dolphin Media House	
M A R C H	12	Shivarjuna	Shiva Thejas	Chiranjeevi Sarja, Akshatha Srinivas, Amrutha Iyengar, Kishore, Ravi Kishan	Remake of Tamil film Giri; Produced by Nischitha Combines	
M A R C H	13	Nam Kathe Nim Jothe	Deepak B. C	Deepak B C, Anjali K.E, Narada Muni, Santosh Kumar	Produced by Keshava Dreams Cine Combines	
M A R C H	13	Naragunda Bandaya	Nagendra Magadi	Shubha Poonja, Raksh, Avinash, Bhavya, Sadhu Kokila	Produced by Omkara Films	
M A R C H	13	5 Adi 7 Angula	Nandalike Nityananda Prabhu	Rasik Kumar, Bhuvan Narayan, Adithi Acharya	Produced by BeyonDreams Creation Pvt Ltd	
M A R C H	13	Kushka	Vikram Yoganand	Guruprasad, Chandu Gowda, Kailash Pal, Sanjana Anand	Produced by Smart Screen Productions	

== July - December ==
Opening		Title	Director	Cast	Notes	Ref
J U L Y	17	Law	Raghu Samarth	Ragini Chandran, Siri Prahlad, Mukhyamantri Chandru, Sudharani, Achyuth Kumar	Produced by PRK Productions; Released on Amazon Prime Video	
J U L Y	24	French Biriyani	Pannaga Bharana	Danish Sait, Sal Yusuf, Disha Madan, Rangayana Raghu, Nagabhushana	Produced by PRK Productions; Released on Amazon Prime Video	
O C T O B E R	29	Bheemasena Nalamaharaja	Karthik Saragur	Aravinnd Iyer, Aarohi Narayan, Priyanka Thimmesh, Achyuth Kumar, Vijay Chendoor	Paramvah Studios; Pushkar Films; Lost and Found Films; Released on Amazon Prime Video	
N O V E M B E R	19	Mane Number 13	Vivy Kathiresan	Ramana, Sanjeev, Varsha Bollamma, Aishwarya Gowda	Produced by Sri Swarnalatha Productions; Released on Amazon Prime Video	
N O V E M B E R	20	ACT 1978	Manso Re	Yagna Shetty, B. Suresha, Shruti, Vijay, Pramod Shetty	Produced by D Creations	
N O V E M B E R	27	Arishadvarga	Arvind Kamath	Avinash, Samyukta Hornad, Sudha Belawadi, Anju Alva Naik, Mahesh Bung, Nandagopal	Produced by Kanasu Talkies	
D E C E M B E R	11	Pursoth Rama	Saru	Hrithik Saru, Ravishankar Gowda, Shivaraj K. R. Pete, Kuri Prathap, Bank Janardhan, Manasa, Sahana	Produced by Manasa Devi Productions	
D E C E M B E R	11	Sadhane Shikara	Eeranna N. Madhugiri	Vijanath Biradar, Doddarange Gowda, Shankanada Anjanappa, Apoorva	Produced by Sri Jaganmathe Enterprises	
D E C E M B E R	17	Kiladigalu	Hariharan B. P.	Mahendra Munoth, Sheshagiri, Hariharan B. P., Gunavathi, Gururaj Hoskote	Produced by Anand Cinemas & Purvika Amrutha Creations	
D E C E M B E R	18	Nanonthara	Ramesh Kaggalu	Taarak Shekarappa, Rakshika, Devaraj, Rockline Sudhakar	Produced by JJ Movies	
D E C E M B E R	18	RH 100	Mahesh M. C.	Ganesh D. S., Chitra, Harish Kumar. L, Kavya, Somashekara	Produced by SLS Productions	
D E C E M B E R	18	Thanike	Kali Gowda	Anil Kumar, Gulshan Samiullah, Chandana Janaki, Muni Raju, Nikhil Raj	Produced by Kali Cinemas	
D E C E M B E R	25	Avanalli Ivalilli	Sandesh Krishnamoorthy	Prabhu Mundkur, Duniya Rashmi, Jaanvi Jyothi, Hanumanthe Gowda	Produced by LNR Productions	
D E C E M B E R	25	Prathibimba	R. Sagar	Pradeep Soans, Harsh, Sagar, Shobha, Mahalakshmi	Produced by Pradeep Sagar Movies	
