= Adi Kapyare Kootamani =

- Theatrical release poster
- Directed by: A.J. Varghese
- Written by: Abhilash S. Nair; A.J. Varghese
- Produced by: Vijay Babu; Sandra Thomas
- Starring: Dhyan Sreenivasan; Namitha Pramod; Mukesh; Aju Varghese; Neeraj Madhav; Vineeth Mohan; Bijukuttan
- Cinematography: Ajay David Kachappilly
- Edited by: Lijo Paul
- Music by: Shaan Rahman
- Production companies: Carnival Pictures; Friday Film House
- Distributed by: Popcorn Entertainments
- Release date: 25 December 2015
- Running time: 131 minutes
- Country: India
- Language: Malayalam

Adi Kapyare Kootamani (transl. Hey Sexton, Ring the Long Bell) is a 2015 Indian Malayalam-language comedy-horror film co-written and directed by John Varghese and starring Dhyan Sreenivasan, Namitha Pramod, Aju Varghese, Vineeth Mohan, Neeraj Madhav, Mukesh and Bijukuttan. The film was jointly produced by Sandra Thomas and Vijay Babu under the banner of Friday Film House and Carnival Motion Pictures. The cinematography was handled by Ajay David Kachappilly, editing by Lijo Paul and music by Shaan Rahman, who composed both Background Score and Soundtrack.

It was released theatrically on 25 December 2015 to positive reviews and became a blockbuster.

== Plot ==
The movie starts with the introduction of Rev. Fr. Alfred Kattuvilayil, who considers himself a strict warden of a college boys hostel. His assistant, Shaanthappan, usually tries to show him the student's mischief but fails every time. Adishta Lakshmi fights with her father over her boyfriend and, the next day, meets Bhanu Prasad in the canteen at his college. Bhanu has lost his gold chain because he had to lend it to his friend, Harris, to get some money. Since he needs money, Lakshmi offers him 20,000 rupees for taking her to his hostel for some unknown reason that night.

Bhanu brings Lakshmi into the hostel, but by the time he tries to get her out, the way out has been blocked by some students. Both stay in Bhanu's room that night. Not fully trusting Bhanu, Lakshmi ties Bhanu to a table and sets an alarm on his phone for three o'clock in the morning, as by then everyone would be asleep. But both sleep off and wake up only by eight in the morning when Bhanu's friends, Bruno, Remo, and Koshi knock on the door. Bhanu skips college and tries to get her out, but it turns out that the escape route has been repaired and therefore, blocked by Fr. Alfred and Shanthappan. He tries to get her out through the main entrance of the hostel, but to his horror, the college is closed due to a strike that day. Hence, the students came back to the hostel, and Bhanu and Lakshmi ran back to his room. Meanwhile, Lakshmi's father finds the auto-rickshaw driver who dropped her off near the hostel. He thinks that she eloped with her boyfriend and starts searching the place along with his goons.

Both stay in Bhanu's room for the whole day and plan to escape through the terrace that night. When Bhanu goes to the terrace at night to check if the coast is clear, he sees a number of students, including Bruno, Koshi, and Remo, boozing. They force him to drink, and he forgets about Lakshmi locked in his room. When Shanthappan goes near Bhanu's room after some time, he hears Lakshmi speaking in her sleep in Tamil. He thinks that it is a ghost and gets the key from Bhanu's pocket and opens the door. Lakshmi kicks him and runs out of the room to Bruno's room, and Shanthappan is knocked out.

The next day, Bhanu wakes up, and Fr. Alfred is persuaded by Shanthappan to check Bhanu's room for the ghost. Bhanu opens the room reluctantly and is surprised to see that Lakshmi is not there. He then finds out that his friends have found out about Lakshmi and together, they plan to get her out. Lakshmi then tells them the reason why she came into the hostel. Her boyfriend, Premraj, stayed in this hostel, and after he broke up with her through a text, she wanted revenge. So she got into the hostel, went to his room, and slapped him. Meanwhile, Fr. Alfred and Shantappan start searching the inmates' rooms for booze, and a lot of hilarious events ensue when they move Lakshmi from room to room and make her hide in Koshi's room's sunshade to not get caught. Adding to this, at night, another hilarious scene comes up when Lakshmi wants to take a bath, and Bhanu figures out that Remo is trying to flirt with Lakshmi, and gets angry.

When they try to get her out through the terrace that night, Fr. Alfred and Shanthappan see her in a white dress, and they believe that she is a ghost. Fr. Alfred locks the terrace door being scared of the ghost, and Bhanu makes a new plan: to make everyone believe that there is actually a ghost and to summon her with Ouija board in the presence of Fr. Alfred. Lakshmi will pose as the ghost. When the Fr. Alfred performs an exorcism, the ghost will leave the hostel, and that way Adishta Lakshmi also can get out of the hostel. They butter up and get the father to perform an exorcism. They also plan and buy a lot of things from the market, such as fake blood and chemicals that generate smoke and mist, to scare their inmates. Meanwhile, Lakshmi's father's goons catch up to them after the auto driver sees them at the market but they beat up the goons and escape.

At night, Bhanu, Shantappan, and Fr. Alfred start using the Ouija board, but after some time, to Bhanu's shock, an actual ghost turns up. Meanwhile, Bruno, Remo, and Koshi do a lot of things to scare their inmates, such as randomly setting fire to things, throwing fake blood at people, and breaking the glasses, all while hiding, and successfully scare the inmates. Even though some supernatural events do occur, Lakshmi poses as the ghost and, after Fr. Alfred's exorcism, successfully gets out of the hostel as per the original plan. Meanwhile, the actual ghost is shown still wandering through the hostel, then suddenly appearing in the hallway and doing a jumpscare.

In the credits, Lakshmi is back home, and Bhanu visits her with her bag, which she had left in his room. She asks him if he has just come to give the bag or to say something else. Bhanu wanted to say he loves her, but Lakshmi has already figured it out. She tells him they will talk about it later and asks him to leave, but suddenly hears her father's voice and asks him to wait until three in the morning, when her father and his goons will have fallen asleep. Bhanu now realizes that he is trapped in her house, just as she was trapped in the hostel.

== Cast ==
- Dhyan Sreenivasan as Bhanu Prasad
- Namitha Pramod as Adishta Lakshmi
- Mukesh as Rev. Fr. Alfred Kattuvillayil
- Aju Varghese as Bruno
- Vineeth Mohan as Koshi
- Neeraj Madhav as Remo
- Bijukuttan as Shaanthappan
- John Vijay as Gowndar, Lakshmi's father
- Sabumon Abdusamad as Veluchaami
- Roshan Mathew as Premraj
- Devi Ajith as Adishta's mother
- Valsala Menon as Ammachi / Neighbour in deathbed
- Krishnan as The Auto Driver
- Disney James as Ammachi's son
- Anjali Aneesh as Upachana, Ammachi's daughter in-law
- Balaji Sarma as The Electrician (cameo)
- John Varghese as The Junior Student (cameo)
- Thomas Pattathanam as The New Admission Boy's father (cameo)
- Bhagath Manuel as Harris (cameo)
- Pradeep Kottayam as Bhanu Prasad's relative (cameo)

== Production ==
The filming commenced on 7 September at University Hostel Campus in Thiruvananthapuram. The title of the film Adi Kapyare Kootamani was revealed on 8 September 2015, Production Controller of Adi Kapyare Kootamani is handled by Shibu G Suseelan.

== Music ==
Adi Kapyare Kootamani

Soundtrack album by Shaan Rahman
- Released: 25 December 2015
- Recorded: 2015
- Genre: Feature film soundtrack
- Length: 11m 27s
- Language: Malayalam
- Label: Muzik 247

Shaan Rahman chronology
Oru Vadakkan Selfie (2015)	Adi Kapyare Kootamani (2015)	Vettah (2016)

Original Tracklist
No.	Title	Singer(s)	Length
1.	"Ende Maavum Poothe"	Vineeth Sreenivasan, Shaan Rahman, Arun Alat, Rzee (Rap)	3:52
2.	"Maruda"	Shaan Rahman, Arun Alat	3:52
3.	"Ullasa Gayike"	Vidhu Prathap, Shaan Rahman, Remya Nambeesan	3:43

== Reception ==
The film collected ₹2.24 crore (US$230,000) in three days of release, and subsequently grossed ₹4.6 crore (US$480,000) in a week.

Abhilash S Nair and John Varghese were nominated for the Best Script of a Comedy Film category at the 2nd Asianet Comedy Awards 2016

== Sequel ==
In December 2015, producer Vijay Babu confirmed that there would be a sequel to the film, titled Adi Kapyare Kootamani 2. It would be directed by John Varghese.

== Remake ==
The film was remade in Tamil in 2022 as Hostel, starring Ashok Selvan and Priya Bhavani Shankar in lead roles. The film was also remade in Telugu in 2023 as Jilebi and in Kannada in 2024 as Abbabba starring Likith Shetty and Amrutha Iyengar in lead roles.
