= Abbabba =

2024 film by K. M. Chaitanya

- Theatrical release poster
- Directed by: K. M. Chaitanya
- Written by: KL Rajashekar (Dialogue)
- Screenplay by: K.M. Chaitanya
- Based on: Adi Kapyare Kootamani (Malayalam) by John Varghese
- Produced by: Ann Augustine; Vijay Babu; Vivek Thomas
- Starring: Likith Shetty; Amrutha Iyengar
- Cinematography: Manohar Joshi
- Edited by: Haridoss
- Music by: Deepak Alexander
- Production companies: Miramar Films; Friday Film House
- Distributed by: KRG Studios
- Release date: 16 February 2024
- Running time: 126 minutes
- Country: India
- Language: Kannada

Abbabba (transl. Wow) is a 2024 Indian Kannada-language comedy horror film written and directed by K. M. Chaitanya and starring Likith Shetty and Amrutha Iyengar in lead roles. Film was Produced by Malayalam actress Ann Augustine, Vijay Babu and Vivek Thomas under banner of Miramar Films and Friday Film House. The film is a remake of the 2015 Malayalam film Adi Kapyare Kootamani. The music was composed by Deepak Alexander, while the cinematography and editing were handled by Manohar Joshi and Haridoss respectively.

Abbabba was theatrically released on 16 February 2024, where it received positive reviews from critics.

== Plot ==
The movie starts with the introduction of Father Joseph who considers himself a strict warden of a college boys hostel. His assistant, Kempanna, usually tries to show him the mischief of the students but fails all the time. Akhila fights with her father Rowdy Gopal Reddy, over her boyfriend and the next day, meets Dileep, in the canteen of his college. Dileep struggle to save his love, Sharmila who about to get married Police Inspector son due her father's financial losses. Since he needs money, to Sharmila's father and save him goons, Akhila offers help for taking her to his hostel for some unknown reason that night.

Dileep brings Akhila into the hostel, but by the time he tries to get her out, the way out has been blocked by some students. Both stay in Dileep room that night. Not fully trusting Dileep, Akhila ties Dileep to a chair and sets an alarm on his phone for three o'clock in the morning, as by then everyone would be asleep. But both sleep off since the alarm is a lullaby and wake up only by eight in the morning when Dileep friends, Rahu, Kethu, and Tandhav, knock on the door. Dileep skips college and tries to get her out, but it turns out that the escape route has been repaired and therefore, blocked by Father and Kempanna. He tries to get her out through the main entrance of the hostel but to his horror, the college is closed due to a strike that day. Hence, the students came back to the hostel, and Dileep and Akhila run back to his room. Meanwhile, Akhila father finds the auto-rickshaw driver who dropped her off near the hostel. He thinks that she eloped with her boyfriend and starts searching the place along with his goons.

Both stay in Karthi's room for the whole day and plan to escape through the terrace that night. When Karthi goes to the terrace at night to check if the coast is clear, he sees a number of students, including Rahu, Kethu, and Tandav, boozing. They force him to drink, and he forgets about Akhila locked in his room. When drunken Kempanna goes near Karthi's room after some time, he hears Akhila speaking in her sleep. He thinks that it is a ghost and gets the key from Karthi's pocket and opens the door. Akhila kicks him and runs out of the room to Kethu's room, and Kempanna is knocked out.

The next day, Karthik wakes up, and Father is persuaded by Kempanna to check Karthi's room for the ghost. Karthi opens the room reluctantly and is surprised to see that Akhila is not there. He then finds out that his friends have found out about Akhila and together, they plan to get her out. Akhila then tells them the reason why she came into the hostel. Her boyfriend, Premraj, stayed in this hostel, and after he broke up with her through a text, she wanted revenge. So she got into the hostel, went to his room, and slapped him. Meanwhile, Father and Kempanna start searching the inmates' rooms for booze, and a lot of hilarious events ensue when they move Akhila from room to room and make her hide in Rahu's room's sunshade to not get caught. Adding to this, at night, another hilarious scene comes up when Akhila wants to take a bath, and Karthi figures out that Rahu is trying to flirt with Akhila, and gets angry.

When they try to get her out through the terrace that night, Father and Kempanna see her in a white dress, and they believe that she is a ghost. The Father locks the terrace door being scared of the ghost, and Karthi makes a new plan: to make everyone believe that there is actually a ghost and to summon her with Ouija board in the presence of Father. Akhila will pose as the ghost. When the Father performs an exorcism, the ghost will leave the hostel, and that way Akhila also can get out of the hostel. They butter up and get the father to perform an exorcism. They also plan and buy a lot of things from the market, such as fake blood and chemicals that generate smoke and mist, to scare their inmates. Meanwhile, Akhila's father's goons catch up to them after the auto driver sees them at the market but they beat up the goons and escape.

At night, Karthik, Kempanna, and Father start using the Ouija board, but after some time, to Karthi's shock, an actual ghost turns up. Meanwhile, Tandav, Rahu, and Kethu do a lot of things to scare their inmates, such as randomly setting fire to things, throwing fake blood at people, and breaking the glasses, all while hiding, and successfully scare the inmates. Even though some supernatural events do occur, Akhila poses as the ghost and after Father's exorcism, successfully gets out of the hostel as per the original plan. Meanwhile, the actual ghost is shown still wandering through the hostel, then suddenly appearing in the hallway and doing a jumpscare.

In the credits, Akhila is back in her home, and Karthi visits her with her bag which she had forgotten in his room. She asks him if he has just come to give the bag or to say something else. Karthi wanted to say he loves her but Akhila has already figured it out. She tells him that they will talk about it later and asks him to leave but suddenly hears her father's voice and asks him to wait until three in the morning when her father and his goons would have slept. Karthi now realizes that he is trapped in her house just like how she was trapped in the hostel.

== Cast ==
- Likith Shetty as Dileep
- Amrutha Iyengar as Akhila
- Ajay Raj as Rahul "Rahu"
- Tandhav Ram as Tandhav
- Dhanraj Achar as Kethan "Kethu"
- Sharath Lohitashwa as Father Joseph
- Vijay Chendoor as Kempanna
- Avinash as Rowdy Gopal Reddy, Akhila's father
- Anusha Rai as Sharmila, Dileep's girlfriend
- Sudha Belawadi as Akhila's Mother
- Nagaraj Kote as Auto Driver
- Sihi Kahi Chandru
- Vijay Babu
- Ann Augustine
- Dileep

== Music ==
Abbabba

Soundtrack album by Deepak Alexander
- Released: 2024
- Recorded: 2022–2023
- Genre: Feature film soundtrack
- Length: 8:25
- Language: Kannada
- Label: PRK Audio
- Producer: Deepak Alexander

Deepak Alexander chronology
In the Name of God (2021)	Abbabba (2024)

The music was composed by Deepak Alexander.

Original Tracklist
No.	Title	Lyrics	Singer(s)	Length
1.	"Abbabba- Title Track"	All Ok	All Ok	3:21
2.	"Ayyayyo"	Kaviraj	Vijay Yesudas	2:41
3.	"Odu Odu"	Dhananjaya KA	Vasishta Simha	2:23
Total length:				8:25
