= Barfee =

Barfee or Barfée can refer to:

- Barfi, a milk and nut sweet from the Indian subcontinent
- Barfi!, a 2012 Indian film
- Barfi (film), a 2013 Indian film
- William Barfée (pronounced barf-AY), a character from the musical The 25th Annual Putnam County Spelling Bee

== See also ==
- Barfi (disambiguation)
