= Family Pack (2022 film) =

- Official poster
- Directed by: Arjun Kumar S.
- Written by: Arjun Kumar .S.
- Produced by: Ashwini Puneeth Rajkumar
- Starring: Likith Shetty; Amrutha Iyengar; Rangayana Raghu; Achyuth Kumar
- Cinematography: Shreesha Kuduvalli; Uday Leela
- Edited by: Deepu S. Kumar
- Music by: Gurukiran; Viraj Kannadiga
- Production company: PRK Productions
- Distributed by: Amazon Prime Video
- Release date: 17 February 2022
- Country: India
- Language: Kannada

Family Pack is a 2022 Indian Kannada language comedy film directed by Arjun Kumar S., who previously directed Sankashta Kara Ganapathi. The film stars Likith Shetty, Amrutha Iyengar, Rangayana Raghu, and Achyuth Kumar. The film follows two families and a human-like ghost played by Rangayana Raghu. The film premiered on Amazon Prime Video.

== Plot ==
Abhi encounters a ghost when he had lost hope to live. The ghost helps him by granting him a new life. But things get complicated when the ghost realizes that their lives and destinies intervene on a deeper level.

== Cast ==
- Likith Shetty as Abhi
- Amrutha Iyengar as Bhoomika aka Baby Boo
- Rangayana Raghu as Manjunath/Manjanna
- Achyuth Kumar as Abhi's father
- Padmaja Rao as Abhi's mother
- Sihi Kahi Chandru
- Sadhu Kokila as Krishna
- Dattanna
- Tilak
- Shivaram
- Sharmitha Gowda
- Chandu Gowda
- Jahangir
- Nagabhushan
- Raghu Ramanakoppa
- Sujay Shastri
- Mahantesh Hiremath
- Shruthi Ramesh
- Santosh Shetty
- Nischitha Shetty

== Production ==
After the success of Sunkastha Kara Ganapathi, director Arjun Kumar and actor Likith Shetty reunited for this project. Although they struggled to find producers at first, Puneeth Rajkumar and his wife Ashwini later decided to produce the film under their banner PRK Productions. Shooting began in September 2020, and it finished in July 2021.

== Soundtrack ==
The song "Biddalappo" was composed by Gurukiran, sung by Chintan Vikas and was written by V. Manohar. The song "Bekagide" was composed, written, and sung by Viraj Kannadiga.

== Reception ==
A. Sharadhaa of The New Indian Express opined that "Family Pack is a comfort watch with a message". Jagadish Angadi of Deccan Herald wrote that "'Family Pack' has shortcomings but the film's twist and turns are placed well. The eventful second half makes up for the snail-paced first half. The film could have worked towards being an endearing tale of human emotions". Sowmya Rajendran of The News Minute stated that "At under two hours, Family Pack feels like an endurance test that most are likely to fail unless they're film critics with rhino hides who've been subjected to one too many bad films in their lifetime". Sunayana Suresh of The Times of India said that "Family Pack is one of those films that is unapologetic when it comes to its comedy. And this is its biggest strength. Director Arjun Kumar delivers yet another funny film".
