= PRK Productions =

Indian film production company

- Type: Private Limited company
- Industry: Motion pictures
- Founded: July 20, 2017; 9 years ago
- Founder: Puneeth Rajkumar
- Headquarters: Bangalore, India
- Key people: Ashwini Puneeth Rajkumar
- Products: Film production
- Services: Film production Music
- Subsidiaries: PRK Audio

PRK Productions is an Indian film production company founded by Puneeth Rajkumar and managed by his wife, Ashwini Puneeth Rajkumar.

== History ==
PRK Productions was founded on 20 July 2017. The production house made its feature film debut with Kavaludaari (2019), a neo-noir thriller film starring Rishi and Anant Nag. The studio's next film was Mayabazar 2016 (2020), which featured an ensemble cast of Raj B. Shetty, Vasishta N. Simha, and Prakash Raj. Due to the COVID-19 pandemic, the production house's next two ventures, Law and French Biriyani, were directly released on Amazon Prime Video in 2020. Law marked the film debut of Ragini, Prajwal Devaraj's wife. French Biriyani starred Danish Sait and Sal Yusuf marked the film debut of TikToker Disha Madan.

The next three films of the banner- One Cut Two Cut starring Danish Sait, Family Pack starring Likith Shetty and Amrutha Iyengar and Man of the Match directed by D.Satya Prakash of Rama Rama Re fame were a direct release on Amazon Prime Video. Their next release was Gandhadagudi, the last film of late Puneeth Rajkumar, directed by the National Award winner AmoghaVarasha JS.

Ashwini took over the production house fully after Puneeth's death in October 2021 and continued their objective of supporting and bring in fresh faces and ideas into the industry. In 2023, they released the comedy drama movie Aachar & Co. directed and acted by Sindhu Sreenivas Murthy with a majority of cast as newbies and women. The movie opened to positive to mixed reviews from critics but ran to full theatres with family audience across Karnataka for around 25 days.

To celebrate the birth anniversary of Puneeth, Ashwini joined hands with KRG Studios to re-release one of his most celebrated movie Jackie on 15 March 2024.

== Filmography ==
Key
†	Denotes films that have not yet been released

List of film credits
Year	Title	Director	Cast	Notes	Ref.
2019	Kavaludaari	Hemanth M. Rao	Rishi, Anant Nag, Roshni Prakash, Achyuth Kumar		
2020	Mayabazar 2016	Radhakrishna Reddy	Raj.B.Shetty, Vasishta, Achyuth Kumar, Chaithra Rao		
2020	Law	Raghu Samarth	Ragini Prajwal		
2020	French Biriyani	Pannaga Bharana	Danish Sait, Sal Yusuf		
2022	One Cut Two Cut	Vamshidhar Bhograj	Danish Sait, Samyukta Hornad		
2022	Family Pack	Arjun Kumar S	Likith Shetty, Amrutha Iyengar		
2022	Man of the Match	D. Satya Prakash	Nataraj S Bhat, Dharmanna Kadooru		
2022	Gandhada Gudi	Amoghavarsha JS	Puneeth Rajkumar, Amoghavarsha JS		
2023	Aachar & Co	Sindhu Srinivasa Murthy	Sindhu Srinivasa Murthy, Ashok, Sudha Belawadi and others		
2024	O2	Raaghav Nayak; Prashanth Raj	Ashika Rangnath, Praveen Tej and Others		
2025	Ekka	Rohit Padaki	Yuva Rajkumar, Sanjana Anand, Sampada Hulivana		
