= Barfi (disambiguation) =

Barfi is a dense milk based sweet confectionery from South Asia. It may also refer to:

- Barfi!, 2012 Indian film in Hindi
  - Barfi! (soundtrack)
- Barfi (Kannada film), 2013 Indian film in Kannada

== See also ==
- Barfee (disambiguation)
