= Legal drama =

Subgenre of dramatic fiction

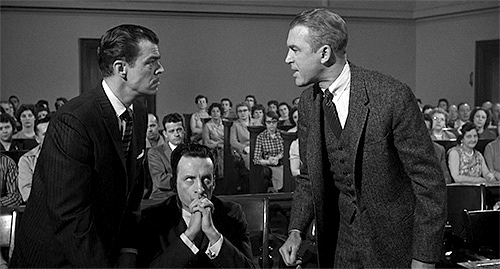
Scene from the 1959 American courtroom drama film Anatomy of a Murder

Legal drama, also called courtroom drama or law procedural, is a genre of film and television that generally focuses on narratives regarding legal practice and the justice system. The American Film Institute (AFI) defines "courtroom drama" as a genre of film in which a system of justice plays a critical role in the film's narrative. Legal dramas have also followed the lives of the fictional attorneys, defendants, plaintiffs, or other persons related to the practice of law present in television show or film. Legal drama is distinct from police crime drama or detective fiction, which typically focus on police officers or detectives investigating and solving crimes. The focal point of legal dramas, more often, are events occurring within a courtroom, but may include any phases of legal procedure, such as jury deliberations or work done at law firms. Some legal dramas fictionalize real cases which have been litigated, such as the play turned into a movie, Inherit the Wind fictionalizing the Scopes Monkey Trial. As a genre, the term "legal drama" is usually applied to television shows and films, whereas legal thrillers typically refer to novels and plays.

== Themes ==
Legal dramas typically portray moral dilemmas that occur with the practice of the law or participating in the justice system, many of which mirrors dilemmas in real life. The American Bar Association Journal has interpreted the public's enjoyment of legal dramas occur because "stories about the legal system are laced with human vulnerability." Indeed, even though "there are no car chases [and]... [g]uns are never drawn", legal dramas retain strong followings because of their presentation of moral intrigue in a setting that actually reflects what occurs in the world.

Legal dramas may present stories of the miscarriages of justice, such as persons wrongly convicted of a crime they did not commit. At times, stories may involve the moral implications of police misconduct, such as placing or tampering with evidence, such as in the 1993 film In the Name of the Father. More often, legal dramas focus on the attorneys' point of view when faced with these difficulties. For instance, in The Practice, a television legal drama series revolving around a firm of criminal defense attorneys, a common theme presented is the difficulty of defending clients known or believed to be guilty.

Finally, many legal dramas present themes that reflect politicized issues. In the 1960 film, Inherit the Wind, the politicized issue portrayed was the legality of a Tennessee statute that made it unlawful to teach the theory of evolution in a public school. As laws and public policy opinions change, so do the themes presented in legal dramas. The 1992 film A Few Good Men explored the psychology of superior orders, e.g. excusing criminal actions because they were only committed from 'following orders'. The film Philadelphia (1993) addressed homophobia, and the discrimination and public fear of HIV/AIDs carriers. In 1996, The People vs. Larry Flynt portrays the early years of Hustler Magazine and issues of obscenity and freedom of speech. You Don't Know Jack (2010) is a fictional biographic film about Dr. Jack Kevorkian and the legal actions he faced as a result of providing euthanasia services to terminal patients. Racial injustice remains a common theme from as far back as To Kill a Mockingbird in 1962 to the 2017 film Marshall.

== History ==
Legal drama in American film has an extensive history stemming from as early as the 1908 film, Falsely Accused! The 1950s and 1960s presented a number of legal drama films including, 12 Angry Men (1957), Witness for the Prosecution (1957), I Want to Live! (1958), Anatomy of a Murder (1959), The Young Philadelphians (1959), Compulsion (1959), Inherit the Wind (1960), Judgment at Nuremberg (1961), and To Kill a Mockingbird (1962). Arguably, 12 Angry Men and To Kill a Mockingbird stand as the cornerstones of early legal dramas, garnering extensive acclaim, recognition, and awards. Despite underwhelming box office performance, 12 Angry Men was nominated in three different categories at the 30th Academy Awards and appears on half of the AFI 100 Years... series lists of films, which celebrate the greatest films in American cinema. Likewise, To Kill a Mockingbird received even more acclaim, garnering three academy awards out of eight total nominations at the 35th Academy Awards, appears on seven of the AFI's ten lists celebrating the greatest films, including ranking as the best courtroom drama, and selected for preservation United States National Film Registry by the Library of Congress as being "culturally, historically, or aesthetically significant". Other countries also premiered legal dramas or courtrooms dramas in the early 1900s, such as the French silent film The Passion of Joan of Arc (1928).

Other legal drama films have not focused on even the practice of law, such as Paper Chase, a film presenting the difficulty and anxiety of entering law school.

== Legal thrillers ==
=== Lawyers in legal thriller films ===
Legal thriller films provide introspection into the life of a lawyer and legal professionals.

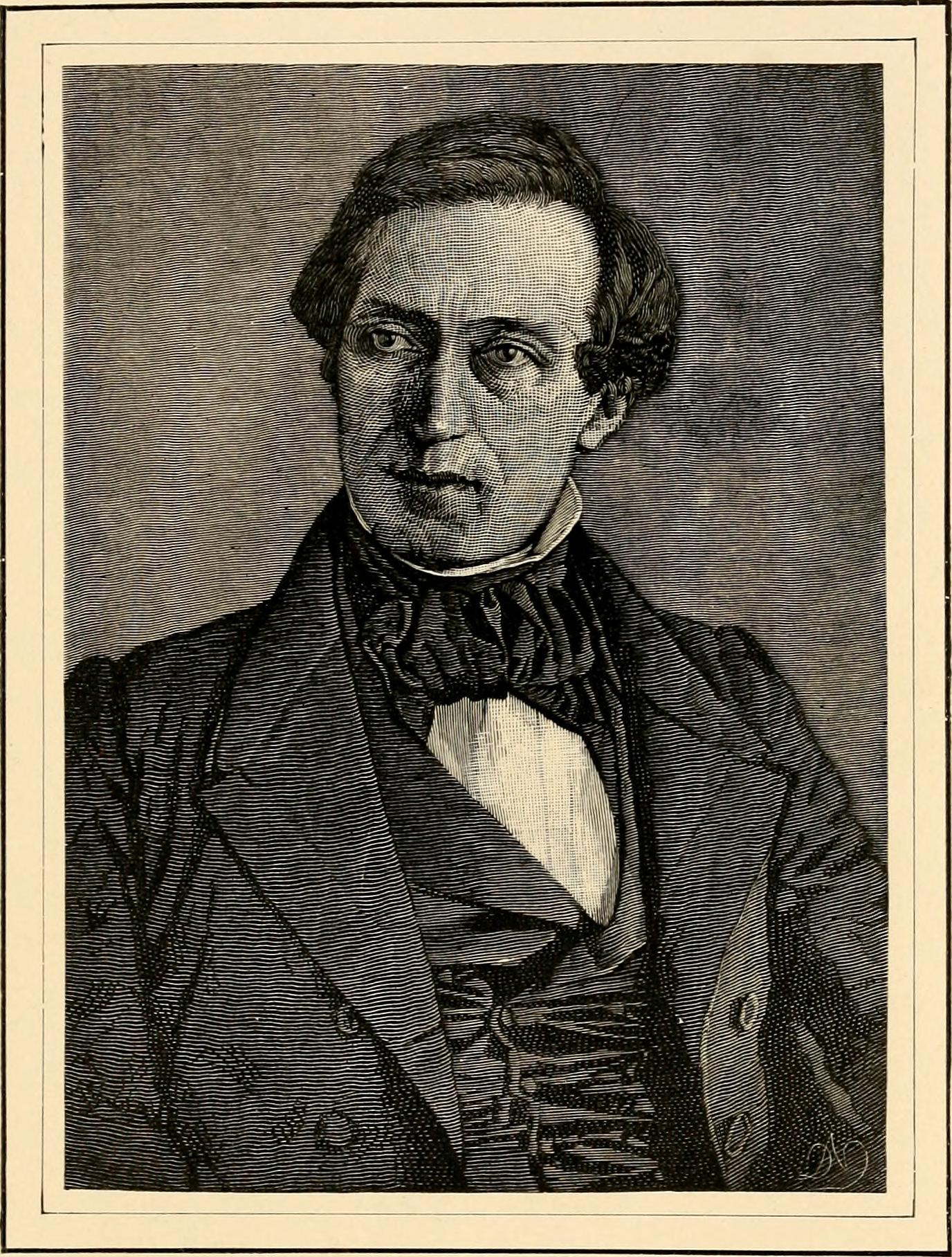
"Lincoln the Lawyer" a Representation of the Nature of Lawyers in Film

Within films, the central character is often engaged in professional work and experiences an obstacle that they have to overcome such as a client's case. The character confronts problems with their personal life and work, as it is under threat by the complex case, creating and series of action and courtroom battles.

The problems that characters face are evident within reviews of films such as The Judge, where family dynamics strain after a lawyer returns home for his mother's funeral. Reviews from the New York Times comment on the film's transformation into a crime story, characteristic of the legal thriller. The film itself unfolds the legal thriller's ideal courtroom drama style. The film takes place in what is deemed as a "nostalgia-tinged town". Further films such as The Lincoln Lawyer have also met similar reviews from Roger Ebert, commenting on the love of three elements in the film: courtroom scene, old cars, and tangled criminals. The 2019 film, Dark Waters raises an ethical dilemma of lawyers often choosing sides within films, as the defense lawyer has to switch sides to defend a poisoned community. He risks his future, community, and life by dealing with the case, characteristic of the legal thriller.

=== Film examples ===
The film Mangrove shows the inequalities and injustices prevalent through Britain's Caribbean history. Steve McQueen was the first black director of an Academy winning best picture with 12 Years a Slave. The five-part anthology, featuring Mangrove as the first visualizes courtroom drama and heroism, characterizing the legal thriller genre. McQueen made his film resemble a landmark of the civil rights trial against black activists. The film uses the characteristics of the legal thriller genre through a powerhouse courtroom drama and focusing on racial justice. The power divide between two opposing sides is intended to shape transformative victory, as audiences can learn about diversity.

A Fall from Grace also features the challenge often taken by lawyers in legal thriller films. For example, a young public defender has to handle the challenging case of a woman charged with murdering her husband. The film features elements of a conventional courtroom drama, such as the heroic lawyer, shady characters, and a law firm setting. Within the film, there are plot twist characteristics of the legal thriller genre. Furthermore, the film Law has ample court scenes and features a character taking on the fight for justice. The film defies the stereotypical expectations of women through featuring the main character as a woman who wants to speak openly about gang rape victimization.

The recognition of injustice is another emerging aspect of legal thriller films. Marshall is another example of a legal thriller film, where the lawyer is feature as the main character, traveling the country on behalf of the NAACP to defend black men who are accused of crimes. The film features a courtroom scene where violence occurs in retrieving the confession of a client and the difficulty to obtain the truth. As a film review reveals, flashbacks are used as a key film technique to craft outrage. The courtroom scenes are considered suspenseful and the setting of the 1940s shows a stage where people threw a facade with fake costumes and bright lights. Racism is exposed as a critical social justice issue explored where the truth demands a voice.

=== Legal thriller films ===
Summaries:

Year	Name	Language
1959	Anatomy of a Murder	English
1985	Jagged Edge	English
1987	Suspect	English
1989	True Believer	English
1990	Presumed Innocent	English
1990	Mounam Sammadhan	Tamil
1992	A Few Good Men	English
1993	The Firm	English
1993	The Pelican Brief	English
1993	Guilty as Sin	English
1994	The Client	English
1996	Primal Fear	English
1996	A Time to Kill	English
1997	The Devil's Advocate	English
1997	Amistad	English
1997	The Rainmaker	English
1998	A Civil Action	English
1998	Shadow of Doubt	English
2002	High Crimes	English
2003	Runaway Jury	English
2004	Reversible Errors	English
2007	Michael Clayton	English
2007	Fracture	English
2009	Beyond a Reasonable Doubt	English
2011	The Lincoln Lawyer	English
2013	Silence	Malayalam
2014	The Judge	English
2016	Manithan	Tamil
2017	The Third Murder	Japanese
2017	Marshall	English
2019	Section 375	Hindi
2019	Dark Waters	English
2019	Extremely Wicked, Shockingly Evil, and Vile	English
2020	Nabab LLB	Bangla
2020	A Fall from Grace	English
2020	The Trial of the Chicago 7	English
2020	Law	Kannada
2020	Mangrove	English
2020	Worth	English
2021	Jai Bhim	Tamil
2024	Juror #2	English

== Television ==
Early American television programs considered legal dramas include Perry Mason, The Defenders, Judd, for the Defense, Owen Marshall, Counselor at Law, The Bold Ones: The Lawyers, Petrocelli, and Matlock. More recent examples of serious legal dramas are Murder One, The Practice, Law & Order, L.A. Law, The Good Wife and Pearson.

The examples of legal comedy dramas are Ally McBeal and Boston Legal, both of which David E. Kelley created and produced, with Suits as one of the most popular legal drama during the 2010s. Better Call Saul also achieved popularity following its first season in 2015.

Legal dramas are becoming more in demand from the public, more popular for many people to watch, and beginning to feature stronger female leads.

There are also the British television courtroom dramas, which consist of Rumpole of the Bailey, Kavanagh QC and Judge John Deed, broadcast by ITV and the BBC respectively.

== Inaccurate portrayal of legal practice ==
It is widely believed by most practicing lawyers that legal dramas result in the general public having misconceptions about the legal process. Many of these misconceptions result from the desire to create an interesting story. For example, because conflict between parties make for an interesting story, legal dramas emphasize the trial and ignore the fact that the vast majority of civil and criminal cases in the United States are settled out of court. Trials in legal dramas are often shown to be more emphatic by disregarding actual rules in trials that prevent prejudicing defendants from juries.

Besides the actual practice of law, legal dramas may also misrepresent the character of lawyers in general. The lawyers in question fall under different character representations, including: the zealous heroic lawyers fighting to save their client's case or put criminals in jail; the sleazy, distrustful attorney performing morally questionable acts to win the case; and the conflicted lawyer who is forced into a moral dilemma of having to defend a guilty client. These representations are not reflective of how lawyers act in real life as their job is to remain neutral to the law and ensure every person gets a fair and equal trial, regardless of their guilt.

Speaking at a screening of 12 Angry Men during the 2010 Fordham University Law School Film festival, US Supreme Court Justice Sonia Sotomayor stated that seeing 12 Angry Men while she was in college influenced her decision to pursue a career in law. She was particularly inspired by immigrant Juror 11's monologue on his reverence for the American justice system. She also told the audience of law students that, as a lower-court judge, she would sometimes instruct juries to not follow the film's example, because most of the jurors' conclusions are based on speculation, not fact. Sotomayor noted that events from the film such as entering a similar knife into the proceeding; performing outside research into the case matter in the first place; and ultimately the jury as a whole making broad, wide-ranging assumptions far beyond the scope of reasonable doubt would not be allowed in a real-life jury situation, and would in fact have yielded a mistrial (assuming, of course, that applicable law permitted the content of jury deliberations to be revealed).

== See also ==
- Bleak House
- Courtroom drama films
- Crime comics
- Crime fiction
- Detective fiction
- Dramatized court show
- Legal television series
- List of police television dramas
- Police procedural
- Trial film
- Whodunit
