= Ayyana Mane =

2025 Indian crime thriller series

- Promotional poster
- Genre: Crime thriller
- Created by: Shruti Naidu
- Directed by: Ramesh Indira
- Starring: Kushee Ravi; Manasi Sudhir; Kushi Chandrashekar; Archana Kottige; Ramesh Indira
- Music by: L.V. Muthu Ganesh
- Country of origin: India
- Original language: Kannada
- No. of seasons: 2
- No. of episodes: 12

Production
- Producer: Shruti Naidu
- Cinematography: Rahul Roy
- Editor: Rajendra Urs
- Running time: 18-20 minutes

Original release
- Network: ZEE5

Ayyana Mane is a 2025 Kannada-language crime thriller series directed by Ramesh Indira and produced by Shruthi Naidu Productions. It stars Kushee Ravi, Akshya Nayak, Manasi Sudhir, Vijay Shobraj, and Ramesh Indira himself. The storyline revolves around a newly married woman who enters her husband’s ancestral house, only to uncover a chilling pattern of unexplained deaths and deep-rooted family secrets.

Following the success of the first season, Zee 5 renewed the series for a second season. The second season premieres on October 23, 2026.

== Premise ==
The story follows Jaji (played by Kushee Ravi), a young woman who marries into a family haunted by a dark past. Three of the family’s daughters-in-law have mysteriously died under suspicious circumstances in the same ancestral mansion. As Jaji settles into her new life, she begins to uncover the unsettling history tied to the house. With the help of a loyal housekeeper and a determined police officer, Jaji begins to investigate the deaths. The family believes the deaths are the result of a curse tied to their deity, but Jaji starts to suspect there may be something far more sinister at play. The series explores themes of power, betrayal, and survival as Jaji races against time to uncover the truth while dealing with the social pressures of her new life.

== Cast ==
- Kushee Ravi as Jaji
- Manasi Sudhir as Nagamma a.k.a. Nagalambike
- Khushi Chandrashekar as Pushpavthi
- Archana Kottige as Charulatha
- Ramesh Indira as Lakshman Jaagidhar
- Sihi Kahi Chandru
- Roopesh Shetty

== Episodes ==
=== Series overview ===
Series	Episodes	Originally released	Network
1	6	25 April 2025	Zee 5
2	6	23 October 2026	Zee 5

=== Season 1 (2025) ===
No.	Title	Directed by	Original release date
1	"Jaaji Enters Ayyana Mane"	Ramesh Indira	25 April 2025
Jaaji arrives at her new home after her wedding, only to witness a sudden tragedy that shakes the entire family. As she begins to settle in, eerie secrets buried in the house begin to surface.
2	"Whispers From The Well"	Ramesh Indira	25 April 2025
Jaaji uncovers disturbing details about a mysterious death linked to the family. As she delves deeper, she faces a dilemma — to walk away or to pursue the truth hiding behind closed doors.
3	"The Woman Before Me"	Ramesh Indira	25 April 2025
Revelations about Dushyantha’s past haunt Jaaji, forcing her to question her family's role in the marriage. The deeper she digs, the more she realizes the extent of the deception.
4	"Blood Money"	Ramesh Indira	25 April 2025
A shocking financial revelation and a new death in the family push Jaaji to confide in a friend within the police. The mystery grows darker with every discovery.
5	"The Root Cause"	Ramesh Indira	25 April 2025
As the investigation progresses, suspicions fall on Tayavva. Jaaji begins to piece together connections between the recent events and long-hidden secrets.
6	"I'm The Princess"	Ramesh Indira	25 April 2025
In an effort to restore peace, the family visits a sacred temple. Meanwhile, tensions rise back at home between Jaaji and Nagalambike. Will the family’s curse finally come to an end?

=== Season 2 (2026) ===
No.	Title	Directed by	Original release date
1	"What Happened to Nagalambike ?"	Ramesh Indira	23 October 2026
As Mahalaya Amavasye nears, strange signs unsettle Ayyana Mane, as long-buried secrets stir awake.
2	"Karna Pichachi"	Ramesh Indira	23 October 2026
Bad omens spread fear, doubts deepen, and a divided family struggles to face an unsettling truth.
3	"Good News"	Ramesh Indira	23 October 2026
A joyous wedding lights up Ayyana Mane, but a Deepavali tragedy leaves the family shattered.
4	"Is Kondayya Angry?"	Ramesh Indira	23 October 2026
With the protector gone, Jaaji struggles with grief. Kondayya fails to shield Ayyana Mane.
5	"The Big Clue"	Ramesh Indira	23 October 2026
Old wounds resurface as a baby goes missing, but a wedding card changes everything.
6	"The Final Showdown"	Ramesh Indira	23 October 2026
The handwriting expert is proven right as Kondayya’s arrival reveals the truth.

== Release ==
Ayyana Mane began streaming on ZEE5 from 25 April 2025.

=== Season 1 ===

Season 1 of Ayyana Mane premiered on ZEE5 on April 25, 2025, receiving mixed reviews from critics. While reviewers praised its atmospheric premise, regional folklore elements tied to local deity worship (Kondayya), and strong performances by Kushee Ravi and Manasi Sudhir, some felt the execution leaned heavily into a conventional TV soap opera format. Writing for India Today, critics gave the series 3 out of 5 stars, praising its crisp, compact episode runtimes and brisk pacing that made it an easy binge-watch. Praise was also directed toward Rahul Roy’s cinematography and LV Muthu Ganesh's background score for successfully establishing an eerie, moody backdrop. Conversely, OTTplay critiqued the show for conventional writing choices and melodrama, arguing that the narrative occasionally undermined its own suspense-thriller potential. The Hindu termed it passable.

=== Season 2 ===
Season 2 received a significantly stronger and more favorable critical response compared to its predecessor. Reviewers commended the shift away from ambient supernatural ambiguity toward a tighter, more calculated investigative whodunnit.

In a positive review, The New Indian Express highlighted that the second season successfully tied up loose ends and visual clues left behind in the first chapter. The technical craft—particularly the naturalistic lighting, disciplined editing by Rajendra Urs, and a sound design focused on low ambient dread—was credited with elevating the sequel into a sharp, well-paced psychological thriller.
