= One Cut Two Cut =

- Poster
- Directed by: Vamsidhar Bhogaraju
- Written by: Vamsidhar Bhogaraju; Danish Sait
- Produced by: Ashwini Puneeth Rajkumar; Gurudath A. Talwar
- Starring: Danish Sait; Prakash Belawadi; Samyukta Hornad
- Cinematography: Sahit Anand
- Edited by: Sahit Anand
- Music by: Nakul Abhyankar
- Production company: PRK Productions
- Distributed by: Amazon Prime Video
- Release date: 3 February 2022
- Running time: 89 minutes
- Country: India
- Language: Kannada

One Cut Two Cut is a 2022 Indian Kannada-language comedy film written and directed by Vamsidhar Bhogaraju. The film stars Danish Sait, who plays the role of arts and craft teacher. Prakash Belawadi, Samyukta Hornad plays in pivotal roles. The film is produced by Ashwini Puneeth Rajkumar and Gurudath A Talwar of PRK Productions. It was released on 3 February 2022 on Amazon Prime Video.

== Plot ==
Gopi is a mild-mannered and soft-spoken arts and crafts teacher who works at the Bytarayanapura school. Due to the nature of his work, he does not earn much and is ridiculed by his neighbor. Meanwhile, ex-radio host Pruthviraj plans to organize a protest against the government to earn fame on social media and become more popular than Amitabh Bachchan, whom he envies. But, nobody turns up for the protest except for Ayan a struggling stand-up comedian, Neha, a fashion blogger, and Gurudev an ex-serviceman. The four decide to take drastic steps to force the government to fulfill their demands.

Meanwhile, Gopi reaches the school and finds that the teachers are unenthusiastic about teaching the children. He also bumps into Nagaveni a teacher at the school and the woman he likes. It is revealed that Gopi and his late mother once visited Nagaveni's house to ask her hand in marriage but was rejected by her father due to his educational qualifications. Gopi entertains the students by making origami but his fun session is soon interrupted by the four silly radical activists (wearing tracksuits and masks) who plan to hold the school hostage until their demands are met. Gopi becomes the translator between the activists and the CM's secretary.

The secretary thinks of it as a joke but realizes the gravity of the situation when he gets a selfie of the hijackers with a gun. The hijackers demand the resignation of the CM but later agree to give a formal list of demands (all of which are absurd). This incident is picked up by news anchor Komala (Soundarya Nagaraj), but she is forced to broadcast meaningless news by her boss instead of this. The secretary, realizing how this event can affect the upcoming elections decides to end the issue quietly by ordering a secret agent(Vamsidhar Bhogaraju) and his 'elite' team to eliminate the hijackers. The film then focuses on the three parties and how incredibly ridiculous their day is.

By nightfall, the silly hijackers realize their plan will yield no fruitful results, and decide to escape before they are arrested. However, Pruthviraj is reluctant and gets increasingly agitated. All this is captured secretly by Komala who resigns when her boss does not allow her to broadcast her footage. The 'elite' team finally ends up at the wrong school and Pruthviraj ends up shooting Gopi in the back. Finally, all the parties head home in the ambulance carrying Gopi and the silly activists formally apologize for the hijacking. Gopi informs the relieved secretary about the end of the situation and requests him to improve the conditions of the government school. Gopi even lies to the secret agent about not knowing who the hijackers were and everyone goes home happy.

The film ends by showing how all the activists have mended their ways and how Nagaveni has ended up marrying another person instead of Gopi.

== Cast ==
- Danish Sait as Gopi, art and craft teacher
- Prakash Belawadi as Pruthviraj, working in All India Radio and hates Amitabh Bachhan
- Samyukta Hornad as Nagaveni, school teacher
- Vineeth Beep Kumar as Ayan, struggling stand-up comedian
- Roopa Rayappa as Neha, fashion blogger
- Manoj Sputnique Sengupta as Gurudev, ex-serviceman
- Aruna Balraj as Hindi Teacher
- Sampath Maitreya as CM's Secretary
- Ashwin Hasan as Murty, News Channel Owner
- Vamsidhar Bhogaraju as Special Agent
- Rishi as Groom who marries Nagaveni, special appearance

== Soundtrack ==
One Cut Two Cut

Soundtrack album by Nakul Abhyankar
- Released: 2022
- Recorded: 2022
- Genre: Feature film soundtrack
- Length: 12:50
- Language: Kannada
- Label: PRK Audio
- Producer: Nakul Abhyankar

Singles from One Cut Two Cut
- 1. "Yaava Swargadinda" Released: 31 January 2022

Music composed by Nakul Abhyankar. First were released on 31 January 2022.

Tracklist
No.	Title	Lyrics	Singer(s)	Length
1.	"Yaava Swargadinda"	Nischal Dambekodi,	Benny Dayal, Ramya Bhat	2:49
2.	"Yes! it's you"	Lavitha Dobo	Benny Dayal	2:35
3.	"One Cut Two Cut (Title song)"	MoMo Media		1:50
4.	"One Cut Two Cut(SAV)"		Nakul Abhyankar, Vamsidhar Bhogaraju	2:39
5.	"Gilli Gilli"	Nakul Abhyankar	Nakul Abhyankar	1:58
