= Full Meals =

Indian Kannada-language romantic comedy film

- Theatrical release poster
- Directed by: Vinayaka N
- Screenplay by: Vinayaka N
- Story by: Vinayaka N
- Produced by: Likith Shetty
- Starring: Likith Shetty; Kushee Ravi; Thejaswini Sharma
- Cinematography: Manohar Joshi
- Edited by: Deepu S. Kumar
- Music by: Gurukiran
- Production company: Ambiencia Productions
- Distributed by: Jayanna Films
- Release date: 21 November 2025
- Running time: 133 minutes
- Country: India
- Language: Kannada

Full Meals is a 2025 Indian Kannada-language romantic comedy film written and directed by N. Vinayaka, making his debut. Produced by Likith Shetty under the banner Ambiencia Productions, the film stars Likith Shetty, Kushee Ravi and Thejaswini Sharma in lead roles, with Rangayana Raghu, Vijay Chendoor and others in supporting roles. The music is composed by Gurukiran and cinematography is handled by Manohar Joshi.

The film's plot revolves around a wedding photographer who finds himself entangled in a chaotic love triangle during a pre-wedding shoot. The film blends humour, emotions, and drama while exploring themes of love, ambition, and relationships.

The film was released theatrically on 21 November 2025 across Karnataka. The film received good reviews where the critics praised its vibrant visuals and performances by Likith Shetty and Kushee Ravi.

== Plot ==
Lucky (Likith Shetty) is an ambitious wedding photographer running a small studio in Bengaluru. Despite his passion for photography, he faces constant financial hurdles—unpaid rent, mounting debts, and pressure from his uncle Pulikeshi (Rangayana Raghu), who supports him but struggles with bank calls for loans taken on Lucky’s behalf. Lucky dreams of making it big in his profession and proving himself to his family.

Pulikeshi secures a major wedding contract: the marriage of Pooja (Kushee Ravi), sister of influential businessman Shankaranna (Rajesh Nataranga), to NRI Kiran (Suraj Lokre). This assignment is Lucky’s golden chance to revive his career. During the pre-wedding shoot, Lucky reconnects with Pooja, revealing a past emotional bond between them. Meanwhile, Preethi (Thejaswini Sharma), a lively makeup artist and Lucky’s close friend, has quietly nurtured feelings for him.

As wedding preparations progress, Pooja begins to show romantic interest in Lucky, creating a chaotic love triangle. Preethi’s affection grows organically through shared work moments, while Pooja’s sudden flirtation adds tension and humor. Lucky finds himself torn between his ambition and two women who care for him, leading to emotional dilemmas and comic situations. The first half is lighthearted, filled with witty dialogues and colorful wedding visuals, while the second half deepens the narrative with Lucky’s backstory—his lost childhood memories, absence of his father, and longing for recognition beyond photography.

The story culminates during Pooja’s wedding. Lucky must choose between love and career, navigating misunderstandings and heartfelt confrontations. Ultimately, the film delivers a bittersweet ending, emphasizing that life, like a full meal, is a mix of sweet and savory moments—ambitions, compromises, and relationships all served together.

== Cast ==
- Likith Shetty as Lucky
- Kushee Ravi as Pooja
- Thejaswini Sharma as Preethi
- Rangayana Raghu as Pulikeshi
- Vijay Chendoor as Mirinda
- Suraj Lokre as Kiran
- Rajesh Nataranga as Shankaranna
- Ravishankar Gowda
- Chandrakala Mohan
- Honnavalli Krishna
- Sujay Shastry
- Kote Prabhakar
- Nagendra Urs
- Ramesh Pandit
- Ganesh Rao

== Production ==
=== Development ===
Director Vinayaka aimed to create a "comfort cinema" experience with relatable characters and real-life emotions. The story was inspired by the vibrant world of weddings and the interpersonal dynamics that unfold during such events. The film was conceptualized as a romantic comedy set against the backdrop of wedding photography. Director N. Vinayaka, known for his work in family dramas, collaborated with writer Harish Gowda for dialogues. Likith Shetty not only played the lead role but also produced the film under Ambiencia Productions. The technical team includes Manohar Joshi (cinematography), Deepu S. Kumar (editing), and Vishwas Kashyap (art direction). Action choreography was done by Arjun Raj and Appu Venkatesh, while dance sequences were choreographed by Madhuri Parashuram.

=== Filming ===
Principal photography took place across Karnataka, including Bengaluru and Mysuru, over a span of 60 days. The film features colorful wedding sets and scenic outdoor locations to capture the festive mood

=== Marketing ===
Promotions began with the release of the official trailer and first single "Wah Eno Havaa" on social media and YouTube. The team engaged in city tours and interviews across Karnataka. A minor controversy arose when a dialogue referring to photographers as "flirts" drew objections from the Karnataka Photographers Association, which was later clarified by the makers.

== Soundtrack ==
Full Meals

Soundtrack album by Gurukiran
- Released: 2025
- Recorded: 2025
- Genre: Feature film soundtrack
- Language: Kannada
- Producer: Gurukiran

The music and background score of the film is composed by Gurukiran. The single "Wah Eno Havaa" was launched as part of the film's promotional campaign ahead of its theatrical release. It was released on YouTube and music streaming platforms, accompanied by a colorful video featuring Likith Shetty and Kushee Ravi in vibrant wedding-themed visuals.

Kannada Track listing
No.	Title	Lyrics	Singer(s)	Length
1.	"Wah Eno Havaa"	Kaviraj	Vijeth Urs, Sunidhi Ganesh	4:05
Total length:				4:05

== Release ==
Full Meals was released theatrically on 21 November 2025 across Karnataka. It was marketed as a family-friendly romantic comedy suitable for all age groups.

== Controversy ==
A few days before the release of Full Meals, a dialogue in the film sparked a dispute with the Karnataka Photographers Association (KPA). The line in question referred to "all photographers" as "flirts," which the association claimed was an unfair generalization of an entire profession. The KPA argued that such language conveyed a negative image of photographers and demanded that the word be removed or muted in the film. They also sent an official letter to the Karnataka Film Chamber of Commerce and threatened to file a formal complaint.

Actor-producer Likith Shetty responded by clarifying that the dialogue was contextual and not intended to insult photographers. He explained that the line occurs when a character discourages her friend from pursuing a photographer she has feelings for, and the intention was purely narrative. Likith emphasized that the film actually portrays photographers’ struggles and daily challenges in a positive light. The team even invited members of the Mangaluru Photographers Association to the premiere, where they reportedly appreciated the film.

Eventually, after protests and backlash, the film's team agreed to remove or mute the word "flirt" and issued an apology to the photographers’ community. This resolution helped diffuse the controversy before the film's theatrical release.
