= The Great Story of Sodabuddi =

- Theatrical release poster
- Directed by: Jothirao Mohit
- Produced by: U. B. Udaya; Vekatraj Bhat
- Starring: Uthpal Gowda; Anusha Ranganath; Kushee Ravi
- Cinematography: Harish Nayak
- Music by: Songs; Mithun M. S. Score: Ruthvik Murlidhar
- Production company: UG Perfect Pictures
- Distributed by: Imagination World
- Release date: 15 April 2016
- Country: India
- Language: Kannada

The Great Story of Sodabuddi (Note: Sodabuddi is used to refer to someone with thick glasses.) is a 2016 Indian Kannada-language romantic drama film directed by Jothirao Mohit and starring newcomers Uthpal Gowda, Anusha Ranganath and Kushee Ravi. The film was released to negative reviews.

== Cast ==
- Uthpal Gowda as Sodabuddi
- Anusha Ranganath as Bhagya
- Kushee Ravi as Anusya
- Rangayana Raghu
- Achyuth Kumar
- Master Hemanth

== Soundtrack ==
The songs were composed by Mithun M. S.

Track listing
No.	Title	Lyrics	Singer(s)	Length
1.	"Kaddil Keredare"	Vijay	Kailash Kher, Kishore	3:40
2.	"Aa Ninna Parichaya"	Vijay	Srijani K S, Tippu	4:28
3.	"Yeno Nannali"	Vijay	Shreya Ghoshal	3:38
4.	"Haalada Vayasali"	Jothirao Mohit	Usha Prakash	3:51
Total length:				15:37

== Reception ==
A critic from The Times of India wrote that "If you're game for a long watch, which gets only a tad interesting after the interval, then go for this film". A critic from the Bangalore Mirror wrote that "Deliberate or otherwise, whatever story there is, it is and confusing. The story in the mind of the director which was then put on paper and what was shot finally seem to be three different things. The end product is a bad buy for the audience". A critic from The New Indian Express wrote that "Without doubt, the movie does achieve to do what most filmmakers dread -- irritate the viewers". A critic from Vijaya Karnataka rated the film two out of five stars and wrote that "The director in an attempt to say everything in one movie, says nothing". A critic from Deccan Herald wrote that "Helmed by an aspiring debutant and played by an ambitious star, The Great Story of Soda Buddi belies facile description. A collage of art house and commercial elements, Soda Buddi turns a bit tedious".
