= Pindam =

- Theatrical release poster
- Directed by: Saikiran Reddy Daida
- Written by: Saikiran Reddy Daida
- Story by: Kavi Siddhartha; Toby Osborne
- Produced by: Kalaahi Media; Yeshwanth Daggumati; Prabu Raja
- Starring: Sriram; Kushee Ravi
- Cinematography: Sathish Manoharan
- Edited by: Sirish Prasad
- Music by: Krishna Saurabh Surampalli
- Production company: Kalaahi Media
- Release date: 15 December 2023
- Running time: 157 minutes
- Country: India
- Language: Telugu

Pindam (transl. Fetus) is a 2023 Indian Telugu horror thriller film directed by Saikiran Reddy Daida. The film stars Sriram and Kushee Ravi in her Telugu debut with Easwari Rao and Srinivas Avasarala in supporting roles.

The film is based on a true incident that happened in a house in Nalgonda in the 1930s. The film was released on 15 December 2023 to mixed reviews.

The film premiered on Aha and Amazon Prime Video on 2 February 2024.

== Cast ==
- Sriram as Anthony
- Kushee Ravi as Mary
- Easwari Rao as Annamma
- Srinivas Avasarala as Loknath
- Ravi Varma as Nayudamma
- Manik Reddy
- Baby Chaitra
- Baby Leisha
- Vijayalakshmi
- Srilatha

== Soundtrack ==
All lyrics are written by Kavi Siddartha; all music is composed by Krishna Saurabh Surampalli.

Track listing
No.	Title	Singer(s)	Length
1.	"Jeeva Pindam"	Anurag Kulkarni	5:06
2.	"Guvva Gelichindi"	K. S. Chithra	2:27
Total length:			7:33

== Reception ==
A critic from Zoom TV wrote that "Pindam emerges as a true-blue horror film that not only adheres to the genre's conventions but also introduces a fresh thematic perspective. The film's success lies in its ability to blend suspense, horror, and emotional turmoil seamlessly. As audiences engage with the spectral mysteries and temporal twists, Pindam stands poised to leave a lasting imprint in the realm of horror cinema". On the contrary, a critic from Eenadu wrote that "Pindam scares here and there".
