= Parole (2010 film) =

Indian action drama film

- Directed by: Shekhar
- Written by: B A Madhu (dialogue)
- Screenplay by: Shekhar
- Story by: Shekhar
- Produced by: Mala S Urs
- Starring: Kishore: Sooraj Lokre; Vishwas; Likith Shetty; Sharath; Supreetha; Pradeep Bogadi
- Cinematography: Gundlupete Suresh
- Edited by: Suresh Urs
- Music by: Balaji K Mithran
- Production company: Gautham Visions
- Release date: 9 April 2010
- Country: India
- Language: Kannada

Parole is a 2010 Indian Kannada-language action drama film directed by Shekhar and starring Kishore, Sooraj Lokre, Vishwas, Likith Shetty, Sharath, Supreetha and Pradeep Bogadi. The film was released alongside Khiladi Krishna and Krishna Nee Late Aagi Baaro to mixed-to-negative reviews.

== Cast ==
- Kishore as CCB cop Uttappa
- Sooraj Lokre as Rahul
- Vishwas as Sharath
- Likith Shetty as Gopi
- Sharath as Jaani
- Supreetha as Nikhitha
- Pradeep Bogadi as Raj
- Rani
- Krutika
- B. Suresha as Shantha Murthy
- Ananya Kasaravalli as journalist
- Suchendra Prasad
- Bank Janardhan
- Vinaya Prasad

== Reception ==
A critic from The Times of India rated the film two-and-a-half out of five stars and wrote that "Director Shekhar has selected a good story for his second movie, but fails to impress with narration, which is often amateurish". A critic from Bangalore Mirror wrote that "Though the film does not bore and is worth a watch, the disappointment is the fact that it is not half as good as the promotional videos". A critic from IANS rated the film two out of five stars and wrote that "Parole could have been a better film, but the slackened pace and ordinary narration mar the film". A critic from Rediff.com rated the film one-and-a-half out of five stars and wrote that "The film warns the youth about the trouble they could get into due to their unmindful ways but the treatment fails to impress".
