= Sankashta Kara Ganapathi =

2018 Kannada romantic comedy film

- Directed by: Arjun Kumar S
- Written by: Arjun Kumar S
- Produced by: Rajesh Babu, Faizan Khan
- Starring: Likith Shetty; Shruthi; Achyuth Kumar
- Cinematography: Uday Leela
- Edited by: Vijeth Chandra, Madhu Kumar
- Music by: Ritvik Murlidhar
- Production company: DYNAMITE FILMS
- Release date: 27 July 2018
- Running time: 117 minutes
- Country: India
- Language: Kannada

Sankashta Kara Ganapathi is a 2018 Indian Kannada-language romantic comedy film directed by Arjun Kumar S. Faizan Khan and Rajesh Babu produced it under Dynamite Films Private Limited's banner. The film features Likith Shetty and Shruti Goradia in the lead roles, with Achyuth Kumar, Manjunath Hegde, Mandeep Rai, Nagabhushana, and Chandu B. Gowda in supporting roles. The film's score and the album were composed by Ritvik Muralidhar, Uday Leela did the cinematography, and Vijeth Chandra and Madhu Kumar did film editing.

The principal photography for the project began on 22 June 2017. The film was released all across Karnataka on 27 July 2018. The Telugu remake rights of the film were sold just a few days after the film was released. As of August 2021, the Hindi remake titled Baayein Haath Ka Khel is in pre-production.

== Plot ==
Ganapati is a young man who lives with his retired father. Despite his father's opposition, he quits his job and becomes a cartoonist at a newspaper publishing house. At this new place of work, he meets Shruti, who was a former classmate on whom he had a crush. Shruti works as a sales and marketing manager at the publishing house.

Ganapati's friend advises him to propose to Shruti. When he approaches her for the same, he has a panic attack and faints as a result. Shruti takes him to the hospital, where he reveals to her that he liked her in college. Shruti reveals that her marriage has already been fixed with Raghu.

An operational mistake during treatment causes Ganapati to develop Alien Hand Syndrome. His left hand moves involuntarily, leading to a series of comedic errors.

He draws a controversial cartoon of a politician, resulting in a fierce backlash from the politician's goons and the termination of his job. Shruti supports him and is sympathetic to his illness.

Ganapathi attends Shruti's wedding but inadvertently disrupts the ceremony when his left hand grabs hers. This causes a scandal and the wedding is called off. Ganapathi and Shruti secretly meet but her father finds out and chases after them. Ganapathi's hand turns the steering wheel resulting in an accident that leaves Shruti badly injured. Shruti's father requests that Ganapathi stay out of her life.

Ganapathi moves on and becomes a successful cartoonist at a comic publishing company. Shruti's father cannot find a suitable groom for his daughter and eventually agrees to her marriage with Ganapathi.

== Cast ==
- Likith Shetty as Ganapathi
- Shruti as Shruti
- Achyuth Kumar as Sudhakar
- Mandeep Rai as Doctor Ashok
- Vijay Kaundinya as Newspaper Editor
- Manjunath Hegde as Shruti's Father
- Rekha Sagar as Shruti's Mother
- Chandu Gowda as Shruti's fiance
- Nagabhushana as Ganapathi's Friend

== Soundtrack ==
Sankashta Kara Ganapathi

Soundtrack album by Rithvik Murlidhar
- Released: 2018
- Recorded: 2018
- Genre: Feature film soundtrack
- Length: 21:04
- Language: Kannada
- Label: PRK Audio

Rithvik Muralidhar composed the score and songs for the film.

All music is composed by Ritvik Muralidhar.

Track list
No.	Title	Lyrics	Singer(s)	Length
1.	"Sankashta Kara Ganapathi"	Nischal S Dambekodi	Raghu Dixit	3:31
2.	"Nooru Choorina"	Nischal S Dambekodi	Sanjith Hegde, Rakshitha Rao	4:24
3.	"Modamodalaagiye"	Nischal S Dambekodi and Madan Bellisalu	Deepak Doddera, Eesha Suchi	4:01
4.	"Jeevanada"	Nithin Jai	Mehboob Saab	4:57
5.	"Nanaghelade"	Nischal S Dambekodi	Gurukiran, Ananya Bhat	4:14

== Reception ==
The Times of India rated the film 3.5 out of 5 and stated: "Go ahead, watch Sankashta Kara Ganapathi, it is definitely that one-time watch and the laughs and novelty factor are the added bonus". The new Indian Express rated the film 3.5 out of 5 and commented: "Debutant director, Arjun Kumar’s Sankashta Kara Ganapathi, a romantic comedy, steers itself with ease into the minuscule league of watchable movies. This, while keeping the entertainment quotient high throughout.". Kannada Prabha rated the film 3 out of 5.
