= Shivarjuna =

2020 Kannada film directed by Shiva Thejas

- Film poster
- Directed by: Shiva Thejas
- Screenplay by: Shiva Thejas
- Story by: Arun Ramdas
- Based on: Giri by Sundar C
- Produced by: M B Manjula Shivarjun
- Starring: Chiranjeevi Sarja; Amrutha Iyengar; Akshatha Srinivas
- Cinematography: H. C. Venugopal
- Edited by: K. M. Prakash
- Music by: Surag Kokila
- Production company: Nischitha Combines
- Distributed by: Nischitha Combines through B K Gangadhar
- Release date: March 12, 2020
- Running time: 137 minutes
- Country: India
- Language: Kannada

Shivarjuna is a 2020 Indian Kannada-language masala film written and directed by Shiva Thejas. The film is produced by M.B. Manjula Shivarjun. It features Chiranjeevi Sarja (in his last role before his unfortunate death) and Amrutha Iyengar along with Akshatha Srinivas in the lead roles. The supporting cast includes Kishore, Tara, Avinash, Kuri Prathap. The score and soundtrack were composed by Surag Kokila, while the cinematography and editing were handled by H C Venu and K. M. Prakash. The film is the remake of the 2004 Tamil film Giri starring Chiranjeevi's uncle Arjun Sarja in the lead role.

Shivarjuna was theatrically released in India on 13 March 2020, where it receiving mixed reviews where the cast performances and action sequences were praised, while the screenwriting was criticized. The film was re-released after the lockdown on 16 October 2020.

== Plot ==
Ramadurga and Rayadurga are two villages, which are always feuding as the headmen Ramegowda and Rayappa have personal enmity. Due to some misunderstanding regarding Rayappa's son's death, Rayappa seeks revenge against Ramegowda and tries to kill Ramegowda's son Nandeesha. However, Nandeesha is saved by his servant's son Shiva, where Nandeesha suddenly disappears.

Twenty years later, Shiva arrives in Krishnarajapuram with a mission to protect a strict officer named Bharavi Sindhuri and his son, Shiva Nandi from Rayappa and his gangsters. During a wedding reception, Shiva saves Bharavi and Nandi from being murdered by Rayappa's son. Later, Shiva reveals that Bharavi's Tehsildar husband was actually Nandeesha whom Rayappa had killed after learning about his real identity. In order to protect the rest of the family, Shiva was sent by Ramegowda to bring them back to the village.

In the present, Shiva brings Bharavi and Nandi back to the village, and finally wipes out Rayappa and his family during the temple festival, thus avenging Nandeesha's death.

== Cast ==
- Chiranjeevi Sarja as Shiva
- Amrutha Iyengar as Paru
- Akshatha Srinivas
- Kishore as Nandeesha, a Tehsildar
- Tara as Baravi Sindhu
- Avinash as Ramegowda
- Kuri Prathap
- Dinesh Mangaluru as MLA
- Sadhu Kokila as a doctor
- Ravi Kishan as Ramappa
- Tharanga Vishwa
- Shivaraj K R Pete
- Nayana

== Box office ==
The film had a total run of more than 5 weeks.

== Music ==
The film's background score and the soundtracks are composed and written by Surag Kokila. The music rights were acquired by Aditya Music.

Tracklist
No.	Title	Lyrics	Singer(s)	Length
1.	"Hakuna Matata"	V. Nagendra Prasad	Tippu (singer)
2.	"Malla Neenu"	Yogaraj Bhat	Aniruddh, Ananya Bhat
3.	"Allondhu Neeli Bhanu"	Kaviraj	Sanjith Hegde, Meghana Raj
4.	"Allondhu Neeli Bhanu"	Kaviraj	Sanjith Hegde, Ananya Bhat
