= Giri (film) =

- Film poster
- Directed by: Sundar C
- Written by: Sundar C; Boopathy Pandian
- Produced by: Khushbu
- Starring: Arjun Sarja; Ramya; Reema Sen
- Cinematography: K. S. Selvaraj
- Edited by: P. Sai Suresh
- Music by: D. Imman
- Production company: Avni Cinemax
- Release date: 1 October 2004
- Running time: 145 minutes
- Country: India
- Language: Tamil

Giri is a 2004 Indian Tamil-language action comedy film directed and co-written by Sundar C, starring Arjun Sarja, Ramya and Reema Sen, with Devayani, Vadivelu, and Prakash Raj among others enacting supporting roles. The film was released on 1 October 2004 and become a profitable venture at the box office and was remade in Kannada in 2020 as Shivarjuna starring Arjun's nephew Chiranjeevi Sarja. This film is also noted to be actress Khushbu's productional debut in her production company house Avni Cinemax.

== Plot ==
Veerapandi Puram and Soolakkarai are two villages, which are on either side of a river and are always feuding as the headmen Veerasamy (Veerapandi Puram) and Sethupathy (Soolakkarai) have personal enmity. Due to some misunderstanding regarding Sethupathy's children's death, Sethupathy seeks revenge against Veerasamy and tries to kill Veerasamy's son Suriyaprakash, but is saved by his servant Paramasivam's son Giri, where Suriyaprakash suddenly disappears. 20 years later, Shiva arrives in Kumbakonam with a mission to protect DSP Chandrashekhar's wife and his son from Sethupathy and his gangsters, where he lives with a bakery owner named Veerabaagu. During a wedding reception, Shiva saves Chandrashekhar's family from being murdered by Sethupathy's son. When questioned about his identity, it is revealed by Ramalingam that Shiva is actually Giri and Chandrashekhar was actually Suriyaprakash (Suriya) whom Sethupathy had killed after learning about his real identity. To protect the rest of the family, Giri was sent to bring them back to the village. In the present, Giri wipes out Sethupathy and his family during a boat race, thus avenging Suriya's death.

== Cast ==
- Arjun as Giri (Shiva)
- Ramya as Devaki
- Reema Sen as Priya
- Vadivelu as Veerabagu
- Prakash Raj as Suriyaprakash Veerasaamy "Suriya" (DSP Chandrashekar)
- Devayani as Suriyaprakash's wife
- Vinu Chakravarthy as Veerasaamy
- FEFSI Vijayan as Sethupathy
- Anandaraj as Pasupathy and Pasupathy's father (dual role)
- Kazan Khan as Pasupathy's brother
- Pandiarajan as Devaki's potential bridegroom
- Mahanadi Shankar as Kanduvatti [Loan shark] Govinda
- Raj Kapoor as Paramasivam (Giri Father)
- Sindhu as Pasupathy's wife
- Ilavarasu as Ramalingam
- Manikka Vinayagam as a Councillor Podhunalam (Maavattam)
- Sai Prashanth as Maavattam's son
- Aarthi as Bun
- Madhan Bob as Veeraabaghu's neighbor
- Gowtham Sundararajan as Police Inspector
- Mayilsamy as Maavattam's PA
- Singamuthu as Financier
- Jasper as Contractor Sathya
- Chitra Lakshmanan as District Collector R. Venugopal IAS
- Aryan as Singampuli
- Bonda Mani

== Production ==
The producer of the film did not pay popular Kannada actress Ramya for the film because the film was not released in Karnataka. The filming was held at Chennai, Kumbakonam, Mayiladuthurai, Pollachi and Trichy. A boat race scene was picturised at Kerala while some songs were shot at a village near Kumbakonam.

== Soundtrack ==
Music and background score were handled by D. Imman.

Track listing
No.	Title	Lyrics	Singer(s)	Length
1.	"Adra Sakkai"	Na. Muthukumar	Karthik, Pop Shalini	4:11
2.	"Kisukisu Manusa"	P. Vijay	Harish Raghavendra, Mathangi	4:41
3.	"Rendu Kaalu Singada Giri"	Na. Muthukumar	Manikka Vinayagam, D. Imman	3:45
4.	"Dei Kaiya Vechikitu Summa Iruda"	P. Vijay	Anuradha Sriram, Devan	4:22
5.	"Oppankara Veethiyiley"	Na. Muthukumar	Karthik, Chinmayi	4:59
6.	"Dubuku Dubuku"	P. Vijay	D. Imman, Anuradha Sriram	4:54
Total length:				25:24

== Reception ==
Malathi Rangarajan of The Hindu wrote, "HIGHLIGHTING ACTION and using comedy and romance now and then for relief, Sundar C. makes quite a quick-paced flick of Avni Cinemax's "Giri " (A). He doesn't allow much room for the viewer to ponder over the fact that the story is the usual family feud with clichéd characters dealt with since time immemorial." G. Ulaganathan of Deccan Herald wrote, "Sundar’s specialty is comedy but one has to use a microscope to find it in the movie. The director, being the producer also, has spent lavishly. Cameraman Selva deserves a pat for capturing the picturesque locales of Kerala".
