= Nanu Matthu Gunda =

Kannada language film

- Directed by: Srinivas Timmayya
- Written by: Vivekananda Tanjarayar
- Produced by: Raghu Hassan
- Starring: Shivaraj K.R. Pete; Samyukta Hornad; Prakash Belawadi
- Music by: Karthik Sharma
- Production company: Poem Pictures production
- Release date: 24 January 2020
- Country: India
- Language: Kannada

Naanu Matthu Gunda is a 2020 Indian Kannada-language comedy film directed by Srinivas Timmayya .It stars Shivaraj K.R. Pete, Samyukta Hornad, Prakash Belawadi. It was released on 24 January 2020.

== Plot ==
Shankar, an auto driver, finds a dog in his rickshaw. Feeling repulsive in the beginning, Shankar begins to warm for the dog and names him as Gunda. The emotional bond between Shankar and Gunda becomes strong that they become the talk of the town, which makes his wife Kavitha to feel jealous. Naanu Mutthu Gunda is a heartwarming story about these three lives coming together.

== Cast ==
- Shivaraj K.R. Pete as Shankar
- Samyukta Hornad as Kavitha
- Prakash Belawadi
- Govinde Gowda

== Release ==
Naanu Matthu Gunda was released on 24 January 2020 and received positive reviews from critics and audience.

== Remakes ==
Navarasan bought the remake rights of the film and plans to remake it in Telugu, Tamil and Malayalam Languages.
