= Kushee Ravi =

Indian actress

- Born: Sushmitha; 23 January 1996 (age 30); Bangalore, Karnataka, India
- Education: SSMRV College
- Occupation: Actress
- Years active: 2016–present
- Spouse: Rakesh Kumar (m. 2021)
- Children: 1

Sushmitha Ravi, known as Kushee Ravi, is an Indian actress who works in Kannada and Telugu-language films. Kushee rose to fame with the Kannada film Dia (2020).

== Early life ==
Sushmitha Ravi was born in Bangalore. She graduated from SSMRV College, Bangalore.

== Career ==
Kushee made her acting debut with the Kannada film The Great Story of Sodabuddi, in 2016. After a four year hiatus, Kushee appeared in the 2020 film Dia. She played the titular role of a college student opposite Pruthvi Ambaar and Dheekshith Shetty. The film emerged a commercial success and was her breakthrough.

She was then seen in the horror film Spooky College which opened to mixed reviews. She was signed to play a role in the movie Nakshe but the film has been delayed. In 2023, she signed her first Telugu movie Pindam, which opened to positive reviews with praise for her performance.

She was next seen in Case of Kondana co-starring Vijay Raghavendra and Bhavana Menon directed by Devi Prasad Shetty. Her next release was Full Meals co-starring Likith Shetty under debutant director Vinayaka.

== Filmography ==
=== Films ===
Year	Title	Role	Language	Notes	Ref.
2016	The Great Story of Sodabuddi	Anusya	Kannada		
2020	Dia	Dia Swaroop	Kannada		
2023	Spooky College	Khushi	Kannada		
2023	Pindam	Mary Anthony	Telugu		
2024	Case of Kondana	Dr. Sahana	Kannada		
2025	Neethi	Neethi	Kannada		
2025	Full Meals	Pooja	Kannada		
2025	Son of Mutthana	Sakshi	Kannada		
2026	Manithan Deivamagalam	Selvi Raghavan	Tamil		
2026	Legacy †	TBA	Telugu	Post-production	
TBA	Daiji †	TBA	Kannada	Completed	
TBA	Naaku Tanti †	TBA	Kannada	Completed	

=== Web series ===
Year	Title	Role	Language	Notes	Ref.
2025	Ayyana Mane	Jaji	Kannada	ZEE5 series	

=== Short films ===
Year	Title	Role	Ref.
2019	Jaatare		
2021	Ikshana	Anu	
2022	Sangama Samagama	Naina	
2022	Everything is Possible	Poorna	

=== Music videos ===
Year	Title	Singer	Language	Ref.
2021	Adipoli	Vineeth Sreenivasan, Sivaangi K.	Tamil	
2022	Neenillade	Sathya Radhakrishna	Kannada	
2025	Buddy	Priya Mali	Tamil	

== Awards and nominations ==
Year	Award	Category	Film	Result	Ref.
2020	South Indian International Movie Awards	Best Actress – Kannada	Dia	Nominated	
2020	South Indian International Movie Awards	Best Actress Critics – Kannada	Dia	Won	
2020	Filmfare Awards South	Best Actress – Kannada	Dia	Nominated	
2021	Chandanavana Film Critics Academy Awards	Best Actress	Dia	Won	
