= Law (film) =

- Official release poster
- Directed by: Raghu Samarth
- Written by: Raghu Samarth
- Produced by: Ashwini Puneeth Rajkumar; M. Govinda
- Starring: Ragini Prajwal
- Cinematography: Sugnaan
- Edited by: Srikanth
- Music by: Vasuki Vaibhav
- Production company: PRK Productions
- Distributed by: Amazon Prime Video
- Release date: 17 July 2020
- Running time: 119 minutes
- Country: India
- Language: Kannada

Law is a 2020 Indian Kannada-language legal drama film written and directed by Raghu Samarth. The film stars Ragini Prajwal in her debut as a law graduate who fights her own case due to her circumstances. It had a direct-to-streaming release on 17 July 2020 on Amazon Prime Video, becoming the second direct-to-streaming Kannada film on any platform after Bhinna (2019).

== Plot ==
Nandini is a law graduate who files a case of gang-rape and uses the power of social media to gain support. After several delays by an ineffective local police, the case is handed over to the CBI. Parthasarathy Brahma, the officer in-charge, sets about his investigation and finds out that the culprits are Kamalesh Lad, Bhandari and Kanthi Kotwal, all sons of powerful and corrupt politicians. The trial begins with Nandini representing herself, against the formidable prosecutor and all the evidence is in favour of Nandini. After a series of turns and twists, Brahma begins to doubt that the crime even happened.

== Cast ==
- Ragini Prajwal as Nandini
- Mukhyamantri Chandru as the judge
- Siri Prahlad as Dashmi
- Achyuth Kumar as Jagadish Prakash
- Sudha Rani
- Avinash as Nandini's father
- Krishna Hebbale as Parthasarathy Brahma
- Rajesh Nataranga as Shyam Prasad
- Mandya Ramesh as the police inspector

== Production ==
In March 2019, it was announced that Ragini Prajwal would be making her feature film debut in Law, directed by Raghu Samarth and produced by Puneeth Rajkumar's PRK Productions. Regarding the title, Raghu said the protagonist "is a law graduate, and due to her circumstances, she ends up fighting her own case. This is why we thought the title worked." Ragini said she accepted the film because of its script, adding, "I didn't see myself doing a romantic film as my debut, so I thought this movie is a great first choice." The film was produced by Puneeth's wife Ashwini and M. Govinda. Besides directing, Raghu also wrote the script and interacted with a retired crime branch officer D. K. Shivaram and advocate Nagendra as part of his research. Cinematography was handled by Sugnaan, and editing by Srikanth.

== Music ==
The music is composed by Vasuki Vaibhav. The film's only song is "Happy Song", a "new-age party song" written by Jayanth Kaikini and sung by Vasuki Vaibhav and Madhuri Seshadri.

== Release ==
Law had a direct-to-streaming premiere on 17 July 2020 on Amazon Prime Video. It was originally planned for a theatrical release, but due to the COVID-19 pandemic, the theatrical release was cancelled. The film was initially supposed to premiere on Prime Video on 26 June 2020 before being postponed by three weeks. This made it the first Kannada film to be released directly on that platform without a theatrical release, and second direct-to-streaming release in Kannada after Bhinna (2019).

== Reception ==
Haricharan Pudipeddi, writing for the portal Cinestaan, rated the film one star and termed it "unimaginably bad". Sowmya Rajendran of The News Minute felt the "courtroom drama is let down by bad writing". Karthik Kumar of Hindustan Times called the film a "gloriously bad legal drama and makes a mockery of the genre". Jananki K. of India Today wrote, "Raghu Samarth's Law did an exceptional job of telling the story of a rape survivor. There are certain glaring lapses in the story which fails to create the impact the film would have intended to." Baradwaj Rangan of Film Companion wrote "The film, alas, is terribly written and executed. Even if you ignore the mood-killing song and the cringy comedy... it’s very hard to stay invested in these drab, borderline-nonsensical proceedings. The knowing reaction shots (meant to mislead us) get unbearable after a point...Law is further proof that good intentions can never triumph over bad filmmaking".
