= Likith Shetty =

Indian actor

- Born: Arsikere, Karnataka, India
- Occupations: Actor producer
- Years active: 2007–present

Likith Shetty is an Indian actor, who works in the Kannada and Tulu film industries. He started his career as a television anchor in 2007.

== Career ==
Likith Shetty started his career by anchoring television shows in 2007. Always desiring to be an actor, he started his journey into acting and completed a diploma in theatre from Navarasa school of Art, Bangalore. He made his film acting debut in Parole in 2010 directed by Rajshekar.

His next film was Oriyardori Asal (2011) in Tulu where he played the hero; it was a hit and ran for 300 days.

Along with this he also started being an anchor for many TV shows. He has also worked in Nam Duniya Nam Style, Madime and Sankashta Kara Ganapathi. In 2022, he featured in Family Pack, playing the role of Abhi. His recent projects include Abbabba, a film directed by K. M. Chaitanya. He played the lead role of Dileep alongside Amrutha Iyengar in the movie.

Likith's next film was Full Meals, which he also produced. The film stars Kushee Ravi and Thejaswini Sharma, alongside Likith in the lead roles.

== Films ==
| Year | Film | Role | Language | Notes | Ref. |
|---|---|---|---|---|---|
| 2010 | Parole | Gopi | Kannada | | |
| 2011 | Oriyardori Asal | Munna | Tulu | | |
| 2011 | Panchamrutha | Raghu | Kannada | segment: "Droha: a betrayal" | |
| 2013 | Nam Duniya Nam Style | Preetham | Kannada | | |
| 2014 | Madime | | Tulu | | |
| 2018 | Sankashta Kara Ganapathi | Ganapathi | Kannada | | |
| 2022 | Family Pack | Abhi | Kannada | | |
| 2024 | Abbabba | Dileep | Kannada | | |
| 2025 | Full Meals | Lucky | Kannada | | |

== Television ==
| Year | Title | Role | Language | Channel |
|---|---|---|---|---|
| 2007–2010 | U2 Bakra | Anchor | Kannada | U2 |
| 2010–2011 | Ogaraney Dabbi | Anchor | Kannada | Zee Kannada |
