= Samyukta Hornad =

Indian actress

- Born: Karnataka, India
- Other names: Samyukta Belawadi; Samyukta Hornad
- Occupation: Actress
- Years active: 2007–present
- Parent: Sudha Belawadi (mother)
- Relatives: Bhargavi Narayan (grandmother); Prakash Belawadi (uncle)

Samyukta Hornad is an Indian actress who appears in Kannada films. Her debut movie was Lifeu Ishtene directed by Pawan Kumar. She is known for her roles in the commercially successful films Barfi (2011), and Oggarane (2014).

== Early life and career ==
Samyukta Hornad is a professional model and actress based in Karnataka, India. She did her undergraduate studies in Media, English and Psychology at Christ University. She started her career as a TV show anchor before pursuing her career as a lead Actress. She has primarily appeared in Indian films and is considered a lead Actress in the film industry.

Samyukta Hornad's first movie was Aa Dinagalu in Kannada. Her second movie was Lifeu Ishtene opposite Diganth.

== Filmography ==
- All Films are in Kannada, unless otherwise noted

| Year | Film | Role | Notes |
|---|---|---|---|
| 2007 | Aa Dinagalu | Divya Naayak | |
| 2011 | Lifeu Ishtene | Rashmi | |
| 2011 | Barfi | Samyuktha Belawadi | |
| 2014 | Oggarane | Meghana | Won, Filmfare Award for Best Supporting Actress – Kannada |
| 2014 | Un Samayal Arayil | Meghana | Tamil film |
| 2014 | Ulavacharu Biryani | Meghana | Telugu film |
| 2015 | Neene Bari Neene | | |
| 2016 | Jigarthanda | Lakshmi | |
| 2016 | Sa... | | |
| 2017 | Sarkari Kelasa Devara Kelasa | | |
| 2017 | Kaafi Thota | Tanvi | |
| 2017 | Maarikondavaru | | |
| 2017 | Dayavittu Gamanisi | Sanjana | Nominated, Filmfare Award for Best Supporting Actress – Kannada; Nominated - SIIMA Award for Best Actor in a Supporting Role (Female) - Kannada |
| 2018 | Abhiyum Anuvum | Dhivya (Dhivi) | Tamil film |
| 2018 | The Villain | Herself | Special Appearance in Bolo Bolo Ramappa Song |
| 2018 | MMCH | Mala | |
| 2019 | Traya | Priya | |
| 2020 | Nanu Matthu Gunda | Kavitha | |
| 2020 | Krishna and His Leela | Arya | Telugu film; Netflix film |
| 2020 | Arishadvarga | Saakshi | |
| 2022 | One Cut Two Cut | Nagaveni | Amazon Prime film |
| 2023 | Hondisi Bareyiri | Kavana | |
| 2023 | Kranti | Jenny | |
| 2023 | Love Birds | Maya | |
| 2023 | Mandala: The UFO Incident | DCP Radhika | |
| 2023 | Toby | Savithri | |
| 2024 | Max | Inspector B. Aarathi | |
| TBA | Red Rum | TBA | Tamil film; delayed |

== Web series ==
| Year | Film | Role | Language | Platform | Notes |
|---|---|---|---|---|---|
| 2019 | Gods of Dharmapuri /(G.O.D) | Divya Mathews | Telugu | ZEE5 | |
| 2020 | Locked | Vaishnavi | Telugu | Aha | |
| 2022-2023 | Jhansi | SI Sakshi | Telugu | Disney+ Hotstar | |
