= Barfi (film) =

2013 film directed by Shekar

- Theatrical release poster
- Directed by: Shekar
- Screenplay by: Shekar
- Story by: Shekar
- Produced by: K. M. Shankar
- Starring: Diganth; Bhama
- Cinematography: Gundlupet Suresh
- Edited by: K. M. Prakash
- Music by: Arjun Janya
- Production company: Chaturthi Creations
- Release date: 30 August 2013
- Running time: 145 minutes
- Country: India
- Language: Kannada

Barfi is a 2013 Indian Kannada romantic comedy film written and directed by Shekar. It stars Diganth and Bhama in the lead roles. Arjun Janya is the music director and KM Shankar is the producer of the film.

== Plot ==
Santosh (Diganth) is an educated software professional who comes from a well-to-do family. He is the only child to his parents. He has two close friends, who are also his office colleagues. Santosh has a pet dog which he loves dearly. Santosh' mother (Sudha Balewadi) loves her son and is very eager to get him married. She keeps pestering Santosh with marriage proposals, which makes Santosh feel uncomfortable. After, many unsuccessful attempts to find a suitable match, Santosh and his friends come across an online matrimony site. Santosh' friends though married, try their luck on the site, but end up having an unpleasant experience. They ask Santosh to upload his profile to find a suitable match. Santosh uploads his profile and makes a search, which leads him to Kushi (Bhama) a Punjabi girl with ancestry in Karnataka.

Santosh is initially taken aback by her ability to speak Kannada so well. After, few exchanges on phone and chat, they eventually fall in love. Santosh's friends encourage him to take this matter ahead and advise him to visit Chandigarh, the place where Kushi stays. Santosh leaves for Chandigarh much to the anguish of his mother. On reaching the city, he meets Kushi and Kushi's family accepts him after slight difficulty. Santosh and Kushi enjoy each other's company but, Santosh is uncomfortable because of the behaviour of some of Kushi's family members. Both, Santosh and Kushi dream of getting married.

But, destiny has something else in store. Santosh is killed in a shooting from the enemy side that leaves his family and friends shell shocked and aghast. Kushi's father does not let Kushi know about it as he understands that she will not be able to go through it.

== Cast ==
- Diganth as Santosh
- Bhama as Kushi
- Harish Raj as Balu
- Dilip Raj
- Samyukta Hornad
- Indrajit Lankesh
- Sudha Belawadi
- Jai Jagadish
- Suchendra Prasad
- Pavithra Lokesh

== Production ==
The principal photography of the film officially began on 5 September 2012, with the actress-politician Tara giving away the first shot at a temple near Basavanagudi, Bangalore. The film had earlier hit the headlines for the news that it is a remake of Hindi movie with the same title starring Ranbir Kapoor, Priyanka Chopra and Ileana D'Cruz in lead roles. However, it was denied as a baseless rumour as Rajsekhar mentioned that the film has a fresh love story and a team of six expert writers were involved in the writing process that nearly took a year to complete.

== Soundtrack ==
Barfi

Soundtrack album by Arjun Janya
- Released: 28 April 2013
- Genre: Feature film soundtrack
- Length: 33:57
- Label: Anand Audio

Arjun Janya scored the film's background music and composed for its soundtrack, with its lyrics written by Ghouse Peer, Jayant Kaikini, Kaviraj, Hrudaya Shiva, Raghavendra Kamath and S. Bahubali. The soundtrack album consists of seven tracks.

No.	Title	Lyrics	Singer(s)	Length
1.	"Eno Onthara"	Ghouse Peer	Arjun Janya	4:52
2.	"Oh Mahiyaave"	Jayant Kaikini	Sonu Nigam, Shreya Ghoshal	4:50
3.	"Kannali Kannidu"	Kaviraj	Sonu Nigam, Shreya Ghoshal	4:49
4.	"Yaare Yaare"	Ghouse Peer	Sonu Nigam	4:16
5.	"Onde Samane"	Raghavendra Kamath	Vijay Prakash	5:00
6.	"Baaro Baaro"	Hrudaya Shiva	Anuradha Bhat	5:30
7.	"Kaage Kannu"	S. Bahubali	Kailash Kher	4:40
Total length:				33:57
