= Amrutha Iyengar =

Indian actress (born 1996)

- Born: 26 July 1996 (age 30); Mysore, Karnataka, India
- Education: B.A. Psychology
- Occupation: Actress
- Years active: 2017- present

Amrutha Iyengar (born 26 July 1996) is an Indian actress who predominantly works in Kannada films. Iyengar is a recipient of a Filmfare Award South and two South Indian International Movie Awards.

She made her acting debut in 2017, with Simha Hakida Hejje. She had her career breakthrough in 2020 with Love Mocktail and Popcorn Monkey Tiger, with the former earning her the SIIMA Award for Best Supporting Actress – Kannada. Amrutha's performance in Badava Rascal (2021), won her the Filmfare Critics Award for Best Actress – Kannada.

== Career ==
Amrutha made her acting debut at the age of 19 through the 2017 movie Simha Hakida Hejje directed by Vikram Kumar. She was next see in the 2019 movie Anushka which received mixed response.

The year 2020 proved to be her breakthrough year with Love Mocktail, where she played Joshitha opposite to Actor Krishna. The film was a commercial success and Aravind Shwetha of The News Minute noted, "Amruta shows promise and potential." Her next release with Dhananjaya, Popcorn Monkey Tiger was a box office success too. That year, she also appeared in Shivarjuna. In 2021, Amrutha played Sangeetha in Badava Rascal, reuniting with Dhananjay. It too became a commercial success. A Sharadhaa of The New Indian Express stated, "Amrutha justifies her role in limited screen time."

Amrutha had four film releases in 2022. She first appeared in Love Mocktail 2, where she reprised her role from the prequel Love Mocktail, Family Pack with Likith Shetty was her next release, directly releasing on Amazon Prime. She next appeared in Window seat, co-starring Nirup Bhandari and Sanjana Anand. O alongside Milana Nagaraj was her last release that year. Y. Maheswara Reddy of Bangalore Mirror stated that she have done her best in the "deglamorised role".

In 2023, Amrutha reunited with Dhananjaya again for Gurudev Hoysala, which became a box office success. Gurudev Hoysala marked the third successful collaboration between Amrutha and Dhananjaya. In 2024, Amrutha first appeared opposite Likith Shetty in Abbabba, which was a moderate success. Sridevi S of The Times of India noted, "Amrutha proves that she has a lot to offer. Her anger is as infectious as her smile." She then appeared alongside Dhananjaya for the fourth time in Zebra, which marked her Telugu film debut.

== Media image ==
In the Bangalore Times' 30 Most Desirable Women list, Amrutha was placed 17th in 2020.

== Filmography ==
=== Films ===
All films are in Kannada, unless otherwise noted.

Key
†	Denotes films that have not yet been released

Year	Title	Role	Notes	Ref.
2017	Simha Hakida Hejje	Sonu		
2019	Anushka	Anushka Devi and Amrita		
2020	Love Mocktail	Joshitha "Jo"		
2020	Popcorn Monkey Tiger	Sumithra		
2020	Shivarjuna	Paru		
2021	Badava Rascal	Sangeetha		
2022	Love Mocktail 2	Joshitha "Jo"	Cameo appearance	
2022	Family Pack	Bhoomika "Baby Boo"		
2022	Window Seat	Anjali		
2022	O	Nisha		
2023	Gurudev Hoysala	Ganga		
2024	Abbabba	Akhila		
2024	Zebra	Aaradya	Telugu film; special appearance	
2026	Love Mocktail 3	Joshitha "Jo"		
TBA	Halka Don†	TBA	Kannada-Telugu bilingual film; Filming	
TBA	Father†	TBA	Filming	
TBA	Untitled next†	TBA	Filming	

== Awards and nominations ==
Year	Film	Awards	Category	Result	Ref.
2021	Love Mocktail	South Indian International Movie Awards	Best Supporting Actress – Kannada	Won	
2021	Love Mocktail	Chandanavana Film Critics Academy Awards	Best Supporting Actress	Nominated	
2022	Love Mocktail	Filmfare Awards South	Best Supporting Actress – Kannada	Nominated	
2022	Badava Rascal	Filmfare Awards South	Best Actress – Kannada	Nominated	
2022	Badava Rascal	Filmfare Awards South	Best Actress Critics – Kannada	Won	
2022	Badava Rascal	South Indian International Movie Awards	Best Actress – Kannada	Nominated	
2022	Badava Rascal	South Indian International Movie Awards	Best Actress Critics – Kannada	Won	
