= Uriyadi (soundtrack) =

Uriyadi (Original Motion Picture Soundtrack)

Soundtrack album by Masala Coffee, Anthony Daasan and Vishal Chandrashekhar
- Released: 28 January 2016
- Recorded: 2014–2015
- Genre: Feature film soundtrack
- Length: 31:16
- Language: Tamil
- Label: Sony Music
- Producers: Masala Coffee; Vijay Kumar

Masala Coffee chronology
Uriyadi (Original Motion Picture Soundtrack) (2016)	Hello Namasthe (2016)

Anthony Daasan chronology
Aviyal (2016)	Uriyadi (2017)	MGR Magan (2021)

Vishal Chandrashekhar chronology
Krishna Gaadi Veera Prema Gaadha (2016)	Uriyadi (2017)	Kuttram 23 (2017)

Uriyadi (Original Motion Picture Soundtrack) is the soundtrack album to the 2016 film of the same name directed and produced by debutant Vijay Kumar, who also starred as one of the leads. The film's soundtrack featured seven songs composed by the band Masala Coffee, Anthony Daasan and Vishal Chandrashekhar. The soundtrack was released through Sony Music India on 28 January 2016.

== Development ==
The band Masala Coffee made their debut in film music scene composing three songs for the film. According to the band's frontman and percussionist-cum-vocalist Varun Sunil, "it is perhaps for the first time that a music band is scoring music for a Tamil film." Kumar contacted the band after listening to few of their compositions and confirmed their involvement in the project. Sunil, however claimed that adapting to the film music was a challenge, owing to the industry demands on specific genre of film music. After interacting with the makers, they had finalized the tracks and even though they had compromised on certain occasions, it did not dilute the flavor of the band. However, Sunil admitted the music being more important than the commercial elements due to its significance in the story.

The film has three original tracks—a heavy metal version of the poem "Agnikunjondru" written by Mahakavi Subramaniya Bharathiyar, performed by Sooraj Santhosh, the band's lead vocalist. He also performed another song with Sunil, titled "Kaantha" which was based on the Malayalam song of the same title, with the lyrics being changed for the Tamil version. The third song "Maane Maane" was initially tuned by the band with additional production by Anthony Daasan, who wrote lyrics and performed vocals for the track with the band. The unplugged version of the track was performed by Siddharth and additionally produced by Vishal Chandrashekhar, which was used for promotional purposes.

Besides acting and directing, Vijay Kumar also composed the film's background score. The music director Kumar initially hired quit the project due to health issues, and he later reworked on the score for the first reel. He used the band's raw compositions, instead of the songs that were finalized for the film. Despite his minimal knowledge about music, he had learnt sound engineering for this film and with the help of Abhinav Sunder Nayak, the film editor, Kumardjointly ited the visuals to the film score, as is done for songs. KuHe rated each scene and the tone to the musicians and came up with the piece, and constructed the film score this way. The entire process took them eight months for the score.

== Release ==
The album was released by Sony Music India on 28 January 2016 through music streaming platforms for digital download and through music CDs.

== Reception ==
The soundtrack was positively received by music critics. Behindwoods wrote "Uriyadi is a lively album with experimental fusion and enjoyable tracks. Though the number of tracks is less, the quality is all which matters!" Film critic Ramesh of Assorted Collections said, "Masala Coffee's mainstream debut is short and highly listenable for the Kaantha and Agni Kunjondru, but the band stays true to their sound in their debut mainstream album also." Vipin Nair of Music Aloud stated the album as a "promising Tamil debut for the band", while Karthik Srinivasan of Milliblog called the album as "captivating". Siddharth K. of Sify called the album as "an enjoyable one for music lovers".

== Track listing ==
Uriyadi (Original Motion Picture Soundtrack) track listing
No.	Title	Lyrics	Music	Singer(s)	Length
1.	"Agnikunjondru"	Mahakavi Subramaniya Bharatiyar	Masala Coffee	Sooraj Santhosh	3:19
2.	"Maane Maane"	Anthony Daasan	Anthony Daasan	Anthony Daasan, Masala Coffee	5:34
3.	"Kaantha"	GKB	Masala Coffee	Sooraj Santhosh, Varun Sunil	4:54
4.	"Maane Maane" (Unplugged)	Anthony Daasan	Vishal Chandrashekhar, Anthony Daasan	Siddharth	4:11
5.	"Agnikunjondru" (Karaoke)	—	Masala Coffee	Instrumental	3:18
6.	"Maane Maane" (Karaoke)	—	Anthony Daasan	Instrumental	5:08
7.	"Kaantha" (Karaoke)	—	Masala Coffee	Instrumental	4:53
Total length:					31:16
