= Uriyadi 2 =

2019 Tamil film by Vijay Kumar

- Release poster
- Directed by: Vijay Kumar
- Written by: Vijay Kumar
- Produced by: Suriya
- Starring: Vijay Kumar; Vismaya
- Cinematography: Praveen Kumar N.
- Edited by: Linu M.
- Music by: Govind Vasantha
- Production company: 2D Entertainment
- Distributed by: Sakthi Film Factory
- Release date: 5 April 2019
- Running time: 116 minutes
- Country: India
- Language: Tamil

Uriyadi 2 is a 2019 Indian Tamil-language political action thriller film written and directed by Vijay Kumar and produced by actor Suriya’s 2D Entertainment. It stars Vijay Kumar and newcomer Vismaya, while Abbas, "Parithabangal" Sudhakar, Durai Ramesh, and Shankar Thas play supporting roles. The music was composed by Govind Vasantha, and the film was released on 5 April 2019.

A spiritual sequel to the 2016 film Uriyadi, it was released on 5 April 2019 to positive critical reviews for its dialogues and political content. It turned out to be a commercial success.

== Plot ==
Raj Prakash, a wealthy NRI businessman, wants to open an insecticide factory in London, but was denied the required permissions due to the toxicity of the key compound MIC used. Using the influence of local politicians, Raj Prakash set up the insecticide factory in Tamil Nadu and did good business through exports until the insecticide was eventually banned by the UN, eventually declining his export business.

With dwindling returns, Raj Prakash proposed to open a copper sterlite factory after learning of its concentration in the area, but was faced with backlash from the local people, forcing him to withdraw his ambitions. With the insecticide factory being his only business, Raj Prakash decided to double the returns from the existing factory, which was already in a derelict state. Lenin Vijay, Saravanan and Pazhanisamy are three best friends in the town of Sengathirumalai who eventually secure a job in the insecticide factory with the help of a recommendation.

Vijay also falls in love with Isai Vani, a medical doctor working in the same factory. On their first day, their neighbour Seenu, who is working in one of the units of the factory, is admitted to the hospital due to sustained burns, but is pronounced dead at the hospital and his death is ruled out as accidental poisoning. Later on, the factory is deemed unfit during a periodical audit due to improper maintenance of the MIC storage tanks, resulting in a significantly higher storage temperature than the normal storage temperature.

During the audit, Raj Prakash intervenes and bribes the auditor into ignoring the observed issues while promising him a share of the profits. Raj Prakash gets acquainted with Sengai Kumar, a lower-caste politician who tries to manipulate the elections by bribing voters. Due to improper maintenance of pipes and the storage tank, Saravanan gets splashed by MIC in the face along with three others. They are taken to the hospital, but they eventually succumb to their injuries. Vijay and Pazhanisamy are distraught and heartbroken at Saravanan's death.

Sengai uses this situation to spark a protest to close down the factory, but it has been secretly funded by Raj Prakash to instill sympathy in the minds of the locals. Vijay learns from Isai Vani that the deaths of Seenu and Saravanan were caused by MIC ingestion. While Saravanan had directly come into contact with the chemical, Seenu's prosthetic leg was made of polyurethane made in the same factory, which upon ignition produced MIC and caused his death. The factory is temporarily shut down, but is reopened through Sengai's influence with no upgrades done to the withering factory.

Vijay and Pazhanisamy try to take up the issue with the local authorities, including Sengai, but are met with disdain. Things get worse when the storage tanks are about to implode. Vijay tries to contact the factory manager about the countermeasures and antidote for MIC poisoning, but the manager abruptly ends the call and turns off the phone. Vijay immediately contacts Isai Vani and tells her of the plight at the factory, where she arranges for medications at the local hospital, while the locals send some of their relatives away from the town for safety.

The storage tanks eventually burst and release a plume of MIC gas into the air, which kills the remaining population, including Vijay's parents. Vijay, Isai Vani and Pazhanisamy are shocked at the outcome, and Vijay becomes hysterical when he learns about his parents' demise. Vijay is later arrested after he is falsely accused of adding water to the MIC tank by Raj Prakash, which caused the gas leak. Vijay is bailed out after three months, and he and Pazhanisamy take up the issue into their own hands.

While Vijay and Pazhanisamy educate the people through the media about the atrocities of the politicians joining hands with the industrialists for their own political gains, they also talk about the dangers of the chemicals used in the factory. Using the facade of protests, Vijay and his accomplices eventually confront the factory manager, Raj Prakash and Sengai. Vijay and his accomplices kill them for their immorality, thus providing justice to the locals.

== Cast ==
- Vijay Kumar as Lenin Vijay
- Vismaya as Isai Vani
- Abbas as Saravanan
- "Parithabangal" Sudhakar as Palanisamy
- Durai Ramesh as Raj Prakash
- Shankar Thas as Sengai Kumar
- Anantha Raj as Thamizh Kumaran
- Aaru Bala as Sengai Kumar's right-hand man
- Maris Raja as Sengai Kumar's supporter
- R. P. Sasi Kumar
- Karthikeyan
- Dinesh Chelliah
- Arazan
- Soundariya Nanjundan as interviewer (uncredited)

== Production ==
Uriyadi 2 was directed by Vijay Kumar with Suriya producing the film under his production house, 2D Studios. Principal photography commenced on 20 September 2018 in Tenkasi. The first look motion poster was released by Suriya on the same day. Vijay Kumar is also the co-producer, through his production house, Souvenir Productions. Most of the shooting took place in Tenkasi and Courtallam. New technicians were introduced in this film, where Praveen Kumar and Linu are assigned as the cinematographer and editor respectively. Vicky is the stunt director, continuing his association from Kumar's previous film. Meanwhile, Govind Vasantha who earlier composed for Asuravadham, 96 and Solo is selected as the music director, working with the director for the first time.

The film's principal photography was completed in 36 days. The audio release took place on 23 March 2019. The film's teaser was released by Suriya on the same day and garnered high expectations.

== Release ==
The film released on 5 April 2019. Initially a limited release, its success and word-of-mouth popularity led to being awarded more screens and shows. It went on to do well at the Tamil Nadu box office.

== Political significance ==
Many critics highlighted the political content of the film that mirrored the current and past state of affairs. Cartoonist Bala wrote the film "registers firmly how ruling parties, opposition parties and caste-based political parties are hitmen of corporate" and urged the next generation to watch it as it is an important lesson for them. Nakkheeran elaborated on how the film captures the essence of the cause and aftermath of the Bhopal disaster, the protests against Sterlite factory and the Thoothukudi massacre that followed it. News18 Tamil Nadu called it a “daring film against corrupt politicians that sent shock waves into the political landscape of Tamil Nadu.”

== Soundtrack ==
Uriyadi 2

Soundtrack album by Govind Vasantha
- Released: 23 March 2019
- Genre: Feature film soundtrack
- Length: 19:47
- Language: Tamil
- Label: Sony Music
- Producer: Govind Vasantha

Govind Vasantha chronology
Seethakaathi (2018)	Uriyadi 2 (2019)	Thambi (2019)

The film's original soundtrack was composed by Govind Vasantha, of Thaikkudam Bridge and 96 fame. The audio rights are secured by Sony Music.

The first single from the album, titled 'Vaa Vaa Penne', was released on 4 March 2019. The song received a positive review from the Times of India. The album was released on 23 March 2019.

Tracklist
No.	Title	Lyrics	Singer(s)	Length
1.	"Vaa Vaa Penne"	Vijay Kumar, Nagaraji	Sid Sriram, Priyanka	4:55
2.	"Iraiva"	Vijay Kumar, Nagaraji	Govind Vasantha	5:58
3.	"Urimai"	Vijay Kumar, Nagaraji	Govind Vasantha	3:49
4.	"Vaa Vaa Penne (Reprise Version)"	Vijay Kumar, Nagaraji	Vipin Lal, Priyanka	4:55
Total length:				19:47

== Critical reception ==
Uriyadi 2 released on 5 April 2019 to positive critical reviews. The Times of India gave the film 3.5 out of 5 stars, stating that the socio-political aspects are nicely detailed and the dialogues are hard-hitting. A reviewer for Sify called it a compelling watch for "its gutsy writing and inherent honesty" and gave it 3.5 stars. Filmibeat rated the film 4 out of 5 stars, calling it an honest and intense political film.

Baradwaj Rangan, a film critic, noted the film was a mix of political ideology and heroism, with flashes of brilliance and gave it 2.5 stars. Sreedhar Pillai, another critic, gave it 3.25 stars and wrote "The film works to a large extent because it moves at a rapid pace and good writing, which keep the viewer hooked". Maalai Malar wrote the audience response for the dialogues was tremendous and that Vijay Kumar registers well as both the director and actor. News7 Tamil called Vijay Kumar a rising star and commended the believability and acting prowess of all the actors.

A reviewer for NDTV commended the film's revolutionary dialogues and gave it 4 stars. Hindustan Times rated it 3/5, saying "Uriyadi 2 as a disaster movie works quite well and no other Tamil film in recent years has touched upon this angle as realistically as this film. Behindwoods gave the film 3 stars and called it "an intense political film". The website Tamilglitz rated it 3.5 stars and called it hard-hitting and disturbing.
