= Varun Sunil =

Indian percussionist and singer

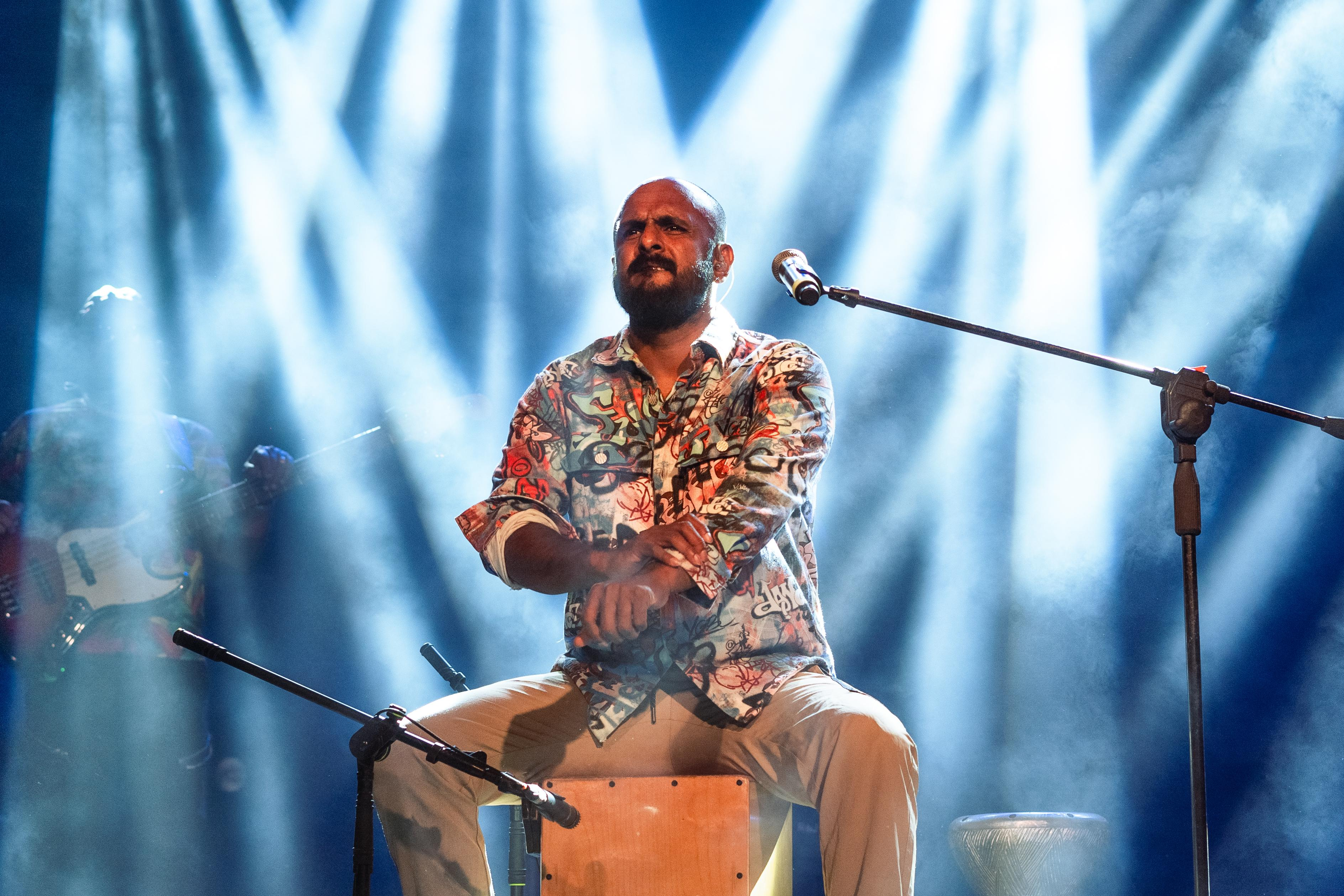
- Varun Sunil performing in live in Coimbatore with Masala Coffee

Background information
- Born: Varun Sunil; 10 May 1987 (age 39); Kochi, Kerala, India
- Occupations: Percussionist; singer; record producer
- Instruments: Percussion, singing
- Label: Sony Music India
- Member of: Masala Coffee

Varun Sunil (born 10 May 1987) is an Indian percussionist, singer, music producer and founder of Masala Coffee, one of the popular contemporary folk bands in South India. He is also well known for his musical contributions in Telugu, Tamil, Bollywood and Malayalam movie industries. He has performed alongside Vishwa Mohan Bhatt, Hariharan, T. H. Vinayakram, Ranjit Barot, Fazal Qureshi and many more.

== Early life ==
Varun Sunil was born in Kochi, Kerala. He started playing mridangam (percussion) at a young age. He did a course in Audio Recording Arts and Music Production from Chetana Studio in Thrissur and later moved to Chennai. Initially he started making jingles for advertisements for Indian brands as a freelancer.

== Career ==
Sunil began his career by producing jingles for advertisements for Indian FMCG brands before venturing into films.

In 2014 Varun Sunil and his few friends collaborated for Kappa TV’s Music Mojo Session, doing a cover of A R Rahman’s Munbe Vaa and Snehithane which became viral, gaining millions of views on YouTube. Following the success, Varun formed the band Masala Coffee.

In 2019 he was officially signed to Sony Music South with his Tamil song release "Paakura Ponnu" along with Ku Karthik. Later that year, he made his debut as a film composer for the Telugu film Rajdooth, contributing the song "Emo Emo".

In early 2020 he made his debut for the film "Trance" for the song "Noolupoya" which he sung. In 2021, Sunil collaborated with Swetha Mohan for his Tamil track "Kan Munnale", which he produced and composed. The song was released under the Sony Music South label.

In 2022 Sunil composed the tracks from the Tamil film Ward 126, composing the film's music. The same year, He worked with K.S. Chithra on the song "Chaanchaadunni Chaanchaadu" from the film "Haya".

In 2023 Sunil composed the music for the Malayalam film Valatty, directed by Devan Jayakumar and produced by Vijay Babu of Friday Film House. The film was released on 21 July 2023 and has released in over 5 languages with different artists.

== Discography ==
=== Albums ===
Release Title	Year	Record label	Ref
Original Background Score for "Valatty"	2023	Friday Music Company	
Original Motion Picture Soundtracks for "Valatty"	2023	Friday Music Company	
Original Motion Picture Soundtracks for "Rajdooth"	2019	Saregama	
Original Motion Picture Soundtracks for "Kannum Kannum Kollaiyadithaal" – Under Masala Coffee	2022	Zee Music Company	

=== Singles ===
Release Title	Featuring	Year	Record label	Ref
Fun Maaro (From "Sila Nodigalil")	Masala Coffee, Ku Karthik	2023	Saregama	
Shwanare (From "Valatty")	Vinayak Sasikumar, Jyotikrishna	2023	Friday Music Company	
Friendship Song (From "Valatty")	Maria Mathew Kolady, Manu Manjith	2023	Friday Music Company	
The Chase (From "Valatty")		2023	Friday Music Company	
Chaanchaadunni Chaanchaadu (from "Haya")	K. S. Chithra	2022	Saina Audios	
Ho.. Ek Do Pal (from "Haya")	Gwen Fernandes	2022	Saina Audios	
Koode (from "Haya")	Aslam Abdul Majeed	2022	Saina Audios	
Kallupaatu (from "Haya")	Resmi Sateesh, Binu Sariga	2022	Saina Audios	
Hey Veyile (from "Haya")	Vishnu Sunil, Christin Jose	2022	Saina Audios	
Vazhi Nadathidum (From "Ward-126")	Sunitha Sarathy, Senthuzhan	2021	Saregama	
Nee Vithaitha (From "Ward-126")	Aslam Abdul Majeed	2021	Saregama	
Kaalam Azhagai (From "Ward-126")	K. S. Harishankar	2021	Saregama	
Kan Munnale	Swetha Mohan	2021	Sony Music Entertainment	
Nambala		2020	Sony Music Entertainment	
Whispering Hues	Rajhesh Vaidhya	2020	Sony Music Entertainment	
Chusthundhi Pila		2020	Sony Music Entertainment	
Paakura Ponnu		2019	Sony Music Entertainment	
