= Kannum Kannum Kollaiyadithaal =

2020 Tamil film by Desingh Periyasamy

- Theatrical release poster
- Directed by: Desingh Periyasamy
- Written by: Desingh Periyasamy Telugu Dialogues - Samrat, Rajesh Malakedi and Karthik
- Produced by: Anto Joseph; Viacom 18 Studios
- Starring: Dulquer Salmaan; Ritu Varma; Rakshan; Niranjani Ahathian
- Cinematography: K. M. Bhaskaran
- Edited by: Praveen Anthony
- Music by: Songs: Masala Coffee; Harshavardhan Rameshwar; Background Score: Harshavardhan Rameshwar
- Production companies: Anto Joseph Film Company; Viacom18 Motion Pictures
- Release date: 28 February 2020
- Running time: 160 minutes
- Country: India
- Language: Tamil

Kannum Kannum Kollaiyadithaal (transl. 'If eyes steal each other') is a 2020 Indian Tamil-language romantic heist comedy film written and directed by Desingh Periyasamy (in his directorial debut). The film stars Dulquer Salmaan, Ritu Varma, Rakshan, and Niranjani Ahathian. Gautham Vasudev Menon and Uday Mahesh play supporting roles. Kannum Kannum Kollaiyadithaal marked the debuts of Rakshan and Nirinjani. The plot is centred on a pair of con artists who engage in various scams while juggling romantic relationships.

Development of the film began in 2017, when Salmaan showed interest in collaborating with Periyasamy. Principal photography took place in Goa and Delhi from 18 November 2017 to 24 July 2018. The film features a score composed by Masala Coffee and Harshavardhan Rameshwar.

The film was released on 28 February 2020 and was successful at the box office.

== Plot ==
Siddharth and Kallis (Kaliswaran) are two young IT professionals living a seemingly rich lifestyle. Meera (a beautician) and Shreya (a chef) are their girlfriends, respectively. Siddharth and Kallis are actually con artists who use online shopping scams to earn money. They buy genuine laptops using false identities, swap genuine internal parts with fake ones, return the laptops for a refund, and sell the genuine internal parts to make money. One such laptop with fake parts ends up with Prathap Chakravarthi, a Deputy Commissioner of Police (DCP), and catches fire. Chakravarthi traces the purchase and zeros in on Siddharth and Kallis. Siddharth and Kallis figure out that the police are suspecting them and want to switch to stealing cars instead of modifying computers.

In the meantime, a thief steals Meera's bag, and she complains to Siddharth that she has lost her hard-earned money. Siddharth feels guilty and decides that he and Kaliswaran should mend their ways. They take all their money and relocate to Goa with their girlfriends and plan to start a restaurant and a beauty parlour.

Chakravarthi appears in Goa and confronts the hotel cabin with the police. The men initially assume that they are the police's target. However, they are shocked when Chakravarthi reveals that he is looking for the two women who fled just before he arrived. Siddharth and Kallis realise Meera and Shreya are romance scammers, and they pretended to be their girlfriends just to steal their money.

After some investigation, they figure out that Meera and Shreya, who have forged new identities, are in Delhi and are preparing for their next scam. The women are shocked that Siddharth and Kallis have found them and returned their money, all while asking them to leave. Siddharth proposes that they work together to steal ₹80 million (equivalent to ₹100 million or US$1.1 million in 2026) from Sooraj Mehta, a rich businessman, and that if the women love them, they should remain together; if not, they should split the loot and part ways. The women agree and reveal their new names as Madhu and Varsha.

Madhu assumes a new identity (Ishita) and befriends Mehta during his yoga class. Varsha befriends his wife, while Siddarth and Kaliswaran plan to break into the couple's house by planting a secret camera on Madhu's phone, which records from his Rolls Royce all the way to the safe containing the money. In the process, Siddharth realises that Sooraj is a drug lord, since they witness him killing someone. The others are scared to continue, but Siddharth persuades them to continue by suggesting that they flee the country after the heist to avoid Mehta's wrath.

On the day of the heist, Varsha is to spend the day shopping with Mehta's wife, and Madhu is to stay with Mehta at his guest house while Siddharth and Kaliswaran loot the house. They steal Mehta's car while it is parked at his farmhouse by hacking it with an app Siddharth had created, and they use the car to enter Mehta's compound. Siddharth and Kaliswaran use a 3D-printed thumbprint to open a locker and steal money, while Madhu fakes an illness to leave Mehta's house. To avoid suspicion at the airport, the group opt to travel to Thailand by road. DCP Chakravarthi appears in Delhi and starts checking the vehicles leaving the city, but Siddharth misdirects him and shakes him off.

Back in Chennai, Chakravarthi is being questioned by the Central Bureau of Investigation for going out of the way to look for two women who are small-scale cheaters. Chakravarthi remains silent, but he reminisces about being a victim of Madhu's guile in the past, which explains why he took a personal interest in nabbing her. The young lovers are shown camping on their way to Thailand, and it is implied they the boys and girls may still not be completely honest with each other.

== Cast ==
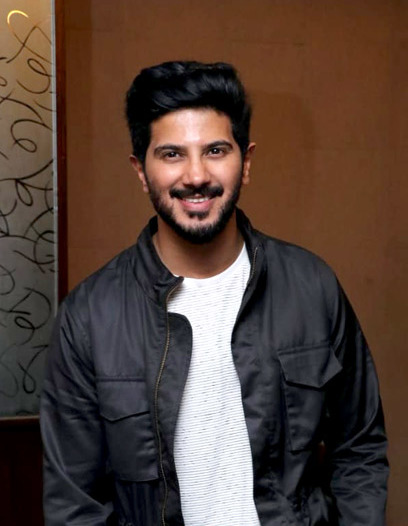
Dulquer Salmaan

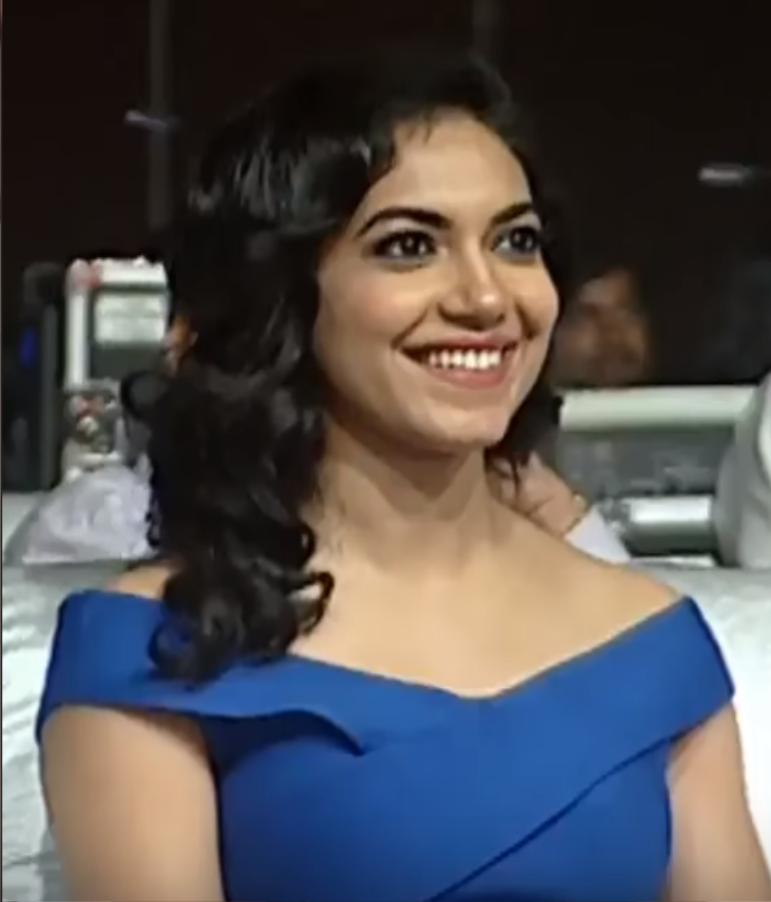
Ritu Varma

- Dulquer Salmaan as Siddharth
- Ritu Varma as Meera/Madhu/Ishita
- Rakshan as Kallis (Kaliswaran)
- Niranjani Ahathian as Shreya/Varsha/Thenmozhi, Meera 's friend, Kallis' love interest
- Gautham Vasudev Menon as DCP Prathap Chakravarthi
- Anish Yohan Kuruvilla as Sooraj Mehta
- Vikash Rajendran as Amjith; Prathap's assistant
- Tiger Garden Thangadurai as a two-wheeler mechanic
- Ameesha Chowdhary as Mrs Mehta, Sooraj's wife
- Udhayabhanu Maheshwaran as a CBI Higher Official
- Gajaraj as a house owner
- Lakshmi as Mrs Chakravarthi, Prathap's wife
- Baby Monika Siva as Prathap's daughter
- Kathir as Prathap's son
- Jacquline Lydia as Kaliswaran's friend

== Production ==
=== Development ===
In 2014, Vikram Prabhu's Sigaram Thodu dealt with a credit card scam. So, I had to tweak the script and chose the topic of product tampering.

— Periyaswamy on his inspiration for the plot, 2020

Desingh Periyasamy wanted Dulquer Salmaan as the lead actor in his film after being impressed by Salmaan's performance in Vaayai Moodi Pesavum (2014). Salmaan agreed to do the film before committing to another proposed Tamil film by director Ra. Karthik. Periyasamy revealed that the film would be a "romantic thriller", with Salmaan portraying a "happy-go-lucky" youngster in the film. The film was initially scheduled to start production in July 2017, but faced a delay while the team searched for a suitable lead actress. Ritu Varma joined the team as the lead actress in September 2017. Rakshan, a television anchor, was also selected to make his acting debut in the film. In November 2017, the film was titled Kannum Kannum Kollaiyadithaal, inspired by a song composed by A. R. Rahman in Mani Ratnam's Thiruda Thiruda (1993).

=== Filming ===
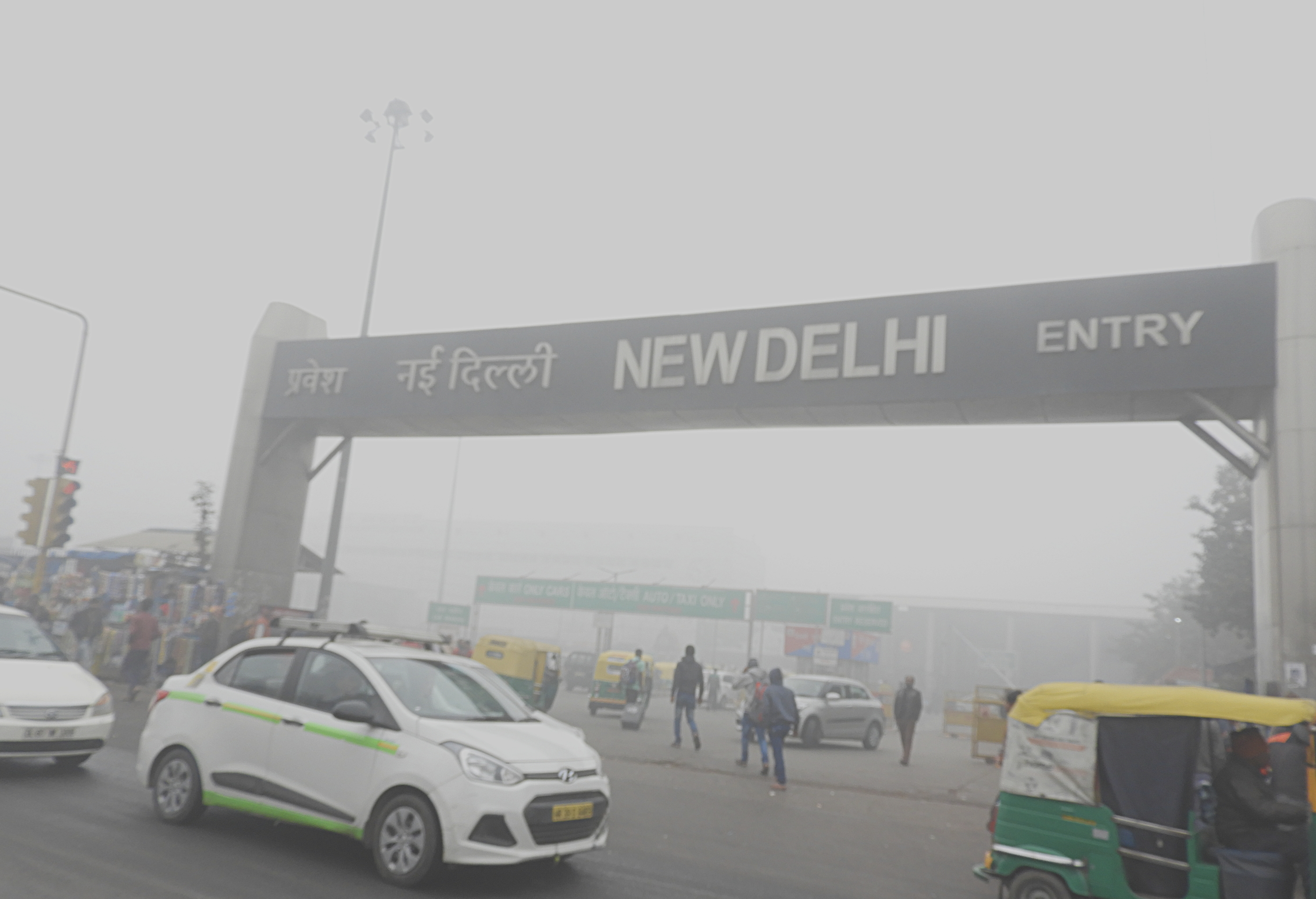
Smog in Delhi in 2017 caused a delay in filming.

Production work began in Delhi on 15 November 2017, with Salmaan joining the shoot three days later, when an official launch ceremony was held. The shoot was briefly disrupted by smog in Delhi. In early December, the second schedule began in Goa, with shoots using beaches as the backdrop. The third and final shooting period of the film began in Chennai during late January 2018, and lasted more than a month. In July 2018, it was reported that the filming was nearing completion, with only five days of shooting left.

== Soundtrack ==
Kannum Kannum Kollaiyadithal

Soundtrack album by Masala Coffee, Harshavardhan Rameshwar
- Released: 21 February 2020
- Genre: Soundtrack
- Length: 21:07
- Language: Tamil
- Label: Zee Music Company
- Producer: Masala Coffee

Masala Coffee chronology
Mundina Nildana (2019)	Kannum Kannum Kollaiyadithal (2020)	Sila Nodigalil (2023)

Harshavardhan Rameshwar chronology
Pressure Cooker (2020)	Kannum Kannum Kollayadithal (2020)	Raju Gari Kidnap (2020)
External audio
- Official Audio Jukebox on YouTube

Singles from Kannum Kannum Kollaiyadithaal
- 1. "Ennai Vittu" Released: 14 February 2020; 2. "Sirikkalam Parakkalam" Released: 21 February 2020

The soundtrack was composed by Masala Coffee and Harshavardhan Rameshwar. The latter also composed the background score. The first single track was released on 14 February 2020, and the entire album was released on 21 February 2020.

=== Critical response to the soundtrack ===
Jyothi Prabhakar of The Times of India expressed a mixed opinion towards the soundtrack, stating that the tracks "do sound peppy and upbeat in the beginning, but by the time you're done with the album, composed by Masala Coffee, the overload of percussion, same type of beats, tunes and lyrical treatment begin to seem overbearing."

Sudhir Srinivasan of The New Indian Express stated that the soundtrack was "too awfully similar to Passenger's Let Her Go", but she otherwise "quite enjoyed the music of this film".

Track listing
No.	Title	Lyrics	Music	Singer(s)	Length
1.	"Sirikkalam Parakkalam"	Desingh Periyasamy, Madurai Souljour	Masala Coffee	Benny Dayal, Madurai Souljour	3:16
2.	"Ennai Vittu"	Vignesh Shivan	Masala Coffee	Ranjith	3:53
3.	"Yelo Pullelo"	Mani Amudhavan	Masala Coffee	Anirudh Ravichander	3:26
4.	"Kanave Nee Naan"	Hafeez Rumi, Desingh Periyasamy	Masala Coffee	Sooraj Santhosh	2:05
5.	"Ennil Nee"	Desingh Periyasamy	Harshavardhan Rameshwar	Janani SV	2:19
6.	"Assai Illa"	Harshavardhan Rameshwar	Harshavardhan Rameshwar	Harshavardhan Rameshwar	1:19
7.	"Kannum Kannum Kollaiyadithaal"	Gouthami Ashok	Harshavardhan Rameshwar	Gouthami Ashok	1:08
8.	"Maaga Maaga"	V Lakshmi Priya	Harshavardhan Rameshwar	Harshavardhan Rameshwar, Kavya Ajit, Janani SV	3:41
Total length:					21:07

== Release and reception ==
The film was released on 28 February 2020 worldwide, along with its Telugu-dubbed version, titled Kanulu Kanulanu Dochayante. The film opened well in multiplexes in Tamil Nadu, Telangana, and Kerala, with ₹7.86 million (US$82,000) being collected in Chennai from 192 screens in the first seven days of release.

=== Critical response ===
The reaction from the audience was so good that I still get goosebumps thinking about it. I would do anything to relive that moment and experience it again.

— Ritu Varma on the success of the film, 2020

The film received positive reviews from critics and audiences. Writing for The Times of India, M Suganth gave the film three-and-a-half out of five stars and said that "Kannum Kannum Kollaiyadithaal is a winsome romantic thriller with charming leads and edge-of-the-seat moments. Desingh Periyasamy displays a flair for this material both in his writing and making."

Likewise, S Subhakeerthana of The Indian Express rated the film three-and-a-half out of five stars and praised the film's comedic timing, writing that "The film rides on clever writing and performances. Some of the funniest moments of Kannum Kannum Kollaiyadithaal are those that involve Dulquer Salmaan and Rakshan."

Sify gave the film three-and-a-half out of five and noted that although the film was longer than average films, the "con angle" keeps the viewer engaged, writing that "Desingh Periyasamy has delivered an enjoyable romantic entertainer with enough brainy moments that keeps you hooked till the end."

Writing for Firstpost, Sreedhar Pillai gave the film three-and-a-quarter out of five stars and said that "Kannum Kannum Kollaiyadithaal looks fresh, and is an enjoyable rom-com or more appropriately, a rip-roaring con ride, mainly owing to its smart writing." Anupama Subramanian wrote for the Deccan Chronicle that "Debutant director Desingh Periyasamy's Kannum Kannum Kollaiyadithaal is a synthesis of a rom-com and a modern crime caper, without any pretence or preachiness. So it makes for a fun-filled ride."

The Hindu said that "Director Desingh Periyasamy does a commendable job of putting together a film that lets the script be [the] hero, and keeps you guessing and entertained".

Based on the positive feedback from audiences on Twitter, The Times of India reported that "Dulquer Salmaan and Ritu Varma's romantic thriller is doing better than what was expected by experts."

=== Accolades ===
Award	Date of ceremony	Category	Recipient(s) and nominee(s)	Result	Ref
9th South Indian International Movie Awards	18-19 September 2021	Best Actor	Dulquer Salmaan	Nominated	
9th South Indian International Movie Awards	18-19 September 2021	Best Debutant	Ritu Varma	Won	
9th South Indian International Movie Awards	18-19 September 2021	Best Debutant	Rakshan	Nominated	
67th Filmfare Awards South	9 October 2022	Filmfare Award for Best Film – Tamil	Kannum Kannum Kollaiyadithaal	Nominated	
67th Filmfare Awards South	9 October 2022	Filmfare Award for Best Director – Tamil	Desingh Periyasamy	Nominated	
67th Filmfare Awards South	9 October 2022	Best Actor – Tamil	Dulquer Salmaan	Nominated	
67th Filmfare Awards South	9 October 2022	Filmfare Award for Best Supporting Actor – Tamil	Gautham Vasudev Menon	Nominated	

== Potential sequel ==
In an interview, Dulquer Salmaan told Firstpost that Desingh Periyasamy had made plans for a sequel and had narrated the opening 15 minutes of the plot to the team.
