= Vinay Bharadwaj =

Indian-Singapore filmmaker

- Born: Vinay Kumar; Bangalore, Karnataka, India
- Occupations: Television Host, Film Maker, Designer
- Years active: 2015–present

Vinay Bharadwaj is an Indian-Singapore-based ex-banker turned filmmaker, television host, motivational speaker, and entrepreneur. After working for a decade in banking, he quit to start his own show to promote cancer awareness after he lost a loved one to the disease. His started hosting shows on YouTube called “Let’s Talk with Vinay”. He shot to fame in Karnataka for hosting the stylish Kannada talk show called "Mathu Kathe Vinay Jothe" on Star Suvarna channel and Hot Star.

He made his international debut as a host with the show called "Salaam Namasthe Singapore" on Colors TV APAC. Since then he has hosted many popular shows on international feeds of Indian channels. His latest show "Star Talk With Vinay - South Meets North" premiered in 130 countries across the world which had some of the biggest names from the movie industry like Vidya Balan, Tabu, Rana Daggubati, Santosh Sivan, R. Balki, Aditi Rao Hydari. He got into film making in 2017 with short films and made his debut as a feature film-maker through the Kannada film 'Mundina Nildana' and went on to make a Tamil film ‘Sila Nodigalil’. Vinay also co-founded a digital marketing and a creative studio called Mavendoer in 2020 which has presence in Singapore, India and Dubai. He is also a motivational speaker who does public speaking at corporates and colleges.

== Early life ==
Vinay Bharadwaj was born in Bangalore. He completed his schooling at Kumaran's School (SKCH) and Bachelors of Business Management (BBM) at Bangalore University. At the age of 21, he moved to Singapore to pursue an MBA from the University of Wales and since then he has settled there. Post his MBA he started his corporate career in Singapore Indian Chamber of Commerce and Industry. He moved to Standard Chartered Bank in Singapore where he handled various country and global roles for 9 years. In parallel to his corporate career, he started his fashion label.

== Career ==
=== Fashion career ===
Vinay began his fashion label "Shinayele" in Bangalore along with his childhood friend at his garage. His career began with bridal wear and Indian fusion clothing in June 2014. Vinay's designs focus on using Indian fabrics to create western and fusion clothing.

=== Television career ===
His first series 'Bangalore Edition', had 20 guests spanning from different walks of life and fields and was started on YouTube on a weekly basis from January 2016. He had some of the best of Bangalore like Biocon Founder, Kiran Mazumdar Shaw, billiards world champion Pankaj Advani, badminton champion Ashwini Ponnappa, cricketer K. L. Rahul, musician Raghu Dixit, singer and actor Vasundhara Das, Kannada superstar Puneeth Rajkumar and 12 others.

Post this he started the second city'Chennai Edition' in May 2016 on YouTube and hosted 25 stalwarts like Padma Vibhushan Dr.V Shanta, Padma Bhushan Singer Sudha Raghunathan, Actor Padma Shri Vivek, Apollo Hospital granddaughter Upasna Kammineni, Ace music director Devi Sri Prasad, singers Srinivas, Karthik, Chinmayi and 17 more.

His third edition was a Kannada show on one of the Kannada channels of Karnataka, Star Suvarna, with celebrities from Karnataka Film Industry. Along with casual conversations and much entertainment with celebrities, each episode had a short segment with a doctor and patient speaking about different types of illness.

Actress Deepika Padukone's family friend and trustee of her organization (The Live Love Laugh Foundation), Anna Chandy was one of the guests on Bharadwaj's Bangalore Edition. Anna and Vinay collaborated in mid-2016 to do a short web series called 'Mind Check Conversations with Anna' to dispel myths about mental health.

He made his international television debut through a successful show called "Salaam Namaste Singapore" which brought together the best of Indian origin people, places and stories together. The show which was telecasted in 14 countries across APAC region was an instant success which led Vinay to bag a celebrity talk show on StarPlus.

"Star Talk with Vinay- South Meets North" was a concept that Vinay created which featured 12 celebrities who are originally from South India or started their career in South Indian Film Industry. The show which was aired on StarPlus, Star Vijay and Asianet, premiered in 130 countries across the world (outside India).

=== Film career ===
Vinay Bharadwaj got into the direction in 2017. His first short film was on organ donation in which Sudha Rani, play the lead role. Since then he has directed short films in India and Singapore, created documentaries for The Akshaya Patra Foundation and designer Manish Malhotra, and conceptualized and directed music videos. He penned and directed his first Kannada feature film titled Mundina Nildana. An urban love story set in Bangalore which was released in 2019 and was appreciated by the audience and critics.

== Filmography ==
Year	Title	Language	Notes
2019	Mundina Nildana	Kannada	
2020	#CoffeeShots	English	Web series in Singapore
2021	#WhiteCoatWarriors	Hindi-English	Indian docu-film
2023	Sila Nodigalil	Tamil	

=== Television ===
Year	Title	Role	Channel
2016	Let's Talk with Vinay-Bangalore Edition	Host & Concept	YouTube
2016	Let's Talk with Vinay-Chennai Edition	Host & Concept	YouTube
2016	Mind Check-Conversations with Anna	Host	YouTube-Mind Check
2017	Mathu Kathe Vinay Jothe	Host & Concept	Hot Star & Star Suvarna
2017	Salaam Namaste Singapore Season 1	Host & Production	Colors APAC
2018	Star Talk with Vinay-South Meets North	Host & Concept	StarPlus, Star Vijay & Asianet
2018	Salaam Namaste Singapore Season 2	Host & Production	Colors APAC
2019	Salaam Namaste Singapore Season 3	Host & Production	Colors APAC
2019	Vanakkam Singapore	Host & Production	Colors Tamil APAC
2020	Colors Candid Conversations	Host & Concept	Colors APAC
2022	Salaam Namaste Singapore Season 4	Host & Concept	Colors APAC
2023	Salaam Namaste Singapore Season 5	Host & Concept	Colors APAC
2024	Star Talk With Vinay - South Meets North Season 2	Host & Concept	Star Plus, Star Vijay, Asianet

== Awards and honors ==
- 22 October 2016 - "Best Social Activist for the year 2016" at 3rd CIMB National Awards 2016 hosted by Council for Media and Satellite Broadcasting(CMSB)
- 10 December 2016 - "Rotary BSE SME National Award for Excellence in Entrepreneurship 2016" at 5th AD ASREA 2016 Awards hosted by Rotary Bangalore South East
- 28 January 2017 - Felicitation as a special guest (Host of the TV show Mathu Kathe Vinay Jothe) at Mrs. India-Karnataka 2016
- 28 August 2018 - "Finalist-Citizen of the year-2018" Namma Bengaluru Awards
- In 9th South Indian International Movie Awards won best feature film for Mundina Nildana
