= List of educational institutions in Salem, India =

This is a list of educational institutions in Salem, India.

== Engineering colleges ==
- Government College of Engineering, Salem
- Indian Institute of Handloom Technology, Salem
- Knowledge Institute of Technology, Salem
- Sona College of Technology, Salem
- Mahendra College of Engineering, Salem
- Sri Ganesh Engineering College, Salem
- AVS Engineering College, Salem
- AVS college of technology, Salem .

== Medical College ==
- Government Mohan Kumaramangalam Medical College, Salem
- Vinayaka Missions University, Salem
- Annapoorana Medical College and Hospital, Salem

== Law ==
- Government Law College, Salem
- The Central Law College, Salem

== Film and television ==
- Salem Film school, Yercaud main road, Salem

== Schools ==
- Glazebrooke matriculation higher secondary School, reddiyur Salem 636004
- The Gugai Higher Secondary School, Line Medu, Gugai, Salem 636006
- Kongu Matriculation Higher Secondary School, Vellakalpatti, Salem - 636012
- St.Paul's Higher Secondary School, Salem - 7
- Little Flower Higher Secondary School, Salem - 7
- Holy Cross Matriculation Higher Secondary School, Salem
- L.E.F. Eden Garden Matriculation School
- Golden Gates Matriculation Higher Secondary School
- Shevaroy's Valley School, Yercaud, Salem
- Government Higher Secondary School, Tholasampatty, Salem
- St.Joseph's Matriculation Higher Secondary School, Gugai, Salem
- Emerald Valley Public School
