= Masala Coffee =

Indian music band

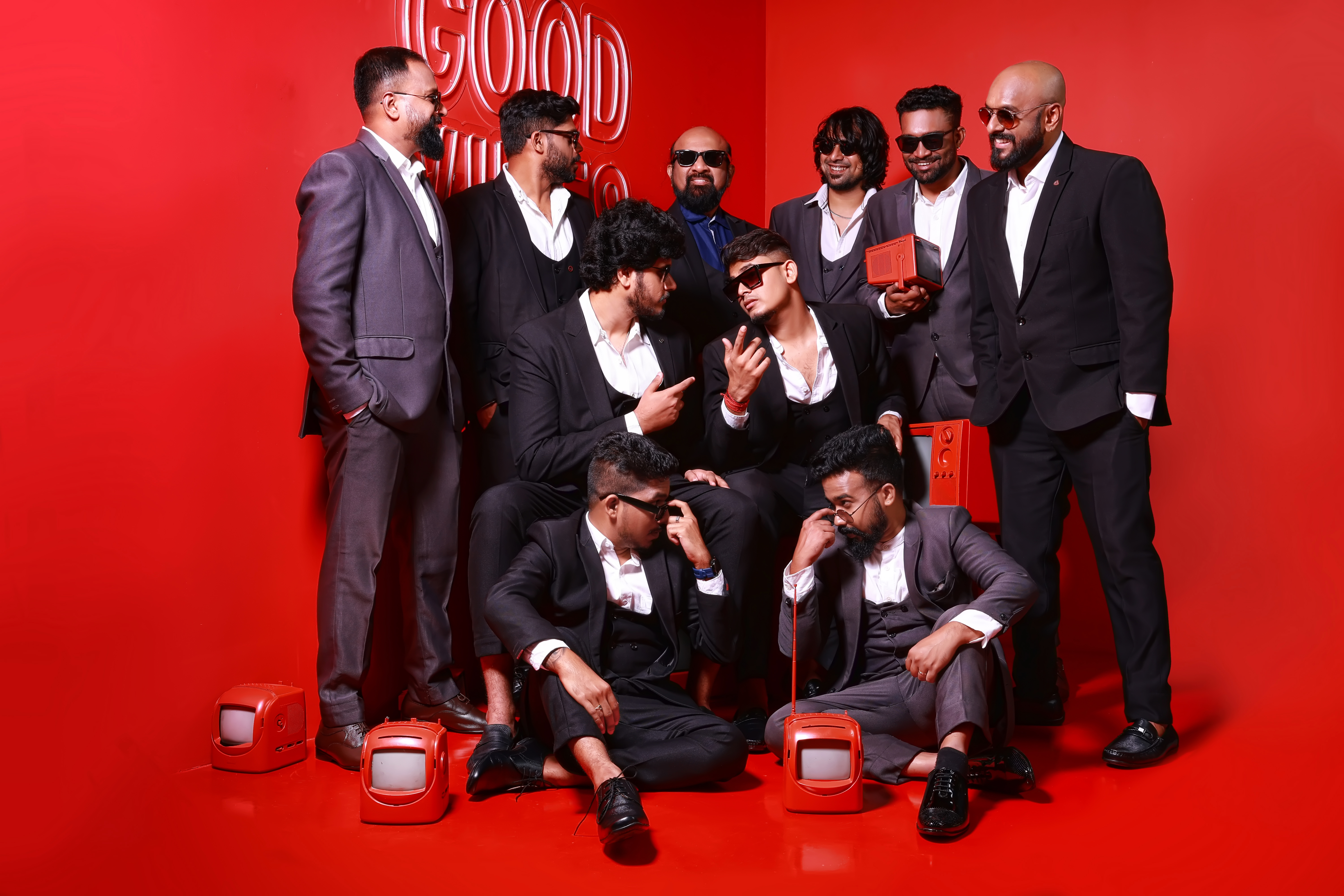
- Masala Coffee in 2024

Background information
- Genres: Indian folk, Indian pop, Indian rock, Blues, Reggae
- Years active: 2014–present
- Members: Varun Sunil (Percussion/Vocals); Abhijith Anilkumar (Vocals); Razik Mujawar (Vocals); Daya Sankar (Drums); Surya Bharadwaj (Guitar); Pauly (Bass); Pranav k s (Keyboard); AmalSivan (Violin)

Masala Coffee is an Indian music band founded in 2014. The band performs across various genres - Indian folk, blues, pop and rock. Although they primarily compose original music and covers in Malayalam, the band also performs in Hindi, Tamil, Telugu, Kannada, Punjabi and English. Masala Coffee has also made a name for itself through the music they've composed and performed for movies including Solo, Uriyadi, Mundina Nildana and Kannum Kannum Kollaiyadithaal.

== History ==
The band was founded by Varun Sunil in 2014. The band was named "Masala Coffee" to signify the different kind of music they play (alternative folk rock).

They debuted on Kappa TV’s Music Mojo in 2014, performing their own unique versions of popular Tamil songs like “Munbe Vaa” and “Snehithane”. Videos of their performance went viral and the band soon achieved widespread fame through social media.

When the members of Masala Coffee first jammed together, it was not with the intention of forming a band. However, following the enthusiastic reception their melodious style of music received, Masala Coffee was officially formed and has never looked back.

Later in 2024, Two new lead vocalists Abhijit Anilkumar & Razik Mujawar joined the band after the previous members left Masala Coffee.

== Band Members ==
As of 2024, Masala Coffee consists of the following members:

- Varun Sunil
- Abhijit Anilkumar
- Razik Mujawar
- Amalsivan
- Dayasankar
- Paul Joseph
- Surya Bharadwaj
- Pranav KS

== Albums ==
Masala Coffee announced the release of its debut album, Kimaya, in 2018. The album is composed of ten songs in Tamil, Malayalam and Hindi, including updated versions of some of their original songs in addition to all new tracks. “Arivaal” was the first of the album’s songs to be released in November 2018, followed soon after by the Hindi track “Safar.” The band has since released a few more songs and music videos, with the rest of the album due to be released sequentially.

Masala Coffee has worked on new singles after their new line up has been made one, of which is “Aadiyillalo Anthamillalo”, a song that tries to remind the listener that everyone dies, as well as “Manitham”, a song that reflects on a period of survival for humankind and urges the listener to look for positives in these distressing times.

The band announced their upcoming album, titled ''Ektara'' which will have 13 songs from multiple languages.

== Film composing ==
Masala Coffee's first foray into the world of cinema was the performance of a satirical song on liquor ban for the movie Kunjiramayanam directed by Basil Joseph.

The band debuted into film music direction in 2016 with the title track in a promo video for the Malayalam movie Hello Namasthe. Its first major composing was three songs for Uriyadi, a Tamil movie directed by Vijay Kumar. Masala Coffee is also one of the composers for the movie Solo, directed by Bejoy Nambiar.

They scored the music for the Dulquer Salmaan starring-movie Kannum Kannum Kollaiyadithaal, which was released in 2020.

The promotional song "Fan Maaro" for the 2023 Tamil-language film Sila Nodigalil (starring Richard Rishi) was composed by Masala Coffee.

== Filmography ==
Year	Film	Language	Notes
2016	Uriyadi	Tamil	
2016	Hello Namasthe	Malayalam	Promo song
2017	Solo	Malayalam/Tamil	1 song - World of Siva
2019	Mundina Nildana	Kannada	1 song - Manase Maya
2020	Kannum Kannum Kollaiyadithaal	Tamil	
2023	Sila Nodigalil	Tamil	1 song - Fun Maaro

== Major events - in Chronological Order ==
Date	Event	Venue	Ref
17 March 2017	Dubai Global Village	Dubai Global Village, UAE	
25 November 2016	Sarvesh Festival of Arts	Victoria Hall, Singapore	
22 October 2016	Malaysian Independent Live Fusion Festival	StarXpo Centre, Kuala Lumpur	
11 September 2015	Raag 'N' Rock - The Indie Music Festival	Al Nasr Leisureland, Dubai	
20 February 2015	Mojo Rising Music Fest	Bolgatty Palace Grounds, Kochi	
8 November 2016	The Hindu November Fest	The Music Academy, Chennai	
19 February 2017	The Global ISAI Festival	Phoenix MarketCity, Chennai	
17 July 2017	Hyderabad Arts Festival	Cyber Convention Center, Madhapur	
11 August 2017	AURA'17	Pondicherry Institute of Medical Sciences (PIMS)	
26 January 2018	The GoMad Festival	Fernhills Royal Palace, Ooty	
30 April 2018	Masala Coffee Singapore Tour	Esplanade - Theatres on the Bay, Singapore	
10 July 2022	Eximus	IM, Bangalore	
28 April 2023	Masala Coffee USA Tour	The Micheal & Son Sportsplex, USA	
8 October 2023	Manipur Rising	Sunday Soul Sante, Hyderabad	
12 November 2023	The Swiggy SteppinOut	Jayamahal Palace, Bangalore	
2019	Masala Coffee Europe Tour	Various	
1 February 2024	Masala Coffee Ireland Tour	Limerick, Ireland	
