= Darshana KT =

Indian playback singer (born 1984)

Darshana
- Born: 6 November 1984 (age 41)
- Origin: Chennai, India
- Genres: Playback singing Jingles
- Occupation: Singer
- Years active: 2007–present

Darshana KT (born 6 November 1984) is an Indian Tamil playback singer, music composer and artist for films in India. She is currently residing in Chicago and shuttles between India and the US for her music projects. She is best known for her debut song "Maduraikku Pogathadi" from the film Azhagiya Thamizh Magan.

== Music Composer ==
Year	Movie	Language
2023	Sila Nodigalil	Tamil

== Filmography ==
Year	Movie	Song	Music director	Language
2024	Captain Miller	Palanaati	G. V. Prakash	Tamil
2023	Sila Nodigalil	Tholai Vaanam	Darshana KT	Tamil
2021	Galatta Kalyanam	Sooraavali Ponnu	A.R. Rahman	Tamil
2019	Kaappaan	Kurilae Kurilae	Harris Jayaraj	Tamil
2017	Meyaadha Maan	Nee Mattum Pothum	Pradeep Kumar	Tamil
2017	Mom	Maufi Mushkil	A.R. Rahman	Hindi
2017	Bairavaa	Azhagiya Soodana Poovey	Santhosh Narayanan	Tamil
2015	O Kadhal Kanmani	Kaara Aattakkaara	A.R. Rahman	Tamil
2015	O Kadhal Kanmani	Theera Ulaa	A.R. Rahman	Tamil
2015	OK Bangaram	Raara Aatagaada	A.R. Rahman	Telugu (Dubbed version)
2015	OK Bangaram	Neetho Alaa	A.R. Rahman	Telugu (Dubbed version)
2015	OK Bangaram	Mental Madhilo (Female version)	A.R. Rahman	Telugu (Dubbed version)
2012	Pizza	Engo Oduginraai	Santhosh Narayanan	Tamil
2011	Udhayan	Lakka Lakka	Manikanth Kadri	Tamil
2011	Ponnar Shankar	Malar Villale	Ilaiyaraaja	Tamil
2011	Kanchana	Karuppu Perazhaga	S. Thaman	Tamil
2009	Vedigundu Murugesan	Kaapi Kottai	Dhina	Tamil
2008	Jaane Tu Ya Jaane Na	Pappu Can't Dance Saala	A.R. Rahman	Hindi
2008	Jaane Tu Ya Jaane Na	Nazrein Milana	A.R. Rahman	Hindi
2007	Athidhi	Valla Valla	Mani Sharma	Telugu
2007	Azhagiya Thamizh Magan	Maduraikki Pogathadi	A.R. Rahman	Tamil

== Independent Single/Album ==
Year	Composer	Song	Language
2014	KT	Vaan Thirakinra Pozhuthil	Tamil
2012	KT	Unnai Ninaithen	Tamil

== Awards and nominations ==
- Nominated, Filmfare Award for Best Female Playback Singer – Tamil for the song Maduraikku Pogatheydi. (2007)
