= Karan Acharya =

Indian graphic artist

- Born: Kudlu, Kasaragod district, Kerala, India
- Known for: Graphic art

Karan Acharya is an Indian graphic artist. He is known for his depiction of Hanuman and other works. He is inspired by the artist Raja Ravi Verma.

== Early life and education ==
Karan was raised in the Kudlu village in the Kasaragod district of Kerala, in a family that included several artists, including his mother Manjula, his uncle Yagnesh, and grandfather Ramachandra Acharya. He completed 12th grade at Tagore College Vidyanagar in 2003 and then continued to study art for two years under mentors including Laxmish Acharya and Girish Acharya. After his studies he took up a job as an arts teacher in a private school. Subsequently, Acharya completed a course in animation and started working for a private company as an animator in Mangaluru. He has worked on story boards and character designs for movies.

== Rudra Hanuman graphic ==
In 2015 on the request of his friends, Acharya designed this graphic as a flag for the annual temple festival in his village consisting of a graphic of Hanuman with black outlines and saffron shades. It was posted on social media and became a popular image across nation, with vehicles sporting the stickers of the graphic on their rear windscreens. In 2017, a trend was noticed in Bangalore with the Hanuman graphic spotted across windscreens of several vehicles in the city. Acharya gets no royalties from sticker creators or manufacturers, though he states he is pleased his work is being seen by others and that his work went viral in 3 years. In May 2018, he sought copyright protection after a Kannada film maker tried to use the angry Hanuman image for a poster of his film without his permission.

== Other works ==
In February 2017 Acharya designed a blue graphic of Shiva based on the lines of the grand Adi Yogi bust statue at Isha foundation in Coimbatore. In 2018, he began a company to sell his artwork on t-shirts, after obtaining the copyright on his Hanuman art.

The prime minister of India Narendra Modi praised him for his work, calling the work a pride during his visit to the city for an election rally in 2018. Later in May that year he sketched a painting of the Prime minister Narendra Modi. He was also invited to the Ayodhya art festival in Uttar Pradesh, and was part of the first Mangaluru literary festival. In August 2019, he designed the teaser poster the movie Mundina Nildana. In 2020, Acharya took to social media and has been creating art on requests by common people as per their aspirations using photoshop manipulation techniques. Owing to his popularity he received over 2000 requests for photo edits. While he does few of them free of cost, for some he charges fees.
