= Valatty =

2023 Indian film

- Theatrical release poster
- Directed by: Devan Jayakumar
- Written by: Devan Jayakumar
- Produced by: Vijay Babu
- Starring: Roshan Mathew; Sunny Wayne; Soubin Shahir; Vijay Babu; Naslen; Mahima Nambiar; Raveena Ravi; Aju Varghese
- Cinematography: Vishnu Panicker
- Edited by: Ayoob Khan
- Music by: Varun Sunil
- Production company: Friday Film House
- Distributed by: Friday Film House
- Release date: 21 July 2023
- Running time: 113 minutes
- Country: India
- Language: Malayalam

Valatty: Tale of Tails (transl. Wagging tail) is a 2023 Indian Malayalam-language adventure-comedy romance film written and directed by Devan Jayakumar and produced by Vijay Babu of Friday Film House. It stars Vijay Babu, Mahima Nambiar and Rohini in lead roles and also features the voices of Roshan Mathew, Sunny Wayne, Soubin Shahir, Naslen, Raveena Ravi, Indrans and Aju Varghese. According to the makers, Valatty is the first Indian film to use real dogs as actors without VFX.

== Plot ==
Tomy is a Golden Retriever owned by Roy who falls in love with Amalu, a Cocker Spaniel owned by a neighbouring family headed by Swamy. Following Tomy's frequent interactions with Amalu, Swamy visits Roy and expresses his concerns. One day, Swamy learns from Anand, his future son-in-law, that Amalu is pregnant. Swamy and his mother suspect that Tomy is responsible for Amalu's pregnancy, and eventually, both Tomy and Amalu get locked up in their houses by their respective owners. Tomy's friend, Poovan, a rooster, tells him to elope with Amalu and advises him to come back after the puppies are born.

One night, Tomy and Amalu elope and meet an old, abandoned Labrador Retriever in the street. The Labrador helps Tomy and Amalu get food and shares his past. A rottweiler named Bruno tries to attack Sumathi, a street food vendor, and is saved by Tomy. Upon the Labrador's advice, Tomy and Amalu follow Sumathi to her house. Sumathi's Indian pariah, Haridas, alias Karidas, becomes friends with Tomy and Amalu.

One day, Amalu is captured by Bhasi, who works for Narendradas Karanavar, an evil scientist who runs an unauthorised drug trial facility to conduct tests on abducted dogs. Tomy and Karidas try to chase Bhasi's van but get confused on divided roads. They later find Margaret, an Afghan Hound, who tells them to use their smelling capacity to find Amalu.

While searching for Amalu, Tomy and Karidas find Tippu, a young American Staffordshire Terrier, who misleads them to Bruno. Bruno chases Tomy and Karidas and accidentally falls into a pit. Tomy helps Bruno escape from the pit, and Bruno shares his past with Tomy and Karidas. Bruno tells about his prosperous life with an old couple and how he was used by Bhasi for illegal dog fighting. Bruno later joins Tomy and Karidas to search for Amalu. Tomy and Bruno see Bhasi capturing a dog and start following his van.

On the way, Karidas gets hit and injured by a truck when he tries to save Tomy. Karidas tells Tomy to leave him and asks him to continue looking for Amalu. Bruno and Tomy reach the drug trial facility by following Bhasi's van and start searching for Amalu. Tomy finds and saves Amalu, who was about to be injected by Roshan, Narendradas Karanavar's son. When Bhasi blocks Tomy and Amalu, Bruno saves them by attacking Bhasi. Tomy releases some of the abducted dogs, and one of them attacks Narendradas Karanavar.

Amalu gives birth to puppies while escaping, and the next day, Anand finds Tomy, Amalu, and the puppies near the main road. He takes them to his house and then to their respective owners. Sumathi, who was worried about Karidas's absence, finds Bruno and takes him to her house. Karidas is rescued by the Indian Army's dog squad and becomes a well-trained canine. The police raid the drug trial facility and arrest Narendradas Karanavar and Roshan. The Dog Rescue Group announces that they will provide shelter to disabled dogs found at the facility.

== Cast ==
=== Animals ===
The film features the voices of

- Roshan Mathew as Tomy, a Golden Retriever
- Raveena Ravi as Amalu, a Cocker Spaniel
- Soubin Shahir as Haridas / Karidas, an Indian pariah
- Sunny Wayne as Bruno, a Rottweiler
- Naslen as Tippu, an American Staffordshire Terrier
- Saiju Kurup as Blacky, a Dobermann
- Indrans as an old Labrador
- Aju Varghese as Poovan, a Rooster
- Ranjini Haridas as Margaret, an Afghan Hound
- Surabhi Lakshmi as mother dog, a Podenco Canario

=== Humans ===
- Rohini as Sumathi
- Vijay Babu as Roy
- Mahima Nambiar as Saraswati, Swamy's daughter
- Suresh Babu Naidu as Narendradas Karanavar
- Srikant Murali as Swamy
- Akshay Radhakrishnan as Bhasi
- Dev Mohan as Anand, Saraswati's fiancé
- Sanju Sanichen as Roshan
- Raghu Subhash as Shafi
- Major Ravi as Major Santhosh Raj (cameo appearance)

== Production ==
=== Development ===
The project was first announced by the makers in July 2020.

=== Filming ===
The principal photography began around September 2020, during the COVID-19 pandemic, and wrapped up on 23 December 2020.

== Soundtrack ==
Valatty

Soundtrack album by Varun Sunil
- Released: 2023
- Genre: Feature film soundtrack
- Length: 13:43
- Languages: Malayalam, English
- Label: Friday Music Company

Varun Sunil chronology
| Haya (2022) | Valatty (2023) |

The music was composed by Varun Sunil.

Track listing
| No. | Title | Lyrics | Singer(s) | Length |
|---|---|---|---|---|
| 1. | "Shwanare" | Vinayak Sasikumar | Crishna | 3:41 |
| 2. | "Friendship Song" | Manu Manjith | Varun Sunil, Maria Mathew Kolady | 3:20 |
| 3. | "The Chase" | Varun Sunil | Varun Sunil | 2:29 |
| 4. | "Arike Koottay Arike" | BK Harinarayanan | Ayraan, Shweta Mohan | 4:13 |
| Total length: | | | | 13:43 |

== Release ==
=== Theatrical ===
Initially, the film was planned to be released on 5 May 2023, but later, it was postponed to 14 July 2023. It was again postponed by a week and was released in theatres on 21 July 2023. KRG Studios acquired the worldwide theatrical release rights of the film. The Kannada, Tamil, Telugu, and Hindi versions were released on 28 July 2023.

The Russian dubbed version of the film was released on 25 April 2024, titled A Dog's Escape in Russian. The film was distributed by Capella Films in Theatres.

=== Home media ===
Disney+ Hotstar has acquired the digital rights and began streaming it on 7 November 2023.

== Reception ==
=== Critical response ===
Anna Mathews of The Times of India gave 3.5 out of 5 stars and wrote, "Valatty is a fun movie for the family to watch together and have a light laugh". Sanjith Sidhardhan of OTTPlay gave 2.5 out of 5 stars and wrote, "Strapped with a predictable tale, Valatty gets caught between being a feel-good movie and a serious take on human cruelty on animals. This only serves it to bog down the dog tale".

Anandu Suresh of The Indian Express gave 2 out of 5 stars and wrote, "In short, Valatty is bound to entertain those seeking a lighthearted movie, but its lasting impact on viewers' hearts is uncertain and will solely hinge on their fondness for dogs". Nirmal Jovial of The Week gave 2 out of 5 stars and wrote, "As a viewer, Valatty personally left this writer feeling disappointed. Nevertheless, it must be acknowledged that it was a one-of-a-kind experiment in Malayalam cinema".
