= Uriyadi =

2016 Indian film by Vijay Kumar

- Theatrical release poster
- Directed by: Vijay Kumar
- Written by: Vijay Kumar
- Produced by: Vijay Kumar; Nalan Kumarasamy; Sameer Bharat Ram; Satish Swaminathan
- Starring: Vijay Kumar; Mime Gopi; Citizen Sivakumar; Chandra Kumar; Henna Bella; Jeyakanth Velu; Suruli
- Narrated by: Arvind Swamy
- Cinematography: Paul Livingstone
- Edited by: Abhinav Sunder Nayak
- Music by: Score: Vijay Kumar; Songs: Masala Coffee; Anthony Daasan; Vishal Chandrashekhar
- Production companies: Souvenir Productions; Pinrom Pictures; Ashok Manor Entertainment; Filmorama
- Distributed by: Pinrom Pictures
- Release date: 27 May 2016
- Running time: 100 minutes
- Country: India
- Language: Tamil

Uriyadi (transl. Breaking Point) is a 2016 Indian Tamil-language political action thriller film written, directed, and produced by filmmaker Vijay Kumar under Souvenir Productions in association with Nalan Kumarasamy and Sameer Bharat Ram, presented and co-produced by Satish Swaminathan. Starring Indian actors Vijay Kumar, Mime Gopi, Citizen Sivakumar, Chandru Kumar, Henna Bella, Jeyakanth Velu, and Suruli, its plot revolves around four bachelors whose carefree lives take a drastic turn when a corrupt official ensnares them in caste politics.

Vijay Kumar wrote the script when he moved to the United States in early 2011, originally titled as Vidiyum Varai Vinmeengalaavom; however, the scripting process was delayed for more than a year due to Kumar's decision to create a storyboard to aid in its organization. After brief work in scripting, casting and pre-production, the film began principal photography in July 2013 and ended in October 2013. Most of the film's portions were shot in and around Chennai; it was followed by a lengthy post-production phase induced by censorship laws that forced Kumar to make a multitude of cuts and revisions before the final edit could be approved for release. Paul Livingstone handled the cinematography for the film, while editing was done by Abhinav Sunder Nayak. In addition to directing and acting in the film, Kumar also composed its score and oversaw its audio engineering. The film features a soundtrack album composed by Masala Coffee, Anthony Daasan and Vishal Chandrashekhar.

Uriyadi was released theatrically on 27 May 2016, to highly positive critical reviews, praising its screenwriting, direction, performances, action sequences, and various technical aspects. Critics praised Vijay Kumar for his realistic filmmaking devoid of clichéd elements present in mainstream Tamil films. Lauded as one of the best political thrillers in Tamil cinema, Uriyadi earned Vijay Kumar his breakthrough in the film industry, granting him many accolades for his work.

A spiritual sequel titled Uriyadi 2 was released on 5 April 2019.

== Plot ==
1995: Lenin Vijay, Suresh, Akhil and Karthi, were four carefree and adventurous friends who are final year students at an engineering college on the outskirts of Trichy. The film opens by showcasing the daily lives of the four student friends. The students soon meet the politician, Kumar, who is eager to begin his own caste-based political party. He also runs a roadside dhaba frequently visited by the students.

In many subsequent events, the students get into trouble with the local residents. In one such instance in the dhaba, Kumar comes to their rescue, and hence, they get in touch with each other. Later that night, however, one of the students is attacked by some of the local residents. This infuriates some other students, who then chase the locals, and a fight ensues.

Meanwhile, Lenin's ex-girlfriend Agnes is harassed by Ramanathan, a part-time engineering student. This is witnessed by Karthi, who confronts and physically assaults Ramanathan and then narrates these events to Lenin. Later, to their surprise, Ramanathan's friends wait in the dhaba to ambush Karthi. Ramanathan, who has little luck with love, yearns for one college student who seems to be the ex-girlfriend of Lenin. One night, the four friends get very drunk and accidentally annoy some of the caste fanatics. Kumar, along with his uncle, happens to see this and contemplates how to take advantage of this tense situation.

While all this is happening, Kumar drafts plans to initiate a caste-based political party about which he has been dreaming. The plot ends when all three sets of characters meet, and each of them discovers their mutual interconnections.

== Cast ==
- Vijay Kumar as Lenin Vijay
- Mime Gopi as Kumar
- Citizen Sivakumar as Ulagappan
- Henna Bella as Agnes
- Chandru Kumar as Suresh
- Jeyakanth Velu as Akhil
- Suruli as Ramanathan
- Shankarthas as Nallathambi

== Production ==
Vijay Kumar, a software engineer-turned-filmmaker, worked on two short films which were screened at the reality show Naalaya Iyakkunar in 2009. But, he discontinued the progress of the films for personal reasons. When he moved to the United States the following year, Kumar began working on the script of his maiden feature film which served the title Vidiyum Varai Vinmeengalaavom (transl. We will be stars until dawn). The scripting and writing process took more than a year, with Kumar sketching more than 2500 shots for its storyboard. As a debutante, he wanted to ensure that everything goes per plan once the film goes on floors and hence created story boards to make production easier, it eventually took him more than four months to complete the process and he wanted to include minute details in the process. After completing the final draft in its entirety, he moved to India and started his production house Souvenir Productions in April 2013.

I believe in staying true to my craft and, at the same time, have some derived message for the society. Since I was making a film that is targeted at all centres, I was open to changing the title. And, Uriyadi, which is about being blindfolded and hitting the target, also reflects the film's second half

— Vijay Kumar, about the title change to Uriyadi, in an interview with The Times of India.

Kumar sent auditions for the film's casting in May 2013, where he prioritised struggling actors who wanted to enter into the film industry after multiple struggles. As a result, a three-month acting workshop was conducted, and he had hired the actors: Chandru Kumar, Henna Bella, Jeyakanth Velu and Suruli. Prominent actors Mime Gopi and Citizen Sivakumar, were also brought in the film. Except for a handful of technicians and actors, the entire crew and cast were debutants. The story was set in a college that is on a highway, which revolves around two sets of characters – the four college students (the protagonists of the film) and a village-based aspiring politician. The story revolves around the seemingly unrelated tracks that merge forms the plot. In addition, the director revealed that there is a third track – a revenge-based conflict between the leads and a part-time student in the college. Kumar later changed the title to Uriyadi (transl. Breaking pot) as he wanted to make it sound audience-friendly.

The principal shooting for the film began in July 2013, once the team had completed pre-production works. 90% of the film's portions were shot in the outskirts of Chennai, in and around places like Padappai and Oragadam. Talking about the challenges he faced while shooting for the film, Vijay Kumar says since the film is set in the 1990s, removing objects relevant to the present time was the toughest challenge of all, mainly because it was mostly shot on the highways. Vijay Kumar made the cinematographer Paul Livingstone, use a film camera and rolls instead of a digital camera, in order to have a realistic portrayal of that period. Kumar was devoid of run-of-the mill characterisations and scenes, and other commercial elements such as glamour, romance and comedy elements which did not synchronise with the main plot. He managed to shoot the action sequences as realistic as possible, where many scenes in the film where the actors hit each other are real, and there were instances of a few getting injured.

== Music ==
The film's soundtrack album featured six tunes: three tracks, three karaoke versions and an unplugged version of one of the songs. The band Masala Coffee contributed two songs to the film's soundtrack, thus making their debut in film music scene. Playback singer Anthony Daasan, also debuted as composer with the film, had tuned one track to the album, which was titled "Maane Maane". The unplugged version of the track "Maane Maane", performed by Siddharth was co-tuned by Vishal Chandrashekhar, which was used for promotional purposes. Vijay Kumar composed the background score for the film, besides acting and direction. The album was released by Sony Music India on 28 January 2016.

== Themes and analysis ==
=== Portrayal of violence ===
Many reviews of the film highlight the intense violence portrayed throughout. In an interview with the Indo-Asian News Service, Vijay Kumar relates how actors were actually injured during filming: "I was supposed to hit someone in the back with a rod, and somehow the blow landed on his head, much to my surprise. Although we used a fiber rod, he suffered severe injury." A reviewer writing in Indiaglitz cautions, "even after being warned the violence in the film is excessive and causes the viewers to flinch and squirm." A critic writing in The Hindu noted the level of realism in the fight scenes, "here you see the chaos, you see people scrambling, slipping, falling — not people executing perfect punches.". Another critic from The Times of India wrote "High on blood, violence and realism this film will definitely shock and appal you. The realistic fights were more brutal than entertaining".

=== Political significance ===
Some critics note the film's commentary on caste-based political parties. Writing in The Hindu, Baradwaj Rangan notes that director Vijay Kumar illustrates "how these small outfits form a party whose mission is (apparently) to represent that particular caste, get votes from people belonging to that caste, get elected to power, and trade this power for favours from bigger parties." A reviewer in Ananda Vikatan, called Uriyadi a whiplash against caste. Indiaglitz was all praise for the way Vijay Kumar handled caste based politics in the movie, "At such a young age it is surprising that this man has a deep understanding and conviction about the caste based politics and how the self proclaimed champions of a caste betray their own people for selfish motives". Puthiya Thalaimurai noted that Uriyadi shed light on the selfish political ambitions of caste outfit leaders. Remarkably, after a screening of Uriyadi at the Institute of Politics of University of Wrocław, Poland, its official representatives issued a statement saying it educated their students on the Indian caste system and its political consequences and that it enabled them to observe various ways of creating political influence. TNMEKS noted that Uriyadi unmasked the cruel nature of caste and shed light on the way caste outfits plot extensively to transform themselves into political parties.

== Release ==
By the completion of post-production works within August 2014, Vijay Kumar sent the film to the Central Board of Film Certification for preview screening. After trimming scenes featuring excessive violence, the film got an A certificate from the Censor Board. Kumar approached distributors to release the film, who refused the film in concern of a violent content. In mid-2015, director Nalan Kumarasamy, whom Kumar befriended when they were contestants in the reality show Naalaya Iyakkunar, had agreed to distribute and co-produce the film, under his newly launched production house Pinrom Pictures. Kumar organised a preview show for the members of the Tamil film industry on 23 May 2016, where it received highly positive critical response. The film was theatrically released on 27 May 2016.

Prior to the release, the film was pirated by torrent sites which affected its theatrical run. However, it also helped the film gain more popularity and response among the audience, who praised filmmaker Vijay for the direction. The fans requested to release the uncut version of the film, but Vijay Kumar revealed that the uncensored footage of the film was destroyed during the 2015 South Indian floods, which flooded his office in Jafferkhanpet, but the team had a copy of the censored and edited version of the film at Prasad Labs, where the director had to reassemble his cut from the copy. Uriyadi, along with 12 other Tamil films, was screened at the Tamil film competition of the 14th Chennai International Film Festival 2016.

== Reception ==
=== Critical response ===
Uriyadi received critical acclaim from critics praising Vijaykumar for the scripting, direction, performances and his intention of being devoid of the commercial elements used in mainstream films. M. Suganth, editor-in-chief, for The Times of India gave the film 4 (out of 5) stars, stating that Uriyadi "displays a daring that belies its small-budget, first-film credentials, and stakes its claim in the list of the best films of the year." Baradwaj Rangan, an Indian film critic and writer for The Hindu, stated that "Vijay Kumar doesn't need a condescending pat on the back. He's a solid filmmaker, and he's made a gritty little film." Behindwoods gave the film 2.75 out of five stars saying "Brutally brutal in all the right ways". Sify gave three out of five stars for the film and stated it as a "well made revenge thriller by a young team and they have conveyed a relevant message on caste base politics with realistic treatment". Indiaglitz also reviewed the film, describing it as a "gripping saga of extreme violence". In contrast, Gautaman Bhaskaran from Hindustan Times rated one out of five stars, calling it as "A socially debase story on caste-based politics."

The daily newspaper Dinamalar reviewed Uriyadi and wrote it has a very gripping storyline and screenplay, that is entirely new to Tamil cinema. Ananda Vikatan reviewed Uriyadi, calling it a trendsetter for the current film industry and saying it is executed in a very appreciable way. In another review of theirs, a reviewer wrote that Uriyadi is handled very different from other caste based movies, and the climax is unique and interesting. Vijay Kumar was appreciated for handling direction, production, acting and background scores all by himself and executing them neatly.

However, Uriyadi was listed in the Hindustan Times' top 10 southern films of 2016 and praised the director Vijay Kumar for his solid directorial debut.

=== Awards and nominations ===
Award	Date of ceremony (Note: Date is linked to the article about the awards held that year, wherever possible.)	Category	Recipient(s) and nominee(s)	Result	Ref.
Ananda Vikatan Cinema Awards	7 January 2016	Best Debut Actor	Vijay Kumar	Won	
Behindwoods Gold Medals	14 June 2017	Best Stunt Choreographer	Vicky	Won	
Behindwoods Gold Medals	14 June 2017	Wall of Fame – Direction	Vijay Kumar	Won	
Filmibeat Tamil Cinema Awards	13 January 2017	Best Debut Director	Vijay Kumar	Won	
Norway Tamil Film Festival Awards	27–30 April 2017	Best Production	Uriyadi	Won	
Radio Mirchi Madurai Awards	13 May 2017	Best Director	Vijay Kumar	Won	
South Indian International Movie Awards	30 June–1 July 2017	Best Debut Director – Tamil	Vijay Kumar	Nominated	
South Indian International Movie Awards	30 June–1 July 2017	Best Debut Actor – Tamil	Vijay Kumar	Nominated	
Tamil Nadu Murpoku Ezhuthalar Kalaignargal Sangam Film Awards	1 September 2017	Special Award for Story, Screenplay and Direction	Vijay Kumar	Won	
Tamil Nadu Murpoku Ezhuthalar Kalaignargal Sangam Film Awards	1 September 2017	Special Award for Production	Uriyadi	Won	
Tentokotta Awards	28 April 2017	Most Watched Film of a Debutant Filmmaker	Uriyadi	Won	

=== Film charts ===
In addition to the accolades received, the film was listed in many critics' top ten lists, and was listed in the "Best Tamil (and South Indian) films of 2016" by many noted publications and news outlets. Vijay Kumar led Yahoo News' list of Southern directors who impressed in 2016, for his work in the film.

- 1st – Behindwoods (shared with Ammani)
- 1st – iFlicks
- 1st (Top 5) – StudioFlicks
- 2nd – Anupama Subramanian, Deccan Chronicle
- 3rd – M. Suganth, The Times of India
- 4th – Gulf News
- 5th – Baradwaj Rangan, The Hindu
- 6th – India Today
- 6th – Hindustan Times

== Sequel ==
Vijay Kumar started penning the next film, which was considered to be the spiritual sequel of this film. The film titled Uriyadi 2 was produced by Suriya's 2D Entertainment and was officially announced on 21 September 2018. Filmed within 36 days, Uriyadi 2, had a different technical crew unlike the first film, with newcomer Vismaya as the female lead, and Govind Vasantha scoring music for this film. The film released theatrically on 5 April 2019.

== Legacy ==
The director of the movie, Vijay Kumar also had a session with BOFTA direction students on how he went about doing his independent film and succeeded. Talking about the movie, after the interaction session, Director Cheran said he looks at Uriyadi as the contribution of Tamil cinema toward positive societal change and lauded Vijay Kumar for taking up such a powerful issue in his debut venture. Director Ram noted that Uriyadi is an original film, and appreciated the courage of the director for treating a sensitive issue as the core content of the movie. Also several other directors appreciated Uriyadi and Vijay Kumar during the meeting.

Uriyadi has cemented its status as one of the most revered and celebrated movies among people. It was one of the most talked film in Tamil cinema, even after a year of its release. Veteran director Bharathiraja while speaking at an event, praised Uriyadi and expressed his amazement saying "It is a beautiful film, made fantastically without any absurdity". Uriyadi also transcended cultural borders when it was screened at the Institute of Politics of the University of Wrocław in Poland and created an awareness about the Indian caste system among its students. The official representatives of the university also commended Vijay Kumar for handling a difficult subject in the movie, its realism and its unique way of narration. The film gained popularity for the use of Bharathiyar's song "Agnikunjondru" and the theme composed in this film, was reused in the spiritual successor, Uriyadi 2 (also directed by Kumar).
