= Vijay Kumar (director) =

Indian actor, writer, director, lyricist and producer

- Born: Chennai, Tamil Nadu, India
- Education: Government College of Engineering, Salem
- Occupations: Film director; Actor; Screenwriter; Film Producer
- Years active: 2013 - present

Vijay Kumar is an Indian actor, writer, director, lyricist and producer. His directorial debut, Uriyadi, a political thriller set in the 1990s, was released in 2016 and was lauded as one of the best political thrillers in Tamil cinema. His second project Uriyadi 2 released in April 2019.

== Early life ==
Vijay was born in Chennai where he spent his schooling years. He then studied Metallurgical Engineering at the Government College of Engineering, Salem. A software engineer by profession, he quit his career in reputed companies like IBM and Infosys to pursue his passion in cinema.

== Film career ==
Vijay was a Project Lead in IBM when he quit his job to pursue his passion in filmmaking. He made a short film and applied to the first season of the Nalaya Iyakunar show in 2009. He was selected and subsequently screened two short films on the show. However, he left for personal reasons.

He moved to the United States in 2010 and began writing the script for Uriyadi in early 2011. It was initially titled Vidiyum Varai VinmeengalaaVom (V4). He spent over a year on the script, sketching more than 2500 shots for its storyboard.

Back in India, Vijay Kumar started his production house Souvenir Productions in April 2013. He conducted a three-month acting workshop for the actors as almost all of them were debutants.

Uriyadi was released in theaters on 27 May 2016. Upon its release, The Hindu had a chat with Vijay and cited that Uriyadi is "A throwback to the 90s". Uriyadi 2, produced by Suriya's 2D Entertainment, directed by and starring Vijay Kumar released on 5 April 2019.

Vijay Kumar's next film was Fight Club, a youth action-drama that went on floors on 16 July 2021. It stars Vijay Kumar and Monisha Menon in the lead and is produced by Reel Good Films. The principal photography was completed on 3 July 2022. Presented by Lokesh Kanagaraj's production company, G Squad, the film released on 15 December 2023 to favorable reviews.

Vijay Kumar will also play the lead in Reel Good Films second production, Election. The film, directed by Thamizh, co-stars Preethi Asrani. It also features Pavel Navageethan, George Maryan and Dileepan, with music by Govind Vasantha. The principal photography wrapped up on 4 September 2022 and the film will release on 17 May 2024. Vijay Kumar has also written the dialogues of the film.

== Filmography ==
Year	Film	Credited as					Role	Notes
Year	Film	Writer	Director	Actor	Producer	Background Music	Role	Notes
2016	Uriyadi	✓	✓	✓	✓	✓	Lenin Vijay	
2019	Uriyadi 2	✓	✓	✓	✗	✗	Lenin Vijay	
2020	Soorarai Pottru	Dialogues	✗	✗	✗	✗	—	
2023	Fight Club	Dialogues	✗	✓	Creative Producer	✗	Selvaa	
2024	Election	Dialogues	✗	✓	Creative Producer	✗	Nadarajan	

== Awards and nominations ==
Year	Film	Award	Category	Notes	Ref
2016	Uriyadi	Ananda Vikatan Cinema Awards	Best Debut Actor	Won	
2017	Uriyadi	SIIMA	Best Debut Actor	Nominated	
2017	Uriyadi	Tentkotta Awards	Most Watched film of a Debutant Filmmaker	Won	
2017	Uriyadi	Norway Tamil Film Festival Awards	Best Production	Won	
2017	Uriyadi	Tamil Nadu Murpoku Ezhuthalar Kalaingargal Sangam Film Awards	Special Award for Production	Won	
2017	Uriyadi	Tamil Nadu Murpoku Ezhuthalar Kalaingargal Sangam Film Awards	Special Award for Writing and Direction	Won	
2017	Uriyadi	Radio Mirchi Madurai Awards	Best Director	Won	
2017	Uriyadi	SIIMA	Best Debut Director	Nominated	
2017	Uriyadi	Filmibeat Tamil Cinema Award	Best Debut Director	Won	
2017	Uriyadi	Behindwoods Gold Medals	Direction	Wall of Fame	
