= G. Balakrishnan =

Indian journalist and editorial cartoonist

G. Balakrishnan, G. Bala or Bala, is an independent editorial cartoonist and journalist from Tamil Nadu, India. He is the editor of the digital media platform LinesMedia. Before going independent, he was a cartoonist and journalist for Tamil weekly Kumudam for 12 years. He is known for his criticism of state and centre politicians and governments.

== Arrests over cartoons ==
He came to national attention when he was arrested for his cartoon criticizing the Chief Minister, Nellai Collector and the Commissioner for failing to prevent the death by self immolation of the Isakkimuthu family due to pressure from money-lenders. His arrest was criticized by journalists and civic groups, while justified by ruling AIADMK government and BJP leaders supported the arrest.
