= Sila Nodigalil =

- Poster
- Directed by: Vinay Bharadwaj
- Written by: Vinay Bharadwaj
- Produced by: Punnagai Poo Gheetha; Sharmiela Mandre
- Starring: Richard Rishi; Punnagai Poo Gheetha; Yashika Aannand
- Cinematography: Abhimanyu Sadanandan
- Edited by: Shaijal P V
- Music by: Masala Coffee; Bjorn Surrao; Darshana KT; Staccato; Rohit Matt
- Production company: Esquire Productions
- Release date: 24 November 2023
- Country: India
- Language: Tamil

Sila Nodigalil (transl. Within a few seconds) is a 2023 Indian Tamil-language mystery thriller drama film directed by Vinay Bharadwaj. The film stars Richard Rishi, Punnagai Poo Gheetha and Yashika Aannand in the lead roles. The film was produced by Punnagai Poo Gheetha under the banner of Esquire Productions and Sharmiela Mandre is the creative producer.

== Cast ==
- Richard Rishi as Raj
- Punnagai Poo Gheetha as Medha
- Yashika Aannand as Maya Pillai
- Lydia Danistan as Revati
- Bitu Thomas as Riddhima
- Isha Raj as Zara
- Antara Banerjee as Shreya
- Rose Adams as Haley
- Penukonda as Maid
- Shipra Jain Khanna as Radha
- Darren as Phillip
- Anna as Phillip's girlfriend
- David Broughton as Dr. Stevens

== Production ==
After the debut film Mundina Nildana, Vinay Bharadwaj described this film as his Tamil debut project, titled Sila Nodigalil. The film was prominently shot in London. The film was produced by Punnagai Poo Gheetha under the banner of Esquire Productions. The cinematography was done by Abhimanyu Sadanandan, while editing was handled by Shaijal P V.

== Soundtrack ==
The soundtrack has five songs, each composed by a different music director: Masala Coffee, Bjorn Surrao, Darshana KT, Staccato and Rohit Matt.

Track listing
No.	Title	Lyrics	Music	Singer(s)	Length
1.	"Fun Maaro"	Ku Karthik	Masala Coffee	Varun Sunil	3:03
2.	"Aasai Mugam"	Subramania Bharati	Staccato	Niranjana Ramanan	3:00
3.	"Tholai Vaanam"	C. M. Lokesh	Darshana K. T.	Darshana KT	2:57
4.	"Pattasu Poove"	Vignesh Ramakrishna	Bjorn Surrao	Bjorn Surrao	3:01
5.	"En Nenjil"	P. S. Jayahari	Rohit Matt	Rohit Matt	2:52
Total length:					14:53

== Release and reception ==
The film was released on 24 November 2023 in theatres. A critic from Zoom rated three out of five and stated that "Vinay Bharadwaj's direction, coupled with stellar performances, captivating cinematography, and a resonating musical score, collaboratively weaves a tale that keeps the audience on the edge of their seats, making Sila Nodigalil a standout cinematic experience." A critic from Maalai Malar criticised the screenplay, but praised the cinematography and editing.
