= Mundina Nildana =

- Directed by: Vinay Bharadwaj
- Screenplay by: Vinay Bharadwaj
- Starring: Praveen Tej; Radhika Chetan; Ananya Kashyap; Ajay Raj; Dattanna
- Cinematography: Abhimanyu Sadanandan
- Edited by: Srikanth
- Music by: Srinidhi Venkatesh; Masala Coffee Band; Vasuki Vaibhav; Adil Nadaf; Swarathma Band; Jim Satya; Kaushik Shukla
- Production company: Coastal Breeze Productions
- Distributed by: KRG Studios
- Release date: 29 November 2019
- Country: India
- Language: Kannada

Mundina Nildana is a 2019 Indian Kannada-language film written and directed by Vinay Bharadwaj, and produced by Coastal Breeze Productions. The film stars Praveen Tej, Radhika Chetan and Ananya Kashyap in lead roles.

The posters are designed by the 'Rudra Hanuman' fame painter Karan Acharya. The sound design is done by award-winning Ajay Kumar PB (Badlapur, Andhadhun fame). While the movie has seven songs composed by seven different music directors, the background score is done by Jim Satya who has worked on notable movies like Barfi, Yeh Jawani Hai Deewani. The coloring of the film is done by colorist Siddhartha Gandhi from Shah Rukh Khan's Red Chillies. Dialogues are written by Abhishek Iyengar. The movie's VFX is done by Pixel Digital Studios who has worked on notable movies like Baahubali and Gully Boy.

== Plot ==
Partha, Meera, and Ahana who are completely different from each other have set out on a liberating journey that is taking them to their next destination. All three characters have diverging personalities and different goals that they are chasing after.

Partha is endeavoring in a corporate environment trying to break free from it, as his real passion is photography. Ahana is an ambitious medical student who is a fun-loving millennial who does not believe in commitments. Meera is an art curator and a self-sufficient woman who is looking for a soul mate.

In this process of discovering relationships, love, friendship, passion, and career, they take you through a fun-filled journey.

== Cast ==
- Praveen Tej as Partha Srivastav
- Radhika Chetan as Meera Sharma
- Ananya Kashyap. as Ahana Kashyap
- Ajay Raj as Ekalavya
- Dattanna as Kris
- Shankar Ashwath as Partha's Dad
- Diksha Sharma as Zoya
- Vinay Bharadwaj as himself
- Kshama Santosh Rai as Dr Sakshi
- Siddharth Bhat as Traffic Police

== Soundtrack ==
The album has seven songs composed by seven different music directors.

Track listing
No.	Title	Lyrics	Music	Singer(s)	Length
1.	"Life of Partha"	Srinidhi Venkatesh	Srinidhi Venkatesh	Srinidhi Venkatesh, Kumaran Shivamani	3.00
2.	"Manase Maya"	Kiran Kaverappa	Masala Coffee Band	Sooraj Santhosh, Varun Sunil	3:14
3.	"Innunu Bekagide"	Pramod Maravanthe	Vasuki Vaibhav	Vasuki Vaibhav	3.26
4.	"Where's your Mundina Nildana"	Vasuki Vaibhav	Adil Nadaf	Madhuri Sheshadri, Chetan Gandharwa	2.56
5.	"Hrudaya (Male Version)"	Skanda S	Swarathma Band	Vasu Dixit	2.47
6.	"Hrudaya (Female Version)"	Skanda S	Swarathma	Inchara Rao	2.54
7.	"Naguva Kalisu"	Kiran Kaverappa	Jim Satya	Ananya Bhat, Narayan Sharma	3.33
8.	"Life Is Beautiful"	Kiran Kaverappa	Kaushik Shukla	Sanjith Hegde	2.54
Total length:					23:24

== Production ==
Produced by Coastal Breeze Productions, the movie's shoot began in January 2019 and ended in April. The shoot was done in Bangalore, Sakleshpur, Kolar, Himachal Pradesh and Netherlands. The post-production was done in Bangalore, Mumbai, and Chennai.

== Release ==
The movie was released on the 29 November 2019. Dialogues are written by Abhishek Iyengar. The movie's VFX is done by Pixel Digital Studios who has worked on notable movies like Baahubali and Gully Boy.

== Awards and nominations ==
Award	Category	Recipient	Result	Ref
9th South Indian International Movie Awards	Best Actress	Radhika Chetan	Nominated	
9th South Indian International Movie Awards	Best Supporting Actor	Ajay Raj	Nominated	
9th South Indian International Movie Awards	Best Debut Actress	Ananya Kashyap	Won	
9th South Indian International Movie Awards	Best Debut Director	Vinay Bharadwaj	Nominated	
9th South Indian International Movie Awards	Best Debut Producer	Coastal Breeze Productions	Won	
9th South Indian International Movie Awards	Best Male Playback Singer	Vasuki Vaibhav for "Innunu Bekagide"	Nominated	
9th South Indian International Movie Awards	Best Cinematographer	Abhimanyu Sadanandan	Nominated	
