= Kudlu =

- Census Town
- Location in Kerala, India
- Coordinates: 12.525972°N 74.9686968°E
- Country: India
- State: Kerala
- District: Kasaragod

Area
  - Total: 10.87 km^{2} (4.20 sq mi)

Population (2011)
  - Total: 26,235
  - Density: 2,414/km^{2} (6,251/sq mi)

Languages
  - Official: Malayalam, English
- Time zone: UTC+5:30 (IST)
- Vehicle registration: KL-14

Kudlu is a census town in the Kasaragod district, state of Kerala, India. Kudlu is a suburb of Kasaragod city.

== Demographics ==
As of 2011 Census, Kudlu had a population of 26,235. Males constitute 48% of the population and females 52%. Kudlu census town has an area of 10.48 km^{2} (4.05 sq mi) with 5,545 families residing in it. Kudlu had an average literacy rate of 94%, higher than the national average of 74.04%: male literacy was 96.6%, and female literacy was 91.6%. 12% of the population was under 6 years of age.
