= Oneindia =

Indian online news portal

OneIndia
- Company type: Private
- Website type: News portal
- Available in: English, Hindi, Kannada, Telugu, Tamil, Malayalam, Bengali, and Gujarati
- Founded: 1 January 2006 (20 years ago)
- Headquarters: Bengaluru, Karnataka, India
- Country of origin: India
- Owner: Greynium Information Technologies Pvt. Ltd.
- Industry: Internet services, Digital media
- Employees: 400+
- Website: www.oneindia.com

Oneindia.com is an Indian news website established in January 2006 by BG Mahesh. The website provides news updates, information on sports, events, travel, entertainment, business, lifestyle, videos, and classifieds in seven different Indian languages and English. In June 2021, its Alexa ranking in India is 134. It is owned by Greynium Information Technologies Pvt Ltd.

It is available in Kannada, Hindi, Telugu, Tamil, Bengali, Gujarati, and Malayalam.

== History ==
OneIndia rebranded in 2024 with the launch of its new logo.
