= List of Tamil films of 2022 =

This is a list of Tamil language films produced in the Tamil cinema in India that were released in 2022.

== Box office collection ==
The list of highest-grossing Tamil films released in 2022, by worldwide box office gross revenue

#	Implies that the film is multilingual and the gross collection figure includes the worldwide collection of the other simultaneously filmed version.

*	Denotes films still running in cinemas worldwide

Rank	Title	Production company	Worldwide gross	
1	Ponniyin Selvan: I	Lyca Productions	₹510-530 crore	(Note: Ponniyin Selvan: I's reported worldwide gross is ₹500 crore according to Hindustan Times, Outlook India, News18, and The Economic Times.)
2	Vikram	Raaj Kamal Films International	₹435–450 crore	
3	Beast	Sun Pictures	₹217–300 crore	
4	Valimai	Zee Studios Bayview Projects	₹130–152 crore	
5	Sardar	Prince Pictures	₹110 crore	
6	Love Today	AGS Entertainment Red Giant Movies	₹105 crore	
7	Don	Lyca Productions	₹102 crore	
8	Thiruchitrambalam	Sun Pictures	₹100 crore	
9	Etharkkum Thunindhavan	Sun Pictures	₹80-85 crore	
10	Vendhu Thanindhathu Kaadu	Vels Film International	₹80 crore	

== Released films ==
=== January – March ===
Opening		Title	Director	Cast	Production
J A N	7	Adangamai	R. Gopal	Sharon, Priya, Yagave	Vores Pictures
J A N	7	Anbarivu	Aswin Raam	Hiphop Tamizha, Kashmira Pardeshi, Shivani Rajashekar	Sathya Jyothi Films
J A N	7	Idarinum Thalarinum	Raghava Harikesava	Raghava Harikesava, Ramana, Radharavi	Jingle Bells Films International
J A N	7	Pen Vilai Verum 999 Rubai Mattume	Varada Raj	Rajkamal, Swetha Pandit, Vadivel Balaji	Rainbow Productions
J A N	13	Carbon	R. Srinuvasan	Vidharth, Dhanya Balakrishna	Benchmark Films
J A N	13	Enna Solla Pogirai	A. Hariharan	Ashwin Kumar, Teju Ashwini, Avantika Mishra	Trident Arts
J A N	13	Kombu Vatcha Singamda	S. R. Prabhakaran	M. Sasikumar, Madonna Sebastian, Soori	Redhan The Cinema People
J A N	13	Naai Sekar	Kishore Rajkumar	Sathish, Pavithra Lakshmi, George Maryan	AGS Entertainment
J A N	14	Theal	Harikumar	Prabhu Deva, Samyuktha Hegde, Yogi Babu	Studio Green
J A N	21	AGP Schizophrenia	Ramesh Subramaniyan	Lakshmi Menon, R. V. Bharathan	KSR Studio
J A N	21	Marutha	GRS	Saravanan, Radhika, Viji Chandrasekhar	Bigway Pictures
J A N	21	Mudhal Nee Mudivum Nee	Darbuka Siva	Kishen Das, Meetha Raghunath, Harini Ramesh	Super Talkies
J A N	28	Kondruvidava	K. R. Sreejith	Haneefa, Ramamoorthy, Mahalakshmi	Edit House Movies
J A N	28	Narai Ezhuthum Suyasaritham	K. Manikandan	Delhi Ganesh, K. Manikandan	G&K Vahinee Productions
J A N	28	Sila Nerangalil Sila Manidhargal	Vishal Venkat	Ashok Selvan, Nassar, K. Manikandan	Trident Arts
F E B	4	Arasiyal Sathurangam	Broadway Sundar	Sumangali Sathish, Udaiyar, Ajees	Vishnu Movie Makers
F E B	4	Pandrikku Nandri Solli	Bala Aran	Nishanth, Joe Malloori, Vijay Sathya	Head Media Works
F E B	4	Saayam	Antony Samy	Abi Saravanan, Shiny, Ponvannan	White Lamp Productions
F E B	4	Veeramae Vaagai Soodum	Thu Pa Saravanan	Vishal, Dimple Hayathi, Yogi Babu	Vishal Film Factory
F E B	4	Yaaro	Sandeep Sai	Venkat Reddy, Upasana RC, C. M. Bala	TakeOK Productions
F E B	6	Anbulla Ghilli	Srinath Ramalingam	Maithreya Rajasekar, Dushara Vijayan	Rise East Creations
F E B	10	Mahaan	Karthik Subbaraj	Vikram, Dhruv Vikram, Simran, Bobby Simha	Seven Screen Studio
F E B	11	Astakarmma	Vijay Tamilselvan	C. S. Kishan, Nandini Rai, Shritha Sivadas	Mishri Enterprises
F E B	11	FIR	Manu Anand	Vishnu Vishal, Gautham Vasudev Menon, Reba Monica John	Vishnu Vishal Studioz
F E B	11	Kadaisi Vivasayi	M. Manikandan	Nallandi, Vijay Sethupathi, Yogi Babu	Tribal Arts Production
F E B	11	Koorman	Bryan B. George	Rajaji, Janani, Bala Saravanan	MK Entertainment
F E B	11	Vidiyadha Iravondru Vendum	Karuppaiyaa Murugan	Ashok Kumar, Hrithika Srinivas	Battlers Cinema
F E B	17	Veerapandiyapuram	Suseenthiran	Jai, Meenakshi Govindarajan, Akanksha Singh	Lendi Studio
F E B	24	Valimai	H. Vinoth	Ajith Kumar, Huma Qureshi, Kartikeya Gummakonda	Bayview Projects LLP
M A R	3	Hey Sinamika	Brinda	Dulquer Salmaan, Kajal Aggarwal, Aditi Rao Hydari	Jio Studios & Viacom18 Studios
M A R	10	Etharkkum Thunindhavan	Pandiraj	Suriya, Priyanka Mohan, Vinay Rai	Sun Pictures
M A R	11	Clap	Prithivi Adithya	Aadhi Pinisetty, Aakanksha Singh, Nassar, Prakash Raj	Big Print Pictures
M A R	11	Maaran	Karthick Naren	Dhanush, Malavika Mohanan, Samuthirakani	Sathya Jyothi Films
M A R	18	Kallan	Chandra Thangaraj	Karu Palaniappan, Nikita, Maya Chandran	Etcetera Entertainment
M A R	18	Kuthiraivaal	Manoj-Shyam	Kalaiyarasan, Anjali Patil, Chetan	Neelam Productions
M A R	18	Yutha Satham	Ezhil	R. Parthiban, Gautham Karthik, Saipriya Deva	Kallal Global Entertainment
M A R	25	Achcham Madam Naanam Payirppu	Raja Ramamurthy	Akshara Haasan, Usha Uthup, Anjana Jayaprakash	Trendloud

=== April – June ===
Opening		Title	Director	Cast	Studio	Ref
A P R	1	Idiot	Rambhala	Shiva, Nikki Galrani, Akshara Gowda	Screen Scene Media	
A P R	1	Manmadha Leelai	Venkat Prabhu	Ashok Selvan, Samyuktha Hegde, Smruthi Venkat, Riya Suman	Rockfort Entertainment	
A P R	1	Poo Sandi Varan	JK Wicky	"Mirchi" Ramana, Logan Nathan, Tinesh Sarathi Krishnan	Vellithirai Talkies	
A P R	1	Selfie	Mathimaran Pugazhendhi	G. V. Prakash Kumar, Gautham Vasudev Menon, Varsha Bollamma	DG Film Company	
A P R	8	Taanakkaran	Tamizh	Vikram Prabhu, Anjali Nair, Lal	Potential Studios	
A P R	13	Beast	Nelson	Vijay, Pooja Hegde, Selvaraghavan	Sun Pictures	
A P R	14	Kuttram Kuttrame	Suseenthiran	Jai, Bharathiraja, Dhivya Duraisamy, Harish Uthaman	D Company	
A P R	18	Santharpam	Saravana Sakthi	Ranesh, Ganesh, Parvati Nirban	Red Moon Movies	
A P R	21	Oh My Dog	Sarov Shanmugam	Arun Vijay, Arnav Vijay, Vinay Rai, Mahima Nambiar	2D Entertainment	
A P R	28	Hostel	Sumanth Radhakrishnan	Ashok Selvan, Priya Bhavani Shankar, Sathish	Trident Arts	
A P R	28	Kaathuvaakula Rendu Kaadhal	Vignesh Shivan	Vijay Sethupathi, Nayanthara, Samantha Ruth Prabhu	Rowdy Pictures	
A P R	29	Amaichar	L. Muthukumaraswamy	Jai Akash, Akshaya, Devika, Vijayakumar	Sree Amman Medias	
A P R	29	Divya Meedhu Kadhal	Mathan	Mathan, Nisha Shetty	Brilliant Movies	
A P R	29	Kathir	Dhinesh Palanivel	Venkatesh, Rajini Chandy, Santhosh Prathap, Bhavya Trikha	Dhuvaraga Studios	
A P R	29	Payanigal Gavanikkavum	S. P. Shakthivel	Vidharth, Karunakaran, Lakshmi Priyaa Chandramouli	All In Pictures	
M A Y	6	Akka Kuruvi	Samy	Master Maheen, Baby Daviya, Meenakshi Dinesh	Madurai Muthu Movies	
M A Y	6	Koogle Kuttappa	Sabari–Saravanan	K. S. Ravikumar, Tharshan, Losliya	RK Celluloids	
M A Y	6	Saani Kaayidham	Arun Matheswaran	Keerthy Suresh, Selvaraghavan	Screen Scene Media Entertainment	
M A Y	6	Thunikaram	Baala Sudan	Semmalar Annam, Vinoth Logithasan, Bharani	A4 Media Works	
M A Y	6	Visithiran	M. Padmakumar	R. K. Suresh, Poorna, Madhu Shalini	B Studios	
M A Y	12	Ayngaran	Ravi Arasu	G. V. Prakash Kumar, Mahima Nambiar	Common Man Presents	
M A Y	13	Don	Cibi Chakaravarthi	Sivakarthikeyan, Priyanka Mohan, S. J. Suryah	Lyca Productions	
M A Y	13	Ranga	Vinod DL	Sibi Sathyaraj, Nikhila Vimal, Sathish	Boss Movies	
M A Y	20	Nenjuku Needhi	Arunraja Kamaraj	Udhayanidhi Stalin, Aari Arujunan, Tanya Ravichandran	Bayview Projects	
M A Y	20	Paruva Kadhal	K. Ravi	Kalingarayan, R. Sundarrajan, Bonda Mani	Ram Film Productions	
M A Y	20	Take Diversion	Sivaani Senthil	Sivakumar, Padine Kumar, John Vijay	Sivaani Studios	
M A Y	27	Chota	Siranjeevi	Sanjeevi, Poornima Ravi, Vivek Prasanna	Sri Punniyavathi Ammal Films	
M A Y	27	Grandma	Shijinlal S. S.	Sonia Agarwal, Vimala Raman, Hemanth Menon	GMA Films	
M A Y	27	Patravan	Sikkal Rajesh	Ashwin, Bhuvana, Anu Ragavi	Sathiya Sutha Creations	
M A Y	27	Pothanur Thabal Nilayam	Praveen	Praveen, Anjali Rao, Venkat Sundar	Passion Studios	
M A Y	27	Seththumaan	Thamizh	Manickam, Ashwin Shiva, Prasanna Balachandra	Neelam Productions	
M A Y	27	Uzhaikkum Kaigal	Namakkal MGR	Namakkal MGR, Kiranmai, Jaguar Thangam	K Empire Movies	
M A Y	27	Vaaitha	Mahivarman C. S.	Nassar, Mu Ramaswamy, Pugazh Mahendran	Varaha Swamy Films	
M A Y	27	Vishamakaran	V	V, Anicka Vikhraman, Chaitra Reddy	Honey Frame Works	
J U N	3	Vikram	Lokesh Kanagaraj	Kamal Haasan, Vijay Sethupathi, Fahadh Faasil	Raaj Kamal Films International	
J U N	17	Kapalikaram	Dhakshan Vijay	Dhakshan Vijay, Mime Gopi, Gayathri	Magizh Production	
J U N	17	Kundas	Ra. Ananth	Sha, Archana Gowtham, Rajendran	Rama Nadarajan Films	
J U N	17	O2	G. S. Viknesh	Nayanthara, Rithvik, Barath Neelakantan	Dream Warrior Pictures	
J U N	17	Vanjithinai	B. L. Sasikumar	Sasikumar, Sathish, Annanya	SPS Movies	
J U N	17	Veetla Vishesham	RJ Balaji – N. J. Saravanan	RJ Balaji, Sathyaraj, Urvashi, Aparna Balamurali	BayView Projects LLP	
J U N	24	Maamanithan	Seenu Ramasamy	Vijay Sethupathi, Gayathrie, Guru Somasundaram	YSR Films	
J U N	24	Maayon	Kishore N.	Sibi Sathyaraj, Tanya Ravichandran, Radha Ravi	Double Meaning Production	
J U N	24	Pattampoochi	Badri	Sundar C, Jai, Honey Rose	Avni Tele Media	
J U N	24	Polama Oorkolam	Nagaraj Bai Durailingam	Praboojit, Shakthi Mahendra, Ravi Elumalai	Gajasimma Makers	
J U N	24	Vezham	Sandeep Shyam	Ashok Selvan, Janani, Iswarya Menon	K4 Kreations	

=== July – September ===
Opening		Title	Director	Cast	Studio	Ref
J U L	1	D Block	Vijay Kumar Rajendran	Arulnithi, Avantika Mishra, Karu Palaniappan	MNM Films	
J U L	1	Rocketry: The Nambi Effect (Note: Simultaneously shot in Hindi and contains English dialogues.)	R. Madhavan	R. Madhavan, Simran	Tricolour Films	
J U L	1	Yaanai	Hari	Arun Vijay, Priya Bhavani Shankar, Samuthirakani	Drumsticks Productions	
J U L	4	1945 (Note: Simultaneously shot in Telugu language.)	Sathyasiva	Rana Daggubati, Regina Cassandra, Sathyaraj	K Productions	
J U L	8	Bestie	Ranga	Ashok Kumar, Yashika Aannand, Sathyan	RS Cinema	
J U L	8	Foreign Sarakku	Vigneshwaran	Gopinath, Sundar, Hussain, Afrina	Neptune Sailors Production	
J U L	8	Jananayagam Virpanaikku Alla	A. Jeeva Rathinam	Vels, Siva, Saranya Anand, Vadivukkarasi	Venu Anandhi Films	
J U L	8	Kichi Kichi	Pa. Anantharajan	Azhar, Manishajith, Yogi Babu	RG Media	
J U L	8	Naadhiru Dhinna	Swarna Babu	Sabyasachi Mishra, Radhika Preethi, Raksha Bhavani	Dream Colours	
J U L	8	Otru	Mathivanan Sakthivel	Mathivanan Sakthivel, Mahashri, Indira	SS Sakthi Screens	
J U L	8	Padaippalan	Thian Prabhu	Ramesh, Vicky, Velmurugan, Manobala	Thian Pictures	
J U L	8	Panni Kutty	Anucharan Murugaiyan	Karunakaran, Yogi Babu, Lakshmi Priyaa Chandramouli	Super Talkies	
J U L	8	Watch	Vijay Ashokan	Krrish Kumar, Sabreena Alam, Mathew Varghese	VA Studios	
J U L	14	The Warriorr	N. Lingusamy	Ram Pothineni, Aadhi Pinisetty, Krithi Shetty	Srinivasa Silver Screen	
J U L	15	Gargi	Gautham Ramachandran	Sai Pallavi, Kaali Venkat, Aishwarya Lekshmi	Blacky, Genie & My Left Foot Production	
J U L	15	Iravin Nizhal	R. Parthiban	R. Parthiban, Varalaxmi Sarathkumar, Robo Shankar	Bioscope Film Framers	
J U L	15	My Dear Bootham	N. Ragavan	Prabhu Deva, Ashwanth, Remya Nambeesan	Abhishek Films	
J U L	22	Bhoothamangalam Post	Rajan Malaisamy	Rajan Malaisamy, Mounika Reddy, Vijay Govindasamy	CCV Groups	
J U L	22	Dejavu	Arvindh Srinivasan	Arulnithi, Madhoo, Smruthi Venkat	White Carpet Films	
J U L	22	Maha	U. R. Jameel	Hansika Motwani, Silambarasan, Srikanth	Etcetera Entertainment	
J U L	22	Nadhi	K. Thamaraiselvan	Sam Jones, Anandhi, Karu Pazhaniappan	Mas Cinemas	
J U L	22	Sivi 2	K. R. Senthil Nathan	Tej Charanraj, Yogi, Swathisha	Thulasi Cine Arts	
J U L	22	Ward 126	Selvakumar Chellapandiyan	Michael Thangadurai, Jishnu Menon, Shritha Sivadas	SSB Talkies	
J U L	28	Jothi	A. V. Krishna Paramatma	Vetri, Sheela Rajkumar, Krisha Kurup	SPR Studios	
J U L	28	The Legend	J. D.–Jerry	Arul Saravanan, Urvashi Rautela, Geethika Tiwari	Legend Saravana Stores Productions	
J U L	29	Battery	Mani Bharathi	Senguttuvan, Ammu Abhirami, Yog Japee	Sri Annamalaiyar Pictures	
J U L	29	Gulu Gulu	Rathna Kumar	Santhanam, Athulya Chandra, Pradeep Rawat	Circle Box Entertainment	
J U L	29	Kolathuran	S. Kalaichandran	KPY Ramar, Saravana Sakthi, Karthick	Karthick International Films	
J U L	29	Vattam	Kamalakannan	Sibi Sathyaraj, Andrea Jeremiah, Athulya Ravi	Dream Warrior Pictures	
A U G	4	Yenni Thuniga	S. K. Vettri Selvan	Jai, Athulya Ravi, Vamsi Krishna	Krikes Cine Creations	
A U G	5	Kaatteri	Deekay	Vaibhav, Varalaxmi Sarathkumar, Aathmika, Sonam Bajwa	Studio Green	
A U G	5	Kuruthi Aattam	Sri Ganesh	Atharvaa, Priya Bhavani Shankar, Radhika Sarathkumar	Rock Fort Entertainment	
A U G	5	Last 6 Hours (Note: Simultaneously shot in Malayalam language.)	Sunish Kumar	Bharath, Anoop Khalid, Viviya Santh	Lazy Cat Productions	
A U G	5	My Dear Lisa	Ranjan Krishnadevan	Vijay Vasanth, Chandini Tamilarasan	Srinidhi Films	
A U G	5	Poikkal Kudhirai	Santhosh P. Jayakumar	Prabhu Deva, Prakash Raj, Varalaxmi Sarathkumar	Mini Studio	
A U G	5	Vattakara	K. Bharathi Kannan	Mahesh, Satheesh, Aleesha George	Crowni Cinemas	
A U G	12	Cadaver	Anoop S. Panicker	Amala Paul, Riythvika, Athulya Ravi	Amala Paul Productions	
A U G	12	Kadamaiyai Sei	Venkat Raghavan	S. J. Suryah, Yashika Aannand, Rajendran	Ganesh Entertainment	
A U G	12	Viruman	M. Muthaiah	Karthi, Aditi Shankar, Rajkiran	2D Entertainment	
A U G	15	Yuddha Kaandam	P. Anandharajan	Sriram Karthik, Krisha Kurup, Bose Venkat	Paradise Cinemas	
A U G	18	Amman Thayee	Chandrahasan	Julie, Anbu, Saran, Perachipandiyan	RA Thamizhan Productions	
A U G	18	Thiruchitrambalam	Mithran Jawahar	Dhanush, Nithya Menen, Raashi Khanna	Sun Pictures	
A U G	19	Jiivi 2	V. J. Gopinath	Vetri, Ashwini Chandrashekar, Karunakaran	V House Productions	
A U G	19	Mayathirai	T. Sampath Kumar	Ashok Kumar, Sheela Rajkumar, Chandini Tamilarasan	SSNC Movies	
A U G	19	Methagu 2	R. K. Yogendran	Gowrishankar, Mani Kutti, Eeshwar Baasha	Methagu Thiraikkalam	
A U G	26	Company	S. Thangarajan	Pandi, Murugesan, Tiresh Kumar	Shri Mahananda Cinemas	
A U G	26	Diary	Innasi Pandiyan	Arulnithi, Pavithra Marimuthu, Kishore	Five Star Creations	
A U G	26	Eppo Kalyanam	Ceciliaraj	Vishwa, Ranjan Kumar, Livingston	Chowdeswari Productions	
A U G	26	John Ahiya Naan	Appu K. Sami	Appu K. Sami, Nakshatra Rao, Nizhalgal Ravi	U Creations	
A U G	26	Kanmani Pappa	Manimaran	Manasvi Kottachi, Miyasree Soumya, Thaman Kumar	SMS Pictures	
A U G	31	Cobra	R. Ajay Gnanamuthu	Vikram, Srinidhi Shetty, Irfan Pathan	Seven Screen Studio	
A U G	31	Natchathiram Nagargiradhu	Pa. Ranjith	Kalaiyarasan, Kalidas Jayaram, Dushara Vijayan	Neelam Productions	
S E P	8	Captain	Shakti Soundar Rajan	Arya, Aishwarya Lekshmi, Simran	The Show People	
S E P	9	Idhuthaan Kaadhala	Rajasimma	Saran, Ashmitha, Ayesha	Kurinji Films	
S E P	9	Kanam	Shree Karthick	Sharwanand, Ritu Varma, Amala Akkineni	Dream Warrior Pictures	
S E P	9	Lilly Rani	Vishnu Ramakrishnan	Chaya Singh, Thambi Ramaiah, Dushyanth	Clapin Cinemass	
S E P	9	Not Reachable	Chandru Muruganantham	Vishwa, Sai Dhanya, Shuba Devaraj	Crackbrain Productions	
S E P	9	Riya - The Haunted House	Karthik Sivan	Pandiarajan, Vaiyapuri, Kumaresan	Sri Dayakaran Cini Production	
S E P	15	Vendhu Thanindhathu Kaadu	Gautham Vasudev Menon	Silambarasan, Siddhi Idnani, Radhika Sarathkumar	Vels Film International	
S E P	16	Doodi	Karthik Madhusudhan	Karthick Madhusudhan, Shritha Sivadas	Connecting Dots Productions	
S E P	16	Sinam	G. N. R. Kumaravelan	Arun Vijay, Pallak Lalwani, Kaali Venkat	Movie Slides	
S E P	23	Aadhaar	Ramnath Palanikumar	Karunas, Arun Pandian, Ineya, Riythvika	Vennila Creations	
S E P	23	Buffoon	Ashok Veerappan	Vaibhav, Anagha, Joju George	Stone Bench Films	
S E P	23	Drama	Aju Kizhumala	Kishore, Charle, Jai Bala, Kavya Bellu	Vibe 3 Productions	
S E P	23	Kuzhali	Chera Kalaiyarasan	Vicky, Aara, Shalini Saroj	Mukkuzhi Films	
S E P	23	Rendagam	Fellini T. P.	Arvind Swamy, Kunchacko Boban, Eesha Rebba	August Cinema	
S E P	23	Trigger	Sam Anton	Atharvaa, Tanya Ravichandran, Arun Pandian	Pramod Films	
S E P	29	Naane Varuvean	Selvaraghavan	Dhanush, Elli AvrRam, Indhuja Ravichandran	V Creations	
S E P	30	Ponniyin Selvan: I	Mani Ratnam	Vikram, Karthi, Aishwarya Rai Bachchan, Jayam Ravi, Trisha	Lyca Productions	

=== October – December ===
Opening		Title	Director	Casta	Studio	Ref
O C T	7	Pistha	M. Ramesh Bhaarath	Shirish Saravanan, Mrudula Murali, Arundhati Nair	One Man Productions	
O C T	7	Ree	Sundharavadivel	Prasanth Srinivasan, Gayatri Rema, Prasath	Srianga Productions	
O C T	14	Aattral	K. L. Kannan	Vidharth, Shrita Rao, Vamsi Krishna	Chevvanthy Movies	
O C T	14	Kadhalicha Thappa	Surya Kumaran	Surya Kumaran, Vennila, Nakshatra	Sandhanam Films	
O C T	14	Mugamariyaan	Saimora	Kiran Kumar, Gayatri Rema, Y. G. Mahendran	American Angle Pictures	
O C T	14	Repeat Shoe	Kalyaan	Priya Kalyaan, Yogi Babu, Dileepan	Netco Studios	
O C T	14	Sanjeevan	Mani Shekar	Vinod Logydass, Dhivya Duraisamy, Sathya NJ	Malar Movie Makers	
O C T	16	Super Senior Heroes	Karthik Kumar	K. Bhagyaraj, Ambika, Pandiarajan, Chinni Jayanth	Yoodlee Films	
O C T	21	Prince	Anudeep K. V.	Sivakarthikeyan, Maria Ryaboshapka, Sathyaraj	Suresh Productions	
O C T	21	Sardar	P. S. Mithran	Karthi, Raashii Khanna, Rajisha Vijayan, Chunky Pandey	Prince Pictures	
O C T	28	Kaalangalil Aval Vasantham	Raghav Mirdath	Kaushik Ram, Anjali Nair, Heroshini Komali	Aram Entertainment	
N O V	4	4554	Karnan Mariyappan	Ashok Kumar, Sheela Nair, Benjamin	Mannan Studios	
N O V	4	Coffee with Kadhal	Sundar C	Jiiva, Jai, Srikanth, Malvika Sharma, Amritha Aiyer	Avni Cinemax	
N O V	4	Kanden Unnai Thanthen Ennai	Thangavelu Kannan	Arvind Varshan, Amsareka Nagendraraja, Megha Sri	Kannan Creations	
N O V	4	Love Today	Pradeep Ranganathan	Pradeep Ranganathan, Ivana, Sathyaraj	AGS Entertainment	
N O V	4	Nitham Oru Vaanam	Ra. Karthik	Ashok Selvan, Ritu Varma, Aparna Balamurali	Viacom18 Studios	
N O V	4	One Way	M. S. Sakthivel	Kovai Sarala, Aara, Rajathi Pandian	Group Productions	
N O V	11	Miral	M. Sakthivel	Bharath, Vani Bhojan, K. S. Ravikumar	Axess Film Factory	
N O V	11	Nanbaa	K. V. Mugi	Prabhu, Meena, Scissor Manohar	Sivagnanam Films	
N O V	11	Parole	Dwarakh Raja	R. S. Karthik, Linga, Kalpika Ganesh	Tripr Entertainment	
N O V	11	Thirumayee	Solomon Kannan	Ramchand, Anshitha, Masanamuthu	Saakshini Productions	
N O V	13	Radha Krishna	Rajini	Adithya, Kausalya, Livingston	Q STUDIO	
N O V	18	2323 The Beginning	Sathish Ramakrishnan	Sathish Ramakrishnan, Aroul D. Shankar, Sathvika Appaiah	Thyan Creatives	
N O V	18	Anel Meley Pani Thuli	R. Kaiser Anand	Andrea Jeremiah, Aadhav Kannadasan, Azhagam Perumal	Grass Root Film Company	
N O V	18	Gethule	V. R. R.	Srijeet, Eeriin Adhikary, Sayaji Shinde	RFI Films	
N O V	18	Gingee	Ganesh Chandrasekar	Ganesh Chandrasekar, Ksenya, Yogi Ram	Alien Pictures	
N O V	18	Kalaga Thalaivan	Magizh Thirumeni	Udhayanidhi Stalin, Nidhhi Agerwal, Arav, Kalaiyarasan	Red Giant Movies	
N O V	18	Karotiyin Kadhali	R. Siva	Elango Kumaravel, Janaki, T. Sivakumar	3S Pictures	
N O V	18	Naan Mirugamaai Maara	Sathyasiva	Sasikumar, Hariprriya, Vikranth	Chendur Film International	
N O V	18	Nokka Nokka	R. Muthukumar	Arjun Sundaram, Sindhiya, Ganja Karuppu	R Productions	
N O V	18	Yugi	Zac Harriss	Kathir, Pavithra Lakshmi, Anandhi, Narain, Natty	Juvis Productions	
N O V	25	Agent Kannayiram	Manoj Beedha	Santhanam, Riya Suman, Pugazh	Labyrinth Films	
N O V	25	Auto Is My Life	Shyju Parathadathil	Rendev, Sneka, Kavitha, Bindu	Revathy Films International	
N O V	25	Kaari	Hemanth	Sasikumar, Parvathy Arun, J. D. Chakravarthy	Prince Pictures	
N O V	25	Ottam	M. Muruhan	Pradeep Varma, Aishwarya Shindogi, Sai Dheena	Rikh Creations	
N O V	25	Pattathu Arasan	A. Sarkunam	Atharvaa, Rajkiran, Ashika Ranganath	Lyca Productions	
N O V	25	Powder	Vijay Sri G	Vidya Pradeep, Nikil Murugan, Rajendran	G Media	
N O V	25	Thoppukaranam	Baskar Sinouvassane	Gogen Naidu, Akshaya, Rishikeshwaran	Budobas International Films	
N O V	27	Coffee	Sai Krishna	Iniya, Rahul Dev, Mugdha Godse	Om Cine Ventures	
D E C	2	DSP	Ponram	Vijay Sethupathi, Anukreethy Vas, Prabhakar	Stone Bench Films	
D E C	2	Gatta Kusthi	Chella Ayyavu	Vishnu Vishal, Aishwarya Lekshmi, Karunas	RT Team Works	
D E C	2	Manja Kuruvi	Arangan Chinnathambi	Kishore, Neeraja, Rajanayagam	VR Combines	
D E C	2	Rivet	Arunkanth	Chaams, Santhana Bharathi, Uvesri	Pluto Media Works	
D E C	2	Therkathi Veeran	Saarath	Saarath, Anagha, Ashok Kumar, Kabir Duhan Singh	Chandrababu Film Factory	
D E C	9	Dha Dha	Guinness Kishore	Nithin Sathya, Gayatri Rema, Yogi Babu	Any Time Money Films	
D E C	9	Dr. 56 (Note: Simultaneously shot in Kannada language.)	Rajesh Anandaleela	Priyamani, Praveen Reddy, Raj Deepak Shetty	Hari Hara Pictures	
D E C	9	Estate	Karthik Vilvakrish	Ashok Selvan, Remya Nambeesan, Kalaiyarasan, Sunaina	Divine Productions	
D E C	9	Evil	Jagan Aloysius	Vijay Akash, Nithya Raj, Jeeva	Aryan Films	
D E C	9	Gurumoorthi	K. P. Tanasekar	Natty, Ramki, Poonam Bajwa, Sanjana Singh	T Friends Talkies	
D E C	9	Naai Sekar Returns	Suraj	Vadivelu, Sivaangi Krishnakumar, Redin Kingsley	Lyca Productions	
D E C	9	Rathasaatchi	Rafiq Ismail	Kanna Ravi, Elango Kumaravel, Harish Kumar	Magizh Mandram	
D E C	9	Sree Raja Manikandan	Sanjay Manikandan	Dharma, Divya, Lollu Sabha Manohar	Sri Sai Harish Productions	
D E C	9	Varalaru Mukkiyam	Santhosh Rajan	Jiiva, Kashmira Pardeshi, Pragya Nagra	Super Good Films	
D E C	9	Witness	Deepak	Shraddha Srinath, Rohini, Subatra Robert	People Media Factory	
D E C	16	181	Mohamad Issack	Gemini Ryker, Reena Krishnan, Vijay Chanduru	Sairaj Film Works	
D E C	16	Camera Error	Agaran	Agaran, Simran, Sudhir, Harini	Vistar Entertainments	
D E C	16	Katchikkaaran	P. Iyyappan	Vijith Saravanan, Swetha Dorathy, Appukutty	PSK Productions	
D E C	16	Magalir Maanbu	Perundurai Guna	Perundurai Guna, Ravi Kiran, Nancy	Guna Films	
D E C	22	Connect	Ashwin Saravanan	Nayanthara, Sathyaraj, Vinay Rai	Rowdy Pictures	
D E C	22	Laththi	A. Vinoth Kumar	Vishal, Sunaina, Ramana	Rana Productions	
D E C	22	Mofussil	N.P. Sarathy	Akhil, Sri Divya, Pandi	G. D. Films	
D E C	23	Enjoy	Perumal Kasi	Madhan Kumar, Vignesh, Sai Dhanya	LNH Creation	
D E C	23	Jasper	Yuvaraj D.	Vivek Rajgopal, Aishwarya Dutta, Bala	Visvaroopi Film Corporation	
D E C	23	Mr Daddy	Arumugam Selvam	Appukutty, Namo Narayana, Pandi	First Copy Movie Makers	
D E C	23	Nedu Neer	K. K. Padmanaban	Raj Krish, Indhuja, Sathya Murugan	Kavin Creators	
D E C	23	Paasakaara Paya	Viveka Bharathi	Vignesh, Gayatri Rema, Sethupathi	Khayan Pictures	
D E C	23	Peya Kaanom	Selva Anbarasan	Tarun Gopi, Meera Mitun, Jaguar Thangam	Global Entertainment	
D E C	23	Project C (Chapter 2)	Vno	Sri, Vasudha Krishnamoorthy, Chaams	Shark Fin Studios	
D E C	30	Aruvaa Sanda	Aadhiraajan	V. Raja, Malavika Menon, Saranya, Aadukalam Naren	White Screen Production	
D E C	30	College Road	Jai Amar Singh	Lingesh, Monica Chinnakotla, Ananth Nag, Bommu Lakshmi	MP Entertainment	
D E C	30	Driver Jamuna	P. Kinslin	Aishwarya Rajesh, Aadukalam Naren, Kavitha Bharathi	18 Reels	
D E C	30	Kadaisi Kadhal Kadhai	RKV	Akash Premkumar, Enakshi Ganguly, Pugazh	S Cube Pictures	
D E C	30	Oh My Ghost	R. Yuvan	Sunny Leone, Sathish, Yogi Babu, Dharsha Gupta	White Horse Studios	
D E C	30	Raangi	M. Saravanan	Trisha, Anaswara Rajan, John Mahendran	Lyca Productions	
D E C	30	Sakunthalavin Kadhalan	P. V. Prasath	P. V. Prasath, Bhanu, Pasupathy	Prasath Pictures	
D E C	30	Sembi	Prabhu Solomon	Kovai Sarala, Ashwin Kumar, Thambi Ramaiah	Trident Arts	
D E C	30	Udanpaal	Karthik Seenivasan	Linga, Gayathrie, Vivek Prasanna, Abarnathi	D Company	

== Awards ==
Category/organization	Ananda Vikatan Cinema Awards 30 March 2023
Best Film	Natchathiram Nagargiradhu
Best Director	Manikandan; Kadaisi Vivasaayi
Best Actor	Kamal Haasan; Vikram
Best Actress	Sai Pallavi; Gargi
Best Music Director	A. R. Rahman; Cobra / Ponniyin Selvan: I / Vendhu Thanindhathu Kaadu
