= Ushoshi Sengupta =

Indian model (b. 1988)

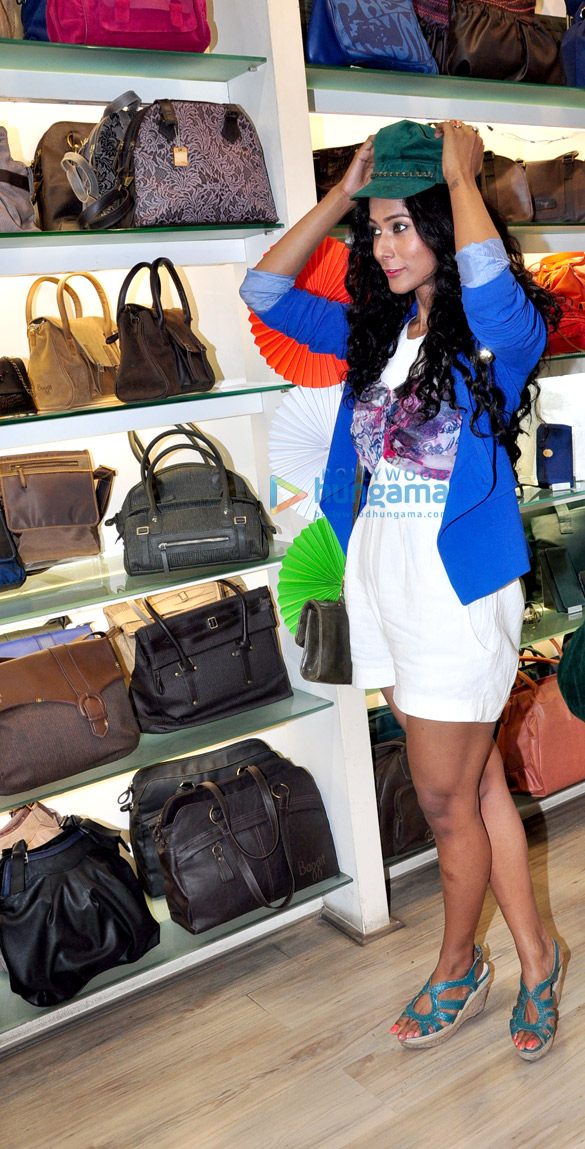
- Ushoshi Sengupta
- Born: Kolkata, West Bengal, India
- Height: 1.71 m (5 ft 7 1/2 in)
- Beauty pageant titleholder
- Title: I AM She 2010
- Hair color: Black
- Eye color: Brown
- Major competitions: I AM She 2010 (Winner); Miss Universe 2010 unplaced

Ushoshi Sengupta is an Indian actress, model and beauty pageant titleholder who won the title of I Am She – Miss Universe India and represented India in Miss Universe 2010 held at Mandalay Bay, Las Vegas, Nevada, on 23 August 2010.

== Early life ==
Born in Kolkata, Sengupta is the daughter of an official in the Indian Air Force. She graduated from Kendriya Vidyalaya, Ballygunje, Kolkata, where she excelled at mathematics and was offered a scholarship to an engineering college, but decided to pursue liberal arts and professional modeling. She has a bachelor's degree in Humanities from the St. Xavier's College, Kolkata of the University of Calcutta, and worked as a model before becoming Miss Universe India. Sengupta made her debut in the Bengali movie industry with Egoler Chokh which was released in August 2016 and was directed by Arindam Sil.

== Filmography ==
=== Film career ===
Year	Name	Language	Director	Co-cast	Character
2012	Housefull 2: The Dirty Dozen	Hindi	Sajid Khan	Akshay Kumar, Asin, John Abraham, Ritesh Deshmukh, Jacqueline Fernandez	Cameo
2013	Goodbye December	Malayalam	Sajeed A.	Nandini Rai	
2016	Eagoler Chokh	Bengali	Arindam Sil	Saswata Chatterjee, Joya Ahsan, Payel Sarkar, Anirban Bhattacharya, Gaurav Chakraborty, Arunima Ghosh, June Malia	Shyamangi

== Miss Universe 2010 ==
Ushoshi won the first edition of I am She - Miss Universe India, a national pageant organized by Tantra Entertainment Private limited, in collaboration with former Miss Universe Sushmita Sen. As the official representative of her country to the 2010 Miss Universe pageant held in Las Vegas, Nevada on 23 August 2010, she participated as one of the 83 delegates who vied for the crown of eventual winner, Ximena Navarrete of Mexico.

Awards and achievements
New title	I Am She; 2010	Succeeded by Vasuki Sunkavalli
Preceded by Ekta Chowdhry as Femina Miss India Universe	Miss Universe India; 2010	Succeeded by Vasuki Sunkavalli
