= Goodbye December =

- Directed by: Sajeed A
- Written by: Sajeed A Rajesh Narasimhan; Sushant Shukla; Josy Joseph
- Produced by: Sadanandan Rangorath; Debobroto Mandal
- Starring: Nandini Rai; Ushoshi Sengupta
- Music by: Shillong Chamber Choir
- Production company: Lucsam Creations
- Release date: 20 December 2013
- Country: India
- Language: Malayalam

Goodbye December is a 2013 Malayalam-language musical romance film directed by Sajeed A and produced by Sadanandan Rangorath. The film stars debuting actress and Miss Universe India 2010, Ushoshi Sengupta and Nandini Rai.

The film also marks the debut of Shillong Chamber Choir who will be singing, composing the songs and even doing the background score for the film. The song "Madi Madi", is the first Malayalam song to be aired in BBC Radio.

== Cast ==
- Nandini Rai
- Ushoshi Sengupta
