= Sadanandan Rangorath =

Indian film producer and businessman

Sadanandan
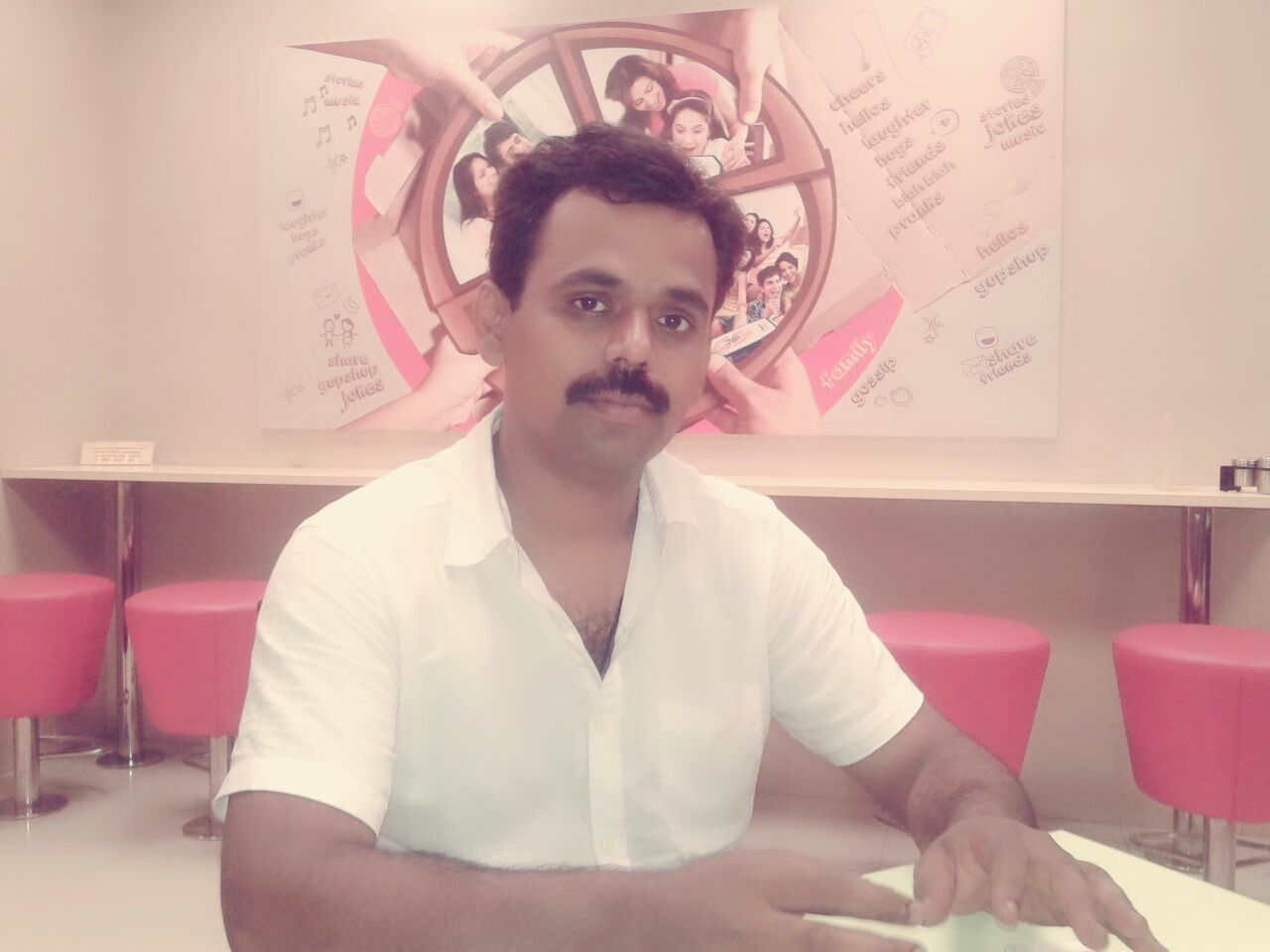
- Born: Sadanandan Rangorath; 14 July 1980 (age 46); Kollengode, Palakkad, India
- Occupations: Film producer Film director Business engineering
- Years active: 2002 – present

Sadanandan Rangorath is an Indian film producer and businessman best known in Malayalam cinema. He entered Malayalam cinema producer of Salt N' Pepper directed by Aashiq Abu which got released in 2011 The Movie was the block buster of the year winning the Kerala State Award. for the popular movie of the year.

== Personal life ==
Lucsam Sadanandan Rangorath was born in Kollengode, Palakkad Kerala. He completed his schooling at Muslim Higher Secondary school Pudunagaram, Palakkad and completed his diploma in Mechanical Engineering at Government Polytechnic Palakkad. Sadanandan was booked by the police in May 2014 on a cheating case.

From 2014 till 2025, Sadanandan has been booked in several case u/s IPC 406, 419, 420 in multiple jurisdictions of Bangalore. He has been famously linked with the brand Realtymonk (Vesta Power Private Limited), a real estate management company.

RealtyMonk is recorded to have cheated hundreds of owners and tenants in collusion with the current directors Harish K and Raghunath Periasamy. Sadanandan and Harish have been convicted in Chennai as well in 2023.

Sadanandan has been lodged multiple times in Bangalore Parappana Agrahara Jail, Mumbai, Chennai and is currently absconding after cheating public of sum of upto 1 Cr.

== Career ==
He started Vesta Engineering in Mumbai and then diversified into fields including oil and gas drilling and exploration, power generation, hospitality, real estate and as a film producer.

== Filmography ==
=== As producer ===
Year	Film	Director
2011	Salt N' Pepper	Aashiq Abu
2012	Nidra	Sidharth Bharathan
2013	Goodbye December	Sajeed A.
2015	Rich N Famous	Anoop Mohan
2016	Aval - Journey of a woman	Sanjay padiyoor
