= Enjoy =

Enjoy may refer to:

== Film and theater ==
- Enjoy (2021 film), a British short film
- Enjoy (2022 film), an Indian Tamil-language romantic comedy
- Enjoy (play), a 1980 comedy by Alan Bennett
- Enjoy (2006 play), a play by Toshiki Okada

== Music ==
- Enjoy! (Descendents album) or the title song, 1986
- Enjoy! (Jeanette album) or the title song, 2000
- Enjoy, an album by Bob Sinclar, 2004
- Enjoy, an album by Sakurako Ohara, 2018
- "Enjoy", a song by Björk from Post, 1995
- "Enjoy", a song by Janet Jackson from 20 Y.O., 2006
- Enjoy Records, a 1962–1987 American record label

== Other uses ==
- Enjoy (car sharing), an Italian car-sharing service
- Enjoy Contemporary Art Space, Wellington, New Zealand
- Enjoy Technology, a defunct American company founded by Ron Johnson

== See also ==
- Anand (disambiguation), Sanskrit for happiness
- Happiness
- Joy
