= Akku =

Akku may refer to:

- Akku (2008 film), an Indian Tamil-language action thriller film
- Akku (2023 film), an Indian Tamil-language crime thriller and horror film
- Akku Akbar, Indian film director in Malayalam cinema
- Akku Yadav, Indian criminal
- Akku, Kazakhstan, a settlement in Pavlodar Region
- Akku District, Kazakhstan
