= Ten Hours =

- Theatrical release poster
- Directed by: Ilayaraja Kaliyaperumal
- Written by: Ilayaraja Kaliyaperumal
- Produced by: Latha Balu; Durgaini Vinoth
- Starring: Sibi Sathyaraj
- Cinematography: Jai Karthik
- Edited by: Lawrence Kishore
- Music by: KS Sundramoorthy
- Production company: Duvin Studios
- Distributed by: Five Star K. Senthil
- Release date: 18 April 2025
- Running time: 114 minutes
- Country: India
- Language: Tamil

10 Hours is a 2025 Indian Tamil-language action thriller film written and directed by Ilayaraja Kaliyaperumal and produced by Latha Balu and Durgaini Vinoth under Duvin Studios banner. The film stars Sibi Sathyaraj in the lead role alongside Gajaraj, Dileepan, Jeeva Ravi, Saravana Subbiah, Raj Ayyappa, Aadukalam Murugadoss, THR Raaga Uthaya and others in supporting roles.

Ten Hours released in theatres on 18 April 2025.

== Plot ==
In 2015, Castro, a forthright Sub-Inspector at Mattuthavani Police Station, took on the case of a missing girl who had been brutally raped and murdered, despite facing resistance from within the station itself. He discovered that the perpetrator was none other than the influential police station inspector, who attempted to bribe his way out of punishment. Castro, unwilling to let justice be compromised, shot the inspector dead for his heinous crime. Years later, Castro, now an Inspector at Aathur Police Station, receives a complaint about a missing girl near Thendral Nagar on the eve of a by-election.

During the investigation, Castro determines that Sowmya was kidnapped in a premeditated act. He alerts the checkposts, but the kidnappers manage to escape after killing three policemen. Castro arrives at the scene, deduces the car's color, and begins chasing the kidnappers. After capturing them, Castro learns that Sowmya's dead body has been transferred to another vehicle. The main kidnapper taunts Castro over the phone, claiming he can evade capture. That same night, a man calls the police control room, reporting that a girl is being tortured on a bus traveling from Koyambedu to Coimbatore. Castro tracks down the bus near Kallakurichi tollgate, only to find a dead body, Jeeva, inside the bus, with no sign of the girl. Castro takes all the passengers into custody and begins investigating. When SI Mani reveals that Jeeva was the one who made the distress call, Jeeva's girlfriend Divya accuses the bus attendant, Maari, of killing him.

Maari recounts the events from the bus's departure from Koyambedu, mentioning that Janani Narayanan failed to board at the first pickup point, Ashok Nagar, and instead, two other passengers, Raju and Vinoth, boarded in a hurry. A fight breaks out between Jeeva and Maari when Maari scolds a pregnant woman for vomiting. Further investigation introduces Dr. Daisy Rose, who boards the bus at Maraimalai Nagar pickup point. She medicates Maari after the fight with Jeeva and later apologizes to Jeeva for his concern over the pregnant woman. Divya reveals to Castro that she sat next to the pregnant woman to console her. She also shares her past with Jeeva, explaining how they eloped when she was forced into marriage with another person. At the police station, Divya spots Kesavan, her brother Jegan's friend, and informs the police that he might be involved in Jeeva's murder. Kesavan reveals that he boarded the bus on Divya's brother, Jegan's instructions to follow Jeeva and Divya.

The fingerprints on the knife used to kill Jeeva match those of Guru, who confesses to having been caught recording women in a bakery bathroom and beaten by Jeeva. Guru denies killing Jeeva, claiming he was already dead when he attempted to harm him. Two suspects, Kasi and Sethu, who posed as Raju and Vinoth, reveal they were paid to kill Jeeva and claim that, Kesavan is the person who hired them to kill Jeeva. Jegan and Divya's father attempt to rescue Kesavan, but Castro apprehends him. However, a human rights commission member intervenes, criticizing Castro's aggressive investigation methods. Meanwhile, Jeeva's corpse goes missing during the autopsy process but is soon recovered from a store room within the same premises. The doctor reveals that Jeeva was intoxicated before being killed, and the corpse was hidden to delay the investigation. Another piece of evidence, Jeeva's wristwatch, goes missing. Sub-Inspector Karan informs Castro about a girl being abducted, and Castro fights off the goons. The abducted girl is revealed to be Janani Narayanan, a journalist who was supposed to board the bus at Ashok Nagar but didn't. She is still alive.

Castro confirms with the Ashok Nagar police station that Janani Narayanan didn't board the bus. He tracks down another suspect, Jothi, a driver for Iympon Travels, who is under surveillance. Castro identifies the murderer as the bus driver, Velu, and shares his findings with SI Mani. He reveals that two identical buses with the same registration number were operating with a 30-minute gap. Castro explains the events, starting with Velu adding sleeping pills to Jeeva's water and using a screwdriver from the toolkit to kill him. Velu's guilt is further confirmed by a difference in the selfie photograph with a fellow passenger and the investigation photos. During interrogation, Velu reveals that the bus was used for smuggling goods, and they used duplicate buses with the same registration number. Janani Narayanan, who boarded the first bus at Ashok Nagar, witnessed the smuggling and was subsequently killed and molested. Jeeva, riding in the second bus, witnessed the crime and informed the police, prompting Velu to intoxicate him. Velu then killed Jeeva with the help of Babu, the cleaner from the first bus.

The crew of the first bus disposed of Janani near the Kallakurichi subway, which Castro had earlier recovered. Before Velu could reveal more about the smuggling, he was shot by a prison inmate who was orchestrated by the bus owner. The smuggled goods and the first bus's crew were eliminated before they could be caught. Castro discovers that the mastermind behind the smuggling and murders is Meikappan, the owner of Iympon Travels, who orchestrated the crimes to win the by-election. Meikappan had kidnapped and then later killed the MLA, so that a by-election would be announced, and to win in the elections, he kidnapped Sowmya and threatened her father, the election officer, to rig the election by swapping the ballot boxes with fake ones containing pre-cast votes in his favor. With the truth revealed, the film concludes with Castro encounter-killing Meikappan.

== Cast ==
- Sibi Sathyaraj as Inspector R. Castro
- Gajaraj as SI Mani
- Aadukalam Murugadoss as Maari, Bus Conductor
- Saravana Subbiah as an Election officer
- Dileepan as Meikappan
- Jeeva Ravi as a Doctor
- THR Raaga Uthaya as Velu, bus driver
- Dileepan Kumar as SI Karan
- Raj Ayyappa as Jeeva
- Thangadurai as a bus passenger
- Kureishi as a bus passenger
- Raanav V C as a bus passenger
- Sujatha Babu as a Human Rights Commission member
- Sharumiishaa as Divya
- Nishanth
- Thivyah Pramila Rajagopal as Sowmya
- Siddhartha
- Agalya
- Ajay Rathnam as Divya's father

== Production ==
On the day of New Year 2025, Sibi Sathyaraj who last appeared in Vattam (2022) announced his upcoming project through a first look poster titled Ten Hours, written and directed by debutant Ilayaraja Kaliyaperumal. The film stars Gajaraj, Dileepan, Jeeva Ravi, Saravana Subbiah, Raj Ayyappa, Thangadurai, Aadukalam Murugadoss and others in supporting roles. The film is produced by Latha Balu and Durgaini Vinoth under the Duvin Studios banner, while the technical team consists of cinematographer Jai Karthik, editor Lawrence Kishore, art director Arunshankar Durai and music composer KS Sundaramoorthy.

== Release ==
=== Theatrical ===
Ten Hours released in theatres on 18 April 2025. Earlier it was planned for Pongal but got postponed to the month of April 2025.

=== Home media ===
Ten Hours was premiered on Prime Video on 9 May 2025.

== Critical reception ==
Critics of Dinamalar and Maalai Malar rated the film 3/5.

Abhinav Subramanian of The Times of India gave 2/5 stars and wrote "The real issue isn't just familiarity, it's how haphazardly everything unfolds. Clues and plot points seem to pop up out of convenience rather than organic development.[...] Instead of letting the mystery breathe, the film leans heavily on flashbacks and exposition dumps, with characters explaining deductions or spilling backstories under interrogation." Akshay Kumar of Cinema Express wrote ”Ten Hours is a taut whodunnit thriller that could have been more if only the suspects had convincing motives. [...] Debutant Ilayaraja's watertight screenplay and Sibi's adequate shouldering and thrills at regular intervals make Ten Hours a winner."
