= Rooban =

Indian Tamil-language devotional film

- Theatrical release poster
- Directed by: Ayyappan
- Written by: Ayyappan
- Produced by: Arumugam Kaliappan; Karur Elang Karthikeyan; Raja manogaran
- Starring: Vijay Prasath; Gayatri Rema
- Cinematography: Rajeev Rajendran
- Edited by: Ramnath
- Music by: Aravind Babu
- Production company: AKR Future Films
- Release date: 20 April 2024
- Country: India
- Language: Tamil

Rooban is a 2024 Indian Tamil-language devotional film written and directed by Ayyappan. The film stars Vijay Prasath and Gayatri Rema. The film was produced by Arumugam Kaliappan, Karur Elang Karthikeyan and Raja Manogaran under the banner of AKR Future Films.

== Cast ==
- Vijay Prasath as Shanmugam
- Gayatri Rema as Parvathi
- Charlie as Siththan
- Ramar as Pandi
- Karur Elang Karthikeyan
- Arumugam Kaliappan
- Raja Manogaran
- Ganja Karuppu

== Reception ==
Maalai Malar critic rated one star out of five and gave mixed reviews.

Amitabh Budholia of News18 rated three point five of five star and stated that "If we look at the technical brilliance of the film, Arvind Babu's music penetrates the mind and heart. Connects the audience with the film with emotional depth. Especially, devotional songs and music have become good."
