= Karimugan =

2018 Indian Tamil-language romantic comedy drama film by Chella Thangaiah

- Film poster
- Directed by: Chella Thangaiah
- Produced by: T. Chithirai Selvi
- Starring: Senthil Ganesh; Gayatri Rema; Chella Thangaiah
- Cinematography: Ezhil Selvan
- Edited by: T. Pannier Selvam; R. Kesavan
- Music by: Chella Thangaiah
- Production company: A Vimal Production
- Release date: 25 October 2018
- Running time: 120 minutes
- Country: India
- Language: Tamil

Karimugan (transl. Blackfaced man) is a 2018 Indian Tamil-language action comedy film written and directed by Chella Thangaiah. The film stars folk singer Senthil Ganesh and Gayatri Rema in the main lead roles. The plot of the film based on the teenage love and about a man Karimugan who hails from Pudukkottai comes to Chennai to solve his family dispute. The music for the film and the lyrics for the film were also written by the director Chella Thangaiah. It was released on 25 October 2018 and received extremely negative reviews from critics.

== Cast ==
- Senthil Ganesh
- Gayatri Rema
- Yogiram
- Bava Lakshmanan
- P. Sai Kumar
- Chella Thangaiah
- Vincent Roy
- Vijay Ganesh
- Selvakumar
- Sai Aishwarya
- Deepasri
- Ramadevi
- Kalaiselvi
- R. K. Senthil
- Rajathi Rajan
- Sethuraman
- Devanesan
- Kotiswaran

== Production ==
The film project was announced by director Chella Thangaiah, who is well known as the music teacher of popular folk singer Senthil Ganesh. This was Senthil Ganesh's second film after Thirudu Pogatha Manasu (2014) and was also the second collaboration between Senthil Ganesh and Chella Thangaiah. Senthil was signed to play the lead role in the film as an electrician while being a contestant in the Super Singer 6. Newcomer Gayatri Rema made her film acting debut through this film who was originally based from Kerala and was roped into play the female lead opposite Senthil Ganesh in the film after being auditioned.
