= Gomathi Shankar =

Indian actor (born 1990)

- Born: Chennai, Tamil Nadu, India
- Occupations: Actor; Director; Film Writer
- Years active: 2015 - present

Gomathi Shankar is an Indian actor who works in Tamil language movies.

== Career ==
Apart from acting, he is known for his involvement across multiple creative roles like directing and film writing, focusing on meaningful and content oriented projects.

He debuted as a lead actor in the 2025 Tamil crime thriller, Stephen, in which he played the role of a perpetrator who self-confesses of carrying out serial killing. Alongside Mithun Balaji, Gomathi Shankar has contributed to the film's story writing.

Prior to playing a lead role, he has done multiple supporting roles, namely in movies like Lover, Dsp, Gargi, and Dharala Prabhu, which reflect his range as an actor and his interest in narrative driven cinema.

== Filmography ==
Key
†	Denotes films that have not yet been released

- All films are in Tamil-language, unless otherwise noted.

Year	Film	Role	Notes	Ref
2020	Dharala Prabhu		Supporting actor	
2022	Gargi		Supporting actor	
2022	Dsp		Supporting actor	
2024	Lover		Supporting actor	
2025	Stephen	Stephen Jebaraj	Debut in a lead role	
