= Oomai Sennaai =

- Film poster
- Directed by: Arjunan Ekalaivan
- Written by: Arjunan Ekalaivan
- Produced by: Arjunan Ekalaivan
- Starring: Michael Thangadurai; Sanam Shetty
- Cinematography: Kalyan Venkatraman
- Edited by: Athul Vijay
- Music by: Siva
- Production company: Life Goes On Pictures
- Distributed by: Action Reaction Jenish
- Release date: 10 December 2021
- Country: India
- Language: Tamil

Oomai Sennaai (transl. Mute wolf) is a 2021 Indian Tamil-language drama thriller film written, directed, and produced by Arjunan Ekalaivan. The film stars Michael Thangadurai and Sanam Shetty in the lead roles. The music was composed by Siva with cinematography by Kalyan Venkatraman and editing by Athul Vijay. The film released on 10 December 2021.

== Plot ==
The film narrates the tale of a private detective who decides to change careers but has to deal with the repercussions of the men behind his last assignment. He resultantly gets entangled in a web of challenges posed by greedy politicians, corrupt cops and ruthless gangsters.

== Cast ==
- Michael Thangadurai as Parthiban
- Sanam Shetty as Amudha
- Jayakumar as Azhagappan
- Aroul D. Shankar as Rathnam
- Gajaraj as Mathivanan
- Sai Rajkumar as Sethu
- Jaya Rao
- Sampath
- Pillayar Ruthru
- Sivaraj Jr.
- Maarthini Saravanakumar
- Vijayashree

== Production ==
The film marked the directorial debut of Arjun Ekalaivan, an erstwhile assistant of Mysskin. The film had tentatively been titled Parthiban, before Oomai Sennaai was finalised.

Sanam Shetty was signed on to play a "de-glam" role in the film in early 2019, and it marked her first theatrical release after her stint and subsequent fame on Bigg Boss Tamil during 2020. The film's team promoted the film across Tamil Nadu in early December 2021.

== Release ==
=== Theatrical ===
The film was released on 10 December 2021 across theatres in Tamil Nadu. A critic from the Times of India gave the film a positive review, noting "the film rises up above its modest budget and stays intriguing and impressive most of the time", praising the performances of the technical team and actress Sanam Shetty. Other critics from Tamil newspapers such as Dina Malar and Daily Thanthi also reviewed the film.

=== Home media ===
The digital streaming rights of the film is owned by Amazon Prime Video. The film was released on Amazon Prime Video.
