= Raja Veetu Kannukutty =

Indian Tamil-language drama film

- Theatrical release poster
- Directed by: A. P. Rajiv
- Written by: A. P. Rajiv
- Produced by: Ramanathan R
- Starring: Adhith Silambarasan; Gayatri Rema; KPY Sarath
- Cinematography: Hari Kanth
- Music by: Isai Thalapathy Daisonraj
- Production company: Sri RR Movies
- Release date: 21 November 2025
- Country: India
- Language: Tamil

Raja Veetu Kannukutty is a 2025 Indian Tamil-language drama film written and directed by A. P. Rajiv. The film is produced by Ramanathan R under the banner Sri RR Movies.

It stars Adhith Silambarasan, Gayatri Rema, and KPY Sarath in the lead roles. The film is scheduled for theatrical release on 21 November 2025.

== Cast ==
- Adhith Silambarasan
- Gayatri Rema
- KPY Sarath

== Reception ==
Maalai Malar critic wrote that A.P. Rajeev has directed the film with a love story as its centerpiece.

Virakesari critic noted that the film's cinematography and background music are a consolation for the fans.
