= Stephen (film) =

2025 Tamil film

- Promotional release poster
- Directed by: Mithun Balaji
- Written by: Mithun Balaji; Gomathi Shankar
- Produced by: Jayakumar; Mohan
- Starring: Gomathi Shankar; Michael Thangadurai; Smruthi Venkat
- Production company: JM Production House
- Distributed by: Netflix
- Release date: 5 December 2025
- Country: India
- Language: Tamil

Stephen is a 2025 Indian Tamil-language psychological crime thriller film directed by Mithun Balaji in his directorial debut and produced by Jayakumar and Mohan produce the film under the JM Production House banner. The film stars Gomathi Shankar in the titular role alongside Michael Thangadurai and Smruthi Venkat in pivotal roles. The film marks the debut of Gomathi Shankar in the lead role, who had earlier appeared in supporting roles in films such as Dharala Prabhu (2020), Gargi (2022), and Lover (2024). Apart from acting, Shankar has also contributed as a writer along with Mithun.

Stephen premiered on Netflix on 5 December 2025.

== Plot ==
Stephen calmly walks into a police station and confesses to killing nine women, baffling authorities. Police Inspector Michael and psychiatrist Seema investigate, exploring Stephen's past and the motivations behind his crimes, initially suspecting childhood trauma. The film explores Stephen's disturbed mind, revealing a cunning personality who uses acting auditions as a lure, but his true goals are deeper. The climax reveals Stephen's confession and surrender were part of a master plan to manipulate the justice system and achieve freedom, using a fabricated narrative of abuse to escape a harsher sentence. The story delves into guilt, trauma, fractured identity, and the blurred lines between victim and perpetrator, keeping the audience guessing until the end.

== Cast ==
- Gomathi Shankar as Stephen Jebaraj
- Michael Thangadurai as Michael
- Smruthi Venkat as Seema
- Kuberan as Stephen's father
- Vijayashree as Stephen's mother
- Shrisha as Krithika
- Erumasaani Harija as Mary John
- Amar Ramesh as Raju

== Release ==
Stephen was premiered on Netflix on 5 December 2025 in Tamil, Telugu, Malayalam, Kannada and Hindi languages.

== Reception ==
Jayabhuvaneshwari B of Cinema Express gave 3/5 stars and wrote "A twist-filled whydunit that delves into the mental anatomy of a killer, powered by strong performances and a sharp psychological payoff." Shubhra Gupta of The Indian Express gave 2.5/5 stars and wrote "What rescues Stephen, and brings it back to its initial sharpness, is the last act with all its revelatory strands. Smartly shot and enacted, the portion is chilling, just the way it ought to be in a film like this." Janani K of India Today gave 2.5/5 stars and wrote "Director Mithun Balaji shows promise in his ability to build atmosphere and maintain tension. [...] However, the film's fatal flaw lies in its overambitious climax. In trying to deliver one twist too many, it undermines the careful character study it had been building." Anusha Sundar of OTT Play gave 2.5/5 stars and wrote "Stephen is an engaging psycho thriller which honestly wants to stir away from the cliches of the genre. [...] But it isn’t flawless either. The film, while escaping the cliches of serial killer genre, becomes a victim when it goes fat-stretched to be unique. Still a decent attempt."

Bhuvanesh Chandar of The Hindu wrote "A fantastic subversion in the final act flips what seemed like a juvenile psycho-thriller into a genre-redefining effort, but it is a tough bargain to ask audiences to wade through murk to reach the payoff."

== See also ==
- Primal Fear
