= Kasu Mela Kasu =

2018 Indian Tamil-language comedy-drama film directed by K. S. Pazhani

- Theatrical release poster
- Directed by: K. S. Pazhani
- Written by: K. S. Pazhani
- Produced by: P. Hariharan; B. Udayakumar; P. Radhakrishnan
- Starring: Shahrukh Khan Raffi; Gayatri Rema
- Cinematography: Suresh Devan
- Edited by: Gopalakrishnan
- Music by: M. S. Pandian
- Production company: Ragav Movie Entertainment
- Release date: 6 July 2018
- Running time: 130 minutes
- Country: India
- Language: Tamil

Kasu Mela Kasu (transl. Endless money) is a 2018 Indian Tamil-language comedy drama film directed by K. S. Pazhani and starring Shahrukh and Gayatri Rema.

== Cast ==
- Shahrukh Khan Raffi as Murali
- Gayatri Rema as Myna
- Mayilsamy as Periyasamy, Murali's father
- Kovai Sarala as beggar and Myna's mother
- Nalini as Murali' s paternal aunt
- Swaminathan as Murali' s maternal uncle
- Lollu Sabha Easter as kidnapper
- K. S. Pazhani as Myna's father
- Jangiri Madhumitha as Myna's step mother
- Sangeetha Balan
- Vasathakumar as Priest
- Ganja Karuppu (cameo appearance)
- Lollu Sabha Mullai (special appearance)
- KPY Kothandam (special appearance)

== Reception ==
The Times of India gave the film a rating of one out of five stars and wrote that "Going by the primitive filmmaking and storytelling in this film, it feels quite a meta statement!". The New Indian Express wrote that "Throughout its painfully long runtime of 130 minutes, this KS Palani-directorial fails to evoke as much as a grin". Maalai Malar, however, reviewed the film more positively.
