= Aaragan =

- Theatrical release poster
- Directed by: Arun KR
- Written by: Arun KR
- Produced by: Harikaran Panchalingam
- Starring: Michael Thangadurai; Kavipriya Manoharan
- Cinematography: Surya Vaithi
- Edited by: Sasi Dhaksha
- Music by: Vivek; Jeshwanth
- Production company: Trending Arts Productions
- Release date: 4 October 2024
- Country: India
- Language: Tamil

Aaragan is a 2024 Indian Tamil-language fantasy thriller film written and directed by Arun KR. The film stars Michael Thangadurai and Kavipriya Manoharan in lead roles. It was released theatrically on 4 October 2024.

== Plot ==
Saravanan & Magizhnila, in love but financially unstable, see hope when Magizhnila lands a better job in a new town. However, her path soon fills with unexpected struggles. Her journey through these challenges is the essence of the story.

== Cast ==
- Michael Thangadurai as Saravanan
- Kavipriya Manoharan as Magizhnila
- Sriranjani as Valaralmadhi
- Kalairani
- Yazar as Senthil

== Production ==
The film was produced by Harikaran Panchalingam under the banner of Trending Arts Productions. The cinematography was done by Surya Vaithy while editing was handled by Sasi Dhaksha and music composed by Vivek and Jeshwanth.

== Release and reception ==
Aaragan was theatrically on 4 October 2024.

Abhinav Subramanian of The Times of India gave 2/5 stars and wrote "Aaragan is a confusing film. The story itself is rather convoluted, and you often find yourself wondering where it’s all headed." A critic from Dinamalar praised the realistic romance in the film while criticising the graphics and confusions in the ending of the second half. Virakesari appreciated the background music, art direction, cinematography and editing, saying the film's first half gives a great experience to the moviegoers but the second half gives a familiar experience.
