= Jeeva Ravi =

Indian actor

- Born: R. Raveendran; Tamil Nadu, India
- Other name: R. Ravi
- Occupation: Actor
- Years active: 2007–present
- Political party: Tamilaga Vettri Kazhagam (2025-present)

Jeeva Ravi is an Indian actor and casting director who has worked in Tamil-language films and television. He made a breakthrough as an actor with his performances in 3 (2012) and Jeeva (2014), with the latter film being a prefix for his stage name.

== Career ==
Ravi is the grandson of film producer G. N. Velumani, who made films in the 1950s and 1960s. Ravi began his career as a casting director, before acting in serials in STAR Vijay and Sun TV. He gradually moved on to feature in films and got his first major breakthrough by portraying Shruti Haasan's father in Aishwarya Dhanush's drama film, 3 (2012). He subsequently appeared in more prominent roles in his following ventures, before gaining critical acclaim for his portrayal of a cricket coach in Suseenthiran's Jeeva (2014). The success of the film meant that he adapted 'Jeeva' as a prefix to his name and continued to play pivotal roles as a collector in AR Murugadoss's Kaththi (2014) and a commissioner in Kaaki Sattai (2015).

== Television ==
Year	Title	Channel	Notes
2007–2008	Kana Kaanum Kaalangal	Vijay TV	
2010–2011	En Peyar Meenakshi	Vijay TV	
2011–2012	Pirivom Santhippoom	Vijay TV	
2012–2014	Merku Maambalathil Oru Kaadhal	Zee Tamil	
2012–2017	Bhairavi Aavigalukku Priyamanaval	Sun TV	
2013–2015	Office	Vijay TV	
2013–2015	Thendral	Sun TV	
2014	Mannan Magal	Jaya TV	
2015	Valli	Sun TV	Cameo appearance
2016–2017	Kakka Kakka	Raj TV	
2016–2017	Lakshmi Vandhachu	Zee Tamil	
2018	Kalyanamam Kalyanam	Star Vijay	
2018–2019	Oru Oorla Oru Rajakumari	Zee Tamil	Cameo appearance
2018–2019	Oviya	Colors Tamil	
2019	Nila	Sun TV	
2019–2020	Aayutha Ezhuthu	Star Vijay	
2019–2020	Gokulathil Seethai	Zee Tamil	
2020	Uyire	Colors Tamil	
2020	Chithi 2	Sun TV	Cameo appearance
2020–2023	Thirumagal	Sun TV	
2023–2024	Mr. Manaivi	Sun TV	
2025–present	Ayali	Zee Tamil	

Web Series

Year	Title	Network
2016	Ctrl Alt Del	YouTube
2019	Fingertip	Zee5
2024	Inspector Rishi	Amazon Prime Video

== Filmography ==
Year	Film	Role	Notes
2011	Engaeyum Eppothum	Gautam's father	
2011	Vellore Maavattam		
2011	Mouna Guru		
2012	3	Janani's father	
2012	Saattai	Staff	
2013	Vathikuchi		
2013	Nugam		
2014	Thalaivan	Police officer	
2014	Jeeva	Coach	
2014	Kaththi	Collector	
2014	Meaghamann	Anil Nair	
2015	Kaaki Sattai	Commissioner	
2015	Indru Netru Naalai	Ravishankar	
2015	Idhu Enna Maayam	Maya's father	
2016	Azhagu Kutti Chellam	Akila's father	
2016	Moondraam Ullaga Por	Ravi	
2016	Miruthan	Chief Doctor Dharan	
2016	Aagam	Sai's father	
2016	Katha Solla Porom	Magician	
2017	Si3	Mallaya	
2017	Pagadi Aattam	John	
2017	Dhayam	Personality Doctor	
2017	Katha Nayagan	Thambidurai's father	
2017	Aramm	Doctor	
2017	Maayavan	Ravikumar	
2018	Sketch	Police officer	
2018	Tik Tik Tik	Police officer	
2018	Imaikkaa Nodigal	George	Uncredited role
2019	Boomerang	Siva's father	
2019	Ninu Veedani Needanu Nene	Arjun's father	Telugu film
2019	Igloo		
2019	Pancharaaksharam	Jeevika's father	
2020	Thottu Vidum Thooram		
2020	Draupadi	Advocate	
2020	Ponmagal Vandhal	Suresh Pandiyan	
2020	Andhaghaaram	Vasanth	
2020	Oru Pakka Kathai	Saravanan's father	Released on ZEE5
2021	Calls	Nandhini's father	
2021	Thittam Irandu	Abhishek	
2021	Theerpugal Virkapadum	Aruna's husband	
2022	Maaran	Ravi	
2022	Ranga	Abinaya's father	
2022	Nenjuku Needhi	Superintendent of police	
2022	Doodi		
2023	Kannai Nambathey	Police Commissioner	
2023	Veeran	Kumaran's father	
2023	Maaveeran	Nila's father	
2023	Paayum Oli Nee Yenakku		
2023	Infinity		
2023	Nene Naa		Telugu film
2023	License	DSP	
2023	Rule Number 4	Ravi	
2023	Raid		
2023	Aathmika		
2024	Kalvan	IAS officer	Credited as R. Raveendran
2024	Vadakkupatti Ramasamy	District Collector	
2024	Siragan	Sundar	
2024	Rathnam	Malliga's uncle	
2024	Sattam En Kaiyil	Arumugam	
2025	Seesaw	Krishnamurti	
2025	Vidaamuyarchi	Kayal's father	
2025	Varunan		
2025	Asthram	James	
2025	Ten Hours	Doctor	
2025	House Mates	Karthik's MD	
2026	Happy Raj	Thenmozhi's father	
