= CSI Sanatan =

2023 Telugu film by Sivashankar Dev

- Directed by: Sivashankar Dev
- Written by: Sivashankar Dev
- Screenplay by: Chaganti Santaiah; Sivashankar Dev
- Produced by: Ajay Srinivas; Chaganti Santaiah
- Starring: Aadi Saikumar; Misha Narang; Nandini Rai; Tarak Ponnappa
- Cinematography: Ganganamoni Shekar
- Edited by: Amar Reddy
- Music by: Aneesh Solomon
- Production company: Chaganti Productions
- Release date: 10 March 2023
- Running time: 130 minutes
- Country: India
- Language: Telugu

CSI Sanatan is a 2023 Indian Telugu-language crime thriller film written and directed by debutant Sivashankar Dev and produced by Ajay Srinivas under Chaganti Productions. It stars Aadi Saikumar and Misa Narang, Nandini Rai, Tarak Ponnappa and Ali Reza in pivotal roles. The story revolves around Crime scene investigation (CSI) officer investigating a CEO's murder. The music for the film was composed by Aneesh Solomon, while the cinematography and editing were handled by Ganganamoni Shekar and Amar Reddy respectively. The film was theatrically released on 10 March 2023.

== Premise ==
Vikram Chakravarty runs a big financial firm, which seems to like helping middle classes. During a party, everyone becomes intoxicated and Vikram is murdered by an unknown assailant. Crime scene investigation (CSI) Sanatan leads the investigation with his friend Inspector Rudra. They find five prime suspects, who work together with the intent to kill Vikram. Meanwhile, another dead body is discovered in the company building. Sanatan discovers a Ponzi scheme run by Vikram with Minister.

== Cast ==
- Aadi Saikumar as Sanatan
- Misha Narang as Sudeeksha, Company auditor and Sanatan's ex-lover
- Nandini Rai as Divya
- Tarak Ponnappa as Vikram Chakravarty
- Ali Reza as Inspector Rudra, Sanatan's friend
- Madhusudhan as Minister Rajvardhan
- Ravi Prakash as ACP Shankar, Sanatan's brother-in-law
- Khayyum as Muhammed Saleem Baig, Company senior auditor
- Vasanti Krishnan as Lasya
- Ali Farahnakian as Home Minister
- Chaganti Santaiah

== Soundtrack ==
CSI Sanatan

Soundtrack album by Aneesh Solomon
- Released: 2023
- Recorded: 2022
- Genre: Feature film soundtrack
- Length: 11:11
- Language: Telugu
- Label: Aditya Music
- Producer: Aneesh Solomon
External audio
- CSI Sanatan - Full Songs Jukebox on YouTube

The film score and soundtrack is composed by Aneesh Solomon.The music distribution rights were acquired by Aditya Music.

Track listing
No.	Title	Lyrics	Singer(s)	Length
1.	"Senorita"	Pothula Ravikiran	Yazin Nizar	4:57
2.	"Title Song"	Aniruddha Sastry	Aniruddha Sastry	3:13
3.	"Tonight (Party Song)"	Maria Roe Vincent	Maria Roe Vincent	3:31
Total length:				11:11

== Release ==
The movie released on 10 March 2023 in more than 300 theaters worldwide.

== Reception ==
CSI Sanatan received mixed reviews from critics and audience.

ABP Live Telugu gave the film 2.5 out of 5 stars and stated, "CSI Sanathan' is a passable thriller. If you go to the theatre without any expectations, you can pass the time. Aadi Sai Kumar has once again come to the audience with a good concept-based movie.

Avad Mohammad of OTTplay gave it 2.5 out of 5 stars and wrote,"CSI Sanatan is a murder mystery that has a familiar premise with a few decent twists and turns that director Shivashanker Dev has created. The manner in which he executes the investigation scenes forms the main crux of the film. The few twists that are showcased create decent excitement for the audience and give this film an edge.
