= Yaarra Andha Paiyan Naan Dhan Andha Paiyan =

- Theatrical release poster
- Directed by: Paulraj
- Written by: Paulraj
- Produced by: Paulraj
- Starring: Paulraj; Gayatri Rema; Swetha Sree; Ravi Mariya; Pasanga Sivakumar; Ambani Shankar
- Cinematography: Udayan
- Edited by: K. Shankar
- Music by: Vijay Prabhu
- Production company: P. R. Productions
- Release date: 6 March 2026
- Country: India
- Language: Tamil

Yaarra Andha Paiyan Naan Dhan Andha Paiyan (transl. Who is that boy? I am that boy) is a 2026 Indian Tamil-language crime comedy film written, directed, and produced by Paulraj. The film is produced under the banner P. R. Productions and also distributed by the same company. It stars Paulraj, Gayatri Rema, Swetha Sree, Ravi Mariya, Pasanga Sivakumar, and Ambani Shankar in prominent roles. The film was theatrically released on 6 March 2026, and was not a box office success. Its title is based on a lyric from Asal Kolaar's song "Paiya Dei".

== Cast ==
- Paulraj
- Gayatri Rema
- Swetha Sree
- Ravi Mariya
- Pasanga Sivakumar
- Ambani Shankar
- Aadukalam Naren

== Reception ==
Virakesari wrote that Udhayan's cinematography and Vijay Prabhu's background score clearly reflect that this film was made on a low budget. The reviewer concluded that Yaarra Andha Paiyan Naan Dhaan Andha Paiyan is an audacious effort by newcomers. Maalai Malar wrote that director Balraj has directed the film focusing on family relationships, love and human emotions. The reviewer added that in this story that revolves around love triangles, the film would have been more interesting if there had been more strong moments in the screenplay. Kalki Online gave the film a 2.5/5 rating.
