= Divya Sathyaraj =

IT wing deputy secretary for Dravida Munnetra Kazhagam

- Divya in 2014

Deputy Secretary of IT wing for DMK
- In office 17 February 2025 – 9 May 2026
- Chief Minister: M. K. Stalin

Personal details
- Born: Divya Sathyaraj; 24 October 1985 (age 41) Chennai, Tamil Nadu, India
- Party: Dravida Munnetra Kazhagam
- Education: Master of Philosophy
- Alma mater: University of Madras
- Occupation: Politician Nutritionist

Divya Sathyaraj is an Indian nutrionist and politician who served as the IT wing deputy secretary for the Dravida Munnetra Kazhagam from 2025 till 2026. She is the daughter of actor Sathyaraj and the sister of Sibi Sathyaraj. Divya is the goodwill ambassador of The Akshaya Patra Foundation (TAPF), an NGO implementing the Government of India’s Midday Meal Scheme for school children. She has also started a movement in 2020, Mahilmadhi Iyakkam, an initiative to provide healthy and nutritious meals to the malnourished and under-privileged communities.

== Personal life ==
Divya is the daughter of actor Sathyaraj and Maheshwari. Her brother is the actor Sibi. Unlike her father and her brother, Divya abstained from acting, instead pursuing a career in nutrition. Originally a vegetarian, she became a vegan in 2016.

== Career ==
Divya graduated with a Master of Philosophy in Nutrition from the University of Madras. She conducts workshops on health-related issues, child labour and self-defence for women, and counseling sessions for Sri Lankan refugees. She had written a letter to the Prime Minister of India, Narendra Modi, pointing out the malpractices and negligence in medical field and questioning the NEET exams. She is the goodwill ambassador of Akshaya Patra Foundation, the world's largest midday meal programme. She has also partnered with World Vision India, where she has assumed responsibility for four young girls.

Divya started a movement in 2020, Mahilmadhi Iyakkam. About the movement she says, "The purpose of the movement is to identify areas in the city where access to nutritious food and awareness about its benefits are lacking. Once the areas are identified and the community members are assessed, those in the neighbourhood who are in need, will be provided hygienic and healthy food, free of cost, based on the deficiencies." In 2019, Divya announced she would get into politics in 2021.

Divya joined the Dravida Munnetra Kazhagam (DMK) on 19 January 2025 in the presence of the then Chief Minister of Tamil Nadu, M. K. Stalin, at the party headquarters Anna Arivalayam in Chennai.

== Awards ==
In 2019, Divya received the Women Achiever Award for excellence in community service from Raindrops, a youth-based social organisation spreading social awareness through media and entertainment. In 2020, she was awarded an honorary doctorate by the International Tamil University, USA, in recognition for her contributions in the field of Nutritional therapy.
