= Ekta Chowdhry =

Indian model

Ekta Chowdhry Yadav
- Born: 31 March 1986 (age 40); New Delhi, India
- Height: 1.79 m (5 ft 10 1/2 in)
- Beauty pageant titleholder
- Title: Femina Miss India Universe 2009
- Hair color: Black
- Eye color: Brown
- Major competition: Miss Universe 2009

Ekta Chowdhry Yadav is an Indian model and beauty pageant titleholder who the winner of Femina Miss India Universe 2009 title. She is the grand daughter of Delhi's first chief minister Chaudhary Brahm Prakash Yadav.

== Femina Miss India Universe ==
Chowdhry was crowned the winner of the Femina Miss India Universe title on 5 April 2009 at the Andheri Sports Complex in Mumbai.

== Miss Universe 2009 ==
Chowdhry represented India at the Miss Universe 2009 competition on 23 August 2009 in Nassau, Bahamas but failed to make the final cut as one of the top 15 contestants. She has returned to India to continue her journey as Miss India Universe.

Awards and achievements
Preceded by Simran Kaur Mundi	Miss Universe India; 2009	Succeeded by Ushoshi Sengupta as I Am She
Preceded by Simran Kaur Mundi	Femina Miss India Universe; 2009	Last
