= Kalairani =

Indian actress

- Born: 9 July
- Occupation: Actress
- Years active: 1987 – present

Kalairani (9 July) is an Indian actress in the Tamil film industry. She has graced the stage as a performer in dramas like Koothu-P-Pattarai.

== Career ==
After her passion for acting, Kalairani did acting coaching at the Adyar Film Institute and later joined the Contemporary Theatre Group Koothu-P-Pattarai.

She began her cinematic journey in 1987 with an uncredited appearance in Ninaikka Therintha Maname and showcased her versatile acting through roles such as a village woman in the 1997 film Devathai and Pugazh's mother in the 1999 hit Mudhalvan. Expanding into Telugu cinema, she famously portrayed Nagarjuna's mother in the blockbuster 2000 film Azad. Her career reached another milestone in 2005 when her remarkable performance in the Tamil film Kodambakkam.She had a distinguished body of work across both films and television serials.

Kalairani's experience goes beyond acting, she has been instrumental in nurturing and training newcomers in the industry.

== Awards ==
Year	Award	Category	Film	Result	Ref.
2005	Tamil Nadu State Film Award	Best Character Artiste (Female)	Kodambakkam	Won	

== Filmography ==
=== Tamil films ===
Year	Film	Role	Notes
1987	Ninaikka Therintha Maname	Person at railway station	Uncredited role
1987	Kani Nilam		
1992	Ermunai		
1996	Karuvelam Pookkal		
1997	Devathai	Village woman	
1999	Mudhalvan	Pugazh's mother	
2000	Alai Payuthey		
2000	Ennavalle	Lakshmi's mother	
2001	Nila Kaalam		Television film
2001	Dhill	Kanagavel's mother	
2001	Dum Dum Dum	Adhi's mother	
2001	Kutty	Kanagavel's mother	
2002	Youth	Aruna's mother	
2002	Ramanaa	ACF member's mother	
2002	Bala	Bala's mother	
2003	Anbe Sivam	Grieving mother	
2003	Dhool	Arumugam's mother	
2003	Pudhiya Geethai	Sarathi's mother	
2003	Boys	Kumar's mother	
2003	Anjaneya	Paramaguru's neighbour	
2003	Enakku 20 Unakku 18	Sridhar's mother	
2004	Campus	A student's mother	
2004	Perazhagan	Karthik's mother	
2004	Shock	Maid	
2004	Bose	Bose's mother	
2005	Adhu Oru Kana Kaalam	Sathya	
2005	Kundakka Mandakka	Illango's mother	
2005	Kodambakkam	Sugavannan's mother	Tamil Nadu State Film Award for Best Female Character Artiste
2006	Sudesi	Kamala	
2006	Nenjirukkum Varai	Ganesh's mother	
2007	Machakaaran	Vicky's Aunt	
2007	Marudhamalai	Marudhamalai's mother	
2007	Thavam		
2008	Azhagu Nilayam	Indrani	
2009	Ayan		
2009	Ananda Thandavam		
2009	Vettaikaaran	Civilian	
2010	Anandhapurathu Veedu	Mayilamma	
2010	Vallakottai	Bala's mother	
2010	Virudhagiri	Virudhagiri's mother	
2011	Mambattiyan	Village Doctor	
2012	Ambuli	Seemati	
2012	Mudhal Idam	Mahesh's mother	
2012	Maasi	Maasilamani's mother	
2013	Kadal	Mother Superior	
2013	Chithirayil Nilachoru	Shop Owner	
2014	Veeram		
2014	Oru Oorla Rendu Raja	Valarmathy's grandmother	
2015	Vedalam	Victim's mother	
2016	Kida Poosari Magudi		
2016	Manithan	Judge	
2016	Jumbulingam 3D		
2018	Abhiyum Anuvum	Kamatchi	
2018	Thamizh Padam 2	Shiva's grandmother	
2018	Johnny	Shiva's mother	
2019	Viswasam	Pechiammal	
2022	Achcham Madam Naanam Payirppu	Window aunty	
2022	Hostel		
2022	Ward 126		
2023	The Great Indian Kitchen	Aunt	
2023	Bagheera		
2023	Ghosty	Robert's owner	
2023	Are You Ok Baby?	Balachandhran's mother	
2023	Raththam		
2023	80s Buildup	Kathir’s grandmother	
2024	Aaragan		
2024	Kanguva	Villager	
2026	Retta Thala	Anthre's grandmother	

=== Telugu films ===
Year	Film	Role
2000	Azad	Azad's mother
2003	Tagore	ACF member's mother
2003	Nee Manasu Naaku Telusu	Sridhar's mother

== Serials ==
- Panchavan Kaadu (2014)
- Unarchigal (2014)
- Nandini (2018)
- The Village (2023)
- Inspector Rishi (2024)
