= Pei Irukka Bayamen =

2021 Indian film

- Film poster
- Directed by: S. Kaarthieswaran
- Starring: S. Kaarthieswaran; Gayatri Rema
- Cinematography: Abhimanyu
- Edited by: G.P. Karthik Raja
- Music by: Jose Franklin
- Production company: Thilaka Arts
- Release date: 1 January 2021
- Running time: 160 minutes
- Country: India
- Language: Tamil

Pei Irukka Bayamen (transl. No fear if the ghost is here) is a 2021 Tamil language horror comedy film directed by S. Kaarthieswaran and starring S. Kaarthieswaran and Gayatri Rema in the lead roles. Produced by Thilaka Arts, it was released on 1 January 2021.

== Plot ==
A newlywed couple moves to a bungalow, arguing. They hate each other and refuse to talk to each other. At midnight, two ghosts arrive and terrorize the couple. They quickly call in multiple saamis to ensure their safety. When none of them work, they resort to YouTube and find out that they should not fear ghosts. They then make the ghosts their friends, and then the ghosts agree that they should help the couple resolve their problems. The problem between the couple is resolved, and they happily move out of the house.

== Cast ==
- S. Kaarthieswaran
- Gayatri Rema
- Kothai Santhanam
- M. R. Arjun
- Niyathi
- Abiram
- Muthukaalai
- Nellai Siva

== Production ==
The film was shot in and around the Kerala and Tamil Nadu border. A huge house near Maraiyur was used to shoot.

== Release ==
The film was released theatrically across Tamil Nadu on 1 January 2021. A critic from Times of India called the film "an easily forgettable snooze fest", adding it had a "lack of an interesting screenplay, thrills and comedy". A review from Maalai Malar also suggested that the film lacked thrills. A critic from NewsTodayNet noted "had the script written better, the end product could gave been more engrossing".
