= Gingee (film) =

2022 Tamil language drama film

- Promotional poster
- Directed by: Ganesh Chandrasekhar
- Produced by: Ganesh Chandrasekhar
- Starring: Ganesh Chandrasekhar; Ksenya Panferova; Yogiram; Sree Ramya
- Cinematography: Harish Jinde
- Edited by: Ananth
- Music by: L. V. Muthu Ganesh
- Release date: 18 November 2022
- Running time: 110 minutes
- Country: India
- Language: Tamil

Gingee is a 2022 Indian Tamil-language drama film directed and produced by Ganesh Chandrasekhar. He stars in the lead role alongside Ksenya Panferova, Yogiram and Sree Ramya. It was released on 18 November 2022.

== Cast ==
- Ganesh Chandrasekhar as Jack
- Ksenya Panferova as Sofia
- Yogiram
- Sree Ramya as Aishwarya
- Shyju Kallara
- Sujatha Doraimanickam
- Dheekshanya
- Sai Srinivasan
- Vidhesh Anand
- Sanjay
- Darshan Kumar

== Production ==
The film's team held a music launch event in July 2022.

== Reception ==
The film was released on 18 November 2022 across Tamil Nadu. A critic from Maalai Malar criticised the film's staging. A reviewer from Dina Thanthi suggested that the film looked "amateur", while the critic from Dina Malar also gave the film a negative review.
