= Akku (2023 film) =

Indian crime thriller horror film

- Official poster
- Directed by: Stalin V
- Written by: Stalin V
- Produced by: Pon. Selvaraj
- Starring: Prajin; Paruthiveeran Venkatesh; Gayatri Rema
- Cinematography: Devasurya
- Edited by: Aravinthan Arumugam
- Music by: Sathish Selvam
- Production company: Ambigapathy Movie Makers
- Distributed by: Uthraa Production
- Release date: 13 October 2023
- Country: India
- Language: Tamil

Akku is a 2023 Indian Tamil-language crime thriller & horror film directed by Stalin V and produced by Pon.Selvaraj. The film stars Prajin and Gayatri Rema, with Paruthiveeran Venkatesh, Stalin V, Gobar and Ramanathan Narayanan in supporting roles. The film's music is composed by Sathish Selvam, while the cinematography is handled by Devasurya and editing is by Aravinthan Arumugam.

== Cast ==
- Prajin as Harish
- Paruthiveeran Venkatesh as Inspector Venkat
- Gayatri Rema as Swetha
- Stalin V as Rudhran
- Ramanathan Narayanan as Psychiatrist Dr.Gunaseelan
- Kpy Sarath as Bala
- Kpy Vinoth as Vinoth
- Naira Nihar as SI Mithra
- Jai Akash

== Production ==
The film marked the debut for the director Stalin V. Principal photography of the film was shot in Chennai, East Coast Road, OMR. Some portion of the film was shot in Theni, India.

== Reception ==
A critic from Thinaboomi wrote that "Prajan, who comes as a film editor, has given a fantastic performance". Maalai Malar critic noted that "Prajin, who is playing the hero in the film, has done his job well."
