= Ree (film) =

2022 Tamil language feature film

- ரீ
- Directed by: Sundharavadivel
- Written by: Sundharavadivel
- Starring: Prasanth Srinivasan; Gayatri Rema; Prasath
- Cinematography: DhineshSrinivaas
- Edited by: K. Srinivas
- Music by: Score: Spurgen Paul; Songs: Hariji
- Production company: Srianga Productions
- Release date: 7 October 2022
- Running time: 1 hour 49 minutes
- Country: India
- Language: Tamil

Ree is a 2022 Indian Tamil-language feature film directed by Sundharavadivel and starring Prasanth Srinivasan, Gayatri Rema and Prasath. It was released on October 7, 2022.

== Plot ==
Reema is a girl who longs to help others, and who is very keen helping neighbours in their homes. As a result she is seen as meddling. Due to this, Reema happens to be a murder suspect for acquaintance to a husband and wife, who quarrel next door, resulting in the wife’s murder at the hands of her husband. Reema's attitude towards her neighbours is not changed even after this tedious incident.

Because of the situation, Reema with her psychiatrist husband Mugil relocate to a new house on the outskirts of the city. To her surprise, a strange noise emanates from next door neighbours of this new house too. At first Reema thinks the house is a haunted, and she asks Mugil if they can sell their new house and to move elsewhere. Later she finds out that next door is not a haunted house, but a heart surgeon Sagul, resides there with his wife Mumtaj and daughter Fatima.

Nevertheless, the strange sound continues to emanate from next door, so that Reema believes someone other than Sagul's family reside in their house. The more she digs, the more trouble she brings upon herself, including a murderous attack from the mysterious man next door. Reema with her police brother go to fight with Sagul's family. They argue as there is no one else in their home but themselves, which creates suspicion of Reema's mental stability. Mugil also admits to Sagul that Reema is not mentally stable enough, and Sagul agrees to help Mugil to cure Reema.

== Cast ==
- Prasanth Srinivasan as Mugil
- Gayatri Rema as Reema
- Prasath as Sagul
- Sangeetha Paul as Mumtaj
- Baby Oviya as Fatima
- Sundharavadivel as Johnson

== Production ==
Gayatri Rema and Prashanth Srinivasan were cast in the lead roles.

== Soundtrack ==
Ree has two songs composed by music director Hariji, who composed for TV serials like 'Vamsam', 'Selvi', 'Vani Rani' and 'Solla Marantha Kathai'

No.	Title	Singers	Lyricists
1.	Nenjin Oramai	Sarath Santosh Hemambiga	Thozhan
2.	Unna Vida Enaku	Selvanambi Sanmitha Palani Hemambiga	Selvanambi

== Reception ==
The film was released in theatres on 7 October 2022 across Tamil Nadu and gained a mediocre review. The Deccan Chronicle daily gave 2.75 out of 5 with a comment "had there been a bigger star cast, the potential script like Ree, may have had a greater impact".
