= Ward 126 =

- Directed by: Selvakumar Chellapandian
- Written by: Selvakumar Chellapandian
- Starring: Michael Thangadurai; Jishnu Menon; Shritha Shivadas; Vidya Pradeep; Chandini Tamilarasan; Shruthi Ramakrishnan
- Cinematography: SK SureshKumar
- Edited by: Thiyagu
- Music by: Varun Sunil
- Production company: SSB Talkies
- Distributed by: Action Reaction Films
- Release date: 22 July 2022
- Country: India
- Language: Tamil

Ward 126 is a 2022 Indian Tamil-language romantic investigative thriller film written and directed by Selvakumar Chellapandian. The film was under Production House ssb talkies. The film stars Michael Thangadurai, Jishnu Menon, Shritha Sivadas, Vidya Pradeep, Chandini Tamilarasan, Shruthi Ramakrishnan. The film's music is composed by Varun Sunil with cinematography handled by SK Suresh Kumar and editing done by Thiyagu. The film was released in theatres on 22 July 2022.

== Plot ==
The film opens with the cold-blooded murder of an IT professional named Gokul (also called Krishna / Kannan) in Chennai. Investigators probing the case uncover that Gokul led a secretive personal life, including multiple marital relationships.

Halfway through the film, the focus shifts to Rossie (played by Shritha Sivadas), a pregnant woman who becomes involved through a chain-snatching incident that occurred in the same lane as Gokul's crime. Her life becomes intertwined with Gokul's and the investigation's darker threads.

The narrative is non-linear, interleaving present investigations with flashbacks, gradually revealing connections among Gokul (or “Kannan”), Rossie, other characters (including his wives or partners), and the darker side of life in the IT/BPO world.

Among the themes are: harassment faced by women working in or connected to the IT/BPO industry; moral decay, betrayal; and how one death can expose many hidden lives. The climax/ending has a twist—some relationships or events are not what they initially seem.

== Cast ==
- Michael Thangadurai as Gokul / Krishna / Kannan
- Jishnu Menon as Jagadeesh
- Selvakumar Chellapandiyan as Shenbagaraj
- Shritha Sivadas as Roseline "Rosy" Maria
- Chandini Tamilarasan as Vidhya
- Vidya Pradeep as Yamini
- Shruthi Ramakrishnan as Swapna
- Sonia Agarwal as Jyothisri
- Sriman as Kannan's neighbour
- Kalairani as Kannan's neighbour
- Deepa Shankar as Kannan's neighbour
- Vinod Sagar
- R. Amarendran
- Aadhira Pandilakshmi
- Umadevi
- Nishanth

== Production ==
On 25 December 2020 Jayam Ravi unveiled the first look poster. The film was shot in Chennai, Bangalore, and Noida, and the songs were shot in Pondicherry.

== Music ==
The film's soundtrack was composed by Varun Sunil. while lyrics are written by Uma Devi.

Track listing
| No. | Title | Lyrics | Singer(s) | Length |
|---|---|---|---|---|
| 1. | "Kaalam Azhagaai" | Uma Devi | KS Harisankar, Shweta Mohan | 3:33 |
| 2. | "Vazhi Nadathidum" | Uma Devi | Varun Sunil, Sunitha Sarathy, Senthuzhan | 5:11 |
| 3. | "Nee Vithaitha" | Sai Selva | Aslam Abdul Majeed & Varun Sunil | 1:56 |

== Release ==
The film had a theatrical release on 22 July 2022. A critic from The Times of India noted that "Overall, Ward 126 is a decent watch and is engaging in parts". A reviewer from Thanthi TV gave the film a middling review. Film critic Malini Mannath wrote "Ward 126 is a promising effort from a maker, who is partly successful in his attempt to strike away from the formulaic scenario, both in terms of writing and narrative style".
