= Michael Thangadurai =

Indian actor and dancer (born 1983)

- Born: 23 August 1983 (age 42); Coimbatore, Tamil Nadu, India
- Occupations: actor, dancer
- Years active: 2008 — present
- Spouse: Vandana (2011-present)

Michael Thangadurai (born 23 August 1983) is an Indian actor and dancer, who works in Tamil films and television.

== Career ==
Michael made his acting debut in the youth based soap opera Kana Kaanum Kaalangal in Star Vijay. He was the winner of the reality dance show Jodi Number One in Season 4 along with Hemalatha. He acted in the film Kanimozhi and later a got a breakthrough with the male lead role in the film Nalanum Nandhiniyum. He shot for a film Pathungi Paayanum Thala, which is yet to release.

== Filmography ==
Films

Year	Film	Role	Notes
2010	Kanimozhi	Michael	
2014	Nalanum Nandhiniyum	Nalan	
2014	Burma	Paramanandan	
2021	Oomai Sennaai	Prabhakar	
2022	Ward 126	Kannan	
2023	N4	Surya	
2023	Saba Nayagan	Inspector Vishnu	
2024	Aaragan	Saravanan	
2025	Bun Butter Jam	Saravanan Paranthaman	
2025	Stephen	Michael	

Television

Show	Role	Channel
Kana Kaanum Kaalangal	Michael Varadharaj	STAR Vijay
Boys vs Girls	Contestant	STAR Vijay
Jodi Number One Season 4	Contestant	STAR Vijay
