= Not Reachable =

- Theatrical release poster
- Directed by: Chandru Muruganantham
- Written by: Chandru Muruganantham
- Starring: Vishwa; Sai Dhanya; Vijayan
- Cinematography: Sukumaran Sundar
- Edited by: Chandru Muruganantham
- Music by: Charan Kumar
- Production company: Crackbrain Productions
- Release date: 9 September 2022
- Country: India
- Language: Tamil

Not Reachable is a 2022 Indian Tamil-language crime thriller film directed by Chandru Muruganantham and written by Chandru Muruganantham . The film was under Production House Crackbrain Productions. The film stars Vishwa with Sai Dhanya, Vijayan, Subha Devaraj and Birla Bose in supporting roles. The film was released in theatres on 9 September 2022. The film done under low budget, even though in terms of technical aspects sounds good.

== Cast ==
- Vishwa - Vishwa
- Sai Dhanya - Hema
- Vijayan - Raghu
- Subha Devaraj - Kayal
- Kadhal Saravanan - Kalyanam
- Birla Bose - Kumaravel

== Release ==
The film had a theatrical release on 9 September 2022. A critic from Maalai Malar gave the film a mixed review. and a critic from Dina Thanthi also gave the film a mixed review.
