= Senthil Ganesh =

Indian folk, playback singer and actor (born 1984)

- Born: 1983 (age 42–43); Karambakkudi, Pudukkottai, Tamil Nadu, India
- Genres: Playback singing, Devotional songs
- Occupations: Singer
- Spouse: Rajalakshmi Senthil

Senthil Ganesh is an Indian playback singer and actor. He rose to prominence after winning the reality show, Super Singer 6, in 2018 which was aired in Star Vijay. He made his acting debut with the film Thirudu Pogatha Manasu (2014).

== Early life ==
Senthil Ganesh pursued his interest in folk music Naattupurapaattu at the age of five and started recording songs after learning the basics of the music. He learnt music from Chella Thangaiah and recorded his first song Mannuketha Raagangal at the age of 10. He completed his primary and secondary education at a school in Alangudi, Pudukkottai and pursued his higher education at a musical college in Trichy. He has also conducted over 100 folk music concerts and has performed in many local cultural religious functions. Senthil also received the Doctor of Letters for Tamil Literature.

== Career ==
In 2014, Senthil Ganesh was roped into play a lead role in the film Thirudu Pogatha Manasu by his music guru turned director Chella Thangaiah, and the film marked Senthil's acting debut.

He then took part in Super Singer 6 along with his wife as one of 22 contestants in the season and became popular in the show for singing mostly folk songs. He emerged as the winner of the contest, while his wife Rajalakshmi received a consolation prize. After taking part in the contest, he received film opportunities and collaborated with director Chella Thangaiah for the second time and played the lead role in Karimugan (2018). It was initially reported that Senthil Ganesh would make his playback singing debut after being approached by music director D. Imman with the film Seema Raja in 2018.

However, both Senthil Ganesh and Rajalakshmi made their playback singing debuts together in early 2018, and both rose to prominence after crooning the sleeper hit song Chinna Machan for the film Charlie Chaplin 2. He collaborated with another folk singer Rockstar Ramani Ammal and crooned the song Siriki for the film Kaappaan, which became popular among rural people.

He also appeared in the reality television show Mr and Mrs Chinnathirai with his wife in 2019.

== Personal life ==
Senthil Ganesh married fellow folk singer Rajalakshmi in 2012. In 2019, they spoke critically about Indian Prime Minister Narendra Modi on social media.

== Filmography ==
- Thirudu Pogatha Manasu (2014)
- Karimugan (2018)

== Discography ==
Year	Song title	Film name	Music director	Notes
2018	"Paraak Paraak"	Seema Raja	D. Imman	
2019	'"Danga Danga"	Viswasam	D. Imman	
2019	"Chinna Machan"	Charlie Chaplin 2	Amresh Ganesh	
2019	"Onnukku Renda"	Vantha Rajavathaan Varuven	Hiphop Tamizha	
2019	'"Pudalangai'"	Mosadi	Shajahan	
2019	'"Siriki'"	Kaappaan	Harris Jayaraj	
2019	"Nilla Kallula"	En Kaadhali Scene Podura	Amresh Ganesh	
2019	"Iruchi"	Irandam Ulagaporin Kadaisi Gundu	Tenma	
2020	"Pudhu Vidiyal"	Pattas	Vivek-Mervin	
2020	"Kannaana Kannukulla"	Galtha	AJ Alimirsaq	
2020	"Mannurunda"	Soorarai Pottru	G. V. Prakash Kumar	
2021	"Konda Mela"	Namma Oorukku Ennadhan Achu	Srikanth Deva	
2021	"Hey Enna Vachi"	Pei Mama	Raj Aryan	
2022	"Nalla Irumma"	DSP	D. Imman	
2023	"Nanga Pudhusa Kattikitta Jodi"	Irumban	Srikanth Deva	
2023	"Pattuvaetti Santhanam"	Deiva Machan	Godwin J. Kodan	
2023	"Andome Kidukidunga"	Veeran	Hiphop Tamizha	
2023	"Ooru Ellam Maavolai"	Kathar Basha Endra Muthuramalingam	G. V. Prakash Kumar	
2024	"Adanga Sirikki"	Singappenney	Kumaran Sivamani	Also lyricist
2024	"Peelings"	Pushpa 2: The Rule	Devi Sri Prasad	Dubbed version
