= Doodi =

2022 Tamil language drama film

- Directed by: Karthik Madhusoodhan
- Starring: Karthik Madhusoodhan; Shritha Sivadas; Edwin Raj
- Cinematography: Madhan Sundarraj
- Edited by: Sam RDX
- Music by: K. C. Balasarangan
- Production company: Connecting Dots Productions
- Release date: 16 September 2022
- Running time: 122 minutes
- Country: India
- Language: Tamil

Doodi is a 2022 Indian Tamil-language drama film directed by Karthik Madhusudhan, featuring him, Shritha Sivadas and Sana Shalini in lead roles. It's his debut direction and acting film which he wrote the story Screen play and dialogues. Music was composed by Balasarangan, Edited by Sam RDX. It was released on 16 September 2022. critics and audience gave the film 3-3.5 stars. Direction and acting was appreciated by the audience saying a bold attempt for a complicated story line which deals with emotions and desires which a girl and guy goes through in relationship.

== Cast ==
- Karthik Madhusudhan
- Shritha Sivadas
- Edwin Raj
- Sana Shalini
- Jeeva Ravi
- Nitin Thomas
- Sriranjini
- GV Madhusudhan
- Uthara
- Arjun Manikandan
- Akshatha

== Reception ==
The film was released on 16 September 2022 across Tamil Nadu. A critic from Maalai Malar gave the film a mixed review, and marking it 3.5 out of 5 stars. A reviewer from Dina Thanthi reviewed saying Karthik "boldly manages to say that love changes with age and maturity" which today's generation experiences in day today's life.
