= Shritha Sivadas =

Indian actress and television presenter

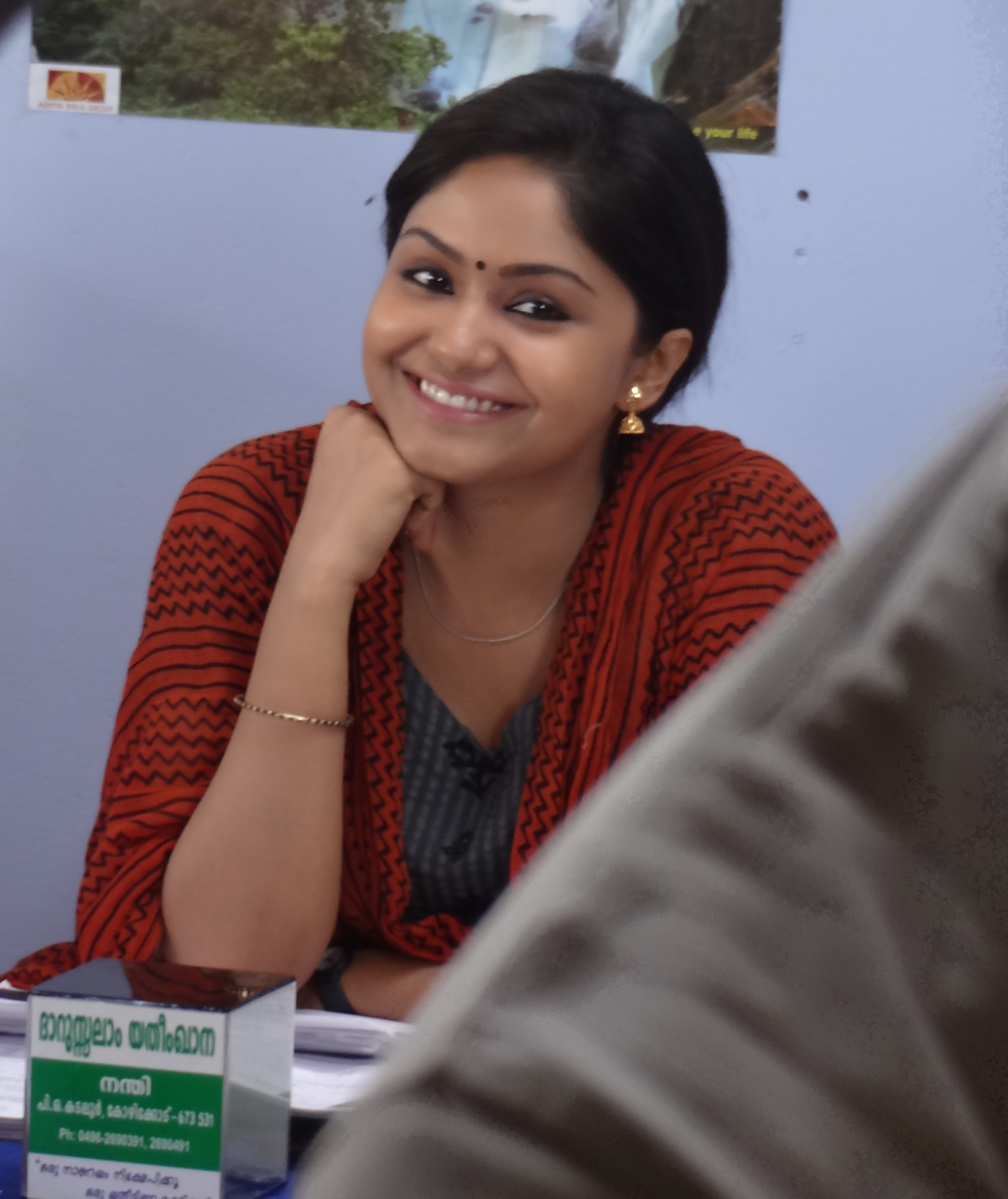
- Shritha in 2013
- Born: Parvathy Sivadas; Aluva, Kerala, India
- Other name: Paaru
- Education: Sree Sankara College, Kalady
- Occupations: Actress; television presenter
- Years active: 2012–present
- Parents: Sivadas (father); Uma (mother)

Shritha Sivadas is an actress and television presenter who works in Malayalam and Tamil-language films. She made her debut in Sugeeth's Ordinary (2012). After long back she made a comeback through Dhilluku Dhuddu 2 in 2019.

== Personal life ==
Shritha was born as Parvathy to Shivadas and Uma. She hails from Uliyannoor in Aluva, Kerala, and graduated in Microbiology from the Sree Sankara College.

== Career ==
Shritha started her career as an anchor for the programme named Dew Drops in Kairali, and went on to anchor Kairali TV's Tharolsavam. Sugeeth's Ordinary (2012) marked her acting debut, after which she was referred to as the "Gavi Girl" by the audience and in the media. She was then seen in a guest role in a song sequence with Asif Ali in Scene Onnu Nammude Veedu. In the suspense thriller 10:30 am Local Call she played a girl called Nimmi. Her next release was Money Back Policy, directed by Jayaraj Vijay. March 2013, Shritha stated that she had decided to move on to the Tamil film industry, citing: "Honestly, I am not happy with the roles that are offered here (Malayalam)". Despite that statement, she signed several films in Malayalams including Hangover, Rasputin Weeping Boy, Koothara and Onnum Mindathe.

== Filmography ==
Year	Film	Role	Language	Notes
2012	Ordinary	Kalyani	Malayalam	Nominated—SIIMA Award for Best Female Debutant
2012	Scene Onnu Nammude Veedu	Parvathy	Malayalam	Guest role in a song sequence
2013	10:30 am Local Call	Nimmy	Malayalam	
2013	Weeping Boy	Geethu	Malayalam	
2013	Money Back Policy	Girl in bus	Malayalam	Cameo appearance
2014	Hangover	Sanjana	Malayalam	
2014	Koothara	Shilpa	Malayalam	
2014	Onnum Mindathe		Malayalam	
2015	Rasputin	Anuyuktha	Malayalam	
2016	Dum	Sherin	Malayalam	
2019	Dhilluku Dhuddu 2	Maya	Tamil	
2020	Maniyarayile Ashokan	Anju	Malayalam	Cameo appearance
2021	Sunny	Aditi	Malayalam	
2021	Kural		Tamil	
2022	Astakarmma	Divya	Tamil	
2022	Ward 126	Roseline Maria	Tamil	
2022	Doodi		Tamil	

== Television ==
Year	Title	Role	Language	Channel
2009	Dew Drops	Anchor	Malayalam	Kairali TV
2010	Tharolsavam	Anchor	Malayalam	Kairali TV
2015	Smart Show		Malayalam	Flowers TV channel
2017	Grand Magical Circus	Host	Malayalam	Amrita TV
2021–2022	Enga Veetu Meenakshi	Meenakshi	Tamil	Colors Tamil
2022	Joker Poker	Contestant	Tamil	Zee Tamil
2024–2025	Veetuku Veedu Vaasapadi	Parvathi	Tamil	Star Vijay
