= Nedu Neer =

2022 Tamil language drama film

- Theatrical release poster
- Directed by: K. K. Padmanabhan
- Written by: K. K. Padmanaban
- Produced by: V. S. Palayam; S. Krishnamoorthy and K. K. Padmanaban
- Starring: Raj Krish; Indhuja; Sathya Murugan
- Cinematography: Lenin Chandrasekaran
- Edited by: MSR.RAJAVEL
- Music by: Hitesh Murugavel
- Production company: Kavin Creators
- Distributed by: Kavin Creators
- Release date: 23 December 2022
- Running time: 119 mins 57 sec
- Country: India
- Language: Tamil

Nedu Neer (transl. Water) is a 2022 Indian Tamil-language action drama film directed by K. K.Padmanabhan and starring Raj Krish, Indhuja and Sathya Murugan in the lead roles. It was released on 23 December 2022.

== Cast ==
- Raj Krish
- Indhuja
- Sathya Murugan
- S. K. Minnalraja
- Madurai Mohan

== Production ==
The first look of the film was released at an event in November 2020 attended by chief guest, Jaguar Thangam.

== plot ==
Story is starting with a teenage boy and a girl where the situation force them to leave their home. Without any thought of where to go? and how to go?, Those kids started their journey On a highway road at the midnight the kids got separated without their will. After eight years... They meet under a completely opposite direction of their life paths, where the girl is now a woman and a medical assistant for an emergency ambulance arrived for saving a life and the boy is a man and a prime rowdy for a local don arrived for killing the life...

What happens next!.......

== Reception ==
The film was released on 23 December 2022 across Tamil Nadu. A reviewer from the Madurai-based Thinaboomi newspaper gave the film a positive review, though cited that "it was a quiet, pleasant watch". A reviewer from Dina Thanthi noted that the director had created a good film. Critic Malini Mannath noted it was "Nedu Neer is a promising piece of work from a debutant maker and his team of freshers."
