= Ranga (2022 film) =

- Directed by: Vinod DL
- Story by: Vinod DL
- Produced by: Vijay K Celliah
- Starring: Sibiraj; Nikhila Vimal; Sathish; Mohnish Raheja
- Cinematography: Arvi
- Edited by: Ruben
- Music by: Ramjeevan
- Production company: Boss Movies
- Release date: 13 May 2022
- Running time: 105 minutes
- Country: India
- Language: Tamil

Ranga is a 2022 Tamil language survival thriller film directed by Vinod, starring Sibi Sathyaraj, Nikhila Vimal and Sathish in the leading roles.

== Plot ==
Adithya (Sibiraj), suffering from a unique syndrome, falls in love with Abhinaya (Nikhila Vimal) and marries her. While on their honeymoon in Manali, their lives take a turn. Stuck in the cold place, will they fight to survive?

== Cast ==
- Sibiraj as Adithya
- Nikhila Vimal as Abinaya
- Sathish as Adithyaa's friend
- Mohnish Raheja as Gabbar
- Jeeva Ravi as Abinaya's father
- Renuka as Adithya's mother
- Shah Ra as Adithya's friend
- Manobala
- Aarush as Sandy
- Sujatha Babu
- Swaminathan
- Senthil Ganesh
- Rajaletchumy

== Production ==
In February 2017, Sibiraj agreed to work on an action thriller film directed by newcomer Vinod, who had previously made short films and had appeared on the Naalaiya Iyakkunar reality show for budding film directors. Vinod prepared the script for ten months and revealed that the film's shoot would take the film from Chennai to Kashmir and Pollachi. Ruben was signed as the film's editor, while Arvi and Ramjeevan were picked as cinematographer and music composer. Actress Nikhila Vimal joined the team in March 2017, stating that she would play a city based girl for the first time, following a series of films featuring her in rural settings.

The first schedule began in April 2017 in Kashmir and proceeded for twenty one days. The makers of the film sought permission from the producers of Ranga (1982) to reuse the title, with the producer stating that they wanted to name the film after the Hindu deity, Ranganatha. The producer of the film, Vijay K Celliah, revealed that the film would be along the lines of Mani Ratnam's Roja (1992).

== Release ==
The Times of India wrote that "A film of this kind deserves a romance that sizzles, but gets one that fizzles out right when it begins". Cinema Express said that "The lack of focus and a few too many missteps pull down this well-performed survival thriller from the heights that it had the potential to reach". A critic from Dinamalar gave the film a rating of 2 out of 5.
