= Vattam =

2022 film by Kamalakannan

- Directed by: Kamalakannan
- Written by: Shrinivas Kaviinayam
- Produced by: S. R. Prakashbabu; S. R. Prabhu
- Starring: Sibi Sathyaraj; Andrea Jeremiah; Athulya Ravi
- Cinematography: Mathesh Manickam
- Edited by: Ruben
- Music by: Nivas K. Prasanna
- Production company: Dream Warrior Pictures
- Release date: 29 July 2022
- Running time: 116 minutes
- Country: India
- Language: Tamil

Vattam (transl. Circle) is a 2022 Indian Tamil-language action drama film directed by Kamalakannan. The film stars Sibi Sathyaraj, Andrea Jeremiah, Athulya Ravi and Shyam Prasad. Principal photography of the film commenced in around July 2018. The film was released on 29 July 2022 on Disney+ Hotstar.

== Premise ==
Mano decides to get dead drunk on the eve of his ex-girlfriend's Kokilavani's wedding but gets thrown out of the wine shop. He gets cheated and goes on to kidnap a random businessman named Gautham where he bumps into and eventually swaps Gautham's wife Parvathy as the hostage.

== Cast ==
- Sibiraj as Mano
- Andrea Jeremiah as Parvathi
- Athulya Ravi as Kokilavani
- Vamsi Krishna as Gautham
- Bala Saravanan as Mano's friend
- Renuka as Mano's mother
- Chaitra Reddy
- Shyam Prasad as Matthew, Kokilavani's Husband

== Production ==
The shooting of the film began during July 2018 and the portions of the film were mostly shot and set in Coimbatore. Sibi Sathyaraj signed onto play the lead role while he wrapped up shooting for Ranga with Athulya Ravi and Andrea Jeremiah roped into play the pivotal roles as main female leads in the film.

== Reception ==
S Subhakeerthana of OTTplay Noted that " Vattam is not a great film by any standards, but it’s well intended and it goes about its job with sincerity, and sometimes, just sometimes, that’s enough." and gave 3.5 stars out of 5. Cinema Express critic wrote that "The film wouldn't have been such a tough watch if director Kamalakannan had decided to have fun with the limited story and write characters that don't take themselves seriously. But what is in the offering is just the opposite. " and gave 1.5 stars
