= Peya Kaanom =

2022 horror comedy film

- Promotional poster
- Directed by: Selva Anbarasan
- Starring: Selva Anbarasan; Meera Mitun; Kausik
- Production company: Global Entertainment
- Release date: 23 December 2022
- Country: India
- Language: Tamil

Peya Kaanom (English: The Ghost is Missing) is a 2022 Indian Tamil-language horror comedy film directed by Selva Anbarasan and starring himself, Meera Mitun and Kausik in the lead roles. It was released on 23 December 2022.

== Cast ==
- Selva Anbarasan
- Meera Mitun
- Kausik
- Sandhya Ramachandran
- Kothandam
- Madurai Mani
- Tarun Gopi
- Jaguar Thangam

== Production ==
In July 2021, reports emerged of a fallout between the film's director Selva Anbarasan and actress Meera Mitun about her smoking on-set. In December 2021, Selva alleged that Meera had absconded from the shoot of the film in Kodaikanal. The director added his general sadness over Meera’s behaviour noting “she never valued the time and efforts of other stars and technicians" involved in the film shoot. Eventually, the director managed to complete the shoot without Meera Mitun.

During the promotions of the film, Selva Anbarasan sarcastically thanked Meera Mitun for promoting the film through her absence, while alluding to the title of the film.

== Reception ==
The film was released on 23 December 2022 across Tamil Nadu. A reviewer from the Madurai-based Thinaboomi newspaper gave the film a negative review, noting that "it was not a funny film". Critic Malini Mannath noted "with neither horror nor comedy going for it Peiya Kaanom is a film better forgotten" and added "that it’s the work of a debutant is evident all the way through, both in its amateur writing and in the shoddy execution".
