= Sibi Sathyaraj =

Indian actor

- Born: 6 October 1982 (age 43); Madras, Tamil Nadu, India
- Other name: Sibiraj
- Education: Loyola College, Chennai
- Occupation: Actor
- Years active: 2003–present
- Spouse: Revathi (m. 2008)
- Children: 2
- Parent(s): Sathyaraj (father); Divya Sathyaraj (sister)

Sibi Sathyaraj (also credited as Sibiraj) is an Indian actor working in the Tamil film industry. He is the son of actor Sathyaraj.

== Education ==
Sibi did his schooling in Sherwood Hall Senior Secondary School and Don Bosco Matriculation Higher Secondary School and Loyola College, Chennai, where he completed a degree in commerce.

== Film career ==
In early 2003, Sibi was set to make his acting debut through Swami, the Tamil remake of the Malayalam film Nandanam (2002), directed by Renjith. However, despite beginning pre-production work, the film was later dropped.

Sibi then started his acting career with the 2003 film Student Number 1, which was a box office failure. In his next four films, Jore (2004), Mannin Maindhan (2005), Vetrivel Sakthivel (2005) and Kovai Brothers (2006), he acted with his father, Sathyaraj, who also produced Sibi's following project, Lee (2007), directed by Prabhu Solomon, where he played the role of a football player. In his early years, several films he was announced to be part of, such as Perumal Swamy, Pattasu and Mamu, were shelved midway.

Subsequently, Sibi took a break from acting; his next film, Naanayam (2010). was released three years after Lee. The film, directed by Shakti Soundar Rajan, saw Sibi playing his first negative role. Although his performance was well received, the film did not fare well. Following Naanayam he went on another sabbatical, during which he pursued an acting workshop at the New York Film Academy (NYFA) in Los Angeles for three months, before returning in 2014 with Naaigal Jaakirathai, again directed by Shakti Soundar Rajan. The film, which Sibi reportedly accepted after having listening to more than 200 scripts, featured him alongside a Belgian Shepherd dog as the protagonist. His next titles were Pokkiri Raja (2016), Jackson Durai (2016), Kattappava Kanom (2017) and Sathya (2017).

Then, Sibiraj played a cop in the action crime thriller Walter, directed by U. Anbarasan. Then he appeared in Kabadadaari (2021) a neo-noir thriller directed by Pradeep Krishnamoorthy, a remake of the Kannada film Kavaludaari. In 2022, he appeared in three films including Ranga, Maayon and Vattam.

== Personal life ==
On 14 September 2008, Sibi married Revathi, an engineer who works for an IT company in Chennai. The two had been in a relationship for thirteen years before getting married.

== Filmography ==
Key
†	Denotes films that have not yet been released

Year	Film	Role	Notes
2003	Student Number 1	Sibi	
2004	Jore	Sakthi	
2005	Mannin Maindhan	Kathir	
2005	Vetrivel Sakthivel	Sakthivel	
2006	Kovai Brothers	Vasanth	
2006	Nenjil	Himself	Cameo appearance
2007	Lee	Leelatharan	
2010	Naanayam	Fareed	
2014	Naaigal Jaakirathai	Inspector Karthik Chinnamalai	
2016	Pokkiri Raja	"Cooling Glass" Guna	
2016	Jackson Durai	SI Sathya	
2017	Kattappava Kaanom	"Bad Luck" Pandian	
2017	Sathya	Sathya	
2020	Walter	DSP Walter IPS	
2021	Kabadadaari	SI Shakti	
2022	Ranga	Ranga	
2022	Maayon	Arjun Manimaran	
2022	Vattam	Mano	
2025	Ten Hours	Inspector R. Castro	
