= Astakarmma =

2022 mystery drama film

- Theatrical release poster
- Directed by: Vijay Tamilselvan
- Produced by: C. S. Padamchand; C. S. Ariyan Raaj; C. S. Kishan
- Starring: C. S. Kishan; Nandini Rai; Shritha Sivadas
- Cinematography: R. B. Gurudev
- Edited by: Mani Kumaran; R. K. Srinath
- Music by: L. V. Muthu Ganesh
- Production company: Mishri Enterprises
- Release date: 11 February 2022
- Country: India
- Language: Tamil

Astakarmma is a 2022 Indian Tamil-language mystery drama film written and directed by Vijay Tamilselvan. The film's producer C. S. Kishan, Nandini Rai, and Shritha Sivadas appear in the lead roles. Produced by the studio of Mishri Enterprises, it was released on 11 February 2022.

== Cast ==
- C. S. Kishan as Arjun
- Nandini Rai as Megha
- Shritha Sivadas as Divya
- Dharani
- Priyadarshini Rajkumar
- Winner Ramachandran
- Bala Subramanian
- Thilak Shankar
- Krishna

== Production ==
The film marked the acting debut of C. S. Kishan, who had previously worked as a film producer and financier under his father's company, Mishri Enterprises. Production began in February 2020 and later resumed in September 2020, following the lifting of COVID restrictions in India. The film was completely shot in Chennai, with the team renting out a large mansion to shoot. The film's first look was revealed by Kishan's celebrity friends Jayam Ravi and S. Thaman during December 2020.

The film's music was composed by brother L. V. Muthukumarasamy and L. V. Ganesan, under the stage name of L. V. Muthu Ganesh. T. Rajendar wrote the lyrics and sung for one song in the film. S. J. Suryah attended and praised the film during its audio launch in February 2022.

== Release ==
The film was released on 11 February 2022 across theatres in Tamil Nadu. A critic from Maalai Malar gave the film a mixed review, claiming it was low on thrills. A reviewer from the Madurai-based Thinaboomi newspaper also gave the film a mixed review. A reviewer from News Today wrote, "what starts well slowly, fizzled out towards the end". Film critic Malini Mannath wrote it is "a promising piece of work from a debutant maker and his team of freshers".
