= Maayon (film) =

- Theatrical release poster
- Directed by: N. Kishore
- Screenplay by: Arun Mozhi Manickam
- Produced by: Arun Mozhi Manickam
- Starring: Sibi Sathyaraj; Tanya Ravichandran
- Cinematography: C. Ramprasad
- Edited by: Ram Pandian; Kondalarao
- Music by: Ilaiyaraja
- Production company: Double Meaning Productions
- Release date: 24 June 2022
- Country: India
- Language: Tamil

Maayon is a 2022 Indian Tamil-language action adventure film produced by Arun Mozhi Manickam. The film stars Sibi Sathyaraj and Tanya Ravichandran in the lead roles. Ilaiyaraaja composed music for the film. The film was released theatrically on 24 June 2022.

A gang of idol smugglers plans to steal a hidden treasure in an ancient Hindu temple, that has mysterious secrets. The film received positive reviews from audiences and was a success at the box office.

== Plot ==
An archaeological team is assigned to research an ancient temple which is headed by a shrewd and tactful archaeologist. The team embarks on a quest of exploration, unravelling the mystery.

== Cast ==
- Sibi Sathyaraj as Arjun Manimaran, Senior Expert
- Tanya Ravichandran as Anjana, Epigraphist
- Radha Ravi as Krishnappa Naicker
- K. S. Ravikumar as Vasudevan, Archaeological Site in charge
- Bagavathi Perumal as DK
- G. Marimuthu as Minister Selvadurai
- Hareesh Peradi as Devaraj, Senior Director

== Production ==
=== Development ===
The film is produced by Double meaning Productions with screenplay by Arun Mozhi Manickam and star Sibi Sathyaraj in the lead role. The film is reported to be based on the mystery of a 5000-year-old temple, and the makers stated the film is made in the genre of a "mythological thriller". Ilaiyaraaja was signed as the film's music composer and cinematographer Ram Prasad. The film's official motion poster was released online on 25 August 2018.

=== Casting ===
Tanya Ravichandran signed the film in October 2018 and stated that she would begin working on her scenes during the following month.

=== Filming ===
The film was shot across regular schedules in late 2018 and early 2019, with the team filming scenes at Binny Mills during January 2019.

== Soundtrack ==
The music of the film is composed by Ilayaraja. The film’s album consists of four songs.

Track listing

- Maayonae Title Track – Ranjani–Gayatri
- Thedi Thedi – Srinisha Jayaseelan, T.K. Karthikeyan
- Krishna Bhajan Singara Madhana – Ilayaraja, Srinidhi Sriprakash
- Gandharva – Ilayaraja

== Release and reception ==
The film was made available for streaming on Amazon Prime Video, more than a year after its theatrical release.

M. Suganth of The Times of India rated the film 2.5 out of 5 stars and wrote "Most of the plot developments are delivered through exposition, and the staging doesn't give us a sense of the geography of the place. The casting and characterisation, too, don't work. Sibi Sathyaraj strains to pull off the layers in the character while Tanya's Anjana is mainly a token female presence. The tacky visual effects pretty much belong to the films we got when Marma Desam was on air. Perhaps realising this, Ilaiyaraaja comes up with an uncharacteristically bombastic score that tries to compensate for the lack of visual grandeur. The film leaves us with the feeling of having squandered an opportunity to give us a desi version of The Da Vinci Code." Ram Venkat Srikar of Cinema Express rated the film 2 out of 5 stars stating that "Maayon is one of those films that is more amusing as an idea in mind or as text on paper. You can see the effort being poured in to translate this vision onto the screen, but somehow, the execution, although adequate, doesn’t do justice to the imagination of both the creator and the viewer." Sruthi Ganapathy Raman of Film Companion after reviewing the film, stated "The issue with the film, which actually has a line-up of impressive actors (including KS Ravikumar in a small role), is that neither does it take its cheesiness seriously nor does it take its archaeology seriously. This is clear when Arjun, a few minutes into the film, flips an ancient Chola-period coin and puts on his sunglasses to evoke “style points”, only for everyone to break into applause."

However, A critic from Maalai Malar gave 3.5 rating out of 5 and stated that the screenplay is a combination of spirituality and science.Dinamani critic wrote that the way the stories were told in puppetry was good. Dinamalar critic gave 3 rating out of 5.

== Sequel ==
Owing to the film’s success, the makers of the film have announced a sequel to Maayon, under the title Maayon: Chapter 2.
