= Meera Mitun =

Indian actress and model (born 1984)

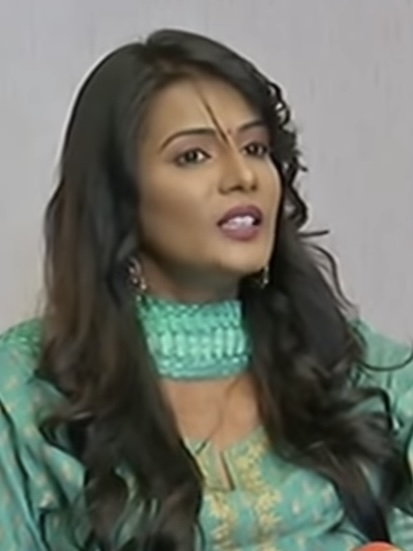
- Meera in 2019
- Born: Tamizhselvi; Chennai, Tamil Nadu, India
- Occupations: Model, actress
- Years active: 2013 – 2022

Meera Mitun (born Tamizhselvi) is an Indian former model and actress, who has appeared in Tamil language movies. Meera is known for her extensive controversies and allegations. She has also been in jail multiple times due to various allegations recorded against her.

== Personal life ==
Meera Mitun was born as Tamizh Selvi in 1984. She is from Chetpet and is the daughter of D. Mani, a civil engineer, and Shyamala, a homemaker. Her brother Thamizhamuthan is an engineer. She did her bachelor's degree in microbiology from Ethiraj College for Women and her master's degree from SRM University Chennai. She then briefly worked as a researcher at Dr Cherian's Foundation.

Mitun is divorced following a brief marriage which lasted for very few days.

== Career ==
=== As a model ===
In mid-2013, Mitun was spotted by choreographer Ganesh Guru, who convinced her to try out as a model. After a few auditions, she took part in her first fashion show for Co-Optex, a wedding saree brand. She moved on to work with brands such as Kingfisher and competed in the Miss Face of Chennai beauty pageant. Mitun took part in the Miss Madras 2015 pageant, finishing as a runner-up behind Deepika Murali. By 2015, she was a regular participator on the Chennai modelling and social scene, notably featuring on the Cinema Spice Chennai Fashion Calendar.

She took part in Star Vijay's Jodi Number One show in early 2015, as a part of its eighth season and was thrown out after the judges were unhappy with her attitude.

In 2016, she was crowned Miss South India 2016 at the zonal rounds of the Miss Queen of India 2016 pageant. She competed with eighteen candidates from five southern states to win the title. Later, she was dethroned following misconduct and fraudulent activities.

Following her victory, Mitun worked on a deal with sponsors Natural to mentor and handle the audition process for the competition for girls from Tamil Nadu.

In 2017, she helped set up the fourth Miss Tamil Nadu beauty pageant, under her newly designated role as Regional Director of Tamil Nadu Miss South India.

Mitun garnered criticism from audiences for posting a topless picture to mark Tamil New Year in 2018.

She soon fell out with the organisers of the Miss Tamil Nadu beauty pageant and chose to create her own competition titled Miss Tamil Nadu Diva for 2019. She later alleged that Ajith Ravi, an organiser of the Miss Tamil Nadu beauty pageant, had sent her death threats to stop her from going ahead with the event. Ravi denied her allegations and labelled that Mitun had engaged in fraudulent behaviour, taken money from other designers and cheated potential contestants. Soon after, the organisers of Miss South India decided to revoke her 2016 title, owing to her fraudulent activities. The title was later given to Sanam Shetty. She was subsequently quizzed and then given anticipatory bail in relation to criminal charges.

=== As an actress ===
Mitun's first acting assignment was in Gautham Vasudev Menon's Yennai Arindhaal (2015) as a friend of the character played by Trisha. She shot for the film in late 2014 and appeared in scenes alongside Trisha and Ajith Kumar, but her character did not make the theatrical cut. During 2016, she shot for a small role in Elan's unreleased fantasy film Graghanam, and for a supporting role in 8 Thottakkal (2017), which became her first film release. Her next appearance was in Vignesh Shivan's heist comedy Thaanaa Serndha Koottam (2018), where she portrayed a supporting role. The makers had approached her after seeing her first film and cast her opposite Kalaiyarasan as an angry wife.

In 2018, Mitun revealed that she had auditioned to play Trisha's character in Karthik Subbaraj's Petta (2019) alongside Rajinikanth, and that she was also meant to feature alongside Vikram in Kamal Haasan's production Kadaram Kondan (2019). Ultimately, she did not feature in either film. Her next release was Bodhai Yeri Budhi Maari (2019), an action drama film starring debutant actors.

In June 2019, she took part in Star Vijay's Bigg Boss Tamil season-3 programme. Upon her exit, Mitun received offers to feature in Pandiraj's Namma Veettu Pillai (2019) and Agni Siragugal (2020). However, in the following months, she complained after her role was largely removed from the former film, and she was completely dropped from the latter film. She subsequently accused production studio Sun Pictures and actor Kamal Haasan for being involved in making

changes.

She also asked Modi to dismiss the ruling AIADMK government in Tamil Nadu for failing to control the COVID-19 pandemic.

Mitun supported the Citizenship (Amendment) Act, 2019 and praised Narendra Modi.

Mithun claimed that she was going to join a political party on 6 December 2020, the day of her birthday. On 8 December 2020, she claimed that she had joined a National party and is considering to join Rajinikanth's party if he officially starts it.

== Activism ==
Mitun announced on her Instagram page that she had been appointed as the state director of the anti-corruption commission in Tamil Nadu by the Government of India. She was subsequently removed from the posting for non-compliance in submitting a police clearance certificate.

== Controversies ==
=== Controversial statements against other actors ===
==== Legal action against Vijay and Rajinikanth ====
Mitun created a controversy in July 2020 when said that actor Vijay and Rajinikanth have defamed her and said that she will take legal action against them. She also said she is now in Hollywood because Kollywood has neglected her. She also asked prime minister Narendra Modi to destroy Tamil Nadu.

==== Criticism of Vijay, Surya, Jyothika and Trisha ====
Mithun made several derogatory remarks against actors including Trisha, Jyothika and Aishwarya Rajesh and Sangeetha, the wife of actor Vijay in August 2020. Director Bharathiraja condemned her statements. Representatives of the Vijay Makkal Iyakkam from Pattukottai filed a police complaint against her.

=== Arrest ===
Mithun was booked by the Tamil Nadu police's Cyber Cell on 10 August 2021 under seven provisions of Indian Penal Code (IPC) and Scheduled Caste and Scheduled Tribe Prevention of Atrocities Act for making casteist statements towards Scheduled Caste (SC) community in a video after complaints from Viduthalai Chiruthaigal Katchi, Dravidar Viduthalai Kazhagam and the Tamil Nadu Untouchability Eradication Front. She released a video challenging the police to arrest her. She was arrested on 14 August in Alapuzha, Kerala after failing to appear for a police inquiry two days earlier and was sent to judicial remand until 27 August. During her arrest, Mithun released a video claiming that she was being harassed by the police. On 26 August, she was granted bail and was subsequently arrested for another case and taken to prison.

== Filmography ==
Films

Year	Film	Role	Notes
2015	Romeo Juliet		
2017	8 Thottakkal	Maha	
2018	Thaanaa Serndha Koottam	Iniyan's friend's wife	
2019	Bodhai Yeri Budhi Maari	Roshan's girlfriend	
2020	Dreamy Nights		Web series
2021	Yennanga Sir Unga Sattam	Varsha	
2022	Peya Kaanom		

Television

Year	Programme	Role	Channel	Notes
2015	Jodi Number One – Season 8	Contestant	Star Vijay	Ejected
2019	Bigg Boss Tamil 3	Contestant	Star Vijay	Evicted Day 35
