= Foreign Sarakku =

2022 Tamil language thriller film

- Theatrical release poster
- Directed by: Vigneshwaran Karuppusamy
- Produced by: Gopinath Arumugam; Vigneshwaran Karuppusamy; Sundar
- Starring: Gopinath Arumugam; Sundar; Hussain
- Cinematography: S. Sivanath Rajan
- Edited by: B. Prakash Raj
- Music by: XPR (Prawin Raj)
- Production company: Neptune Sailors Production
- Release date: 8 July 2022
- Country: India
- Language: Tamil

Foreign Sarakku (transl. Foreign Alcohol) is a 2022 Indian Tamil-language thriller film directed by Vigneshwaran Karuppusamy and starring Gopinath, Sundar, and Hussain. It was released on 8 July 2022.

== Cast ==
- Gopinath Arumugam
- Sundar
- Hussain
- Surendar Sundarapandiyan
- Afrina
- Ilakkiya
- Harini

== Production ==
Vigneshwaran Kuppusamy, a short filmmaker, chose to make the film with financial backing from the lead actors Gopinath and Sundar, who often worked on his short films. The film was shot in Gujarat and coastal Tamil Nadu.

== Reception ==
The film was released on 8 July 2022 across Tamil Nadu. A critic from Maalai Malar gave the film a mixed review, noting that it was "low on excitement". A reviewer from Dina Thanthi gave the film a negative review.
