= Enjoy (2022 film) =

2022 romantic comedy film

- Theatrical release poster
- Directed by: Perumal Kasi
- Produced by: K. Lakshmi Narayanan
- Starring: Madhankumar Dhakshinamoorthy; Vignesh; Harish Kumar
- Cinematography: K. N. Akbar
- Edited by: Manikumaran
- Music by: K. M. Rayan
- Production company: LNH Creation
- Release date: 23 December 2022
- Country: India
- Language: Tamil

Enjoy is a 2022 Indian Tamil-language romantic comedy film directed by Perumal Kasi, starring Madhankumar Dhakshinamoorthy, Vignesh and Harish Kumar. It was released on 23 December 2022.

== Plot ==
A group of young people are trying to use social media to achieve their goals. However, they encounter various challenges along the way. Will they be able to succeed in their endeavours?

== Cast ==
- Madhankumar Dhakshinamoorthy
- Vignesh
- Harish Kumar
- Niranjana
- Aparna
- Charumisa
- Sai Dhanya
- Hasin
- Yogi Ram

== Reception ==
The film was released on 23 December 2022 across Tamil Nadu. A reviewer from the Thinaboomi newspaper gave the film a mixed review, though cited that "it may be an interesting watch for youngsters. A critic from ChennaiVision wrote that Perumal Kasi "has conveyed an important message at the climax. The director has designed the characters in such a way that they convey the message effectively". Critic Malini Mannath noted it was "a promising debut from a first time maker, ‘Enjoy’ offers much more than what one would have expected from a film by a debutant maker and his cast of freshers."
