= Nandini Rai =

Indian actress

- Born: Neelam Gouhrani; Secunderabad, Telangana, India
- Occupations: Actress, model
- Years active: 2010–present

Neelam Gouhrani, known professionally as Nandini Rai, is an Indian actress and model who works in Telugu films. She is the winner of the Miss Andhra Pradesh title of 2010. After modelling, she went to pursue a career in acting.

== Biography ==
Nandini hails from a Sindhi family. She completed her schooling from St. Albans High School, Hyderabad, graduating in 2005. She has completed her higher education in London. She has modeled for over 80 national and international brands. She holds an MBA Degree in finance from London. During her modelling stint, she has won several beauty contests, being named Miss Hyderabad 2008, Miss Andhra Pradesh 2010, Miss Pantaloons Fresh Face of AP 2009 and Miss Beautiful Eyes of AP 2010.

She has acted in the Hindi film Family Pack and the Telugu film Maaya. She has performed in another Telugu film Mosagallaku Mosagaadu. In 2012, she was seen in the Bollywood film Log In, too. She made her Malayalam film debut in A. Sajeed's Goodbye December. In the "musical love story", she portrays a young, naughty teacher. In 2014, she was signed for her first Kannada film Khushi Khushiyagi, in which she played a fashion designer. She has signed up her first Tamil film, a romantic thriller titled Grahanam. she has signed for a Telugu film Sudigaadu 2, in which she is playing a village belle. She was one of the contestants in reality show Bigg Boss 2, hosted by actor Nani.

== Filmography ==
=== Films ===
Year	Title	Role	Language	Notes
2011	Family Pack	Sultana	Hindi	
2011	040		Telugu	
2012	Hormones	Soumya Nayak	Telugu	
2012	Login	Divya	Hindi	
2013	Goodbye December		Malayalam	
2014	Maaya	Vaishali	Telugu	
2015	Khushi Khushiyagi	Priya	Kannada	
2015	Mosagallaku Mosagadu	Janaki	Telugu	
2018	Silly Fellows	Pushpa	Telugu	
2019	Sivaranjani	Sivaranjani	Telugu	
2021	Lalbagh		Malayalam	
2022	Astakarmma	Megha	Tamil	
2023	Varisu	Smitha	Tamil	
2023	CSI Sanatan	Divya	Telugu	
2023	Bhaag Saale	Nalini	Telugu	

=== Television ===
Year	Series	Role	Network	Language	Notes
2018	Bigg Boss S2	Herself	Star Maa	Telugu	Also available on Hotstar
2019	High Priestess	Ruby	ZEE5	Telugu	Streaming series
2020	Shootout at Alair	Nafisa	ZEE5	Telugu	Streaming series
2020	Metro Kathalu	Supriya	Aha	Telugu	
2021	In the Name of God	Meena	Aha	Telugu	
2022	Gaalivaana	Nandini	ZEE5	Telugu	Streaming series
