= Gayatri Rema =

Indian actress

- Born: Kerala, India
- Other name: Gayatri Iyer
- Occupation: Actor
- Years active: 2015–present

Gayatri Rema is an Indian actress who has appeared in Tamil language films. After portraying her first major lead role in Touring Talkies (2015), she appeared in the Tamil films Oruthal (2016) and Saaya (2017).

== Career ==
Gayatri Rema made her acting debut in the anthology film Touring Talkies (2015), after being recommended by the film's lead actor S. A. Chandrasekhar. Appearing as a young girl in a "modern" relationship, the film had music composed by Ilaiyaraaja, but the film did not perform well at the box office. Gayatri later appeared in another small budget film Oruthal, which received media attention after actor Jai Akash bought the distribution rights.

In 2017, Gayatri Rema featured as a village girl in the horror film Saaya directed and produced by Pazhanivel. The film, which featured her alongside Santhosh Khanna and Sonia Agarwal, had a relatively low profile release in February 2017. Her next release will be Villangam opposite actor Nandha, with Gayatri replacing actress Meenakshi midway through production.

== Filmography ==
=== Films ===
Year	Film	Role	Notes
2015	Touring Talkies		Anthology film; segment Selvi 5am Vaguppu
2015	Iridiyam	Sivaranjini	
2016	Oruthal	Vaishnavi	
2017	Mangalapuram		
2017	Dora		
2017	Saaya	Mala	
2017	Niranjana		
2017	Pranavam		
2017	Hara Hara Mahadevaki	Shwetha	
2018	Kasu Mela Kasu	Mynaa	
2018	Semma	Gayatri	
2018	Mohini	Ambujam	
2018	Karimugan		
2021	Pei Irukka Bayamen		
2021	Chidambaram Railway Gate		
2021	Pranavam		Telugu film
2022	Take Diversion	Sushma	
2022	Sivi 2	Maria	
2022	Ree	Reema	
2022	Mugamariyaan		
2022	Dha Dha		
2022	Paasakaara Paya		
2023	Vizhithelu		
2023	Raakadhan	Ananya	
2023	Akku	Swetha	
2023	Ra Ra Sarasukku Ra Ra		
2023	Va Varalam Va		
2025	Raja Veetu Kannukutty		
2026	Yaarra Andha Paiyan Naan Dhan Andha Paiyan		

=== Web series ===
Year	Series	Role	Notes
2018	Vella Raja		Web series released on Amazon Prime
2019	Police Diary 2.0		Web series released on ZEE5
2020	Kannampoochi		Web series released on ZEE5
2020	Mugilan	Devi	Web series released on ZEE5
