= Sajeed A. =

Indian screenwriter

Sajeed A
- Born: India
- Occupations: TV producer, screenwriter, film maker
- Years active: 2000–present
- Website: www.behance.net/sajeed

Sajeed A is a Mumbai-based television producer, filmmaker and screenwriter. He has been involved with several series on MTV, including MTV Girls Night Out, India's first horror reality show which won the Best Reality Show in Asian Television Awards, Singapore, 2011. His directorial debut in films was the short film Buddha Never Smiled.

== Career ==
Sajeed A. began his career with MTV India as a trainee producer, and he went on to associate and produce/direct some of the most popular shows and promos on MTV – Fully Faltoo, Most Wanted, LoveLine, VJ Profiles, Eat This, Dance Crew. He also directed heavy duty outdoor concerts like MTV Music Summit, and has associated with concerts like Deep Purple, Bryan Adams, MC Hammer etc., as well as Events like Style Awards, MTV Immies and the humour reality MTV Bakra. The Bakra association was pretty long, and his partnership with Cyrus Broacha went on for a decade.

His last directorial outing for TV was MTV Girls Night Out produced by Miditech for MTV India and it went on to win Best Reality Show at the Asian Television Awards, Singapore, 2011. It also won the Indian Television Academy award in the Best Thriller category. MTV Girls Night Out was Indian television's first foray into the horror reality genre.

Sajeed A. was also the creative director for the show MTV LoudLess, the Indian adaptation of the popular Japanese game show Silent Library.

He has directed many music videos for various artists like Blaaze – a 26/11 initiative called "Stand up Together, Unite Together" (by BlaaZe and Prince Ali) and bands like Fuzon (Unplugged), Sessions/Unplugged for Indian Idol, Lucky Ali and for the rockband Jigsaw Puzzle – The song from their first album 'Revelation' was nominated as the best music video shot and worked on using Digital technology at the IV Fest.

He is also involved with Mousiqui the musical from A&G Partners and Shafdani Entertainment as a Creative Director.

His directorial debut in films was the short film Buddha Never Smiled which went around internationally and got him the India Vision Best Debut Director (Shorts) award.

Two songs from the 2013 Bollywood movie Ghanchakkar – "Lazy Lad" and "Jholu Ram" which saw the come back of Altaf Raja was directed by Sajeed.A. "Lazy Lad" was innovative with its visual feel with striking colours, sets and props. The songs were shot by Polly Morgan in Mumbai.

He was one of the directors of the 2022 six-part series Epic Train Journeys from Above, produced by Renegade Pictures.

In 2024, Vadakkan, which he directed, was one of seven Gala Screenings at the Fantastic Pavilion, Marché du Film, Cannes. It was released in theaters in March 2025 and won Best Supernatural Thriller at the Fright Night Film Festival.

== Filmography ==
- Buddha Never Smiled (Short film)
- Vadakkan (2025)

== Awards ==
- Buddha Never Smiled– India Vision Best Debut Director (Shorts)
- MTV Girls Night Out – Best Reality Show, Asian Television Awards, Singapore, 2011, Best Thriller 2011, Indian Television Academy Award
- Cinematography (Merit) Indian Documentary Producers Association, 2011
