= Karuthukalai Pathivu Sei =

2019 Indian Tamil-language crime thriller film

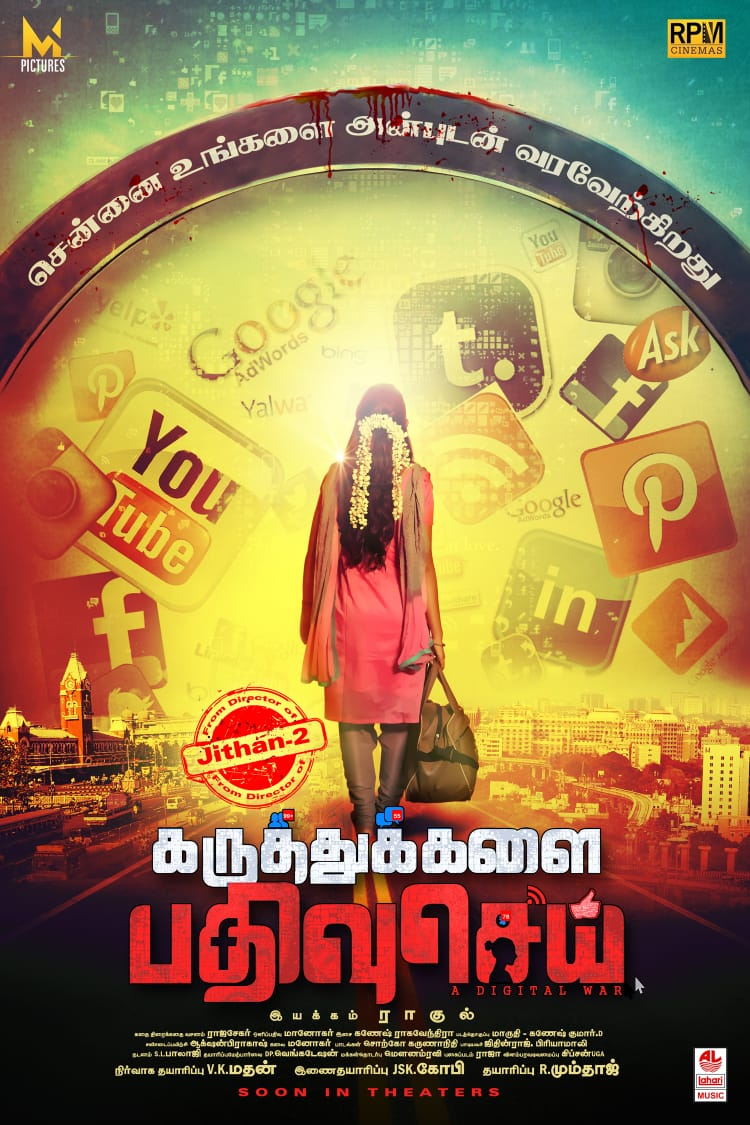
- Film poster
- Directed by: Rahul Paramahamsa
- Starring: SSR Aryan; Upasana RC
- Cinematography: Manohar
- Edited by: Ganesh Kumar
- Music by: Ganesh Raghavendra
- Production companies: RPM Cinemas; Sri Siva Saai Arts
- Release date: 13 December 2019
- Running time: 101 minutes
- Country: India
- Language: Tamil

Karuthukalai Pathivu Sei (transl. Record the opinions) is a 2019 Indian Tamil-language social thriller film directed by Rahul Paramahamsa. The film stars Upasana RC in the lead role. The theme of the film is based on the challenges and issues confronted by women in the society due to social media. Principal photography of the film commenced in late 2018. The film was released on 13 December 2019.

== Synopsis ==
A girl who is influenced by social media, struggles and falls into love trap which was set by malicious men. She then realizes her blunder and attempts to escape from the tragedy.

== Cast ==
- SSR Aryan
- Upasana RC as Bharathi
- TK Srinivasan

== Production ==
The film was announced by director Rahul Paramahamsa which was his third directorial venture after 2016 film Jithan 2 & 2017 film 1am. The filmmakers roped in SSR Aryan as the male lead and Upasana RC in female lead which marked her third film after Traffic Ramasamy and Brahma.com. The film was predominantly shot and set in Chennai and the filming completed within 25 days. The first look poster of the film was unveiled in November 2019 and the official trailer was unveiled on 25 November 2019.

== Reception ==
The Times of India gave the film a rating of one-and-half out of five stars and stated that "The movie becomes preachy after a point and turns out to be another reason why we find it difficult to sit through the film. Upasana’s performance as the revenge-seeking rape victim is decent, though".
