= NTR: Mahanayakudu =

2019 Indian film by Krish Jagarlamudi

- Theatrical release poster
- Directed by: Krish Jagarlamudi
- Screenplay by: Krish Jagarlamudi
- Dialogues by: Sai Madhav Burra
- Story by: Krish Jagarlamudi; Nandamuri Balakrishna
- Produced by: Nandamuri Balakrishna; Sai Korrapati; Vishnu Vardhan Induri
- Starring: Nandamuri Balakrishna; Nandamuri Kalyan Ram; Rana Daggubati; Vidya Balan
- Cinematography: Gnana Shekar V. S.
- Edited by: Rama Krishna Arram; Santosh Kiran Billakurti
- Music by: M. M. Keeravani
- Production companies: NBK Films; Vaaraahi Chalana Chitram; Vibri Media
- Release date: 22 February 2019
- Running time: 128 minutes
- Country: India
- Language: Telugu

NTR: Mahanayakudu (transl. NTR: The Great Leader) is a 2019 Indian Telugu-language biographical film directed by Krish Jagarlamudi, based on the political career of N. T. Rama Rao. It is produced by Nandamuri Balakrishna, Sai Korrapati, Vishnu Vardhan Induri under NBK Films, Vaaraahi Chalana Chitram, and Vibri Media. It is the second film in a two-part series, the first being NTR: Kathanayakudu. The film stars Nandamuri Balakrishna, Vidya Balan, Nandamuri Kalyan Ram, and Rana Daggubati in the lead roles. The film's music was composed by M. M. Keeravani.

== Plot ==
Following his public announcement of the Telugu Desam Party (TDP), N. T. Rama Rao aka NTR designs the party's flag and core agenda, planning a comprehensive tour across undivided Andhra Pradesh. He tasks his son, Nandamuri Harikrishna, with converting an old Chevrolet van into an improvised campaign vehicle, which he names the "Chaitanya Ratham." Driven by Harikrishna and accompanied by his son-in-law, Daggubati Venkateswara Rao, Rama Rao embarks on an exhausting, historic pilgrimage across the state, successfully rallying public admiration and challenging the political establishment. Alarmed by his soaring popularity, Prime Minister Indira Gandhi advances the state assembly elections and appoints Kotla Vijaya Bhaskara Reddy as the new Chief Minister to stabilize the ruling Congress party's position.

Internal friction arises when political ally Nadendla Bhaskar Rao drafts a candidate list featuring compromised former politicians. Rama Rao rejects the proposals, opting to field young, uncorrupted newcomers instead. Concurrently, Nara Chandrababu Naidu, Rama Rao's son-in-law, contests the election on a Congress ticket but loses. Recognizing Naidu's underlying organizational talent, Rama Rao convinces the disillusioned politician to defect and join the TDP. The elections culminate in a historic landslide victory for the TDP, and Rama Rao is sworn in as the tenth Chief Minister of Andhra Pradesh.

As Chief Minister, Rama Rao adopts saffron robes to signify his renunciation of personal luxury for public welfare. He introduces radical administrative reforms and welfare schemes, including a ₹2-per-kilogram rice program for low-income families, equal inheritance rights for daughters, the abolition of the feudal Patel-Patwari system, the introduction of the decentralized Mandal system, and the Telugu Ganga irrigation project. His rigid anti-corruption stance extends to his own family and political circle, alienating Bhaskar Rao, who begins secretly plotting a rebellion. When Rama Rao aggressively confronts Indira Gandhi over the central government's withholding of state funds, she appoints a hostile Governor, Thakur Ram Lal, to systematically undermine his administration.

Personal and physical crises intersect when Basavaramatarakam is diagnosed with terminal cancer, and Rama Rao simultaneously suffers a severe cardiac ailment. The couple travels to the United States for his urgent bypass surgery. Seizing his absence, Bhaskar Rao negotiates a covert alliance with Indira Gandhi and Governor Ram Lal. Upon Rama Rao's return, Bhaskar Rao orchestrates a fraudulent political coup, claiming the chief ministership under the false pretense of a majority. Rama Rao directly marches his loyal legislators to the Raj Bhavan to prove his democratic mandate, but Governor Ram Lal dismisses the evidence and orders his arrest. Following his release, a terminally ill Basavaramatarakam rejuvenates his resolve, promising to withstand her illness until he successfully reclaims his office.

Rama Rao relaunches his Chaitanya Ratham, generating massive public outrage and uniting nationwide anti-Congress opposition leaders. Operating as the strategic backbone of the movement, Chandrababu Naidu safeguards the loyal TDP legislators in secure, out-of-state locations to prevent political horse-trading. Naidu and Rama Rao paraded their majority of MLAs before the President of India, Zail Singh, who formally orders a legislative confidence motion. Though Bhaskar Rao employs stall tactics to delay the assembly session, escalating civilian strikes and national protests paralyze the state. Conceding defeat, Indira Gandhi withdraws her backing of Bhaskar Rao and replaces Ram Lal with Shankar Dayal Sharma as Governor. Governor Sharma immediately dismisses the usurpers and reinstates Rama Rao as Chief Minister. After taking his oath of office, Rama Rao returns home to his wife, and the film concludes with Basavaramatarakam passing away peacefully in his embrace.

== Cast ==
- Nandamuri Balakrishna as N. T. Rama Rao
  - Master Nara Devansh and Master NTR as young N. T. Rama Rao
- Vidya Balan as Nandumari Basavatarakam
- Nandamuri Kalyan Ram as Nandamuri Harikrishna
- Rana Daggubati as Nara Chandrababu Naidu
- Bharath Reddy as Daggubati Venkateswara Rao
- Daggubati Raja as Nandumuri Trivikrama Rao
- Sachin Khedekar as Nadendla Bhaskar Rao
- Vennela Kishore as Rukmanandha Rao
- Surya Sreenivas as Nandumuri Jayakrishna
- Garapati Srinivas as Nandamuri Saikrishna
- Rohith Bhardwaj as Nandamuri Ramakrishna Jr
- Jakhee as Poornachandra Rao
- Sameer as Venkaiah Naidu
- Babloo Prithiveeraj as Jaipal Reddy
- Sikindar as M. G. Ramachandran
- Suresh Kumar as P. V. Narasimha Rao
- Sritej as Y. S. Rajasekhara Reddy
- Satya Thummala as Shankar Dayal Sharma
- Revathinath as Atal Bihari Vajpayee
- Chandra Prakash Thakur as Thakur Ram Lal
- Varla Ramaiah as Kotla Vijaya Bhaskara Reddy
- Ramana Bhargav as Parvathaneni Upendra
- Gopal Rao as K. C. Abraham
- Shaan Vaj as Asaduddin Owaisi
- Girish as Ramoji Rao
- Silver Suresh as Ramakrishna Hegde
- K. V. Srinivas as Jyoti Basu
- Lakshman as Bhajan Lal
- Shaan as Farooq Abdullah
- Krishna as Vasantdada Patil
- Subba Rao as Sripati Mishra
- Guldeep as Zail Singh
- Sundaram as Charan Singh
- Pardhasaradhi as Mogaligundla Baga Reddy
- Chalapathi as Chandra Rajeswara Rao
- Praveen Cheda as Kakarla Subba Rao
- Madhu as Dr. Somaraju
- Bhaskara Chary as Dr. Nori Dattatreya
- Vijay Kumar as Viswanatha Satyanarayana
- Phanindra Gollapalli as Nagayya (NTR's Uncle)
- Subhash as Nandamuri Laxmaiah Chowdary
- Nageswara Rao as A. Pundarikakshaiah
- Chalapathi Raju as Reporter
- Supriya Vinod as Indira Gandhi
- Poonam Bajwa as Garapati Lokeswari
- Manjima Mohan as Nara Bhuvaneswari
- Himmansi Chowdary as Daggubati Purandeswari
- Heroshini Komali as Kantamaneni Uma Maheswari
- Siva Priya as Nandamuri Vasundara Devi
- Shalini as Nandamuri Jayasri Devi
- Kanchan as Nandamuri Venkata Ramamma
- Mirchi Madhavi as Nannapaneni Rajakumari
- Appaji Ambarisha Darbha as T. Jeevan Reddy
- Goparaju Ramana as a government employee
- Sumanth as Akkineni Nageswara Rao (cameo appearance)

== Production ==
=== Filming ===
Balakrishna took a break from the shooting between 30 November 2018 and 4 December to campaign in the 2018 Telangana Legislative Assembly election for Telugu Desam Party thus causing a delay of about a week in the shooting schedule. By mid-December, about 90% of the shooting was completed.

=== Post-production ===
In mid-December, the film's post-production works have started.

== Soundtrack ==
NTR: Mahanayakudu

Film score by M. M. Keeravani
- Released: 21 December 2018
- Recorded: 2018
- Genre: Soundtrack
- Length: 31:53
- Label: Lahari Music
- Producer: M. M. Keeravani

M. M. Keeravani chronology
NTR: Kathanayakudu (2019)	NTR: Mahanayakudu (2018)	12 'O' Clock (2021)

The music is composed by M. M. Keeravani for both the parts. The music released on Lahari Music. The audio and trailer launch of the biopic was held at JRC Convention Center, Hyderabad on 21 December 2018. Veteran Telugu stalwarts Krishna, Krishnam Raju, Mohan Babu, K. Raghavendra Rao, N. T. Rama Rao Jr. and others attended the function along with complete Nandamuri family.

No.	Title	Lyrics	Singer(s)	Length
1.	"Kathaa Nayaka"	K.Siva Datta, Dr. K. Rama Krishna	Kailash Kher	3:35
2.	"Venditera Dora"	M. M. Keeravani	M. M. Keeravani	4:19
3.	"Bhantureethi Koluvu"	Sirivennela Sitarama Sastry	Chitra, Sreenidhi Tirumala	4:54
4.	"Kathanayaka (F)"	K.Siva Datta, Dr. K. Rama Krishna	Sreenidhi Tirumala, Ramya Behara, Mohana Bhogaraju	3:36
5.	"Ramanna Katha"	M. M. Keeravani	Chitra, Sunitha Upadrashta	5:09
6.	"Chaitanya Ratham"	Sirivennela Sitarama Sastry	M. M. Keeravani, Kaala Bhairava, Keerthi Sagathia, Sai Shivani	4:58
7.	"Rajarshi"	M. M. Keeravani, Dr. K. Rama Krishna, K. Siva Datta	M. M. Keeravani, Kaala Bhairava, Sreenidhi Tirumala, Sharath Santosh, Sathyaprakash	5:22
Total length:				31:53

== Release ==
NTR: Mahanayakudu was initially planned to be released on 24 January 2019. Later the date was revised to 26 January, then to 7 February coinciding with the release of Yatra on 8 February, a biographical film on former Chief Minister of united Andhra Pradesh Y. S. Rajasekhara Reddy. In January 2019, the crew took a four-day leave to celebrate Sankranti festivities causing a delay in shooting, and post-production work that would take about 10–15 days. The filmmakers thus reportedly planned to release the movie on 14 February. Due to NTR: Kathanayakudu's poor performance at the box office, the filmmakers postponed the release of NTR: Mahanayakudu, which was scheduled to be released on 8 February and instead premiered NTR: Kathanayakudu on Amazon Prime Video on 8 February. The makers intended the OTT release to reach a wider audience and act as a marketing stunt for the NTR: Mahanayakudu. Eventually, the movie was released on 22 February.

=== Critical reception ===
Suhas Yellapantula of The Times of India rated 2.5/5 criticised the movie of not meeting expectations of a typical biopic which lacked major parts of the political career of NTR and rather portraying him as a godly-figure as it was in the first part of the biopic. He opined, Balakrishna was more comfortable playing the old-NTR rather than the young-NTR, praised Rana for his acting and criticised Krish of ambiguous shifts in the film's theme between being a romantic story and a dramatic thriller. He concluded, "[calling the film] a biopic would be a great disservice to NTR’s political journey".

=== Box office ===
It was released with mixed expectations – high expectations from trade analysts and low expectations from others – due to the commercial failure of its prequel NTR: Kathanayakudu. The Telugu Desam Party politicians, including Nandigama MLA Tangirala Sowmya, held free shows at various locations in Andhra Pradesh and provided subsidises for the party's workers and used the film as a medium of campaigning for the upcoming 2019 Andhra Pradesh Legislative Assembly elections.

In its opening weekend, the film earned ₹3.4 crore (US$350,000) worldwide.
