= Kaalangalil Aval Vasantham =

Kaalangalil Aval Vasantham may refer to:

- Kaalangalil Aval Vasantham (1976 film)
- Kaalangalil Aval Vasantham (2022 film)
