= Kaalangalil Aval Vasantham (2022 film) =

2022 romantic drama film

- Poster
- Directed by: Raghav Mirdath
- Written by: Raghav Mirdath
- Starring: Kaushik Ram; Anjali Nair; Heroshini Kumar
- Cinematography: Gopi Jagadeeswaran
- Edited by: Leo John Paul
- Music by: Hari S R
- Production company: Aram Productions
- Distributed by: Vsquare Entertainment
- Release date: 28 October 2022
- Country: India
- Language: Tamil

Kaalangalil Aval Vasantham (transl. Among seasons, she is spring) is a 2022 Indian Tamil-language romantic drama film written and directed by Raghav Mirdath. The film stars Kaushik Ram, Anjali Nair, and Heroshini Kumar. The film released on 28 October 2022.

== Plot ==
The film begins with Shyam standing outside Anuradha's hostel. Seeing him wait for her in the rain, she falls for him, and she gives him her phone number. The next day, Shyam's father's friend came with his daughter Radhe. Shyam is about to message Anuradha on WhatsApp at the same time that Radhe starts talking to him, and she says she wants to marry him. Shyam is confused, but he agrees to marry her. Shyam meets Radhe in a restaurant, and he gives her a greeting card, but on the card he has written Anuradha's name. Though she finds that, she marries him. Shyam and Radhe understand each other, and they are happy. Everything goes well until Radhe finds his diary. Shyam is a filmy guy who has fantasies and romantic desires that he has seen in movies. He also has a diary, which is a to-do list about his romantic desires. Radhe finds that he uses the same theory for every girl with whom he has a romantic interest. Radhe asks him not to be a filmy guy and to stay in normal life, and because of her advice, he starts hating her. In the meantime, Anuradha is also searching for Shyam. What happens after this forms the rest of the story.

== Cast ==
- Kaushik Ram as Shyam
- Anjali Nair as Radhe, Shyam's wife
- Heroshini Kumar as Anuradha, Shyam's ex-lover
- RJ Vigneshkanth as Ekalaivan, Shyam's friend
- Swaminathan as Shyam's boss
- Mathew Varghese as Shyam's father
- Jaya Swaminathan as Shyam's mother
- Manikandan as Radhe's father
- Payal Manikandan as Radhe's mother
- Anitha Sampath as Preethi, Shyam's friend
- Tharun Prabhakar as Shyam's friend
- Arun as Pub owner
- VJ Rajiv as Radhe's friend
- Soundariya Nanjundan as Shalini

== Production ==
Producer C. V. Kumar of Thirukumaran Entertainment announced the film in December 2021, revealing that Raghav Mirdath would debut as a director and Kaushik Ram would appear as the lead actor. Kaushik Ram had previously worked as a model and trained as a theatre actor. Anjali Nair, who had earlier played the lead role in Nedunalvaadai (2019) and Taanakkaran (2022), was cast in the lead female role. Heroshini, who had earlier appeared in Telugu shows, was also cast in a further lead role.

The film's title was taken from a song in the film, Paava Mannippu (1961). During the making of the film, C. V. Kumar opted out of the project, and Aram Entertainment took over as producers.

== Reception ==
The film was released on 28 October 2022 across Tamil Nadu. A critic from Dinamalar gave the film a positive review, noting that it was a pleasant watch. A reviewer from Times of India gave the film a mixed review, adding that it was an "a decent romantic drama that engages you then and there".
