= NTR: Kathanayakudu =

2019 Indian film by Krish Jagarlamudi

- Theatrical release poster
- Directed by: Krish Jagarlamudi
- Screenplay by: Krish Jagarlamudi
- Dialogues by: Sai Madhav Burra
- Story by: Nandamuri Balakrishna; Krish Jagarlamudi
- Produced by: Nandamuri Balakrishna; Sai Korrapati; Vishnu Vardhan Induri
- Starring: Nandamuri Balakrishna; Nandamuri Kalyan Ram; Vidya Balan Sumanth
- Cinematography: Gnana Shekar V. S.
- Edited by: Rama Krishna Arram; Santosh Kiran Billakurti
- Music by: M. M. Keeravani
- Production companies: NBK Films; Vaaraahi Chalana Chitram; Vibri Media
- Release date: 9 January 2019
- Running time: 171 minutes
- Country: India
- Language: Telugu

NTR: Kathanayakudu (transl. NTR: The protagonist) is a 2019 Indian Telugu-language biographical drama film based on the life and acting career of N. T. Rama Rao. It was directed by Krish Jagarlamudi and produced by Nandamuri Balakrishna, Sai Korrapati, Vishnu Vardhan Induri under NBK Films, Vaaraahi Chalana Chitram, Vibri Media banners. The film stars Nandamuri Balakrishna, as his father N. T. Rama Rao, his nephew Nandamuri Kalyan Ram, and Vidya Balan in lead roles. The film's music is composed by M. M. Keeravani. It is the first instalment of a two-part series, followed by NTR: Mahanayakudu that shows the political journey of Rama Rao.

== Plot ==
In 1984, Nandamuri Basava Ramatarakam asks her son, Harikrishna, to fetch a photo album documenting the early life of her husband, legendary actor N. T. Rama Rao aka NTR. The narrative flashes back to 1947, when Rama Rao works as a sub-registrar at the Guntur sub-courts. Driven by a passion for acting, he resigns from his government job to pursue a career in cinema, receiving unwavering support from his wife and his loyal brother, Trivikrama Rao. He travels to Madras to meet filmmaker L. V. Prasad, who introduces him to director B. A. Subba Rao. Subba Rao casts Rama Rao without an audition as the lead in Palletoori Pilla. On the sets, he befriends established actor Akkineni Nageswara Rao aka ANR. Although the film is temporarily delayed due to financial constraints, Rama Rao secures a cameo in Mana Desam (1949), leading to a contract with Vijaya Productions. However, his formal debut with the studio, Shavukaru (1950), is a commercial failure.

Studio heads B. Nagi Reddy and Aluri Chakrapani plan their next fantasy project, Pathala Bhairavi (1951). Despite industry pressure to cast Nageswara Rao, director K. V. Reddy insists on Rama Rao for the lead role of Thota Ramudu. The film becomes a massive blockbuster, establishing Rama Rao as a superstar and prompting him to relocate his family to Madras. During a severe drought in Rayalaseema, Rama Rao unites the film industry to organize public donation drives. However, disputes arise between Rama Rao and Nagi Reddy. Rama Rao leaves the studio to establish his own banner, National Art Theatres, alongside Trivikrama Rao and his brother-in-law, Rukmanandha Rao.

Recognizing his immense value, Nagi Reddy and Chakrapani reconcile with Rama Rao. When he is cast as Lord Krishna in the landmark film Mayabazar (1957), many initially object, but his divine screen presence mesmerizes audiences. Following his performance in Sri Venkateswara Mahatyam (1960), the public begins to revere Rama Rao as a living deity, and pilgrims consider their journey to Tirupati incomplete without visiting him. Over the years, the couple is blessed with twelve children. When Rama Rao plans Seetharama Kalyanam (1961), no director agrees to helm a film centering on the antagonist Ravana, so Rama Rao takes over directorial duties himself. During the production of Irugu Porugu (1963), his eldest son, Ramakrishna, passes away. Showing immense dedication, he represses his grief to complete the day's shoot.

Years later, Rama Rao and Nageswara Rao are honored with the Padma Shri. At an official function, Prime Minister Indira Gandhi dismissively refers to them as "Madrasis," prompting a firm correction from Rama Rao, who asserts their distinct identity as Telugus from Andhra Pradesh. While Nageswara Rao spearheads the relocation of the Telugu film industry to Hyderabad, Rama Rao stays in Madras, determined to find a permanent solution for the cultural recognition of his people. When the Prime Minister declares a national Emergency in 1975, Rama Rao grows disillusioned by government overreach. To counter a professional slump, he constructs Ramakrishna Cine Studios in memory of his late son and directs the epic Daana Veera Soora Karna (1977). Playing three demanding lead roles, he completes the film in just 38 days, resulting in an unprecedented blockbuster.

When the devastating Diviseema cyclone hits Andhra Pradesh, Rama Rao and Nageswara Rao tour the state to collect public donations. Witnessing the structural suffering of the rural population triggers a profound transformation in Rama Rao, who resolves to dedicate his life to public service. Concurrently, the state's ruling party begins targeting Rama Rao's son-in-law, Nara Chandrababu Naidu, while frequent leadership changes imposed by the central government destabilize the state administration. When his childhood friend Bhavanam Venkatarami Reddy is sworn in as Chief Minister, Rama Rao attends the ceremony and meets political leader Nadendla Bhaskar Rao, who encourages him to enter politics and promises organizational backing. At the age of sixty, Rama Rao decides to establish a new political party. Backed by his son Harikrishna and his wife, Basavaramatarakam, Rama Rao publicly announces the foundation of the Telugu Desam Party.

== Cast ==
- Nandamuri Balakrishna as Sr. N.T.R.
- Vidya Balan as Nandamuri Basavatarakam
- Nandamuri Kalyan Ram as Nandamuri Harikrishna
- Sumanth as Akkineni Nageswara Rao
- Prakash Raj as Nagi Reddy
- Jisshu Sengupta as L. V. Prasad
- Murali Sharma as Aluri Chakrapani
- Naresh as B. A. Subba Rao
- Bharath Reddy as Daggubati Venkateswara Rao
- Sachin Khedekar as Nadendla Bhaskar Rao
- Daggubati Raja as Nandumuri Trivikrama Rao
- Surya Sreenivas as Nandamuri Jayakrishna
- Garapati Srinivas as Nandamuri Saikrishna
- Subhash as Nandamuri Laxmaiah Chowdary
- Vennela Kishore as Rukmangada Rao
- Poonam Bajwa as Garapati Lokeswari
- Manjima Mohan as Nara Bhuvaneswari
- Himanshi Choudary as Daggubati Purandeswari
- Heroshini Komali as Kantamaneni Uma Maheshwari
- Kanchan as Nandamuri Venkata Ramamma
- Master NTR as Nandamuri Ramakrishna
- Master Aaryaveer as Young Nandamuri Balakrishna
- Ravi Prakash as D. Yoganand
- Vasu Inturi as T. Prakash Rao
- Sai Madhav Burra as Peethambara
- Bhanu Chander as ACP
- Kasi Viswanath as Registrar
- Kireeti Damaraju as a Pandit

=== Cameo appearances ===
- Rana Daggubati as Nara Chandrababu Naidu
- Hansika Motwani as Jaya Prada
- Nithya Menon as Savitri
- Rakul Preet Singh as Sridevi
- Pranitha Subhash as Krishna Kumari
- Shriya Saran as Prabha
- Payal Rajput as Jaya Sudha
- Shalini Pandey as Sowcar Janaki
- Yashu Mashetty as S. Varalakshmi
- Pratyusha as G. Varalakshmi
- Satyanarayana as H. M. Reddy
- Nassar as Bhavanam Venkatarami Reddy
- Brahmanandam as Relangi
- Krish Jagarlamudi as K. V. Reddy
- Keshav Deepak as V. Nagayya
- Ravi Kishan as Ravikant Nagaich
- Appaji Ambarisha Darbha as T. Jeevan Reddy
- Subhalekha Sudhakar as P. Pullaiah
- S. V. Krishna Reddy as Kamalakara Kameswara Rao
- Srinivas Avasarala as D. V. Narasa Raju
- Giridhar as Janardhan
- Chandra Siddhartha as Dasari Narayana Rao
- Devayani as Akkineni Annapurna
- Vijayachander as Srisaila Jagadguru Swamy
- Sritej as Y. S. Rajasekhara Reddy
- Girish Pradhan as Ramoji Rao
- Prakash Kovelamudi as K. Raghavendra Rao
- N. Shankar as B. Vittalacharya
- D. D. Srinivas as T. Rama Rao
- Devi Prasad as Gummadi
- Ramajogayya Sastry as C. Narayana Reddy
- Sanjay Reddy as Pingali Nagendra Rao
- Arjun Prasad as Marcus Bartley
- Surabhi Jayachandra Varma as T. V. Raju
- Bhadram as Peketi Sivaram
- K. Sivasankar as Vempati Chinna Satyam
- Raghu Master as Saleem Master
- Eeswar Babu as S. V. Ranga Rao
- Siva Satyanarayana as C.S.R
- Lakshminarayana as Kantha Rao
- Mallikarjuna Rao as Dhulipala
- Madhav as G. D. Joshi
- Suresh Kumar as P. V. Narasimha Rao
- Suraj as V. C. Shukla
- Muralidhar Goud as Tanguturi Anjaiah
- Sridhar as Mohan Kanda
- P. Sunil Kumar Reddy as Kannappa
- Sridhar Akkineni as Kranthi Kumar
- Supriya Vinod as Indira Gandhi
- Harika as Bhavanam Jayaprada
- Jaya Naidu as Santha Kumari
- Bhagavathula Sowmya as L. Vijayalakshmi
- Geetanjali as Nirmalamma

== Soundtrack ==
NTR: Kathanayakudu

Soundtrack album by M. M. Keeravani
- Released: 21 December 2018
- Recorded: 2018
- Genre: Soundtrack
- Length: 31:53
- Label: Lahari Music
- Producer: M. M. Keeravani

M. M. Keeravani chronology
| Savyasachi (2018) | NTR: Kathanayakudu (2018) | NTR: Mahanayakudu (2019) |

The original score and soundtrack for both NTR: Kathanayakudu and NTR: Mahanayakudu were composed by M. M. Keeravani, marking his second collaboration with Krish and his consecutive fourth and fifth collaborations with Balakrishna. The music rights were acquired by Lahari Music. The audio and trailer launch, for the two films collectively, was initially scheduled to be held on 16 December 2018 in Nimmakuru, Krishna district, the birthplace of NTR. It was later held at JRC Convention Center, Hyderabad on 21 December.

| No. | Title | Lyrics | Singer(s) | Length |
|---|---|---|---|---|
| 1. | "Kathaa Nayaka" | K.Siva Datta, Dr. K. Rama Krishna | Kailash Kher | 3:35 |
| 2. | "Venditera Dora" | M. M. Keeravani | M. M. Keeravani | 4:19 |
| 3. | "Bhantureethi Koluvu" | Sirivennela Seetharama Sastry | K. S. Chithra, Sreenidhi Tirumala | 4:54 |
| 4. | "Kathanayaka (F)" | K.Siva Datta, Dr. K. Rama Krishna | Sreenidhi Tirumala, Ramya Behara, Mohana Bhogaraju | 3:36 |
| 5. | "Ramanna Katha" | M. M. Keeravani | K. S. Chithra, Sunitha Upadrashta | 5:09 |
| 6. | "Chaitanya Ratham" | Sirivennela Seetharama Sastry | M. M. Keeravani, Kaala Bhairava, Keerthi Sagathia, Sai Shivani | 4:58 |
| 7. | "Rajarshi" | M. M. Keeravani, Dr. K. Rama Krishna, K. Siva Datta | M. M. Keeravani, Kaala Bhairava, Sreenidhi Tirumala, Sharath Santosh, Mohana Bhogaraju | 5:22 |
| Total length: | | | | 31:53 |

== Production ==
=== Development ===
On 6 February 2017, Balakrishna announced that he will be making a biopic film on his father, N. T. Rama Rao, showcasing characteristics unknown to the public. Ever since, the ground work for the film has been under progress. Initially Ram Gopal Varma was slated to direct the movie, but later, he dropped out citing "creative differences" with Balakrishna. Teja was announced to direct movie following speculations in September 2017. Puri Jagannadh and Deva Katta were also considered by the film makers who settled with Teja. According to reports, Teja commenced work on the film. Balakrishna wanted to include as many songs as possible in the film which was opposed by director Teja. This, along with other "creative differences", led Teja to resign from the film in late April 2018, a month after the muhurat shot. In an interview with TV9 Telugu in May 2019, Teja stated he left the direction as he felt directing NTR's biopic is out of capabilities and thus wouldn't do justice to NTR, and denied any differences with Balakrishna.

It was then reported that the filmmakers approached several directors, including K. Raghavendra Rao, Krishna Vamsi, P. Vasu and Puri Jagannadh. Raghavendra Rao reportedly declined due to health issues. Speculations arose that Balakrishna would be directing the film apart from acting in it. Eventually Krish was signed in. He was directing Kangana Ranaut-starred Manikarnika: The Queen of Jhansi (2019) and made a controversial exit from it to direct the biopic. In late June, the filmmakers confirmed the biopic to be a single film, refuting reports of it being a two-part film. In July, The Hans India reported that Balakrishna was offered ₹80 crore (US$8.5 million), the highest amount ever offered for his film, by Sony Pictures in return for the rights of the film. However, Balakrishna declined the offer to produce as he intended to make it himself. Thus he established his own production firm "NBK Films" marking his debut as a producer.

The film was tentatively titled NTR – The Biopic before the makers announced in early October to release the biopic in two parts – NTR: Kathanayakudu and NTR: Mahanayakudu. Both the films together are referred to as NTR biopic. According to Krish, the filmmakers planned to release the biopic a single 5-hour-long film with two intervals, similar to Mera Naam Joker (1970) which was more than four-hours long and had two-intervals. However, according to him, the contemporary urban audience would not endure such prolonged films, and thus they decided to split the biopic in two parts.

=== Casting ===
In October 2017, reports surfaced that Mokshagna, son of Balakrishna, is being considered to play the cameo role of teenage-NTR, making his debut in films. However, the plans did not come to fruition. Further reports from March 2018 suggested that the filmmakers considered Sharwanand to be an option. Balan was approached the same month to portray the role of NTR's wife Basavatarakam marking her debut in Telugu cinema and, in July, was officially roped in. Paresh Rawal was considered for the role of Nadendla Bhaskara Rao, but Sachin Khedekar was signed in. Bengali-actor Jisshu Sengupta was roped in to portray the character of L. V. Prasad marking his debut in Telugu cinema.

In early August, Rana Daggubati revealed that he will be playing the role of N. Chandrababu Naidu, NTR's second son-in-law and then Chief Minister of united Andhra Pradesh, thus marking his first time playing the role of a living person on screen. Later in September, Sumanth revealed his role as his grandfather, Akkineni Nageswara Rao. In October, Nandamuri Kalyan Ram was confirmed to play the role of his father Nandamuri Harikrishna. Daggubati Raja was cast in the role of Nandamuri Trivikrama Rao, Rama Rao's brother, marking Raja's return to films after nearly two decades. In December, Vennela Kishore was roped in to play the role of NTR's manager. Prakash Kovelamudi was signed in to play the role of his father Raghavendra Rao. Balakrishna's grandson Aryaveer, then a 7-month-old toddler, played the role of child Balakrishna in a cameo appearance marking his debut in cinema.

=== Filming ===
The muhurat shot (first shot) was held on 29 March 2018 with a ceremonial puja at Ramakrishna Cine Studios, Hyderabad. Balakrishna dressed up as Duryodhana and started with his father's famous dialogue "Emantivi Emantivi" from the movie Daana Veera Soora Karna (1977). The event witnessed an attendance of several notable people of Telugu cinema and Vice President Venkaiah Naidu, who the muhurat (first) clap. A month later, in late April, the film fell into jeopardy after Teja exited the production. After Krish was roped in to direct, principal photography started in early July.

The first schedule of the shooting took place until 24 July. Sengupta started shooting in early July and wrapped up at the end of November. The team met with Chandrababu Naidu in August seeking his inputs for the portrayal of his character by Rana and shot his scenes during August–September. Kalyan Ram shot his scenes during September. In late November to early December, Balakrishna took a break from shooting as he partook in campaigning for Telugu Desam Party in the backdrop of 2018 Telangana Legislative Assembly election. Vennela Kishore's scenes were shot during December. By mid-December, most of the filming except the scenes of Chaitanya Ratham (transl. chariot of awakening) has completed.

Several scenes were shot at NTR's house in Abids, Hyderabad, where he lived during 1980s before moving to Banjara Hills in the 1990s. In an interview, Balan stated that she spoke to Balakrishna and his family to get familiarized to the character of Basavatarakam. The News Minute reported that Balakrishna would be portraying in 62 different depictions of NTR in his various films. The filming was wrapped up within 3 months. According to Krish, the shooting took 56 days. The film was reportedly made on a budget of ₹50 crore (US$5.3 million) becoming the most expensive film venture of Balakrishna's career.

=== Post-production ===
The film's post-production was completed in early January 2019.

== Release ==
=== Certification ===
In early January 2019, a week before the scheduled release on 9 January, the film was up for certification by the Central Board of Film Certification. The board sought No Objection Certificates from various family members of NTR, former Chief Minister of united Andhra Pradesh Nadendla Bhaskara Rao and NTR's second wife Lakshmi Parvathi as several characters portrayed in the film remain alive. Reportedly, Parvathi filed objections with the board. Previously, she threatened to take legal action if she was not asked for her permission to portray her role. Eventually, the board cleared the movie with a U certificate without any cuts.

=== Marketing ===
In December 2017, a teaser was shot by then-director Teja to announce the biopic. However, the teaser was not released. The film makers established 100 idols of Rama Rao at 100 theaters in Andhra Pradesh and Telangana when the film was released.

=== Theatrical release ===
During the muhurat shot event in late March 2018, then director Teja announced his intentions to release the film during Dussehra festivities. After Teja's exit, a release on the eve of Sankranthi in 2019 was considered due to upcoming elections in 2019 to the Andhra Pradesh Legislative Assembly and the Indian general election. The elections would trigger the enforcement of the Model Code of Conduct – a set of guidelines to be followed by the political parties and candidates during the election process – by the Election Commission of India thus blocking the film's release until after the elections. (Note: The Model Code of Conduct came into enforcement in Andhra Pradesh and Telangana on 10 March 2019 effective until 23 May.) In early October 2018, the filmmakers announced that it would be released on 9 January 2019. The film, as it was scheduled to be released only a few months before the 2019 general elections, was speculated to not portray controversial history of NTR's film career.

=== Screenings ===
NTR: Kathanayakudu was released, as planned, on 9 January 2019 in theatres worldwide in 1,100 screens; with more than 1,000 screens in Telugu-speaking states of Andhra Pradesh and Telangana to much fanfare. A limited number of screens were arranged in Tamil Nadu, Karnataka and Maharashtra in India and in the US, Canada, Australia and the Gulf countries where there is a presence of Telugu diaspora.

=== Distribution ===
The theatrical rights of the film were sold for ₹70 crore (US$7.5 million). Vintage Creations, Padmakar Cinemas and USHA Pictures distributed the film in Andhra Pradesh; Asian Cinemas, along with other minor stakeholders, distributed in Telangana; SPI Cinemas in Tamil Nadu; AA Films in North India and US Telugu Movie LLC in the US. Gemini Movies acquired the satellite rights for ₹25 crore (US$2.7 million). The filmmakers reportedly planned to sell the satellite and digital rights of the films – NTR: Kathanayakudu and NTR: Mahanayakudu – separately so as to recuperate a major chunk of production costs. The two films' satellite rights and digital rights were sold to over ₹100 crore (US$11 million).

=== Home video ===
Due to NTR: Kathanayakudu's poor performance at the box office, the filmmakers postponed the release of the film's sequel, NTR: Mahanayakudu, which was scheduled for 8 February 2019 and instead premiered NTR: Kathanayakudu on Amazon Prime Video on 8 February. The makers intended the OTT release to reach a wider audience and act as a marketing stunt for the sequel.

== Reception ==
=== Critical response ===
Sangeetha Devi Dundoo reviewing for The Hindu wrote that the film is an ode to NTR with strong background score and cinematography building up on the relations between NTR and Akkineni Nageswara Rao, however lacks drama and focuses more on idolizing Rama Rao rather than exploring his personal life and his flaws. Manoj Kumar R. reviewing for The Indian Express rated the film 2.5/5 and criticized that director Krish did not portray NTR from a human perspective and rather stuck to a divinely depiction like a messiah. He further criticized that the film looked nothing more than a stitch of NTR's life known to public. He praised Balakrishna's performance in the role of his father and a worthy moments of NTR's life and his accomplishments when one watches the film as a tribute to NTR. Suresh Kavirayani reviewing for Deccan Chronicle gave a 4/5 rating and wrote that the film is a tribute to NTR and is well directed by Krish with riveting narration focusing NTR's film career and personal life. He also wrote that the film only portrayed his rise to stardom despite conflicts involved him and praised Balakrishna's performance and termed it his best as he portrayed the character with finely grained techniques rather than his usual overt acting style.

Priyanka Sundar of Hindustan Times rated the movie 2/5 and wrote that the film portrays NTR as "larger-than-life" and as a perfect man and fails to examine at a deeper level into his character and motivations; his wife's character played by Vidya Balan is underdeveloped lacking chemistry with the lead character, Balakrishna. She concluded that it does not fully engage the audience with the lead character. S. Venkat Narayan, journalist and author of NTR: A Biography (1983), wrote in Hindustan Times applauding Krish for his undertaking to showcase a complex person such as NTR. He opined Balakrishna's performance in the first quarter as the younger NTR was not convincing enough but the rest was exceptional. He also praised Balan's performance, Gnana Shekar's cinematography and Keeravani's music. Krishna Sripada reviewing for The News Minute wrote that the film can be seen in different ways depending on the perspectives of the viewer – some seeing it as a documentation of NTR's life and career, while others finding it lacks dramatic impact and not as emotionally powerful as they had expected. He immensely praised Krish for bringing the right balance between these two. He wrote that the film serves as a nostalgic look back of Telugu cinema and fashion from that time period.

Janani Kumar of India Today rather 3/5 in her review and wrote that Balakrishna championed his role, but the film would have been realistic if it exhibited the struggles and faults apart from just NTR's achievements. She praised Balan's acting, background score and cinematography and summarized the film "falls short of becoming the best, leaving the star (N. T. Rama Rao) dehumanised". She also wrote of Balan with high praise for her acting skills and her efforts in learning an unfamiliar language. Hemanth Kumar reviewing for Firstpost rated 3/5 and wrote that the film serves as an extensive showcase of NTR's film career in Telugu cinema and that he was portrayed as "a perfect man, who always did the right thing" and thus an absence of "major drama or emotional upheavals". He opined that NTR's life until he entered politics was peaceful and thus there was no drama in the film. He praised the performances of Balakrishna and Balan, direction, background score and cinematography but could be exhausting due to its longer runtime. Jeevi of Idlebrain.com praised the performances of Balakrishna along with other cast, the direction by Krish and other elements of the film. He opined the film would nostalgic to people of NTR's era. He noted that the film lacks the typical features of a biopic – a tragic end and showcasing the imperfections of the central character.

Palaparthi Srividya of Cinema Express rated 2.5/5 and reviewed the film as a disappointment due to its inferior storytelling citing the director's misguided focus on representing NTR as a larger-than-life character rather on his life-story. She wrote that Balakrishna's performance was at peak during highly dramatic scenes and found the recreations of some of NTR's milestones – such as the camera trick done for Bhookailas (1958) and the famed dialogue from Daana Veera Soora Karna – to be exciting. Neeshita Nyayapati of The Times of India rated 3/5 and wrote that the film showcased NTR as "larger-than-life hero turned flawless god" and omits to display any struggles that he might have faced during his career. She praised the cast, direction, background score and cinematography but criticized the narration as uneven, slow moving with a non-human characterization of NTR. Pranita Jonnalagedda rated 3/5 in The Week and reviewed the film acts as a fitting antecedent for its sequel where the main drama in the life of NTR exists. She praised the direction, music, cinematography and Balan's acting despite her limited time-screen and noted the longer than usual runtime and the lack of any drama resulting in unstimulating narrative.

A reviewer in Telugu daily Eenadu, which historically supported the ruling Telugu Desam Party, praised the direction by Krish as being dramatic and natural, and complimented Balakrishna's performance although criticized his portrayal as young-NTR being inapt. The reviewer applauded the performances Balan, the secondary crew, the cameos and the technical crew and found fault at the running time. Sathish Reddy Jadda of Telugu daily Sakshi, controlled by the then-opposition leader Y. S. Jagan Mohan Reddy, wrote that the film focused on worshipping Balakrishna rather showcasing the life story of NTR. He also opined Balakrishna's portrayal as young NTR to be inapt but praisable in general. He wrote highly of Balan and music by Keeravani.

=== Box office ===
NTR: Kathanayakudu was released to higher expectations from trade experts, a few days before the Hindu festival of Sankranthi to ride on the holidays surrounding it. It saw a pre-release business at about ₹54 crore (US$5.8 million). It earned ₹6−7 crore (US$−750,000) on its first day. The film performed well in the US on the first day earning $443–500K and became one of the highest opening Telugu films of 2019 in the US. At the end of the first week, The Hans India reported the US gross earnings to be at $825K. India Today reported an estimated lifetime gross of ₹15 crore (US$1.6 million). The Hans India estimated a total of ₹18−20.62 crore (US$−2.2 million) collection causing a loss of ₹60 crore (US$6.4 million) for the distributors.

Rajinikanth-starred Tamil film Petta, Ram Charan-starred Telugu film Vinaya Vidheya Rama and Venkatesh–Varun Tej starred F2: Fun and Frustration, all 3 released days after NTR: Kathanayakudu, caused a split in overall box office collections. The film failed to generate growth and ended up as a box-office disaster.

== Impact ==
Speaking on the film's failure at the box-office, the director Krish stated "[he has] no clue why the first part of the biopic didn't do as well. Everyone who saw it, loved it. But not enough people went to see it in theatres."

Sowjanya Tamalapakula, professor of gender studies at Tata Institute of Social Sciences, Hyderabad, wrote that the film failed to delve into the progression of caste consolidation in the Kamma caste in the 1970s and 80s amidst The Emergency during 1975–77, and portrayed NTR as compassionate to underprivileged communities despite NTR consolidating the Kamma caste to which he belongs. (Note: Rama Rao tried to establish a political backing from the backward castes, impoverished rural communities, and women by doling out several populist initiatives and by enabling their inclusion in the power hierarchy.) She opined, as part of her case study into present-day biographical films and their relationships with feudalism and caste consolidation, that contemporary audience seem to tolerate hagiography, idolization, and the glorification of certain caste identities when the films are set in a different era and thus the depiction of NTR as an immaculate leader, unblemished by corruption, and leading a highly monogamous personal life fostered the acceptance of a hegemonic feudal figure as the saviour and leader of the common people.

== See also ==
- Lakshmi's NTR, a 2019 Telugu film directed by Ram Gopal Varma based on N. T. Rama Rao's biography
