= Irudhi Pakkam =

- Release poster
- Directed by: Mano Ve Kannathasan
- Written by: Mano Ve Kannathasan
- Produced by: Silambarasan; Kirubakar; Selvi Venkatachalam
- Starring: Amrutha Srinivasan; Rajesh Balachandiran; Shree Raj; Vignesh Shanmugam
- Cinematography: Praveen Balu
- Edited by: Ram Pandian
- Music by: M. S. Jones Rupert
- Production company: Insomniacs Dream Creations LLP
- Distributed by: Action Reaction Jenish
- Release date: 17 December 2021
- Running time: 95 mins
- Language: Tamil

Irudhi Pakkam (transl. The Last Page) is a 2021 Indian Tamil-language thriller film written and directed by Mano Ve Kannathasan and produced by Insomniacs Dream Creations LLP. The film stars Amrutha Srinivasan, Rajesh Balachandiran, Shree Raj and Vignesh Shanmugam in lead roles. The film's music is composed by M. S. Jones Rupert, while the cinematography is performed by Praveen Balu and edited by Ram Pandian.

== Cast ==
- Amrutha Srinivasan as Iyal
- Rajesh Balachandiran as Kumar
- Vignesh Shanmugam as Prasanth
- Shree Raj as Mithun
- Girija Hari as Jennifer
- Pasupathi Raj as Ramaswami
- Kishore Rajkumar as Sundaresan
- Swayam Siddha

== Production ==
The film marked the directorial debut of Mano Ve Kannathasan, an engineer-turned-filmmaker. Amrutha Srinivasan was selected after the filmmaker had seen her work on earlier web series projects such as Livin (2017) and Kallachirippu (2018). Mano felt that as she was also a theatre artist, she would be comfortable shooting in the style of guerrilla filmmaking. Theatre artist and trainer Rajesh Balachandiran, who had acted in Chennai 2 Singapore (2017), was also selected to play a crucial role in this film, as were Vignesh Shanmugam, Shree Raj, who had acted in the Malayalam film Cuban Colony (2018), Swayam Siddha and Kishore Rajkumar, the director of Naai Sekar (2022).

== Soundtrack ==
The soundtrack was composed by M. S. Jones Rupert. Director Mano Ve Kannathasan wrote the lyrics.

Irudhi Pakkam

Soundtrack album by M. S. Jones Rupert
- Released: 2021
- Length: 8:34
- Language: Tamil
- Label: Vasy Music
- Producer: M. S. Jones Rupert

M. S. Jones Rupert chronology
Poriyaalan (2013)	Irudhi Pakkam (2021)	Sattam En Kaiyil (2024)

Track listing
No.	Title	Singer(s)	Length
1.	"Kanavilum Kavithai"	Priyanka NK, Syed Subahan	3:52
2.	"Un Thedal"	Deepthi Suresh	4:42

== Release ==
The film was released on 17 December 2021 across theatres in Tamil Nadu. A critic from The Times of India gave the film a positive review, noting it "is a good thriller with an interesting plot that can intrigue the inner detective in you". The film was also reviewed by Tamil dailies Dinamalar and Maalai Malar.
