= Geethan Britto =

Indian actor

- Occupation: Actor
- Years active: 2013–2018

Geethan Britto is former Indian actor, who worked in Tamil-language films.

== Career ==
Geethan Britto studied visual communication and also assisted Sahithya Jagannathan's dance fusion presentation at the World Miss University contest in Seoul, Korea in 2010.

He made his debut through Kurai Ondrum Illai (2014). Regarding his performance, a critic noted, "Geethan, with his boy-next-door looks, has a charm that makes you relate to him. You empathize with him when he longs to help his friend and yet cannot do so as the latter chooses to give up and feel for him when he breaks up with his sweet heart" whilst another noted, "Debutant Geethan as Krishna has a charming screen presence, essays Krishna neatly, lending the right nuances to the character". The film was, however, a box office failure. His next film was the unreleased Aakko, which was noted for the song "Enakenna Yaarum Illaye" by Anirudh Ravichander.

His first film's cameraman recommended him for Oyee (2016) after Sivakarthikeyan couldn't accept the film due to date issues. He trained in silambam for the film for almost a month. Regarding his performance in that film, a critic noted, "The effort taken by Geethan in learning the basics of silambam deserves mention". Regarding his performance in his final film Seemathurai (2018), a critic noted, "Geethan still gives it his all and is earnest as Marudhu, who is only required to smile, get beaten up, dance, smile, get beaten up, and dance again, with dialogues that can fit into a single sheet of paper".

== Filmography ==
Year	Title	Role	Notes
2013	Kathai Kelu	Arjun / Arjunan	Short film
2014	Kurai Ondrum Illai	Krishna	credited as Geethan
2016	Oyee	Krishna	credited as Geethan
2018	Seemathurai	Marudhu	credited as Geethan
