= Aviyal (2016 film) =

2016 Indian independent anthology film

- First Look Poster
- Directed by: Alphonse Puthren; Shameer Sultan; Mohit Mehra; Lokesh Kanagaraj; Guru Smaran
- Written by: Alphonse Putharen; Shameer Sultan; Raju; Lokesh Kanagaraj; Guru Smaran; Suryaa Balakumaran
- Produced by: Karthik Subbaraj
- Starring: Nivin Pauly; Bobby Simha; Deepak Paramesh; Amrutha Srinivasan; Rajeev Pillai; Arjunan; Ramachandran Durairaj
- Cinematography: Mathan Gunadeva; Suriya Rajarajan; Selvakumar S. K. Kugan S. Palani; Anend C. Chandran
- Edited by: Mathan Gunadeva; Alphonse Putharen; Rohit; Philomin Raj; Prasanna GK; Boopathi Selvaraj
- Music by: Rajesh Murugesan; Javed Riaz; Shammeer Sultan; Vishal Chandrasekhar; Anthony Daasan; Raghu Dixit
- Production companies: Stone Bench Creations; Bench Flix
- Distributed by: Sri Thenandal Films
- Release date: 11 March 2016
- Country: India
- Language: Tamil

Aviyal is a 2016 Indian Tamil-language independent anthology film consisting of four short films directed by Alphonse Puthren, Shameer Sultan, Mohit Mehra, Lokesh Kanagaraj and Guru Smaran. Nivin Pauly, Bobby Simha, Amrutha Srinivasan, Rajeev Govinda Pillai, Arjunan, Ramachandran Durairaj, and Deepak Paramesh have featured in the short films included in the anthology.

Produced by Karthik Subbaraj under his Stone Bench Creations and Bench Flix, it was their second venture after Bench Talkies, which was initially launched after the phenomenal response of the latter. The project Aviyal was launched earlier in November 2015, and the film was distributed by Thenandal Films, which had a theatrical release on 11 March 2016.

== List of short films ==
Title	Director	Writers	Cinematographer	Music	Editor	Studio
Shruthi Bedham	Mohit Mehra	Raju	Suriya Rajarajan	Vishal Chandrasekhar, Dinesh Murugan	Rohit	Film Tribe
Kalam	Lokesh Kanagaraj	Lokesh Kanagaraj	Selvakumar S. K.	Javed Riaz	Philomin Raj	Backwater
Kanneer Anjali	Guru Smaran	Guru Smaran, Suryaa Balakumaran	Kugan S. Palani	Vishal Chandrasekhar	Prasanna GK, Boopathi Selvaraj	Madras Eye Films
Eli	Alphonse Puthren	Alphonse Puthren	Anand Chandran	Rajesh Murugesan	Alphonse Puthren	Black Money Production

== Plot synopsis ==
Aviyal is a collection of four short films; A young man attracted to his aunt, a filmmaker chasing robbers who have stolen his short film, two friends going on a trip to deposit the ashes of their friend, and a gangster narrating a story.

== Cast ==
Shruthi Bedham	Kalam	Kanneer Anjali	Eli
Amrutha Srinivasan as Shruti; Rohit Nandakumar as Raj; Naveen George Thomas; Vipreeth; Divya Kapoor; Karthick CM	Deepak Paramesh as a filmmaker; Moses Rajkumar as Michael; Krishnamoorthy as an actor	Arjunan as Dosa; Deepak Paramesh; Sharath Ravi; Ramachandran; Praveen Kumar; MLV Shankar	Nivin Pauly as Eli; Bobby Simha as Gangster; Rajeev Pillai as Garudan; Ranga; Ramachandran; Vijay Muthu; Sanjay; Jinu Joseph as Wild Horse

Special appearances in "Aviyal" promotional song

- Ashok Selvan
- Karunakaran
- Anthony Daasan
- Raghu Dixit

Special appearances in "Cinemakaaran" promotional song

- Anthony Daasan
- Kaali Venkat

== Production ==
Following the encouraging response to Bench Talkies – The First Bench (2015), Karthik Subbaraj announced plans of releasing a second anthology of short films soon after the initial project had released. The anthologies will be released under his Bench Flix, an initiative driven by Subbaraj's production house Stone Bench Creations, to provide reach and recognition to independent short film makers by distributing their short films across different avenues such as theaters, television, in-flight entertainment, radio and digital platforms.

In November 2015, a second production titled Aviyal was revealed to be in the editing stages, though the release of the film was delayed as a result of the 2015 South Indian floods. Subsequently, in January 2016, it was revealed that the anthology of films would include Alphonse Puthren's Eli starring Nivin Pauly, while other actors including Bobby Simha, Arjunan Nandakumar and Amrutha Srinivasan would appear in the film.

== Soundtrack ==
Aviyal

Soundtrack album by Rajesh Murugesan, Javed Riaz, Shammeer Sultan, Vishal Chandrasekhar, Anthony Daasan and Raghu Dixit
- Released: 12 February 2016
- Recorded: 2015–2016
- Genre: Feature film soundtrack
- Length: 18:56
- Language: Tamil
- Label: Think Music

Rajesh Murugesan chronology
Action Hero Biju (2016)	Aviyal (2016)	Premam (2016)

Javed Riaz chronology
Aviyal (2016)	Maanagaram (2016)

Vishal Chandrasekhar chronology
Jil Jung Juk (2015)	Aviyal (2016)	Aagam (2016)

Anthony Daasan chronology
Aviyal (2016)	Uriyadi (2016)

Raghu Dixit chronology
Bewakoofiyaan (2014)	Aviyal (2016)	Happy New Year (2017)

The film's soundtrack album features six tracks (of four songs and two instrumentals) composed by Rajesh Murugesan, Javed Riaz, Shammeer Sultan, Vishal Chandrasekhar, Anthony Daasan and Raghu Dixit, with lyrics written by Shameer Sultan, Suryaa Balakumaran, Mani Amudhavan and Charukesh Sekar. Excluding Daasan and Dixit, four of them also contributed to the film's background score.

No.	Title	Lyrics	Music	Singer(s)	Length
1.	"Masura Pochey"	Shameer Sultan	Shameer Sultan	Gantasaala Raju	3:31
2.	"Kaatrodu"	Surya Balakumaran	Vishal Chandrasekhar	Anandi Chandrashekhar	3:34
3.	"Cinemakaaran"	Mani Amudhavan	Anthony Daasan	Anthony Daasan	3:39
4.	"Aviyal"	Mani Amudhavan, Charukesh Sekar	Raghu Dixit	Anthony Daasan	2:46
5.	"Many Moods of an Accordion"	Instrumental	Vishal Chandrasekhar	Vishal Chandrasekhar	3:10
6.	"Fight Till Finish"	Instrumental	Javed Riaz	Javed Riaz	2:13

== Marketing and release ==
Aviyal was premiered at the 13th Chennai International Film Festival on 10 January 2016. After receiving positive response from the audience, the makers unveiled the first look and the first teaser on 22 January 2016, by Vijay Sethupathi and Bobby Simha who worked with Karthik Subbaraj in Iraivi (2016) in late January, while a theatrical trailer was unveiled in early February. The film opened up in more than 70 screens in Tamil Nadu, 30 screens in Kerala, and in a few screens in the US on 11 March 2016.

== Reception ==
Baradwaj Rangan, writing for The Hindu, stated "Aviyal, the second anthology, is a huge improvement—not just in terms of craft and performances, but also because the filmmakers don’t expect us to watch with caveats." M. Suganth of The Times of India gave 3.5 out of 5 stars and stated "The shorts in Aviyal are streets ahead of those that formed the first edition, Bench Talkies. They are daring, wacky and fresh. A couple of these films even manage to transcend the made-for-TV visual style of shorts." S. Saraswathi of Rediff gave 2.5 out of 5 stars stating "Karthik Subbaraj’s Aviyal may not be an exotic dish, but does have all the ingredients of a fun and wholesome meal."
