= Oyee =

2016 Indian Tamil-language film by Francis Markus

- Theatrical release poster
- Directed by: Francis Markus
- Written by: Francis Markus
- Produced by: Francis Bastiyan
- Starring: Geethan; Eesha Rebba
- Cinematography: Yuga H
- Edited by: Manikandan
- Music by: Ilaiyaraaja
- Production company: Mark Studio India Private Limited
- Distributed by: Jupiter Films
- Release date: 8 April 2016
- Running time: 127 minutes
- Country: India
- Language: Tamil

Oyee is a 2016 Indian Tamil-language film directed by Francis Markus. The film stars Geethan and Eesha Rebba in lead roles, while Papri Ghosh, Nagineedu, Arjunan, and Sangili Murugan play supporting roles. The soundtrack album and background score were composed by Ilaiyaraaja. with cinematography by Yuga H and editing by Manikandan. The film was released on 8 April 2016.

The film is based on the 2004 South Korean romantic comedy Too Beautiful to Lie.

== Cast ==
- Geethan as Krishna
- Eesha Rebba as Swetha
- Papri Ghosh as Gayathri
- Nagineedu as Krish's father
- Tamil Selvi as Krish's mother
- Arjunan as Krish's uncle
- Sangili Murugan as Krish's grandfather
- Nandha Saravanan
- Karate Raja as Coach
- Neelima Rani as Swetha's sister
- Varsha Kumar as Krish's sister

== Production ==
The team signed up Ilaiyaraaja to compose the film's music. Sivakarthikeyan turned down the film due to date issues and was replaced by Geethan.

== Soundtrack ==
The soundtrack was composed by Ilaiyaraaja.

Oyee

Soundtrack album by Ilayaraaja
- Released: 22 January 2016
- Recorded: Prasad Studios
- Genre: Film soundtrack
- Length: 21:45
- Label: Divo (India)
- Producer: Ilaiyaraaja

Ilayaraaja chronology
Game (2016)	Oyee (2016)	Kida Poosari Magudi (2016)

=== Track listing ===
No.	Title	Lyrics	Artist(s)	Length
1.	"Eden Garden"	Viveka, Premjith	Ranjith, Ramya NSK, Premjith	4:38
2.	"Mudinja Oru Kai Paru"	Viveka	Prasanna, Anitha Karthikeyan	5:17
3.	"Entha Ooru Ponalum"	Ekadesi	Rita, Santhosh Hariharan	5:08
4.	"Mannin Magane"	Ilaiyaraaja	Rahul Nambiar, Ranjith, Prasanna	1:59
5.	"Thendral Varum Vazhiyil"	Viveka	Karthik, Priya Himesh	5:13
