= Savyasachi (2018 film) =

- Theatrical release poster
- Directed by: Chandoo Mondeti
- Written by: Chandoo Mondeti
- Produced by: Naveen Yerneni; Yalamanchili Ravi Shankar; Mohan Cherukuri (CVM)
- Starring: Naga Chaitanya; R. Madhavan; Nidhhi Agerwal; Bhumika Chawla
- Cinematography: J. Yuvaraj
- Edited by: Kotagiri Venkateswara Rao
- Music by: M.M. Keeravani
- Production company: Mythri Movie Makers
- Release date: 2 November 2018
- Running time: 150 minutes
- Country: India
- Language: Telugu
- Budget: ₹30 crore
- Box office: est. ₹22.3 crore

Savyasachi (transl. Ambidextrous) is a 2018 Indian Telugu-language action thriller film written and directed by Chandoo Mondeti. The film features Naga Chaitanya, R. Madhavan (in his Telugu debut), Nidhhi Agerwal (in her Telugu debut) and Bhumika Chawla. It was produced by Naveen Yerneni, C.V. Mohan, and Y. Ravi Shankar under the banner of Mythri Movie Makers. The film has received mixed reviews.

== Plot ==
A bus meets with an accident with 21 passengers.Vikramaditya alias Vikram is the only survivor of the accident. He has vanishing twin syndrome, which makes Aditya, Vikram's invisible twin brother, control his left hand.

A few days after the accident, Vikram is shown to be an advertisement director with his assistant Kittu. The latter gets a client named Chitra. He reveals that she was his love when they were in college. He makes an ad that shows everything from the 80s to the 90s. The ad becomes a hit, and an ad company asks Vikram to take the ad to America. The latter takes the shot in America with Kittu as the director. Vikram then reconciles with Chitra.

When Vikram comes back from America, he learns that his house exploded because of a bombed gas cylinder. He learns that his brother-in-law and his beloved niece Maha, died from that accident. Vikram gets overwhelmingly devastated but then learns that Maha is still alive and tries to find her. He learns that someone kidnapped Maha. With anger, Aditya kills all the men sent by the kidnapper and swears to find him. He tries to get help from a police officer, but gets nothing.

When he goes to a DNA doctor, he learns that the same day when he admitted his pregnant wife to the hospital, the kidnapper sounded like a villager and kidnapped his wife. In order to save his wife, he signs the file in his hand. The next day, Vikram gets a death certificate of the DNA doctor. In order to find out who the kidnapper is, the kidnapper makes Vikram run to all the destinations while he chants devotional chants. While he was running, Vikram drinks water from a local train but later learns that the bottle was sedated, and he starts to sleep. When he is close to finding who the kidnapper is, he falls asleep. Chitra picks him up later on.

Vikram still recalls all the destinations he ran to and then learns that his name starts with A. To find out his connection with him, he searches for everything but learns that the chants he was chanting were marriage chants. He learns that he is Arun Raj Varma, his sister's almost-married husband. Vikram goes to his father to learn why he is like that. He learned that he had a bad life before and not marrying Siri, his sister, made him hungry for vengeance. Vikram investigates the places where he saw the unconscious boy, and the back window was full of dust. He dusts the window and sees the number 21.

Vikram then gets beaten up by a gang sent by Arun, but Aditya saves him. He goes to Arun's hideout, and Vikram and Arun engage in a fight, where Vikram sees Maha is in danger as she was going to fall on a machine. Vikram tries to save her, but Arun hits him with a statue. Vikram gets conscious, and Aditya fractures Arun's hand, beats him, and throws him on a TV. Vikram saves Maha by catching her after she falls. Arun, still injured, throws anchor on Vikram, but Aditya catches and throws back the anchor on Arun, killing him. Before dying, Vikram tells him that the person who creates change is a good person, but a person who destroys humanity is evil.

In the end, Vikram praises Aditya for saving him, but then Aditya touches a stranger, and Vikram apologizes. He pleads Chitra to tell her about the syndrome, but she gets mad at him and leaves him. Vikram then gets mad at Aditya.

== Cast ==
- Naga Chaitanya as Vikramaditya alias Vikram / Aditya (his left arm).
- R. Madhavan as Arun Raj Varma (Voice Dubbed by Vedala Hemachandra)
- Bhumika Chawla as Siri, Vikram/Aditya's sister
- Dishita Sehgal as Mahalakshmi Jr. "Maha", Siri's daughter and Vikram/Aditya's maternal niece.
- Kausalya as Mahalakshmi, Vikram/Aditya, and Siri's mother
- Anand as Mahalakshmi's husband, Vikram/Aditya, and Siri's father
- Nidhhi Agerwal as Chitra
- Bharath Reddy as Siri's husband
- Vennela Kishore as Kittu
- Rao Ramesh as Dr. Rajan
- Thagubothu Ramesh as Nanda Kishore
- Vidyullekha Raman as Tulasi Prasad
- Nagineedu as Arun's father
- Brahmaji as Police Chief
- Viva Harsha as Harsha
- Shakalaka Shankar as Sathi Babu Lavangam
- Satya as Tenali
- Hyper Aadi as Padmanabham
- Rajitha as Shanti
- Sudharshan as Bose
- Eesha Rebba as stranger, in a cameo appearance

== Production and release ==
Savyasachi entered its final stage of filming in July 2018. Post-production was wrapped up in September 2018. The film was originally planned to release in March 2018, but it was postponed to June 2018 and was further delayed to November 2018.

== Soundtrack ==
The music was of the movie was composed by M. M. Keeravani and released by Lahari Music. The track "Ninnu Road Meedha" is a remix of Nagarjuna's classic hit song "Ninnu Road Meeda" from the film Allari Alludu (1993).

Savyasachi

Soundtrack album by M. M. Keeravani
- Released: 26 October 2018
- Recorded: 2018
- Genre: Feature film soundtrack
- Length: 22:33
- Labels: Lahari Music; T-Series Telugu
- Producer: M. M. Keeravani

M. M. Keeravani chronology
Missing (2018)	Savyasachi (2018)	NTR: Kathanayakudu (2019)
External audio
- Official Audio Jukebox on YouTube

Track list
No.	Title	Lyrics	Singer(s)	Length
1.	"Why Not"	Ananta Sriram	P V N S Rohit, Manisha Eerabathini	2:59
2.	"Ninnu Road Meedha"	Ramajogayya Sastry, Veturi	Prudhvi Chandra, Mounima Chandrabhatla	3:40
3.	"Okkarante Okkaru"	Ramajogayya Sastry	Sreenidhi Tirumala	3:26
4.	"Tick Tick Tick"	Ananta Sriram	Hymath, Shreya Goparaju	2:51
5.	"1980,81,82"	Ananta Sriram	Rahul Sipligunj	2:27
6.	"Oopiri Ukkiribikkiri"	Ananta Sriram	Sri Soumya, Sri Krishna, Mohana Bhogaraju	4:00
7.	"Savyasachi"	K Shivadatta, Ramakrishna Koduri	Deepu, Ramya, Rahul, Mohana, Hymath, Mounima Ch	3:10
Total length:				22:33

== Reception ==
=== Box office ===
Savyasachi collected a share of ₹3.29 Crores on opening day in Telugu speaking states. In 2 days, movie collected a total gross of ₹11.70 Crores and share of ₹6.30 Crores worldwide. In its first weekend movie collected a total gross of ₹16 Crores and share of ₹8.50 Crores worldwide.

=== Critical reception ===
On the review aggregator website Rotten Tomatoes, 0% of 5 critics' reviews are positive, with an average rating of 3.5/10.

Firstpost gave 2.5 out of 5 stars stating "The frustrating part about Savyasachi is watching how little it achieves despite having an interesting premise. It could have been cracker of a film, but it isn't quite so. The left hand packs a punch, but the narrative doesn't". The Times of India gave 2.5 out of 5 stars stating "Watch this one if you're a Naga Chaitanya or Madhavan fan, but definitely leave your brains at home for this one". India Today gave 2 out of 5 stars stating "Director Chandoo Mondeti's Savyasachi could have been an intriguing thriller, but it is not. Weak writing and underwhelming characterisations spoil the film".

== Accolades ==
South Indian International Movie Awards

- Nominated - Best Debut Actress - Nidhhi Agerwal
- Nominated - Best Actor in a Negative Role - R. Madhavan
- Nominated - Best Female Playback Singer - Shreya Gopuraju for "Tik Tik Tik"

Radio City Cine Awards Telugu

- Nominated - Best villain - R. Madhavan

66th Filmfare Awards South

- Nominated - Best Supporting Actor - R. Madhavan
