= Enbathettu =

2017 Indian film by Madhan

- Release poster
- Directed by: M. Madhan
- Written by: M. Madhan
- Produced by: A. Jayakumar
- Starring: M. Madhan; Upasana RC
- Cinematography: PG Vetrimaran
- Edited by: Avinash
- Music by: Daya Rathanam; Kingsley
- Production company: JK Movie Makers
- Distributed by: G.S.Cinimas
- Release date: 21 July 2017
- Running time: 123 minutes
- Country: India
- Language: Tamil

Enbathettu (transl. Eighty-eight) is a 2017 Indian Tamil-language crime thriller film written and directed by Madhan starring himself and Upasana RC while Jayaprakash and Daniel Balaji play supporting roles. The film had a theatrical release on 21 July 2017, alongside Vikram Vedha (2017).

== Plot ==
A family-oriented man is caught off-guard when his number is misused by a bunch of gangsters. He then tries to find a way out this trouble, highlighting how people, especially the youth, should use technology wisely and be wary of being too exposed to it mainly the negative impact of technology in our lives.

== Cast ==
- Madhan as Madhan
- Upasana RC as Savitha
- Jayaprakash as Raghuvaran
- Daniel Balaji
- G. M. Kumar
- Manikka Vinayagam as Savitha's father
- Meera Krishnan as Madhan's mother
- Chaams
- Appukutty
- John Vijay as Sakthi Saravanan
- Powerstar Srinivasan
- Gadam Kishan
- Scissor Manohar
- Lollu Sabha Manohar
- Boys Rajan
- Chaplin Balu

== Production ==
This film marks the directorial debut of Rajasekhar's nephew Madhan who previously starred in the Telugu film Parvathipuram (2016). The film was shot in Chennai, Kumbakonam and Kerala. Former Miss India Asia Upasana RC made her Tamil debut with this film.

== Soundtrack ==
Enbathettu

Soundtrack album by Dayarathnam
- Released: 10 March 2017
- Recorded: 2016
- Language: Tamil
- Label: Doopaadoo
- Producer: A. Jayakumar

Dayarathnam composed the songs and Kingsley background score for the film. Madhan Karky bought the audio rights of Enbathettu under his banner, Doopaadoo.

Track listing
No.	Title	Lyrics	Singer(s)	Length
1.	"Meendum Meendum"	Arivumathy	Madhu Balakrishnan	5:11
2.	"Kaalakkaalin"	Madhan Karky	Naresh Iyer & Saindhavi	4:07
3.	"Asaiyaadha Kaatru"	Madhan Karky	Haricharan	3:03
4.	"Gana Padikkum"	Daya	Gana Vinoth	4:49
Total length:				17:01

== Reception ==
A critic from iFlicks called the film below average. A critic from Maalai Malar called the film a hit on the wall.
