= Amrutha Srinivasan =

Indian actress

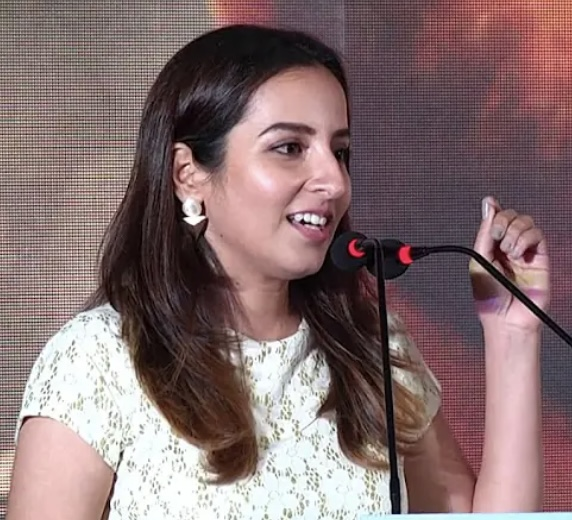
- Amrutha in 2019
- Born: 3 November 1993 (age 33); Chennai, India
- Occupation: Actress
- Years active: 2014–present
- Spouse: Karthik Kumar (m.2021)

Amrutha Srinivasan (born 3 November 1993) is an Indian actress who has appeared in Tamil-language films. She is known for her role in the web series Kallachirippu.

== Career ==
Amrutha Srinivasan made her lead film debut in Aviyal playing the only female protagonist in the film. In 2017, she made her Telugu debut with Mental Madhilo in which she portrayed one of the lead actresses before playing one of the leads in the web series Livin. She later starred in the lead role in the Tamil web series Kallachirippu, for which she garnered acclaim. Regarding her role in the web series, India Today stated that "For once, the heroine isn't a self-sacrificing fantasy. She puts herself and her life first and thinks and behaves like an actual woman." She starred in Dev (2019) as Karthi's friend.

== Personal life ==
Amrutha Srinivasan attended Justice Basheer Ahmed Sayeed College for Women, Teynampet, Chennai and P.S.Senior Secondary School in Mylapore, Chennai.

Amrutha Srinivasan married Karthik Kumar on 13 December 2021.

== Filmography ==
=== Films ===
- All films are in Tamil, unless otherwise noted.

Year	Title	Role	Notes
2014	Kurai Ondrum Illai	Deepika	
2016	Aviyal	Shruti	Segment: Shruthi Bedham
2017	Meyaadha Maan	Priyanka	
2017	Mental Madhilo	Renuka	Telugu film
2019	Dev	Nisha	
2020	Mamakiki	Rita	Released on ZEE5
2021	Irudhi Pakkam	Iyal	
2022	Super Senior Heroes	Inspector Selvi	Directly premiered on Sun TV
2024	Por	Surya Sabapathy	
2024	Pon Ondru Kanden	Tripura Sundari	Released on JioCinema
2026	Tu Yaa Main	Tara Shah	Hindi film
2026	Hi	Lux	

=== Web series ===
Year	Title	Role	Note(s)
2017	Livin	Haritha	
2018	Kallachirippu	Mahati	Released on ZEE5
2022	Anantham	Seetha	Released on ZEE5
2022	Kaiyum Kalavum	Cameo Appearance	Released on SonyLIV
2023	Sweet Kaaram Coffee	Young Deva	Released on Amazon Prime
2025	Good Wife	Sneha Merlin	Released on JioHotstar

Music videos

- Kaalai Pozhudhil
