= Dev (2019 film) =

2019 Indian Tamil film directed by Rajath Ravishankar

- Official Movie Poster
- Directed by: Rajath Ravishankar
- Written by: Rajath Ravishankar
- Produced by: S. Lakshman Kumar
- Starring: Karthi; Rakul Preet Singh; Prakash Raj; Ramya Krishnan
- Narrated by: RJ Vignesh
- Cinematography: R. Velraj
- Edited by: Ruben
- Music by: Harris Jayaraj
- Production company: Prince Pictures
- Distributed by: Reliance Entertainment; Murali Cine Arts (Tamil Nadu)
- Release date: 14 February 2019
- Running time: 159 minutes
- Country: India
- Language: Tamil
- Budget: ₹55 crore

Dev is a 2019 Indian Tamil-language romantic action-adventure film written and directed by Rajath Ravishankar (in his directorial debut). The film stars Karthi and Rakul Preet Singh, with Prakash Raj and Ramya Krishnan playing supportive and pivotal roles in the film. Harris Jayaraj has been roped into score music for the film while cinematography is handled by R. Velraj and editing is done by Anthony L. Ruben. The film marks the first collaboration between Karthi and music director Harris Jayaraj. The film was earlier scheduled to have its theatrical release on the eve of Christmas, and later scheduled to post Thai Pongal but was postponed due to tight race at the box office.

The film was scheduled to have its theatrical release on 14 February 2019 on the eve of Valentine's Day. It premiered in the United States, a day before the original release. The film received lukewarm reviews upon release from critics, which led the makers to trim its duration after releasing.

== Plot ==
Dev Ramalingam, whose family lives and owns a business in India, is a wealthy, adventure-loving young man who pursues new adventures. Dev always takes his best friends, Vicky and Nisha, on adventures worldwide. Vicky, however, wants to lead a regular life and always tries to avoid accompanying Dev on their thrill-seeking trips. He feels that once Dev is busy with a full-time job or at least an active love life, he might not be keen on bothering him anymore. Vicky engages in hot pursuit of potential girlfriends for Dev and comes across Meghna Padmavati, who lives in the United States and is the CEO of a San Francisco startup. Dev is intrigued by Meghna, so he obliges Vicky's pleas and sends her a friend request on Facebook. Dev is reluctant to stalk a girl nowadays, but his friends encourage him to do so anyway. As fate would have it, he eventually finds her in India on an official visit. He tries to woo her, but Meghna finds it challenging to trust men due to the childhood trauma she experienced when her parents divorced, leaving her and her mother, Padmavati, to fend for themselves. She is rude to Dev and brushes off his advances, but eventually understands that Dev is a decent man and is mildly interested in him.

On an impromptu cross-country road trip, the two fall in love despite Meghna's insecurities. Dev reassures her that he will be there for her no matter what. After Dev reaches home, his father, Ramalingam, gives him control over a new business venture that he is initiating, and Dev agrees to take care of it. While Dev is busy with work, he intentionally avoids communicating with Meghna for a few days to surprise her. Meghna's insecurities creep up on her, and she becomes filled with rage and betrayal. Meghna breaks up with Dev immediately. Dev tries to convince Meghna, but she ignores him and leaves the country. Her actions shake Dev, and he meets with an accident, which leaves him critically injured.

He recovers from his injuries and, with his father's advice and motivation, tries to come out of his heartbreak. He eventually trains for the Everest summit trekking, a lifetime goal. While on the trek, an avalanche hits the base camp he is heading for. The authorities are unable to find Dev or his location, and he is feared dead. Meghna watches this on the news. She realises she is still in love with Dev and tries to reach him. At the same time, Dev escapes the avalanche unscathed and continues his climb towards the summit in dangerous conditions. He reaches the summit and becomes unconscious due to exhaustion, but the Indian authorities rescue him on time. When Dev wakes up, he finds that Meghna reached him on time with the authorities.

In a mid-credit scene, and they reconcile. They now have twin babies, whom they take on their newest adventures.

== Cast ==
- Karthi as Dev Ramalingam, an adventure-loving young businessman from an entrepreneur background
- Rakul Preet Singh as Meghna Padmavati, an Indian entrepreneur based abroad in USA
- Prakash Raj as Ramalingam, Dev's father, a rich and influential businessman
- Ramya Krishnan as Padmavati, Meghna's mother
- RJ Vignesh as Vicky "Samosa", Dev's friend who is a stand-up comedian
- Amrutha Srinivasan as Nisha, Dev's friend
- Santhosh Prathap as Harish
- Renuka as Geetha, Dev's aunt
- T. M. Karthik as Stand-up comedian
- Karthik as Ashok (guest appearance)
- Nikki Galrani as Krithika, a news reporter (guest appearance)

== Production ==
The film titled Dev was announced by debutant Rajath Ravishankar who previously served as the assistant of Anurag Kashyap, as his maiden directorial project in March 2018 and it was revealed that Karthi and Rakul Preet Singh would play the lead roles in the film, for the second time, after Theeran Adhigaram Ondru. The film went on floors from 8 March 2018 with the shooting being commenced at Chennai. The first look poster of the film was unveiled by Karthi's brother Suriya on 25 October 2018. It was evident that Karthi playing the titular role with the lead actor returning to act in a road film after 9 years since Paiyaa in 2010 essaying a prominent role and lead actress Rakul Preet Singh as Meghna, an Indian woman entrepreneur.

The film director revealed that the film's plot is inspired from the life of former Indian cricket captain and star all-rounder Kapil Dev. Most of the portions of the film include bike stunt sequences with lead actor Karthi playing the role of a bike lover/enthusiast and they were shot in the roads across India and Nepal especially at the Mount Everest. The scenes of the film were extensively shot in areas such as Chennai, Hyderabad, Bangalore, Mumbai, Pune, Kullu, Manali, Himalayas, Gulmarg, Ukraine and Carpathian Mountains. The shooting was wrapped in around early November 2018 in Ukraine. The climax portions of the film were revealed to have shot in a place called Sisu in the Himalayas mountain range.

== Marketing ==
The first look poster which was released by Suriya on 25 October 2018, features Karthi with a BMW R1200GS superbike model behind. It was evident that the actor is playing an adventure lover in the film. Director Rajath in his interview stated that "We went around and checked out over 30 different models of various superbikes and finally zeroed in on this superbike’s GS1200 model. It’s an off-roader and we were the first ones to order the bike as soon as it got launched this year. It’s quite an expensive one; we’d got it specially ordered in January and it was delivered to us in April. Several actors have ridden superbikes on screen, and we wanted this one to look different. This model complements Karthi’s height and physique. Since Karthi will be on the bike in major portions of the film, we wanted to make sure everything about it was right."

The teaser was released on 5 November 2018, a day before Diwali and received positive reviews from the audience. The official trailer for the film was unveiled by actor Suriya on 31 January 2019. Post-release, the makers announced a contest for the film's promotional purposes, titled "Dev Superbike Contest", from 18 to 25 February 2019, in which two winners will get the superbike used in the film, worth ₹8 lakhs. Naveen Kumar and Aparna from Chennai, were announced as the winners and won the superbike from actor Karthi.

== Music ==
The film's soundtrack and the score are composed by Harris Jayaraj, who is collaborating with actor Karthi and director Rajath for the first time. The album features five tracks with lyrics for the songs were written by Thamarai, Kabilan, Vivek and Rajath. The first single track titled "Anangae Sinungalama" was released on 14 December 2018. The full album was launched on 12 January 2019 at a launch event held at Sathyam Cinemas in Chennai.

The soundtrack of the film's dubbed Telugu version was released on 9 February 2019, at a pre-release event held at Shilpakala Vedika in Hyderabad. Like the original Tamil version, the film's Telugu version has five songs, with one of the songs "Chelliyaa Adugudhama" was released as a single on 30 December 2018.

== Release ==
The film was earlier scheduled to have its theatrical release on 21 December 2018 on the eve of Christmas, and later rescheduled to 11 January 2019 post Thai Pongal but it was postponed, due to a tight race at the box office. The film had its theatrical release on 14 February 2019 on the eve of Valentine's Day. Tamil Nadu theatrical rights for the film were sold to Murali Cine Arts. The United States distribution rights were acquired by Atmus Entertainment and was premiere took place on 13 February 2019.

== Critical reception ==
Soumya Rajendran from The News Minute rated 1 out of 5 stars, stating that "This is a never-ending love saga that resembles a javvu mittai, but isn't half as pleasant as eating one." Srinivasa Ramanujam from The Hindu reviewed it "A film that thinks colourful clothes and pretty locations can make up for the lack of a solid storyline." M Suganth from The Times of India rated 1.5 out of 5, and stated "If you want to describe Dev, you could very well go ahead and call it a misadventure." Behindwoods rated the film 2.25 out of 5 and stated: "Karthi's Dev is a visual delight with a few good moments, but could have been better with an engaging treatment." Gauthaman Bhaskaran of News18 rated 1.5 out of 5 and stated: "Ravishankar's movie is a breezy effort that gets swept off its feet in a blinding blizzard on the icy Himalayas or in the chaotic roads of Chennai." Sify rated 2 out of 5 and reviewed that "Dev is way too predictable to ever surprise you!"

== Home media ==
The satellite rights of the film were bagged by Sun TV, and digital rights of the film were sold to Sun NXT. The film's television premiere took place on 7 October 2019.
