= Utraan =

2020 Tamil film

- Film poster
- Directed by: O. Rajaghajini
- Written by: O. Rajaghajini
- Produced by: O. Rajaghajini
- Starring: Roshan Udayakumar; Heroshini Komali; Priyanka Nair
- Cinematography: Holic Prabhu
- Edited by: S. P. Ahmed
- Music by: N. R. Raghunanthan
- Production company: Sat Cinemas
- Release date: 31 January 2020
- Country: India
- Language: Tamil

Utraan is a 2020 Tamil language film directed by Rajaghajini and stars Roshan Udhayakumar, Heroshini Komali, and Priyanka Nair in the lead roles. P. Ravishankar, Madhusudhan Rao, and Vela Ramamoorthy play pivotal roles.

== Synopsis ==
Utraan begins with two college students, a guy and a girl, falling in love at a men’s college. The girl’s father, a cop, tries to separate them with the help of a dreaded goon. How they protect their relationship is the rest of the story.

== Cast ==
- Roshan Udayakumar as Vijay
- Heroshini Komali
- Priyanka Nair as Kamali
- P. Ravishankar as Principal
- Madhusudhan Rao as Inspector Ganesha Moorthi
- Vela Ramamoorthy as VVK
- Florent Pereira as Arivudainambi
- Aaru Bala as VVK's henchman
- Imman Annachi
- Jangiri Madhumitha
- Kothandam as Tea stall owner
- Supergood Subramani as Police Officer
- Porali Dhilipan as Lawyer
- Saravana Sakthi
- Cheran Raj
- Kadhal Saravanan
- Angadi Theru Sindhu
- Gaana Sudhakar
- Sulakchana
- Thavasi
- Premapriya

== Production ==
Heroshini Komali, known for her mimicry, made her Tamil debut with this film. She plays the daughter of a police officer. Madhusudhan Rao and Vela Ramamoorthy play negative roles while P. Ravishankar plays an important role. Priyanka Nair, who is known for her role in Veyil, plays a college lecturer in the film. Singer Gaana Sudhakar appears in a supporting role in the film.

== Soundtrack ==
The songs were made by N. R. Raghunanthan.

- "Varatchiya Vadiniruntha" - Gaana Sudhakar
- "Kadhale Venandi" - Sudharshan Ashok
- "Yaarivano" - Kapil Nair, Sanjana Kalmanje
- Getha Thookkividu - Dhivakar Santhosh, Velu
- "Kalar Kalara" - Hariharasudhan, Syed Subaan
- "Super Chudithaaru" - Gaana Sudhakar

== Reception ==
The Times of India praised the performances of Roshan Udhayakumar and Madhusudhan Rao. However, the reviewer gave the film one out of five stars and wrote "The already wafer-thin plot is made worse by weak screenplay, unpleasant characters and a bizarre climax". Maalaimalar and Dina Thanthi praised the songs and cinematography.
