= Heroshini Komali =

Indian actress

- Born: Heroshini Ramadugu Komali {} Hyderabad, India
- Other name: Heroshini K Kumar
- Occupations: Actress, model
- Years active: 2016–present

Heroshini Komali is an Indian actress, who has appeared in Telugu and Tamil films. After beginning her career as a television host, she has been seen in films including NTR: Kathanayakudu (2019) and Kaalangalil Aval Vasantham (2022).

== Career ==
Heroshini was born in Khammam to magician Vasanth Ramadugu. She began her entertainment career, aged 14, as a television host for the comedy show Navvulata produced for TV9 Telugu. She worked on the show with her sister Devarshini, often performing mimicry routines of popular Telugu film personalities, and the duo became known in the Telugu entertainment industry as the "Komali sisters". Along with her commitments for the show, she pursued a degree in mass communications at St. Mary's College, Hyderabad.

To prepare for a career in acting, Heroshini signed up for a theatre course, underwent a body transformation programmer at Kunal Gir's Steel Gym, and took a photoshoot from photographer Venky's Photrea company. Heroshini first appeared as an actress in A Aa (2016), portraying the sister of the lead character. She was cast after director Trivikram Srinivas was impressed with her work as a host for the audio launch of Sankarabharanam (2015). She was subsequently cast in Krish Jagarlamudi's biopic films NTR: Kathanayakudu and NTR: Mahanayakudu (both 2019), appearing as Kantamaneni Uma Maheswari, the daughter of actor-politician N. T. Rama Rao.

Heroshini then moved on to work in Tamil films, first starring alongside newcomer Roshan in the action film Utraan (2020), before accepting a role in the romantic comedy Kaalangalil Aval Vasantham (2022).

== Filmography ==
Year	Film	Role	Language	Notes
2016	A Aa	Nandu's sister	Telugu	
2019	NTR: Kathanayakudu	Kantamaneni Uma Maheswari	Telugu	
2019	NTR: Mahanayakudu	Kantamaneni Uma Maheswari	Telugu	
2020	Utraan	Nandini	Tamil	
2022	Kaalangalil Aval Vasantham	Anuradha	Tamil	
