= Oru Thavaru Seidhal =

- Theatrical release poster
- Directed by: Mani Damodharan
- Written by: Mani Damodharan
- Produced by: P. Keerthana
- Starring: M. S. Bhaskar; Ramachandran Durairaj; Namo Narayana; Upasana RC
- Cinematography: Vijaya Krishna; Magesh
- Edited by: Vithu Jeeva
- Music by: K. M. Rayan
- Production company: KMP Pictures
- Release date: 5 April 2024
- Country: India
- Language: Tamil

Oru Thavaru Seidhal (transl. If a wrongdoing is done) is a 2024 Indian Tamil-language drama film directed by Mani Damodharan and starring M. S. Bhaskar, Ramachandran Durairaj, Namo Narayana and Upasana RC. The film was released on 5 April 2024 to mixed reviews.

== Cast ==
- M. S. Bhaskar as Parameshwaran
- Ramachandran Durairaj
- Namo Narayana as Ulaganathan
- Upasana RC as Munishwari
- Paari
- Srithar
- Sura Surendhar
- Thasmiga Lakshman
- Santhosh

== Reception ==
A critic from The Times of India rated the film two-and-a-half out of five stars and wrote that "While its exploration of deepfakes and their potential societal impact offers food for thought, its uneven execution keeps it from being a truly impactful thriller. Fans of crime-comedies with a technological bent might find some enjoyment in this film". A critic from Cinema Express rated the film one-and-a-half out of five stars and wrote that "It is at best a short film, but Mani extends it so much that it loses all its potency". A critic from Times Now rated the film three-and-a-half out of five stars and wrote that "To cut a long story short, this is a film that is highly recommended. This film might not have popular stars or a huge production house backing it but it definitely is a worthy entertainer that deserves your attention and support".
