= Anjali Nair (actress, born 1995) =

Indian actress (born 1995)

- Born: Anjali Nair; Cherthala, Kerala, India
- Occupations: Actress, model
- Years active: 2019–present

Anjali Nair is an Indian actress who has worked in Tamil films. After making her debut in the Tamil film Nedunalvaadai (2019), she has been seen in films including Taanakkaran (2022) and Kaalangalil Aval Vasantham (2022).

== Career ==
Anjali Nair made her acting debut in Nedunalvaadai (2019), and won positive acclaim for her portrayal of a village-based character, with a reviewer from The Hindu calling her performance a "revelation". In addition, a reviewer from The New Indian Express noted that "debutant Anjali Nair holds this film together", while Times of India wrote the film is "supported by decent acting by Anjali".

In 2022, Anjali appeared in three Tamil films - the police drama Taanakkaran, the thriller Yenni Thuniga and the romantic comedy Kaalangalil Aval Vasantham. Anjali also spoke out against film producers who had asked her to change her stage name, owing to the presence of another actress of the same name.

== Filmography ==
Films

Year	Film	Role	Notes
2019	Nedunalvaadai	Amudha	
2022	Taanakkaran	Eeshwari	
2022	Yenni Thuniga	Jennifer	
2022	Kaalangalil Aval Vasantham	Radhe	
2024	Once Upon A Time in Madras	Madhi	
2026	Drones	Rush	
