= Jose Franklin =

Indian film composer

- Born: 27 November 1989 (age 36)
- Origin: Trivandrum, Kerala, India
- Genres: Film score
- Occupation: Film composer
- Instruments: Vocals; keyboard
- Years active: 2016–present
- Labels: Saregama; Trend Music; T-Series
- Website: josefranklin.com

Jose Franklin (born 27 November 1989) is an Indian composer. He primarily scores music for Tamil films. He made his debut as a composer in the 2018 Tamil film Seemathurai.

== Career ==
Jose Franklin is a music director who works in the Tamil Film industry. He composes music and does background score in Tamil movies. He has also composed music for the 2014 Tamil short film called Miracle Babies wrote and directed by Bijoy Lona. He was also associated in other movies like 6 Athiyayam and Kalam (2016).

He composed music for the movie Seemathurai (2018). His next work was in the film Nedunalvaadai (2019).

== Discography ==
As composer

Year	Title	Language	Notes
2016	Kalam	Tamil	Background Score
2016	Kerala Paradiso	Malayalam	
2017	"Nanba Vaa"	Tamil	Single for BGW Studios
2018	6 Athiyayam	Tamil	Background Score for the Chapter Sithiram Kolluthadi
2018	Seemathurai	Tamil	
2019	Nedunalvaadai	Tamil	
2020	Yen Peyar Anandhan	Tamil	
2021	Pei Irukka Bayamen	Tamil	
2021	Mogalturu	Telugu	
2021	Eakam	Telugu	
2022	Yaaro	Tamil	
2022	Take Diversion	Tamil	
2024	Once Upon A Time in Madras	Tamil	

As singer

Song	Film
"Mudhal Murai"	Seemathurai
