= Yaaro =

2022 Indian Tamil-language film

- Theatrical release poster
- Directed by: Sandeep Sai
- Written by: Sandeep Sai
- Produced by: Venkat Reddy
- Starring: Venkat Reddy; Upasana RC
- Cinematography: K. B. Prabu
- Edited by: Anil Krish
- Music by: Jose Franklin
- Distributed by: Trident Arts
- Release date: 4 February 2022
- Running time: 102 minutes
- Country: India
- Language: Tamil

Yaaro (transl. Someone) is a 2022 Indian Tamil-language thriller film written and directed by Sandeep Sai. It is produced by Venkat Reddy under the banner of TakeOk Productions. The film stars producer Venkat Reddy and Upasana RC in lead roles; while CM Bala, Durairaj and Kishore Dev play supporting roles in the film. The film was released on 4 February 2022.

== Plot ==
John (Venkat Reddy), an architect-designer, who lives all alone at his posh villa in ECR is plagued by various happenings around him. Trouble begins when a mysterious stranger enters his life. John spots him often in his house and feels that he is being followed by this man. He gets recurring dreams of some tragic incident and is disturbed by various characters that come knocking at his door. Either they disappear soon enough or are found dead, like the ghost buster sent by a friend who thought the house was haunted. His friends and colleagues seem to be conspiring against him and his girlfriend Pallavi (Upasana RC) cheating on him. He finds a hidden camera in his house that has a clip of two men and a murder being committed. John is panic-stricken and realises his life is in danger and races to unravel the truth.

== Cast ==
- Venkat Reddy as John Mathews
- Upasana RC as Pallavi
- CM Bala as Sundar
- J. Durairaj as Jeeva
- Rajan Iyer as Ganesh
- K. Satyamurthy as Giridhar
- R. Prem Kumar as Senthilnathan
- Akshay as Vinod
- Samragni Rajan as Maggie
- Kishore Dev as Arjun
- Senthil Kumar as Yaaro Mari

== Production ==
The film's lead actor and producer Venkat Reddy and director Sandeep Sai met when working at an IT company in the early 2010s, and were keen to break into Tamil cinema.

== Soundtrack ==
Track listing
No.	Title	Lyrics	Singer(s)	Length
1.	""Mozhiyellam Mounam""	Adithya Suresh	Karthik, MM Manasi	4:38
2.	""En Moga Thirai Yaaro""	Adithya Suresh	Sathya Prakash, MM Manasi	5:17

== Reception ==
The film was released across theatres on 4 February 2022. A critic from the Times of India wrote " It resonates with the mood of the film and adds that mystery quotient. Overall, Yaaro is not a bad film, but it certainly could have been made better. " and gave 2 stars out of 5 stars. A reviewer from Maalai Malar also noted that the film was "Many unnecessary scenes are the film's weakness. Finally the answer to the question of who is the killer is well done."
