= Traffic Ramasamy (film) =

2018 film directed by Vicky

- Theatrical release poster
- Directed by: Vicky
- Produced by: S. A. Chandrasekhar
- Starring: S. A. Chandrasekhar; Rohini; Prakash Raj; Livingston; Ambika
- Cinematography: Kugan S. Palani
- Edited by: Prabhakar
- Music by: Balamurali Balu
- Production company: Green Signal
- Release date: 22 June 2018
- Running time: 119 minutes
- Country: India
- Language: Tamil

Traffic Ramasamy is a 2018 Indian Tamil language biographical drama film directed by Vicky (Vigneswaran Vijayan), in his directorial debut. The film stars veteran film director S. A. Chandrasekhar alongside Rohini, Prakash Raj, Upasana RC, Livingston and Ambika in pivotal roles and features Vijay Sethupathi, Vijay Antony, Khushbu, Seeman, and Kasthuri in special appearances.

The film is based on the real-life story of the veteran social activist K. R. Ramaswamy who received the nickname of Traffic Ramaswamy for his activism in controlling traffic related issues in Tamil Nadu. The music for the film is scored by Balamurali Balu with lyrics written by Kabilan Vairamuthu while the cinematography is handled by Kugan S. Palani.

== Plot ==
Ramaswamy (S. A. Chandrasekhar) is hit by a motorized fish cart and then beaten up by ruffians and left for dead in a gutter. Then we get into his family to meet his wife (Rohini), son in law (Chetan) and his little granddaughter who admires his every move. Ramaswamy's 75th birthday is being celebrated at the house and just at the time of cake cutting a call comes and he leaves abruptly to join in a protest against Tasmac where he threatens to jump from a building top and the authorities yield to him and shut shop. Then the story moves on to explore other protests by the activist and how he gets beaten up often. He files a PIL seeking a ban on the motorized fish carts ("Meen body vandi" in Tamil), that involves an MLA, Inspector, political kingpin and mayor who make arrangements to finish him off.

== Cast ==
- S. A. Chandrasekhar as Traffic Ramasamy
- Rohini as Rukku, Traffic Ramasamy's wife
- Upasana RC as Dr. Fatima
- Prakash Raj as Commissioner V. Velladurai
- Livingston as Lawyer Aavudaiyappan
- Ambika as Judge
- Manobala as Judge
- R. K. Suresh as Daniel
- Chetan as Traffic Ramasamy's son in law
- Mohan Raman as Thozhiladhibar
- Imman Annachi as Mayor Govindan
- Madhan Bob as Lawyer
- Pasi Sathya
- Ammu Ramachandran
- Akila Krishnan

Special appearances

- Vijay Sethupathi as Himself
- Vijay Antony as Himself
- Khushbu as Herself
- Kasthuri as Herself
- Seeman as Himself
- S. Ve. Shekher as a judge

== Production ==
Director Vicky who worked as an assistant director to S. A. Chandrasekhar chose to work on a biopic about Traffic Ramasamy and convinced SA Chandrasekhar to play the lead role of Traffic Ramasamy. The film also marked the full fledged acting debut for S. A. Chandrasekhar in a lead role at the age of 76.

The film started its production venture in December 2017. The production team also recruited Vijay Sethupathi to play a cameo role as a reader of Traffic Ramasamy's book, The One Man Army.

== Release ==
The film was released on 22 June 2018 on Vijay's birthday and received mixed reviews from the critics and audience.

== Soundtrack ==
The soundtrack was composed by Balamurali Balu.

Traffic Ramasamy

Soundtrack album by Balamurali Balu
- Released: 2018
- Genre: Film soundtrack
- Length: 9:30
- Language: Tamil
- Label: Trend Music
- Producer: Balamurali Balu

Balamurali Balu chronology
Iruttu Araiyil Murattu Kuththu (2018)	Traffic Ramasamy (2018)	Ghajinikanth (2018)

Track-List
No.	Title	Lyrics	Singer(s)	Length
1.	"Poraali"	Pa. Vijay, Kabilan Vairamuthu, Muthamil	Deva, Ramya NSK, MC Vickey, Teejay Arunasalam, Varsha Ranjith, Adithya Surendar	3:04
2.	"Komaali"	Kabilan Vairamuthu	Sindhuri Vishal	3:15
3.	"Family"	Pa. Vijay	T. Sreenidhi, Aishwarya Ravichandran	3:11
Total length:				12:56

== See also ==
- List of biographical films
