= Upasana RC =

Indian actress

- Born: Upasana Roy Chowdhury; Vadodara, Gujarat, India
- Other names: Upasana
- Occupations: Actress; television personality
- Years active: 2016–present

Upasana Roy Chowdhury, known professionally as Upasana RC or Upasana, is an Indian actress and television personality who works in the Tamil and Kannada film industries and the Hindi television industry.

== Life and career ==
Upasana was born in a Bengali family in Vadodra and graduated in software engineering from Bangalore. She participated in Elite Miss India, and won the title of Elite Miss India Asia. She made her debut with the Kannada film Colours In Bangalore in 2016 and her Tamil debut Enbathettu in 2017.

Regarding her performance in her debut film, a critic wrote that "Upasana has done a neat job of her role". She has starred in Tamil movies including Brahma.com, Traffic Ramaswamy and Karuthukalai Pathivu Sei. She participated in the reality show Villa To Village and was the second-runner up. She acted in Sony Entertainment show Mere Sai - Shraddha Aur Saburi.

== Filmography ==
=== Films ===
- Note: All films are in Tamil, unless otherwise noted.

Year	Film	Role	Notes
2016	Colours in Bangalore	Nisha	Kannada film; credited as Upasana
2017	Enbathettu	Savitha	credited as Upasana Roy
2017	Brahma.com	Maya	credited as Upasana
2018	Traffic Ramaswamy	Fatima	credited as Upasana Roy
2019	Karuthukalai Pathivu Sei	Bharathi	
2022	Yaaro	Pallavi	
2024	Local Sarakku	Maheswari	
2024	Oru Thavaru Seidhal	Munishwari	
2025	Enai Sudum Pani	Aparna	

=== Television ===
Year	Film	Role	Language	Channel	Notes
2018	Villa To Village	Contestant	Tamil	Star Vijay	Reality show; 2nd runner up
2023	Mere Sai - Shraddha Aur Saburi	Revathi	Hindi	Sony	Ep 1307-1317
Aug 2025 - present	Single Pasanga	Herself	Tamil	Zee Tamil	
