= Traffic Ramaswamy =

Indian social activist (1934–2021)

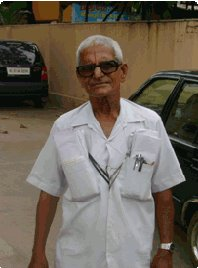
- Born: K. R. Ramaswamy; 1 April 1934; Tamil Nadu
- Died: 4 May 2021 (aged 87); Chennai, Tamil Nadu
- Other names: Sampath, Traffic Ramaswamy
- Years active: unknown–2021
- Known for: Issuing cases against injustice

K. R. Ramaswamy (1 April 1934 – 4 May 2021), referred to by the media as Traffic Ramaswamy, was an Indian public interest litigator and social activist from Chennai, Tamil Nadu. He was a mill worker, a founder member of Tamil Nadu's Home Guard, and a self-appointed traffic policeman.

== Activism ==
Much of his activism relates to regulating traffic in Chennai and filing public interest lawsuits in court. Initially he started unofficially directing traffic at the city's busy Parrys Corner. The local police were pleased with his efforts and provided him with an official identity card. He acquired the nickname Traffic Ramaswamy after that.

He has brought many public interest lawsuits in the Madras High Court as well as Supreme Court of India. In 2007, he was attacked by his opponents' lawyers on the steps of the courthouse. This was not the first time, he has been attacked: in 2002, he was assaulted by fish sellers after he obtained a ban on the use of motorized fish carts. His family later disowned him. He has also had his office ransacked and papers were stolen. However, helped by donations from friends and public he claimed he would continue his fight to make Chennai the most livable and lovable city, his Advocate Mr. S. Ganesan helping him to file PIL case from 2007.

His activism has resulted in the demolition of many illegally constructed buildings in Chennai, restrictions on motorized fish carts, decongestion of major bus routes by banning auto rickshaws from them, and a review of lavish state funding for a feature film (arguing the money could be more properly used for development work). He was accompanied day and night by an armed police bodyguard appointed by the Madras High Court.

His work in the removal and banning of illegally placed hoardings received renewed public interest in September 2019 following the traffic death of Chennai-based engineer Subasri. She had been traveling on her two-wheeler when an illegally placed banner of the All India Anna Dravida Munnetra Kazhagam fell from a height of approximately 15 feet directly in front of her two-wheeler causing her to lose control and fall to the ground and be crushed by a water tanker lorry coming from behind her which was unable to halt in time.

== Death ==
On 4 May 2021, Ramaswamy died in Chennai at the age of 87.

His death was reported to be due to battling complications of COVID-19 at Rajiv Gandhi Government General Hospital, Chennai.

== Popular culture ==
A biopic titled Traffic Ramasamy on the life of Traffic Ramaswamy was directed by debutant Vicky in which the father of Vijay and director S. A. Chandrasekhar had played the titular role.
