= Drones (2026 film) =

- Theatrical release poster
- Directed by: R. Raghav Midharth
- Written by: R. Raghav Midharth
- Produced by: G. M. Morgan
- Starring: Siddhi Idnani; Anjali Nair; Devadarshini; Dravid Selvam; Kuraishi; Cinemawala Sathish; Sasi Selvaraj; RJ Deepak
- Cinematography: Jayanth Sethu Mathavan
- Edited by: Sathish Suriya
- Music by: Hari S. R.
- Production company: GM Morgan Films
- Distributed by: Five Star K. Senthil
- Release date: 16 October 2026
- Running time: 152 minutes
- Country: India
- Language: Tamil

Drones is a 2026 Indian Tamil-language film written and directed by R. Raghav Midharth. The film has an ensemble cast including Siddhi Idnani, Anjali Nair, Devadarshini, Dravid Selvam, Cinemawala Sathish, Kuraishi, RJ Deepak and Sasi Selvaraj. It was released on 16 October 2026.

== Cast ==
- Siddhi Idnani as Prakruthi
- Anjali Nair as Rush
- Devadarshini as the witch
- Dravid Selvam as Kish
- Kuraishi as Black Hole Padmanabhan
- Cinemawala Sathish as Inspector Madhavan
- Sasi Selvaraj as Cerlac Homes
- RJ Deepak as Dush

== Production ==
Drones is Raghav Midharth's second directorial credit after Bun Butter Jam (2025). It is the debut of film producer G. M. Morgan. He said he greenlit the project barely 10 minutes after speaking to Raghav, who narrated several story ideas but Morgan was only in favour of a comedy. The film has been described as bending multiple genres including comedy, fantasy and horror. Cinemawala Sathish, besides acting in the film, also served as creative producer.

== Soundtrack ==
The music was composed by Hari S. R.

Track listing
| No. | Title | Lyrics | Singer(s) | Length |
|---|---|---|---|---|
| 1. | "Asku Macha" | Thamizh Aadhavan, Emcee D | Thamizh Aadhavan | 3:06 |
| 2. | "Terror Error" | Iykki Berry, Gana Gautham, Kelithee | Iykki Berry | 3:36 |
| 3. | "Thala Suthudhey" | Mohan Rajan | Kapil Kapilan, Sanjana Kalmanje | 3:15 |
| 4. | "Dancing Psycho" | Hari S. R. | Hari S. R. | 2:41 |
| Total length: | | | | 12:38 |

== Release ==
Drones was released on 16 October 2026. Five Star K. Senthil distributed the film all over India. Having released one day after the higher-profile Jailer 2, Drones underperformed at the box office despite receiving positive public response, and the makers lamented not being able to secure more screens for the film.

== Reception ==
Abhinav Subramanian of The Times of India gave the film 3/5 stars and wrote, "it never pretends to be anything grander than a goofy fantasy with a kind streak, and that modesty is a large part of why it works". Rohini M of Cinema Express gave the same rating and said, "Drones is an appreciable attempt by a new team to explore a different concept. While the execution leaves room for improvement, the film can be watched with a little patience for its novel approach and the ideas it brings to the table". Manivasagan Namasivayam of DT Next too gave the same rating and wrote, "Drones takes a while to find its direction, and its promising fantasy elements could have been handled better. But the climax brings the story together and gives it an emotional core". Akshay Kumar of The New Indian Express gave a less favourable rating of 2/5 and wrote, "Like the battle between the angel and the witch in the film, your inner angel and demon will constantly be confused about whether to forgive or forget, and both don't bode well for the film".
