= Vishnu Vardhan Induri =

Indian film producer

- Born: Andhra Pradesh, India
- Education: KL University/ Koneru Lakshmaiah College of Engineering, Illinois Institute of Technology
- Occupations: Entrepreneur; Producer

Vishnu Vardhan Induri is an Indian film producer known for his works in Telugu cinema, Tamil cinema, and bollywood. He owns the media production house "Vibri Media" and is the founder of Celebrity Cricket League, and South Indian International Movie Awards. In January 2024, Induri announced a joint venture with Alankar Pandian of Invenio Origin to be called Indian National Cine Academy with the goal of improving collaboration between people across different regional film industries of India.

== Early life ==
Vishnu Induri was born in Andhra Pradesh into a Telugu speaking family. He holds master's degree in computer science from Illinois Institute of Technology.

== Filmography ==
Producer

Year	Film	Language	Notes
2019	NTR: Kathanayakudu	Telugu	
2019	NTR: Mahanayakudu	Telugu	
2021	Thalaivii	Hindi, Tamil	
2021	83	Hindi	
