= Kallachirippu =

Indian TV series

- Official release poster
- Genre: Action; Thriller
- Written by: Rohit Nandakumar
- Directed by: Rohit Nandakumar
- Starring: Amrutha Srinivasan; Vikas; Vignesh Shanmugam; Rajalakshmi; Uma
- Country of origin: India
- Original language: Tamil
- No. of seasons: 1
- No. of episodes: 8 (list of episodes)

Production
- Producer: Karthik Subbaraj
- Production location: India
- Production company: Stone Bench Creations

Original release
- Network: ZEE5
- Release: 23 July – 30 July 2018

Kallachirippu (transl. Fake smile) is a 2018 Indian Tamil language streaming television series. It has a non-linear narrative structure provided and is hosted by Zee5, a video on demand platform. The series was directed by Rohit Nandakumar and produced by popular film director Karthik Subbaraj under his own production company Stone Bench Productions. This was Karthik Subbaraj's first series as a producer and it was the first series for Stone Bench Productions company. The series was released on the streaming platform Zee5 on 23 July 2018 and eventually ended up on 30 July 2018 with only 8 episodes.

It starred Amrutha Srinivasan in the lead role while Vikas, Vignesh Shanmugam, Rajalakshmi, Uma, Maheshwaran and Nandakumar played pivotal roles. This web series is also the second series to be launched by Zee5 network after America Mappillai. The series received positive reviews from critics and audience for portrayal of women in more prominent identical roles than the male counterparts. The theme of series consists of lust, sexuality, pornography, LGBT, abortion and extramarital affairs apart from love and arranged marriage. The series was released as a film in 2023.

== Plot ==
The series follows 24 year old Mahati through a series of misadventures that begin after being forced into an arranged marriage. Then the newly married Mahati accidentally stabs her husband to death in self-defense after a heated argument. She then promptly wipes her blood-spattered face and calls her boyfriend to clean up the mess. This sets off a chain of events that shows the true nature of every character involved in this marriage. The series also involves a love story between a gay couple.

== Cast ==
- Amrutha Srinivasan as Mahati
- Rohit Nandakumar as Indrajith
- Vikas as Ram
- Vignesh Shanmugam as Ram's boyfriend
- Rajalakshmi
- Uma
- Maheshwaran
- Nandakumar
- Cheenu Mohan
- Arun Alexander

== Episodes ==
No. overall	No. in season	Title	Directed by	Written by	Original release date
1	1	"The Dead Jester"	Rohit Nandakumar	Rohit Nandakumar	22 July 2018
2	2	"King Of Smiles"	Rohit Nandakumar	Rohit Nandakumar	23 July 2018
3	3	"Mr. Lipstick"	Rohit Nandakumar	Rohit Nandakumar	23 July 2018
4	4	"Snicker Me Not"	Rohit Nandakumar	Rohit Nandakumar	23 July 2018
5	5	"Smile! Or I'll Shoot!"	Rohit Nandakumar	Rohit Nandakumar	23 July 2018
6	6	"Dimple Kapadia"	Rohit Nandakumar	Rohit Nandakumar	23 July 2018
7	7	"Laughing Stock"	Rohit Nandakumar	Rohit Nandakumar	23 July 2018
8	8	"Smile Please"	Rohit Nandakumar	Rohit Nandakumar	23 July 2018

== Production ==
The idea of producing a web series between Rohit Nandakumar and Karthik Subbaraj was revealed after the release of the anthology film Aviyal in which both of the artists worked for the film together. Nandakumar wrote and acted in one of the six short stories which combined to build up the Tamil anthology film Aviyal while Karthik Subbaraj produced the film under his own production banner Stone Bench Productions. Nandakumar was approached by Subbaraj to make a web series just after the release of Aviyal. Subbaraj approached him as he liked the work of Nandakumar and hinted him to direct a feature film before transforming the concept to make a web series.

== Reception ==
The Indian Express stated that the series is a hard one to review. The story and dialogues are well-written. The conversations between the characters define their relationship and perfectly displays the generation they belong to. The series has a lot of swearing around, so much so that they even have a soundtrack for the same. Nonetheless, the story is good enough to hold the viewers attention.

The News Minute critically reviewed by saying that kallachirippu lacked genuine entertainment. The screenplay is complex, layered and quite unpredictable. Every episode ends with a cliff-hanger, each one subtler than the last, and perhaps, less effective. The lines for the story were well-written, but falls short on the performances of the actors in delivering them.

The Times of India praised the series for its thriller storyline. All the characters in the webseries act of out passion and anger. The show shines the best through dialogues, the way the characters communicate to each other seemed very natural. Each episode of kallachirippu unveils a secret which is quite interesting. Also, the suspense of the murder was carried well towards the end of the series.
