= Kurai Ondrum Illai =

2014 Tamil-language film by Karthik Ravi

- Poster
- Directed by: Karthik Ravi
- Written by: Karthik Ravi
- Starring: Geethan; Haritha Parokod
- Cinematography: Ashok Kumar I. M.
- Edited by: Vishwa N. M.
- Music by: Ramanu (Musicloudstudio & Technology)
- Production company: Pathway Productions
- Release date: 10 October 2014
- Country: India
- Language: Tamil

Kurai Ondrum Illai (transl. No grievances) is a 2014 Indian Tamil-language romantic drama film directed by Karthik Ravi and starring newcomers Geethan and Haritha Parokod.

== Cast ==
- Geethan as Krishna
- Haritha Parokod as Sandhya
- Shruti Pradeep as Krishna's mother
- Vinoth Sagar as Sandhya' father
- Vijayalakshmi as Sandhya's mother
- Amrutha Srinivasan as Deepika
- Muktha Nanjunda (Ajay Raj) as Saravanan

== Production ==
The film was crowdfunded by sixty different investors and was in the making for three years. It was shot in the villages of Kanyakumari and Tirunelveli.

== Soundtrack ==
The music was composed by Ramanu (Ramanujan MK) from Musicloudstudio & Technology. Vijay Sethupathi and Balaji Mohan attended the film's audio launch in Chennai.

- "Ellai Ilam Kizhiye" - Saindhavi, Vaisakh Gopi
- "Kadhal Mazhyil" - Chinmayi Sripada, Chorus: M. M. Manasi, M. M. Monisha, Bhargavi
- "Killi Killi Pakkam"- Haricharan, Archana Ravi (Manasa Holla)
- "Tholaiviniley" - Naresh Iyer, Gurupriya
- "Kurai Ondrum Illai: Payanam" - Nivas
- "Kannan (Reprise)" - Vaisakh Gopi

== Reception ==
Manigandan K. R. of The Times of India gave the film a rating of three-and-a-half out of five stars and wrote that "A bunch of inexperienced youngsters come together to deliver a film that can so easily be cited as a fine example of responsible filmmaking". Malini Mannath of The New Indian Express opined that "it’s a well-intentioned film, with the director making a sincere effort to strike away from the beaten path". The film did not do well at the box office.
