= Kalam (film) =

2016 Tamil film by Robert Raaj

- Theatrical release poster
- Directed by: Robert Raaj
- Written by: Subish Chandran
- Produced by: P. K. Chandran
- Starring: N. L. Srinivasan; Amzath Khan; Lakshmi Priyaa Chandramouli
- Cinematography: Mukesh G.
- Music by: Songs: Prakash Nikki; Score: Jose Franklin; Subish Chandran
- Production company: Arul Movies Production
- Distributed by: Escape Artists Motion Pictures
- Release date: 29 April 2016
- Running time: 105 minutes
- Country: India
- Language: Tamil

Kalam (Tamil pronunciation: [kaɭam]; transl. Field) is a 2016 Indian Tamil-language horror film directed by Robert Raaj and written by Subish Chandran. The film stars N. L. Srinivasan, Amzath Khan, and Lakshmi Priyaa Chandramouli in the lead roles, while Pooja Ramachandran, Madhusudhan Rao, and Nassar play supporting roles. The music was composed by Prakash Nikki with cinematography by Mukesh G. The film was released on 29 April 2016.

== Plot ==
Gautham and Deeksha, along with their daughter, move into a bungalow located in an isolated area. Later, after a few days, they start experiencing paranormal activities in and around the house.

== Cast ==
- N. L. Srinivasan as Nakulan
- Amzath Khan as Gautham
- Lakshmi Priyaa Chandramouli as Dheeksha
- Pooja Ramachandran as Neela
- Madhusudhan Rao as Madhan
- Nassar as Magician
- Kani Kusruti as Housekeeper
- Rekha Suresh as Gautham's mother
- Pop Suresh
- Master Rahil Singhi
- Baby Hiya as Hiya, Dheeksha's daughter

== Production ==
The film was filmed in an ancient house that the makers considered an integral part of the plot. 80% of the film takes place in that house.

== Soundtrack ==
The soundtrack was composed by Prakash Nikki. The film features three songs, one of which "Pudhu Pudhu" is a promotional song. Although Prakash Nikki worked on the background score, only Jose Franklin and Subish Chandran were credited for the score.

Track listing
No.	Title	Lyrics	Singer(s)	Length
1.	"Mayam Kaana Varaiyo"	Kabilan Vairamuthu	Sowmya Ramani Mahadevan	3:09
2.	"Pudhu Pudhu"	Parvathy	Haricharan, Thor Nishanlee, Tha Mystro, Prakash Nikki, Mark Thomas	3:31
3.	"Anuvai"	Kabilan Vairamuthu	Shweta Mohan, Abhay Jodhpurkar	4:47
Total length:				11:27

== Reception ==
M Suganth from The Times of India gave the film three out of five stars and compared the film to a thin crust pizza: "In that sense, you could call Kalam a thin-crust Pizza — has everything you expect, but somehow doesn't seem fullfilling". Sudhir Srinivasan of The Hindu wrote that "Save for the twist that makes you turn back to the screen with mild interest, Kalam is a rather uninspired horror show". A critic from Sify stated, "Kalam is a watchable horror thriller. Not a bad way to spend an evening". A critic from the Deccan Chronicle wrote, "One cannot help but reminded of Karthik Subburaj's thriller Pizza as most part of the film unfolds inside a bungalow. The saving grace is the unexpected twist in the climax and kudos to Robert Raaj for maintaining the suspense factor intact till the end". Malini Mannath of The New Indian Express wrote, "Taking just about 105 minutes of viewing time, the film is engaging in its take and watchable". A critic from Ananda Vikatan wrote that There are so many questions that keep bugging us, like where the thunder is, what the logic is, what the scene is for, who the magic man is, but the answers to all of them at the end make the film clear. A critic from Samayam rated the film three out of five stars and lamented that the plot is a beautiful novelty, but the film has no great strengths.
