= Nedunalvaadai =

2019 Indian film by Selvakannan

- Directed by: Selvakannan
- Written by: Selvakannan
- Produced by: B-Star Productions
- Starring: Poo Ramu; Elvis Alexander; Anjali Nair
- Cinematography: Vinoth Rathinasamy
- Edited by: Kasi Viswanathan
- Music by: Jose Franklin
- Release date: 15 March 2019 (India)
- Running time: 122 Minutes
- Country: India
- Language: Tamil
- Budget: ₹1 crore (US$110,000)
- Box office: est.₹5 crore (US$530,000)

Nedunalvaadai (transl. Long Pleasant Breeze of Winter) is a 2019 Tamil language drama film written and directed by debutant director Selvakannan and produced by B-Star Productions. Inspired by the poem written by Nakkeerar in Sangam literature, the film, as the title suggest, is about the pain of separation — of a man and woman, and a grandfather and his grandson. The movie was a sleeper hit.

This film features Poo Ramu and newcomers Elvis Alexander and Anjali Nair.

== Plot ==
Chellaiah is a simple farmer. He cares so much for the family. He has a son named Kombaiah and a daughter named Pechiamma, who elopes to marry the love of her life, but he is a drunkard and does not care about his family. Unfortunately, Pechiamma left her husband, and she faces challenges to carry on with living with a son named Elango, as well as a daughter, so she returns to her father. Chellaiah, though unhappy about her act of eloping, takes her family in and starts to support them. However, Kombaiah does not like this. Chellaiah loves and supports his daughter's family and takes care of the education of the grandchildren. Elango, while in his study days, falls for a girl in the village named Amudha. Chellaiah advises Elango about how important taking care of the family is and what his responsibilities are. He warns him about the effects of falling in love at this age while he has to be responsible and supportive to the family. Elango is left trying to balance family and love.

== Cast ==
- Poo Ramu as Karuvathevar alias Chellaiah
- Elvis Alexander as Elango
- Anjali Nair as Amudha
- Ajay Natraj as Maruthapandi
- Mime Gopi as Kombiah
- Aindhu Kovilan as Nambithevar
- Senthi Kumari as Pechiamma

== Production ==
=== Development and crew ===
Nedunalvaadai is a crowd funded Tamil film. It's been jointly produced by 50 of his college mates joined to fund and produce this movie. It all started when one of Selvakannan's friends learned that the latter is struggling to get a producer for his directorial venture. He connected all the classmates through WhatsApp group and finally the film happened.

While the film mostly stars newcomers, Selva hired Kaviperarasu Vairamuthu to pen the lyrics. "Vairamuthu sir and editor Kasi Viswanathan are the only two celebrities in the film," he laughs, "He didn't charge us a penny for writing the lyrics. One of the songs he has written for us – Karuvatheva Un Kannellam Kanneera – will be a highlight; he was inspired by his own grandfather while penning it". Theater personality Poo Ramu, who got critical acclaim for his performance in Poo, will be seen as the central character of an aged farmer. Mime Gopi character has shades of grey, Senthikumari are in the supporting cast and several newcomers cast in the film. Selvakannan approached Kasi Viswanathan to make a realistic film.

=== Filming ===
The film is set against the backdrop of Tirunelveli. The shooting of the film took place around the village surrounding Vasudevanallur and the town Puliangudi. Selvakannan says, "we decided to make a film on human emotions and showcase our town in a new light. Though many films have been based in Tirunelveli, we felt none portrayed its true essence".

Selvakannan says that the female character is central theme of the film. Through his film, Selvakannan wanted to question the representation of women in mainstream cinema, “People howl and whistle to scenes that are deeply sexist. It’s easy for men to express their emotions post break-up. But a woman has to go through a lot, internally. These are some of the things I looked into before writing.” Selvakannan says, "The movie deals with two issues. Unlike male offspring who has the right to inherit property, the daughters in the family are not given equal rights and recognition. Secondly, the women are always portrayed in a bad manner and blamed for love failures. It is not so. I have reasoned out their side of reality in the film".

== Soundtrack ==
All the songs are penned by Vairamuthu. Jose Franklin is the music director.

Nedunalvaadai

Soundtrack album by Jose Franklin
- Released: 6 September 2017
- Genre: Feature film soundtrack
- Length: 20.37
- Language: Tamil
- Label: Saregama

Jose Franklin chronology
Seemathurai (2018)	Nedunalvaadai (2017)	Yen Peyar Anandhan (2020)

No.	Title	Lyrics	Singer(s)	Length
1.	"Karuvatheva"	Vairamuthu	Deepak	5:12
2.	"Yedho Aagippochu"	Vairamuthu	Shweta Mohan & Yazin Nizar	5.40
3.	"Ore Oru Kanpaarvai"	Vairamuthu	Yazin Nizar & Purnima Krishnan	5.39
4.	"Thanga Kavadi"	Vairamuthu	Bala, Kalakkal Kaviya & Sugandhi	4.12

== Critical response ==
Srivatsan S of The Hindu wrote, "A strong sense of rootedness prevails over Selvakannan’s crowdfunded movie". India Today gave 3.5 out of 5 stars for Nedunalvaadai and wrote, "Debutant director Selvakannan gifts a pleasant surprise With the brilliant performance of Poo Ramu as an ageing farmer and the engaging writing of Selvakannan, Nedunalavadai, starring many newcomers, is definitely a surprise this month. Watch the film for its story and performances." The Times of India gave the film 3 out of 5 and wrote, "Despite a few shortcomings, the film will work for those who love rural dramas which have ample dose of family bonding and relationships." New Indian Express said, "Superlative performances elevate this rural drama".
