= Karunakaran =

Karunakaran may refer to:

- K. Karunakaran (1918–2010), Indian politician and member of the Indian National Congress (INC)
- Dr. T. Karunakaran (1946–2019), Indian academic, social reformer, rural developer, founder of AGRINDUS
- Karunakaran (actor), Tamil film actor
- A. Karunakaran (born 1971), Telugu film director
- C. N. Karunakaran (1940–2013), Indian painter, illustrator and art director
- C. O. Karunakaran (1892–1970), bacteriologist and microbiologist
- G. Karunakaran (born 1963), Sri Lankan Tamil politician
- P. Karunakaran (born 1945), Indian communist politician
- Karunakaran (Malayalam writer), Malayalam writer
