= Seemathurai =

2018 Indian Tamil-language film

- Directed by: Santhosh Thyagarajan
- Written by: Santhosh Thyagarajan
- Produced by: E. Sujaykrishnaa
- Starring: Geethan; Varsha Bollamma
- Cinematography: Gnana Samantham
- Edited by: Veera Senthilraj
- Music by: Jose Franklin
- Production company: Buvan Media Works
- Release date: 7 December 2018
- Country: India
- Language: Tamil

Seemathurai is a 2018 Indian Tamil-language romantic drama film directed by Santhosh Thyagarajan in his film debut. The film stars Geethan and Varsha Bollamma in the lead roles.

== Cast ==
- Geethan as Marudhu
- Varsha Bollamma as Poorni
- Adesh Bala
- Viji Chandrasekhar as Marudhu's mother
- Kayal Vincent
- Mahendran
- Nellai Siva as M. Muthukumar

== Production ==
The film was shot for 45 days around Pattukkottai, two months before Cyclone Gaja took place. Varsha Bollamma was trained to use a southern Tamil Nadu accent for the film.

== Soundtrack ==
Soundtrack was composed by Jose Franklin.

- "Thanjavur Melathukku" - Velmurugan
- "Aagayam Enna" - Shreya Ghoshal, Swetha Mohan, K.G. Ranjith
- "Mudhal Murai" - Jose Franklin
- "Karuvalan Kaattukku" - Sathyaprakash, Anitha Karthikeyan

== Reception ==
The Times of India gave the film two out of five stars stating that "This rural romance, seems to be trying to another Kalavaani, but the a clichéd treatment works against it.". Cinema Express wrote "Seemathurai is a generic love story highlighted by its final act, an inconsequential hero and some effective performances".
