= Brahma.com =

2017 Indian film by P. S. Vijayakumar

- Theatrical release poster
- Directed by: P. S. Vijayakumar
- Written by: P. S. Vijayakumar
- Produced by: Milana Karthikeyan
- Starring: Nakkhul; Ashna Zaveri
- Cinematography: Deepak Kumar Padhy
- Edited by: V. J. Sabu Joseph
- Music by: Siddharth Vipin
- Production company: Ganesh Dream Factory
- Release date: 15 December 2017
- Country: India
- Language: Tamil

Brahma.com is a 2017 Indian Tamil-language fantasy comedy film directed by Vijaykumar, starring Nakkhul and Ashna Zaveri in the leading roles, while Neetu Chandra, Upasana, Karthikeyan, Siddharth Vipin, K. Bhagyaraj, and Rajendran play pivotal characters. The film features music composed by Siddharth Vipin, editing by V. J. Sabu Joseph, and cinematography by Deepak Kumar Padhy. The film was released on 15 December 2017.

== Plot ==
Kameshwaran "Kamu" is a talented advertisement film director who works in a company owned by Vanangamudi, in which Kamu's cousin Rameshwaran "Ramu" is the CEO. Despite being more talented and skillful than Ramu, Kamu does not become the CEO because of a small mistake from his past. He rues over this issue and blames Lord Brahma for making his life not as he wished for. Kamu is in love with Manisha, an advertisement model, and she too reciprocates his feelings.

On Kamu's birthday, he happens to visit a temple for performing puja. As the temple closes, the temple priest asks Kamu to perform puja at Brahma's sanctum. Kamu hallucinates that he is in Brahma Lok and blames Brahma for all His actions and miseries He creates for people and prays for a better life. During the break at Kamu's birthday party, he gets a friend request on Facebook from a user named Brahma, who actually happens to be Lord Brahma. Thinking that someone is playing a prank on him, he accepts the request and begins a chat. The account then provides photos from his childhood up to the present moment as proof. Kamu is shocked by this and informs his friends Jagan and Maya. They send a friend request to the account and similarly get their old photos. Kamu remembers that the temple priest blessed him with the fulfillment of his wishes.

Maya unknowingly presses the G and H keys on the laptop, reversing everything that happened in their lives until a year ago. Kamu is sent one year back to the very moment where he made the mistake that made him not get the CEO position. He reverses his mistake and becomes the CEO, while Ramu becomes the director. Just then, Manisha enters the office and heads straight away to Ramu's office, as she is in love with him. Kamu feels bad that he lost her and returns home, amazed at his new home. Just then, he is picked up by his boss's henchmen for his engagement, set to marry his boss's daughter to his dismay. The boss senses something fishy and shows him a video that Kamu is the CEO just because he has agreed to marry the boss's daughter and has signed an agreement on it.

Dejected, Ramu visits the Brahma temple and begs God to reverse everything and foresees the future on his laptop and is shocked that he is about to marry his boss's daughter, in ICU clothes. He stabs himself as if it would end all his agony. The next morning, he wakes up and is being carried in a wheelchair by his boss's henchmen to his marriage, in ICU clothes. He asks permission to change his clothes and escapes thereafter to the place where Manisha is about to register to marry Ramu. Kamu repeats the dialog that Manisha told him during their meeting.

Just then, the G and H keys were pressed by two raindrops, reversing his life to normal. The boss's henchmen arrive and take Ramu instead. Kamu and Manisha goes to the Brahma temple and now realises that God made things as they are for a reason. As they are about to leave, Kamu laughs at another man who comes running to the temple just as it is about to close. The priest sarcastically asks Kamu to leave as his work is finished.

== Cast ==
- Nakkhul as Kameshwaran
- Ashna Zaveri as Manisha
- Neetu Chandra as Neetu Chandra
- Siddharth Vipin as Rameshwaran
- E. Karthikeyan as Veeramudi, Vanangamudi's son
- K. Bhagyaraj as Gurakkal
- Motta Rajendran as Vanangamudi
- Jagan as Jagan
- Upasana as Maya
- Prema Priya as Karkuzhali, Vanangamudi's daughter
- Sona as Vanangamudi's wife
- Kausalya as Kamu's mother
- M. J. Shriram as Parameshwaran, Kamu's father
- Bala Saravanan in a guest appearance

== Production ==
In early March 2016, Nakkhul revealed that he had signed a film to be directed by Vijayakumar and that the film would be a fantasy comedy. Sakshi Agarwal revealed that she would also work on the film and collaborate again with the director who had introduced her in Ka Ka Ka Po (2016), though she was later left the project. The film began production in late September 2016, with Ashna Zaveri joining the cast to play the lead actress. Comedians Rajendran and Siddharth Vipin joined the team the following month before the team moved to shoot in Pondicherry. The film was also shot in Chennai, Hong Kong, and Bangkok.

== Soundtrack ==
The soundtrack was composed by Siddharth Vipin.

Brahma.com

Soundtrack album by Siddharth Vipin
- Released: 2017
- Genre: Film soundtrack
- Language: Tamil

Siddharth Vipin chronology
Muthina Kathirikai (2016)	Brahma.com (2017)	1971: Beyond Borders (2017)

Song name	Singers
"I Am CEO"	Benny Dayal, Nikhita Gandhi
"Unnale Ellame Unnale"	Shekhar Ravjiani, Chinmayi
"Un Pera Sollu Un Oora Sollu"	Sudharshan Ashok, Vijay Gopal, Sharanya Srinivas
