= Taanakkaran =

2022 Indian Tamil film

- Film poster
- Directed by: Tamizh
- Written by: Tamizh
- Produced by: S. R. Prakash Babu; S. R. Prabhu; P. Gopinath; Thanga Prabaharan R.
- Starring: Vikram Prabhu; Anjali Nair; Lal
- Cinematography: Madhesh Manickam
- Edited by: Philomin Raj
- Music by: Ghibran
- Production company: Potential Studios
- Distributed by: Disney+ Hotstar
- Release date: 8 April 2022
- Country: India
- Language: Tamil

Taanakkaran (transl. Circle Inspector) is a 2022 Indian Tamil-language action drama film written and directed by Tamizh (in his directorial debut) and produced by Potential Studios. The film stars Vikram Prabhu, with Anjali Nair, Lal, M. S. Bhaskar, and Madhusudhan Rao in supporting roles. The film is based on real life incidents from 1997 related to police training.

Taanakkaran was released directly on the streaming platform Disney+ Hotstar on 8 April 2022. The film won the Tamil Nadu State Film Award for Third Best Film. & Vikram Prabhu won Tamil Nadu State Film Award for Best Actor,

== Plot ==
The story is set in 1999 where Arivu (Vikram Prabhu) is a young cop who just got selected into Tamil Nadu Police topping his batch and is sent to a Police Recruit School (PRS) for training. He is joined by a few of his friends and soon befriends other trainees of his batch. A few amongst them are much older trainees, who cleared their selection rounds in 1982, but due to some political reasons, could not get placed. They all get placed only in 1999 following a long court process. Most of the trainers of the school see these old trainees as unfit men and constantly mock them. However, Arivu supports them.

The PRS is run by Inspector Muthupandi (Madhusudhan Rao), a stern but corrupt officer, who is feared by all. One of his aides Eshwaramurthy (Lal), is a very strict and ruthless trainer, who has a record of winning all the parades and even resulting in the deaths of a few trainees in the name of extreme training, known as Extra Drill (ED). On the very first day of training, one of Arivu's friends from the '82 batch, faces the wrath of Muthupandi after he complains about the lack of proper toilet facilities in the campus. Soon, Eshwaramurthy starts seeing Arivu as his rival, and warns him that he will not allow him to pass the training. He devices many tactics to brutally punish and demotivate Arivu and his batch. Eshwaramurthy warns Arivu and his friends to leave the training and find some other job. However, Arivu stays stubborn in continuing the training and also motivates his fellow batchmates to fight without fearing for Eshwaramuthy. Eeshwari (Anjali Nair) is a constable in PRS who develops an affection towards Arivu. Mathi (Bose Venkat) is a good Inspector who handles law classes for the trainees and has a good image on Arivu.

One of the trainees from ’82 batch dies due to extra drill punishment given by Eshwaramurthy leading to riots inside the PRS. Arivu complaints to the Commandant about the mistakes that keep happening at the PRS such as bribes, favouritism and extreme punishments in the name of training. Arivu and his friends are now moved out of Eshwaramuthy's team to Sellakkannu's team (MS Bhaskar) who happens to be a kind-hearted trainer. However, Sellakkannu gets no respect from his fellow police officers owing to his straightforward nature making him stay in lower ranks without promotion for several years. Sellakkannu advises Arivu to leave the police job as honesty is not rewarded here, but Arivu does not agree. A small flashback is shown for Arivu's strong determination to become a police officer, which was the dream of his father Rajendran (Livingston) who died when Arivu was young.

Arivu wants to teach Eshwaramurthy a lesson by breaking his over confidence of winning all the parades for consecutive years. Eshwaramurthy challenges Arivu that he would quit his job if Arivu's team won the competition. Similarly, Arivu agrees that if Eshwaramuthy wins, then he would leave the police force. Meanwhile, Muthupandi secretly tries to strike a deal with Sellakkannu to make Arivu lose in the parade competition by providing wrong and confusing commands and promises a promotion for Sellakkannu. However, Sellakkannu supports Arivu in the final parade and his team wins. But the senior police officers still declare Eshwaramurthy's team to be the winners as they don't want to break the legacy. However, Eshwaramurthy understands that he has lost to Arivu and feels embarrassed in front of Arivu and his team members. Arivu feels dejected and decides to leave the police force, However, Mathi motivates Arivu that the current police system is highly corrupted, and this can be changed only if energetic youngsters like Arivu could join the police force. Arivu agrees and decides to continue in police force hoping that a change could be brought sometime.

== Cast ==
- Vikram Prabhu as Arivazhagan (Arivu)
- Anjali Nair as Constable Eeshwari
- Lal as Assistant Drill Instructor Eshwaramurthy
- M. S. Bhaskar as Assistant Drill Instructor Sellakkanu
- Bose Venkat as Inspector Mathi
- Madhusudhan Rao as Inspector Muthupandi
- Livingston as Rajendran, Arivu's father
- Pavel Navageethan as Kadar Basha, Arivu's friend
- Nitish Veera as Councillor Sahul Bhai
- Karthick Kannan as Murugan, Arivu's friend
- Lingesh as Manimaran, Arivu's friend
- Uday Mahesh as Nandhakumar
- Madhankumar Dhakshinamoorthy as Nagachi Mani, a money lender

== Soundtrack ==
The soundtrack and score is composed by Ghibran.

Track listing
No.	Title	Lyrics	Singer(s)	Length
1.	"Kattikoda"	Chandru	Shweta Mohan	3:21
2.	"Thudithezhu Thozha"	Chandru	Shenbagaraj, Aravind Srinivas, Narayanan, Sarath Santosh	3:51

== Release and reception ==
Taanakkaran was released directly on the streaming platform Disney+ Hotstar on 8 April 2022. M. Suganth of The Times of India gave it 3 out of 5 stars and wrote "Vikram Prabhu comes up with a sturdy performance, capturing Arivu's physicality very well. MS Bhaskar shines as a veteran cop who is paying the price for an insubordination years ago, and Lal makes us hate his character. Bose Venkat, as Madhi, an honest cop who wants to turn the recruits into good policemen despite being aware of the system's flaws, pitches in with an empathetic performance. These performances hold the film together and keep us engaged." Navein Darshan from Cinema Express gave it 3.5 out of 5 stars and said that "A powerful film about a lesser-known problem ' Bharathy Singaravel from The News Minute noted that "Lal in well-written roles is a phenomenal actor. His Yama raja in Karnan showed off the depth of his skill and ability for nuance. Unfortunately, nuance is exactly what’s missing in his characterization". Janani K from India Today gave 3 out of 5 rating and noted that "Taanakkaaran is an engaging cop drama that is refreshing to watch." Thinkal Menon from OTTPlay noted that "Watch it if you're a fan of realistic cop dramas that effectively address serious issues in society" and rated it 3 out of 5.
