= T. Sreenidhi =

Sreenidhi Tirumala
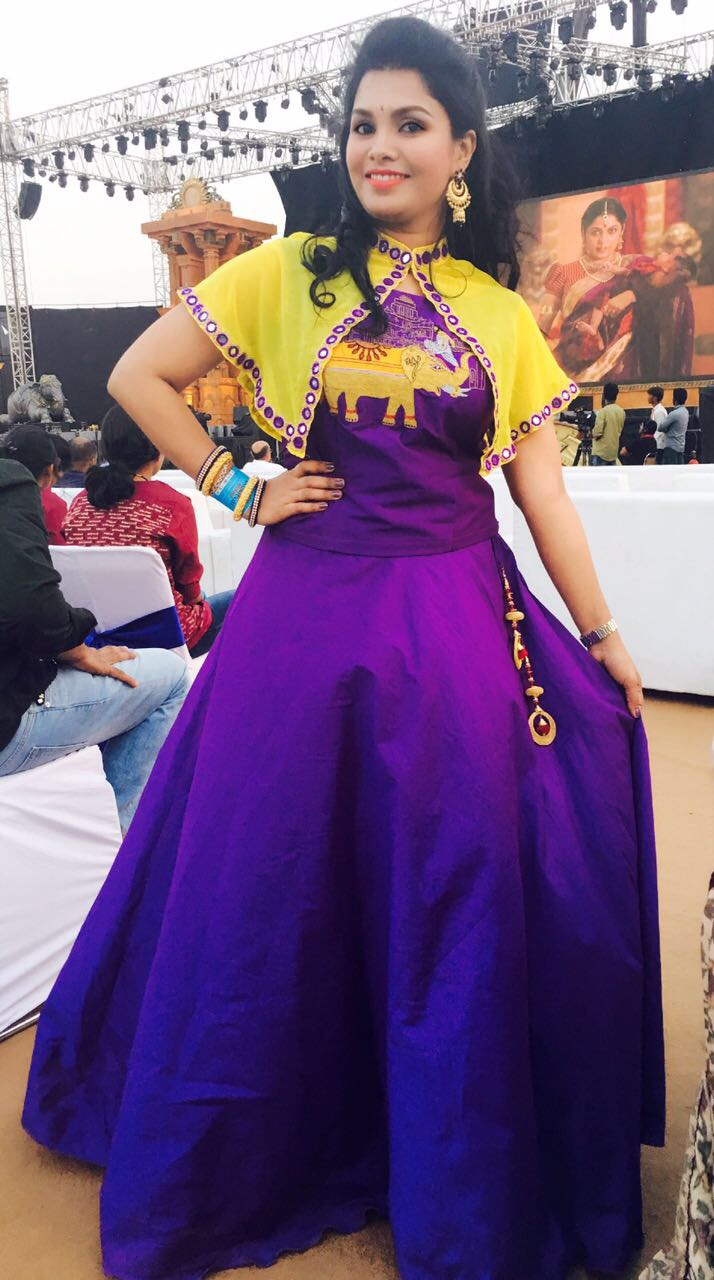
- Sreenidhi at Baahubali Pre-Release in 2017
- Born: Tirumala Sreenidhi; 26 January 1990 (age 36); Anantapur, Andhra Pradesh, India
- Spouse: Venkatesh Bhaskar
- Musical career
- Genres: Carnatic music; Classical music; Playback Singer
- Occupations: Singer, Carnatic Vocalist
- Years active: 2012–present
- Website: sreenidhimusic.com

Sreenidhi Tirumala (born 26 January 1990) is an Indian singer. Trained under vocal coach Nedunuri Krishnamurthy, she has received many accolades and honors.

== Discography ==
Song	Film	Language	Music director	Year
Kathaa Naayaka(Female)	NTR Biopic	Telugu	M. M. Keeravani	2018
Bhantureethi Koluvu	NTR Biopic	Telugu	M. M. Keeravani	2018
Rajarshi	NTR Biopic	Telugu	M. M. Keeravani	2018
Dulhara Thumara	Kavacham	Telugu	S. Thaman	2018
Okkarante Okkaru	Savyasachi	Telugu	M. M. Keeravani	2018
Ardham Leni Navvu	Chal Mohan Ranga	Telugu	S. Thaman	2018
Kannaa Nidurinchara	Baahubali 2: The Conclusion	Telugu	M. M. Keeravani	2017
Akhilanda Koti	Om Namo Venkatesaya	Telugu	M. M. Keeravani	2017
Kaliyuga Vaikuntapuri	Om Namo Venkatesaya	Telugu	M. M. Keeravani	2017
Brahmothsava	Om Namo Venkatesaya	Telugu	M. M. Keeravani	2017
Govindha Hari Govindha	Om Namo Venkatesaya	Telugu	M. M. Keeravani	
Sarala Virala	Shivam	Kannada	Mani Sharma	2015
Chinnamatedo	Tippu	Telugu	Mani Sharma	2015
Gunnamamidi	Idi mamulu prema katha kadu	Telugu	Quddus	2012
Telugamaye	Telugamaye	Telugu	Vandemataram Srinivas	2012
Evaro Neevevaro	Maa Abbayi Engineering Student	Telugu	Chinni Charan	2012

== Compositions ==
Song	Ragam	Album	Year	Remarks
Panchendriyamulala Panchaboothamulala		Annamayya Pataku Pattabhishekam	2016	
Oyamma		Annamayya Pataku Pattabhishekam	2016	
Balalaku Bala		Manidweepam	2016	
Bhagavathi Bhavatarini	Atana	Manidweepam	2016	
Raga Ranjitham		Manidweepam	2016	
Manidweepam		Manidweepam	2016	
Brahmandanayaki		Manidweepam	2016	
Sowbhagya lakshmi		Manidweepam	2016	
Bhoopala Bhuvaneswari		Manidweepam	2016	
Amba Parameswari		Manidweepam	2016	
Maatanga Kanyakaku		Manidweepam	2016	
Vasudevuda		Annamayya Pataku Pattabhishekam	2016	
Yetuvanti Mohamo		Annamayya Pataku Pattabhishekam	2016	
Annitiki Nodayadavaina		Annamayya Pataku Pattabhishekam	2016	
Kaivalyamuna kante		Annamayya Pataku Pattabhishekam	2016	
Shobana Pademu		Annamayya Pataku Pattabhishekam	2016	
Yele Jaanathanala		Annamayya Pataku Pattabhishekam	2016	
Deva Neeve		Annamayya Pataku Pattabhishekam	2016	
Komma Kadu Javarala		Annamayya Pataku Pattabhishekam	2016	
Satata Virathudu		Annamayya Pataku Pattabhishekam	2016	
Magaroopunu aadaroopunu		Annamayya Pataku Pattabhishekam	2016	
Vaagadeeswari Sarade	Vaagadeeswari		2013	

== Competitions ==
- Raga Ranjani, the team formed and led by Sreenidhi, won the title of the Bhajan Samraat Season-2, a talent show on Nama sankeerthanam on Sri Sankara TV.
- Title winner of Idea Super Singer - 1 and Idea Super Singer -3 series, Paadalani Undhi conducted by MAA TV.
