= N. Bhaskar Rao =

Indian politician

Nekkanti Bhaskar Rao

Member of Rajya Sabha
- In office 2 July 2016 – 1 July 2022
- Preceded by: Bhupinder Singh, BJD
- Constituency: Odisha

Personal details
- Born: 23 July 1953
- Party: BJD (2000 - 2025) (Biju Swabhiman Mancha Party) (Since September 2025))
- Spouse: Nekkanti Chamundeswari Devi

N. Bhaskar Rao is an Indian politician from the state of Odisha. He was a leader of the Biju Janata Dal until he resigned in 2025. His hometown is Rayagada. He was also Deputy Chairman of Odisha state's planning board and is also an industrialist.

In 2016, he was the candidate of the party for the biennial Rajya Sabha elections. He was elected unopposed with Prasanna Acharya and Bishnu Charan Das. Born on 23 July 1953 he completed his B.Com degree from Alagappa University of Tamil Nadu in 2008.
