= List of Tamil films of 2023 =

This is a list of Tamil cinema films released in 2023.

== Box office collection ==
The following is the list of highest-grossing Tamil films released in 2023. The rank of the films in the following table depends on the estimate of worldwide collections as reported by organizations classified as green by Wikipedia. (Note: See WP:RSP, WP:ICTFSOURCES) There is no official tracking of domestic box office figures within India.

Highest grossing Tamil cinema films of 2023
Rank (Note: Sorted based on the lowest value when figures are presented as a range, and for the same value, the older item is given a higher order.)	Title	Production company	Worldwide gross	Ref.
1	Jailer	Sun Pictures	₹605–650 crore	(Note: Jailer's reported worldwide grosses vary between ₹605 crore (India Today) – ₹650 crore (Firstpost, Cinema Express))
2	Leo	Seven Screen Studio	₹595–615 crore	(Note: Leo's reported worldwide grosses vary between ₹595 crore (Box Office India) – ₹615 crore (Deccan Chronicle).)
3	Ponniyin Selvan: II	Madras Talkies; Lyca Productions	₹342–346 crore	(Note: Ponniyin Selvan: II's reported worldwide grosses vary between ₹342 crore (Cinema Express) – ₹345 crore (News18) – ₹346 crore (DNA India))
4	Varisu	Sri Venkateswara Creations; PVP Cinema	₹290–293 crore	(Note: The New Indian Express stated that Varisu grossed ₹290 crore worldwide. Box Office India stated that the film grossed ₹293 crore worldwide in its lifetime.)
5	Thunivu	Bayview Projects; Zee Studios	₹180–200 crore	(Note: Thunivu's reported worldwide grosses vary between ₹170–180 crore (India Today and The Economic Times) – ₹200 crore (News18))
6	Vaathi (Note: The film was produced in both the Tamil and Telugu languages, according to the filmmakers.)	Sithara Entertainments	₹105 crore	
7	Mark Antony	Mini Studio	₹100 crore	
8	Maaveeran	Shanthi Talkies	₹75 crore	
9	Por Thozhil	Applause Entertainment	₹50 crore	
10	Viduthalai: Part 1	RS Info Entertainment	₹40 crore	

== Released films ==
=== January – March ===
Opening		Title	Director	Cast	Production	Ref.(s)
J A N	6	Dear Death	Prem Kumar	Santhosh Prathap, Jay, Sridhar Venkatesan	SNR Films	
J A N	6	Vindhya Victim Verdict V3	Amudhavanan	Varalaxmi Sarathkumar, Paavana Gowda, Esther Anil	Team A Ventures	
J A N	11	Thunivu	H. Vinoth	Ajith Kumar, Manju Warrier, Samuthirakani	Bayview Projects LLP	
J A N	11	Varisu	Vamshi Paidipally	Vijay, R. Sarathkumar, Srikanth, Shaam	Sri Venkateswara Creations	
J A N	20	Vallavanukkum Vallavan	Vijay Tesingu	Simha, Sshivada, Pooja Devariya	Sri Thenandal Films	
J A N	26	Beginning	Jagan Vijaya	Vinoth Kishan, Gouri Kishan, Rohini	Lefty Manual Creations	
J A N	27	Meippada Sei	Velan	Aadhav Balaji, Madhunika, Jayapalan	SR Harshith Pictures	
J A N	28	Kalathil Vendraal	Dharmar Periyasamy	Dharmar Periyasamy, Idhayarooban, Uthiriyan	Thaaimann Thiraiyagam	
F E B	3	Bommai Nayagi	Shan	Yogi Babu, Hari Krishnan, Subatra Robert	Neelam Productions	
F E B	3	Michael	Ranjit Jeyakodi	Sundeep Kishan, Vijay Sethupathi, Divyansha Kaushik	Karan C Productions	
F E B	3	Naan Kadavul Illai	S. A. Chandrasekhar	Samuthirakani, Sakshi Agarwal, Saravanan	Star Makers	
F E B	3	Naan Yaar Theriyuma	V. S. Balamurugan	Raaj Varma, Sreenithi, Miyasree Soumya	Sri Masani Amman Pictures	
F E B	3	Run Baby Run	Jiyen Krishnakumar	RJ Balaji, Aishwarya Rajesh, Isha Talwar	Prince Pictures	
F E B	3	Thalaikoothal	Jayaprakash Radhakrishnan	Samuthirakani, Kathir, Vasundhara	Y NOT Studios	
F E B	3	The Great Indian Kitchen	R. Kannan	Aishwarya Rajesh, Rahul Ravindran, Nandakumar	RDC Media	
F E B	10	Dada	Ganesh K. Babu	Kavin, Aparna Das, Bhagyaraj	Olympia Movies	
F E B	10	Kodai	Raajaselvam	Karthick Singa, Anaya Lakshmi, Robo Shankar	SS Pictures	
F E B	10	Koottam	V. Barathi	Nishanth, Manoj, Karthik, Dinesh	I Movies	
F E B	10	Ninaive Nee	Murugan	Ramaranjan, Sushma, Kovai Senthil	Madurai Veeran Pictures	
F E B	10	Varnashramam	Sukumar Alagarsamy	Ramakrishnan, Cynthia Lourde, Sriram Karthik	Cynthia Production House	
F E B	10	Vasantha Mullai	Ramanan Purushothama	Simha, Kashmira Pardeshi, Arya	SRT Entertainments	
F E B	10	Vidhi Enn 3	Broadway Sundar	Jebasingh, Murugan, Senguttuvan	Broadway Picture Studio	
F E B	17	Bakasuran	Mohan G. Kshatriyan	Selvaraghavan, Natty, Radharavi	G M Film Corporation	
F E B	17	Moondram Pournami	Raveendhar	Janaki Ram, Preethi Varma, Livingston	Maha Movie Makers	
F E B	17	Vaathi	Venky Atluri	Dhanush, Samyuktha, Sai Kumar	Sithara Entertainments	
F E B	24	Kuttram Purinthal	Disney	Aadhik Babu, Archana, Abhinaya	Amaravathy Film Studios	
F E B	24	Om Vellimalai	Om Vijay	Super R. Subramanyan, Veera Subash, Anju Krishna	Superb Creations	
F E B	24	Single Shankarum Smartphone Simranum	Vignesh Sha PN	Shiva, Megha Akash, Anju Kurian	Lark Studios	
F E B	24	Thugs	Brinda	Hridhu Haroon, Anaswara Rajan, Simha, R. K. Suresh	HR Pictures	
M A R	3	Ariyavan	Mithran R. Jawahar	Ishaaon, Pranali Ghogare, Daniel Balaji	MGP Mass Media	
M A R	3	Ayothi	R. Manthira Moorthy	Sasikumar, Yashpal Sharma, Preethi Asrani	Trident Arts	
M A R	3	Bagheera	Adhik Ravichandran	Prabhu Deva, Srikanth, Amyra Dastur, Gayathrie Shankar, Remya Nambeesan	Bharathan Pictures	
M A R	3	Kidugu	Veera Murugan	Kalloori Vinoth, Birla Bose, Peter Saravanan	Ramalakshmi Productions	
M A R	3	Pallu Padama Paathuka	Vijay Varadharaj	Attakathi Dinesh, Sanchita Shetty, Shah Ra	Magic Rays	
M A R	3	Vizhithelu	A. Tamil Selvan	Ashok Kumar, Gayatri Rema, Saravana Sakthi	Aadhavan Cine Creations	
M A R	8	Kannitheevu	Sundar Balu	Varalaxmi Sarathkumar, Aishwarya Dutta, Ashna Zaveri	Krithika Production	
M A R	10	Agilan	N. Kalyana Krishnan	Jayam Ravi, Priya Bhavani Shankar, Tanya Ravichandran	Screen Scene Media Entertainment	
M A R	10	Beauty	Ko. Ananda Siva	Rishi, Kareena Shah, Singamuthu	Om Jayam Theatres	
M A R	10	Irumban	Keera	Junior MGR, Yogi Babu, Aishwarya Dutta	Lemuria Movies	
M A R	10	Kondraal Paavam	Dayal Padmanabhan	Santhosh Prathap, Varalaxmi Sarathkumar, Easwari Rao	Einfach Studios	
M A R	10	Maan Vettai	M. Thirumalai	Sharan, Sunita Gogoi, Suman Shetty	T Creations	
M A R	10	Memories	Syam—Praveen	Vetri, Parvathy Arun, Dayyana Hameed	Shiju Thameen's Film Factory	
M A R	17	D3	Balaaji	Prajin, Vidya Pradeep, Charle	JKM Productions	
M A R	17	Ghosty	Kalyaan	Kajal Aggarwal, Yogi Babu, K. S. Ravikumar	Seed Pictures	
M A R	17	Kannai Nambathey	Mu. Maran	Udhayanidhi Stalin, Aathmika, Srikanth	LIPI Cine Crafts	
M A R	17	Katradhu Mara	M. Baskar	Sudhir, Fouziee, R. N. R. Manohar	Baskar Cinema Company	
M A R	17	Kudimahaan	Prakash N	Vijay Sivan, Chandini Tamilarasan, Namo Narayana	Scenario Media Works	
M A R	17	Raja Magal	Henry I	Murugadoss, Bagavathi Perumal, Prithiksha	Moon Walk Pictures	
M A R	24	Dhool Parakkudhu	Kanchi S. Durai	Ramesh, Durai, Abdul Rahman	Dhanam Pictures	
M A R	24	N4	Lokesh Kumar	Michael Thangadurai, Gabriella Sellus, Anupama Kumar	Dharmraj Films	
M A R	24	Parundhaaguthu Oor Kuruvi	Dhanabalan Govindaraj	Vivek Prasanna, Nishanth Russo, Gayathiri Iyer	Lights On Media	
M A R	24	Venkat Puthiyavan	Jayanth	Venkatesh, Shilpa, Vengal Rao	V N Movies	
M A R	26	Ellaam Mela Irukuravan Paathuppan	U. Kaviraj	Aari Arujunan, Shaashvi Bala, Rajendran	Rowther Films	
M A R	30	Pathu Thala	Krishna	Silambarasan, Gautham Karthik, Gautham Vasudev Menon	Studio Green	
M A R	31	Viduthalai: Part 1	Vetrimaaran	Soori, Vijay Sethupathi, Gautham Vasudev Menon	RS Infotainment	

=== April – June ===
Opening		Title	Director	Cast	Production	Ref.(s)
A P R	7	16 August 1947	N. S. Ponkumar	Gautham Karthik, Revathy Sharma, Jason Shah	AR Murugadoss Productions	
A P R	7	Burqa	Sarjun KM	Kalaiyarasan, Mirnaa Menon, G. M. Kumar	SKLS Galaxy Mall	
A P R	7	Ithu Kathaiyalla Nijam	Kannan Rajamanickam	Santhosh Saravanan, Sunu Lakshmi, Jagan	Kala Theatres	
A P R	7	Munthiri Kaadu	Kalanjiyam	Pugazh Mahenthiran, Subhapriya Malar, Seeman	Aathi Thirakkalam	
A P R	7	Racer	Satz Rex	Akil Santosh, Lavanya, Aaru Bala	Hustlers Entertainment	
A P R	7	Thalaikkavasamum 4 Nanbargalum	V. M. Rathnavel	Ananth Nag, Swetha Dorathy, O. A. K. Sundar	Team Productions	
A P R	7	Yevan	K. M. Durai Murugan	Dhileepan Pugazhendhi, Deepthi Manne, Gana Bala	Sunlight Cinemas	
A P R	7	Yosi	Stephen M. Joseph	Abhay Sankar, Revati Venkat, Urvashi	J&A Prime Productions	
A P R	14	Irandil Ondru Parthuvidu	Chandana Parthiban	Agaran, Vishnu Kanth, Ramya Jasmine	Chandana Pictures	
A P R	14	Ripupbury	Arun Karthik	Mahendran, Arati Podi, Kaavya Arivumani	A K Productions	
A P R	14	Rudhran	S. Kathiresan	Raghava Lawrence, R. Sarathkumar, Priya Bhavani Shankar	Five Star Creations	
A P R	14	Soppana Sundari	S. G. Charles	Aishwarya Rajesh, Lakshmi Priyaa Chandramouli, Deepa Shankar	Hamsini Entertainment	
A P R	14	Thiruvin Kural	Harish Prabhu	Arulnithi, Aathmika, Bharathiraja	Lyca Productions	
A P R	21	Deiva Machan	Martyn Nirmal Kumar	Vimal, Neha Jha, Pandiarajan	Uday Productions	
A P R	21	Jambu Maharishi	Balaji	Balaji, Ashmitha Singh, Prabhakar	TVS Films	
A P R	21	Maaveeran Pillai	KNR Raja	Vijayalakshmi Veerappan, Radha Ravi, KNR Raja	KNR Movies	
A P R	21	Yaanai Mugathaan	Rejishh Midhila	Yogi Babu, Ramesh Thilak, Karunakaran	The Great Indian Cinemas	
A P R	21	Yaathisai	Dharani Rasendran	Shakti Mithran, Seyon, Guru Somasundaram	Venus Entertainment	
A P R	22	Tamilarasan	Babu Yogeswaran	Vijay Antony, Suresh Gopi, Remya Nambeesan, Sangeetha	SNS Movies	
A P R	28	Ponniyin Selvan: II	Mani Ratnam	Vikram, Aishwarya Rai Bachchan, Jayam Ravi, Karthi, Trisha	Lyca Productions	
A P R	28	Thudikkuthu Pujam	K. Bhargaviraj	Raghunath, Bhargaviraj, Kovai Senthil	Good Luck Creations	
M A Y	5	Eppodhum Ava Nenaipu	Rama Manickam	Rama Manickam, Nellai Siva, Crane Manohar	Manickavel Cine Creations	
M A Y	5	Kulasami	Saravana Sakthi	Vimal, Tanya Hope, Bose Venkat	MIK Productions	
M A Y	5	Theerkadarishi	P. G. Mohan, L. R. Sundarapandi	Ajmal Ameer, Sathyaraj, Poornima Bhagyaraj	Sri Saravanaa Films	
M A Y	5	Uruchidhai	Devaraj	Srinivas, Nellai Siva, Theepetti Ganesan	VDS Cineemass	
M A Y	12	Farhana	Nelson Venkatesan	Aishwarya Rajesh, Selvaraghavan, Jithan Ramesh	Dream Warrior Pictures	
M A Y	12	Good Night	Vinayak Chandrasekaran	K. Manikandan, Meetha Raghunath, Ramesh Thilak	Million Dollar Studios	
M A Y	12	Raavana Kottam	Vikram Sugumaran	Shanthanu Bhagyaraj, Anandhi, Prabhu	Kannan Ravi Group	
M A Y	12	Siruvan Samuel	Sadhu Burlington	Ajidhan Thavasimuthu, Vishnu KG, Aparna	Countryside Films	
M A Y	19	Karungaapiyam	D. Karthikeyan	Kajal Aggarwal, Regina Cassandra, Janani Iyer	Pave Entertainments	
M A Y	19	Maruthi Nagar Police Station	Dayal Padmanabhan	Varalaxmi Sarathkumar, Arav, Santhosh Prathap	D Pictures	
M A Y	19	Pichaikkaran 2	Vijay Antony	Vijay Antony, Kavya Thapar, Radha Ravi	Vijay Antony Film Corporation	
M A Y	19	Yaadhum Oore Yaavarum Kelir	Venkata Krishna Roghanth	Vijay Sethupathi, Megha Akash, Magizh Thirumeni	Chandaara Arts	
M A Y	26	1982 Anbarasin Kaadhal	Ullas Shankar	Ashik Merlin, Chandana Aravind, Amal Raveendran	Shine Aliyas	
M A Y	26	Kazhuvethi Moorkkan	Sy Gowthama Raj	Arulnithi, Dushara Vijayan, Santhosh Prathap	Olympia Movies	
M A Y	26	Theera Kaadhal	Rohin Venkatesan	Jai, Aishwarya Rajesh, Sshivada	Lyca Productions	
M A Y	27	Boo	A. L. Vijay	Rakul Preet Singh, Vishwak Sen, Nivetha Pethuraj	Sarvanth Ram Creations	
M A Y	27	Kasethan Kadavulada	R. Kannan	Shiva, Priya Anand, Yogi Babu	Masala Pix	
J U N	2	Kathar Basha Endra Muthuramalingam	M. Muthaiah	Arya, Siddhi Idnani, Prabhu	Drumsticks Productions	
J U N	2	Thotta Siningiye	N. Elongovan	Thanga Pandiyan, Nivetha, Iniyaraja	Sri Lakshmi Narasimha Productions	
J U N	2	Thuritham	V. Srinivasan	Jegan, Eden Kuriakose, Bala Saravanan	Dream Focus Productions	
J U N	2	Unnaal Ennaal	A. R. Jayakrishnaa	Sonia Agarwal, Ravi Mariya, Rajesh	Shri Shri Ganesha Creations	
J U N	2	Veeran	ARK Saravan	Hiphop Tamizha Adhi, Vinay Rai, Athira Raj	Sathya Jyothi Films	
J U N	9	Bell	R. Vengat Bhuvan	Guru Somasundaram, Sridhar, Nitish Veera	Brogan Movies	
J U N	9	Maalai Nera Mallipoo	Sanjay Narayanan	Vinithra Menon, Ashwin, Dhinesh Pandiyar	Every Frame Matters Productions	
J U N	9	Por Thozhil	Vignesh Raja	R. Sarathkumar, Ashok Selvan, Nikhila Vimal, Sarath Babu	Applause Entertainment	
J U N	9	Takkar	Karthik G. Krish	Siddharth, Divyansha Kaushik, Yogi Babu	Passion Studios	
J U N	9	Valu	Rajaparthiban	Vigunda Selvan, Sivasandhya, Isai Latha	SJS Pictures	
J U N	9	Vimanam	Siva Prasad Yanala	Samuthirakani, Meera Jasmine, Anasuya Bharadwaj	Kiran Korrapati Creative Works	
J U N	16	Bommai	Radha Mohan	S. J. Surya, Priya Bhavani Shankar, Chandini Tamilarasan	Angel Studios	
J U N	16	Erumbu	Suresh G	Charle, M. S. Bhaskar, George Maryan	Mandru GVS Productions	
J U N	23	Asvins	Tarun Teja	Vasanth Ravi, Vimala Raman, Muralidaran	Sri Venkateswara Cine Chitra	
J U N	23	Azhagiya Kanne	R. Vijayakumar	Leo Sivakumar, Sanchita Shetty, Singampuli	Esthell Entertainers	
J U N	23	Naayaadi	Aadharsh Madhikaandham	Aadharsh Madhikaandham, Kadhambari, Fabby	Maya Creations	
J U N	23	Paayum Oli Nee Yenakku	Karthik Adwait	Vikram Prabhu, Vani Bhojan, Dhananjay	Karrthik Movie House	
J U N	23	Regina	Domin D'Silva	Sunainaa, Ananth Nag, Vivek Prasanna	Yellow Bear Productions	
J U N	23	Thalainagaram 2	V. Z. Durai	Sundar C, Pallak Lalwani, Thambi Ramaiah	Right Eye Theatres	
J U N	23	Thandatti	Ram Sangaiah	Pasupathy, Rohini, Vivek Prasanna	Prince Pictures	
J U N	29	Maamannan	Mari Selvaraj	Vadivelu, Udhayanidhi Stalin, Fahadh Faasil, Keerthy Suresh	Red Giant Movies	
J U N	30	Kabadi Bro	Sathish Jayaraman	Sujann, Priyaa Lal, Singampuli	Anjhana Cinemas	
J U N	30	Kandathai Padikaathey	Jothi Murugan	Adhithya, Aryan Ravi, Vaishali Thaniga	BM Bully Movies	
J U N	30	Salmon 3D	Shalil Kallur	Vijay Yesudas, Jonita Doda, Rajiv Pillai	MJS Media	

=== July – September ===
Opening		Title	Director	Cast	Studio	Ref.(s)
J U L	7	Bumper	M. Selvakumar	Vetri, Shivani Narayanan, Hareesh Peradi	Vetha Pictures	
J U L	7	Chitharikkapattavai	Ramkumar	Ramkumar, Preethi, Thyagu	Visual Creation	
J U L	7	Infinity	Sai Karthik	Natty, Vidya Pradeep, Munishkanth	Menpani Productions	
J U L	7	Kadapuraa Kalaikuzhu	Raja Gurusamy	Kaali Venkat, Munishkanth, Mime Gopi	Sakti Ciinee Productions	
J U L	7	Rayar Parambarai	Ramnath	Krishna, Sharanya R Nair, Anshula Dhawan	Chinnasamy Cine Creations	
J U L	7	Vil Vithai	S. Hari Uthraa	Arun Micheal Daniel, Arathya Gopalakrishnan, Guna	Uthraa Productions	
J U L	14	Annamalaiyin Porulu	Ezhumalai	Ezhumalai, Boys Rajan, Theepetti Ganesan	Munishwaran Films	
J U L	14	Baba Black Sheep	Rajmohan Arumugam	Abdul Ayaz, Ammu Abhirami, RJ Vigneshkanth	Romeo Pictures	
J U L	14	Maaveeran	Madonne Ashwin	Sivakarthikeyan, Aditi Shankar, Yogi Babu	Shanthi Talkies	
J U L	14	Netru Naan Indru Nee	B. Nithianandam	Aadit, Vinitha, Aravindraj	Appa Talkies	
J U L	21	Aneethi	Vasanthabalan	Arjun Das, Dushara Vijayan, Arjun Chidambaram	Urban Boyz Studios	
J U L	21	Aval Appadithan 2	Chidambaram	Syed Abdagir, Sneha Parthibaraja, Rajeshwari	Yun Flicks	
J U L	21	Echo	Nawin Ghanesh	Srikanth, Pooja Jhaveri, Vidya Pradeep	Sri Vishnu Visions	
J U L	21	Kolai	Balaji K. Kumar	Vijay Antony, Ritika Singh, Meenakshi Chaudhary	Infiniti Film Ventures	
J U L	21	Raakadhan	Dinesh Kalaiselvan	Vamsi Krishna, Gayatri Rema, Riyaz Khan	Marudham Productions	
J U L	21	Sathiya Sothanai	Suresh Sangaiah	Premji Amaren, Swayam Siddha, Reshma Pasupuleti	Super Talkies	
J U L	21	Sync	Vikas Anand Sridharan	Kishen Das, Monica Chinnakotla, Soundarya Bala Nandakumar	Mongoose Studios	
J U L	28	Appatha	Priyadarshan	Urvashi, Siddharth Babu, Aruldoss	Wide Angle Creations Production	
J U L	28	Aramudaitha Kombu	Jackson Raj	Ananda Kumar, Jesi Rathnavathy, Shanmuga Sundaram	US Fruits	
J U L	28	DD Returns	S. Prem Anand	Santhanam, Surbhi, Redin Kingsley	RK Entertainment	
J U L	28	Dinosaurs	M. R. Madhavan	Udhay Karthik, Rishi Rithvik, Saipriya Deva	Galaxy Pictures	
J U L	28	LGM	Ramesh Thamilmani	Harish Kalyan, Nadhiya, Ivana	Dhoni Entertainment	
J U L	28	Love	R. P. Bala	Bharath, Vani Bhojan, Vivek Prasanna	RP Films	
J U L	28	Pizza 3: The Mummy	Mohan Govind	Ashwin Kakumanu, Pavithrah Marimuthu, Gaurav Narayanan	Thirukumaran Entertainment	
J U L	28	Terror	Arasu	Arasu, Suhana Gowda, Karate Raja	R Pictures International	
A U G	4	Kallarai	A. B. R.	Sogoramesh, Deepthi Dewan, Pudhupettai Suresh	Good News Films	
A U G	4	Lockdown Diarie	Jolly Bastian	Vihaan Jolly, Neha Saxena, Sahana Sajad	Ankitha Productions	
A U G	4	Priyamudan Priya	A. J. Sujith	Ashok Kumar, Leesha Eclairs, Suresh	Golden Glory Movies	
A U G	4	Saandrithazh	J. V. R.	Harikumar, Roshan Basheer, Ashika	Vettrivel Cinemas	
A U G	4	Web	N. Haroon Rasheed	Natty, Shilpa Manjunath, Rajendran	Velan Productions	
A U G	10	Jailer	Nelson	Rajinikanth, Vinayakan, Ramya Krishnan, Vasanth Ravi	Sun Pictures	
A U G	11	Vaan Moondru	A. M. R. Murugesh	Delhi Ganesh, Leela Samson, Aadhitya Bhaskar	Cinemakaaran	
A U G	18	Broken Script	Giovanni Singh	Rio Raj, Moon Nila, Gunalan Morgan	Streetlight Pictures	
A U G	18	Vivasayi Ennum Naan	P. Pachamuthu	Poovarasan, Saravanan, Vela Ramamoorthy	PKS Production	
A U G	25	3.6.9	Shiva Madhav	K. Bhagyaraj, PGS, Black Pandi	PGS Production	
A U G	25	Adiyae	Vignesh Karthick	G. V. Prakash Kumar, Gouri Kishan, Venkat Prabhu	Maali & Manvi Movie Makers	
A U G	25	Black 'n' White	S. Dheekshi	Karthik Raj, Arthika, Shravnitha	K Studios	
A U G	25	Kakkan	Prabhu Manikkam	Joseph Baby, Manigandan, Bakhrudeen	Shankar Movies International	
A U G	25	Partner	Manoj Damodharan	Aadhi Pinisetty, Hansika Motwani, Yogi Babu	Royal Fortuna Creations	
A U G	25	Ramar Palam	M. Shanmugavel	Madhu, Nikita, Shanmugavel	Cinema Company	
A U G	26	Harkara	Ram Arun Castro	Kaali Venkat, Ram Arun Castro, Gowthami Chowdhry	Kalorful Beta Movement	
S E P	1	Karumegangal Kalaigindrana	Thangar Bachan	Bharathiraja, Gautham Vasudev Menon, Yogi Babu	VAU Media Entertainments	
S E P	1	Kick	Prashant Raj	Santhanam, Tanya Hope, Brahmanandam	Fortune Films	
S E P	1	Lucky Man	Balaji Venugopal	Yogi Babu, Veera Bahu, Raichal Rebecca	Think Studios	
S E P	1	Paramporul	C. Aravind Raj	R. Sarathkumar, Amitash Pradhan, Kashmira Pardeshi	Kavi Creations	
S E P	1	Rangoli	Vaali Mohandas Murugan	Hamaresh Sathish, Prarthana Sandeep, Murugadoss	Gopuram Studios	
S E P	7	Tamil Kudimagan	Esakki Karvannan	Cheran, Lal, Sri Priyanka	Lakshmi Creations	
S E P	8	Angaaragan	Mohan Dachu	Sathyaraj, Sreepathy, Reina Karad	Primerose Entertainments	
S E P	8	Noodles	Madhan Dakshinamoorthy	Harish Uthaman, Sheela Rajkumar, SJ Aazhiva	Rolling Sound Pictures	
S E P	8	Oongi Adicha Ondra Ton Weightu Da	G. Siva	G. Siva, Hima Sree	JSAM Cinemas	
S E P	8	Red Sandal Wood	Guru Ramaanujam	Vetri, Diyaa Mayurikha, Ganesh Venkatraman	JN Cinemas	
S E P	8	Striker	S. A. Prabhu	Justin Vijay, Vidya Pradeep, Kasthuri Shankar	ASW Creations	
S E P	8	Thudikkum Karangal	Velu Doss	Vimal, Misha Narang, Sathish	Odiyan Talkies	
S E P	15	Aanmeega Azhaippu	Sathyamoorthy Jeyaguru	Sathyamoorthy Jeyaguru, Subiksha, Aadesh Bala	Sathya Sudha Creations	
S E P	15	En 6 Vaathiyaar Kaalpanthatta Kuzhu	S. Hari Uthraa	Sharath, Ayraa, Ganja Karuppu	PSS Productions	
S E P	15	Mark Antony	Adhik Ravichandran	Vishal, S. J. Surya, Ritu Varma	Mini Studio	
S E P	15	Parivarthanai	S. Manibharathi	Surjith, Swathi, Rajeshwari	MSV Productions	
S E P	22	Aima	Rahul R. Krishna	Yunus Mohammed, Evlin Juliet, Shanmugam Ramaswamy	Tamil Exotic Films	
S E P	22	Are You Ok Baby?	Lakshmy Ramakrishnan	Samuthirakani, Abhirami, Mysskin	Monkey Creative Labs	
S E P	22	Demon	Ramesh Pazhanivel	Sachin Mani, Abarnathi, Ashvin Raja	Window Boys Pictures	
S E P	22	Kadathal	Salangai Durai	Damodharan, Vithisha, Nizhalgal Ravi	South Indian Productions	
S E P	22	Kezhapaya	Yazh Gunasekaran	Kathiresakumar, Krishna Kumar, Vijaya Ranadheeran	Raamson Cine Creations	
S E P	22	Maal	Dinesh Kumaran	Saikarthi, Gowri Nandha, Gajaraj	Kovai Film Mates	
S E P	22	Ulagammai	V. Jayaprakash	Gouri Kishan, Vetri Mithran, G. Marimuthu	Madras Digital Cinema Academy	
S E P	28	Chandramukhi 2	P. Vasu	Raghava Lawrence, Kangana Ranaut, Vadivelu	Lyca Productions	
S E P	28	Chithha	S. U. Arun Kumar	Siddharth, Nimisha Sajayan, Sahasra Shree	Etaki Entertainment	
S E P	28	Iraivan	I. Ahmed	Jayam Ravi, Nayanthara, Rahul Bose	Passion Studios	

=== October – December ===
Opening		Title	Director	Cast	Studio	Ref.(s)
O C T	6	800	M. S. Sripathy	Madhur Mittal, Mahima Nambiar, Narain	Movie Train Motion Picture	
O C T	6	Dhillu Irundha Poradu	S. K. Muralidharan	Karthik Doss, Anu Krishna, Yogi Babu	KP Productions	
O C T	6	En Iniye Thanimaye	Sagu Pandian	Sreepathy, Mayoori, Reesha	Black Diamond Studio	
O C T	6	Enaku Endey Kidaiyaathu	Vikram Ramesh	Vikram Ramesh, Swayam Siddha, Sivakumar Raju	Hungry Wolf Production	
O C T	6	Indha Crime Thappilla	Devakumar	Pandi Kamal, Meghana Ellen, Aadukalam Naren	Madhurya Productions	
O C T	6	Irugapatru	Yuvaraj Dhayalan	Vikram Prabhu, Shraddha Srinath, Vidharth, Sri	Potential Studios	
O C T	6	Raththam	C. S. Amudhan	Vijay Antony, Mahima Nambiar, Nandita Swetha	Infiniti Film Ventures	
O C T	6	Shot Boot Three	Arun Vaidyanathan	Sneha, Venkat Prabhu, Yogi Babu	Universe Creations	
O C T	6	The Road	Arun Vaseegaran	Trisha, Shabeer Kallarakkal, Santhosh Prathap	AAA Cinemaa	
O C T	13	Akku	Stalin Venkatachalam	Prajin, Gayatri Rema, Venkatesh	Ambigapathy Movie Makers	
O C T	13	Kundan Satti	P. K. Aghasthi	Sriram, Vidyuth Srinivas, Vishodhan	Shellammal Movie Makers	
O C T	13	Mayilanji	V. K. Natarajan	Vishnupriyan, Rishi Prakash, Shweta Natraj	Good Try Entertainment	
O C T	13	Pudhu Vedham	Rasavikram	Vignesh, Ramesh, Imman Annachi	Vittal Movies	
O C T	19	Leo	Lokesh Kanagaraj	Vijay, Sanjay Dutt, Arjun Sarja, Trisha	Seven Screen Studio	
O C T	20	Thiraiyin Marupakkam	Nitin Samson	Mohammed Ghouse, Natarajan Manigandan, Nitin Samson	360 Degrees	
O C T	21	Kuttram Nadanthathu Enna?	Sasidhar	Nassar, Sri Teja, Balu, Vignesh Karthick, Priya, Urmila Chetty	GVP Pictures	
O C T	27	Koozhangal	PS Vinothraj	Chellapandi, Karuththadaiyaan, Philip Aruldoss	Rowdy Pictures	
O C T	27	Margazhi Thingal	Manoj Bharathiraja	Bharathiraja, Suseenthiran, Shyam Shelvan	Vennila Productions	
N O V	1	A Home Away from Home	Kumar G. Venkatesh	Manisa Tait, Aneesh Surendar, Nizhalgal Ravi	Movie Sahara Asia	
N O V	3	Kapil Returns	Srini Soundarajan	Srini Soundarajan, Nimisha, Riyaz Khan	Dhanalakshmi Creations	
N O V	3	Kombu Kuthiraigal	Jeera Selvyn	Vinoth Jeeva, S. Jeeva, Sneha	Anshika Movie Makers	
N O V	3	License	Ganapathi Balamurugan	Rajalakshmi Senthil, Radha Ravi, Dhanya Ananya	JRG Productions	
N O V	3	Ra Ra Sarasukku Ra Ra	Keshav Depur	Karthik Pamidimukkala, Gayatri Rema, Kalloori Vinoth	Sky Wanders Entertainments	
N O V	3	Rule Number 4	Elwin Bosser	Pratheesh Krishna, Shree Gopika, Mohan Vaidya	YSTMY Productions	
N O V	4	Bottle Radha	Dhinakaran Sivalingam	Guru Somasundaram, Sanchana Natarajan, John Vijay, Lollu Sabha Maaran	Neelam Productions, Balloon Pictures	
N O V	10	Japan	Raju Murugan	Karthi, Anu Emmanuel, Sunil	Dream Warrior Pictures	
N O V	10	Jigarthanda DoubleX	Karthik Subbaraj	Raghava Lawrence, S. J. Suryah, Nimisha Sajayan	Stone Bench Films	
N O V	10	Raid	Karthi	Vikram Prabhu, Sri Divya, Ananthika Sanilkumar	M Studios	
N O V	11	Kida	Ra. Venkat	Kaali Venkat, Poo Ram, Deepan	Sri Sravanthi Movies	
N O V	18	Ambu Naadu Ombathu Kuppam	G. Rajaji	Sangakiri Manickam, Harshidasree, Prabhu Manickam	BK Films International	
N O V	18	Chaitra	M. Jenithkumar	Yashika Aannand, Avitej Reddy, Shakthi Mahendra	Mars Productions	
N O V	20	Kaadhal Enbadhu Podhu Udamai	Jayaprakash Radhakrishnan	Vineeth, Rohini, Lijomol Jose, Anusha Prabhu	Mankind Cinemas, Symmetry Cinemas, Nith's Productions	
N O V	24	80s Buildup	Kalyaan	Santhanam, Radhika Preethi, K. S. Ravikumar	Studio Green	
N O V	24	Azhagai Pookuthe	G. Raj	Raj, Maya, Chaplin Balu	SSV Enterprises	
N O V	24	Joe	Hariharan Ram	Rio Raj, Malavika Manoj, Bhavya Trikha	Vision Cinema House	
N O V	24	Kuiko	T. Arul Chezhian	Vidharth, Yogi Babu, Sri Priyanka	AST Films LLP	
N O V	24	Locker	Rajasekar Natarajan	Vignesh Shanmugam, Niranjani Ashokan, Nivas Adithan	Narayanan Selvam Productions	
N O V	24	Sila Nodigalil	Vinay Bharadwaj	Richard Rishi, Punnagai Poo Gheetha, Yashika Aannand	Esquire Productions	
D E C	1	Annapoorani	Nilesh Krishnaa	Nayanthara, Jai, Sathyaraj	Zee Studios	
D E C	1	Naadu	M. Saravanan	Tharshan, Mahima Nambiar, Singampuli	Sri Arch Media	
D E C	1	Parking	Ramkumar Balakrishnan	Harish Kalyan, Indhuja, M. S. Bhaskar	Passion Studios	
D E C	1	Sooragan	Sathish Geethakumar	Karthikeyan, Subiksha Krishnan, Suresh Chandra Menon	3rd Eye Cine Creations	
D E C	1	Va Varalam Va	L. G. Ravichandran	Balaji Murugadoss, Mahana Sanjeevi, Redin Kingsley	SGS Creative Media	
D E C	8	Aathmika	Damodharan Selvakumar	Ananth Nag, Aishwarya, Jeeva Ravi	Divyasri Movies	
D E C	8	Aval Peyar Rajni	Vinil Scariah Varghese	Kalidas Jayaram, Namitha Pramod, Saiju Kurup	Navarasa Films	
D E C	8	Conjuring Kannappan	Selvin Raj Xavier	Sathish, Regina Cassandra, Elli AvrRam	AGS Entertainment	
D E C	8	Kattil	E. V. Ganesh Babu	E. V. Ganesh Babu, Srushti Dange, Semmalar Annam	Pulse Entertainments	
D E C	8	Thee Ivan	Jayamurugan Muthusamy	Karthik, Sukanya, Suman Jayamurugan	Manithan Cine Arts	
D E C	15	Aghori	D. S. Rajkumar	Sidhu Sid, Shruthi Ramakrishnan, Sayaji Shinde	Motion Film Picture	
D E C	15	Fight Club	Abbas Ansari Rahmath	Vijay Kumar, Monisha Mohan Menon, Kaarthekeyan Santhanam	Reel Good Films	
D E C	15	Kannagi	Yashwanth Kishore	Keerthi Pandian, Ammu Abhirami, Vidya Pradeep	Skymoon Entertainment	
D E C	15	Paatti Sollai Thattathe	Hemasooriya	RJ Vijay, KPY Bala, Nalini	Vishnu Priya Sanjai Films	
D E C	15	Sri Sabari Ayyappan	Raja Desingu	Vijay Prasath, Sona Heiden, Ganja Karuppu	Sri Vetrivel Film Academy	
D E C	15	Theedhum Soodhum Endhan Mugavari	Ghitha Mohhan	Sreekumar Jay, Angana Arya, Avinash	Jayanthi Productions	
D E C	15	Vivesini	Bhavan Rajagopalan	Kavya, Mekha Rajan, Nassar	Laburnum Productions	
D E C	22	Aayiram Porkaasukal	Ravi Murukaya	Vidharth, Arundhati Nair, Saravanan	GRM Studio	
D E C	22	Jigiri Dosthu	Aran Vetriselvakkuma	Shariq Hassan, Ammu Abhirami, Pavithra Lakshmi	VVK Entertainment	
D E C	22	Miriam Maa	Malathy Narayan	Rekha, Ezhil Durai, Ashiq Hussain	Sri Sai Film Factory	
D E C	22	Rajini Rasigan	Dheena	Dheena, Santhana Bharathi, Crane Manohar	JMJ Creations	
D E C	22	Saba Nayagan	C. S. Karthikeyan	Ashok Selvan, Megha Akash, Karthika Muralidharan	Clear Water Films Inc	
D E C	29	Jai Vijayam	Jai Akash	Jai Akash, Akshaya Kandamuthan, Michael Augustin	Jai Akash Films	
D E C	29	Mathimaran	Mantra Veerapandian	Venkat Senguttuvan, Ivana, Aradhya	GS Cinema International	
D E C	29	Moondram Manithan	Ramdev	Sonia Agarwal, K. Bhagyaraj, Srinath	Ramdev Pictures	
D E C	29	Moothakudi	Ravi Bhargavan	Tarun Gopi, Prakash Chandra, Anvisha	The Sparkland	
D E C	29	Nandhi Varman	Perumal Varadhan	Suresh Ravi, Asha Gowda, Bose Venkat	AK Film Factory	
D E C	29	Odavum Mudiyadhu Oliyavum Mudiyadhu	Ramesh Venkat	Sathyamurthi, Yashika Aannand, Riythvika	Akshaya Pictures	
D E C	29	Peikku Kalyanam	Suci Eswar	Rajkumar, Sharmisha, Nellai Siva	Suci Creations	
D E C	29	Route No. 17	Abhilash G. Devan	Jithan Ramesh, Anju Pandiya, Hareesh Peradi	Neni Entertainments	
D E C	29	Sarakku	Jayakumar	Mansoor Ali Khan, Valeena, Yogi Babu	Raj Kennedy Films	
D E C	29	Tik Tok	Mathanakumar	Rajaji Manickam, Priyanka Mohan, Sushma Raj	MK Entertainment	
D E C	29	Vattara Vazhakku	Kannuchamy Ramachandran	Santhosh Nambirajan, Raveena Ravi, Vijay Sathya	Madura Talkies	
