= Dear Death =

- Promotional poster
- Directed by: Prem Kumar
- Written by: Sridhar Venkatesan
- Produced by: Sathish Nagarajan
- Starring: Santhosh Prathap; Jay; Smruthi
- Cinematography: Ashok Swaminathan
- Edited by: Sridhar Venkatesan
- Music by: Naveen Annamalai
- Production company: SNR Films
- Release date: 6 January 2023
- Country: India
- Language: Tamil

Dear Death is a 2023 Indian Tamil-language romantic drama film directed by Prem Kumar and starring Santhosh Prathap, Jay and Smruthi in the lead roles. It was released on 6 January 2023.

== Cast ==
- Santhosh Prathap as Death
- Jay
- Smruthi
- Venkatesan
- Sathish
- Sridhar Venkatesan
- Muthamil
- Juvi Arthi
- Sai Jeevitha
- Rakesh Karthik
- Mani Bose
- Mithun Rudran
- Sriram G.

== Production ==
The film was written by Sridhar Venkatesan, who had earlier made films such as 6 Athiyayam (2018) and Yen Peyar Anandhan (2020). He used the concept of showcasing the concept of 'death' as on-screen character, and used it as a hyperlink between four separate stories shown in the film. Production on the film was completed by September 2022.

The makers attempted to release the film on 30 December 2022, and held a press show earlier that week, but the film was eventually delayed by a week owing to a lack of screens.

== Reception ==
The film was released on 6 January 2023 across Tamil Nadu. A critic form Thinaboomi gave the film a positive review, praising the film's concept. A reviewer from Thanthi TV also presented a favourable review of the film.
