= L. G. Ravichandar =

Indian film director

- Born: Thanjavur, Tamil Nadu, India
- Occupation: Film director
- Years active: 2007-present

L. G. Ravichandhar is an Indian film director, who has directed Tamil language films.

== Career ==
L. G. Ravichandran entered the film industry as an assistant director to Boopathy Pandian, and regularly collaborated with the filmmaker in the 2000s. He made his directorial debut with Anbu Thozhi (2007), a film starring politician Thol. Thirumavalavan in the lead role. The film ran into trouble with the censors prior to release for its depiction of LTTE leader Velupillai Prabhakaran.

Ravichandran, was credited as LGR, in the horror drama Masani (2013) which starred Ramki and Ineya in leading roles. He notably cast Ramki in the film, with the actor marking a comeback to films after nine years. The director next worked on the comedy drama Aindhaam Thalaimurai Sidha Vaidhiya Sigamani (2014), which was widely promoted as actor Bharath's 25th film and noted that the film was the first to showcase the work of Siddha medicine practitioners.

He later went on direct films including Santhosh Prathap's Naan Avalai Sandhitha Pothu (2019) and Balaji Murugadoss's Va Varalam Va (2023).

== Filmography ==
Films

Year	Film	Director	Writer	Notes
2007	Anbu Thozhi	Yes	Screenplay	
2010	Aarvam	No	Dialogues	
2013	Masani	Yes	Dialogues	Jointly directed with K. Padmaraja
2014	Aindhaam Thalaimurai Sidha Vaidhiya Sigamani	Yes	Yes	
2019	Naan Avalai Sandhitha Pothu	Yes	Yes	
2023	Va Varalam Va	Yes	Yes	Jointly directed with SBR
