= Pongi Ezhu Manohara =

2015 Indian film by Ramesh Rangasamy

- Official poster
- Directed by: Ramesh Rangasamy
- Starring: Irfan; Archana; Arundhati Nair; Singampuli
- Cinematography: CJ Rajkumar
- Edited by: Athiappan Siva
- Music by: Kannan
- Release date: 6 February 2015
- Country: India
- Language: Tamil

Pongi Ezhu Manohara (transl. Boil and rise, Manohara!) is a 2015 Indian Tamil-language romantic drama film directed by Ramesh Rangasamy and starring Irfan, Archana, newcomer Arundhati Nair and Singampuli.

== Plot synopsis ==
Manohara, a young man who is a milk vendor, faces various struggles in life after a series of events nearly ruin his family. His life further changes when he discovers about a secret.

== Cast ==
- Irfan as Manohara
- Archana as Thenmozhi
- Arundhati Nair as Anandi
- Singampuli as Mani
- Sampath Ram as Manohara's father

== Music ==
The music for the film was composed by Kannan.

Track listing
No.	Title	Lyrics	Singer(s)	Length
1.	"Naan Mazhaiyil"	Annamalai	Master Teja	2:44
2.	"Naan Mazhaiyil" (Male)	Annamalai	S. A. Paranthaman	2:44
3.	"Ullae Ullae"	Ramesh Rangasamy	Velmurugan	3:57
4.	"Nada Nadanu"	Ramesh Rangasamy	Santhosh	4:29
5.	"Kaanaang Kuruvi"	Annamalai	Koushik, Thilaga	3:42
6.	"Maanu Vettai"	Ramesh Rangasamy	Prabhu Pazhaniammal	3:46
Total length:				21:22

== Release and reception ==
The film's release was initially scheduled to release on 12 December 2014 postponed to 30 January 2015 and eventually released in February.

Malini Mannath of The New Indian Express opined that "It's a lacklustre screenplay and an insipid narration. At times it gives one the feeling of watching a mediocre TV serial, that which never seemed to end. It is low-down comedy, a noisy affair lacking finesse". A critic from Dinamalar criticised Ramesh Rangasamy's direction. Vandhana of Silverscreen India wrote that "Pongi Ezhu Manohara could have been an impactful film. Instead, it is an example of how a movie, especially one based on real life, and with so much potential for drama, can become a half-baked mess".
