= Raja Magal (film) =

2023 Tamil language drama film

- Theatrical release poster
- Directed by: Henry I
- Produced by: Hasan Jakariya
- Starring: Aadukalam Murugadoss; Velina; Baby Pratiksha; Bagavathi Perumal
- Cinematography: Nikki Kannan
- Edited by: P. Ajithkumar
- Music by: Shankar Rangarajan
- Production company: Moonwalk Pictures
- Release date: 17 March 2023
- Country: India
- Language: Tamil

Raja Magal (transl. King's daughter) is a 2023 Indian Tamil-language drama film directed by Henry I and starring Aadukalam Murugadoss, Velina, Baby Pratiksha and Bagavathi Perumal. It was released on 17 March 2023.

== Cast ==
- Aadukalam Murugadoss as Sundaram
- Velina as Vasantha
- Baby Pratiksha as Kanmani
- Bagavathi Perumal
- Franklin

== Production ==
The film marked the first lead role for actor Aadukalam Murugadoss, who had earlier portrayed supporting roles. It became the second directorial venture for Henry after Akilan (2012).

== Reception ==
The film was released on 17 March 2023 across Tamil Nadu. A critic from Hindustan Times gave the film a positive review, praising the performance of the child actress. A reviewer from Dina Thanthi gave the film a mixed review, noting that several scenes in the film seemed "serial-like". Further mixed reviews were provided to the film from critics from Thinaboomi and Virakesari.
