= Naan Avalai Sandhitha Pothu =

- Theatrical release poster
- Directed by: L. G. Ravichandar
- Written by: L. G. Ravichandar
- Produced by: V. T. Rethishkumar
- Starring: Santhosh Prathap; Chandini Tamilarasan
- Cinematography: R. S. Selva
- Edited by: A. M. Rajamohammed
- Music by: Hitesh Murugavel
- Production company: Cinema Platform
- Release date: 27 December 2019
- Country: India
- Language: Tamil

Naan Avalai Sandhitha Pothu (transl. When I met her) is a 2019 Indian Tamil-language action drama film written and directed by L. G. Ravichandar. The film features Santhosh Prathap and Chandini Tamilarasan in the leading roles. The film began production in early 2016 and was released on 27 December 2019.

== Cast ==
- Santhosh Prathap as Moorthy
- Chandini Tamilarasan as Rajakumari
- Innocent as producer
- Chaams as Moorthy's friend
- G. M. Kumar as Kumari's father
- Sujatha Sivakumar as Kumari's mother
- A. Govindamoorthy as Assistant director
- Shanthi Williams
- Sriranjani
- Shanmugasundaram
- Singamuthu as astrologer
- Halwa Vasu
- Ravi Mariya
- R. Sundarrajan as himself
- T. P. Gajendran as himself
- V. T. Rethishkumar

== Production ==
The film is set in 1995–96 and is a fictionalised account of a real incident, and was shot in places like Tenkasi, Courtallam, and Papanasam.

== Soundtrack ==
Soundtrack was composed by Hitesh Murugavel.

Track listing
No.	Title	Lyrics	Singer(s)	Length
1.	"Raavaa Naanum"	L G Ravichandar	Tippu
2.	"Allikollava"	L G Ravichandar	Pawan, Saritha
3.	"Poo Meedhu"	Na. Muthukumar	Vijay Yesudas
4.	"Kannadi Kanavugale"	Arivumathi	Vijay Yesudas

== Reception ==
Thinkal Menon of The Times of India wrote, "The story has necessary elements for a 90s family drama, but the fact that we are currently two decades ahead makes it difficult for one to connect with the happenings in it. [..] The lack of detailing and inclusion of some outdated scenes are the major reasons why the film fails to impress". Dinamalar gave the film a rating of two out of five. Anupama Subramanian of Deccan Chronicle wrote that "The only bright spot in the film is the portions involving ace Malayalam actor Innocent". Maalai Malar called the film "emotional". Aaditya Anand M of News Today wrote, "Despite a slow first half, the film takes off only in the second half". He added, "Making a movie about one's own life is not easy and Ravichander, especially for that touching climax, deserves special applause for making this film".
