= Ottakoru Kaamukan =

- Film poster
- Directed by: Ajinlal; Jayan Vannery
- Written by: SK Sudeesh; Sreesh Kumar S
- Produced by: Prince Glariyans; Sajan Yesodharan; Anoop Chandran
- Starring: Shine Tom Chacko; Arundhati Nair; Lijomol Jose; Shalu Rahim; Joju George; Abhirami
- Cinematography: Sanjay Harris
- Edited by: Sanal Raj
- Music by: Vishnu Mohan Sithara
- Production company: Dazzling Movie Land
- Distributed by: Eros International
- Release date: 23 November 2018
- Country: India
- Language: Malayalam

Ottakoru Kaamukan is a 2018 Indian Malayalam-language romantic drama film directed by debutantes Ajinlal and Jayan Vannery and stars Shine Tom Chacko, debutante Arundhati Nair, Lijomol Jose, Shalu Rahim, Joju George and Abhirami.

== Cast ==
- Shine Tom Chacko as Vinu
- Arundhati Nair as Annie
- Lijomol Jose as Kathrina
- Shalu Rahim as Dominique
  - Balachandran Chullikkadu as older Dominic
- Joju George as Anantakrishnan
- Abhirami as Meera
- Vijayaraghavan as Paulose
- Kalabhavan Shajohn as SI Firoz Khan
- Bhagath Manuel as Leon Joseph
- Chembil Ashokan as matrimonial advertisement girl's father
- Shaheen Siddique as Rahul Rajashekaran
- Dain Davis as Josekutty
- Manesh Krishnan
- Manesh Kumar
- Tosh Christy
- Sreejith Kottarakkara
- Sanjay Pal
- Nimi Manuel
- Meera Nair

== Production ==
The film showcases several love stories: Shine Tom Chacko and Arundhati Nair, Joju George and Abhiramai, and Shahul Rahul and Lijomol Jose.

== Soundtrack ==
The songs are composed by Vishnu Mohan Sithara. The first song "Aathmaavil" features Shalu Rahim and Lijomol Jose falling in love on various osscasions including at church and at school. The second song "Vennila Kathiro" depicts love between Shine Tom Chacko and Arundhati Nair, who are a couple in the film.

| No. | Title | Lyrics | Singer(s) | Length |
|---|---|---|---|---|
| 1. | "Aathmaavil" | Harinarayanan BK | Jyotsna Radhakrishnan, Sachin Raj | 4:09 |
| 2. | "Vennila Kathiro" | Harinarayanan BK | Vishnu Mohan Sithara | 3:34 |
| 3. | "Maanathe Chandirane Pole" | | Joyce Surendran | 3:32 |
| 4. | "Ethoru Sooryan" | | Mridula Warrier | 3:05 |
| 5. | "Jeevithamennu Parayunnoru Naadakam" | | Crissaint | 1:42 |
| Total length: | | | | 16:08 |

== Reception ==
The Times of India gave the film a rating of two-and-a-half out of five stars and wrote that "Through Ottakkoru Kamukan, Shine Tom Chacko along with its directors Ajinlal and Jayan have offered a romantic trip that is drenched with rooted-to-reality love stories".
