= Pagal Kanavu =

Indian Tamil-language horror film

- Theatrical release poster
- Directed by: Faisal Raj
- Written by: Faisal Raj
- Produced by: Faisal Raj
- Starring: Faisal Raj; Athira Santhosh; Karate Raja
- Cinematography: Joy Antony
- Edited by: Krishnajith
- Music by: Suresh Nandan
- Production company: Jasmine Films International
- Release date: 7 November 2025
- Running time: 113 minutes
- Country: India
- Language: Tamil

Pagal Kanavu (transl. Daydream) is a 2025 Indian Tamil-language horror film written, directed, and produced by Faisal Raj under the banner Jasmine Films International. The film stars Faisal himself, Athira Santhosh, Karate Raja, Cool Suresh, Shakeela, and Vimal Raj. It was released on 7 November 2025.

== Cast ==
- Faisal Raj
- Athira Santhosh
- Karate Raja
- Cool Suresh
- Shakeela
- Vimal Raj

== Music ==
The soundtrack was composed by Suresh Nandan. The audio launch was held on 27 October 2025. A separate album for the background score was also released.

Soundtrack
No.	Title	Lyrics	Singer(s)	Length
1.	"Iravil Nadamaadum"	Raja Palanivel	Divya Midhun	3:18
2.	"Kuppamma Kuppamma"	P. Peethamparan	K. S. Unnikrishnan	3:36
3.	"Unakkum Enakkum" (duet)	Raja Palanivel	Dina R. S., Divya Midhun	3:13
4.	"Unakkum Enakkum" (male)	Raja Palanivel	Dina R. S., Divya Midhun	3:12
Total length:				13:19

Background score
No.	Title	Length
1.	"Alone"
2.	"Black Magic"
3.	"Block Method"
4.	"Climbing"
5.	"Creation"
6.	"Dark View"
7.	"Distillery Raid"
8.	"Family Love"
9.	"Feel Fresh"
10.	"For You And Me"
11.	"Friend"
12.	"From Far"
13.	"Girl With Tea"
14.	"Going On"
15.	"Gym Boy"
16.	"Happend"
17.	"Idea From Memory"
18.	"Invisible Ghost"
19.	"Journey Of Life"
20.	"Life Theft"
21.	"Love Of Mine"
22.	"Lover To Wife"
23.	"Mass"
24.	"Mental Gym"
25.	"Near Ghost"
26.	"Negative Thought"
27.	"Pakal Kanavu"
28.	"Phone Lover"
29.	"She Came"
30.	"She Is Coming"
31.	"Slow Confusion"
32.	"Star Move"
33.	"Super Natural"
34.	"The Ghost House"
35.	"The Hunt"
36.	"The Man Behind"
37.	"Think And Action"
38.	"Vloger"

== Reception ==
Maalai Malar appreciated the performances of the cast, especially Faisal, and said the music was somewhat enjoyable but criticised the screenplay and cinematography. Dina Thanthi too appreciated the cast performances, saying Athira's performance was on par with Faisal's, and the cinematography holds the film together. The critic also appreciated the background score and said the songs were okay but criticised the film's predictability.
