= Saithan =

2016 Indian film by Pradeep Krishnamoorthy

- Theatrical release poster
- Directed by: Pradeep Krishnamoorthy
- Screenplay by: Pradeep Krishnamoorthy
- Based on: Aaah! by Sujatha
- Produced by: Fathima Vijay Antony
- Starring: Vijay Antony; Arundhati Nair
- Cinematography: Pradeep Kalipurayath
- Edited by: Veera Senthil Raj
- Music by: Vijay Antony
- Production company: Vijay Antony Film Corporation
- Distributed by: Auraa Cinemas
- Release date: 1 December 2016
- Running time: 115 minutes
- Country: India
- Language: Tamil

Saithan (transl. Demon) is a 2016 Indian Tamil-language psychological horror action thriller film written and directed by Pradeep Krishnamoorthy in his directoral debut . The film stars Vijay Antony in a dual role as father and son with Arundhati Nair, Charuhasan, Y. G. Mahendra, Siddhartha Shankar and Kitty amongst others forming the secondary cast. Based on the novel Aaah! by Sujatha, it revolves around a software engineer who gets into trouble after he starts hearing strange voices asking him to kill a woman named Jayalakshmi. The film was released theatrically on 1 December 2016.

== Plot ==
Dinesh (Vijay Antony) and his boss (Y. G. Mahendra) visiting a psychiatrist. Dinesh tells the doctor that he had been listening to a voice for a few days, and it has been troubling him. the voice sounds like that of God. The doctor asks Dinesh to come along with him for a personal treatment where Dinesh tells him that he had killed his friend Ravi. The doctor asks Dinesh to relax and hypnotises him in his sleep.

It is revealed that Dinesh had been recently married to an orphan Aishwarya (Arundhati Nair), who had contacted him through a matrimonial site. After their return from their honeymoon trip, Dinesh starts hallucinating and listening to voices in his head. His best friend Ravi, who comes to help him, gets killed in a car accident due to Dinesh. Dinesh catches the bus and goes to a prostitute's place, named Jayalakshmi. Dinesh tries to kill the prostitute as voices had told him to do so. But, she runs away, and people catch him.

The psychiatrist hypnotises Dinesh and sends him back to when he was ten years old. The voice in Dinesh's head keeps telling him to die, and Dinesh sees miserable things around him. After the treatment, the doctor tells Dinesh not to wander off alone and tells his boss that Dinesh has got disturbed memories of his past life.

On returning home, a disturbed Dinesh aimlessly runs away from home and reaches Tanjavore in a train. He hears the same voice in his head directing him to that village, and he names Sharma, Gopal, Natraj and Jayalakshmi. As soon as he gets down, he hires an auto to find what happened to him and who is the voice. Upon investigating, he finds a picture of Sharma (Dinesh in his previous life) was a respected bachelor who adopted a boy Gopal and later marries Jayalakshmi (Arundhati Nair). Things go smooth until Nataraj (Arav) enters the school. Jayalakshmi and Nataraj get close and have a baby who takes the name of Sharma as his father. Though the talks go through the village, Sharma still loves and cares for the baby. One day when Nataraj passes through Sharma's house, an angry Sharma tries to rush out and confront Nataraj. In this chaos, the baby falls down and dies. Jayalakshmi runs away after this incident. Two weeks later, both Sharma and Gopal are found dead on the banks of a river and Jayalakshmi, Nataraj, are absconding. The case gets closed as they are not tracked down.

Unknown to everyone is that, Jayalakshmi returns and meets Sharma asking for forgiveness, which he readily does. Jayalakshmi feeds him food which is poisoned, and later Nataraj and Jayalakshmi kill him and Gopal for killing their baby. Then, they abandon their bodies near a river bank and run away.

A disturbed Dinesh wakes up to find himself in the mental asylum. Aishwarya comes to feed him. Dinesh, who has Sharma's soul inside him, charges upon Aishwarya, who looks like Jayalakshmi. He is sedated and left inside his room for a few days, where Sharma refuses to accept leave Dinesh's body. In the meanwhile, Aishwarya goes missing, leaving behind a letter after she gets a call from Thomas.

It is revealed that Aishwarya had married Dinesh, just to test a drug on him. But guilt drives her to become a good husband-loving woman, and she refuses to do any harm to him. The drug had caused him to remember his past. Thomas calls up Dinesh and asks him to bring back the shreds of evidence that were stolen from his guest house. When Dinesh comes with it, the gang which Aishwarya had worked for, reveals to Dinesh that she was a prostitute. Dinesh asks to take Aishwarya away with him. A scuffle ensues, and Dinesh is drugged with high doses of the chemical. This causes him to get extra ordinary power while his body is taken over by Sharma, and he takes down everyone and heads to finish Aishwarya. Now Sharma confronts Aishwarya thinking her to be Jayalakshmi, and is at the verge of killing her. Aishwarya, who is pregnant with Dinesh's child, tells him that she doesn't know what he is speaking about and that she is sorry for Dinesh's condition. She also puts forward a wish to be his wife and the mother of his child. She also saves him from getting killed by Dr. Christopher (Kamal Krishna), who runs the drug scam. In the process of saving Dinesh, she gets injured. Sharma, who is in Dinesh's body, kills Dr. Christopher.

Aishwarya, Dinesh and Dinesh's mother are in the hospital where Aishwarya is being treated. They get a call from their neighbor that a woman, Jayalakshmi, had come to visit Dinesh. Dinesh goes to his house, where he is informed that the lady had died and that she had asked him for an apology. When Dinesh sees her, he notices that she has a photo held in her hand (The 50 year old photo of herself and Sharma in it). The Jayalakshmi he appeared to have seen wasn't the real Jayalakshmi. It wasn't his wife, but another lady (Ramya Nambeesan). Jayalakshmi had died without Sharma avenging her death. Sharma leaves Dinesh's body for good as he is going to be a father soon.

== Cast ==
- Vijay Antony in a dual role as
  - Dinesh
  - Sharma
- Arundhati Nair as Aishwarya / Jayalakshmi
- Y. G. Mahendra as Dinesh's boss
- Meera Krishnan as Dinesh's mother
- Kitty as Psychiatrist
- Charuhasan as "Yettu" Arumugam
- Aadukalam Murugadoss as Ravi
- Aarav as Nataraj
- Siddhartha Shankar as Thomas
- Kamal Krishna as Dr. Christopher
- Vijay Sarathy as Auto Driver
- Vinitha as Ravi's wife
- Ramya Nambeesan as Jayalakshmi (cameo)

== Production ==
In June 2014, Vijay Antony announced that he was working on a project titled Saithan, which would begin after the completion of his impending films. Bike racer Alisha Abdullah also revealed that she would be a part of the film during an interview in October 2014, stating that it was a psychological thriller and based on the novel, The Girl with the Dragon Tattoo. She later did not feature in the film, while the director chose to adapt Writer Sujatha's novella Aah into the plot of the film. The film began production during March 2016 and was completed in November 2016. Arav, who later became popular with the show Bigg Boss, made his acting debut with this film, and had no lines of dialogue.

== Music ==
Soundtrack was composed by Vijay Antony. The album was released on November 3, 2016. The song "Yedhedho" which appeared in Sattapadi Kutram (2011) was again retained in the film.

Track listing
| No. | Title | Lyrics | Singer(s) | Length |
|---|---|---|---|---|
| 1. | "Ladukio" | Annamalai | Vijay Antony, Yazin Nizar | 4:13 |
| 2. | "Jayalakshmi" | Annamalai | Vijay Antony, Yazin Nizar | 3:56 |
| 3. | "Yededho" | Eknaath | Vijay Antony | 3:18 |
| 4. | "Opaari" | Chinnaponnu | Vijay Antony, Chinnaponnu | 2:18 |
| 5. | "Saithan Theme" | Ko. Sesha | Vijay Antony | 1:27 |
| 6. | "Saithan (Title Track)" | Instrumental | Vijay Antony | 2:35 |
| Total length: | | | | 16:67 |

== Marketing ==
Vijay Antony came up with a unique promotional strategy by releasing the first 5 minutes of the film as sneak peek.

== Controversy ==
When the makers initially launched the teaser of Saithan with the theme song penned by late lyricist Annamalai, few Hindu groups have raised objections to the using of Sanskrit slokas in the background music of the film. As a result, Vijay Antony has taken down the offended teaser and re-release the teaser with the revised lyrics penned by lyricist Ko Sesha.

== Reception ==
Saithan received positive reviews from both the audience and critics and it was a success at the box office.
