= Kapil Returns =

2023 Tamil film

- Theatrical release poster
- Directed by: Dr Srini Soundarajan
- Written by: Dr Srini Soundarajan
- Produced by: Dr Srini Soundarajan
- Starring: Dr Srini Soundarajan; Nimisha; Bharath
- Edited by: Wilsy
- Music by: R. S. Rajprathap
- Release date: 3 November 2023
- Running time: 112 minutes
- Country: India
- Language: Tamil

Kapil Returns is a 2023 Indian Tamil-language film directed and produced by Srini Sounderajan. The film stars himself in the lead role with Nimisha, Bharath and Riyaz Khan in other pivotal roles. It was released on 3 November 2023.

== Cast ==
- Dr Srini Soundarajan as Ashok
- Nimisha as Meera
- Bharath as junior Ashok
- Riyaz Khan as Prakash
- Saravanan
- Vaiyapuri
- John

== Production ==
The film was shot in Chennai, Trichy and Malaikottai.

== Reception ==
The film was released on 3 November 2023 across theatres in Tamil Nadu and Kerala. A critic from Maalai Malar gave the film a mixed review, noting it did a fair job of narrating the tale of a cricketer. Reviewers from Thinaboomi and Nakkheeran gave the film positive reviews.
