= Virumandikkum Sivanandikkum =

2016 Indian film by Vincent Selva

- Theatrical release poster
- Directed by: Vincent Selva
- Written by: Vincent Selva; J. R. Rooban (dialogues)
- Starring: Sanjay; Arundhati Nair
- Cinematography: S. K. Mitchell
- Edited by: Maruthi Krish
- Music by: R. Devarajan
- Production company: WOW4studios
- Distributed by: 4O Studios
- Release date: 25 November 2016
- Running time: 135 minutes
- Country: India
- Language: Tamil

Virumandikkum Sivanandikkum (transl. Between Virumandi and Sivanandi...) is a 2016 Indian Tamil-language comedy drama film directed by Vincent Selva and starring debutante Sanjay and Arundhati Nair with Thambi Ramaiah in an important role.

== Plot ==
Shiva, who is not interested a government job, does business with his friend. They borrow money from an evil moneylender and pay back the money with interest. Shiva and his friend end up in money issues, A director, Ganduchamy, who is a fraud, makes a movie with Shiva as the protagonist, his friend as the antagonist, and a woman, Nandhini, as the female protagonist. He promises to give Shiva six lakhs for acting in the film. Vincent Selva works as the cameraman for the film. The director shoots the film without Nandhini knowing that she is a part of the film. After shooting for the film, Shiva falls in love with Nandhini. Sivanandi, the head of a village, finds out that Shiva was part of a film with Nandhini, a girl who ran away from her village, after Vincent Selva posts the film on YouTube. Nandhini's father, Virumandi is the head of Sivanandi's rival village. How the rival villages solve their problems and whether or not Shiva will reunite with Nandhini form the rest of the story.

== Cast ==
- Sanjay as Shiva
- Arundhati Nair as Nandhini
- Thambi Ramaiah as Ganduchamy
- Aadukalam Murugadoss as Shiva's friend
- Ashvin Raja as Vincent Selva
- Joe Malloori as Virumandi
- Bala Singh as Sivanandi
- Paavendhan
- Arivazhagan
- Robo Shankar as V. Vela Ramamoorthy
- Manobala
- Delhi Ganesh
- Mayilsamy
- Yogi Babu as Moneylender's assistant
- George Maryan as Shiva's father
- Senthi Kumari as Shiva's mother
- T. P. Gajendran as Hotel owner
- Sona Heiden
- Nambirajan
- Supergood Subramani
- Pei Krishnan as Vathalam

== Soundtrack ==
Soundtrack was composed by R. Devarajan.

- "Palapalakkudhu" - Velmurugan
- "Kottudhu Kottudhu" - Prasanna, Chinmayi
- "Ullankai Adikkudhu" - Haricharan, Priyanka
- "Parayadikkudhu Machan" - Priyanka

== Reception ==
Samayam gave the film a rating of three out of five stars. The reviewer praised the title and Thambi Ramaiah's performance while criticizing certain dialogues and illogical scenes. A critic from Vikatan criticized the tile stating that it has little reference to the film and the lack of entertaining comedy scenes. Maalai Malar praised the performances of the lead cast and Thambu Ramaiah while criticizing the amount of comedy sequences that have no relevance to the film. Kungumam praised the performances of the lead cast, Thambi Ramaiah, and the comedy artists while stating the cinematography is mediocre.
