= Enaku Endey Kidaiyaathu =

Indian mystery thriller film

- Theatrical release poster
- Directed by: Vikram Ramesh
- Written by: Vikram Ramesh
- Produced by: Karthik Venkatraman
- Starring: Vikram Ramesh; Karthik Venkatraman; Swayam Siddha
- Cinematography: Thalapathy Rathinam
- Edited by: Muganvel
- Music by: Kalacharan
- Production company: Hungry Wolf Entertainments
- Distributed by: Action Reaction Jenish
- Release date: 6 October 2023
- Country: India
- Language: Tamil

Enaku Endey Kidaiyaathu (transl. I have no end) is a 2023 Indian Tamil-language mystery thriller film directed by Vikram Ramesh and produced by Karthik Venkatraman. The film stars Vikram Ramesh, Karthik Venkatraman, and Swayam Siddha in the lead roles, while Shivakumar Raju, Murali Srinivasan and Sakthivel Venkatraman play supporting roles. The film's music is composed by Kalacharan with cinematography by Thalapathy Rathinam and editing by Muganvel. The film was released on 6 October 2023.

== Cast ==
- Vikram Ramesh as Sekar
- Karthik Venkatraman as Silent David
- Swayam Siddha as Urvashi
- Shivakumar Raju as Mastan Bhai
- Murali Srinivasan as Devaraj
- Sakthivel Venkatraman as Police Officer

== Production ==
The film was shot in Chennai for 35 days and film noted debuted for the director Vikram Ramesh

== Reception ==
A critic of Maalai Malar wrote that "Vikram Ramesh who plays the hero has done his role well by giving the required performance."Dinamalar critic rated 2.75 out of 5 and gave mixed reviews.Nakkheeran critic noted that "nice try!".Thinaboomi critic wrote that "The film's producer Karthik Venkatraman, who is playing the role of David, has acted superbly."
