= Pradeep Kalipurayath =

Indian filmmaker (1981–present)

- Born: Pradeep Kalipurayath; 12 October 1981 (age 44); Chennai, Tamil Nadu, India
- Occupations: Cinematographer; Producer; Director
- Years active: 2005–present

Pradeep Kalipurayath is an Indian advertising director, cinematographer, filmmaker known for his work predominantly in south Indian advertisements and corporate films. His first taste of fame came with having produced and directed a music video featuring India’s first Malayalam rock band ‘Avial’ in 2005 who moved on to be quite the sensation across the world. It was one of the first YouTube videos that had become popular in India. Ad films, documentaries and television shows have been made under the banner of Poorman Productions since 2006.

His initial pieces of work as a cinematographer included Independent Indian English films like ‘I Just Don't Get It’, That Four-Letter Word and ‘Good Night, Good Morning. His first Tamil feature film as a cinematographer is Saithan (2016).

== Advertising career ==
Poorman Productions’ corporate identity was conceptualized by Tribe 10 Advertising, which won them a Bronze Award at the Advertisement Club Awards of 2007 in Chennai.

== Non film works ==
His recent work includes a story through photographs made for a coffee-table book ‘Metamorphosis’ made in collaboration with contemporary dancer Aparna Nagesh and her all girls dance ensemble, High Kicks. The book brings out the life and journey of a contemporary female dancer in India with photographs presented in great print quality clicked over the span of five years. The photographs are clicked by Pradeep Kalipurayath and this is the first book to showcase him as a photographer.

== Filmography ==
=== Director ===
Strange (Short Film)

Safe - 2019

=== Cinematography ===
2007 - I Just Don't Get It

2008 - That Four-Letter Word

2015 - Touch

2016 - Saithan

=== As producer ===
2006 - Nada Nada - Malayalam rock single featuring Avial: John. P.Varky, Tony, Rex Vijayan Anand and Joffey

2010 – Prana, The Band

2012- Rahlaap- Rahul Nambiar and Aalap Raju.

=== As freelancer ===
2008 - Good Hair (Behind-the-scenes photography)

2009 - Manchadikuru (Behind-the-scenes filmmaking)

2009 - Good Night, Good Morning (Additional Cinematography)

2014 - Shastram Trailer (Cinematography & Line Producer)
