= Naayaadi =

2023 Tamil film

- Release poster
- Directed by: Aadharsh Madhikaandham
- Written by: Aadharsh Madhikaandham
- Produced by: Mohandas Pullanikaatil; Mani Suresh; Finny Mathew; Vipin Thomas; Aadharsh Madhikaandham
- Starring: Aadharsh Madhikaandham; Kadhambari Sowmya
- Cinematography: Mosses Daniel
- Edited by: CM Elangovan
- Music by: Arun
- Production companies: Advik Visual Media; Warrier Films Corporation Australia; Futurz Australia; Aadharsh Madhikaandham Pictures
- Distributed by: Action Reaction Jenish
- Release date: 23 June 2023
- Running time: 102 minutes
- Country: India
- Language: Tamil

Naayaadi is a 2023 Indian Tamil-language horror film written and directed by Aadharsh Madhikaandham. The film stars Aadharsh Madhikaandham, Kadhambari Sowmya, Malavika Manoj and Fabby in lead roles.The film was produced under the banners of Advik Visual Media, Warrier Films Corporation Australia, Futurz Australia and Aadharsh Madhikaandham Pictures.

== Cast ==
- Aadharsh Madhikaandham as Aadharsh
- Kadhambari Sowmya as Mithra
- Malavika Manoj as Swathi
- Fabby as Fabby
- Aravinth samy J as Aravind
- Nivas S. Saravanan as Niwas
- Ravichandran K as Ravichandran
- G Geetha lakshmi

== Production ==
The film's cinematography was done by Mosses Daniel, while CM Elangovan handled the editing of the film.

== Reception ==
Pachi Avudayappan of ABP Nadu gave two stars out of five and stated that "On the other hand, kudos to director Adarsh Madhikantham for taking up the story of Nayadi people which has never been told on screen". A critic from Maalai Malar wrote that "Director Aadesh has decided to take the story of Nayadi, a mountain people who lived in an earlier era. But he has made war by showing other things beyond the things required for the story".

A critic from Dina Thanthi wrote that "The scene where some friends are killed by a supernatural figure is chilling." A critic from Virakesari rated two out of five and gave mixed reviews.

Thinaboomi critic stated that "Newcomer Adarsh who is playing the hero has given his excellent performance. Overall, the film would have been a success if the screenplay had added more interest"
