= Paadam =

2018 Indian Tamil-language film

- Directed by: Rajasekhar
- Written by: Rajasekhar
- Produced by: Gipin P.S
- Starring: Karthik; Vijith; Yashika Aannand
- Edited by: S.S Mano
- Music by: Ganesh Raghavendra
- Production company: Rollon Movies
- Release date: 27 April 2018
- Running time: 126 minutes
- Country: India
- Language: Tamil

Paadam (transl. Lesson) is a 2018 Indian Tamil-language drama film written and directed by Rajasekhar and produced by Gipin P.S. The film stars newcomers Karthik and Mona as school students, Vijith, Nagendran in the lead roles while Yashika Aannand and Jangiri Madhumita provide pivotal roles in the film. The music is scored by Ganesh Raghavendra. The film was released on 27 May 2018.

== Plot ==
A school boy named Jeeva, who is the son of police officer Kottai Perumal, questions the inabilities and defects in the Indian educational system and also shows his frustration towards studying lessons in English instead of Tamil. On the other hand, Jeeva's father also hesitates and feels afraid to speak in English. If Jeeva hears even a single English word, he becomes frustrated. One day, Kottai Perumal was sent on a transfer to Chennai after his unruly behaviour with a higher police officer who did not know to speak in Tamil. At the same time, Jeeva is excited as he thinks that he can avoid learning English by leaving the village to Chennai. But Jeeva is compelled by his father to study in English as his father desired him to be fluent in the language. Jeeva attended the high school Valluvar Vidyashram in Ramapuram and started to learn English, but his English teacher, is punitive toward students who have difficulty with English. But Jeeva gets support and advice from his Hindi language teacher and escapes from the school. When his father learns of this, he politely requested his son to study in English medium. Finally after his father's request, he changes and learns English.

== Cast ==
- Karthik as Jeeva
- Mona as Jeeva's friend
- V. R. Nagendran as Kottai Perumal, Jeeva's father
- Jangiri Madhumita as Jeeva's mother
- Vijith as an English teacher (Chennai high school)
- Yashika Aannand as Hindi teacher
- Venkatesh as an English teacher (Kottaimedu government middle school)
- R. N. R. Manohar as principal
- Bala Singh as Minister of Education
- Harish as Jeeva's Friend

== Reception ==
A critic from Ananda Vikatan criticised the film and wrote that "Director Rajasekhar, who has rarely seen children's films in Tamil, has taken the film like a little child. In all the scenes of the film, 'Do you know what kind of scene this is... enjoy it!' The screenplay feels like it is stabbing me with a stick".
