= Kezhapaya =

2023 Tamil film

Kazhapaya
- Directed by: Yazh Gunasekaran
- Produced by: R. Kathiresan
- Starring: Kathiresakumar; Krishnakumar; Vijaya Ranadheeran
- Cinematography: Ajithkumar
- Edited by: K. N. Rajesh
- Music by: Kebi
- Production company: Season Cinemas
- Distributed by: I Films
- Release date: 22 September 2023
- Country: India
- Language: Tamil

Kezhapaya (transl. Old Fellow) is a 2023 Indian Tamil-language film directed by Yazh Gunasekaran and starring Kathiresakumar and Krishnakumar in the lead roles. It was released on 22 September 2023.

== Cast ==
- Kathiresakumar as Sundaresan
- Krishnakumar
- Vijaya Ranadheeran
- K. N. Rajesh
- Bakery Murugan
- Anudiya
- Uriyadi Anandaraj
- Naga
- Yazh Gunasekharan

== Production ==
The film marked Yazh Gunasekaran's second venture after the unreleased Theriyum Aana Theriyadhu. The film was predominantly shot in 2022.

== Reception ==
The film was released on 22 September 2023 across theatres in Tamil Nadu. A critic from Dina Thanthi noted that "despite a strong script, the lack of comedy may disappoint viewers". A reviewer from Thinaboomi gave the film a positive review.
