= 1982 Anbarasin Kaadhal =

2023 Indian romantic drama film

- Release poster
- Directed by: Ullas Shankar
- Written by: Ullas Shankar
- Produced by: Biju Karimbinkalayil, Shine Aliyas
- Starring: Ashik Merlin; Chandana Aravind
- Cinematography: Jisbin Sebastian
- Edited by: Greyson ACA
- Music by: S. Chinthamani
- Production company: Angel Isha Production
- Release date: 26 May 2023
- Country: India
- Language: Tamil

1982 Anbarasin Kaadhal (transl. 1982 Anbarasu's love) is a 2023 Indian Tamil-language romantic drama film written and directed by Ullas Shankar in his directorial debut. The film stars Ashik Merlin and Chandana Aravind with Amal Raveendran, Arunima Raj, Harish Sivaprakasam, Selva and Ullas Shankar in supporting roles.

The film was released on 26 May 2023.

== Cast ==
- Ashik Merlin as Anbarasu "Anbu"
- Chandana Aravind as Priya
- Amal Raveendran as Sarath
- Arunima Raj as Kavya
- Ullas Shankar as Arumugam
- Harish Sivaprakasam as Bala
- Selva as Karthi
- Tamilan as Murugan
- Sumathi Das as Amudha
- S. Chintamani as Vasantha
- Dena Ann Manuel as Anitha
- Devi Nandhana as Kavitha
- Biju Shankar as Military Man

== Production ==
The film was produced by Biju Karimbinkalayil and Shine Aliyas under the banner of Devakannya Productions and Angel Isha Productions.The cinematography of the film was done by Jisbin Sebastian, and the editing of the film was done by Greyson ACA. The principal photography of the film commenced on 16 July 2022, with a Pooja in Madurai and primary scenes shot in Munthal Checkpost, Bodinayakkanur.

== Music ==
The music of the film was composed by S. Chinthamani.

Track listing
No.	Title	Lyrics	Singer(s)	Length
1.	"Vellinilave"	S. Chinthamani	Haricharan	4:29
2.	"Nenjukkulle"	S. Chinthamani	K. S. Chithra; Bijoy P Jacob	3:09
3.	"Paaka Mudindha Kaadhal"	R. Vaigaimani	Ranjith Govind	3:15
4.	"Vidiyalin Osai"	S. Chinthamani	Ranjith Govind	3:31
5.	"1982 Anbarasin Kaadhal Theme"	—	—	1:00
Total length:				15:24

== Reception ==
Dina Thanthi gave the film a mixed review. Su Senthilkumaran of Namma Tamil Cinema gave the film a mixed review. Critic of Tamil FM gave mixed review.

Thinaboomi critic wrote that "Director Ullash Shankar, who plays the lead role, is full of all aspects of the villain. Also, kudos to director Ullash Shankar for shooting in a few locations with a simple plot."
