= Aima =

- Release poster
- Directed by: Rahul R Krishna
- Written by: Renjith tr
- Screenplay by: Renjith tr
- Story by: Renjith tr
- Produced by: Shanmugam Ramasamy
- Starring: Yunus Mohammed; Shanmugam Ramasamy; Elvin Mathew
- Cinematography: Vishnu Kannan
- Edited by: Arun Raghav
- Music by: K R Rahul
- Production company: Tamil Exotic Films
- Release date: 22 September 2023
- Country: India
- Language: Tamil

Aima is a 2023 Indian Tamil-language thriller film written and directed by Rahul R Krishna. The film stars Yunus Mohammed, Shanmugam Ramasamy, Akhil Prabakaran, Elvin Mathew and Sisira Sebastian in the lead roles. The film was produced by Shanmugam Ramasamy under the banners of Tamil Exotic Films.

== Cast ==
- Yunus Mohammed as Adam Saint Joshep
- Shanmugam Ramasamy as Lucius Domitius Ahenobarbus
- Elvin Mathew as Mariyam Alexandar
- Akhil Prabakaran
- Sisira Sebastian

== Production ==
The Principal photography of the film was held in Kuttikkanam, Kumuli, and Palakkad in Kerala. The trailer of the film was released on 19 September 2023.

== Reception ==
Maalai Malar critic rated two point five out of five and stated that "Director Rahul R. Krishna has tried to tell the story in Hollywood science fiction style."Thinaboomi critic wrote that "All in all, the film is shaping up to attract fans from all walks of life.". Anupama Subramanian rated two point five out of five and noted that "Decent Thriller"
