= 3.6.9 =

- Release poster
- Directed by: Shiva Madhav
- Written by: Shiva Madhav
- Produced by: PGS
- Starring: K. Bhagyaraj; PGS
- Cinematography: Marishwaran Mohan Kumar
- Edited by: R.K. Srinath
- Music by: Karthik Harsha
- Production company: PGS Productions
- Release date: 25 August 2023
- Country: India
- Language: Tamil

3.6.9 is a 2023 Indian Tamil-language science fiction film written and directed by Shiva Madhav. The film stars K. Bhagyaraj and PGS, who produced the film under the banner of PGS Productions.

== Cast ==
- K. Bhagyaraj as Father Benet Castro
- PGS as Cyrus
- Black Pandi as Edward
- Angayar Kannan as William

== Production ==
The film was made with a single 81-minute-long uncut multi shot. The shoot of the film took place at Pillaiyarkuppam, Bahour on 15 December 2021, beginning at 11:40am, and concluded by 1:01pm. Over 150 actors and 450 technicians were on the location during the making of the film. The World Record Union, a company headquartered in the United States, subsequently gave the film a 'World Record Award'.

== Reception ==
Dina Thanthi critic wrote that "Although some scenes are repetitive, Siva Madhav, who has directed the film, is commendable for framing the future scientific development as a screenplay in just 81 minutes with 24 cameras". Thinaboomi critic stated that "Bhagyaraj, who plays the role of a priest, is amazing with his experienced performance". The Hindu critic gave 2 stars out of 5 and gave a mixed review.
