= Varnam (2011 film) =

- Poster
- Directed by: Raju
- Written by: Krishna Davinci; Balaji Dharanidharan; Maruthupandian; Stalin; Raju
- Produced by: Rajendran; Santosh Sivan; Jegan Subramaniam (co-producer)
- Starring: Giridharan; Aathish; Monica; Aswatha; Sampath Raj; Vijay Sethupathi; Muthukumar; Karate Raja
- Cinematography: C. Prem Kumar
- Edited by: Madhan Gunadeva
- Music by: Isaac Thomas Kottukapally
- Production company: Mediazen
- Distributed by: Mediazen
- Release date: 7 October 2011
- Running time: 106 minutes
- Country: India
- Language: Tamil

Varnam (transl. Colour) is a 2011 Indian Tamil-language drama film directed by Raju. The film stars Giridharan, Aathish, Monica, Sampath Raj, Aswatha and Vijay Sethupathi, Muthukumar and Karate Raja. Raju, who produced the Malayalam film Anandabhadram, made his directorial debut with this film.

== Cast ==
- Giridharan as Mani
- Aathish as Anwar (Velu)
- Monica as Kavitha
- Aswatha as Thangam
- Sampath Raj as Durai
- Vijay Sethupathi as Nanda
- Muthukumar as Rathnam
- Karate Raja as Muniyandi

== Production ==
Monica played the deglam role of a teacher in the film. Vijay Sethupathi played a character role of a lower class man.

== Festivals ==
Varnam has been the official selection in the following film festivals:

- Montreal World Film Festival in 2011
- London Asian Film Festival 2011
- Chennai International Film Festival 2011
- Norway Tamil Film Festival Awards 2012
- New York Indian Film Festival 2012
- Roxbury Film Festival 2012

== Reception ==
Malathi Rangarajan from The Hindu wrote that "Merits apart, Varnam boasts of a strong storyline. It is the screenplay that lacks punch". Dinamalar praised the cinematography and the music. A critic from The New Indian Express described the film as "meticulously crafted, deftly narrated and intriguing," stating that 'Varnam' is a definite watch. Anupama Subramanian from Deccan Chronicle gave the film a rating of three out of five stars and wrote that "Varnam is worth a watch". A critic from Sify rated the film two out of five stars noting that "the film may prove a tad slow to those who are used to fast paced action films or too realistic for those in love with glossy romantic love stories".
