= Aayiram Porkaasukal =

2023 Indian film by Ravi Murukaya

- Theatrical release poster
- Directed by: Ravi Murukaya
- Starring: Vidharth; Saravanan; Arundhati Nair
- Cinematography: Banu Murugan
- Music by: Johan
- Production company: GRM Studio
- Release date: 15 December 2023
- Running time: 125 minutes
- Country: India
- Language: Tamil

Aayiram Porkaasukal (transl. Thousand gold coins) is a 2023 Indian Tamil-language romantic comedy film, written and directed by Ravi Murukaya. Produced by GRM Studio, with the film stars Vidharth, Saravanan and Arundhati Nair in the lead roles. The film was released theatrically on 15 December 2023.

== Plot ==
Animuthu is a lazy, jobless 52-year-old man living in Kuruvadipatti near Thanjavur. He only cooks, sleeps, and eats. He has a beggar called Arivazhagan living outside his house that he also feeds. His sister, Senthamarai, and his nephew, Thamil, visit his home. Senthamarai makes Thamil stay at Animuthu's house. After Thamil secretly drinks his alcohol without Animuthu's permission, Animuthu calls his sister. So Thamil threatens Animuthu if his mother is ever to return.

A girl, Poongothai, who has a shop in the town, falls in love with Thamil after Thamil goes to the shop to buy cigarettes. After Poongothai's friend, Aarayi lies that Thamil and Poongothai were together hugging and kissing each other, Poongothai's mother visits Animuthu and Animuthu's neighbour, Govindan, and shouts at them, and tells them not to visit their shop ever. After the government announces a plan to clean up the waste in the village, each person in the town will build a toilet and submit a photo of the restroom at the panchayat office to get the relief of Rs. 12000. Govindan builds a toilet next to his home. Animuthu does not construct a toilet, decides to cheat by taking a photo next to Govindan's toilet and gets the relief fund of Rs. 12000. Animuthu spends the entire money on rice, fish, egg, soup and meat. Govindan informs the panchayat president that Animuthu smartly cheated him. Govindan threatens to go to the police, so Animuthu and Thamil decide to build a toilet in their backyard in five days, and Govindan agrees to give them the tools to construct the toilet.

Thamil and Animuthu build the toilet, while Govindan complains to the president whenever they sleep. Thamil injures his foot while cutting the ditch, so Poongothai provides medical attention to him. Animuthu recruits two people, Andavan and Harichandran, to dig the well in his backyard. Andavan and Harichandran dig the well. While Andavan goes to smoke a cigarette, Harichandran finds a lot of old gold coins from the Chola dynasty. Thamil and Animuthu see him put the coins in his lungi and fight with him. They agree to split the money and tell him to come early tomorrow.

Thamil and Poongothai plan to elope with the old coins at night, but a figure, smoking with a cape and a stick, blocks their paths wherever they run. Poongothai goes home, quickly puts her stuff away, and sleeps. Thamil finds out that Animuthu was the one who stood blocking their path.

One day, Thamil visits Poongothai, but her mother tells her to go home, so Poongothai locks Thamil inside the shop. When Harichandran goes to Animuthu to split the coins, Animuthu tells him to wait for Thamil. Animuthu repeatedly calls Thamil, but he says he will come. Eventually, Animuthu and Harichandran get into a fight. Poongothai lets Thamil out, and Thamil goes to his house to find Harichandran lying lifeless on the floor, surrounded by blood. Thamil takes his body and leaves it on the railway tracks. Thamil goes home to find Animuthu, and Animuthu tells Thamil that Harichandran stabbed him, that is why the blood was there, and that Harichandran was just unconscious.

Eventually, Harichandran is alive. Govindan overhears Animuthu supposedly murdering someone and believes that a murder has happened. Thamil and Animuthu visit Harichandran and realise that he has forgotten everything. After a few comedic incidents, the village discovers the old coins, and Harichandran regains his memory. They agree to split the coins with the town. Just then, the Archaeology department enters the police station, claiming that the gold coins belong to the government, and they take them. Just as they leave, Arivazhagan steals the coin pot, and there is a hilarious chase between the department and the villagers. Eventually, the Archaeology department takes the pot at gunpoint and leaves. A few minutes after they leave, the original Archaeology department arrives and discovers that the officers who came before were fake. Thamil says the deceptive officers could not have got as far as the neighbouring village, so the villagers go after them. Thamil and Animuthu go home on their motorcycle, and after their motorbike goes over a pothole, the gold coins drop out of the back case. In a flashback, Thamil switched the gold coin pot with a pot full of stones. Animuthu gets happy. In the end, Thamil, Animuthu and Poongothai leave for Chennai

== Cast ==
- Vidharth as Thamil
- Saravanan as Animuthu, Thamil's maternal uncle
- Arundhati Nair as Poongothai, Thamil's love-interest
- Hello Kandasamy as Govindan, Animuthu's neighbour
- George Maryan as Harichandran
- Vetrivel Raja as Ponram
- Semmalar Annam as Aarayi
- Pawan Raj as Andavan
- Jindha Gopi
- Karna Raja
- Bharathi Kannan as Police inspector Muthu

== Production ==
Production work on the film began in mid-2017, with Vidharth and Arundhati Nair signed on to play lead roles. The shoot of the film progressed throughout 2018 and was completed by March 2019, with Arundhati briefly taking on the stage name of Jahnavika before reverting to her original name.

== Release and reception ==
The film had a theatrical release on 15 December 2023 across Tamil Nadu. A critic from Times of India noted that "a series of well-acted characters elevates this comedy of errors" and that "as for the cast, all actors are unanimously good, particularly those who play the smaller roles". A reviewer from The South First wrote "Ravi Murukaya's directorial is not a rip-roaring comedy but then, it has sequences which do bring a smile to your face".
