= Aarvam =

- Directed by: Aadithyan
- Written by: Aadithyan; L. G. Ravichandhar (dialogues)
- Produced by: D. Anil
- Starring: Satya; R. Sanjay; Meenu Karthika
- Cinematography: Mohan Puthussery
- Edited by: Murugaram
- Music by: Ronnie Raphael
- Production company: Movie Dreams
- Release date: 22 October 2010
- Running time: 140 minutes
- Country: India
- Language: Tamil

Aarvam (transl. Interest) is a 2010 Indian Tamil language action film directed by Aadithyan. The film stars Satya Saleel Hussain, R. Sanjay and Meenu Karthika, with Ganja Karuppu, Ponnambalam, Karate Raja, Scissor Manohar, Bonda Mani and Vadivukkarasi playing supporting roles. The film, produced by D. Anil, had a musical score by Ronnie Raphael and was released on 22 October 2010.

== Plot ==
Anjali, the sister of the dreaded gangster Aadhi, leaves the city and returns to her hometown after finishing her studies. The young man Mahesh, the son of a revenue inspector, falls in love at first sight with Anjali during the village's festival. Mahesh then proposes to Anjali, but she refuses to love someone she does not know yet. Mahesh then starts hanging out with Anjali, and she eventually falls in love with him. The villagers, including Mahesh, are afraid of Aadhi, so Mahesh devises a master plan: he lies to Sathya that Anjali is in love with him. Sathya, the innocent village milkman, is from a poor background. He lives with his widowed mother, little sister, and uncle. Thereafter, Sathya falls in love with Anjali and changes his looks to please her.

When Aadhi learns about his sister's love affair, he sends his henchmen to beat up Sathya, but Sathya surprisingly overcomes them. Later, Aadhi kills the brother of his archenemy Pandi and convinces him that the killer was no other than Sathya. A vengeful Pandi and his henchmen go to Sathya's house and beat up his family, but Sathya defeats the villains. Aadhi then makes everything to portray Sathya as rowdy so his sister will avoid him. Afterwards, Anjali tells Sathya that she does not love him, but she is in love with Mahesh. The heartbroken Sathya genuinely accepts his fate, and he is disgusted by Mahesh's cheap mindset.

In reality, Mahesh wants to marry Anjali to get rich. Aadhi finally accepts the marriage between Mahesh and his sister. However, Anjali finds out that Mahesh is a bad person; thus, the wedding is cancelled. In the meantime, Pandi and his henchmen beat the harmless Sathya to death. The film ends with Anjali mourning Sathya's death.

The film depicts that true love is such a powerful force. It is there for everyone to embrace-that kind of unconditional love for all of humankind. That is the kind of love that impels people to go into the community and try to change conditions for others, to take risks for what they believe in.

== Cast ==
- Satya Saleel Hussain as Sathya
- R. Sanjay as Mahesh
- Meenu Karthika as Anjali
- Ganja Karuppu as Tea master
- Ponnambalam as Pandi
- Karate Raja as Aadhi
- Scissor Manohar as Sathya's uncle
- Bonda Mani as Mani
- Vadivukkarasi as Sathya's mother
- Malaysia Jennifer
- Preethi Pushpan
- Divya
- Remya

== Production ==
Apart from the film director Adithyan, the hero Satya, the film's producer Anil Dev (Anil D.), music director Ronnie Raphael, art director Anil Sreeragam and make-up man Binoy are the other Malayalis behind Aarvam.

== Soundtrack ==
Aarvam

Soundtrack album by Ronnie Raphael
- Released: 2010
- Recorded: 2010
- Genre: Feature film soundtrack
- Length: 29:38
- Label: Inreco
- Producer: Ronnie Raphael

Ronnie Raphael chronology
College Days (2010)	Aarvam (2010)	Simhasanam (2012)

The film score and the soundtrack were composed by Ronnie Raphael. The soundtrack features 6 tracks.

Tracklist
No.	Title	Lyrics	Singer(s)	Length
1.	"Sela Kettiya"	Udumalai Karisal Muthu	Anil Ram, Rajalakshmi	4:25
2.	"Pal Manase"	L. G. Ravichandhar	Kirupa, Anwar	5:22
3.	"Vinnodu Serade"	L. G. Ravichandhar	Sannidananthan	4:21
4.	"Devadaye Kandane"	L. G. Ravichandhar	Vidhu Prathap	4:56
5.	"Muthu Muthu"	L. G. Ravichandhar	Jassie Gift, Anitha Shaiq	4:13
6.	"Muthal Muthalai"	Udumalai Karisal Muthu	K. K. Nishad, Rajalakshmi	6:21
Total length:				29:38

== Release ==
The film was released on 22 October 2010 alongside four other films. The film ran for 50 days.
