= My Son Is Gay =

- Directed by: Lokesh Kumar
- Produced by: Anil Saxena; Lokesh Kumar
- Starring: Anupama Kumar; Ashwinjith; Abishek Joseph George; Kishore; Jayaprakash
- Cinematography: Rathina Kumar
- Edited by: Dani Charles
- Music by: Santhan Anebajagane
- Production company: Beyond The Limit Creations
- Release date: August 19, 2017 (Indian Film Festival of Melbourne)
- Running time: 115 Minutes
- Country: India
- Language: Tamil

My Son Is Gay, also known as En Magan Magizhvan in India (Tamil: என் மகன் மகிழ்வன், romanized: Eṉ Makaṉ Makiḻvaṉ), is a 2017 Indian Tamil-language film. It is a tale of a gay man coming out and the impact it has on his relationship with his mother and other people around them. Lokesh Kumar, a filmmaker from Chennai, India, wrote and directed the film. The film is about acceptance, tolerance, and the right of marginalized people to live with dignity in mainstream of society. The film has won 4 awards.

== Plot ==
Lakshmi is a mother and a no-nonsense school principal. Her life is uncomplicated and safe and she is blissfully unaware of the storm brewing that will threaten everything she believes in. She loves her son Varun, a cheerful and a carefree young man who is devoted to her. Varun always knew he was different from other boys, but felt secure in his mother's love. That security is shattered when Lakshmi discovers Varun is gay and rejects him. Varun finds love with Karthik, but he will never be as happy as he once was. Lakshmi can't bear the loss of her son and sets out to find him.

== Cast ==
- Anupama Kumar as Lakshmi
- Ashwinjith as Varun
- Abishek Joseph George as Karthik
- Jayaprakash as Dr Ram
- Kishore as Gopi
- Sriranjani as Uma
- Eswari as Chandrama
- Sharath as Rohit
- Maya S. Krishnan as Maya
- Sharukh Ahmed as Sharukh
- Sowmith Yadav as Aakash

== Production ==
The project began as a Hindi-language feature film in 2013. The makers made an unsuccessful attempt at crowd-funding and put the film on hold for almost two years. By 2016 the director Lokesh Kumar and Anil Saxena (producer) decided to produce it in Tamil. The movie was shot at Malabar Cove (near the famous Drive-in Beach of Muzhappilangad) in Kannur, Kerala, South India. The film was completed by early 2017 and saw its world premiere at the Indian Film Festival of Melbourne. It was selected to be shown at the New York LGBT Film Festival in October 2017. The film was also selected in Dialogues Kolkata LGBT fest and had its Indian Premiere there. The film had its Chennai Premiere in 15th Chennai International Film Festival by December 2017. The film had great response in Kolkata and Chennai.

In 2018, the rights of the film was acquired by a Mumbai based company called Select Media & the film was dubbed in Hindi language, which was further sold to Star India for their television streaming. The Hindi dubbed version was released on 4 October 2020 and the original Tamil version was released on 4 November 2020 in Youtube.
