= Chaitra (2023 film) =

- Release poster
- Directed by: M. Jenith Kumar
- Written by: M. Jenith Kumar
- Produced by: K. Manoharan
- Starring: Yashika Aannand; Avitej Reddy; Shakthi Mahendra
- Cinematography: P. Sathish Kumar
- Edited by: Elisha
- Music by: Prabakaran Meiyappan
- Production company: Mars Productions
- Distributed by: PVR Pictures
- Release date: 17 November 2023
- Running time: 117 minutes
- Country: India
- Language: Tamil

Chaitra is a 2023 Indian Tamil-language horror thriller film written and directed by M. Jenith Kumar. The film stars Yashika Aannand, Avitej Reddy and Shakthi Mahendra in the lead roles. The film, produced by K. Manoharan under the banner of Mars Productions, was released on 17 November 2023.

== Cast ==
- Yashika Aannand as Chaitra
- Avitej Reddy as Kathir
- Shakthi Mahendra as Divya
- G.Pooja
- Kannan Varatharaj as a police officer

== Production ==
The film was produced by K. Manoharan under the banner of Mars Productions. The cinematography was done by P. Sathish Kumar, while editing was handled by Elisha. The teaser of the film was released in April 2023

== Soundtrack ==
The soundtrack of the film was composed by Prabakaran Meiyappan.

Track listing
No.	Title	Lyrics	Singer(s)	Length
1.	"Believe You Nanbaa"	Manikandan Vijayalakshmi	Mukesh, Yeskay, Pavithrra Venkatraman	3:45
2.	"Rathamaai Vervaigal"	Manikandan Vijayalakshmi	Akshaya Shridhar	1:24
Total length:				5:09

== Reception ==
A critic from Dinakaran wrote that "the serious hospital scenes are laugh-out-loud" and that "this is one of the ghost films of all kinds." A Thinaboomi critic stated that "overall, the team has succeeded in making a simple story into an interesting horror film. "
