= N4 (film) =

- Theatrical release poster
- Directed by: Lokesh Kumar
- Written by: Lokesh Kumar
- Screenplay by: Lokesh Kumar
- Produced by: Naveen Sharma; Yogesh Sharma; Lokesh Kumar; Sagar Jayaram
- Starring: Michael Thangadurai; Gabriella Sellus; Afsal Hameed; Vinusha Devi; Anupama Kumar; Vadivukkarasi; Abhishek Shankar
- Cinematography: Divyank
- Edited by: Dani Charles
- Music by: Balasubramanian G
- Production companies: Dharmraj Films; Beyond The Limit Creations
- Release date: 24 March 2023
- Country: India
- Language: Tamil

N4 is a 2023 Indian Tamil-language crime-thriller film written and directed by Lokesh Kumar. The film stars Michael Thangadurai, Gabriella Sellus, Akshay Kamal, Afsal Hameed, Vinusha Devi, Pragya Nagra, and Anupama Kumar in pivotal roles whilst Abhishek Shankar, Vadivukkarasi, Azhagu and Subhalaxmi Parida play supporting roles.

== Cast ==
- Michael Thangadurai as Surya
- Gabriella Sellus as Soundharya
- Afsal Hameed as Karthi
- Vinusha Devi as Abhinaya
- Akshay Kamal as Vijay
- Pragya Nagra as Swathi
- Anupama Kumar as Fathima
- Abhishek Shankar as Rajarathinam
- Azhagu as Velu
- Vadivukkarasi as Kannamaa
- Akash Premkumar as John

== Production ==
In May 2018, actress Vani Bhojan announced her debut in N4 and said it will be directed Lokesh Kumar. However, in the middle of 2019 citing date issues, Vani stepped out of the film. The makers then announced that Airaa actress Gabriella Sellus has replaced her. The film was completely shot in and around Royapuram fishing harbour.

== Reception ==
The film was released on 24 March 2023 across Tamil Nadu. Logesh Balachandran of The Times of India gave 3 stars out of 5 and noted that "N4 is an honest attempt with intense emotions, and it's definitely worth watching." Sowmya Rajendran from The News Minute stated that "N4's central idea seems to have been to look at how an accidental crime exposes power equations and systemic prejudice, without casting anyone as a vicious villain" Maalai Malar critic gave 2.75 out of 5 and appreciated the film.
