= Aadukalam Murugadoss =

Indian actor

- Born: Perasamy Murugadoss; 29 August 1980 (age 46); Ariyankuppam, Puduchery, India
- Occupation: Actor
- Years active: 2004-present

P. Murugadoss (born Perasamy Murugadoss), popularly known as Aadukalam Murugadoss, is an Indian actor who has appeared in Tamil language films. He made his breakthrough in Vetrimaaran's critically acclaimed Aadukalam (2011), thus adding the name of the film as a prefix to create a stage name.

== Career ==
The actor was first seen in Ghilli (2004) as a team member of Vijay's Kabaddi team, featuring in several background shots throughout the film. He was also seen as one of the guard in film Kanchivaram (2008). His breakthrough came in Vetrimaaran's Aadukalam, where he portrayed Dhanush's loyal friend and the success of the venture saw the film's name being added as a prefix to his stage name. His role in Mounaguru as a mentally challenged person was also appreciated, with a critic from The Hindu noting he does a "wonderful cameo". He was then seen in pivotal characters as the lead actor's aide in the 2012 action films Thadaiyara Thaakka and Mugamoodi.

In 2013, he appeared as Sasikumar's friend in Kutti Puli, as one of the four main leads in Thagaraaru and also played a comedy role in Kan Pesum Vaarthaigal. Murugadoss was set to star in a lead role for the first time with Kalvargal, to be directed by Balamithran. He played one of the leads alongside Dinesh in Visaranai (2016). He made his solo lead debut with Raja Magal (2023).

== Filmography ==
Year	Title	Role	Notes
2004	Ghilli	Aadhivasi	
2006	Pudhupettai	Anbu's henchman	
2008	Kanchivaram	Guard	
2009	Vennila Kabadi Kuzhu		
2011	Aadukalam	Oole	
2011	Mounaguru	Babu	
2012	Thadaiyara Thaakka	Velu	
2012	Mugamoodi		
2013	Kan Pesum Vaarthaigal	Appukutty	
2013	Kutti Puli	Kutti Puli's friend	
2013	Thagaraaru	Aarumugam	
2014	Idhu Kathirvelan Kadhal	Kathirvelan's friend	
2014	Cuckoo	Gavas	
2014	Jigarthanda	Himself	Cameo appearance
2014	Sandiyar		
2015	Eetti	Pughazh's friend	
2016	Visaranai	Murugan	
2016	Anjala	Kalyana Raman	
2016	Virumandikkum Sivanandikkum	Shiva's friend	
2016	Saithan	Ravi	
2017	Kadamban		
2017	Richie	Murugesh	
2018	Merlin		also playback singer for "Aint No Sunshine"
2018	Iravukku Aayiram Kangal	Bharath's friend	
2018	96	Sathish	
2020	Kanni Maadam	Shankar	
2021	Nayae Peyae		
2021	Pyali		Malayalam movie
2022	Saani Kaayidham	Giri	
2022	O2	Bus Driver	
2023	Thalaikoothal		
2023	Raja Magal	Sundaram	
2023	Rangoli	Uthamar Gandhi	
2023	Nandhi Varman		
2024	Kaaduvetty		
2024	Eppura		
2025	Test	Kutty	
2025	Ten Hours	Maari, Bus Conductor	
2025	Good Day	Veni's husband	
2025	Phoenix		
2026	Mandaadi		
