= Karate Raja =

Indian actor

- Born: Natarajan; 19 January 1978 (age 48); Chidambaram
- Occupation: actor
- Years active: 1997–present

Karate Raja is an Indian actor who has worked in predominantly Tamil-language films. He made his breakthrough as an actor by playing a supporting role in Kamal Haasan's Virumaandi (2004), before garnering acclaim for playing the lead role of Veerappan in the serial Sandhan Kaadu on Makkal TV.

== Career ==
Natarajan made his breakthrough as an actor with his role in Kamal Haasan's Virumaandi (2004). He was given the name Karate Raja by Haasan. He subsequently appeared in two more popular Tamil films that year, Ghilli (2004) and Vasool Raja MBBS (2004). Raja later appeared in films including Prabhu Deva's Pokkiri (2007) and the horror comedy, Ambuli (2012). He played a notable role in Varnam (2011). He played Kishore's brother in Thiruvambadi Thamban (2012). He played the lead role of K. Chandrashekar Rao in the Telugu-language film Udyama Simham (2019).

On television, Karate Raja notably portrayed the lead role of Veerappan in the serial Sandhana Kaadu on Makkal TV during 2008. The directors spent three years on researching about the life of Veerappan and then spent 110 days in the forest and shoot in Tamil Nadu and Karnataka.

== Personal life ==
Karate Raja married Divya in July 2009 and has three daughters. In August 2014, Karate Raja filed a complaint to the police that his wife was missing. He later suggested that the pair had marital problems and only lived together for a few days on most months.

== Filmography ==
=== Tamil films ===
Year	Film	Role	Notes
1997	Nerrukku Ner	Suriya's friend	Uncredited role
2001	Citizen	Arivanandam MLA's friend	Uncredited role
2004	Virumaandi	Virumaandi's friend	
2004	Ghilli	Muthupandi's henchman	
2004	Madhurey	Kumarasamy	
2004	Vasool Raja MBBS	Raja's sidekick	
2005	Thirupaachi	Balu's henchman	
2005	Kannamma	Babu	
2005	Anbe Vaa	Gaja	
2005	Ghajini	Lakshman's henchman	Uncredited role
2005	Bambara Kannaley		
2005	Aanai		
2006	Aathi	Sadha	
2007	Pokkiri	Tamizh's friend	
2007	Piragu	David	
2007	Sivaji	Adiseshan then Sivaji's henchman	
2007	Azhagiya Tamil Magan	Runner in competition	
2008	Madurai Ponnu Chennai Paiyan	Maruthupandi	
2008	Pattaya Kelappu		
2008	Suryaa	Police Officer	
2009	Padikkadavan	Bhaskar	
2009	Thoranai	Rowdy	Bilingual film
2009	Unnaipol Oruvan	Ahmedallah	Bilingual film
2010	Kacheri Arambam	Sivamani's sidekick	
2010	Sura	Accused	
2010	Pa. Ra. Palanisamy	Johnson	
2010	Veluthu Kattu	Rasu Minor	
2010	Aarvam	Aadhi	
2011	Varnam	Muniyandi	
2011	Osthe	Daniel's henchman	
2012	Ambuli		
2012	Ishtam	Shankar	
2013	Sokkali		
2013	Bhuvanakkadu		
2014	Angusam	Anthony	
2014	Vetri Selvan		
2014	Poojai	Annathandavam's henchman	
2014	Sokku Sundaram		
2015	Sandamarutham	Bhaskar	
2015	En Vazhi Thani Vazhi	City Babu	
2015	Soan Papdi		
2015	Palakkattu Madhavan	Pattu Maami's son	
2016	Oyee	Babu	
2016	Pudhusa Naan Poranthen		
2017	Vaanga Vaanga		
2017	Saaya		
2017	Pannam Pathinonnum Seyum		
2018	Mannar Vagaiyara		
2019	Rocky: The Revenge	Police Officer	
2019	I-R 8		
2022	Naan Mirugamaai Maara	Rathinam	
2023	Kodai	Madhan	
2023	Theerkadarishi		
2023	Terror		
2024	Pambattam	Police officer	
2024	Kolai Thooram		
2024	Park		
2024	Dhil Raja		
2024	Orea Peachu Orea Mudivu		
2025	Yaman Kattalai		
2025	Padaiyaanda Maaveeraa	Veerappan	Cameo appearance
2025	Pagal Kanavu		
2026	Valluvan		

=== Other language films ===
Year	Film	Role	Language	Notes
2006	Bangaram	Bhooma Reddy's henchman	Telugu	
2007	Sketch	Narendra Shetty	Malayalam	
2009	Pistha	Rowdy	Telugu	Bilingual films
2009	Eenadu	Ahmedallah	Telugu	Bilingual films
2010	Lahore	C. Subramaniam	Hindi	
2010	Pokkiri Raja	Raja's Henchman	Malayalam	
2012	Thiruvambadi Thamban	Shiva	Malayalam	
2019	Udyama Simham	K. Chandrashekar Rao	Telugu	Lead role

== Television ==
Year	Serial/Program	Role	Channel
2007	Sandhanakaadu	Veerappan	Makkal TV
2017	Sembaruthi	Durai Manikkam	Zee Tamil
2021	Vidhya No. 1	Manickam	Zee Tamil
