= Racer (film) =

2023 Tamil film

- Official poster
- Directed by: Satz Rex
- Written by: Satz Rex
- Produced by: Kartik Jayas; Santhosh Krishnamurthy
- Starring: Akil Santhosh; Lavanya Anbazhagan; Aaru Bala; Subramanian Mathavan
- Cinematography: Prabhakar
- Edited by: Ajith NM
- Music by: Barath
- Production companies: Hustlers Entertainment; REDAL Mediaworks
- Distributed by: Action Reaction Films
- Release date: 7 April 2023
- Country: India
- Language: Tamil

Racer is a 2023 Indian Tamil-language sports drama film written and directed by Satz Rex and starring Akil Santhosh, Lavanya Anbazhagan, Aaru Bala, and Subramanian Mathavan in the lead roles.

The film was produced by Kartik Jayas and Santhosh Krishnamurthy under the banner of Hustlers Entertainment and REDAL MediaWorks. It was released on 7 April 2023.

== Cast ==
- Akil Santhosh as Ashwin
- Lavanya Anbazhagan
- Aaru Bala
- Subramanian Mathavan

== Production ==
The film was announced on 23 March 2023. The film was shot in Puducherry and Chennai. The film is noted as the debut film for director Satz Rex. During filming, the team used Ajith Kumar's BMW bike. The trailer of the film was released on 29 March 2023.

== Reception ==
The film was released on 7 April 2023 in Tamil Nadu. A critic from Dina Thanthi wrote that "The presence of real bike race players adds strength to the story." Jayabhuvaneshwari B, a critic of Cinema Express stated that "Another plus point of the film is that it does not promote illegal street racing in any way." and gave 2.5 stars out of 5. Logesh Balachandran, a critic from The Times of India gave 2.5 stars out of 5 and noted that "The technical aspects complement the story well, delivering a neat film. Racer does manage to finish decently, but isn't powerful enough to leave a lasting impact on the audience." A Maalai Malar critic gave it a 3 out of 5-star rating.
