= Siruvan Samuel =

- Directed by: Sadhu Burlington
- Produced by: Countryside Films
- Starring: Ajidhan Thavasimuthu; Vishnu KG
- Cinematography: Sivananth Gandhi
- Edited by: Ajith Stephen
- Music by: Mano/Stanley John
- Distributed by: Action Reaction Jenish
- Release date: 12 May 2023
- Running time: 90 minutes
- Country: India
- Language: Tamil

Siruvan Samuel (transl. Little Samuel) is a 2023 Indian Tamil-language family drama film written and directed by Sadhu Burlington. It is the first Tamil feature film from Kanyakumari.

== Cast ==
- Ajidhan Thavasimuthu as Sam
- Vishnu KG as Rajesh
- Aparna as Jeba Akka (Tution akka)

== Production ==
The trailer of the movie was released by Arya on 23 December 2022. Siruvan Samuel selected for Beijing International Children's Film Festival.

== Theatrical ==
Siruvan Samuel was released in theaters across Tamil Nadu on May 12, 2023.

== Reception ==
M Suganth critic of The Times of India gave 3 stars out of 5 and wrote that "The film's earnestness to provide a unique experience turns out to be its trump card that counterbalances its flaws." A critic from Kalki wrote that ""This boy Samuel will be a perfect choice for those who enjoy good works too. Boy Samuel - The First Step in Alternative Cinema. Jayabhuvaneshwari B critic of Cinema Express rated 2.5 out of 5 and wrote that "Siruvan Samuel ends with Ajidhan (who has won our hearts with his performance by now), drenching in the rain, as he repents for a small yet significant mistake he makes in the course of fulfilling his dream.". Bhuvanesh Chandar critic of The Hindu wrote that "Amateurish filmmaking sabotages a hearty tale".

A critic from Dina Thanthi wrote that "Director Sadhu Burlington has given the best work by realistically telling how children's world is in their eyes in a simple screenplay. The director's success is keeping the audience together with the lives of the characters."Maalai Malar critic rated 2.5 out of 5
