= Lokesh Kumar =

Indian film director, producer and screenwriter

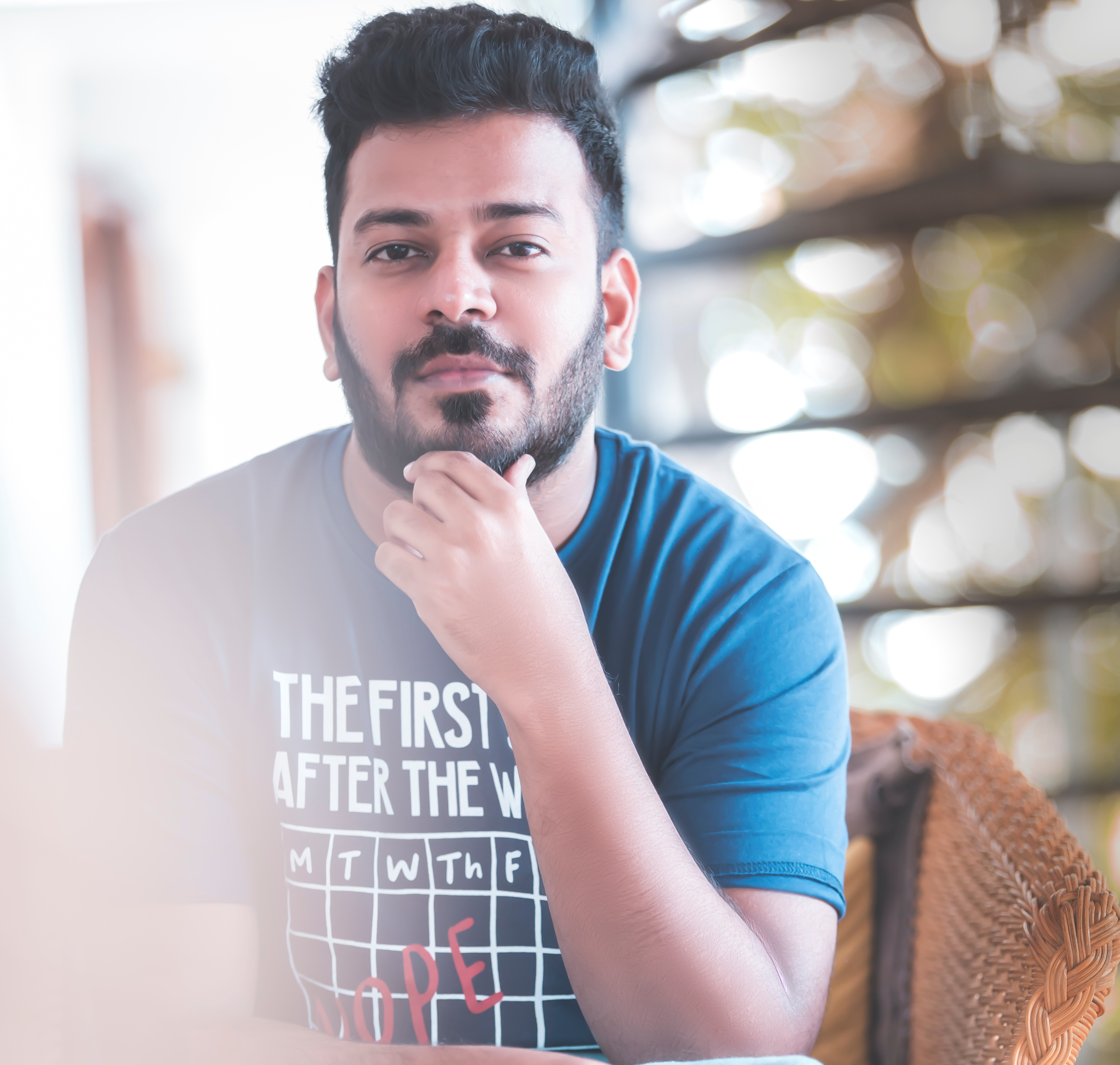
- Kumar in 2017
- Born: 29 June 1989 (age 36); Chennai, India
- Occupations: Film director, producer and screenwriter
- Years active: 2013–present

Lokesh Kumar (born 29 June 1989) is an Indian film director, producer and screenwriter. He is recognised for his Tamil language feature film My Son Is Gay.

== Life and career ==
Lokesh Kumar was born on 29 June 1989 in Chennai, Tamil Nadu (India). He did his schooling in Kalashetra Matriculation and Higher Secondary School, Chennai, after which he went to study Mechanical Engineering at S.A. Polytechnic College. After college he worked in the corporate sector for a few years. In 2013, he quit his corporate job and started making independent films. He made few experimental short films and by 2014, he decided to make an independent feature film which dealt with a teenage boy coming out to his mother, the film went through a lot of issues and delayed. By 2016, the film was fully completed with the help of an NRI producer Anil Saxena. His film My Son Is Gay is the first Tamil feature film on gay relationship in the 100 years of Tamil Cinema existence. The film was screened in several international film festivals and earned him many awards.

== Filmography ==
Year	Title	Notes			
Year	Title	Notes	2013	You're My Brother	Short film
2013	Wait a Minute	Short film			
2013	Judgement	Short film			
2014	Acid	Short film			
2015	Darkness	Short film			
2017	My Son Is Gay	Winner—Best Film, Indian World Film Festival; Winner—Best Of Out & Loud, Pune International Queer Film Festival; Winner—Best Debut Director, Dada Saheb Phalke Film Festival; Winner—Best Film, Jury Award, Jaffna International Cinema Festival			
2023	N4	Feature Film			
2024	The Last One (film)	Feature Film (In Pre-production)			
