= Yashika Aannand =

Indian actress and model

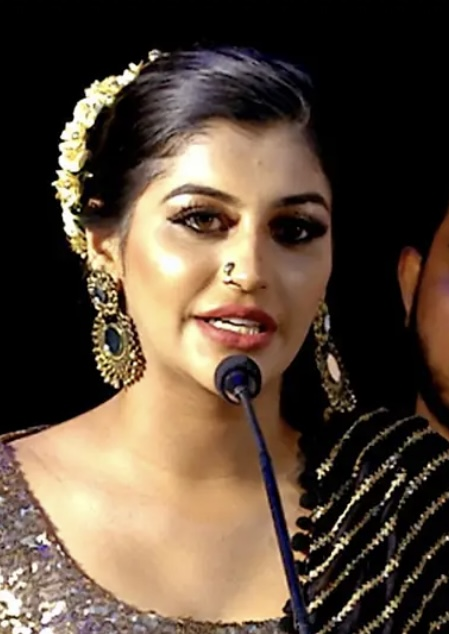
- Yashika in 2019
- Born: Yashika Aannand; 4 August 2000 (age 26); New Delhi, India
- Occupations: Actress; model; television Personality
- Years active: 2016–Present

Yashika Aannand (born 4 August 2000) is an Indian actress, model and television personality, who works predominantly in Tamil films and television shows.

== Early life ==
Yashika Aannand was born into a Punjabi Hindu family on 4 August 2000 in New Delhi. After her family moved to Chennai, she completed her schooling in Sherwood Hall school in Chetpet, Chennai.

== Career ==
Yashika began acting after being an Instagram model. At 14, she was filmed for Inimey Ippadithan (2015) alongside Santhanam but her role was later deleted after she could not attend a song shoot. She then portrayed a swimming instructor in Kavalai Vendam (2016), which became her first theatrical release.

Yashika's breakthrough was in the 2016 film, Dhuruvangal Pathinaaru. Shot on a small budget, the film was successful and won recognition for its cast members. She then appeared in Paadam (2018) and Thambi Ramaiah's Maniyaar Kudumbam (2018).

Yashika then appeared in Iruttu Araiyil Murattu Kuththu (2018), an adult comedy film. Shot in Thailand, the film featured her alongside other actresses such as Vaibhavi Shandilya and Chandrika Ravi and the film performed well at the box office. In 2018, Yashika appeared in the second season of the Bigg Boss Tamil reality show hosted by Kamal Haasan. She had earlier been approached to be in the inaugural season, but she refused the offer. She was evicted on day 98, finishing the show in fifth place. She also received the cash prize of 5 lakhs for winning certain tasks during the second season of the premiere program before getting evicted. She later appeared as a mentor in Star Vijay's Jodi Unlimited TV series, which aired in 2019.

Yashika then appeared in the animated zombie film Zombie as the lead actress.

In 2018, she was listed by the Chennai Times as the "most desirable woman on television."

In 2021, she received the Best Actress Award at the Las Vegas Independent Film Festival 2021 for the film Bestie.

=== MeToo allegations ===
In 2018, Yashika identified herself as a victim during the MeToo movement in India, where she alleged that a director had tried to abuse her by asking for sexual favors in order to gain a part in his film. She refused, and accused the director of harassing her.

== Personal life ==
=== 2021 Car accident ===
On 24 July 2021, Yashika was involved in a car crash in Mahabalipuram near Chennai and was critically injured during the crash. She was driving a speeding SUV with three friends when she lost control. The car hit a divider and overturned, causing the immediate death of her best friend, Vallichetti Bhavani. Yashika and two other men were badly hurt, with Yashika suffering multiple bone fractures that kept her bedridden for months.

The police filed a case against her for rash driving and causing death by negligence and also confiscated her driving license. In early 2023, she faced multiple court hearings. A non-bailable arrest warrant was issued by a Chengalpattu court in March 2023 after she failed to appear. The warrant was later recalled when she appeared in person to explain her absence.

== Filmography ==
Key
†	Denotes films that have not yet been released

=== Film ===
List of Yashika Aannand film credits
Year	Film	Role	Notes	Ref.
2016	Kavalai Vendam	Swimming Instructor	Uncredited	
2016	Dhuruvangal Pathinaaru	Shruti		
2017	Paadam	Hindi Teacher		
2018	Iruttu Araiyil Murattu Kuththu	Kaavya		
2018	Maniyaar Kudumbam	Herself	Special appearance in song "Adi Pappaali Pazhame"	
2018	NOTA	Shilpa		
2019	Kazhugu 2	Herself	Special appearance in song "Sakalakala Valli"	
2019	Zombie	Aishwarya		
2020	Mookuthi Amman	Herself	Special appearance in song "Bhagavathi Baba"	
2022	Bestie	Yashika		
2022	The Legend	Herself	Special Appearance in song "Mosalo Mosalu"	
2022	Kadamaiyai Sei	Aishwarya		
2023	Bagheera	Prabhu's victim	Cameo	
2023	Chaitra	Chaitra		
2023	Sila Nodigalil	Maya Pillai		
2023	Odavum Mudiyadhu Oliyavum Mudiyadhu			
2024	Double Tuckerr	Velvet Vennila		
2024	Weapon	Teresa		
2024	Jolly O Gymkhana	Herself	Special appearance in the song "Oosi Rosy"	
2025	Game Changer	Bystander	Telugu film; cameo	
2025	Rajabheema			
2025	Devil's Double Next Level	Devi / Maya		
2026	TN 2026	Kulkanth Kumar's girlfriend		

=== Television ===
List of performances and appearances on television
Year	Shows	Role	Channel	Notes
2017	Connexion Season 2	Participant	Vijay TV	Along with Balaji Murgadoss
2018	Maya	Devathai Raagini	Sun TV	
2018	Bigg Boss Tamil Season 2	Contestant	Vijay TV	Evicted 98; With Cash Prize 5 Lakhs
2018	Jodi Season 10: Fun Unlimited	Judge & Team Leader	Vijay TV	
2019	Bigg Boss Tamil Season 3	Guest	Vijay TV	Promotion For the Film Ivan Than Uthaman
2020	Roja	Herself	Sun TV	Guest Appearance
2021	Morattu Singles	Judge & Angel	Vijay TV	
2021	Bigg Boss Tamil season 5	Guest	Vijay TV	For Supporting Niroop Nandha Kumar
2022	Where is the Party - New Year Special	Guest	Vijay TV	
2022	Bigg Boss Ultimate -Grand Finale	Guest	Vijay TV	Dance Performance along with Amir
2022	Bigg Boss Tamil season 6	Guest	Vijay TV	To launch the season

=== Short films ===
List of performances in short films
Year	Film	Role	Notes
2017	MR.K Crime Series	Silk Smitha	Episode 16

=== Web series ===
List of performances in web series
Year	Title	Role	Platform	Notes
2019	Madras Meter Show	Guest	ZEE5	Episode 6
