= Arundhati Nair =

Indian actress

- Occupation: Actress
- Years active: 2014–present

Arundhati Nair is an Indian actress who is known for her work in Tamil and Malayalam films.

== Career ==
Arundhati starred in Ponge Ezhu Manohara (2014) and Virumandikkum Sivanandikkum (2016) before gaining recognition for her role as Vijay Antony's wife in Saithan (2016). In a review of the film by the Deccan Chroncicle, the critic noted that "Arundhati Nair too has played two good characters and she deserves good praise". She debuted in Malayalam with Ottakoru Kaamukan (2018) and portrayed the love interest if Shine Tom Chacko in the film. She plays one of the female leads in Pistha opposite Shirish Saravanan.

== Filmography ==
Films

Year	Film	Role	Language	Notes
2014	Pongi Ezhu Manohara	Anandhi	Tamil	
2016	Virumandikkum Sivanandikkum	Nandhini	Tamil	
2016	Saithan	Aishwarya / Jayalakshmi	Tamil	
2018	Ottakoru Kaamukan	Annie	Malayalam	
2020	Kanni Raasi	Herself	Tamil	Special appearance
2022	Pistha	Nandini	Tamil	
2023	Aayiram Porkaasukal	Poongothai	Tamil	
2024	Seeran	Yazhini	Tamil	

Television serials

Year	Title	Role	Channel	Language
2019-2020	Kerala Samajam	Riya	Asianet	Malayalam

Web series

Year	Title	Role	Channel	Language
2021	Padmini	Padmini	Premiere Padmini	Malayalam
2021	Don't think	Suja	Voot Colours	Tamil

== Road Accident ==
Arundhati Nair met with an accident on 14 March 2024 was travelling on a bike with her brother on Kovalam bypass road. She was on her way back after giving an interview to a YouTube channel. She is critically injured and fighting for her life and kept on a ventilator at the Ananthapuri Hospital in Trivandrum.
