= Va Varalam Va =

- Theatrical release poster
- Directed by: Suresh Babu R. L. G. Ravichandhar
- Written by: L. G. Ravichandhar
- Produced by: Suresh Babu R.
- Starring: Balaji Murugadoss; Mahana Sanjeevi; Redin Kingsley
- Cinematography: Karthik Raja
- Edited by: Raja Mohammad
- Music by: Deva
- Production company: SGS Creative Media
- Distributed by: SGS Creative Media
- Release date: 1 December 2023
- Running time: 139 minutes
- Country: India
- Language: Tamil

Va Varalam Va (transl. Come, you can come, come) is a 2023 Indian Tamil-language comedy drama film directed by Suresh Babu R. and L. G. Ravichandhar. The film stars Balaji Murugadoss and Mahana Sanjeevi in the lead roles, with Redin Kingsley in a supporting role. The film was produced by Suresh Babu under the banner of SGS Creative Media, and had a theatrical release on 1 December 2023. The film's title is based on a song from Bairavaa (2017).

== Cast ==
- Balaji Murugadoss
- Mahana Sanjeevi
- Redin Kingsley
- Gayatri Rema
- Mime Gopi
- Singampuli
- Saravana Subbiah
- Deepa Shankar
- Vaiyapuri
- Ashmitha Singh
- Bonda Mani
- Crane Manohar
- Vasu Vikram
- Meesai Rajendranath
- Bayilwan Ranganathan
- Bhavya Trikha in the song Unnai Thane

== Production ==
L. G. Ravichandar pitched the film's story to a number of actors including Raghava Lawrence and Santhanam but no actor showed interest before producer Suresh Babu chose to make the film. The film was announced to the media in October 2023, and promoted as the acting debut of Balaji Murugadoss, who had earlier competed in the Tamil reality television show Bigg Boss. Previously, Balaji had signed on to appear for a number of projects including Tyson, Siruthai Siva and Fire, which later became stalled.

== Soundtrack ==
The soundtrack album of Va Varalam Va was composed by Deva. It was released under the banner of SGS Creative Media / SGS Musicz.

Va Varalam Va – Soundtrack
Title	Lyrics	Singers
"Unnai Thane"	SBR	Ajaey Sharvan, Gayathry Rajiv
"Sulthana"	Kathal Mathi	Lavanya Jayamohan, Ajay Krishnaa
"Jillu Jillu"	Deva, Gaana Edwin	Deva, Gaana Edwin
"Sollaporen"	Kathal Mathi	Jithinraj

== Reception ==
A critic from Times Now rated the film at 2.5 out of 5 and stated that "it had the potential to be a good watch". A critic from Nakkheeran wrote that directors LG Ravichandar and SBR have given a spicy screenplay to be a complete entertainer for all parties without any smut.
