= Thiraiyin Marupakkam =

- Official poster
- Directed by: Nitin Samson
- Written by: Nitin Samson
- Produced by: Nitin Samson
- Starring: Mohammed Ghouse; Natarajan Manigandan; Hema Genelia
- Cinematography: Nitin Samson
- Edited by: Nishanth Samson
- Music by: Anil Nalan Chakravarthy; Rithik Madhavan
- Production company: 360 Degrees
- Release date: 20 October 2023
- Country: India
- Language: Tamil

Thiraiyin Marupakkam (transl. The other side of the screen) is a 2023 Indian Tamil-language crime thriller film written, produced, and directed by Nitin Samson. The film stars Mohammed Ghouse and Hema Genelia with Natarajan Manigandan, Nitin Samson, and Sree Risha in supporting roles. The film's music is composed by Anil Nalan Chakravarthy and Rithik Madhavan, while the cinematography is handled by Nitin Samson and editing is by Nishanth Samson.

== Cast ==
- Mohammed Ghouse as Sathyamoorthy
- Natarajan Manigandan as Director Senthil
- Hema Genelia as Kaveri
- Nitin Samson as Nitin
- Sree Risha

== Production ==
The film was shot in Chennai, Chengalpattu with some scenes shot in Florida.

== Reception ==
A critic from Maalai Malar wrote that "this film has beautifully pointed out the real situation happening in some places in the cinema industry." Dina Thanthi critic stated that "has been shown in a lively and interesting screenplay as an awareness film, can be appreciated."
