= Vivesini =

2023 Indian film by Bhavan Rajagopalan

- Theatrical release poster
- Directed by: Bhavan Rajagopalan
- Written by: Gajendran K.
- Starring: Nassar; Kavya as Shakthi; Suraj
- Cinematography: Om Narayan
- Edited by: R. Sudharsan
- Music by: Rishabh Nagendra
- Production company: Laburnum Productions
- Release date: 15 December 2023
- Country: India
- Language: Tamil

Vivesini (transl. Thinker) is a 2023 Indian Tamil-language drama film written and directed by Bhavan Rajagopalan. The film stars Nassar, Kavya and Suraj in the lead roles. The film was released theatrically on 15 December 2023.

== Cast ==
- Nassar as Jayaraman Kathirvelu
- Kavya as Shakthi
- Suraj as Varun
- Vanessa Stevenson as Alice Walker
- Vicky R
- Vishal Rajan
- Niveta
- Mekha Rajan as Clara Zetkin
- Gary Cordice as Charles Aniefuna
- Suresh Chakravarthi

== Production ==
Bhavan Rajagopalan began work on Vivesini in November 2019, with production eventually completed in 2021 owing to delays related to the COVID-19 pandemic. Nassar was the only senior actor cast in the film, with rookie actors Kavya and Mekha Rajan also selected for pivotal roles.

== Release and reception ==
Prior to the release of the film, it was showcased at screenings in the UK during January and July 2023.

The film had a theatrical release on 15 December 2023 across Tamil Nadu. A critic from ABP News gave the film a positive review and predicted that it would have a good run on a streaming platform. A reviewer from Maalaimalar praised the plot of the film.
