= Yen Peyar Anandhan =

2020 Indian film by Sridhar Venkatesan

- Directed by: Sridhar Venkatesan
- Produced by: Sridhar Venkatesan; Gopi Krishnappa
- Starring: Santhosh Prathap; Athulya Ravi; Deepak Paramesh
- Cinematography: Mano Raja
- Edited by: Vijay Andrews
- Music by: Jose Franklin
- Production companies: Savitha Cine Arts; Kaavya Productions
- Release date: 27 November 2020
- Running time: 98 minutes
- Country: India
- Language: Tamil

Yen Peyar Anandhan (transl. My Name is Anandhan) is a 2020 Tamil language thriller film directed by Sridhar Venkatesan and starring Santhosh Prathap and Athulya Ravi in the lead roles. It was released on 27 November 2020.

== Cast ==
- Santhosh Prathap as Sathya
- Athulya Ravi as Savithri
- Arun Asthma as Anandhan
- Deepak Paramesh as Anwar
- Aravind Rajagopal as Parthiban
- Arun Ragav as Iyarkai
- Teejay Karthi as Karthi
- Divya as Charulatha
- Madhan as the narrator

== Production ==
Sridhar Venkatesan had previously made the Sithiram Kolluthadi segment in the anthology film, 6 Athiyayam (2018). Santhosh Prathap and Deepak Paramesh were cast in the lead roles, while Athulya Ravi signed on to play the lead female role in early 2018.

In November 2020, the makers spoke out against Athulya for refusing to promote the film.

== Release and reception ==
Before its theatrical release, the film was selected to be a part of the Sardar Vallabhbhai Patel International Film Festival.

The film was released on 27 November 2020. The Times of India gave the film two-and-a-half out of five stars, noting "even if we don't have to buy into the film's ideas, the earnestness with which it goes about its work kind of makes us look upon it a bit more favorably". Maalaimalar gave the film a middling review concluding that its premise was unclear.
