= Kuruvadipatti =

- village
- Nickname: kuruvadi
- Country: India
- State: Tamil Nadu
- District: Thanjavur
- Taluk: Thanjavur
- Founder: உடையார்

Population (2022)
  - Total: 3,000

Languages
  - Official: Tamil
- Time zone: UTC+5:30 (IST)
- Postal code: 613601

Kuruvadipatti is a village in the Thanjavur taluk of Thanjavur district, Tamil Nadu, India. It is located 12 kilometres from Thanjavur town on the Thanjavur-Trichy highway.

== Demographics ==
As per the 2001 census, Kuruvadipatti had a total population of 873 with 414 males and 459 females. The sex ratio was 1109. The literacy rate was 67.81.
