= Anupama Kumar =

Indian actress (born 1974)

- Born: 4 December 1974 (age 51); Coimbatore, Tamil Nadu, India
- Other name: Anupama Prakash Kumar
- Occupations: Actress, producer, model, anchor, television producer
- Years active: 2001–present
- Spouse: G. Shivakumar
- Children: 1

Anupama Prakash Kumar (born 4 December 1974) is an Indian actress and model. Having appeared in more than 300 commercials, she made her debut as an actress in the 2001 Hindi television series Talaaq Kyu before being recognised for her roles in Cheran's Pokkisham and Sarpatta Parambarai in Tamil. She went on to play supporting roles in mostly Tamil films.

Besides acting and modelling, Anupama has also worked as a journalist, television anchor, and television producer. She played mother roles in several films including Muppozhudhum Un Karpanaigal (2012) and Sarpatta Parambarai (2021).

== Career ==
Born at Coimbatore, Tamil Nadu, Anupama mostly lived in North India. She had been working in television for over thirteen years, working as an anchor, visualiser, journalist and producer. Later she started modelling and acting, appearing in more than 300 commercials. She had appeared in several Hindi language television series such as Kabhi Aaye Na Judaai, Mission Fateh, Shaka Laka Boom Boom and The Magic Make-Up Box as well. Kumar debuted in Indian films with Partha (2003) before appearing in the 2010 film Ishqiya in a photograph appearance.

== Filmography ==
=== Tamil films ===
Year	Film	Role	Notes
2009	Pokkisham	Mrs. Lenin	
2010	Vamsam	Meenakshi	
2010	Ayyanar	Mahalakshmi	
2011	Aadu Puli	Kalaiarasi	
2012	Muppozhudhum Un Karpanaigal	Meenakshi	Won - Vijay Award for Best Supporting Actress
2012	Mugamoodi	Mrs. Gaurav	
2012	Thuppakki	Nisha's mother	
2012	Neerparavai	Benita	
2012	Neethaane En Ponvasantham	Varun's mother	
2013	Ponmaalai Pozhudhu	Lakshmi	
2013	Moodar Koodam	Mandodiri	
2014	Vallinam		
2014	Yennamo Yedho	Lakshmi	
2014	Irumbu Kuthirai	Samyuktha's aunt	
2014	Meagamann	Bharathi	
2014	Oru Oorla Rendu Raja	Chandrika	
2015	Maha Maha	Aunty	
2015	Indru Netru Naalai	Anu's mother	
2015	Valiyavan	Selvi	
2015	Aarathu Sinam	Sharadha	Cameo Appearance
2017	Motta Shiva Ketta Shiva	Minister Abhirami	
2017	Thiri	Jeeva's mother	
2017	Kootathil Oruthan	Janani's mother	
2017	Solo		
2017	My Son Is Gay	Lakshmi	Also co-director and co-producer
2018	Eghantham		
2018	Raja Ranguski	Maria / Mary	
2018	Aan Devathai	Lakshmi	
2019	Thirumanam	Lakshmi	
2019	Kanchana 3	Radhamma	
2019	Vennila Kabaddi Kuzhu 2	Chinnathaayi	
2020	Dharala Prabhu	Vaanathi	
2020	Asuraguru	Diya's mother	
2021	Sila Nerangalil Sila Manithargal		
2021	Sarpatta Parambarai	Bakkiyam	Winner: Norway Tamil Film Festival - Best Supporting Actress; Winner: Galatta Crown Award - Best Supporting Actor Female; Nominated: Filmfare Award for Best Supporting Actress – Tamil
2021	Pei Mama		
2022	Kalaga Thalaivan	Bharathi	
2023	N4	Fathima	
2023	Pizza 3: The Mummy	Rani	
2023	Are You Ok Baby?	Gopika Vijayakumar	
2023	Jigiri Dosthu		
2024	Hit List	Latha Periyasami	
2024	Miss You	Vasu's mother	
2024	Mazaiyil Nanaigiren		
2025	Aan Paavam Pollathathu	Bharathi	
2026	John Doe	Latha Kurien	

=== Telugu films ===
Year	Film	Role
2009	Aa Okkadu	Sri Krishna's wife
2012	Yeto Vellipoyindhi Manasu	Varun's mother
2013	Gouravam	Arjun's mother
2017	Goutham Nanda	Goutham's mother

=== Hindi films ===
Year	Film	Role	Notes
2004	Kyun! Ho Gaya Na...	Adoptive parent	
2010	Ishqiya	Manju	Photo role
2013	David	Zainab	

=== Other language films ===
Year	Film	Role	Language	Notes
2003	Partha	Anu	Kannada	Uncredited role
2017	Solo		Malayalam	

== Television ==
Year	Program	Role	Language	Notes
2001	Talaaq Kyu		Hindi	
2001-03	Kabhi Aaye Na Judaai		Hindi	
2002-08	Bhabhi		Hindi	
2002-04	Shaka Laka Boom Boom		Hindi	
2003	The Magic Make-Up Box		Hindi	
2003	Mission Fateh		Hindi	
2003	Galati Kiski		Hindi	
2005	Kaun Anadi Kaun Khiladi		Hindi	
2018	Nila Nila Odi Vaa	Devi	Tamil	Web Series on Viu
2026	Bandwaale	Valsala	Hindi	Prime Video TV show

== Music Video ==
Year	Album	Singer	Lyricist	Composer	Director	Language	Notes
2012	"Tata Nano"	Dhanush & Blaaze	Dhanush	Anirudh Ravichander	Vetrimaaran	Hindi	
