= Santhosh Prathap =

Indian actor

- Born: 2 June 1987 (age 39)
- Occupation: Actor
- Years active: 2014–present

Santhosh Prathap is an Indian actor working in the Tamil film industry. His feature film debut was in the lead role Kathai Thiraikathai Vasanam Iyakkam (2014). In 2022, he participated in the popular cooking show Cooku with Comali (season 3) as a contestant in Vijay television.

== Career ==
Santhosh made his acting debut with Kathai Thiraikathai Vasanam Iyakkam (2014) directed by R. Parthiban. Portraying a struggling director who wants to make a mark in cinema, the film released to positive reviews. After a brief sabbatical, he made his comeback with Dhayam (2017), a thriller which was set completely in a single room. He was first seen in a negative role in Mr. Chandramouli (2018). Later, he acted in lead role in films such as Pancharaaksharam (2019), Irumbu Manithan (2020) and Yen Peyar Anandhan (2020).

In 2024, Santhosh starred in three Tamil projects - Sundar C's Aranmanai 4, Halitha Shameem's Minmini (in a cameo appearance) and the ZEE5 web series Aindham Vedham. In the Tamil thriller series The Game: You Never Play Alone (2025), Santhosh Prathap plays a video game developer.

== Filmography ==
Key
†	Denotes films that have not yet been released

List of film credits
Year	Title	Role	Notes
2014	Kathai Thiraikathai Vasanam Iyakkam	Thamizh	Nominated—Vijay Award for Best Debut Actor
2017	Dhayam	Ashwin Augustin	
2017	Bayama Irukku	Jai	
2018	Mr. Chandramouli	Vinayak Kanakasabai	
2019	Podhu Nalan Karudhi	Napoleon	
2019	Dev	Harish	
2019	Naan Avalai Sandhitha Pothu	Moorthy	
2019	Pancharaaksharam	Dushyanth	
2020	Oh My Kadavule	Krishna	
2020	Irumbu Manithan	Sundharam	
2020	Yen Peyar Anandhan	Sathya	
2021	Sarpatta Parambarai	Raman	
2022	Kathir	Savithri's husband	
2022	Ori Devuda	Krishna	Telugu film
2023	Dear Death	Death	
2023	Kondraal Paavam	Arjunan	
2023	Pathu Thala	CM Arunmozhi	
2023	Maruthi Nagar Police Station	Bala	
2023	Kazhuvethi Moorkkan	Bhoominathan	
2023	The Road	Anand	
2024	Aranmanai 4	Santhosh	
2024	Minmini	Sid	Cameo appearance
2025	Champion	Babu Deshmukh	Telugu film
2026	Leader	Robert, Yuvaraj (Devil) & Martin	Triple role
2026	Moondram Kan	Shanmugam's mind	
2026	Eegai †	V. Arun	Filming

=== Television ===
Year	Title	Role	Network	Notes
2019	Police Diary 2.0	Officer Kathir Vel	ZEE5	
2021	Kuruthi Kalam	Vijay	MX Player	
2022	Cooku with Comali - Season 3	Contestant	Star Vijay	4th runner-up
2022	Aanandham Aarambham	Ram Charan	Disney+ Hotstar	Micro Series
2022	Kana Kaanum Kalangal season 2	'Rockstar' Ashok	Disney+ Hotstar	Cameo Appearance
2022	Fall	Daniel	Disney+ Hotstar	
2024	Aindham Vedham	Pathi	ZEE5	
2025	The Game: You Never Play Alone	Anoop	Netflix	Premieres on 2 October
