= Thinaboomi =

Tamil language newspaper

- Type: Daily newspaper
- Format: Broadsheet
- Editor: S. Manimaran
- Founded: 1999
- Language: Tamil
- Headquarters: Madurai, Tamil Nadu
- Website: thinaboomi.com

Thinaboomi is a Tamil daily newspaper headquartered in Madurai, Tamil Nadu. The newspaper was established in the late 1990s by S. Manimaran. It is printed and published from Chennai, Coimbatore, Madurai, Salem, Tiruchirappalli, Tirunelveli, Vellore and Pondicherry.

== History ==
In 2010, Thinaboomi's editor S. Manimaran and his son Ramesh Kumar were arrested by the police. The pair subsequently alleged they were harassed due to political pressure as a result of covering the Madurai granite scandal. In the following years, the Press Council of India and the newly elected Tamil Nadu government supported the editor in his case to get the case dropped.
