= Aal (film) =

2014 Indian film by Ananda Krishnan

- Film poster
- Directed by: Ananda Krishnan
- Written by: Ananda Krishnan; Raj Kumar Gupta
- Produced by: Vidiyal Raju
- Starring: Vidharth; Hardika Shetty; Vidiyal Raju
- Cinematography: N. S. Uthayakumar
- Edited by: M. Ramesh Bharathi
- Music by: Johan Shevanesh
- Production company: Shoundaryan Pictures
- Release date: 19 September 2013
- Country: India
- Language: Tamil

Aal (transl. Person) is a 2013 Indian Tamil-language action thriller film written and directed by Ananda Krishnan in his directorial debut and produced by Vidiyal Raju. A remake of the 2008 Hindi film Aamir, which itself is inspired by the Filipino film Cavite, it stars Vidharth, Hardika Shetty, and Vidiyal Raju in the lead roles. The background score and soundtrack were composed by Johan Shevanesh with cinematography by N. S. Uthayakumar and editing by M. Ramesh Bharathi. The film released on 19 September 2014 to negative reviews from critics.

== Plot ==
The film is about the life of an ordinary man facing an extraordinary situation in a single day. The story starts in Sikkim and travels with a grip towards the climax in Chennai. The film screens about how the youngsters are brought to the terrorism. Amir is an intelligent professor who has already been in love with Meenakshi, who works in Sikkim. When Amir goes back to Chennai, he is blackmailed into joining a terrorist organization that would hold his family and Meenakshi captive. Then, the extraordinary things happen in one day.

== Cast ==
- Vidharth as Aamir
- Hardika Shetty as Meenatchi
- Vidiyal Raju as the leader
- James as Rizwan
- Rajkumar as Swamy
- Malaika as Shabnam
- Jayabalu as Lal
- Asraf as Aamir's mother
- Abdullah Baig as Aamir's brother
- Hema Malini as Aamir's sister
- Suresh Kumar as Meenatchi's father
- Peeba as Meenatchi's mother

== Production ==
The makers of the film noted that they managed to shoot the film in parts in Parry's Corner, making it the first film to do so in forty years. Similarly Anna Salai was used as a filming location for the first time in nearly twenty years. Scenes were also shot in Gangtok in Sikkim, a location not shown before in Tamil films. The tagline of the film is ‘Who says a man writes his own destiny?’

== Soundtrack ==
Aal

Soundtrack album by Johan Shevanesh
- Released: 2014
- Genre: Feature film soundtrack
- Length: 42:27
- Language: Tamil
- Label: Saregama
- Producer: Johan Shevanesh

Johan Shevanesh chronology
Kollaikaran (2012)	Aal (2014)	Metro (2016)

The film score and soundtrack were composed by Johan Shevanesh.

No.	Title	Lyrics	Singer(s)	Length
1.	"Poda. Po, Pt. 1"		Hariharan	4:44
2.	"Dammal Dammal"	Ananda Krishnan	Blaaze, Simran	3:49
3.	"Androru Naal"		Vijay Prakash	5:30
4.	"Oor Aal"		Haricharan, Prathi	4:12
5.	"Poda. Po, Pt. 2"		Hariharan	5:34
6.	"The Leader (Instrumental)"			3:33
7.	"Red Suitcase (Instrumental)"			4:20
8.	"One Mans Blood (Instrumental)"			4:48
9.	"Hot Freeze (Instrumental)"			2:36
10.	"My Name Is Aamir (Instrumental)"			3:21
Total length:				42:27
