= Bheemadevarapally Branchi =

2023 Telugu comedy drama film

- Theatrical release poster
- Directed by: Ramesh Cheppala
- Written by: Ramesh Cheppala
- Produced by: Dr. Keerthi Latha Goud Bathini; Ch. Raja Narendar
- Starring: Anji Valguman; Sai Prasanna Kondra; Abhiram Vollala
- Cinematography: K. Chitti Babu
- Edited by: Bonthala Nageswara Reddy
- Music by: Charan Arjun
- Production companies: AB Cinemass; Nihal Productions
- Distributed by: Mythri Movie Makers
- Release date: 9 June 2023
- Running time: 134 minutes
- Country: India
- Language: Telugu

Bheemadevarapally Branchi is a 2023 Indian Telugu-language comedy drama film directed by Ramesh Cheppala and professor K. Nageshwar has a key role in the movie. V. V. Lakshminarayana, popularly known as 'JD' Lakshmi Narayana, is also part of the cast. The film also features Anji Valguman, Sai Prasanna Kondra, and Abhiram Vollala in lead roles.

== Plot ==
Jampanna receives fifteen lakh rupees in his bank account and assumes he has received the cash in his 'Zero Account' as promised by a political leader. Soon, the bank claims that the money was transferred by mistake, but he has spent all the money. For the rest of the story, Jampanna faces the consequences of his actions and learns from them.

== Cast ==
- Anji Valguman as Jampanna
- Sai Prasanna Kondra as Swaroopa
- Abhiram Vollala as Abhi
- Rupa Srinivas as Kaveri
- Gaddam Naveen as Lingam
- Subhodayam Subbarao
- Sudhakar Reddy Kethiri as Kothi Shankaraiah
- V. V. Lakshminarayana
- Rajavva
- Sudhakar Reddy
- Keerthy Latha
- Abhi
- K. Nageshwar
- Addanki Dayakar

== Production ==
The film was directed by Ramesh Cheppala, who earlier directed the film Bewars, and produced by Bathini Keerthi Latha Goud and Ch. Raja Narendar under the banners of AB Cinemass and Nihal Productions. The cinematography of the film was done by K. Chitti Babu, and the editing of the film was done by Bonthala Nageswara Reddy. The teaser for the film was launched by the Minister of Municipal Administration and Urban Development of Telangana, K. T. Rama Rao, on 9 February 2023.

== Soundtrack ==
Charan Arjun composed the music along with the background score, distribution rights were acquired by Aditya Music.

Bheemadevarapally Branchi

Soundtrack album by Charan Arjun
- Released: 2023
- Recorded: 2022
- Genre: Feature film soundtrack
- Length: 18:09
- Language: Telugu
- Label: Aditya Music
- Producer: Charan Arjun

External audio
- Bheemadevarapally Branchi - Full Songs Jukebox on YouTube

== Release ==
Bheemadevarapally Branchi was released on 9 June 2023 to mixed-to-positive reviews from critics and audiences, alike.
