= Metro Shirish =

Indian film actor

- Born: Shirish Saravanan; Chennai, Tamil Nadu, India
- Occupation: actor
- Years active: 2016 – present
- Known for: Metro

Shirish Saravanan, known also as Metro Shirish for his work in his debut film Metro, is an actor from Tamil film industry.

== Career ==
It was in college, that he met Ananda Krishnan, who after conducting an audition decided to cast him as the lead in his next movie. His performance in Ananda Krishnan's Metro garnered him rave reviews with many critics appreciating his notable performance in the movie along with Filmfare's award for Best Male Debut-South. In 2018, he acted in Raja Ranguski with director Dharanidharan is alongside Chandini Tamilarasan. His next film, which started filming in August 2017, is a village based entertainer titled Pistha, which is directed by the editor of Metro, Ramesh Bharathi. Mrudula Murali and Arundhati Nair are the lady leads. Notably, this film will be music director Dharan's 25th project.

== Filmography ==
Key
†	Denotes films that have not yet been released

Year	Film	Role	Notes
2016	Metro	Arivazhagan	Won—Filmfare Award for Best Male Debut – South; Won—Edison Award for Best Debut Actor
2018	Raja Ranguski	Raja	
2021	Blood Money	Sudhan	
2022	Pistha	Saravanan	
