= Mrudula Murali =

Indian actress and model (born 1990)

- Born: Mrudula Murali; 8 June 1990 (age 36); Ernakulam, Kerala, India
- Occupations: Actress; Model; Television anchor; Classical dancer
- Years active: 2009–present
- Spouse: Nitin Malini Vijay (m.2020)
- Relatives: Mithun Murali (Brother)

Mrudula Murali Mangalasseri (born 8 June 1990), credited as Mrudula Murali, is an Indian actress, model, anchor and classical dancer. She appears in Malayalam and Tamil films.

== Personal life ==
Mrudula was born to Muralidharan Nair, who is working as an engineer in F.A.C.T Kalamassery, and Latha Menon in Ernakulam, Kerala. She completed her secondary education at Assisi Vidyaniketan Public School, Ernakulam. She has a bachelor's degree from St. Teresa's College, Ernakulam and PG degree in Media studies at M.O.P. Vaishnav College for Women, Chennai. Her only brother Mithun Murali is also an actor-cum-model. Mridula Murali married Nitin Malini Vijay, who's an aspiring filmmaker; currently working on the advertisement front, on 29 October 2020.

== Career ==
Mrudula started as a child anchor in the program Dial & See telecast in Jeevan TV along with her brother Midhun Murali as co-anchor. She has acted numerous ad-films in Tamil and Malayalam and also shot for a Tamil film, the Ilaiyaraaja musical Kangalum Kavipaduthey in 2007, which did not get a theatrical release. She stepped into the film industry with the Malayalam film Red Chillies. She received critical acclaim for her role as Shenbagavalli in her debut Tamil film Nagaraja Cholan MA, MLA.

She had no theatrical releases in 2014 but appeared in a short film titled Maniyara. Her Tamil film Chikkiku Chikkikkichu is a romantic comedy that unfolds during a train journey. She has been signed as one of the female leads in the Malayalam films Enthoru Bhagyam, which will feature her as Heera Samson, a modern girl from Bangalore, who is "bubbly and lively".

Mrudula Murali got her major breakthrough with the Bollywood movie Raagdesh, where she played Captain Lakshmi Sehgal. The movie and her role received praise from various corners. Her acting and dialogue received special mention in reviews. She at present is acting in the Tamil movie Pistha, starring Metro Shirish and also in Maniyaar Kudumbam, directed by Thambi Ramaiah, starring his son Umapathy.

== Filmography ==
Year	Film	Role	Language	Notes
2009	Red Chillies	Varadha Battadirippadu	Malayalam	
2009	Mercury Pookkal	Sapna	Malayalam	Musical album
2010	Elsamma Enna Aankutty	Sherine	Malayalam	
2013	10:30 am Local Call	Ann	Malayalam	
2013	Nagaraja Cholan MA, MLA	Shenbagavalli	Tamil	
2014	Maniyara	Bride	Malayalam	Short film
2015	Ayal Njanalla	Isha	Malayalam	
2015	Chikkiku Chikkikkichu	Varsha	Tamil	
2015	Celebrate Happiness	Herself	Malayalam	Video song
2016	Shikhamani	Devika	Malayalam	
2017	Raagdesh	Lakshmi Sehgal	Hindi	
2018	Maniyaar Kudumbam	Magizhampoo	Tamil	
2022	Pistha	Selvi	Tamil	

== Television ==
- Dial & See (Jeevan TV)
- The Happiness Project (Kappa TV) as Associate producer
- Katturumbu (Flowers TV)
- Ambalappuzha Palppayasam (Mazhavil Manorama)
- Dhe Chef (Mazhavil Manorama)
- Sadhya Rice - advertisement
- Thangamayil Jewellery Limited - advertisement
