= Robber (film) =

2025 film by SM Pandi

- Theatrical release poster
- Directed by: SM Pandi
- Written by: Ananda Krishnan; SM Pandi
- Story by: Ananda Krishnan
- Produced by: Kavitha S; Ananda Krishnan
- Starring: Sathya; Daniel Annie Pope; Deepa Shankar; Jayaprakash; Sendrayan
- Cinematography: N. S. Uthayakumar
- Edited by: N. B. Srikanth
- Music by: Johan Shevanesh
- Production companies: Impress Films; Metro Productions
- Distributed by: Sakthi Film Factory
- Release date: 14 March 2025
- Country: India
- Language: Tamil

Robber is a 2025 Indian Tamil-language crime thriller film directed by SM Pandi and written by Ananda Krishnan. The screenplay and dialogues were jointly written by SM Pandi and Ananda Krishnan, starring Sathya in the lead role, alongside Daniel Annie Pope, Deepa Shankar, Jayaprakash, Sendrayan, Nishanth, and ‘Raja Rani’ Pandiyan in supporting roles.

Robber released in theatres on 14 March 2025.

== Cast ==
- Sathya as Sathya
- Daniel Annie Pope
- Deepa Shankar as Sathya's mother
- Jayaprakash
- Sendrayan
- Nishanth
- ‘Raja Rani’ Pandiyan

== Production ==
In late-April 2024, Sivakarthikeyan released the first-look poster of the film titled Robber starring Metro (2016) fame Sathya in the lead role, directed by SM Pandi. The story of this film is written by Ananda Krishnan, of Metro fame and also has contributed towards the screenplay and dialogues along with SM Pandi. The film is jointly produced by Kavitha S under her Impress Films banner along with Ananda Krishnan's Metro Productions banner. Apart from Sathya, the film also features Daniel Annie Pope, Deepa Shankar, Jayaprakash, Sendrayan, Nishanth, ‘Raja Rani’ Pandiyan and others in supporting roles.

The technical team consists of Johan Shevanesh as the music composer, NS Uthaya Kumar as the cinematographer, N. B. Srikanth as the editor, and C Mahesh as the stunt choreographer. Principal photography took place in the neighbourhoods of Chennai including T. Nagar, Velachery, Semmencherry, East Coast Road, and Old Mahabalipuram Road and got completed during the time of announcement.

== Release ==
Robber released in theatres on 14 March 2025. The film is released by Sakthi Film Factory in Tamil Nadu.

== Reception ==
Roopa Radhakrishnan of The Times of India gave 1.5/5 stars and wrote "Even though the written material isn't great in itself, the film could have definitely fared better if it had been handled with more finesse.[...] Robber is one of those films where the execution doesn't help elevate the script and rather brings it down several notches." Dinamalar critic rated 2.5/5 for the film, praising Ananda Krishnan's story, screenplay and dialogues and the performances of the lead actors, while criticizing the making and logical contraventions.
