= Pistha (2022 film) =

2022 Tamil language drama film

- Promotional poster
- Directed by: M. Ramesh Baarathi
- Written by: M. Ramesh Baarathi
- Produced by: Sambasivam
- Starring: Metro Shirish; Mrudula Murali; Sathish
- Cinematography: M. Vijay
- Edited by: M. Ramesh Baarathi
- Music by: Dharan Kumar
- Production company: One Man Productions
- Release date: 7 October 2022
- Country: India
- Language: Tamil

Pistha is a 2022 Indian Tamil-language drama film written and directed by M. Ramesh Baarathi and starring Metro Shirish and Mrudula Murali. It was released on 7 October 2022.

== Cast ==
- Metro Shirish as Sandhai Saravanan
- Mrudula Murali as Selvi
- Arundhati Nair as Nandhinee
- Sathish as Sathish
- Senthil
- Namo Narayana as Mahal Owner
- Yogi Babu as Mark Babu
- Chandini as Bride alliance
- G. Gnanasambandam as Kamal Haasan (Saravanan's father)
- Swaminathan as Gemini Ganesan (Saravanan"s grandfather)
- Mahanadi Shankar as catering owner
- Bava Lakshmanan as Saravanan's relative
- Supergood Subramani
- Rangammal

== Production ==
Ramesh Bharathi, the editor of Metro (2016), announced that he would work with actor Shirish on a comedy entertainer titled Pistha in July 2017. The shoot began during August 2017, with a number of notable supporting actors including Sathish, Yogi Babu and Senthil joining the cast. Production progressed slowly, with a five-year delay between the film's start and release.

Prior to the film's release, it was marketed as the 25th film of music composer Dharan Kumar.

== Music ==
- "Azhagula Rasathi" - Yuvan Shankar Raja
- "Vaa Vaa" - Ranina Reddy, Ramesh

== Reception ==
The film was released on 7 October 2022 across Tamil Nadu. A critic from Maalai Malar gave the film a mixed review, noting that "the effort should have been better". A reviewer from Times of India gave the film a negative review, writing it was "a below average mindless rural entertainer". The film also received mixed reviews from critics at The Hindu, Dinamalar and Dina Thanthi.
