= Raja Ranguski =

- Directed by: Dharani Dharan
- Written by: Dharani Dharan
- Produced by: Dharani Dharan
- Starring: Metro Shirish; Chandini Tamilarasan; Anupama Kumar; Kalloori Vinoth
- Cinematography: D. K. Yuvaa
- Edited by: Shafique Mohamed Ali
- Music by: Yuvan Shankar Raja
- Production companies: Vasan Productions, Burma Talkies
- Release date: 21 September 2018
- Running time: 120 minutes
- Country: India
- Language: Tamil

Raja Ranguski is a 2018 Tamil-language drama thriller film written, produced and directed by Dharani Dharan. The film stars Metro Shirish and Chandini Tamilarasan, with the former playing the title role of Raja while the latter playing the title role of Ranguski, while Anupama Kumar and Kalloori Vinoth play supporting roles. The music was composed by Yuvan Shankar Raja, with cinematography by D. K. Yuvaa and editing by Shafiq Muhammad Ali. The film was released on 21 September 2018 and received mixed reviews.

== Plot ==
Raja is a police constable who lives with his colleague Baskar. He falls in love with Ranguski, an aspiring writer. He often visits Maria, a senior citizen living in a villa community, who has demanded police protection as she is an antique collector and possesses many valuables. Maria and Ranguski live in the same housing complex. Raja tries to woo Ranguski by prank calling her in the name of a stranger and forcing her to love him instead. As Ranguski is frustrated by this, she falls in love with Raja.

To Raja's surprise, he finds that Ranguski still receives such calls from a stranger. Soon, he too receives such calls, and the caller threatens to kill Ranguski. Raja rushes to Ranguski's home to save her, but he finds out that the killer has killed Maria instead. With circumstances proving that Raja is the killer, he plans to work with Baskar and Ranguski to find the real killer. They deduce that the killer is also part of the villa community. When Raja goes to meet a photographer who claims to know who the real killer is, he finds the latter has been murdered. He is then arrested by CBCID officer KK but manages to escape custody and reunite with Ranguski and Baskar. Raja says that while at Maria's house on the day of the murder, he saw a man with a tattoo on his forearm. They then track down that man, John. John says that he went to Maria's house looking for the highly valuable Gutenberg Bible but found her already dead.

Raja then asks Ranguski to meet KK and hand him a recording of John's confession. They then find John dead. Raja receives a call, which seems to indicate that Ranguski has been kidnapped. The police then rounds up Raja and Baskar. However, Raja fights off the police and runs away to find his friend Shiva. Shiva tells him that the last location of Ranguski's phone was at a church in Cheyur. Raja visits the church and meets Maria's twin sister Mary, who reveals that Ranguski is the one who committed all the murders and framed Raja.

Meanwhile, Ranguski, in possession of the Gutenberg Bible, meets the buyers, the contact she got from John before killing him. While trying to escape with the money, she is shot by the police and dies in Raja's arms. Before dying, she reveals to Raja that she never loved him and that she used him as a pawn to conceal her crimes.

== Cast ==
- Metro Shirish as Raja
- Chandini Tamilarasan as Ranguski aka Regina William
- Anupama Kumar as Maria and Mary
- Kalloori Vinoth as Baskar
- Jayakumar as KK
- Vijay Sathya as Arokkiyam
- Madhu Raghuram as Photographer
- Sayee Sekar as John
- Ravichandran as Perumal
- Gopi GPR as KK's assistant
- Vijay Senathipathi as Raja Raam
- DuraiPandi as Kumar
- Deva as Siva
- Jindha Gopi as Antique Shop Owner
- Vijay Pranav as Commissioner

== Production ==
Dharani Dharan and Shirish, who made his acting debut with Metro (2016), announced that they would make a film together during September 2016. The following month, Yuvan Shankar Raja was signed on to work as the music composer, a move which raised the profile of the project. In late December 2016, Pooja Devariya was signed on to portray the lead female role, while the title was revealed to be Raja Ranguski, with the end of the name taken from writer Sujatha's pen name and the mosquito's name from Enthiran (2010). Production began during the first week of January, with the team suggesting that they would shoot for two straight months to wrap up filming work. A few days after the shoot began, Devariya was replaced by Chandini Tamilarasan after the former fell ill. The team were not able to delay the shoot and subsequently opted to sign on a new actress to keep to their schedule.

== Music ==
Raja Ranguski

Soundtrack album by Yuvan Shankar Raja
- Released: 2018
- Genre: Soundtrack
- Length: 13:18
- Language: Tamil
- Label: Think Music
- Producer: Yuvan Shankar Raja

Yuvan Shankar Raja chronology
Pyaar Prema Kaadhal (2018)	Raja Ranguski (2018)	Sandakozhi 2 (2018)

The soundtrack was composed by Yuvan Shankar Raja.

Track list
No.	Title	Lyrics	Singer(s)	Length
1.	"Gift of Life"	Mohan Rajan	Faridha	2:10
2.	"Kaadhal Gaana"	Mohan Rajan	V. M. Mahalingam	3:44
3.	"Mr. X"	Mohan Rajan	Silambarasan	2:45
4.	"Pattukutty Neethan"	Kabilan	Yuvan Shankar Raja	3:18
5.	"Shadow Theme"		Yuvan Shankar Raja	1:21
Total length:				13:18

== Reception ==
The Times of India gave 2.5/5 stars and wrote, "Despite the hastily written scenes that set up the romance between Raja and Ranguski, Dharanidharan manages to give us a fairly gripping murder mystery in the first half of Raja Ranguski." Ashameera Aiyappan of The New Indian Express wrote, "Unintentionally, there are several instances in Raja Ranguski where the characters on the screen ask the sort of questions I wanted to ask them myself." Srinivasa Ramanujam of The Hindu wrote, "This is a film that tries to travel in the lines of the recent gripping thrillers in Kollywood, but is let down by poor acting and commercial compromises." Anupama Subramanian of Deccan Chronicle praised the performances, background score, visuals, and first half, but criticized the screenplay and second half.
