= Jackson Durai =

2016 Indian film by Dharani Dharan

- Theatrical release poster
- Directed by: Dharani Dharan
- Written by: Dharani Dharan
- Produced by: M. S. Sharavanan
- Starring: Sathyaraj; Sibiraj; Bindu Madhavi
- Cinematography: Yuvraj
- Edited by: Vivek Harshan
- Music by: Original songs: Siddharth Vipin; Background Score; S. Chinna
- Production company: Sri Green Productions
- Distributed by: Sri Thenandal Films
- Release date: July 1, 2016
- Running time: 133 minutes
- Country: India
- Language: Tamil

Jackson Durai (transl. Lord Jackson) is a 2016 Indian Tamil-language comedy horror film based on the theme of the classic goth story, The Legend of Sleepy Hollow. The movie is written and directed by Dharani Dharan, starring Sathyaraj, Sibiraj, and Bindu Madhavi in the leading roles, while Karunakaran, Rajendran, and Yogi Babu play supporting roles. Featuring music composed by Siddharth Vipin and editing by Vivek Harshan, the film released on 1 July 2016.

== Plot ==
Sub-Inspector Sathya is sent to Aynpuram, a village in which a large bungalow from British times is claimed to be haunted by a ghost called Jackson according to the villagers. Sathya's mission is to prove that there are no ghosts in the village. Will he succeed in proving it or not forms the rest of the story.

== Cast ==
- Sathyaraj as Durai (Duraipandi Thevar)
- Sibiraj as Sub-Inspector Sathya
- Bindu Madhavi as Viji
- Karunakaran as Veera
- Rajendran as Bradlee (Suruli mani)
- Yogi Babu as Mani
- Zachary Coffin as Jackson
- Anchal Singh as Amy Jackson
- Mahanadi Shankar
- Shanmugasundaram
- Neha Menon as Durai's Sister
- Shan
- TSR
- Vijay Senathipathi

== Production ==
Sri Green Productions agreed to finance Dharani Dharan's second directorial venture after Burma (2014), and signed on actors Sibiraj and Bindu Madhavi to appear in a horror film. The film began production in May 2015, and was described to be a thriller set in the 1940s with Sathyaraj, Rajendran and American actor Zachary signed on for pivotal roles. Dharani Dharan revealed that the film would be completed by October 2015, at a cost of ₹3 crore (US$310,000).

== Soundtrack ==
Soundtrack was composed by Siddharth Vipin and lyrics written by Dharani Dharan, Aravind Devaraj and .

Track listing
No.	Title	Lyrics	Singer(s)	Length
1.	"Motorbike"	Dharani Dharan, Arvind Devaraj	Anthony Daasan
2.	"Jackson Durai"	Dharani Dharan, Arvind Devaraj	Gana Bala
3.	"Yethetho"	Mohan Rajan	Chinmayi, Karthik

== Critical reception ==
Baradwaj Rangan wrote for The Hindu, "Jackson Durai only sounds like a horror comedy — the plot is more intricate, it wants to do more than just make you laugh, scream. It actually wants to tell some kind of story, a Groundhog Day-like story that keeps looping back on itself, each iteration the opportunity for a change." Sify wrote, "Dharani Dharan’s ideology of mixing fantasy, horror and spoof is laudable but he hasn’t got the right screenplay. Although all the actors are capable of pulling off the characters given to them, the aimless screenplay doesn’t offer big entertainment." M. Suganth of The Times of India wrote, "The film is a horror comedy, a genre that is very much the trend today, and going by the director's previous film, you expect at least a competently made film that keeps us entertained. But the only thing that we have in store is disappointment." Top10cinema wrote "Definitely, a different horror tale, but lacks engagement."

== Sequel ==
A sequel to Jackson Durai, titled Jackson Durai: The Second Chapter, was announced in February 2023. The film is directed by Dharani Dharan and again stars Sathyaraj and Sibiraj. It is a horror thriller set in two timelines, one in the present and the other in the 1940s. The film entered its final schedule of shoot in June 2023.
