= Ramesh Cheppala =

Indian Telugu film director

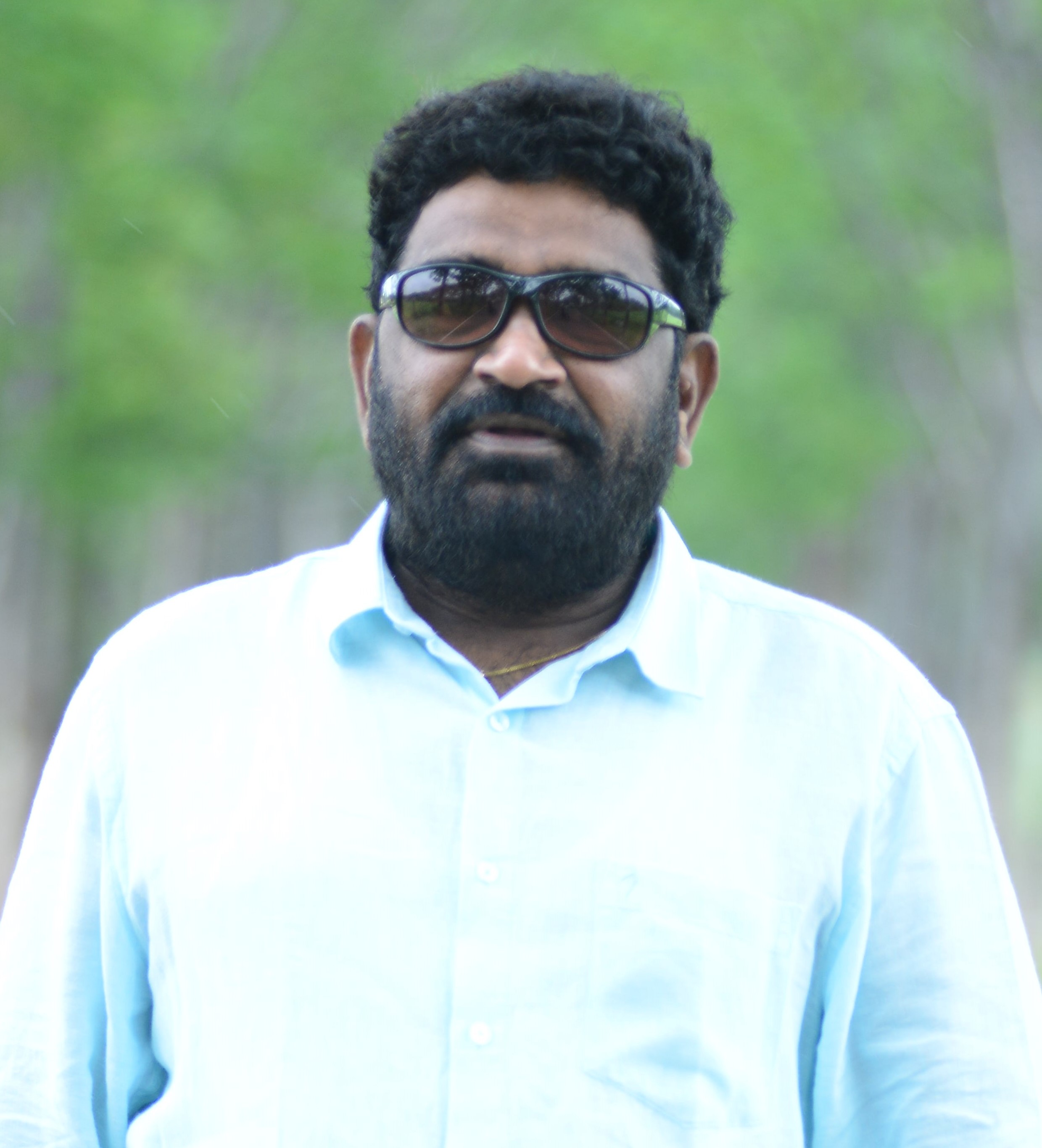
- Born: Kanaparthi, Veenavanka Mandal, Karimnagar district, Telangana, India
- Occupations: Writer; Director
- Years active: 2007 – present

Ramesh Cheppala is an Indian film director and writer from Telangana who works in Telugu cinema.

== Career ==
Ramesh Cheppala started his career as a dialogue writer for the film Mee Sreyobhilashi for which he won nine awards. In 2008, he made his directorial debut with the film Bewars starring Rajendra Prasad. In 2023, his second directed film Bheemadevarapally Branchi was released. His latest directorial, Laggam, was released in 2024 He is also an author and wrote the book Ma Kanaparthi Mushaira (2021), which was launched by V. Vijayendra Prasad.

== Filmography ==
Year	Movie	Director	Writer	Notes	Ref.
2007	Mee Sreyobhilashi	No	Dialogues		
2018	Bewars	Yes	Yes		
2023	Bheemadevarapally Branchi	Yes	Yes		
2024	Laggam	Yes	Yes		

=== Bibliography ===
- Ma Kanaparthi Mushaira (2021)
- Bombay doll (2022)
- Kathala Manduva (2024)
