= Shikhamani =

- Theatrical release poster
- ശിഖാമണി
- Directed by: Vinod Guruvayoor
- Screenplay by: Vinod Guruvayoor
- Produced by: K.K. Rajagopal
- Starring: Chemban Vinod Jose; Mrudula Murali; J.D. Chakravarthy; Mukesh
- Cinematography: Manoj Pillai
- Edited by: Sanal
- Music by: Songs: Sudeep Palanad; Background Score: Bijibal; Trailer Score: Aby Tom Cyriac
- Production company: Sreeraj Cinema
- Release date: 29 March 2016
- Running time: 132 minutes
- Country: India
- Language: Malayalam

Shikhamani is 2016 Indian Malayalam-language drama thriller film produced by K.K. Rajagopal under the banner of Sreeraj Cinema and directed by Vinod Guruvayoor. The film stars Chemban Vinod Jose, Mrudula Murali and J.D. Chakravarthy in the lead roles. The film was released on 29 March 2016.

== Plot ==
Shikhamani is an efficient railway gang-man who serves at the station which lies close to the Korangini forests. He knows each and every corner of the forest and helps the railways by clearing the obstacles that falls on the railway tracks that runs through the thick forests. Unexpectedly, a girl named Devika Raghavendra, a wanted terrorist gets injured and trapped in the Korangini forest. When Shikhamani finds her on the railtrack during his regular patrolling, she opens up before him. Eventually, he joins her side and tries to save her from the forest.

== Cast ==
- Chemban Vinod Jose as Shikhamani
- Mrudula Murali as Devika Raghavendra
- J.D. Chakravarthy as Anti-terrorist squad leader
- Sai Kumar as SI P.K. Ashok
- Mukesh as Acp Raveendranath
- Sudheer Karamana as Vaidyar Murugesan
- Pradeep Kottayam
- Noby Marcose
- Shaju
- Sunil Sukhada
- Balaji Sarma
- Anjana Appukkuttan
- Chinnu Kuruvila

== Music ==
Debutant Sudeep Palanad composed the soundtrack album for the film with lyrics written by Shibu Chakravarthy. The audio was released on 30 March 2016, on the label of Satyam Audios.

| No. | Title | Singer(s) | Length |
|---|---|---|---|
| 1. | "Churam Irangana" | Sudeep Palanad | 1:54 |
| 2. | "Kizhakkan Malayude" | P. Jayachandran | 4:06 |
| 3. | "Nilaa Vaanile" | Vijay Yesudas, Swetha Mohan | 4:11 |
| 4. | "Nilaa Vaanile (Remix)" | Swetha Mohan | 4:41 |
| Total length: | | | 14:52 |

== Critical reception ==
Veeyen for nowrunning.com commented, "Granted that the film talks of social issues that make criminals out of innocent young men and women, and the aftermath of an economic imbalance that without doubt prevails. But Shikhamani is a bummer of a film that leaves a series of disappointments in its wake".
