= Pragya Nagra =

Indian actress and model

- Born: 14 December 1998 (age 27); Ambala, Haryana, India
- Occupation: Actress
- Years active: 2019–present

Pragya Nagra (born 14 December 1998) is an Indian actress known for her appearances in Tamil and Malayalam language films. She made her debut in the Tamil film Varalaru Mukkiyam

== Personal life ==
Nagra's father served in the Indian Armed Forces and was posted in Chennai for a period, which led to her frequent visits to the city. While pursuing her engineering studies in Delhi, she developed an interest in modelling and went on to feature in over 100 commercials. Nagra was also a member of the National Cadet Corps (NCC) during her studies, and aspired to join the armed forces. However, she eventually decided to pursue a career in the film industry and moved to Chennai.

== Career ==
Pragya Nagra played the role of a Malayali girl opposite Jiiva in the Tamil Film Varalaru Mukkiyam, which was released in 2022. Although the film received negative reviews from both critics and the audience, Nagra's acting skills was noted by the industry now she is in tollywood may be in future she is in Bollywood movies also

She appeared in the Malayalam film Nadikalil Sundari Yamuna, a socio-political drama in which she played the role of a Kannada girl. Prior to her acting career, Nagra worked as a model and appeared in commercials. Her passion for acting developed during her frequent visits to Chennai, and she eventually decided to move to the film industry.

== Filmography ==
Year	Title	Role	Language	Ref
2022	Varalaru Mukkiyam	Jamuna	Tamil	
2023	N4	Swathi	Tamil	
2023	Nadhikalil Sundari Yamuna	Yamuna	Malayalam	
2024	Laggam	Maanasa	Telugu	
2025	Baby and Baby	Priya	Tamil	
2026	Idhayam Murali		Tamil	
