= Baby and Baby =

2025 Indian Tamil film by Prathap

- Theatrical release poster
- Directed by: Prathap
- Written by: Prathap
- Produced by: B. Yuvaraj
- Starring: Jai; Yogi Babu; Sathyaraj; Pragya Nagra; Sai Dhanyaa
- Cinematography: T. P. Sarathy
- Edited by: K. Anandhalingakumar
- Music by: D. Imman
- Production company: Yuvaraj Films
- Release date: 14 February 2025
- Running time: 133 minutes
- Country: India
- Language: Tamil

Baby and Baby is a 2025 Indian Tamil-language comedy drama film written and directed by Prathap and produced by B. Yuvaraj under his Yuvaraj Films banner. The film stars Jai, Yogi Babu, Sathyaraj, Pragya Nagra and Sai Dhanyaa in the lead roles. It is the modern day take on Enakkoru Magan Pirappan (1996)

Baby and Baby released in theatres on 14 February 2025. The film received negative reviews from critics.

== Plot ==
Two families that uphold traditional and conservative values expect the arrival of a newborn. Little do they know that a weird mix-up would make the lives of the babies’ parents terrible in one way or the other.

The baby boy of one family being announced as the sole heir to its valuable assets makes things further complicated. This leaves a couple of cunning and greedy family members dejected. They plan a crime to stop the baby from becoming the heir to their wealth. What happens next forms the rest of the story?

== Cast ==
- Jai as Shiva
- Yogi Babu as Guna
- Sathyaraj as Mahalingam
- Keerthana as Mahalingam's wife
- Pragya Nagra as Priya
- Sai Dhanyaa as Malar
- Anandaraj as Rajan
- Nizhalgal Ravi as Dayalan
- Ilavarasu as Muthaiya
- Sriman as Manikkam
- Singampuli as Singampuli
- Rajendran as Thokkudurai
- Redin Kingsley as Inspector Kuzhanthaivelu
- RJ Vigneshkanth as Shiva's friend
- KPY Ramar as "Quarter" Kumar
- Thangadurai as Thangadurai, Thokkudurai's accolyte
- Lollu Sabha Seshu as Guna's uncle
- Prathosham
- Kalki Raja as Thokkudurai's accolyte
- Nellai Mani
- Aarthi as Airport passenger
- Papri Ghosh as Manikkam's wife
- Baby Harshith and Baby Shayan as the swapped babies

Uncredited

- Kannappa Dasan as Joshiyar

== Music ==
Baby and Baby

Soundtrack album by D. Imman
- Released: 7 February 2025
- Studios: D. Imman’s Sound Factory (Audio Suite A and B), Chennai
- Genre: Feature film soundtrack
- Length: 33:31
- Language: Tamil
- Label: DI Sound Factory
- Producer: D. Imman

D. Imman chronology
Petta Rap (2024)	Baby and Baby (2025)	2K Love Story (2025)

External audio
- Baby & Baby (Jukebox) on YouTube

The soundtrack and background is composed by D. Imman.

All lyrics are written by Yugabharathi.

Track listing
No.	Title	Singer(s)	Length
1.	"Aaraa Amuthey"	Saindhavi	4:25
2.	"Thenpaandi Muthupola"	Diwakar, Meenakshi Elayaraja	4:22
3.	"Yenna Thavam Seitheno"	Harish Raghavendra, Shweta Mohan	4:20
4.	"Kingini Kingini"	Narayanan Ravishankar	4:03

Background theme
No.	Title	Length
1.	"Off to Dubai"
2.	"Love on the Way"
3.	"Where is the Baby"
4.	"Dodge Challenger"
5.	"Festival of Joy"
6.	"Middle East"
7.	"Gameplay"
8.	"Baby Snatcher"
9.	"Classical"
10.	"Dubai Sheikh"
11.	"Love Proposal"
12.	"Misplaced"
13.	"Field Trip"
14.	"Understanding Life"
15.	"Hero in Rescue"
16.	"The Hunter"
17.	"Family Unity"

== Reception ==
Abhinav Subramanian of The Times of India gave 2/5 stars and wrote "In attempting to blend family drama with comedy, Baby & Baby delivers neither, resulting in a film that feels less like a modern family entertainer and more like a relic from a bygone era." Thinkal Menon of The South First gave 2/5 stars and wrote "Baby and Baby relies on the same old formula with a stellar cast, but fails to deliver because of the lack of depth in characters and outdated treatment." Narayani M of Cinema Express gave 1.5/5 stars and wrote "However, in its pursuit to create back-to-back laughs, many one-liners and stretches in Baby and Baby are either thrust forcefully or tumble off into oblivion." Gopinath Rajendran of The Hindu wrote "[...] Baby and Baby sways between mass and humour territory. A film as clichéd as this deserves a clichéd critique and that would be to call it old wine in an old bottle."
