= Venigalla Rambabu =

Indian poet, lyricist, radio-personality

- Education: Osmania University
- Occupations: Poet, lyricist, composer
- Title: Dr.

Venigalla Rambabu is an Indian poet, lyricist, radio-personality, Avadhani (literary performer), and columnist known for his works in Telugu cinema, Telugu theatre, Telugu literature, Radio and Television.

== Career ==
Rambabu holds MA-MPhil-PhD in Telugu literature from Osmania University. In 2007, he received Nandi Award for Best Lyricist for his work in the film Mee Sreyobhilashi.

== Selected filmography ==
- Ninne Premistha - 2000
- Simharasi - 2001
- Mee Sreyobhilashi - 2007
- Manorama - 2009
- Devaraya - 2012
- Ee Manase - 2014
- Red Alert - 2015
- Raja Cheyyi Vesthe - 2016
- O Malli - 2016

== Awards ==
Nandi Awards

- Best Lyricist - Mee Sreyobhilashi - 2007

Other Awards

- Bharathamuni Award
