= Phone snatching =

Theft of mobile phones from pedestrians

Phone snatching is a form of robbery in a which a thief will steal a mobile phone directly from the hand of a pedestrian and immediately flee, typically on an electric scooter or bike.

== Method ==
In a phone snatching, the thief, typically traveling on an electric scooter or bike, will target potential victims who are distracted by their phones in a public area. These thieves often use public-use bikes and scooters and wear hoods to make it difficult for witnesses to identify them. While riding on the sidewalk or close to the curb, the thief will grab the victim's phone as they pass by and quickly speed away. The victim will often give chase on foot, but fail to catch up with the thief.

== Statistics ==
Phone snatching is especially prevalent in London, particularly in central boroughs such as Westminster, Lambeth, and Newham. The Metropolitan Police reported 80,000 such thefts in 2024.

Thieves have been known to discard stolen phones if they are damaged, outdated, or an undesirable model. Research has suggested that iPhones are four times more likely to be targeted for theft than Androids.

Approximately three-quarters of stolen phones are sold overseas, with many ending up on the Chinese black market.

== Notable incidents ==
In 2024, a 28-year-old man was arrested in London after stealing twenty-four mobile phones from pedestrians in a single morning as he raced past them on a motorbike.

== Responses ==
The Metropolitan Police have employed camera-equipped motorbikes in an effort to combat phone snatchers.

== See also ==
- Pickpocketing
- Scam
- Snatch theft
