= Pavithra Jayaram =

Indian actress

- Pavithra Jayaram
- Born: April 20, 1971; Bangalore, Karnataka, India
- Died: May 12, 2024 (aged 53); Divitipally, Mahbubnagar, Telangana, India
- Occupation: Actress
- Children: 2

Pavithra Jayaram (20 April 1971 – 12 May 2024) was an actress from Karnataka who acted in Kannada and Telugu serials and made a name for herself in the Kannada television industry. She died in a car accident on 12 May 2024 at Divitipally in the Mahbubnagar district. She was travelling with her husband from Bangalore to Hyderabad.

== Early life ==
Jayaram was born in Bangalore. In 2021, she married Chandrakanth, actor. It was her second marriage. She has a son, Chandan Kumar, and a daughter, Prathiksha.

== Career ==
Jayaram made her debut in the TV industry with a Kannada serial, Jokali in 2018. Later in 2018, she also entered the Telugu scene with another popular serial, Ninne Pelladatha. Then she starred in another serial Tilottama and in a few years, she became well known for her roles in both Karnataka and Andhra Pradesh. She also acted in Robot Family, Galipata, TrinayaniI, Neeli and Radha Ramana. She also acted in Kannada films Melobba Mayavi and Manjari, and in a Telugu movie BucchiNaidu Kandriga.

== Death ==
Jayaram was travelling in a car along with her husband Chandrakanth, cousin Apeksha and driver Srikanth, from Bangalore to Hyderabad. Police said that the driver lost control and hit the divider and crashed into a bus. The accident happened at Divitipally in Mahbubnagar district of Telangana state. Her husband, Chandrakanth, committed suicide three days after her death on 15 May 2024.
