= Mee Sreyobhilashi =

- Movie Poster
- Directed by: V. Eshwar Reddy
- Written by: V. Eshwar Reddy
- Dialogue by: Ramesh Cheppala
- Produced by: Y. Sonia Reddy
- Starring: Rajendra Prasad; Naresh
- Cinematography: K. Ravindra Babu
- Edited by: Marthand K. Venkatesh
- Music by: Koti
- Production company: VISU Films Pvt Ltd
- Release date: 28 December 2007
- Running time: 128 mins
- Country: India
- Language: Telugu

Mee Sreyobhilashi (transl. Your well-wisher) is a 2007 Indian Telugu-language philosophical film directed by V. Eshwar Reddy and starring Rajendra Prasad, Naresh and music composed by Koti. Upon release, the film received highly positive reviews and remained a box office hit. The film won two Nandi Awards and was premiered in the Indian panorama section at the International Film Festival of India. The movie was remade in Kannada as Lift Kodla (2010). The core plot of the movie was reportedly inspired from the 1998 Japanese film Ikinai.

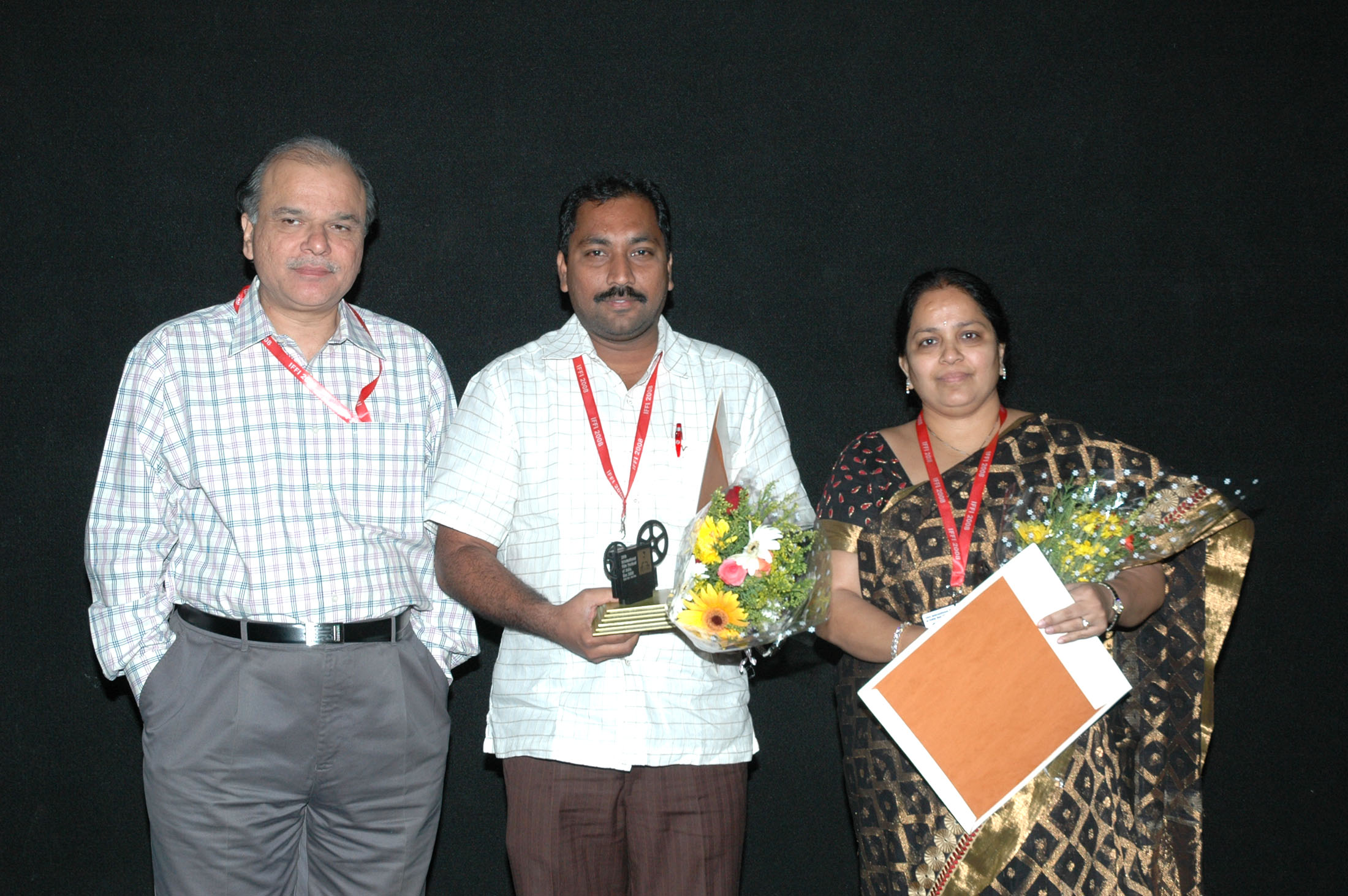
Director Sonia Reddy (right) at IFFI (2008)

== Cast ==
- Rajendra Prasad as Rajaji
- Naresh as Surya Prakash Reddy
- Nasser as ACP Sunil
- Brahmanandam as Swamiji
- Ali as Watchman Ali
- Tanikella Bharani as Hotel Owner
- Chalapathi Rao as Minister
- Krishna Bhagawan as Chitila Chinna Rao
- Raghu Babu as Mallesh
- Chinna as Rama Krishna
- Raavi Kondala Rao as Raghuram
- Ravi Varma Adduri as Vinod
- Jai Dhanush as Kiran
- Srinivas Reddy as Koyadora
- Ram Jagan as Constable
- Kadambari Kiran as Constable
- Chitram Srinu
- Gundu Hanumantha Rao as Watchman
- Visweswara Rao as Beggar
- Radha Kumari as Lakshmi
- Meena as Amala
- Medha as Swapna
- Shilpa Chakravarthy as Anchor Sirisha
- Roopa Kaur as Sandhya
- Sruthi as Mallesh's wife
- Master Suraj as Chandu

== Soundtrack ==
Mee Sreyobhilashi

Film score by Koti
- Released: 2007
- Genre: Soundtrack
- Length: 9:30
- Label: Madhura Audio
- Producer: Koti

Koti chronology
Classmates (2007)	Mee Sreyobhilashi (2007)	Podarillu (2007)

Music composed by Koti. Music released on MADHURA Audio Company.

No.	Title	Lyrics	Singer(s)	Length
1.	"Chirunavvulatho Brathakali"	Venigalla Rambabu	S. P. Balasubrahmanyam	9:30
Total length:				9:30

== Awards ==
Nandi Awards - 2007

- Best Feature Film - Gold - V. Easwar Reddy
- Best Dailouge writer - Ramesh Cheppala.
- Best Lyricist - Venegella Rambabu
