= Chikkiku Chikkikkichu =

2015 Indian film by N Rajesh Kumar

- Official poster
- Directed by: N Rajesh Kumar
- Written by: N Rajesh Kumar
- Produced by: K. Balasubramanian
- Starring: Mithun Maheshwaran; Mrudula Murali
- Cinematography: N. S. Rajesh Kumar
- Edited by: A. Kevin
- Music by: Vijay Benjamin
- Production company: NCR Movie Creations
- Distributed by: Studio 9 Productions
- Release date: 30 October 2015
- Country: India
- Language: Tamil

Chikkiku Chikkikkichu (transl. Caught in a trap) is a 2015 Indian Tamil-language romantic comedy film directed by N Rajesh Kumar and starring Mithun and Mrudula Murali. The film takes place on a train from Chennai to Nagercoil.

== Cast ==
- Mithun as Chikki a.k.a. Chidambara Krishnan
- Mrudula Murali as Varsha
- Aadhavan as Venky
- Anup Arvind
- Anjali Devi
- Afzal
- S. Guru
- Ashwin
- Telephone Karunanidhi
- Arun
- Vishal Vijay
- Narayanan
- Swaminathan
- Sona
- Seetha

== Soundtrack ==
The music by Vijay Benjamin features a song sung by T. Rajender.

== Reception ==
Malini Mannath of The New Indian Express opined that "But at times it does look like the debutant maker had attempted to stretch what should have been a short film, to an unmanageable length". Anupama Subramanian of Deccan Chronicle wrote that "The director should be commended for steer clearing from sleazy scenes despite the film being a romantic tale that takes place in one night journey. The problem with the movie is that it just revolves around the lead two characters most part of it".
