= Varalaru Mukkiyam =

2022 Indian film by Santhosh Rajan

- Theatrical release poster
- Directed by: Santhosh Rajan
- Written by: Santhosh Rajan
- Produced by: R. B. Choudary
- Starring: Jiiva; Kashmira Pardeshi; Pragya Nagra
- Cinematography: Sakthi Saravanan
- Edited by: N. B. Srikanth
- Music by: Shaan Rahman
- Production company: Super Good Films
- Release date: 9 December 2022
- Country: India
- Language: Tamil

Varalaru Mukkiyam (transl. History is important) is a 2022 Indian Tamil-language romantic comedy drama film written and directed by Santhosh Rajan in his directorial debut and produced by R. B. Choudary through the company Super Good Films. The film stars his son Jiiva, Kashmira Pardeshi and Pragya Nagra in lead roles. The film's music and score were composed by Shaan Rahman with cinematography handled by Sakthi Saravanan and editing done by N. B. Srikanth.

The film was shot extensively across Tamil Nadu including Chennai and Coimbatore, Hyderabad and Telangana and the final schedule was filmed in Kerala. The film was released in theatres on 9 December 2022.

== Plot ==
Film starts in 2050 where ex politician Adaikalam encounters a lot of prostitutes and a man called Chris Gayle. Adaikalam revealed he was going to be the future MLA until his friend, whom he considers a younger brother to him, called Karthik has ruined his life.

In Coimbatore 2022, Karthik a.k.a Karthi is an unemployed carefree man which no one in his neighbourhood knows what he does throughout the day. Karthi aids Adaikalam for his upcoming politics and Adaikalam said he was going to make sex education mandatory to learn in school because they witnessed how much the youth knows nothing about this. Meanwhile, Karthi meets Jamuna, a Malayali girl whose family has moved in. They both take a liking for each other. Jamuna's father Velayudhan Kutty, wants his daughter to marry a man who is working in Dubai. Velayudhan Kutty has gathered information from Jamuna that few people from the neighbourhood has bachelors who are in their 20s, which he has taken into account and Jamuna emphasises on the door number 58 (where Karthi and his family live). Velayudhan Kutty's wife noticed that so many men has gathered outside their house, which he explained that so many Tamil men has a fetishism towards Malayalee women. When Karthi asked all the other men to leave, he saw Jamuna outside from her balcony but he ends up falling in love with her older sister Yamuna, therefore lost interest to Jamuna.

Karthi could not decide which sister he wanted, so he tried to woo Yamuna while also keeping a distance from Jamuna who is actively pursuing him. Karthi confessed his love to Yamuna but she said she would tell her father. Adaikalam advise to Karthi that he should keep Jamuna in mind, just in case Yamuna rejects him. Karthi gave Yamuna two days for her to respond to his proposal while lying to Jamuna that he is in love with her.

When Yamuna ignores him and Karthi tries to talk to her, Jamuna ends up realising that Karthi was in love with her sister this whole time. Yamuna realised she started to fall in love with Karthi but tries to show that she is not interested. She finally confessed her love to him. Meanwhile, when Velayudhan Kutty, his wife and Jamuna went to Palakkad for the weekend, leaving both Yamuna and her grandmother, Yamuna invited Karthi home. Karthi wanted to spend the evening with her by getting to know her, but Adaikalam said that Yamuna's intention was to have sex with him and gave him a condom, which Karthi reluctantly takes.

The next day, Adaikalam thinks the night became successful, but Karthi explained that she wanted to show her family album to him. Karthi also realised that the condom was last seen at her house, and he needs to find a way to retrieve it, but Yamuna found the condom and broke up with him because she thinks he is using her for sex. Karthi tries to make it up which Adaikalam suggested that they should kidnap her grandmother so that he can actually convince her his side of the story. While this occurred, Adaikalam takes full responsibility and told her not to blame Karthi because he genuinely loves her, yet Yamuna ignores him. Later on, Yamuna and Karthi made up. They continued on their relationship until when Velayudhan Kutty finds out. He starts to find marriage proposals for both sisters.

Karthi ends up finding out that Yamuna is getting engaged to a man from Dubai and stood outside of her house. Velayudhan Kutty asked the other men to send him off, which a fight ensures. Karthi then proves a point to Velayudhan Kutty that Yamuna is in love with him more than her fiancée. The next day, the whole neighbourhood is talking about Karthi and Yamuna's relationship, which Karthi's father Gopal begs him to break up with Yamuna because this would save their reputation and for the sake of his younger sister Kavitha, in case of a future marriage prospect for her. Karthi ends up begging for an apology to Velayudhan Kutty which he accepts. He even promised to stay away from a while until Yamuna's wedding is over. One night, he witnessed a couple eloping which they have been caught by the girl's family members. While the girl asked Karthi to save her, he told her that she should listen to her family because it is their happiness what matters, until when one of the relatives said Dubai which triggered Karthi and he fights them. Adaikalam disliked the fact that Karthi and Yamuna are not together so he tries to kidnap both Yamuna and Karthi on her reception day so they can get married. The night of her reception, Karthi did not go but Gopal felt bad and asked him to have fun with his friends instead of being sad.

It is revealed that Karthi was going to kidnap Yamuna from her reception night so they can elope and he puts on a façade to his parents and Velayudhan Kutty that he is ready to move on from Yamuna. Adaikalam was shocked to realise this but Karthi escaped. One of the disguises was Karthi dressing up as a woman. Adaikalam asked for a destress medicine which he instead had a viagra, hence when he saw Karthi dressing up as a woman, he became attracted to her. Gopal realised that Karthi was planning to elope with Yamuna and Velayudhan Kutty comes to find out as well. While Karthi manages to escape from Adaikalam, he comes to realise that Yamuna's fiancée is also a pervert. Karthi ends up finding Yamuna and they talk about their plan for tomorrow, which her family came in. Yamuna lied that the female attire Karthi is her chemistry teacher and her mother suggested for the 'teacher' to be Yamuna's roommate, which Jamuna also insists of joining. However, in the middle of the night, the mother realised that it was Karthi because the wig has fallen off. This led to a conflict within the families.

Back to 2050, Chris Gayle asked Adaikalam how did Karthi ruined his life which he revealed that Karthi exposed his sex tape, therefore he was removed as a politician. Adaikalam returned to the carehome and see the much older Karthi. Karthi revealed that he is married to Yamuna and has two useless children. He also reveals that he keeps in contact with Jamuna who is married and moved to Dubai.

== Cast ==
- Jiiva as Karthik Gopal
- Kashmira Pardeshi as Yamuna (Voice dubbed by Raveena Ravi)
- Pragya Nagra as Jamuna
- VTV Ganesh as Adaikalam
- K. S. Ravikumar as Gopal, Karthik's father
- Motta Rajendran as Chris Gayle
- Siddique as Velayudhan Kutty, Yamuna and Jamuna's father
- Viji Ratheesh as Parvathy Kutty, Yamuna and Jamuna's mother
- Saranya Ponvannan as Malar, Karthik's mother
- Shah Ra as Karthik's friend
- TSK as Raman
- E. Ramdoss as Karthik's grandfather
- Swaminathan
- Lollu Sabha Manohar
- Kali Rajkumar as Karthik's friend
- Aadhirai Soundarajan as Kavitha, Karthi's sister

== Production ==
The film was tentatively titled Jiiva37. On 4 January 2022, the film's official title was unveiled as Varalaru Mukkiyam. Post-production of the film worked in progress on 4 January 2022.

== Music ==
Varalaru Mukkiyam

Soundtrack album by Shaan Rahman
- Released: 10 June 2022
- Recorded: 2022
- Genre: Feature film soundtrack
- Language: Tamil
- Label: Saregama
- Producer: Shaan Rahman

Shaan Rahman chronology
Roop Nagar Ke Cheetey (2022)	Varalaru Mukkiyam (2022)	Aanandam Paramanandam (2022)

Singles from Varalaru Mukkiyam
- 1. "Pothi Pothi Valatha Pulla" Released: 10 June 2022; 2. "Mallu Girl" Released: 8 July 2022; 3. "Vela Kedachiruchu" Released: 5 August 2022; 4. "Suthura Boomi" Released: 30 November 2022

Shaan Rahman composed the soundtrack and background score of the film while collaborating with actor Jiiva and director Santhosh Rajan for the first time. The audio rights were acquired by Saregama. The first single "Pothi Pothi Valatha Pulla" was released on 10 June 2022. The second single "Mallu Girl" was released on 8 July 2022. The third single "Vela Kedachiruchu" was released on 5 August 2022. The fourth single titled "Suthura Boomi" was released on 30 November 2022.

Track listing
No.	Title	Lyrics	Singer(s)	Length
1.	"Pothi Pothi Valatha Pulla"	Santhosh Rajan	Benny Dayal	4:05
2.	"Mallu Girl"	Madhan Karky	Shaan Rahman, Athira A. Nair	3:45
3.	"Vela Kedachiruchu"	Santhosh Rajan	Vineeth Sreenivasan	4:11
4.	"Suthura Boomi"	Santhosh Rajan	Gana Bala	1:53
Total length:				13:54

== Release ==
=== Theatrical ===
The film was released in theatres on 9 December 2022. Initially, it was scheduled for a release on 2 December 2022.

=== Home media ===
The film began streaming on Netflix from 15 January 2023.

== Reception ==
M. Suganth of The Times of India gave the film 1 out of 5 stars and wrote "You feel like telling [Jiiva], Varalaaru mukkiyam, but script selection adha vida mukkiyam" (transl. History is important, but script selection is more important than that"). Vignesh Madhu of Cinema Express gave the film 1.5 out of 5 stars and wrote "Varalaru Mukkiyam is a needless reminder of the times when senseless, absurd films were brandished as trendy comedies. A throwback to that era isn't that important a history to revisit". A critic for The Indian Express wrote that except for a few 18+ verses, it would have been a family-friendly film; overall, though there are some ups and downs, it's a decently entertaining movie that's fun to watch and history matters. Ashik A of Samayam wrote that although the story is already seen and used to, it has earned pass marks as an entertaining film that does not fight with comedy scenes. A critic from Dinamalar rated the film 2.5 out of 5 stars.
