= Laggam =

2024 Indian film by Ramesh Cheppala

- Theatrical release poster
- Directed by: Ramesh Cheppala
- Written by: Ramesh Cheppala
- Produced by: T. Venugopal Reddy
- Starring: Sai Ronak; Pragya Nagra; Rajendra Prasad; Rohini; L.B. Sriram; Raccha Ravi; Krishnudu
- Cinematography: P. Balreddy
- Edited by: Bonthala Nageswara Reddy
- Music by: Charan Arjun, Mani Sharma
- Production company: Subishi Entertainment
- Distributed by: Asian Suresh Entertainment
- Release date: 30 July 2024
- Country: India
- Language: Telugu

Laggam (transl. Marriage) is a 2024 Telugu-language emotional drama film directed by Ramesh Cheppala and produced by T. Venugopal Reddy under the banner of Subishi Entertainments. The film stars Sai Ronak, Rajendra Prasad, Pragya Nagra, Rohini, Vadlamani Srinivas, Raghu Babu, LB Sriram, Saptagiri, Krishnudu, and Raccha Ravi in key roles. The film explores traditional Telangana wedding culture, its values, and the emotional journey of the main characters.

== Plot ==
The story follows the dramatic journey of Chaitanya and Maanasa as they navigate the cultural ideologies and values of a traditional Telangana wedding. The film opens with rituals and traditions but soon takes unexpected twists, leading the characters and their families through an emotional rollercoaster.

== Cast ==
- Sai Ronak as Chaitanya
- Pragya Nagra as Maanasa
- Rajendra Prasad as Sadanandam, Maanasa’s father
- Rohini as Suguna, Chaitanya’s mother and Sadanandam’s sister
- Vadlamani Srinivas as Venkatesam, Chaitanya’s father
- Saptagiri as Sarpanch Vari
- LB Sriram as Ramayya alias Bapu, Sadanandam’s father-figure
- Raghu Babu as Dubai Tirupathi, Maanasa’s uncle
- Krishnudu as Ganesh, Chaitanya’s uncle
- Raccha Ravi as Barrelanna, Chaitanya’s friend
- Kancharapalem Raju as Seenu, Sadanandam’s friend
- Prabhavati Varma as Seenu’s wife
- Sandhya Gandham as Sarpanch’s wife
- Chammak Chandra as DJ Prakash
- Chitram Srinu as Prakash’s assistant
- Ravi Prakash as Ravi, Chaitanya’s boss
- Kireeti Damaraju as Shivaji, Ramayya’s son
- Prabhas Sreenu as Deloitte Diwakar
- Ravi Varma as Health Officer
- Manik Reddy as Marriage Bureau Manager
- Karampuri Vidyasagar as Relative

== Production ==
The production of Laggam was led by Ramesh Cheppala, who took on the roles of writer and director. The film is produced by T. Venugopal Reddy under the banner of Subishi Entertainments. The cinematography was handled by MN Balreddy. The editing process was overseen by Bonthala Nageswara Reddy, The background score, composed by Mani Sharma, while the music direction and lyrics handled by Charan Arjun. Choreography for the film's dance sequences was managed by Ajay Siva Sankar.

== Soundtrack ==
Laggam

Film score by Charan Arjun
- Released: 2024
- Studio: RushStudios; Jubilee 10 Studios
- Genre: Feature film soundtrack
- Length: 23:15
- Language: Telugu
- Label: Aditya Music

Charan Arjun chronology
Vimanam (2023)	Laggam (2024)
External audio
- Laggam – Jukebox on YouTube

The soundtrack of Laggam is composed by Charan Arjun, who also penned the lyrics for all the songs, where Mani Sharma issued the background score for the film.

Track listing
No.	Title	Lyrics	Singer(s)	Length
1.	"Laga Laaga Laggam"	Charan Arjun	Sri Krishna, Chinmayi Sripada, Shreenika Mahati	3:46
2.	"Undalene Ammi"	Charan Arjun	Yasaswi Kondepudi, Veeha	3:25
3.	"Inthenemo Inthenemo"	Charan Arjun	K.S. Chithra, Ravi G	4:16
4.	"Puttagane Pettaru Peru"	Charan Arjun	Charan Arjun, Shreenika Mahati	3:46
5.	"Elaagano"	Charan Arjun	Sahithi Chaganti	3:33
6.	"Mushayira"	Sanjay Mahesh	Nakash Aziz, Veeha	4:29
Total length:				23:15

== Release ==
=== Theatrical ===
Laggam was originally slated for a theatrical release on 18 October 2024, but the date was later shifted to 25 October 2024 which was announced by Sudheer Babu.

=== Home media ===
Laggam was officially scheduled to stream on Aha Video from 22 November 2024.
