= Kalloori Vinoth =

Indian actor

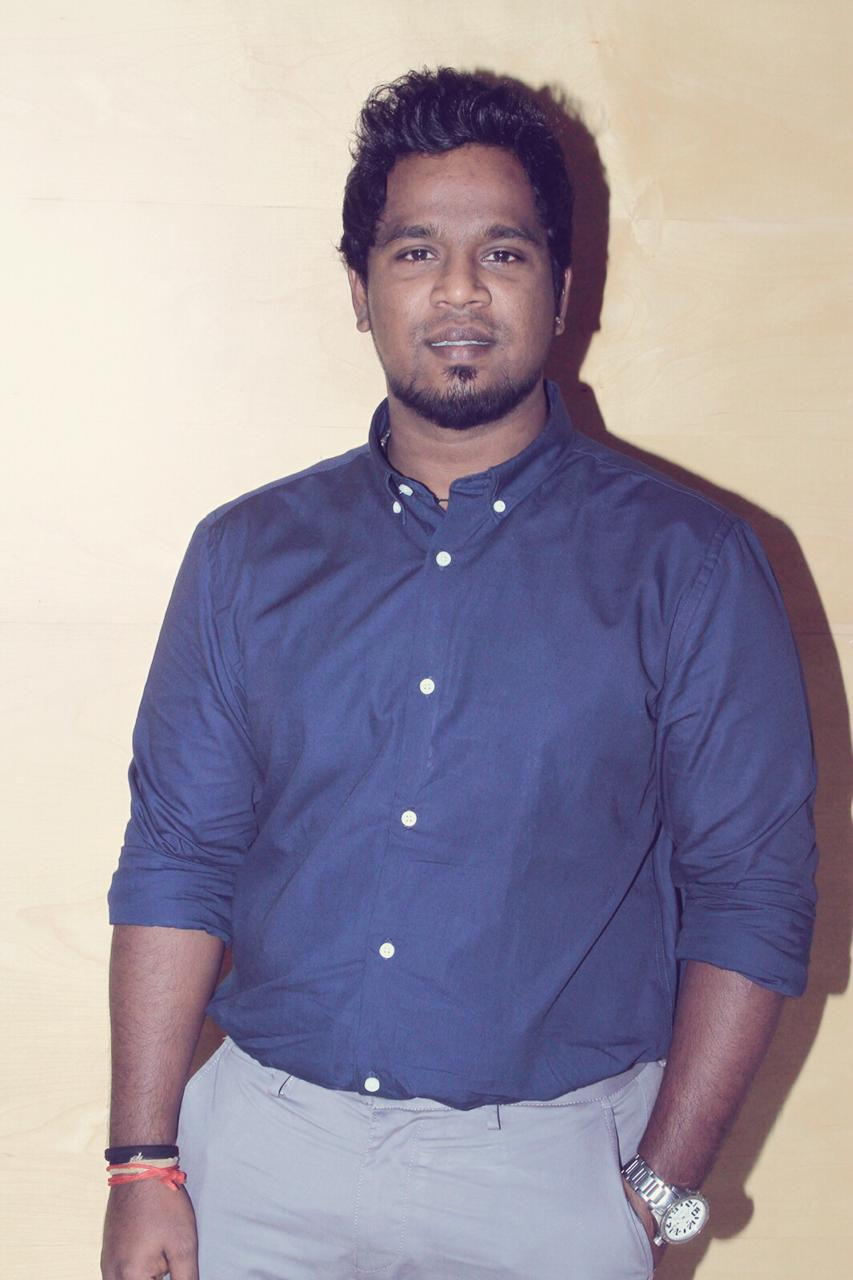
- Occupation: Actor
- Years active: 2007-present
- Notable work: Maari (2015)

Kalloori Vinoth is an Indian actor who has appeared in Tamil language films.

== Career ==
After making his debut in Kalloori (2007) and appearing in small roles in several films, he made his breakthrough as an actor with a supporting role in Balaji Mohan's Maari (2015). In 2018, Vinoth played a comedic role in Raja Ranguski, which garnered acclaim from critics. He reprised his role from Maari in the sequel titled Maari 2 along with Dhanush and Robo Shankar.

== Filmography ==
Year	Film	Role	Notes
2007	Kalloori	Iruvar	
2012	Kalakalappu	Pickpocket	
2013	Vizha	Pusa	
2013	Sundattam	Siluvai	
2015	Maari	Adithangi	
2017	Enakku Vaaitha Adimaigal	Sowmya Narayanan's friend	
2017	Pichuva Kaththi	Kamatchi	
2018	Sketch	Chitti	
2018	Raja Ranguski	Baskar	
2018	Maari 2	Adithangi	
2019	Ongala Podanum Sir	Shiv	
2019	Sangathamizhan	Muthu	
2020	Pizhai	Saravana	
2020	Trip	James	
2021	Papillon		
2021	Gaadi Ulla Body		
2021	Cindrella	Bob	
2022	Therkathi Veeran		
2023	Ayothi	Durai	
2023	Kidugu		
2023	Rayar Parambarai	Anwar	
2023	Lockdown Diarie		
2023	Ra Ra Sarasukku Ra Ra		
2024	Rebel	Paandi	
2024	Appu VI STD	Saba	
2025	Mask	Sub-Inspector Arul	

Web series

- Nisha (2019)
- Putham Pudhu Kaalai Vidiyaadhaa (2022)
- Accidental Farmer and Co (2023)
