= Unitel Straight Shooters =

Philippine film production company

Unitel Straight Shooters Media Inc.
- Formerly: Unitel Pictures (2001–2024)
- Type: Film production
- Industry: Motion pictures
- Founded: 2001
- Headquarters: Makati, Philippines
- Key people: Tony Gloria (Chairman); Maria Madonna Tarrayo (President and CEO); Bel dela Cruz (CFO); Grace Quisias (VP-Operations of Client Services and Production)
- Owner: MediaQuest Holdings
- Website: Unitel Straight Shooters

Unitel Straight Shooters or UXS, (formerly known as Unitel Pictures) is a Philippine independent film production company.

== History ==
The film company was established in 1988 by Tony Gloria as a line producer. In 2001, American Adobo, co-produced with Star Cinema, was its maiden movie.

Prior to establishing Unitel, Gloria served as supervising producer of Viva Films from its inception to 1987 and executive producer of Viva's subsidiary Falcon Films in 1988. In 1988, he left Viva and established his own film company Filmstar, known for releasing a slew of Joey de Leon's hit movies Elvis and James (1989) and Barbi for President (1991). In 1993, Filmstar closed and Gloria focused solely on TV commercials.

In 2003, Unitel began producing and distributing its own movies. Among its critically-acclaimed and award-winning movies are Crying Ladies, Santa Santita, La Visa Loca, Inang Yaya and Peque Gallaga's directorial comeback film Pinoy/Blonde.

In 2004, Imelda was banned from Philippine cinemas for 20 days, as requested by Imelda Marcos to the Makati Regional Trial Court. However, it was canceled after Unitel filed a petition to reverse the ban. Upon its release to cinemas worldwide, it became a hit, earning more than Spider-Man 2 in the Philippines.

In 2005, Unitel acquired worldwide rights to the Filipino-American thriller film Cavite.

In 2010, MediaQuest Holdings acquired a 30% stake of Unitel Group. As part of Unitel's alliance with MediaQuest, it ventured into TV production with the 2010 series Inday Wanda, starring Eugene Domingo. Among its co-productions are I Do Bidoo Bidoo: Heto nAPO Sila! (2012) and Maledicto (2019).

In 2016, Unitel and MediaQuest launched an annual indie film festival CineFilipino.

In 2024, Unitel and TVJ Productions co-produced the Eat Bulaga! Lenten Special. In the same year Unitel Pictures made a comeback with the movie Mujigae with a new name UXS or Unitel Straight Shooters.
