= Prathyardhi =

- Promotional poster
- Directed by: Shankar Mudavath
- Produced by: Sanjay Saha
- Starring: Ravi Varma Adduri; Rohit Behal; Akshata Sonawane
- Cinematography: Rakesh Goud Maisa
- Edited by: Rakesh Goud Maisa
- Music by: Songs: Bheems Ceciroleo; Prini Siddhant Madhav; Score: Paul Praveen
- Production company: Gaalu Paalu Dream Entertainments
- Release date: 6 January 2023
- Country: India
- Language: Telugu

Prathyardhi (transl. Rival) is a 2023 Indian Telugu-language crime thriller film directed by Shankar Mudavath and starring Ravi Varma Adduri, Rohit Behal and Akshata Sonawane. The film was released to mixed-to-negative reviews.

== Cast ==
- Ravi Varma Adduri as SI Krishna Prasad
- Rohit Behal as Shiva
- Akshata Sonawane as Nitya
- Neelima Pathakamsetti
- Thagubothu Ramesh as Advocate Rajasekhar
- Vamsee Aloor as Constable Satya
- Sana as Jaya
- Balveer Singh as Ashok
- Thummala Narsimha Reddy as Lawyer Raghunath
- Thotapalli Madhu as Judge
- Sneha Guptha
- Sneha Namanandi

== Soundtrack ==
Prathyardhi

Soundtrack album by Bheems Ceciroleo
- Released: 2023
- Length: 7:13
- Language: Telugu
- Label: Aditya Music

Bheems Ceciroleo chronology
Dhamaka (2022)	Prathyardhi (2023)	Balagam (2023)

The music was composed by Bheems Ceciroleo and Prini Siddhant Madhav.

Track listing
No.	Title	Lyrics	Music	Singer(s)	Length
1.	"Edo Nasha Nasha"	Suresh Gangula	Bheems Ceciroleo	Mohana Bhogaraju	3:30
2.	"Nee Kanulalo"	Prini Siddhant Madhav	Prini Siddhant Madhav	Javed Ali	3:43
Total length:					7:13

== Reception ==
A critic from Sakshi rated the film 2 3/4 out of 5 and wrote that "this is director Shankar's first film. He succeeded in increasing the curiosity of the audience without revealing the twists till the climax. Background music by Paul Praveen is a plus for the movie. Rakesh Goud's camera work is good. The production values are below par for the film".
