= Ra Ra Sarasukku Ra Ra =

Indian romantic comedy film

- Release poster
- Directed by: Keshav Depur
- Written by: Pon Murugan
- Produced by: Jayalakshmi
- Starring: Karthik Pamidimukkala; Gayathri Patel; Kalloori Vinoth
- Cinematography: R. Ramesh
- Edited by: Marthand K Venkatesh
- Music by: GKV
- Production company: Sky Wanders Entertainment
- Distributed by: 9V Studios
- Release date: 3 November 2023
- Country: India
- Language: Tamil

Ra Ra Sarasukku Ra Ra (transl. Come, come near me) is a 2023 Indian Tamil-language romantic comedy film written and directed by Keshav Depur. The film stars Karthik Pamidimukkala and Gayathri Patel in the lead roles. The film was produced by Jayalakshmi under the banner of Sky Wanders Entertainment. The film's title is based on a song from Chandramukhi (2005).

== Cast ==
- Karthik Pamidimukkala as Madhan
- Gayathri Patel
- Kalloori Vinoth
- Gayatri Rema
- Vishweshwar Akula
- Deepika Paul
- Simran Raj
- Ravi Varma
- Gayathri Radhakrishnan
- Saraa Aachar
- Akshitha Ashok
- Katpadi Rajan
- KPY Bala

== Production ==
The film was produced by Jayalakshmi under the banner of Sky Wanders Entertainment. The cinematography was done by R. Ramesh, while editing was handled by Marthand K. Venkatesh. The trailer of the film was released on 25 October 2023.

== Reception ==
Maalai Malar critic rated two point five out of five and noted that the double meaning lines they speak are well worked out.Thinaboomi critic wrote that although the story takes place in the same location, the special feature of the film is that the actresses are made beautiful without being obscene.
