= Ravi Varma (Kakinada actor) =

Indian actor

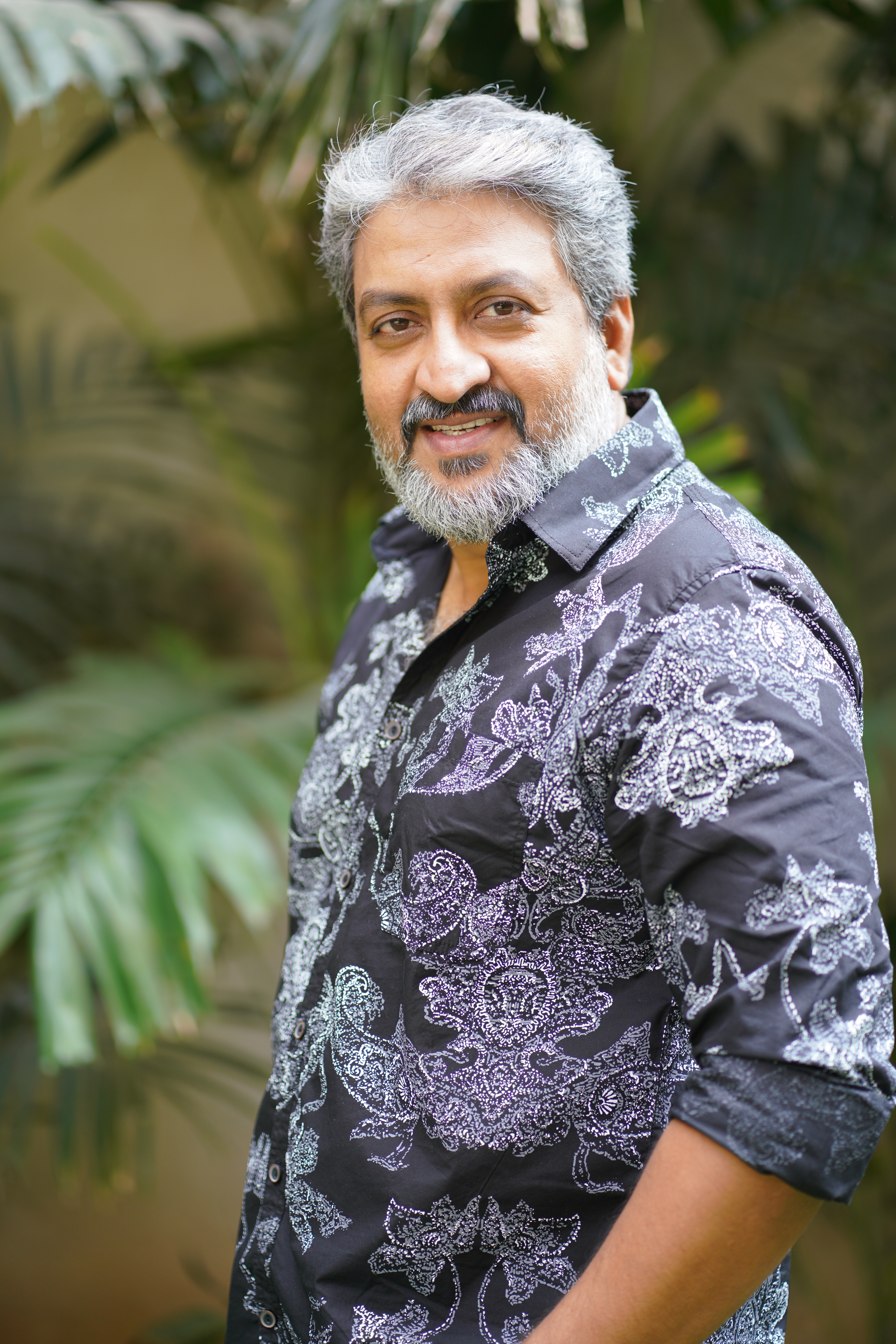
- Born: Ravi Varma Adduri; 12 September 1975 (age 50); Kakinada, Andhra Pradesh, India
- Occupation: Actor
- Years active: 2004–present

Ravi Varma Adduri (born 12 September 1975) is an Indian actor of Telugu films. He is known for playing Selva Swamy in Mogali Rekulu (2008). Before then, he has starred in Aaruguru Pativratalu (2004).

== Early life and career ==
Born in Kakinada, Andhra Pradesh in India, Varma studied Mechatronics from ITE in Singapore.

Varma started acting in 2004 debuting in Aaruguru Pativratalu. He has appeared in Uyyala Jampala (2013), Buchinaidu Kandriga (2020), and Prathyardhi (2023).

== Filmography ==
- Aaruguru Pativratalu (2004)
- Nireekshana (2005)
- Kokila (2006)
- Adivi Biddalu (2006)
- Mee Sreyobhilashi (2007)
- Neramu Siksha (2009)
- Pravarakshudu (2009)
- Swamy Ra Ra (2013)
- Uyyala Jampala (2013)
- Rowdy Fellow (2014)
- O Manishi Katha (2014)
- Basthi (2015)
- Where Is Vidya Balan (2015)
- Dohchay (2015)
- Avunu 2 (2015)
- Okka Ammayi Thappa (2016)
- Meeku Meere Maaku Meme (2016)
- Ram NRI (2016)
- Marala Telupuna Priya (2016)
- Premika (2017)
- Okka Kshanam (2017)
- Fashion Designer s/o Ladies Tailor (2017)
- Nannu Dochukunduvate (2018)
- Dear Comrade (2019)
- Sye Raa Narasimha Reddy (2019)
- Dhrusti (2019)
- Rajdooth (2019)
- Kala Karudu (2020)
- Buchinaidu Kandriga (2020)
- Thellavarithe Guruvaram (2021)
- Naandhi (2021)
- Shekar (2022)
- Alluri (2022)
- Itlu Maredumilli Prajaneekam (2022)
- 18 Pages (2022)
- Prathyardhi (2023)
- Sindhooram (2023)
- Malli Pelli (2023)
- Ra Ra Sarasukku Ra Ra (2023; Tamil)
- Pindam (2023)
- Kalasa (2023)
- Naa Saami Ranga (2024)
- Vidya Vasula Aham (2024)
- Laggam (2024)
- Sri Sri Sri Raja Vaaru (2025)

=== Television ===
- Mogali Rekulu (2008)
- 3 Roses (2021)
