= Buchinaidu Kandriga (film) =

2020 Indian film in Telugu

- Promotional poster
- Directed by: Krishna Poluru
- Produced by: Pamidimukkala Chandra Kumari
- Starring: Munna; Drishika Chander
- Cinematography: Ram K. Mahesan
- Edited by: Marthand K. Venkatesh
- Music by: Mihiraamsh
- Distributed by: aha
- Release date: 21 August 2020
- Running time: 122 minutes
- Country: India
- Language: Telugu

Buchinaidu Kandriga is a 2020 Indian Telugu-language romantic drama film directed by Krishna Poluru and starring Munna and Drishika Chander with Ravi Varma in a negative role. The film was released on aha on 21 August 2020.

== Cast ==
- Munna as Balu
- Drishika Chander as Swapna
- Ravi Varma as Swapna's father
- Subbarao
- Prabhavathi
- Pavithra Jayaram

== Soundtrack ==
Buchinaidu Kandriga

Soundtrack album by Mihiraamsh
- Released: 2020
- Recorded: 2020
- Genre: Feature film soundtrack
- Length: 18:50
- Language: Telugu

Official audio
- Buchinaidu Kandriga - Full Album on YouTube

The music was composed by Mihiraamsh.

Track listing
No.	Title	Singer(s)	Length
1.	"Arere"	Aditi Bhavaraju	2:17
2.	"Koduku"	Suresh	3:53
3.	"Kottha Lokam"	Aditi Bhavaraju	3:32
4.	"O Silaka"	Sai Charan	2:56
5.	"Prema O Prema"	Adheef Mohamed	2:29
6.	"Priyathama"	Sai Charan	3:43
Total length:			18:50

== Reception ==
A critic from The Times of India rated the film two out of five stars and wrote that "While it’s worth appreciation that Poluru chooses to touch upon the subject of honour killings, showing how it’s a relevant subject even today is something the film fails at". A critic from Samayam gave the film the same rating and wrote that "The whole movie seems to be going in a flow but some scenes are boring here and there. Another minus is that there is not a single scene that will amaze the audience".
