= Blood Money (2021 film) =

2021 Indian film

- Official release poster
- Directed by: Sarjun KM
- Screenplay by: Sarjun KM; Sankar Dass
- Dialogues by: Sankar Dass
- Story by: S. Nabil Ahamed
- Produced by: Irfan Malik
- Starring: Priya Bhavani Shankar; Metro Shirish; Kishore; Vishrutha child Artist
- Cinematography: G. Balamurugan
- Edited by: Prasanna GK
- Music by: Satish Raghunathan
- Production company: Emperor Entertainment
- Distributed by: ZEE5
- Release date: 24 December 2021
- Running time: 89 minutes
- Country: India
- Language: Tamil

Blood Money is a 2021 Indian Tamil-language thriller film directed by Sarjun KM and produced by Emperor Entertainment. It is written by Sarjun KM and Sankar Dass from a story by S. Nabil Ahamed. The film stars Priya Bhavani Shankar, Metro Shirish, and Kishore in the lead roles. The film revolves around a journalist from Tamil Nadu who goes on a mission to save two men whose lives are at stake in Kuwait prison. The film was released on 24 December 2021 on ZEE5.

== Plot ==
Rachel Victor is a journalist in a news channel who is recently promoted as the sub-editor. Her predecessor Sudhan is on his last day of work. Meanwhile, two Tamil men are shown as prisoners in a Kuwait jail, who are about to be hanged the next day, apparently for an accident case. The mother of the two men make an appeal through the district collector, who advises her that legal procedures would take days and asks her to make a plea video and circulate it on social media.

Rachel comes across the video and decides to help them. She learns that the men were accused of murdering a Sri Lankan woman in Kuwait and have been in jail for the last five years, even though the men claim that they are innocent. Through a Muslim organization in Tamil Nadu, the blood money for the victim was arranged on behalf of the two men. As per Kuwait law, if the victim's family provides a letter of forgiveness on the two men, they will be spared.

Rachel then learns through some former government officials that the blood money was not received by the victim's family as they were all displaced due to the Sri Lankan War. As the hanging time approaches, she feels that getting the letter of forgiveness is the only option to save the two men. Rachel and Sudhan travel to Sri Lanka via boat and find out the victim's family. She convinces them to forgive the two men as they are really innocent and asks for their help to save their lives. Reluctant at first, the family finally agrees, and they record a video of their statement, forgiving the two men. Rachel sends this video to the lawyer in Kuwait, who intervenes just in time to stop the punishment from being carried out, saving the two men. They are finally released after six months and reach back home to meet their family, thanking Rachel.

== Cast ==
- Priya Bhavani Shankar as Rachel Victor
- Metro Shirish as Sudhan
- Kishore as Kaliyappan
- Baby Vishrutha as Suganthi, Kaliyappan's daughter
- Subbu Panchu
- Vinod Sagar
- Srilekha Rajendran
- Senthil Kumaran

== Release ==
The film was released on 24 December 2021 on ZEE5 and opened to decent reviews from critics.

== Reception ==
Logesh Balachandran of The Times of India rated the film with 2.5 out of 5 stars, stating that, "Blood Money is a good suspense thriller with brilliant concept but fails to engage the audience due to weak screenplay." Navein Darshan of Cinema Express stated that, "Blood Money is a film filled with tasteful performances and it was especially a delight to see actors like Priya and Kishore perform in close-ups. But the one performer who effortlessly steals the show is the young Vishrutha. She strengthens the emotional core of the film with her subtle expressions and when she breaks down, your heart just melts. Apart from its apt casting, the major plus of Blood Money is its restricted runtime. With a length of less than 90-minutes, the film conveys so much without losing our attention. It is a film that values the time of its audiences a lot and such films deserve more love from us." ABP Live wrote, "Blood Money' is inspired by a real life incident. However, the team has exaggerated certain portions to add to the drama and this definitely does more harm than good to the film's interests. Blood Money might have its share of problems but on the whole, it works." Ashameera Aiyappan of Firstpost rated the film with 2.5 out of 5 stars, stating that, "On paper, Blood Money has all the ingredients for a taut thriller. But the film doesn’t dig deep into the details and thus, reveals don’t land as it aspires to." Siby Jeyya of India Herald called that, "the movie ends as a watchable thriller just for her [Priya Bhavani Shankar] sake."
