= Ananda Krishnan (director) =

Indian film director

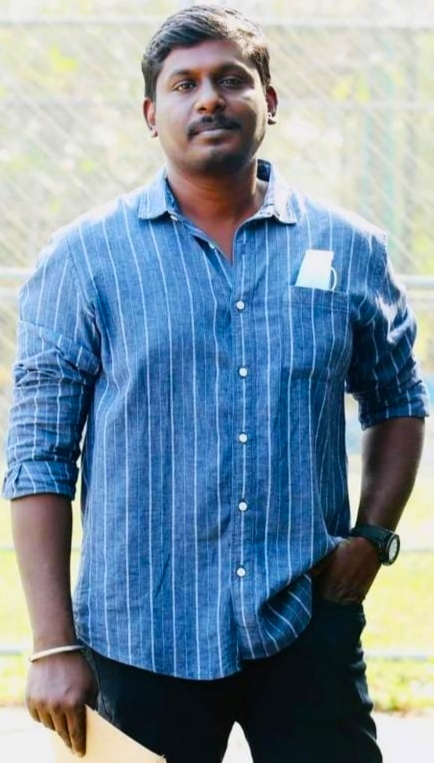
- Born: Pondicherry, India
- Occupations: Film director, Screenwriter, producer
- Years active: 2014-present
- Notable work: Metro (2016)

Ananda Krishnan is an Indian film director working in Tamil cinema, best known for directing the 2016 action crime film Metro.

== Career ==
In 2014, he made his directional debut through Aal. The film was produced by Shoundaryan Pictures. It was an official remake of the Hindi movie Aamir featuring Vidharth. In 2016, he produced and directed an action thriller film Metro under his banner Metro Productions.

in 2024, he worked on his upcoming film Non-Violence.

== Filmography ==
Year	Title	Credited as			Notes	Ref.
Year	Title	Director	Writer	Producer	Notes	Ref.
2014	Aal	Yes	Yes	No	Co-written by Raj Kumar Gupta	
2016	Metro	Yes	Yes	Yes		
2021	Kodiyil Oruvan	Yes	Yes	No		
2025	Robber	No	Yes	Yes		
TBA	Non-Violence	Yes	Yes	No		
