= V. V. Lakshminarayana =

Indian politician and retired bureaucrat

- Born: Vasagiri Venkata Lakshminarayana; 3 April 1965 (age 61); Kadapa, Andhra Pradesh, India
- Other name: JD Lakshminaryana
- Education: NIT Warangal; IIT Madras
- Occupations: IPS Officer, Agriculturist, Social Worker
- Years active: 1990–2018
- Political party: Jai Bharat National party
- Other political affiliations: Janasena Party (2019-2020)
- Police career
- Department: Maharashtra Police; Central Bureau of Investigation
- Service years: Indian Police Service, 1990-2018
- Status: Retired voluntarily
- Rank: Additional Director General of Police

Vasagiri Venkata Lakshminarayana is an Indian politician and retired Indian Police Service officer from Andhra Pradesh. He served as the Additional Director General of Police in Mumbai, Maharashtra. He is known for leading the investigations like OMC Scandal, Emaar Properties, Y S Jagan Mohan Reddy Case, Satyam Scandal and Disproportionate Assets. He had previously held the post of Joint Commissioner of Police of Thane, Maharashtra and before that as Inspector general of police Rank under Y-category security for dealing with high-profile corruption cases. He contested from Visakhapatnam constituency in the 2019 Indian general election from Jana Sena Party. He has resigned from the Jana Sena Party in 2020.

== Early life ==
He was born on 3 April 1965 in Kadapa Dist Andhra Pradesh and was brought up in Srisailam, Kurnool Dist, Andhra Pradesh, where his father was an Irrigation officer and mother was a School teacher . He received his Bachelor of Technology in the Mechanical Engineering from the NIT Warangal in 1986. He did his MTech from the Indian Institute of Technology Madras. He was an Addl. Director General of Police, Maharashtra cadre from the 1990 batch of Indian Police Service. He secured all India rank 204 in Civil Services.

== Career ==
He worked as a Superintendent of police for Nanded and then for the Maharashtra Anti-Terrorism Squad. He was posted as Deputy inspector general of police (DIG), CBI at Hyderabad on 12 June 2006, as he was keen to work for the CBI agency. He was initially posted as the CBI unit head for a period of five years and then given extension for two years on his promotion as the Joint Director(JD). He successfully investigated the Satyam Scandal as a Deputy inspector general of police Rank. As a Joint Director of CBI, he carried out Investigations of Obulapuram Mining Corporation (OMC) case and Y S Jagan Mohan Reddy's Disproportionate Assets case among other 27 high-profile cases.

He is known for his impact speeches and has interacted with more than 40 lakh youth so far. He is an active member of Lead India Foundation which was started with the blessings of Dr. APJ Abdul Kalam. Sri. V.V. Lakshmi Narayana donated blood 61 times so far.

Sri. V.V. Lakshmi Narayana has announced that he would adopt villages that voluntarily prohibit alcohol. Following on these lines, he has adopted three villages, Chinnamandadi of Mahabubnagar District, Sahalalaputtuga of Srikakulam District and Seetharamapuram of Vizianagaram District.

He took voluntary retirement in 2018 and extensively toured all the 13 Districts of Andhra Pradesh understanding prominent issues especially those of farmers, youth and women.

== Political career ==
After his tour to all the Districts, he has announced that issues of farmers, youth, women would be his areas of focus, and that zero budget politics would be his primary agenda. Lakshminarayana later met with Jana Sena party president Pawan Kalyan and joined Jana Sena Party. He has contested for Visakhapatnam (Lok Sabha constituency) in the Indian General Elections – 2019. He finished the race by standing in third place. He secured 2,88, 754 votes. He resigned to Janasena party on 30 January 2020 due to some internal reasons such as the party supremo re-entry to films.

He started Jai Bharat National party on Friday 22 December 2023 to bring change in politics. He has filed his nomination from the Visakhapatnam North Assembly constituency for the 2024 Andhra Pradesh Legislative Assembly election.

A foundation by the name Join for Development Foundation ( JD Foundation) has been started under his Chairmanship and is working in the areas of Agriculture, Rural Development, Youth innovations, Environment and related areas. A Farmer Producer Organisation (FPO) has been initiated by the Foundation at Yazili, Guntur District. The temple town of Bhadrachalam has been made plastic free with the initiative of the foundation. Dr. Abdul Kalam Innovation festival has been organised and the young innovators have been suitably rewarded and felicitated.

== Awards ==
Narayana has received the Indian police medal in 2006. He also has been awarded the Mahatma Gandhi Peace Prize by the Minority Commission of Maharashtra. He has been conferred with the Presidents Police Medal for Distinguished Services on 26 January 2017. He has also received "Distinguished Alumnus" award in 2016 from his alma mater NIT Warangal in the category of Distinguished Alumni Public Service Award (DAPSA). He received Vivekananda Excellency Award from Ramakrishna Seva Samithi.
