= Snatch theft =

Criminal act

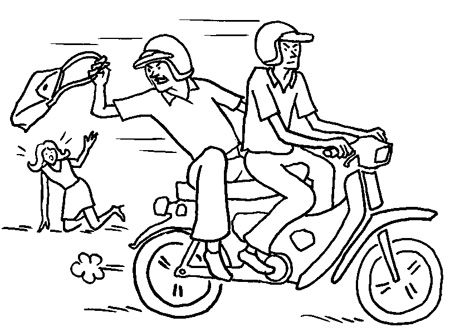
A drawing illustrating snatch thieves stealing a purse from a woman via motorbike.

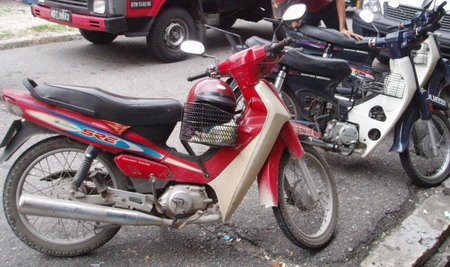
These types of mopeds are typically used by snatch thieves

Snatch theft is a criminal act, common in Southeast Asia, South America, and Southern Europe, of forcefully stealing a pedestrian's personal property by employing rob-and-run tactics.

== Description ==
It is typical for two thieves to work together and ride a motorcycle, moped, or other type of motorbike to make theft and escape easier. One person steers the vehicle while another, the snatcher, does the act of theft itself. However, some snatch thieves work alone or do not use a vehicle to escape.

== Argentina ==
In Argentina this form of robbery increased by 118% between the years 2008 and 2009, possibly because motorbikes have become a lot cheaper and more accessible to the public. In that country, the perpetrators are called motochorros, a neologism from the words moto (motorcycle) and chorro (a vulgar term for "thief").

== Indonesia ==
In Indonesia, snatchers who usually operate while riding motorcycles are locally known as jambret.

== Malaysia ==
A growing problem in Malaysia, some instances of snatch theft have caused fatalities, when the person holding onto the handbag has been dragged by the motorbike, or through subsequent acts of violence. This, combined with the apparent lack of police control over crime, has prompted outrage among its citizens enough to resort to vigilantism in apprehending thieves.

== Philippines ==
In the Philippines, a crime including snatch theft that is committed by two persons or more is called "riding in tandem". The term normally applies to two men riding on a motorcycle in tandem. The phrase "riding in tandem" was suggested as a 2014 "Filipino word of the year".

In Mandaluyong, an ordinance was passed to counter the crimes committed by persons riding in tandem. For easy identification, Dagupan, Cotabato City, Dumaguete and Batac have local laws prohibiting motorcycle riders from wearing helmets. In Quezon City, the local police considered a measure that would require riders of motorcycles to wear vests displaying the license plate numbers of their vehicles.

Due to the rise of riding in tandem crimes, Philippine Senator Tito Sotto proposed a bill that would allow motorcycles to be ridden only by one person, with some exceptions. According to the Philippine National Police, there were more than 3,000 cases involving crimes related to "riding in tandem".

== See also ==
- Phone snatching
- Pickpocketing
