= Dharani Dharan =

Indian film director

P.V.Dharanidharan
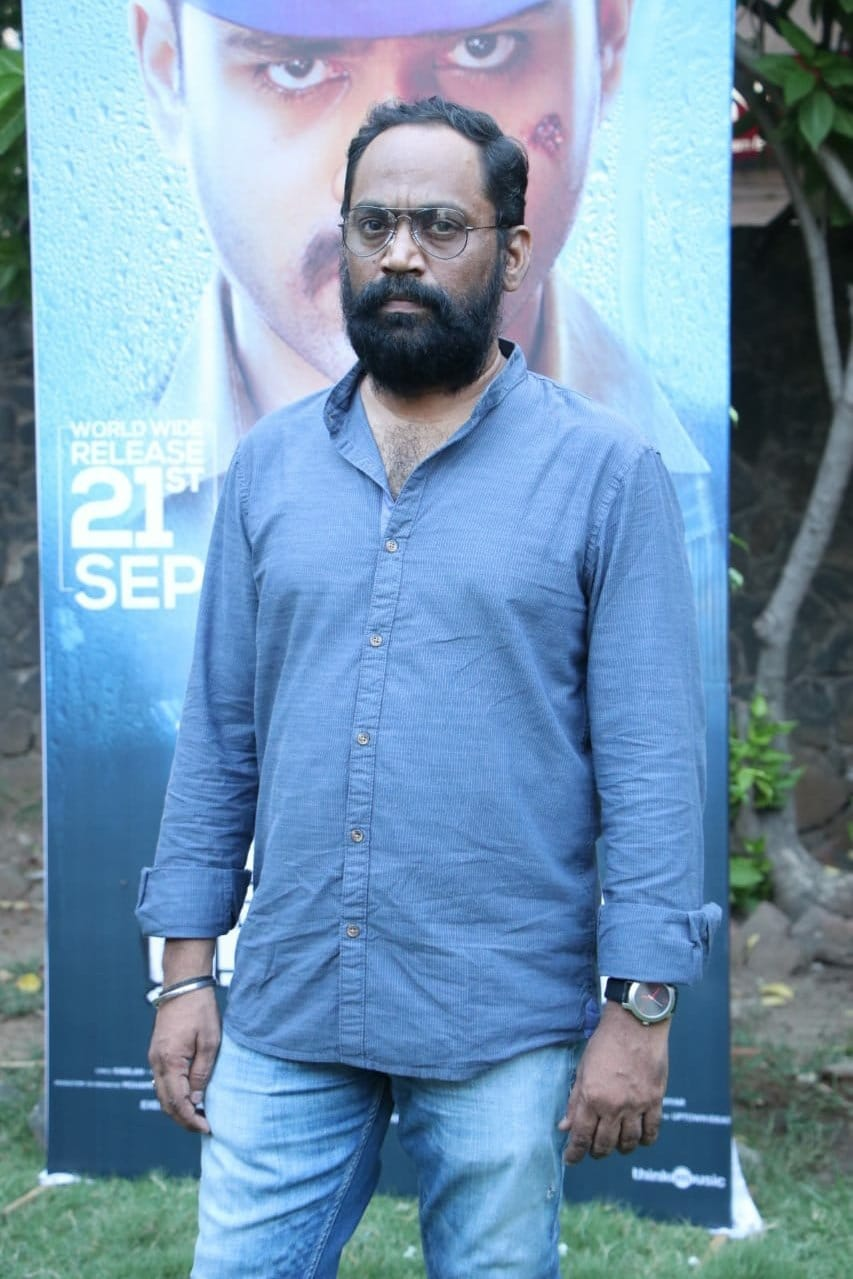
- Director Dharanidharan
- Born: Chennai, India
- Education: MBA
- Occupations: Film director, Screenwriter, Film producer
- Years active: 2014 – present

Dharani Dharan is an Indian film director and screenwriter working primarily in the Tamil cinema.

== Career ==
After quitting his IT job he worked as an assistant director for Susi Ganesan in Kanthaswamy. he made his directorial debut with Burma in 2014. His second directorial venture Jackson Durai is a horror comedy released in July 2016 under Sri Green Productions. His third directorial venture Raja Ranguski is a murder mystery, music composed by Yuvan Shankar Raja and produced under his own banner "Burma Talkies", released in September 2018. His Fourth directorial venture Ranger is a Tiger-based movie, Shoot completed by Feb 2020, now movie in the post-production stage.

== Filmography ==
Year	Film	Director	Writer	Producer	Notes
2014	Burma	Yes	Yes	No	
2016	Jackson Durai	Yes	Yes	No	
2018	Raja Ranguski	Yes	Yes	Yes	
2027	Jackson Durai 2	Yes	Yes	No	Filming
