= Cavite (film) =

- Theatrical release poster
- Directed by: Neill Dela Llana; Ian Gamazon
- Written by: Neill Dela Llana; Ian Gamazon
- Produced by: Quynn Ton; Neill Dela Llana; Ian Gamazon
- Starring: Ian Gamazon
- Cinematography: Neill Dela Llana
- Edited by: Neill Dela Llana; Ian Gamazon
- Production company: Gorilla Films
- Distributed by: Truly Indie; Magnolia Pictures; Unitel Pictures (Philippines)
- Release dates: 2005 (IFFR); May 26, 2006 (U.S.)
- Running time: 80 minutes
- Countries: Philippines; United States
- Languages: English; Filipino; Tagalog

Cavite is a 2005 thriller film in English, Filipino and Tagalog, written and directed by Filipino American filmmakers Neill Dela Llana and Ian Gamazon which also stars them as the film's leads. An Indian film Aamir bought adaptation rights due to similarity in the story.

== Plot ==
Flying back to the Philippines to bury his father, an American man is informed by a mysterious phone caller that his mother and sister have been kidnapped and will be killed if he doesn't comply with certain demands. As he follows the phone caller's every wish, he slowly realizes that he is involved in a large conspiracy hatched by the Abu Sayyaf.

== Critical reception ==
Cavite was met with largely positive critical reviews. The film has a score of 73% on Rotten Tomatoes based on 40 reviews with the consensus being it is "A gritty, low-budget thriller, Cavite takes us on a heart-pounding ride through the seedy Filipino underworld."

Robert Koehler from Variety in his glowing review of the film said "For a guerrilla-style, no-budget Yank indie to even tackle issues of jihad terror and naive Western thinking is noteworthy in itself, but Gamazon and Dela Llana inflame the issues with a gutsy, athletic filmmaking package."

Entertainment Weekly gave Cavite a B+ declaring it "one of those blistering no-budget thrillers, like Open Water or Detour, in which the film's economy of means is the trigger for its ingenuity".

Kevin Crust of the Los Angeles Times said "Though the film seldom deviates from its thriller format, Gamazon and Dela Llana astutely weave in matters of political, cultural and religious importance, elevating Cavite well above mere genre."

Kirk Honeycutt of The Hollywood Reporter praised the film's directing saying that it's "Guerilla filmmaking at its finest".

Dennis Lim of Village Voice wrote in his positive review is that as "a paragon of guerrilla resourcefulness and a model citizen of the global village, Cavite is a more anxious and vivid experience than most movies with budgets literally a thousand times bigger".
