= Aamir (film) =

2008 Indian thriller film

- Promotional poster for Aamir
- Directed by: Raj Kumar Gupta
- Written by: Raj Kumar Gupta
- Produced by: Ronnie Screwvala
- Starring: Rajeev Khandelwal; Gajraj Rao
- Cinematography: Alphonse Roy
- Edited by: Aarti Bajaj
- Music by: Amit Trivedi
- Production company: UTV Spotboy
- Distributed by: UTV Motion Pictures
- Release date: 6 June 2008
- Running time: 96 minutes
- Country: India
- Language: Hindi

Aamir is a 2008 Indian Hindi-language thriller film written and directed by debutante Raj Kumar Gupta and produced by Ronnie Screwvala under newly spun-off UTV Spotboy, the avant-garde project arm of UTV Motion Pictures. The film stars debutante Rajeev Khandelwal as the titular Muslim doctor who upon returning to Mumbai is coerced into a terrorist conspiracy by a mysterious caller and his henchmen. Gajraj Rao voices the unknown caller.

Aamir features music composed by debutante Amit Trivedi, and marks the co-production debuts of future UTV president Siddharth Roy Kapur and filmmaker Vikas Bahl, the latter of whom also plays a brief role. Although the film was initially said to be adapted from the Filipino film Cavite, the makers of Aamir were given a no-objection certificate by Neill Dela Llana and Ian Gamazon, the director duo of Cavite, who were also thanked by the makers of Aamir in the film's prelude. Gupta further claimed a decade later that the film was instead inspired by the post-9/11 era.

Aamir opened theatrically on 6 June 2008. Upon release, it received favorable reviews from critics and viewers, including Sheila Dikshit, the then Chief Minister of Delhi. Praised for its direction, production, script, cinematography and music, the film was a commercial success.

== Plot ==
The film begins with London-based Dr. Aamir Ali returning to Mumbai on vacation. Upon arrival at the airport, an unknown person hands him a cellphone. The caller asks him to follow instructions. Though initially reluctant, he finds himself chasing after a taxi driver working for the caller. With his luggage gone inside the taxi, Aamir is handed over the phone again. He sees a video on the phone and realizes that his family has been kidnapped. Not sure what to do, he hesitantly agrees to follow the instructions when told that his family will be released if he does so.

The instructor asks Aamir to think of Islam and wants him to do something for his religion rather than work and live in a foreign country. He is then made to go to a hotel, where he is given an address. From there, he goes to a PCO and calls an anonymous number from Karachi, following which a suspecting cop chases after him. Escaping, he is told to stay in a lodge, where a lame man asks him to follow him. Aamir is then led to a house, where he is given a red briefcase. Initially thinking the briefcase is a bomb, he opens it and finds that it is full of money. From the lodge, he is asked to catch a particular bus at a designated time.

He leaves to catch the bus but is beaten up on the way and has the briefcase stolen. In order to retrieve it, he enlists the help of a prostitute whom he met at the lodge. After finding the place, he fights off the robbers and takes the briefcase. He then hurries to catch the bus while talking to the caller. Once inside the bus, he is told to put the briefcase underneath his seat and leave. Aamir now realises that his briefcase has been switched. Instead of money, they have put a bomb inside it. He alights from the bus, but looking at a young passenger innocently waving at him, decides to return. Looking at the traffic signal countdown, he rushes through the crowded bus and retrieves the briefcase. He then runs towards a work-in-progress area and clears it by alerting the workers. Realizing this is the end, he holds on to the briefcase tightly. Having heard about this through his henchmen, the caller calls Aamir, who smiles and refuses to answer. As the countdown reaches the zero mark, the bomb explodes, killing Aamir. The caller is devastated to learn of his plan's failure. Media reporters cover the blast, believing Aamir to be a suicide bomber who "backed out in the last minute out of fear."

== Cast ==
- Rajeev Khandelwal as Dr. Aamir Ali
- Gajraj Rao as The Caller
- Rohitash Gaud as a Customs officer I
- Sudipto Balav as a Customs officer II
- Vikas Bahl as Amar Bahl
- Aishwarya as Shabana Pataudi
- Shashanka Ghosh as Khan
- Uday Sabnis as Bald man
- Supavitra Babul as Man in the aircraft
- Sanjay Kulkarni as the Police inspector
- Vasan Bala as Whispering man at the airport
- Jaywant Wadkar as National Restaurant owner
- Sneha as Falak

== Production ==
Aamir was released on 6 June alongside the Ram Gopal Varma-directed Sarkar Raj. Shot on a budget of ₹20 million (US$210,000), it is a thriller set in the streets of Mumbai. Aamir is also the debut film of its lead actor, cinematographer, music director and the producer UTV Spotboy. The tagline of the film is "Kaun Kehta Hai Aadmi Apni Kismat Khud Likhta Hai?" ("Who says a man writes his own destiny?")

Regarding allegations that the film was copied from the 2005 Filipino film Cavite, Gupta explained he did not watch it, and that it took him a year to write Aamir, which would not have happened if it was copied. He further mentioned contacting the makers of Cavite to clarify that the script of Aamir was written before theirs was released. The makers Neill Dela Llana and Ian Gamazon, who wished Gupta luck and explained how Cavite itself was alleged to be inspired by the American films Phone Booth and Cellular, were thanked by makers of Aamir in the film's prelude.

== Reception ==
Raj Kumar Gupta was commended for his fine writing and directorial work. Rajeev Masand of CNN-IBN praised the film's tight script and direction, while Raja Sen of Rediff praised its realism, cinematography and music. Other reviews were also mostly positive. Reviewer at VjMOVIEws noted that, "Aamir is a part of such breed of Bollywood movies which never garners the limelight of cinema but still manages to carve a niche for them."

The film had a weak opening due to the new names involved and its story-line but gained widespread word of mouth publicity. It ended up doing good business with a good collection in subsequent weeks.

The film was also academically examined for the way it represents the city and communities.

== Music ==
Aamir

Soundtrack album by Amit Trivedi
- Released: 2008
- Recorded: 2007
- Studio: YRF Studios
- Genre: Feature film soundtrack
- Label: Sony BMG
- Producer: Amit Trivedi

The album contains six tracks composed by Amit Trivedi, with lyrics by Amitabh Bhattacharya, including one instrumental played by Marianne D’Cruz Aiman and Jeetendra Thakur. Four bonus tracks are also included: two songs from the Pakistani film Khuda Kay Liye and two songs from Kailash Kher.

Track list
No.	Title	Music	Artist(s)	Length
1.	"Ha Raham"	Amit Trivedi and Abrar ul Haq	Murtuza-Qadir, Amit Trivedi, Amitabh Bhattacharya	5:10
2.	"Chakkar Ghumyo"	Amit Trivedi	Amit Trivedi	3:32
3.	"Haara"	Amit Trivedi	Amit Trivedi	4:17
4.	"Phas Gaya (Never Mind)"	Amit Trivedi	Neuman Pinto	4:03
5.	"Ek Lau"	Amit Trivedi	Shilpa Rao, Amitabh Bhattacharya	4:28
6.	"Climax Theme (instrumental)"	Amit Trivedi	Marianne D'Cruz	6:03
Total length:				27:33

Bonus tracks
No.	Title	Music	Artist(s)	Length
7.	"Allah Hoo"	Rohail Hyatt	Saeen Zahoor, Zara Madani	4:10
8.	"Dilruba"	Kailash Kher	Kailash Kher	3:33
9.	"Bandya"	Rohail Hyatt	Khawar Jawad, Faiza Mujahid	3:15
10.	"Chhap Tilak"	Kailash Kher	Kailash Kher	5:04
Total length:				16:04

== Home Video ==
Three DVD editions of the film were released, by UTV Home Entertainment, Moser Baer and Eagle Home Entertainment. The UTV DVD was released on 5 July 2008, and was launched by Rajeev Khandelwal.

The film is available to stream on Prime Video.

== Adaptation and remake ==
Although the producer of Aamir insisted that the story was written independently, they also bought adaptation rights to Cavite due to similarity.

Aamir was remade in Tamil as Aal (2014).
