= Bewars =

2018 Telugu, comedy drama film

- Film poster
- Directed by: Ramesh Cheppala
- Written by: Ramesh Cheppala
- Produced by: Ponnala Chandu; Dr. M. S. Murthy co-Aravind
- Starring: Rajendra Prasad; Sanjosh; Harshita; Divya Kola
- Cinematography: Chitti Babu K.
- Edited by: M. R. Varma
- Music by: Sunil Kashyap
- Production company: Sri Sai Krupa Entertainments
- Release date: 12 October 2018
- Running time: 133 mins
- Country: India
- Language: Telugu

Bewars is a 2018 Telugu-language drama film directed by Ramesh Cheppala and starring Rajendra Prasad, Sanjosh, Harshita in the lead roles with music composed by Sunil Kashyap.

== Cast ==
- Rajendra Prasad as Satya Murthy
- Sanjosh as Lucky
- Harshita Panwar as Aaradhya
- Pratap as Karthik
- Divya Kola as Siri
- Kasi Viswanath
- Vasu Inturi
- Madhunandan
- Gautham Raju

== Soundtrack ==
Bewars

Soundtrack album by Sunil Kashyap
- Released: 30 September 2018
- Recorded: 2018
- Genre: Feature film soundtrack
- Length: 19:55
- Language: Telugu
- Label: Aditya Music
- Producer: Sunil Kashyap

Sunil Kashyap chronology
Rogue (2017)	Bewars (2018)
External audio
- Audio Jukebox on YouTube

Music composed by Sunil Kashyap. Music released on ADITYA Music Company.

No.	Title	Lyrics	Singer(s)	Length
1.	"Naa Istamochinatlu"	Bhaskarabhatla	Anurag Kulkarni, Yazin Nizar	4:15
2.	"Rasakkali Rasakkali"	Aravind Mandem	Sunil Kashyap	3:33
3.	"Kanthi Poola Pandaga"	Bhaskarabhatla	Hemachandra, Divya	4:08
4.	"Thalli Thalli"	Suddala Ashok Teja	Sunil Kashyap	3:23
5.	"Rara Naa Attakodaka"	Karsarla Shyam	Anurag Kulkarni, Ashwini	3:00
6.	"Anutuleni Prema"	Bhaskarabhatla	Ashwini	1:11
Total length:				19:55
