= Burma (film) =

2014 Indian film by Dharani Dharan

- Theatrical release poster
- Directed by: Dharani Dharan
- Written by: Dharani Dharan
- Produced by: Sudharshan Vembutty
- Starring: Michael Thangadurai; Reshmi Menon
- Narrated by: Nassar
- Cinematography: Yuva
- Edited by: Vivek Harshan
- Music by: Sudharshan M Kumar
- Production company: Square Stone Films
- Release date: 12 September 2014
- Country: India
- Language: Tamil

Burma is a 2014 Indian Tamil language crime comedy thriller directed by Dharani Dharan and produced by Sudharshan Vembutty under the banner Square Stone Films. It stars Michael Thangadurai and Reshmi Menon, while Sampath Raj, Atul Kulkarni, Karthik Sabesh and Madhu Raghuram play supporting roles. The music was scored by Sudharshan M Kumar, while cinematography and editing were handled by Yuva and Vivek Harshan. The film released on 12 September 2014.

== Synopsis ==
Burma, who seizes high-priced cars to earn a living, must race against time to steal cars for a gangster or end up losing his life.

== Cast ==
- Michael Thangadurai as Paramanandan (Burma)
- Reshmi Menon as Kalpana (Noodles)
- Sampath Raj as Guna
- Atul Kulkarni as Bothra Seth
- Karthik Sabesh as Boomer
- Kani Kusruti as Clara
- Deepak Paramesh as Charles
- Madhu Raghuram as Maaran
- Tarun Master as Shankar, Kalpana's father
- K. G. Mohan as Velu
- Thanjai Mahendran as Kumar
- Sai Dheena as Broker Ravi
- Diana Vishalini as Devi
- Sharath as Maruthi
- C. M. Bala as Arunachalam
- Rajkumar as Thaadi Mohan
- Chandana as Jessica
- Jayaraj as Karuppu
- Ram as Brucelee
- Hitler as Jetlee
- Jasper as Don
- Madurai Joseph as IG Vijayakumar
- K. Rajasekhar as Rummy Raja
- Thamizharasu as Moorthi
- Prathap Rajan as IG Kuzhanthai Velu

== Production ==
Dharani Dharan after quitting his IT job and assisting director Susi Ganesan in Kanthaswamy and Shortcut Romeo wrote a couple of "off-beat scripts" but found out that there was "no market for them" as no big production house approved of the scripts. Sudharshan Vembutty, however, liked the script of Burma and agreed to fund the film. Dharani Dharan had plans to cast popular actors for the lead roles in Burma and met many "top heroes" but said that nobody believed in his script or that they were not interested in the project since it was not produced by a known studio. Therefore, he decided to work with newcomers and cast Michael Thangadurai and Reshmi Menon, who had both appeared in few low-profile films only, in the lead roles. Atul Kulkarni was recruited for a pivotal role, that of a "car financier, who appoints people to recover the car, if funds don't come on time", with the actor telling that he experimented with his hairdo, and got a new hair colour. According to Dharanidharan, Kulkarni and Sampath Raj, are the only two popular actors in the cast, who agreed to work for lesser remuneration than what they usually charge.

Before the actual shoot began, Dharani Dharan shot every scene with Michael, on a 5D camera for one month, like a rehearsal. A luxury vehicle was needed for the film and he approached a BMW team and showed them the script, who were impressed with it and lent a BMW X6 worth ₹ 1.5 crores for the shoot. Most of the story takes place in real places in north Chennai and the team shot in highly crowded places like Royapuram, Pudhupet and Ennore, with the director stating that filming in those locations was "extremely challenging".

== Soundtrack ==
Burma

Soundtrack album to Burma by Sudharshan M Kumar
- Released: 28 August 2014
- Recorded: 2013–14
- Genre: Feature film soundtrack
- Length: 27:31
- Language: Tamil
- Label: Think Music
- Producer: Sudharshan M Kumar

Sudharshan M Kumar composed the soundtrack and film score of Burma. The audio rights were purchased by Think Music India. The lyrics were written by Kabilan Vairamuthu, Aaryan Dinesh, Tupakeys (MC Rude, MC Akram) and S.A. The album features eight tracks and was released on 28 August 2014 by C. V. Kumar at the Suryan FM 93.5 studio in Chennai along with the film's theatrical trailer.

Track listing
No.	Title	Lyrics	Singer(s)	Length
1.	"Vaddi"	Aaryan Dinesh, Tupakeys (MC Rude, MC Akram)	Aaryan Dinesh, Tupakeys (MC Rude, MC Akram)	5:14
2.	"Run For Money Dude"	S A Vigneshvar	Sudharshan M Kumar, Velmurugan	5:43
3.	"Seizing Mania (Instrumental)"		Sudharshan M Kumar	5:26
4.	"Jungle In The City"	S.A.	Rania Reddy, MC Rude	5:23
5.	"Kalavu Pona Nilavu"	Kabilan Vairamuthu	Karthik	5:23
6.	"Counting D' Cars"	S.A.	Suresh Peters, Remya Nambeesan, Sudharshan M Kumar, Jeba, Niyaz, Anisha Lakshmanan	3:28
7.	"Kings Of Garage - Theme"		Sudharshan M Kumar	4:17
8.	"En Moonchum Venaam"	Kabilan Vairamuthu	Ranjith	3:17
Total length:				27:31

== Critical reception ==
Baradwaj Rangan from The Hindu wrote, "There’s so much attitude, atmosphere, flavour and wry comedy in Burma that I readily forgave the minor sins and its major one — the story takes a detour into a race-against-time thriller, and there really isn’t all that much tension. But Dharanidharan doesn’t try to pump in life artificially — everything is beautifully organic, one of a piece...Burma made me so high on how crime can entertain that I almost forgot it doesn’t pay". The New Indian Express wrote, "With its interlinking story lines, a smartly written screenplay and slick narration, the film keeps one engaged for its crisp 96 minutes of viewing time....Burma is a rollicking, breezy roller-coaster ride". IANS gave it a score of 2.5 stars out of 5 and wrote, "Burma could've easily been an excellent film with its interesting premise and an equally exciting non-linear narrative...Dharani uses the narrative style of Guy Ritchie films, but what he misses out is the deft execution style of the latter...Nevertheless, Burma is still a reasonably good watch with some decent performances". Sify called the film a "decent crime-thriller" that was "quite racy and entertaining" but added, "the script is a mess. Some scenes are badly written and incoherent".
