= Metro (2016 film) =

2016 Indian film by Anandakrishnan

- Directed by: Ananda Krishnan
- Written by: Ananda Krishnan
- Produced by: Ananda Krishnan
- Starring: Shirish; Bobby Simha; Sendrayan; Sathya
- Cinematography: N. S. Uthayakumar
- Edited by: M. Ramesh Bharathi
- Music by: Johan Shevanesh
- Production companies: E5 Entertainments; Metro Productions
- Distributed by: Cosmo Village
- Release date: 24 June 2016
- Running time: 119 minutes
- Country: India
- Language: Tamil

Metro is a 2016 Indian Tamil-language action crime film produced and directed by Anandakrishnan. The film, which explores the theme of chain snatching in the outskirts of Chennai, stars Shirish in his film debut, alongside Bobby Simha and Sendrayan.

Metro was released on 24 June 2016 to positive reviews from critics and became a box office success. It was dubbed and released in Telugu under the same name and remade in Kannada as Siliconn City (2017).

== Plot ==
Arivu is a writer for a press and the eldest son of a retired police head constable and his wife. He has a brother named Mathiyazhagan aka Mathi, who is a first-year engineering student. Arivu's middle-class family life is happy with his friend Kumar mingling as one of the family. The problem begins when Mathi, who is pressured by his girlfriend to get a bike, persuades his family to get him a bike. Though hesitant at first, they agree to get him a bike of his choice. However, a delay in getting his bike and seeing his classmate Ganesh spending casually makes him curious to know what he does for money.

Ganesh introduces Mathi to the heinous crime of chain snatching and also introduces Guna, who is heading a gang of young college-going chain snatchers. Mathi joins the gang and starts to earn through chain snatching and get all the things he wants. Mathi decides to do these crimes alone without providing any commission to Guna. Though hesitant at first, the others join him when 2 of the boys get caught by police and Guna does not come to their aid. Mathi goes back to his house to get a chain recently snatched by him, only to find his mother with the chain and all the other gadgets he owns without his parents's knowledge. An argument begins and Mathi pushes his mother to death.

When Arivu and his father arrive home to realize their mother's death, Arivu vows to avenge the loss where Kumar also joins him. During a police investigation, Arivu and Kumar track down a house breaker and nab him to an unknown location, where they torture him and films the whole incident in the camera. Arivu calls the police to hand over the house breaker and runs away with the bag. He takes the bag with 23 kgs of stolen gold chains to a black market buyer. At that place, he finds his mother's chain, which leads him to the chain snatchers. Arivu leaves the place, not before killing all the men in there.

Meanwhile, Mathi injects Guna with a drug that makes him insane and loses his senses. Arivu goes to Guna's place and finds out the next plan of the snatchers. He leaves with Kumar to the place, and a fight ensues where Arivu and Kumar manage to kill 3-4 men. Unknown that the 2 men are his brother and friend, Mathi removes his helmet and reveals himself. Shocked in despair, Arivu and Kumar also reveal themselves, which surprises Mathi. When Mathi pleads with Arivu to spare him, Arivu ignores and kills him. The next day, Arivu and Kumar reveal the truth to Arivu's father and surrenders to the police.

== Cast ==
- Shirish as Arivazhagan
- Bobby Simha as Guna
- Sendrayan as Kumar
- Sathya as Mathiyazhagan
- Maya as Ramya
- L. Raja as Arivu and Mathi's father
- Tulasi as Arivu and Mathi's mother
- Sai Priyanka Ruth as Mathi's lover
- Nishanth as Ganesh
- Sakthivel as ACP
- Rajkumar as Minnal Sekar
- Durai as SI
- Namo Narayana as Agent Chokkalingam
- E. Ramdoss as Office Manager
- Yogi Babu as a man in the subway

== Production ==
Bobby Simha agreed to work on the film as the antagonist in early 2015, despite having begun to work on big budget films and also as the lead actor in other projects. In September 2015, the film's music composer Johan Shevanesh, travelled the Germany to work on the film's sound mixing.

=== Themes ===
Anandakrishnan tells that the film explores the psyche of modern-day criminals' involvement in chain snatching in the outskirts of Chennai.

== Soundtrack ==
In January 2016, actor Karthi launched a single track for the film at the request of the producers.

== Release ==
The film was given an "A" certificate by the Indian Censor Board due to its violent content, the sequences were demanded to be cut short, but Anandakrishnan did not agree as he believed that the content of the story is very strong so therefore he wants to showcase the true Incidents. The Central Board of Film Certification (CBFC) of Tamil Nadu banned the movie, therefore the director sent the movie for the Revising committee. Due to the conflict, the film's release got further delayed. After arriving at an agreement —the film was not cut and retained its "A" Certificate— the release date was fixed as 24 June 2016.

== Reception ==
=== Critical response ===
M. Suganth of The Times of India gave 3/5 stars and wrote "The characters are largely one-note, the performances need finesse, and the writing some tautness." Gauthaman Bhaskaran of Hindustan Times gave 3/5 stars and wrote "Metro, with a stylishly captivating Simha and individual performances that don’t tip overboard into melodrama, is one of the better Tamil movies to have emerged in recent months." Behindwoods gave 2.75/5 stars and wrote "Metro is brutally honest; it could have been a thrilling ride with a tighter screenplay." Baradwaj Rangan of The Hindu wrote "'Metro' opens our eyes to a nasty little ecosystem that thrives right under our nose."
