= List of Tamil film actresses =

This is a list of notable actresses who have played key roles in the Tamil cinema, primarily based in Tamil Nadu.

== 1930s ==
Year	Name	Debut film	Other notable films
1931	T. P. Rajalakshmi	Kovalan	Kalidas (1944), Miss Kamala (1948)
1934	S. D. Subbulakshmi	Pavalakkodi	Naveena Sarangadhara (1936), Sampoorna Ramayanam (1958)

== 1940s ==
Year	Name	Debut film	Other notable films
1941	T. R. Rajakumari	Kacha Devayani	Haridas (1944), Chandralekha (1948)
1944	Pandari Bai	Haridas	Vedhala Ulagam (1948), Marmayogi (1951), Parasakthi (1952), Andha Naal (1954)
1944	Pushpavalli	Dasi Aparanji	Miss Malini (1947), Chakra Dhari (1948), Samsaram (1951)
1947	Anjali Devi	Mahathma Udangar	Marmayogi (1951), Doctor Savithri (1955), Chakravarthi Thirumagal (1957)
1947	S. Varalakshmi	1000 Thalai Vaangi Apoorva Chinthamani	Chakravarthi Thirumagal (1957), Veerapandiya Kattabomman (1959), Poova Thalaiya (1969)
1948	Padmini	Vedhala Ulagam	Veerapandiya Kattabomman (1959), Thillana Mohanambal (1968)
1949	Bhanumathi Ramakrishna	Ratnakumar	Malaikkallan (1954), Madurai Veeran (1956), Nadodi Mannan (1958), Annai (1962)
1949	Vyjayanthimala	Vaazhkai	Vanji Kottai Valipan (1958), Baghdad Thirudan (1960), Then Nilavu (1961)

== 1950s ==
Year	Name	Debut film	Other notable films
1952	Sowcar Janaki	Valayapathi	Bama Vijayam (1967), Iru Kodugal (1969)
1952	Savitri	Kalyanam Panni Paar	Missiamma (1955), Mayabazar (1957), Pasamalar (1961), Thiruvilaiyadal (1965)
1953	C.R. Vijayakumari	Naalvar	Kalyana Parisu (1959), Naanum Oru Penn (1963), Poompuhar (1964), Rajaraja Cholan (1973)
1953	Vidyavathi	Chandirani	En veedu (1953), Alibabavum 40 Thirudargalum (1956), Samaya Sanjeevi (1957)
1954	Sandhya	Karkottai	Malaikkallan (1954), Mayabazar (1957), Minnal Veeran (1959), Baghdad Thirudan (1960), Bale Pandiya (1962), Aasai Alaigal (1963)
1954	Raja Sulochana	Mangalyam	Rangoon Radha (1956), Gulebakavali (1955), Allavudeenum Arputha Vilakkum (1957)
1954	Jamuna	Panam Paduthum Padu	Missiamma (1955), Tenali Raman (1956), Thangamalai Ragasiyam (1957), Nalla Theerpu (1959)
1957	B. Saroja Devi	Thangamalai Ragasiyam	Nadodi Mannan (1958), Puthiya Paravai (1964), Anbe Vaa (1966)
1957	Kanchana	Manaalane Mangaiyin Baakkiyam	Kaadhalikka Neramillai (1964),Adhey Kangal (1967), Shanti Nilayam (1969), Sivandha Mann (1969)
1957	Devika	Manamagan Thevai	Kalathur Kannamma (1960), Paava Mannippu (1957), Bale Pandiya (1962)

== 1960s ==
Year	Name	Debut film	Other notable films
1960	Jayanthi	Yanai Paagan	Annai Illam (1963), Padagotti (1964), Bama Vijayam (1967), Iru Kodugal (1969)
1960	Rajasree	Bhakta Sabari	Panam Panthiyile (1961), Kaadhalikka Neramillai (1964), Bama Vijayam (1967), Kudiyirundha Koyil (1968)
1962	Sachu	Veera Thirumagan	Kaadhalikka Neramillai (1964), Thenmazhai (1966), Bama Vijayam (1967), Delhi Mapillai (1968), Sorgam (1970)
1962	Sheela	Paasam	Vanambadi (1963), Karpagam (1963), Idhayak Kamalam (1965), Vallavan Oruvan (1966)
1963	K. R. Vijaya	Karpagam	Iru Malargal (1967), Dheerga Sumangali (1974)
1963	Sharada	Kunkhumam	Gnana Oli (1972), Ninaithadhai Mudippavan (1975), Mr. Bharath (1986)
1965	J. Jayalalithaa	Vennira Aadai	Adimaippenn (1969), Engirundho Vandhaal (1970), Pattikada Pattanama (1972), Suryagandhi (1973)
1965	Vennira Aadai Nirmala	Vennira Aadai	Ennathan Mudivu (1965), Lakshmi Kalyanam (1968), Mannippu (1969)
1966	Vanisri	Kathal Paduthum Padu	Uyarndha Manithan (1968), Vasantha Maligai (1972), Vani Rani (1974)
1967	Jayabharathi	Anubavi Raja Anubavi	Naan Avanillai (1974), Allaudinaum Arputha Vilakkum (1979), Marupakkam (1990)
1968	Lakshmi	Jeevanaamsam	Dikkatra Parvathi (1974), Sila Nerangalil Sila Manithargal (1977)

== 1970s ==
Year	Name	Debut film	Other notable films
1971	Manjula Vijayakumar	Rickshawkaran	Ulagam Sutrum Valiban (1973), Anbe Aaruyire (1975), Cheran Pandiyan (1991)
1971	Srividya	Delhi To Madras	Annai Velankanni (1971), Apoorva Raagangal (1975), Unarchigal (1976)
1972	Jayachitra	Kurathi Magan	Arangetram (1973), Bharata Vilas (1973), Ponnukku Thanga Manasu (1973)
1973	Jayasudha	Arangetram	Apoorva Raagangal (1975), Mannavan Vanthaanadi (1975), Alaipayuthey (2000)
1973	Latha	Ulagam Sutrum Valiban	Urimaikural (1974), Pallandu Vazhga (1975), Uzhaikkum Karangal (1976)
1974	Sujatha	Aval Oru Thodar Kathai	Annakili (1976), Mupperum Deviyar (1987), Uzhaippali (1993)
1974	Fatafat Jayalaxmi	Aval Oru Thodar Kathai	Iraivan Kodutha Varam (1978), Sakka Podu Podu Raja (1978), Kaali (1980)
1974	Sripriya	Murugan Kaatiya Vazhi	Aattukara Alamelu (1977), Ilamai Oonjaladukirathu (1978), Neeya? (1979)
1974	Shoba	Vairam	Azhiyatha Kolangal (1979), Pasi (1979), Moodu Pani (1980)
1976	Jaya Prada	Manmatha Leelai	Ninaithale Inikkum (1979), Ezhai Jaathi (1993), Dasavathaaram (2008)
1976	Sridevi	Moondru Mudichu	Moondram Pirai (1982), 16 Vayathinile (1977), Sigappu Rojakkal (1978)
1978	Geetha	Bairavi	Kadamai Kanniyam Kattupaadu (1987), Pudhu Pudhu Arthangal (1989), Azhagan (1991)
1978	Saritha	Thappu Thalangal	Netrikkann (1981), Achamillai Achamillai (1984), Julie Ganapathi (2003)
1978	Radhika	Kizhakke Pogum Rail	Moondru Mugam (1982), Poonthotta Kaavalkaaran (1988), Kizhakku Cheemayile (1993)
1979	Ambika	Chakkalathi	Sagalakala Vallavan (1982), Mr. Bharath (1986), Vikram (1986)
1979	Sumalatha	Thisai Maariya Paravaigal	Murattu Kaalai (1980), Kazhugu (1986), Oru Odai Nadhiyagirathu (1983)
1979	Rati Agnihotri	Puthiya Vaarpugal	Ullasa Paravaigal (1980), Murattu Kaalai (1980), Anbukku Naan Adimai (1980)

== 1980s ==
Year	Name	Debut film	Other notable films
1980	Suhasini	Nenjathai Killathe	Palaivana Solai (1981), Sindhu Bhairavi (1985), Manathil Uruthi Vendum (1987)
1980	Vijayashanti	Kallukkul Eeram	Nenjile Thunivirunthal (1981), Mannan (1992), Sri Bannari Amman (2003)
1980	Silk Smitha	Vandichakkaram	Alaigal Oivathillai (1981), Silk Silk Silk (1983), Adhisaya Manithan (1990)
1980	Madhavi	Pudhiya Thoranangal	Thillu Mullu (1981), Raja Paarvai (1981), Thambikku Entha Ooru (1984)
1980	Menaka	Ramayi Vayasukku Vanthutta	Savithiri (1980), Netrikkan (1981), Urangatha Ninaivugal (1983)
1980	Archana	Thai Ponggal	Rettai Vaal Kuruvi (1987), Veedu (1988), Seethakaathi (2018)
1980	Shobana	Mangala Nayagi	Enakkul Oruvan (1984), Siva (1989), Thalapathi (1991)
1981	Radha	Alaigal Oivathillai	Tik Tik Tik (1981), Thoongadhey Thambi Thoongadhey (1983), Muthal Mariyathai (1985)
1981	Poornima Bhagyaraj	Nenjil Oru Mull	Mundhanai Mudichu (1983), Thanga Magan (1983), Neengal Kettavai (1984)
1981	Nalini	Ranuva Veeran	Nooravathu Naal (1984), 24 Mani Neram (1984), Pillai Nila (1985)
1982	Sadhana	Hitler Umanath	Nenjathai Allitha (1984), Unnai Thedi Varuven (1985), My Dear Lisa (1987)
1982	Sulakshana	Thooral Ninnu Pochchu	Thoongathey Thambi Thoongathey (1983), Thambikku Entha Ooru (1984), Sindhu Bhairavi (1985)
1983	Ramya Krishnan	Vellai Manasu	Padayappa (1999), Panchathanthiram (2002), Baahubali (2015)
1983	Rohini	Ilamai Kaalangal	Thanthu Vitten Ennai (1991), Marupadiyum (1993), Magalir Mattum (1994)
1983	Revathi	Mann Vasanai	Mouna Ragam (1986), Thevar Magan (1992), Power Paandi (2017)
1983	Bhanupriya	Mella Pesungal	Chatriyan (1990), Azhagan (1991), Amaran (1992)
1983	Urvashi	Mundhanai Mudichu	Michael Madana Kama Rajan (1990), Magalir Mattum (1994), Siva Manasula Sakthi (2009)
1984	Monisha Unni	Paavayya (short film)	Pookkal Vidum Thudhu (1987), Moonravadhu Kaan (1993), Unna Nenachen Pattu Padichen (1992)
1985	Ranjini	Mudhal Mariyathai	Kadalora Kavithaigal (1986), Velicham (1987), Urimai Geetham (1988)
1985	Kalpana	Chinna Veedu	Sindhu Nathi Poo (1994), Sathi Leelavathi (1995), Dumm Dumm Dumm (2001)
1985	Nadhiya	Poove Poochudava	Uyire Unakkaga (1986), Rajathi Raja (1989), M. Kumaran S/O Mahalakshmi (2004)
1985	Jayashree	Thendrale Ennai Thodu	Manithanin Marupakkam (1986), Thirumathi Oru Vegumathi (1987), Vanna Kanavugal (1987)
1985	Seetha	Aan Paavam	Penmani Aval Kanmani (1988), Guru Sishyan (1988), Unnal Mudiyum Thambi (1988)
1986	Amala	Mythili Ennai Kaathali	Agni Natchathiram (1988), Sathya (1988), Vetri Vizha (1989)
1986	Rekha	Kadalora Kavithaigal	Punnagai Mannan (1986), En Bommukutty Ammavukku (1989), Roja Kootam (2002)
1986	Pallavi	Aruvadai Naal	Dharma Devathai (1986), Oorai Therinjikitten (1988), Vedikkai En Vadikkai (1990), Sahadevan Mahadevan (1988)
1986	Lissy	Vikram	Ananda Aradhanai (1987), Manasukkul Mathappu (1988), Pagalil Pournami (1990)
1987	Saranya	Nayakan	Vanakkam Vathiyare (1991), Em Magan (2006), Thenmerku Paruvakaatru (2010)
1987	Shantipriya	Enga Ooru Pattukaran	Rayilukku Neramachu (1988), Poovizhi Raja (1988), Sirayil Pootha Chinna Malar (1990)
1987	Rupini	Cooliekkaran	Manithan (1987), Raja Chinna Roja (1989), Michael Madana Kama Rajan (1990)
1988	Nirosha	Agni Natchathiram	Soora Samhaaram (1988), Inaindha Kaigal (1990), Vetri Padigal (1991)
1988	Gautami	Guru Sishyan	Apoorva Sagodharargal (1989), Raja Chinna Roja (1989), Dharma Durai (1991)
1988	Khushbu	Dharmathin Thalaivan	Chinna Thambi (1991), Nattamai (1994), Kolangal (1995)
1989	Kanaka	Karakattakaran	Athisaya Piravi (1990), Periya Kudumbam (1995), Katta Panchayathu (1996)
1989	Sithara	Pudhu Pudhu Arthangal	Pudhu Vasantham (1990), Archana IAS (1991), Padayappa (1999)

== 1990s ==
Year	Name	Debut film	Other notable films
1990	Meena	Oru Pudhiya Kadhai	Avvai Shanmugi (1996), Bharathi Kannamma (1997), Rhythm (2000)
1990	Aamani	Pudhiya Kaatru	Idhuthanda Sattam (1992), Honest Raj (1994), Pudhayal (1997)
1990	Easwari Rao	Kavithai Paadum Alaigal	Raman Abdullah (1997), Virumbugiren (2002), Kaala (2018)
1990	Aishwariyaa Bhaskaran	Nyayangal Jeyikkattum	Meera (1992), Ejamaan (1993), Suyamvaram (1999)
1990	Sivaranjani	Mr. Bharath	Thalaivasal (1992), Kalaignan (1993), Vandicholai Chinraasu (1994)
1990	Suman Ranganathan	Pudhu Paatu	Maanagara Kaaval (1991), Unnai Vaazhthi Paadugiren (1992), Mudhal Udhayam (1995)
1991	Mohini	Eeramana Rojave	Naan Pesa Ninaipathellam (1993), Vanaja Girija (1994), Thayagam (1996)
1991	Sukanya	Pudhu Nellu Pudhu Naathu	Walter Vetrivel (1993), Vandicholai Chinraasu (1994), Indian (1996)
1991	Kasthuri	Aatha Un Koyilile	Amaidhi Padai (1994), Indian (1996), Kaadhal Kavidhai (1998)
1991	Madhoo	Azhagan	Roja (1991), Gentleman (1993), Mr. Romeo (1996)
1991	Yuvarani	Thambi Oorukku Pudhusu	Senthoorapandi (1993), Baashha (1995), Pasumpon (1995)
1991	Heera Rajagopal	Idhayam	Nee Pathi Naan Pathi (1991), Thiruda Thiruda (1993), Kadhal Kottai (1996)
1992	Roja	Chembaruthi	Indhu (1994), Veera (1994), Unnidathil Ennai Koduthen (1998)
1992	Ranjitha	Nadodi Thendral	Walter Vetrivel (1993), Jai Hind (1994), Karnaa (1995)
1992	Keerthana	Naalaiya Theerpu	Suriyan Chandiran (1993), Pavithra (1994), Minor Mappillai (1996)
1993	Soundarya	Ponnumani	Arunachalam (1997), Kaathala Kaathala (1998), Chokka Thangam (2003)
1993	Sanghavi	Amaravathi	Coimbatore Mappillai (1996), Porkkaalam (1997), Nilaave Vaa (1998)
1993	Rambha	Uzhavan	Ullathai Allitha (1996), Arunachalam (1997), Kaathala Kaathala (1998)
1993	Priya Raman	Valli	Suryavamsam (1997), Pudhumai Pithan (1998), Chinna Raja (1999)
1994	Nagma	Kaadhalan	Baashha (1995), Love Birds (1996), Pistha (1997)
1994	Sangita	Sarigamapadani	Pullakuttikaran (1995), Poove Unakkaga (1996), Pongalo Pongal (1997)
1994	Rajashree	Karuththamma	Neela Kuyil (1995), Amman Kovil Vaasalile (1996), Sethu (1999)
1994	Maheswari	Karuththamma	Nesam (1997), Ullaasam (1997), Naam Iruvar Nammaku Iruvar (1998)
1995	Manisha Koirala	Bombay	Indian (1996), Mudhalvan (1999), Baba (2002)
1995	Suvaluxmi	Aasai	Gokulathil Seethai (1996), Love Today (1997), En Aasai Rasave (1998)
1995	Devayani	Thotta Chinungi	Kaadhal Kottai (1996), Bharathi (2000), Azhagi (2002)
1996	Raasi	Priyam	Love Today (1997), Periya Idathu Mappillai (1997), Rettai Jadai Vayasu (1997)
1996	Tabu	Kadhal Desam	Iruvar (2007), Kandukondain Kandukondain (2000), Snegithiye (2000)
1996	Anju Aravind	Poove Unakkaga	Enakkoru Magan Pirappan (1996), Arunachalam (1997), Vaanathaippola (2000)
1997	Kausalya	Kaalamellam Kadhal Vaazhga	Nerukku Ner (1997), Pooveli (1998), Vaanathaippola (2000)
1997	Kajol	Minsara Kanavu	Velaiilla Pattadhari 2(2017),Chekka Chivantha Vaanam(2018)
1997	Aishwarya Rai	Iruvar	Jeans (1998), Kandukondain Kandukondain (2000), Raavanan (2010), Ponniyin Selvan: I (2022), Ponniyin Selvan: II (2023)
1997	Simran	V. I. P.	Thullatha Manamum Thullum (1999), Vaalee (1999), Vaaranam Aayiram (2008)
1997	Shalini	Kaadhalukku Mariyadhai	Amarkkalam (1999), Kannukkul Nilavu (2000), Alaipayuthey (2000)
1997	Keerthi Reddy	Devathai	Jolly (1998), Iniyavale (1998), Ninaivirukkum Varai (1999)
1997	Sakshi Shivanand	Pudhayal	Maapillai Gounder (1997), Vaanchinathan (2001), Vedham (2001)
1998	Sangeetha	Bhagavath Singh	Pithamagan (2003), Dhanam (2008), Manmadan Ambu (2010)
1998	Vijayalakshmi	Poonthottam	Friends (2001), Yes Madam (2003), Boss Engira Bhaskaran (2010)
1998	Isha Koppikar	Kaadhal Kavithai	En Swasa Kaatre (1999), Nenjinile (1999), Narasimha (2001)
1998	Preetha Vijayakumar	Sandhippoma	Padayappa (1999), Suyamvaram (1999), Punnagai Desam (2002)
1999	Laila	Kallazhagar	Nandhaa (2001), Pithamagan (2003), Kanda Naal Mudhal (2005)
1999	Jyothika	Vaalee	Kushi (2000), Chandramukhi (2005), Mozhi (2007)
1999	Malavika	Unnai Thedi	Rojavanam (1999), Vetri Kodi Kattu (2000), Chandramukhi (2005)
1999	Mumtaj	Monisha En Monalisa	Kushi (2000), Chocolate (2001), London (2005)
1999	Vindhya	Sangamam	Kannukku Kannaga (2000), Charlie Chaplin (2002), Namma Veetu Kalyanam (2002)

== 2000s ==
Year	Name	Debut film	Notable films
2000	Pooja Kumar	Kadhal Rojavae	Vishwaroopam (2013), Uttama Villain (2015), Meen Kuzhambum Mann Paanaiyum (2016)
2000	Abhirami	Vaanavil	Samudhiram (2001), Virumaandi (2004), 36 Vayadhinile (2015)
2000	Sneha	Ennavale	Aanandham (2001), Unnai Ninaithu (2002), Vaseegara (2003)
2000	Kaveri	Kannukkul Nilavu	Samudhiram (2001), Punnagai Poove (2003), Kannadi Pookkal (2005)
2000	Divyaa Unni	Kannan Varuvaan	Sabhash (2000), Paalayathu Amman (2000), Vedham (2001)
2000	Shweta Menon	Snegithiye	Naan Avan Illai 2 (2009), Aravaan (2012), Thunai Mudhalvar (2015)
2001	Reema Sen	Minnale	Chellamae (2004), Vallavan (2006), Aayirathil Oruvan (2010)
2001	Monal Naval	Paarvai Ondre Pothume	Badri (2001), Lovely (2001), Samudhiram (2001)
2001	Bhumika Chawla	Badri	Roja Kootam (2002), Sillunu Oru Kaadhal (2006), Kannai Nambathey (2023)
2001	Richa Pallod	Shah Jahan	Alli Arjuna (2002), Kaadhal Kirukkan (2003), Unakkum Enakkum (2006)
2001	Sindhu Menon	Samudhiram	Kadal Pookal (2001), Youth (2002), Eeram (2009)
2001	Gayatri Jayaraman	Manadhai Thirudivittai	Shree (2002), April Maadhattil (2002), Vaseegara (2003)
2002	Kiran Rathod	Gemini	Anbe Sivam (2003), Winner (2003), Aambala (2016)
2002	Meera Jasmine	Run	Aaytha Ezhuthu (2004), Kasthuri Maan (2005), Sandakozhi (2005)
2002	Gajala	Ezhumalai	Raam (2005), Em Magan (2006), Durai (2008)
2002	Rathi	Solla Marandha Kadhai	Adi Thadi (2004), Gummalam (2002), Anbe Un Vasam (2003)
2002	Trisha Krishnan	Mounam Pesiyadhe	Saamy (2003), Ghilli (2004), Aaru (2005), Unakum Enakkum (2006), Abhiyum Naanum (2008), Vinnaithaandi Varuvaayaa (2010)
2002	Sridevi Vijaykumar	Kadhal Virus	Priyamaana Thozhi (2003), Thithikudhe (2003), Devathayai Kanden (2005)
2002	Kaniha	Five Star	Aethirree (2004), Autograph (2004), Varalaru (2006)
2002	Shrutika	Shree	Album (2002), Nala Damayanthi (2003), Thithikudhe (2003)
2002	Charmy Kaur	Kaadhal Azhivathillai	Kadhal Kisu Kisu (2003), Aahaa Ethanai Azhagu (2003), Laadam (2009)
2002	Sriya Reddy	Samurai	Thimiru (2006), Veyil (2006), Vedi (2011)
2002	Gayathri Raguram	Charlie Chaplin	Style (2002), Whistle (2003), Vikadan (2003)
2002	Priyanka Trivedi	Raajjiyam	Raja (2002), Kadhal Sadugudu (2003), Jananam (2004)
2002	Anitha Hassanandani	Varushamellam Vasantham	Samurai (2002), Sukran (2005), Nayagan (2008)
2003	Sherin	Thulluvadho Ilamai	Whistle (2003), Urchagam (2007), Nannbenda (2015)
2003	Sadha	Jayam	Anniyan (2005), Unnale Unnale (2007), Torchlight (2018)
2003	Sonia Agarwal	Kaadhal Kondein	7G Rainbow Colony (2004), Pudhupettai (2006), Thanimai (2019)
2003	Genelia D'Souza	Boys	Sachein (2005), Santosh Subramaniam (2008), Uthamaputhiran (2010)
2003	Nikita Thukral	Kurumbu	Chatrapathi (2004), Vetrivel Sakthivel (2005), Saroja (2008)
2003	Pooja Umashankar	Jay Jay	Ullam Ketkumae (2005), Naan Kadavul (2009), Vidiyum Munn (2013)
2003	Shriya Saran	Enakku 20 Unakku 18	Mazhai (2005), Thiruvilaiyaadal Aarambam (2006), Sivaji: The Boss (2007)
2003	Devadarshini	Parthiban Kanavu	Kaakha Kaakha (2003), Muni 2: Kanchana (2014), Ya Ya (2018)
2003	Chaya Singh	Thiruda Thirudi	Anandhapurathu Veedu (2010), Idhu Kathirvelan Kadhal (2014), Iravukku Aayiram Kangal (2018)
2003	Meera Vasudevan	Unnai Saranadainthen	Arivumani (2004), Aattanayagan (2010), Adanga Maru (2018)
2004	Namitha	Engal Anna	Englishkaran (2005), Naan Avanillai (2007), Billa (2007)
2004	Divya Spandana	Kuthu	Giri (2004), Varanam Aayiram (2008), Singam Puli (2010)
2004	Priyamani	Kangalal Kaidhu Sei	Paruthiveeran (2007), Malaikottai (2007), Ninaithale Inikkum (2009)
2004	Madhumitha	Kudaikul Mazhai	Englishkaran (2005), Arai En 305-il Kadavul (2008), Yogi (2009)
2004	Gopika	Autograph	Kana Kandaen (2005), Ponniyin Selvan (2005), Em Magan (2006)
2004	Sandhya	Kaadhal	Dishyum (2006), Vallavan (2006), Kannamoochi Yenada (2007)
2004	Asin	M. Kumaran S/O Mahalakshmi	Ghajini (2005), Pokkiri (2007), Dasavathaaram (2008), Kaavalan (2011)
2005	Nayanthara	Ayya	Raja Rani (2013), Naanum Rowdy Dhaan (2015), Aramm (2017),
2005	Nila	Anbe Aaruyire	Jambhavan (2006), Marudhamalai (2007), Lee (2007)
2005	Raai Laxmi	Karka Kasadara	Dhaam Dhoom (2008), Vaamanan (2009), Mankatha (2011)
2005	Padmapriya	Thavamai Thavamirundhu	Pattiyal (2006), Satham Podathey (2007), Pokkisham (2009)
2005	Saranya Mohan	Oru Naal Oru Kanavu	Yaaradi Nee Mohini (2008), Vennila Kabadi Kuzhu (2009), Velayudham (2011)
2006	Bhavana	Chithiram Pesuthadi	Veyil (2006), Deepavali (2007), Jayamkondaan (2008)
2006	Vimala Raman	Poi	Raman Thediya Seethai (2008), Iruttu (2019), Asvins (2023)
2006	Mamtha Mohandas	Sivappathigaram	Guru En Aalu (2009), Thadaiyara Thaakka (2012), Enemy (2021)
2006	Vedhika	Madrasi	Kaalai (2008), Paradesi (2013), Kaaviya Thalaivan (2014)
2006	Vasundhara Kashyap	Vattaram	Jayamkondaan (2008), Peraanmai (2009), Thenmerku Paruvakaatru (2010)
2006	Tamannaah	Kedi	Kalloori(2007)Ayan (2009),Kanden Kadhalai(2009),Padikkathavan(2009)Paiyaa (2010), ,Siruthai(2011),Veeram(2014)Dharma Durai, (2016),Devi(2016),Thozha(2016),Kanne Kalaimaane (2019),Jailer(2023),Aranmanai 4(2024)
2006	Anushka Shetty	Rendu	Vettaikkaran (2009), Deiva Thirumagal (2010), Irandaam Ulagam (2013)
2006	Regina Cassandra	Azhagiya Asura	Kedi Billa Killadi Ranga (2013), Rajathandhiram (2015), Maanagaram (2017)
2006	Kamalinee Mukherjee	Vettaiyaadu Vilaiyaadu	Kadhalna Summa Illai (2009), Iraivi (2016)
2007	Andrea Jeremiah	Pachaikili Muthucharam	Aayirathil Oruvan (2010), Vishwaroopam (2013), Taramani (2017)
2007	Vijayalakshmi Agathiyan	Chennai 600028	Anjathe (2008), Biryani (2013), Chennai 600028 II (2016)
2007	Anjali	Kattradhu Thamizh	Angadi Theru (2010), Engaeyum Eppothum (2011), Kalakalappu (2012)
2007	Aditi Rao Hydari	Sringaram	Kaatru Veliyidai (2017), Psycho (2020), Hey Sinamika (2022)
2008	Kajal Aggarwal	Pazhani	Maattrraan (2012), Thuppakki (2012), Vivegam (2017)
2008	Swathi Reddy	Subramaniapuram	Kanimozhi (2010), Poraali (2011), Idharkuthane Aasaipattai Balakumara (2013)
2008	Sameera Reddy	Vaaranam Aayiram	Aasal (2010), Vedi (2011), Vettai (2012)
2008	Piaa Bajpai	Poi Solla Porom	Aegan (2008), Goa (2010), Bale Pandiya (2010)
2008	Sunaina	Kadhalil Vizhunthen	Neerparavai (2012), Kaali (2018), Enai Noki Paayum Thota (2019)
2008	Parvathy	Poo	Chennaiyil Oru Naal (2013), Maryan (2013), Uttama Villain (2015)
2008	Poonam Bajwa	Seval	Kacheri Arambam Drohi (2010), Thambikottai (2011)
2008	Remya Nambeesan	Raman Thediya Seethai	Pizza (2012), Sethupathi (2016), Sathya (2017)
2008	Poorna	Muniyandi Vilangial Moonramandu	Drohi (2010), Aadu Puli (2011), Thagaraaru (2013)
2008	Kangana Ranaut	Dhaam Dhoom	Thalaivii (2021), Chandramukhi 2 (2023)
2008	Nivetha Thomas	Kuruvi	Poraali (2011), Naveena Saraswathi Sabatham (2013), Jilla (2014)
2008	Srithika	Mahesh, Saranya Matrum Palar	Vennila Kabadi Kuzhu (2009), Venghai (2011)
2009	Priya Anand	Vaamanan	Ethir Neechal (2013), Vanakkam Chennai (2013), Arima Nambi (2014)
2009	Anuya Bhagvath	Siva Manasula Sakthi	Madurai Sambavam (2009), Nagaram Marupakkam (2010), Naan (2012)
2009	Bindu Madhavi	Pokkisham	Veppam (2011), Kedi Billa Killadi Ranga (2013), Desingu Raja (2013)
2009	Misha Ghoshal	Pokkisham	Naan Mahaan Alla (2010), 7 Aum Arivu (2011), Raja Rani (2013)
2009	Sai Dhanshika	Peraanmai	Maanja Velu (2010), Paradesi (2013), Vizhithiru (2017)
2009	Swasika	Vaigai	Kandathum Kanathathum (2012), Lubber Pandhu (2024), Maaman (2025)
2009	Manochitra	Innoruvan	Aval Peyar Thamizharasi (2010), Veeram (2014), Netru Indru (2014)
2009	Arundhati	Vedappan	Kaala (2018), Namma Veettu Pillai (2019), Viruman (2022)
2009	Nandhini	Vennila Kabadi Kuzhu	Aranmanai 3 (2021), Vikram (2022), Viruman (2022)
2009	Ananya	Naadodigal	Engaeyum Eppothum (2011), Pulivaal (2014), Diesel (2025)
2009	Abhinaya	Naadodigal	Aayirathil Oruvan (2010), Veeram (2014), Thani Oruvan (2015)

== 2010s ==
Year	Name	Debut film	Other notable
2010	Amala Paul	Veerasekaran	Mynaa (2010), Kadhalil Sodhappuvadhu Yeppadi (2012), Aadai (2019)
2010	Amy Jakson	Madrasapattinam	I (2015), Thanga Magan (2015), Theri (2016)
2010	Shruthi Ramakrishnan	Sivappu Mazhai	Aanmai Thavarael (2011), 144 (2015), Narathan (2016)
2010	Aishwarya Rajesh	Neethana Avan	Kaaka Muttai (2015), Dharma Durai (2016), Kanaa (2018)
2010	Samantha	Vinnaithaandi Varuvaayaa	Neethaane En Ponvasantham (2012), Kaththi (2014), U Turn (2018)
2010	Vani Bhojan	Orr Eravuu	Oh My Kadavule (2020), Malaysia to Amnesia (2021), Raame Aandalum Raavane Aandalum (2021),
2010	Oviya	Kalavani	Kalakalappu (2012), Yaamirukka Bayamey (2014), 90ML (2019)
2010	Vidya Pradeep	Aval Peyar Thamizharasi	Saivam (2014), Pasanga 2 (2015), Thadam (2019)
2010	Chandini Tamilarasan	Siddhu +2	Naan Rajavaga Pogiren (2013), Vil Ambu (2016), Ennodu Vilayadu (2017)
2010	Srushti Dange	Kadhalagi	Vil Ambu (2016), Dharma Durai (2016), Mupparimanam (2017)
2010	Anumol	Kannukulle	Oru Naal Iravil (2015), Farhana (2023), Haraa (2024)
2011	Taapsee Pannu	Aadukalam	Vandhaan Vendraan (2011), Kanchana 2 (2015), Game Over (2019)
2011	Hansika Motwani	Mappillai	Engeyum Kadhal (2011), Oru Kal Oru Kannadi (2012), Maan Karate (2014)
2011	Shruti Haasan	7 Aum Arivu	3 (2012), Puli (2015), Vedalam (2015)
2011	Dhanya Balakrishna	7 Aum Arivu	Kadhalil Sodhappuvadhu Yeppadi (2012), Neethane En Ponvasantham (2012), Raja Rani (2013)
2011	Pooja Ramachandran	7 Aum Arivu	Kadhalil Sodhappuvadhu Yeppadi (2012), Nanban (2012), Nannbenda (2015)
2011	Nithya Menen	Nootrenbadhu	O Kadhal Kanmani (2015), Mersal (2017), Thiruchitrambalam (2022)
2011	Rakul Preet Singh	Yuvan	Yennamo Yedho (2014), Theeran Adhigaaram Ondru (2017), NGK (2019)
2011	Karthika Nair	Ko	Annakodi (2013), Purampokku Engira Podhuvudamai (2015)
2011	Janani	Avan Ivan	Thegidi (2014), Adhe Kangal (2017), Balloon (2017)
2011	Pranitha Subhash	Udhayan	Saguni (2012), Massu Engira Masilamani (2015), Enakku Vaaitha Adimaigal (2017)
2012	Radhika Apte	Dhoni	All in All Azhagu Raja (2013), Vetri Selvan (2014), Kabali (2016)
2012	Nandita Swetha	Attakathi	Ethir Neechal (2013), Idharkuthane Aasaipattai Balakumara (2013), Mundaasupatti (2014)
2012	Gayathrie	18 Vayasu	Naduvula Konjam Pakkatha Kaanom (2012), Rummy (2014), Seethakaathi (2018)
2012	Iswarya Menon	Kadhalil Sodhappuvadhu Yeppadi	Theeya Velai Seiyyanum Kumaru (2013), Tamizh Padam 2 (2018), Naan Sirithal (2020)
2012	Lakshmi Menon	Sundarapandian	Kumki (2012), Vedalam (2015), Miruthan (2016)
2012	Varalaxmi Sarathkumar	Podaa Podi	Vikram Vedha (2017), Sandakozhi 2 (2018), Sarkar (2018)
2012	Mahima Nambiar	Saattai	Kuttram 23 (2017), Kodiveeran (2017), Iravukku Aayiram Kangal (2018)
2012	Pooja Hegde	Mugamoodi	Beast (2022), Retro (2025), Jana Nayagan (2025)
2012	Archana Kavi	Aravaan	Gnana Kirukkan (2014)
2013	Nazriya Nazim	Raja Rani	Neram(2013), Vaayai Moodi Pesavum (2014), Thirumanam Enum Nikkah (2015)
2013	Sri Divya	Varuthapadatha Valibar Sangam	Jeeva (2014), Vellaikaara Durai (2014), Kaaki Sattai (2015)
2013	Riythvika	Paradesi	Madras (2014), Kabali (2016), Irandam Ulagaporin Kadaisi Gundu (2019)
2014	Malvika Nair	Cuckoo	
2014	Namitha Pramod	En Kaadhal Pudhithu	Nimir (2018), Aval Peyar Rajni (2023)
2014	Catherine Tresa	Madras	Kathakali (2016), Kanithan (2016), Kadamban (2017), Aruvam (2019)
2014	Sanchana Natarajan	Nerungi Vaa Muthamidathe	Irudhi Suttru (2016), Jigarthanda DoubleX (2023), Por (2024)
2014	Ashna Zaveri	Vallavanukku Pullum Aayudham	Inimey Ippadithan (2015), Meen Kuzhambum Mann Paanaiyum (2016), Nagesh Thiraiyarangam (2018)
2014	Miya	Amara Kaaviyam	Indru Netru Naalai (2015), Vetrivel (2016), Oru Naal Koothu (2016)
2014	Anandhi	Poriyaalan	Kayal (2014), Pariyerum Perumal (2018), Irandam Ulagaporin Kadaisi Gundu (2019)
2014	Sshivada	Nedunchaalai	Zero (2016), Adhey Kangal (2017), Theera Kaadhal (2023)
2014	Lavanya Tripathi	Bramman	Maayavan (2017), Thanal (2025)
2014	Hebah Patel	Thirumanam Enum Nikkah	Vallan (2025), Aadya (2026)
2014	Monal Gajjar	Sigaram Thodu	Vanavarayan Vallavarayan (2014)
2014	Anaika Soti	Kaaviya Thalaivan	Semma Botha Aagathey (2018), Parris Jeyaraj (2021), Plan Panni Pannanum (2021)
2014	Deepika Padukone	Kochadaiiyaan	
2015	Nikki Galrani	Darling	Yagavarayinum Naa Kaakka (2015), Ko 2 (2016), Velainu Vandhutta Vellaikaaran (2016)
2015	Keerthy Suresh	Idhu Enna Maayam	Rajinimurugan (2016), Thaanaa Serndha Koottam (2018), Sarkar (2018)
2015	Varsha Bollamma	Sathuran	'96 (2018), Bigil (2019), 13aam Number Veedu (2020)
2015	Ramya Pandian	Dummy Tappasu	Joker (2016), Aan Devathai (2018), Raame Aandalum Raavane Aandalum (2021)
2015	Aishwarya Dutta	Tamizhuku En Ondrai Azhuthavum	Paayum Puli (2015), Aarathu Sinam (2016), Sathriyan (2017)
2015	Pavithra Lakshmi	O Kadhal Kanmani	Naai Sekar (2022), Jigiri Dosthu (2023), Once Upon a Time in Madras (2024)
2015	Sreethu Krishnan	10 Endrathukulla	Rangoon (2017), Iruttu Araiyil Murattu Kuththu (2023), Once Upon a Time in Madras (2024)
2015	Reshma Pasupuleti	Masala Padam	Velainu Vandhutta Vellaikaaran (2016), Ko 2 (2016), Sathiya Sothanai (2023)
2016	Nikhila Vimal	Vetrivel	Kidaari (2016), Panjumittai (2018), Thambi (2019)
2016	Nivetha Pethuraj	Oru Naal Koothu	Podhuvaga En Manasu Thangam (2017), Tik Tik Tik (2018), Thimiru Pudichavan (2018)
2016	Manjima Mohan	Achcham Yenbadhu Madamaiyada	Sathriyan (2017), Tughlaq Durbar (2021), FIR (2022)
2016	Sheela Rajkumar	Aarathu Sinam	To Let (2017), Draupathi (2020), Mandela (2021)
2016	Ritika Singh	Irudhi Suttru	Aandavan Kattalai (2016), Shivalinga (2017), Oh My Kadavule (2020)
2016	Tanya Ravichandran	Bale Vellaiyathevaa	Karuppan (2017), Nenjukku Needhi (2022), Trigger (2022)
2016	Madonna Sebastian	Kadhalum Kadandhu Pogum	Kavan (2017), Pa. Pandi (2017), Junga (2018)
2016	Anupama Parameswaran	Kodi	Thalli Pogathey (2021), Siren (2024), Dragon (2025)
2016	Eesha Rebba	Oyee	Rendagam (2022), Nitham Oru Vaanam (2022)
2016	Pujita Ponnada	Thozha	Jolly O Gymkhana (2024), Desingu Raja 2 (2025), Padaiyaanda Maaveeraa (2025)
2016	Yashika	Dhuruvangal Pathinaaru	NOTA (2018), Zombie (2019), The Legend (2022
2016	Anjana Jayaprakash	Dhuruvangal Pathinaaru	Achcham Madam Naanam Payirppu (2022)
2017	Shraddha Srinath	Kaatru Veliyidai	Vikram Vedha (2017), Nerkonda Paarvai (2019), Maara (2021)
2017	Sayyeshaa	Vanamagan	Kadaikutty Singam (2018), Kaappaan (2019), Teddy (2021)
2017	Aparna Balamurali	8 Thottakkal	Sarvam Thaala Mayam (2019), Soorarai Pottru (2020), Theethum Nandrum (2021)
2017	Priya Bhavani Shankar	Meyaadha Maan	Kadaikutty Singam (2018), Monster (2019), Thiruchitrambalam (2022)
2017	Indhuja Ravichandran	Meyaadha Maan	Mercury (2018), Magamuni (2019), Bigil (2019)
2017	Athulya Ravi	Kadhal Kan Kattudhe	Capmaari (2019), Naadodigal 2 (2020), Murungakkai Chips (2021)
2017	Arthana Binu	Thondan	Semma (2018), Kadaikutty Singam (2018), Vennila Kabaddi Kuzhu 2 (2019)
2017	Ritu Varma	Velaiilla Pattadhari 2	Kannum Kannum Kollaiyadithaal (2020), Nitham Oru Vaanam (2022), Mark Anthony (2023)
2017	Aathmika	Meesaiya Murukku	Kodiyil Oruvan (2021), Kaatteri (2022), Thiruvin Kural (2023)
2017	Ammu Abhirami	Bairavaa	Ratsasan (2018), Asuran (2019), Nirangal Moondru (2023)
2017	Ruhani Sharma	Kadaisi Bench Karthi	Mask (2025)
2017	Anu Emmanuel	Thupparivaalan	Namma Veettu Pillai (2019), Japan (2023)
2017	Mehreen Pirzada	Nenjil Thunivirundhal	NOTA (2018), Pattas (2020), Indra (2025)
2017	Vaibhavi Shandilya	Sakka Podu Podu Raja	Iruttu Araiyil Murattu Kuththu (2018), Capmaari (2019)
2017	Akshara Haasan	Vivegam	Kadaram Kondan (2018), Achcham Madam Naanam Payirppu (2022)
2018	Ivana	Naachiyaar	Hero (2019), Love Today (2022), LGM: Let's Get Married (2023)
2018	Raashi Khanna	Imaikkaa Nodigal	Adanga Maru (2018), Tughlaq Durbar (2021), Aranmanai 3 (2021)
2018	Amritha Aiyer	Padaiveeran	Kaali (2018), Bigil (2019), Lift (2021)
2018	Huma Qureshi	Kaala	Valimai(2022)
2018	Reba Monica John	Jarugandi	Bigil (2019), Dhanusu Raasi Neyargale (2019), FIR (2022)
2018	Sai Pallavi	Diya	Maari 2 (2018), NGK (2019), Amaran (2024)
2018	Raiza Wilson	Pyaar Prema Kaadhal	FIR (2022), Coffee With Kaadhal (2022), Karungaapiyam (2023)
2018	Roshni Prakash	Yemaali	Jada (2019), Dhonima (2024), Vanangaan (2025)
2018	Samyuktha	Kalari	July Kaatril (2019), Erida (2021), Vaathi (2023)
2019	Megha Akash	Petta	Vantha Rajavathaan Varuven (2019), Boomerang (2019), Enai Noki Paayum Thota (2019)
2019	Malavika Mohanan	Petta	Master (2021), Maaran (2022), Thangalaan (2023)
2019	Manju Warrier	Asuran	Thunivu (2023), Vettaiyan (2024), Viduthalai Part 2 (2024)
2019	Lijomol Jose	Sivappu Manjal Pachai	Theethum Nandrum (2021), Jai Bhim (2021), Putham Pudhu Kaalai Vidiyaadhaa (2022)
2019	Kashmira Pardeshi	Sivappu Manjal Pachai	Anbarivu (2022), Varalaru Mukkiyam (2022), Vasantha Mullai (2023)
2019	Dushara Vijayan	Bodhai Yeri Budhi Maari	Sarpatta Parambarai (2021), Natchathiram Nagargiradhu (2022), Aneethi (2023)
2019	Mirnalini Ravi	Super Deluxe	Champion (2019), Enemy (2021), Jango (2021)
2019	Keerthi Pandian	Thumbaa	Anbirkiniyal (2021), Kannagi (2023), Blue Star (2024)
2019	Tanya Hope	Thadam	Dharala Prabhu (2020), Kulasami (2023), Kick (2023)
2019	Samyuktha Hegde	Watchman	Comali (2019), Puppy (2019), Theal (2022)
2019	Aishwarya Lekshmi	Action	Gatta Kusthi (2022), Captain (2022), Ponniyin Selvan: I (2022), Ponniyin Selvan: II (2022)
2019	Kalyani Priyadarshan	Hero	Putham Pudhu Kaalai (2020), Maanaadu (2021), Genie (2024)
2019	Ashima Narwal	Kolaigaran	Rajabheema (2025)

== 2020s ==
Year	Name	Debut film	Other notable films
2020	Bhavani Sre	Ka Pae Ranasingam	Viduthalai Part 1 (2023), Viduthalai Part 2 (2024)
2021	Priyanka Arul Mohan	Doctor	Don (2022), Etharkkum Thunindhavan (2022), Captain Miller (2024)
2021	Rajisha Vijayan	Karnan	Jai Bhim (2021), Sardar (2022), Bison (2025)
2021	Rashmika Mandanna	Sulthan	Varisu (2023), Kuberaa (2025)
2021	Abarnathi	Thaen	Jail (2021), Udanpaal (2022), Irugapatru (2023)
2021	Nidhhi Agerwal	Eeswaran	Bhoomi (2021), Kalaga Thalaivan (2022)
2021	Dharsha Gupta	Rudra Thandavam	Oh My Ghost (2022), Medical Miracle (2026)
2021	Shivathmika Rajashekar	Anandham Vilayadum Veedu	Nitham Oru Vaanam (2022)
2022	Shivani Rajashekar	Anbarivu	Nenjuku Needhi (2022)
2022	Shivani Narayanan	Vikram	Veetla Vishesham (2022), Naai Sekar Returns (2022), Bumper (2023)
2022	Aditi Shankar	Viruman	Maaveeran (2023), Nesippaya (2025)
2022	Krithi Shetty	The Warriorr	Custody (2023), Love Insurance Kompany (2025)
2022	Sobhita Dhulipala	Ponniyin Selvan: I	Ponniyin Selvan: II(2023)
2022	Sara Arjun	Ponniyin Selvan: I	Ponniyin Selvan: II(2023)
2022	Chaitra Reddy	Valimai	Vishamakaran (2022)
2022	Ashika Ranganath	Pattathu Arasan	Miss You (2024), Sardar 2 (2026)
2023	Nimisha Sajayan	Chithha	Jigarthanda DoubleX (2023), Mission: Chapter 1 (2024), DNA (2025)
2023	Preethi Asrani	Ayothi	Election (2024), Kiss (2025)
2023	Meenakshi Chaudhary	Kolai	Singapore Saloon (2024), The Greatest of All Time (2024), Lucky Baskhar (2024)
2024	Mamitha Baiju	Rebel	Dude (2025), Jana Nayagan (2026)
2024	Preity Mukhundhan	Star	Blast, Idhayam Murali
2024	Sanjana Krishnamoorthy	Lubber Pandhu	Parimala and Co, DC
2024	Disha Patani	Kanguva	
2025	Rukmini Vasanth	Ace	Madharaasi (2025)
2025	Priya Prakash Varrier	Nilavuku En Mel Ennadi Kobam	Good Bad Ugly (2025)
2025	Saanve Megghana	Kudumbasthan	Pyaar Prema Kalyanam
2025	Bhagyashri Borse	Kaantha	Seyon
2025	Kayadu Lohar	Dragon	Idhayam Murali, I'm Game, Immortal
2026	Sreeleela	Parasakthi	Om
2026	Wamiqa Gabbi	DC	Genie
2026	Samyuktha Viswanathan	Double Occupancy	I'm Game, Mr. Bhaarath
2026	Ketika Sharma	Meesaya Murukku 2	

== See also ==
- Tamil cinema
- List of Indian film actresses
- List of Hindi film actresses
- List of Kannada film actresses
- List of Telugu film actresses
