= Rajaji (actor) =

Indian actor

- Other names: Rajaj
- Known for: 2011–present
- Notable work: Moodar Koodam (2013).

Rajaji Manickam (formerly Rajaj) is an Indian actor who works in Tamil-language films. He is known for his collaborations with Naveen including Moodar Koodam (2013).

== Career ==
Rajaji knew Naveen through a schoolmate and was his roommate when he was in Chennai. Both Naveen and him made their lead debut through Moodar Koodam (2013). His next film was Sathuran (2015), which featured him in the role of an auto driver. The reason the director cast him in the role was that he felt that he fit the role and the audience would be unable to guess his next move as opposed to casting a popular actor. In Engitta Modhathey (2017), he played a Kamal Haasan fan while Natrajan Subramaniam played a rival Rajinikanth fan. Since he wasn't able to imitate Kamal Haasan's acting, he used the actor's mannerisms in his character. Regarding his performance, a critic wrote, "Rajaji has a less prominent role to play, given how much screen time Natraj receives. His performance during the first half though nearly matches Natraj on every move".

Dhanaram Saravanan, who worked as an associate director for Moodar Koodam, made his directorial debut with Kolanji (2019), which marked Rajaji's second collaboration with Naveen. A critic opined that the romantic track featuring him testing the audience's patience. Regarding his performance in the film Koorman (2022) co-starring Janani, a critic noted, "Coming to the performances, Rajaji, despite his earnestness, isn't really up to the mark. [...] But Rajaji is found wanting in scenes that demand him to emote loud". Another critic noted, "A complex role that has been pulled up well by him".

He collaborated with Ramu Chellappa, the director of Enkitta Mothathe again, for Tik Tok (2023), which received a low key release but was in the news when actress Priyanka Mohan intervened and removed her intimate scenes from the film.

== Filmography ==
Year	Title	Role	Notes
2011	Ko	Dina Anjal employee	credited as Rajaj
2013	Moodar Koodam	Vellaichami (White)	credited as Rajaj
2015	Sathuran	Dheena	credited as Rajaj
2017	Engitta Modhathey	Nallaperumal	credited as Rajaj
2019	Kolanji	Gemini	credited as Rajaj
2022	Koorman	Dhana	
2023	Tik Tok	Vikki, Altap/Anand	Dual roles
2024	Once Upon a Time in Madras	Jothi	
