= Natarajan Sankaran =

- Origin: Tirunelveli, Tamil Nadu, India
- Genre: Film score
- Occupations: Film composer music director
- Instruments: keyboard, piano, vocal
- Years active: 2013–present

Natarajan Sankaran is an Indian film composer and musician in the Tamil film industry. He made his debut as a film composer in the 2013 Tamil film Moodar Koodam. His works in later films including Oru Kanniyum Moonu Kalavaniyum and Kappal were critically acclaimed.

== Early life ==
Natarajan Sankaran was born in Tirunelveli, Tamil Nadu to a Tamil family. His father Sankaran is an electrical engineer and his mother, Sundari, is a housewife. He began his career as a mechanical engineer and worked in EID Parry and GlaxoSmithKline, Delhi. He resigned the job to pursue his career as a music director. He is trained in piano from Musee Musical, which is affiliated to Trinity College, London.

== Career ==
In 2011, Sankaran got his first opportunity to compose music for Moodar Koodam through his friend and long-time industry associate Naveen, who was the director and an actor of the movie. Naveen offered him to compose five songs for Moodar Koodam. His score won critical acclaim and fetched him the opportunity from leading director Chimbu Deven for his Arulnithi-starrer Oru Kanniyum Moonu Kalavaanikalum. He got an opportunity from Karthik G. Krish's Kappal. His score won critical acclaim. Kappal's were part of the top five in Radio Mirchi for six weeks, top 10 in Sooriyan FM, and held 2nd place in the iTunes chart for two weeks. The song Kadhal Cassatta became the most favorite song in all stations.

== Discography ==
| Year | Title | Notes |
|---|---|---|
| 2013 | Moodar Koodam | |
| 2014 | Oru Kanniyum Moonu Kalavaniyum | |
| 2014 | Kappal | |
| 2017 | Engitta Modhathey | |
| 2018 | Evanukku Engeyo Matcham Irukku | |
| 2019 | Kalavani 2 | Composed score |
| 2019 | Kolanji | |
| Upcoming | Alaudhinin Arputha Camera | |
| Upcoming | Agni Siragugal | |
