= Tik Tok (2023 film) =

Indian horror film

- Directed by: Mathanakumar
- Screenplay by: Mathanakumar
- Story by: Ramu Chellappa
- Produced by: Mathanakumar
- Starring: Rajaji Manickam; Priyanka Mohan; Sushma Raj; Muruganandham
- Cinematography: Tony Chan; Murugan Chellappa
- Edited by: Rajesh Selvaraj
- Music by: Sebastin Rozario; A. K. Rishal Sai
- Production company: MK Entertainment
- Distributed by: DSR Films
- Release date: 23 December 2023
- Country: India
- Language: Tamil
- Budget: ₹3.5 crore

Tik Tok is a 2023 Indian Tamil-language horror film directed by Mathanakumar and starring Rajaji Manickam, Priyanka Mohan, Sushma Raj and Muruganandham.

== Cast ==
- Rajaji Manickam as Vikki and Altap/Anand
- Priyanka Mohan as Keerthana
- Sushma Raj
- Muruganandham as Chakram
- Madhusudhan Rao as Keerthana's father
- Namo Narayana
- Chaams
- Saravana Sakthi
- Vinodhini Vaidyanathan as Susan
- Sanjana Singh as Prostitute
- Florent Pereira as KK

== Production ==
The film began production in 2017 and was to mark the debut of Priyanka Mohan. Ramu Chellappa, the director of Engitta Modhathey (2017), wrote the story for the film. The film was shot in haunted house set in Coimbatore in 2018 for several days. The delay of the film meant that the film was promoted as a Priyanka Mohan starrer although Sushma Raj had more screentime. Ratsasan-fame San Lokesh was initially supposed the be the editor of the film.

== Soundtrack ==
All music is composed by Sebastin Rozario and A. K. Rishal Sai.

Track listing
| No. | Title | Lyrics | Music | Singer(s) | Length |
|---|---|---|---|---|---|
| 1. | "Evanda Sonna Mamu" | Mathanakumar | A. K. Rishal Sai | A. K. Rishal Sai |
| 2. | "Thooridatho" | Ahamed Shyam | Sebastin Rozario |
| 3. | "Madi Oonjal" | Ahamed Shyam | Sebastin Rozario |

== Reception ==
A critic from Maalai Malar wrote that it is a pity that the first half is exciting and the second half is dull. The critic added that the director could have paid a little more attention to the screenplay.

== Controversy ==
After realising that a portion of the film was removed, the producer subsequently filed a police complaint in an attempt to regain his lost money from the film's failure. Priyanka Mohan reportedly approached DSR Films to have 20 minutes of her scenes removed, including bedroom scenes and two songs with intimate love scenes, since it will affect her family audience image. However, the producer himself wasn't informed and he felt the film underperformed due to this.

== Home media ==
The film was made available on the director's YouTube channel in 2024.
