= Oru Kanniyum Moonu Kalavaanikalum =

2014 Indian film by Chimbu Deven

- Directed by: Chimbu Deven
- Written by: Chimbu Deven
- Produced by: M. K. Tamilarasu
- Starring: Arulnithi; Bindu Madhavi; Ashrita Shetty; Bagavathi Perumal
- Cinematography: S. R. Kathir
- Edited by: Raja Mohammed
- Music by: Natarajan Sankaran
- Production company: Mohana Movies
- Distributed by: JSK Film Corporation
- Release date: 4 April 2014
- Running time: 135 minute
- Country: India
- Language: Tamil

Oru Kanniyum Moonu Kalavaanikalum (transl. A virgin and three thieves) is a 2014 Indian Tamil-language magic realism comedy film written and directed by Chimbu Deven, starring Arulnithi, Bindu Madhavi, Ashrita Shetty and Bagavathi Perumal. The music comprises three tracks composed by Sankaran Natarajan, while S. R. Kathir handles the camera. The film was shot in Chennai, in and around Saidapet, Anna Nagar, Besant Nagar and Royapuram. The theme of this film was inspired by the 1998 film Run Lola Run, which Chimbudevan acknowledges in the end credits.

== Plot ==
The film begins with Naradar trying to meet lord Brahma. He meets Brahma just in time as Brahma informs Naradar that he would have vanished if Naradar was late by a minute. Naradar opposes this, saying that Naradar meeting Brahma is bound to happen by fate no matter, if late by a minute as it is already written in fate. Brahma opposes this, and they both get into an argument. They go to Lord Shiva for settling this. Shiva informs Naradar that the fate of humans gets changed every minute. Naradar challenge Shiva to prove this. Shiva shows a screen consisting of human faces and asks Naradar to choose one. Naradar chooses Tamil, the hero of this film.

During the credits, Lord Shiva tells Naradar that he would now demonstrate the fate of Tamil changes upon time and the film unfolds into the main picture.

== Cast ==
- Arulnithi as Tamil
- Bindu Madhavi as Malar
- Ashrita Shetty as Isabella
- Bagavathi Perumal as Ramanujam Esakki
- Nassar as Hippy Lahiri
- M. S. Bhaskar
- Karthik Sabesh as Isaac
- Jayaprakash as Subhash
- Aadukalam Naren as Narasimhan
- V. S. Raghavan
- Delhi Ganesh
- Ravi Raghavendra
- Manobala as Chettan
- Pandu
- Mohan V. Raman as Kundizhakesi
- Sriranjani as Ponnamma
- George Maryan as Michael Azhagusundaram
- Aruldoss as Traffic Cop
- Crane Manohar as Vatti
- Scissor Manohar as Suddalai
- Jasper
- Latha Rao as Aunty
- Abhyudaya Gupta as Dr. Navneet
- Arun Bharadwaj as Chakravarthy
- Parotta Murugesan
- Jayaram as God (Cameo Appearance)

== Production ==
After the release of his previous directorial Irumbu Kottai Murattu Singam, Chimbudevan announced that his next film’s title would be Mareesan with Dhanush playing the lead role. However, the project was shelved due to budget constraints.

== Critical reception ==
Baradwaj Rangan wrote, "As much as we want to laud the ambition that results in something like Oru Kanniyum being attempted in Tamil, we also realise that these films are inherently compromised by Tamil-cinema considerations — the inevitability of the interval, the fear of things getting too serious, and the need to pad out the narrative to nearly two-and-a-half hours. The Times of India gave the film 3.5 stars out of 5 and wrote, "The first hour of OKMK is a terrific, nail-biting black comedy cum thriller. But, suddenly, the fizz goes away from the film as we are shown reiterations of the same set of circumstances playing out differently. And, for a film that is all about the value of time, the director takes a rather longer time to tell this story".

Sify wrote, "Chimbudevan is imaginative and this film is sure to appeal to someone seeking a refreshing change. Chimbudevan’s script and Arulnithi’s cool performance is what makes the film work". Rediff.com gave it 2.5 stars out of 5 and wrote, "Oru Kanniyum Moonu Kalavaanikalum is in Chimbu Deven’s trademark style, filled with quirky characters, fantastical elements, and loads of comedy and satire. The film is not your average run-of-the-mill romantic comedy and may not appeal to all, but the director does deserve credit for attempting a different concept".

Critics pointed out that the film resembled the German film Run Lola Run by Tom Tykwer. Chimbu Deven has also acknowledged the film in the end credits.

== Soundtrack ==
Oru Kanniyum Moonu Kalavaanikalum

Soundtrack album by Natarajan Sankaran
- Released: 2014
- Recorded: 2014
- Genre: Feature film soundtrack

Natarajan Sankaran chronology
Moodar Koodam (2013)	Oru Kanniyum Moonu Kalavaanikalum (2014)	Kappal (2014)

The music is composed by Natarajan Sankaran.

- "July Madham" - Naresh Iyer
- "Moonu Kodi" - Manikka Vinayagam, Chinnaponnu
- "Bachelor Enakke" - Gaana Bala, Premgi Amaren
- "Theme Breeze"
- "Theme Marriage"
- "Theme Thunder"

== See also ==
- List of films featuring time loops
