= Evanukku Engeyo Matcham Irukku =

2018 film by A. R. Mukesh

- Theatrical release poster
- Directed by: A. R. Mukesh
- Story by: Praveen Sattaru
- Based on: Guntur Talkies by Praveen Sattaru
- Produced by: Sharmiela Mandre
- Starring: Vimal; Ashna Zaveri
- Cinematography: Gopi Jagadeeswaran
- Edited by: P. Dinesh
- Music by: Natarajan Sankaran
- Production company: Sai Productions
- Distributed by: Lotus Five Star
- Release date: 7 December 2018
- Running time: 125 minutes
- Country: India
- Language: Tamil

Evanukku Engeyo Matcham Irukku (transl. He has a mole somewhere) is a 2018 Indian Tamil-language adult comedy film directed by Mukesh and produced by Sharmiela Mandre. The film stars Vimal and Ashna Zaveri, with Singampuli, Anandaraj, Poorna, and Mansoor Ali Khan in supporting roles. The music was composed by Natarajan Sankaran with cinematography by Gopi Jagadeeswaran and editing by P. Dinesh. A remake of the Telugu film Guntur Talkies (2016), the film was released on 7 December 2018.

== Plot ==
Hari (Vimal) and Giri (Singampuli) are colleagues who work together in a pharmacy. In the night, they become robbers but steal only petty things. However, they land in trouble by going beyond their limits. Soon, both partners in crime gets chased by Sub-Inspector Geetha (Poorna), gangster Annachi (Anandaraj), and Revolver Rani (Miya Rai), a horny NRI who wants Hari. Above all, the family of Hari's lover Surekha (Ashna Zaveri) also wants to wallop him. The rest of the film is all about how both Hari and Giri come out of all the trouble.

== Cast ==
- Vimal as Hari
- Ashna Zaveri as Surekha
- Singampuli as Giri
- Anandaraj as Anna-chi
- Poorna as SI Geetha
- Mansoor Ali Khan as Sengalvaraayan
- Miya Rai Leone as Revolver Rani, NRI
- Snigdha
- Aathma Patrick as Annachi's right-hand
- K. Rajendran
- Vetrivel Raja
- Lokesh
- Kadhal Kandhas
- Sujatha
- Sai Madhavi
- Sai Priya
- Mahi Sarna

== Production ==
A remake of the Telugu adult crime comedy Guntur Talkies (2016), the film was picked up by Kannada actress Sharmiela Mandre, who wanted to produce the film as a display of gratitude for director Mukesh, who had introduced her as an actress with Sajni (2007).

The film was partially shot in London during mid-2018, where scenes featuring Vimal, Ashna and British-Punjabi actress Mahi Sarna were shot. The rest of the film was shot in Chennai and Theni.

== Soundtrack ==
The soundtrack was composed by Natarajan Sankaran.

Evanukku Engeyo Matcham Irukku

Soundtrack album by Natarajan Sankaran
- Released: 2018
- Genre: Feature film soundtrack
- Producer: Natarajan Sankaran

Natarajan Sankaran chronology
Engitta Modhathey (2017)	Evanukku Engeyo Matcham Irukku (2018)	Kolanji (2019)

- "Evanukku Engeyo" – Sharanya Gopinath
- "O Surekha" – M. M. Manasi
- "Pazhaya Pattu" – Santhosh Hariharan, Natarajan Sankaran
- "Alai Alai" – Deepak, Keerthana
- "Mogam Chinna" – Padmalatha
- "Ye Pulli" – Jagadish

== Critical reception ==
Times of India rated 2 out of 5 "..being an unabashed adult comedy. The adult part of it, [..] is problematic... [..] but because of the sloppy writing." Cinema Express called it "offensive, disastrous attempt at an adult comedy".
