= 8th Vijay Awards =

Indian film awards ceremony in 2014

- Awarded for: "Excellence for cinematic achievements in Tamil cinema"
- Sponsored by: Gionee India
- Date: 5 July 2014
- Location: Chennai, Tamil Nadu
- Country: India
- Presented by: Gionee India; STAR Vijay
- Hosted by: Dhivyadharshini; Gobinath
- Acts: Shruthi Haasan; Vaani Kapoor; Anirudh Ravichander; Hansika Motwani; Lakshmi Rai
- Reward: Statuette
- First award: 2006

Highlights
- Most awards: Kadal (6)
- Most nominations: Vishwaroopam (16); Raja Rani (15)
- Website: www.vijayawards.in

Television/radio coverage
- Network: Star Vijay

The 8th Vijay Awards ceremony, honouring the best of the Tamil film industry in 2013, was held on 5 July 2014 at Chennai. The event was hosted by Gopinath and Divyadharshini.

== Jury ==
The jury members were director Prathap K. Pothan, cinematographer Ravi K. Chandran, and actor Yugi Sethu.

== Winners and nominees ==
=== Jury awards ===
Best Film	Best Director
Thanga Meenkal; Haridas; Paradesi; Soodhu Kavvum; Thalaimuraigal	Bala – Paradesi; Balu Mahendra – Thalaimuraigal; Kamal Haasan – Vishwaroopam; Suseenthiran – Pandiya Naadu; Ram – Thanga Meenkal
Best Actor	Best Actress
Kamal Haasan – Vishwaroopam; Atharvaa – Paradesi; Dhanush – Maryan; Vijay Sethupathi – Soodhu Kavvum; Vishal – Pandiya Naadu	Nayantara – Raja Rani; Parvathy – Maryan; Pooja Umashankar – Vidiyum Munn; Sneha – Haridas; Vedhicka – Paradesi
Best Supporting Actor	Best Supporting Actress
Bharathiraja – Pandiya Naadu; Arvind Swamy – Kadal; Karunakaran – Soodhu Kavvum; Sathyaraj – Raja Rani; Simha – Neram	Dhansika – Paradesi; Nandita Swetha – Ethir Neechal; Andrea Jeremiah – Vishwaroopam; Tulasi – Aadhalal Kadhal Seiveer; Viji Chandrasekhar – Madha Yaanai Koottam
Best Comedian	Best Villain
Santhanam – Theeya Velai Seiyyanum Kumaru; Power Star Srinivasan – Kanna Laddu Thinna Aasaiya; Sathish – Ethir Neechal; Soori – Varuthapadatha Valibar Sangam; Vivek – Singam II	Arjun – Kadal; Rahul Bose – Vishwaroopam; Sharath Lohitashwa – Pandiya Naadu; Vamsi Krishna – Ivan Veramathiri; Yog Japee – Soodhu Kavvum
Best Debut Actor	Best Debut Actress
Gautham Karthik – Kadal; Ashok Selvan – Pizza II: Villa; Sundeep Kishan – Yaaruda Mahesh; Nivin Pauly – Neram; Sathya – Puthagam	Nazriya Nazim – Neram; Aishwarya Arjun – Pattathu Yaanai; Sri Divya – Varuthapadatha Valibar Sangam; Surabhi – Ivan Veramathiri; Thulasi Nair – Kadal
Best Music Director	Best Cinematographer
A. R. Rahman – Kadal; Anirudh Ravichander – Ethir Neechal; D. Imman – Varuthapadatha Valibar Sangam; G. V. Prakash Kumar – Raja Rani; Santhosh Narayanan – Soodhu Kavvum	Rajiv Menon – Kadal; Chezhiyan – Paradesi; George C. Williams – Raja Rani; Marc Koninckx – Maryan; Sanu John Varghese – Vishwaroopam
Best Editor	Best Art Director
Anthony – Pandiya Naadu; Anthony L. Ruben – Raja Rani; Gopinath – Onaayum Aattukkuttiyum; Leo John Paul – Soodhu Kavvum; Mahesh Narayanan – Vishwaroopam	Lalgudi N. Ilaiyaraja & Thor – Vishwaroopam; C. S. Balachandar – Paradesi; T. Muthuraj – Raja Rani; Rajeevan – Pandiya Naadu; Selvakumar – Vanakkam Chennai
Best Male Playback Singer	Best Female Playback Singer
Yuvan Shankar Raja – "Kadal Raasa" (Maryan); A. R. Rahman – "Nenjae Ezhu" (Maryan); Shankar Mahadevan, Kamal Haasan – "Unnai Kaanadhu Naan" (Vishwaroopam); Sid Sriram – "Adiye" (Kadal); Sriram Parthasarathy – "Aanandha Yaazhai" (Thanga Meenkal)	Shakthisree Gopalan – "Nenjukulle" (Kadal); Andrea Jeremiah – "Mama Douser" (Soodhu Kavvum); Harini – "Moongil Thottam" (Kadal); Shweta Mohan – "Innum Konjam" (Maryan); Vandana Srinivasan – "Avatha Paiyya" (Paradesi)
Best Lyricist	Best Story, Screenplay Writer
Na. Muthukumar – "Dheivangal Ellam" (Kedi Billa Killadi Ranga); Kabilan, A. R. Rahman – "Innum Konja Neram" (Maryan); Madhan Karky – "Mannadacha Pandhu" (Gouravam); Vaali – "Ethir Neechal Adi" (Ethir Neechal); Vairamuthu – "Nenjukkule" (Kadal)	Nalan Kumarasamy – Soodhu Kavvum; Alphonse Putharen – Neram; Atlee – Raja Rani; Lenin Bharathi, Suseenthiran – Aadhalal Kadhal Seiveer; Naveen – Moodar Koodam
Best Background Score	Best Dialogue
Santhosh Narayanan – Soodhu Kavvum; A. R. Rahman – Maryan; G. V. Prakash Kumar – Raja Rani; Ilaiyaraaja – Onaayum Aattukkuttiyum; Tubby Parik – Vishwaroopam	Naveen – Moodar Koodam; Atlee – Raja Rani; Baskar Sakthi, Suseenthiran – Pandiya Naadu; Gokul, Madhan Karky – Idharkuthane Aasaipattai Balakumara; Nalan Kumarasamy – Soodhu Kavvum
Best Choreographer	Best Stunt Director
Brinda – "Adiyae" (Kadal); Baba Bhaskar – "Local Boys" (Ethir Neechal); Pandit Birju Maharaj – "Unnai Kaanadhu Naan" (Vishwaroopam); Sheriff – "Kasu Panam" (Soodhu Kavvum); Sridhar – "Tamizh Pasanga" (Thalaiva)	Anal Arasu – Pandiya Naadu; Anal Arasu, Rocky Rajesh – Singam II; Billa Jagan – Onaayum Aattukkuttiyum; Kecha Khamphakdee, Lee Whittaker, Parvez Feroz & T. Ramesh – Vishwaroopam; Rajasekhar – Ivan Veramathiri
Best Make Up	Best Costume Designer
Dasarathan – Paradesi; Albert Chettiyar, Avinash, Bujji Babu, Ramachandran, Ramu & Shanmugam – Raja Rani; Gage Hubard & Ralis Khan – Vishwaroopam; Irma Dataushvali, Mohideen Kumar, Nicky Rajani, Ramachandran & Ratan Gupta – Irandam Ulagam; Ramesh Mohanty, Thomas Van Der Nest – Maryan	Perumal Selvam & Poornima Ramaswamy – Paradesi; Chaitanya Rao, Deepali Noor, Kaviza Raebhela & Sathya – Raja Rani; Chaitanya Rao, Nikhila Sukumar & Malinipriya – Endrendrum Punnagai; Deepali Noor – Irandam Ulagam; Gautami – Vishwaroopam
Best Debut Director	Best Crew
Atlee – Raja Rani; Durai Senthilkumar – Ethir Neechal; Nalan Kumarasamy – Soodhu Kavvum; Naveen – Moodar Koodam; R. S. Prasanna – Kalyana Samayal Saadham	Ethir Neechal
Best Find of the Year	Best Song of the Year
George C. Williams	Anirudh Ravichander – "Ethir Neechal Adi" (Ethir Neechal)
Contribution to Tamil Cinema	Chevalier Sivaji Ganesan Award for Excellence in Indian Cinema
Balu Mahendra	Shankar
Best Entertainer of the Year	Entertainer of Indian Cinema
Sivakarthikeyan	Shah Rukh Khan

Special Jury Awards

- Vijay Sethupathi (Actor)
- Soodhu Kavvum (Film)

=== Favorite awards ===
Favorite Hero	Favorite Heroine
Vijay – Thalaivaa; Suriya – Singam 2; Dhanush – Maryan; Kamal Haasan – Vishwaroopam; Ajith Kumar – Arrambam	Nayantara – Raja Rani; Amala Paul – Thalaivaa; Anushka Shetty – Singam II; Hansika Motwani – Theeya Velai Seiyyanum Kumaru; Trisha Krishnan – Endrendrum Punnagai
Favorite Film	Favorite Director
Arrambam; Raja Rani; Singam 2; Varuthapadatha Valibar Sangam; Vishwaroopam	Kamal Haasan – Vishwaroopam; Bala – Paradesi; Hari – Singam II; Pandiraj – Kedi Billa Killadi Ranga; Vishnuvardhan – Arrambam
Favourite Song	
Oodhaa Colouru Ribbon – Varuthapadatha Valibar Sangam; "Ethir Neechal Adi" – Ethir Neechal; "Nenjukulle" – Kadal; "Hey Baby" – Raja Rani; "Kaasu Panam" – Soodhu Kavvum	

=== Multiple nominations ===
The following eleven films received four nominations or more:

Nominations	Film
16	Vishwaroopam
15	Raja Rani
13	Soodhu Kavvum
12	Kadal
11	Paradesi
10	Maryan
8	Pandiya Naadu
7	Ethir Neechal
6	Singam II
5	Varuthapadatha Valibar Sangam
4	Neram

The following seven films received multiple awards:

Awards	Film
6	Kadal
4	Paradesi
4	Soodhu Kavvum
3	Pandiya Naadu
3	Raja Rani
3	Vishwaroopam
3	Ethir Neechal
