= Sendrayan =

Indian actor

Senrayan
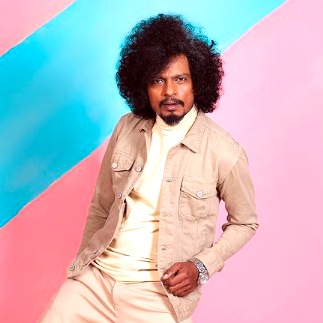
- Born: Bodinayakkanur, Theni, Tamil Nadu, India
- Other name: Sendu
- Occupation: Actor
- Years active: 2007-present
- Spouse: Kayalvizhi
- Children: 2

Senrayan is an Indian actor who has predominantly worked in Tamil language films. After making his acting debut in Vetrimaaran's Polladhavan (2007), he appeared in other small roles before winning acclaim for his portrayal of a petty criminal in Moodar Koodam (2013). He has since appeared in antagonistic and comedic roles in films, including Puthiya Niyamam (2016) and Metro (2016).

== Career ==
Senrayan made his acting debut in Vetrimaaran's Polladhavan (2007), and later also played a small role in the director's Aadukalam (2011) with both of the films starring Dhanush. He made a breakthrough with his performance in Moodar Koodam (2013) portraying a young criminal. The success of the film prompted him to play several similar antagonistic roles in films including Puthiya Niyamam (2016) and Metro (2016). In 2015, he played the lead role in the small budget film, Vishayam Veliye Theriya Koodadhu, which went unnoticed at the box office.

In 2018, he was a contestant in the Tamil reality television show, Bigg Boss hosted by Kamal Haasan.

== Personal life ==
Senrayan married Kayalvizhi at Senraaya Perumal Kovil in Vathalagundu during August 2014. She later announced her pregnancy during her brief visit to the Bigg Boss house when Senrayan was a contestant.

On 13 May 2021, Senrayan was tested positive for COVID-19.

== Filmography ==
=== Film ===
List of Sendrayan film credits
Year	Film	Role	Notes
2007	Polladhavan	Bike thief	
2007	Achacho	Young man	
2008	Silambattam	Local rogue	
2011	Aadukalam	Nicholas	
2011	Rowthiram	Gowri	
2013	Sundaattam	Prabhakaran's friend	
2013	Thulli Vilayadu	Thangavelu	
2013	Moodar Koodam	Sendrayan	Ananda Vikatan Cinema Award for Best Comedian
2014	Rummy	Sakthi's friend	
2014	Pongadi Neengalum Unga Kadhalum	Sega	
2014	Mosakutty	Sendru	
2014	1 Pandhu 4 Run 1 Wicket	Singam	
2015	Vishayam Veliye Theriya Koodadhu		
2015	Ivanuku Thannila Gandam	Milk Pandi	
2015	Lodukku Pandi	Koodu Mohideen	
2015	Yatchan	Mark	
2015	Thiruttu Rail	Ram	
2016	Puthiya Niyamam	Pachai	Malayalam film
2016	Paisa		
2016	Metro	Kumar	
2016	Adra Machan Visilu		
2016	Kolanji		
2016	Nayaki	Murali Krishna	Bilingual film in Telugu and Tamil
2016	Nayagi	Murali Krishna	Bilingual film in Telugu and Tamil
2017	Pa. Pandi	Drug seller	
2017	Thiri		
2017	Spyder	Rogue	Bilingual film in Telugu and Tamil
2018	Vidhi Madhi Ultaa	Ramesh	
2018	Nimir	Auto Driver	
2018	Kaathiruppor Pattiyal	Baskar	
2018	Panjumittai	Kuppu	
2018	Kalari	Thief	
2018	Vada Chennai	Localite Resident	Cameo Role
2019	Kolanji		Cameo appearance in the song "Tamizhanda"
2019	Asuran	Pechimuthu	
2020	Alti	Joni	
2021	Sulthan	Mansoor's goon	
2021	Kasada Thapara	Vedha	Streaming release
2022	Kombu Vatcha Singamda		
2023	Irumban	Aspathiri	
2023	Kondraal Paavam	Kannapan	
2023	Kannai Nambathey	Simon	
2023	Ithu Kathaiyalla Nijam		
2023	Tamilarasan		
2023	Pathu Thala	Poongunran	
2023	Tamil Kudimagan		
2023	Mark Antony	Antony's henchman	
2024	Local Sarakku		
2024	Singappenney		
2024	Finder Project 1	Raayan	
2024	Seeran	Selvam	
2025	Otha Votu Muthaiya		
2025	Robber		
2025	Gajaana		
2025	Thalaivan Thalaivii	Soman	
2025	Kutram Thavir		
2025	Revolver Rita	Kumar	
2026	Kaakaa		
2026	Parimala and Co	Varghese's friend	
2026	Parundhu		
2026	Singgaramm		

=== Television ===
List of Sendrayan television credits
Year	Show	Role	Notes
2018	Bigg Boss Tamil 2	Contestant	Evicted Day 84
2022	BB Jodigal Season 1	Contestant	
