= Varsha Bollamma =

Indian actress

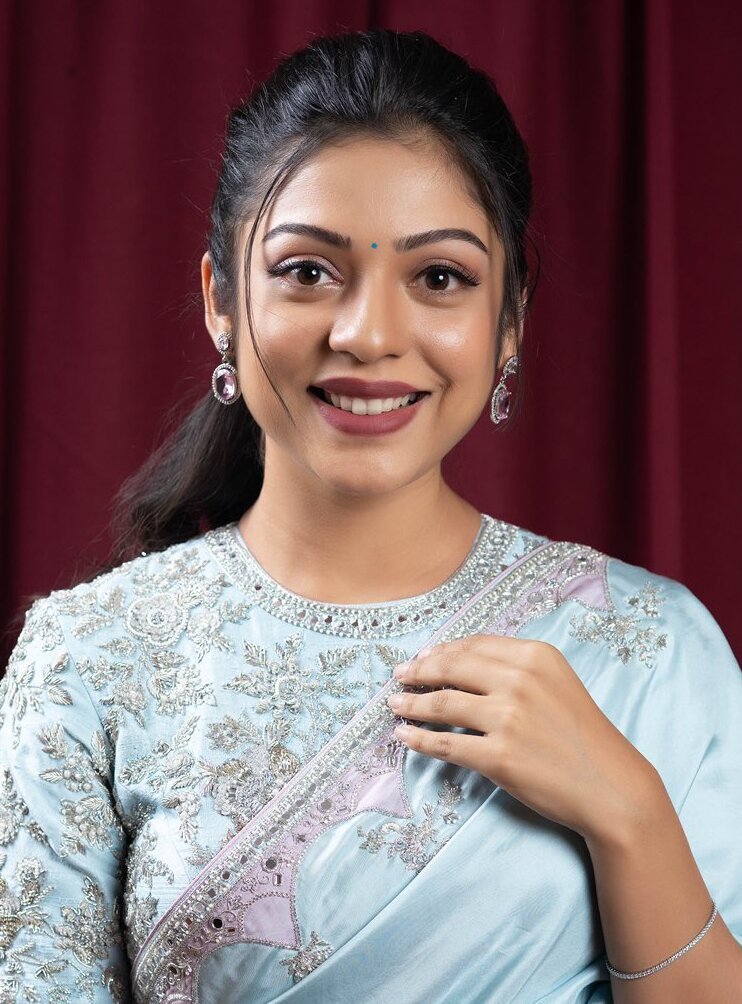
- Varsha in 2025
- Born: Coorg, Karnataka, India
- Education: Mount Carmel College, Bangalore
- Occupation: Actress
- Years active: 2015–present

Varsha Bollamma is an Indian actress who predominantly works in Tamil and Telugu films. She made her acting debut with the Tamil film Sathuran (2015). Varsha's notable films include Yaanum Theeyavan (2017), '96 (2018), Bigil (2019), Middle Class Melodies (2020) and Ooru Peru Bhairavakona (2024). Bigil remains her highest grossing release.

== Early life ==
Varsha was born in Coorg, Karnataka and brought up in Bengaluru. She completed her education in microbiology from Mount Carmel College, Bangalore. Varsha is fluent in multiple languages including Kannada, Tamil, Malayalam and has learned to speak Telugu as well.

== Career ==
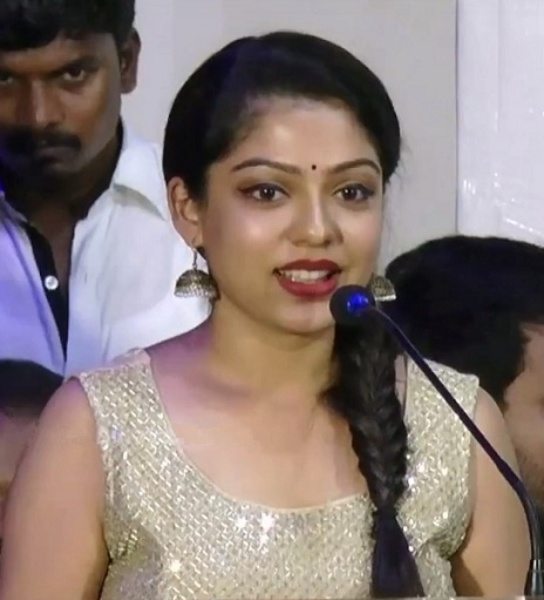
Varsha in 2017

Varsha gained initial recognition for her Dubsmash videos, particularly for her rendition of Nazriya Nazim's dialogues from the Tamil film Raja Rani (2013). She made her acting debut in the film Sathuran in 2015. Following that, she played a significant role in Vetrivel (2016) alongside M. Sasikumar, portraying the character of Prabhu's daughter. Her filmography includes Ivan Yarendru Therikiratha (2017) and Yaanum Theeyavan (2017). In 2018, Varsha made her debut in the Malayalam film industry with Kalyanam and also appeared in another Malayalam movie, Mandharam, starring Asif Ali. Her notable presence in Tamil films was marked by her performance in 96 alongside Vijay Sethupathi and Trisha, where she played a small role. Varsha also appeared in Seemathurai. In 2019, she acted in Pettikadai starring Samuthirakani. Her third Malayalam film, Soothrakkaran, alongside Gokul Suresh, was also released in the same year.

In the 2019 film Bigil, written and directed by Atlee, Varsha portrayed the character of a football player. The film emerged as the highest-grossing Tamil film of 2019 and the second highest grossing South Indian film of 2019. Janani K of India Today noted, "Varsha does her best and her story gives the much-needed depth to the film."

== Filmography ==
Key
†	Denotes films that have not yet been released

=== Films ===
Year	Title	Role	Language	Notes	Ref.
2015	Sathuran	Janani	Tamil	Debut film; Credited as Varsha Maletira	
2016	Vetrivel	Subha	Tamil		
2017	Ivan Yarendru Therikiratha	S.I. Savithri	Tamil		
2017	Yaanum Theeyavan	Soumya	Tamil		
2018	Kalyanam	Shari	Malayalam	Malayalam Debut	
2018	Mandharam	Charu	Malayalam		
2018	'96	Prabhavathi "Prabha"	Tamil		
2018	Seemathurai	Poorani	Tamil		
2019	Pettikadai	Thangam	Tamil		
2019	Soothrakkaran	Aswathy Balachandran	Malayalam		
2019	Bigil	Gayathri Sudarshan	Tamil		
2020	Choosi Choodangaane	Shruthi	Telugu	Telugu Debut	
2020	Jaanu	Prabha	Telugu		
2020	Middle Class Melodies	Sandhya	Telugu	released on Amazon Prime Video	
2020	Mane Number 13	Nancy	Kannada	released on Amazon Prime Video; Bilingual film	
2020	13aam Number Veedu	Nancy	Tamil	released on Amazon Prime Video; Bilingual film	
2021	Pushpaka Vimanam	Sundar's prospective bride	Telugu	Cameo appearance	
2022	Selfie	Madhavi	Tamil		
2022	Akka Kuruvi	Older Sara	Tamil	Cameo appearance	
2022	Stand Up Rahul	Sreya Rao	Telugu		
2022	Swathi Muthyam	Bhagyalakshmi "Bhagi"	Telugu		
2024	Ooru Peru Bhairavakona	Bhoomi	Telugu		
2025	Thammudu	Chitra	Telugu		
TBA	Iruvam †	TBA	Tamil	Bilingual film; English Debut; completed	
TBA	Iruvam †	TBA	English	Bilingual film; English Debut; completed	

=== Television ===
Year	Title	Role	Network	Language	Notes	Ref.
2022	Meet Cute	Swati Ghanta	SonyLIV	Telugu	Segment: "Meet the Boy"	
2024	My Perfectt Husband	Deepika	Disney+ Hotstar	Tamil		
2025-26	Constable Kanakam	PC Dimmala Kanaka Mahalakshmi "Kanakam"	ETV Win	Telugu	Season 1 & 2	

== See also ==
- List of Tamil film actresses
- List of Telugu film actresses
