= Kappal =

2014 Indian film by Karthik G. Krish

- Theatrical release poster
- Directed by: Karthik G. Krish
- Written by: Karthik G. Krish
- Produced by: P.L. Arulraj; Senthil; Sudhan; Jayaram; Thiagarajan; Umashankar; Guruprasad; Mike Dolphin
- Starring: Vaibhav; Sonam Bajwa
- Cinematography: Dinesh B. Krishnan
- Edited by: Anthony
- Music by: Natarajan Sankaran
- Production company: I Studios Entertainment
- Distributed by: S Pictures; Kalasangham Films
- Release date: 25 December 2014
- Country: India
- Language: Tamil

Kappal (transl. The Ship) is a 2014 Indian Tamil-language romantic comedy film directed by Karthik G. Krish, a former assistant of Shankar. Produced by I Studios Entertainment, the film stars Vaibhav and Sonam Bajwa, while Karunakaran, Arjunan, Venkat Sundar, Karthik Priyadarshan, VTV Ganesh, and Robo Shankar, appear in supporting roles. The music was composed by Natarajan Sankaran with editing by Anthony and cinematography by Dinesh Krishnan. The film was released by Shankar's S Pictures on 25 December 2014. It was dubbed in Hindi as Main Hoon Dilwala by Goldmines Telefilms Pvt Ltd. The movie had a dubbed Telugu release, titled Pandavullo Okkadu.

== Plot ==
The story starts with Vasu narrating his story from childhood. He has four close friends: Kanagasabhapathi, Kalyanasundaram, Pattabi, and Venky. The five friends worship Seenu Anna for his dedication to friendship, and one day, he advises to them that marriage will spoil friendship.

All the friends take this seriously, except for Vasu, who has a liking for girls, and he is forced to promise not to marry lifelong along with his friends. After failing many attempts of falling in love at school and college (his friends spread rumors that he is gay), he decides to leave to Chennai so that he would get an opportunity to love a girl. He stays with Nelson, who has affairs with many rich and beautiful girls. Nelson persuades Vasu to trap a rich girl, citing that middle-class and college girls will have bigger competition and high expectations, but rich girls have very less expectations, and many guys do not try to date them, assuming that it is impossible to woo them. He hands the pub membership card to Vasu so that he can get to see many rich girls.

During a visit to the pub, Deepika arrives in an Audi car with a male friend, who collapses due to excess drinking. Vasu falls in love with her instantly, helps her lift the friend, accompanies her to the pub, and befriends her. However, when he visits her home the next day, she is unable to remember him since she was drunk the previous night and rejects his love advances. After all the cop thrashing and goons threatening, Deepika falls in love with him.

Meanwhile, Vasu's friends come to know about his love affair and threaten him to break up with her, but when he acts as if he is committing suicide, they act as if they accept his love but plan to irritate Deepika and break their love. Deepika gets annoyed by their behavior. Soon, the four friends manage to create a rift between both of them, and the duo gets separated. Deepika gets depressed and decides to marry a family friend who has kept proposing to her from the beginning. Vasu feels depressed after the breakup, and his friends decide that the only way they can see their friend happy is to patch him up with his lady love, and they plot many master plans to stop the wedding. Soon, it is stopped.

Deepika then marries Vasu, and they lead a happy life. Vasu also keeps in touch with his friends forever.

== Cast ==
- Vaibhav as Vasudevan
- Sonam Bajwa as Deepika
- Karunakaran as Kanagasabhapathi
- Arjunan as Kalyanasundaram
- Venkat Sundar as Pattabi
- Karthik Priyadarshan as Venky
- VTV Ganesh as Nelson
- Robo Shankar as Seenu Anna
- Rajan Iyer as Deepika's father
- Steeve Vatz as Deepika's fiancée
- Raviraj as Venky's father
- Swathi Shanmugam as Gayathri
- Theni Murugan as Tea Master
- Preethi Indrani Kitchappan
- Boys Rajan
- George Vishnu
- Sharmila Thapa
- Latsumi
- Vineetha

== Production ==
Karthik Krish, who had apprenticed under director Shankar in Enthiran (2010), wrote the comedy script and had hoped to sign either actors Jai or Sivakarthikeyan for the role, before selecting Vaibhav. The film began its shoot in March 2013 with scenes shot in Chennai with the lead cast. Initially Ashrita Shetty had signed up to portray the film's lead actress but delays meant that she was replaced by newcomer Sonam Bajwa. Natarajan Sankaran replaced Santhosh Narayanan as the film's music composer, although the latter agreed to sing a song for the film's soundtrack.

In April 2014, the film began another schedule with the director remarking that Vaibhav's character in the film would have shades of the role portrayed by Karthik in Mani Ratnam's Mouna Ragam (1986). After a successful screening in September 2014, director Shankar bought the film and made plans to release it, marking a comeback to film production after a four-year hiatus.

== Soundtrack ==
Kappal

Soundtrack album by Natarajan Sankaran
- Released: 22 November 2014
- Recorded: 2014
- Genre: Feature film soundtrack
- Length: 21:26
- Label: Sony Music South
- Producer: Natarajan Sankaran

Natarajan Sankaran chronology
Oru Kanniyum Moonu Kalavaniyum (2014)	Kappal (2014)	Engitta Modhathey (2017)

The music and background score of the film were composed by Natarajan Sankaran. The soundtrack features six tracks that belonged to varied genres, one of them being a remix of the song "Ooru Vittu Ooru Vandhu", originally composed by Ilaiyaraaja for Karagattakaran (1989). The soundtrack album was released on 22 November 2014. Kappal's songs topped in FM station like the Radio Mirchi Top 5 for six weeks and the Suryan FM Top 10 and held 2nd place in the iTunes chart for two weeks, especially Kadhal Cassatta, which became the most favourite song in all stations.

Kappal (Original Motion Picture Soundtrack)
No.	Title	Lyrics	Singer(s)	Length
1.	"Oru Cup Acid"	Madhan Karky	Deepak	04:06
2.	"Kaadhal Cassata"	Madhan Karky	Sathyaprakash, Saindhavi	04:11
3.	"Ekkachakkamaai"	Kabilan	Alphons Joseph, Ankita Mathew	04:13
4.	"Friendship"	Kabilan	Anthony Daasan	03:31
5.	"Kaali Pasanga"	Karthik G Krish	Santhosh Narayanan	03:22
6.	"Ilayaraja's Ooru Vittu Ooru Vandu Remix"	Gangai Amaren	Sriram Parthasarathy	02:55
Total length:				21:26

== Critical reception ==
Sudhir Srinivasan from The Hindu wrote, "Kappal fulfils its only purpose — to be funny...here’s actor Vaibhav’s big breakthrough as a solo hero. This Kappal sails strong for the most part". Sify called Kappal a "watchable fun ride with witty dialogues and good writing". Rediff gave the film 2.5 stars out of 5 and wrote, "There may be flaws, but there is no denying that Karthik G Krish’s Kappal is thoroughly entertaining. But do remember to leave your thinking cap at home". The Times of India gave 3 stars out of 5 and wrote, "Karthik G Krish, is not after heavy philosophy but entertainment. So, he constructs the film as a comedy that is often silly, at times offensive but overall funny". silverscreen.in wrote, "Kappal is like that old joke, which only gets better with age. It also sustains the good spirit that the riotous pattimandram (debate talk show) of Solomon Pappaiah offers on festive mornings". The New Indian Express wrote, "Directed by a debutant, it’s meant to be a total comic entertainer. But then it depends on each one’s perception of what they feel are genuine comic moments"...going on to add that the film was "comedy probably targeted at the lowest common denominator in the audience".
