= Shivangi Lioness =

2025 Indian film by Devaraj Bharani Dharan

- Theatrical release poster
- Directed by: Devaraj Bharani Dharan
- Written by: Devaraj Bharani Dharan
- Produced by: Naresh Babu Panchumarthi
- Starring: Anandhi; Varalaxmi Sarathkumar
- Cinematography: Bharani K Dharan
- Edited by: Samjith Mohammed
- Music by: A. H. Kaashif
- Production company: First Copy Movies
- Release date: 7 March 2025
- Running time: 122 minutes
- Country: India
- Language: Telugu

Shivangi Lioness is a 2025 Indian Telugu-language drama thriller film written and directed by Devaraj Bharani Dharan. The film features Anandhi, Varalaxmi Sarathkumar and John Vijay in lead roles. The film was released theatrically on 7 March 2025.

== Plot ==
A fearless software engineer fights workplace harassment, societal blame, and a murder accusation only to uncover a dark conspiracy behind her husband's tragic death.

== Cast ==
- Anandhi as Sathyabhama
- Varalaxmi Sarathkumar as Sarika Singh
- John Vijay as Monster K
- Koya Kishore
- Srinivas Kamepalli
- Akshara Nunna as Rani, CBI Officer
- Dorababu

== Soundtrack ==
All music is composed by A. H. Kaashif.

No.	Title	Lyrics	Singer(s)	Length
1.	"Seema Bidda Raa"	Srinivas Kamepalli, Devaraj Bharani Dharan	Sahithi Chaganti, Shivani, Haripriya, Lakshmi Meghana	2:16

== Release and reception ==
Shivangi Lioness was released theatrically on 7 March 2025. The film was released on Aha on 18 April 2025.

The Times of India gave a rating of 3 out of 5 and praised Anandhi's performance. 10TV rated the film 2.75 out of 5 and praised the performance of Anandhi.
