= Sathuran =

2015 Indian film by Rajeev Prasad

- Directed by: Rajeev Prasad
- Produced by: P. Ponnusamy
- Starring: Rajaj; Varsha Bollamma
- Cinematography: Monikumar G
- Edited by: Suresh Urs
- Music by: A. K. Rishal
- Production company: Kuberan Cinemas
- Release date: 9 October 2015
- Country: India
- Language: Tamil

Sathuran (transl. City dweller/smart person) is a 2015 Tamil language action thriller film directed by Rajeev Prasad, a former associate of Suresh Krissna. The film stars Rajaj and Varsha Bollamma.

== Plot ==
Dheena is an auto driver. His love, at first sight, starts with Janani (Varsha). Fights between them start with searching for a dog puppy, then the diamond earring, then a currency at a parlor and so on. In all situations, Dheena has to search for them under the feet of the heroine. He makes many attempts to impress her and has one sided love. All his plans go in vain.

A family loses their jewels and money arranged for their daughter's marriage, which are recovered from one of their co-auto drivers Kumar (Kaali Venkat)

The movie starts with a gangster and his friend getting murdered by two paid goons when they come to shave their heads (a ritual) with all their fellow goons. The killers get their next assignment in the city to kill four (including S. I. Ratnam, Shiva - an auditor, a stage koothu actor named Theerthagiri). The paid goons who arrive in the city get their ride in Dheena's auto to reach their spot to kill the cop (S.I Ratnam). After Dheena leaves, his friend Kumar arrives at the same spot in a few minutes. Now the goons get Kumar's auto from there to reach the next spot to kill Shiva.

At the same time, Dheena is giving a ride to Janani and her friends on their way to a bridal makeup. The cop on patrol stops Dheena and the girls. Then he sexually harasses and abused the girls on the road side. On seeing the cop's behavior, Dheena gets offended and gets struck by the police. But the girls escape somehow in between these happenings.

Meanwhile, Kumar realizes that there is a bad currency in the money paid by the goons and returns to the place where he dropped the goons to exchange the money. He witnesses the killing of another victim (Shiva) by the same paid goons.

Kumar escapes from the scene without their notice. Unfortunately, he has to give them a ride again because he is unable to escape the place due to a starting trouble. So he gives the lift to the goons. On the way, he calls his friend Dheena, who is now in police custody and informs him about the killing and his current situation. Dheena escapes from the cop by jumping from the cop's vehicle to save his friend Kumar. On the way, he calls his other friend to go and save Kumar. Before they both reach there, Kumar is killed by the goons.

All CCTV evidence, neighbor's witnesses and the enmity of the investigating cop from whom Dheena was escaping, makes the cop decide that Dheena is the murderer. Moreover, in all the murder spots, there is one or other way an auto was involved or the auto's presence was noticed by the neighbors, which makes the cop to strongly believe that Dheena is the accused.

Dheena, who escaped from the cop, travels to all the spots. He witnesses and hears the conversations on how all the evidence are strongly against him. At the Mortuary, Dheena sees the bodies of S. I. Ratnam and Shiva beside his friend Kumar's body. He somehow realizes the link between the two bodies and another person Theerthagiri (Koothu actor). Again he escapes from the cop. Before he reaches to save Theerthagiri, the goons kill him as well before Dheena enters the back side of the stage. On seeing Dheena, the goons elope, leaving Theerthagiri. When trying to hold the lying body of Theerthagiri, both police and all audiences witness Dheena as the killer.

As usual, Dheena escapes from cop. Ehile recollecting the morning event, he realizes that the 4th person who was in the conversation with these 3 who were killed so far is Janani. Though Dheena did not see her face, he recognizes it as Janani from the tattoo on the back of her neck.

Before the cop and the goons get hold of Janani, Dheena meets her and informs her about all of the three deaths. He enquires her about her connection with those 3 dead permople. Janani reveals how she lost her previous job and her connections with those three dead people. Then she reveals some facts (a quick flashback on her previous employment) and a name she reveals at the end tells us who is the fourth person the goons are looking for to kill before they plan to kill Janani.

Dheena tells Janani that the fourth victim is his own father. Dheena calls his friend Salim to help protect his father. Dheena catches hold of one of the goons although the police inspector Pasupathi doubts him. Dheena figures out that two corrupt doctors are the head of the goons. Dheena catches the two doctors at the hospital, who are ready to kill him. Pasupathi eventually comes and realizes that Dheena is innocent after one of the doctors points the gun at him. Dheena eventually defeats the corrupt doctors, the last of which before dying reveals that they had made a poisonous substance and were to kill the four people that figured out about after Janani told them the secret.

== Cast ==
- Rajaj as Dheena
- Varsha Bollamma as Janani (credited as Varsha Maletira)
- Kaali Venkat as Kumar
- Raju Easwaran as Pasupathi
- Gautham Krishna
- Uma Maheswaran as Doctor
- Pradeep
- Josyula Shekar
- Bayilvan Ranganathan
- Bava Lakshmanan
- Cheranraj as S. I. Ratnam
- Yogi Devaraj
- Vijay Muthu
- Kambam Meena

== Production ==
Prasad at Worldcon 2026

Director Prasad worked under Suresh Krissna for the film Baashha (1995). Rajaj, who was last seen in Moodar Koodam, was cast as the director Prasad felt that his look prevented the audience from figuring act the former's next move. Bangalore-based Varsha Bollamma was cast as the heroine of the film while Monikumar G who worked as a cinematographer in Maryan and as an assistant cinematographer in Slumdog Millionaire and Mission: Impossible – Ghost Protocol, was signed as the cinematographer. Much of the film takes place during the night.

== Reception ==
The Times of India gave the film two out of five stars and wrote that "But if only had the execution been better, we would have been treated to a thrilling genre film" while praising the cinematography work and attention getting plot. A critic from Maalai Malar praised the screenplay, cinematography, and music, but criticized the long climax.
