= Koorman =

2022 Indian film

- Film poster
- Directed by: Bryan B. George
- Written by: Bryan B. George
- Produced by: Mathanakumar
- Starring: Rajaji; Janani; Bala Saravanan; Aadukalam Naren
- Narrated by: Gautham Vasudev Menon
- Cinematography: Shakthi Aravind
- Edited by: S. Devaraj & Rajesh.S
- Music by: Tony Britto
- Production company: MK Entertainment
- Release date: 11 February 2022
- Country: India
- Language: Tamil

Koorman is a 2022 Indian Tamil-language action thriller film written and directed by Bryan B. George and produced by MK Entertainment. The film stars Rajaji, Janani, Bala Saravanan, and Aadukalam Naren. The film's music is composed by Tony Britto, with cinematography handled by Shakthi Aravind and editing done by S. Devaraj. The film was released in theatres on 11 February 2022.

== Plot ==
Dhanasekaran lives off-grid in a secluded farmhouse with his servant Murugan and pet dog Subu. He also hallucinates his lover Stella and happens to be an ex-policeman with a traumatic past. He has a special ability to read people's minds, which is used by his ex-boss Raghuram to solve complex cases with Dhana's help unofficially. One such case happens to be the rape and murder of a young girl, and the killer, Naushad is handed over to Dhana for interrogation.

During his intense third-degree treatment, Naushad does not seem to be affected. When the policemen sent by Raghuram return to take back Naushad, he escapes captivity, and this irks Raghuram to the core as his job is on the line. Raghuram sets a 24 hour deadline to bring back Naushad or else he loses his job. Dhana sets out of his farm house after 13 long years to track and bring Naushad back to custody. During his travel back to the city, he recalls his past with his love interest Stella, who was raped and murdered by her cousin Robert for turning him down and how Dhana landed in his farmhouse alone with Murugan and Subu.

Instead of going after Naushad, Dhana tracks another young man named Abhishek, who is the spoiled son of a lawyer. Dhana kidnaps Abhishek to his farmhouse and interrogates him. He finds that Abhishek is the real killer of the girl who was in love with Naushad and that Naushad was framed in the murder. Dhana locks Abhishek locks him up in the underground cell. It is also found that Robert has also been locked up in the underground cell for the last 13 years. Robert explains the inhuman torture that Dhana is administering on him everyday and wishes that he died just to escape this hell. He also advises Abhishek to confess and go to prison instead of ending up like him.

Abhishek decides to confess and does so in front of a camera. The court convicts him to a life sentence. While coming out of the court, Abhishek's father notices that he has been beaten up and finds out that Dhana is the reason for this by bribing one of Raghuram's team members. He sets up a group of thugs to finish off Dhana inside his farmhouse. They join hands with the local thugs who were earlier thrashed by Dhana and assault him in the night. Dhana fights them off but gets gravely injured. However, he refuses to get medical help and dies in the farmhouse where Stella also lost her life 13 years ago. A second hearing declares that the earlier videotape was forced out of Abhishek and acquits him due to lack of evidence. Following this, the lawyer (the accused's father) is killed by Raghuram, which is made to look like an accident, and Abhishek ends up being the new inmate of the underground cell along with Robert.

The films ends with a group photo of the new members of the farm house - Dhana, Murugan, Subu, Naushad, and Stella (not visible to Murugan's eyes but visible to Naushad and Subu only) - posing for a picture, while Robert and Abhishek are locked up in the underground cell.

== Cast ==
- Rajaji as Dhanasekaran
- Janani as Stella
- Bala Saravanan as Murugan
- Aadukalam Naren as Raghuram
- Supergood Subramani as Kusthi Teacher
- Tha. Muruganantham as Electrician
- Praveen Kumar as Naushad
- Vijay Shankar as Abhishek
- Kamaldeep as Robert
- Pradeep K. Vijayan as Pradeep
- Sathish Prabhu as Gang Leader
- Vijay as Abhishek's father
- Wilson as Needhipathi

== Music ==
The music was composed by Tony Britto.

Track listing
No.	Title	Lyrics	Singer(s)	Length
1.	"Varayaadha Oviyam"	Uma Devi	Pradeep Kumar	5:18
2.	"Aambal Poo Ena Pookkiraai"	Uma Devi	Diwakar, Vaishali Jaishankar	5:52
3.	"Yaar Varuvaar"	Bryan B. George	Pradeep Kumar	3:15
Total length:				14:25

== Reception ==
The film released in theatres on 11 February 2022 and opened to mixed reviews. Suganth of The Times of India gave a rating of 2 out of 5 and called the film as an amateurish crime thriller. Vignesh Madhu of Cinema Express rated the film with 2/5 stars, stating that, "The film could've been much better if only the makers had steered clear of the cliches and had bigger ambitions".
