= Florent Pereira =

Indian journalist and actor (1952–2020)

- Born: 1952; Kumbakonam
- Died: 14 September 2020 (aged 67–68); Chennai, India
- Occupation: Actor
- Years active: 2003; 2014–2020

Florent C. Pereira (1952 – 14 September 2020) was an Indian journalist and actor who appeared in Tamil language films as a supporting actor.

== Career ==
Pereira completed a post-graduate degree in English literature from Annamalai University in 1976, before moving on to work in management roles in television channels including Vijay TV and Win TV in the 1990s and 2000s. Alongside his work as an actor, Pereira served as the General Manager of Kalaignar TV, a Tamil satellite TV channel based in Chennai, India. In 2011, he was awarded a lifetime achievements award from Lions Clubs International for his services to television.

He debuted as an actor with Pudhiya Geethai (2003) in a minor role. He made a breakthrough as an actor in the mid 2014, winning acclaim for his portrayal of a zamindar and the heroine's father in Prabhu Solomon's romantic drama Kayal (2014). Pereira was cast in a role after being spotted by Solomon during the finals of Kalaignar TV's reality show Naalaya Iyakunar, which Solomon had attended as a chief guest. After seeing Pereira welcoming guests on stage, Solomon's team contacted him and enquired about his interest in acting. For his role in Kayal, Pereira shot scenes at a village near Usilampatti and worked for over twenty days. The success of Kayal enabled Pereira to get further opportunities including the films Dharma Durai (2016) and Ayogya (2019).

== Death ==
Pereira died of COVID-19 during the COVID-19 pandemic in India in Chennai on 14 September 2020 at age 67. He had been hospitalized for two weeks.

== Filmography ==
- Puthiya Geethai (2003)
- Kayal (2014)
- Idam Porul Yaeval (2015)
- Thodari (2016)
- Raja Manthiri (2016)
- Dharma Durai (2016)
- Maaveeran Kittu (2016)
- Mupparimanam (2017)
- Engitta Modhathey (2017)
- Sathriyan (2017)
- Nenjil Thunivirundhal (2017)
- Podhuvaga Emmanasu Thangam (2017)
- Taramani (2017)
- Velaiilla Pattadhari 2 (2017)
- Kodiveeran (2017)
- Nagesh Thiraiyarangam (2018)
- Genius (2018)
- Sei (2018)
- Aygoya (2019)
- Kennedy Club (2019)
- Taana (2020)
- Utraan (2020)
- Ganesapuram (2021)
- Sarbath (2021)
- Tik Tok (2023)
- Kumki 2 (2025)
