= Kolanji =

2019 Indian film by Dhanaram Saravanan

- Theatrical release poster
- Directed by: Dhanaram Saravanan
- Written by: Dhanaram Saravanan; Naveen
- Produced by: Naveen
- Starring: Kirubakaran; Samuthirakani; Sanghavi; Rajaj; Naina Sarwar; Rajini Mahadevaiah
- Cinematography: Vijayan Munusamy
- Edited by: Athiyappan Siva
- Music by: Natarajan Sankaran
- Production company: White Shadows Productions Mayayantra Productions
- Release date: 26 July 2019
- Country: India
- Language: Tamil

Kolanji is a 2019 Indian Tamil-language comedy drama film co-written and directed by Dhanaram Saravanan, produced by Naveen, and starring Kirubakaran, Samuthirakani, Sanghavi, Rajaj, and Naina Sarwar. The film features cinematography by Vijayan Munusamy, editing by Athiyappan Siva, and music composed by Natarajan Sankaran. The film released on 26 July 2019.

== Plot ==
The film opens with a playful Kolanji (Kirubakaran) getting a few whacks from his father Appasamy (Samuthirakani), who is an atheist. Kolanji's playfulness and unruly behaviour lands him in trouble at all times with his father, who keeps scolding and beating him. This forms a hatred for his father in Kolanji, but he seems to be happy when he is with his uncle Gemini (Rajaj), and he helps him in his love for his cousin sister Poongoodi (Naina Sarwar). The story revolves around Kolanji and his feelings towards his father, and takes a drastic turn after an incident involving his younger brother. How Kolanji realises his father's affection when he lands in trouble with a fellow villager's son forms the rest of the story.

== Cast ==
- Kirubakaran as Kolanji
- Samuthirakani as Appasamy
- Rajaj as Gemini
- Naina Sarwar as Poongoodi
- Sanghavi as Pushpam, Appasamy's wife
- Nasath as Adivangi
- Uday Mahesh as Pushpam's Brother
- A. Govindamoorthy as Velappan
- Naadodigal Gopal as Villager
- Aadhira
- Rajini
- Rujil Krishna
- Rekha Suresh
- Sendrayan (special appearance in "Thamizhanda")

== Production ==
In February 2015, it was reported that director Naveen, who made his debut in Moodar Koodam (2013), was working on his second film titled Kolanji for producer Nehru Nagar Nandhu, who had earlier produced the Vidharth-starrer Kaadu (2014). Actors Samuthirakani, Sanghavi, Rajaj, and Naina Sarwar were selected to portray the lead roles, with production beginning in mid-2015. Samuthirakani had agreed to work on the film after being impressed by Naveen's previous film, while Sanghavi made a comeback to acting after a 10-year sabbatical. Soon after production was completed in August 2015, Naveen clarified that he had taken over as the producer of the film and that his assistant, Dhanaram Saravanan was the director and a co-writer for the project. Naveen revealed that Kolanji was the tale of a 12-year-old boy who wants to live life on his own terms, while his father wants to raise his children in a highly disciplined manner. The film was primarily shot in rural places including Rasipuram and Kokkarayan Pettai.

The film's promotion campaign began in mid-2016, but the venture was delayed owing to the presence of several other bigger budget films at the box office. Cinematographer P. C. Sriram released the film's motion poster in June 2016, while actor Silambarasan released a teaser for the film during the same month.

== Soundtrack ==
The film's score and soundtrack is composed by Natarajan Sankaran. The album was released on 9 February 2017.

Tamil (Original)
No.	Title	Lyrics	Singer(s)	Length
1.	"Ye Rosa"	Naveen	Deepak, Subiksha Richray	4:23
2.	"Fair and Lovely"	Naveen	Natarajan Sankaran, N. R. Priyanka	3:48
3.	"Thamizhanda"	Naveen	Deepak, Naveen	3:37
4.	"Ennatha Solla"	Yugabharathi	Sathyaprakash, Vandana Srinivasan	4:38
