= Anandhi (actress) =

Indian actress

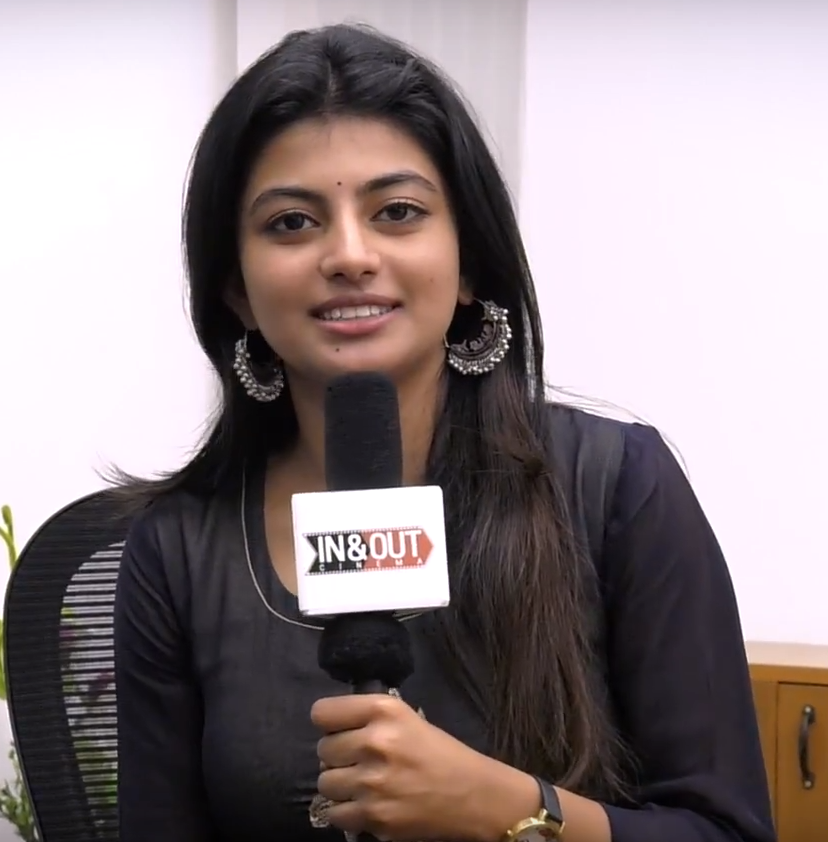
- Anandhi in 2016
- Born: Rakshita; 9 December 1992 (age 33); Warangal, Andhra Pradesh (now in Telangana), India
- Other name: Hasika
- Occupation: Actress
- Years active: 2012–present
- Spouse: Socrates (m. 2021)
- Children: 1
- Relatives: Naveen

Anandhi (born Rakshita; 9 December 1992) is an Indian actress who primarily appears in Tamil and Telugu films. After her debut in the Telugu film Bus Stop (2012), she appeared in Vetrimaaran's Tamil production Poriyaalan (2014). The same year she got her major breakthrough with Prabhu Solomon's Kayal (2014) by which she is recognized as Kayal Anandhi. She also won Special Prize for Kayal at the Tamil Nadu State Film Awards.

== Early life ==
Anandhi was born in a Telugu family in Warangal, Telangana.

== Career ==
Anandhi made her debut with Maruthi's coming-of-age film Bus Stop (2012). Her next film, Priyathama Neevachata Kushalama, opened in March 2013 to negative reviews, though a critic claimed that "the saving grace for the film is the performance of the lead pair - Varun Sandesh and Hasika", adding that Hasika "looks traditional and has put up a decent show as well."

She had also signed on to appear in the Tamil film, Poriyaalan (2014) alongside Harish Kalyan, written by Manimaran. During production, the scope of the film became larger after it was announced that director Vetrimaaran had chosen to invest in the venture as a co-producer.

Anandhi appeared in Prabhu Solomon's directorial venture Kayal, in which she plays the title role. The director decided to rechristen her as Anandhi from Rakshita for the film, and she was selected after auditioning twice before impressing Solomon. Her performance received praise. She was nominated for several Best Debut Actress awards for 2014, including at the Vijay Awards.

In 2015, Anandhi's first release was in A. Sarkunam's Chandi Veeran produced by Bala, in which she portrayed the romantic interest of Atharvaa's character. Anandhi then worked on the adult comedy flick Trisha Illana Nayanthara (2015) starring alongside G. V. Prakash Kumar. Post-release, Anandhi revealed her displeasure at working with the director and revealed that she was led to believe that the film would be a "cute love story" and not an "adult comedy". Anandhi nonetheless helped to promote the release of the film's Telugu version. In 2016, she played two films with G. V. Prakash Kumar in Enakku Innoru Per Irukku and Kadavul Irukaan Kumaru. In 2017, her films were Rubaai, Pandigai and En Aaloda Seruppa Kaanom. In 2018, she appeared in Mari Selvaraj's debut film Pariyerum Perumal, an acclaimed Tamil film on caste discrimination. The film was released to positive reviews, while the cast's performance was critically acclaimed. Her next project was Irandam Ulagaporin Kadaisi Gundu (2019). Anandhi's character in the film was similar to that she played in Pariyerum Perumal.

Anandhi appeared in the web series Live Telecast (2021) directed by Venkat Prabhu and starring Kajal Aggarwal and Vaibhav Reddy.

== Personal life ==
Anandhi married Socrates on 7 January 2021 in Warangal, Telangana. He is a marine engineer turned assistant director, philosopher, and brother-in-law of Moodar Koodam–fame director Naveen, notable for working in Alaudhinin Arputha Camera and Agni Siragugal. Anandhi and Socrates have a son.

== Filmography ==
=== Films ===
Key
| † | Denotes films that have not yet been released |

| Year | Title | Role | Language | Notes | Ref. |
|---|---|---|---|---|---|
| 2012 | Ee Rojullo | A girl who cheats another guy | Telugu | Minor role | |
| 2012 | Bus Stop | Seema | Telugu | | |
| 2013 | Priyathama Neevachata Kusalama | Preethi | Telugu | Credited as Hasika | |
| 2013 | Naayak | Babji's henchman's sister | Telugu | Cameo appearance | |
| 2014 | Green Signal | Jessie | Telugu | | |
| 2014 | Poriyaalan | Shanthi | Tamil | | |
| 2014 | Kayal | Kayalvizhi "Kayal" | Tamil | Tamil Nadu State Film Award Special Prize | |
| 2015 | Chandi Veeran | Thamarai | Tamil | | |
| 2015 | Trisha Illana Nayanthara | Ramya | Tamil | | |
| 2016 | Visaranai | Shanthi | Tamil | | |
| 2016 | Enakku Innoru Per Irukku | Hema | Tamil | | |
| 2016 | Kadavul Irukaan Kumaru | Nancy | Tamil | | |
| 2017 | Rubaai | Ponni | Tamil | | |
| 2017 | Pandigai | Kavya | Tamil | | |
| 2017 | En Aaloda Seruppa Kaanom | Sandhya | Tamil | | |
| 2018 | Mannar Vagaiyara | Ilaiyarani | Tamil | | |
| 2018 | Pariyerum Perumal | Jothi Mahalakshmi | Tamil | | |
| 2019 | Irandam Ulagaporin Kadaisi Gundu | Chithra | Tamil | | |
| 2021 | Zombie Reddy | Nandini Reddy / Shailaja Reddy (fake) | Telugu | | |
| 2021 | Sridevi Soda Center | "Sodala" Sridevi | Telugu | | |
| 2021 | Kamali From Nadukkaveri | Kamali | Tamil | | |
| 2022 | Nadhi | Bharathi | Tamil | | |
| 2022 | Itlu Maredumilli Prajaneekam | Lachimi | Telugu | | |
| 2022 | Yugi | Karthika | Tamil | | |
| 2022 | Adrishyam | Karthika | Malayalam | | |
| 2023 | Custody | Malar | Tamil / Telugu | Cameo appearance | |
| 2023 | Raavana Kottam | Indra Priyadarshini | Tamil | | |
| 2023 | Vidhi | Pallavi | Telugu | | |
| 2024 | Mangai | Mangai | Telugu | | |
| 2024 | White Rose | Divya | Tamil | | |
| 2025 | Shivangi Lioness | Sathybhama | Telugu | | |
| 2025 | Bhairavam | Neelima | Telugu | | |
| 2025 | Premante | Ramya | Telugu | | |
| 2026 | The RajaSaab | Lady at carnival | Telugu | Cameo appearance | |
| 2026 | Garividi Lakshmi | Vijayalakshmi "Garividi Lakshmi" | Telugu | | |
| 2026 | Titanic | | Tamil | | |

=== Television ===
| Year | Title | Role | Network | Language | Ref. |
|---|---|---|---|---|---|
| 2010 | Aata Juniors | Contestant | Zee Telugu | Telugu | |
| 2021 | Live Telecast | Kalai | Disney+ Hotstar | Tamil | |
| 2022 | Dance India Dance Telugu | Judge | Zee Telugu | Telugu | |
| 2025 | Arabia Kadali | Ganga | Amazon Prime Video | Telugu | |
