= Finder Project 1 =

Indian Tamil-language suspense thriller film

Finder
- Theatrical release poster
- Directed by: Vinoth Rajendran
- Written by: Vinoth Rajendran
- Produced by: Rageef Subramaniam; Vinoth Rajendran.
- Starring: Charle; Sendrayan
- Cinematography: Prasanth Vellayangiri
- Edited by: Tamil Kumaran
- Music by: Surya Prasadh R.
- Production companies: Arabi Productions; Viyan Ventures
- Release date: 20 April 2024
- Country: India
- Language: Tamil

Finder Project 1 is a 2024 Indian Tamil-language suspense thriller film written and directed by Vinoth Rajendran. The film stars Charle and Sendrayan. The film was produced by Rageef Subramaniam and Vinoth Rajendran under the banner of Arabi Productions and Viyan Ventures.

== Cast ==
- Charle as Peter
- Nizhalgal Ravi as Dhayalan
- Sendrayan as Raayan
- Vinoth Rajendran as Vinoth
- Dharani Reddy as Pallavi
- Brana Abdulsalam as Ruby
- Nazar Anver Raja as Beema
- Gopinath Shankar as Guru
- Renu Rajan as Samiyar
- Neyveli N. Ravichandran as Councillor Sivaraman
- Sakila Ravichandran as Judge
- Selvendran as Samiyar's assistant
- Gurumoorthy as Student
- Vinoth Babu as Tom
- A. G. D. Bala Kumar as Charan Raj
- Sai Sarath as Mechanic
- Mayuran as Mechanic
- Sivaranjini as Esther
- Savitha as Police
- Thondan Jega as Police
- Srilatha as Police
- Sai Dev Anand as Professor
- Sai as Student
- Aishwarya as Student
- Ashwin as Student
- Kiranya as Young Ruby

== Production ==
The film was shot across Chennai and Ramnad.

== Reception ==
Abhinav Subramanian of The Times of India rated 2.5 out of 5 and wrote that "Flaws aside, it has the genre elements to sustain it. It'll satisfy some of your curious itch."

Manigandan KR of Times Now Stated that "The film is a decent investigative thriller that is fairly engaging." and rated 2.5 out of 5.

Maalai Malar critic gave a mixed review.
