= Constable Kanakam =

Indian Telugu-language webseries

- Genre: Mystery; Thriller
- Created by: Prasanth Kumar Dimmala
- Written by: Prasanth Kumar Dimmala
- Directed by: Prasanth Kumar Dimmala
- Starring: Varsha Bollamma; Rajeev Kanakala; Megha Lekha; Srinivas Avasarala
- Music by: Suresh Bobbili
- Country of origin: India
- Original language: Telugu
- No. of seasons: 2
- No. of episodes: 10

Production
- Executive producer: V. Mohan Rao
- Producers: Kovelamudi Satya Saibaba; Vemuri Hemanth Kumar
- Cinematography: Sriram Mukkapati
- Editor: Madhav Kumar Gullapalli
- Production company: Meteor Entertainments

Original release
- Network: ETV Win
- Release: 14 August 2025 – present

Constable Kanakam is an Indian Telugu-language mystery thriller television series created, written and directed by Prasanth Kumar Dimmala. The series features Varsha Bollamma, Rajeev Kanakala, Megha Lekha and Srinivas Avasarala in important roles. It premiered on 14 August 2025 on ETV Win. The second season was released on 8 January 2026.

== Plot ==
=== Season one ===
Set in the 1990s in the village of Repalle, Srikakulam, the story follows Kanaka Mahalakshmi (Varsha Bollamma), a timid young woman who joins the local police force as a constable to fulfill her late mother's wish and her father's encouragement. Despite being ridiculed by her colleagues for her fearful nature—such as her phobia of lizards—Kanakam is tasked with investigating the "Adavi Gutta" forest, a forbidden zone where several young women have mysteriously disappeared.

The investigation becomes personal when Kanakam's close friend, Chandrika (Megha Lekha), goes missing. Kanakam uncovers a conspiracy involving local superstitions and black magic used as a front for a criminal smuggling ring. She discovers that the "kidnappings" are staged as ritual sacrifices to keep villagers away from contraband routes. After discovering evidence that links her own superiors to the operation, Kanakam goes rogue to infiltrate a ritual site, rescuing two abducted women. The season ends with the arrest of a sub-inspector and a political broker, though Chandrika remains missing.

=== Season two ===
Following her initial success, Kanakam continues her search for Chandrika. The investigation leads her out of Repalle to Pitapuram, where she follows a financial trail that uncovers shocking truths about her friend's identity and family background. She realizes that the conspiracy is deeper than a local smuggling ring and involves influential figures across the state. The season concludes with Kanakam successfully locating Chandrika and dismantling the core of the criminal network, while a post-credit scene teases a new case in the Adavi Gutta region.

== Cast ==
- Varsha Bollamma as PC Dimmala Kanaka Mahalakshmi "Kanakam"
- Rajeev Kanakala as HC B. Samba Siva Rao
- Megha Lekha in a dual role as Chandrika / Sahasra
- Srinivas Avasarala as President Prakash Rao; an ex Havildar
- Meesala Laxman as Bulli Babu; Prakash's maternal uncle
- Prem Sagar as SI S. Sadasivam
- Ramana Bhargava as PC Sathibabu
- Suchitraa Anandan
- Sunny Naveen as Babji
- Kishore Kumar Polimera as Veeri
- Vijay Raghav
- Jwala Koti as Chandrika's adoptive father
- Madhavi Priyadarshini
- Rakendu Mouli as Dr. Hanumanth Rao
- Soumya Varanasi
- Ramesh Konambhotla as Kanakam's father

== Episodes ==
Series	Episodes	Originally released
1	6	14 August 2025
2	4	8 January 2026

=== Season 1 (2025) ===
No. overall	No. in season	Title	Directed by	Written by	Original release date
1	1	"Jaathara"	Prasanth Kumar Dimmala	Prasanth Kumar Dimmala	14 August 2025
2	2	"Thappetagullu"	Prasanth Kumar Dimmala	Prasanth Kumar Dimmala	14 August 2025
Kanakam tracks multiple similar disappearances. Local elders claim the forest “takes” women who cross certain boundaries at night. She discovers half-burnt bangles and cloth near the stream, evidence the seniors ignore. Flashbacks reveal Kanakam’s motivation: her mother was a victim of domestic abuse who once told her, “Justice starts from courage.”
3	3	"Adivigutta"	Prasanth Kumar Dimmala	Prasanth Kumar Dimmala	14 August 2025
Kanakam teams up with a forest-guard trainee, Ravi, who helps her map the missing women’s last-seen points — forming a spiral pattern around a defunct temple. When they venture deeper, they find a hidden path used for illegal sand-mining and timber transport. The “myth” might be a cover-up for crime. A chilling night-time chase in the woods ends with them barely escaping masked men.
4	4	"Thrisulam"	Prasanth Kumar Dimmala	Prasanth Kumar Dimmala	14 August 2025
Evidence links the smuggling ring to one of Kanakam’s senior officers. She faces humiliation when she reports it — her superiors suspend her for “insubordination.” Ravi is attacked and hospitalized. The tension builds as Kanakam realizes the conspiracy extends into political circles.
5	5	"Mandasa Kova"	Prasanth Kumar Dimmala	Prasanth Kumar Dimmala	14 August 2025
Kanakam goes rogue. Disguised as a villager, she infiltrates a ritual site and finds proof that the kidnappings are staged sacrifices to scare locals away from the contraband routes. She rescues two abducted women and uncovers a video that shows her own superior overseeing the operations. The “goddess” turns out to be a symbol — a woman survivor hiding others from abusers — giving the series a feminist allegory twist.
6	6	"Nakshatram"	Prasanth Kumar Dimmala	Prasanth Kumar Dimmala	14 August 2025
Armed with the footage, Kanakam returns to confront her department. After a tense standoff, she arrests the sub-inspector and the political broker behind the ring. The ending mirrors the beginning: Kanakam stands again before the same forest, now calm, saluting the horizon — hinting that true law and order begin when someone dares to question power. A post-credit scene shows a file titled “Adavi Gutta – Case 2” being reopened, teasing Season 2.

=== Season 2 (2026) ===
No. overall	No. in season	Title	Directed by	Written by	Original release date
7	1	"Konda Thelu"	Prasanth Kumar Dimmala	Prasanth Kumar Dimmala	8 January 2026
8	2	"Addam"	Prasanth Kumar Dimmala	Prasanth Kumar Dimmala	8 January 2026
9	3	"Selavu"	Prasanth Kumar Dimmala	Prasanth Kumar Dimmala	8 January 2026
10	4	"Siksha"	Prasanth Kumar Dimmala	Prasanth Kumar Dimmala	8 January 2026

== Production ==
Filming began on 2 December 2024 and the show was announced on the same day.

== Reception ==
=== Season one ===
Avad Mohammad of OTTPlay praised the lead cast performances, production design and background score, while being critical towards the screenplay. Echoing the same, 10TV gave a mixed review. 123Telugu wrote "Constable Kanakam is undoubtedly one of the well-made shows technically in the Telugu digital space" adding that writing doesn’t support.

=== Season two ===
Reviewing the season two, Avad Mohammed of OTTplay, wrote that “Varsha Bollama's show did not do much with its first season, but things change in season 2 as all the errors get rectified and things are much more gripping.“
