= Mane Number 13 =

Indian Kannada language horror-thriller film

- Release poster
- Directed by: Vivy Kathiresan
- Written by: Vivy Kathiresan
- Produced by: Krishna Chaitanya
- Starring: Ramana; Sanjeev; Praveen Prem; Varsha Bollamma; Aishwarya Gowda
- Cinematography: Sandeep Sadashiv
- Edited by: Castro
- Music by: A M SHA
- Production company: Sri Swarnalatha Productions
- Distributed by: Amazon Prime Video
- Release date: 26 November 2020
- Running time: 106 minutes
- Country: India
- Languages: Kannada; Tamil

Mane Number 13 (transl. House No. 13) is a 2020 Indian horror thriller film directed by Vivy Kathiresan and produced by Krishna Chaitanya under the banner of Sri Swarnalatha Productions. It stars Ramana, Sanjeev, Praveen Prem, Varsha Bollamma and Aishwarya Gowda. The film was simultaneously made in Kannada and Tamil with the latter titled as 13aam Number Veedu. The film was released via streaming on Amazon Prime Video on 26 November 2020 to negative reviews.

== Cast ==
- Ramana as Nishok
- Sanjeev as Aswanth
- Praveen Prem as Karthick
- Varsha Bollamma as Nancy
- Aishwarya Gowda as Preethi
- Chethan Gandarva as Ram
- Sathvika Appaiah as Ahalya
- Honnavalli Krishna as House Owner
- Pavithra as Devil Girl
- Sathya as Mimicry Shankar

== Release ==
The film after delay due to COVID-19 pandemic, was released on Amazon Prime Video on 26 November 2020, as direct-to-video platform.

== Reception ==
Sowmya Rajendran reviewing for The News Minute criticized the screenplay as "series of unimaginative scares, with no effort to build the suspense or create tension". He opines that it is horror in itself that the film was made. He concludes that stream the film only if there is a compelling reason and if anyone wants some scares, "... be warned, there is no boo, only boohoo." A critic from The Times of India rated the film two-and-a-half out of five stars and wrote that "Mane Number 13 can be watched of you're in the mood for some good old fashioned frights without any excessive expectations of being surprised". A critic from NDTV rated the film one-and-a-half out of five stars and wrote that "Mane No 13 is unabashedly derivative. That isn't the problem. That it chooses to make a spectacle of its penchant for puerility and snuff out any potential for intelligent and logical plot development is".
