= Engitta Modhathey =

2017 film by Ramu Chellappa

- Theatrical release poster
- Directed by: Ramu Chellappa
- Written by: Ramu Chellappa
- Produced by: Sunil Lulla
- Starring: Natty; Rajaj; Parvathy Nair; Sanchita Shetty; Radha Ravi
- Cinematography: Ganeshchandhrra
- Edited by: Athiyappan Shiva
- Music by: Natarajan Sankaran
- Production companies: Eros International; RV Films
- Distributed by: KR Films
- Release date: 24 March 2017
- Country: India
- Language: Tamil

Engitta Modhathey (transl. Don't mess with me) is a 2017 Indian Tamil-language historical action drama film, written and directed by Ramu Chellappa. The film stars Natty, Rajaj, Parvathy Nair and Sanchita Shetty. Co-produced by Eros International with RV Films, the film tells the story of two fan club leaders of the actors Kamal Haasan and Rajnikanth in Tirunelveli during 1988. The film had a theatrical release across Tamil Nadu on 24 March 2017.

== Cast ==
- Natty as Ravi
- Rajaj as Nallaperumal
- Parvathy Nair as Jayanthi
- Sanchita Shetty as Maragadham
- Radha Ravi as Mandhramoorthy
- Bala Singh
- Florent Pereira
- Sivasankar
- R. K. Vijay Murugan
- Vetrivel Raja
- Muruganandham
- Neelson
- Arivi
- Saravanan
- Suthenthiran
- Thadchayani
- Veeralakshmi

== Production ==
In May 2015, Eros International revealed that they would produce two Tamil language films in the forthcoming year — an action drama titled Enkitta Mothathe by Ramu Chellappa starring Natty and Rajaj, along with Pirai Thaediya Naatkal by Abraham Prabhu featuring Ashok Selvan. The title is derived from the song of the same name from Rajadhi Raja (1989). Director Ramu had earlier assisted director Pandiraj in Pasanga & Vamsam and Kedi Billa Killadi Ranga (2013) and worked as an assistant to director Selvaraghavan in Mayakkam Enna (2011). He had wanted to make a film set in the 1980s after being inspired by Sasikumar's Subramaniapuram (2008) and had successfully narrated the script to Soundarya Rajinikanth, who had been on Eros's board at the time. While writing the script, Ramu travelled to Nagercoil and Madurai and interviewed several cutout artists, while Natraj was given training by cutout artist Sada for his role in the film. Production began in mid 2015, with the film revealed to be about opposing fan groups of actors Rajinikanth and Kamal Haasan from the 1980s. Parvathy Nair was picked for a lead role, after the director was impressed with her performances in Yennai Arindhaal (2015) and Uttama Villain (2015). Sanchita Shetty was also cast in the film to portray a village belle and a Rajinikanth fan, who would be the love interest of Natraj.

== Soundtrack ==
Engitta Modhathey

Soundtrack album by Natarajan Sankaran
- Released: 10 November 2016
- Recorded: 2016
- Genre: Feature film soundtrack
- Length: 20:43
- Label: Eros Music
- Producer: Natarajan Sankaran

Natarajan Sankaran chronology
| Kappal (2014) | Engitta Modhathey (2016) | Evanukku Engeyo Matcham Irukku (2018) |

Natarajan Sankaran composed both songs and background score for this film, with Yugabharathi penning all the lyrics.

Tracklist
| No. | Title | Lyrics | Singer(s) | Length |
|---|---|---|---|---|
| 1. | "Paayum Puli" | Yugabharathi | Hariharasudhan, Velmurugan | 03:56 |
| 2. | "Onna Paathen Raasathi" | Yugabharathi | D. Imman, Vandana Srinivasan | 04:34 |
| 3. | "Payya Payya" | Yugabharathi | V. V. Prasanna, Vandana Srinivasan | 04:12 |
| 4. | "Othha Ruva Pottu Vechu Oppari" | Yugabharathi | Prabhu | 04:33 |
| 5. | "Lifea Fightu Da" | Yugabharathi | Natty | 03:28 |

== Release and reception ==
The satellite rights of the film were sold to Zee Tamil. The film had a theatrical release across Tamil Nadu on 24 March 2017, with the Deccan Chronicle giving the film a positive review. The critic stated "Enkitta Mothathey brims of life and enthusiasm and the cutouts bring this to the fore" and "Ramu Chellappa has done a good job in not the portraying the era in a frantic manner, but instead has used the fervent energy of the fans to its advantage". Likewise, The Hindu stated "Enkitta Mothathe can hope to reach for the stars" and that the film "aptly reflects the times and lives of the cut-out artists of the 80s". The Times of India wrote "a slew of characters, their unexpected plans to check the growth of the mandrams, a tale of friendship and two romantic tracks which run in parallel, keep the film engaging" but that "Ramu Chellappa doesn’t generate enough drama, and also fails to provide a satisfying conclusion". Srivatsan from India Today stated "Despite a very very generic story, Ramu Chellappa has wonderfully captured the aura surrounding a Rajini-Kamal release" and "for the same, Engitta Modhathey is nothing short of a nostalgia trip". Baradwaj Rangan wrote for Film Companion, "Slowly, Enkitta Mothathe begins to turn into one of those dramas where friends are manipulated by ruthless politicians and their henchmen. Even here, the director brings in Kamal-Rajini shadings."
