= Once Upon a Time in Madras =

Indian Tamil language film

- Theatrical release poster
- Directed by: Prasadh Murugan
- Written by: Prasadh Murugan
- Produced by: Captain MP Anand
- Starring: Bharath; Shaan; Abhirami; Thalaivasal Vijay; Rajaji; Pavithra Lakshmi; Anjali Nair
- Cinematography: K S Kalidoss; R Kannan
- Edited by: San Lokesh
- Music by: Jose Franklin
- Production company: Friday Film Factory
- Release date: 13 December 2024
- Running time: 120 minutes
- Country: India
- Language: Tamil

Once Upon a Time in Madras is a 2024 Indian Tamil-language hyperlink thriller film written and directed by Prasadh Murugan. The film features an ensemble cast consisting of Bharath, Shaan, Abhirami, Thalaivasal Vijay, Rajaji, Anjali Nair, and Pavithra Lakshmi in important roles. The film is produced by Captain MP Anand under Friday Film Factory, and co-produced by Haroon, Bala, and PGS. The film's technical crew includes editor San Lokesh, cinematographers K. S. Kalidoss and R. Kannan, and music composer Jose Franklin.

Once Upon A Time in Madras was released in theatres on 13 December 2024.

== Plot ==
Rangaraj, a retired army officer, shoots a young boy, Sudharshan, when he attempts to pluck mangoes from a nearby tree. During the investigation, it was discovered that the bullet missed Sudharshan's corpse. To evade accountability, Rangaraj disposes of the gun in the Coovum canal, where an unknown individual retrieves it.

Savitri, a sanitary worker and single mother, aspires to provide her transgender daughter Karthi "Aarthi" with a medical education. Savitri has borrowed ₹80,000 from a loan shark, Moorthy, who demands repayment with interest within a day. Fearing for her daughter's safety, Savitri contacts the police station but receives no assistance. Desperate, Savitri comes across a gun and hands it over to her friend Jothi, a former associate of Moorthy. Jothi and Savitri attempt to sell the gun to a pawnbroker for ₹30,000. However, the pawnbroker is arrested before Savitri can finalise the sale. Meanwhile, Aarthi is raped by Moorthy. Witnessing her daughter's suffering, Savitri confronts Moorthy and fatally shoots him. Jothi intervenes, fighting off Moorthy's men and ensuring Savitri's safety.

Anitha's father, a staunch casteist, opposes her relationship with a colleague from a different community. He discovers a gun in his car and rushes to the registrar's office upon learning that Anitha is getting married. En route, he accidentally hits a biker and offers the injured rider, Kathir, a ride. During their conversation, Anitha's father learns that Kathir is, in fact, his daughter's lover, on his way to marry Anitha at the registrar's office. Kathir, a social worker and communist thinker, reveals to Anitha's father that her fiancé is pregnant, prompting Anitha's father to shoot and kill him with the gun. At the registrar's office, Anitha's father discovers his daughter marrying someone else, revealing that Kathir was not her lover. Anitha's father is overcome with guilt upon seeing another girl waiting for Kathir and realising that he killed an innocent man.

Raja is seeking funds for his wife Rachel's kidney transplant surgery. The hospital demands payment by the next day, but Raja refuses to ask his wealthy in-laws for help, citing self-respect, since they had earlier rejected him for their daughter. Unable to arrange, Raja approaches Rachel's parents, but they refuse to help. In a desperate bid to secure the funds, Raja agrees to work for his former boss, thereby killing Kowsi, a social worker and communist thinker. After the murder, a dispute arises over the money, and Raja's boss kills his associate. Raja then kills his boss, burns the body, and escapes with the money. At the hospital, Raja is devastated to learn that the kidney donor is none other than Kowsi, whom he had killed earlier that morning. Rachel passes away, leaving Raja consumed by guilt for killing the donor who could have saved his wife. The police track Raja down in his car and shoot him to death.

Madhi, a newlywed, discovers that her husband Aravind and their house help Sampath are a gay couple. Madhi confronts Aravind, who confesses the truth, and she also learns that her father-in-law is responsible for her pregnancy. Madhi seeks medical help to abort the child, but her in-laws discover her plan and beat her for bringing disrespect to their family and attempting to abort their heir. Madhi discovers a gun in her bag and shoots her father-in-law for raping her and her mother-in-law for sedating her to facilitate the rape.

Finally, the journey of the gun is revealed. Savitri had initially discovered the gun in the Coovum canal, which she used to kill Moorthy. After disposing of the body, Moorthy's henchman placed the gun in Anitha's father's car. Anitha's father had used the gun to kill Kathir, mistaking him for Anitha's lover. Raja's boss was hired by Anitha's father to kill Kowsi, and the boss's associate secretly hides the gun, which he uses to negotiate with his boss. However, Raja, using that gun, killed his boss after a dispute over money and visited the hospital to pay for Rachel's surgery. Fearing the police, Raja placed the gun in Madhi's bag. Madhi, who now possesses the gun, used it to kill her parents-in-law.

== Cast ==
- Bharath as Raja
- Shaan as Kathir
- Abhirami as Savitri
- Thalaivasal Vijay as Anitha's father
- Rajaji as Jothi, Savitri's friend
- Pavithra Lakshmi as Anitha
- Anjali Nair as Madhi
- PG Saravanan as Moorthy
- Kaniha as Kowsi (Special appearance)
- B Dhayalan
- Disha Govindharaj as Karthi "Aarthi"
- Radhika
- Jegan Kaviraj as Moorthy's henchman
- Pasupathy Raj as Madhi's father
- Aroul D. Shankar as Madhi's father-in-law
- Gayathri Krishnan as a doctor
- Porkodi Senthil as Madhi's mother-in-law
- Sini Yudhan as Rachel, Raja's wife
- Kalki as Raja's associate
- Syed as Raja's boss
- Mrithula Suresh as Kathir's lover
- Soundarya Priyan as Anitha's mother
- Vignesh Mohandas as Anitha's brother

== Production ==
Actor Bharath who was last seen in Ippadiku Kadhal (2024) joined hands with debutant director Prasad Murugan for his upcoming hyperlink thriller film titled Once Upon A Time in Madras. Additionally, the director informed that a transgender person was cast in the film for an important role, rather than making a male artist perform so. The technical crew consists of editor San Lokesh, cinematographers K S Kalidoss and R Kannan, stunt choreographer Sugan and music composer Jose Franklin. In mid-March 2024, Prasad Murugan revealed that the principal photography had been completed and the film was in post-production stage.

== Music ==
Once Upon A Time in Madras

Soundtrack album by Jose Franklin
- Genre: Feature film soundtrack
- Language: Tamil
- Label: Divo Music
- Producer: Jose Franklin

Jose Franklin chronology
Take Diversion (2022)	Once Upon A Time in Madras (2024)

Singles from Once Upon a Time in Madras
- 1. "Po Po Che Guevera" Released: 28 September 2024

The soundtrack and background are composed by Jose Franklin. The first single "Po Po Che Guevera" released on 28 September 2024.

No.	Title	Lyrics	Singer(s)	Length
1.	"Po Po Che Guevera"	Jegan Kaviraj M	Vaikom Vijayalakshmi	3:04

== Release ==
Once Upon A Time in Madras released in theatres on 13 December 2024. Earlier it was scheduled for release on 26 September 2024. The film received an "A" certificate from the Central Board of Film Certification.

== Reception ==
Abhinav Subramanian of The Times of India rated three out of five star and stated that "Once Upon a Time in Madras is a satisfying film that avoids overreach, making it a solid watch. It’s like finding a favorite tune played in a different key – familiar yet distinct." Jayabhuvaneshwari B of Cinema Express rated two out of five stars and wrote "Once Upon a Time in Madras feels like a loaded chamber with no real firepower. The film misfires due to shoddy editing and poor execution, leaving its potentially impactful themes undermined."
