= Naan Mahaan Alla =

Naan Mahaan Alla (lit. 'I am not a saint') may refer to two Indian Tamil-language films:

- Naan Mahaan Alla (1984 film), a 1984 film starring Rajinikanth
- Naan Mahaan Alla (2010 film), a 2010 film starring Karthik Sivakumar and Kajal Aggarwal
  - Naan Mahaan Alla (soundtrack), its soundtrack by Yuvan Shankar Raja

== See also ==
- "Not a Saint", a 2013 song
