= Naveen (director) =

Indian Tamil-language actor

- Occupations: Film Director, Producer, Screenwriter, Actor
- Years active: 2013–present
- Spouse: Sindhu
- Children: 2

Naveen is a director, who works in the Tamil film industry. Naveen made his directorial debut with the critically acclaimed Moodar Koodam in 2013. He produces films under his production company, White Shadows Productions.

== Career ==
Naveen began his film career as an assistant director for Imsai Arasan 23rd Pulikecei (2006) and to Pandiraj. He worked as a writer, director, and producer with his first movie, Moodar Koodam. When Naveen narrated the script of Moodar Koodam to producers, many rejected, some wanted corrections and many questioned the narrative style. So he decided to produce the film on his own and launched White Shadows Productions. Director Pandiraj (of Pasanga movie fame) distributed the movie through his production house. Moodar Koodam was critically acclaimed and Naveen was appreciated for his screenplay, direction, and dialogues, winning the Best Dialogues award at the 8th Annual Vijay TV Awards. Naveen is currently producing Kolanji. Kolanji has a multi-cast ensemble, including Samuthirakani and Sanghavi.

In 2018, Naveen completed filming the fantasy thriller Alaudhinin Arputha Camera, where he starred alongside Anandhi. However, the film remains unreleased due to the financial dispute with Swarna Sethuraman of Flash Films who objected the film's release until Naveen pays his alleged past dues.

== Filmography ==
Year	Film	Director	Producer	Writer	Actor	Notes
2013	Moodar Koodam	Yes	Yes	Yes	Yes	Best Dialogues award at the 8th Star Vijay TV Awards
2019	Kolanji	No	Yes	Yes	No	

== Awards ==
- Best Dialogues – 8th Star Vijay TV Awards
- Best Social Outlook Film 2013 – Neeya Naana Awards 2013 (Vijay TV)
- Best Dialogue - Vikatan Awards 2013
- Official Selection - 11th Chennai International Film Festival
