= Moodar Koodam =

2013 Indian film by Naveen

- Theatrical release poster
- Directed by: Naveen
- Written by: Naveen
- Produced by: Naveen
- Starring: Naveen; Sendrayan; Kuberan; Rajaj; Oviya
- Cinematography: Tony Chan
- Edited by: Athiyappan Siva
- Music by: Natarajan Sankaran
- Production companies: White Shadows Productions; Pasanga Productions
- Release date: 13 September 2013
- Running time: 155 minutes
- Country: India
- Language: Tamil

Moodar Koodam (transl. Fools Gathering) is a 2013 Indian Tamil language action comedy film written, produced and directed by Naveen. The film stars the director himself alongside Sendrayan, Kuberan, and Rajaj in lead roles. Oviya, Anupama Kumar, Jayaprakash, Five Star Krishna, and Uday Mahesh play other pivotal roles. The film was produced by director Naveen himself under the "White Shadows Productions" banner with Pandiraj through his Pasanga Productions. The music is by Natarajan Sankaran. The film was released on 13 September 2013.

== Plot ==
Naveen, Sendrayan, Kuberan, and Vellaichami aka White are four men who are trapped in a cycle of poverty. The story begins with a meeting between them in a police station where they are held in connection with a theft case. Disillusioned with society and their place in it, they plan to burgle the mansion of White's treacherous uncle Bhaktavatsalam, whom they believe has left town with his family to go on a pilgrimage. Instead, as the four men plan to break into Bhaktavatsalam's residence, they discover that the family is still inside the house. Thereafter, the criminals take Bhaktavatsalam and his entire family hostage. What follows is a bizarre and comical hostage situation. At one point, the home intruders even force their hostages, including Bhaktavatsalam, his wife Mandothari, and his grown daughter, Karpagavalli to stand upside down on their heads. Soon, a variety of characters congregate to the house, and the four bandits get involved in a quagmire involving moneylenders, enforcers and the mafia.

== Cast ==
- Naveen as Naveen
- Sendrayan as Sendrayan
- Kuberan as Kuberan
- Rajaj as Vellaichami (White)
- Oviya as Karpagavalli "Kapuli"
- Jayaprakash as Bhaktavatsalam
- Anupama Kumar as Mandothari
- Uday Mahesh as Salim Bhai
- Five Star Krishna as Naaikaran
- Sindhu Naveen as Farzana
- Baskar as Thakali
- Sanjeevee as Auto Kumar
- Sabeesh as Sabeesh
- Manasa as Subiksha
- Winco Prakash as Kilavar
- Bobby Tejay as Miles
- Aadhira as Veetu Velaikkarar
- Raja Rishi as Vakka

== Soundtrack ==
Music was composed by newcomer Natarajan Sankaran. It includes a recreated version of the song "Neeyum Bommai" from Bommai (1964). The audio launch was held on 29 April 2013 at Sathyam Cinemas.

- "ABCD Ungappan" – Sricharan, Raginisri, Naveen
- "Achamillai" – S. P. B. Charan
- "Autokumar" – Natarajan Sankaran
- "Idhu Nalla Naai" – Naveen
- "Kannodu Kangal" – Srinivas
- "Moodar Koodam Theme"
- "Neeyum Bommai" – K. J. Yesudas
- "Nila Odi Va" – Subhiksha Rich Ray
- "Oru Oorula" – S. P. B. Charan
- "Vela Vetti" – Naresh Iyer

== Critical reception ==
Cinema Vikatan has given a highly positive feedback (50/100). Many things like cast, dialogue etc. were highly appreciated. The review also quoted that black-humour is very rare in Tamil cinema and the director was appreciated specially for his attempt. The Times of India wrote: " With snappy visuals, hyper-kinetic editing, this is a dark comedy influenced by world cinema while still being rooted to local values". Rediff.com wrote: "Comedy and satire are beautifully interwoven in Moodar Koodam with excellent support from all the cast. The only negative in the film is the number of characters and incidents incorporated into the film, creating an overdose of everything". Baradwaj Rangan wrote for The Hindu, "A genuinely scripted comedy, there are moments that are genuinely funny. His next film will be awaited with much interest."

== Accolades ==
The film won the Best Dialogues award at the 8th Vijay Awards, and was nominated in two other categories: Best Debut Director and Best Screenplay.
