= MY3 =

- Genre: Romantic comedy; Science fiction
- Based on: I'm Not a Robot by Han Hee, Kim Sun-mi and Lee Seok-joon
- Written by: M. Rajesh
- Directed by: M. Rajesh
- Starring: Hansika Motwani; Mugen Rao; Shanthanu Bhagyaraj
- Music by: S. Ganesan
- Country of origin: India
- Original language: Tamil
- No. of seasons: 1
- No. of episodes: 9

Production
- Producer: Raja Ramamurthy
- Cinematography: Karthik Muthukumar
- Editor: Ashish Joseph
- Production company: TrendLoud Digital India Private Limited

Original release
- Network: Disney+ Hotstar
- Release: 15 September 2023

Related
- I'm Not a Robot

MY3 is a 2023 Tamil-language television series produced by TrendLoud for Disney+ Hotstar. It is an Indian adaptation of the South Korean series I'm Not a Robot. Directed by M. Rajesh, the plot follows a girl who disguises herself as a robot in order to pay off her debts. The series stars Hansika Motwani, Mugen Rao, Shanthanu Bhagyaraj, and Janani. All episodes premiered simultaneously on 15 September 2023.

== Synopsis ==
EPISODE 1

We come across Adithya, a rich entrepreneur, who struggles to stay alone but yet stays with his robotic devices. Yet, he feels empty. A flashback story explains how he, his father, Chandrasekhar and his mother, Nandhini died in a car accident and only Adithya survived, so he feels dejected. A grown up Adithya feels bad about it, meanwhile he gets a report from his executive manager and his income tax officer, stating that he has been fooled by his friend Arjun and his father Rajasekhar, that they have done forgery and has transacted over a lot of money into their account. Hearing this, Adithya gets angry and fires them from work. An angry Rajasekhar and Arjun decide to avenge Adithya. Arjun who is very dumb and childish, uses his own stupid tricks to avenge Adithya. Meanwhile Adithya goes into a shop to receive a gift where the shop is owned by Manimeghalai(a fake name created by Mythiri-the female protagonist-to conceal her identity from her brother which comes in the later part of the story), because of the quality of the material of the umbrella, even though the idea was great(It glows in various colors when rain falls on it). Manimeghalai argues with Adithya and pushes him and touches him which causes a sudden reaction in his body and skin starts to burn. That is when the audiences come to know that he has a skin allergy where human touch causes a reaction in his skin and causing him immense pain. Showing this, the first episode ends.

EPISODE 2

== Cast ==
- Hansika Motwani as Mythiri/ Manimegalai/MY3
- Mugen Rao as Adhithya Chandrasekhar
- Shanthanu Bhagyaraj as Eliyas Ahamed
- Janani as Keerthana
- Narayan Lucky as Arjun Rajashekhar
- Ashna Zaveri as Thaara
- Parvathy Saran as Aarthi
- Anish Kuruvilla as Rajashekhar
- Tiger Thangadurai as Bruce
- Subbu Panchu as Dr. Narayanamurthy
- Ramar as Jack
- Bharath Kalyan as Advocate Sugumar
- Shakthi Raj as Sam
- Abishek Kumar as Ram
- Mona Kakade as Meena Narayanamurthy
- Sindhu Shyam as Nandhini Chandrasekhar, Aditya's Mother
- Nisha Krishnan as Nisha Sugumar
- Rakesh Menon as Chandrashekhar, Aditya’s father
- Nilani Chetty as Pavithra Dhanshekhar, Thaara’s mother
- Senthilnathan as Ramaswaamy
- Kavitha Suresh as a yoga instructor
- “Kadhal” Saravanan as Muthupaandi
- Madhuvanti Arun as Dr. Sandhya Reddy
- Raveena Ravi as MY3's Voice

== Production ==
=== Development ===
The series is produced by TrendLoud Digital India Private Limited. M. Rajesh, of Victim (2022) fame, has directed the series that deals with the Robert. The music for the series was composed by S. Ganesan. The cinematography was handled by Karthik Muthukumar, editing by Praveen Antony, Art Director by Kishore Rajendran, and Producer by Raja Ramamurthy.

=== Casting ===
Actress Hansika Motwani was cast as a double role, one of which will be a robot. This is her debut role in a limited series. Bigg Boss Tamil 3 fame Mugen Rao play the rich businessman, who is a rich but lives isolated life due to a severe allergy to physical contact with other human beings. Actor Shanthanu Bhagyaraj play as Mythiri's ex-boyfriend who is a Scientist.

=== Release ===
It was announced in August 2023 that the series will be released on 15 September 2023 in Tamil, Telugu, Hindi, Malayalam, Kannada, Bengali and Marathi languages on Disney+ Hotstar.

== Reception ==
Anusha Sundar of Cinema Express gave 2 star out of 5 and wrote that "MY3 does try hard, but that’s not enough to make this an engaging show." Thinkal Menon of OTTPlay gave 3 star out of 5 star and stated that "The entertaining plot offers a few delightful moments, thanks to the uniqueness of the subject. The performances keep you hooked to an extent, but the screenplay lacks the required punch." The public opinion was not in favor with some calling it the worst.
