= Oru Kal Oru Kannadi =

2012 Indian film by M. Rajesh

- Theatrical release poster
- Directed by: M. Rajesh
- Written by: M. Rajesh
- Produced by: Udhayanidhi Stalin
- Starring: Udhayanidhi Stalin; Hansika Motwani; Santhanam
- Cinematography: Balasubramaniem
- Edited by: Vivek Harshan
- Music by: Harris Jayaraj
- Production company: Red Giant Movies
- Distributed by: Red Giant Movies
- Release date: 13 April 2012
- Running time: 173 minutes
- Country: India
- Language: Tamil
- Budget: See below
- Box office: See below

Oru Kal Oru Kannadi (transl. A Stone, A Mirror; abbreviated as OKOK) is a 2012 Indian Tamil-language romantic comedy film written and directed by M. Rajesh and produced by Udhayanidhi Stalin under Red Giant Movies. The film stars Udhayanidhi Stalin, Hansika Motwani and Santhanam, with Saranya Ponvannan, Sayaji Shinde and Azhagam Perumal in supporting roles. The story revolves around Saravanan, who travels from Chennai to Puducherry with his friend Parthasarathy, to stop the wedding of his ex-girlfriend Meera. During the trip, he recollects his past with Meera and the events before their break-up.

Oru Kal Oru Kannadi is the acting debut of Udhayanidhi, and was named after a song from Rajesh's directorial debut Siva Manasula Sakthi (2009). Principal photography commenced in March 2011 and was nearly complete by February 2012. The film was predominantly shot in Chennai, Madurai and Mumbai, with song sequences in Jordan and Dubai. The film's music was composed by Harris Jayaraj with cinematography by Balasubramaniem and editing by Vivek Harshan.

Oru Kal Oru Kannadi was released on 13 April 2012 and was deemed a major commercial success. Santhanam received numerous accolades for his performance, including an Ananda Vikatan Cinema Award, Chennai Times Film Award and a Vijay Award for Best Comedian. The film itself received three nominations at the Filmfare Awards South, winning Best Male Debut – South (Udhayanidhi) and four nominations at the South Indian International Movie Awards, winning Best Actress – Tamil (Motwani). The film emerged a breakthrough for Udhayanidhi, who continued to act in leading roles in several Tamil films until his eventual retirement from acting in 2023.

== Plot ==
One morning in Chennai, V. Saravanan receives a wedding invitation from his ex-girlfriend, M. Meera, along with a note asking him not to attend. Undeterred, he and his friend Parthasarathy "Partha" drive to Puducherry to stop the wedding. Along the way, Saravanan recalls their past.

Saravanan, a carefree young man working at a film theatre with Partha, comes from a dysfunctional family. His father Varadharajan, a college professor, stopped speaking to his wife Shenbagam the day after their wedding upon learning she was uneducated. Shenbagam now studies to earn a degree and win back his affection.

Saravanan falls in love with Meera, a trainee air hostess, after spotting her in traffic and begins pursuing her despite warnings from her father, DCP D. Mahendrakumar IPS. Meera challenges Saravanan to change himself—shave, dress well, drop Partha, and be punctual—if he wants her love. Saravanan then prioritises Meera over Partha, straining their friendship.

Eventually, Saravanan reunites Partha with his lost love, and the two follow Meera to Mumbai, where Meera admits she loves Saravanan. Meanwhile, Varadharajan reconciles with Shenbagam after Saravanan confronts him.

Later, a misunderstanding causes Meera to believe Saravanan never truly loved her when he jokingly calls their relationship a "project" during a phone call she overhears. Heartbroken, she ends her relationship with him.

In the present, Saravanan and Partha arrive at the wedding, drunkenly sharing their story. Meera sympathises, but Mahendrakumar refuses to let her reunite with Saravanan due to the wedding costs and because she consented to the wedding. Just as Saravanan and Partha are about to leave, a local bigwig Rajini Murugan arrives with his girlfriend and a pregnant girl, revealing that Meera's groom Ashwin had abandoned the pregnant girl. Ashwin initially denies knowing her, but confesses after being cornered. He reunites with her, while Murugan promises to cover the wedding losses. As Saravanan leaves, Meera returns and reunites with him.

== Cast ==
- Udhayanidhi Stalin as V. Saravanan
- Hansika Motwani as M. Meera
- Santhanam as Parthasarathy "Partha"
- Saranya Ponvannan as Shenbagam
- Sayaji Shinde as D. Mahendrakumar IPS
- Azhagam Perumal as R. Varadharajan
- Mahanadi Shankar as T. Angamuthu
- Swaminathan as Ulundurpettai Ulagananthan
- Narayan Lucky as Sanjay
- Vibhu as Ashwin
- Lollu Sabha Seshu as 'Scissors' Selva
- Uma Padmanabhan as M. Gayathri
- Madhumitha as Jangiri

Special appearances

- Andrea Jeremiah as Rajini Murugan's love interest
- Arya as Rajini Murugan
- Dinesh in the song "Kadhal Oru"
- Sneha as Jennifer

== Production ==
=== Development ===
After being impressed by director M. Rajesh's debut film, Siva Manasula Sakthi (2009), producer Udhayanidhi Stalin of Red Giant Movies wanted to act in the director's next film but was informed that he was already directing Boss Engira Bhaskaran (2010). Udhayanidhi ended up buying that film's distribution rights. After he met Rajesh, both decided to collaborate on a new project. Rajesh suggested the title Sumarana Paiyyanum Super Figurum (transl. An ordinary boy, a hot girl), which Udhayanidhi rejected. Despite reports that the film was titled Nanbenda (transl. You are truly my friend), it was later revealed to be Oru Kal Oru Kannadi (OKOK), after a song from Siva Manasula Sakthi. Cinematography was handled by Balasubramaniem, editing by Vivek Harshan, and dance choreography by Dinesh. Rajesh said, "I have shown mistakes committed by both genders in Oru Kal Oru Kannadi . Having said that, I must admit that in real life, most men I know are at fault when it comes to relationships".

=== Casting ===
Though Udhayanidhi made a cameo in Aadhavan (2009), Oru Kal Oru Kannadi is his first proper acting credit. To prepare for his role, he observed Jiiva's mannerisms in Siva Manasula Sakthi. Rajesh cast Hansika Motwani as the lead actress after being impressed with her performance in Engeyum Kadhal (2011). Motwani, a non-Tamil speaker, learned the language at Rajesh's request. Comedian Santhanam renewed his association with Rajesh for the third time. Rajesh noted that while the character of Partha was merely created during scripting, it was only after Santhanam's casting that the character was fleshed out after the actor and director brainstormed. Santhanam revealed that the character's mannerisms were inspired by one of his friends.

Saranya Ponvannan, who plays Udhayanidhi's mother, said that since the film was a comedy, she was insecure and doubted she could meet the pace of Santhanam and Rajesh who specialise in that genre, despite herself having tried comedy in Em Magan (2005) and Kalavani (2010). Narayan Lucky briefly appears as a potential suitor for Motwani's character who ends up ridiculing her. He said Rajesh initially considered Arya or Jiiva for the role, but later decided on Narayan as he wanted to give the scene a "fresh feel". Arya, who made a cameo in Siva Manasula Sakthi and starred in Boss Engira Bhaskaran, made a cameo near the climax, and joked that he was Rajesh's "lucky mascot". Sneha was cast in another cameo, which was reportedly offered to Tamannaah Bhatia, and Andrea Jeremiah reportedly received ₹10 lakh (equivalent to ₹21 lakh or US$21,000 in 2026) for her cameo. Vibhu, who later gained fame for the TV series Ethirneechal, appears briefly as Motwani's groom.

=== Filming ===
A photo shoot featuring Motwani and Udhayanidhi was conducted in February 2011, while principal photography began in mid-March at Chennai. Prior to this, the team conducted rehearsals with Udhayanidhi; Rajesh said, "[Udhayanidhi] acted like a pro. We shot all the scenes on a handycam and were impressed with his performance. He is now clear about his dialogues". The first scene was shot in Madhava Perumal temple, Mylapore. Motwani started filming her scenes on 21 March. Rajesh shot some scenes at Sathyam Cinemas in Chennai due to his affinity for the theatre, having previously filmed a scene there for Siva Manasula Sakthi. By mid-May 2011, the team had completed two schedules of filming, which took place mostly in real locations across Chennai, rather than sets. In June, the team travelled to Madurai for filming a major sequence. Rajesh revealed that though Motwani lost some weight for her role, she later gained additional weight before production could be completed, leading to the inclusion of self-deprecating dialogues about her increased weight.

The team returned to Chennai for filming the climax sequence, held at a resort in East Coast Road. During this schedule, shooting was interrupted due to Chennai-based technician union members' objection to using a Mumbai-based makeup artist for Jeremiah. Udhayanidhi then intervened and asked the makeup artist to leave the set, resulting in the shooting being delayed. The final schedule was held at Mumbai in mid-July 2011; though this coincided with the Mumbai bombings, Rajesh tweeted that they shot at a suburb which was 70 km (43 miles) away from the city. By August, the team shot few patchwork sequences and spoken portions at the Tharamani–OMR stretch. Since they were denied permission to shoot on road because it would obstruct traffic, they shot at Rajiv Gandhi Salai. By October, filming was mostly complete, except for a few sequences set to be canned in overseas locations. That December, the makers travelled to Jordan to shoot a song sequence. Another song sequence was shot in Dubai. By February 2012, filming was mostly complete except for a remaining song sequence.

== Soundtrack ==
The album features five songs, composed by Harris Jayaraj. The audio launch was held at Sathyam Cinemas on 5 March 2012.

== Marketing ==
The film's teaser trailer was attached to the theatrical prints of Udhayanidhi's production 7 Aum Arivu (2011) and subsequently released on the internet on 26 October 2011, coinciding with Diwali. The teaser was viewed over 300,000 times and received praise for Santhanam's comic punchline.

== Release ==
Oru Kal Oru Kannadi was scheduled to release in theatres during the Valentine's Day week in February 2012 but was delayed due to a standoff between the Film Employees Federation of South India and the Tamil Film Producers Council. The film was then released on 13 April 2012, during Puthandu (Tamil New Year), alongside Pachai Engira Kaathu. Udhayanidhi distributed Oru Kal Oru Kannadi via Red Giant Movies.

The film received a U certificate from the Central Board of Film Certification (CBFC), but was not given entertainment tax exemption, despite being eligible. Udhayanidhi blamed this on the seven-member committee having a "political vendetta" against him. The film was dubbed in Telugu under the title OK OK and released in Andhra Pradesh on 31 August 2012.

=== Controversies ===
Ahead of the film's release, a petition was filed by the Hindu Dharma Sakthi demanding the removal of scenes that allegedly hurt Hindu sentiments, based on what the secretary N. Devasenathypathy had seen in the trailer. However, the petition was dismissed, with the judge saying the film had been "certified for universal exhibition" and noting the vagueness in the allegations of the petitioner.

=== Critical reception ===
Sify called the film a "rollicking comedy", stating: "If all you're looking for is a relaxed time at the movies, then, this is Good Fun. Go with your buddies, you'll laugh till you have tears in your eyes". N. Venkateswaran of The Times of India rated it 3.5 out of 5 and said: "M Rajesh is a rarity in Tamil cinema. How else does one explain sitting through almost a three-hour-long movie without realising the passage of time?" A reviewer from The New Indian Express wrote "OKOK may fall short of the director's earlier films. But nevertheless it's a fairly enjoyable fun ride." A critic from Chennai Online wrote that Rajesh proved "that his two earlier successes were no fluke and he does it again by sticking to his tried and tested formula". The critic appreciated the performances of Udhayanidhi and Motwani, and said the "show-stealer" was Santhanam, lauding his humour and one-liners.

Malathi Rangarajan of The Hindu criticised the film for glorifying misogyny and body shaming, finding them unfunny, but concluded, "Repeating the run to the winning post consecutively for the third time isn't easy. Rajesh could achieve it — of course, with a huge contribution from Santhanam". R. S. Prakash of Bangalore Mirror summarised "OK OK is a time-pass affair without the need to rack the brains much." However, Pavithra Srinivasan from Rediff.com rated it 2 out of 5 and said: "OKOK is a slightly torturous friendship story of two guys and that's pretty much it". SV of Deccan Herald wrote, "it's Santhanam's show all the way, who incidentally is OKOK's only saving grace. Minus the man, the movie is the pits. Shy away from this mundane mirth, and if a stone is handy lob at the mirror of loony life and living it showcases".

=== Box office ===
Oru Kal Oru Kannadi opened at number one at the Chennai box office. According to Sify, the film, made on a budget of ₹13 crore (equivalent to ₹27 crore or US$2.8 million in 2026), grossed around ₹25 crore (equivalent to ₹51 crore or US$5.3 million in 2026) worldwide. However, Indo-Asian News Service said the film was made at a cost of less than ₹2 crore (equivalent to ₹4.1 crore or US$430,000 in 2026), and grossed over ₹15.86 crore (equivalent to ₹33 crore or US$3.4 million in 2026) from both the original Tamil and dubbed Telugu versions.

== Accolades ==
Award (Note: Awards, festivals and organisations are in alphabetical order.)	Date of ceremony (Note: Date is linked to the article about the awards held that year, wherever possible.)	Category	Nominee(s)	Result	Ref.
Ananda Vikatan Cinema Awards	16 January 2013	Best Comedian – Male	Santhanam	Won	
Ananda Vikatan Cinema Awards	16 January 2013	Best Comedian – Female	Jangiri Madhumitha	Won	
Chennai Times Film Awards	4 November 2013	Best Actor in a Comic Role	Santhanam	Won	
Edison Awards	10 February 2013	Best Actress	Hansika Motwani	Won	
Filmfare Awards South	20 July 2013	Best Supporting Actor – Tamil	Santhanam	Nominated	
Filmfare Awards South	20 July 2013	Best Supporting Actress – Tamil	Saranya Ponvannan	Nominated	
Filmfare Awards South	20 July 2013	Best Male Debut – South	Udhayanidhi Stalin	Won	
South Indian International Movie Awards	12–13 September 2013	Best Actress – Tamil	Hansika Motwani	Won	
South Indian International Movie Awards	12–13 September 2013	Best Comedian – Tamil	Santhanam	Nominated	
South Indian International Movie Awards	12–13 September 2013	Best Dance Choreographer – Tamil	Dinesh – ("Venaam Machaan")	Nominated	
South Indian International Movie Awards	12–13 September 2013	Best Male Debut – Tamil	Udhayanidhi Stalin	Nominated	
Vijay Awards	11 May 2013	Best Supporting Actress	Saranya Ponvannan	Nominated	
Vijay Awards	11 May 2013	Best Comedian	Santhanam	Won	
Vijay Awards	11 May 2013	Best Debut Actor	Udhayanidhi Stalin	Nominated	
Vijay Awards	11 May 2013	Best Story, Screenplay Writer	M. Rajesh	Nominated	
Vijay Awards	11 May 2013	Best Dialogue	M. Rajesh	Won	
Vijay Awards	11 May 2013	Best Choreographer	Dinesh Kumar – ("Venaam Machaan")	Nominated	
Vijay Awards	11 May 2013	Face of the Year	Udhayanidhi Stalin	Won	
Vijay Awards	11 May 2013	Favorite Film	Oru Kal Oru Kannadi	Nominated	
Vijay Awards	11 May 2013	Favorite Director	M. Rajesh	Nominated	
Vijay Awards	11 May 2013	Favourite Song	"Venaam Machaan"	Nominated	

== Legacy ==
Oru Kal Oru Kannadi's success, along with that of other contemporaneous Tamil films such as Kadhalil Sodhappuvadhu Yeppadi, Marina and Kalakalappu, initiated a short-lived trend of comedy films becoming successful. Trade analyst Sreedhar Pillai noted a shift in Tamil cinema from violent revenge-based films to comedies, which were found to be more commercially viable. The film established Udhayanidhi as a leading actor in Tamil cinema, and propelled his successful acting career until his eventual retirement from acting in 2023 to focus on politics. Udhayanidhi said he intended to quit acting after Oru Kal Oru Kannadi, but decided not to do so due to the film's success. He said this made him believe comedy was his comfort zone, so he acted in more films in that genre. Udhayanidhi eventually found the genre boring, and began acting in more serious films such as Gethu and Manithan (both 2016), hoping to experiment and reinvent himself.

Santhanam's comedy was considered a trendsetting one and was considered important for the film's success. Suresh Kannan in his column for Puthiya Thalaimurai called Partha a modern-day version of the Anniyan character Ambi with his Brahmin customs, body language, costumes of varied colour combinations and Mylapore English standing out from Santhanam's earlier films. Oru Kal Oru Kannadi emerged a breakthrough for Madhumitha, who played the character of Jangiri, and she became known by that name. The film also fetched significant recognition for Narayan.

Despite its success, the film also received criticism for its apparent glorification of misogyny, stalking and body shaming. In a 2024 interview, Rajesh said, "I took cognisance of my comedy scenes not being regarded as funny anymore. I sincerely regret having thought of body shaming and mocking religious beliefs as a way of evoking laughter".
