= Biriyani (film) =

2013 Indian film by Venkat Prabhu

- Theatrical release poster
- Directed by: Venkat Prabhu
- Written by: Venkat Prabhu
- Produced by: K. E. Gnanavel Raja
- Starring: Karthi; Hansika Motwani; Premji
- Cinematography: Sakthi Saravanan
- Edited by: Praveen K. L. N. B. Srikanth
- Music by: Yuvan Shankar Raja
- Production company: Studio Green
- Release date: 20 December 2013
- Running time: 150 minutes
- Country: India
- Language: Tamil

Biriyani is a 2013 Indian Tamil-language black comedy action thriller film directed and written by Venkat Prabhu and produced by Studio Green. It stars Karthi and Hansika Motwani alongside an ensemble cast including Premji, Nassar, Ramki, Sampath Raj, Madhumitha, Jayaprakash, Prem, and Mandy Takhar (in her Tamil debut). Yuvan Shankar Raja composed the score and soundtrack of Biriyani, which marks his 100th film, while Sakthi Saravanan and Praveen-Srikanth handled cinematography and editing, respectively.

Filming started in November 2012, lasted for over nine months and took place primarily at Chennai, Hyderabad and Ambur.

Biriyani was released on 20 December 2013 to mixed-to-positive reviews from critics. The film was reported to be inspired by the 2004 American film Harold & Kumar Go To White Castle, though Prabhu was lauded for making creative changes to the story. The film became a commercial success and recovered its budget at the box-office.

== Plot ==
The movie starts with Sugan and his friend Parasuram being chased by cops. The flashback shows Sugan as a womanizer who has a weakness for biryani. Parasuram is his childhood friend. Sugan's womanizing always gets him into fights with his girlfriend Priyanka. Sugan and Parasuram attend a function for a branch opening of one of their offices, where they meet Varadharajan, the chief guest for the ceremony. In the meantime, it is shown that CBI officer Riyaz Ahmed has been deputed to track Varadharajan's illegal activities. Varadharajan is impressed with Sugan and later decides to make him his son-in-law; this decision gets him into an argument with his elder son-in-law Vijaykrishna.

Varadharajan later hosts a cocktail party and invites Sugan and Parasuram, where they get drunk. After getting drunk, Sugan, who craves biryani, searches for a biryani shop. There, they both come across Maya, a prostitute. The very next day, they find police cars searching for Varadharajan, who is missing. Meanwhile, Sugan and Parasuram find Varadharajan's corpse in their car trunk. They are blamed for Varadharajan's death and are chased by the police, which is the starting scene of the movie.

Sugan and Parasu go to their friend's house, and Parasu sends a picture of Maya to his friends. The next day, one of their friends finds Maya at Egmore Railway Station. Sugan arrives, and Maya confesses that she spiked their drinks upon a police officer's orders. As Sugan tries to get more information, a female cop stops Maya from telling the truth and later kills her. Back at home, Sugan gets a message from the female cop, which makes him realize that she is not a police officer but an assassin. Her next victim is none other than Sugan's sister Varalakshmi. At the temple, Sugan's friend Hari, brother-in-law Subbu, and Varalakshmi get into a car accident orchestrated by Vijaykrishna, and the female assassin captures Varalakshmi. Sugan gets a call from Vijaykrishna that he needs Varadharajan alive so that he can give Varalakshmi back to Sugan.

Sugan decides that Parasu should impersonate Varadharajan alive since the real Varadharajan is dead. He comes there with Parasu but finds the assassin trying to kill Sugan. Vijaykrishna wants Varadharajan back, but it was not he who called Sugan. Sugan and Vijaykrishna get into a fight along with Sampath, who gets into a fight with the hitwoman. Another police officer, ACP Vikram, kills the female assassin and returns Varalakshmi safely. A few days later, at Varadharajan's funeral, Sugan learns the truth about Varadharajan's death. A man named Avinash was in love with Varadharajan's daughter only for money, but Sugan and Parasu inadvertently stopped their love on the way to the new branch opening.

Avinash uses his brother to get his love back by bringing Sugan and Parasu using Maya, and Maya used drugs to make Sugan and Parasu very drunk. Then the assassin arrives and kills Maya, so she does not tell Sugan the truth. Sugan figures out that Avinash's brother, who is none other than Vikram, was behind everything. Soon, Riyaz and Vijaykrishna also find out the truth. Riyaz tells Sugan to kill Vikram, Sugan fights with Vikram, and they both fall from the office into the swimming pool below. What happens to either of them is unknown.

== Cast ==
- Karthi as Sugan
- Hansika Motwani as Priyanka
- Ramki as Vijay Krishna
- Nassar as Varadharajan Mudaliar
- Prem as ACP Vikram
- Sampath Raj as CBI Officer Riyaz Ahmed
- Premji as Parasuram
- Subbu Panchu as Subbu
- Madhumitha as Varalakshmi
- Jayaprakash as AC Sampath
- Mandy Takhar as Maya
- Nithin Sathya as Hari
- Uma Riyaz Khan as Hitwoman
- Shanmugasundaram as Kasi Vishwanathan
- J. Livingston as Thomas
- Vijayalakshmi as Rohini
- Tharika as Kalpana
- Rethika Srinivas as Revathi
- Badava Gopi as Gopi
- Sam Anderson as Sam
- Haanii Shivraj as Shwetha
- Ravikanth as Chandrasekhar
- Leena Maria Paul as Sree Devi
- Sangeetha Gopal as Shanthi
- Mithun Maheswaran as Kiran
- Rajkumar Pitchumani as Avinash's friend

Special appearances by

- Jai as Jai Kanth
- Aravind Akash as himself
- Ashwin Kakumanu as himself
- Mahat Raghavendra as himself
- Vaibhav as himself
- Vijay Vasanth as himself
- Sakthi Saravanan as doctor
- Venkat Prabhu as himself

== Production ==
=== Development ===
Following the release of Mankatha, Venkat Prabhu was reported to be writing a script for Suriya. In December 2011, he was signed up by Studio Green, the production company owned by Suriya's cousin K. E. Gnanavelraja, while later the month the director informed that Suriya had agreed to be part of his next film, which he was planning to shoot in 3D. Further more, the media carried reports that it would be a bilingual, made simultaneously in Tamil and Telugu, and feature Telugu actor Ravi Teja, Sonam Kapoor and Taapsee Pannu in other lead roles.

In April 2012, while Venkat Prabhu was still working on the script, giving it the final touch, Suriya chose to work with director Hari on the sequel to his Singam first after completing Maattrraan, which prompted Venkat Prabhu to make another film for Studio Green instead with Suriya's brother Karthi in the lead. The film was named Biriyani, and the director stated that the same team of his previous four films, comprising music composer Yuvan Shankar Raja, cinematographer Sakthi Saravanan, editors Praveen K. L. and N. B. Srikanth and costume designer Vasuki Bhaskar, would work on Biriyani. The film was launched on 16 July 2012 after a small pooja, but filming did not start until November 2012, since Venkat Prabhu was reworking his script and the casting was not finished yet. He made it clear that the film planned with Suriya earlier was an "entirely different script", and that he would work on that project later, while revealing that Biriyani's script was initially intended for actor Vijay.

=== Casting ===
Venkat Prabhu's brother Premgi Amaren, who had been part of all his brother's ventures, was given an "almost parallel role" as the lead character's best friend in Biriyani. For the lead female role, the production team first approached Samantha. Bollywood actresses Parineeti Chopra and Ileana D'Cruz were also considered for the role, but in early July 2012, Bengali actress Richa Gangopadhyay was selected for the role, who said that she played "a typical girl in it; someone who's mischievous and not-so innocent". However, she left the project by mid-October 2012 due to "changes in the role and script". After Gangopadhyay's exit, Venkat Prabhu expressed interest in casting Nayantara for the role. while later the month Hansika Motwani was finalized to play the leading lady of the film. Motwani told that she played a journalist named Priyanka, while classifying the film as a "black comedy thriller".

Sources reported that the film had two female leads and that Neetu Chandra had been approached to play the other lead. Venkat Prabhu was also keen on casting Bollywood actress Diana Penty for the role, which finally went to British Indian model and actress in Punjabi films, Mandy Takhar, who said that she played a "strong, modern girl", describing her character as "sexy and sensuous", that she said was "not what I am". Takhar, who Venkat Prabhu zeroed in after seeing her photos from her Hindi film Bumboo, added that she had allotted 20 days of shooting for the film, had to put on weight for the role and had done a pole dance in the song "Mississippi". Further more, sources indicated that the newly married couple Sneha and Prasanna had been roped in for the film, although Venkat Prabhu refused to comment about this. Later, in an interview to The Hindu, Prasanna stated that he played an important role in it. Ramki was recruited in November 2012 for an important role. Meena was also approached by the director to play a pivotal role, but she declined the offer. Nithin Sathya and Sampath Raj, two regulars in Venkat Prabhu's films, joined the cast in December 2012. Later additions to the cast included Prem, television actor and mimic Badava Gopi, playing the role of a cameraman, Uma Riyaz Khan, Madhumitha, Bangalore socialite Sangeetha Gopal, and Sam Anderson. Reports suggested that Canadian film critic Review Raja had done a dance number choreographed by Shobhi during his visit in Chennai.

=== Filming ===
The film's principal photography was to start in August 2012, but was delayed because of changes in the script and the cast. It was then supposed to begin by early October 2012 in Ambur, but was officially commenced on 5 November 2012, following a test shoot on 1 November. The first day of shoot involved scenes between Karthi and Premji, which was carried out on a set inside a house near the Kodambakkam railway station in Chennai. The short Chennai schedule was followed by schedules in Senji, Ambur and Pondicherry. A set of a hotel worth ₹ 1 crore was erected in Chennai, where action scenes and songs were shot for the film. Motion capture technology was used to film a fight sequence involving Karthi, Nitin Sathya, Murugadas and Panchu Subbu which was shot with a multiple camera setup at Puducherry. The unit then took a break as Karthi moved on to shoot his other film All in All Azhagu Raja simultaneously, and filming was continued on 30 March 2013 in Hyderabad. 60% of the film had been completed at that time, according to the director.

Vijay Vasanth, Vaibhav Reddy, Ashwin Kakumanu, Aravind Akash and Mahat Raghavendra, who had all been part of Venkat Prabhu's Mankatha, dropped by Hyderabad for a day to take part in the shooting. Although a 14-day schedule was planned in Hyderabad, the unit returned within three days to Chennai, after facing with opposition from the stunt union of Andhra Pradesh. The crew was allowed to shoot a fight sequence on a train, for which ₹ 40 lakh had been paid in advance, after which they returned to Chennai and resume the shoot there, where new sets had been created at the AVM studios, the Binny Mills and the Rajiv Gandhi Salai (OMR). Venkat Prabhu further said that the crew would be heading to Spain and Portugal in May to shoot two songs involving Karthi and Hansika. By mid-June, the entire talkie portion had been canned. The final song, choreographed by Kalyan, was shot in July 2013. Although the team had planned to shoot the song in a foreign country, it was eventually filmed in Meenambakkam, Chennai, where two sets had been created, with Venkat Prabhu intending to shoot the song in the style of a Broadway musical, who went on to add that "the backgrounds in the song will keep changing throughout".

== Soundtrack ==
Yuvan Shankar Raja composed the soundtrack and film score for Biriyani, continuing his association with Venkat Prabhu, which will be his 100th film. Prabhu has stated that the soundtrack album will have "at least 8 to 9 songs". Besides poet Vaali and the director's father Gangai Amaren, who regularly work in Prabhu's films, Niranjan Bharathi, who penned the song "Nee Naan" in the director's previous venture Mankatha, and Madhan Karky were brought on board to write the lyrics, the latter collaborating the first time with Yuvan Shankar Raja. After being convinced by the director, film's lead actor Karthi agreed to sing a song titled "Mississippi" for the soundtrack, making his debut in playback singing, which was recorded in December 2012. In late July 2013, four leading contemporary music directors, G. V. Prakash Kumar, S. Thaman, Vijay Antony and D. Imman, were roped in to sing the number "Thirumbi Vaa", which was termed as a "motivational song" by the director. Two remixes were produced by Yuvan Shankar Raja himself, for the first time remixing his own composition, and Premgi Amaren, respectively. The audio rights of the soundtrack were acquired by Sony Music in May 2013. On 16 August, the audio tracks were leaked online causing an uproar from the team. It was later announced that, due to the leak, the planned audio launch was subsequently cancelled and that the album would be directly released to stores on 21 August 2013. But the audio launch eventually happened at an undisclosed FM station on 21 August. The audio received positive response from critics as well as audience.

== Marketing ==
Although costume designer Vasuki Baskar wrote on her social media account that the first look of the film would be released on 13 November, during the Diwali festival, it was unveiled on 15 December 2012 at Yuvan Shankar Raja's concert in Malaysia. A 75-second teaser of the film was released on 25 May 2013, on the occasion of Karthi's birthday.

== Release ==
The satellite rights of the film were sold to Sun TV. Studio Green initially finalised 6 September 2013 as the release date, to be coinciding with the 2013 Vinayagar Chaturthi festival. The makers then planned to release the film on 11 October 2013 coinciding with Dusshera festival But the date was changed to January 2014, and later to 20 December 2013. In early August 2013, ATMUS Entertainment announced that it had acquired the US theatrical screening rights for the film. The film was given U/A certificate by the Censor Board. The film's producer initially went to the revision committee to get a U certificate to enjoy the benefit of entertainment tax exemption, but the committee rejected the appeal and awarded the film with a U/A certificate.

Biriyani released in 1050 screens worldwide on 20 December 2013 with tough competition from Dhoom 3 and Endrendrum Punnagai.

== Critical reception ==
Biriyani received positive reviews from critics. Among the positive reviews were from The Times of India gave 3.5 stars out of 5 and wrote, "Venkat Prabhu definitely knows how to have a cake and eat it too. Fun is certainly the core of all his movies, even when the genres are varied. That is the case with Biriyani as well. It is essentially a murder mystery but Venkat seasons it with his brand of wink wink nudge nudge filmmaking, and turns it into an engaging entertainer". Behindwoods gave 3.25 stars out of 5 and wrote, "Venkat Prabhu's Biriyani while adhering to the director's recipe, has humor, suspense, music, action and glamour in delectable portions resulting in a delicious product". Rediff gave 2.5 stars out of 5 and wrote, "Though the film takes its own sweet time to get a move on, once it gathers momentum, there is no stopping till the end, where there is an exciting climax, as well as an anticlimax, in typical Venkat Prabhu style", calling it "a fun-filled thriller". Indiaglitz gave 3.5 out of 5 and wrote, "Through the first half the ingredients make up a commercial pot boiler and the build up to the story is slow and steady. The last 20 minutes serves the twist in the tale, and a round of applause to the director to have correlated the events of 2 hours in the final climax". The Hindu wrote, "Intelligent line, sensible humour, particularly at the most unexpected moments, Sakthi Saravanan's contribution with the lens, Silva's noteworthy action choreography and Karthi's energy are scoring points of this Venkat Prabhu offering. Youth should find the Biriyani quite tasty". hindustantimes wrote, "this Biriyani is hard to digest."

Sify wrote, "Biriyani is the blandest one you must have had in recent times. The larger problem here is that this film doesn't have the crackle and pop of a rom-com, a thriller or even cleverly written comic lines". IANS gave 2.5 stars out of 5 and wrote, "Venkat Prabhu's Biriyani despite being fairly satisfying is not excellent because it gets too starchy due to unwanted ingredients. While the use of situational comedy works to some extent but what we see in some scenes is not humorous but downright awful and the double entendres directed at women are uncalled for".

Another reviewer from The Hindu wrote, "It's (the) irreverent fun that makes this film different from regular thrillers. Despite some good ingredients and reasonably good cooking methods, there's something that doesn’t come together and stops this from being a delectable meal". The New Indian Express wrote, "Venkat Prabhu's Biriyani falls flat and struggles to make an impact with the audience with a nonsensical love story and even worse thriller plot. The director's attempt at infusing some comedy as well, fails, with crass jokes on women that are almost nauseating to watch".
