= Vivek Harshan =

Indian film editor

- Born: Vivek Harshan; 28 May 1981 (age 45); India
- Occupation: Film Editor
- Years active: 2007–present

Vivek Harshan (born 28 May 1981) is an Indian film editor who works predominantly in Malayalam and Tamil films. He has frequently collaborated with Amal Neerad, M. Rajesh, and Karthik Subbaraj since the beginning of their careers. Big B (2007), Jigarthanda (2014), Iyobinte Pusthakam (2014), Varathan (2018), Bheeshma Parvam (2022), Aavesham (2024), Manjummel Boys (2024) and Sikandar (2025) are some of his notable works. He won the National Film Award for Best Editing in 2014 for Jigarthanda.

== Film career ==
After assisting editor Anthony, Harshan started working as an independent editor with the Malayalam film Red Salute (2006). He got break in his second film Big B (2007). His work on the 2014 Tamil film Jigarthanda got him the National Award for that year.

== Filmography ==
Year	Title	Language	Notes
2006	Red Salute	Malayalam	
2007	Big B	Malayalam	
2009	Sagar Alias Jackie Reloaded	Malayalam	
2009	Siva Manasula Sakthi	Tamil	
2010	Boss Engira Bhaskaran	Tamil	
2010	Anwar	Malayalam	
2012	Oru Kal Oru Kannadi	Tamil	
2012	22 Female Kottayam	Malayalam	
2012	Josettante Hero	Malayalam	
2012	Bachelor Party	Malayalam	
2013	5 Sundarikal	Malayalam	
2013	Maryan	Tamil	
2013	Varuthapadatha Valibar Sangam	Tamil	
2013	All in All Azhagu Raja	Tamil	
2014	Jigarthanda	Tamil	
2014	Peruchazhi	Malayalam	
2014	Burma	Tamil	
2015	Kaaki Sattai	Tamil	
2015	Vasuvum Saravananum Onna Padichavanga	Tamil	
2015	Nannbenda	Tamil	
2016	Rajini Murugan	Tamil	
2016	Kali	Malayalam	
2016	Iraivi	Tamil	
2016	Puthiya Niyamam	Malayalam	
2016	Jackson Durai	Tamil	
2016	Nambiar	Tamil	
2016	Kadavul Irukaan Kumaru	Tamil	
2016	Vallavanukku Vallavan	Tamil	
2017	Ezra	Malayalam	
2017	Mupparimanam	Tamil	
2017	Ramaleela	Malayalam	
2018	Mercury	Tamil	
2018	Seema Raja	Tamil	
2018	Mandharam	Malayalam	
2018	Varathan	Malayalam	
2019	Petta	Tamil	
2019	Irupathiyonnaam Noottaandu	Malayalam	
2019	Mr. Local	Tamil	
2019	Love Action Drama	Malayalam	
2019	Adithya Varma	Tamil	
2020	Putham Pudhu Kaalai	Tamil	Segment: Miracle
2021	Jagame Thandhiram	Tamil	
2021	Navarasa	Tamil	Segment: Peace
2021	Kasada Thapara	Tamil	Streaming release; Segment: Kavasam
2021	MGR Magan	Tamil	
2021	Kurup	Malayalam	
2022	Mahaan	Tamil	
2022	Bheeshma Parvam	Malayalam	
2022	DSP	Tamil	
2023	Vallavanukkum Vallavan	Tamil	
2023	Bandra	Malayalam	
2024	Manjummel Boys	Malayalam	
2024	Aavesham	Malayalam	
2024	Bougainvillea	Malayalam	
2025	Sikandar	Hindi	
2026	Balan - The Boy	Malayalam	
2026	Udumbanchola Vision	Malayalam	
2026	Dhoomakethu	Malayalam	
2026	Bachelor Party D'eux	Malayalam	

== Awards ==
=== National Film Awards ===
- 2014 – National Film Award for Best Editing for Jigarthanda

=== Vijay Awards ===
- 2014 – Vijay Award for Best Editor for Jigarthanda
