= Vanakkam Da Mappilei =

2019 Tamil-language romantic comedy film

- Official release poster
- Directed by: M. Rajesh
- Written by: M. Rajesh
- Produced by: Kalanithi Maran
- Starring: G. V. Prakash Kumar; Amritha Aiyer; Anandaraj
- Cinematography: Siddharth Ranganathan
- Edited by: Ashish Joseph
- Music by: G. V. Prakash Kumar
- Production company: Sun Entertainment
- Distributed by: Sun NXT
- Release date: 16 April 2021
- Running time: 162 minutes
- Country: India
- Language: Tamil

Vanakkam Da Mappilei also spelt as Vanakkam Da Mappillai (transl. Greetings Friend) is a 2021 Indian Tamil-language romantic comedy film written and directed by M. Rajesh. The film stars G. V. Prakash Kumar, Amritha Aiyer and Anandaraj. It had a direct-to-streaming release via Sun NXT on 16 April 2021.

== Plot ==
Aravind and Swaminathan, childhood friends, vow to get married on the same stage. Aravind works on a ship, spending half the year away, while Swami runs a travel agency. Swami’s wedding is arranged with his cousin, but sensing Aravind’s longing for companionship, he agrees to postpone the wedding for six months, hoping both friends will find suitable brides.

As the months pass, Aravind struggles to attract interest due to his job. Each rejection weighs on him, amplifying his insecurities about being unworthy of love. One day, he meets Thulasi, a vibrant and spirited woman who, despite her initial hesitations, finds herself drawn to Aravind’s charm and sincerity.

Thulasi is deeply connected to her father, Ramachandran, a widower who has raised her alone since her mother’s passing. Their bond is strong, and Thulasi fears the prospect of leaving him behind after marriage. When she introduces Aravind to Ramachandran, both men hit it off, but Ramachandran expresses a heartfelt condition: he wants Aravind to find a bride for himself first, believing it will bring him happiness in his twilight years.

Determined, Aravind and Swami embark on a quest to find a bride for Ramachandran. They consider their yoga master, Maya, but the match fails. In a twist of fate, Ramachandran visits a spiritual center where he unexpectedly meets a foreigner. They share an instant connection and eventually marry, lifting a burden from Aravind's shoulders.

However, when Aravind proposes to have their weddings on the same stage, Thulasi refuses, feeling it undermines her father’s journey to find love. Her rejection leaves Aravind feeling betrayed and angry, leading to a painful breakup. Swami, seeing his friend’s despair, suggests marrying another cousin, but when they visit Swami’s uncle, they discover both cousins are already wed, deepening Swami’s frustration and heartbreak.

Feeling lost, Swami decides to pursue a spiritual path, journeying toward Varanasi in search of meaning. Meanwhile, Aravind, grappling with his own heartache, is haunted by memories of Thulasi. Just as hope seems dim, he runs into Thulasi at a pre-wedding reception he organizes for himself and Swami. They confront their feelings and misunderstandings, realizing their love remains strong.

At the same event, Swami unexpectedly reconnects with Preeti, his college ex-lover, reigniting their old flame. With renewed purpose, both couples agree to marry on the same stage as originally planned. The day arrives, filled with joy and celebration, as Aravind and Thulasi, along with Swami and Preeti, affirm their love and friendship in a heartwarming culmination of their intertwined journeys.

== Cast ==
- G. V. Prakash Kumar as Aravind
- Amritha Aiyer as Thulasi
- Daniel Annie Pope as Swaminathan, Aravind's friend
- Anandaraj as Ramachandran (Rams / Adyar "Undertaker"), Thulasi's father
- M. S. Bhaskar as Councillor Puniyakotti
- Jayaprakash as Natraj, Aravind's father
- Pragathi as Shanthi, Aravind's mother
- Reshma Pasupuleti as Maya
- Shiv Aditya as Aakash
- R. S. Shivaji as Swaminathan's grandfather
- Soundarya Bala Nandakumar as Preeti
- Deepa Balu as Divya, Thulasi's friend
- Gowthami Vembunathan as Kannamma
- Guru Ramesh as Madhushudhan
- A. Revathy as Swaminathan's grandmother's
- Poorni as Receptionist
- Yogi Babu as himself (Guest appearance)

== Production ==
The film marked the second collaboration between director M. Rajesh and G. V. Prakash Kumar after Kadavul Irukaan Kumaru (2016). The film was titled as Vanakkam Da Mappilei based on the popular TikTok meme created by a netizen which became viral during the COVID-19 lockdown in Tamil Nadu. Filming was 60% complete as of January 2021.

== Soundtrack ==
The soundtrack was composed by G. V. Prakash Kumar, collaborating with Rajesh for the second time after Kadavul Irukaan Kumaru. The first single "Tata Bye Bye" was sung by actor Dhanush, and the lyrics were penned by Gana Vinoth.

Track listing
| No. | Title | Lyrics | Singer(s) | Length |
|---|---|---|---|---|
| 1. | "Tata Bye Bye" | Gana Vinoth | Dhanush | 4:01 |
| 2. | "Nanban Mattum Pothum Da" | Saravedi Saran | Arivu, Saravedi Saran | 3:24 |
| 3. | "Hey Penne" | Pa. Vijay | G. V. Prakash Kumar | 4:29 |
| 4. | "Ithana Naala Yaarum" | Snehan | G. V. Prakash Kumar, Prathima Dinesh | 3:15 |
| Total length: | | | | 15:09 |

== Release ==
It was originally planned that the film would be having its direct-to-television premiere on Sun TV on 14 April 2021, Puthandu (Tamil New Year). However, the filmmakers later pushed the release date to 1 May 2021, May Day. Later this plan was dropped; instead, the film directly released via Sun NXT on 16 April 2021. The film had its television premiere on 12 May 2021 on the eve of Ramzan.

== Critical reception ==
Ashutosh Mohan of Film Companion wrote, "Imagine all the good fun Rajesh can whip up, if only he was not so obsessed with soup boys and rich girls. But if you find it amusing that the hero and his friend are called Aravind and Swami, then Vannakkamda Mappilei is your fix." Bhuvanesh Chandar of Cinema Express wrote, "With too many issues and no takeaways, Vanakkam Da Mappilei has nothing worth rooting for". Ananda Vikatan criticised the film for being unfunny, with only Yogi Babu and Anandaraj being able to evoke laughter.
