= Boss Engira Bhaskaran =

- Theatrical release poster
- Directed by: M. Rajesh
- Written by: M. Rajesh
- Produced by: K. S. Sreenivasan
- Starring: Arya; Nayanthara; Santhanam
- Cinematography: Sakthi Saravanan
- Edited by: Vivek Harshan
- Music by: Yuvan Shankar Raja
- Production company: Vasan Visual Ventures
- Distributed by: Red Giant Movies; The Show People; Ayngaran International
- Release date: 10 September 2010
- Running time: 161 minutes
- Country: India
- Language: Tamil

Boss Engira Bhaskaran (transl. Boss alias Bhaskaran) is a 2010 Indian Tamil-language romantic comedy film written and directed by M. Rajesh. The film stars Arya, Nayanthara and Santhanam, with Subbu Panchu, Chitra Lakshmanan, Rajendran, Ashvin Raja, Vijayalakshmi and Lakshmy Ramakrishnan in supporting roles. It revolves around an unemployed man who lives an easygoing life, neglecting his career and future. When he meets a woman with whom he falls in love, he decides to change his lifestyle, to marry her eventually.

Boss Engira Bhaskaran was produced by K. S. Sreenivasan and features music scored by Yuvan Shankar Raja, editing handled by Vivek Harshan and cinematography by Sakthi Saravanan. The film, shot between December 2009 and August 2010, was released on 10 September 2010 and became commercially successful. It was remade in Kannada as Parijatha (2011).

== Plot ==
Bhaskaran "Boss" is a happy-go-lucky youth in Kumbakonam who is yet to complete his B. A. Degree, writing arrear examinations for years. His only friend, Nallathambi, owns a saloon which he received as a dowry for marrying a woman who was two months pregnant. Boss, during an arrear examination, happens to meet Chandrika, a lecturer and instantly gets attracted to her, though she disapproves of him because he attempted to copy during an examination she was invigilating.

Boss lives with his widowed mother Sivakami, elder brother Saravanan, and younger sister Nithya, a college student. When Saravanan falls in love with, and marries Nandhini, Boss discovers that Nandhini's younger sister is Chandrika. Though Chandrika is older than him, he wishes to marry her. He proposes to her and she mocks him but he remains resolute. When he approaches her family for the alliance, his unemployment is repeatedly mentioned, rankling him, so he leaves his house to prove himself.

Boss faces many obstacles in his path to prove himself. He is insulted by Chandrika's father, Shanmugasundaram, and does not even have a place to live. After many difficulties, Boss, with the support of Nallathambi, establishes a tutorial centre for Class X students. Nallathambi gets money from Velpandi, a local don, who signs an agreement that if his son Paalpandi does not pass the examination, he will take Nallathambi's property and make him work in his cow dung place.

Velpandi reveals his family history: his father, in his Class X examination, forced his teacher to write the examination. Velpandi, during his exam, wrote only four words in his paper with an aruval symbol, blackmailing the teacher into making him pass or risk being killed. Paalpandi sleeps in the examination hall and if anybody tries to wake him, he will bite the teacher's hand. However, Paalpandi eventually starts to study and makes others listen in the class when Boss appoints a blind teacher. Despite early setbacks, Boss makes a very heavy profit on the deal, while his students top the examinations in the state and Paalpandi passes the examination with favourable marks. Velpandi tears the agreement, offers Nallathambi a huge amount of money with no interest, and appreciates him for making Paalpandi pass the exams. It also convinces Chandrika, who eventually reciprocates his love. However, Shanmugasundaram opposes their marriage as he had once been insulted by Nallathambi and Boss as revenge for not having sanctioned a loan to Boss.

Shiva, a supposed teetotaller and the son of a businessman who is Shanmugasundram's friend is introduced as Chandrika's prospective groom. Boss then confronts Shiva, revealing to him that he loves Chandrika. The two get into a fight soon after, but when Shanmugasundaram arrives at the spot, he learns the truth: Shiva and Boss are now friends and the whole fight was just a drama set by Nallathambi. Shiva supports Boss and Chandrika. Under Shiva and Boss's orders, a disappointed Shanmugasundaram is forced to unite Boss and Chandrika. It is revealed that M. Rajesh called Shiva and told him to stop fighting and unite Boss and Chandrika.

== Cast ==
- Arya as Bhaskaran "Boss"
- Nayanthara as Chandrika
- Santhanam as "Thala Thalapathy" Nallathambi
- Subbu Panchu as Saravanan
- Chitra Lakshmanan as Shanmugasundaram
- Rajendran as Velpandi
- Swaminathan as Venkat
- Ashvin Raja as Paalpandi
- Vijayalakshmi as Nandhini Saravanan
- Lakshmy Ramakrishnan as Sivakami
- Shakeela as Parimala (guest appearance)
- Monisha as Nithya
- Jiiva as Shiva (guest appearance)
- Annapoorani as the blind teacher (uncredited)
- M. Rajesh as himself (voice; uncredited)

== Production ==
After the release of his directorial debut Siva Manasula Sakthi (2009), M. Rajesh decided to make his next film with Arya, who appeared in a cameo in Siva Manasula Sakthi, in the lead role. Rajesh said he chose the title Boss Engira Bhaskaran as he felt it was a "common practice to call everyone as Boss these days". Arya revealed that the script went through changes during production, with Rajesh eventually opting not to include portions where the lead character's brother gets killed. Instead of implementing a revenge script, Rajesh chose to make it a full-length comedy. Rajesh cast Nayanthara as the lead actress after being impressed with her performance in Yaaradi Nee Mohini (2008), and Lakshmy Ramakrishnan as Arya's mother after being impressed with her performance in Naadodigal (2009). Subbu Panchu sought a role in the film, and was cast as the lead character's brother.

The film was officially launched on 19 November 2009 at AVM Studios, with principal photography beginning in the first week of December. It was shot at various locations including Chennai, Kumbakonam, Mysore, Thanjavur and Trichy. Shooting also took place at the Swiss Alps, for some song sequences. Rajesh lauded Nayanthara's dedication to the film and punctuality, contrary to rumours of her being unruly during film shoots, and said the only issue he had with her was that she would often arrive too early, even before the shooting location was ready. Principal photography ended on 3 August 2010 with the completion of a song sequence that was canned at a set erected at Binny Mills near Chennai. While Vasan Visual Ventures that produced Arya's Naan Kadavul, produced this film as well, Arya purchased the rights in the midst to release it under his own production banner The Show People. The film's distribution rights, however, were later acquired by Red Giant Movies, then led by Udhayanidhi Stalin.

== Soundtrack ==
The music of Boss Engira Bhaskaran was composed by Yuvan Shankar Raja, with lyrics by Na. Muthukumar. The soundtrack album was released on 27 August 2010 at Sathyam Cinemas. Karthik of Milliblog wrote, "Boss (A) Baskaran is one of those soundtracks where Yuvan sounds largely uninterested and churns out material that belies his true potential. That is unfortunate".

Track listing
No.	Title	Singer(s)	Length
1.	"Ada Boss Boss"	Sathyan	3:59
2.	"Yaar Intha Penthan"	Haricharan	5:04
3.	"Thathi Thaavum Paper Naan"	Karthik	4:44
4.	"Iyley Iyley"	Vijay Prakash	5:04
5.	"Mama Mama"	Vijay Yesudas, Shweta Mohan	4:18
Total length:			23:09

== Release ==
Boss Engira Bhaskaran was released on 10 September 2010. Despite not being eligible for entertainment tax relief due to the presence of a non-Tamil word in the title, the makers still sought it, alleging that "Boss" was a diminutive of the lead character's name Bhaskaran. In November 2011, it was shown at the International Tamil Film Festival held in Uglich, Russia, alongside Thillana Mohanambal (1968), Chandramukhi (2005), Sivaji: The Boss (2007), Angadi Theru (2010), Thenmerku Paruvakaatru (2010) and Ko (2011).

=== Box office ===
Boss Engira Bhaskaran sold 7.3 million tickets worldwide. It released on Eid day, the end of Ramadan, opening across 240 screens in Tamil Nadu with reportedly 95.5% average theatre occupancy, which, according to trade sources, was the best ever first day opening for Arya then, which resulted in an increase of the number of shows and screens. In its opening weekend, the film was said to have earned ₹65 lakh in Chennai, as reported by Sify. At the end of the second weekend, the film had netted ₹10 crore from 275 screens. According to an estimate by journalist Sridevi Sreedhar, the film, made on a budget of ₹6 crore, collected ₹20 crore as of late September 2010.

=== Critical response ===
Sify stated that "Rajesh has pulled off the impossible, making a family comedy work a second time armed with nothing more than a few situational gaffes and couple of funny dialogues. It's pure escapist fare and will work big time, as there is paucity of healthy entertainment for the family audiences." Chennai Online specially pointed out the plus points of the film "The comic scenes aided by dialogues and the bonding between the two friends are a huge plus and reason enough to see the movie. The casting of each character has been aptly done with no room for excess anywhere making for one smooth ride all through. Nayan and Arya make an adequate pair though there are no great sparks of chemistry between them. However Nayan does make a pretty picture throughout". Bhama Devi Ravi from The Times of India gave 3 out of 5 and said, "Director Rajesh has hit upon a surefire formula to get families audience tripping into theatres during the holiday weekend", and appreciated it for taking "a slight dig at the formulaic films [...] The tutorial college angle may be predictable, but soon humour is back on track, and it is enjoyable. You will also come away with some amazing performances".

== Accolades ==
Event	Category	Recipient	Result	Ref.
58th Filmfare Awards South	Best Actress	Nayanthara	Nominated	
58th Filmfare Awards South	Best Supporting Actor	Santhanam	Nominated	
5th Vijay Awards	Best Comedian	Santhanam	Won	
5th Vijay Awards	Favorite Heroine	Nayanthara	Nominated	

== Legacy ==
Boss Engira Bhaskaran became a major breakthrough for Arya. The dialogue "Nannbenda" (transl. You are truly my friend) spoken by Santhanam in the film became famous and went viral after release. It inspired the title of a 2015 film directed by Jagadish, a former associate of Rajesh, and again featuring Santhanam. Another term used by Santhanam in the film, "Appatakkar" (transl. Know-all) also gained popularity.
