= Brother (2024 Indian film) =

- Theatrical release poster
- Directed by: M. Rajesh
- Written by: M. Rajesh
- Produced by: Sundar Arumugam
- Starring: Ravi Mohan; Priyanka Mohan; Natty Subramaniam; Bhumika Chawla
- Cinematography: Vivekanand Santhosham
- Edited by: David Joseph
- Music by: Harris Jayaraj
- Production company: Screen Scene Media Entertainment Pvt. Ltd.
- Distributed by: Ayngaran International
- Release date: 31 October 2024
- Running time: 140 minutes
- Country: India
- Language: Tamil

Brother is a 2024 Indian Tamil-language comedy drama film written and directed by M. Rajesh, and produced by Sundar Arumugam under the banner of Screen Scene Media Entertainment lootherPvt. Ltd. The film stars Ravi Mohan and Priyanka Mohan in the lead roles.

The film was officially announced in August 2022 under the tentative title JR 30, and the official title was announced in September 2023. Principal photography commenced in August 2022 and was completed by early 2024. The music was composed by Harris Jayaraj, cinematography was handled by Vivekanand Santhosham, and editing by Ashish Joseph.

Brother was released worldwide in theatres on 31 October 2024, coinciding with Diwali. The film received mixed reviews from critics and audiences and was a box-office bomb.

== Plot ==
Karthik, a dropout law student, is the troublesome son of Kumarasamy and Saraswathi. His penchant for questioning injustices often lands him in controversy. After complaining about his apartment's condition, his neighbors confront his family, exacerbating his father's high blood pressure. His elder sister, Anandhi, tries to reform Karthik by taking him to her in-laws' strict, schedule-driven household in Ooty.

Anandhi's sister-in-law, Archana, secures him a job as a hospital bouncer, but Karthik is terminated for confronting a patient's relative about exploiting the elderly man's wealth. Anandhi then finds Karthik a job as a PT teacher at her school, but he clashes with the math teacher and is dismissed. The family's caretaker, Keshav, arranges a psychiatric consultation with Dr. Phoenix Pushparaja, but Keshav's leg injury derails the plan, frustrating Anandhi's mother-in-law, Hemamalini. Anandhi's father-in-law, Sivagurunathan IAS, District Collector of the Nilgiris, takes Karthik under his wing, tasking him with observation only. Karthik witnesses Pannaikadu villagers protesting demanding electric fencing to protect against wild animals. Recognizing the collector's inaction, Karthik advises the villagers on a self-immolation threat, prompting Sivagurunathan to expedite the installation of electric fencing.

The household tensions escalate, prompting the inmates to demand Karthik's expulsion. Anandhi intervenes, urging Karthik to apologize and stay. However, Sivagurunathan, his wife, and his son Aravind IFS humiliate Anandhi and Karthik, forcing them to leave in self-respect. Kumarasamy and Saraswathi blame Karthik for the chaos and ruining Anandhi's life. Kumarasamy seeks forgiveness from Aravind but is rebuffed. Enraged, Kumarasamy reveals a long-hidden secret: Karthik is adopted. He conditions his acceptance of Karthik on reuniting Anandhi with her in-laws. Undeterred, Karthik seeks forgiveness from Sivagurunathan's family but faces humiliation. To drive home the gravity of his actions, Sivagurunathan dismisses Keshav from his household job.

Archana, who has developed feelings for Karthik, recognizes his transformation and offers support. At a school function, Aravind is moved by his children's emotions and reconciles with Anandhi. However, Sivagurunathan remains unforgiving, prompting Aravind to move into Karthik's residence with his family. Hemamalini advises her husband to forgive, but he ridicules her, leading her to leave and join Karthik. Archana attempts to convince Sivagurunathan by proposing her marriage to Karthik, but he publicly humiliates her. Dr. Vinay, who harbors one-sided feelings for Archana and seeks to leverage Sivagurunathan's influence, proposes marriage.

However, Sivagurunathan's ambitions for a promotion to the Prime Minister's Office in Delhi are derailed. At a press conference, a video praising his actions in Pannaikadu village, narrated by Karthik, is showcased. Facing tough questions, Sivagurunathan resigns from his post, declaring the promotion unnecessary. Dr. Vinay abandons Sivagurunathan upon learning of his resignation. Karthik offers assistance, but Sivagurunathan refuses. En route home, thugs kidnap and assault him, but Karthik rescues him. Transformed, Sivagurunathan accepts Karthik as his son-in-law and consents to his marriage to Archana. He sheds his superiority complex, apologizes to Anandhi, and acknowledges Kumarasamy and Saraswathi's exemplary parenting.

At the wedding, Kumarasamy is stunned to see Keshav, revealed as the mastermind behind Sivagurunathan's kidnapping. Sivagurunathan ultimately forgives Keshav.

== Cast ==
- Ravi Mohan as Karthik Kumarasamy
- Priyanka Mohan as Archana Sivagurunathan
- Bhumika Chawla as Anandhi Aravind (née Kumarasamy)
- Natty Subramaniam as Aravind Sivagurunathan IFS
- Rao Ramesh as Sivagurunathan IAS, Aravind and Archana's father
- VTV Ganesh as Keshav, Caretaker
- Saranya Ponvannan as Hemamalini Sivagurunathan
- Seetha as Saraswathi Kumarasamy, Karthik's mother
- Achyuth Kumar as Kumarasamy, Karthik's father
- M. S. Bhaskar as Dr. Phoenix Pushparaja
- Sathish Krishnan as Dr. Vinay
- Suresh Chakravarthi as Dr. Narayanamoorthi
- Supergood Subramani as Villager
- Billy Murali as Rowdy
- Birla Bose
- Lollu Sabha Seshu as a priest
- Bayilvan Ranganathan as Rocket Ranganathan, a reporter

Uncredited

- Srilekha Parthasarathy as a Maths Teacher
- Vriddhi Vishal

== Production ==
=== Development ===
In mid December 2021, M. Rajesh narrated a script to Ravi Mohan, which the actor was interested to act in. Harris Jayaraj was reported to compose the score, and Keerthy Suresh was reported to play the lead female role, however, the makers finalised Priyanka Mohan. A muhurat puja was held on 3 August 2022, while the official launch was made on 5 August. Bhumika Chawla was announced being a part of the cast in mid August. She was reported to play Ravi's sister in the film. The title Brother was revealed on 18 September 2023.

=== Filming ===
Principal photography commenced on 5 August 2022, with the first schedule in Chennai. Chawla started filming her portions in mid August. The final schedule commenced in early September 2023. Filming was completed by February 2024.

== Music ==
Brother

Soundtrack album by Harris Jayaraj
- Released: 21 September 2024
- Genre: Film soundtrack
- Length: 21:25
- Language: Tamil
- Label: Think Music
- Producer: Harris Jayaraj

Harris Jayaraj chronology
Extra Ordinary Man (2023)	Brother (2024)	Kadhal Reset Repeat (2026)

Singles from Brother
- 1. "Amudha Amudha"; 2. "Medhakuthu Kaalu Rendum"; 3. "Makkamishi"; 4. "Akka Song"; 5. "Badugas Night"

External audio
- Brother – Jukebox on YouTube

The music and background score is composed by Harris Jayaraj, in his fourth collaboration with Ravi after Dhaam Dhoom (2008), Engeyum Kadhal (2011) and Vanamagan (2017); second with Rajesh after Oru Kal Oru Kannadi (2012). It also marks his return to composing after a two-year hiatus.

Later, the production house announced that the audio rights for the film was secured by Think Music. The first single "Makkamishi" was released on 20 June 2024.

Track listing
No.	Title	Lyrics	Singer(s)	Length
1.	"Amudha Amudha"	Parvathy Meera	Karthik, Ahana Balaji, Bhargavi Sridhar	3:49
2.	"Medhakuthu Kaalu Rendum"	Parvathy Meera	Madhushree	3:35
3.	"Makkamishi"	Paal Dabba	Paal Dabba, Dacalty	4:15
4.	"Akka Song"	Thamarai	Stephen Zechariah	5:30
5.	"Badugas Night"	Vignesh Ramakrishna	Yogi Sekar, Sunitha Sarathy	4:16
Total length:				21:25

== Release ==
=== Theatrical ===
Brother was released worldwide on 31 October 2024 in theatres, coinciding with Diwali, clashing with Amaran and Bloody Beggar.

=== Home media ===
The film began streaming on ZEE5 from 29 November 2024. The post-theatrical satellite rights of the film was bought by Zee Tamil.

== Reception ==
=== Critical response ===
Brother received mixed reviews from critics as well as audience criticising the outdated storyline.

Abhinav Subramaniam of The Times of India gave 3/5 stars and wrote "Brother is enjoyable in parts, though the soap-opera vibes detract from its appeal." Simran Khan of Times Now gave 3/5 stars and wrote "Despite its predictable elements and some-what boring moments, Brother succeeds in delivering a watchable experience.[...] Overall, it offers a delightful mix of comedy and drama that appeals to audiences of all ages."

Janani K of India Today gave 2/5 stars and wrote "Brother is yet another redundant film that offers nothing new." Avinash Ramachandran of The Indian Express gave 2/5 stars and wrote "Brother is just another disappointing addition to these attempts to reclaim past glory, and all we can do is probably send him an SMS saying its okay, Boss, we will always have OKOK." Anusha Sundar of OTT Play gave 2/5 stars and wrote "Brother is a film that is redundant and non-charming in every possible way."

Praveen Sudevan of The Hindu wrote "Had Rajesh chosen to create a straight-up family drama without the forced comedic bits, Brother might have worked better. Instead, it ends up neither funny nor serious enough to make an impact." Akshay Kumar of The New Indian Express wrote "This mishmash of genres has effectively diluted the film’s core, rendering it inconsequential."
