= Chimbu Deven =

Indian film director

Chimbu Devan
- Born: Senthil Kumar; 23 November; Madurai, Tamil Nadu, India
- Occupations: Cartoonist, Director, screenwriter
- Years active: 2006 – present
- Spouse: Kalaivani (m. 2013)

Chimbu Devan is an Indian film director, writer, cartoonist, and screenwriter known for his works in Tamil cinema. His films mostly explore the fantasy and historical genres and also comedy. He debuted with the historical comedy-drama film, Imsai Arasan 23rd Pulikecei (2006).

== Career ==
Devan started his career as an assistant director on Cheran's 2000 film Vetri Kodi Kattu. His first independent direction opportunity came from S Pictures with the 2006 film Imsai Arasan 23rd Pulikecei. When the plot was pitched to director Shankar, the latter was interested and agreed to collaborate with Devan. The film featured comedian Vadivelu in the lead role for the first time. The film went on to become a success.

Devan's second film was the 2008 fantasy comedy Arai En 305-il Kadavul, which starred comedians Santhanam and Ganja Karuppu as the leads. His third movie, 2010's western parody comedy Irumbukkottai Murattu Singam, starred Raghava Lawrence and Padmapriya. Both films released to mixed reviews.

In 2014, Devan wrote and directed Oru Kanniyum Moonu Kalavaanikalum, starring Arulnithi, which was an average success. A year later, he directed the fantasy film Puli, starring Vijay, Sudeep, Sridevi (who made a comeback to Tamil cinema), Shruti Haasan, and Hansika Motwani The film released to mixed reviews, but collected ₹150 crore in its full run.

In 2021, Devan directed the anthology film Kasada Thapara, co-produced by Venkat Prabhu. The story is split into six portions with each portion boasting of different technicians, and a collection of short stories connected by a hyperlinked narrative. In 2022, Devan directed Kottai Pakku Vathalum Mottai Maadi Sitharum, an episode of the anthology series Victim.

In 2024, Devan directed the survival drama Boat, starring Yogi Babu.

== Filmography ==
Key
†	Denotes films that have not yet been released

- All films are in Tamil unless noted otherwise

Year	Title	Notes	Ref
2006	Imsai Arasan 23am Pulikecei		
2008	Arai En 305-il Kadavul	Remake of Bruce Almighty	
2010	Irumbukkottai Murattu Singam		
2014	Oru Kanniyum Moonu Kalavaanikalum	Based on Run Lola Run	
2015	Puli		
2021	Kasada Tabara	Streaming release; writer and director	
2022	Victim	Anthology web series; segment: Kottai Paaku Vathalum Mottai Maadi Sitharum	
2024	Boat	Also Producer	
2026	Navoria		
