= Nannbenda =

2015 Indian film by Jagadish

- Theatrical release poster
- Directed by: Jagadish
- Written by: Jagadish
- Produced by: Udhayanidhi Stalin
- Starring: Udhayanidhi Stalin; Nayanthara; Santhanam; Sherin Shringar
- Cinematography: Balasubramaniem
- Edited by: Vivek Harshan
- Music by: Harris Jayaraj
- Production company: Red Giant Movies
- Distributed by: Red Giant Movies
- Release date: 2 April 2015
- Running time: 151 minutes
- Country: India
- Language: Tamil

Nannbenda (transl. You are truly my friend) is a 2015 Indian Tamil-language romantic comedy film written and directed by Jagadish. The film, produced by Udhayanidhi Stalin, stars himself, Nayanthara, Santhanam and Sherin Shringar. The music was composed by Harris Jayaraj with cinematography by Balasubramaniem and edited by Vivek Harshan. The film was released on 2 April 2015. The title of this film is derived from a dialogue uttered by Santhanam in Boss Engira Bhaskaran (2010).

== Plot ==
Sathya is an unemployed youth from Thanjavur who goes to Trichy every month to meet his old childhood friend Sivakozhundhu, who is a hotel manager, and spend his day with the latter's salary. One such time, he meets Ramya, a bank manager, and falls in love with her. He believes that if he sees a girl three times a day casually, she will be his lucky lady. Sathya meets Ramya twice and goes all over Trichy with Sivakozhundhu in search of her. He decides to stay there that night. Just before 12:00, he sees Ramya celebrating her birthday in the hostel opposite to Sivakozhundhu's room. The next day, he proposes to her in her bank.

Meanwhile, Sivakozhundhu decides to send Sathya off by all means. However, Sathya is in turn appointed as Sivakozhundhu's assistant in a 2.5 star hotel, where Sivakozhundhu worked as a manager earlier. To improve their hotel's condition, he asks for a loan from Ramya's bank. Ramya refused to give them loan instead she gives an idea to Sathya that he can call actress and celebrity Tamannaah to the hotel.The hotel is developed. One day, Sathya and Ramya are chased by thugs, who are the henchmen of a lady whom Ramya chucked out of the hostel as she had stolen other people's valuables. Sathya saves Ramya from the thugs. The next day, Ramya tells him that she had once committed a murder and has gone to prison for the offence. This frightens Sathya, but Ramya says that once in Chennai, she was chased by a dog, whose owner is her former boss. She kicks the dog and it dies, but Blue Cross members see this and take Ramya to court, where she is imprisoned for 10 days and fined Rs.5000 for killing the dog. Sathya laughs at this. Ramya is hurt and asks him to get out of the station or else she would go out of town. That night, Sathya and Sivakozhundhu decide to commit a crime and go to prison so that they could understand the pain of being in prison. They get heavily drunk and beat up "Scorpio" Shankar, a local don.

The next day, Shankar confronts them, while they were going to the bus stand to send Sathya to Thanjavur. He says that Ramya had seized his beloved Scorpio car, as he had not paid his instalments to the bank, so he had planned to assassinate Ramya that night. Shankar thinks that Sathya and Sivakozhundhu had known his plans, knowingly hit him, and sent him in a lorry. Shankar chases the two to a local park. When he comes to kill them, Sathya and Sivakozhundhu punch him, and he falls upside down. When they rotate him, they are shocked to see a knife in his heart and that he had died. The public witnesses this and complains to the police that Sathya and Sivakozhundhu had killed Shankar.

The inspector in-charge of this case is Sathya's and Sivakozhundhu's old childhood friend Thangadurai, who unfortunately does not help them. He wants to seek revenge against them as they had humiliated him when the three of them were in school. He comes to them in prison and informs them that he had found the real murderer but will not say it to the judge, until they sentence the two of them to life imprisonment or death. That night, Sathya and Sivakozhundhu escape prison so that they could murder Thangadurai for doing this to them. On their way, Sathya goes to Ramya's hostel to meet her for one last time. Ramya says that she had used the surveillance camera in the park and given it to Thangadurai, who found out that "Baby" Kumar, Shankar's enemy, had thrown the knife from a distance when he was falling down. Thangadurai thanked Ramya and had said that whatever it might be, but Sathya and Sivakozhundhu are his friends and he would release them as soon as possible. However, Thangadurai had mockingly cheated the two so that they would be restless that whole night.

Afraid of what would happen if they are not in prison that morning, Sathya and Sivakozhundhu search the outlet from where they had escaped, but they could not find it. After losing hopes, they find two other prisoners escaping from that route. Instead of going inside the tunnel that they had come from, the two chase the other two prisoners and hand them over to the police, excusing themselves, saying that they had gone through the tunnel only to catch those two prisoners. They are then successfully released from prison the next morning, and Kumar is arrested for murdering Shankar.

== Cast ==
- Udhayanidhi Stalin as Sathya
- Nayanthara as Ramya (Voice dubbed by Savitha Reddy)
- Santhanam as Sivakolundhu
- Sherin Shringar as Preethi (Voice dubbed by M. M. Manasi)
- Karunakaran as Thangadurai
- Rajendran as "Scorpio" Shankar
- Rajasimman as "Baby" Kumar
- Sayaji Shinde as Govindan, Sathya's father
- Sriranjani as Lakshmi, Sathya's mother
- Manobala as Senthamarai
- Chitra Lakshmanan as Hotel Manager
- Pattimandram Raja as Preethi's father
- Vinodhini Vaidyanathan as Ramya's colleague
- Suzane George as Ramya's hostel mate
- Pooja Ramachandran as Jenny
- Lollu Sabha Manohar as Siruvan
- Kadhal Dhandapani
- Vazhakku En Muthuraman as Inspector Kumaravel
- Supergood Subramani as Constable Subramani
- Nagalakshmi as Item
- Cool Suresh as Sivakolundhu's friend
- Tamannaah Bhatia as herself (Cameo)
- Kanakarajsamy

== Production ==
In July 2013, Udhayanidhi Stalin revealed that he would produce and appear in a venture titled Nannbenda alongside Santhanam and that the project would be directed by Jagadish, an assistant to director M. Rajesh. Kajal Aggarwal signed on as the lead actress.

The first look of the film was released in January 2014, with confirmation that the cinematography would be handled by Balasubramaniem and music composed by Harris Jayaraj, both collaborating with Udhayanidhi for his third successive venture as an actor. Later that month, it was announced that Nayanthara had replaced Aggarwal and would collaborate with Udhayanidhi for the second time after Idhu Kathirvelan Kadhal. Tamannaah Bhatia agreed to appear in a cameo role as herself and shot for an entire day for the film in Chennai in April 2014. Sherin returned to Tamil cinema with this film after nearly four years.

== Soundtrack ==
The film's soundtrack album and background score was composed by Harris Jayaraj. The music rights were purchased by Sony Music India. A video teaser of the "Nee Sunno New Moono" song was released by Udhayanidhi on his YouTube production page on 21 December 2014. The album was released on 23 December 2014.

Track listing
No.	Title	Lyrics	Singer(s)	Length
1.	"Enai Marubadi Marubadi"	Madhan Karky	Vijay Prakash, Megha	5:50
2.	"Oorellaam Unnai Kandu"	Vairamuthu	P. Unnikrishnan, Bombay Jayashri	4:56
3.	"Nee Sunno New Moono"	Pa. Vijay	Richard, Andrea Jeremiah, Mili Nair	4:43
4.	"Neeraambal Poovae"	Thamarai	Arjun Menon, MC Vickey	2:57
5.	"Dappankuthu Mettula"	Vijaya Sagar	Gana Bala, Ujjayinee Roy	4:18
6.	"Thaene Thaene Sendhaene"	Na. Muthukumar	Haricharan, Pravin Saivi	3:40
Total length:				26:24

== Critical response ==
A critic of The Times of India rated the film 3 out of 5 and wrote"... it exploits formula to the hilt and like a well-oiled machine, does what it set out to be". Gautaman Bhaskaran of Hindustan Times rated 1 out of 5 and wrote "Honestly, Nannbenda is a 151-minute of sheer boredom, liberally peppered with juvenile jokes and intolerably silly situations". Sudhir Srinivasan of The Hindu wrote, "Nanbenda: A comedy that isn’t funny". Anupama Subramanian of Deccan Chronicle rated the film 2 stars and wrote that "the film falls prey to a weak script". Sify criticised the script, saying it "is painfully predictable and you will find yourself chuckling and cringing alternately while watching the film".
