= Mr. Local =

2019 Tamil-language comedy film by M. Rajesh

- Theatrical release poster
- Directed by: M. Rajesh
- Written by: M. Rajesh
- Produced by: K. E. Gnanavel Raja
- Starring: Sivakarthikeyan; Nayanthara
- Cinematography: Dinesh B. Krishnan; Arthur A. Wilson (1 song)
- Edited by: Vivek Harshan
- Music by: Hiphop Tamizha
- Production company: Studio Green
- Distributed by: Tanvee Films; Sakthi Film Factory
- Release date: 17 May 2019
- Running time: 154 minutes
- Country: India
- Language: Tamil

Mr. Local is a 2019 Indian Tamil-language romantic comedy film written and directed by M. Rajesh. The film stars Sivakarthikeyan and Nayanthara, while Radhika Sarathkumar, Sathish, Yogi Babu, and Robo Shankar play supporting roles. The music was composed by Hiphop Tamizha.

The principal photography of Mr. Local commenced in May 2018 and wrapped in May 2019. The film was released on 17 May 2019 to mostly negative reviews, with many critics criticising the outdated plot.

== Plot ==
The film begins in a jail in Paris, where Manohar, who is from Chennai, has just been released on bail provided by the Indian Embassy. Before his release, he tells the jail warden about how he ended up in jail.

Mano is a middle-class youth who works as a salesperson in KUN Hyundai managed by Kuthala Sithambaram. One day, he gets into a minor accident involving Keerthana Vasudevan, an arrogant TV producer. Keerthana soon develops a hatred for Mano, who constantly irritates her with his antics. Keerthana's hatred for Mano is such that she buys the KUN Hyundai showroom only to fire him, and she even goes to the extent of firing Sithambaram and Mano's friend Raja because they oppose her decision to terminate Mano.

Mano soon develops romantic feelings for Keerthana, which only increases the friction between them. Later, Keerthana meets with an accident and is admitted to the hospital by Mano, who donates blood to her to save her life. Keerthana, seemingly grateful to Mano for his gesture, invites him to Paris to meet her aunt and uncle and spend a few days with them, but this turns out to be a trap hatched by Keerthana to get rid of him once and for all. Keerthana speaks ill of Mano's family, which causes him to slap her in a rage. For this reason, he is arrested.

In the present day, following his release, Mano borrows the warden's motorbike to meet Keerthana before leaving for India. He sees Keerthana being chased by goons led by her fiancé Ashwin. She had called off the engagement after finding out that Ashwin is a transgender man and a misogynist. Mano saves Keerthana from Ashwin and his goons, after which he leaves for India. At this juncture, Keerthana realizes that she too loves Mano. She returns to Chennai a few days later and accepts Mano's love.

== Cast ==
- Sivakarthikeyan as Manohar
- Nayanthara as Keerthana Vasudevan
- Radhika Sarathkumar as Easwari
- Sathish as P. Raja
- Yogi Babu as Auto Sekar
- Robo Shankar as Kuthala Sithambaram
- Narayan Lucky as Ashwin
- Thambi Ramaiah as Lakshman
- John Vijay as Arjun Reddy
- Anil Murali as Inspector Prasanna Kumar
- Eruma Saani Harija as Divya
- G. Marimuthu as Mayilvaganam
- Shalu Shamu as Asha Jasmine
- Thaadi Balaji as Serial Director
- Nakshathra Nagesh as Sowmiya
- Lizzie Antony as Keerthana's advocate
- Krithika Laddu as Kavitha
- Subhashini Kannan as Kavitha's mother

== Production ==
Filming began in May 2018, marking Sivakarthikeyan's 13th film as lead actor. Portions of the film were shot in Chennai. The film's first look poster was unveiled by actor Sivakarthikeyan himself through his Twitter account on 2 February 2019. Nayanthara was selected as the heroine, collaborating with Sivakarthikeyan for the second time after Velaikkaran. The filmmakers confirmed that the film is not a remake of the 2017 Telugu hit film Nenu Local. The film was shot extensively in Baku, Azerbaijan. Filming entered its final stage in February 2019, but ultimately wrapped that May.

== Soundtrack ==
The soundtrack was composed by Hiphop Tamizha. All the songs were released as singles.

Tracklist
No.	Title	Lyrics	Singer(s)	Length
1.	"Takkunu Takkunu"	Mirchi Vijay	Anirudh Ravichander	3:32
2.	"Kalakkalu Mr. Localu"	K. R. Dharan	Sivakarthikeyan	3:45
3.	"Menaminiki"	Rokesh	Benny Dayal, Snigdha Chandra	3:52
4.	"Mr. Local Theme"	Hiphop Tamizha, Paul B Sailus, SanGan, K.R. Dharan	Hiphop Tamizha, Paul B Sailus, SanGan, Palaniammal	2:40
5.	"Nee Nenacha"	Hiphop Tamizha	Sid Sriram	4:28
Total length:				18:07

== Release and reception ==
Mr. Local was released on 17 May 2019 and received negative reviews from critics. Aditya Shrikrishna of Silverscreen India called it Rajesh's "worst film" and criticised its lack of originality. The Times of India critic Thinkal Menon gave the film 2 out of 5 stars, saying "Sivakarthikeyan and Nayantara look good on screen, and that's the only positive factor in the film, which otherwise is full of ineffective one-liners, illogical scenes and exhausting dialogues and songs". Vishal Menon of Film Companion wrote, "A lot of effort seems to have gone in to make Mr.Local, directed by M. Rajesh, seem current and modern [...] Yet why is the film's core ideas stuck in stone-age?". Srinivasa Ramanujam of The Hindu wrote, "Sivakarthikeyan’s presence just about manages to hold Mr Local together [...] the songs are all just fillers and contribute little to carry the story forward, which was anyway wafer-thin in the first place".
