= All in All Azhagu Raja =

2013 Indian film directed by M. Rajesh

- Theatrical release poster
- Directed by: M. Rajesh
- Written by: M. Rajesh
- Produced by: K. E. Gnanavel Raja
- Starring: Karthi; Prabhu; Kajal Aggarwal; Santhanam; Radhika Apte; Saranya Ponvannan
- Cinematography: Sakthi Saravanan
- Edited by: Vivek Harshan
- Music by: S. Thaman
- Production company: Studio Green
- Distributed by: Studio Green
- Release date: 2 November 2013
- Running time: 162 minutes
- Country: India
- Language: Tamil

All in All Azhagu Raja (transl. All in All Handsome King) is a 2013 Indian Tamil-language romantic comedy film written and directed by M. Rajesh. The film stars Karthi in a dual roles with Prabhu, Kajal Aggarwal, Santhanam, Radhika Apte, and Saranya Ponvannan in the supporting roles. The music was composed by S. Thaman with cinematography by Sakthi Saravanan and editing by Vivek Harshan. The film was released on 2 November 2013, coinciding with Diwali, and received negative reviews from critics.

== Plot ==
Azhagu Raja is the only son of Muthukrishnan and Meenakshi. He owns a struggling cable channel called "Triple A" in Tenkasi. The cable company has only two employees: Raja and Kalyanam. Nothing they do improves the company's fortunes. By chance, Raja meets Chitra Devi Priya when she is singing at a wedding. Her unusual voice irritates him, and they argue. However, Priya eventually agrees that she cannot sing well. Priya says she fails at everything she tries, even suicide. As their friendship blossoms, Raja tells his father about Priya, which triggers a memory in his father about his past.

Muthukrishnan used to work for Burma Ramaswamy after being recommended by Kali. Meenakshi, Ramaswamy's daughter, falls for him. Seeing his hard work and dedication, Ramaswamy promotes him to more responsible work in the theatre and appoints Kali under him. Meenakshi asks for an answer in two days, but an enraged Kali, filled with jealousy, plots to pit Ramaswamy against Muthukrishnan and is successful when Muthukrishnan is ousted by Ramaswamy due to a misunderstanding.

Raja steps into Muthukrishnan's 1980s world. Priya's father Kandhaswamy and Muthukrishnan reject Raja's marriage proposal to Priya. However, soon both Muthukrishnan and Kandhaswamy meet and realise that jealousy of Kali, Kalyanam's father, was the reason for the problems of the families. Finally, Kalyanam tells the real story, and both families unite to marry Raja and Priya.

== Cast ==
- Karthi as Azhagu Raja
- Prabhu as Muthukrishnan
  - Karthi also appears as younger Muthukrishnan
- Kajal Aggarwal as Chitra Devi Priya (Voice: Ragini Sri Mani)
- Santhanam in a dual role as
  - Kalyanam (Kareena Chopra)
  - Kaali
- Radhika Apte as Meenakshi Preetha Ramaswamy
- Saranya Ponvannan as Meenakshi Muthukrishnan
- Nassar as Burma Raamasamy
- Kota Srinivasa Rao as Chokkanathan
- Aadukalam Naren as Kanthasamy (Kuttil Star)
- Sriranjani as Kanthasamy's wife
- M. S. Bhaskar as Dhillaana Dhivyanathan
- Santhana Bharathi as Khader Bhai
- V. S. Raghavan as Sathyamoorthy
- Subbu Panchu as Doctor
- Vetrivel Raja as Damodaran
- Kovai Senthil
- K. Bujji Babu

== Production ==
Rajesh first announced a project with Karthi called Kaagitha Kappal, but it did not proceed. Instead, they were confirmed to be collaborating on All in All Azhagu Raja, named after a character played by Goundamani in the 1984 film Vaidehi Kathirunthal. Because Tamil films with non-Tamil titles were not exempt from entertainment tax exemption, the English portions of the title were de-emphasised in later promotional material. Kajal Aggarwal, who worked with Karthi in Naan Mahaan Alla, was selected as the heroine. Narain was reported to part of the cast, but later denied this. Filming began on 2 March 2013. The film was shot in Kumbakonam, Pollachi, Gobichettipalayam, Tenkasi, Ambasamuthiram and other places of Tamil Nadu.

== Soundtrack ==
The soundtrack was composed by S. Thaman. The audio rights were secured by Sony Music. The audio was expected to release at an event on 27 September 2013, however the audio was released on 10 October 2013, at Sathyam Cinemas in Chennai. The album features five tracks, with one of the songs "Chellam" (Yaarukkum Sollama) was released on 4 October 2013. Karthik Srinivasan of Milliblog reviewed it as a short, lively and fun soundtrack.

All lyrics are written by Na. Muthukumar.

Track listing
No.	Title	Singer(s)	Length
1.	"All in All"	Suchith Suresan	5:05
2.	"Yaarukkum Sollama"	Rahul Nambiar	4:33
3.	"Unnai Partha Neram"	Vijay Yesudas, Srivardhini	3:49
4.	"Ore Oru"	Javed Ali	2:42
5.	"Yamma Yamma"	Sooraj Santhosh, Shreya Ghoshal	4:28
Total length:			20:37

== Release and reception ==
All in All Azhagu Raja was released on 2 November 2013, coinciding with Diwali, and received negative reviews from critics. Baradwaj Rangan wrote for The Hindu, "What a wretched, bloated, unfunny mess this is, with the ugliest segues between comedy and melodrama in recent memory. Scenes go on and on with no point, and as a result, the film goes on and on pointlessly." S. Saraswathi of Rediff.com gave it 1.5 stars out of 5 and wrote, "All in All Azhagu Raja is an absolutely ridiculous and tortuously long romantic comedy film that seriously tests your patience." Sify wrote, "All in All Azhaguraja falls flat on its face... it is an ordeal to sit through this profoundly irritating film...it lacks basic storyline and took the audiences for granted. The film has no real script to speak of, at best a skeletal plot", and in its final verdict termed the film as a "Big Bore".
