= Subbu Panchu =

Indian actor

- Born: Subramaniam Panchu Arunachalam; 20 November 1969 (age 57); Rayavaram, Tamil Nadu, India
- Other names: P. Ar. Subramaniam, Panju Subbu
- Occupations: Actor, producer, voice actor and choreographer
- Years active: 1988-1993; 2005-present
- Political party: Bharathiya Janatha Party (2020-)

Subramaniam Panchu Arunachalam, credited as Subbu Panchu or P. Ar. Subramaniam (born 20 November 1969), is an Indian actor and film producer. Son of noted writer-producer Panchu Arunachalam, Subbu first appeared as a child artist in the Malayalam film Daisy, before working in the production department of his father's P. A. Art Productions. He returned to acting with the television series Arasi and shot to fame following his performance in the 2010 comedy film Boss Engira Bhaskaran. Subbu has occasionally worked as a voice actor and choreographer as well.

== Career ==
Subbu, born to writer-producer Panchu Arunachalam, had been in the film industry since his childhood. He made his acting debut at age 14 as a child artist in the Malayalam film Daisy, directed by Pratap Pothen, who was then his neighbour. He was soon made by his father to work as an assistant production manager under Balagopi in his father's P. A. Art Productions for the Rajinikanth-starrer Guru Sishyan. Since Guru Sishyan, Subbu was involved in all the productions until the most recent release Maya Kannadi (2007), with Subbu being promoted from an executive producer to the main producer.

In 2002, Subbu acted in a film directed by Agathiyan, Kadhal Samrajyam, as one of its lead actors, However, after the release of the soundtrack, the film was shelved and was never released. In 2008, he ventured into television and appeared in the popular television drama series Arasi on Sun TV. He was approached by its director Samuthirakani to play the antagonist's role in the film, a role which was initially supposed to last for a week only, but was extended following positive responses. His first Tamil film was Saroja (2008), in which he had a cameo appearance. Subbu returned to the big screen with M. Rajesh's comedy film Boss Engira Bhaskaran, in which he played a pivotal character as the brother of the character played by Arya. The film became one of 2010's biggest commercial successes, which brought Subbu into the limelight and subsequently led to several more acting offers. He starred in Cloud Nine Movies' Thoonga Nagaram as a tahsildar, and appeared in films including Ajith Kumar's Mankatha where he played a CBI officer, and Aranmanai 2, both in negative roles.

Subbu had previously also worked as a choreographer in the K. Balachander-produced Vidukadhai, and as a voice actor, dubbing for actors Suman and Mukesh Tiwari in Sivaji: The Boss and Kandaswamy, respectively.

He has also appeared in advertisements for Hamam and Lakshmi ceramics. In 2012-13, he hosted a game show, Aayirathil Oruvan, on Zee Tamil channel.

== Filmography ==
=== Films ===
- All films are in Tamil, unless otherwise noted.

| Year | Title | Role | Notes |
|---|---|---|---|
| 1988 | Daisy | Thoma | Malayalam film |
| 1988 | En Jeevan Paduthu | Dr. Vijay's assistant | Uncredited role |
| 1990 | My Dear Marthandan | Rani's teaser | Uncredited role |
| 1992 | Kalikaalam | Dancer | Special appearance in the song "Kadhal Illamal" |
| 1993 | Athma | Anil | Uncredited role |
| 2008 | Saroja | Himself | Guest appearance |
| 2010 | Mundhinam Paartheney | Himself | Guest appearance |
| 2010 | Boss Engira Bhaskaran | Saravanan | |
| 2011 | Thoonga Nagaram | | |
| 2011 | Aanmai Thavarael | Mr. A | |
| 2011 | Mankatha | Kamal Ekambaram | |
| 2012 | Kalakalappu | Manickam | |
| 2012 | Maalai Pozhudhin Mayakathilaey | Coffee Shop Owner | |
| 2013 | Chennaiyil Oru Naal | Murugan | |
| 2013 | Settai | Commissioner Vijayakumar | |
| 2013 | Pattathu Yaanai | Collector | |
| 2013 | Thalaivaa | Ravi Kiran | |
| 2013 | All in All Azhagu Raja | Doctor | Cameo appearance |
| 2013 | Naveena Saraswathi Sabatham | Lord Shiva | |
| 2013 | Biriyani | Subbu Mama | |
| 2014 | Ninaithathu Yaaro | Himself | Guest appearance |
| 2014 | Vallavanukku Pullum Aayudham | Manager | |
| 2014 | Nimirndhu Nil | Lawyer Raja Senthurpandian | |
| 2015 | Janda Pai Kapiraju | Lawyer Rajasekhar | Telugu film |
| 2015 | Azhagiya Pandipuram | Deepika's brother | |
| 2015 | Massu Engira Maasilamani | Police Commissioner Shanmuga Sundaram | |
| 2016 | Aranmanai 2 | Ramesh | |
| 2016 | Anjala | UK | |
| 2016 | Natpadhigaram 79 | | |
| 2016 | Vaaliba Raja | Padhmanaban | |
| 2016 | Narathan | Principal | |
| 2016 | Guhan | | |
| 2016 | Unnodu Ka | Subash Chandrabose | |
| 2016 | Ka Ka Ka Po | Rishabarajan | |
| 2016 | Nambiar | Ramachandran's elder brother | |
| 2016 | Chennai 600028 II: Second Innings | Chidhambaram | |
| 2017 | Brindavanam | Nagaraj | |
| 2017 | Balloon | Jeeva's brother | |
| 2018 | Manushanaa Nee | | |
| 2018 | Pyaar Prema Kaadhal | Manager | |
| 2018 | Avalukkenna Azhagiya Mugam | | Also narrator |
| 2018 | Padithavudan Killithu Vidavum | Minister Duraipandi | |
| 2018 | Adanga Maru | Subash's brother | |
| 2019 | Chithiram Pesuthadi 2 | Salim's boss | |
| 2019 | Namma Veettu Pillai | Arumpon's youngest paternal uncle | |
| 2019 | RK Nagar | Inspector Nagendran | |
| 2020 | Ponmagal Vandhal | Alexander | |
| 2021 | Kasada Thapara | DCP Chathurvedha | Streaming release |
| 2021 | Annabelle Sethupathi | Sundar Raman | |
| 2021 | Maanaadu | Mugilan Arivazhagan | |
| 2021 | Blood Money | | |
| 2022 | Etharkkum Thunindhavan | Alagunambi | |
| 2022 | Enna Solla Pogirai | Anjali's Father | |
| 2022 | Prince | DRO | |
| 2023 | Ghosty | | |
| 2023 | Soppana Sundari | Car Owner | |
| 2023 | Kasethan Kadavulada | Blackmailer | |
| 2023 | Baba Black Sheep | | |
| 2024 | The Greatest of All Time | SI Rajendran | |
| 2025 | Kuzhanthaigal Munnetra Kazhagam | Chanakya | |
| 2025 | 3BHK | Murali | |
| 2025 | Premistunnaa | Murali | Telugu film |
| 2025 | Mark | Ashoka | Kannada film |
| 2026 | Lucky the Superstar | Thengai Srinivasan | |

=== Television ===
| Year | Title | Role | Channel |
|---|---|---|---|
| 2007 | Selvi | Nallathambi | Sun TV |
| 2007-2009 | Arasi | Nallathambi | Sun TV |
| 2012-2013 | Aayirathil Oruvan | Host | Zee Tamil |
| 2021 | Live Telecast | Mike | Disney+ Hotstar |

=== Dubbing artist ===
| Actor | Film(s) | Notes |
|---|---|---|
| Suman | Sivaji | |
| Suman | Rudramadevi | Tamil dubbed version |
| Suman | Irumbu Thirai | |
| Suman | Vantha Rajavathaan Varuven | |
| Suman | The Legend | |
| Mukesh Tiwari | Kanthaswamy | |
| Mukesh Tiwari | Mallanna | Telugu dubbed version |
| Jamie Foxx | The Amazing Spider-Man 2 | Tamil dubbed version |
| Jagapathi Babu | Kaththi Sandai | |
| Adil Hussain | Yatchan | |
| R. Amarendran | Jil Jung Juk | |
| K. S. Krishnan | Sardar | |
| Ravi Prakash | Custody | |
| Unknown | Sumo | Japanese don |
| Rajiv Menon | Vishwanath & Sons | |

=== Producer credits ===
| Year | Film | Producer |
|---|---|---|
| 1988 | Guru Sishyan | Co-producer |
| 1991 | Michael Madhana Kamarajan | Executive producer |
| 1992 | Rasukutty | Co-producer |
| 1992 | Thambi Pondatti | Co-producer |
| 1994 | Veera | Co-producer |
| 1999 | Poovellam Kettuppar | Co-producer |
| 2001 | Rishi | Co-producer |
| 2002 | Solla Marandha Kadhai | Co-producer |
| 2007 | Maya Kannadi | Yes |
| 2016 | Chennai 600028 II: Second Innings | Executive producer |
