= Kadavul Irukaan Kumaru =

2016 Indian film by M. Rajesh

- Theatrical release poster
- Directed by: M. Rajesh
- Written by: M. Rajesh
- Produced by: T. Siva
- Starring: G. V. Prakash Kumar; Nikki Galrani; Anandhi
- Cinematography: Sakthi Saravanan
- Edited by: Vivek Harshan
- Music by: G. V. Prakash Kumar; Bobo Shashi and Karunas (1 song)
- Production company: Amma Creations
- Distributed by: 7g Films
- Release date: 18 November 2016
- Country: India
- Language: Tamil

Kadavul Irukaan Kumaru (transl. God exists, Kumar) is a 2016 Indian Tamil-language romantic comedy film written and directed by M. Rajesh and produced by N. Ramasamy. The film stars G. V. Prakash Kumar, Nikki Galrani and Anandhi, while Prakash Raj and RJ Balaji play supporting roles. The filming began in March 2016. The film was released on 18 November 2016.

== Plot ==
Kumar is to get married in a couple of days, with his fiancé Priya. But Kumar wants to spend a day with his friends at Pondicherry celebrating his bachelor party. After a night of partying by the beach, Kumar and his friend Balaji attempt to return to Chennai the next morning, only to get caught on route by three corrupt policemen: Manimaaran, Mayilsamy, and Madaswamy. They find a huge stock of alcohol in the trunk of their car and refuse to let them go. With no money to pay the bribe, Kumar and Balaji try to escape in their car. However, they are chased down, threatened, and given an ultimatum.

== Cast ==
- G. V. Prakash Kumar as Kumar
- Nikki Galrani as Priya
- Anandhi as Nancy
- Prakash Raj as ACP Manimaaran
- RJ Balaji as Balaji, Kumar friend
- Rajendran as Father Francis Rajendran
- Robo Shankar as Inspector Mayilswamy
- Singampuli as Constable Madaswamy
- Kovai Sarala as Shanti
- Urvashi as Gomathi Gopalakrishnan, Pesuvadhellam Unmai show host
- T. Siva as Kumar's father
- Uday Mahesh as Priya's father
- Sachu as Kumar's grandmother
- Shanmugasundaram as Kumar's grandfather
- Aishwarya as Manimaaran's wife
- Manobala as "Pesuvadhellam Unmai" show director
- M. S. Bhaskar as Michael Aasirvadham, Nancy's father
- Santhana Bharathi as Church Priest
- Arjunan as Dinesh
- Jiiva as Inspector Karthi Kumar (cameo appearance)
- Mandy Takhar in a special appearance
- Gana Bala in a special appearance

== Production ==
Director M. Rajesh and actor-composer G. V. Prakash Kumar announced that they would collaborate for a new comedy film during early November 2015, after the director had been impressed with the actor's performance in Trisha Illana Nayanthara (2015). The film was titled Kadavul Irukaan Kumaru after a dialogue from Selvaraghavan's Pudhupettai (2006).

Production began for the film at Sathyam Cinemas in early March 2016, before the team shifted to film scenes in Pondicherry. Prakash Kumar and RJ Balaji suffered injuries following a car accident during the making of the film in late March 2016. In May 2016, Anandhi replaced Avika Gor as one of the lead actresses.

== Soundtrack ==
The music is composed by G. V. Prakash Kumar, with lyrics for four songs written by Na. Muthukumar. One song "Locality Boys", composed by Bobo Shashi and Karunas and written by Dharran and Karunas, was released earlier than the soundtrack as a single.

Kadavul Irukaan Kumaru

Soundtrack album by G. V. Prakash Kumar
- Released: October 14, 2016
- Genre: 20:47
- Length: Feature film soundtrack
- Label: Saregama

G. V. Prakash Kumar chronology
Half Ticket (2016)	Kadavul Irukaan Kumaru (2016)	Mupparimanam (2017)

Track listing
No.	Title	Lyrics	Music	Singer(s)	Length
1.	"Gum Zaare"	Na. Muthukumar	G. V. Prakash Kumar	G. V. Prakash Kumar, Al Rufin, Maalavika Sundar	3:43
2.	"Hey Pathu Podi"	Na. Muthukumar	G. V. Prakash Kumar	G. V. Prakash Kumar	4:40
3.	"Iravinil Aattam"	Na. Muthukumar	G. V. Prakash Kumar	Gana Bala, Kovai Sarala	4:27
4.	"Locality Boys"	Dharran and Karunas	Karunas and Bobo Shashi	G. V. Prakash Kumar, Grace Karunas, Ken Karunas	3:33
5.	"Nee Pona Theruvula"	Na. Muthukumar	G. V. Prakash Kumar	G. V. Prakash Kumar, MC Vickey, Vishnupriya Ravi	4:24
Total length:					20:47

== Reception ==
The critic from The Hindu wrote it is "amusing to see how little [Rajesh's] cinema has evolved", while S. Saraswathi of Rediff.com stated that "Kadavul Irukaan Kumaru is a waste of time" and that the film "was plain annoying". Manoj Kumar R from The Indian Express suggested "if you decide to sit this one out, don’t worry you are not missing out on a lot". In contrast, a reviewer from Sify noted "Kadavul Irukaan Kumaru is a watchable comedy entertainer and it might entertain if you don't worry much about logical loopholes and some blatant comedy sequences".
