= Victim (TV series) =

2022 Indian Tamil-language anthology thriller show

- Poster
- Genre: Thriller
- Written by: Chimbudevan; M Rajesh; Pa. Ranjith; Venkat Prabhu
- Directed by: Chimbudevan; M Rajesh; Pa. Ranjith; Venkat Prabhu
- Starring: Nassar; Thambi Ramaiah; Natty Subramaniam; Priya Bavani Shankar; Kalaiarasan; Guru Somasundaram; Prasanna; Amala Paul
- Composers: Sam C S Premgi; Ganesh Sekar; Tenma
- Country of origin: India
- Original language: Tamil

Production
- Producers: G. Dillibabu; Venkat Prabhu
- Production location: India
- Cinematography: Saravanan Ramasamy; Sakthi Saravanan; Thamizh A. Azhagan
- Editors: Lawrence Kishore; Akash Thomas; Selva R. K. Venkat Raajen
- Production companies: Axess Film Factory; Black Ticket Company

Original release
- Network: SonyLIV
- Release: 5 August 2022

Victim – Who is next? is a 2022 Indian Tamil-language anthology thriller streaming series consisting of four short films directed by Chimbu Devan, M. Rajesh, Pa.Ranjith, and Venkat Prabhu. It is jointly produced by Venkat Prabhu and G. Dillibabu, under Black Ticket Company and Axess Film Factory. The film stars Nassar, Thambi Ramaiah, Priya Bavani Shankar, Kalaiarasan, Guru Somasundaram, Prasanna and Amala Paul. The music was composed by Sam C S, Premgi, Ganesh Sekar, and Tenma. The cinematography was handled by Saravanan Ramasamy, Sakthi Saravanan, and Thamizh A. Azhagan. The editing was done by Lawrence Kishore, Akash Thomas, Selva R. K., and Venkat Raajen. The series consists of four stories. It premiered on 5 August 2022, exclusively, on SonyLIV.

== Episodes ==
Episode	Segment Title	Director	Writer	Cinematography	Music
1	Dhammam	Pa.Ranjith	Pa.Ranjith	Thamizh A Azhagan	Tenma
2	Mirrage	M. Rajesh	M. Rajesh	Sakthi Saravanan	Ganesan Sekar
3	Kottai Pakku Vathalum Mottai Maadi Sitharum	Chimbudevan	Chimbudevan	Saravanan Ramasamy	Sam CS
4	Confession	Venkat Prabhu	Manivannan Balasubramaniam	Sakthi Saravanan	Premgi Amaren

== Cast ==
Dhammam	Mirrage	Kottai Pakku Vathalum Mottai Maadi Sitharum	Confession
Guru Somasundaram as Guna; Kalaiyarasan as Sekar; Hari Krishnan as Sekar's relative; Lizzie Antony as Komatha; S R Senthil Rajan; Poorvadharini as Kema; Arjun Prabhakaran	Natty Subramaniam as Madasamy; Priya Bhavani Shankar as Pavithra; Kishore as Arun	Nassar as Mottai Maadi Siddhar; Thambi Ramaiah as Kandan, Sikkandar; RJ Vigneshkanth as Jagan	Amala Paul as Anjana; Prasanna; Krish; Anjena Kirti as air hostess Anjena; Sarvaa; Aishwarya M; Sakthi Saravanan; Suwetha G; Sujatha Babu

== Production ==
On 18 July 2022 Production House announces the trailer release date. 19 July 2022 SonyLiv release the trailer.

== Reception ==
Manoj Kumar R of The Indian Express wrote that "Pa.Ranjith's Dhammam is the pick of the lot". Srivatsan S. of The Hindu said that "Pa Ranjith excels with ‘Dhammam’, the rest peters out".
