= Kasada Tabara =

- Poster
- Directed by: Chimbu Deven
- Written by: Chimbu Deven
- Story by: Chimbu Deven
- Produced by: Venkat Prabhu; R. Ravindran
- Starring: Sundeep Kishan; Harish Kalyan; Shanthanu Bhagyaraj; Priya Bhavani Shankar; Sija Rose; Regina Cassandra; Premgi Amaren; Venkat Prabhu; Vijayalakshmi
- Cinematography: Vijay Milton; M. S. Prabhu; Balasubramaniem; S. R. Kathir; R. D. Rajasekhar; Sakthi Saravanan
- Edited by: Anthony; Praveen K. L.; Vivek Harshan; Mu. Kasi Viswanathan; Raja Mohammad; Ruben
- Music by: Yuvan Shankar Raja; Premji Amaren; Sam C. S.; Sean Roldan; Santhosh Narayanan; Ghibran
- Production companies: Black Ticket Company; Trident Arts
- Distributed by: SonyLIV
- Release date: 27 August 2021
- Running time: 138 minutes
- Country: India
- Language: Tamil

Kasada Tabara (transl. Slump) is a 2021 Tamil-language drama hyperlink film produced jointly by Venkat Prabhu's Black Ticket Company and R. Ravindran of Trident Arts, directed by Chimbu Deven with an ensemble cast and technicians. The film premiered on 27 August 2021 on SonyLIV. The name of the film has 6 letters just like the 6 anthologies that are part of this film. The film credits the editors and cinematographers as director of editing and director of photography.

== Plot ==
The lives of a few individuals get impacted, both in good and bad ways, by the actions of others who are hardly connected to them.

== Anthologies ==
Title	Cinematographer	Music	Editor
Kavasam	M. S. Prabhu	Yuvan Shankar Raja	Vivek Harshan
Sadhiyaadal	S. R. Kathir	Sean Roldan	Raja Mohammad
Thappattam	R. D. Rajasekhar	Sam C. S.	Ruben
Pandhayam	Sakthi Saravanan	Premji Amaran	Praveen K. L.
Arampatra	Balasubramaniem	Ghibran	Mu. Kasi Viswanathan
Akkarai	Vijay Milton	Santhosh Narayanan	Anthony

== Cast ==
Kavasam	Sadhiyaadal	Thappattam
Premgi Amaren as Bala; Regina Cassandra as Tripura Sundari "Trisha"; R. Aravindraj as Trisha's father; Yugi Sethu as Krishna	Shanthanu Bhagyaraj as Isaac; Chandini Tamilarasan as Isaac's girlfriend; Sampath Raj as Ayyodhi Vedha; Uma as Ayyodhi's Wife; Sendrayan as Vedha & Issac's Henchman	Sundeep Kishan as RNA. Kandha; Priya Bhavani Shankar as Kanmani; Vidya Pradeep as Vaanathi; Subbu Panchu as DCP Chathurvedhi; Rajkamal as Vaanathi's husband; Rama as Kanmani's mother; Shreekumar
Pandhayam	Arampatra	Akkarai
Harish Kalyan as Kish a.k.a. Krishnamoorthy; Arvind Akash as Kinda Sahib; Uday Mahesh as Kinda Sahib's father	Vijayalakshmi as Sundari; Prithvi Rajan; Pasanga Sivakumar as Dr. Abubacker; Sangili Murugan as Doctor	Venkat Prabhu as Samyuthan; Sija Rose as Amudhini; Rethika Srinivas as Gopuram Chitra; Jayaprakash as Judge; T. Siva

== Production ==
Chimbu Deven's next venture was officially revealed by actor Suriya through the latter's official Twitter handle, which was titled as Kasada Thapara which also carried the film's tagline, Tales of South Madras. The film will be produced jointly by Venkat Prabhu's Black Ticket Company and R.Ravindran of Trident Arts. Chimbu said that movie was not an anthology, but rather a single story encapsulating six portions with the technical team composed of six directors of photography, six editors and six music directors.

Throughout the week after the film title was revealed, several film personalities revealed all the technical teams that will be working on the film through their Twitter handles. A. Sreekar Prasad who earlier works as film editor for Chimbu's Puli film, reveals the team of six editors that will be working on the film: Anthony, Praveen KL, Vivek Harshan, Mu Kasi Viswanathan, Raja Mohammed and Ruben. It was noted that Raja Mohammad earlier had collaborated in two of the director's earlier films before. The next day after the team of film editors have been revealed, cinematographer P. C. Sreeram reveals the team of six cinematographers that will be working on the film: Vijay Milton, M. S. Prabhu, Balasubramaniem, S. R. Kathir, R. D. Rajasekhar, and Sakthi Saravanan. It was noted that S. R. Kathir earlier had collaborated as the cinematographer in director's Oru Kanniyum Moonu Kalavaanikalum film. Later, music director Gangai Amaren reveals the six music directors that will be working on the film, all of them working with the director for the first time: Yuvan Shankar Raja, Santhosh Narayanan, Sam CS, Sean Roldan, Premgi, and Ghibran.

A day after all the cinematographers, editors and music directors was announced, director A.R.Murugadoss had revealed the first look poster alongside the motion poster through his Twitter account. The poster revealed Shantanu Bhagyaraj, Sundeep Kishan, Harish Kalyan, Priya Bhavani Shankar, Venkat Prabhu, Premgi Amaren, Vijayalakshmi and Regina Cassandra acting on the film.

== Music ==
The soundtrack album features six songs and a composer for each song.

Kasada Thapara

Soundtrack album by Yuvan Shankar Raja, Sam C. S., Ghibran, Santhosh Narayanan, Sean Roldan, and Premji Amaren
- Released: 2021
- Genre: Soundtrack
- Length: 20:11
- Language: Tamil
- Label: Muzik 247

Yuvan Shankar Raja chronology
Nenjam Marappathillai (2021)	Kasada Thapara (2021)	Dikkiloona (2021)

Sam C. S. chronology
Mosagallu (2021)	Kasada Thapara (2021)	Enemy (2021)

Ghibran chronology
Maara (2021)	Kasada Thapara (2020)	Jango (2021)

Santhosh Narayanan chronology
Navarasa (2021)	Kasada Thapara (2020)	Mahaan (2022)

Sean Roldan chronology
Dharala Prabhu (2020)	Kasada Thapara (2020)	Jai Bhim (2021)

Premgi Amaren chronology
RK Nagar (2019)	Kasada Thapara (2020)	Manmadha Leelai (2022)

Track listing
No.	Title	Lyrics	Music	Singer(s)	Length
1.	"Nee Podhum Kanna"	Gangai Amaran	Sean Roldan	Sean Roldan	4:01
2.	"Enakkenna Aachu"	Snehan	Yuvan Shankar Raja	Yuvan Shankar Raja	3:39
3.	"Vaazhvomae"	Muthamil	Santhosh Narayanan	Santhosh Narayanan	2:44
4.	"Vaa Un Neram Vandhadhae"	Gangai Amaran	Premgi Amaren	Premgi Amaren, Sakthi Amaran	2:46
5.	"Irai Thandha"	Gangai Amaran	Ghibran	Deepthi Suresh	3:22
6.	"Vidhi Ezhudhiya Paattu"	Gangai Amaran	Sam C. S.	Sivam	3:39
Total length:					20:11

== Release and reception ==
This film was directly released on 27 August 2021, on Sony Liv.

Times of India wrote "The tones of the individual stories don't always gel well, and this leads to uneven storytelling, unlike in a similarly structured hyperlink movie like Super Deluxe, in which every individual story gloriously came together in enthralling fashion. But to his credit, the director manages to make us care for a few of the characters that we stay invested in the proceedings even when they feel generic." Firstpost wrote "Kasada Thabara works not because of its high-concept foundation but despite it. If you can mentally eliminate the commentary track, the film itself is quite enjoyable".
