= ITFA Best Cinematographer Award =

The ITFA Best Cinematographer Award is given by the state government as part of its annual International Tamil Film Awards for Tamil (Kollywood) films.

== The list ==
Here is a list of the award winners and the films for which they won.

Year	Cinematographer	Film
2011	Sakthi Saravanan	Mankatha
2008	Ravi Varman	Dasavathaaram
2007		
2006		
2005		
2004		
2003	Ravi K. Chandran	Kannathil Muthamittal

== See also ==
- Tamil cinema
- Cinema of India
