= Vijay Award for Best Comedian =

Indian film award category

The Vijay Award for Best Comedian is given by the Star Vijay TV channel as part of its annual Vijay Awards ceremony for Tamil films.

== The list ==
Here is a list of the award winners and the films for which they won.

Year	Actor	Film	Link
2017	Soori	Sangili Bungili Kadhava Thorae	
2014	Thambi Ramaiah	Kathai Thiraikathai Vasanam Iyakkam	
2013	Santhanam	Theeya Velai Seiyyanum Kumaru	
2012	Santhanam	Oru Kal Oru Kannadi	
2011	Santhanam; Kovai Sarala	Siruthai; Muni 2: Kanchana	
2010	Santhanam	Boss Engira Bhaskaran	
2009	Santhanam	Siva Manasula Sakthi	
2008	Kamal Haasan	Dasavathaaram	
2007	Vadivelu	Pokkiri	
2006	Vivek	Aathi	

== Nominations ==
- 2008 Kamal Haasan - Dasavathaaram
  - M. S. Bhaskar - Velli Thirai
  - Premji Amaren - Saroja
  - Vivek - Kuruvi
- 2009 Santhanam - Siva Manasula Sakthi
  - Ganja Karuppu - Naadodigal
  - Jegan - Ayan
  - Namo Narayana - Naadodigal
  - Vadivelu - Aadhavan
- 2010 Santhanam - Boss Engira Bhaskaran
  - Ganja Karuppu - Kalavani
  - M. S. Bhaskar & Chams - Irumbukkottai Murattu Singam
  - Vadivelu - Nagaram
  - Vivek - Singam
- 2011 Santhanam - Siruthai and Kovai Sarala - Muni 2: Kanchana
  - Santhanam - Deiva Thirumagal
  - Vadivelu - Kaavalan
  - Vivek - Mappillai
- 2012 Santhanam - Oru Kal Oru Kannadi
  - Karunas - Kazhugu
  - Sathyan - Nanban
  - Soori - Sundarapandian
  - VTV Ganesh - Poda Podi
- 2013 Santhanam - Theeya Velai Seiyyanum Kumaru
  - Powerstar Srinivasan - Kanna Laddu Thinna Aasaiya
  - Sathish - Ethir Neechal
  - Soori - Varuthapadatha Valibar Sangam
  - Vivek - Singam II
- 2014 Thambi Ramaiah - Kathai Thiraikathai Vasanam Iyakkam
  - Karunakaran - Yaamirukka Bayamey
  - Ramadoss - Mundasupatti
  - Santhanam - Aranmanai
  - Vivek - Velaiyilla Pattathari

== See also ==
- Tamil cinema
- Cinema of India
