= Review Raja =

Canadian film critic

- Born: Davis Courneyea; Tweed, Ontario, Canada
- Education: Ryerson University

YouTube information
- Channels: Review Raja; Reel Review Raja
- Years active: 2012–2013; 2016
- Genre: Film critique
- Subscribers: 636 thousand
- Views: 102 million
- Last updated: May 28, 2020

Davis Courneyea, better known by his alias Review Raja, is a Canadian film critic, who reviews Indian films from the Tamil film industry. He became popular through his YouTube channel "ReviewRaja", where his team regularly posts film reviews in the English language combined with satirical film sequences of the Tamil film in question. His production team consists of college friends and colleagues. Among them are two Tamils, Rajeev Kugan and Arjun Mano, who introduced him to Tamil cinema. As the popularity of Review Raja grew, he got offers from the Tamil film and television industry. However, Review Raja targets mainly non-Tamil audiences as his often repeated motive is "bringing Tamil cinema to the world."

== Biography ==
=== Personal life ===
Review Raja's real name is Davis Courneyea. He was born in the small town of Tweed, Ontario, in Canada and grew up in Belleville. He graduated 2011 in retail management at Ryerson University. He lives in Toronto working as an IT consultant. Both parents live in Ontario and he has an older sister. His father is an entrepreneur, who has been frequently traveling to India since 1991.

=== Film critiquing ===
Review Raja
- Available in: English, Tamil
- Creators: Review Raja (Davis Courneyea), Rajeev Kugan, Arjun Mano, Wes MacDonald, Udaya Bharathi
- Website: www.moviereviewraja.com
- Launched: July 19, 2012; 14 years ago
- Current status: Offline

Review Raja became a good friend of Rajeev Kugan, who worked in the same downtown IT company. In the summer of 2012 he met with Kugan and Kugan's high school friend Arjun Mano, a film student at Centennial College, and decided to watch Billa (2007), starring Ajith Kumar. Being unfamiliar with Tamil, or Indian, films before, Review Raja was impressed by the action sequences of the film, stating "It was like nothing I had seen before. I found the action sequences really amazing. Ajith punches someone and they go flying across the room!" Later, Kugan and Mano brought him to Woodside Cinemas in Toronto, where for the first time he experienced watching Tamil film among Tamil film goers, "I was shocked, People were hugging each other, running up and down the aisles, throwing popcorn and candy in the air. Just because Ajith had walked (into the shot)." As there was a dearth of English language reviewers of Tamil films on YouTube, Kugan had the idea to promote Review Raja as an English reviewer of Tamil films.

In September 2012, Review Raja opened the Tamil Short Film Contest with a 30 minutes limit for each film with English subtitles, and received 60 submissions by November 4. Later, Team Review Raja decided to make a special video dedicated to the then worldwide Korean song phenomenon Gangnam Style. Kugan mixed it with the A. R. Rahman-composed song "Style" from the soundtrack of Sivaji (2007) under his musical pseudonym dJ.icykle using Sony ACID Pro along with Adobe Audition. The video became a hit by crossing 400.000 views within a few months and is currently the most viewed video by Review Raja. In Thuppakki Music Video HD Review Rani was introduced, who made her film critic debut in Podaa Podi Movie Review HD as Review Raja thought the film was a "chick-flick and I wanted to see how a girl would gauge Silambarasan as an actor."

== Media coverage ==
After a couple of weeks of their existence, Review Raja won the Ottawa Rickshaw's online voting contest to feature a free advertisement on their rickshaws to spread Tamil cinema awareness. The Canadian Broadcasting Corporation (CBC) featured him in the news show The National and in Ontario Morning of CBC Radio One, where Review Raja announced that he would be a jury member of the 7th Vijay Awards, presented by the News Corporation-owned Indian Tamil television channel STAR Vijay.
