= M. Rajesh =

Indian film director and screenwriter (born 1975)

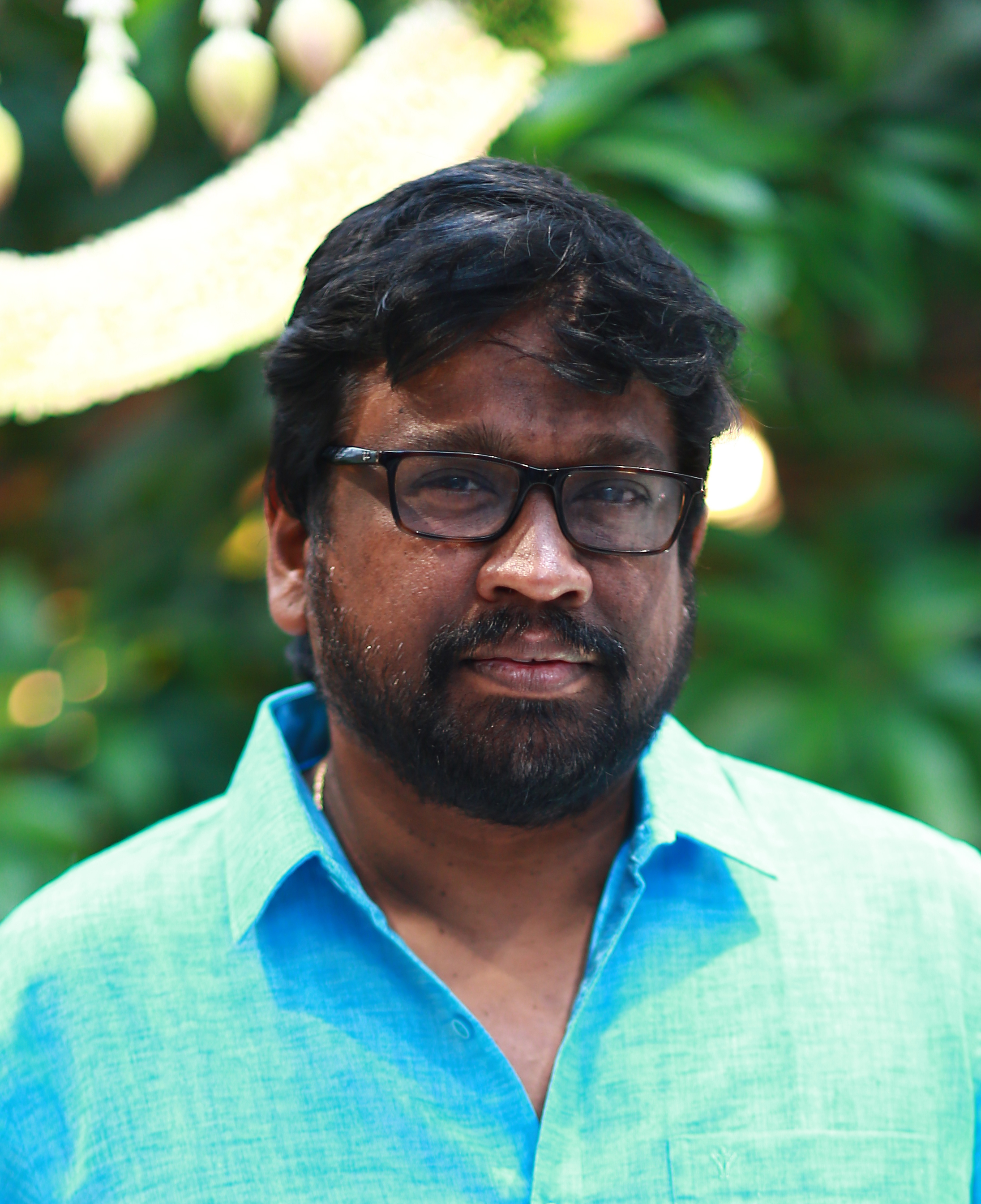
- Born: Nagercoil, Tamil Nadu, India
- Education: National Engineering College, Kovilpatti
- Occupations: Film director, screenwriter
- Years active: 2009–present
- Spouse: Shakthi

M. Rajesh is an Indian film director and screenwriter, working primarily in the Tamil film industry. Known for making romantic comedy films, he made his directorial debut with Siva Manasula Sakthi in 2009 and followed it up with Boss Engira Bhaskaran (2010) and Oru Kal Oru Kannadi (2012); all three films emerged very successful at the box office. This was followed by a career setback, as his subsequent films were poorly received and became box office failures.

== Early life ==
Rajesh was born in Nagercoil. After studying engineering at National Engineering College in Kovilpatti, he worked as an IT professional in Mumbai for six months before deciding to pursue a career in film.

== Career ==
Rajesh worked with the production unit Cosmic Blues, and as an assistant on many short films and advertisement films for 1.5 years before shifting to Chennai. He began his feature film career as an assistant director under Ameer Sultan in Mounam Pesiyadhe (2002) and later assisted S. A. Chandrasekhar on a few films including Sukran (2005) and Nenjirukkum Varai (2006). After deciding to turn director, Rajesh opted against imitating Ameer or Chandrasekhar's directing styles but wanted his own style that would appeal to youngsters, and wrote the script of Siva Manasula Sakthi (2009). The film became a commercial success, as did his next two directorial ventures, Boss Engira Bhaskaran (2010) and Oru Kal Oru Kannadi (2012). All three films were described by Sify as having reinvented "the trend of light-hearted comedy entertainers without big storylines". Rajesh later wrote the dialogues for Varuthapadatha Valibar Sangam (2013), also a success.

However, his subsequent directorial ventures All in All Azhagu Raja (2013), Vasuvum Saravananum Onna Padichavanga (2015), Kadavul Irukaan Kumaru (2016), and Mr. Local (2019) became box-office failures. By the time of Vasuvum Saravananum Onna Padichavanga's release, he was described by Sify as having lost his "Midas touch", and the website said he "should work on something out of the box to taste the much needed success". His next venture, Vanakkam Da Mappilei, premiered on Sun NXT in 2021. In 2022, Rajesh directed "Mirrage", an episode of the anthology thriller series Victim, deviating from his usual comedy films. He later directed all episodes of the 2023 series MY3. He returned to film with Brother, released in 2024. His forthcoming directorial is Jolliya Iruntha Oruthan.

== Criticism ==
Rajesh's films have been heavily criticised for seemingly glorifying stalking, drinking and degrading women. Ashutosh Mohan wrote for Film Companion that Rajesh's initial films appeared harmless: "Why shouldn't wastrels get the good girls? It stopped being funny from All in All Azhaguraja, when it became clear that misogyny, more than comedy, was really Rajesh's thing". Mohan felt the lead characters in Rajesh's films are "paragons of unproductivity" and excel in stalking, "which somehow seems to help them get girls who are otherwise sensible and independent" and lamented that these characterestics may have influenced the lead characters in films not directed by Rajesh, such as Varuthapadatha Valibar Sangam (2013), Idhu Kathirvelan Kadhal (2014) and Nannbenda (2015). Though Rajesh initially said Mr. Local would not feature any drinking or smoking scene, the film received criticism because of its toxic treatment of the female lead character, body shaming, shaming of transgender people and glorifying other activities not considered socially proper.

== Personal life ==
Rajesh is married to Shakthi, whom he met while working as an assistant under Chandrashekhar.

== Filmography ==
=== As a film director and writer ===
Year	Film
2009	Siva Manasula Sakthi
2010	Boss Engira Bhaskaran
2012	Oru Kal Oru Kannadi
2013	All in All Azhagu Raja
2015	Vasuvum Saravananum Onna Padichavanga
2016	Kadavul Irukaan Kumaru
2019	Mr. Local
2021	Vanakkam Da Mappilei
2024	Brother
2026	Jolliya Iruntha Oruthan †

=== As a dialogue writer ===
Year	Film
2013	Varuthapadatha Valibar Sangam

=== Television ===
Year	Title	Network	Notes
2022	Victim	SonyLIV	Anthology series; episode: "Mirrage" as director
2023	MY3	JioHotstar	As director

=== Frequent collaborators ===
Collaborator	Siva Manasula Sakthi; (2009)	Boss Engira Bhaskaran; (2010)	Oru Kal Oru Kannadi; (2012)	All in All Azhagu Raja; (2013)	Vasuvum Saravananum Onna Padichavanga; (2015)	Kadavul Irukaan Kumaru; (2016)	Mr. Local; (2019)	Vanakkam Da Mappilei; (2021)	Brother; (2024)	Jolliya Iruntha Oruthan; (2026)
Santhanam	Yes	Yes	Yes	Yes	Yes					
Arya	Yes (cameo)	Yes	Yes (cameo)		Yes					
Jiiva	Yes	Yes (cameo)				Yes (cameo)				
M. S. Bhaskar				Yes		Yes		Yes	Yes	
Mahanadi Shankar	Yes		Yes		Yes					
Vivek Harshan	Yes	Yes		Yes		Yes				
Sakthi Saravanan	Yes	Yes	Yes	Yes		Yes	Yes			
Yuvan Shankar Raja	Yes	Yes								Yes
