= Sakthi Saravanan =

Indian cinematographer (born 1969)

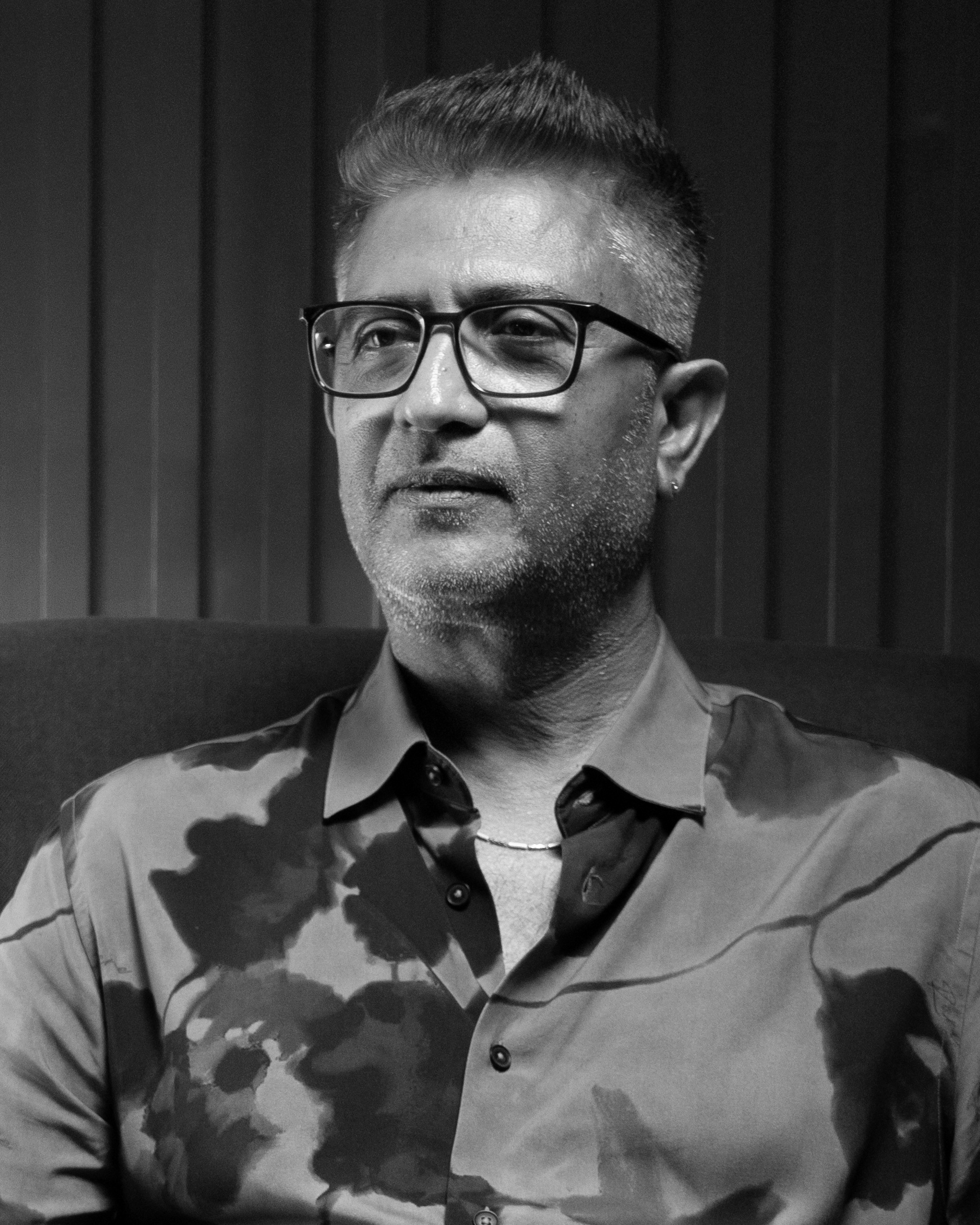
- Sakthi Saravanan
- Born: 20 November 1969 (age 56); Madurai, Tamil Nadu, India
- Occupation: Cinematographer
- Spouse(s): Hemalatha (m.1992-present)
- Children: 2

Sakthi Saravanan is an Indian cinematographer who works in Tamil and Telugu cinema. He is best known for his handheld and gritty work with Venkat Prabhu and M. Rajesh directorials. He has been the cinematographer for many critically-acclaimed films such as Chennai 600028, Saroja, Siva Manasula Sakthi, Goa, and Boss Engira Bhaskaran. He also served as cinematographer for Venkat Prabhu's Mankatha.

== Filmography ==
=== As cinematographer ===
Year	Movie	Notes
2007	Chennai 600028	
2008	Saroja	
2009	Siva Manasula Sakthi	
2010	Goa	
2010	Boss Engira Bhaskaran	
2011	Mankatha	
2013	All in All Azhagu Raja	
2013	Biriyani	
2015	Jil	Telugu film
2016	Kadavul Irukaan Kumaru	
2019	Devarattam	
2021	Kasada Tabara	Streaming release; Segment: Pandhayam
2022	Varalaru Mukkiyam	
2025	Thanal	

=== Television ===
Year	Serial	Network	Notes
1999	Chithi	Sun TV	

series)|Chithi]] || Sun TV | |- |}series)|Megala]] || Sun TV | |- |} series)|vamsam]] || Sun TV | |- |}

=== As actor ===
- Thatrom Thookrom (2020)

== Awards ==
International Tamil Film Awards (ITFA)

- Best Cinematographer - Mankatha
