= Siva Manasula Sakthi =

2009 film by M. Rajesh

- Theatrical release poster
- Directed by: M. Rajesh
- Written by: M. Rajesh
- Produced by: S. S. Balan; B. Srinivasan
- Starring: Jiiva; Anuya
- Cinematography: Sakthi Saravanan
- Edited by: S.P. Ahmed
- Music by: Yuvan Shankar Raja
- Production company: Vikatan Televistas
- Release date: 13 February 2009
- Running time: 149 minutes
- Country: India
- Language: Tamil

Siva Manasula Sakthi (transl. Sakthi in Siva's heart) also known by the initialism SMS, is a 2009 Indian Tamil-language romantic comedy film written and directed by debutant M. Rajesh. It stars Jiiva and newcomer Anuya in the lead roles, with Urvashi, Sneha Murali, Santhanam and Sathyan appearing in supporting roles. It revolves around the title characters who fall in love but soon face escalating tensions due to each other's lies.

Siva Manasula Sakthi was released on 13 February 2009. Despite initially gaining mixed reviews, it became highly successful at the box office and has since achieved cult status. The film's soundtrack by Yuvan Shankar Raja was extremely popular. The film was later remade in Telugu as Siva Manasulo Sruthi (2012).

== Plot ==
Siva and Sakthi meet on a train from Coimbatore and strike up a friendship. Siva introduces himself as an army officer and Sakthi as an air hostess. The two part ways on arrival in Chennai, but Siva promises to meet her soon. He visits the airline company where Sakthi claimed to work, with his mother Kalyani and best friend Vivek tagging along. When asking for Sakthi, they are instead greeted by another woman with the same name. Siva realises that he has been tricked.

In reality, Siva is a courier deliveryman and Sakthi is a radio jockey. When they learn of each other's deception, they swear to get revenge. A series of humorous incidents happen, with Siva teasing Sakthi live on her radio show and getting her in trouble with her father, and Sakthi retaliating by tattling on Siva to his family and using him as a driver. When Siva defeats a handful of goons in a tough fight to save Sakthi's brother Shanmugam and helps organise his marriage, Sakthi develops genuine feelings for him.

Sakthi reveals her feelings by planning a surprise birthday party for Siva, but learns that he had lied about his birth date. Humiliated in front of his family, she bitterly leaves. Siva learns of her true feelings for him and attempts to reconcile with her, but she ignores him. Siva grows upset as well, fights with his mother and sister, and continuously destroys Vivek's new mobile phones, but everyone eventually forgives him. At one point, when he visits her office, he is drunk and misbehaves with the people around. He tells Sakthi's assistant to call Sakthi, but Sakthi, enraged by Siva's behaviour, sends a man to beat him up and throw him out. Siva renounces Sakthi.

Sometime later, Sakthi's father arranges for her to meet Arun, a prospective groom. Siva coincidentally runs into Arun and is introduced as Sakthi's "close friend". He proceeds to tell Arun about all her good qualities, never mentioning anything negative. Sakthi, realising his true love, leaves Arun and asks Siva to marry her. He is still angry because she sent a man to beat him up, and because he believed she accepted Arun. She apologises, and Siva forgives her, but he asks her to go to a nearby temple where they can marry the next day. She visits the temple early the next day, but Siva does not visit, calling her and saying he refuses to marry her. Disappointed, Sakthi returns home but sees that Siva organised a surprise birthday party for her. The two of them have sex that night. The following morning, he plays another prank on her; she realises that he will never take any relationship seriously and leaves him.

Some months later, Siva arrives at Sakthi's house with his family to formally ask for her hand in marriage. During this time, Sakthi faints and is revealed to be pregnant (by Siva). When both their families learn this, they humorously surround Siva and beat him up. During the credits, set two years later, Siva and Sakthi are shown to be married and have a son, to whom Siva brags about how he successfully got Sakthi.

== Cast ==
- Jiiva as Siva
- Anuya as Sakthi
- Urvashi as Kalyani
- Shakeela as the air hostess Sakthi
- Sneha Murali as Viji
- Santhanam as Vivek
- Sathyan as Shanmugam
- G. Gnanasambandan as Sakthi's father
- Mahanadi Shankar as the police inspector
- Anandsami as Sakthi's friend
- Arya as Arun (guest appearance)
- Sivakarthikeyan (voice imitation of Rajinikanth in a small segment of the song "Oru Adangapidari"; uncredited)

== Production ==
Siva Manasula Sakthi is the directorial debut of Rajesh, a former assistant of director S. A. Chandrasekhar and Ameer. He opted against imitating Ameer or Chandrasekhar's directing styles, but wanted his own style that would appeal to youngsters, and wrote the script of this film. Anuya made her Tamil debut with this film. As she could not speak Tamil, Rajesh struggled to improvise her dialogues. A lengthy scene involving Jiiva, Anuya, Santhanam and Sathyan was shot at Sathyam Cinemas, Chennai.

== Soundtrack ==
The soundtrack, composed by Yuvan Shankar Raja, released on 25 January 2009, featuring 7 tracks with lyrics written by Na. Muthukumar was highly appreciated by fans and critics. The album grew in popularity, with particularly the song "Oru Kal" getting widely noticed, The song "Oru Adangapidari" features a short clip in which Jiiva's character imitates Rajinikanth's Padayappa character, with the vocal mimicry performed by Sivakarthikeyan.

Track listing
No.	Title	Singer(s)	Length
1.	"MGR Illenga"	Haricharan	5:10
2.	"Oru Adangapidari"	Shankar Mahadevan, Shweta Mohan	4:54
3.	"Eppadio Maatikiten"	Clinton Cerejo, Komal Ramesh, Nruthya, Shweta Mohan	4:48
4.	"Oru Kal Oru Kannadi"	Yuvan Shankar Raja	5:06
5.	"Thithikum Theeyai"	KK, Shweta Mohan	5:20
6.	"Oru Kal Oru Kannadi" (remix)	Adnan Sami	4:38
7.	"Oru Paarvaiyil"	Ranjith	1:36
Total length:			31:32

== Reception ==
The Times of India wrote, "On the whole, time pass when you have nothing else to do". Sify wrote, "If originality and a solid screenplay isn't your top priority and you want a bit of candy floss some sentiments laced with lots of comedy, then you might dig this one". Pavithra Srinivasan of Rediff.com wrote, "SMS has all the makings of a runaway hit with its cocktail of humour, love and the eternal man-woman conflict. But if you're a champion of women's rights, this one's not for you".

== Accolades ==
Ceremony	Category	Name	Outcome	Ref.
4th Vijay Awards	Favourite Song	Yuvan Shankar Raja (Oru Kal)	Nominated	
4th Vijay Awards	Best Comedian	Santhanam	Won	
4th Vijay Awards	Best Music Director	Yuvan Shankar Raja	Nominated	
4th Vijay Awards	Best Lyricist	Na. Muthukumar	Won	
4th Vijay Awards	Best Debut Actress	Anuya	Nominated	
2010 Mirchi Music Awards	Film Music Composer	Yuvan Shankar Raja	Won	
2010 Mirchi Music Awards	Film Lyricist	Na. Muthukumar	Won	
