= SPI Cinemas =

Indian multiplex cinema chain

Coordinates: 13.056355°N 80.259151°E

- Industry: Entertainment
- Founded: April 1974; 52 years ago
- Headquarters: Royapettah, Chennai, India
- Number of locations: 6
- Area served: India
- Parent: PVR INOX Limited
- Website: www.pvrcinemas.com

Satyam Cinema

SPI Cinemas was an Indian multiplex chain originally owned by the SPI Group, headquartered in Chennai, Tamil Nadu. The company was often lauded for its premium quality and inexpensive pricing. Its theatres, primarily PVR Sathyam Cinemas at Royapettah are often used by filmmakers for film premieres and audio launch events. Popcorn served at SPI Cinemas had received considerable praise from film goers and the media. In August 2018, SPI Cinemas was leased to PVR Cinemas and acquisition was completed.

The group was notable for being the first multiplex operator in India to equip its screens with the Dolby Atmos and Auro 11.1 sound systems.

== History ==
Sathyam Cinemas was originally named the "Royal Theatre Complex" and was built by Raja from Venkatagiri in April 1974. With a capacity of 1,255 seats, it was the largest multiplex built in Chennai at the time.

Kiran Reddy, the former CEO of SPI Group, revealed in a 2012 interview with The Hindu that the Sathyam theatre complex was acquired by his family "from someone" in the 1980s. It was acquired for real estate purposes with no intention of continuing the theatre business. He claimed, "The intent was to demolish the theatre complex. The theatre wasn't a viable business if you looked at the value of the land." However, when he got involved in the business, the family had made several improvements to the theatre. Reddy had taken over the business in 1999 and continued developing the theatre, adding three more screens and refurbishing the existing three.

== Acquisition by PVR Cinemas ==
After the on-and-off negotiations for years, the cinema chain was finally acquired by PVR Cinemas in August 2018. In August 2019, the National Company Law Tribunal (NCLT) New Delhi-branch approved the amalgamation of SPI Cinemas into PVR Cinemas with effect from the appointed date of 17 August 2018, PVR said in the exchange filing. With the acquisition, PVR became the largest multiplex operator in Tamil Nadu with 14 properties (including Puducherry) (as of 2018) and more in the pipeline. In 2021, PVR Cinemas mentioned that is looking to expand further in South by opening more screens in South Indian cities like Bengaluru, Mysore, Chennai, Hyderabad, Coimbatore and Vizag. In January 2021, PVR started the integration and rebranding of all the acquired properties in a phased manner. They also mentioned that all the future projects will be branded as PVR including the upcoming properties in the state of Tamil Nadu as well. PVR has also launched its private movie screening experience and its loyalty program 'PVR Privilege' across all the acquired properties.

In February 2023, PVR merged with its rival INOX Leisure to create largest multiplex chain in India. All the new properties opened after the merger with Inox would be branded as 'PVR Inox'. The existing properties would continue to carry 'PVR' and 'Inox' branding respectively. Before the Inox merger came into effect, PVR effectively rebranded all SPI properties except Sathyam, Escape and Palazzo as PVR Cinemas thereby getting rid of other acquired brands. Sathyam, Escape and Palazzo Cinemas were rebranded as 'PVR Sathyam', 'PVR Escape' and 'PVR Palazzo' respectively. PVR currently is in process of creating a unified rewards system in place of PVR Privilege and Inox Rewards that will be used across both PVR and Inox properties. A unified booking portal and app will also be launched soon in place of PVR and Inox websites and apps. Post the merger with Inox, with effect from 1 September 2023, the SPI iOS/Android app and website will no longer be available for booking and the customers will be redirected to www.pvrcinemas.com. In September 2026, Swaroop Reddy revealed that PVR's lease on Sathyam ends in 2036.

== Locations ==
State/Territory	City	Theatre Name	Theatre Locality	Number of Screens	Ref.
Tamil Nadu	Chennai	PVR Sathyam Cinemas	Royapettah	6	
Tamil Nadu	Chennai	PVR Escape Cinemas	Express Avenue Mall, Royapettah	8	
Tamil Nadu	Chennai	PVR Cinemas Perambur	Spectrum Mall, Perambur	5	
Tamil Nadu	Chennai	PVR Cinemas Theyagaraja	Old Theyagaraja Talkies, Thiruvanmiyur	2	
Tamil Nadu	Chennai	PVR Palazzo Cinemas	The Forum Vijaya Mall, Vadapalani	9 (including one IMAX)	
Tamil Nadu	Coimbatore	PVR Cinemas Brookefields	Brookefields Mall, Krishnaswamy Road	6	
