= Lucky the Superstar =

Indian Tamil-language children's comedy drama film

- Official release poster
- Directed by: Uday Mahesh
- Screenplay by: Uday Mahesh; Sabhapathy Shanmugam; G. Naren Kumar
- Dialogues by: Uday Mahesh; Sabhapathy Shanmugam
- Story by: Uday Mahesh
- Produced by: Kandaswamy Bharathan; Pushpa Kandasamy
- Starring: G. V. Prakash Kumar; Anaswara Rajan; Meghna Sumesh
- Cinematography: U. K. Senthil Kumar
- Edited by: Lawrence Kishore
- Music by: Songs: Hesham Abdul Wahab; Score: Navneeth Sundar
- Production company: Kavithalayaa Productions
- Distributed by: JioHotstar
- Release date: 20 February 2026
- Running time: 122 minutes
- Country: India
- Language: Tamil

Lucky the Superstar is a 2026 Indian Tamil-language children's comedy drama film written and directed by Uday Mahesh. The film stars G. V. Prakash Kumar, Anaswara Rajan, and Meghna Sumesh in lead roles alongside a Labrador Retriever. Produced by Kavithalayaa Productions, the film premiered directly on JioHotstar on 20 February 2026.

== Plot ==
The story revolves around a lost and exceptionally gifted puppy named Lucky, who moves from one place to another, innocently transforming the lives of those she encounters. As the puppy brings emotional healing to a troubled child and mends a fractured family, her presence eventually draws the attention of powerful political forces, leading to humorous chaos and unexpected turmoil. Lakshman eventually embarks on a mission to reunite with the dog after realizing the profound impact Lucky had on his life.

== Cast ==
- G. V. Prakash Kumar as Lakshman "Lucky"
- Anaswara Rajan as Keerthi
- Meghna Sumesh as Ammu
- A Labrador Retriever as Lucky, the puppy
- Subbu Panchu as Thengai Srinivasan, Lakshman's brother-in-law
- Devadarshini as Anu, Lakshman's sister
- Daniel Annie Pope as Lakshman's friend
- Aadukalam Naren as a rival party leader
- Madhusudhan Rao as Chief Minister Sabhapathy
- Mahanadhi Shankar as Inspector Dayalan
- Namo Narayana as Councillor Ganesha Moorthi
- Java Sundaresan as Dog hunter
- Elango Kumaravel as Kumar, an MLA's brother-in-law
- Vettai Muthukumar as MLA M. Marimuthu
- Gayathri Krishnan as Councillor's wife
- Eesan Sujatha as Shantha Nayagi, Councillor's mother-in-law
- Gowri Jaanu as Chief Minister's wife
- Muthukaalai as Kothandam
- Pondy Ravi as Politician
- Pichaikkaran Moorthy as a government official
- K. Bujji Babu as Doctor
- KPY Yogi as Jalsa Kumar

Voice cast

- Kovai Sarala as Sarala, a Labrador Retriever and Lucky's mother
- Rajendran as "Motta" Rajendran, a Kanni and Sarala's one-sided love interest
- Thambi Ramaiah as Ramu, a Beagle and Sarala's close friend
- GP Muthu as Thug Life, a black Labrador Retriever

== Production ==
The film marks actor-director Uday Mahesh's return to directing after nearly two decades. His previous films as director were Naalai (2006) and Chakara Viyugam (2008), and he worked as a screenwriter on Abhiyum Anuvum (2018). Mahesh conceived the film as a family entertainer.

== Music ==
The film score was composed by Navneeth Sundar. The songs were composed by Hesham Abdul Wahab, with lyrics by Arunraja Kamaraj, Umadevi and Parvathy Meera.

Title	Lyrics	Singer(s)
Niraa Maya	Uma Devi	Haricharan
Happy Lucky Day Chellam	Arunraja Kamaraj	Gana Bala
Eppadi	Parvathy Meera	Hesham Abdul Wahab, Shwetha Mohan

== Release ==
Lucky the Superstar is part of JioHotstar's 2026 "South Unbound" content slate, and was released on 20 February 2026. The film was dubbed and released in Telugu, Hindi, Marathi, Malayalam, Kannada, and Bengali.

== Reception ==
Anusha Sundar of OTTPlay gave 2.5/5 stars and wrote, "Lucky The Superstar is a light-hearted film which wants to take big steps. But its little feet and big ambitions do not go together. A film that has heart in the right place, but takes the wrong leap of faith". Akshay Kumar of Cinema Express gave 2.5/5 stars and wrote, "Lucky doesn't go all in on its wackiness. With the writing trying to build a house with bricks, a few walls end up being built with cards, and the film ends up as a mildly engaging watch, when it could have been much more".
