= DC (film) =

2026 Indian film by Arun Matheswaran

- Theatrical release poster
- Directed by: Arun Matheswaran
- Screenplay by: Arun Matheswaran; Arun Ranjan
- Dialogues by: Arun Matheswaran; Franklin Jacob
- Story by: Arun Matheswaran
- Produced by: Kalanithi Maran
- Starring: Lokesh Kanagaraj; Wamiqa Gabbi; Sanjana Krishnamoorthy
- Cinematography: Mukesh G.
- Edited by: Prasanna GK
- Music by: Anirudh Ravichander
- Production company: Sun Pictures
- Distributed by: Red Giant Movies
- Release date: 7 August 2026
- Running time: 142 minutes
- Country: India
- Language: Tamil
- Budget: ₹25 crore
- Box office: ₹100 crore

DC is a 2026 Indian Tamil-language action thriller film directed by Arun Matheswaran and produced by Kalanithi Maran's Sun Pictures. The film stars Lokesh Kanagaraj (in his debut as a lead actor), Wamiqa Gabbi and Sanjana Krishnamoorthy, with Kasthuri Raja, Thalaivasal Vijay, Krish Dayal, Avinash Raghudevan, Jawahar Sakthi, Sharath Ravi and Pranav Teophine in supporting roles. It follows an outlaw and a brutalised sex worker waging a violent war against corrupt police officers following the deaths of two innocent people.

The film was confirmed by Lokesh in July 2025 and officially announced by Sun Pictures that November. Principal photography took place between October 2025 and April 2026. The film has music composed by Anirudh Ravichander, cinematography handled by Mukesh G and editing by Prasanna GK. It was inspired by the Sarat Chandra Chattopadhyay novel Devdas (1917) and Bonnie and Clyde, an American outlaw duo. The film's title is an initialism for Das and Chandra, the lead characters.

DC was released worldwide on 7 August 2026 in theatres. The film received critical acclaim, with praise directed towards Arun's direction, the performances of Lokesh and Gabbi, the action sequences, and Anirudh's music. It grossed over ₹100 crore (US$10 million) against a budget of ₹25 crore (US$2.6 million), emerging as one of the highest-grossing Tamil films of 2026.

== Plot ==
In 2011, Devadas "Das" is an outlaw who leads a small gang. Driven by a personal moral code, he often delivers justice to those failed by the legal system. In his childhood, Das turned to a life of crime after killing his maternal uncles for murdering his mother over a family wealth dispute, an act of revenge that caused his father Motor Mani to disown him.

In the present, Devadas's gang robs a police weapons convoy. Around the same time, a corrupt Police Inspector murders a local farmer to steal money meant for his son's education. When the authorities refuse to help the victim's family, they turn to Das. Das confronts and kills the Inspector, promising the farmer's family that he will finance their son's education using the robbery proceeds. In response to the Inspector's death and the arms heist, the police assemble a dedicated task force to capture Devadas's gang.

While hiding at a lodge, Das falls in love with a singer named Parvathy. However, due to a fallout between Das and the lodge owner, he tips off Das's location to the police. A chaotic raid ensues, during which Parvathy is accidentally shot. Despite her innocence, the commanding officer Bhojaraj kills her – over the objections of another police officer Ashraf – to avoid a human rights scandal if she survives. Das gets arrested and is tortured to reveal the whereabouts of his gang, as well as extracting information on the stolen guns. During one such police raid, one of Das's gang members (Sebastian) gets killed and the police find one of the stolen guns in his possession.

The police then decide to kill Das in an encounter, but he escapes custody to seek vengeance. He tracks the lodge owner to a brothel and kills him. He also meets Chandra, an exploited sex worker, and due to her striking resemblance to Parvathy, goes on to help her escape the brothel. She joins the gang and later suggests blackmailing her wealthy former clients to replace the educational funds Das promised the farmer's son, which his gang subsequently lost.

While evading the police, the gang forces a family to shelter them. The husband alerts the authorities, but Das chooses to peacefully surrender to protect the family's young daughter. While Das is being tortured in custody, Chandra organises a violent prison break to rescue him. Following the escape, Chunni Lal, a deceptive ally offers to help Chandra start a new life, prompting her to confess her love for Das. However, Lal discloses their location to the police, resulting in a raid that claims the life of Karuppu, a gang member. Chandra kills Lal in retaliation, reducing the gang to just herself, Das, and a fellow gang member named Kitty.

Seeking revenge against Bhojaraj for Parvathy's death, the trio stages a trap by sending a false report to divert the police task force. Before the ambush, Das arranges a meeting between his estranged father and the farmer's family. He explains his path to outlawry, reconciles with his father, and hands over the promised tuition money to the farmer's family. With his obligations fulfilled, Das, Chandra, and Kitty launch a heavy assault on the pursuing police task force using bombs, rifles and grenades. They successfully overpower the police task force, killing Bhojaraj. After saving an injured Kitty and ensuring that Ashraf and the surviving officers get medical aid, Das and Chandra drive away together.

== Cast ==
- Lokesh Kanagaraj as Devadas "Das"
  - Madhesh as young Devadas
- Wamiqa Gabbi as Chandra
- Sanjana Krishnamoorthy as Parvathy
- Kasthuri Raja as Motor Mani
- Thalaivasal Vijay as Arasu
- Krish Dayal as Bhojaraj
- Avinash Raghudevan as Kitty
- Jawahar Sakthi as Karuppu
- Sharath Ravi as Chunni Lal
- Pranav Teophine as Sebastian
- A. Raajarishi as Singaram
- Balaji Deviprasad as Ashraf
- Attul as Rajarishi
- Manoj Sashi as Manoj
- Kalaiyarasan R as Raja Manikkam
- Franklin Jacob as Franki
- Dileepan K as Dilip
- Karna Raajaa as the DGP
- Baskar R as Angani
- Vijayalakshmi Veeramani as Vadivu
- Manthis M as Angani's son
- Dheepam Philipose as Yuvaraj
- Pream K. Seshadri as Samikannu
- Bigil Siva as a doctor

== Production ==
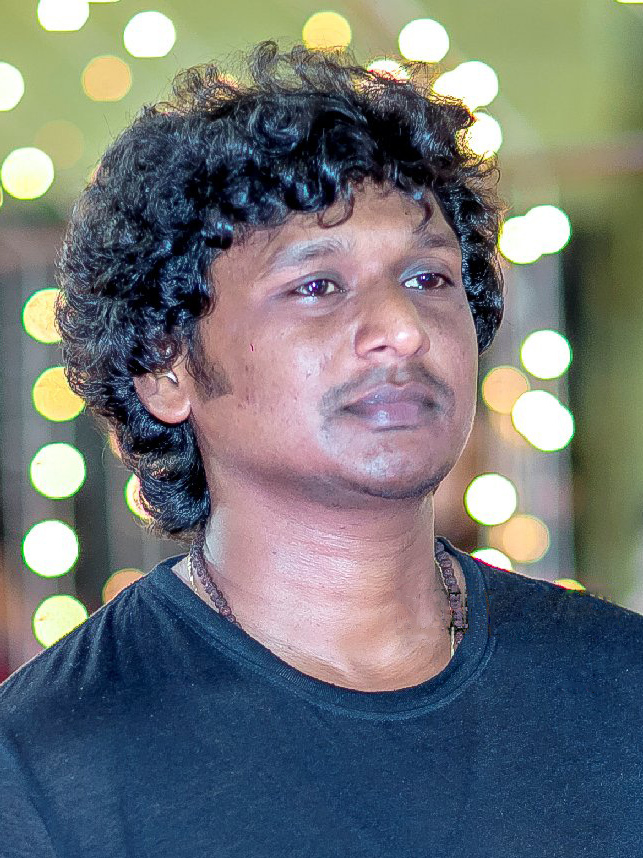
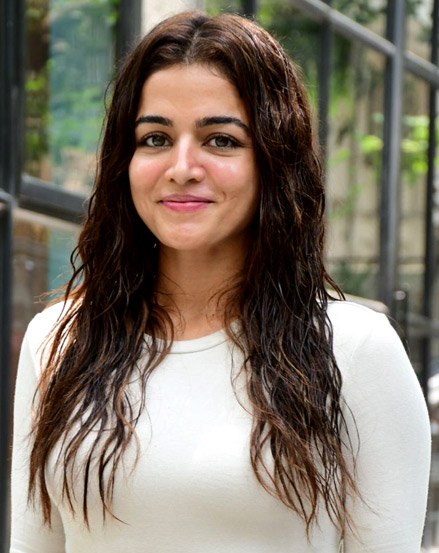
Lokesh Kanagaraj and Wamiqa Gabbi portray Das and Chandra, adapted from characters from the novel Devdas.

After the delay of Arun Matheswaran's Ilaiyaraaja biopic, the director reportedly began work on another project. Arun revisited a script inspired by Sarat Chandra Chattopadhyay's novel Devdas (1917), which he had written before making his directorial debut. He reportedly narrated the script to Dhanush during the production of Captain Miller (2024). It was later reported that Vijay Deverakonda was also approached with the script, but he declined the project due to similarities with one of his existing projects. Director Lokesh Kanagaraj was subsequently cast in his acting debut as the lead. Despite Lokesh's initial claims about Kaithi 2 being his next project after Coolie (2025), reports suggested that he would complete this project before beginning Kaithi 2. In June 2025, sources claimed he left for Thailand to train martial arts for the film. The following month, Lokesh confirmed the project and stated that a test shoot had been completed.

That October, sources revealed that filming had begun on 23 October in Chennai, and Wamiqa Gabbi was the lead actress. Sun Pictures confirmed the project on 1 November, titled DC; it is an initialism for the lead characters' names Devadas and Chandra. The production house confirmed Gabbi's casting, alongside the crew consisting of Lokesh's norm musician Anirudh Ravichander, cinematographer Mukesh G, editor Prasanna GK, art director Kannan S, action choreographer PC Stunts, and costumes designed by Arun himself. Arun Rajan assisted Arun Matheswaran with the screenplay, and Franklin Jacob with the dialogue. The director said the film, besides Devdas, was also inspired by Bonnie and Clyde, an American outlaw duo. According to Mukesh, the project was developed over a decade before and a number of actors, including Siddharth, almost played the lead role but could not remain because of the delays.

By late November filming was taking place in Madurai, and Gabbi was said to have done immense preparation for her role, including learning and perfecting the local dialect. The first filming schedule ended in December. Overall filming wrapped in April 2026, and sound mixing work was completed by early August.

== Soundtrack ==
The soundtrack is composed by Anirudh Ravichander, in his first film with Arun and fifth with Lokesh. The songs "Ain't Nobody", "Bloody Valentine". "Raga of Revenge", "Hangova", and "Bum Baa Diga Diga" were released as singles. The complete album, consisting of 15 tracks, was released on 24 July, while an instrumental number "Bloody Band" was released separately on 10 August.

== Release ==
=== Theatrical ===
DC was released in theatres 7 August 2026, and a special screening for Tamil film directors was held the day before. It was initially scheduled to be released theatrically on 31 July 2026, but was postponed to avoid a clash with Jana Nayagan, which secured a 23 July release. The first full-length trailer of DC premiered at the 2026 Cannes Film Festival.

=== Distribution ===
DC was distributed by Asian Suresh Entertainment in Andhra Pradesh and Telangana, by Sree Gokulam Movies in Kerala and Karnataka, by Dharma Productions in North India, and by Red Giant Movies in Tamil Nadu.

=== Home media ===
DC began streaming on Sun NXT from 4 September 2026 in Tamil, Telugu, and Malayalam. While the theatrical version received an A certificate (adults only) from the censor board, a U/A 16+ version (parental guidance for children below the age of 16) began streaming on SonyLIV from 16 October in Tamil, Telugu, Malayalam, Kannada and Hindi.

== Reception ==
=== Critical response ===
DC received acclaim from critics, with Arun Matheswaran's direction, the performances of Lokesh and Gabbi, the action sequences, and Anirudh's soundtrack receiving particular praise. On the review aggregator website Rotten Tomatoes, 92% of 13 critics' reviews are positive, with an average rating of 7.1/10.

Sajin Shrijith of The Week gave 5/5 stars and lauded Lokesh and Gabbi's performances, and Arun for "incorporating many fitting influences from world and international cinema in a way that doesn't look awkward, in a way that feels Indian". Latha Srinivasan of NDTV gave 3.5/5 stars and wrote "DC, a gritty and riveting gangster drama, is a superb watch thanks not just to director Arun Matheshwaran but equally to Lokesh Kanagaraj, Anirudh and Wamiqa Gabbi." Janani K of India Today gave 3.5/5 stars and wrote "At its heart, DC is less interested in glorifying violence than in understanding the grief that fuels it. Arun Matheswaran finally marries his visual flair with emotionally resonant writing, while Anirudh's career-best score amplifies every beat. The result is an arresting revenge thriller that lingers long after the final frame."

Neeshita Nyayapati of Hindustan Times gave 3.5/5 stars and wrote, "For once, a tale of a saviour trying to deliver justice in his own manner doesn't rub you the wrong way. DC is a beautifully brutal tale of people broken by the system that lingers long after it's done". Gopi Selva of Tamil Guardian gave 3.5/5 stars and wrote, "Although the plot, archetypes and themes are quite raw and stripped down, [Arun] Matheswaran thickens the film with metatextual references aplenty, rich visual texture and visceral emotion". M. Suganth of The Times of India gave 3.5/5 stars and wrote, "From Mukesh G's striking imagery and Kannan S's richly detailed production design to PC Stunts' kinetic action choreography and Franklin Jacob and Arun Matheswaran's punchy dialogues [...], every technical department fires in unison. One of DC's biggest strengths is the clarity of its writing".

Titas Chowdhury of News18 gave 3.5/5 stars and wrote, "DC isn't perfect. It sometimes mistakes ambition for balance. But when it locks into its rhythm, it's stylish, gripping and visually unforgettable". Yashaswini Sri of The Indian Express gave 3/5 stars and wrote, "DC has style, atmosphere, two compelling leads, a world-class composer and a premise that asks the right questions. What it does not have is a screenplay that knows how to answer them". Sreeju Sudhakaran of Rediff.com gave 3/5 stars and wrote, "the familiar problem remains in [Arun's] films hasn't disappeared: The style still leaves the substance struggling to catch up. Only this time, he manages to mine more emotional heft here than in his previous films at least in the portrayal of the bonding between the lead characters". Bhuvanesh Chandar of The Hindu wrote that the film "is slick with some superbly staged action set pieces, but its emotional undercurrents rarely live up to Anirudh's spectacular scores".

Vishal Menon of The Hollywood Reporter India wrote, "In a series of staging masterclasses, Arun finds crackling new ways to lift what's on paper to deliver a moment that feels satisfying in so many ways that you forget that you've perhaps scene this exact situation plays out in a hundred gangster dramas before". Bharathy Singaravel of The News Minute wrote, "Neither author Sarat Chandra Chattopadhyay nor Sanjay Leela Bhansali, who adapted the novel for the screen [...] could have imagined a retelling of Devadas with such an abundance of shoot-outs, but here we are [...] Arun Matheswaran keeps you curious until the last scene and asks many of the right questions along the way". Nandini Ramnath of Scroll.in wrote, "The story is as skimpy as the bloodshed is generous [...] Arun Matheswaran, who specialises in stylistically staged nihilistic violence [...] does what is expected of him. But he can't make a cliched story that is fixated on death come alive, nor can he justify the staggering 142-minute runtime." Adit Ganguly of Variety India wrote, "With so many creative ways to convey dialogue through silence, exquisite cinematography, or clever camerawork, it is an absolute thrill to see a movie where the music and background score do all the heavy lifting".

=== Box office ===
In India, DC was screened across 3,500 screens, opening with ₹4.4 crore (US$460,000) and grossing a total of ₹6.7 crore (US$700,000) worldwide. The film saw a 59.1% growth on its second day, earning ₹7 crore (US$730,000) domestically and ₹3 crore (US$310,000) overseas, taking its worldwide collection to around ₹18 crore (US$1.9 million). On its third day, the film earned ₹9.55 crore (US$990,000) domestically, its highest single-day domestic collection.

In its opening weekend, DC grossed a total of ₹31.86 crore (US$3.3 million) worldwide, becoming the second-highest-grossing opening weekend for an Arun Matheswaran film, after Captain Miller (2024). The film also scrored the sixth highest-grossing opening weekend for a Tamil film in 2026, right behind Love Insurance Kompany. It also surpassed its production budget of ₹25 crore (US$2.6 million), entering the break-even point. Its fourth-day collection ended at ₹43.90 crore (US$4.6 million), surpassing Thalaivar Thambi Thalaimaiyil and making it one of the highest-grossing Tamil films of 2026. On the same day, ticket sales on BookMyShow, the film's official ticketing platform in India, surpassed those of its opening day, with more than 152,000 tickets sold compared to over 146,000 on the opening day. The film crossed the ₹50 crore (US$5.2 million) mark on its fifth day. A week after its release, it had grossed ₹70 crore (US$7.3 million) worldwide. In Malaysia, DC ranked fourth among the top 10 films in local cinemas during its opening weekend. By its tenth day, the film had grossed ₹84 crore (US$8.7 million) worldwide, including ₹16 crore (US$1.7 million) from Kerala alone, making it the highest-grossing Tamil film of the year in the state. On 21 August, the film crossed the 100 crore benchmark.

As per Box Office Mojo, DC grossed over US$876,000 in the United Arab Emirates, US$100,000 in the United Kingdom, US$1,900 in Norway, US$91,900 in Australia and US$8,970 in New Zealand.
