= Captain Miller (film) =

2024 Indian film by Arun Matheswaran

- Theatrical release poster
- Directed by: Arun Matheswaran
- Screenplay by: Arun Matheswaran; Madhan Karky
- Story by: Arun Matheswaran
- Produced by: Sendhil Thyagarajan; Arjun Thyagarajan
- Starring: Dhanush; Shiva Rajkumar; Sundeep Kishan; Priyanka Mohan; Aditi Balan
- Cinematography: Siddhartha Nuni
- Edited by: Nagooran Ramachandran
- Music by: G. V. Prakash Kumar
- Production company: Sathya Jyothi Films
- Distributed by: see below
- Release date: 12 January 2024
- Running time: 157 minutes
- Country: India
- Language: Tamil
- Budget: ₹50 crore
- Box office: ₹73 crore

Captain Miller is a 2024 Indian Tamil-language historical action adventure film directed and co-written by Arun Matheswaran and produced by Sathya Jyothi Films. The film is the first part of a planned trilogy, and stars Dhanush in the title role, with Shiva Rajkumar, Sundeep Kishan, Priyanka Mohan, Aditi Balan, Edward Sonnenblick and John Kokken in supporting roles. Set in the 1930s, during the British Raj, it follows a British Indian Army veteran trying to save his home village from destruction by the British authorities.

Arun wrote the script in 2018 and Sathya Jyothi Films was to produce it. However, nothing was finalised then until 2019 when it started to come into shape. It was tentatively titled D47 (Dhanush's 47th film in a lead role). The film was announced in July 2022. Principal photography commenced that September and wrapped by late 2023, taking place in Chennai, Tirunelveli and Tenkasi. The music is composed by G. V. Prakash Kumar, with cinematography handled by Siddhartha Nuni and editing by Nagooran Ramachandran.

Captain Miller was released worldwide on 12 January 2024, the week of Pongal, in standard and IMAX formats. The film received positive reviews from critics and grossed about ₹73 crore (equivalent to ₹78 crore or US$8.1 million in 2026). The film become a commercial success. At the 72nd National Film Awards, it won the award for Best Feature Film Promoting National, Social and Environmental Values.

== Plot ==
Narrative structure
- Prologue: "Sivappu Sivan, Karuppu Eesan" ("Scarlet Shivan, Black Eesan")
- Chapter 1: "Gundarpuraanam" ("Tales of a Thug")
- Chapter 2: "Enakku Avan Saganum" ("I want him dead")
- Chapter 3: "Kurangin Nizhalil Paambu" ("Snake in the Monkey's Shadow")
- Chapter 4: "Kaattu Poonaikku Shivarathiri Virathama?" ("Do Wildcats Fast on the Great Night of Shiva?")
- Chapter 5: "Koramugathin Ezhuchi" ("RISE OF THE UGLY FACE")
- Epilogue: "Seneer Sadangu Por Thodangu" ("The Battle Begins with a Blood Ritual")

In the 1930s, during the British Raj, Analeesan "Eesa", a villager, wants to gain respect because of caste issues in his village, and wants to join the British Indian Army. This is opposed by Sengannan alias Sengolan, his elder brother, who is leading a revolution against the British. Eesa meets Velmathi, a doctor and the niece of the royal king, Rajadhipathi, and falls in love with her. However, he learns that she is in love with someone else and, left with no choice, forgets about her. He soon joins the army and is called "Miller" due to the British not being able to pronounce the soldiers' birth names, but brands himself as "Captain Miller". In one of their many missions, Eesa, along with his army friends, Rafiq and Sembatta alias Stephen, are forced by their General, Buller, to shoot innocent and defenceless freedom fighters at a public gathering.

When the soldiers are disposing of the freedom fighters' bodies, Stephen commits suicide out of guilt, prompting Eesa to kill Buller. Afterwards, he also attempts suicide, but Rafiq stops him and tells him to leave the army and return to his village. Eesa does so and learns that his brother was also killed along with the other freedom fighters in the gathering massacre. The villagers berate and throw him out of the village. During a skirmish between a group of revolutionaries and the British, Eesa helps the revolutionaries kill the Britishers through guerilla attacks and joins their group. Eesa and the group successfully orchestrate another attack against the Britishers, but he gets shot in the process. He crosses paths with Velmathi again, who treats him, and learns that her husband also died in the gathering. She tells Eesa to kill Riley, the son of a British Governor, to avenge her husband's death.

Meanwhile, the British government learns about a precious gemstone, which is 600 years old, from King Rajadhipathi and seizes it with the discreet help of Kanagasabai, Rajadhipathi's minister, who reveals the location of the gemstone under the temple's deity, Shiva. However, Rajadhipathi wants the gemstone for himself and gets Eesa to retrieve it, without revealing anything about it. He also asks his son, Prince Jayavardhan, to look over the entire operation and kill him and his revolutionary group after they successfully retrieve it. Eesa successfully retrieves it from the Britishers and kills Riley, who was also involved in stealing the gemstone and was responsible for the massacre that Eesa was part of during his time in the army. However, Eesa takes the gemstone and absconds to Ceylon as he realises Rajadhipathi's plan. A flashback shows Eesa and Sengolan's mother, Pechaiamma, dying due to injuries caused by the attack during the festival when Sengolan arrived. The Britishers torture and kill some of the villagers to reveal Eesa's whereabouts, under General Andrew Wandy's orders. The following morning, he returns to the village with the gemstone and attacks and kills the British soldiers who torture and kill the villagers, while chasing away Wandy and his men. The Indian soldiers drop everything and surrender to Eesa. One soldier, Muthuswami, tells Eesa that Wandy will return with an army of 700 soldiers from Veeravanallur.

Velmathi and the others safeguard the villagers and kill Rajadhipathi, while Eesa kills Jayavardhan. The villagers finally enter the temple, as they were forbidden by Rajadhipathi's family for 600 years. Eesa and the revolutionaries attack the army and are later assisted by Rafiq and Sengolan, who is revealed to be still alive and part of another revolutionary group in the Andaman Islands. Eesa and the revolutionaries, along with Rafiq and Sengolan, defeat the British army and safeguard the village. Sengolan tells Eesa that he felt bad as he realized that he is responsible for their mother's death, but Eesa denied as they realized if their mother would still be alive. The gemstone is instilled back in the temple, and the British Empire issues a heavy bounty on Eesa, Rafiq, Sengolan, and the other revolutionaries.

In the epilogue, Rajadhipathi's daughter, Princess Shakunthala, learns about Velmathi's involvement in her father and brother's death from a sly Kanagasabai. She sets out to exact vengeance on her, Eesa, Rafiq, Sengolan, and the other revolutionaries.

== Cast ==
- Dhanush as Analeesan / Captain Miller / Koranaar
- Shiva Rajkumar as Sengolan alias Senganna
- Sundeep Kishan as Captain Rafiq
- Priyanka Mohan as Velmathi
- Aditi Balan as Princess Shakunthala
- Edward Sonnenblick as General Andrew Wandy
- John Kokken as Prince Jayavardhan
- Nivedhithaa Sathish as Thaenpasiyaar
- Vinoth Kishan as Muthuswami
- Elango Kumaravel as Kannaya
- Jayaprakash as King Rajadhipathi
- Alexx O'Nell as Riley
- Viji Chandrasekhar as Pechaiamma
- Kaali Venkat as Kumastha Kanagasabai
- Bose Venkat
- Pintu Pandu as Kaali
- Merku Thodarchi Malai Antony
- Ashwin Kkumar as James
- Abdool Lee as Sembatta / Stephen
- Mark Bennington as General Buller
- Arunodhayan as Ayyavu
- David Michael Harrison as Thomas
- Abishek Joseph George as Ernesto
- Swayam Siddha
- Asuran Krishna
- Aasaan P. Selvaraj

== Production ==
=== Development ===
In 2018, Arun Matheswaran wrote a script which was to be produced by T. G. Thyagarajan's production company Sathya Jyothi Films. Arun had also shown the script to Dhanush, since he had written the script keeping the actor in mind. However, nothing was finalised and the project took shape again in 2019. In late October 2020, Arun had met Dhanush and discussed the possibilities of collaborating on that project. Impressed by the narration of the script, Dhanush showed interest in what Arun had presented. The project was to enter production after the latter had finished his commitments during that time. In April 2021, Sathya Jyothi Films was reported to produce the film, which would be Dhanush's 47th. On 24 December that year, Dhanush confirmed reports about his collaboration with Arun.

The film was tentatively titled D47, being the actor's 47th film in a leading role. In April 2022, multiple sources reported that the film was titled Captain Miller and that it would be set in the 1930s. In an interview to the media in late April, Arun revealed that the film was not about the real life LTTE rebel Captain Miller. He further revealed that it is an action adventure film which would be mounted on a massive budget to cater to a larger audience and would not have any item songs. The film was officially announced on 2 July that year with Captain Miller being confirmed as the title. The director gave that title because he was impressed by Tom Hanks's character from Saving Private Ryan (1998). The project went through a year of extensive pre-production for greater detailing. Arun recruited G. V. Prakash Kumar for composing the music, who had earlier worked with Dhanush in seven films. Shreyaas Krishna was hired to handle cinematography. However, he was replaced by Siddhartha Nuni during filming in mid-January 2023. Nagooran Ramachandran who was chosen for editing, had worked with the director on Rocky (2021) and Saani Kaayidham (2022) previously.

=== Casting ===
Arun started writing the script without any actor in mind. He created the fictional character Captain Miller with the intention of making an action film on a grand scale. It was only halfway through the process that he had felt Dhanush would be perfect for that role. The latter would also sport three looks in the film. In late May 2022, Priyanka Mohan was in talks to play one of the lead actress after Aditi Balan. while Sundeep Kishan was reported to play an important role that September. Both of their inclusion was confirmed on 19 and 17 September respectively by the production house. Nivedhithaa Sathish, John Kokken and Malayalam actor Sumesh Moor were announced as part of the cast the next day. Daniel Balaji, Elango Kumaravel, Viji Chandrasekhar, Swayam Siddha and Merku Thodarchi Malai Antony were also cast that month.

In October 2022, Arun met Kannada actor Shiva Rajkumar in Bangalore and narrated the entire story of the film in 40 minutes. Shiva felt engaged by his narration and expressed his interest in being part of the film, marking his second Tamil film after Jailer (2023). The production company officially announced his inclusion on 8 December. On 31 January 2023, there were reports of Kaali Venkat being cast in the film. Speaking to DT Next that day, Venkat denied reports stating that they were from unofficial sources. However, he said that he had been in contact with Arun but his role was not confirmed yet. Vijay Kumar was also reported by multiple sources to have been cast, on 24 February. Nevertheless, the next day, a source close to the production team clarified that he was not. In mid-March, Vinoth Kishan was announced as part of the cast. On 22 April, American actor Edward Sonnenblick was announced as part of the cast, marking his Tamil debut. In June 2023, Daniel Balaji left the project due to scheduling conflicts, caused by continuous delays to the start of filming his scenes.

=== Filming ===
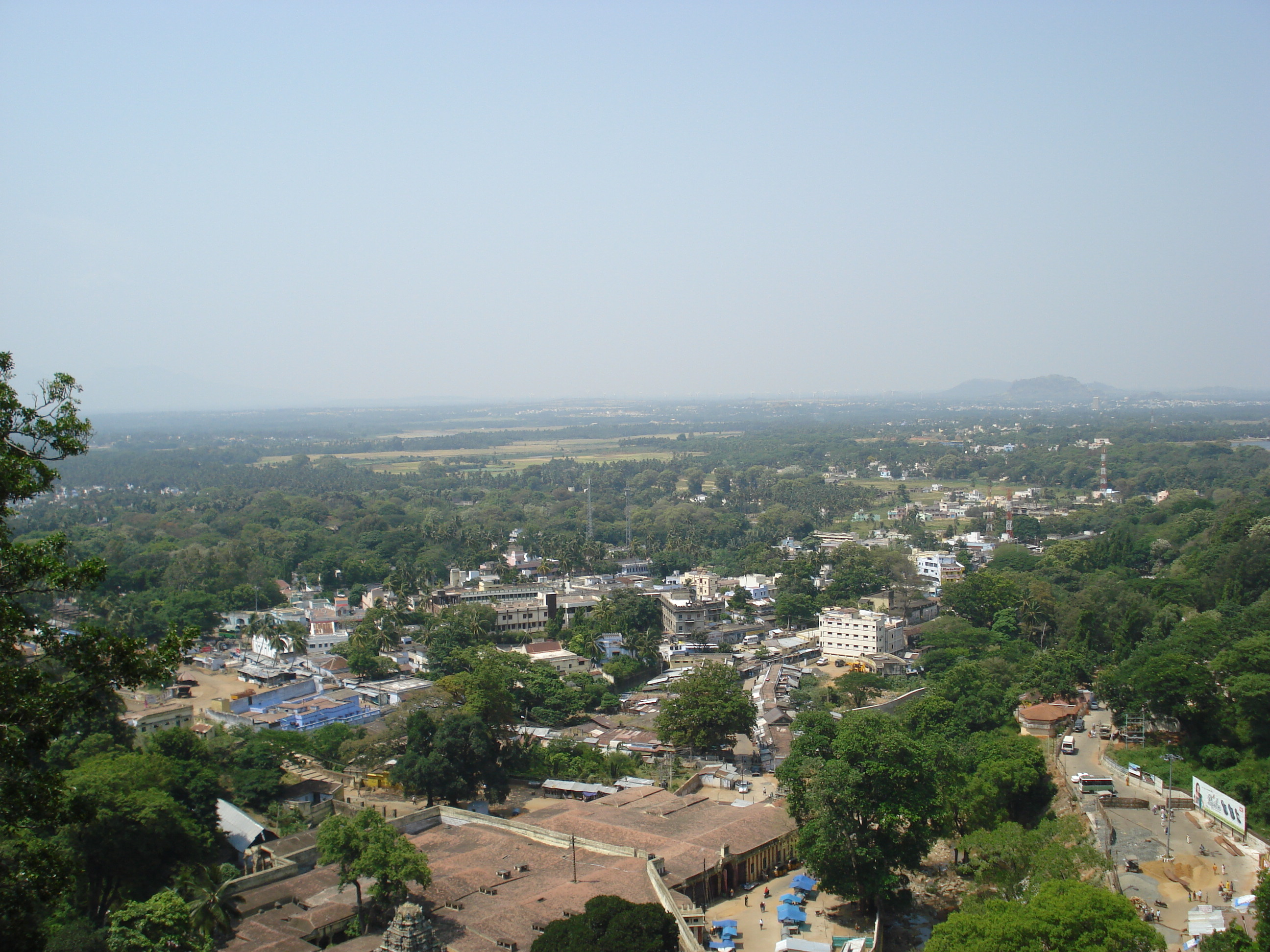
The film was mostly shot in Tenkasi.

Principal photography began on 21 September 2022, the same day as the film was launched, with a pooja ceremony at VM Studios in Chennai. Sundeep Kishan, John Kokken, Nivedhithaa Sathish and Sumesh Moor joined Dhanush for this schedule. On 7 October, major shooting began in Tenkasi. A set was also erected in the forest region of the district for filming main portions. This schedule ended rapidly on the 10th. The following schedule had begun on the first of December and Shiva Rajkumar shot action sequences along with Dhanush. That schedule was completed by mid December and the team took a break to celebrate Christmas, New Year and Pongal. Filming resumed on 19 January 2023, after the month long break, in Courtallam, Tenkasi. Filming was conducted at the specially erected sets in the forest region there. Sundeep Kishan joined the film's shoot in mid March. 80% of filming was completed by that month.

On 25th, a war sequence from the film's set had been leaked and went viral, which featured the blasting of explosives. It was later taken down. A couple of days later, the director refuted claims that the team was shooting in Kalakkad Mundanthurai Tiger Reserve (KTMR) and stated that the film was being shot on private land and necessary permissions had been procured. Following the event of blasting explosives, the residents of Tenkasi filed a petition against the film production team for breaching regulations within the buffer zone of KMTR. As a result of persistent complaints from the local community that day, Tenkasi Collector Durai Ravichandran ordered a halt to the filming. Nevertheless, the production team took appropriate measures to ensure the seamless continuation of the shoot, and filming had since recommenced at the same location following a brief hiatus. Shiva concluded the filming of his respective scenes on 19 June 2023. Sundeep's portions were wrapped up on 4 July; Kokken and Priyanka's by 30 August. Filming wrapped by October or November 2023.

== Soundtrack ==
Captain Miller

Soundtrack album by G. V. Prakash Kumar
- Released: 2024
- Genre: Film soundtrack
- Length: 17:06
- Language: Tamil
- Label: Saregama
- Producer: G. V. Prakash Kumar

G. V. Prakash Kumar chronology
Aadikeshava (2023)	Captain Miller (2024)	Mission: Chapter 1 (2024)

Singles from Captain Miller
- 1. "Killer Killer" Released: 22 November 2023; 2. "Un Oliyile" Released: 23 December 2023; 3. "Koranaaru" Released: 2 January 2024; 4. "Kombari Vettapuli" Released: 9 January 2024; 5. "Rise of Miller" Released: 11 January 2024

=== Development ===
The film's soundtrack was composed by G. V. Prakash Kumar in his seventh collaboration with Dhanush after Polladhavan (2007), Aadukalam (2011), Mayakkam Enna (2011), Asuran (2019), Maaran (2022), and Vaathi (2023) and his first with Matheswaran. Unlike Matheswaran's previous ventures, Rocky (2021) and Saani Kaayidham (2022), where he used minimal music (mostly relying on silence) to underline the isolation of the principal characters, the film needed background music for highlighting the emotional journey of the characters and felt Prakash was the perfect fit for the film. Composition for the musical score began on late-February 2023. On 29 March, Prakash revealed that he had composed the background score for portions of the film which had been shot, with around four cues had been shot to sync sound and edited with the filmed portions. He previously did for the "Celebration of Life" theme from Aayirathil Oruvan (2010). Prakash further revealed that the film's music will be reminiscent of Django Unchained (2012) and the compositions of Ennio Morricone in Western films. The recording and mixing of the score had been completed on 10 January 2024, two days before the film's release.

=== Song information ===
"Killer Killer" was the first single to be released from the album. In mid-September 2023, Prakash shared the lyrics for the first stanza of the song through his X (formerly Twitter) account which was written by Kaber Vasuki, and the second stanza on November. He further revealed that the song has been sung by Dhanush, who recorded his vocals at Prakash's studio in the same month. The song was released on 25 November 2023. "Un Oliyile" was the second single track from the film, penned by Vasuki and sung by Sean Roldan—collaborating with Prakash for the second time after previously singing "Sottangalla" from Japan. The single was released on 23 December 2023.

The third single "Koranaaru" is a dance number picturized between Dhanush and Shiva Rajkumar, and is accompanied with udukai, thavil and bass instruments. Deva, Santhosh Hariharan and Alexander Babu, recorded the track which had lyrics written by Umadevi. The song was released on 3 January at the film's pre-release event. The fourth single "Kombari Vettapuli" sung by Dhee, and lyrics written by Vivek, was released on 7 January. The fifth single track "Rise of Miller" written and sung by Arunraja Kamaraj released ahead of the film, on 11 January.

Track listing
No.	Title	Lyrics	Singer(s)	Length
1.	"Killer Killer"	Kaber Vasuki	Dhanush	3:40
2.	"Un Oliyile"	Kaber Vasuki	Sean Roldan	3:30
3.	"Koranaaru"	Umadevi	Deva, Santosh Hariharan, Alexander Babu	3:22
4.	"Kombari Vettapuli"	Vivek	Dhee	3:28
5.	"Rise of Miller"	Arunraja Kamaraj	Arunraja Kamaraj	3:06
Total length:				17:06

=== Reception ===
The Indian Express-based critic called "Killer Killer" as a "war cry" number, while S. Devasankar of Pinkvilla reviewed the song "Un Oliyile" as a "heartfelt romantic song" that starts with "a touch of poetry and carries a melancholic yet hopeful melody". The film's background score received praise with Janani K. of India Today wrote that Prakash is "his best form" in the film, with the "thumping background music, especially the 'Killer Killer' sequence, makes you root for the character." Gopinath Rajendran of The Hindu said that Prakash "retains his fantastic streak with Dhanush" with his music and the visuals (by Siddhartha Nuni) adding "great value for the film". Hindustan Times-critic Latha Srinivasan said that Prakash's background score and "Killer Killer" had "elevated the film" further adding that, "combining different music styles keeping in tune with the director’s style of filmmaking, GV [Prakash] has more than delivered on this project." M. Suganth of The Times of India praised Prakash, "who manages to bring in emotions lacking in the film with his fabulous background score [...] he has perfectly blended rural percussion with fusion that soothes as well as pump up the audience." Lakshmi Subramanian of The Week wrote "G.V. Prakash rocks with his background score".

== Controversies ==
In late March 2023, Marumalarchi Dravida Munnetra Kazhagam Keezhapavur union councillor Rama Udayasuriyan accused the film's production unit of causing damage to the Chenkulam canal bank and constructing a wooden bridge over the waterbody without proper authorisation. The councillor petitioned the district administration to take action against the film for these unauthorised activities. Moreover, the shooting crew allegedly camped in the buffer zone of the Kalakkad Mundanthurai Tiger Reserve (KMTR) near Mathalamparai village and carried out activities such as using high beam lights and lighting fires during night shooting, severely impacting the area's wild animals. During inspection of the Chenkulam canal for the construction of a check dam, it was discovered that the unit had damaged the canal bank and filled a portion of the canal with soil, which brings water from the Old Coutrallam Falls to around 15 tanks. The councillor stated that when he contacted the unit's authorities, they claimed to be acquaintances of Chief Minister M. K. Stalin. The councillor demanded that the forest department and public works department (PWD) take action against the unit.

Sources revealed that the crew had been camping in the KMTR buffer zone since the end of January and constructed a big set, for major shooting, on private land. A local farmer reported that an elephant, possibly disturbed by the noise, damaged several coconut trees on his land. When contacted, the Wildlife Warden of KMTR, S. Senbagapriya, stated that she was not informed about filming in the buffer zone and that the forest department had not granted permission for shooting in Mathalamparai. Rajkumar, an executive officer of Sathya Jyothi Films, claimed to have obtained permission from the forest department for the shoot and assured that the wooden bridge would be dedicated for public use after the shooting. However, it was unclear if permission was obtained for the set located in the buffer zone. The Environment Climate Change & Forests Additional Chief Secretary Supriya Sahu had stated that she would ask the principal chief conservator of forests to investigate the matter.

Post release, Vela Ramamoorthy accused the makers of plagiarising his novel Pattathu Yaanai, and decided to approach the Tamil Nadu Film Director's Association seeking "justice".

== Release ==
=== Theatrical ===
The film was censored by 4 minutes and 36 seconds in order to secure a U/A certificate for theatrical release. Eventually, it was released theatrically on 12 January 2024, coinciding with the week of Pongal. It was previously scheduled for 15 December 2023. The film was released in both IMAX and 2D formats.

==== Distribution ====
Lyca Productions holds the film's overseas distribution rights, and KRG Studios for Karnataka.

=== Home media ===
The film began streaming on Amazon Prime Video from 9 February 2024 in Tamil and dubbed versions of Telugu, Malayalam and Kannada languages.

== Reception ==
=== Critical response ===
Captain Miller received positive reviews from critics, with praise for its performances (especially Dhanush), music, visuals, storytelling, and themes, although some felt it was overstuffed. On the review aggregator website Rotten Tomatoes, 89% of 9 critics' reviews are positive, with an average rating of 7.7/10.

Sajesh Mohan of Onmanorama wrote, "Arun Matheswaran's Dhanush starrer 'Captain Miller' is a period drama that discusses present-day issues, and a must-watch in theaters." Sridevi S of The Times of India gave 3.5/5 stars and wrote, "Staying true to signature Arun Matheshwara's style of storytelling – like Sani Kaayidham – Captain Miller also has non-linear narration and broken up into 6 chapters and narrated in a non-linear fashion. The sixth chapter hints at a sequel. With a socio-political undertone, just like his previous films, caste discrimination is what rakes up the story and ultimately conveys a message that is relevant even today, despite being set in the pre-Independence era." Janani K of India Today gave 4/5 stars and wrote, "'Captain Miller' is a brilliant film to welcome 2024 with a bang, and it is a film that gets better with each watch. Watch for the epic climax scene and the union of different forces to fight against the Britishers. It's indeed a Pongal treat for Dhanush fans and all film buffs."

Kirubhakar Purushottaman of The Indian Express gave 4/5 rating and wrote, "There's not even a single moment in the entire 160 minutes of runtime where Arun Matheshwaran's script meanders." Gopinath Rajendran of The Hindu praised the performances, and wrote, "Despite a few shortcomings, 'Captain Miller' is a huge step up for Arun Matheswaran — whose style and socio-political takes need more praise — and is yet another feather to Dhanush's much-adorned cap". Latha Srinivasan of Hindustan Times also praised the performances and music, stating, "The bottomline is that Captain Miller is a highly-engaging – but different – must-watch film this Sankranti. Interestingly, the movie ends with a sure hint of a sequel in the works."

Priyanka Sundar of Firstpost gave 4/5 stars and wrote, "Captain Miller's progression from a simple young man to a man ridden with guilt and desperation, the cause and effect of his decisions, and its impact on his family, friends and community is a well-rounded story. Similar to Saani Kaayidham and Rocky, the visuals of Captain Miller are sharp, and extremely supporting of the narrative."

Sudhir Srinivasan of The New Indian Express gave 3/5 rating and wrote, "It's fascinating to observe how Arun Matheswaran has the film stepping forwards and backwards and slowly but steadily, constructs his story. It's really only in cinema that you could do this—and so, yes, while Captain Miller doesn't resonate as emotionally as his previous films did, his admirable signature and conviction is still all over this film." Divya Nair of Rediff gave 3/5 rating and wrote, "The heart of Captain Miller is in the intelligent dialogue exchanges where the characters talk about equal rights, dignity of life, and the true meaning of freedom. When you leave the cinema hall, what stays with you is the message of inclusion and the need to stand up for your freedom."

Manoj Kumar of OTTplay gave 3 5/5 stars and stated, "Captain Miller may be set in the period of the British Raj, but the themes, concepts and issues that it deals with feel timely and relevant." Krishna Selvaseelan of Tamil Guardian was less glowing in his review, awarding the film 2.5 out of 5 stars, stating, " Underwritten, focussing on 'mass' moments rather than being tonally/emotionally/logically cohesive and with a weak script, Matheswaran's shift to commercial cinema is sadly not a successful one."

== Future ==
In an interview with Ananda Vikatan, Arun Matheswaran revealed that he has planned a trilogy based on Captain Miller.
