= Nagooran Ramachandran =

Indian film editor

- Occupation: Film editor
- Years active: 2017-present

Nagooran Ramachandran is an Indian film editor who works predominantly in the Tamil film industry.

== Career ==
Nagooran's interest in editing began with his fascination for computers and media players. Nagooran completed an editing course in a Tamilnadu Government M.G.R Film and Television institute taramani and started doing small editing jobs, including one at Raaj Kamal Films International where he worked on behind-the-scenes video editing of Vishwaroopam (2013) and Vishwaroopam II (2018).

Nagooran debuted as an editor in director Sri Ganesh's film 8 Thottakkal (2017) and later worked on Rocky (2021), which faced difficulties releasing because of the COVID-19 pandemic. The film was released to a positive reception and gained appreciation for his editing. He also played a role of a dates seller in Rocky. In 2022, Nagooran then collaborated with director Arun Matheswaran again on Saani Kaayidham (2022) and parallelly with director Cibi Chakaravarthi to work on Sivakarthikeyan's Don (2022). He is now working on Dhanush's Captain Miller which also marks his third collaboration with Arun Matheswaran.

== Filmography ==
Key
†	Denotes films that have not yet been released

- All films in Tamil unless otherwise noted

Year	Title	Notes
2017	8 Thottakkal	Debut as editor
2019	Kee	
2021	Rocky	Also actor; 1st of 3 collaborations with Arun Matheswaran
2022	Saani Kaayidham	
2022	Don	
2023	Vindhya Victim Verdict V3	
2023	Kazhuvethi Moorkkan	
2023	Kick	
2023	Paramporul	
2024	Captain Miller	
2024	Rail	
2024	Adharma Kadhaigal	
2025	Right	
2025	Dheeram	Malayalam film
