= Parzaan Dastur =

Indian actor and writer

- Born: 2 November 1991 (age 34); Mumbai, Maharashtra, India
- Occupations: Actor, Writer, Producer
- Years active: 1998–2017

Parzaan Dastur is an Indian actor and writer. He is best remembered as the cute kid in the Dhara advertisement and the silent Sikh kid in Kuch Kuch Hota Hai by many Indians.

== Early life ==
Parzaan is an alumnus of St. Mary's (ICSE), Mumbai and H.R College of Commerce and Economics. He belongs to a Mumbai-based Parsi family and lives with his parents and younger brother. He is a proficient Pianist and has been learning since age 7.

== Career ==
Parzaan made his debut in the movie Kuch Kuch Hota Hai as a silent Sikh boy and became famous for his only dialogue in the film, "Tussi Jaa Rahe Ho? Tussi Na Jao." His other movies are Mohabbatein (2000), Zubeidaa (2001) and Kabhi Khushi Kabhie Gham (2001). He played Parzan in Rahul Dholakia's Parzania (2007), about a boy who goes missing during the riots of 2002 Gujarat violence.

Parzaan played the male lead in Piyush Jha's Sikandar (2009), as a youngster who aspires to be a footballer, but finds a gun, which turns his world upside down.

Parzaan also wrote, produced and featured in a short film called Pocket Mummy, with his partner Nitesh Ranglani (who directed the film) and starring famous actress Madhoo in a pivotal role.

== Awards ==
He was nominated for Stardust award for Best Child Artist for his role in Sikandar (2009).

== Filmography ==
=== Films ===
Year	Title	Role	Notes
1998	Woh	Siddharth Dhar	
1998	Kuch Kuch Hota Hai	Silent Sardar Kid	
2000	Kaho Naa Pyaar Hai	Mischievous Boy on Plane	Special appearance
2000	Mohabbatein	Ayush	
2001	Zubeidaa	Young Riyaz (Rizzu)	
2001	Kabhi Khushi Kabhie Gham	Ashfaque's nephew	Uncredited appearance in the song "Yeh Ladki Hai Allah"
2002	Haathi Ka Anda	Kinto	
2002	Kehtaa Hai Dil Baar Baar	Danny	
2004	Hum Tum	Hum (voice)	
2007	Parzania	Parzan Pithawala	
2009	Sikandar	Sikandar	
2010	Break Ke Baad	Young Abhay Gulati	
2017	Pocket Mummy	Siddharth	Also writer
