= Infinity (2023 film) =

Indian Tamil-language crime thriller film

- Release poster
- Directed by: Sai Karthik
- Written by: Sai Karthik
- Produced by: V. Manikandan; U. Prabhu; K. Arputharajan; D. Balabaskaran
- Starring: Natty Subramaniam; Vidya Pradeep; Munishkanth
- Cinematography: Saravanan Srii
- Edited by: S.N Fazil
- Music by: Balasubramanian G
- Production company: Menpani Production
- Release date: 7 July 2023
- Country: India
- Language: Tamil

Infinity is a 2023 Indian Tamil-language crime thriller film written and directed by Sai Karthik. The film stars Natty Subramaniam, Vidya Pradeep, Munishkanth and Charles Vinoth in the lead roles. The film was produced under the banners of Menpani Production.

== Cast ==
- Natty as Evvy Ilavalavan
- Vidya Pradeep as Nandini
- Munishkanth as sokku
- Charles Vinoth
- Tha. Muruganantham
- Vinod Sagar
- Jeeva Ravi
- Mona Bedre
- Adhavan as Adhavan
- Sindhuja
- Jeeva Subramanian

== Production ==
The film was produced by V. Manikandan, U. Prabhu, K. Arputharajan and D. Balabaskaran under the banner of Menpani Production. The cinematography was done by Saravanan Srii, while editing was handled by S.N Fazil. The film was released in theatres 7 July 2023

== Reception ==
Petchi avudaiappan of ABP Nadu rated two out of five stars and wrote that "Natraj is carrying the film as a one man army." Raghav Kumar of Kalki Online stated that "An Average Thriller!" Logesh Balachandran of Times of india gave 1.5 stars and wrote that "Natty's performance is the only saviour of the film, which has inconsistent background score and cinematography. Towards the end, the director even gives us a lead for the second part, making us fear the worst."
