= Social Currency (TV series) =

- Genre: Reality television
- Directed by: Sagar More
- Country of origin: India
- Original language: Hindi
- No. of seasons: 1
- No. of episodes: 8

Production
- Running time: 40-50 minutes
- Production company: Sol production

Original release
- Network: Netflix
- Release: 22 June 2023

Social Currency is a 2023 Indian reality television series produced by Sol production that premiered on Netflix on 22 June 2023.

== Cast ==
Eight influencers were part of the show

- Parth Samthaan
- Bhavin Bhanushali
- Ruhi Singh
- Vagmita Singh
- Rowhi Rai
- Mridul Madhok
- Sakshi Chopra
- Aakash Mehta

== Special guests ==
The series also features Badshah, Ashish Chanchlani, Sunny Leone and Kusha Kapila as special guests.

== Premise ==
Eight content creators are kept together for 21 days in a village with limited outside interaction. The participants are kept away from their friends and family as well their ‘followers’. They are given new Instagram accounts with zero followers as the access to their regular Instagram accounts is cut off. Social Currency is an influencer survival challenge where the participants showcase their best skills on the internet with their new Instagram accounts to compete for title of the "Top Influencer".

== Release ==
Social Currency first aired on 22 June 2023, on Netflix.

== Critical reception ==
The show received mixed reviews. Stephanie Morgan of the Common Sense Media describes the show as "A fascinating exploration of the influencer world." He further added that "Despite its flaws, Social Currency's unique, and unexpectedly deep, take on the reality competition show makes it undeniably watchable." Archi Sengupta of Leisurebyte in her says, "if you’re not expecting a lot from Hindi reality TV shows, then this will be quite entertaining." Ruchita of International Business Times says in her review that "Parth Samthaan is saving grace while the vulnerable side of Aakash Mehta will make you emotional."

== Controversies ==
Contestant Sakshi Chopra accused makers of Social Currency for sexually harassing her. She also accused the makers of the show of false assurances and fraud and said that she was even denied something as basic as food.
