= Right (film) =

2025 Tamil thriller film

- Theatrical release poster
- Directed by: Subramanian Ramesh Kumar
- Written by: Subramanian Ramesh Kumar
- Produced by: Thirumal Lakshmanan; T. Siyamala
- Starring: Natty Subramaniam; Arun Pandian; Akshara Reddy
- Cinematography: Padmesh
- Edited by: Nagooran Ramachandran
- Music by: Guna Balasubramanian
- Production company: RTS Film Factory
- Release date: 26 September 2025
- Country: India
- Language: Tamil

Right is a 2025 Indian Tamil-language action thriller film written and directed by Subramanian Ramesh Kumar, starring Natty Subramaniam, Arun Pandian and Bigg Boss fame Akshara Reddy in the lead roles. The film is produced by Thirmal Lakshmanan and T. Siyamala under RTS Film Factory banner, while the technical team consists of music composer Guna Balasubramanian, cinematographer M. Padmesh and editor Nagooran Ramachandran.

Right released in theatres on 26 September 2025.

== Cast ==
- Natty Subramaniam as Inspector Raghuram
- Arun Pandian as Sakthivel Pandian
- Akshara Reddy as S.I. Menaka
- Munnar Ramesh as SI Chella Muthu
- Vinodhini Vaidyanathan as Judge
- Thangadurai as Police Nallamuthu
- Sayaji Shinde as DIG
- Aditya Shivakumar as Jai
- Yuvina Parthavi as Varnika
- Roshan Udayakumar
- Redin Kingsley as Thiru
- Uday Mahesh as Nandhakumar
- Muthuraman
- Ashok Pandian

== Release and reception ==
Right released in theatres on 26 September 2025. Akshay Kumar of Cinema Express gave 2.5/5 stars and wrote "Put simply, Right works in parts. What stops the Subramian Rameshkumar directorial from being a better film is his choice of tools to anchor the two halves. The decision to drive the entirety of the first half with smarts and the second half with emotions has cost the film dearly." Abhinav Subramanian of The Times of India gave 2/5 stars and wrote "The single-location promise needs precise blocking and escalating stakes. Instead, the staging is static, reveals feel telegraphed, and the screenplay pivots toward a predictable social messaging track before looping back to the missing-boy thread. It gets a bit heavy-handed, especially in the second half; the death scene felt forced and preachy, which made it less impactful." Dina Thanthi praised the film for its innovative plot, while criticising the flawed screenplay and the easily predictable scenes.
