= Uday Mahesh =

Indian film director

- Born: 21 February 1970 (age 56); Tamil Nadu, India
- Occupations: Film actor, director
- Years active: 2005 - present

Udhayabhanu Maheswaran (born February 21, 1970), known by his stage name Uday Mahesh, is an Indian actor and director. He directed two Tamil films: Naalai (2006) and Chakkara Viyugam (2008). As an actor, he is best known for his portrayal of Vishwanathan in the STAR Vijay series Office. His portrayal of the character Chellam in The Family Man received social media attention and acclaim.

== Career ==
Udhayabhanu made his directorial debut with Naalai starring Richard Rishi and Madhumitha, film introduced cinematographer Natty Subramaniam as an actor. The film, a gangster subject was released in 2006 to mixed reviews and became average grosser. He again directed Natraj in Chakkara Viyugam, a crime thriller which was completely shot around Kolkata. The film was briefly delayed due to Natrajan's cameraman assignments and also crew complained the behaviour of film's actress Daisy Bopanna. The film was released in 2008 to mixed reviews.

As an actor, he played a small role in critically acclaimed Moodar Koodam (2013).

He played the role of Chellam sir in The Family Man was received by the audience.

Uday Mahesh is making a comeback to directing films with the upcoming OTT feature, Lucky the Superstar (2026).

== Filmography ==
=== As director ===
Year	Film	Director	Writer	Language	Notes	Ref.
2005	Yahaan	No	Story	Hindi	credited as Mahesh	
2006	Naalai	Yes	Yes	Tamil		
2008	Chakkara Viyugam	Yes	Yes	Tamil		
2018	Abhiyum Anuvum	No	Yes	Tamil		
2026	Lucky the Superstar	Yes	Yes	Tamil		

=== As actor ===
==== Tamil films ====
Year	Film	Role	Notes
2013	Moodar Koodam	Salim Bhai	
2014	Poriyaalan	Saravanan's father	
2014	Jeeva	Raghavan	
2015	Enakkul Oruvan	Ranjith	
2015	Maya	Madhan	
2015	Sathuran	Doctor	credited as Uma Maheswaran
2015	144	Feelings Ravi	
2015	Thanga Magan	Jen Builders Agent	
2016	Idhu Namma Aalu	Mylaa's father	
2016	Kabali	Durai	
2016	Kadavul Irukaan Kumaru	Priya's father	
2017	Naalu Aaru Anju		
2017	Sangili Bungili Kadhava Thorae	Vasu's father	
2017	Velaikkaran	Naga Sudarshan	
2018	Saavi		
2018	Koottali		
2018	Abhiyum Anuvum	Abhi's father	
2018	Imaikkaa Nodigal	Mr. Gowda	
2019	Kolanji		
2019	Nerkonda Paarvai	Deepak	
2020	Kannum Kannum Kollaiyadithaal	CBI Official	
2021	Vellai Yaanai	Almsgiver	
2021	Pon Manickavel	Moorthy	
2021	Kasada Tabara		Streaming release
2022	Yutha Satham	Police Inspector Mahendran	
2022	Taanakkaran	Nandhakumar	
2023	Jailer	CBI officer	Uncredited
2023	Are You Ok Baby?	Public prosecutor	
2023	Iraivan		
2023	Raththam		
2025	Nilavuku En Mel Ennadi Kobam	Preethi's father	credited as Mahesh
2025	Right		
2026	Anantha	Puttaparthi Doctor	credited as Magesh

==== Other language films ====
Year	Film	Role	Language	Notes
2013	Madras Cafe		Hindi	
2020	Serious Men	Dr. Namboodri	Hindi	
2025	Thammudu	Jai's coach	Telugu	

Web series

- The Family Man (2021–2025) (Hindi) as Chellam
- Farzi (2023) (Hindi) as Chellam (cameo appearance)
- Label (2023) (Tamil) as Ayya
- Space Gen: Chandrayaan (2026) (Hindi) as Sankaran Nair

Television

- Agni Paravai
- Office - Vishwanathan
- Pagal Nilavu- Sakthivel
- Mouna Raagam - Manohar
- Manasellam - Raja Sundaram
