= Gurumoorthi =

2022 Tamil language drama film

- Theatrical release poster
- Directed by: K. P. Tanasekar
- Produced by: Sivasalapathy; Sai Saravanan
- Starring: Natty; Ramki; Poonam Bajwa
- Cinematography: Devaraj
- Music by: Sathya Dev Uthaya Shankar
- Production company: Friends Talkies
- Release date: 9 December 2022
- Country: India
- Language: Tamil

Gurumoorthi is a 2022 Indian Tamil-language action thriller film directed by K. P. Tanasekar. The film stars Natty, Ramki, Poonam Bajwa and Manobala in the lead roles. It was released on 9 December 2022.

== Plot ==
Kandasamy, a successful businessman gets worried as his money was stolen by someone. He complains it to Gurumoorthi, a police inspector. Gurumoorthi takes up the case but finds various people hindering him. How will Gurumoorthi fights these people and finds the culprit forms the story

== Cast ==
- Natty as Gurumoorthi
- Ramki as Kandasamy
- Poonam Bajwa as Tamil
- Ravi Mariya as Selvam
- Shah Ra as Azhagar
- Manobala as Bheeman
- Rajendran as Nambiar
- Swaminathan as Google
- George Maryan as Guduguduppai
- G. Marimuthu as Veeraiyan
- Sai Dheena as Dheena
- Mohan Vaidya as Auditor
- Sanjana Singh as Saroja
- Boys Rajan as SP Office
- Rekha Suresh as Tamil's mother
- Samyuktha Shanmuganathan as Karpagam, Kandasamy's wife
- Madhusri as Kandasamy's girlfriend
- Ashmitha as Uma
- Yogi Ram as Petty Thief
- Vikraman Rajendran as Ravi

== Production ==
The film began production in January 2022 and was shot across the Nilgiris’ district, and in areas like Pondicherry, Putheri in Kerala and the border areas of Tamil Nadu.

== Soundtrack ==
Soundtrack was composed by Sathya Dev Uthayashankar.

- Kungfu Panda - Srinidhi Sriprakash
- Sekka Sevantha - Roshini JKV
- Ennodu Nee - MC Vickey, Smile Tupakeys
- Thaaragaye - Vallavan Chandrasekaran

== Reception ==
The film was released across Tamil Nadu on 9 December 2022. A critic from Times of India noted it was "an amateurishly made suspense drama that is crass, melodramatic and bloated". A reviewer from Maalai Malar noted that the film was "low on enjoyment".
