= Ruhi Singh =

Indian actress, model, and former Miss India (born 1995)

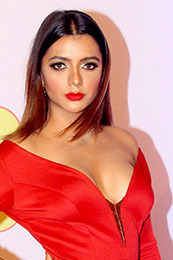
- Singh at the 10th Mirchi Music Awards in 2018
- Born: Ruhi Dilip Singh; 12 October 1995 (age 31); Jaipur, Rajasthan, India
- Education: St Xavier's School, Jaipur; University of Rajasthan
- Occupations: Actress; model

Ruhi Dilip Singh (born 12 October 1995) is an Indian actress, model and beauty pageant titleholder. She primarily appears in Hindi films and television. She participated in Femina Miss India East 2011, the preliminary for Femina Miss India contest and was crowned 1st Runner up. She later won the title of Miss Universal Peace and Humanity 2014.

Singh has appeared in Emmy-nominated documentary The World Before Her and acclaimed web series Chakravyuh and Runaway Lugai. She was recently spotlighted among the top 10 of The Times' "50 Desirable Women of 2020" list.

She was handpicked in 2014, by Femina Miss India to represent India at the Internationally. She began her acting career by starring at the drama film Calendar Girls (2015). Most recently, she was nominated for the Filmfare OTT Awards 2021 for Best Actor (Female) for her role in the series – Runaway Lugaai.

== Early life and background ==
Ruhi Singh was born and brought up in Jaipur, Rajasthan, India.

== Career ==
Singh's early dream was to become a successful singer. In 2011, she joined the modelling industry. She participated in Femina Miss India East 2011, the preliminary for Femina Miss India contest and was crowned 1st Runner up. The same year she entered Indian Princess 2011 and was chosen to represent India at Miss Model of the World 2011 contest held in China, where she placed amongst the top 36 quarter finalists. In 2012 she participated in Femina Miss India and was placed in the top 10. Later that year, Singh represented India at Miss United Nations in 2012 held at Miami. But the real success came in 2014, when she was handpicked by Femina Miss India to represent India Internationally. Singh worked in a Canadian documentary, The World Before Her. Singh was named one of the Top 25 Most Desirable Women in India (2014), by The Times of India. Most recently, Singh soared to the top of Times Most Desirable Women 2020, featuring at number 9.

Singh was spotted by Madhur Bhandarkar, who was impressed by her work in The World Before Her and signed her as one of his five leading ladies in his film Calendar Girls. The movie got released on 25 September 2015. The story of Calendar Girls focuses on five girls who hail from different regions of India, and who have been selected to pose for the country's most prestigious annual calendar which is a joint effort between business tycoon Rishabh Kukreja and his photographer friend Timmy Sen.

In 2021, Singh garnered rising popularity and critical acclaim for her pivotal roles in MX Player's latest releases: Chakravyuh and Runaway Lugai. Both series met with instant popular reception with charting at the No.1 spot within the first week of their release and were quick to become some of the most viewed Indian web series of the year. Topping off its commercial success, the series bagged a Filmfare nomination for the Best Series at the 2021 Filmfare OTT Awards.

Singh, while describing her performance in Chakravyuh said "My role in Chakravyuh was layered and I tried to retain the raw intensity it needed.".

In Runaway Lugaai, a gripping and entertaining drama series, Singh's performance as 'Bulbul' - a bold, small town runaway bride was not only critically acclaimed but was also extremely well received by the viewers. Singh, in an interview remarked "There was this sense of purpose and adrenaline pulsing through me, and I was mentally cheering on my character who so bravely decided to make an unconventional choice." Singh also bagged a Filmfare nomination for her portrayal as Bulbul.

Ruhi has over 12 million followers across Instagram, Facebook and Josh. Her latest show is: ‘The greatest of all time with Ruhii Siingh’.

== Media ==
Singh was ranked in The Times Most Desirable Women at No. 25 in 2014, at No. 23 in 2015, at No. 36 in 2016, at No. 41 in 2017, at No. 43 in 2018, at No. 9 in 2020.

== Filmography ==
=== Films ===
Year	Title	Role	Language	Notes
2012	The World Before Her	Herself	English	Documentary film
2015	Calendar Girls	Mayuri Chauhan	Hindi	
2016	Ishq Forever	Rhea	Hindi	
2017	Bongu	Janani	Tamil	
2021	Mosagallu	Mohini	Telugu	
2025	Mastiii 4	Geeta	Hindi	

=== Web series ===
Year	Title	Role	Ref.
2018	Spotlight	Deeya Sarkar	
2019	Parchhayee		
2019	Operation Cobra	Riya Sharma	
2021	Bang Baang	Meera	
2021	Chakravyuh	Sagarika Purohit	
2021	Runaway Lugaai	Bulbul	
2023	Social Currency	Contestant	

=== Music videos ===
Year	Title	Singer	Ref.
2016	Do Chaar Din	Rahul Vaidya	
2020	Maangi Duaein	Raghav Chaitanya	
2021	De Ijaazat	Ishaan Khan	
