= Sikandar (2009 film) =

- Directed by: Piyush Jha
- Written by: Piyush Jha
- Produced by: Sudhir Mishra
- Starring: Parzan Dastur; Ayesha Kapur; R. Madhavan; Sanjay Suri
- Cinematography: Somak Mukherjee
- Edited by: Dev Jadhav
- Music by: Shankar–Ehsaan–Loy; Sandesh Shandilya; Justin-Uday
- Distributed by: BIG Pictures
- Release date: 21 August 2009
- Running time: 110 minutes
- Country: India
- Language: Hindi
- Budget: ₹5 crore
- Box office: ₹82.4 lakh

Sikandar is a 2009 Indian crime drama film written and directed by Piyush Jha. The film features Parzan Dastur in the title role with R. Madhavan, Sanjay Suri and Ayesha Kapur in pivotal roles. The film has terrorism in the Indian state of Jammu & Kashmir as its backdrop. The film was known in its production stages as Foot Soldier. The film was released on 21 August 2009.

== Plot ==
Sikandar Raza (Parzan Dastur) is a 14-year-old schoolboy in the Kashmir valley. Ever since his parents were killed by jihadis (militants) 10 years ago, he has lived with his aunt and uncle in a small town called Kupwara in the Kashmir valley. All Sikandar's desires revolve around the happiness of his foster parents and getting the ball into the goal on the football field.

One day, on his way to a school football match, Sikandar finds a gun lying on the path. Despite admonishments by his newly made school friend, 14-year-old Nasreen (Ayesha Kapur), Sikandar picks up the gun and begins a journey into the darker side of his nature. The quiet yet strong Nasreen becomes Sikandar's conscience keeper. She tries to dissuade him from giving in to the lure of the gun.

Sikandar gets embroiled further and further in situations beyond his control, and people get killed. At first, it seems that the happenings occurring alongside Sikandar's predicament are not connected. But, as layer upon layer is revealed, it becomes clear that Sikandar is the innocent victim in a game being played out between the militants, the army, the peace-bartering politicians, and the religious heads of the little Kashmiri town. The pieces of the puzzle come together at the very end, leading to a shocking revelation. The movie is a portrayal of the molding of child psychology and the making of terrorists.

== Production ==
=== Filming ===
The film was shot at various locations, including Pahalgam, Uri and Anantnag areas.

== Cast ==
- Parzan Dastur as Sikandar Raza
- Ayesha Kapur as Nasreen
- R. Madhavan as Colonel Rajesh Rao
- Sanjay Suri as Mukhtar Masoodi
- Arunoday Singh as Zahageer Qadir
- Rahul Singh as Captain Yashvardhan Singh

== Soundtrack ==
Sikandar

Soundtrack album by Shankar–Ehsaan–Loy and Justin Uday
- Released: 17 April 2009
- Genre: Filmi
- Length: 30:40
- Label: T-Series
- Producer: Mahesh Bhatt; Bhushan Kumar

Shankar–Ehsaan–Loy chronology
13B (2009)	Sikandar (2009)	London Dreams (2009)

Justin Uday chronology
Sikandar (2009)

Track #	Song	Duration	Singer(s)	Composer
1	Allah Hoo	4:57	Hrishikesh Kamerkar, Yash Narvekar	Justin-Uday
2	Arzoo - Naat	2:00	Mehrajuddin	Shankar–Ehsaan–Loy
3	Chaal Apni	3:29	Hamsika Iyer, Hrishikesh Kamerkar	Justin-Uday
4	Dhoop Ke Sikke	6:09	Shankar Mahadevan, Anousha Mani	Shankar–Ehsaan–Loy
5	Gulon Mein	4:58	Mohit Chauhan	Justin-Uday
6	Gulon Mein - 1	5:17	K.K.	Sandesh Shandilya
7	Manzaraat	3:32	Shilpa Rao	Justin-Uday

== Reception ==
Nikhat Kazmi, film critic of the Times of India, gave it a 3.5 star rating.

Michelle Orange, film critic of The Village Voice, opined that Sikandar is "a Corking Narrative and Cognent Sketch of Violence".
