= Kaber Vasuki =

Tamil Independent Singer-Songwriter

- Born: 6 April 1990 (age 36)
- Origin: Tamilian
- Genre: Indie
- Occupations: Singer-Songwriter; Philosopher; Writer (Tamil)
- Instrument: Guitar
- Years active: 2008–present
- Labels: Saregama, KYN Records
- Website: kaber-vasuki.com

Kaber Vasuki is an independent Tamil Indie music artist, known for his philosophical lyrics and unique approach to storytelling through music.

== Early life and education ==
Vasuki was born in Coimbatore where he spent his schooling and early days. In 2010 Vasuki moved to Chennai. He would go on to produce the first crowdfunded Tamil independent album "Azhaghu Puratchi", and eventually starting the band "Kurangan" with fellow musician Tenma.

== Kurangan Era ==
Vasuki co-founded the Tamil Indie band Kurangan with Tenma in 2015. The band's formation and evolution represent a key moment in Tamil indie music, with Vasuki being the singer-songwriter in this journey with his simple lyrics in the regional language (Tamil). In November 2016, Members of Kurangan formed Terrace Jams - a space to showcase new local talents - inspiring artists such as Siennor, Othasevuru and Shilpa Natrajan. Despite being disbanded in 2018, Kurangan has a wide fan following today.

== Independent music ==
In 2021 Vasuki sold a phone demo of his song "Vasanam" as an NFT for 50 Ethereum (ETH), which amounted to nearly 1.5 Crore INR or 200,000USD at the time of the transaction. This event marked a significant development in the digital art and cryptocurrency spaces for Indie artists.

Vasuki's solo work continues to be characterized by introspective lyrics and a willingness to experiment musically. His latest music video "Poi" showcases complex themes such as recovery from toxic relationships and the psychological impacts of social media addiction, framed within the context of contemporary Tamil culture.

== Activism ==
Vasuki's work often touches on social and political themes, reflecting a deep commitment to addressing issues that affect society such as the Chennai Poromboke Paadal music video - a joint initiative by T. M. Krishna and environmental activist Nityanand Jayaraman.

His approach to music as a tool for social commentary and change highlights the power of art in influencing societal perspectives and advocating for social justice with songs such as "Pidikkum" and "Okhahoma" promoting LGBT awareness.

== Discography ==
Vasuki's discography includes a mix of independent singles and film soundtracks. Some of his notable tracks include "The Poramboke Song" and "Vasanam," with the latter being a reflective piece on changing attitudes and missed opportunities for expression.

=== Independent albums ===
Year	Album	Track Listing
2014	Azhagu Puratchi (first crowdfunded Tamil Indie Album)	Ulagathin Sonthakaran; Pachai Perundhu; Pirai Kadhai; Manda Mannan Kaviyam; Karpanai Kadathal; Chennai Paadal
2019	Kurangan Era (Collection of Songs from 2015 to 2018)	Neethane; Samudhayam Oru Mayam; Suthanthiram Oru Dabba; David Foster Wallace; Retro; Mugamoodi; Naan Enna Muttala?; Saakin Pokku; Vasanam; Rasathi; Rockstar; Oklahoma; Unnai Thedi Varuven; Poromboke Song; Vilangu; Jaathithaan; Manitha Subhavam; Nil. Gavani. Sol.; Rendu Perum; Ne Vekkam Kori
2019	Singles	Jananaayagam; Koothaadi
2023	Singles	Poi, Poi (alternative)

=== Film work ===
Vasuki has also made inroads into Kollywood, contributing to soundtracks for movies like "Captain Miller", "Dharala Prabhu", "Rocky" and "Aelay." collaborating with prominent Tamil Musicians such as Sam C. S, Darbuka Siva, G. V. Prakash Kumar, Hiphop Tamizha, Yuvan Shankar Raja and Sean Roldan.

Year	Movie name	Track Listing	Credits
	Magavu (short film)		Singer, Lyricist
2017	Kavan	Mathuraangalam	Singer
2018	Irumbu Thirai	Yaar Ivan	Lyrics
2020	Dharala Prabhu	Manusan	Lyrics
2020	Peipasi	Peipasi	Lyrics
2021	Aelay	Magaraasa	Lyrics & Singer
2021	Rocky	Naan Sinam Ariven, Vanma Padhaiyil	Lyrics & Singer
2022	Suzhal: The Vortex	Duvaa Duvaa, Suzhal – The Whisper of the Vortex	Lyrics
2023	Kolai	"Kelvi Mattum Thangudhey"	Lyrics
2024	Captain Miller	"Killer Killer (title track)", "Un Oliyile"	Lyrics
2026	Parasakthi	"Tharakku Tharakku"	Lyrics
2026	Scene	"Unakke Nizhalaanen", "Maayangal Saathiyam" & "Kombendhi"	Lyrics & Singer
