= Ishq Forever =

2016 film directed by Sameer Sippy

- Theatrical release poster
- Directed by: Sameer Sippy
- Written by: Shabbir Boxwala
- Produced by: Shabbir Boxwala; Ajay Shah; Harry Gandhi
- Starring: Krishna Chaturvedi; Ruhi Singh
- Cinematography: Faroukh Mistry
- Music by: Nadeem Saifi
- Distributed by: Friday Cine Entertainment
- Release date: 19 February 2016
- Running time: 125 minutes
- Country: India
- Language: Hindi

Ishq Forever (transl. Love forever) is a 2016 Indian Hindi-language romantic drama musical film directed by Sameer Sippy and starring Krishna Chaturvedi and Ruhi Singh. The film was released on 19 February 2016. Music is composed by popular composer Nadeem Saifi. This is a comeback film for Nadeem Saifi after almost a decade.

== Plot ==
Rhea (Ruhi Singh) is a free-spirited girl whose life turns upside down when her father gets appointed as the Prime Minister of India. The fiercely independent Rhea starts to feel stifled because of the security team that accompanies her wherever she goes. She thus jumps at the chance of an adventure through a mysterious stranger, Aryan Shekhawat (Krishna Chaturvedi), who she runs off with while on a vacation in South Africa, much to the anguish of her security team led by RAW agents Naina (Lisa Ray) and Amitabh (Javed Jaffrey).

== Cast ==
- Krishna Chaturvedi as Aryan Shekhawat
- Ruhi Singh as Rhea
- Lisa Ray as Naina
- Javed Jaffrey as Amitabh
- Chetan Pandit
- Sonal Jha
- Arif Zakaria as Sheikh's Associate
- Mahesh Balraj as Sheikh's Associate
- Zakir Hussain
- Gurpreet Singh
- Denzil Smith as Karan
- Sachin Parikh as Maheshbabu

== Soundtrack ==
Ishq Forever

Soundtrack album by Nadeem Saifi
- Released: 2016
- Recorded: 2015
- Genre: Feature film soundtrack
- Label: Zee Music Company

The soundtrack of the album is composed by Nadeem Saifi (Of Nadeem–Shravan).

=== Track listing ===
No.	Title	Singer(s)	Length
1.	"Ishq Forever (Title Track)"	Jubin Nautiyal, Palak Muchhal	4:55
2.	"Bilkul Socha Na"	Rahat Fateh Ali Khan, Palak Muchhal	6:39
3.	"Ishq Ki Baarish"	Javed Ali, Shreya Ghoshal	4:00
4.	"Oh My God"	Siddharth Mahadevan	3:21
5.	"Expectations"	Neeti Mohan	4:25
6.	"Mere Aankhon Se Nikle Aansoo"	Rahat Fateh Ali Khan, Shreya Ghoshal	5:17
7.	"Happy Birthday"	Nakash Aziz	4:17
