= Chalo America =

- Poster
- Directed by: Piyush Jha
- Screenplay by: Harshad Sharma; Piyush Jha
- Story by: Piyush Jha
- Produced by: Anil Pandit
- Starring: Aashish Chaudhary; Deven Bhojani
- Cinematography: Sunil Patel
- Edited by: Paresh Kamdar
- Music by: Charles Vaz
- Release date: 12 February 1999
- Running time: 94 minutes
- Country: India
- Language: Hindi

Chalo America (transl. Let's go to America) is a 1999 Indian Hindi-language comedy film directed by Piyush Jha.

== Plot ==
The film chronicles the misadventures of three Lukkhas (Slackers) with just one dream preying on their minds – to get to the kingdom of Coca-Cola and Clinton. They make attempt after attempt to flee from the drudgery and boredom in dreary India to the land of the free and the home of the brave – the United States. They remain undeterred by their failure and woeful incompetence to get there – be it by acquiring a visa or a wife, or smuggling themselves into boats. Their hopes flag, but never quite fade away.

== Cast ==
- Aashish Chaudhary as Surendra "Sunny" Pagnis
- Mandar Shinde as Rajat
- Deven Bhojani as Akshay Bandelia

== Soundtrack ==
Chalo America

Soundtrack album by Charles Vez
- Released: 22 December 1998
- Genre: Filmi
- Language: Hindi
- Label: Thakral Records

The music soundtrack of "Chalo America" was released on 22 December 1998 by Thakral Records. It consisted of eight songs and were composed by Charles Vez.

All tracks are written by Harshad Sharma.

No.	Title	Singer(s)	Length
1.	"Chalo Chalo America"	Remo Fernandez
2.	"Aasman Se Utar Ke"	Hema Sardesai
3.	"Dosti Ka Hai Yeh Nasha"	Chetan Shasital
4.	"Welcome to America"	Storms
5.	"Aa Gaya Hai Pal Bhar"	Uday Benegal
6.	"Bhool Jao Aab"	Sonu Nigam
7.	"Chalo Chalo America" (Instrumental)	Charles Vez
8.	"Yuhi Kabhi"	Zubeen Garg

Notes

- Track no: 4, 7 and 8 do not appear in the film.

== Reception ==
Suparn Verma of Rediff.com wrote, "The film could have been a light-hearted spoof on misguided youth who think Utopia is anywhere outside India. Instead, it deals with flat two-dimensional characters who move about purposelessly and appear too lazy to be worth the attention. And so, this film ends up being another cheap wannabe, just like its characters." Anna M M Vetticad of India Today wrote, "Chalo America is refreshingly different, part of an emerging genre of Indian films (Bombay Boys, Hyderabad Blues), neither crassly commercial nor heavily arty - just sensible cinema. But Jha would do well to remember that tuneless songs, however cleverly inserted, are dispensable and that bad extras are bad news."
