= Chakravyuh (TV series) =

Hindi-language Indian crime thriller web series

- MX Player release poster
- Based on: Anti-Social Network - An Inspector Virkar Crime Thriller by Piyush Jha
- Written by: Karan Shah, Chaitanya Chopra & Kailash Surendranath
- Directed by: Sajit Warrier
- Starring: Prateik Babbar; Simran Mundi; Ruhi Singh; Ashish Vidyarthi; Shiv Panditt; Gopal Dutt; Asif Basra; Ravi Pandey
- Music by: Faizan Hussain
- Country of origin: India
- Original language: Hindi
- No. of seasons: 1
- No. of episodes: 8

Production
- Producers: Applause Entertainment Ltd & Mayavid Online LLP
- Cinematography: Hari K. Vedantam
- Running time: 240 min

Original release
- Network: MX Player
- Release: 12 March 2021

Chakravyuh (subtitled An Inspector Virkar Crime Thriller) is a Hindi-language Indian crime thriller MX Original web series, directed by Sajit Warrier and produced by Applause Entertainment Ltd, Kailash Surendranath, Arti Surendranath and Mayavid Online LLP. The series features Prateik Babbar, Simran Mundi, Ruhi Singh, Ashish Vidyarthi, Shiv Panditt, Gopal Dutt & Asif Basra. The show is based on the story and characters created by Filmmaker/Author Piyush Jha in his third book Anti-Social Network, from his Inspector Virkar Crime-Thriller book series. The show follows Inspector Virkar who is out to solve a murder case that seems to be linked to cybercrime. The show was made available for streaming on OTT platform MX Player for free from 12 March 2021.

== Cast ==
- Prateik Babbar as Inspector Virkar
- Simran Mundi as Naina
- Ruhi Singh as Sagarika Purohit
- Ashish Vidyarthi as ACP Wagh
- Shiv Panditt as Roy
- Gopal Dutt as Dr. Sinha
- Asif Basra as Raut
- Ravi Pandey as Kaamat
- Anjali sivaraman as IP

== Episodes ==
=== Season 1 ===
| No. | Title | Directed by | Written by | Original release date |
|---|---|---|---|---|
| 1 | "Phishing" | Sajit Warrier | Based on Piyush Jha's book "Anti- Social Network", Karan Shah, Chaitanya Singh & Kailash Surendranath | March 12, 2021 |
| 2 | "Click Bait" | Sajit Warrier | Based on Piyush Jha's book "Anti- Social Network", Karan Shah, Chaitanya Singh & Kailash Surendranath | March 12, 2021 |
| 3 | "Malware" | Sajit Warrier | Based on Piyush Jha's book "Anti- Social Network", Karan Shah, Chaitanya Singh & Kailash Surendranath | March 12, 2021 |
| 4 | "Proxy" | Sajit Warrier | Based on Piyush Jha's book "Anti- Social Network", Karan Shah, Chaitanya Singh & Kailash Surendranath | March 12, 2021 |
| 5 | "Access Denied" | Sajit Warrier | Based on Piyush Jha's book "Anti- Social Network", Karan Shah, Chaitanya Singh & Kailash Surendranath | March 12, 2021 |
| 6 | "Side Jacking" | Sajit Warrier | Based on Piyush Jha's book "Anti- Social Network", Karan Shah, Chaitanya Singh & Kailash Surendranath | March 12, 2021 |
| 7 | "Trojan" | Sajit Warrier | Based on Piyush Jha's book "Anti- Social Network", Karan Shah, Chaitanya Singh & Kailash Surendranath | March 12, 2021 |
| 8 | "Anti virus" | Sajit Warrier | Based on Piyush Jha's book "Anti- Social Network", Karan Shah, Chaitanya Singh & Kailash Surendranath | March 12, 2021 |

== Release ==
The series was made available for streaming on OTT platform MX Player for free from 12 March 2021.

== Reception ==
The show was critically quite successful and rose to the no.1 spot on the charts in its first week itself.
