= Chakara Viyugam =

- Poster
- Directed by: Udhayabhanu Maheswaran
- Written by: Udhayabhanu Maheswaran
- Starring: Natty Subramaniam; Jayasurya; Daisy Bopanna
- Cinematography: Dwaraganath
- Edited by: Krishnamoorthy – Sivanandan
- Music by: Karthik Raja
- Production companies: Shree Ashtavinayak Cine Vision; Nataraja Arts
- Release date: 14 April 2008
- Running time: 123 minutes
- Country: India
- Language: Tamil

Chakara Viyugam: The Battle of Brains (transl. Wheel Strategy) is a 2008 Indian Tamil-language action thriller film directed by Udhayabhanu Maheswaran, starring Natty Subramaniam, Jayasurya, and Daisy Bopanna. The film released on 14 April 2008, and failed at the box office.

== Cast ==
- Natty Subramaniam as Kanna
- Jayasurya as Inspector Sathish Mishra
- Daisy Bopanna as Sandhya
- Anandsami as Sachidan
- Raaghav as Bose
- Bose Venkat as Dileep
- Vijay Raj
- Nellai Siva as Police officer
- Shankar as Kanna's friend
- K. Subash as Judge

== Production ==
Natty Subramaniam and the crew of Naalai (2006) collaborated for a second time for this film The film was launched on 30 June 2007 at Green Park Hotel, Chennai. It is produced by Shree Ashtavinayak Cine Vision, who previously produced Jab We Met (2007), which featured Natty as the cinematographer.

== Soundtrack ==
The songs were composed by Karthik Raja and lyrics were written by Snehan.

Track listing
No.	Title	Singer(s)	Length
1.	"Idyatha Kaanam"	Bela Shende, Karthik Raja
2.	"Padaithal... Kaathal"	Karthik Raja, Snehan
3.	"Idhu Thaan Chakraviyugam"	Bhavatharini
4.	"Neer Aadiduvoom"	Karthik, Sangeetha Rajeshwaran, Snehan, Kanishka
5.	"Yei... Unnidam"	Saindhavi, Karthik Raja

== Reception ==
Sify gave the film a rating of two out of five stars and stated that "No two ways about it, the film is an unmitigated endurance test". Malathi Rangarajan of The Hindu wrote, "If you dig suspense and thrill and are willing to take a few protracted scenes in your stride, Chakravyugam could be up your alley".
