= King of Bollywood =

2004 Indian Film

- Directed by: Piyush Jha
- Written by: Piyush Jha
- Produced by: Piyush Jha
- Starring: Om Puri; Sophie Dahl; Murli Sharma; Manoj Pahwa
- Cinematography: Piyush Jha
- Edited by: Piyush Jha
- Music by: Smoke, Ashutosh Phatak and Sanjay Divecha
- Distributed by: iDream Production (through SPE Films India)
- Release date: 24 September 2004
- Running time: 116 minutes
- Country: India
- Languages: Hindi; English

King of Bollywood is a 2004 British-Indian English and Hindi language comedy film written, edited, directed and produced by Piyush Jha, starring Om Puri in the lead role. The film is a satire of the Hindi film industry (Bollywood).

== Plot ==
British journalist Crystal Chaurasia decides to make a documentary about a faded Bollywood star of yesteryear, Karan Kumar. She follows KK as he tries to make his comeback with a new movie. Meanwhile, his son Rahul disapproves of his efforts, but he increasingly comes to like Crystal.

== Cast ==
- Om Puri as Karan Kumar ("KK")
- Sophie Dahl as Crystal Chaurasia
- Diwakar Pundir as Rahul
- Kavita Kapoor as Mandira Kumar
- Manoj Pahwa as Ratnesh, Karan Kumar's secretary
- Murali Sharma as Sunny

== Release ==
The film released worldwide on 24 September 2004.

== Music ==
1. "My Heart Goes Dhak Dhak All The Time" (Kay Kay)
2. "King of Bollywood" (Chetan Shashital)
3. "Tu Hai Sehari Babu, Babu" (Shreya Ghoshal, Shaan)
4. "Road Dancer, Road Dancer" (Kunal Ganjawala)
5. "Pyaar Me Haar" (Vijay Prakash, Kunal Ganjawala)
