= Natty Subramaniam =

Indian actor (born 1971)

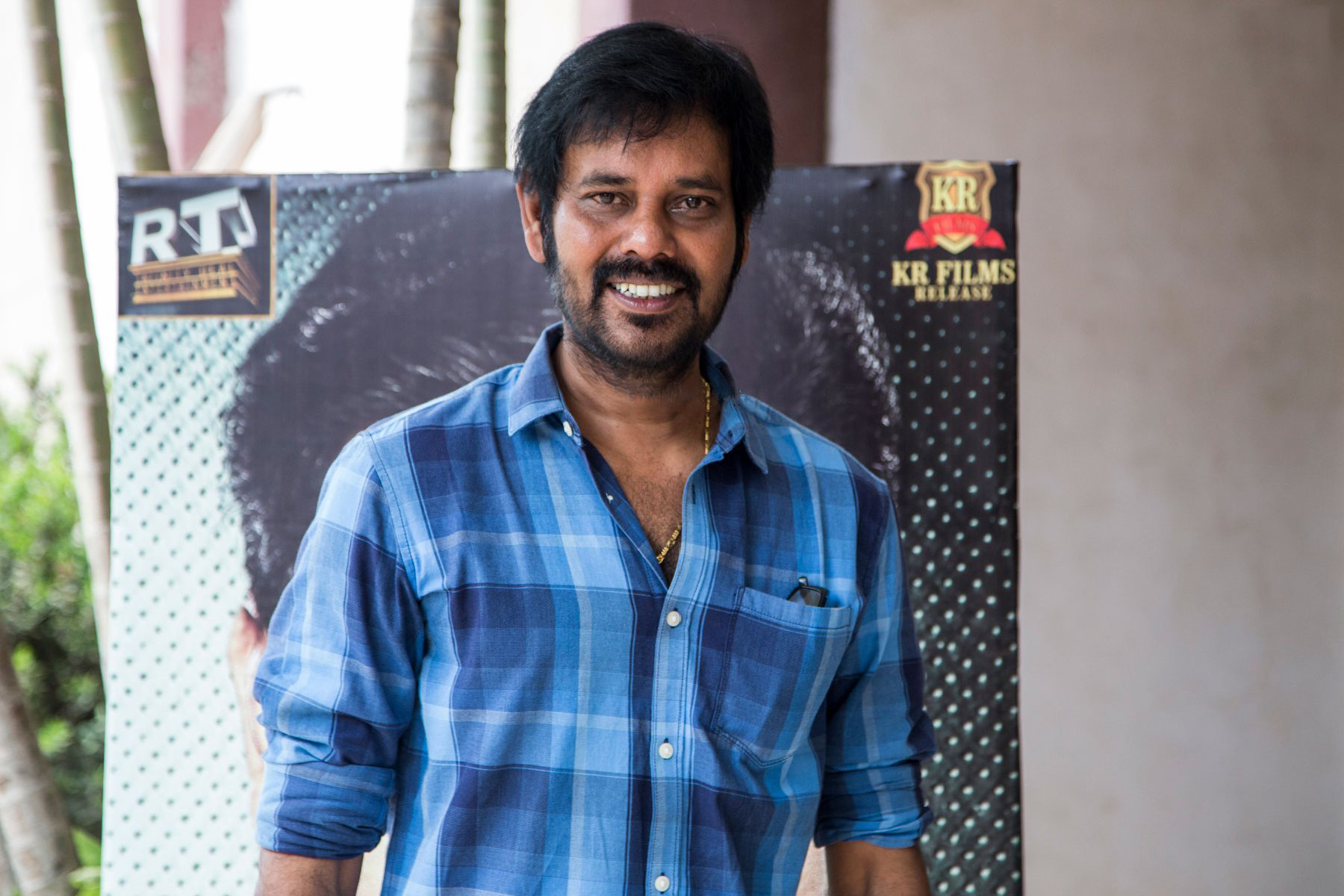
- Born: Natarajan Subramaniam; 23 June 1971 (age 55)
- Occupations: Cinematographer; Actor
- Years active: 1999–present

Natarajan "Natty" Subramaniam (/nətti/ born 23 June 1971) is an Indian cinematographer and actor who works in Hindi and Tamil films. As an actor, he achieved recognition through his performance as a con artist in Sathuranga Vettai (2014).

== Early life ==
Born into a Tamil-speaking family, Natarajan "Natty" pursued an interest in photography and quit school at 18, choosing to take up a series of odd jobs to fund his interest rather than going through college. He worked as a still photographer at weddings, and then performed as a videographer at ceremonies. He briefly assisted cinematographer B. R. Vijayalakshmi but was unable to get a break in the film industry, so he chose to work on documentaries instead, before venturing into work on commercials and music videos. He shot videos of the music band Euphoria's first album, and his work was well received.

== Career ==
Natty became acquainted with director Ram Gopal Varma and the pair discussed a film project which did not materialise, before he was recommended by Varma to Anurag Kashyap, whom he worked with for three Hindi projects - Last Train to Mahakali (1999), Paanch (2003), and Black Friday (2004). In between he had also worked for Tamil romantic-comedy Youth (2002) starring Vijay, and had briefly agreed to be a part of AR Murugadoss's Ramanaa (2001), which he later opted out from. Despite being active in Tamil films, he has chosen to prioritise work as a cinematographer in Hindi films, working on successful films including Jab We Met (2007), Golmaal Returns (2008), Raanjhanaa (2013) and Holiday: A Soldier Is Never Off Duty (2014).

Away from cinematography in big-budget Hindi films, Natarajan has embarked on an alternate career as an actor in small-budget Tamil films. He initially appeared in two films by his friend Uday Mahesh, Naalai (2006) and Chakkara Viyugam (2008), both of which went unnoticed at the box office but he won positive acclaim for his performance in Naalai. He starred in two further action-masala films aimed at the village and town audiences, Milaga (2010) and Muthukku Muthaaga (2011), which received similar lukewarm responses.

In 2014, Natarajan featured in the Tamil caper film, Sathuranga Vettai directed by newcomer Vinoth and produced by Manobala. The film opened to positive reviews and became a surprise success at the box office, with a critic noting Natarajan "is brilliant as Gandhi Babu. He does his part with relish using his brains more than brawn with expressive body and eye language". However, his 2015 action film Katham Katham is not very impressive. Once again, Natty plays the good-man-turned-evil-mind, whose biggest weakness is spondulicks. His dialogue delivery is titch and screen presence, casual, on a believable act of bad cop. In 2017, he had three film releases including Enkitta Mothathe, Bongu and Richie. In 2018, Natty was approached by the duo directors Hari and Harish for a thriller titled "Silk" which is supposed to be a Kanchipuram-based storyline, but the shooting has not yet been started. In Pandiraj's Namma Veettu Pillai (2019), he has a muscular presence, perfect for a character actor. He acted in the lead role in Sandimuni (2020) and Godfather (2020). He has played an important role in Sibi's cop drama Walter (2020), which was directed by U. Anbarasan. Natty experienced playing the ruthless cop Kannabiran in Mari Selvaraj in Karnan (2021). The film was Natty's second collaboration with Dhanush, the first being as the cinematographer of the latter's Hindi debut, Raanjhanaa. In 2022, he was cast in the Tamil-Malayalam bilingual Yugi and play in the drama film Gurumoorthi. Then, he has starred in thriller films such as Infinity (2023), Web (2023) in lead roles, who have suffered failures. Natty has grabbed the attention of the audience through his role as a cop in Maharaja (2024) featuring Vijay Sethupathi in the lead role. Maharaja garnered widespread critical and commercial acclaim. In 2025, he appeared as a police inspector in the thriller films Seesaw and Right.

== Filmography ==
=== As actor ===
Key
†	Denotes films that have not yet been released

Year	Film	Role	Notes
2002	Youth	Customer	Uncredited
2006	Naalai	Natty	
2008	Chakkara Viyugam	Kanna	
2010	Milaga	Azhagar	
2011	Muthukku Muthaaga	Raman	
2014	Sathuranga Vettai	Gandhi Babu	
2014	Jeeva	Man at bar	Special appearance in "Oru Rosa" song
2015	Katham Katham	Pandiyan	
2017	Engitta Modhathey	Ravi	
2017	Bongu	Deva	
2017	Richie	Selva	
2019	Namma Veettu Pillai	Ayyanar	
2020	Sandimuni	Sandimuni	
2020	Godfather	Adhyamaan	
2020	Walter	Arjun Sampath	
2021	Karnan	Kannabiran	
2022	Yugi	Sethu	
2022	Gurumoorthi	Gurumoorthi	
2023	Bakasuran	Arulvarman	
2023	Infinity	Evvy	
2023	Web	Veera	
2024	Maharaja	S. Varadharajan	
2024	Kadaisi Ulaga Por	Kingmaker Nataraj	
2024	Brother	Aravind	
2024	Kanguva	Koduvan	
2024	Sorgavaasal	Ismail	
2025	Seesaw	Inspector Mugilan	
2025	Niram Marum Ulagil	Abdul Malik	
2025	Right	Inspector Raghuram	
2025	Kambi Katna Kathai	Arivu	
2026	Draupathi 2	Veera Vallalar	
2026	Vadam	Rathnavel	
2026	TN 2026	Kulkanth Kumar	
2026	Karuppu	Chief Metropolitan Magistrate Rajanayagam	
2026	Dark	Balachander	
2026	Idhayam Murali	Thanga, Murali's uncle	

==== Television ====
Year	Title	Role	Network
2022	Victim	Madasamy	SonyLIV

=== As cinematographer ===
Year	Film	Language	Notes
1999	Last Train to Mahakali	Hindi	Short Film
2002	Youth	Tamil	Debut Tamil film
2003	Paanch	Hindi	Debut Hindi film Unreleased
2004	Black Friday	Hindi	
2005	Parineeta	Hindi	
2007	Eklavya: The Royal Guard	Hindi	
2007	Jab We Met	Hindi	
2008	Phir Kabhi	Hindi	
2008	Halla Bol	Hindi	
2008	Golmaal Returns	Hindi	
2009	Love Aaj Kal	Hindi	
2010	Lafangey Parindey	Hindi	
2010	Knock Out	Hindi	
2011	Desi Boyz	Hindi	
2012	Thuppakki	Tamil	"Vennilave" song only
2013	Raanjhanaa	Hindi	
2014	Holiday: A Soldier Is Never Off Duty	Hindi	
2015	Puli	Tamil	
2016	A Aa	Telugu	Debut Telugu film
2017	My Story	Malayalam	
2018	Chal Mohan Ranga	Telugu	
2024	Bad Newz	Hindi	"Raula Raula" song only
