= Siennor =

Indian independent singer-songwriter

- Origin: Chennai, Tamil Nadu, India
- Genres: Tamil indie, indie pop, experimental pop, electronic pop
- Occupations: Singer-songwriter, composer, lyricist
- Years active: 2017–present
- Label: Independent

Siennor is a singer-songwriter associated with the Tamil independent music movement. He is known for combining indie pop, electronic music, spoken word and experimental songwriting.

== Early life and career ==
Siennor was a pianist during his school years and later a self-taught guitarist. He started writing songs at the age of seventeen, initially started with rap and hip-hop before moving towards Tamil indie music.

In college, Siennor formed the electronic contemporary band The Endless Knot, which performed musical adaptations of poems by Subramania Bharati and Bharathidasan. Following the band's dissolution, he formed the Siennor Trio, alongside bassist Kabeeb and drummer Gowtham Healer.

== Kurangan Era ==
Prior to his solo career, Siennor was the keyboardist of the Tamil indie band Kurangan. Kurangan has often been described as one of the pioneering groups of the modern Tamil indie movement. In an interview, Siennor stated that Kaber Vasuki and Tenma encouraged him to release his own music online, leading to the publication of songs such as Kanne and Ponnira Maalai.

== Musical style ==
Siennor has described himself as an experimental musician. His work combines elements of electronic music, classical influences and spoken-word performance. His songs often focus on emotions, relationships, urban life and philosophical themes. Oh Maha Raaniye and Muyal Thottam were featured on BBC Asian Network after gaining attention through Terrace Jams performances.

== Agappor ==
In 2019, Siennor announced Agappor as an electro-acoustic extended play consisting of six songs. Siennor describes Agappor as a work centred on personal conflict and emotional growth, recorded largely with live instrumentation using an eight-piece ensemble.

== Discography ==
Year	Title	Notes
2017	"Kanne"	
2017	"Ponnira Maalai"	
2017	"Oh Maha Raaniye"	
2017	"Muyal Thottam"	
2017	"Vaa Uyire"	
2020	"Unnai Dhaan"	
2020	"Poruppu"	
2020	"Orey Oru"	
2020	"Rosa (Naan Vaaren)"	
2021	"Innum Enna"	
2022	"Yosikadhey"	
2022	"Un Arugil"	
2023	"Tharunangal"	
2023	"Nee Yaar Naan Yaar"	
2023	"Kaathodu Thoosaaga"	featuring Swagatha S. Krishnan
2023	"Sorgam Kaanalaam"	
2025	"Manasu Mattume"	
2025	"GILUGILUPPU"	featuring Maya S. Krishnan
