= Bongu (film) =

2017 Indian film by Taj

- Theatrical release poster
- Directed by: Taj
- Written by: Taj
- Produced by: Raghukumar; Rajarathnam; Sritharan
- Starring: Natty Subramaniam; Ruhi Singh
- Cinematography: Mahesh Muthuswami
- Edited by: Gopi Krishna
- Music by: Srikanth Deva
- Production company: RT Infinity Deal Entertainment
- Distributed by: KR Films
- Release date: 2 June 2017
- Country: India
- Language: Tamil

Bongu (transl. Cheating) is a 2017 Indian Tamil-language heist film written and directed by Taj. The film stars Natty Subramaniam and Ruhi Singh, while Pooja Bisht plays a pivotal supporting role. Production for the film began in late 2015.

== Cast ==
- Natty Subramaniam as Saith Badshah/Thiru
- Ruhi Singh as Janani
- Manishaa Shree as Priya Reddy
- Arjunan Nandakumar as Bhaskar
- Rajan Krishnaswamy as Babu
- Sharath Lohitashwa as Pandian
- Atul Kulkarni as Subash, assistant commissioner
- Ramdoss as Mani
- Mayilsamy as Mayil
- Poster Nandakumar as Bhai
- Bava Lakshmanan as Deiva Kuzhanthai
- Chaams as a Car mechanic
- Nikita Thukral as item number "Vella Kuthira"
- Sumann as item number "Thangame"

== Production ==
New director Tej began working on Bongu during the middle of 2015 and stated the road movie would be shot with the backdrops of Dindigal, Madurai, Chennai, and Mumbai. The film was stated to have been based on supercars and would feature several luxury cars. Natty Subramaniam was announced to play the lead role in the film during October 2015, with Raai Laxmi and Pooja Bisht also revealed to be a part of the cast. Raai Laxmi suffered an injury during November 2015 and subsequently had to opt-out of the project, with Ruhi Singh replacing her in the lead role.

== Soundtrack ==
The music composed by Srikanth Deva.

No.	Song	Singers	Lyrics
1	"Ambu Villada"	M. L. R. Karthikeyan, Bizmac, Hemambika	Kabilan
2	"Sollava"	Gowri Lakshmi, Fritz Manuel	Thamarai
3	"Thangame"	Ranina Reddy, Nincy Vincent, Bizmac	Madhan Karky
4	"Vaanam"	Aalap Raju, Timmy, Nincy Vincent	Thamarai
5	"Vella Kuthira"	Chinmayi, Jagadeesh	Kabilan

== Reception ==
Chennai Vision wrote, "Had only the director focused on avoiding unwanted elements and adding more pace to the proceedings, Bongu could have easily emerged yet another Sathuranga Vettai". Baradwaj Rangan of Film Companion called it "A Phenomenally Dull Caper Movie" in his review. The Hindu wrote, "The writing, for the most part, is pedestrian and the actors rarely light up a scene. Bongu is barely watchable." Indian Express wrote, "The film has tried to ride on the wave of Sathuranga Vettai's success, and to those who expect Bongu to be similar, please read the film's title once again". Times of India wrote "To sum up, Bongu is a harmless entertainer with a few engaging moments. A tightly-packed screenplay could have made it a much more interesting watch". Deccan Chronicle wrote "Bongu is entertaining, but the lack of jaw-dropping displays and careful craftsmanship makes it enjoyable only in parts".
