= Saani Kaayidham =

2022 film directed by Arun Matheswaran

- Official release poster
- Directed by: Arun Matheswaran
- Written by: Arun Matheswaran
- Produced by: Sundar Arumugam
- Starring: Keerthy Suresh; Selvaraghavan
- Cinematography: Yamini Yagnamurthy
- Edited by: Nagooran Ramachandran
- Music by: Sam C. S.
- Production company: Screen Scene Media Entertainment
- Distributed by: Amazon Prime Video
- Release date: 6 May 2022
- Running time: 137 minutes
- Country: India
- Language: Tamil

Saani Kaayidham (transl. Muddy Paper) is a 2022 Indian Tamil-language crime action thriller film directed by Arun Matheswaran. The film stars Keerthy Suresh and Selvaraghavan in lead roles. Sundar Arumugam produced the film while the music and cinematography were handled by Sam C. S. and Yamini Yagnamurthy respectively.

Saani Kaayidham was released on Amazon Prime Video on 6 May 2022 and received positive reviews from critics.

== Plot ==
In 1989, Ponni, a hardworking police constable with no higher aspirations, aims to ensure that her daughter Dhanam receives a good education and becomes a responsible person. Maari, Ponni's husband and a mill worker, aspires to break free from rampant caste issues and poverty in their village by getting involved in local elections. This leads to a minor conflict with one of the mill owner's relatives, and Maari soon gets fired. When Maari returns the next day to apologize and get his job back, Perumal, the mill owner, and his relatives, driven by their senseless casteism and misogyny, humiliate him and make derogatory remarks about Ponni.

In retaliation, Maari humiliates Perumal and his relatives. They feel shamed after a lower-caste person retaliates against them, whom they consider an inferior specimen. As a result, Perumal and his relatives burn down Ponni's house while her husband and daughter sleep inside. They sexually assault Ponni after her superior officer Deva leads her to them on false pretenses. However, they leave Ponni alive since she is a policewoman, and her death might lead to legal trouble for them. When Ponni seeks justice for Maari and Dhanam's deaths in court, the culprits use their influence and receive a minor sentence. After planning a scuffle, they leave to hide and escape with advocate Rani's help. Ponni, reeling from the incident, swears revenge on them.

Ponni teams up with her half-brother Sangayya to seek vengeance against the upper-caste landlords. Ponni was not on good terms with Sangayya due to a past conflict between their mothers, and they grew apart. Sangayya reconciles with Ponni because of a similar incident in his past and how he formed a close bond with Dhanam. The duo finds Rani in an abandoned building, and Ponni finishes her. She also learns the men's locations. Ponni and Sangayya torture Anbu and finish him. During this time, Perumal was hunted by his younger brother Giri, who was also in charge of helping the group hide in different areas, due to an inheritance dispute, and lost his life. Perumal's blind son Sudalai, whom the duo knew beforehand and was Dhanam's close friend, survived. Ponni and Sangayya find the man's body.

Sangayya takes Sudalai, despite Ponni's adamant insistence that Sudalai had also assaulted her on that fateful night. Sangayya burns the lodge, where Vasu, one of Perumal's goons, is staying, and kidnaps him. Sangayya ties Vasu inside a van. Ponni pours acid on him and brutally kills him. Ponni uses the van to run over Giri and his henchmen after one of the goons stabs Sangayya in the back, killing several men, but Giri survives and escapes. The duo finds the last remaining targets, Mani and Deva, at a cinema theatre. Sangayya hacks off Mani's hand before decapitating him. Mani's men seriously wound Sangayya after he singlehandedly held them off and successfully hacked Deva to death.

Sangayya insists that Ponni protect Sudalai since Giri will arrive to kill his nephew to eliminate the last remaining heir to the mill and the properties left by his grandfather. Ponni leaves him in the van to bring Sudalai, whom she had instructed to hide nearby. Giri and the reinforcements arrive and chase the vehicle, which Sangayya had anticipated. Sangayya sacrifices himself by blowing up the van after lighting up several gas cylinders, which he had stowed inside, killing the reinforcements as well as Giri, thus leaving Ponni devastated. After taking some time to recover and having her vengeance fulfilled, Ponni leaves with Sudalai. It is later revealed that Sudalai was not involved in the assault and was innocent.

== Cast ==
- Keerthy Suresh as Ponni
- Selvaraghavan as Sangayya, Ponni's half-brother
- Aadukalam Murugadoss as Giri
- Vinoth Munna as Deva
- Asuran J.K.
- R. K. Vijay Murugan as Anbu
- Kanna Ravi as Maari
- Raja Rishi as Giri's brother
- Aravind
- Lizzie Antony as Advocate Rani
- Pavithra
- P. Rudhra
- Akhilesh
- Mahisha Nachiyar
- Chellapandi

== Production ==
Saani Kaayidham is the first film that Selvaraghavan, as an actor, accepted before his first acting credit became Beast (2022). Filming began in late February 2021. It was later suspended due to the second wave of the COVID-19 pandemic in India, but resumed that June and wrapped on 18 August.

== Music ==
Saani Kaayidham

Film score by Sam C. S.
- Released: 3 June 2022
- Recorded: 2021—2022
- Studios: Psalter Record Inn Pvt Ltd,Chennai; Greenvalley studios,Chennai
- Genre: film score
- Length: 27:18
- Label: Think Music
- Producer: Sam C. S.

Sam C. S. chronology
Carbon (2022)	Saani Kaayidham (2022)	Rocketry: The Nambi Effect (2022)
External audio
- Saani Kaayidham - Original Score on YouTube

The music of the film was supposed to be composed by Selvaraghavan's norm collaborator Yuvan Shankar Raja, but he was replaced by Sam CS. All Score Composed & Arranged by Sam C. S.

Saani Kaayidham (Original Background Score)
No.	Title	Length
1.	"He Needs To Die"	1:11
2.	"The Lonely Sheperd"	1:56
3.	"I Need To Burn Her Alive"	1:22
4.	"Clean The Toilet"	1:25
5.	"Dhana Is All I Have"	1:48
6.	"The Ugly Pack"	1:11
7.	"Helpless Shepherd"	1:47
8.	"Sangaiya's Tears"	1:11
9.	"Saani Kaayidham"	1:02
10.	"Ponni On Acid"	1:56
11.	"The Matador Murders"	2:33
12.	"No Where To Go"	1:15
13.	"One Last Dance"	1:32
14.	"Tears Of Blood"	1:36
15.	"Ponni In A Trance"	1:24
16.	"We Will Fight Back"	4:29
Total length:		27:18

== Release ==
The film was released on Amazon Prime Video on 6 May 2022 alongside its dubbed versions in Telugu and Malayalam, with the Telugu version titled Chinni.

== Reception ==
Saani Kaayidham received positive reviews from critics and audience.

M Suganth of The Times of India rated the film 3/5 stars and wrote "It is ultimately the performances of Keerthi Suresh, who is terrific as the revenge-obsessed Ponni and Selvaraghavan, who superbly turns Sangayya into the film's beating heart, that hold the film aloft and prevent it from sinking into a mindless violent movie". Ashameera Aiyappan of Firstpost rated the film 3/5 stars and wrote "Saani Kaayidham is a solid revenge drama that achieves its humble aspirations". Janani K of India Today rated the film 3/5 stars and wrote "Saani Kaayidham is a neat revenge thriller which lacks depth in writing. If only Arun added more punch to the story, the film could have been flawless".

Latha Srinivasan wrote in Moneycontrol that “Saani Kaayidam' rests firmly on the shoulders of Keerthy Suresh and Selvaraghavan, and works to a great extent only because of them.” Haricharan Pudipeddi of Hindustan Times stated "The film pushes Keerthy Suresh out of her comfort zone while Selvaraghavan contributes in not making the film end up as a blood-soaked tale of vengeance". Bharathy Singaravel of The News Minute wrote "Filmmakers need to stop, just simply stop using sexual violence as a cinematic prop. Normally, in Tamil films, a woman’s life is “over” after she has been sexually assaulted. Saani Khaayidham tries to deviate from that, but ends up reinforcing another trope — that a woman, who is otherwise primarily the wife, daughter, or mother, needs to go through something as traumatic as a sexual assault to become “stronger”.

Srivatsan S of The Hindu wrote "Filmmaker Arun Matheswaran’s second instalment in what he calls his ‘revenge trilogy’ is gory and disturbing. Like the director's previous film, it has a few auteur touches here too, and yet, there are a few issues". However, Dinamani gave a mixed review and noted that the work of many people can be seen in the way Saani Kaayidham was created. But what would the film have been if all this work had been accompanied by an interesting, mind-blowing story, emotional and innovative scenes!". ABP Nadu gave 3/5 stars and noted that apart from the shortcoming that all the pages written in Sanikakitham are in blood, Saani Kaayidham is a ‛blood' bond story that travels with relationship and story. Dinamalar gave a mixed review saying it takes courage to see not one but two people who ruined his life take such murderous revenge. Only such people can watch this film. Make sure children don't watch anything at home, and gave 2.5/5 stars.
