= Abhiyum Anuvum =

- Theatrical release poster
- Directed by: B. R. Vijayalakshmi
- Written by: Uday Mahesh
- Produced by: Saregama
- Starring: Tovino Thomas; Piaa Bajpai
- Cinematography: Akilan
- Edited by: Sunil Shree Nair
- Music by: Dharan Kumar
- Production company: Yoodlee Films
- Distributed by: E4 Entertainment
- Release date: 25 May 2018
- Running time: 125 minutes
- Country: India
- Language: Tamil

Abhiyum Anuvum (transl. Abhi and Anu) is a 2018 Indian Tamil-language romantic drama film directed by B. R. Vijayalakshmi, written by Uday Mahesh and starring Tovino Thomas and Piaa Bajpai. The film was produced by Yoodlee Films, a subsidiary production company of Saregama. This film marks the Tamil debut of Tovino Thomas. The film was dubbed in Malayalam as Abhiyude Kadha Anuvinteyum. The film was released on 25 May 2018. It also got its OTT release, 3 years later on 25 July 2021 through Amazon Prime and Neestream.

== Plot ==
Abhi and Anu lead diametrically different lives, worlds apart from each other. Abhi is the quintessential boy next door, with a regular job and a lifestyle that borders on the mundane. He is very close to and dependent on his mother. On the other hand, Anu is an organic farmer in Ooty — a lively girl passionate about social issues, unafraid to challenge social norms and stigma. They meet, are instantly attracted to each other, and marry on a whim. Anu's pregnancy marks the beginning of a new phase in their lives. However, everything unravels when their families meet, and a shocking disclosure, brought about by a strange twist of fate, is revealed. Caught between societal expectations and his love's needs, Abhi faces a life-altering decision.

== Cast ==
- Tovino Thomas as Abhimanyu (Abhi)
- Piaa Bajpai as Anu
- Samyukta Hornad as Dhivya (Dhivi)
- Prabhu as Prabhu
- Suhasini as Revathy
- Rohini as Meena, Anu's mother
- Udhayabhanu Maheswaran as Abhi's father
- Dheepa Ramanujam as Abhi's mother
- Kalairani as Kamatchi
- Manobala as Abhi's Boss
- Sangeetha Sai as Swathi
- Bigg Boss Julie as Bar dancer
- Kavithalayaa Krishnan as Taxi driver
- Nellai Siva as Traffic police officer

== Soundtrack ==
The soundtrack was composed by Dharan Kumar, and lyrics were written by Madhan Karky.

Abhiyum Anuvum

Soundtrack album by Dharan Kumar
- Released: 5 March 2018
- Genre: Feature film soundtrack
- Language: Tamil
- Label: Saregama
- Producer: Dharan Kumar

Dharan Kumar chronology
Kadhal Kasakuthaiya (2017)	Abhiyum Anuvum (2018)	Maanik (2018)

Tamil

- "Saregama" — Haricharan, Shashaa Tirupati
- "Engada Pona" — Benny Dayal, Nikhita Gandhi
- "Engada Pona" (male) - Benny Dayal
- "Engada Pona" (female) - Nikhita Gandhi
- "Theme Music (Love)"
- "Theme Music (Happy)"

Malayalam (dubbed)

- "Ninteyomal Mizhigalo" — Haricharan, Shashaa Tirupati
- "Endhino Kanne" — Haricharan, Shweta Mohan
- "Endhino Kanne" (male) - Haricharan
- "Endhino Kanne" (female) - Shweta Mohan
- "Theme Music (Love)"
- "Theme Music (Happy)"

== Release ==
Abhiyum Anuvum was released in theatres on 5 March 2018.

== Critical reception ==
M. Suganth of The Times of India rated the film 2.5/5 stars and wrote, "The subject that is explored in Abiyum Anuvum is a daring one, with a knot that is complex to untangle. The moral and social dilemmas that the protagonists of the film face need sensitive handling, but that is where the film disappoints." Anupama Subramanian of Deccan Chronicle wrote, "Though AA deals with a bold theme, the writing lacks the kind of sensitivity and finesse such a subject warrants."

Litty Simon of Onmanorama wrote, "Abhiyum Anuvum starts off breezy and dips later with dramatic sequences. The time, when the couple faces reality, there's a big confusion and the movie goes haywire." Ashameera Aiyappan of The Indian Express wrote, "the film, despite thriving in the grey area, refuses to get truly dirty. We are made to believe so for the longest of times until an end-film card whitewashes the movie out of its grey shades."

Vishal Menon of The Hindu wrote, "Honestly, there’s so much that could have been done with such a great plot, especially when they’ve decided to take a progressive stand while dealing with a taboo topic." Gautaman Bhaskaran of News18 wrote, "What a pity that a subject as interesting and as important as test-tube fertilisation woven into a simple romance has had to slip and slide."

Kirubhakar Purushothaman of India Today wrote, "The problem with Abhiyum Anuvum is that the film has no drama around the interesting plotline. The writing is very underwhelming." A critic from Dinamalar rated the film 2.25/5.
