= Piyush Jha =

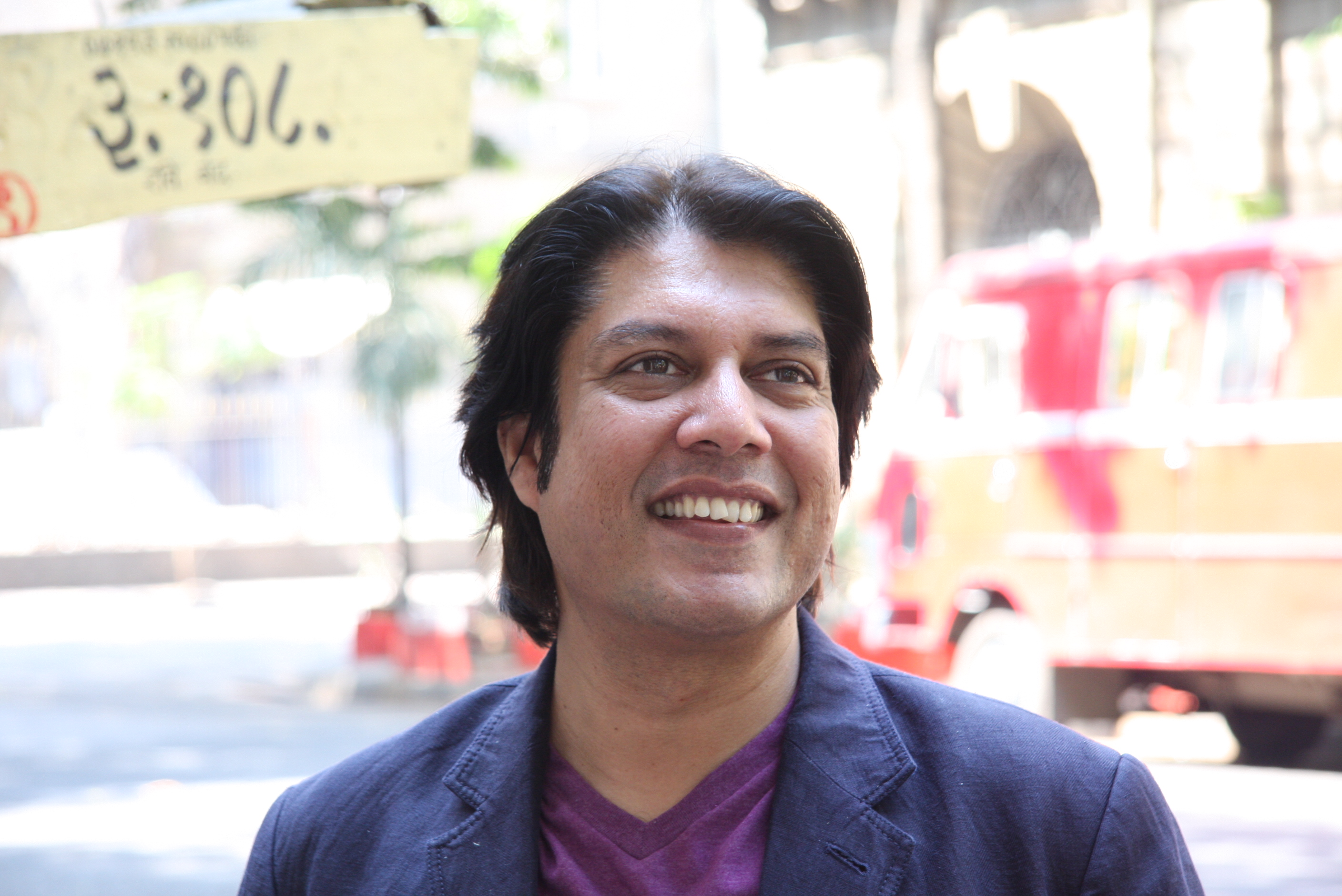
- Born: Jhansi, Uttar Pradesh, India
- Occupations: Film director, Author, Screenwriter, Series Creator
- Years active: 1999–present
- Spouse: Priyanka Sinha Jha

Piyush Jha is a film director, screenwriter, author and series creator from India.

== Early life ==
Piyush Jha was born in Jhansi, Uttar Pradesh. He did all his schooling in Mumbai, graduating with a bachelor's degree in psychology at the University of Mumbai and following it up with an MBA from K. J. Somaiya Institute of Management Studies and Research.

== Career ==
=== Advertising ===
Jha began his career in advertising as an account executive at Grey Global Group- India. He later worked in DDB Mudra in strategic account management with clients such as Procter & Gamble and Godrej Group. He started getting interested in the creative aspect of advertising and began with directing in-house ad films for client companies and soon moved to directing corporate films as well.

In 1998, he took this interest further to start his own ad film production company, where he made ads for Indian Oil, Hindustan Lever, and UB Group among many others.

=== Feature films ===
In 2000, the Government of India's NFDC produced his first feature film, Chalo America, about three Indian college boys obsessed with the American dream, and how they concoct various schemes to find a way to the US. It was a selection at the Indian Panorama Section at the International Film Festival of India (IFFI), and was shown at international film festivals such as those in Shanghai, Cairo, San Diego, Dhaka, and Atlanta.

After continuing to make ad films, Jha returned to the big screen in 2004, with the first Indian film in the "mockumentary" genre, King of Bollywood, starring Om Puri and British supermodel Sophie Dahl. It tells the story of an aging Bollywood movie star.

In 2009, after his extensive travels around India and the world, Jha decided to pick up on another serious issue: terrorism in Kashmir. Sikandar is a story about a young boy who finds a gun on his way to school, and how that affects his life, and the life of the little village he lives in. Sikandar was selected in the international film festivals in Dubai, IFFLA in LA, Edmonton in Canada, MIACC in New York, and Stuttgart in Germany, among others. The film was highly acclaimed by critics, including those of the mainstream popular media (Nikhat Kazmi, renowned film critic of the Times of India, India's largest selling English daily, gave it a 3.5 star rating).

=== Personal life ===
Jha is married to news-media personality Priyanka Sinha Jha.

=== Writing ===
Piyush Jha has been called the Dashiell Hammett of Mumbai. Jha is the author of bestselling crime and thriller novels. His debut novel, Mumbaistan, is a collection of three crime fiction thriller novellas which explore the underbelly of Mumbai. The books Compass Box Killer and Anti-Social Network from Jha's Inspector Virkar- Crime Thriller Series revolve around a Mumbai-based policeman, Inspector Virkar, and his cat and mouse chase with murderers and serial killers. Jha's standalone crime fiction book Raakshas: India's No. 1 Serial Killer is about a female police commissioner Maithili Prasad's encounter with an anonymous serial killer, who murders women by decapitating them. Jha's fifth book, Girls of Mumbaistan comprise 3 hi-octane thriller novellas featuring female and transgender protagonists and their adventures in Mumbai.

Apart from crime fiction, Jha has also written a satirical e-novellas on the Juggernaut Books digital app, called The Great Indian Bowel Movement and The Urinationalist. These e-shorts talk about issues of open defecation, public urination and inadequate sanitation in India.

Jha is also a columnist. He writes a regular column in the Hindustan Times and a guest column in The Tribune on books and book-related happenings.

Piyush Jha adapted his third book "Anti- Social Network", from his Inspector Virkar Crime-Thriller series of books into a web series Chakravyuh – An Inspector Virkar Crime Thriller (2021). The show was produced by Applause Entertainment and MayaVid for MXPlayer platform. Chakravyuh was critically quite successful and rose to the no.1 spot on the charts in its first week itself.

== Filmography and works ==
=== Writer and director ===
- Chalo America (1999)
- King of Bollywood (2004)
- Sikandar (2009)

=== TV/OTT/web shows ===
- Chakravyuh – An Inspector Virkar Crime Thriller (2021)

=== Audio-fiction/podcast shows ===
- Bombay Strangler Ke Khauffnaak Tapes (2021)

== Bibliography ==
=== Novels ===
- Mumbaistan (2012)
- Compass Box Killer: An Inspector Vikrar Crime Thriller (2013)
- Anti-Social Network: An Inspector Vikrar Crime Thriller (2014)
- Raakshas: India's No. 1 Serial Killer (2016)
- Girls Of Mumbaistan (2020)

=== Short stories ===
- "The Great Indian Bowel Movement" (2017)
- "The Urinationalist" (2019)

== Festival official selections ==
- Chalo America: Indian Panorama Section at the International Film Festival of India, 1999; and the international film festivals of Shanghai, Cairo, San Diego, Dhaka, and Atlanta, amongst others.
- King of Bollywood: international film festivals in Bradford, UK (Bite the Mango Festival); Tel Aviv, Israel; New York City; Toronto, Canada; Melbourne, Australia, and others.
- Sikandar: international film festivals, Dubai, IFFLA in LA, Edmonton in Canada, MIACC in New York, and Stuttgart in Germany, among others.

== Award nominations ==
- Sikandar was nominated for the Ramnath Goenka Award for 'Movies That Make a Difference' at the 2010 Star Screen Awards.
- Parzaan Dastur was nominated for Best Child Artiste for his eponymous role in Sikandar at the 2010 Star Screen Awards.
- Parzaan Dastur was nominated for BREAKTHROUGH PERFORMANCE – MALE at The Max Stardust Awards 2010.
- Mumbaistan was long-listed for the Tata Lit Live Best First Book Award-2012.
