= Arun Matheswaran =

Indian film director, screenwriter (born 1982)

- Born: 25 February 1982 (age 44)
- Occupations: Film director; screenwriter
- Years active: 2013–present
- Spouse: Ranjini

Arun Matheswaran is an Indian film director and screenwriter who predominantly works in the Tamil film industry.

== Career ==
Before his debut as a director, Arun worked as an assistant director to Thiagarajan Kumararaja, and was the dialogue writer of Irudhi Suttru (2016). Arun made his directorial debut in with Rocky (2021) which received widespread acclaim from critics. His second film, Saani Kaayidham (2022), a crime drama featuring Keerthy Suresh and Selvaraghavan, premiered on Amazon Prime Video.

Arun's third directorial Captain Miller (2024), an action-adventure film set in the 1930s, has Dhanush playing the lead and is part of a multi-film franchise that includes a prequel and sequel. After Captain Miller, Arun was confirmed to be collaborating with Dhanush again for an untitled project, produced by Wunderbar Films, and a biopic of composer Ilaiyaraaja, co-writing the screenplay with Kamal Haasan. The status of the latter project became unknown after Arun started directing a separate film, titled DC, but it was later confirmed that he was still attached to the Ilaiyaraaja biopic, and that pre-production had been completed.

== Filmmaking style ==
Arun's films revolve around the themes of revenge and contain "harsh realism" which he claims helps differentiate them from other Tamil films based on revenge. He has named Jim Jarmusch, Seijun Suzuki and Akira Kurosawa as some of the filmmakers who influence his films.

== Personal life ==
Arun Matheswaran was born on 25 February 1982. He is married to Ranjini.

== Filmography ==
Key
†	Denotes films that have not yet been released

- All films in Tamil unless otherwise noted.

=== As a film director ===
List of directorial credits
Year	Title	Notes	Ref.
2021	Rocky		
2022	Saani Kaayidham		
2024	Captain Miller		
2026	DC		

=== Other roles ===
List of other credits
Year	Title	Role	Notes
2013	Settai	Actor	
2016	Irudhi Suttru	Writer	Dialogues only
