= Rocky (2021 film) =

2021 Indian Tamil-language neo-noir action film

- Theatrical release poster
- Directed by: Arun Matheswaran
- Written by: Arun Matheswaran
- Produced by: C. R. Manoj Kumar
- Starring: Vasanth Ravi; Bharathiraja; Raveena Ravi
- Cinematography: Shreyaas Krishna
- Edited by: Nagooran Ramachandran
- Music by: Darbuka Siva
- Production company: RA Studios
- Distributed by: Rowdy Pictures
- Release date: 23 December 2021
- Running time: 121 minutes
- Country: India
- Language: Tamil

Rocky is a 2021 Indian Tamil-language neo-noir action thriller film directed by Arun Matheswaran in his directorial debut, while it was produced by C. R. Manoj Kumar under RA Studios and distributed by Rowdy Pictures. It stars Vasanth Ravi, Bharathiraja and Raveena Ravi in the lead roles. The music was composed by Darbuka Siva, while the cinematography and editing were handled by Shreyaas Krishna and Nagooran Ramachandran.

Rocky was released on 23 December 2021 on Christmas weekend to widespread critical acclaim and became a box office success.

== Plot ==
Narrative structure
- Prologue: "Aadhi Muran Pudhir" ("The God Paradox")
- Chapter 1: "Un Amma Unna Yen Peththa Theriyuma?" ("Do You Know Why Your Mom Gave Birth To You?")
- Chapter 2: "Ketta Kadavul Nalla Saathan" ("Evil God, Virtuous Devil")
- Chapter 3: "Naatukku Pogalam" ("Let us go back to our homeland")
- Chapter 4: "Oru Kazhugu 100 Moonji" ("1 Eagle; 100 Faces")
- Epilogue: "The Seedless Fruit"

Rocky, an assassin who gets released from prison after finishing his sentence, learns that his younger sister Amutha has left the city. He stays at his friend Mahalingam's house and enquires a gangster named Saamy about Amutha, but to no avail. Mahalingam learns from Nadarajan that Amutha is in Sellur and informs this to Rocky. It is revealed that Rocky lived with his mother Malli and Amutha in Madras. He worked with a drug smuggler named Manimaran. Malli objected to Rocky's decision to work with Manimaran, as her husband had worked with Manimaran and subsequently lost his life.

Rocky heads to Sellur, where he meets a pregnant Amutha, who berates him for his mistakes but eventually reconciles with him. Suddenly, Manimaran's henchman and an inspector arrive, and they knock out Rocky and kill Amutha. Rocky awakens alongside Nadarajan, who learns about the incident. They reach the inspector's hideout and brutally kill him and the henchmen. Rocky heads to Saamy's lodge, where he tortures Saamy's assistant, who reveals Manimaran's location in an abandoned construction site in Minjur. They reach the site only to fight with his goons, which results in Nadarajan being killed. Rocky kills most of the goons, including Saamy.

Rocky reaches and confronts Manimaran, only to learn that they also killed Amutha's husband, and Amutha's daughter is the lone survivor. She is held at knifepoint by Manimaran's right-hand man Thanraj. Rocky escapes along with Amutha's daughter after knocking out both Manimaran and Thanraj. They leave for Malli's village in Tamil Eelam. It is revealed that Rocky killed Manimaran's son because he was jealous of Rocky taking over the smuggling consignments. Manimaran berated his son, due to which the latter killed Malli. During the journey, Rocky learns that his niece's name is also Malli. During the journey, a bond grows between them.

Thanraj kills Mahalingam and traces Rocky and Malli in Dhanushkodi, where he tries to kill them, but Rocky kills Thanraj and the remaining henchmen. While reaching Dhanushkodi, Rocky faces Manimaran and the entire criminal fraternity of Madras. Rocky mows down and kills all of them using a M134 Minigun, which was actually a part of the consignment secretly kept by him. Accepting his defeat, Manimaran commits suicide by slitting his throat. With no one else to trouble him, Rocky and Malli leave on a boat to Malli's village, where Malli asks Rocky if she can tell him a story about an eagle.

== Cast ==
- Vasanth Ravi as Rocky
- Bharathiraja as Manimaran
- Raveena Ravi as Amudha
- Rohini as Malli
- Poo Ram as Mahalingam
- Ravi Venkataraman as Saamy
- Ashraf Mallisery as Thanraj
- Rishikanth as Manimaran's son
- Jayakumar as Nadarajan
- Anisha as Malli
- Nagooran Ramachandran as Dates Seller

== Production ==
=== Development ===
In April 2018, Vasanth Ravi, during an exclusive interview with ETimes, revealed that he signed his next project after his debut film Taramani (2017). He further revealed that it was written and directed by debutant Arun Matheswaran, who worked as an associate of Thiagarajan Kumararaja. On 26 September that year, the official title Rocky was announced by the production house. Initially, Mysskin was chosen to play the main antagonist, but opted out for unknown reasons.

== Music ==
The soundtrack and score was composed by Darbuka Siva and the album featured three songs. The audio rights were acquired by Lahari Music.

Track listing
No.	Title	Lyrics	Singer(s)	Length
1.	"Aalilalilo"	Madhan Karky	Chinmayi Sripada	04:44
2.	"Naan Sinam Ariven"	Kaber Vasuki	Anthony Daasan	04:51
3.	"Vanma Padhaiyil"	Kaber Vasuki	James Thakara, Kaber Vasuki	04:52

== Reception ==
Ashameera Aiyappan of Firstpost gave 4/5 stars and wrote "With Rocky, Director Arun Matheswaran and DOP Shreyas Krishnaa manipulate the space on-screen with great finesse to communicate the emotional psyche of the characters." M. Suganth of The Times of India gave 4/5 stars and describe the film as "gloriously violent, superbly shot and deeply sentimental film." Manoj Kumar. R of The Indian Express gave 3.5/5 stars and wrote "None before Arun Matheswaran had dared to graphically depict violence in such a way. The film's setup innately compromises the separation between good versus evil. It is a demon versus demon and we have to root for the lesser evil."

Thinkal Menon of OTTplay gave 3.5/5 stars and wrote "Rocky is an undiluted action film which is nothing short of a feast for fans of gangster flicks. It stands out for its fine technical aspects and performances from the lead cast." Janani. K of India Today gave 3/5 stars and wrote "Rocky is not a plain revenge drama, it is layered and carefully structured. The film is a leaf out of the John Wick universe, but remains rooted in Tamil Nadu."

Baradwaj Rangan of Film Companion wrote "Rocky is best seen as a showreel of Arun Matheswaran and has a fantastic eye for composition, where he also uses the big screen beautifully." Praveen Sudevan of The Hindu wrote "Revenge dramas have existed for generations in Tamil cinema. There are scores of good and bad ones, but Rocky will probably be among the best, because it is spectacularly bloody and poetic at the same time." Haricharan Pudipeddi of Hindustan Times wrote "Arun Matheswaran’s Rocky is a no-nonsense, extremely ultraviolent revenge drama. It is unarguably the most violent film in Tamil cinema's history."
