= Tamil Guardian =

London-based newspaper

- Categories: Politics, culture, Sri Lanka, Tamil
- Founded: 1998
- Website: Official website

Tamil Guardian is an online, English language news site based in London. Published internationally for over 20 years, the media site was originally published as a print broadsheet newspaper in English from the UK and Canada.

The publication supports the creation of Tamil Eelam as an independent state.

It has run op-eds from several political figures including from the Tamil National Alliance, the leader of the Labour Party Ed Miliband and the British Prime minister David Cameron. The Tamil Guardian has also carried out interviews with celebrities such as Academy Award and Grammy Award nominated artist M.I.A., several Tamil politicians and activists and senior US and British officials. Writers and editors at the Tamil Guardian have provided commentary to several news outlets around the world on Sri Lankan and Tamil political and cultural affairs.

== History ==
The Tamil Guardian was first published in London.

In 2011, the print edition of the newspaper ceased and the media outlet moved entirely online, publishing news on its website, as well as its various social media platforms.

== Political views ==
The Tamil Guardian continues to support the creation of Tamil Eelam as an independent state after the end of the Sri Lankan civil war, perhaps through democracy.

One Sri Lankan journalist accused the website of a being a news front of the Liberation Tigers of Tamil Eelam (LTTE), in an article published in 2000. No evidence of any link to the LTTE has since been provided. The publication commemorates the death of LTTE cadres and advocates for Sri Lankan military deoccupation.

== Threats and intimidation ==
Throughout its history the Tamil Guardian correspondents have faced threats from Sri Lankan security forces. In January 2020, the paper's Batticaloa-based correspondent was harassed by the Sri Lankan security forces and arrested after reporting on alleged corruption against a local government official.

In April 2019, another correspondent was summoned for questioning by Mullaitivu police, after the Sri Lankan navy filed a complaint against him for reporting on a disappearances rally in the district.

In October 2018, a Jaffna-based correspondent was the target of harassment and intimidation by security forces, ever since he was summoned for questioning at TID headquarters in Colombo. Reporters Without Borders (RSF) called on the Sri Lankan authorities to end the harassment stating it was on "entirely spurious grounds".
