= Naalai =

- Poster
- Directed by: Udhayabhanu Maheswaran
- Written by: Udhayabhanu Maheswaran
- Produced by: Nallamuthu
- Starring: Richard Rishi; Natty Subramaniam; Madhumitha; Nassar
- Cinematography: G. Ramesh
- Edited by: Krishnamoorthy–Sivanandan
- Music by: Karthik Raja
- Production company: Grey Films
- Release date: 16 June 2006
- Country: India
- Language: Tamil

Naalai (transl. Tomorrow) is a 2006 Indian Tamil-language gangster action film written and directed by Udhayabhanu Maheswaran and produced by Nallamuthu. The film stars Richard Rishi, Natty Subramaniam, Madhumitha, and Nassar. The music was composed by Karthik Raja, and the film released on 16 June 2006.

== Plot ==
The film starts with Justin getting released from jail while his friend Natty is waiting for him. A writer who witnesses this decides to write a biography on them. Justin and Natty are friends since childhood. They first met during the death of their respective parents and both work as henchmen to Nair. They are his loyal servants and are prepared to lay their lives for him. However, a sequence of events results in Nair developing mistrust and hatred towards the two. He employs another youth, Adi, in their place and plans to bump them off. Eventually, Justin ends up in prison, and Nattu loses his leg thanks to Nair's plans.

After three years (when Justin completes his jail term), Justin, along with Natty, decides to stay away from violence and lead a peaceful life. Charu, a girl-next-door, falls in love with Justin, and both decide to marry. Meanwhile, a reformed Nair seeks an apology to both Natty and Justin before his death. However, when things go smooth in their lives, a previous enmity leaves Nair's henchmen making an attempt on Justin's life, which eventually claims Charu's life. In the climax, Justin stabs Aditya, while Justin himself gets stabbed and dies. The film ends with Natty carrying Justin and both jumping into the sea and dying.

== Cast ==
- Richard Rishi as Justin
- Natty Subramaniam as Natty
- Madhumitha as Charu
- Nassar as Nair
- Aditya Srivastava as Adi
- Bala Singh as Kothandam
- Mahanadhi Shankar
- Sembi as Bose
- Kadhal Dhandapani as Thanikai
- Ilavarasu
- Suja Varunee
- Nirosha
- Manobala
- Bose Venkat as a cop
- Edwinkirubynathan
- Sivakumar Palakrishnan
- Krishnamoorthy
- Muthukaalai
- Nanditha Jennifer (special appearance in the song "Idi Mayalogam")

== Production ==
Natty Subramaniam, who worked as Madras Bashai tutor for the film, made his lead debut after the actor originally supposed to play the role backed out.

== Soundtrack ==
The songs were composed by Karthik Raja and lyrics were written by Na. Muthukumar.

Track listing
No.	Title	Singer(s)	Length
1.	"Kattabomman"	Tippu
2.	"Naalai Indha Kaalam"	Karthik
3.	"Arai Adi Thoorathil"	Rita, Ranjith, Tippu
4.	"Idi Mayalogam"	Malgudi Subha, Tippu, Ranjith
5.	"Oru Mattram"	Karthik

== Critical reception ==
Sify wrote that "Naalai is not a classic gangster movie, still the team has to be encouraged. It’s just ok and one of the better gangster movies we have seen in recent times". Rediff.com wrote, "The absence of an original story line and a weak screenplay takes the sheen out of the film. On the whole, it is a film with a lot of gloss and stale content". The Hindu said that "Rarely do you get to witness a short, succinctly told narrative on screen". Lajjavathi of Kalki wrote the director Udhayabhanu Maheswaran, who has come to tell the friendship of two friends that tomorrow is a question mark in the life of gangsters, has left the momentum and pressure in the screenplay. That's why in the climax, even though they sacrificed every person alive, it was not so heartbreaking.

Cinesouth wrote "This is also another gangster film but director Udayabanu Maheswaran’s screenplay and direction sets it apart from the regular genre". Malini Mannath of Chennai Online wrote "There is not much variation or excitement by way of script or any novelty by way of presentation. The characters too lack consistency and intensity. It's like the director's initial enthusiasm in etching them waned as the narration proceeded, the characters appearing lacklustre towards the later part".
