= Most Eligible Bachelor (soundtrack) =

- Soundtrack album cover for Most Eligible Bachelor

Soundtrack album by Gopi Sundar
- Released: 12 October 2021
- Recorded: 2020–2021
- Studio: Sunsa Digital Work Station, Kochi & Hyderabad; Audio Garage Studio, Mumbai; Studio One, Hyderabad; New Edge Studios, Mumbai
- Genre: Feature film soundtrack
- Length: 21:25
- Language: Telugu
- Label: Aditya Music
- Producer: Gopi Sundar

Gopi Sundar chronology
Tuck Jagadish (2021)	Most Eligible Bachelor (2021)	Anubhavinchu Raja (2021)
External audio
- Audio Jukebox on YouTube

Singles from Most Eligible Bachelor
- 1. "Manasa Manasa" Released: 1 March 2020; 2. "Guche Gulabi" Released: 13 February 2021; 3. "Ye Zindagi" Released: 5 April 2021; 4. "Leharaayi" Released: 15 September 2021; 5. "Chitti Adugu" Released: 11 October 2021

Most Eligible Bachelor is the soundtrack album composed by Gopi Sundar, to the 2021 Indian Telugu-language romantic comedy film of the same name, directed by Bhaskar, starring Akhil Akkineni and Pooja Hegde. The film was produced by Bunny Vas and Vasu Varma on GA2 Pictures. The film marked Gopi Sundar's second collaboration with Bhaskar after Bangalore Naatkal (2016).

The film featured five tracks with lyrics written by Surendra Krishna, Ananta Sriram, Sri Mani, Ramajogayya Sastry, and Sirivennela Seetharama Sastry. The album was released by Aditya Music on 12 October 2021, on eve of Hegde's birthday.

The tracks "Manasa Manasa", "Guche Gulabi", "Ye Zindagi" and "Leharaayi" served as the lead singles and are romantic songs. The music received positive reception from critics and audience. Sundar received Best Music Director– Telugu nomination at 10th South Indian International Movie Awards and 67th Filmfare Awards South.

== Background ==
The Malayalam music composer Gopi Sundar was hired to compose songs and score for the film. He was earlier collaborated with Bhaskar for the 2016 Tamil film Bangalore Naatkal. Later, Surendra Krishna, Ananta Sriram, Sri Mani, Ramajogayya Sastry, and Sirivennela Seetharama Sastry were signed to write the lyrics for the songs. The music rights were bagged by Aditya Music.

Sundar revealed that the film's producer, Bunny Vas served as his musical assistant for the film. He said that Vas sits with him and guide him the right path what kind of feel he wants. Sundar composed 30-40 tunes for the film's soundtrack and finally selected the songs for film.

== Composition ==
The first single, titled "Manasa Manasa" was sung by Sid Sriram and written by Surendra Krishna. Sriram was selected by Sundar after former performing "Inkem Inkem Inkem Kaavaale" in Geetha Govindam (2018). Akkineni said that this one [song] makes me smile and radiates positivity.

The second single titled "Guche Gulabi" was sung by Armaan Malik. The song was written by Ananta Sriram and Sri Mani. The song marks the fourth collaboration of Armaan with Akkineni after Hello (2017), "Yemainado" and "Koppamga Koppamga" both in Mr. Majnu (2010) and the third collaboration with Hegde after "Anaganaganaga" in Aravinda Sametha Veera Raghava (2018) and "Butta Bomma" in Ala Vaikunthapurramuloo (2020).

For film's third single "Ye Zindagi" makers selected debutant singer Haniya Nafisa. This is for the first time in Telugu Film Industry a singer is taken and introducing from Instagram. The song was also sung by Gopi Sundar himself and was written by Ramajogayya Sastry. The fourth single "Leharaayi" was sung by Sid Sriram and written by Sri Mani. The fifth song "Chitti Adugu" is written by Sirivennela Seetharama Sastry and sung by Zia Ul Haq.

== Marketing and release ==
The film's first single was announced on 1 March 2020 on social media platforms. On 2 March 2020, the film's first single titled "Manasa Manasa" was unveiled. On 10 March, makers announced to create versions of song and get a chance to meet Akhil Akkineni and Pooja Hegde on sets of the film.

The second single's title "Guche Gulabi" was announced on 9 February 2021, with a promo video featuring Akkineni holding a rose. Later, the song's teaser was released on 11 February. A glimpse of the second single, featuring Armaan Malik's voiceover, was released in all social media platforms on 12 February. On 13 February 2021, the second song "Guche Gulabi" was released coinciding Valentine's Day. The song's success celebration was held at Hyderabad on 15 February 2021.

The third single's title as "Ye Zindagi" was announced on 2 April 2021. On 3 April, makers announced that the song was sung by debutant singer Nafisa Haniya. On 5 April 2021, third song "Ye Zindagi" was released.

The fourth single was announced on 11 September. The song's promo was released on 13 September 2021. A promo featuring Gopi Sundar was unveiled on 14 September. On 15 September 2021, the fourth song "Leharaayi", written by Sri Mani and sung by Sid Sriram was released. On 11 October 2021, four days before the film's release, the fifth single "Chitti Adugu" was released. The album was released on 12 October 2021, on eve of Hegde's birthday.

== Track listing ==
Most Eligible Bachelor (Original Motion Picture Soundtrack)
No.	Title	Lyrics	Singer(s)	Length
1.	"Manasa Manasa"	Surendra Krishna	Sid Sriram	4:13
2.	"Guche Gulabi"	Ananta Sriram, Sri Mani	Armaan Malik	4:42
3.	"Ye Zindagi"	Ramajogayya Sastry	Haniya Nafisa	4:05
4.	"Leharaayi"	Sri Mani	Sid Sriram	4:05
5.	"Chitti Adugu"	Sirivennela Seetharama Sastry	Zia Ul Haq	4:15
Total length:				21:25

Original Non-film Track List

All music is composed by Gopi Sundar.

No.	Title	Lyrics	Singer	Length
1.	"Leharaayi"	Sri Mani	Nutana Mohan	1:51

== Reception ==
The film's music received positive reviews from critics. Reviewing the soundtrack, The Hans India wrote "The music is good too. A couple of songs that became a big hit were placed nicely. The background score helped the film elevate the emotion well too." A critic of Sify wrote "Gopi Sundar’s music is the main highlight. ‘Leharaayi’, and ‘Guche Gulabi’ stand out." 123 Telugu wrote "The songs are yet another added advantage to the film and have also been shot quite well." Jeevi of Idlebrain wrote "Two melodies used in the first half (Leharayi & Guche Gulabi) are beautiful." Srivathsan Nadadhur of OTTPlay commented "this is composer Gopi Sunder's best album in recent times." Balakrishna Ganeshan of The News Minute wrote "Gopi Sundar has delivered good music for the film."

== Impact ==
The fourth single "Ye Zindagi"'s title was later used as a song name in Rowdy Boys (2022).

== Album credits ==
=== Original soundtrack ===
Credits adapted from Aditya Music

==== Songwriter(s) ====
- Gopi Sundar (Composer, Arranger)

==== Performer(s) ====
- Composition, production, musical arrangements, recording, mixing, mastering – Gopi Sundar
- Lyrics – Surendra Krishna, Ananta Sriram, Sri Mani, Ramajogayya Sastry, Sirivennela Seetharama Sastry
- Singers – Sid Sriram, Armaan Malik, Haniya Nafisa, Gopi Sundar, Zia Ul Haq.

== Awards and nominations ==
Award	Date of ceremony (Note: Date is linked to the article about the awards held that year, wherever possible.)	Category	Recipient(s)	Result	Ref.
South Indian International Movie Awards	10 September 2022	Best Music Director– Telugu	Gopi Sundar	Nominated	
South Indian International Movie Awards	10 September 2022	Best Lyricist – Telugu	Sri Mani ("Leharaayi")	Nominated	
Filmfare Awards South	9 October 2022	Filmfare Award for Best Music Director – Telugu	Gopi Sundar	Nominated	
Filmfare Awards South	9 October 2022	Filmfare Award for Best Male Playback Singer – Telugu	Sid Sriram ("Manasa Manasa")	Nominated	
