= PVP Cinema =

Indian film production company

- Industry: Entertainment
- Headquarters: Vijayawada, Andhra Pradesh, India
- Key people: Prasad Vara Potluri
- Products: Films
- Owner: Prasad Vara Potluri
- Website: PVP Cinema

PVP Cinema is an Indian film production company established by Prasad V Potluri.

== Film production ==
No	Year	Film	Language	Actors	Director	Notes	Ref.
1	2011	Rajapattai	Tamil	Vikram, Deeksha Seth	Suseenthiran		
2	2012	Naan Ee	Tamil	Nani, Samantha Ruth Prabhu, Sudeep	S. S. Rajamouli	Tamil version of Eega	
3	2013	Balupu	Telugu	Ravi Teja, Shruti Haasan, Anjali, Prakash Raj	Gopichand Malineni		
4	2013	Vishwaroopam	Tamil; Hindi	Kamal Haasan, Pooja Kumar, Andrea Jeremiah	Kamal Haasan	Co production along with Raaj Kamal Films International	
5	2013	Irandaam Ulagam	Tamil	Arya, Anushka Shetty	Selvaraghavan		
6	2014	Vallavanukku Pullum Aayudham	Tamil	Santhanam, Ashna Zaveri	Srinath		
7	2015	Vasuvum Saravananum Onna Padichavanga	Tamil	Arya, Santhanam, Tamannaah	Rajesh	Co production along with The Show People	
8	2015	Size Zero	Telugu; Tamil	Anushka Shetty, Arya, Sonal Chauhan	Prakash Kovelamudi		
9	2016	Bangalore Naatkal	Tamil	Arya, Sri Divya, Rana, Parvathy, Bobby Simha	Bhaskar		
10	2016	Kshanam	Telugu	Adivi Sesh, Adah Sharma, Anasuya Bharadwaj	Ravikanth Perepu	Co Production along with Matinee Entertainment	
11	2016	Oopiri	Telugu; Tamil	Karthi, Tamannaah, Akkineni Nagarjuna	Vamsi Paidipally		
12	2016	Brahmotsavam	Telugu	Mahesh Babu, Kajal Aggarwal, Samantha Ruth Prabhu, Pranitha Subhash	Srikanth Addala	Co Production along with G. Mahesh Babu Entertainment Pvt. Ltd	
13	2017	The Ghazi Attack	Telugu; Hindi	Rana Daggubati, Taapsee	Sankalp Reddy	Co Production along with Matinee Entertainment	
14	2017	Graghanam	Tamil	Kreshna, Nandhini	Elan		
15	2017	Raju Gari Gadhi - 2	Telugu	Akkineni Nagarjuna, Samantha Ruth Prabhu	Omkar		
16	2019	Maharshi	Telugu	Mahesh Babu, Pooja Hegde	Vamsi Paidipally	Co production with Sri Venkateswara Creations and Vyjayanthi Movies	
17	2019	Evaru	Telugu	Adivi Sesh, Regina Cassandra	Venkat Ramji		
18	2022	Ori Devuda	Telugu	Vishwak Sen, Mithila Palkar, Asha Bhat	Ashwath Marimuthu	Co production with Sri Venkateswara Creations	

== Distribution ==
No	Year	Film	Language	Actors	Director	Notes
1	2016	Kaashmora	Tamil	Karthi, Nayantara, Sri Divya	Gokul	Only Telugu version
2	2023	Vaarasudu	Tamil	Vijay, Rashmika Mandanna	Vamshi Paidipally	Only Telugu version
3	2023	Sir	Telugu; Tamil	Dhanush, Samyuktha Menon	Venky Atluri	Only Telugu version
