= Oopiri (soundtrack) =

2015 soundtrack album by Gopi Sundar

Soundtrack album by Gopi Sundar
- Released: 14 February 2016
- Recorded: 2015–2016
- Genre: Feature film soundtrack
- Length: 27:36
- Language: Telugu
- Label: Junglee Music
- Producer: Gopi Sundar

Gopi Sundar chronology
Bangalore Naatkal (2016)	Oopiri (2016)	Kali (2016)

The soundtrack to the 2016 bilingual comedy-drama film Oopiri / Thozha is composed by Gopi Sundar with lyrics written by Ramajogayya Sastry and Sirivennela Sitarama Sastry in Telugu, and Madhan Karky in Tamil. The film, directed by Vamshi Paidipally and produced by PVP Cinema, starring Karthi and Nagarjuna. The soundtrack to the Telugu version was released on 14 February 2016, followed by the Tamil version which released a week later. Both the albums were marketed by Junglee Music.

== Development ==
Gopi Sundar was signed as the film's composer in February 2015, marking his maiden collaboration with Director Vamshi Paidipally and Hero Karthi.This is the first time Gopi Sundar Composing the Songs in Tamil and Telugu Launguages. Karthi and Paidipally wanted Thozha's songs to suit the Tamil audience's sensibilities. Hence, all the lyrics in Oopiri except "Door Number Okati" had different meanings in Thozha, according to Karky where "the translations were very literal, the lyrics in both the albums weren't desperately trying to sound similar, even the letters with which, the stanzas started or ended." Sirivennela Sitarama Sastry collaborated with Ramajogayya for the album, with the latter writing "Ayyo Ayyo". Anirudh Ravichander performed the title track Karthi's "Thozha" for the Tamil version, jointly with Haricharan; while Haricharan was the sole singer for the Telugu version "Podham".

== Release ==
The soundtrack rights for both Oopiri and Thozha were acquired by Junglee Music. Oopiri's album was unveiled on 14 February 2016 (Valentine's Day) at the Hitex Convention Centre in Hyderabad, while the soundtrack to Thozha was released on 21 February 2016, at St. Bede's School in Chennai with the presence of the cast and crew among other celebrities.

== Track listing ==
=== Telugu ===
No.	Title	Lyrics	Singer(s)	Length
1.	"Baby Aagodhu"	Sirivennela Sitarama Sastry	Shankar Mahadevan	2:39
2.	"Oka Life"	Sirivennela Sitarama Sastry	Karthik	4:46
3.	"Ayyo Ayyo"	Ramajogayya Sastry	Ranjith, Suchitra	3:48
4.	"Nevvemicchavo"	Sirivennela Sitarama Sastry	Vijay Prakash	2:07
5.	"Podham"	Sirivennela Sitarama Sastry	Haricharan	4:45
6.	"Door Number Okati"	Sirivennela Sitarama Sastry	Geetha Madhuri	4:05
7.	"Eppudu"	Sirivennela Sitarama Sastry	Karthik	4:47
Total length:				27:36

=== Tamil ===
All lyrics are written by Madhan Karky.

No.	Title	Singer(s)	Length
1.	"Baby Odadhe"	Shankar Mahadevan	2:39
2.	"Pudidha"	Karthik	4:46
3.	"Eiffel Mele"	Ranjith, Suchitra	3:48
4.	"Enadhuyire"	Vijay Prakash	2:07
5.	"Thozha"	Anirudh Ravichander, Haricharan	4:45
6.	"Door Number One"	Geetha Madhuri	4:05
7.	"Nagarum"	Karthik	4:47
Total length:			27:36

== Reception ==
Critic based at The Times of India gave Oopiri's soundtrack four stars, calling it a "winner on all counts" and Sunder is "increasingly becoming a force to be reckon with in [Telugu cinema]". IndiaGlitz gave three stars to Oopiri's soundtrack with Sunder's "refreshing approach" to the album does justice to Sirivennela's "imaginative lyrical world". 123Telugu-based critic wrote "every song has a purpose and the beautiful lyrics only enhance them". Reviewing for both Oopiri and Thozha's soundtrack, Ramesh S. Kannan of Moviecrow described the songs being "lively casual" and "flows well without major glitches" giving three stars to both albums.

Karthik Srinivasan, writing for The Hindu, praised Sunder's usage of solo violin pieces and chorus hooks in Thozha's "Pudhidhaa" ("Oka Life" in Oopiri). Srinivasan's review for the soundtrack in Milliblog is described as "punchy" and "fluffy". Siddharth K of Sify noted that the soundtrack of Thozha has influences of Malayalam film soundtracks in the slow-paced songs despite being designed keeping the Telugu and Tamil sensibilities in mind. He found the songs "Baby Odathey" ("Baby Aagodhu" in Telugu), "Nagarum" ("Eppudu" in Telugu), and "Eiffel Mele" ("Ayyo Ayyo" in Telugu) likeable and gave the soundtrack three stars. Behindwoods also gave Thozha's soundtrack three stars calling it as "lively, fun and refreshing".

== Accolades ==
Date of ceremony	Award	Category	Recipient(s) and nominee(s)	Result	Ref.
28—29 March 2017	IIFA Utsavam	Best Music Director – Telugu	Gopi Sundar	Nominated	
28—29 March 2017	IIFA Utsavam	Best Lyricist – Telugu	Sirivennela Seetharama Sastry ("Podham")	Nominated	
28—29 March 2017	IIFA Utsavam	Best Male Playback Singer – Telugu	Haricharan ("Podham")	Nominated	
28—29 March 2017	IIFA Utsavam	Best Female Playback Singer – Telugu	Suchitra ("Ayyo Ayyo")	Nominated	
17 June 2017	Filmfare Awards South	Best Lyricist – Telugu	Sirivennela Seetharama Sastry ("Oka Life")	Nominated	
