= Irandam Ulagam =

2013 Indian film by Selvaraghavan

- Theatrical release poster
- Directed by: Selvaraghavan
- Written by: Selvaraghavan
- Produced by: Prasad V. Potluri
- Starring: Arya; Anushka
- Cinematography: Ramji
- Edited by: Kola Bhaskar
- Music by: Songs: Harris Jayaraj; Anirudh Ravichander; Score: Anirudh Ravichander
- Production company: PVP Cinema
- Release date: 22 November 2013
- Running time: 160 minutes
- Country: India
- Language: Tamil

Irandam Ulagam (transl. Second world) is a 2013 Indian Tamil-language romantic fantasy film written and directed by Selvaraghavan. Starring Arya and Anushka Shetty, the film's soundtrack was composed by Harris Jayaraj, with a score composed by Anirudh Ravichander and cinematography handled by Ramji. Filming began in December 2011 and was complete by April 2013, with post-production works complete by October. the film was released worldwide on 22 November 2013.

== Plot ==
Irandam Ulagam is about two stories which unfold concurrently in two different planets – the Earth and an unnamed exoplanet. On Earth a naive medical student Ramya who has a crush on an academic mathematician Madhu Balakrishnan, asks him out. He initially refuses her proposal for marriage as his father has a disability, needing his full attention and care. Later, Madhu gradually reciprocates Ramya's love seeing her caring nature and proposes marriage. But she reluctantly rejects his proposal as her family has already arranged her marriage. While on a trip to Goa, Madhu wins Ramya's heart while her fiancé abruptly cancels the marriage citing dowry as the reason. She suddenly dies in a freak accident, and this is followed by Madhu's paralysed father's death too. Depressed by the sudden twin tragedies, Madhu becomes a vagabond in Goa. He sees an apparition of his dead father that tells him death is an illusion. Later, at a local tourist spot, he follows an empty car to a hilltop and tries to commit suicide. He gets injured and faints while trying to drive the car.

The story moves parallel in the alternate world in a relatively primitive kingdom which protects the immortal Amma. The son of a noble military commander, Maravan, falls in love with a working class orphan, Varna. Maravan, though fearless, does not take an interest in martial arts and roams around the kingdom drinking with his friends. Varna, on the other hand, is interested in a military career though she picks and packs wild mushrooms to eke out a living. She also has the desire to protect Amma from the enemies of the kingdom. While gatecrashing a military admissions exam for Amma's protection, the tyrant king condemns Varna to his harem. Maravan pleads with the king to release Varna, and the king, in return, challenges Maravan to get hold of a lion's skin within three days. Maravan, though inexperienced, fights with the lion that has never been conquered until then and gets Varna released. At the behest of the king, Varna is forced to marry Maravan, which goes against her free will. So, she tries to commit suicide after assaulting the king. But Amma saves her, and the riled king exiles her to the forest. Depressed, Maravan tries to commit suicide in vain. Taunted by new military recruits, Maravan climbs a sacred mountain called Swamimalai.

Meanwhile, with the special powers of Amma, an inter-planetary portal opens briefly between Maravan in Swamimalai and Madhu in Goa. Maravan rescues the fainted Madhu from the car and takes him to Amma for treatment. People of the kingdom celebrate Madhu mistake him for an angel. Enemies lay siege to the kingdom and try to kidnap Amma, but intoxicated Maravan fights them off with the help of Varna, who returns from the forest. When Madhu looks at Varna (who looks like Ramya), flowers begin to bloom in the kingdom for the first time. But the timid people force Varna back into the forests. Later Maravan's bravery is rewarded by his father and king, who admits him into military service. Maravan, with new-found confidence, goes into the forest to meet Varna with food and blankets. But she rejects him again. Madhu, too goes into the forest to meet Varna. This time, Varna accepts his friendship. Marvan gets jealous of Madhu. A stormy night forces Varna to eventually return to the kingdom from the forest. The enemies of the kingdom capture Amma while the irate king sends Maravan for execution for illegally housing Varna. Maravan is captured by the enemy troops while abducting Amma. Madhu and Varna set out through the forest to find Maravan and Amma. Varna eventually realises that she had fallen in love with her husband Maravan after hearing about Ramya. Maravan bravely wipes out the entire army of the enemy and escapes with Amma on a boat. But Madhu is drowned in combat. Amma stops Varna and Maravan from saving him. Then an inter-planetary portal opens briefly again, and Madhu lands in another unnamed exoplanet where he finally meets his soulmate Ramya look-alike again. He earnestly asks her if she is single. Finally, he realises that it is his true destiny.

== Cast ==
- Arya as Maravan/Madhu Balakrishnan
- Anushka as Ramya/Varna/Anushka (Voice dubbed by Chinmayi)
- Tina Dalakishvili as Amma
- Venkatesh Harinathan as Venky
- Ashok Kumar as Madhu's father
- Padu Raman as Chief Doctor
- Hema Rajkumar as Ramya's colleague
- Selva
- Rohit Kalia as Ramya's fiancé (special appearance in "Kanimozhiyae" song)
- Selvaraghavan (voice role) as houseowner

== Production ==
No one has really attempted a mystical film. There is a lot of Sufism and a Zen feel to the film. I have made a romantic film that uses these elements in the background. There is a reality in mysticism

— Selvaraghavan

After deciding to shelve a project titled Idhu Maalai Nerathu Mayakkam featuring Dhanush and Andrea Jeremiah, Selvaraghavan began a separate film with the same actors titled Maravan. The film was later retitled Irandam Ulagam. Eventually, Dhanush and Andrea were replaced by Arya and Anushka Shetty. Principal photography began in December 2011 in Ramoji Film City, Hyderabad. The team later shot a few scenes in Rio de Janeiro and the forests of Brazil.

Arya worked out to build a huge frame and six-pack abs to fit the muscular lead role. Filming also took place in Georgia for almost three months under extreme conditions. The final filming schedule took place in Srisailam in Nallamala Hills of Kurnool district in November 2012. Filming was completed by April 2013. In October 2013, all post-production work including computer-generated imagery work lasting several weeks was finally over and the content was locked.

== Music ==
Harris Jayaraj was hired to compose the soundtrack of Irandam Ulagam. All the songs in the soundtrack were written by Vairamuthu. G. V. Prakash Kumar was initially announced as the music composer when Dhanush and Andrea were the lead pair, but left due to "money and time issues", and Yuvan Shankar Raja took over. However, in April 2011, it was announced that Prakash Kumar was reinstated after Yuvan moved out, only to be replaced by Harris that September. Harris said that the songs would feature breezy romantic and situation-based tracks as per the film's central theme.

The soundtrack of Irandam Ulagam was released at Sathyam Cinemas in Chennai on 4 August 2013, and the soundtrack of the Telugu-dubbed version Varnaa on 27 October 2013.

All lyrics are written by Vairamuthu.

Track listing
No.	Title	Singer(s)	Length
1.	"En Kaadhal Theeye"	S. P. Balasubrahmanyam	05:03
2.	"Vinnathaandi Anbe"	Vijay Prakash	06:53
3.	"Pazhangkalla"	Dhanush	04:22
4.	"Kanimozhiye"	Karthik, Megha	05:50
5.	"Raakkozhi Raakhozhi"	Hariharan, Palakkad Sreeram	05:29
6.	"Mannavane En Mannavane"	Gopal Rao, Shakthisree Gopalan	05:28
7.	"Irandam Ulagam Theme"	Madras Chorale Group	02:23

Harris had to opt out of composing the background score since he was overloaded with work from other projects, necessitating a new composer for the background. Anirudh Ravichander was eventually hired and said, "I have worked on three songs as part of the background score, which we recorded in Hungary. These songs, with a duration of about 2 mins each, will appear as montages in the movie." The songs were released as additional soundtracks on 14 October 2013. The Irandam Ulagam team clarified that there was no friction between Harris and Selvaraghavan as some media reported and that the decision was made positively on a mutual agreement.

No.	Title	Singer(s)	Length
1.	"Penne Naa Enna Solla"	Anirudh Ravichander	02:14
2.	"Iravinil Oruvanai"	Chinmayi, Anirudh Ravichander	02:03
3.	"Un Kaadhal Ingu Unmaiya"	Anirudh Ravichander	02:44

== Marketing ==
A 70-feet cut-out of Anushka was erected at Shilpa Kala Vedika in Madhapur, Hyderabad on the eve of the audio launch.

== Release ==
Irandam Ulagam was initially announced to release in Diwali 2013, but was later postponed to 22 November, along with Varnaa. The film was given a U certificate by the Censor Board with no cuts. Arya distributed the film in Singapore and Malaysia through his The Show People.

=== Critical reception ===
Baradwaj Rangan wrote for The Hindu, "With just a handful of movies, Selvaraghavan has announced himself a major filmmaker, and it falls on us to look at his latest venture, Irandaam Ulagam, as the (worthy) next instalment in a thematically connected oeuvre as well as a (problematic) standalone film. It's a love story without a shred of genuine passion". The Times of India gave the film 2 out of 5 stars and wrote, "The disjointed way in which the scenes play out in this world at times makes one wonder if we are seeing the film version of a feverish dream Selvaraghavan might have had". Sify wrote, "Irandam Ulagam is not everybody's cup of tea, but the film is made with a lot of passion and sincerity. However, like all his previous films, this one too is ahead of its time". Rediff gave 3 out of 5 and wrote, "Irandam Ulagam is a visually stunning fantasy story set in an imaginary world that describes a love that transcends the human understanding of time and space. (It) is an ambitious project by a director who always strives to give a different and unique experience to his audience".

IANS gave 2 out of 5 stars and wrote, "Selva complicates a simple love story in his attempt to merge romance and fantasy genres, only to give the audience an unbearable experience. The film is ruined by an abstract and complicated screenplay". Bangalore Mirror wrote, "Selva needs to be commended for having chosen such a challenging theme, though he should have taken a little more care to distinguish between the behavioral traits and life styles of the inhabitants of the two worlds". Deccan Herald gave 2 out of 5 and wrote, "Irandam Ulagam, twin worlds, both of which disappoint given that the narrative makes the audience totally disoriented and disinterested in its dour, dull drama that unfolds in spectacular fashion". The New Indian Express wrote, "Brilliantly conceived, the film, however, falls short on execution".

=== Box office ===
Irandam Ulagam opened at number one at the Chennai box office despite Sify stating that it carried "mixed reports". In its second week, however, despite being at number two, the film was considered a "flop" by Sify.

== See also ==
- Planetary romance
