= Puthagam =

2013 Indian film by Vijay Adhiraj

- Theatrical release poster
- Directed by: Vijay Adhiraj
- Written by: Vijay Adhiraj; Guhan Sreenivasan (dialogues)
- Story by: Vijay Adhiraj
- Produced by: S. Manjula
- Starring: Sathya; Rakul Preet Singh
- Cinematography: Laxman Kumar
- Edited by: Kevin
- Music by: James Vasanthan
- Production company: Ram Pictures Private Limited
- Release date: 14 January 2013
- Country: India
- Language: Tamil

Puthagam (transl. Book) is a 2013 Indian Tamil-language comedy thriller film directed by television personality Vijay Adhiraj. The film stars Sathya, Rakul Preet Singh, alongside an ensemble supporting cast consisting of Jagapati Babu, Sanjay Bharathi, Vignesh Vijaykumar, Aishwarya Rajesh, Suresh, and Rachana Maurya, among others.

The film was shot in Sony F 65. Laxman Kumar of was the cinematographer, and the music was scored by James Vasanthan. The movie also has GK as its art director. The film was released on 14 January 2013.

== Plot ==
Mohan lives in Chennai. His two roommates, Anthony and Radhakrishnan are from less fortunate backgrounds. Despite their differences, they are best friends. Radhakrishnan is in love with his boss Thara. One day, Mohan borrows a book from the Chennai Literary Society library for his television reporter girlfriend Divya. He then finds a note in the book that leads him to a cemetery. All the graves painted blue have thousands of bank notes instead of dead bodies. Mohan shares this news with his roommates and they decide to share the cash to solve their families' financial problems.

At the same time, Divya is covering the high-profile case of a powerful but corrupt political leader Imaiyappan. He has lost all the black money that he has been hiding away from the authorities for years by giving it to a close friend for safekeeping. Now, the friend has died and Imaiyappan does not know where all his black money is. He is forced to seek the help of JB and Dolly, two highly skilled former intelligence officers.

After much difficulty, JB and Dolly manage to track down the family of Imaiyappan's late friend. The friend had hidden the location of the black money in a book in a Chennai library before he was run over by a truck. He had sent the book's registry number via a text message to his family so that they could take it and move to London. JB and Dolly then learn that the last person to check out the supposed book from the library was Mohan.

Mohan and everyone he loves then ends up in harm's way when both JB and Imaiyappan come after him. In the end, JB decides to let Mohan and his loved ones life when he discovers that Mohan only took a small portion of the black money to help his roommates with their finances, while he donated the rest of them to various charities across the city anonymously. Imaiyappan then has a heart attack when he learns that both his reputation and black money are gone forever.

In the end, Mohan is shown going on a vacation with Divya and their friends. Unknown to them, JB and Dolly are following them. It turns out that Mohan had only donated part of the money to charities, and he had transferred the rest to a Swiss bank and turned them all into legal money. JB is enraged as he has been tricked by a boy as young as Mohan and sets out to trap him.

== Cast ==
- Sathya as Mohan
- Rakul Preet Singh as Divya
- Sanjay Bharathi as Radhakrishnan
- Vignesh Vijayakumar as Anthony
- Rachana Maurya as Dolly
- Aishwarya Rajesh as Thara
- Suresh as Imaiyappan
- Jagapati Babu as JB
- Vicky Krish as Mohan's friend
- Crazy Mohan as Varadachari
- Manobala as Kalyanasundaram aka Kallis
- Santhana Bharathi as Thennai Kabali
- O. A. K. Sundar as Anand
- Thalaivasal Vijay as Vasanth
- Delhi Ganesh as Bank officer
- Fathima Babu as Veni
- Uma as Divya's mother
- Besant Ravi as Goon
- Crane Manohar
- Vichu Viswanath as Guru
- Bhanuprakash as Ajay Thinmaiha
- Sindhu Shyam as Nancy
- M. J. Shriram as Newsreader
- Nellai Siva as Traffic police officer
- RJ Balaji as Narrator (voiceover)

== Production ==
Puthagam is the film debut of Sathya after his intended debut Kadhal 2 Kalyanam failed to release. Filming started in April. For one sequence, Rakul Preet Singh was required to drive a bike and almost crashed due to her then limited knowledge of driving bikes.

== Soundtrack ==
Puthagam

Soundtrack album by James Vasanthan
- Released: 12 November 2012
- Genre: Film soundtrack
- Label: Gemini

James Vasanthan chronology
Paagan (2012)	Puthagam (2012)	Dalam (2012)

The soundtrack is composed by James Vasanthan. The soundtrack was not promoted well on radio stations which led to James accusing them of discrimination.

- "Kondadathaan" - Tippu, Rahul, Sunandan
- "Mella Poopupukudhe" - Belly Raj, Deepa Miriam
- "Italica" - Mathangi
- "Say That You Love Me" - Suchitra, Prasad
- "Money Is So Funny" - Gerard Johnson, Maya

=== Critical reception ===
Karthik of Milliblog wrote, "James’s music is erratic, as usual, but the highlights impress".

== Release and reception ==
The film was released on 14 January 2013, during Pongal. The Times of India wrote, "Puthagam doesn't turn out to the fast-paced read it had the potential to be". Sify wrote, "Vijay Adiraj intention was to make a commercially viable comedy thriller, but it has not worked out. Commercial entertainers should not have long drawn out scenes and it should be crisp and a bit more racy".
