= Vasuvum Saravananum Onna Padichavanga =

2015 Indian film by M. Rajesh

- Theatrical release poster
- Directed by: M. Rajesh
- Written by: M. Rajesh
- Produced by: Arya; Prasad V. Potluri
- Starring: Arya; Tamannaah Bhatia; Santhanam; Muktha
- Cinematography: Nirav Shah
- Edited by: Vivek Harshan
- Music by: D. Imman
- Production companies: The Show People; PVP Cinema
- Release date: 14 August 2015
- Running time: 158 minutes
- Country: India
- Language: Tamil

Vasuvum Saravananum Onna Padichavanga (transl. Vasu and Saravanan studied together) also known by the initialism VSOP, is a 2015 Indian Tamil-language romantic comedy film written and directed by M. Rajesh. The film stars Arya, Tamannaah Bhatia, Santhanam and Muktha. It revolves around the friendship between Vasu and Saravanan, and the situations they find themselves in due to their romantic entanglements.

Arya produced the film through his studio The Show People, associating with Prasad V. Potluri's PVP Cinema. The soundtrack was composed by D. Imman. Nirav Shah and Vivek Harshan handled cinematography and editing, respectively. The film, shot between November 2014 and June 2015, was released on 14 August 2015.

== Plot ==
Vaasu and Saravanan are best friends. When Vaasu's marriage was going to be fixed with Seema, Saravanan wanted to first interview Seema to see if she is a suitable bride for Vaasu. A series of comedic incidents happen during the interview and during the marriage of Vasu and Seema, which angers and embarrasses Seema. To make matters worse, Saravanan plays a prank during Vaasu's marriage night, which makes Vaasu end up in hospital with a broken disc.

An angry Seema wants Vaasu to break his friendship with Saravanan and declares that nothing between them until then. Vaasu does not want to break his friendship with Saravanan directly as to not hurt Saravanan's feelings. He gets the help of his friend Gautham, who tells him to get Saravanan married. Vaasu helps Saravanan get a girlfriend in the hopes that the girlfriend will be a reason to end the friendship. Saravanan and Vaasu go to happymarriage.com, where Saravanan falls for Aishwarya Balakrishnan, who works there.

Aishwarya, who initially dislikes Saravanan, eventually agrees to his love. As Saravanan had interviewed Seema before she married Vaasu, Vaasu interviews Aishwarya at a café. A fight breaks out between Aishwarya and Vaasu, forcing Saravanan to choose between the two. Saravanan chooses Aishwarya and breaks his friendship with Vaasu. Vaasu later exits the café dramatically but secretly enjoys outside by dancing.

Vaasu reunites with Seema, but minutes later, Saravanan appears, revealing that he was only lying in front of Aishwarya that he had broken their friendship. Seema feels cheated as Vaasu had promised Seema upon their future child that their friendship was cut. Seema is furious and leaves to her mother's place. Vaasu gets irritated and tells Saravanan to leave and never show his face again.

That night, Gautham tells Vaasu that Saravanan had broken up with Aishwarya for him. Vaasu immediately rushes to see him, and they reunite. They decide to start a club of men who have been cheated by their wives or girlfriends. This turns out to be successful. They are also supported by Akila Chechi, the leader of Akila Indian Men Security Club. Then, Assistant Commissioner Vetrivel arrives and tells the trio to join up with their wives by lying that they have their friendship cut.

== Cast ==
- Arya as Saravanan
- Tamannaah Bhatia as Aishwarya Balakrishnan
- Santhanam as Vaasu
- Muktha as Seema
- Karunakaran as Gautham
- Vidyullekha Raman as Kausalya
- Sayaji Shinde as Ashok
- Pattimandram Raja as Balakrishnan
- Siddharth Vipin as Ashwin
- Vennira Aadai Moorthy as Moorthy
- Swaminathan as Point to Point Padmanabhan
- Shakeela as Akila Cheichi
- Jyothi Lakshmi as Lakshmi
- Renuka as Kamatchi
- Surekha as Ambujam
- Supergood Subramani as the museum security guard
- Brindha Das as Sudha
- Heera as Pooja
- Ratheesh Nambiar as Rahul Varma
- C. Ranganathan as Doctor

Cameo appearance

- Mahanadi Shankar as Police Officer
- Vishal as ACP Vetrivel
- Lakshmi Menon as Lakshmi, Vetrivel's wife (voiceover only)

== Production ==
In November 2013, Arya agreed to finance and star in the lead role of director M. Rajesh's next venture, with Santhanam also brought in to the project to play a supporting role. Nayanthara was also reported to be a part of the film and an official press statement was released during the same month, stating that filming would begin in late 2014 after Arya had finished his ongoing commitments. In March 2014, Rajesh revealed that it would be a sequel to their successful comedy film Boss Engira Bhaskaran (2010) and that Tamannaah Bhatia would also play a new character in the franchise. Nayanthara later opted out of the film, and Rajesh began re-working the script. In October 2014, Rajesh then announced that the film would not be a sequel to his previous film and that it would be a new script.

A launch event was held on 21 November 2014 and the team began production on the same day, with scenes involving Arya and Bhatia shot. The film's title was revealed as Vasuvum Saravananum Onna Padichavanga later that month, along with the initialism "VSOP". Rajesh denied that the initialism was chosen after Very Special Old Pale, calling it coincidence. Filming wrapped in June 2015.

== Music ==
D. Imman composed the soundtrack.

Title	Singer(s)	Lyrics	Length
"Adada Onnum Solladha"	Benny Dayal, Shakthisree Gopalan	Na. Muthukumar	04:26
"Lucka Maattikkichi"	Dholak Gana Jagan, Senthildass Velayutham, Palaniammal	Rokesh	04:40
"Naa Romba Busy"	Neeti Mohan, Santhosh Hariharan, Sharanya Gopinath	Na. Muthukumar	04:36
"Sona Sona"	Armaan Malik, Varun Parandhaman, Maria Roe Vincent	Na. Muthukumar	04:30
"Vasuvum Saravananum"	Sooraj Santhosh, Kailash Kher	Na. Muthukumar	04:31

== Release and reception ==
Vasuvum Saravananum Onna Padichavanga was released on 14 August 2015. S. Saraswathi of Rediff.com gave the film 2 stars out of 5 and wrote that "the offending script make Rajesh's Vaasuvum Saravananum Onna Padichavanga a silly and tasteless film that does not deserve your time." The Times of India gave the film 2.5 stars out of 5 and wrote, "What Rajesh has done is [..] taking bits and pieces from his previous successful films and giving us a new film that feels familiar. The only difference is that he manages to succeed... to an extent". Kirubhakar Purushothaman of India Today rated 1 star and criticised that "Rajesh's two-and-half-hour script has nothing, but female bashing, making fun of plus-sized women, double-meaning-ed, innuendo-ed dialogues and absurd one-liners, which are sweet-coated as humour". Baradwaj Rangan wrote in The Hindu, "With such a premise, and with these overgrown adolescents in every frame, why isn't the film a series of Dumb and Dumber-style physical-comedy sketches? Why the flabby romantic passages, with mood-killing songs during which everyone in the theatre returns to whatever game they were playing on their phones?"
