= Telugucinema.com =

Entertainment website on Telugu cinema

- Website type: Film news and reviews
- Available in: English, Telugu
- Founder: Prasad V. Potluri
- Editor: Jalapathy Gudelli
- Industry: Internet services
- Website: Telugucinema.com
- Commercial: Yes
- Registration: Free/subscription
- Launched: 1997
- Current status: Active

Telugucinema.com is an entertainment website focused on the Telugu film industry. Founded in 1997 by Prasad V. Potluri in Pittsburgh, United States, it is recognised as the first website exclusively dedicated to Telugu cinema. The site is known for its long-form articles on classic films and film personalities, as well as its extensive archive of interviews with industry figures.

The site offers content such as film news, box office reports, trailers, interviews, and photo galleries. It is regarded as one of the most popular platforms covering the Telugu film industry. Jalapathy Gudelli currently serves as the publisher, editor, and chief critic of the website.

== History ==
Telugucinema.com is a website dedicated to covering the Telugu film industry. It was established in 1997 by Prasad V. Potluri in Pittsburgh, United States. In 2006, the site faced warnings against publishing film reviews, as distributors claimed that reviews posted after preview shows were impacting box office collections. Despite this, the website now has an extensive archive of film reviews.

== Features ==
Telugucinema.com is particularly known for its long-form articles on notable film personalities, retrospectives of classic films, and significant events in the Telugu film industry. The site also offers a wide range of content, including film news, reviews, box office collections, trailers, interviews, movie schedules, and photo galleries.

== Team ==
The current publisher, editor, and chief critic of the website is Jalapathy Gudelli, a seasoned journalist and film critic with over 20 years of experience. Other contributors include Sri Atluri and M. Patnaik.

== Reception ==
In April 2006, Y. Sunita Chowdhary of The Hindu described Telugucinema.com as "a big hit" with a loyal visitor base. Anjali Gera Roy, a professor at IIT Kharagpur, in her 2012 book The Magic of Bollywood: At Home and Abroad, identified the site as one of the most successful websites dedicated to Indian cinema in a specific language. Swarnavel Eswaran Pillai, an associate professor at Michigan State University, in his 2015 book Madras Studios: Narrative, Genre, and Ideology in Tamil Cinema, praised the site for creating a space for serious cinema discussion.
