= NSM Public School, Vijayawada =

Location
- Vijayawada, Andhra Pradesh; India; 16°29′29″N 80°39′34″E

Information
- Motto: "Towards a Better World"
- Established: 1973; 53 years ago
- Founder: St. Montfort
- School district: NTR District
- Principal: Rev. Bro. Rayappa Reddy
- Gender: Coeducational
- Campus size: 6.8 acres
- Houses: Bose; Nehru; Patel; Tagore
- Website: nsmpublicschoolvijayawada.org

NSM Public School also known as N. St. Mathew's Public School is a private school in Vijayawada, Andhra Pradesh, India. It is affiliated with the Central Board of Secondary Education.

The school is maintained by the society of Montfort Brothers of St. Gabriel, founded by the 17th-century French priest and Catholic saint, Saint Louis de Montfort.

== History ==
The foundation stone for the institution was set on March 16, 1975, by the Minister for Primary Education at that time, Sri Mandali Venkata Krishna Rao. The inaugural Class X participated in the AISSE exams in 1979, and the school caters to students from KG to the tenth grade.

The school organised a Golden Jubilee run from Indira Gandhi municipal stadium on 16 July 2023.

== Notable alumni ==
- Prasad V. Potluri
- Ravi Teja
