= Kadamban =

- Poster
- Directed by: N. Ragavan
- Written by: N. Ragavan
- Produced by: R. B. Choudary
- Starring: Arya; Catherine Tresa
- Cinematography: S. R. Sathish Kumar
- Edited by: Deva
- Music by: Yuvan Shankar Raja
- Production company: Super Good Films
- Distributed by: The Show People; August Cinema
- Release date: 14 April 2017
- Running time: 139 minutes
- Country: India
- Language: Tamil

Kadamban (Lord Murugan) is a 2017 Indian Tamil-language action adventure drama film written and directed by N. Ragavan. It stars Arya and Catherine Tresa in the lead roles. The music was composed by Yuvan Shankar Raja, while the art direction and action choreography were handled by A. R. Mohan and Dhilip Subbarayan.

Kadamban was released on 14 April 2017. The movie was dubbed and released in Telugu as Gajendrudu. The Hindi film rights were purchased by RK Duggal Studios for a record price. The Hindi trailer was launched on 6 May 2017, and the Hindi dubbed version was released under the same title by RKD studios.

== Plot ==
Kadamban is a native of an isolated tribe in the Kadamba forest in Tamil Nadu. He lives a happy life as the protector of the forest. Mahendran is a powerful business magnate running a cement factory with his brothers, who attempt to get the tribe out of the forest as he learns that it is known for its immense amount of limestone and plans to extract the metals illegally. Kadamban and his clan refuse, and a battle ensues. Mahendran orchestrates shootouts and the cops in the forest, which lead to the deaths of many tribe members. With some of the villagers, Kadamban manages to finish off Mahendran and his brothers, thus saving the forest and avenging injustice.

== Cast ==
- Arya as Kadamban
- Catherine Tresa as Radhi
- Deepraj Rana as Mahendran
- Super Subbarayan as Moopa
- Y. Gee. Mahendra
- Aadukalam Murugadoss
- Madhusudhan Rao as Basil Raju
- Rajasimman as Radhi's brother
- Madhuvanti Arun
- Usha Elizabeth as Radhi's mother
- Ethiraj as Ranger Karuna
- Amruth Kalam as Muthu
- Kadhal Saravanan as Mahendran's assistant
- Sai Baba
- Elizabeth
- Madurai Saroja
- Jayakumar
- Dr. Sabu Issac as Doctor

== Production ==
In January 2015, Ragava and Vikram Prabhu announced that they would work on an action adventure film together. Ilaiyaraaja was signed on to compose the film's music. The film was reported to be titled Thanni Kaattu Raja. It was postponed.

In December 2015, Ragava announced that he would make the action adventure film with Arya in the lead role and that it would be set in the backdrop of a jungle. Catherine Tresa was signed on as the heroine, while Yuvan Shankar Raja was announced as the film's music composer. For his role in the film, Arya underwent a very rigorous training, he took charge of his lifestyle, underwent a complete makeover and sported a striking muscular physique. The film began shooting in March 2016 in the forests of Kodaikanal and the terrain was rough and challenging. The team realised this shoot was going to be like no other, they took on every challenge the jungle had to throw at them; even as simple as mobile network coverage was hard to find, the team requested local operators to put up four communications towers. In May 2016, the film's actual title was revealed to be Kadamban. For the shooting of the climax scene, 70 elephants were used. Catherine Tresa says that, Kadamban is a saga with a social message to love forest and the simple ways of nature; this is indeed an eye opener for the betterment of the country.

== Soundtrack ==
Kadamban

Soundtrack album by Yuvan Shankar Raja
- Released: 24 March 2017
- Recorded: 2017
- Genre: Soundtrack
- Length: 18:49
- Language: Tamil
- Label: TrendMusic
- Producer: Yuvan Shankar Raja

Yuvan Shankar Raja chronology
Sathriyan (2017)	Kadamban (2017)	Anbanavan Asaradhavan Adangadhavan (2017)

The soundtrack was composed by Yuvan Shankar Raja and released on TrendMusic.

All tracks are written by Yugabharathi.

Track-List
No.	Title	Singer(s)	Length
1.	"Otha Paarvayil"	Yuvan Shankar Raja, Srimathumitha	3:53
2.	"Uchimalai Azhagu"	Mukesh Mohamed	3:26
3.	"Saama Kodaangi"	Anitha Karthikeyan, Velmurugan, Jayamoorthy	3:22
4.	"Aagaadha Kaalam"	Ananthu	4:11
5.	"Ilarattham Soodera"	M. L. R. Karthikeyan	3:57
Total length:			18:49

Telugu Track-List (Gajendrudu)
No.	Title	Lyrics	Singer(s)	Length
1.	"Donga Chaatuga"	Rakendu Mouli	Vedala Hemachandra, Pranavi	3:53
2.	"Paccha Pacchani"	Bhuvana Chandra	Sri Krishna	3:26
3.	"Kondaa Konallo"	Vennelakanti	Rakendu Mouli, Pranavi	3:22
4.	"Thallanti Adave"	Vennelakanti	Vedala Hemachandra	4:11
5.	"Vanamera Nee Thodu"	Rakendu Mouli	M. L. R. Karthikeyan	3:57
Total length:				18:49

== Release ==
Kadamban was released on 14 April 2017.

== Reception ==
Kadamban became a success at the box office. Though the film wasn't a good profitable deal, but the makers enjoyed some revenue.

=== Critical response ===
Baradwaj Rangan of Film Companion wrote "Avatar meets Lagaan in the Ragava-directed Kadamban (Protector)...the result is long and a bit of a mishmash, but not entirely unwatchable." Behindwoods rated the Music 2.5 /5 and noted it as "A passable adventure by Yuvan for Kadamban that is just about competent !"
