= Most Eligible Bachelor =

2021 film by Bhaskar

- Theatrical release poster
- Directed by: Bhaskar
- Written by: Bhaskar
- Produced by: Bunny Vas; Vasu Varma
- Starring: Akhil Akkineni; Pooja Hegde
- Cinematography: Pradeesh M. Varma
- Edited by: Marthand K. Venkatesh
- Music by: Gopi Sundar
- Production company: GA2 Pictures
- Release date: 15 October 2021
- Running time: 148 minutes
- Country: India
- Language: Telugu
- Box office: ₹51 crore

Most Eligible Bachelor is a 2021 Indian Telugu-language romantic comedy film written and directed by Bhaskar and produced by Bunny Vas and Vasu Varma on GA2 Pictures. It stars Akhil Akkineni and Pooja Hegde with music composed by Gopi Sundar, cinematography by Pradeesh Varma and editing by Marthand K. Venkatesh. The film follows the love story of NRI Harsha and stand-up comedian Vibha.

It was released on 15 October 2021 after being repeatedly postponed because of the ongoing COVID-19 pandemic. The film opened to positive reviews with critics praising the cast's performances (particularly Hegde), story and music. The film was commercially successful and grossed ₹51 crore worldwide. The film was Akkineni's first and only successful film.

== Plot ==
A couple drives along the road. All of a sudden, they hit a flock of lamb. The couple get a shock on noticing a man among the flock. The man is introduced to be Harsha (Akhil Akkineni). They asked why he was there and he starts narrating his story.

Past: Harsha is an NRI who lives in New York with aspirations to get married as soon as possible. His family then sets up a marriage for him that has to be completed within 20 days. Excited, Harsha buys himself a house and flies to India for his marriage. In India, he is set to meet 20 prospective brides and he ends up liking the first one he meets. However, his family insists on meeting more to see which one is the perfect match for him. Meanwhile, Harsha's mother tells him to drop a certain bride's details off since their horoscope did not match. Harsha opens the envelope to see that it is Vibha (Pooja Hegde) but he still goes to her father and gives back the details. He then realizes that Vibha's father is Subbu (Murali Sharma) with whom he had a horrible interaction earlier. On top of this, he loses Vibha's picture so Subbu holds his friend captive. In an attempt to find the picture, he meets Vibha at her stand-up comedy show and asks her for her picture. Vibha then asks a series of questions that disrupt Harsha's mentality about marriage. By being with Vibha, he realises that he wants to marry her.

Unexpectedly, Harsha has his marriage set with another girl. In an attempt to get together with Vibha, he goes to Subbu to convince him. However, in a turn of events, Subbu files a case against Harsha for being vulgar in each of his meetings with the brides. Vibha realizes that it was her words that affected Harsha and convinces Subbu to take back the case. Harsha, wanting answers, goes to Vibha and admits to liking her but she says she rejected him over twenty days ago as his mentality about marriage is not the same as hers. An enraged Harsha leaves for New York and tries to understand what went wrong. After attending Ganesh's 25th wedding anniversary and talking with his brother-in-law, he discovers that their marriage is toxic and that he shouldn't compromise at all.

Present: Nine months pass by and Harsha is a completely changed man with a new mindset. In an attempt to merge his and Megha's companies, he makes her fall for him. Megha's parents want her to marry Harsha even though Harsha still likes Vibha. With his marriage in 20 days, he decides to leave for India early so that he can see Vibha again. On returning to India, he finds out that Vibha does not want to get married due to a painful experience she has. So anonymously, Harsha tries to get Vibha to change back to her old lifestyle and manages to make her fall for him. However, Harsha's parents find out and make him leave Vibha while Subbu simultaneously lets Vibha know that Harsha is getting married and to give up. At his wedding, Vibha shows up to do a stand-up show and Harsha is shocked to see her there. She then narrates her experiences in life with Harsha and then sadly leaves. Megha, who knows all of this, allows Harsha to reunite with Vibha and he manages to convince everyone. In the end, Harsha and Vibha get married and go back to New York.

== Cast ==
- Akhil Akkineni as Harsha, an NRI
- Pooja Hegde as Vibha, a stand-up comedian
- Murali Sharma as Subramanyam “Subbu”, Vibha's father
- Pragathi as Lokeswari, Vibha's mother
- Neha Shetty as Megha
- Jayaprakash as Prakash, Harsha's father
- Aamani as Lakshmi, Harsha's mother
- Vennela Kishore as "Shoulder" Shankar
- Srikanth Iyengar as Ganesh, Harsha's godfather
- Amit Tiwari as Amit, Harsha's brother
- Posani Krishna Murali as Advocate Venkata Ramana.
- Getup Srinu as Sastry Jr., Harsha's family traditional Matchmaker and family's priest's son
- Sudigali Sudheer as Sudheer, Harsha's friend
- Sai Ketan Rao, Harsha's friend
- Kamakshi Bhaskarla as Harsha's friend
- Ajay as Ajay, Harsha's brother-in-law
- Satya Krishnan as Satya, Harsha's sister
- Y. Kasi Viswanath as Defense Lawyer Janardhan
- Giri Babu as Judge Nageswar Reddy
- Chandra Mohan as Police Chandram
- Abhay Betiganti as Abhay, Harsha's friend
- Amith

Cameo appearances

- Chinmayi as herself
- Rahul Ravindran as himself, a cousin to Megha
- Eesha Rebba as Geethika "Geetha"
- Faria Abdullah as Meenakshi
- Saanve Megghana as Meghana

== Production ==
=== Development ===
In February 2019, director Bhaskar teamed up with Akhil for GA2 Pictures production under Bunny Vas. The film marks Bhaskar's return to Telugu cinema after 4 years. In May 2019, the film was officially launched at Film Nagar Temple, Hyderabad with a pooja ceremony. The music is composed by Gopi Sunder, marking his second collaboration with Bhaskar after Bangalore Naatkal (2016). Other technicians include cinematographer V. Manikandan, editor Marthand K. Venkatesh and art director Avinash Kolla. Manikandan later replaced by Pradeesh Varma, due to the former's exit citing schedule conflicts. Director Vasu Varma is co-producing the film along with Bunny Vas. The title was announced as Most Eligible Bachelor in February 2020. The film is presented by Allu Aravind of Geetha Arts.

=== Casting ===
The film's casting crew auditioned over 100 actresses and models for leading actress role. Pooja Hegde was finalised as the lead actress in August 2019. Murali Sharma, Vennela Kishore, Jayaprakash, Pragathi and Aamani were cast in supporting role. Akkineni's role was Harsha, an NRI (non-resident Indian) while Pooja Hegde featured as a stand-up comedian named Vibha. In 2021, it was reported that Rahul Ravindran and Chinmayi, who have a cameo role would play couples in the film. In an interview with The Indian Express, Akhil told about the film that "We tried perfecting it more and more, and it has come to where it is today because of the time we had. I am so happy that finally after two years I am having a release".

=== Filming ===
The principal photography of the film began in July 2019 in Hyderabad. Hegde joined the sets in September 2019. The film is shot extensively in major portions of New York in mid-January 2020. Filming took place in Hyderabad in mid-March 2020, however, came to a halt after Akkineni was injured in the sets. Filming was further delayed due to the COVID-19 pandemic lockdown in India. Filming was resumed in September 2020, after seven months. Akkineni and Hegde joined the shoot the same month. Hegde wrapped the schedule in mid-December 2020 and again joined the sets on 25 December 2020 till 2 January 2021. The filming was completed in March 2021.

== Soundtrack ==
The music was composed by Gopi Sundar, who earlier collaborated with Bhaskar for the 2016 Tamil film Bangalore Naatkal. The music rights were bagged by Aditya Music.

The soundtrack consists of five original songs composed by Sundar, namely, "Manasa Manasa", "Guche Gulabi", "Ye Zindagi", "Leharaayi" and "Chitti Adugu". Lyrics are written by Surendra Krishna, Ananta Sriram, Sri Mani, Ramajogayya Sastry, and Sirivennela Seetharama Sastry.

== Release ==
Most Eligible Bachelor's release was scheduled for 2 April 2020, during Sri Rama Navami, but was delayed due to the COVID-19 pandemic. It was pushed back to January 2021, then to April 2021. In February 2021, the film's release date was announced as 19 June 2021. With the second wave of COVID-19 pandemic impacting India and shutting down cinemas again, the release was again delayed. In August 2021, the film was scheduled to be released on 8 October 2021.

Sarigama Cinemas have acquired the film's distribution rights in the United States.

=== Home media ===
In late September, the release date was rescheduled to 15 October 2021, on the occasion of Dussehra. Digital streaming rights of the film were acquired by both aha and Netflix. The film was premiered on aha on 19 November 2021 while it premiered on Netflix on 23 November 2021.

== Reception ==
=== Critical response ===
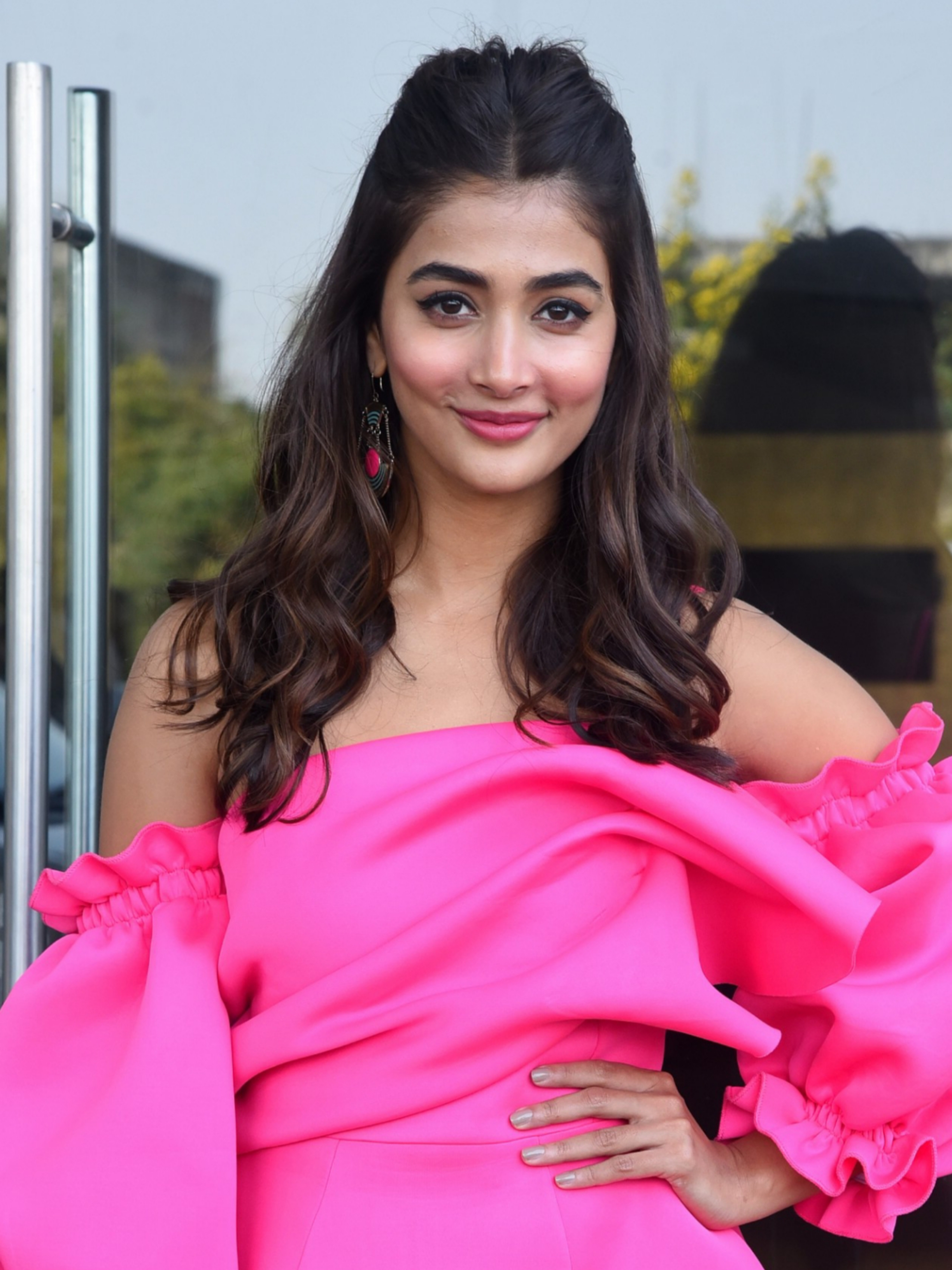
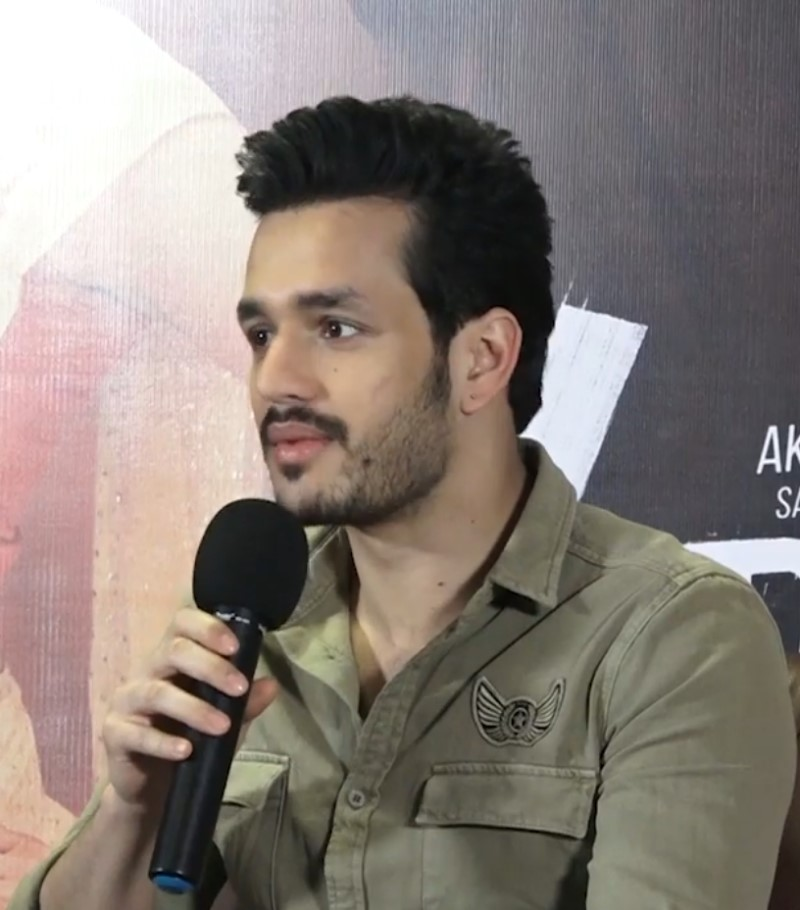
Critics praised the performances of the Pooja Hegde and Akhil Akkineni.

The film opened to positive reviews with critics praising casts performances (particularly Pooja Hegde and Akhil Akkineni), story, and music. Neeshita Nyayapati of The Times of India gave a rating of 3 out of 5 and cited it as "a breezy rom-com that lacks emotional depth". She further added that "Most Eligible Bachelor remains the story of a man who thinks he has it all to make a good husband and a woman giving him a reality check.". A critic of Sify too cited the same and rated it 2.75 out of 5, writing " Most Eligible Bachelor looks patchy, and goes all directions but Gopi Sundar's lilting songs and feel-good romantic moments save it". Firstpost also gave a rating of 3 out of 5, praising Bhaskar's work but giving mixed response to the story and screenplay. In their review, The Hans India wrote that "Most Eligible Bachelor has a thin storyline but it has got a lot of scopes to explore. Director Bhaskar who made a comeback to Tollywood is already known for dealing with strong yet sensitive emotions. However, for this project, the director put his focus on delivering the entertainment rather than pulling the project off with emotions. The first half looks fun and entertaining with a lot of interesting elements. However, the second half falls flat with weak writing and it gets into a preachy mode". The News Minute's Balakrishna Ganeshan cited that "the film makes progressive take on arranged marriage with a few misses", giving a rating of 3 out of 5.

Writing for Cinema Express, Ram Venkat Srikar wrote that the romance is boring and the comedy is forgettable. Srikar felt that most of the film's second half feels like a spin-off to the filmmaker's 2010 film Orange. He further wrote: "Most Eligible Bachelor holds its intentions in high regard and in the process, ends up being a tiring watch". The Hindu's Sangeetha Devi Dundoo felt that "Most Eligible Bachelor has technical finesse, a pleasing lead pair, offers a few laughs and hummable songs, but doesn’t sweep you off your feet. Pooja Hegde is lovely as Vibha and shows that she has more acting potential waiting to be tapped. Akhil Akkineni shows a lot of improvement as an actor and is good as Harsha. Among the melee of supporting actors, only Murali Sharma stands out."

J Jagannath of Business Standard opined that the director seems to have set out to write an Alice Munro-like story only to end up with something straight out of the slushpile every production house in this country is bombarded with, adding that "The movie has the soul and ambience of a fitting room at Zara. Apart from Akhil, Pradeesh Varma’s eye-pleasing cinematography and Gopi Sundar’s peppy soundtrack are the movie’s redeeming factors". Jeevi of Idlebrain in his review stated – "The climax of the film is preachy with Bommarillu Bhaskar trying to recreate the climax from his classic Bommarillu. Most Eligible Bachelor is not a bad film and it's better than most of the recent releases. However, it falls short of being a good film. The packaging of the film, music and Dasara holidays will do good for the film".

=== Box office ===
On the opening day, the film collected a gross collection of ₹18 crore worldwide. It collected a gross of ₹3 crore worldwide, on its second day. Thus, making the worldwide total two-days box office collection as ₹11 crore. 70% was done in 2 days of its release. Its third day gross collection was ₹30 crore. At the Australian box office, the film collected a gross of A$60,150 in the first three days. By the second day of release, it has collected a gross of $450,000 at the United States box office. After one week of its release, the total worldwide gross collections of the film were ₹24 crore. The film grossed over ₹38 in 10 days of its release. The film grossed ₹80 crore worldwide after 17 days of its release and became a commercial success.

== Accolades ==
Award	Date of ceremony (Note: Date is linked to the article about the awards held that year, wherever possible.)	Category	Recipient(s)	Result	Ref.
South Indian International Movie Awards	10 September 2022	Best Actress – Telugu	Pooja Hegde	Won	
South Indian International Movie Awards	10 September 2022	Critics Award for Best Actress – Telugu	Pooja Hegde	Won	
South Indian International Movie Awards	10 September 2022	Best Music Director– Telugu	Gopi Sundar	Nominated	
South Indian International Movie Awards	10 September 2022	Best Lyricist – Telugu	Sri Mani ("Leharaayi")	Nominated	
Filmfare Awards South	9 October 2022	Filmfare Award for Best Music Director – Telugu	Gopi Sundar	Nominated	
Filmfare Awards South	9 October 2022	Filmfare Award for Best Male Playback Singer – Telugu	Sid Sriram ("Manasa Manasa")	Nominated	
Santosham Film Awards	26 December 2022	Best Actress	Pooja Hegde	Won	
