= Amara Kaaviyam =

2014 Indian film by Jeeva Shankar

- Theatrical release poster
- Directed by: Jeeva Shankar
- Written by: Jeeva Shankar
- Produced by: Arya
- Starring: Sathya; Miya
- Cinematography: Jeeva Shankar
- Edited by: Sathish Suriya
- Music by: Ghibran
- Production companies: The Show People; Vignesh Pictures
- Release date: 5 September 2014
- Country: India
- Language: Tamil

Amara Kaaviyam (transl. Immortal epic) is a 2014 Indian Tamil-language teen romantic thriller film written and directed by Jeeva Shankar, who also handled the cinematography. Produced by Arya, the film stars his younger brother Sathya and Miya. The music was composed by Ghibran with editing by Sathish Suriya. The film was released on 5 September 2014. It was remade in Bengali in 2020 as Love Story.

== Plot ==
The film begins with Jeeva being taken to court, where he recalls his past. In 1988, at the beginning of his 12th grade, his friend Balaji falls in love with their classmate Karthika. Jeeva talks to Karthika but learns that she is actually in love with him. The next day, he accepts her love. Jeeva's father died when he was young, and his mother remarried. Once, when Jeeva and Karthika are out, the police catches them, and both their families are informed. Later, when Jeeva goes to apologise to Karthika's parents, her father hits him. Meanwhile, Karthika's father applies for a transfer. Jeeva and Karthika promise not to meet until their last exam. On the last day, Karthika leaves but gives a letter to Balaji and tells him to give it to Jeeva. However, Balaji does not give the letter and tries to convince Jeeva that Karthika does not love him anymore.

Jeeva and Karthika try to meet, but in vain. Finally, Jeeva learns Karthika's whereabouts, and they meet. When he meets her, he gets into a fight with her friend. He goes to her home and asks her if she still loves him. She says no, but later feels she should talk to him and marry him as proof. However, fate has other plans. The next day, when she meets him, he stabs her before she can say anything and later realises she is still in love with him. He tries to save her, but she dies in his arms. In the present, Jeeva escapes from the police to find Karthika's grave, then jumps off a cliff. The film ends with Jeeva and Karthika united in heaven, and their names written on the bark of the tree by Jeeva when they first met.

== Cast ==
- Sathya as Jeeva
- Miya as Karthika
- Ananth Nag as Balaji
- Thambi Ramaiah as Gnanam
- Sudeepa Pinky as Karthika's sister
- Aroul D. Shankar as Chandrasekhar, Jeeva's stepfather
- Rindhuravi as Jeeva's mother
- Vaidyanathan as Karthika's father
- Elizabeth as Karthika's mother
- Supergood Subramani as Corner shop owner
- Ashok Pandian as Judge

== Production ==
Following the success of his previous project Naan (2012), director Jeeva Shankar began work on his next film to be produced by Escape Artists Motion Pictures, while Yuvan Shankar Raja was announced as the music composer. Atharvaa was announced to play the lead role but consequently opted out during pre-production stages, and the production house dropped the film. Jeeva Shankar replaced him with Sathya in September 2013 with Sathya's brother, Arya producing the film, now titled Amara Kaaviyam, under his production house, The Show People. Sathya revealed that he initially had reservations about playing a schoolboy given his age but agreed after Jeeva Shankar mentioned Aamir Khan playing a college student in 3 Idiots (2009). He shed more than 10 kilograms (22 lb) for Amara Kaaviyam, and said the film was "on the lines" of Kaadhal Kondein (2003), 7/G Rainbow Colony (2004), and Kaadhal (2004). Malayalam actress Miya was signed as the lead actress, making her debut in Tamil. The film began production in October 2012 in Ooty, where filming lasted roughly 45 days. Most of the film was shot on sets.

== Soundtrack ==
The film's score and soundtrack were composed by Ghibran. The soundtrack album features six tracks, with lyrics written by Madhan Karky, Parvathy, P. Vetriselvan and Asmin. The album was released at Sathyam Cinemas on 27 June 2014.

== Critical reception ==
K. Siddharth of Sify wrote that "the movie moves at snail pace and the second half of the movie wanders aimlessly before convoluting in a tragic climax. Had the director tweaked his screenplay a little and had made it tight, Amara Kaaviyam would have lived up to its title". Sudhir Srinivasan of The Hindu noted, "Amara Kaaviyam, though fleetingly good, isn't the thriller that it should have been, and isn't the romance it intended to be". S Saraswathi of Rediff.com wrote, "Director Jeeva Sankar has attempted to portray an intense love story and he does succeed to some extent". M. Suganth of The Times of India rated the film 2.5 out of 5 stars.
