= The Show People =

Indian film studio by Actor Arya

- Type: Private
- Industry: Motion picture
- Founder: Arya
- Headquarters: Chennai, India
- Products: Film production Film distribution

The Show People is an Indian film production company established by Indian actor Arya. The studio has primarily been involved in the production of Arya's Tamil language films, having worked on films including Boss Engira Bhaskaran (2010) and Vasuvum Saravananum Onna Padichavanga (2015). Arya has also worked as a producer and distributor through the production studio August Cinema where he has worked with Prithviraj, Shaji Nadesan and Santosh Sivan on Malayalam language films.

== Career ==
Arya set up the production studio, The Show People, in early 2009 and revealed his intentions of working on three films a year. The first production by the studio was Padithurai directed by Suresh Kannan, an erstwhile assistant director to Bala, who worked on the film through a new stagename of Suka. Based on the novel Ettu Thikkum Madhayaanai by Nanjil Nadan, the film began production with newcomer Abhishek and Ananya in the lead roles, though Chandini Tamilarasan subsequently later replaced Ananya. Arya's brother, Sathya, was also briefly attached to the project but eventually did not work on the film. Despite completing its shoot in 2010, the film failed to have a theatrical release. The Show People subsequently had their first release with Rajesh's comedy film, Boss Engira Bhaskaran starring Arya, which the production studio presented. Produced by Vasan Visual Ventures and marketed by Red Giant Movies, the film performed well at the box office. The Show People was also later involved in the distribution of Selvaraghavan's Irandaam Ulagam in the regions of Singapore and Malaysia, though the film did not do well commercially.

The Show People made their first production venture through Amara Kaaviyam (2014) directed by Jeeva Shankar, starring Arya's brother Sathya and Miya in the lead roles. Arya took on the project after the film was dropped by Escape Artists Motion Pictures, and worked on the film through late 2013 and 2014. A romantic drama film set in Ooty during the 1980s, Amara Kaaviyam opened to mixed reviews but did not perform well at the box office. The studio's next production, Suseenthiran's drama film on cricket, Jeeva (2014), did well commercially. Co-produced with two other studios, Jeeva also won positive reviews from film critics. In 2015, Arya produced Vasuvum Saravananum Onna Padichavanga (2015), a comedy directed by Rajesh, which marked his 25th film as an actor.

== Filmography ==
Year	Film	Producer	Distributor	Notes	Ref
2010	Boss Engira Bhaskaran	No	Yes		
2013	Irandaam Ulagam	No	Yes		
2014	Amara Kaaviyam	Yes	No		
2014	Jeeva	Yes	No		
2015	Vasuvum Saravananum Onna Padichavanga	Yes	No		
2017	Kadamban	No	Yes		
2022	Captain	Yes	No		
2022	Ottu / Rendagam	Yes	No	Malayalam-Tamil film	
2025	DD Next Level	Yes	No	Presenter	
TBA	Sarpatta Parambarai Round 2	Yes	No		

== See also ==
- Arya
