= Ottu (film) =

2022 film directed by Fellini T.P.

- Theatrical release poster
- Directed by: Fellini T. P.
- Written by: S. Sanjeev
- Produced by: Arya; Shaji Nadesan
- Starring: Kunchacko Boban; Arvind Swamy; Eesha Rebba; Jackie Shroff
- Cinematography: Gautham Sankar
- Music by: A H Kaashif
- Production companies: August Cinema; The Show People
- Release dates: 8 September 2022 (Malayalam); 23 September 2022 (Tamil)
- Running time: 126 minutes
- Country: India
- Languages: Malayalam; Tamil

Ottu: Chapter 2 (transl. Betrayal) in Malayalam; titled Rendagam (transl. Duplicity) in Tamil is a 2022 Indian action thriller film written and directed by Fellini T. P. It was produced by August Cinema and The Show People. Shot simultaneously in Malayalam and Tamil, the film stars Kunchacko Boban, Arvind Swamy, Eesha Rebba and Jackie Shroff. The Malayalam version was released theatrically on 8 September 2022, while the Tamil version was released on 23 September 2022.

== Plot ==
The film starts with Kichu, a happy-go-lucky guy who wishes to move abroad with his girlfriend Kalyani. With the help of his father Chachan, Kichu is given a suspicious task from a group of people who are willing to pay him money to befriend a lonely man. They reveal that the lonely man is David, a gangster who lost his memory in a shootout in Udupi with confidential information about Rs. 30 crore worth gold. Kichu accepts the offer and proceeds to locate and befriend David. He eventually finds David working as a popcorn vender in a movie theater. Kichu awkwardly approaches him in many ways and finally succeeds in becoming friends with him and starts calling him "Anna" (brother). The gang forces Kichu to make David regain his memory. Kichu plans a road trip with David by convincing him that he has to deliver a car consignment to Udupi. David reluctantly agrees, and they start the trip. On the way from Mumbai to Udupi, they stop at Goa to chill and end up in an intense fight with a drunkard who gets beaten up by a drunk David. After the fight, David and Kichu sit at the beach at night, and a drunk Kichu reveals his true intention, by which David is surprised and starts to suspect Kichu. Finally, David confronts Kichu and asks him about everything. Kichu lies to him saying that he had heard from a friend. David keeps asking Kichu to make him talk to the friend as David feels like he is missing something. Finally, Kichu reveals that David was the ferocious gangster who was the right-hand man of his boss Asainar.

David surprisingly reveals that he is not David but his boss Asainar. Kichu, shocked to hear this, gets out of the car and contacts the gang, and they admit that it is in fact Asainar with Kichu in the car and offers Kichu 10 lakhs more if he takes Asainar to the shootout spot in Udupi. They finally reach the shootout spot, and Kichu goes outside the compound to get two teas, but the tea seller already keeps two teas ready for them and hands them over. Kichu, afraid of Asainar, offers him the tea and asks him if he remembered anything from the incident. Asainar says no and asks Kichu in return if he remembered anything addressing him by the name "Dawood" (David). Kichu gets confused by Asainar calling him Dawood, and Asainar finally reveals that it is Kichu who is actually David (Dawood) and it is he who lost his memory. Kichu does not want to believe all this. The gang arrives at the location, and they stand in support of Asainar instead of Kichu. Kichu gets confused and suddenly notices his father Chachan dressed up with the gang along with Kalyani. Shocked to see his whole life ending up as a lie, Asainar questions him on why David betrayed Asainar during the incident, of which Kichu cannot remember anything and breaks down.

Asainar and the gang take Kichu along with them to another enemy named Adiga. They arrive at Adiga's place, shoot down everyone at his bungalow, and find Adiga at the beach, who recognizes everyone including Kichu/David. He recollects everything from their origin stories in the past and finally expresses his anger towards Asainar. Asainar kills Adiga and takes Kichu to a silent location nearby. Asainar realizes that Kichu cannot remember being David and considers him of no use and spares him. Before leaving, Kichu asks what David used to call Asainar. Asainar responds "Annan” (brother) and indicates to Kalyani to finish him off after he leaves. Kalyani takes the gun and holds him at gunpoint. Kichu finally asks if he is really David, to which Kalyani nods. In his final moments, Kichu recollects telling Kalyani, when he thought Asainar was actually David, that if David realizes that he is David to even a small extent, no one around him can even think about touching him. During the final moment, Kichu suddenly transforms into David and fights back, killing everyone except Kalyani. David hugs and kisses Kalyani but ends up killing her, confirming that Kichu has actually turned into David. David takes a van and sits to remember a promise he had made to Asaianar's wife that he will kill Asainar. David sets out to hunt Asainar down while Asainar is arrogantly confident that no one can stop him, indicating that the tale will continue.

== Cast ==
- Kunchacko Boban as Kichu (fake) / David "Dawood", a powerful mafia syndicate member based on Mexico (real)
- Arvind Swamy as David "Dawood" (fake) / Assainaar (real)
- Eesha Rebba as Kalyani, a powerful mafia don based on Columbia
- Jackie Shroff as Adiga
- Aadukalam Naren as Sreedharan (Chachan)
- Amalda Liz as Kichu's informer about Assaianar / David
- Sreekumar Menon as Xavier
- Jins Baskar as Randaman, Kichu's informer about Assaianar / David
- Siyad Yadu as Yadu
- Laban Ranae as Photographer

== Production ==
The film was to mark Kunchacko Boban's first film in Tamil cinema, and also marks Arvind Swamy's comeback to Malayalam cinema after Devaraagam. On 17 March 2021, it was announced that Telugu actress Eesha Rebba would be playing the female lead opposite Boban which marks her debut in both Malayalam and Tamil cinema. The film was produced by actor Arya under the production banner August Cinema and The Show People. On 19 September 2021, the shooting of the film was wrapped.

== Music ==
Ottu / Rendagam

Soundtrack album by Arulraj Kennady
- Released: 26 August 2022
- Recorded: 2021–2022
- Genre: Feature film soundtrack
- Languages: Malayalam; Tamil
- Producer: Arulraj Kennady

Arulraj Kennady chronology
Bachelor (2021)	Ottu / Rendagam (2022)	Nanban Oruvan Vantha Piragu (2024)

Singles from Ottu / Rendagam
- 1. "Orey Nokkil / Orey Paarvai" Released: 5 February 2022

The film's music was composed by Arulraj Kennady.

Malayalam Track listing
No.	Title	Lyrics	Singer(s)	Length
1.	"Orey Nokkil"	Vinayak	Shweta Mohan	3:09
2.	"Ila Kozhiyum"	Vinayak	Yadu Krishnan	2:50
3.	"Thakkura"	Pa. Vijay	AH. Kaashif, Ash Prince, Amina, Sarthak Kalyani	4:00
4.	"Oro Nagaravum"	Vinayak	KS. Harisankar	2:44
5.	"Irave"	Vinayak	KS. Harisankar, Pooja Venkatraman	3:03
6.	"Ottu (Theme Song)"	Rhyko	Anand Sreeraj	3:06
Total length:				18:47

Tamil Track listing
No.	Title	Lyrics	Singer(s)	Length
1.	"Orey Paarvai"	Mohan Raj	Amina Rafiq	3:12
2.	"Poove"		Sam Vishal	2:44
3.	"Iyarkai"	Mani Amudhavan	Sugandh Shekar	2:49
4.	"Uraintheney"		Pradeep Kumar	3:02
5.	"Thakkura"		Amina Rafiq	4:00
6.	"Rendagam (Theme Song)"	Vamanan	Anand sreeraj	3:02
Total length:				18:49

== Release ==
The film was released theatrically on 8 September 2022. The film was originally scheduled for release on 2 September 2022 but due to censor issues of the Tamil version the release date was postponed. The teaser of the film was released on 3 January 2022.

=== Reception ===
Anna M. M. Vetticad of Firstpost gave the film 1.5 out of 5 stars and wrote, “Ottu has a premise with potential but starts sputtering early on in the absence of a worthwhile script. It picks up in fits and starts, but the engine dies on it long before the final scene.” Sajin Srijith of Cinema Express gave the film 2 out of 5 stars and wrote "The choreography of the film is straight out of a bad B-movie." A critic from Asianet News wrote after reviewing the film that "Ottu is a film that gives a different experience in the recent action thrillers in Malayalam in terms of background and presentation." A critic for The News Minute rated the film 2 out of 5 stars and wrote "Ottu – meaning betrayal – gives you the feeling that more than a particular character in the film, it is you, the audience, who were taken for a ride." S. R. Praveen of The Hindu wrote after reviewing the film that "The way Ottu proceeds does not make one excited enough for the promised prequel and the sequel."

The Tamil version of the film received negative reviews.

== Future ==
The makers announced in the film's end credits that the film will have a prequel titled Ottu: Chapter 1 and a sequel titled Ottu: Chapter 3.
