= Arya (actor) =

Indian actor and film producer (born 1980)

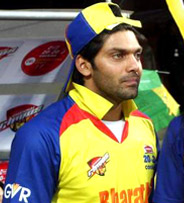
- Arya at CCL Match
- Born: Jamshad Cethirakath; 11 December 1980 (age 45); Trikaripur, Kasaragod, Kerala, India
- Education: Crescent Engineering College (BTech in Computer Science and Engineering)
- Occupations: Actor; Film producer
- Years active: 2005–present
- Spouse: Sayyeshaa (m. 2019)
- Children: 1
- Relatives: Sathya (brother); Sumeet Saigal (father-in-law)

Jamshad Cethirakath (born 11 December 1980), known by his stage name Arya, is an Indian actor and film producer who predominantly appears in Tamil cinema and a few Malayalam and Telugu films. Arya has won two Filmfare Awards South and two Tamil Nadu State Film Awards. He was included on the 2015 edition of the Forbes India Celebrity 100, a list based on the top earning Indian celebrities.

Arya made his breakthrough portraying rogue characters in Vishnuvardhan's Arinthum Ariyamalum (2005) and Pattiyal (2006). He later won critical acclaim for playing an Aghori in Bala's Naan Kadavul (2009). He gained further commercial success with the release of the period drama Madrasapattinam (2010), the comedy film Boss Engira Bhaskaran (2010), family action film Vettai (2012) and Atlee's family film Raja Rani (2013).

In 2013, he appeared in three more Tamil films: R. Kannan's comedy film Settai, Vishnuvardhan's action thriller Arrambam and Selvaraghavan's fantasy film Irandam Ulagam. In 2021, he appeared in Pa. Ranjith's sports film Sarpatta Parambarai as a main lead, which garnered him high critical acclaim.

== Early and personal life ==
Arya was born in Trikaripur, Kerala, on 11 December 1980. He did his schooling in SBOA Matriculation and Higher Secondary School, Chennai and then graduated with an engineering degree from Crescent Engineering College in Vandalur, Chennai. His younger brother Sathya has also appeared in Tamil films.

Arya participated in the Vätternrundan Motala cycle race and won a medal. Arya was the prospective bridegroom on the show Enga Veetu Mapillai aired on Colors Tamil searching for a perfect bride from the 16 contestants.

On 14 February 2019, Arya announced his engagement to actress Sayyeshaa, and the two were married on 10 March 2019. The couple have a daughter who was born in July 2021.

== Career ==
=== 2005–2007 ===
While working as an assistant software engineer, Arya was approached by the cinematographer Jeeva to audition for his Ullam Ketkumae in 2003. The pair had lived in the same neighbourhood. Arya signed on for the project and was given the stage name by Jeeva, derived from "Yaaru ya" (who is that?). The film was delayed. Hence, Arya's first appearance was as Kutty, in Vishnuvardhan's Arinthum Ariyamalum. The film featured Arya as the adopted rogue son of a gangster . Critics reported that Arya in a supporting role "walks away with all the applause" and "has everything in him to make the big league". In an interview several years later, Arya also stated, "If people know Arya, it is because of the "Thee pidika" track", a song from the film's soundtrack, crediting and expressing gratitude to its composer Yuvan Shankar Raja. His next release, the delayed Ullam Ketkumae, portraying Arya as a college cricketer, also carried good reviews and was a successful venture at the box office. His third release in 2005, was the campus romance story, Oru Kalluriyin Kathai opposite Sonia Agarwal, took a strong opening but failed to find commercial acceptance. However, after also gaining favourable reviews for his performance, Arya was labelled as the new "pin-up" of Tamil cinema at the time and attracted offers for films.

His next, Igor's thriller Kalabha Kadhalan, where he played an engineer pursued romantically by an aggressive sister-in-law, won favourable reviews from critics but failed commercially. Arya collaborated with Vishnuvardhan again in the successful gangster flick, Pattiyal, where Bharath also played another leading role. The film, was shot across the slums of Chennai and told the story of two ruthless underworld hitmen, with Pooja and Padmapriya also playing major roles. Upon release, the film gained positive reports and the lead pair's performances were praised with a critic claiming that scenes between Arya and Bharath were "touching" while Arya's use of facial expressions and body language "fits exactly for the kind of role he plays". The film consequently became a big box office success and placed Arya as a leading actor in Tamil cinema. Arya subsequently appeared in the action film Vattaram as Burma, but the film's release coincided with bigger budgeted releases and the film was crowded out from box office success, despite gaining favourable reviews. In 2007, Arya played a guest appearance in Cheran's Maya Kannadi as himself before his long-delayed Oram Po, previously known as Auto, released in late 2007. Prior to release the film gained cult status for its innovative trailer, with Arya playing a Chennai-based auto driver who competes in races at nights, while Pooja was his pair again. The film directed by duo Pushkar-Gayathri opened to very positive reviews, with most critics claiming that the film was a "riot" and "entertaining", praising characterisations. Critics from the Hindu labelled Arya as "terrific as the cocky yet lovable Chandru" saying that his "good physique should cement his 'heartthrob' status".

=== 2009–2012 ===
Arya's next release was in 2009, with Bala's long delayed drama film on Aghori's, Naan Kadavul. The film was initially launched with Ajith Kumar in early 2005, but after he dropped out Arya signed on in mid 2006. The three previous films made by Bala were known notoriously for their dark themes, their rogue leads and their long delays in production but also that his two previous protagonists Vikram and Suriya had risen from obscurity to stardom after featuring in his films. As per, the film took three years to complete with Arya growing a full-length beard for the production thus making him unable to sign other projects, while he often cited the intense pressure and the hardships of the shoot. Arya appeared as an Aghori in the film situated in Kasi but is forced to relocate to Tamil Nadu, where he duly encounters an underworld which gains collections through the torture of the handicapped, with Pooja, yet again playing a significant role. The film opened to positive reviews with unanimous praise on Arya's portrayal of Rudran, with a critic from Sify citing "Arya pumps life and blood and gets under the skin of Rudran, making his animal like character so convincing" while adding that "he has delivered a performance that is hard to forget even days after you've watched the film". Though he was highly expected to win several awards for the portrayal, he failed but garnered two nominations from notable award committees. After a guest role in Rajesh's Siva Manasula Sakthi, he then collaborated with Vishnuvardhan for the third time in his romantic-thriller, Sarvam, an anthology film also featuring Trisha Krishnan, J. D. Chakravarthy, Rohan Shiva and Indrajith. Arya played a carefree young architect who falls in love and pursues Trisha, before another thread in the film interlocks with his portions and changes his situation. The film however only went to gain average reviews from critics, and eventually became a surprise failure at the box office.

2010 became a career-defining year for Arya, with the widespread success of his films establishing him as a leading actor in South Indian films. His first release was his debut in Telugu films, where he played the antagonist in Varudu co-starring Allu Arjun. Despite opening to positive reviews, the film failed to match expectations at the box office, although Arya's performance was praised by critics, claiming that "powerful, menacing, quiet yet indomitably spirited" in his role while another reviewer claimed he outshone Allu Arjun. His next venture was the period film Madrasapattinam depicting a love story from the 1940s, co-starring newcomer Amy Jackson and directed by A. L. Vijay. The big budget film progressed with its schedules with little publicity for a year, with Arya portraying the role of Ilamparithi, a dhobi situated in a community of Washermanpet who falls in love with the daughter of a governor. The film gained mostly positive reviews from critics and became successful at the box office, although most reviewers agreed his performance was outshone by Jackson's. While a critic cited that Arya "looks stone-faced no matter what the situation", another cited the performance was "awe-inspiring". He then appeared in Rajesh's comedy film Boss Engira Bhaskaran, which Arya's production house, The Show People, also co-produced. The film portrayed Arya as a spoiled, carefree Kumbakonam youth and his comic timing in the film alongside Nayantara and Santhanam received positive responses from critics. Furthermore, the film went on to become his first blockbuster, running for over hundred days in multiplexes. His final release in 2010 was in a dual role in the romantic travelogue film, Chikku Bukku by Manikandan, featuring Shriya Saran and Preetika. The film, shot extensively in London and Karaikudi, received a mixed response and fared averagely at the box office, with Arya's performance being described by critics as from "watchable and dependable" to "morose and silent".

In 2010, Arya made a speech at an awards function in Dubai, organised by a Malayalam television channel. The Film Employees Federation of South India (FESFI) president V. C. Guhanathan, without directly referring to Arya by name, accused him of having "belittled the Tamil film industry". The South Indian Film Artistes Association (SIFAA), however, supported Arya, condemning Guhanathan "for making irresponsible and false statements" about an actor who "strives for the welfare of Tamil film industry." Arya eventually clarified in a letter, that he had "never made derogatory statements about the Tamil film industry", which was his "bread and butter", further quoting: "I can never forget such a support extended by my fans. If I had hurt anyone's feelings, I am really sorry about that."

Arya's first release in 2011 was a minor role in Santhosh Sivan's Malayalam historical-fantasy film Urumi, where he played two characters. The film which also featured Prithviraj, Genelia D'Souza and Nithya Menen, won positive reviews with reviewers from Sify.com labelling it a "miniature masterpiece of moods". In March 2011, he was signed by director Mani Ratnam to essay the role of Arulmozhi Varman in his epic film Ponniyin Selvan, based on the same-titled novel by writer Kalki Krishnamurthy, which however did not materialize. Arya then appeared in his second film with Bala in Avan Ivan, where he portrayed the lead role of Kumbedran Sami alongside Vishal. The film opened to mixed reviews but the performance of the lead actors won acclaim with the critic from The Hindu citing that "Arya is a perfect foil for Vishal — his brash demeanour and genuine affection for his stepbrother come out well in many of the scenes" and that "he deserves appreciation for taking up a role that isn't as heroic as Vishal's and presenting it convincingly". Arya next appeared in Linguswamy's Vettai, an action entertainer featuring an ensemble cast of Madhavan, Amala Paul and Sameera Reddy. The film opened to positive reviews in January 2012 and went on to become a commercial success, with critics praising Arya's performance in the film as a rogue youngster who defends his timid police officer brother. He went on to appear in the promotional song for Kazhugu alongside several other actors and then played a cameo role in the climax of Rajesh's Oru Kal Oru Kannadi of a village chieftain.

=== 2013-2019 ===
In 2013, he was seen in four Tamil films. He first appeared alongside Santhanam and Premji in R. Kannan's comedy film Settai, a remake of the 2011 Hindi film Delhi Belly. The film opened to mixed reviews and average collections, with a critic noting Arya looks "wooden, tired and disinterested". He had three more releases in the latter half of the year, Atlee's romantic comedy Raja Rani that had him acting amongst an ensemble cast of Nayantara, Jai and Nazriya Nazim, Vishnuvardhan's action thriller Arrambam which featured him alongside Ajith Kumar, Nayantara and Thapsee Pannu and Selvaraghavan's magnum opus fantasy film Irandam Ulagam with Anushka Shetty. He had worked out to build a huge frame and six-pack abs to fit the muscular lead role in Irandam Ulagam. Raja Rani and Arrambam were highly successful at the box office.

He also acted in UTV Motion Pictures' Purampokku to be directed by S. P. Jananathan and the thriller Meagamann directed by Magizh Thirumeni. He will also be working with Rajesh in a romantic comedy which will be produced by his home production house The Show People. He will have guest appearances in three forthcoming films: Madha Gaja Raja, Parimala Thiraiyarangam and Kadhal 2 Kalyanam, which features his brother, Sathya in the lead role. In September 2014, he was named as the replacement for Fahadh Faasil in Lijo Jose Pellissery's Double Barrel .

In 2018, Arya made his Kannada-language debut in the comedy film Rajaratha and he also appeared in the film Ghajinikanth, a Tamil remake of the Telugu film Bhale Bhale Magadivoy. His next films were Pathinettam Padi, Magamuni and Kaappaan released in 2019.

He produces films under his production company, The Show People and is a partner in the Trivandrum-based Malayalam production company August Cinema.

=== 2021-present ===
In 2021, Teddy is first Tamil film to use Indian animation. He plays a boxer in Pa. Ranjith's Sarpatta Parambarai. He was seen in the horror comedy film in Sundar C's Aranmanai 3 and co-starring with Vishal in the action thriller Enemy directed by Anand Shankar. In 2022, Arya played is a soldier in the Indian Army in the science fiction thriller film, Captain (2022). The film received negative reviews. The next, he starred in the action drama Kathar Basha Endra Muthuramalingam (2023). He joined the cast of the Telugu action film, Saindhav (2024).

== Other works ==
In 2010, Arya ventured into film production in order to promote new talents and help funding small budget films. He established the banner The Show People and first produced the comedy film Boss Engira Bhaskaran he himself starred in, following which he produced Suka's Padithurai, which remains unreleased. He also ventured into film distribution in 2013, as he bought the FMS (Singapore and Malaysia) theatrical rights of his own film Irandaam Ulagam.

Arya is the ambassador of television and print marketing campaigns of Otto, the flagship brand of Pothys clothing.

- Arya started a production company called The Show People, and has produced a number of films.

== Filmography ==
Key
†	Denotes films that have not yet been released

=== As actor ===
- Note: all films are in Tamil, unless otherwise noted.

List of Arya film credits as actor
Year	Film	Role(s)	Notes	Ref.
2005	Arinthum Ariyamalum	Kutty	Filmfare Award for Best Male Debut – South	
2005	Ullam Ketkumae	Emaan		
2005	Oru Kalluriyin Kathai	Sathya		
2006	Kalabha Kadhalan	Akhilan		
2006	Pattiyal	Kosi		
2006	Vattaram	Burma		
2007	Maya Kannadi	Himself	Cameo appearance	
2007	Oram Po	Chandru		
2009	Naan Kadavul	Rudhran	Nominated, Filmfare Award for Best Actor – Tamil; Nominated, Vijay Award for Best Actor	
2009	Siva Manasula Sakthi	Arun	Cameo appearance	
2009	Sarvam	Karthik		
2010	Varudu	Diwakar	Telugu film	
2010	Madrasapattinam	Ilam Parithi	Nominated, Filmfare Award for Best Actor – Tamil; Nominated, Vijay Award for Best Actor	
2010	Kaadhal Solla Vandhen	Doctor	Cameo appearance	
2010	Boss Engira Bhaskaran	Bhaskaran	Also distributor	
2010	Va	Chandhru	Cameo appearance	
2010	Chikku Bukku	Arjun Sekhar & Sekhar	Double role	
2011	Urumi	Chirakkal Kothuwal, Thangachan	Malayalam film; Double role	
2011	Avan Ivan	Kumbuduren Sami		
2012	Vettai	Gurumoorthy		
2012	Oru Kal Oru Kannadi	Rajini Murugan	Cameo appearance	
2013	Settai	Jayakanthan (JK)		
2013	Raja Rani	John	Tamil Nadu State Film Award for Best Actor	
2013	Arrambam	Arjun	Nominated, Filmfare Award for Best Supporting Actor – Tamil	
2013	Irandaam Ulagam	Madhu Balakrishnan & Maruvan	Double role	
2014	Kathai Thiraikathai Vasanam Iyakkam	Himself	Cameo appearance	
2014	Jeeva	Cameraman	Cameo appearance	
2014	Meaghamann	Arul IPS (Siva)		
2015	Purampokku Engira Podhuvudamai	Balu		
2015	Romeo Juliet	Himself	Cameo appearance	
2015	Indru Netru Naalai	Scientist	Cameo appearance	
2015	Vasuvum Saravananum Onna Padichavanga	Saravanan	25th film	
2015	Double Barrel	Majnu	Malayalam film	
2015	Yatchan	Chinna		
2015	Trisha Illana Nayanthara	Harish	Cameo appearance	
2015	Size Zero	Abhishek	Telugu film	
2015	Inji Iduppazhagi	Abhishek		
2016	Bangalore Naatkal	Arjun (Aju)		
2016	Nambiyaar	Baskar	Cameo appearance	
2017	Mupparimanam	Himself	Cameo appearance	
2017	The Great Father	ASP Andrews Eapen	Malayalam film	
2017	Kadamban	Kadamban		
2018	Rajaratha	Vishwa	Kannada film	
2018	Iruttu Araiyil Murattu Kuththu	Himself	Cameo appearance	
2018	Ghajinikanth	Rajinikanth		
2019	Pathinettam Padi	Major Ayyappan	Malayalam film; Cameo appearance	
2019	Magamuni	Mahalingam & Muniraj	Double role	
2019	Kaappaan	Abhishek Chandrakant Varma		
2021	Teddy	Shiva		
2021	Sarpatta Parambarai	Kabilan	Filmfare Critics Award for Best Actor – Tamil; Tamil Nadu State Film Award for Best Actor; Nominated, Filmfare Award for Best Actor – Tamil	
2021	Aranmanai 3	Saravanan		
2021	Enemy	Rajiv		
2022	Captain	Captain Vetriselvan		
2022	Coffee with Kadhal	Captain Santhosh	Cameo appearance	
2023	Vasantha Mullai	Bharath	Cameo appearance	
2023	Kathar Basha Endra Muthuramalingam	Muthuramalingam alias Kathar Basha		
2024	Saindhav	Manas	Telugu film	
2024	The Boys	Robin Singh	Cameo appearance	
2024	Thiru.Manickam	Himself	Cameo appearance	
2025	Madha Gaja Raja	'Dickey' David	Cameo appearance	
2026	Mr. X	Gautham Surya Pratap		
2026	Ananthan Kaadu	Vetri	Malayalam-Tamil bilingual film	
TBA	Vettuvam †	TBA	Filming	

=== As producer ===
- Arya started a production company called The Show People, and has produced a number of films.

List of Arya film credits as producer
Year	Film	Language	Notes
2014	Amara Kaaviyam	Tamil	
2014	Jeeva	Tamil	
2015	Vasuvum Saravananum Onna Padichavanga	Tamil	
2015	Double Barrel	Malayalam	
2016	Darvinte Parinamam	Malayalam	
2016	Anuraga Karikkin Vellam	Malayalam	
2017	The Great Father	Malayalam	
2022	Ottu / Rendagam	Malayalam / Tamil	
2022	Captain	Tamil	
2024	Grrr	Malayalam	
2025	Devil's Double Next Level	Tamil	Co-producing along with Santhanam

List of Arya web series credits as producer
Year	Name	Language	Platform	Notes
2024	1000 Babies	Malayalam	Disney+ Hotstar	

=== Television ===
List of Arya television credits
Year	Title	Role	Channel/Platform	Notes
2018	Enga Veetu Mapillai	Host	Colors Tamil	
2023	The Village	Dr. Gautham Subramanian	Amazon Prime Video	Streaming series
