= Sathya (Tamil actor) =

Indian actor (born 1985)

- Born: Shahir Cethirakath; 4 June 1984 (age 42); Trikaripur, Kasaragod District, Kerala, India
- Occupation: Actor
- Years active: 2008–2015
- Relatives: Arya (brother); Sayyeshaa (sister-in-law)

Shahir Cethirakath, better known as Sathya, is an Indian actor, who has worked in Tamil language films. The brother of actor Arya, he first began filming for Kadhal 2 Kalyanam in 2008, though the film remains unreleased. After debuting in Puthagam (2013), he made a breakthrough in Jeeva Shankar's romantic drama film Amara Kaaviyam (2014).

== Career ==
Both Arya and Sathya went through many scripts before selecting the script of Kadhal 2 Kalyanam for the latter to make his acting début, in which Sathya would be playing the role of a radio jockey. Sathya, after being assigned for the role, had visited Bollywood actor Anupam Kher's acting school in Mumbai to "hone his acting skills", before starting to shoot, besides sitting with and observing professional radio jockeys at a radio station. The film, co-starring Divya Spandana began production in October 2008, but has languished in production hell, prompting Puthagam to become his first release. The film, directed by Vijay Adiraj, opened in January 2013 to mixed reviews with a critic noting Sathya "tries to imitate his more famous brother Arya and needs improvement in all departments". After a lukewarm response to his debut, Arya chose to produce Sathya's next film, Jeeva Shankar's romantic drama film Amara Kaaviyam (2014). Sathya played a school boy named Jeeva, a character that required him to shed more than 10 kg, and featured in the film based on a real event. The film garnered positive reviews from screenings prior to release and had a successful soundtrack composed by Mohamaad Ghibran, prompting a wide release in September 2014. Sathya earned mixed reviews for his work in the film with a critic from The Hindu noting "he grows into the role", while another reviewer noted "he is convincing when he has to be a brooding young man " In 2015, the actor was first seen in K. S. Thangasamy's film Ettuthikkum Madhayaanai, which began production in July 2013.

== Personal life ==
Sathya married his girlfriend Bhavana in June 2018.

== Filmography ==
Year	Film	Role	Notes
2013	Puthagam	Mohan	
2014	Amara Kaaviyam	Jeeva	
2015	Ettuthikkum Madhayaanai	Natesan (Natty)	
