= Bhaskar (director) =

Indian film director

- Born: Bhaskar Natarajan; Vellore, Tamil Nadu, India
- Other name: Bommarillu Bhaskar
- Education: Film and Television Institute of Tamil Nadu
- Occupations: Director, producer, writer, screenwriter.
- Years active: 2006–present

Bhaskar is an Indian film director, who works predominantly in Telugu cinema.

== Early life ==
Bhaskar was born in Vellore, Tamil Nadu. He was a student of the Film and Television Institute of Tamil Nadu, Chennai.

== Career ==
In his early career, he worked as associate director on films Bhadra and Arya.

His directorial debut, Bommarillu starring Siddarth and Genelia D'Souza, earned him two Nandi Awards for Best Debut Director and Best Original Screenplay. The way the film's dialogues were conceived was rather unique—him and Abburi Ravi stayed in a closed room and used lines from casual conversations as dialogues in the film. His next venture, Parugu starring Allu Arjun, was also a box office hit. However, Orange, which starred Ram Charan, garnered mixed reviews but later became a cult classic. His fourth film was Ongole Gittha, which was a box office failure. He made his Tamil debut in 2016 with Bangalore Naatkal, starring Arya, Bobby Simha, Sri Divya, Rana Daggubati, and Parvathy. The film was a remake of the Malayalam film Bangalore Days (2014), and it too was a box office failure. In 2021, he directed Most Eligible Bachelor with Akhil Akkineni and Pooja Hegde, which received positive reviews and became a success.

== Filmography ==
Key
†	Denotes films that have not yet been released

- All films are in Telugu unless noted otherwise

As a director
Year	Title	Notes
2006	Bommarillu	Nandi Award for Best First Film of a Director; Nandi Award for Best Screenplay Writer; Nominated, Filmfare Award for Best Director – Telugu
2008	Parugu	Nominated, Filmfare Award for Best Director – Telugu
2010	Orange	
2013	Ongole Githa	
2016	Bangalore Naatkal	Tamil film
2021	Most Eligible Bachelor	
2025	Jack	
