= Kadhal 2 Kalyanam =

Unreleased Indian film by Milind Rau

- Directed by: Milind Rau
- Written by: Milind Rau; Baradwaj Rangan
- Produced by: Sunitha Tati
- Starring: Sathya; Ramya; Anuja Iyer
- Cinematography: P. S. Vinod
- Edited by: Leo John Paul
- Music by: Yuvan Shankar Raja
- Production companies: Mirchi Movies; East Coast Entertainment
- Country: India
- Language: Tamil

Kadhal 2 Kalyanam (transl. Love to Marriage) is an unreleased Tamil-language romantic comedy film directed by newcomer Milind Rau that stars Sathya (in what would have been his acting debut) and Ramya, whilst, Jayashree, Nagendra Prasad, Kasthuri and Anuja Iyer play pivotal roles. Noted film critic Baradwaj Rangan had written the dialogues, while Yuvan Shankar Raja composed the film's score and soundtrack. The cinematography and editing were handled by P. S. Vinod and Leo John Paul, respectively. Pre-production works began by mid-2008, while filming continued for over one year, being completed by July 2010. The film was jointly produced by Mirchi Movies and East Coast Entertainment.

== Cast ==
- Sathya as Arul
- Ramya as Anitha
- Anuja Iyer
- John Vijay
- Nagendra Prasad
- Kasthuri
- Mouli
- S. N. Lakshmi
- Jayashree

== Production ==
Both Arya and Sathya went through many scripts before selecting the script of Kadhal 2 Kalyanam, in which Sathya would be playing the role of a radio jockey. Sathya, after being assigned for the role, had visited Bollywood actor Anupam Kher's acting school in Mumbai to "hone his acting skills", before starting to shoot, besides sitting with and observing professional radio jockeys at a radio station. Ramya signed the film in October 2008, shortly after completing her third Tamil film Vaaranam Aayiram, describing her character as a "career-oriented, independent woman in the corporate world." Further more, former lead actress Jayashree was signed in November 2008 for a significant role, which would mark her comeback to feature films after a decade. In December 2008, Kasthuri was roped in to appear in a supporting role and play the wife to the character played by Nagendra Prasad, while John Vijay accepted to play a drunkard in the film. The film's shooting, however, got stalled midway in 2009 for unknown reasons and was resumed in 2010 only.

Since a large part of the film would take place at a radio station, art director Rajeevan erected a radio jockey booth in Chennai. The film notably became the first film after 40 years to be shot at all the six most important shrines of the Hindu deity Muruga, the Six Abodes of Murugan ("Arupadaiveedu"), in Tamil Nadu, with a specially designed bus being used for the tour. One of the songs, "Vellai Kodi", was shot in Thiruchendur, one of the six towns of Murugan's abodes, with Nagendra Prasad choreographing the song, besides appearing himself in it, while "Thedi Varuven" was shot in Puducherry. In July 2010, two songs were canned; a "bachelor song" ("Naa Vetta Pora Aadu"), choreographed by Robert, was filmed at a farmhouse near Red Hills, in which Sathya and Divya, along with junior artists, took part, following which the last song ("Idhu Kadhalai Irunthidumo") was shot. Rajeevan had erected a special "jungle set" at AVM Studios for the song, which was choreographed under the direction of Dinesh. With the completion of the song, the shooting was eventually finished after one-and-a-half years.

After a long setback the film's producers, Mirchi Movies announced that shooting has been fully completed on 29 May. The film began their promotional activity in June 2013 with the film's trailer released 1 June 2013, while the film's release was anticipated to be around September. However, it remains unreleased.

== Soundtrack ==
Kadhal 2 Kalyanam

Soundtrack album by Yuvan Shankar Raja
- Released: 18 March 2011
- Recorded: 2009–2010
- Studios: Prasad Studios, Chennai
- Genre: Film soundtrack
- Length: 28:58
- Language: Tamil
- Label: Sony Music
- Producer: Yuvan Shankar Raja

Yuvan Shankar Raja chronology
Pesu (2011)	Kadhal 2 Kalyanam (2011)	Vaanam (2011)

The soundtrack to the film was composed by Yuvan Shankar Raja. The songs were composed and recorded in 2009 and 2010, with Chinmayi during the release time stating that she had recorded her song more than two years back, and Yuvan Shankar citing that he had handed over the Master recording in September 2010. However, due to the long delay in the making of the film, the soundtrack album was released in March 2011 only, after several postponements. Though Sony Music released the album in a "soft audio launch" directly to stores on 18 March, a special launch was later held on Radio Mirchi where all songs were unveiled and airplayed, with Arya, Sathya and Milind participating.

The album features six songs overall, with Yuvan Shankar Raja himself, who stated on Twitter that the songs would be "young and fresh", having lent his voice for one of the songs. The album also features singer-composer Toshi Sabri's first song in Tamil, which was his second collaboration with Yuvan Shankar after the song "Seheri" in Oy!. Telugu singer-actor Anuj Gurwara was also supposed to have to sing one song in the film, which however, was not featured in the soundtrack album. The song "Naa Vetta Pora Aadu" was co-sung by Ragini Sri, a participant in the second season of the reality-based singing competition Airtel Super Singer, however, she was falsely credited as Roshini in the first batch of CDs.

All lyrics are written by Snehan, except where noted.

Track listing
No.	Title	Singer(s)	Length
1.	"Ithu Kadhalai Irinthidumo"	Benny Dayal, Chinmayi	5:18
2.	"Natpin Kathaigalai"	Krish	3:55
3.	"Naa Vetta Pora Aadu"	Yuvan Shankar Raja, Ragini Sri	5:07
4.	"Vellai Kodi"	S. P. B. Charan	4:20
5.	"Thedi Varuven"	Toshi Sabri	5:44
6.	"Ennakaaga Unnakaaga" (Pa. Vijay)	Naresh Iyer, Andrea Jeremiah	4:34
Total length:			28:58

Milliblog reviewed it as "Kadhal 2 Kalyanam is a perfectly balanced soundtrack in an ideal mixed bag!" Music Aloud gave 7.25 out of 10 stating "Strictly run-of-the-mill stuff from Yuvan Shankar Raja for Kadhal 2 Kalyanam with couple of enjoyable, but zero exceptional tracks." The Times of India gave the album 3 out of 5 stars.
