= Preetika =

Preetika is a given name. Notable people with the name include:

- Preetika Chawla, Indian film actress
- Preetika Rao, Indian actress and film-columnist
