= Bangalore Naatkal =

2016 film directed by Bhaskar

- Theatrical release poster
- Directed by: Bhaskar
- Written by: Pon Partibhan (dialogues)
- Based on: Bangalore Days by Anjali Menon
- Produced by: Prasad V. Potluri
- Starring: Arya; Bobby Simha; Rana Daggubati; Sri Divya; Parvathy Thiruvothu
- Narrated by: Bobby Simha
- Cinematography: K. V. Guhan
- Edited by: Marthand K. Venkatesh
- Music by: Gopi Sunder
- Production company: PVP Cinema
- Distributed by: PVP Cinema
- Release date: 5 February 2016
- Running time: 156 minutes
- Country: India
- Language: Tamil
- Box office: est. ₹30 crore

Bangalore Naatkal (transl. Bangalore Days) is a 2016 Indian Tamil-language coming of age comedy drama film directed by Bhaskar. It is a remake of the 2014 Malayalam film Bangalore Days written and directed by Anjali Menon. The film stars Arya, Sri Divya, Bobby Simha, Rana Daggubati, and Parvathy Thiruvothu, and tells the story of three cousins who live their childhood dream of living and enjoying in the city of Bangalore. Unlike the original, the film received mixed reviews from critics and was a box-office failure, with critics and audiences drawing comparisons with the original.

== Plot ==
The film's story revolves around three cousins Divya "Ammu" Raghavan, Kannan "Kutty" and Arjun "Ajju" are cousins who shares a close bond since their childhood. Kutty is a software engineer whose heart and soul lies in his village. Ajju, whose parents are divorced, is a bike mechanic who lives his life on his own terms. Ammu has completed her B.Com and aspires to do her MBA from IIM but is compelled to marry a workaholic corporate executive, Shivaprasad "Prasad" because of her family astrologer's dire predictions. After their wedding, Ammu moves to Bangalore as Prasad is settled there. Kutty too relocates to Bangalore for his job, while Ajju joins a biker gang as a mechanic in the same city.

Ammu feels lonely as Prasad often goes on long corporate trips and ignores her. Her only solace is the time she gets to spend with her cousins. One day, upon inspecting a room in their apartment that Prasad never lets anyone enter, she is shocked to find it filled with photos, knickknacks and possessions of a woman. In thought of not having a place in Prasad's heart and life, she leaves Prasad and returns to her village in sorrow.

Naive Kutty, who wants a traditional, modest, saree-clad girl for a wife, falls in love with an air hostess Lakshmi on a flight from Bangalore to Coimbatore. They date, and Kutty changes from a reserved and shy person to a trendy person to impress her, but his dreams are shattered when her ex-boyfriend arrives at her apartment, and he realizes that she was only trying to get back with him. He breaks off his relationship with her.

Ajju was a bike racer, but due to a misdemeanor, was given a one-year ban from racing. Rakesh, who is now a top-bike racer, troubles Ajju, causing a fight to break out. Ajju falls for RJ Sarah, but when he meets her in person, he learns that she is a paraplegic. He starts to like her attitude and follows her. They become good friends, but Ajju is saddened when he learns that Sarah is moving to Australia on a university scholarship.

Meanwhile, as Ammu and Prasad are in the middle of getting a divorce, Ajju learns that a few years back, Prasad was a bike racer. He then went by the name Shiva and was the leader of his biker gang. Shiva had given up on racing after he was involved in an accident that killed his girlfriend Grace (the girl whose photos and possessions that Ammu had discovered in Prasad's room). Upon knowing what happened, Ammu decides to return to Bangalore and works towards her MBA. She gradually wins over a repentant Prasad and soon arranges for him to meet Grace's parents. After the meeting, Prasad is able to let go of his past. Ammu forgives him, and they get their marital life on track.

Ajju gets a chance to race on the same day that Sarah has to leave for Australia. With Ammu, Kutty and Prasad cheering for him, he wins the race. After the race, Ajju realizes how important Sarah is to him and his life. He pleads with her to not go to Australia. Sarah forgoes her scholarship to stay with him in Bangalore. In the end, Kutty marries his neighbor in Bangalore, a European Bharathanatyam dancer Michelle, who has embraced Indian culture. The film ends with Ammu, Prasad, Ajju, and Sarah breaking into Kutty's room and all of them posing for a photo.

== Cast ==
- Arya as Arjun "Aju"
- Sri Divya as Divya "Ammu" Raghavan
- Bobby Simha as Kannan "Kutty"
- Rana Daggubati as Shivaprasad, Divya's husband
- Parvathy Thiruvothu as RJ Sarah Elizabeth
- Raai Laxmi as Lakshmi
- Paris Laxmi as Michelle
- Prakash Raj as Francis, Grace's father
- Pattimandram Raja as Raghavan, Divya's father
- Sriranjani as Divya's mother
- Saranya Ponvannan as Kannan's mother
- M. S. Bhaskar as Kannan's father
- Rekha as Sarah's mother
- Vinaya Prasad as Natasha's mother
- Sijoy Varghese as Coach Zachariah
- Sajid Yahiya as Saamy
- Samantha Ruth Prabhu as Grace (Cameo appearance)

== Production ==
=== Development ===
The success of Anjali Menon's 2014 romantic drama film Bangalore Days, prompted producers Dil Raju and Prasad V Potluri to acquire the Tamil and Telugu remake rights for the film in June 2014. Bommarillu Bhaskar was signed on to direct the film, while the producers sought to cast the seven lead roles from actors who were renowned in both the Tamil and Telugu film industries. Initial reports suggested that the main lead role portrayed by Dulquer Salman would be played by Arya and the roles of the other two cousins would be played by Naga Chaitanya and Samantha Ruth Prabhu. Siddharth was also approached to portray the supporting role played by Fahadh Faasil, while Prasanna and Bharath were also linked to roles in the film. Similarly reports suggested that Nani and Sharwanand were being considered to portray two of the lead roles instead. The team also approached Nazriya to be a part of the cast, but the actress was reluctant to feature in films after her marriage. However a delay in casting led to the film being delayed till the following year.

=== Casting ===
In January 2015, the official cast of the film was announced with Arya, Siddharth and Samantha selected, as initially expected. Nithya Menon was also added to the cast to play a different character instead of her role from the original. Meanwhile, Bobby Simha and Sunil were also signed on to play the same role, with Simha in the Tamil film and Sunil in the Telugu version. Simha had requested PVP Cinemas to cast him in the role after being approached by the production studio for a different film. However, by the end of the month, Siddharth and Samantha exited amidst speculation that the pair were uncomfortable to feature opposite each other, after a recent break-up. Subsequently, Rana Daggubati and Sri Divya were bought into replace the pair, while Parvathy Thiruvothu opted to reprise her role from the original ahead of Nithya. Raai Laxmi was signed on to portray the role played by Isha Talwar, while it was reported that Nayanthara was in talks to portray a guest appearance in the film. Nayantara eventually was replaced by Samantha, who worked on the film for a week, shooting for a guest role. Despite indications that Santhosh Narayanan would be selected to compose the film's music, Gopi Sunder was retained from the original. The film was launched in mid March 2015 in Chennai, with the cast attending the ceremony. It was revealed that the Telugu version of the film would be made by a completely different team led by Dil Raju and would start after the Tamil version.

== Music ==
The soundtrack features 6 songs composed by Gopi Sunder. The song I Want To Fly is featured in the film as "Unnodu Vazha" with lyrics completely in Tamil instead of the original English version.

Track list

Bangalore Naatkal

Soundtrack album by Gopi Sunder
- Released: 2016
- Recorded: 2016
- Studios: Sound Factory, Cochin
- Genre: Film soundtrack
- Language: Tamil
- Label: Think Music
- Producer: Gopi Sunder

Gopi Sunder chronology
Bhale Bhale Magadivoy (2015)	Bangalore Naatkal (2016)	Puli Murugan (2016)

No.	Title	Singer(s)	Length
1.	"Naan Maati Konden"	Karthik	3:05
2.	"Aaga Motham Ennai"	Gopi Sunder	5:02
3.	"En Vizhiyin Kanavu"	Gopi Sunder, Anna Katharina Valayil	5:17
4.	"Thodakkam Mangalyam"	Vijay Yesudas, Sachin Warrier, Divya S. Menon	3:52
5.	"Paraparapa Oru Ooru"	Ranjith	3:13
6.	"I Want to Fly/Unnodu Vazha"	Anna Katharina Valayil	3:08

== Reception ==
=== Critical response ===
Hindustan Times wrote "Bommarillu Bhaskar's just opened Tamil work, Bangalore Naatkal – which is a remake of Anjali Menon's Bangalore Days in Malayalam – also lends itself to a good measure of comparison. Honestly, the core idea behind Menon's work – about the average Keralite's craze for Bangalore (Bengaluru) – does not ring true in Bhaskar's Tamil edition." The Hindu wrote "Bangalore Naatkal quite worked for me, despite the aforementioned minor niggles. It made me well up at all the right moments, even if it didn't get me laughing as much as the original." Times of India wrote "this remake works to a large extent (if you haven't seen the original, even better), because the director, Bommarillu Bhaskar hasn't made any drastic change to the original script and manages to capture the emotional drama of the scenes." Rediff wrote "Remakes are never easy and director Bhaskar's Bangalore Naatkal is far from perfect, but the film does have its moments, especially for those who missed the original." Behindwoods wrote "Overall, despite its lively storyline, Bangalore Naatkal is let down by the treatment and casual performances." IndiaGlitz.com gave 2.8/5 and wrote " Bangalore days is fresh, youthful and certainly a good one time watch with family for its entertainment quotient is spot on.

=== Box office ===
The film collected ₹7.94 lakh (US$8,200) in United States and ₹4.94 lakh (US$5,100) in UK.
