= Prasad V. Potluri =

Indian entrepreneur and philanthropist (born 1970)

Potluri Vara Prasad
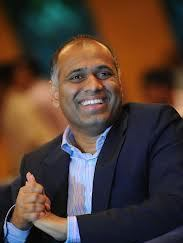
- Born: Potluri Vara Prasad; September 8, 1970 (age 56); Vijayawada, Andhra Pradesh, India
- Education: NSM Public School; Andhra Loyola College; KL University; Nagarjuna University
- Occupations: Entrepreneur; Ex Co-owner of Kerala Blasters F.C. Owner of Hyderabad HotShots; CMD – PVP Ventures Managing Director of PVP Cinema
- Spouse: Jhansi Sureddy
- Children: 2
- Website: https://www.pvpglobal.com

Potluri Vara Prasad (born September 8, 1970) is an Indian entrepreneur. He serves as the Executive Chairman and Managing Director of PVP Ventures Ltd., as well as the Managing Director and Executive Director of Picturehouse Media Ltd.

== Early life ==
Potluri Prasad was born in Vijayawada, Andhra Pradesh, India. He attended NSM Public School in Vijayawada and pursued a degree in Mechanical Engineering at Nagarjuna University. In 1994, he completed a Master’s degree at a university in Australia.

== Career ==
In 1996, Prasad founded Procon, an IT services company, which was acquired by RCM Technologies in 1998. In 2000, he launched Albion Orion Company, which later merged with SSI in a transaction valued at $63.65 million.

In 2001, Prasad co-founded Irevna, a company specialising in knowledge process outsourcing services, which was acquired by CRISIL in 2005. In the following year, 2006, he founded PVP Ventures, a publicly traded corporation focused on media and entertainment financing.

Under Prasad's leadership, PVP Ventures ventured into film production with PVP Cinema and acquired the Hyderabad Hotshots franchise in the Indian Badminton League, participating in the inaugural season in 2013.

In 2008, PVP Ventures launched real estate development projects, including PVP Square in Hyderabad. Prasad has also been listed as a member of the Indo-American Chamber of Commerce and the Hyderabad Management Association, according to available business association records.
