= Baba Bhaskar =

Indian Choreographer and Director

- Born: 27 December 1973; Chennai, Tamil Nadu, India
- Occupations: Choreographer; Director; Actor; Socialist
- Years active: 2006–present
- Spouse: Revathy Bhaskar
- Children: 2

Baba Bhaskar is an Indian dance choreographer, director and actor who works mainly in Tamil and Telugu language films in addition to some Hindi, Malayalam, Kannada films.

== Career ==
Baba Bhaskar made his directorial debut with Kuppathu Raja, which released in 2019 after beginning production in 2017. In 2019, he participated as a contestant in Bigg Boss Telugu 3 and became 2nd Runner up.

== Filmography ==
=== Choreographer ===
Year	Film	Language
2006	Thiruvilayadal Arambam	Tamil
2006	Idhu Kadhal Varum Paruvam	Tamil
2006	Sainikudu	Telugu
2007	Parattai Engira Azhagu Sundaram	Tamil
2007	Malaikottai	Tamil
2007	Polladhavan	Tamil
2008	Muniyandi Vilangial Moonramandu	Tamil
2008	Aegan	Tamil
2008	Kotha Bangaru Lokam	Telugu
2008	Silambattam	Tamil
2009	Villu	Tamil
2009	Padikkadavan	Tamil
2009	Aadhavan	Tamil
2009	Vettaikaaran	Tamil
2009	Magadheera	Telugu
2010	Kutty	Tamil
2010	Kedi	Telugu
2010	Naan Mahaan Alla	Tamil
2010	Singam I	Tamil
2010	Moscowin Kavery	Tamil
2010	Uthamaputhiran	Tamil
2011	Siruthai	Tamil
2011	Mappillai	Tamil
2011	Venghai	Tamil
2011	Kandireega	Telugu
2012	Lovely	Telugu
2012	3	Tamil
2012	Saguni	Tamil
2012	Maattrraan	Tamil
2013	Alex Pandian	Tamil
2013	Jabardasth	Telugu
2013	Ethir Neechal	Tamil
2013	Singam II	Tamil
2013	Pattathu Yaanai	Tamil
2013	Varuthapadatha Valibar Sangam	Tamil
2014	Maan Karate	Tamil
2014	Jigarthanda	Tamil
2014	Velaiilla Pattadhari	Tamil
2014	Poojai	Tamil
2015	Anegan	Tamil
2015	Vai Raja Vai	Tamil
2015	Komban	Tamil
2015	Massu Engira Masilamani	Tamil
2015	Maari	Tamil
2015	Trisha Illana Nayanthara	Tamil
2015	Thanga Magan	Tamil
2016	Rajinimurugan	Tamil
2016	Pugazh	Tamil
2016	Marudhu	Tamil
2016	Mapla Singam	Tamil
2016	Remo	Tamil
2016	Kodi	Tamil
2016	Enakku Innoru Per Irukku	Tamil
2016	Amma Kanakku	Tamil
2016	Wagah	Tamil
2017	Singam III	Tamil
2017	Kavan	Tamil
2017	Pa. Pandi	Tamil
2017	Velaiilla Pattadhari 2	Tamil
2017	Hara Hara Mahadevaki	Tamil
2018	Thaanaa Serndha Koottam	Tamil
2018	Iruttu Araiyil Murattu Kuththu	Tamil
2018	Kadaikutty Singam	Tamil
2018	Ghajinikanth	Tamil
2018	Seema Raja	Tamil
2018	Saamy Square	Tamil
2018	2.0	Tamil
2018	Maari 2	Tamil
2019	Petta	Tamil
2019	Chikati Gadilo Chithakotudu	Telugu
2019	Kuppathu Raja	Tamil
2019	Devarattam	Tamil
2019	Kaappaan	Tamil
2019	Namma Veettu Pillai	Tamil
2021	Pulikkuthi Pandi	Tamil
2021	Jagame Thandhiram	Tamil
2021	Devadas Brothers	Tamil
2022	Liger	Telugu Hindi
2022	Etharkkum Thunindhavan	Tamil
2022	Yaanai	Tamil
2022	Iravin Nizhal	Tamil
2022	Viruman	Tamil
2023	Bagheera	Tamil
2023	Jigarthanda DoubleX	Tamil
2023	Captain Miller	Tamil
2024	Indian 2	Tamil
2024	Raayan	Tamil
2025	Nilavuku En Mel Ennadi Kobam	Tamil
2025	Maaman	Tamil
2025	Thalaivan Thalaivii	Tamil
2025	Idli Kadai	Tamil

2026 Irumudi Telugu

Meesaya Murukku 2 Tamil

=== Actor ===
Year	Title	Role	Language	Notes
2006	Idhu Kadhal Varum Paruvam	Ajees	Tamil	
2017	Pa. Pandi	Villager	Tamil	
2018	Ghajinikanth		Tamil	special appearance
2021	Jagame Thandhiram	Theerthamalai	Tamil	
2022	Nenu Meeku Baaga Kavalsinavaadini	Theju's uncle	Telugu	
2023	Bagheera		Tamil	special appearance
2023	Circle	Puttur Ganesh	Telugu	
2024	The Boys	House owner	Tamil	
2024	Aalakaalam		Tamil	
2024	Teenz	Bus conductor	Tamil	
2025	Maaman	Ravi	Tamil	
2025	Thalaivan Thalaivii	Soman's relative	Tamil	
2026	Jana Nayagan	Vetri’s friend	Tamil	
2026	Meesaya Murukku 2	Older Tiger Siva / Driver Siva	Tamil	

=== Dancer ===
Year	Title	Song	Language
2009	Padikkadavan	"Hey Vetri Vela"	Tamil
2010	Kutty	"Lifey Jollyda"	Tamil
2010	Moscowin Kavery	"Gramam Thedi"	Tamil
2011	Mappillai	"Onnu Rendu"	Tamil
2013	Varuthapadatha Valibar Sangam	"Varuthapadatha Valibar Sangam"	Tamil
2014	Maan Karate	"Royapuram Peter"	Tamil
2014	Pongadi Neengalum Unga Kadhalum	"Oru Ponnu"	Tamil
2014	Velaiilla Pattadhari	"What A Karuvaad"	Tamil
2015	Anegan	"Danga Maari Oodhari"	Tamil
2015	Maari	"Maari Thara Local"	Tamil
2014	Jigarthanda	"Paandi Naattu"	Tamil
2015	Komban	"Karuppu Nerathazhagi"	Tamil
2018	Seema Raja	"Vaaren Vaaren"	Tamil
2016	Rajinimurugan	"Ennama Ipdi Pandringalemaa"	Tamil

=== As a director ===
Year	Title	Language	Ref.
2019	Kuppathu Raja	Tamil	

== Television ==
Show	Television Channel	Language	Notes
Biggboss 3 Telugu (2019)	Star Maa	Telugu	Contestant: (2nd Runner Up)
Dhee Jodi	ETV	Telugu	Judge
Sa Re Ga Ma Pa The Next Singing ICON (2020)	Zee Telugu	Telugu	Guest appearance (Episode 8)
Adhu Idhu Yedhu (Season 1)	Star Vijay	Tamil	Contestant (Episode 122 - 5 November 2011)
Cooku With Comali (Season 2)	Star Vijay	Tamil	Contestant: (3rd Runner Up)
Start Music	Star Vijay	Tamil	Contestant (25 April 2021 - Episode)
Comedy Raja Kalakkal Rani	Star Vijay	Tamil	Judge
Alitho Saradaga	ETV	Telugu	Guest appearance
Dancee Plus Telugu (2020)	Star Maa	Telugu	Judge
Comedy Stars	Star Maa	Telugu	Guest appearance (As a Host)
Sixth Sense (Season 4)	Star Maa	Telugu	Guest appearance
Start Music	Star Maa	Telugu	Contestant (7 March 2021 - Episode)
Rechipodam Brothers	ETV	Telugu	
Bigg Boss 5 Telugu (2021)	Star Maa	Telugu	Guest appearance
Master Chef			As a Choreographer
Behindwoods Celebrity Star Dancer	BehindwoodsTV	Tamil	Judge
Ishmart jodi season 2	Star Maa	Telugu	Contestant (Along with his wife Revathy)
Bigg Boss Non-Stop (season 1)	Disney+ Hotstar	Telugu	Contestant
Pottikku Potti – R U Ready	Colors Tamil	Tamil	Judge
Dance Jodi Dance Reloaded	Zee Tamil	Tamil	Judge
Super Jodi	Zee Tamil	Tamil	Judge
Sa Re Ga Ma Pa Seniors (season 3)	Zee Tamil	Tamil	Special guest (Episode 33)
Dance Jodi Dance Reloaded	Zee Tamil	Tamil	Judge (season 2)

== Awards and nominations ==
Baba Bhaskar Awards and Nominations
Awards and nominations
Award	Wins	Nominations
Vijay Awards	0	3
Filmfare Awards	2	0
South Indian International Movie Awards	0	1
Ananda Vikatan Cinema Awards	1	0
Behindwoods Awards	1	0

Year	Award	Category	Work	Result	Ref.
2009	Vijay Awards	Best Choreographer	"Daddy Mummy" From Villu	Nominated	
2011	58th Filmfare Awards South	Best Choreography	Singam	Won	
2011	58th Filmfare Awards South	Technical Award	"Kadhal Vandhale" from Singam	Won	
2014	8th Vijay Awards	Best Choreographer	"Local Boys" from Ethir Neechal	Nominated	
2015	9th Vijay Awards	Best Choreographer	"What A Karuvadu" from Velaiyilla Pattathari	Nominated	
2015	SIIMA - Tamil	Best Dance Choreographer	"What A Karuvadu" from Velaiyilla Pattathari	Nominated	
2015	Ananda Vikatan Cinema Awards	Best Choreographer	For the song "Maari Thara Local" from Maari	Won	
2021	Behindwood Awards	Best Entertainer - Special Mention on Reality Television	Cooku With Comali 2 - Finalist	3rd Runner-up	
