= Ghajinikanth =

2018 film by Santhosh P. Jayakumar

- Film poster
- Directed by: Santhosh P. Jayakumar
- Written by: Santhosh P. Jayakumar
- Based on: Bhale Bhale Magadivoy by Maruthi
- Produced by: K. E. Gnanavel Raja
- Starring: Arya; Sayyeshaa
- Cinematography: Ballu
- Edited by: Prasanna GK
- Music by: Balamurali Balu
- Release date: 3 August 2018
- Running time: 137 minutes
- Country: India
- Language: Tamil

Ghajinikanth is a 2018 Indian Tamil-language romantic comedy film written and directed by Santhosh P. Jayakumar and produced by K. E. Gnanavel Raja. The film stars Arya and Sayyeshaa in the lead roles. It is a remake of the 2015 Telugu film Bhale Bhale Magadivoy.

== Plot ==
The protagonist, Rajinikanth (Arya), was born in a theatre screening of Dharmathin Thalaivan, and like Rajinikanth's characters in that film, he has a forgetful nature. The film doffs its hat at the older film by introducing its protagonist in underwear, as he has forgotten to wear pants. This condition of Rajini is a constant source of embarrassment to his parents Ramanathan (Aadukalam Naren) and Lakshmi (Uma Padmanabhan), as they cannot find a suitable match for him. One prospective girl's father Sathyamoorthy (Sampath Raj) insults Rajini because of this. As fate would have it, Rajini ends up falling in love with Sathyamoorthy's daughter Vandhana (Sayyeshaa), but she is unaware of Rajini's forgetfulness. How long can Rajini continue with this facade, especially with Ajay (Lijeesh), a cop who wants to marry Vandhana and is trying to expose him?

== Cast ==
- Arya as Rajinikanth Ramanathan aka Ghajinikanth
- Sayyeshaa as Vandhana Sathyamoorthy
- Aadukalam Naren as Ramanathan, Rajini's father
- Uma as Lakshmi Ramanathan, Rajini's mother
- Sampath Raj as Sathyamoorthy, Vandhana's father
- Sathish as Mohan
- Lijeesh as Inspector Ajay
- Rajendran as Rajini's friend
- Karunakaran as Karuna
- Kaali Venkat as Uthaman
- Delhi Ganesh as Rajini's grandfather
- Sulakshana as Rajini's grandmother
- Madhan Bob as Rajini's boss
- Manobala as Kamal Vishwanathan
- K. Sivasankar as Mohan's father
- Venkat Subha as broker
- Linga as Police officer
- Rahul Thatha as area friend
- Neelima Rani as Gayathri, Vandhana's sister-in-law
- K. S. G. Venkatesh as Gayathri's father
- Dubbing Janaki as Kamal's mother
- Jangiri Madhumitha as Mrs. Uthaman
- Sheela as Gayathri's mother
- Rekha Suresh as Mrs. Kamal Vishwanathan
- Hema Rajkumar
- Karnaa Radha as shopkeeper
- Baba Bhaskar in a special appearance

== Production ==
In October 2015, a Tamil remake of the Telugu film Bhale Bhale Magadivoy (2015) with G. V. Prakash Kumar as the protagonist was announced, but never came to fruition. In late November 2017, Studio Green announced that they would collaborate with filmmaker Santhosh P. Jayakumar for a comedy film starring Arya and Sayyeshaa in the lead roles. Titled Ghajinikanth, the film was revealed to be a remake of Bhale Bhale Magadivoy, and the first look poster had Arya in an ethnic attire resembling a character portrayed by Rajinikanth in the 1988 film, Dharmathin Thalaivan. The title is a portmanteau of the words "Ghajini" and "Rajinikanth", and was titled so because of the forgetful nature of Rajinikanth's character in Dharmathin Thalaivan and Suriya's character in Ghajini (2005). The shoot began with a song sequence shot in Thailand, before the team completed scenes in Chennai. Santhosh was directing this alongside another film Iruttu Araiyil Murattu Kuththu (2018). Shooting ended in 39 days.

== Soundtrack ==
The soundtrack was composed by Balamurali Balu.

Ghajinikanth

Soundtrack album by Balamurali Balu
- Released: 2018
- Genre: Tamil
- Length: 10:34
- Language: Tamil
- Label: Think Music
- Producer: Balamurali Balu

Balamurali Balu chronology
Traffic Ramasamy (2018)	Ghajinikanth (2018)	Chikati Gadilo Chithakotudu (2020)

No.	Title	Lyrics	Singers	Length
1.	"Hola Hola"	Madhan Karky	Benny Dayal, M. M. Manasi, Christopher Stanley	3:26
2.	"Bar Song"	Ku Karthik	Rahul Nambiar	3:00
3.	"Aariyane"	Kabilan Vairamuthu	Shweta Mohan	2:47
4.	"Karu Karu"	Balamurali Balu	Sanjith Hegde, Aishwarya Ravichandran	1:21
Total length:				10:34

== Release ==
Production budget of the film was valued at ₹8 crore excluding Arya's salary. The satellite rights of the film were sold to STAR Vijay.

=== Critical reception ===
Indian Express wrote "There are several ways to keep the viewer engaged - it could be through the story, its characters, the writing or the filmmaking. Sadly, Ghajinikanth doesn't tick any of the boxes." Times of India wrote "Despite the film offering great scope for comedy, Ghajinikanth is entertaining only in places." Sify called it "Family-friendly comedy entertainer" and wrote "Overall, Ghajinikanth is a time pass entertainer and you will enjoy watching it with family and friends!"
