= Hara Hara Mahadevaki =

2017 film by Santhosh P. Jayakumar

- Theatrical Release Poster
- Directed by: Santhosh P. Jayakumar
- Written by: Santhosh P. Jayakumar
- Produced by: S. Thangaraj
- Starring: Gautham Ram Karthik; Nikki Galrani
- Cinematography: Selvakumar S. K.
- Edited by: San Lokesh (trailer)
- Music by: Balamurali Balu; Vishal Chandrasekhar (one song)
- Production company: Thangam Cinemas
- Distributed by: Blue Ghost Pictures
- Release date: 29 September 2017
- Running time: 122 minutes
- Country: India
- Language: Tamil

Hara Hara Mahadevaki is a 2017 Indian Tamil-language adult romance film written and directed by Santhosh P. Jayakumar and Produced By Thangam Cinemas. The film features Gautham Ram Karthik and Nikki Galrani in the lead roles, while Balamurali Balu composes the film's music. Produced by Thangam Cinemas and released by Blue Ghost Pictures, the venture began production in November 2016. The film's title is based on a song from Motta Shiva Ketta Shiva (2017), also starring Galrani.

== Plot ==
The film opens up with Thalaivar (Ravi Mariya) and his assistant Idi (Namo Narayana). In order to win the election as Chief Minister, Thalaivar tells Idi about his plan to plant a bomb under the stage during the elections. The bomb is hidden in a bag that resembles the various other bags given by the ruling party. Idi assures Thalaivar that he can find the right men for the job.

The scene then shows Ramya (Nikki Galrani), who begins collecting all of her personal items. She calls her ex-boyfriend Hari (Gautham Karthik), but he does not answer. An irritated Ramya then calls Hari's best friend Kathir (Sathish). She tells Kathir to inform Hari to collect all of the memorabilia that she gave him while they were dating and to come meet her. Kathir then goes to A to Z Funeral Services, which Hari owns and operates. The two then go to Hari's house to collect the clothes that Ramya gave him, including a pair of Angry Birds underwear. Hari puts all the items into a ruling party bag. He and Kathir then set off to the liquor store to get drunk before meeting Ramya.

Meanwhile, Idi recruits Spike (Rajendran) and Kumaru (Karunakaran) to plant the bomb. Spike is the supposed brains of the duo, while Kumaru is the harder worker of the two. Thalaivar tells them that should the operation go sideways, they should cut the red wire on the bomb, rendering it useless. He warns them not to touch the green wire or the bomb will explode immediately. Thalaivar gives Spike and Kumaru some money in advance. After they leave, Kumaru tells Spike that they should keep some money aside for their expenses but give the rest away to their families. An emotional Spike agrees.

The scene then switches over to Ravi (Bala Saravanan). He observes a man getting thrown out of a shop for trying to pay with counterfeit money. He then tracks the man down and shows him how to properly exchange counterfeit money. The man takes Ravi to his boss, Cash. Cash then gives Ravi counterfeit money and asks him to launder it. After Ravi does so successfully, Cash gives Ravi 10 million counterfeit rupees in a ruling party bag and asks him to exchange this as well.

Meanwhile, Kumaru visits Jalaja, a prostitute, along with the money he had supposedly given to his family. Unbeknownst to him, Spike also comes to visit Jalaja. Kumaru tries to hide from Spike, and hilarity ensues when he finds out that Jalaja has not only been sleeping with him and Spike but almost every man in the apartment complex.

The scene then cuts to Ramya, who visits her friend (Gayatri Rema) to get back the shoes that Ramya had lent her. Ramya says that she does not want anything that reminds her of Hari, who gave her the shoes in the first place. Ramya rents out a room at Hara Hara Mahadevaki Resort, where she meets up with her friend. Her friend asks Ramya the story of how she and Hari met. Ramya initially refuses but blames God for her and Hari meeting.

It is revealed through a flashback that Ramya and Hari met at the temple. Seeing that it is an auspicious day, Ramya bathes in the river near the temple. Hari is also bathing in the river as well. When he emerges from the river, two kids steal his towel. A naked Hari tries to make his way back to the river but is blocked by Ramya, who faints upon seeing Hari naked. Ramya runs away from the scene. Later that day, Ramya skips class to go out with her friends to the movies. Ramya sees her Head of Department from the College and tries to hide from him. She accidentally runs into the men's bathroom, where she comes across Hari again. She inadvertently sees his genitals. Hari then accuses her of stalking him and chases her out of the bathroom. Ramya runs out of the bathroom and is seen by the Head of Department. The Head of Department, mistaking her presence in the men's bathroom, bans her from attending her classes. Ramya decides to try to find Hari so that he can explain to the Head what actually happened. Ramya finds Hari urinating against a wall in the street and accidentally sees his genitals once more. An angry Hari yells at her until a nearby police officer stops the fight. After explaining both sides of the story, the police officer advises Ramya and Hari to reconcile. Hari then goes to the college and explains to the Head what actually happened. The Head of Department apologizes to both of them and allows Ramya to come back to class. A grateful Ramya gets Hari's number, and the two begin dating soon afterward.

Meanwhile in the present day, Hari is driving to the liquor store. He picks up Spike, who is hitchhiking. After dropping off Spike, Hari accidentally picks up the bag with the bomb, and Spike accidentally takes the bag with the Angry Birds underwear. Meanwhile at Hara Hara Mahadevaki, Geetha and her husband look for their eight-year-old daughter Harini, who has gone missing. A stranger advises the two to call the police. Inspector Hameed takes up the case and promises to find their daughter. It is revealed that the stranger from before was the one who kidnapped Harini. He calls Geetha and demands ten million rupees. In the flashback, Ramya calls Hari over to her house after her family goes to Thirupathi.

== Cast ==
- Gautham Ram Karthik as Hari
- Nikki Galrani as Ramya
- Sathish as Kathir
- Karunakaran as Kumaru
- Rajendran as Spike
- Bala Saravanan as Ravi
- Gayatri Rema as Shwetha
- Ravi Mariya as Thalaivar
- Namo Narayana as Idi
- R. K. Suresh as Inspector Hameed
- Manobala as Bhakta
- Mayilsamy as resident
- Mounika Devi as Geetha
- Tamil Selvi as Gayathri, Thalaivar's wife
- Sri Latha as Hari's mother
- Linga as Kidnapper
- Soodhu Kavvum Sivakumar as Kathir's boss
- Citizen Mani
- Kovai Babu as Cash, Ravi's Boss
- Supergood Subramani as Priest Sugapoganandha
- Sumathi G. as lady in the water queue
- Sai Dheena
- George Maryan as Father Leslie Francis
- K. S. G. Venkatesh as Ramya's College H. O. D.
- Winner Ramachandran as Apartment security guard

== Production ==
The film began with a ceremony in November 2016, with Studio Green and Thangam Cinemas revealing that they would be financing a film directed by newcomer Santhosh P. Jayakumar, featuring Gautham Karthik and Nikki Galrani in the lead roles. Titled Hara Hara Mahadevaki, the launch was also attended by Rajendran and Ravi Mariya.

== Soundtrack ==
The songs and background score were composed by Balamurali Balu. Vishal Chandrasekhar was a guest composer for the song "Haiyo Konjam".

Hara Hara Mahadevaki

Soundtrack album by Balamurali Balu
- Released: 11 September 2017
- Recorded: 2017
- Genre: Soundtrack
- Length: 15:52
- Label: Junglee Music
- Producer: Balamurali Balu

Balamurali Balu chronology
Peechankai (2017)	Hara Hara Mahadevaki (2017)	Iruttu Araiyil Murattu Kuththu (2018)

Vishal Chandrasekhar chronology
Kathalo Rajakumari (2017)	Hara Hara Mahadevaki (2017)	Padi Padi Leche Manasu (2018)

Professional ratings
Review scores
Source	Rating
Behindwoods	2.75/5 stars

Tracklist
No.	Title	Lyrics	Music	Artist(s)	Length
1.	"Hara Hara Mahadevaki"	Balamurali Balu; Santhosh P. Jayakumar	Balamurali Balu	Anthony Daasan; Prathi Balasubramanian; Sharmila	3:40
2.	"Aaya Soathula"	Ku Karthik; Santhosh P. Jayakumar	Balamurali Balu	Kavita Thomas; Josh Vivian	1:52
3.	"Bigilu Bigilu"	Ku Karthik; Maranagana Viji	Balamurali Balu	Maranagana Viji	3:56
4.	"Chikku Bukku"	Gaana Kadal	Balamurali Balu	Gaana Kadal	3:01
5.	"Haiyo Konjam"	Gaana Kadal; Santhosh P Jayakumar	Vishal Chandrasekhar	Gaana Kadal; Sinduri Vishal	3:23
Total length:					15:52

== Reception ==
=== Critical reception ===
Srivatsan of India Today wrote "Considering that it's projected as an adult comedy, Hara Hara Mahadevaki could be best described by the word 'masturbatory'. In a more literal sense, the film has many masturbation, cleavage and hand job jokes that leave you angry." Suganth.M of The Times of India wrote "Hara Hara Mahadevaki does stand true to its claim of being an adult comedy film, in the sense that the comedy here involves a few double entendres and sight gags. But take those away, and the film feels no different from the mindless comedies that we have been seeing of late." Anupama Subramaniam of Deccan Chronicle wrote "The movie has the basics needed for the genre: innuendos, ambiguity in the phrases, double entendres, and visual comedy that seems both fated and accidental. But these elements alone don’t make for a complete picture - mindless dialogues and run-of-the-mill content puts this in the same category as most other average Tamil comedies." Ashameera Aiyappan of The Indian Express said "For a movie that has several comedians, Hara Hara Mahadevaki surprisingly fails with humour. The movie which was promoted as an adult comedy is liberally peppered with puns and innuendos."
