= Studio Green =

Indian film studio

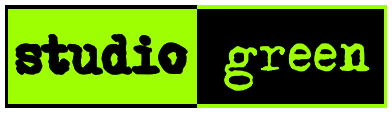
- Company type: Private
- Industry: Entertainment
- Founded: 2006; 20 years ago
- Headquarters: Chennai, Tamil Nadu, India
- Key people: K. E. Gnanavel Raja (owner)
- Products: Film Production; Film Distribution

Studio Green is an Indian film production and distribution company based in Chennai. The company was founded in 2006 by K. E. Gnanavel Raja, relative of actor Sivakumar and many of their films feature his sons Suriya and Karthi. They have produced several Tamil films and also distributed films across India.

== History ==
The company first produced and distributed the film Sillunu Oru Kaadhal starring Suriya, in 2006. Next they distributed Paruthiveeran, introducing Karthik Sivakumar, younger brother of Suriya. It ran for more than a year in screens in Tamil Nadu. Following this success, Singam was produced. The Hari directed action film, starring Suriya, also went on to become highly successful at the box office, emerging as one of the highest-grossing Tamil films of that year. Their following production was Naan Mahaan Alla starring Karthi and Kajal Agarwal which also became a commercial success. Their next production was Siruthai starring Karthi and Tamannaah Bhatia, which released on 14 January 2011, coinciding with the Pongal festival and turned out to be another milestone in his career. Simultaneously, they distributed Yamudu, the dubbed Telugu version of Singam and Aawara, that of Paiyaa, in Andhra Pradesh. The former managed to run for 50 days in screens all over the state while Aawara also received good response and ran more than 100 days.

Studio Green distributed the Karthi starrer film, Saguni in 2012. They also started venturing into small scale films in the same year by purchasing and distributing Attakathi and Kumki. Its first production in 2013, Alex Pandian starring Karthi opened to negative reviews while the first distribution Kedi Billa Killadi Ranga was a commercial success. They also distributed Soodhu Kavvum which opened to highly positive critical reaction. The studio produced another film starring Karthi, All in All Azhagu Raja directed by M. Rajesh. The film was released in November and attracted negative reviews. It failed to emulate the success of the director's previous films.

== Filmography ==
=== Production ===
Year	Title	Cast	Director	Notes	Refs
2006	Sillunu Oru Kaadhal	Suriya, Jyothika, Bhoomika Chawla	N. Krishna		
2007	Paruthiveeran	Karthi, Priyamani	Ameer	Filmfare Award for Best Film – Tamil; Vijay Award for Best Film; Nominated – Vijay Award for Favourite Film	
2010	Singam	Suriya, Anushka Shetty	Hari	Vijay Award for Entertainer of the Year	
2010	Naan Mahaan Alla	Karthi, Kajal Aggarwal	Suseenthiran	Nominated – Vijay Award for Favourite Film	
2011	Siruthai	Karthi, Tamannaah	Siva	Nominated – Vijay Award for Favourite Film	
2013	Alex Pandian	Karthi, Anushka Shetty	Suraj		
2013	All in All Azhagu Raja	Karthi, Kajal Aggarwal	M. Rajesh		
2013	Biriyani	Karthi, Hansika Motwani	Venkat Prabhu		
2014	Madras	Karthi, Catherine Tresa	Pa. Ranjith	Filmfare Critics Award for Best Actor – South	
2015	Darling	G. V. Prakash Kumar, Nikki Galrani	Sam Anton		
2015	Komban	Karthi, Lakshmi Menon	M. Muthaiah		
2015	Massu Engira Masilamani	Suriya, Nayantara, Pranitha Subhash	Venkat Prabhu		
2015	Indru Netru Naalai	Vishnu Vishal, Miya, Karunakaran	R. Ravikumar		
2016	Kadhalum Kadandhu Pogum	Vijay Sethupathi, Madonna Sebastian	Nalan Kumarasamy		
2016	Darling 2	Kalaiyarasan, Rameez Raja, Kaali Venkat, Ramdoss	Sathish Chandrasekaran		
2016	Iraivi	S. J. Surya, Vijay Sethupathi, Bobby Simha, Anjali	Karthik Subbaraj		
2017	Si3	Suriya, Shruti Haasan, Anushka Shetty	Hari		
2018	Thaanaa Serndha Koottam	Suriya, Keerthy Suresh, Ramya Krishnan	Vignesh Shivan		
2018	Ghajinikanth	Arya, Sayyeshaa	Santhosh P. Jayakumar		
2018	NOTA	Vijay Devarakonda, Mehreen Pirzada, Sathyaraj, Nassar	Anand Shankar		
2019	Mehandi Circus	Madhampatty Rangaraj, Shweta Tripathi, Vela Ramamoorthy	Raju Saravanan		
2019	Devarattam	Gautham Karthik, Manjima Mohan	M. Muthaiah		
2019	Mr. Local	Sivakarthikeyan, Nayanthara	M. Rajesh		
2019	Magamuni	Arya, Mahima Nambiar, Indhuja Ravichandran	Santhakumar		
2021	Teddy	Arya, Sayyeshaa	Shakti Soundar Rajan	25th film	
2022	Theal	Prabhu Deva, Samyuktha Hegde	Harikumar		
2022	Kaatteri	Vaibhav, Sonam Bajwa, Aathmika	Deekay		
2023	Pathu Thala	Silambarasan, Gautham Karthik	N. Krishna		
2023	80s Buildup	Santhanam, Radhika Preethi	Kalyaan		
2024	Rebel	G. V. Prakash Kumar, Mamitha Baiju	Nikesh RS		
2024	Buddy	Allu Sirish, Gayatri Bhardwaj, Ajmal Ameer	Sam Anton		
2024	Thangalaan	Vikram, Parvathy Thiruvothu, Malavika Mohanan	Pa. Ranjith		
2024	Kanguva	Suriya, Disha Patani	Siva		
2026	Vaa Vaathiyaar	Karthi, Krithi Shetty	Nalan Kumarasamy		

=== Distribution ===
Year	Title	Cast/Crew	Language	Notes	Refs
2007	Nuvvu Nenu Prema	Suriya, Jyothika, Bhumika Chawla	Telugu	Dubbed version of Sillunu Oru Kaadhal	
2010	Yuganiki Okkadu	Karthi, Reema Sen, Andrea Jeremiah	Telugu	Dubbed version of Aayirathil Oruvan	
2010	Aawara	Karthi, Tamannaah, Milind Soman	Telugu	Dubbed version of Paiyaa	
2010	Yamudu	Suriya, Anushka Shetty, Prakash Raj	Telugu	Dubbed version of Singam	
2011	Naa Peru Shiva	Karthi, Kajal Aggarwal, Jayaprakash	Telugu	Dubbed version of Naan Mahaan Alla	
2012	Saguni	Karthi, Pranitha	Tamil		
2012	Attakathi	Attakathi Dinesh, Nandita Swetha	Tamil		
2012	Kumki	Vikram Prabhu, Lakshmi Menon	Tamil		
2013	Kedi Billa Killadi Ranga	Vimal, Sivakarthikeyan, Bindu Madhavi, Regina Cassandra	Tamil		
2013	Soodhu Kavvum	Vijay Sethupathi, Sanchita Shetty	Tamil		
2013	Yamudu II	Suriya, Anushka Shetty, Hansika Motwani	Telugu	Dubbed version of Singam II	
2013	Pizza II: Villa	Ashok Selvan, Sanchita Shetty	Tamil		
2014	Vallavanukku Pullum Aayudham	Santhanam, Ashna Zaveri	Tamil		
2015	O Kadhal Kanmani	Mani Ratnam, A. R. Rahman, Dulquer Salmaan, Nithya Menen	Tamil		
2015	36 Vayathinile	Rosshan Andrrews, Jyothika, Rahman	Tamil		
2015	Uttama Villain	Kamal Haasan, K.Balachander, Ramesh Aravind, Urvashi, Andrea Jeremiah, Pooja Kumar, Parvathi Menon, Parvathy Nair	Tamil		
2015	Baahubali: The Beginning	Prabhas, Rana Daggubati, Anushka Shetty, Tamannaah	Tamil		
2015	Trisha Illana Nayanthara	Adhik Ravichandran, G. V. Prakash Kumar, Anandhi, Manisha Yadav, Simran	Tamil		
2015	Pasanga 2: Haiku	Nishesh, Vaishnavi, Suriya, Amala Paul	Tamil		
2016	24	Suriya, Samantha Ruth Prabhu, Nithya Menen, Vikram Kumar	Tamil		
2017	Hara Hara Mahadevaki	Gautham Karthik, Nikki Galrani	Tamil		
2018	Bhaagamathie	Anushka Shetty, Unni Mukundan, Jayaram, Asha Sarath, Murali Sharma	Telugu & Tamil		
2018	Iruttu Araiyil Murattu Kuththu	Gautham Karthik, Vaibhavi Shandilya	Tamil		
2019	Mr. Local	Siva Karthikeyan, Nayanthara	Tamil		
2022	Kaatteri	Vaibhav Reddy, Varalaxmi Sarathkumar, Sonam Bajwa	Tamil		
2022	Onai	Varun Dhawan, Kriti Sanon	Tamil	Dubbed version of Bhediya	
2025	Baahubali: The Epic	Prabhas, Anushka Shetty, Tamannaah			
