= Balamurali Balu =

Indian film composer

- Born: July 16; Chennai, Tamil Nadu, India
- Occupations: Music director lyricist music producer
- Years active: 2012–present

Balamurali Balu is an Indian film music director and lyricist who has worked predominantly in the Tamil film industry. His first movie was Madhiyal Vell and composed music for Pallu Padama Paathuka. Subsequently, he composed music for Peechankai. This critically acclaimed film was Balu's debut as a composer. He was praised for "adding the quirkiness" to the music aligning with the theme of the movie's script.

== Early life ==
Balu is a professional music composer in South India. He has also worked as a music director and a film score composer. Balu was born on the 16th of July and was raised in Chennai in Tamil Nadu, India. Prior to his music career, Balu completed his PhD from Georgia Tech in chemical engineering in 2009 and worked as a Process Engineer with Intel Technologies. He is also an alumni from the Berklee College of Music. He entered the music industry through Tamil cinema since 2016.

== Career ==
In 2012, he worked on the short film Tamil Ini. In 2017, Balu got his first chance in the Tamil film industry when he was offered an opportunity to score music for the movie Peechankai. The music was well-received and appreciated for adding value to the quirkiness of the script. He won the Best Music Producer Award in the Regional Film Category at the Indian Recording Artists Association Awards 2018 for the movie.

In 2018, Balu joined hands with director Santhosh P. Jayakumar to score music for the film Hara Hara Mahadevaki, which starred Gautham Karthik. The music created a lot of attention, especially with the title song "Hara Hara Mahadevaki" becoming a viral hit. With the success of Hara Hara Mahadevaki, Balu continued with Iruttu Araiyil Murattu Kuththu, his second collaboration with Jayakumar and Gautham Karthik. He later composed the biographical film Traffic Ramasamy, based on the life of activist Traffic Ramaswamy. Afterwards, Balu collaborated with Jayakumar for the third time with the Arya-starrer Ghajinikanth, a remake of the Telugu film Bhale Bhale Magadivoy.

In 2019, Balu composed music for Chikati Gadilo Chithakotudu, the Telugu remake of Iruttu Araiyil Murattu Kuththu, which marked his Telugu film debut. In 2022, Balu produced the soundtrack for Kuthukku Pathu, a comedy-drama web series.

== Discography ==
=== Films ===
Year	Film title (Tamil)	Language	Notes
2016	Madhiyal Vell	Tamil	Unreleased film
2016	Thagadu Thagadu	Tamil	Unreleased film
2017	Peechankai	Tamil	Best Music Producer (IRAA Awards - 2018)
2017	Hara Hara Mahadevaki	Tamil	
2018	Iruttu Araiyil Murattu Kuththu	Tamil	
2018	Traffic Ramasamy	Tamil	
2018	Ghajinikanth	Tamil	
2019	Chikati Gadilo Chithakotudu	Telugu	
2020	Thatrom Thookrom	Tamil	
2023	Pallu Padama Paathuka	Tamil	
2024	Chiclets	Tamil Telugu	
2024	Amigo Garage	Tamil	
TBA	Nabika	Malayalam	Upcoming

=== Television ===
Year	Series	Language	Notes
2022	Kuthukku Pathu	Tamil	Released on Aha

=== Albums ===
Balu has collaborated with Lady Kash as a music producer in her albums Rap Smash and Villupaattu.
