= Kuthukku Pathu =

Web series directed by Vijay Varadharaj

- Original title: குத்துக்கு பத்து
- Genre: Comedy; Drama
- Directed by: Vijay Varadharaj
- Starring: Shah Ra; Vijay Varadharaj; Abdool Lee; Samyuktha; Bose Venkat; Aadukalam Naren
- Music by: Balamurali Balu
- Country of origin: India
- Original language: Tamil
- No. of seasons: 1
- No. of episodes: 7

Production
- Producer: AKV Durai
- Cinematography: Jagdeesh Ravichandran
- Editor: Shanthosh Senthil
- Running time: 22-32 minutes
- Production company: D Company

Original release
- Network: Aha Tamil
- Release: 13 May 2022

Kuthukku Pathu (transl. fight for a fight) is an Indian Tamil-language Comedy Drama web series produced as an original for Aha Tamil, directed by Vijay Varadharaj. Produced by D Company the series stars Shah Ra, Vijay Varadharaj, Abdool Lee, Samyuktha, Bose Venkat and Aadukalam Naren. The series comprised seven episodes and was released on Aha Tamil on 13 May 2022.

== Cast ==
- Shah Ra
- Vijay Varadharaj as Rangabashyam
- Abdool Lee as Tarantino
- Samyuktha
- Bose Venkat
- Aadukalam Naren
- R. Badree as Fakir
- Augustin as Medavakkam Augustin
- Sengi Velu
- Divagar
- Dhileepan

== Episodes ==
| No. | Title | Directed by | Written by | Original release date |
|---|---|---|---|---|
| 1 | "Thulluvatho Ilamai" | Vijay Varadharaj | Unknown | 13 May 2022 |
| 2 | "Rangasthalam" | Vijay Varadharaj | Unknown | 13 May 2022 |
| 3 | "Onnaaiyum Attukuttiyum" | Vijay Varadharaj | Unknown | 13 May 2022 |
| 4 | "Mandri Madiyil Sundari" | Vijay Varadharaj | Unknown | 13 May 2022 |
| 5 | "Payum Puli Pathungum Nagam" | Vijay Varadharaj | Unknown | 13 May 2022 |
| 6 | "Nadunisi Naaigal" | Vijay Varadharaj | Unknown | 13 May 2022 |
| 7 | "Mirattal Adi" | Vijay Varadharaj | Unknown | 13 May 2022 |
