= Irandam Kuththu =

2020 film directed by santhosh.p.jayakumar

- Theatrical release poster
- Directed by: Santhosh P. Jayakumar
- Produced by: S. Hari Bhaskaran
- Starring: Santhosh P. Jayakumar; Daniel Annie Pope; Meenal Sahu; Akrithi Singh
- Cinematography: Ballu
- Edited by: Prasanna G. K.
- Music by: S. N. Prasad; Dharan Kumar
- Production company: Flying Horse Pictures
- Distributed by: Rockfort Entertainment
- Release date: 14 November 2020
- Running time: 120 minutes
- Country: India
- Language: Tamil

Irandam Kuththu (transl. Second punch) is a 2020 Indian Tamil-language adult horror comedy film, written and directed by Santhosh P. Jayakumar who stars alongside Daniel Annie Pope, Meenal Sahu and Akrithi Singh. A spiritual successor Santhosh's Iruttu Araiyil Murattu Kuththu (2018), the film was released in theatres on 14 November 2020.

== Plot ==
Veera and Vasu are two friends who have been mistaken for gay men all their lives, marry two girls, and go to a resort in Bangkok for their honeymoons, where a horny ghost won't let them be in peace until they satisfy it sexually.

== Cast ==
- Santhosh P. Jayakumar as Veera
- Daniel Annie Pope as Vasu
- Akrithi Singh as Priya, Vasu's wife
- Meenal Sahu as the Ghost
- Rajendran as Swamiji
- Ravi Mariya as Dr. Thambidurai
- Chaams as Ram
- Shalu Shamu as "Matter" Mona
- TSK as Vimal
- Singampuli as Priya's father
- Swaminathan as Pooja's father
- K. S. G. Venkatesh as Veera's father
- Saravana Sakthi as Vasu's father
- Reethika Ashok Kumar as Kiran
- Rekha Suresh as Veera's mother
- Senthi Kumari as Padma, Pooja's mother
- Jayanthy Mala as Vasu's mother
- Manimegalai as Priya's mother
- Lollu Sabha Manohar as Ghost
- Rahul Thatha as Ghost
- Thalapathy Dinesh as Ghost
- Kayal Devaraj as Swamy’s assistant
- Balaji as Ghost’s husband
- Tiger Garden Thangadurai as Teacher
- Vani Shree as herself (cameo appearance)
- Sathish Krishnan in a special appearance

== Production ==
Director Santhosh P. Jayakumar announced plans to make a sequel to his earlier Iruttu Araiyil Murattu Kuththu (2018) in October 2019, after his other project, Pulanaivu featuring Arvind Swami, had an extended production break. Santhosh opted to star in the film himself, after other actors expressed their reluctance to be a part of the project. He shed 18 kilograms (40 lb) for his role. The film was shot in late 2019 and early 2020 in locations across Huinan County in China, Bangkok and Chennai. The title of the film was confirmed to be Irandam Kuththu in September 2020.

== Music ==
The soundtrack was composed by S. N. Prasad.

Track listing
No.	Title	Lyrics	Singer(s)	Length
1.	"Thambi"	Srikanth Vardhan	S. N. Prasad	2:00
2.	"Veera Da Veera"	Srikanth Vardhan	Bhavana Balakrishnan	2:48
3.	"Thabela"	Ku Karthik	Diwakar, Vishnupriya Ravi	3:12
4.	"Boom Boom"	Srikanth Vardhan	S. N. Prasad	2:37
5.	"Virginity"	Srikanth Vardhan	Ramya NSK, Benny Dayal	2:58

== Marketing ==
Following the release of the film's official trailer in October 2020, director Bharathiraja criticised the visuals and theme of the film in an open letter. In reply, Santhosh called out the director for being hypocritical citing examples of glamorous stills from Bharathiraja's Tik Tik Tik (1981) before revoking his response and apologising.

A public interest litigation petition was sought to stop the release of the film, citing the film was propagating vulgarity, obscenity and pornography. while the media promotions were being misused for the purpose of commercial benefit. As a result, although the film was allowed to release, the Madurai Bench of Madras High Court ordered the producers to remove the teaser and trailer from YouTube.

== Release ==
Irandam Kuththu was released on 14 November 2020 during the week of Diwali across theatres in Tamil Nadu, becoming the first theatrical Tamil release in over eight months owing to the COVID-19 pandemic. Prior to the release, barring the legal dispute on the film's adult content, it also faced potential delays as result of a dispute between the Tamil Film Active Producers Association (TFAPA) and Qube, a digital service provider. Likewise, as a result of a decision by newspapers to increase advertising, the makers opted to promote the film through online and physical posters only.

== Reception ==
M Suganth from The Times of India gave the film one star out of five, noting "if the plot follows the template set by the first film, everything else sinks to lower depths than what we witnessed in that one." Gopinath Rajendran from Cinema Express gave the film the same score, noting "Irandam Kuththu lacks the necessary horror or the comedy elements and resorts to sexual innuendos as the only weapon to tickle your funny bones", concluding it was "a hideously unfunny and unoriginal fiasco". Sify also gave the film one star, writing the film was "a below average adult horror-comedy". Karthik Keramalu of Film Companion, wrote, "The sex comedy [...] is a bore-fest in three tragic acts."
