= Devarattam =

2019 Indian action drama film by M. Muthaiah

- Film poster
- Directed by: M. Muthaiah
- Written by: M. Muthaiah
- Produced by: K. E. Gnanavel Raja
- Starring: Gautham Karthik; Manjima Mohan; Vinodhini Vaidyanathan; Soori; FEFSI Vijayan
- Cinematography: Sakthi Saravanan
- Edited by: Praveen K. L.
- Music by: Nivas K. Prasanna
- Production company: Studio Green
- Release date: 1 May 2019
- Running time: 130 minutes
- Country: India
- Language: Tamil
- Box office: (1 week collection)

Devarattam (lit. 'Dance of the Gods'; transl. Bharatanatyam) is a 2019 Indian Tamil-language action drama film directed by M. Muthaiah and produced by K. E. Gnanavel Raja. The film stars Gautham Karthik and Manjima Mohan in the lead roles, while Vinodhini Vaidyanathan, Soori and FEFSI Vijayan play supporting roles. The soundtrack was composed by Nivas K. Prasanna, while the cinematography and editing were done by Sakthi Saravanan and Praveen K. L.

Devarattam was released on 1 May 2019 on May Day, where it received negative reviews from critics but became a commercial hit at the box office.

== Plot ==
Past: In the 1980s, Kodumpavi Ganesan, a dreaded ruffian in Madurai, did an adoption ritual for his baby boy with Kalyani Thevar and his pregnant wife, who have six girls. Because of the death of his previous children either a miscarriage or stillborn. His wife goes into labour and gives birth to a baby boy, while Kalyani Thevar's daughter goes into labour and delivers a baby girl. One day, after a heated argument with Kodumpavi Ganesan over a money lending dispute where Ganesan demanded a compound interest with the person from the Kalyani Thevar side despite paid all the interests. Ganesan refuses to return the documents and threatens to kill anyone refusing a compromise. Kalyani Thevar threatens him and warns him that he would be beheaded if he refuses to return the documents. An insulted and infuriated Ganesan stabs Kalyani Thevar and slits his throat, killing him.

Present: Vetri, Kalyani Thevar's son, lives in a casteist-pride (devar) joint family with his six sisters and their husbands. Vetri's eldest sister, Pechi, and her husband nurtured Vetri. His relationship with Pechi is more like that of a mother and son. Vetri is a lawyer. He has anger issues and gets into unnecessary fights. However, his family loves him as he is the first advocate in their family. At the court, Vetri and his family witness Kodumpavi Ganesan stabbing and murdering a guy called Veeran. Veeran threatened to kill Deivam, the son of Kodumpavi Ganesan. Vetri is upset that he could not do anything when Ganesan murdered Veeran in court. His brothers-in-law advise him not to get angry for the sake of his family. Pechi's husband tells Vetri about his father's murder and how his mother died after Kalyani Thevar's death. Pechi and her husband are worried that Vetri might end up like his father.

At a shopping mall, Munna downblouses girls on the escalator and sexually harasses a girl, who is Vetri's niece. The girl's friend, Vanitha, slaps Munna, so Munna kidnaps Vanitha. Meanwhile, Vetri falls in love with Madhu, and she reciprocates his love. At the M.G.R. bus stand, Vanitha hugs random people, and Madhu and her friends see her. Later, Vanitha's father sees his daughter and laments over her state. On the news, Munna is labelled a sexual offender for assaulting Vanitha, so Munna and his father meet with Deivam to offer protection to Munna. Deivam and Kaalaiyan, Ganesan's right-hand man, discuss with a police inspector to persuade him to drop the case, but the inspector refuses. Madhu and Vanitha's father meet the police inspector. However, the inspector explains that he cannot help, so they meet Vetri. Vanitha's father explains to Vetri what happened to his daughter.

Vanitha pleads with Munna, but Munna takes her to a warehouse, where she gets drugged and gang-raped by different men. He beats up Munna and Deivam's men and threatens Deivam. The following day, Vetri tries to meet with Vanitha's parents to take them to court. Suddenly, Munna, Deivam, and his men run over and kill Vanitha's parents. Before dying, Vanitha's father tells Vetri not to spare them. Deivam tries to kill Vetri, but Vetri murders Deivam and Munna brutally. While Ganesan is away from the village, he gets informed about Deivam's death.

Ganesan then shaves his head and beard and carries out his son's funeral rites. The police take Vetri to Ganesan's house. Ganesan swears revenge and promises to kill Vetri just like he murdered Deivam in the streets of Madurai in broad daylight. Vetri gets sent to Madurai Central Prison. Vetri's family gets emotional after seeing Vetri in jail. Munna's father pays assassins to kill Vetri, but Vetri fights them off. Ganesan hears about Vetri's murder attempt in prison, kills Munna's father, and dumps his body in front of Vetri's house.

Vetri gets released from prison, and Vetri's family persuades him to go to Kodaikanal. Meanwhile, Ganesan's goons search for him. One day, Ganesan calls Vetri from his uncle's phone and sends a video of Ganesan's goons chasing Pechi's husband and Pechi. Ganesan then kills Pechi and her husband brutally. Ganesan then calls for Vetri to return, or he will kill other family members.

Vetri and his family are deeply saddened and mourn Pechi and her husband's deaths. Vetri's brothers-in-law tell him not to spare Ganesan. Vetri then tells his brother-in-law to get some water from the fridge and gets shocked at seeing something. The film reveals that Vetri beat Ganesan's goons and beheaded Ganesan, then placed his head inside the refrigerator before Pechi and her husband's funeral. A few months later, Vanitha get married, and Vanitha looks at Vetri and sees her dad's soul crying and the film ends.

== Cast ==
- Gautham Karthik as Vetri, a criminal lawyer
- Manjima Mohan as Madhu, Vetri's love interest
- Soori as Vetri's 4th brother-in-law
- FEFSI Vijayan as Kodumpavi Ganesan, a dreaded gangster
- Vinodhini Vaidyanathan as Pechi, Vetri's 1st sister
- Bose Venkat as Vetri's 1st brother-in-law
- Saravana Sakthi as Vetri's 2nd brother-in-law
- Aaru Bala as Vetri's 3rd brother-in-law
- Vijayakumar as Vetri's 5th brother-in-law
- Munish Raja as Vetri's 6th brother-in-law
- Akalya Venkatesan as Vetri's 4th sister
- Kannika Ravi as Vanitha, a gang rape victim
- Shenbagam as Vetri's sister
- Sindhu as Vetri's sister
- Saranya as Vetri's sister
- Akila as Vetri's sister
- Vela Ramamoorthy as Kalyani Thevar, Vetri's father
- G. Gnanasambandam as Bojarajan, a senior lawyer
- Chandru Sujan as Deivam, Ganesan's adopted son
- Veeran Selvarajan as Veeran
- Hello Kandasamy as Vanitha's father
- Ragu Aditya as Munna
- TSR as a judge

== Soundtrack ==
This film's soundtrack is composed by Nivas K. Prasanna with lyrics written by Yugabharathi, Magizh Thirumeni, Vivek, and Pa. Vijay

Devarattam

Soundtrack album by Nivas K. Prasanna
- Released: 2019
- Genre: Feature film soundtrack
- Length: 21:00
- Language: Tamil
- Label: Divo
- Producer: Nivas K. Prasanna

Nivas K. Prasanna chronology
Kootathil Oruthan (2016)	Devarattam (2019)	Hippi (2019)

Track listing
No.	Title	Lyrics	Singer(s)	Length
1.	"Madura Palapalakkudhu"	Yugabharathi	Nivas K. Prasanna, Vijay Sethupathi, Priyanka Deshpande, Niranjana Ramanan	3:19
2.	"Pasampukalli"	Vivek	Nivas K. Prasanna, Vijay Antony, Alex Samuel Jenito	1:41
3.	"Enga Attam"	Pa. Vijay	Nivas K. Prasanna	3:02
4.	"Azhagaru Vaaraaru"	Pa. Vijay	V. M. Mahalingam	2:58
5.	"Lesa Lesa"	Vivek	Chinmayi	4:05
6.	"Aaatha Thottille"	Yugabharathi	Nivas K. Prasanna
7.	"Ulaagam Unna Vittu"	Magizh Thirumeni	Vijay Yesudas	1:55
8.	"Madura Palapalakkudhu (Karaoke)"		Nivas K. Prasanna	2:00
9.	"Pasampukalli (Karaoke)"	-	Nivas K. Prasanna	2:00
Total length:				21:00

== Critical reception ==
Srivatsan.S of The Hindu wrote "It isn't a coincidence that Devarattam released on May Day. After sitting through the film, one is bound to say, “Mayday, mayday.”" Sreedhar Pillai of Firstpost gave 2.5 out of 5 stars and wrote "In the end, Devarattam seems like just another film which shows Madurai as a traditional land that is also a blood-soaked, lawless place where cops and gangsters are hand in glove." Karthik Kumar of Hindustan Times gave 2.5 out of 5 stars and wrote "If you are interested in a generic rural masala entertainer but one that has great action, then this Gautham Karthik starrer could be a film for you." Sudhir Sreenivasan of Cinema Express gave 2 out of 5 stars and wrote "The film, ostensibly mounted on Thevar pride, makes the sort of association with violence we have generally been used to seeing in such movies"

Janani. K of India Today gave 1.5 out of 5 stars and wrote "Director Muthaiah's films follow the same template. So much so, that you can guess the story even before you have seen the film. Devarattam is the same: a cliched rural entertainer. Skip Devarattam at ease." Subhakeerthana. S of The Indian Express gave 1.5 out of 5 stars and wrote "M. Muthaiah directorial Devarattam, starring Gautham Karthik and Manjima Mohan, is too generic and doesn’t break any new ground." Anjana Shekar of The News Minute gave 1 out of 5 stars and wrote "Muthiah seems to be convinced that cape-wearing superheroes who will not flinch to break bones or behead criminals for the sake of "protecting" women are the answer to all sexual crimes."

== Box office ==
The film earned Rs 6.5 crore in its opening weekend.
