= K. E. Gnanavel Raja =

Indian film producer (born 1977)

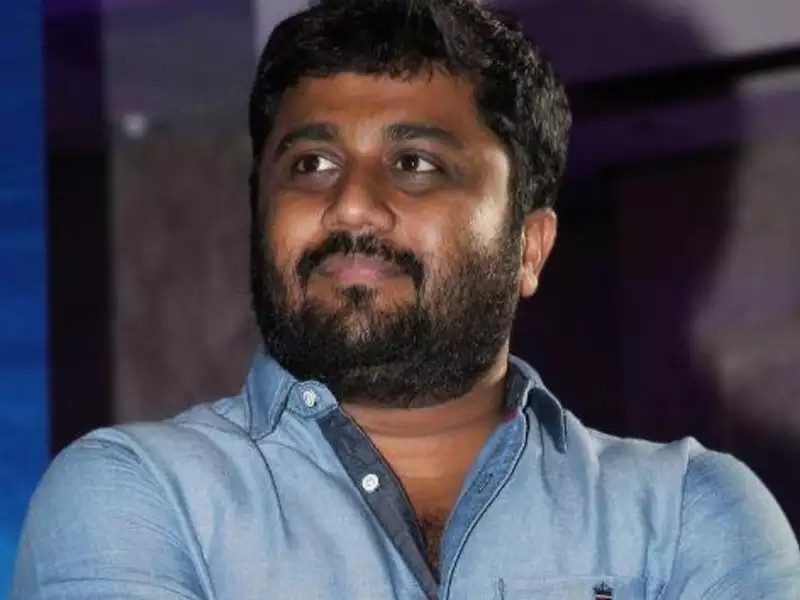
- Born: Madras, Tamil Nadu, India
- Occupation: Film producer
- Years active: 2006–present
- Organization: Studio Green
- Spouse: Neha Gnanavelraja

K. E. Gnanavel Raja is an Indian film producer from Tamil Nadu, India. He began his career by producing and distributing films starring Suriya and Karthi, before branching out to own two studios — Studio Green and Aadnah Arts.

== Personal life ==
Gnanavel Raja is married to Neha Gnanavel.

== Career ==
Gnanavel Raja nurtured an interest in becoming a film producer since his childhood, and revealed that he would regularly skip classes from his school days at St. Bede's Anglo Indian Higher Secondary School, Chennai to watch film screenings at the nearby Devi or Sathyam cinema halls. Gnanavel Raja is also distantly related to actor Sivakumar's family, though has often been labelled by the media as the cousin of Sivakumar's sons Suriya and Karthi.

After founding Studio Green, he entered the production business by producing Sillunu Oru Kaadhal (2006) starring Suriya in the lead role, and then solely collaborated with the actor and his brother Karthi as a producer or distributor for several of their films until 2012. Several of the studio's films including Paruthiveeran (2007), Singam (2010) and Naan Mahaan Alla (2010) were profitable, while dubbed releases of the films in Andhra Pradesh also helped the market of the two actors amongst Telugu-speaking audiences. His first success as a distributor for another actor's films was through Attakathi (2012), and he subsequently enjoyed further success from the distribution of Kumki (2012) and Soodhu Kavvum (2013).

Despite minor setbacks through the commercial failures of Alex Pandian (2013) and All in All Azhagu Raja (2013), Gnanavel Raja experienced success with small-budget productions such as Pa. Ranjith's Madras (2014), Indru Netru Naalai (2015) and Kadhalum Kadandhu Pogum (2016). Likewise distribution deals secured for O Kadhal Kanmani (2015), 36 Vayathinile (2015) and Trisha Illana Nayanthara (2015) also proved to be profitable. Other setbacks came in the form of the release deal for Uttama Villain (2015) and during the release of Komban (2015), where protesters claimed that the story revolved around animosity between different caste groups and that it therefore had the potential to incite violence in southern districts of Tamil Nadu.

During 2016, Gnanavel Raja became involved in a series of clashes with other filmmakers, effectively raising his profile as an individual in the film industry. In May 2016, he was briefly on a hunger strike protesting against the effects of piracy on his latest release, 24 (2016). The following month he called for a ban on future films by Karthik Subbaraj citing that the director had overshot the budget for Iraivi (2016) and that the film had shown producers in negative light. He later called out actor Sivakarthikeyan for failing to honour an acting commitment he had to Studio Green.

In early 2017, Gnanavel Raja criticised the existing Tamil Film Producers Council for failing to adequately tackle piracy, before successfully getting himself elected to the board as the Secretary. He resigned seven months later, hoping to become the President of Chennai Kanchipuram Thiruvallur District Film Distributors Association, but was eventually unsuccessful. In a press conference in late 2017, he indirectly criticised actors Silambarasan, Trisha and Vadivelu for giving film producers a difficult time.

Alongside Studio Green, he later set up Aadnah Arts and Blue Ghost Pictures.

== Companies ==
- Studio Green (2006—present)
- Aadnah Arts / Blue Ghost Pictures (2017— 23/07/2021)

== Filmography ==
=== Production ===
Year	Title	Cast	Director	Notes
2006	Sillunu Oru Kaadhal	Suriya, Jyothika, Bhoomika Chawla	N. Krishna	
2010	Singam	Suriya, Anushka Shetty	Hari	Vijay Award for Entertainer of the Year
2010	Naan Mahaan Alla	Karthi, Kajal Aggarwal	Suseenthiran	Nominated – Vijay Award for Favourite Film
2011	Siruthai	Karthi, Tamannaah Bhatia	Siva	Nominated – Vijay Award for Favourite Film
2013	Alex Pandian	Karthi, Anushka Shetty	Suraj	
2013	All in All Azhagu Raja	Karthi, Kajal Aggarwal	M. Rajesh	
2013	Biriyani	Karthi, Hansika Motwani	Venkat Prabhu	
2014	Madras	Karthi, Catherine Tresa	Pa. Ranjith	
2015	Darling	G. V. Prakash Kumar, Nikki Galrani	Sam Anton	
2015	Komban	Karthi, Lakshmi Menon	M. Muthaiah	
2015	Massu Engira Masilamani	Suriya, Nayantara, Pranitha Subhash	Venkat Prabhu	
2015	Indru Netru Naalai	Vishnu Vishal, Miya George, Karunakaran	R. Ravikumar	
2016	Kadhalum Kadandhu Pogum	Vijay Sethupathi, Madonna Sebastian	Nalan Kumarasamy	
2016	Iraivi	S. J. Surya, Vijay Sethupathi, Bobby Simha, Anjali	Karthik Subbaraj	
2016	Darling 2	Kalaiyarasan, Rameez Raja, Kaali Venkat, Ramdoss	Sathish Chandrasekaran	
2017	Si3	Suriya, Shruti Haasan, Anushka Shetty	Hari	
2018	Thaanaa Serndha Koottam	Suriya, Keerthy Suresh, Ramya Krishnan	Vignesh Shivan	
2018	Iruttu Araiyil Murattu Kuththu	Gautham Ram Karthik, Vaibhavi Shandilya, Yashika Aannand	Santhosh P. Jayakumar	
2018	Ghajinikanth	Arya, Sayyeshaa	Santhosh P. Jayakumar	
2018	NOTA	Vijay Devarakonda, Mehreen Pirzada, Sathyaraj, Nassar	Anand Shankar	
2019	Mehandi Circus	Madhampatty Rangaraj, Shweta Tripathi, Vela Ramamoorthy	Raju Saravanan	
2019	Devarattam	Gautham Ram Karthik, Manjima Mohan, Soori	M. Muthaiah	
2019	Mr. Local	Sivakarthikeyan, Nayanthara	M. Rajesh	
2019	Magamuni	Arya, Indhuja Ravichandran, Mahima Nambiar	Santhakumar	
2021	Teddy	Arya, Sayyeshaa	Shakti Soundar Rajan	
2022	Theal	Prabhu Deva, Samyuktha Hegde	Harikumar	
2022	Kaatteri	Vaibhav Reddy, Sonam Bajwa, Aathmika, Varalaxmi Sarathkumar	Deekay	
2023	Pathu Thala	Silambarasan, Gautham Karthik, Gautham Vasudev Menon	Obeli N. Krishna	
2023	80s Buildup	Santhanam, Radhika Preethi, R. Sundarrajan, K. S. Ravikumar	Kalyaan	
2024	Rebel	G. V. Prakash Kumar, Mamitha Baiju	Nikesh RS	
2024	Buddy	Allu Sirish, Gayatri Bhardwaj, Mukesh Rishi	Sam Anton	
2024	Thangalaan	Chiyaan Vikram, Parvathy Thiruvothu, Malavika Mohanan, Pasupathy	Pa. Ranjith	
2024	Kanguva	Suriya, Disha Patani	Siva	
2025	Vaa Vaathiyaar	Karthi, Krithi Shetty	Nalan Kumaraswamy	
