= Kaatteri =

2022 film directed by Deekay

- Theatrical release poster
- Directed by: Deekay
- Written by: Deekay
- Produced by: K. E. Gnanavel Raja; S. R. Prabhu
- Starring: Vaibhav; Sonam Bajwa; Varalaxmi Sarathkumar; Aathmika
- Cinematography: Vignesh Vasu
- Edited by: Praveen K. L.
- Music by: S. N. Prasad
- Production company: Studio Green
- Distributed by: Dream Warrior Pictures
- Release date: 5 August 2022
- Country: India
- Language: Tamil

Kaatteri (transl. Forest Vampire, and also spelled Katteri) is a 2022 Indian Tamil-language comedy horror film written and directed by Deekay and produced by K. E. Gnanavel Raja under his production banner Studio Green. The film stars Vaibhav, Sonam Bajwa, Varalaxmi Sarathkumar and Aathmika, while Karunakaran, Ravi Mariya, and Kutty Gopi play supporting roles. The film's music is composed by S. N. Prasad with editing by Praveen K. L. and cinematography by Vignesh Vasu. The film released theatrically on 5 August 2022 and was a box-office bomb.

== Plot ==
The film begins with a 1968 local village festival. One person cuts an electric post, another person comes and pushes down the post, and the electric wire rips all of the village people.

The film cuts to 2019. Gajja, Kaliyurunda, and Sankar, a group of kidnappers, kidnap Kamini and bring her to Naina. Naina orders his henchmen to kill the kidnappers so they cannot tell anyone about it. The kidnappers escape from the henchmen, come to Kiran's first night room, and tell them about the kidnap and Naina's plan to ask for a huge ransom from Kamini's family. Kiran's wife Shwetha instructs them to kidnap Kamini from the henchmen and demand a large ransom.

As per her instruction, Kiran and his friends kidnap Kamini and ask her about Maanga Mani. Kamini tells them about him. He was taking a treatment from her, and a few weeks ago, he said he was about to go on a treasure hunt for gold. Shwetha finds Maanga Mani's location by entering his number on Truecaller. They went to the same location that was shown on Truecaller. The village's name is Kolaatipuram. When they enter the village, the behavior of the villagers is weird, and they realize that the villagers are ghosts. They are the people who died in 1968. After knowing that the villagers are ghosts, they try to elope from the village, but they cannot escape from there. Wherever they run, they end up in the festival area. Kamini tells them that Sankar was taken by a ghost, Mathamma, who asked her, "Am I beautiful?"

Shwetha instructs them to meet Maathamma and correctly answer questions in order to obtain the gold, so they walked to Mathamma's place. Shwetha ran away after seeing Mathamma, and Kiran and his friends got beaten by Mathamma. Mathamma tells her story, which happened in 1968. She, her sister Mohini, and her uncle Venu were living in the same house. Venu tells a well digger Sambath to dig a well at the back of their house and orders Mohini to help him. While digging the well, the land slides and the well becomes too deep. Sambath gets out of the well with Mohini and Mathamma's help. He requests that they bring a lamp to measure the depth of the well. They tied a rope around the lamp and put the lamp into the well. When they pulled up the rope, the lamp was missing, but a mud pot was tied with the rope. When they opened the mud pot, the pot was filled with gold jewels. By seeing this, Sambath tells them he is going to buy more lamps to get more gold.

After Sambath leaves, they discover a piece of paper with the words, "If you have anything else, send it to me." So they take a chicken and throw it down the well, and this time they get a large mud pot filled with gold and a piece of paper with the same message as earlier. Sambath came back with a lot of lamps, and he put all of them into the well, but when he pulled the rope, all the lamps were damaged. When he saw the damaged lamps, he became angry, and took an aruval, and entered the well tied up with a rope. When Mathamma and Mohini pulled the rope, a big wooden barrel appeared with a paper written with "Keep sending this to me". By seeing the paper, they send their drunkard uncle Venu into the well. They understood that the well needed human flesh, so they ask Aarumugam, a police officer, for dead bodies, which he gave. One night, Aarumugam enters the house of Mathamma and sees a lot of gold. At that time, Kaatteri came out of the well, ate one of the policemen and wrote on the wall, "Do not starve the well". By knowing this, Aarumugam planned to kill all of the villagers and feed the Kaatteri. During the festival, he cuts the electric post, and the wire rips the people. They put all of the dead bodies into the well. He also pushed Mohini and Mathamma into the well.

Mathamma's story ends, and she asks Kiran to tell him which part of her story was fact and which was fiction. Suddenly, Kamini behaves abnormally, and her face changes to Mohini's. Ponnambalam comes to the house and asks Kiran to burn Kamini. Kiran burns her, and Ponnambalam captures Mohini's ghost. When Kaatteri comes to kill them, they try to manage and save their lives. By luck, they managed that night, and then Ponnambalam tried to kill Kiran while running after him. Unfortunately, he fell down, shot himself in the chest, and died. Kiran took the bottle that has Mohini's ghost in it and gave it to Naina. Naina opens it and gets frightened by seeing the ghost.

The film ends with Kiran and Shwetha in bed, where Kiran asks Shwetha about how she knows that Aarumugam is Naina, and Shwetha asking him, "Am I beautiful?"

== Cast ==
- Vaibhav as Kiran
- Sonam Bajwa as Shwetha, Kiran's wife
- Varalaxmi Sarathkumar as Mathamma
- Aathmika as Kamini
- Karunakaran as Gajja
- Ravi Mariya as Kaliyurunda
- Kutty Gopi as Sankar
- Manali Rathod as Mohini
- Ponnambalam as Ponnambalam
- John Vijay as Naina, Aarumugam (Ponnambalam's father and Police Aarumugam)
- Chetan as Kesava Perumal
- Vinodhini Vaidyanathan as Chithra, Kesava Perumal's wife
- Lollu Sabha Manohar as Short film maker
- Balaji Mohan as Kattukuthiyan
- Besant Ravi as Etchakutty
- TSR as Santhanam
- Jangiri Madhumitha as Santhanam's wife
- Mime Gopi as Venu, Mathamma and Mohini's uncle
- Namo Narayana as Sambath, well digger
- Yogi Babu as Maanga Mani (Uncredited head appearance)

== Production ==
The principal photography of the film commenced around 20 April 2018, after the launch of the film in Chennai. The film initially speculated to cast four heroines in the female lead role including Oviya, but Oviya was later replaced by Aathmika in the shoot. However, the filmmakers managed to rope in Varalaxmi Sarathkumar, Sonam Bajwa, Aathmika, and Manali Rathod in the female prominent roles. Telugu actor Aadi was initially selected as lead actor; however, he later opted out and was replaced by Vaibhav. It was revealed that most of the portions of the film were set in a jungle in Chennai and abroad, including the neighboring country Sri Lanka, while most of the scenes of the film were apparent to have been shot during nighttime. The shooting of the film wrapped up in June 2018.

The opening sequence of the film is inspired by Ghost Ship (2002 film).

== Music ==
The soundtrack was composed by S. N. Prasad, collaborating with director Deekay for the second time after Yaamirukka Bayamey (2014). A single track titled "En Peru Enna Kelu" was released in June 2020.

Kaatteri

Soundtrack album by S. N. Prasad
- Released: 2022
- Genre: Soundtrack
- Length: 10:25
- Label: Think Music India
- Producer: S. N. Prasad

S. N. Prasad chronology
Theerpugal Virkapadum (2021)	Kaatteri (2022)	Miral (2022)

Singles from Kaatteri
- 1. "En Peru Enna Kelu" Released: 15 June 2020

Track listing
No.	Title	Lyrics	Singer(s)	Length
1.	"En Peru Enna Kelu"	Srikanth Varadan	Jonita Gandhi, Maria Roe Vincent	3:31
2.	"Katteri Theme"	Deekay	Anusha Prasad	1:13
3.	"Vaa"	Srikanth Varadan	Neeti Mohan, Gaythri SG	3:11
4.	"White-U Kodu"	Srikanth Varadan	Sathya Prakash, Nadisha Thomas	2:30

== Release ==
The film was released theatrically on 5 August 2022.

=== Home media ===
The post-theatrical streaming rights of the film were bought by Netflix, and the satellite rights of the film were bought by Zee Tamil.

=== Critic Reception ===
M Suganth of Times of india gave 2 stars out of 5 and stated that "all in the name of comedy, and this is where the film feels most outdated." Navein Darshan from Cinema Express wrote that "We sit patiently waiting for a bright moment to come our way. "and gave 2 of 5 stars.Hindu Tamil Thisai critic stated that "The director, who had set the prequel strong, did not make the story that moves towards it strong, but has sadly torn down the blank canvas."
