= Chikati Gadilo Chithakotudu =

2019 Telugu comedy horror film

- Theatrical release poster
- Directed by: Santhosh P. Jayakumar
- Based on: Iruttu Araiyil Murattu Kuththu (2018)
- Starring: Adith Arun; Nikki Tamboli; Sayantani Guhathakurta; Bhagyashree Mote
- Cinematography: Ballu
- Edited by: Prasanna GK
- Music by: Balamurali Balu
- Production company: Blue Ghost Pictures
- Release date: 21 March 2019
- Country: India
- Language: Telugu

Chikati Gadilo Chithakotudu (lit. 'Fierce punch in a dark room'; coll. Fierce masturbation or sexual encounter (punch; euphemism) in a dark room) is a 2019 Indian Telugu-language adult comedy horror film directed by Santhosh P. Jayakumar and starring Adith Arun, Nikki Tamboli, Sayantani Guhathakurta, and Bhagyashree Mote. This film is a remake of the director's own Tamil film Iruttu Araiyil Murattu Kuththu (2018) and much of the crew from the original are retained for the remake. This film marks the Telugu debut of Guhathakurta. The film released on 21 March 2019.

== Plot ==
The film is about two couples who are stuck in a haunted house with a sex-obsessed ghost, who wants to sleep with the two virgin men.

== Cast ==
- Adith Arun as Chandu
- Nikki Tamboli as Pooja
- Sayantani Guhathakurta as Ghost
- Bhagyashree Mote as Kavya
- Rajendran as Gopal Varma
- Posani Krishna Murali as Priest
- Raghu Babu as Jack
- Hemanth as Shiva
- Satyam Rajesh as Giri
- Thagubothu Ramesh as Rose
- Jangiri Madhumitha as Bhanushree
- K. S. G. Venkatesh as Chandu's father
- Madhan Chandar
- Chandrika Ravi as item dancer in "De Thadi De Thadi"

== Soundtrack ==
The songs were composed by Balamurali Balu.

- "Nuvvele Nuvve" - Nikhita Gandhi, Sanjith Hegde
- "De Thadi De Thadi" - Aishwarya Ravichandran, Naveen, Nithyashree Venkataramanan
- "Cheli Aataki Ra" - Sharanya Gopinath, Prathi Balasubrmanian
- "Party Song" - Yazin Nizar, Vishnupriya Ravi, Nivas
- "Paaki Cheddi Paapayamma" - MC Vickey
