= Jangiri Madhumitha =

Indian actress

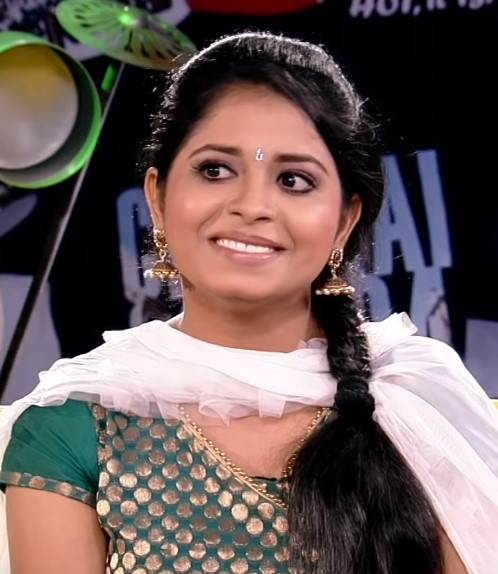
- Born: Madurai, Tamil Nadu, India
- Other name: Madhumitha
- Occupation: Actor
- Years active: 2012–present
- Spouse: Moses Joel (m. 2019)
- Children: 1
- Honours: Kalaimamani 2020

Madhumitha is an Indian actress who appears in Tamil language films and reality show in vijay TV. She often portrays comedy roles and made her film debut through Rajesh's Oru Kal Oru Kannadi (2012). She also participated in TV shows like Lollu Sabha and Kalakka Povathu Yaaru?. In 2019, she was in Bigg Boss Tamil 3 as a contestant and walked on Day 55.

== Career ==
Madhumitha started her career with Vijay TV's comedy show in Lollu Sabha. Her first feature film was Rajesh's Oru Kal Oru Kannadi (2012) in which she was paired with Santhanam. Her role as Jangiri in the film made her popular, and won her an award from Vikatan for Best Female Comedian. She has since starred in several films such as Idharkuthane Aasaipattai Balakumara (2013), Jilla (2014), Kanchana 2 (2015) and Viswasam (2019) in supporting comedy roles. She was awarded Kalaimamani award from Edappadi K. Palaniswami in 2021.

== Personal life ==
Madhumitha is the daughter of Vannai Govindan, a cadre with AIADMK. Madhumitha married her cousin Moses Joel in February 2019.

== Filmography ==
List of film performances
Year	Title	Role	Notes
2012	Oru Kal Oru Kannadi	Jangiri	Ananda Vikatan Cinema Award for Best Comedian – Female
2012	Mirattal		
2012	Attakathi		
2013	Kan Pesum Vaarthaigal	Nimmi	
2013	Sonna Puriyathu		
2013	Raja Rani	Regina's collegemate	
2013	Idharkuthane Aasaipattai Balakumara	Baby	Ananda Vikatan Cinema Award for Best Comedian – Female
2014	Jilla	Police officer	
2014	Nalanum Nandhiniyum		
2014	Tenaliraman	Kongana Valli	SICA Award for Best Actress in Comedy Role
2014	Vellaikaara Durai	Servant	
2014	Mosakutty		
2015	1 Pandhu 4 Run 1 Wicket	Kaadhambhari	
2015	Kaaki Sattai	Call girl	
2015	Kanchana 2	Aishwarya "Touchup Darling"	
2015	Iridiyam	Sarala	
2015	Demonte Colony	Jillu	
2015	Strawberry	D'Sousa's daughter	
2015	Puli	Tharagamangalam	
2016	Vaaliba Raja	Raja's assistant	
2016	Narathan	Swapna	
2016	Hello Naan Pei Pesuren	Mrs. Saravanan	
2016	Adra Machan Visilu		
2016	Ka Ka Ka Po	"Buildup" Priya	
2016	Vellikizhamai 13am Thethi	Raasathi's friend	
2016	Thirunaal	Vithya's driver	
2016	Bayam Oru Payanam		
2016	Kadhal Kaalam		
2016	Kaashmora	Kaashmora's sister	Tamil Nadu State Film Award for Best Comedian
2016	Kavalai Vendam	Shankari	
2017	Aarambamey Attakasam		
2017	Saravanan Irukka Bayamaen	Kalyanam's wife	
2017	Yaanum Theeyavan	Madhu	
2017	Keikraan Meikkiran	Vidhya	
2017	Konjam Konjam		
2017	Aangila Padam	Bobby	
2018	Sketch	Manju	
2018	Kaathadi		
2018	Paadam	Jeeva's mother	
2018	Iruttu Araiyil Murattu Kuththu	Babyshri	
2018	Pei Irukka Illaya		
2018	Kasu Mela Kasu	Myna's step mother	
2018	Enga Kattula Mazhai	Nurse	
2018	60 Vayadu Maaniram	Janaki Rajappan (Jaanu)	
2018	Mohini	Madhu	
2018	Ghajinikanth	Mrs. Uthaman	
2018	Kaatrin Mozhi	Gym worker	
2018	Karthikeyanum Kaanamal Pona Kadhaliyum		
2018	Pattinapakkam		
2019	Maanik	Jeera	
2019	Viswasam	Thookudurai's sister	
2019	K-13	Neighbour	
2019	Chikati Gadilo Chithakotudu	Bhanushree	Telugu film
2020	Utraan		
2020	Asuraguru	Officer Maheswari	
2020	Dikkiloona	Lawyer Madhu	
2020	Titanic	Megha	Unreleased film
2020	Tamilarasan		
2021	Mathil		A ZEE5 original film
2021	Annabelle Sethupathi	Thendral	
2021	Maaligai	Arthi Krishnan	Only dubbed version released
2021	Murungakkai Chips	Lingusamy's wife	
2021	Varisi		
2021	Anandham Vilayadum Veedu	Worker	
2022	Kaatteri	Santhanam's wife	
2022	Naai Sekar Returns	Babloo's wife	
2023	Tamilarasan		
2023	Jigiri Dosthu		
2023	Odavum Mudiyadhu Oliyavum Mudiyadhu	Kannagi	
2023	Sarakku		
2024	Kumbaari		
2024	Ninaivellam Neeyada		
2024	Boat	Vijaya	
2025	Madras Matinee	Boomer aunty	
2025	Desingu Raja 2	Shalini	
2025	Sareeram		
2026	Carmeni Selvam	Female Rideshare passenger	
2026	Guest		
2026	Commando Vin Love Story		
2026	Titanic	Bhoominathan's wife	

== Television ==
List of television performances
Year	Title	Role	TV	Notes/Ref.
2004–2007	Lollu Sabha	Herself	Star Vijay	
2009	Comedy Puram	Contestant	Symphony Recordings	
2009–2010	Comedy Colony	Dhanalakshmi	Jaya TV	
2010–2012	Maama Maaple	Anushkha	Sun TV	
2010–2012	Pondatti Thevai	Nandhini	Sun TV	
2010–2012	Athipookal	Banu	Sun TV	
2011	Thirumathi Selvam	Swetha	Sun TV	
2011–2013	Azhagi	Chitra	Sun TV	
2012–2013	My Name Is Mangamma	Seetha	Zee Tamil	
	Kalyani		Kaliangar TV	
2013–2015	Madipakkam Madhavan	Kausalya	Kalaignar TV	
2014–2018	Chinna Papa Periya Papa - Season 3	Pappu; Periya Papa (EP. 98 to 174)		
2016	Kalakka Povathu Yaaru (Season 5)	Judge	Star Vijay	
2016	Comedy Junction		Sun TV	
2018	Genes		Zee Tamil	
2019	Bigg Boss Tamil 3	Contestant	Star Vijay	Ejected Day 55
2020	Abhiyum Naanum	Jill Jung Juck	Sun TV	Cameo appearance
2021	Kanni Theevu	Host	Colors Tamil	
2025	Cooku with Comali - Season 6	Contestant	Star Vijay	Eliminated episode 27
2025–present	Chinnanchiru Kiliye	Jayanthi	Zee Tamil	
