= The Boys (2024 film) =

- Theatrical release poster
- Directed by: Santhosh P. Jayakumar
- Written by: Santhosh P. Jayakumar
- Produced by: E. Sendhil Kumar
- Starring: Santhosh P. Jayakumar; Shah Ra; Rajendran
- Cinematography: K. Ahamed Sherief
- Edited by: Sam RDX
- Music by: Arun Gautham
- Production companies: Dark Room Pictures; Nova Film Studios
- Release date: 29 March 2024
- Country: India
- Language: Tamil

The Boys is a 2024 Indian Tamil-language adult comedy horror film written and directed by Santhosh P. Jayakumar starring himself, Shah Ra, Arshad, KPY Vinoth, Yuvaraj Ganesan, Redin Kingsley, and Rajendran.

== Plot ==
Five carefree friends, Karthi, Akira, Kolaar, Baby, and James, live life prioritizing fun and avoiding responsibility. Their world gets a shake-up when they move into a new house brimming with hidden secrets. As they navigate quirky situations and unearth the house's mysteries, their loyalty and laughter are put to the test. Will their unshakeable bond survive the chaos? "The Boys" is a wacky, dramatic comedy that explores the ups and downs of friendship and the challenges of facing the unexpected.

== Cast ==
- Santhosh P. Jayakumar as Karthik (Dio Karthi)
- Shah Ra as Shanmugam Sundaram @ Akira
- Arshad as Gopal @ Kolaru
- KPY Vinoth as Kuzhanthai Prakasam @ Baby (Baby Bright)
- Yuvaraj Ganesan as James
- Baba Bhaskar as House owner
- Sai Dheena as Police Inspector
- Redin Kingsley as Exorcist
- Rajendran as Akira's uncle
- Mullai as Police Officer
- Arya as Robin Singh (Cameo)
- Krishna as Krishna (Cameo)

== Release ==
The Boys was released theatrically on 29 March 2024.

== Reception ==
Roopa Radhakrishnan of The Times of India rated this film three out of five stars and noted "All in all, The Boys is a wacky film with many well-thought-out comedy moments. It's a film in which Akira Kurosawa, Amitabh Bachchan, Bumble, and the song Kattipudi Kattipudida almost act as standalone characters, along with five friends and two police officers".

Narayani M. from Cinema Express rated this film two out of five stars and noted "The film relies on the idea that men are wired a certain way and panders to the problematic notion of ‘Boys will be Boys’. Despite the director mentioning that the film would tackle the ill effects of alcoholism, the film never speaks about it except for the final perfunctory monologue".

Manigandan KR from Times Now rated this film 2 1/2 out of 5 stars and noted "In all, The Boys is a fairly engaging adult comedy entertainer that is worth a one-time watch".
