= Akkada Ammayi Ikkada Abbayi (2025 film) =

2025 Indian Telugu-language film by Nitin–Bharath

- Theatrical release poster
- Directed by: Nitin–Bharath
- Screenplay by: Nitin–Bharath
- Story by: Sandeep Bolla
- Starring: Pradeep Machiraju; Deepika Pilli
- Cinematography: M. N. Balreddy
- Edited by: Kodati Pavan Kalyan
- Music by: Radhan
- Production companies: Monks & Monkeys
- Distributed by: Mythri Movie Makers
- Release date: 11 April 2025
- Running time: 147 minutes
- Country: India
- Language: Telugu

Akkada Ammayi Ikkada Abbayi is a 2025 Indian Telugu-language comedy drama film co-written and directed by Nitin–Bharath. The film features Pradeep Machiraju and Deepika Pilli in lead roles.

The film was released on 11 April 2025.

== Plot ==
Krishna, a civil engineer from Hyderabad, believes in one strange principle – never help anyone. He is sent to Bhairi Lanka village to construct bathrooms, but the villagers refuse him entry simply because he's an outsider. The village has one peculiar rule: no outsider can talk to and see Raja, the only girl in the village because every man there wants to marry her. Krishna is permitted to stay only if he agrees to avoid her completely. Everything goes smoothly until villagers learn about the relationship between Krishna and Raja.

== Cast ==
- Pradeep Machiraju as Krishna
- Deepika Pilli as Raja Kumari
- Vennela Kishore as Krishna’s brother-in-law
- Satya as Bilal
- Getup Srinu as Paani
- Muralidhar Goud as Krishna’s father
- G. M. Sundar as Rajanna
- John Vijay as criminal
- Rohini as Krishna’s mother
- Jhansi as Raja’s mother
- Brahmanandam as Krishna’s relative
- Rajitha as Krishna’s relative
- Brahmaji as Pan India Prabhakar
- Rajendran as Krishna’s boss
- Kodati Pavan Kalyan
- Chandrika Ravi (special appearance in the song "Touch lo undu")

== Music ==
All music is composed by Radhan.

No.	Title	Lyrics	Singer(s)	Length
1.	"Le Le Le Le"	Sridhar Aavunoori	Udit Narayan	3:50
2.	"Touch Lo Undu"	Chandrabose	Laxmi Dasa, P Raghu	3:47
3.	"Modhati Chinuku"	Chandrabose	Sid Sriram, Aishwarya Kumar	3:18
4.	"Priyamara"	Rakendu Mouli	Sarath Santhosh, Lipsika Bhasyam	3:26
5.	"Andala Chandamama"	M. A. Soma Sekhar	M. A. Soma Sekhar	2:20

== Release and reception ==
Akkada Ammayi Ikkada Abbayi was released on 11 April 2025.

Banda Kalyan of Samayam Telugu rated the film 2.5 out of 5 and was critical of the screenplay and story. Cinema Express cited it as "a comedy of conveniences with scattered laughs", while rating it 2 out of 5.

== Home Media ==
The digital streaming rights were acquired by ETV Win. It premiered on 8 May 2025 in Telugu.
