= Chandrika Ravi =

Australian actress

- Born: Melbourne, Australia
- Occupation: Actress
- Years active: 2017–present

Chandrika Ravi is an Australian actress who works primarily in Indian cinema. She was born and raised in Australia before moving to Los Angeles for her acting and modelling career. She became known for her role in the 2018 Indian film Iruttu Araiyil Murattu Kuththu.

== Early life and career ==
Chandrika was born in Melbourne to Ravi Sreedharan and Malika Ravi. Her parents were born in Singapore.

She started learning dancing and acting from the age of 3, then began her professional career at the age of 16; performing in theatre, film and TV around the world. She won the runner-up title in 2012 Miss Maxim India and was the first Indian descent woman to place as a state finalist in Miss World Australia 2012 and also participated in Miss India Australia.

Chandrika Ravi made her Indian film debut after being signed up to acting in the Tamil film, Sei in late 2017 which stars Nakul as male lead. She became known in the Tamil film industry through her performance in the film Iruttu Araiyil Murattu Kuththu, an adult comedy horror, in the role of a ghost. She signed for several projects after the film in special appearances and eventually lead roles.

Chandrika has her own radio show and podcast in the US, producing and hosting the show in partnership with two American networks, iHeart Radio and Rukus Avenue Radio.

== Filmography ==
| Year | Film | Role | Language | Notes |
|---|---|---|---|---|
| 2018 | Iruttu Araiyil Murattu Kuththu | Ghost | Tamil | |
| 2018 | Sei | Nancy | Tamil | |
| 2019 | Chikati Gadilo Chithakotudu | | Telugu | Special appearance in the song "De Thadi De Thadi" |
| 2023 | Veera Simha Reddy | | Telugu | Special appearance in the song "Maa Bava Manobhavalu" |
| 2025 | Akkada Ammayi Ikkada Abbayi | | Telugu | Special appearance in the song "Touch Lo undu" |
| 2025 | Blackmail | | Tamil | Special appearance in the song "Othukkiriya" |
