= Muthuramalingam =

2017 Indian film by Rajadurai

Muthuraamalingam
- Directed by: Rajadurai
- Written by: Rajadurai
- Produced by: D. Vijayprakash
- Starring: Gautham Ram Karthik; Priya Anand; Napoleon
- Cinematography: U. K. Senthil Kumar
- Edited by: P. Sai Suresh
- Music by: Ilaiyaraaja
- Production company: Global Media Works
- Release date: 24 February 2017
- Running time: 160 minutes
- Country: India
- Language: Tamil

Muthuramalingam is a 2017 Indian Tamil-language action drama film written and directed by Rajadurai. The film stars Gautham Ram Karthik and Priya Anand, while Napoleon plays a pivotal supporting role. Soundtrack was composed by Ilaiyaraaja, song lyrics written by Panchu Arunachalam. The film had a theatrical release worldwide on 24 February 2017. This film received highly negative reviews and was panned by critics.

== Cast ==
- Gautham Ram Karthik as Muthuramalingam
- Priya Anand as Vijayalakshmi (Viji)
- Napoleon as Mookkaiyya Thevar
- Suman as IG Sethuraman, Muthuramalingam's biological father
- Rekha as Muthuramalingam's biological mother
- Vivek as Rajasekar Kaalakeyan
- Chinni Jayanth as Doctor
- Viji Chandrasekhar as Nachiya, Mookkaiyya Thevar's wife
- FEFSI Vijayan as Ramaiah
- Vamsi Krishna as DSP Ashok Pandian
- Singampuli as Mookkaiyya Thevar's nephew
- Singamuthu as Swamiji
- Cell Murugan as Arul Murugan, Kaalakeyan's assistant
- Bonda Mani as Ghost
- Subbalakshmi Rangan as Ponni
- Boys Rajan as Viji's father
- Azhagu as Ramaiah's father
- Nellai Siva

== Production ==
The project was announced on 1 January 2016, with a press release stating that Gautham Karthik would work with director Rajadurai. Panchu Arunachalam, in his final project before his death, worked on the lyrics of the film's song after a sabbatical from the industry and teamed up with composer Ilaiyaraaja after a period of 21 years. In mid-January, Catherine Tresa was signed on to play the leading female role, while Prabhu, Suman and Vivek among others were signed on to feature in supporting roles. Catherine Tresa was later replaced by Priya Anand, while Prabhu was replaced by Gautham's father Karthik. A few months after production began, Karthik's leg injury meant that Napoleon subsequently replaced him in the film. Napoleon, settled in Nashville, Tennessee, made a comeback through the project and agreed to film for the project during his vacation to India for twenty two days. Priya Anand revealed that she would portray a schoolgirl, while Vivek would appear in a comedy role as a police officer.

The film was shot in locations including Sanakarankoil and Courtallam, with Gautham Karthik learning the art of silambam for his role in the film. Prior to the shoot of the film, Gautham attended a silambam coaching class held by stunt choreographer 'Kickass' Kaali. The film was completed by July 2016 after a further brief schedule was held in a studio in Chennai.

== Soundtrack ==
Actor Kamal Haasan recorded a song for the film in February 2016, after Ilaiyaraaja opted to pick him ahead of S. P. Balasubrahmanyam for the particular track. The song, written by Panchu Arunachalam, was initially meant to feature Gautham Karthik and his father, Karthik, before the latter opted out of the project. The film's soundtrack album did not have a separate release.

| No. | Title | Singer(s) | Length |
|---|---|---|---|
| 1. | "Thekatthi Singamada" | Kamal Haasan |
| 2. | "Naan Irukkum Podhu" | S. P. Balasubrahmanyam |
| 3. | "Katthi Vetti" | S. P. Balasubrahmanyam, Vibhavari |
| 4. | "Manasil Niranjavane" | Vibhavari, Ilaiyaraaja |

== Release ==
The film was released on 24 February 2017 across Tamil Nadu to highly negative reviews. A critic from The Times of India noted that the film was a "colossal disappointment", adding that "with over melodramatic scenes towards the climax, the clichéd confrontation between the families of hero and villain, and a patient-testing, age-old flashback story, the film, would have (perhaps) worked, had it released at least 20-30 years ago". The New Indian Express wrote that a "decent first half was laid to waste in the second with a terrible set of twists, turns and godawful violence". The critic lamented that "beyond just being a tiresome movie, riddled with ridiculous subplots, some of the sentiments expressed in the film are downright dangerous in these times of heightened Tamil nationalism". Indiaglitz.com stated that "Rajadurai’s direction is probably the biggest letdown with nothing gripping or solid enough to get the screenplay going", concluding that "maybe could have done well if it was released in the 80’s, for it had the usual village essence with an ensemble cast too". Sify.com gave the film a negative review adding "the editing pattern, immature manner in which violence is portrayed, b-grade glam sequences, caste glorification, over the top performances and loud dialogues cannot be even recommended to our worst enemy". A reviewer from Silverscreen.com stated "Muthuramalingam as a film is mediocre" and criticised the theme stating it promoted "casteism packaged with Tamil cinema clichés".

Five days after the release of the film, the Madras High Court issued an order restraining the screening of Muthuramalingam because its producer Vijay Prakash had not settled 28.5 lakh rupees to M. V. Prakash. Following the High Court order, the film was removed from theatres across Tamil Nadu. Post-release, Gautham Karthik admitted that from the first week of the shoot, he sensed that the film would not do well due to the inept film-making methods involved by the director. He stated he stayed on to do the film because he did not want to cause problems for the technicians of the film, who were reliant on production continuing.
