= Vimanam (2023 film) =

2023 Indian drama film

- Theatrical release poster
- Directed by: Shiva Prasad Yanala
- Written by: Shiva Prasad Yanala
- Dialogue by: Hanu Ravuri
- Produced by: Kiran Korrapati; Zee Studios
- Starring: Samuthirakani; Master Dhruvan
- Cinematography: Vivek Kalepu
- Edited by: Marthand K. Venkatesh
- Music by: Charan Arjun
- Production companies: Kiran Korrapati Creative Works; Zee Studios
- Release date: 9 June 2023
- Country: India
- Language: Telugu

Vimanam (transl. Airplane) is a 2023 Indian Telugu-language drama film written and directed by Siva Prasad Yanala. It features Samuthirakani and Master Dhruvan in lead roles It was produced by Kiran Korrapati and Zee Studios.

The film was released on 9 June 2023 and was partially filmed in Tamil.

== Plot ==
Veerayya runs the Sulabh Complex in a Hyderabad slum, near Begumpet. His life revolves around his son Raju. Veerayya has no wife or relatives, except for three neighbors: Daniel, a kindhearted auto driver; Koti, a witty cobbler; and Sumathi, a compassionate sex worker.

One day, Veerayya learns that Raju has leukemia and only a few days to live. Raju loves planes and wants to fly in an airplane. Determined to fulfill his son's wish, Veerayya works day and night to save enough money to buy two plane tickets to Tirupati. He works as a carpenter and asks Rs. 10000 from the boss, but the latter denies. On that day, a sum of Rs. 50000 is lost from the boss's account. The boss complains to the police, and Veerayya goes to jail. For this, the boss pays Rs. 10000 as a bribe. In lock up, the police beats Veerayya. Later, the boss finds out that the money was taken by his son, so he withdraws his complaint and gives Rs. 5000 as a bribe for this.

Afterward, Daniel's son and Raju are caught by airport security as they were trying to cross a fence, and they were brought to the police station. The police who beat Veerayya go to beat Raju, but Veerayya stops the police and threatens them that he will go to higher officials and file a complaint. He then acts as a comedian in an exhibition and makes the children laugh, while also getting paid a lump sum of money. Veerayya and his friends go to buy tickets at night. However, some rich guys drove the wrong way, hit Daniel's auto, fought with him and Veerayya, and stole Veerayya's money. Koti saves the money and goes to Sumathi after paying Rs. 1000. Suddenly, he has a change of mind and grabs the money from Sumathi, gives it to Veerayya, and says that Sumathi gave it. Koti explains to Sumathi about the situation. Sumathi is moved and hugs Koti.

Finally, Veerayya has enough money and books two tickets to Tirupati. With the help of Shweta, an air hostess, Veerayya and Raju board the flight, where Veerayya explains the situation to Shweta. Raju is excited on boarding the flight but unfortunately dies during it. Veerayya has an emotional outburst and requests Shweta not to reveal the death news. When the flight lands in Tirupati, Shweta finds out that Veerayya also died.

== Cast ==
- Samuthirakani as Veerayya
- Master Dhruvan as Raju
- Meera Jasmine as Shweta
- Anasuya Bharadwaj as Sumathi
- Rahul Ramakrishna as Koti
- Dhanraj as Daniel
- Rajendran as Balaraju
- Cheran Raj as Police Officer
- Thotapalli Madhu as constable
- Sandhya Janak as Doctor
- Satish Saripalli as teacher

== Production ==
The film was produced by Kiran Korrapati and Zee Studios. It also mark a comeback film for Meera Jasmine in the Telugu film industry. The film was entirely made in Telugu and a key scene from the film featuring Samuthirakani was additional filmed in Tamil.

== Music ==
The music for the film was composed by Charan Arjun and the music distribution rights was acquired by Aditya Music.

Track listing
No.	Title	Lyrics	Singer(s)	Length
1.	"Rela Rela"	Charan Arjun	Mangli	4:29
2.	"Sumathi"	Charan Arjun	Charan Arjun	3:04
Total length:				7:33

== Release ==
The film was released on 9 June 2023. The film streamed on ZEE5 on June 30, 2023.

== Reception ==
Paul Nicodemus of The Times of India gave it 3 out of 5 stars and wrote, "Vimanam is a film that showcases a father's (and parents') love for his son (and children) and possesses universal appeal. Watch it for its solid performances and decent production values." Satya Pulagam of ABP Live Telugu gave it 2.5 out of 5 stars and wrote, "The film has heart-wrenching emotional scenes, but it lacks a better narrative to connect the audience with the film."

Raghu Bandi of The Indian Express gave it 2 out of 5 stars and wrote, "Vimanam is such a 80’s movie that it should have stayed there. Viewers who like sentimental movies, tearjerkers might like this film. They can try it when it comes on OTT.".

Latha Srinivasan of India Today rated 2 out of 5 and stated that "he filled the story with so much melodrama that it's far too bleak to enjoy."

Sangeetha Devi Dundoo of The Hindu reviewed the film as "Samuthirakani shoulders a melodramatic tale" and wrote "Samuthirakani and child actor Dhruvan put their best foot forward in the Telugu-Tamil bilingual ‘Vimanam’ that has its moments but gets progressively melodramatic and contrived"
