= Rajendran =

Indian stunt double, actor (born 1957)

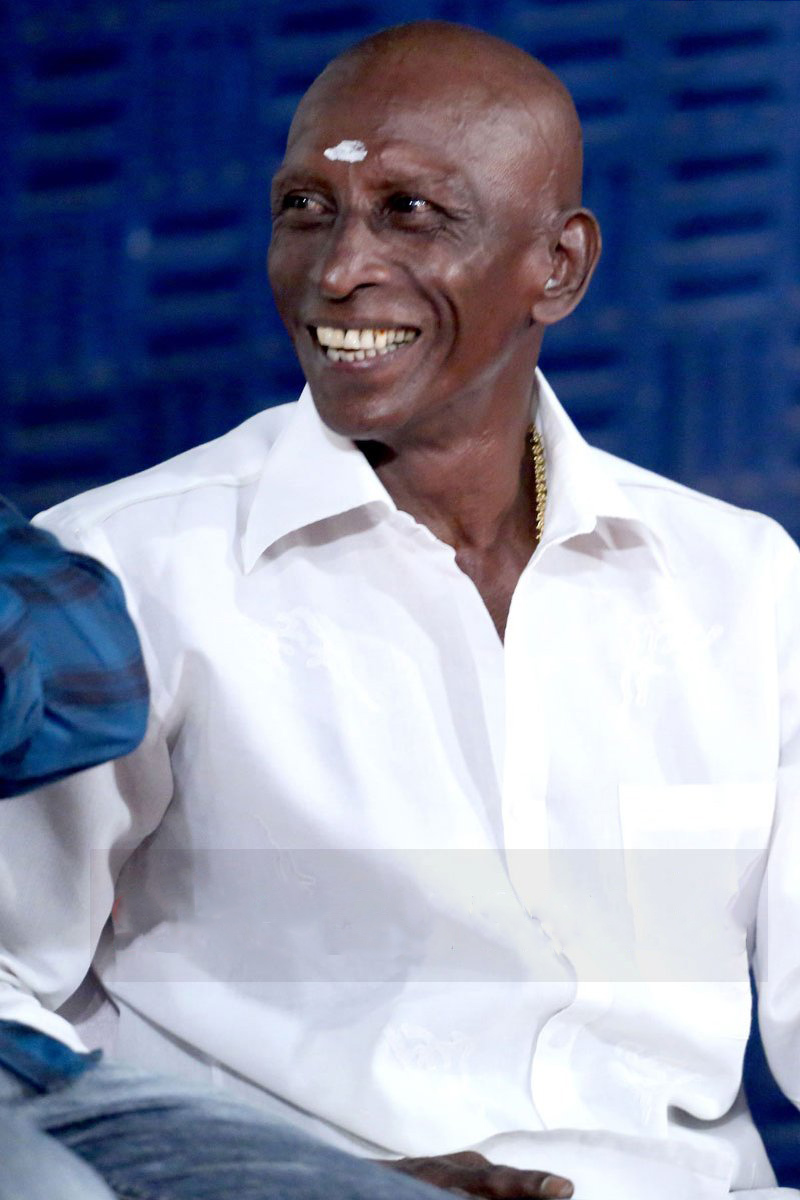
- Raasendran at the Vilaasam Press Meet
- Born: 1 June 1957 (age 69)
- Other names: Naan Kadavul Rajendran, Mottai Rajendran
- Occupations: Stunt double; actor
- Years active: 1978–present

Arunachalam Rajendran (born 1 June 1957), better known as Mottai Rajendran or Naan Kadavul Rajendran, is an Indian stunt double and actor working mainly in Tamil cinema. He debuted in 2003 with the Tamil film Pithamagan and has worked as a stunt double in over 500 South Indian films since then. He played the role of a villain in Naan Kadavul (2009) which won huge critical acclaim and fetched him the Tamil Nadu State Film Award for Best Villain. Since then, he has continued to play villainous and later humorous supporting characters in a number of Tamil films. He is noted for his rough voice and alopecia universalis, which he claims was the result of coming into contact with industrial waste during a stunt sequence.

== Career ==
Rajendran began his film career working as a stunt double in hundreds of south Indian films mostly in Tamil.

He played a small but significant role in Pithamagan (2003) and made his full-fledged acting debut as a villain in Naan Kadavul (2009). His performance as a cruel leader who tortures beggars earned critical acclaim with a critic noting that he is "menacing and loathsome".

Following his villainous comedy role in Boss Engira Bhaskaran (2010), he says he was typecast in similar roles. His appearance as a killer who dons the garb of a woman in Thirudan Police (2014) was appreciated by critics as "the ultimate showstealer and his already popular lady makeover clinches it big time". His first release in 2015 was Darling, where he appeared as the ghostbuster. The Times of India wrote, "His bald head, thin figure and sandpapery voice make him effective for both villainous and comical roles but from the screams and whistles that his character gets, it is clear that he has made much more impact as a comedian". His second release of the year was Ivanuku Thannila Gandam (2015), where he appeared as a murderer. Before its release, Rajendran's presence in the film's promotional videos received a positive response. The film was released to negative reviews, though Rajendran's performance was appreciated by critics, one of whom noted that "the film belongs to Rajendran as he comes out with his trademark dialogue delivery [...] and carries the entire film".

He later co-starred mostly with actor Santhanam in movies Dhilluku Dhuddu (2016), Dhilluku Dhuddu 2 (2019), Biskoth (2020), Parris Jeyaraj (2021), Dikkiloona (2021), DD Returns (2023), 80s Buildup (2023), Vadakkupatti Ramasamy (2024) and Devil's Double Next Level (2025).

== Personal life ==
A. Rajendran was born on 1 June 1957 in Thoothukudi, Tamil Nadu, India. His father, Arunachalam, and two elder brothers are also stunt masters. Rajendran previously used to have androgenic hair, but following an incident in which he jumped into a pond of chemical runoff from a nearby factory as part of a stunt for a Malayalam film Tokyo Nagarathile Viseshangal, he had lost every bit of hair from his body, earning him the nickname "Motta" Rajendran.

== Filmography ==
Key
†	Denotes films that have not yet been released

=== Tamil films ===
List of Rajendran Tamil film credits
Year	Title	Role	Notes
1991	Rudhra	Henchman	Uncredited role
1992	Amaran	Henchman	Uncredited role
1992	Thambi Pondatti	Henchman	Uncredited role
1992	Thirumathi Palanisamy	Henchman	Uncredited role
1993	Gentleman	Henchman	Uncredited role
1995	Puthiya Aatchi	Henchman	Uncredited role
2003	Lesa Lesa	Deva's friend	Uncredited role
2003	Pithamagan	Prison warden	Uncredited role
2005	Thotti Jaya	Henchman	Uncredited role
2006	Vettaiyaadu Vilaiyaadu	Henchman in 'Karka Karka' song	Uncredited role
2006	Thalaimagan	Fighter	Uncredited role
2007	Thee Nagar	Henchman	Uncredited role
2009	Naan Kadavul	Thandavan	Tamil Nadu State Film Award for Best Villain; Nominated, Filmfare Award for Best Supporting Actor – Tamil
2010	Boss Engira Bhaskaran	Velpandi	
2010	Baana Kaathadi	Gang leader	
2010	Uthamaputhiran	Velu	
2010	Milaga	Rajendran	
2010	Thambi Arjuna	Mani	
2011	Ilaignan	Kaalia	
2011	Mugaputhagam	Goon	Short film
2011	Rowthiram	A local goon	
2011	Thambikottai	Amirthalingam	
2011	Velayudham	A local goon	
2011	Ambuli	Guhan	
2012	Varudangal 20	Annachi	
2013	Samar	Tree cutter	
2013	Kan Pesum Vaarthaigal	Janani's uncle	
2013	Singam 2	Sahaayam	
2013	Pattathu Yaanai	Hotel owner	
2013	Varuthapadatha Valibar Sangam	Goolmaayi	
2013	Raja Rani	Henry	
2013	Idharkuthane Aasaipattai Balakumara	Painter Rajendran (Raj)	
2013	Maayai		
2014	Kadhal Solla Aasai	Verumpuli	
2014	Vilaasam		
2014	Thirudan Police	Manickam	
2014	Vellaikaara Durai	Rajendran	
2015	Darling	Ghost Gopal Varma	
2015	Ivanuku Thannila Gandam	Mark	
2015	Kalakattam		
2015	Nannbenda	"Scorpio" Shankar	
2015	Kanchana 2	Marudhu's brother	
2015	Masss	Ghost	
2015	Eli	Kuruvi Manda Kumaru	
2015	Palakkattu Madhavan	U. Santosh Kumar	
2015	Sakalakala Vallavan	Inspector Muthukaruppan / Robot	
2015	Adhibar		
2015	49-O	Advertisement director	
2015	Jippaa Jimikki		
2015	Naanum Rowdydhaan	Rowdy Raja	
2015	Om Shanti Om	Vavval Pandi	
2015	Vedalam	"Kolkata" Kaali	
2015	Thiruttu Rail		
2016	Peigal Jaakkirathai		
2016	Nayyapudai	Baby Anaconda	
2016	Vaaliba Raja	Ragendra	
2016	Theri	P. Rajender	Nominated – Filmfare Award for Best Supporting Actor – Tamil
2016	Velainu Vandhutta Vellaikaaran	Ghost 'Motai' Guru	
2016	Enakku Innoru Per Irukku	Maha	
2016	Jackson Durai	Bradlee (Suruli)	
2016	Dhilluku Dhuddu	Sketch "Mani"	
2016	Arthanari		
2016	Wagah	PET Master	
2016	Yaanai Mel Kuthirai Sawaari		
2016	Remo	Mohana Santhosh	
2016	Kadavul Irukaan Kumaru	Father Francis Rajendran	
2016	Atti		
2016	Veera Sivaji	CBI officer	
2017	Bairavaa	Traffic police M. Rajendran	
2017	Enakku Vaaitha Adimaigal	Karuppu Rock	
2017	Mupparimanam	Himself	Cameo
2017	Motta Shiva Ketta Shiva	Tsunami Star Subash	
2017	Bruce Lee	Uncle of Abbas	
2017	Paambhu Sattai	Water company owner	
2017	Sangili Bungili Kadhava Thorae	Chairman	
2017	Thangaratham	Malaichamy	
2017	Anbanavan Asaradhavan Adangadhavan	Mani / Rajhu	
2017	Gemini Ganeshanum Suruli Raajanum	Sulthan Bhai	
2017	Podhuvaga Emmanasu Thangam	Rajendran	
2017	Katha Nayagan	Mike Maari	
2017	Neruppu Da	MLA Kabali	
2017	Bayama Irukku	Ajith	
2017	Pichuva Kaththi		
2017	Hara Hara Mahadevaki	Spike	
2017	Mersal	Health Minister	
2017	Brahma.com	Vanagamudi	
2018	Gulaebaghavali	Annachi	
2018	Madura Veeran		
2018	Solli Vidava	Narayana	
2018	Veera	Jonty Rhodes	
2018	Kaathadi		
2018	Munthal		
2018	Iruttu Araiyil Murattu Kuththu	Jack	
2018	Kaathiruppor Pattiyal		
2018	Mohana		
2018	Junga	S. Duraisingam	
2018	Ghajinikanth	Rajini's friend	
2018	Maniyaar Kudumbam	Chellakilli	
2018	Kolamavu Kokila	Alponse	
2018	Aaruthra	Avudaiappan's assistant	
2018	Seema Raja	Himself	Special appearance
2018	Nota	Ramaswamy	
2018	Kalavani Mappillai	Vanagamoodi	
2019	Vantha Rajavathaan Varuven	Loan collector	
2019	Dhilluku Dhuddu 2	Viji's uncle	
2019	Nethraa		
2019	Pettikadai		
2019	Pottu	Thief	
2019	Boomerang	Film producer	
2019	Sangathamizhan	Kittappa	
2019	Natpuna Ennanu Theriyuma	Raju's father	
2019	Dharmaprabhu	Shiva	
2019	Gorilla	Saloon Owner	
2019	A1	CCTV Chidambaram	
2019	Jackpot	Motta	
2019	Puppy		
2019	50/50	Pachai Kulandhai	
2020	Time Enna Boss	"Semma Singer" Judge / Mahatma Gandhi from Earth 36	Web series
2020	Irandam Kuththu	Swamiji	
2020	Naanga Romba Busy	Corrupt businessman	
2020	Biskoth	Mottappa	
2020	Time Up		
2021	Trip	Anjaa Puli	
2021	Naanum Single Thaan	Mr Love	
2021	Paris Jayaraj	Guru	
2021	Michaelpatty Raja	Naidu	
2021	Engada Iruthinga Ivvalavu Naala	Nesamani	
2021	Call Taxi	Kamal	
2021	Dikkiloona	Mental hospital doctor	
2021	Pei Mama	Sethupathi	
2021	MGR Magan	Mattapparai	
2021	Anandham Vilayadum Veedu	Worker	
2022	Kundas		
2022	Kadamaiyai Sei	Thief	
2022	Powder		
2022	Gurumoorthi	Security Guard	
2022	Varalaru Mukkiyam	Chris Gayle	
2022	Oh My Ghost		
2023	Vaathi	'Bittu' Bhupathi	
2023	Single Shankarum Smartphone Simranum	Police	
2023	Pallu Padama Paathukka	Ramesh	
2023	Kannitheevu		
2023	Ghosty	Motta (Mental hospital warden)	
2023	Ellaam Mela Irukuravan Paathuppan	Superstar Rajeshkanth and alien	Dual roles
2023	Vimanam	Balaraju	Partially reshot version
2023	Rayar Parambarai	Shanthamurthy	
2023	DD Returns	Professor	
2023	Lockdown Diarie		
2023	Web		
2023	Japan	Japan's aide	
2023	80s Buildup	Diamond thief	
2023	Sarakku		
2024	Vadakkupatti Ramasamy	Goon	
2024	Guardian	Azhagu's brother-in-law	
2024	Yaavarum Vallavare	Paandi	
2024	The Boys	Sundaram's uncle	
2024	Rathnam	Mahesh	
2024	Aranmanai 4	Rathnam	
2024	Thozhar CheGuevara	Doctor Naveen	
2025	Madha Gaja Raja	Viswanath’s henchman	
2025	Baby and Baby	Thokkudurai	
2025	Otha Votu Muthaiya	Sithappa	
2025	Leg Piece	Annachi	
2025	Devil's Double Next Level	"Veen Pechu" Babu	
2025	Chennai City Gangsters	Memory Dass	
2025	Desingu Raja 2	Dinesh	
2025	Bhoghee		
2025	Rambo		
2025	Rajini Gaang	Jadamudi Jambulingam	
2025	Konja Naal Poru Thalaiva		
2025	Galatta Family	Doctor	
2026	Lucky the Superstar	Motta Rajendran	Voice role
2026	Kenatha Kanom		

=== Telugu films ===
List of Rajendran Telugu film credits
Year	Title	Role	Notes
2004	Lakshmi Narasimha	Henchman	Uncredited role
2004	Gudumba Shankar	Henchman	Uncredited role
2004	Sakhiya		Uncredited role
2005	Sri		Uncredited role
2006	Kithakithalu	Watermelon seller	Uncredited role
2007	Athidi	Henchman	Uncredited role
2018	Chalo	Senior Veeramuthu	
2019	Chikati Gadilo Chithakotudu	Gopal Varma	
2022	Sammathame	Assistant of Music Director	
2022	F3	Gudivada Gurunatham	
2023	Waltair Veerayya	Gundu Mani	
2023	Sir	'Boothu' Bhushanam	
2023	Vimanam	Balaraju	
2025	Akkada Ammayi Ikkada Abbayi	Krishna’s Boss	
2025	Tribanadhari Barbarik	Dasanna	
2025	They Call Him OG	Gossiper	
2025	Gurram Paapi Reddy	Sangi Reddy	
2026	Trimukha	Watchman Veerabadram	
2026	Sathi Leelavathi		

=== Malayalam films ===
List of Rajendran Malayalam film credits
Year	Title	Role	Notes
1999	Tokyo Nagarathile Viseshangal	Thug	Uncredited role
1999	F.I.R.	BSS Soldier	Uncredited role
2000	Sathyameva Jayathe	Sulaiman's henchman	Uncredited role
2001	Randam Bhavam	Goon	Uncredited role
2002	Thandavam	Shankar Das's henchman	Uncredited role
2008	Magic Lamp	Goon	Uncredited role
2010	Pulliman	Dasappan	
2018	Street Lights	Manimaran	
2018	Odiyan	Odiyan doppelgänger	
2019	Love Action Drama	SI Rajendran	
2019	Kamala	Thoothukudi Raja	
2024	Bad Boyz		
2025	Pariwar	Gold Raja	
2025	The Protector		
2026	Melcow Pondicherry		

=== Other language films ===
List of Rajendran other language film credits
Year	Title	Role	Language	Notes
2005	Insan	Head of Cobra gang	Hindi	Uncredited role
2008	Ghajini	Ghajini's henchman	Hindi	Uncredited role
2010	Naayaka	Nagappa	Kannada	
2017	Kolara		Kannada	
