= Athaimadi Methaiadi =

Indian film

- Title card
- Directed by: K. S. Gopalakrishnan
- Screenplay by: K. S. Gopalakrishnan
- Story by: Dakshinamoorthy
- Produced by: Chinnadurai; Ravi
- Starring: K. S. G. Venkatesh; Pallavi; Ilavarasi
- Cinematography: J. V. Suresh Vijayam
- Edited by: R. Devarajan
- Music by: S. R. Vasu
- Production company: C.R. Productions
- Release date: 15 September 1989
- Country: India
- Language: Tamil

Athaimadi Methaiadi (transl. The aunt's lap is a mattress) is a 1989 Indian Tamil-language film written and directed by K. S. Gopalakrishnan. The film stars his son K. S. G. Venkatesh (in his acting debut), Pallavi and Ilavarasi. It was released on 15 September 1989. The film's title is named after a song from Gopalakrishnan's Karpagam (1963).

== Plot ==
Sundaramoorthy raises his adopted daughter Radha with immense affection, while harboring hatred towards his biological daughter Suguna, whom he blames for her mother's death. Suguna studies in a hostel, isolated from her family. Radha is in love with her cousin Raja, but his parents oppose their relationship due to Radha's adoptive status. During a trip to Vedaranyam, Radha gets a poisonous bite and faints, but soon recovers after returning to Madras. Radha loves books, animals, and taking care of kids, despite frequently experiencing dizziness from extensive reading. Meanwhile, Sundaramoorthy's sister, Mangamma, and her husband Sargunam live with him, plotting to exploit his wealth. They bring in two stage actors to pose as rich suitors for Radha, hoping to get her out of the house and marry Raja to Suguna instead. However, Sundaramoorthy's cook discovers the impersonators' true identities, foiling their plan.

Sundaramoorthy chases Raja's parents out of his house after discovering their deceitful plan. Raja leaves with his parents, separating him from Radha. In distress, Radha attempts to harm herself, but Raja saves her just in time. The next day, Radha's health takes a turn for the worse, with numbness in her hands and legs. The doctor advises rest and medication in a hill station. Sundaramoorthy takes Radha to his Kodaikanal bungalow, while Raja is tasked with managing the business in Madras. However, Raja visits Kodaikanal to oversee arrangements. Meanwhile, Suguna drives to meet Radha but is attacked by a group of molesters and their gang, who had previously tried to harm her. Fortunately, Narthana, a dancer, intervenes and saves Suguna. Suguna and Narthana then head to Kodaikanal together.

A year passes, and Radha recovers, receiving a clean bill of health from Dr. Jagadeesan. Excited to be cured, Radha explores Kodaikanal and finds an abandoned baby on the streets, which she decides to rescue and take care of back in Madras. The family suspects Radha of having an out-of-wedlock child with Raja, leading to accusations and blame. Sundaramoorthy challenges the accusers to find a suitable groom for Radha, who believes in her purity. Meanwhile, Sargunam challenges Sundaramoorthy to marry Raja to a rich bride, but Raja agrees to play along. On the day of the simultaneous engagements, Raja cleverly reveals a false confession to save Radha from marrying the wrong person. Sundaramoorthy realizes Raja's intentions and the love between Raja and Radha, and promptly marries them instead.

Radha and Raja start their new life together, taking care of the rescued baby. Radha vows to find the baby's biological parents to clear her own name and restore her family's honor. Raja supports her decision and also decides to find a suitable groom for Suguna. They begin caring for the baby together, and Raja finds a caretaker, Mohana, to nurse the baby. Coincidentally, Narthana, the dancer who saved Suguna, becomes a performer at Raja's hotel and moves into the rented portion above his house. Raja discovers Narthana's secret intentions and decides to protect her. Meanwhile, Mohana's suspicious husband accuses Raja of having an affair with Mohana and fires her. Unbeknownst to Raja, Mohana seems to be hiding something, as seen in her secret conversation with Pallavi.

Narthana begins caring for the baby, and Radha suspects she might be the biological mother. Raja devises a plan to reveal the truth, bringing in actors claiming to be the baby's parents. Narthana confesses she's the mother, revealing she intentionally left the baby for Radha to find while she sought her rapist. However, the molesters, who are also the would-be grooms Sundaramoorthy had fixed for Suguna, escape with the baby. Narthana recognizes the rapist's distinctive leg wound, and an intense chase ensues. Raja rescues the baby, and the molester is arrested. The film concludes with Suguna's hasty marriage to the hotel owner's son, fulfilling Raja and Radha's vows, allowing them to start their intimate life.

== Cast ==
- K. S. G. Venkatesh as Raja
- Pallavi as Narthana
- Ilavarasi as Radha
- R. V. Kousalya as Suguna
- S. S. Chandran as Sargunam, Raja's father
- Prameela as Mangamma, Raja's mother
- K. G. Shanthi as Mangalam
- Madhumohan as the one who sexually assaulted Narthana
- Major Sundarrajan as Sundaramoorthy
- Vennira Aadai Moorthy as Raja's bride's father
- Oru Viral Krishna Rao as a cook
- Achamillai Gopi as the Hotel owner's son
- Veeraraghavan as Dr. Jagadeesan
- Loose Mohan as S. S. Chandran's sidekick
- Meesai Murugesan as Sundaramoorthy, Mangamma and Mangalam's father
- MLA Thangaraj as Rajapat Sokkalingam, a fake groom's father
- Pasi Sathya as a fake groom's mother
- Nanjil Nalini as Sundaramoorthy, Mangamma and Mangalam's mother
- Ennathe Kannaiah as a constable (uncredited role)
- Senthil in a special appearance as Mohana's husband

== Soundtrack ==
Soundtrack was composed by S. R. Vasu.

Track listing
No.	Title	Singer(s)	Length
1.	"I Love You"	S. P. Balasubrahmanyam, K. S. Chithra
2.	"Aararo"	Vani Jairam
3.	"Oh My Dear"	S. P. Sailaja
4.	"Themmangu"	S. P. Balasubrahmanyam
5.	"Ponmalar"	K. S. Chithra

== Reception ==
P. S. S. of Kalki wrote that the director seemed to have been confused about where the story begins, where the story ends, where the direction lies, and how it ends.
