= August 16 1947 =

2023 Tamil film

- Theatrical release poster
- Directed by: N. S. Ponkumar
- Written by: N. S. Ponkumar
- Produced by: AR Murugadoss; Om Prakash Bhatt; Narsiram Choudhary
- Starring: Gautham Ram Karthik; Revathy Sharma
- Cinematography: Selvakumar S. K.
- Edited by: R. Sudharsan
- Music by: Sean Roldan
- Production companies: A. R. Murugadoss Productions; Purple Bull Entertainment; God Bless Entertainment
- Release date: 7 April 2023
- Running time: 144 minutes
- Country: India
- Language: Tamil

August 16, 1947 (also marketed as 1947) is a 2023 Indian Tamil-language historical action thriller drama film written and directed by N.S. Ponkumar. It is produced by AR Murugadoss, Om Prakash Bhatt, Narsiram Choudhary under A. R. Murugadoss Productions, Purple Bull Entertainment, and God Bless Entertainment. The film stars Gautham Ram Karthik and Revathy Sharma with Pugazh, Madhusudhan Rao, Jason Shah, and Richard Ashton in supporting roles. It was released on 7 April 2023.

== Plot ==
The film is set during 1947 and revolves around the lives of people in a village named Sengadu, near Puliyankudi. The village is under the control of a cruel British officer Robert (Richard Ashton) who along with his son Justin (Jason Shah) troubles the local people. Sengadu is known for its high-quality cotton cultivation and the poor local people are made to work hard by Robert under worst conditions. Justin is a womaniser and takes away several girls often from the village. In fact, many villagers conduct honour killing to safeguard their women when Justin sets an eye on them. Paraman (Gautham Karthik) belongs to Sengadu, but is closely associated with the local Zamindar (Madhusudhan Rao). The Zamindar is hated by the villagers as he is of no help and he just obeys the orders of Robert in order to hold his wealth and power. Paraman has a hatred towards the villagers because he believes that the villagers are responsible for his mother’s death as no one came forward to help her save from the Britishers several years ago which led to her suicide.

Zamindar has a daughter Thenmalli (Revathy Sharma) who happens to be a good friend of Paraman. However, Thenmalli is always confined inside Zamindar’s palace and no one in the village knows about the existence of Thenmalli except Paraman. This is in order to prevent Thenmalli from being abducted by Justin or other British officers. Paraman has a love towards Thenmalli but does not inform her. Zamindar plans to get Thenmalli married to another nearby Zamindar’s son. Knowing this, Paraman decides to hide his feelings within himself. In the meantime, India is granted independence by the British and Robert has been called for a meeting at a nearby place by his senior officers. However, Robert makes sure that the villagers are not aware of the news on independence as he wants to leave the village with the power and respect.

Justin finds Thenmalli in Zamindar’s house and wants to sleep with her. As Zamindar has no other option, he decides to kill Thenmalli to protect their family honour. However, Paraman arrives and saves Thenmalli. He also kills Justin and hides his dead body in the forest. Paraman takes Thenmalli to his village and everyone gets shocked knowing that Zamindar had a daughter hidden all these years. As the villagers are not aware about the independence, they fear that Robert would kill them all upon his return. Thenmalli understands that Paraman is in love with her since childhood and reciprocates the feelings. Paraman’s perception about the villagers change as he understands that the villagers have a deep regret for not saving Paraman’s mother previously and they worship her as a deity.

Robert gets the news about Justin and returns to Sengadu furiously with plans of killing everyone. Robert kills Zamindar and a few other villagers. However, Paraman fights Robert with the help of villagers and Robert is killed. Meanwhile, they also get the news about independence, and everyone feels happy.

== Cast ==
- Gautham Ram Karthik as Paraman
- Revathy Sharma as Thenmalli
- Pugazh as Thavudu
- Madhusudhan Rao as Sengadu Zamindar
- Bose Venkat as Indian officer
- Neelima Rani as Paraman's mother
- Jason Shah as Justin
- Madhan Bob
- TSR Srinivasan as Thangavelu

Uncredited

- Richard Ashton as Robert Clive
- Junior MGR as Sengadu Zamindar's son

== Soundtrack ==
The music was composed by Sean Roldan.

Track listing
No.	Title	Lyrics	Singer(s)	Length
1.	"Seenikaari"	Mohan Rajan	Sean Roldan and Sathyaprakash Dharmar	4:04
2.	"Kottikara Payalae"	NS Ponkumar	Sean Roldan and Meenakshi Ilayaraja	4:10
3.	"Kottunga Da"	Mohan Raja	Ananthu and Manoj Krishna	4:31
Total length:				12:45

== Release ==
The film was released worldwide in theatres on 7 April 2023 in Tamil, Telugu, Kannada, Hindi, Malayalam and English languages. It began streaming on Amazon Prime Video from 5 May 2023.

== Reception ==
On the review aggregator website Rotten Tomatoes, 14% of 7 critics' reviews are positive, with an average rating of 4/10.

Bhuvanesh Chandar for The Hindu wrote "It’s a no-brainer that August 16, 1947 would have looked like next-big-hit on paper. But the abysmal execution and editing fail the material and leave nothing memorable". Saibal Chatterjee for NDTV rated 1 star out of 5 stars and wrote "It seems to have been written in haste and staged without much thought. The storyline is a maze, the characters are riddled with contradictions and the general tone of the drama is beyond shrill."

Kirubhakar Purushothaman for The Indian Express wrote "In essence, August 16, 1947 and Vetrimaaran's Viduthalai are pretty much about the same subject, freedom. Even their plots have obvious similarities. Both films are about villages suffering from authoritative forces." Dhaval Roy for The Times of India rated the film 3 stars out of 5 and wrote "The scenes of atrocities on the people are created realistically and are disturbing in many instances. T Santhanam's art direction and the tribals' look (one person wears massive padlocks on his elongated earlobes) deserve mention."

Vinamra Mathur for Firstpost wrote "Murugadoss' films, even the ones wholly underwhelming, have had some moments of pathos and genuine thrill, even Darbar and Spyder. August 16, 1947, I'm afraid, is devoid of tension and thrill." Janani K of India Today wrote "Gautham Karthik as Paraman delivered an earnest performance in the film. Pugazh is his sidekick and gets to play a serious role. In the second half, his performance stood out."

Nandini Ramnath for Scroll.in wrote "Director Ponkumar has simply been too swept away by his RRR knockoff to bring his saga of suffering to a close. Emancipation from the unremitting histrionics never quite comes." Mudit Bhatnagar for Zoom TV praised Gautham Karthik's performance and wrote "Gautham Karthik as Param is extremely believable. He hasn't gone overboard in the emotional scenes, thus making a movie packed with disturbing elements a little less heavy." A critic from Dinamalar gave 2.75 out of 5 stars and gave a mixed review.
