= Josh Vivian =

Indian singer-songwriter

Josh Vivian (born 13 December 1990) is an Indian composer, singer, and songwriter based in Chennai, Tamil Nadu. He is the founder and frontman of Namma Ooru Boy Band (NOBB), the first Tamil boy band. He released his first single, "Cosmopolitan Kadhali", in April 2014 and quickly gained prominence.

== Early life ==
Josh Vivian was born on 13 December 1990, in Chennai, India. He was raised in a traditional Christian family and, at the age of 4, began performing in gospel choirs, with church bands, and as a solo artist. He was also influenced by international pop singers like Michael Jackson and the Backstreet Boys. When he was 16, he recorded a Tamil gospel album for music director Stephen Sanders. He began writing and composing songs when he was 18.

After earning a bachelor's degree from Loyola College, Chennai, Josh began working as a banker at the Royal Bank of Scotland, and later moved to Amazon.com. However, he also continued singing for rock, pop, acoustic, and a cappella bands. When he was 20, he started to make cover versions of English-language hits, which he posted on YouTube. He wrote his first original song, "Lover of My Soul", when he was 22.

== Music career ==
Josh started his career in 2010 as a YouTube artist, recording covers of international hits like Coldplay's "Fix You" and Maroon 5's "Payphone". His videos gained attention in and around Chennai. His first original single was a gospel song, "Lover of My Soul". He made his mainstream debut in 2012 by collaborating with a well-known Tamil hip-hop group, Hiphop Tamizha. He sang with the band's frontman Adhi on two hit tracks, "Senthamizh Penne" and "Iraiva", for the album "Remy Martin Hiphop". His cameo in the band's viral hit "Club le Mabbu le" was his first appearance in an independent Tamil music video. He toured with Hiphop Tamizha for a year and a half before starting his own band.

Josh started the first Tamil boy band, naming it "Namma Ooru Boy Band". In 2013, he wrote his first Tamil track, "Cosmopolitan Kadhali". The song featured Andrew Arun (who also produced the music video) and the guitarists Keba Jeremiah and Joshua Satya. Vivian directed the music video with a childhood friend, C.S. Kirruthi Vasan. The video features a model, Surya Ganapathy, in the main role, and Tamil actor Sidesh Melwin in a cameo. The promotional video for the song, released in November 2013, was endorsed by Anirudh Ravichander, a musician who went to college with Josh. The full video was launched on 17 April 2014. It became one of the first non-film music videos to be aired on local television channels, and received more than 700,000 YouTube views.
