= Madurai Central Prison =

Prison in Madurai, India

Coordinates: 9.929101°N 78.101903°E

- Location in Tamil Nadu Madurai Central Prison (India)
- Location: Madurai
- Security class: Central Prison
- Capacity: 1,252
- Managed by: Tamil Nadu Prison Department

Madurai Central Prison is located in Madurai, India. The prison complex occupies 31 acres (130,000 m^{2}). It is authorised to accommodate 1,252 prisoners.

== History ==
The prison was built in 1865.
