= K. S. G. Venkatesh =

Indian film actor, producer

- Born: Tamil Nadu, India
- Occupations: Actor; producer
- Years active: 1984-2005; 2014-present
- Children: 1
- Father: K S Gopalakrishnan

K. S. G. Venkatesh is an Indian actor and producer in the Tamil film industry. He is the son of director K. S. Gopalakrishnan. He acted in over fifty films predominantly in Tamil film industry and more than 20 TV serials; around 2500 episodes.

== Career ==
He started his career as a cameraman and producer for his debut TV serial Kattupattichatiram which was telecasted on Doordarshan in 1984-85. He later continued producing serials in Tamil for which he was also the cameraman. In 1989, Venkatesh was later introduced in the movie Athaimadi Methaiadi.

== Filmography ==
- All films are in Tamil, unless otherwise indicated.

List of K. S. G. Venkatesh film credits
Year	Title	Role	Notes
1989	Athaimadi Methaiadi	Raja	debut as hero
1992	Naalaya Seidhi		
1994	Maindhan		
1999	Aasaiyil Oru Kaditham		
2005	Englishkaran	Dhamodharan	
2014	Sathuranga Vettai	Moovendhar	
2015	Paayum Puli	Rathnavel	
2016	Kadhalum Kadandhu Pogum	Yazhini's father	
2016	Rekka	Mala's father	
2017	Kuttram 23	Thendral's father	
2017	Peechankai	Uthaman	
2017	Maayavan	Kumaran's father	
2017	Balloon	Cinema producer	
2018	Sketch	Amuthavali's father	
2018	Iruttu Araiyil Murattu Kuththu	Veera's father	
2018	Ghajinikanth	Gayathri's father	
2018	NOTA	Opposition Leader Varadarajan	
2018	Aan Devathai	Restaurant owner	
2019	Chikati Gadilo Chithakotudu	Chandu's father	Telugu film
2019	Neeya 2	Sarva's father	
2019	Kolaigaran	Forensic medical examiner	
2019	Kolaiyuthir Kaalam	Caretaker	
2019	Mei	Shanti's father	
2019	Petromax	Saravanan's father	
2019	Sangathamizhan	Venkatesh	
2020	Irandam Kuththu	Veera's father	
2021	Oh Manapenne!	Shruthi's father	
2022	Veeramae Vaagai Soodum	Mythili's father	
2022	Sinam	Madhangi’s father	
2022	Naan Mirugamaai Maara		
2022	Naai Sekar Returns	Saint	
2023	Thalaikkavasamum 4 Nanbargalum		
2024	PT Sir	Priest	Uncredited
2024	Maya Puthagam		
2025	House Mates	Exorcist	
2026	99/66	Doctor	

== Television ==
Year	Title	Channel
2015–2017	Lakshmi Vanthachu	Zee Tamil
2017–2018	Nandini	Sun TV
2018–2020	Ponnukku Thanga Manasu	Star Vijay
2019	Lakshmi Stores	Sun TV
2019	Run	Sun TV
2021	Idhayathai Thirudathey	Colors Tamil
2021	Thalattu	Sun TV
2023–2026	Sakthivel: Theeyaai Oru Theeraa Kaadhal	Star Vijay
2025	Ponni	Star Vijay
2025	Gettimelam	Zee Tamil
2026	Sandhya Raagam	Zee Tamil
