= Prasanna GK =

Indian film editor

- Born: 16 December 1986 (age 39)
- Education: Madras Christian College, Chennai
- Occupation: Film editor
- Years active: 2010–present

Prasanna GK is an Indian film editor, working in Tamil cinema. He was a former assistant of ace film editor, A. Sreekar Prasad. He made his debut with Maari (2015).

== Career ==
Prasanna did his under-graduation at the Madras Christian College, before doing his diploma in editing and sound design at the LV Prasad Film and TV Academy. He assisted film editors Leo John Paul and T. S. Suresh before joining A. Sreekar Prasad. He made his debut with Maari (2015) and then formed a working relationship with Dhanush and subsequently edited Pa. Pandi (2017), Velaiilla Pattadhari 2 (2017), Maari 2 (2018), and Thiruchitrambalam (2023).

== Filmography ==
Key
†	Denotes films that have not yet been released

Year	Film	Notes
2015	Maari	
2016	Aviyal	
2017	Pa. Pandi	
2017	Rangoon	
2017	Maragadha Naanayam	
2017	Yaanum Theeyavan	
2017	Velaiilla Pattadhari 2	
2018	Iravaakaalam	
2018	Ghajinikanth	
2018	Maari 2	
2019	Sathru	
2019	Igloo	
2020	Taana	
2020	Sarbath	
2021	Blood Money	
2021	Nenjam Marappathillai	
2022	Maaran	
2022	FIR	
2022	Sila Nerangalil Sila Manidhargal	
2022	Thiruchitrambalam	
2022	Gatta Kusthi	
2023	Theera Kaadhal	
2023	Veeran	
2024	Ippadiku Kadhal	
2024	PT Sir	
2024	Raayan	
2025	Nilavuku En Mel Ennadi Kobam	
2025	Veera Dheera Sooran	
2025	Idli Kadai	
2026	Mr. X	
2026	DC	

== Awards ==
Year	Award	Film	Result	Ref.
2021	Blacksheep Digital Awards for Best Editor	Triples (2020 Web Series)	Won	
