= Iruttu Araiyil Murattu Kuththu =

2018 film

- Theatrical release poster
- Directed by: Santhosh P. Jayakumar
- Produced by: K. E. Gnanavel Raja
- Starring: Gautham Ram Karthik; Yaashika Aannand; Vaibhavi Shandilya; Chandrika Ravi; Shah Ra
- Cinematography: Ballu
- Edited by: Prasanna GK
- Music by: Balamurali Balu
- Production company: Blue Ghost Pictures
- Distributed by: Studio Green
- Release date: 4 May 2018
- Running time: 115 minutes
- Country: India
- Language: Tamil

Iruttu Araiyil Murattu Kuththu (lit. 'Fierce punch in a dark room'; coll. Fierce masturbation or sexual encounter (punch; euphemism) in a dark room) is a 2018 Indian Tamil-language adult horror comedy film written and directed by Santhosh P. Jayakumar and produced by K. E. Gnanavel Raja. The film stars Gautham Ram Karthik, Yashika Aannand, Vaibhavi Shandilya, Chandrika Ravi and Shah Ra. The music was composed by Balamurali Balu with cinematography by Ballu and editing by Prasanna GK. The film was released on 4 May 2018.

The film was later remade in Telugu as Chikati Gadilo Chithakotudu by Jayakumar himself, while a spiritual sequel Irandam Kuththu was released in November 2020.

== Plot ==
Veera is a playboy whom every potential bride rejects for that reason. Thendral accepts his marriage proposal with one condition. She demands that he impress her and take her on a trip to get to know each other better. She also suggests that he bring along another couple. Veera tells his friend Vasu, who says he has a girlfriend named Kavya, who is Veera's ex-girlfriend. When Kavya learns about Vasu's friendship with Veera, she vows to get her hands on him during the trip. The couple then travels to Pattaya, Thailand, and rents a bungalow. Their host asks them not to enter a particular room in that bungalow.

One day, Veera and Vasu accidentally consume Viagra, and when their girlfriends arrive earlier than expected, they run into the closed room to hide their arousal. There, they find a portrait of an underdressed woman and masturbate, thereby arousing a ghost. The ghost begins to haunt them. She reveals that she died in an accident as a virgin and will have sex with a virgin to rest her soul. Since both of them are virgins, they are unable to leave the house. The ghost makes several attempts to have sex with Vasu and Veera but fails. They make fun of the ghost, but all their plans go in vain as she takes the form of a beautiful woman.

Since Veera and Vasu's wives know the ghost is present, they call Jack and Rose, two conmen disguised as a church father and a nun, respectively. When Jack and Rose encounter the ghost, they also get trapped because they are virgins. To pacify the ghost, they hire a cook named Babyshri, who falls in love with Jack. Another virgin man named Girish Kalyan comes and gets trapped in the house. To execute the plan, they come up with a plan to have a party in which they invite boys and girls, hoping that one of them will be a virgin, but no one is. Veera thinks his playboy nature is responsible for all this fiasco and decides to have sex with the ghost. Veera almost seduces the ghost, but in the process, puts a fire boundary around the ghost on the advice of a Buddhist priest named Swamy. While Swamy controls the ghost, all the others (Veera-Thendral, Vasu-Kavya, Jack-Babyshri & Rose-Swamy's assistant) have sex and lose their virginities, which results in the ghost getting killed. While taming the ghost, it is revealed that Swamy and Girish are gay.

== Cast ==
- Gautham Ram Karthik as Veera
- Yaashika Aannand as Kavya
- Vaibhavi Shandilya as Thendral
- Chandrika Ravi as Ghost
- John Vijay as Swamy
- Rajendran as Jack
- Karunakaran as Girish Kalyan
- Bala Saravanan as Rose
- Shah Ra as Vasu
- Jangiri Madhumitha as Babyshri
- K. S. G. Venkatesh as Veera's father
- Dr. Arun Chinniah as House Owner
- Sri Latha as Thendral's mother
- Sreethu Krishnan as Veera's potential bride
- Arya in a special appearance

== Production ==
Following the success of the adult comedy Hara Hara Mahadevaki (2017), K. E. Gnanavel Raja chose to associate with director Santhosh P. Jayakumar and actor Gautham Karthik for another film in the same genre. Titled Iruttu Araiyil Murattu Kuththu, Santhosh stated it would be one of the first "adult horror comedy" films shot in the Tamil film industry. Production was briefly delayed due to the FEFSI strike in September 2017, but it duly began later that month. The makers initially attempted to cast Oviya in a lead role, following her rise to fame through the reality show Bigg Boss (2017), but she turned down the offer. Vaibhavi Shandilya was subsequently cast as the lead actress and began shooting for the film in Chennai for a five-day schedule. The team later moved to Thailand to shoot the rest of the film. Actresses Rashmi Gautham and Chandrika Ravi joined the team during the Thailand schedule, with Rashmi later replaced by Yaashika Aanand.

== Soundtrack ==
The soundtrack was composed by Balamurali Balu in his second collaboration with actor Gautham Karthik and director Santhosh P. Jayakumar.

Iruttu Araiyil Murattu Kuththu

Soundtrack album by Balamurali Balu
- Released: 2018
- Recorded: 2018
- Genre: Soundtrack
- Length: 12:56
- Label: Divo
- Producer: Balamurali Balu

Balamurali Balu chronology
Hara Hara Mahadevaki (2017)	Iruttu Araiyil Murattu Kuththu (2018)	Traffic Ramasamy (2018)

Track-List
No.	Title	Lyrics	Singer(s)	Length
1.	"Mokka Love Song"	Gaana Kadal, Santhosh P. Jayakumar	Anthony Daasan, Gaana Kadal	3:24
2.	"Maanam Pochi"	Gaana Kadal, Ku Karthik, Santhosh P. Jayakumar	Teejay Arunasalam, Gaana Kadal	3:25
3.	"IAMK Party Song"	Santhosh P. Jayakumar, Balamurali Balu, Ku Karthik	Adithya Surendar, Suchitra, Teejay Arunasalam, Vishnupriya Ravi	3:07
4.	"Azhukku Jatti Amudhavalli"	MC Vickey	MC Vickey	3:00
Total length:				12:56

== Reception ==
Thinkal Menon of The Times of India gave 3/5 stars, praising the cast's performances but criticizing the second half, horror, and songs. Kirubhakar Purushothaman of India Today gave 2.5/5 stars and wrote, "Iruttu Araiyil Murattu Kuththu is an adult comedy that is refreshing but not ground-breaking."

Vishal Menon of The Hindu wrote, "Iruttu Araiyil Murattu Kuththu, with all its problems, is still refreshing because at least it’s not hypocritical about what it wants to say, unlike some of our ‘U’-certified “family” films loaded with innuendo." Swetha Ramakrishnan of Firstpost wrote, "Iruttu Araiyil Murattu Kuththu caters strictly to a young audience, and makes no bones about it. If double entendre dialogues and crude gags are your idea of weekend fun at the movies, then IAMK may just do the trick."

== Release ==
Tamil Nadu theatrical rights of the film were sold for ₹5.25 crore.
