= Santhosh P. Jayakumar =

Indian film director

- Born: Santhosh Peter Jayakumar; 21 November 1988 (age 37)
- Other name: Santhosh Jayakumar
- Occupation: Film director
- Years active: 2015–present

Santhosh P. Jayakumar is an Indian film director and actor who works in Tamil and Telugu-language films.

== Career ==
Santhosh worked as an assistant to M. Saravanan before making his directorial debut with Gaddam Gang, the Telugu remake of the Tamil film Soodhu Kavvum (2013). He made his Tamil debut with Hara Hara Mahadevaki (2017) starring Gautham Karthik. Santhosh Jayakumar directed the privacy art Iruttu Araiyil Murattu Kuththu (2018) with Gautham Karthik again. The success of the film prompted him to direct the Telugu remake Chikati Gadilo Chithakotudu (2019) and begin production on a sequel titled Irandam Kuththu starring himself. In 2018, he briefly began working on a film titled Theemai Dhaan Vellum with Gautham Karthik, but the film was later dropped.

His upcoming film includes a thriller Pulanaivu with Arvind Swami.

== Personal life ==
Santhosh was born on 21 November 1988 in Chennai. Santhosh did his schooling in AV. Meiyappan MHSS, Virugambakkam.

== Filmography ==
Key
†	Denotes films that have not yet been released

As director and actor

Year	Film	Language	Notes				
Year	Film	Language	Notes	2015	Gaddam Gang	Telugu	credited as Santhosh Peter Jayakumar
2017	Hara Hara Mahadevaki	Tamil					
2018	Iruttu Araiyil Murattu Kuththu	Tamil					
2018	Ghajinikanth	Tamil					
2019	Chikati Gadilo Chithakotudu	Telugu	Remake of Iruttu Araiyil Murattu Kuththu				
2020	Irandam Kuththu	Tamil	Also actor				
2022	Poikaal Kuthirai	Tamil					
2024	The Boys	Tamil	Also actor and writer				

As lyricist

Year	Title	Song	Composer	Notes
2017	Hara Hara Mahadevaki	"Hara Hara Mahadevaki"	Balamurali Balu	Along with Balamurali Balu
2017	Hara Hara Mahadevaki	"Aaya Soathula"	Balamurali Balu	Along with Ku Karthik
2017	Hara Hara Mahadevaki	"Haiyo Konjam"	Vishal Chandrashekhar	Along with Gaana Kadal
