= Gautham Ram Karthik =

Indian film actor (born 1989)

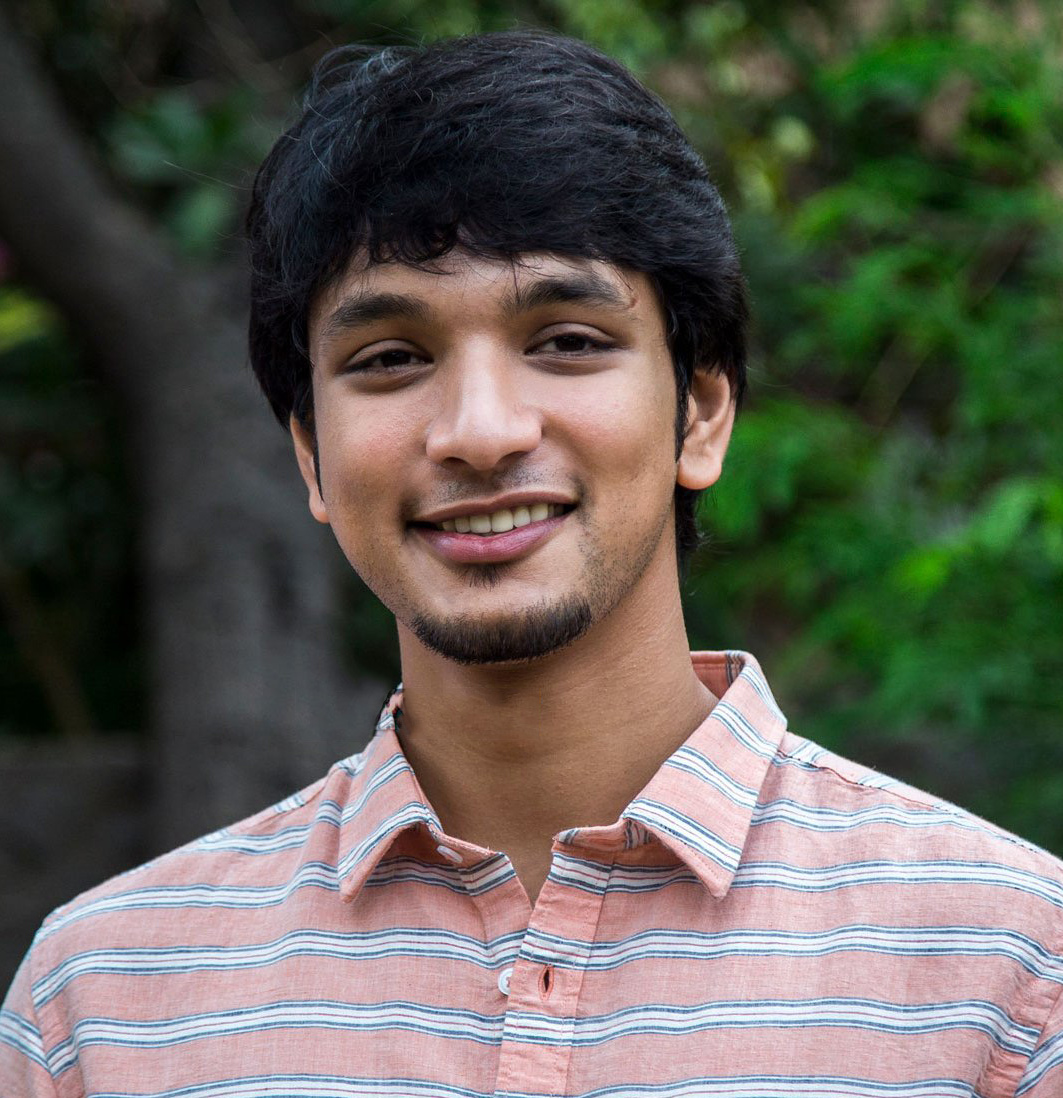
- Gautham at Rangoon Audio Launch
- Born: Gautham Ram Karthik; 12 September 1989 (age 37); Madras, Tamil Nadu, India
- Education: Christ University, Bengaluru
- Occupation: Actor
- Years active: 2013–present
- Spouse: Manjima Mohan (m. 2022)
- Father: Karthik
- Family: R. Muthuraman (Grandfather)

Gautham Ram Karthik (born 12 September 1989) is an Indian actor who works in Tamil-language films. He made his acting debut in Mani Ratnam's Kadal (2013). He is a recipient of one Filmfare Award South, a Tamil Nadu State Film Award and a SIIMA Award.

== Early life and background ==
Gautham Ram Karthik was born on 12 September 1989 to actor Karthik and his first wife, actress Ragini, who is a Toda tribal. Gautham's parents split when he was aged nine, and he subsequently grew up with his mother in Ooty, while his father only visited him once a year.

He graduated from Christ University, Bangalore, when film-maker Mani Ratnam approached him with an offer. He holds a bachelor's degree in Psychology, English & Media. In college, he performed as a guitarist and vocalist in the band, Dead End Street. He married actress Manjima Mohan, his co-star from Devarattam, on November 28, 2022.

== Career ==
=== 2013–2017 ===
Gautham revealed that he initially felt Ratnam had approached him to be a part of the technical crew and was surprised when he was handed the lead role. Gautham briefly took acting lessons from Kalairani and began to shoot for Kadal across regions in South India for close to a year. After the shootings were completed, he was introduced to the media at the music launch event for the Telugu version of the film in Hyderabad. The film opened in February 2013 to mixed reviews, though Gautham Karthik's performance of a deprived youngster caught between the characters played by Arvind Swamy and Arjun was unanimously praised. A critic noted "Gautham delivers in his very first film. He scores in action as well as dance department too", while a reviewer from Rediff.com wrote that the actor "pulled it off with elan", labelling him as "a natural performer and is surely here to stay". His second film, Yennamo Yedho, a remake of the Telugu film, Ala Modalaindi released in April 2014 to mixed reviews and a lukewarm box office, while Gautham's performance was praised by the critics. His next release was director Aishwarya Dhanush's Vai Raja Vai on 1 May 2015, which opened to positive reviews and was a commercial success. In 2017, he has worked in five films including, Muthuramalingam, Rangoon, Ivan Thanthiran, Hara Hara Mahadevaki and Indrajith.

=== 2018–present ===
Following, he has signed Oru Nalla Naal Paathu Solren (2018) which is to be directed by Arumuga Kumar and he is sharing screen space with Vijay Sethupathi for first time. After the box office success of Hara Hara Mahadevaki, Gautham Karthik and Santhosh P. Jayakumar are back with their next release, Iruttu Araiyil Murattu Kuththu (2018). The next one was with his father actor Karthik and his son come together on screen for the first time in Mr. Chandramouli (2018). Following, director M. Muthaiah known for his caste-based movies has joined with Gautham Karthik for a masala of violence coated with family sentiments in Devarattam (2019). Next, Gautham Karthik and director Cheran will be seen together on screen in Anandham Vilayadum Veedu (2021) directed by Nandha Periyasamy. He co-starred with R. Parthiban in Yutha Satham (2022) and Silambarasan in Pathu Thala (2023). The following is directed by Ponkumar, August 16 1947 (2023) stars Gautham Karthik in the lead role, and the film is produced by A. R. Murugadoss.

== Filmography ==
Key
†	Denotes films that have not yet been released

Year	Film	Role	Notes
2013	Kadal	Thomas	Won, Filmfare Award for Best Male Debut – South; Won, Vijay Award for Best Debut Actor; Won, SIIMA Award for Best Male Debutant
2014	Yennamo Yedho	Gautham	
2015	Vai Raja Vai	Karthik	Won, Tamil Nadu State Film Award Special Prize
2017	Muthuramalingam	Muthuramalingam	
2017	Rangoon	Venkat	
2017	Ivan Thanthiran	Shakthi	
2017	Hara Hara Mahadevaki	Hari	
2017	Indrajith	Indrajith	
2018	Oru Nalla Naal Paathu Solren	Harish	
2018	Iruttu Araiyil Murattu Kuththu	Veera	
2018	Mr. Chandramouli	Raaghav	
2019	Devarattam	Vetri	
2021	Anandham Vilayadum Veedu	Sakthivel	
2022	Yutha Satham	Nagulan	
2023	Pathu Thala	Guna / Sakthivel IPS	
2023	August 16 1947	Paraman	
2026	Mr. X	Amaran Chakaravarthi / "Lone Wolf"	
2026	Bloody Politics †	TBA	Post-production
2026	ROOT - Running Out Of Time †	TBA	Post-Production

=== Web series ===
Year	Title	Platform	Notes	Ref
TBA	Legacy	Netflix		

=== Voice actor ===
Year	Film	Role	Actor	Notes
2024	Amaran	Asif Wani	Rohman Shawl	
