= Disney (Indian director) =

Indian film director

- Born: V. K. Gnanasekar; Tamil Nadu, India
- Occupation: Film director
- Years active: 2011–present

V. K. Gnanasekar, known professionally as Disney, is an Indian film director, who has directed Tamil language films. He became known for the thriller drama Naan Sivanagiren (2011), and has gone on to make feature films including Irumbu Manithan (2020) and Kuttram Purinthal (2023).

== Career ==
Disney, then credited as V. K. Gnanasekar, made his directorial debut through the thriller drama Naan Sivanagiren (2011) featuring newcomers. He worked on the story, screenplay, dialogues and lyrics for the film. The film opened to negative reviews.

Disney then began work on Kuttram Purinthal, but its production delay meant that his next release was Irumbu Manithan (2020) starring Santhosh Prathap. The film opened to mixed reviews, with The Times of India giving the film 1.5 stars out of five stars. In contrast, the critic from Dina Thanthi praised the acting, direction, and story.

== Filmography ==
Films

Year	Film	Notes
2011	Naan Sivanagiren	
2020	Irumbu Manithan	
2023	Kuttram Purinthal	
