= Irumbu Manithan =

2020 Indian Tamil-language film

- Film poster
- Directed by: Disney
- Written by: Disney
- Produced by: Joseph Baby
- Starring: Santhosh Prathap; Archana
- Cinematography: K. Gokul
- Edited by: SP Ahamed
- Music by: K. S. Manoj
- Production company: Shankar Movies International
- Release date: 28 February 2020
- Running time: 137 minutes
- Country: India
- Language: Tamil

Irumbu Manithan (transl. Iron Man) is a 2020 Tamil language film written and directed by Disney and produced by Joseph Baby. The film stars Santhosh Prathap and Archana in the lead roles, while Ganja Karuppu and Madhusudhan Rao play supporting roles. The music was composed by K. S. Manoj with cinematography by K. Gokul and editing by S. P. Ahamed. The film released on 28 February 2020.

== Plot ==
A reporter interviews Munikannan, Sundaram's long-time friend and hostel manager, before the government honours an award for Sundaram to reveal Sundaram's life story and what he has done to receive this award.

Past: Sundaram is a happy-go-lucky man who lives with three boys. One night, Munikannan, a hungry thief, goes to Sundaram's food shop and looks for some food. He eats the parotta left for the rat. Sundaram goes to apprehend Munikannan, but he faints. Sundaram eventually wakes up Munikannan and asks him to pay for the parotta. Since he is penniless, Sundaram makes Munikannan wash the kitchen vessels. Sundaram always packs food for homeless people and enjoys them eating food. Munikannan reveals why he does that. As an eight-year-old child, Sundaram was hungry since no one fed him. While he is walking in the fields, he spots a 40-year-old homeless man eating his feces and begins to vomit. Sundaram, in his 30s, becomes a parotta cook in a kitchen. A customer becomes impressed with the parotta and gifts him a gold watch.

Madhusoodhanan has an ingenious plan to usurp hotels and restaurants in the town. Sundaram falls in love with a girl, Thenmozhi, and she eventually reciprocates. Madhusoodhanan visits Sundaram's hotel and tries to usurp his restaurant, but Sundaram sends him out. Madhusoodhanan warns Sundaram that he has seven days to change his decision and the restaurant board. Thenmozhi eventually proposes to Sundaram because of his good-hearted nature.

Sundaram visits Thenmozhi's family and reveals how he got his three boys. Sundaram adopted two young baby boys from the local church and named them Ramesh and Mahesh, and the third boy, Suresh, was from a pregnant beggar who died after childbirth. Sundaram forgets to give his ring and overhears Thenmozhi talking to her friend about how she will kick the orphans out after their marriage. She also insults Sundaram for adopting the boys. Sundaram goes back to see his restaurant on fire.

Madhusoodhanan apologises for setting his hotel on fire and warns him to look after his kids, or he will kill them. Sundaram threatens to kill Madhusoodhanan, so he hires goons to kill Sundaram, but Sundaram fights them. Sundaram calls off the marriage, so Thenmozhi tries to apologise to Sundaram, but he does not forgive her. She eventually marries someone else.

20 years later, Sundaram's children have reached adulthood. They are irresponsible and spend their father's money on drinks and parties. One day, Mahesh meets his girlfriend's father, who happens to be Madhusoodhanan, and becomes jealous. Munikannan spots Mahesh stealing his father's money, but Mahesh ignores Munikannan's lament. In the kitchen, Sundaram faints after inhaling kitchen smoke. Sundaram's sons then get Sundaram to sign a document. Sundaram confronts the boys angrily, but Madhusoodhanan's goons beat him, and Mahesh expels him from his business. Mahdusoodhanan reveals that Sundaram had signed a document splitting all the value of his assets (i.e., hotel, house, bank balance) among his three kids. Sundaram stays with Munikannan's family. Sundaram gets inspired when a shopkeeper says that food was medicine in the old days. He decides to open a restaurant serving healthy food. Sundaram's friend, the friendly customer, gifts him an old, derelict van, and they repair it and open it as a restaurant. Madhusoodhanan's business falls into despair, and Sundaram's business flourishes. Mahesh, Madhusoodhanan, Ramesh, and Suresh apologise to Sundaram, but he has decided not to assist them. Sundaram eventually buys Ramesh, Mahesh, and Suresh's properties at the auction. He unfortunately gets a massive stroke after arguing with Munikannan.

Present: Munikannan says that Sundaram succumbed to his brain stroke and died. He accepts the award on Sundaram's behalf and gives Suresh, Ramesh, and Mahesh a file, narrating that Sundaram leaves them a house they cannot sell and Rs. 5 crore as money. Munikannan reveals they are not Sundaram's biological children and tells their past. Munikannan says that Sundaram promised not to tell the truth, but he decides to tell them. Mahesh, Ramesh, and Suresh reform their ways and begin to look after Sundaram's business and the residents of Sundaram's retirement home.

== Cast ==
- Santhosh Prathap as Sundaram
- Archana as Thenmozhi
- Ganja Karuppu as Munikannan
- Madhusudhan Rao as Madhusoodhanan
- Nishanth
- Anitha Sampath as herself
- Poraali Dileepan
- Akhil Santhosh as Ramesh
- Dilip
- Dhanya
- Ranjan
- Parotta Murugesan
- Abu Salam
- Vipin
- Lishanth
- Kishore

== Production ==
Director Disney began working on a film that will take place in several time periods. This was his second film after Naan Sivanagiren (2011), which he directed under the name Gnanasekar. Archana, who was a part of Disney's unreleased Kuttram Purinthal, is a part of this film. Santhosh Prathap, Ganja Karuppu, and Madhusudhan Rao sport several looks in the film.

== Soundtrack ==
The soundtrack was composed by K. S. Manoj, collaborating with director Disney for the second time after Naan Sivanagiren. Silambarasan edited and sang the folk song "Don't Worry Pullingo". The song lyrics are written by Disney, Mohan Rajan, and Niranjan Bharathi.

Irumbu Manithan

Soundtrack album by K. S. Manoj
- Released: 2020
- Genre: Feature film soundtrack
- Length: 18:21
- Language: Tamil
- Label: Divo
- Producer: K. S. Manoj

K. S. Manoj chronology
Pathayeram Kodi (2013)	Irumbu Manithan (2020)	Kuttram Purinthal (2023)

Track listing
No.	Title	Lyrics	Singer(s)	Length
1.	"Don't Worry Pullingo"	Niranjan Bharathi	Silambarasan	3:45
2.	"Vaazhvo Oru Vaanavil"	Mohan Rajan	Sathyaprakash	4:05
3.	"Katthaadi Parakkavitta"	Mohan Rajan	Mookuthi Murugan	3:24
4.	"Pachaikili Parappathupola"	Disney	Ranjith	4:34
5.	"Vidhi Theeyendrarinthen"	Disney	Nivas	2:33

== Release ==
The film was released on 28 February 2020. The Times of India gave the film 1.5 stars out of five stars and criticized Sundaram's character arc while praising Ganja Karuppu's portrayal of Friday. Dina Thanthi praised the acting, direction, and story. Maalaimalar praised the film as a whole.
