= Kuttram Purinthal =

- Poster
- Directed by: Disney
- Starring: Adhik Babu; Archana; Abhinaya; M. S. Bhaskar
- Cinematography: K. Gokul
- Edited by: S. P. Ahamed
- Music by: K. S. Manoj
- Production company: Amaravathi Films Studios
- Release date: 24 February 2023
- Country: India
- Language: Tamil

Kuttram Purinthal (transl. If you understand the crime) is a 2023 Indian Tamil-language action drama film directed by Disney and starring Adhik Babu, Abhinaya and Archana, while M. S. Bhaskar plays a supporting role. The music was composed by K. S. Manoj with cinematography by K. Gokul and editing by S. P. Ahamed. The film was released on 24 February 2023.

== Cast ==
- Adhik Babu as Jeeva
- Archana as Divya
- Abhinaya as Uma
- M. S. Bhaskar
- Ramchandran Durairaj
- Aroul D. Shankar
- Nishanth
- Vetrivel Raaja
- Preetha
- Mugambikkai Ravi

== Production ==
Production on the film began in early 2018, with Abhinaya selected to portray a police officer. The film marked the debut of actor Aadhik Babu.

== Soundtrack ==
Kuttram Purinthal

Soundtrack album by K. S. Manoj
- Released: 2023
- Genre: Feature film soundtrack
- Length: 7:57
- Language: Tamil
- Label: MRT Music
- Producer: K. S. Manoj

K. S. Manoj chronology
Irumbu Manithan (2020)	Kuttram Purinthal (2023)	Thookudurai (2024)

The soundtrack was composed by K. S. Manoj, collaborating with Disney for the third time after Naan Sivanagiren (2011) and Irumbu Manithan (2020).

Track listing
No.	Title	Lyrics	Singer(s)	Length
1.	"Mazhai Thuli"	Kabilan	K. S. Manoj	3:53
2.	"Thoduvanam"	Karthik Netha	Anand Aravindakshan	4:04

== Reception ==
The film was released on 24 February 2023 across Tamil Nadu. A critic from Dina Thanthi gave the film a mixed review while praising twists introduced into the screenplay of the film.
