= Trigger (2022 film) =

2022 film directed by Sam Anton

- Theatrical release poster
- Directed by: Sam Anton
- Written by: Dialogues: P. S. Mithran; R. Savarimuthu; Sam Anton
- Screenplay by: Sam Anton
- Story by: Sam Anton
- Produced by: Prateek Chakravorty; Shruti Nallappa
- Starring: Atharvaa; Tanya Ravichandran; Arun Pandian
- Cinematography: Krishnan Vasant
- Edited by: Ruben
- Music by: Ghibran
- Production companies: Pramod Films; Miracle Movies
- Distributed by: Romeo Pictures
- Release date: 23 September 2022
- Country: India
- Language: Tamil

Trigger is a 2022 Indian Tamil-language action thriller film written and directed by Sam Anton and produced by Prateek Chakravorty and Shruti Nallappa under the banner of Pramod Films and Miracle Movies. The film stars Atharvaa in the lead role, alongside Tanya Ravichandran, Arun Pandian, Rahul Dev Shetty, Munishkanth, Chinni Jayanth and Azhagam Perumal in supporting roles. The music was composed by Ghibran, while cinematography and editing were handled by Krishnan Vasant and Ruben.

Trigger marks the second collaboration of Atharvaa and Sam Anton after 100. It was predominantly shot in Chennai and Hyderabad. The film was released in theatres on 23 September 2022.

== Plot ==
Prabhakaran "Prabha", a daring and dashing cop, is suspended after he decides to rescue an informer instead of aborting that mission, going against the direct order of the Commissioner. However, he gets posted into the Internal Affairs of the Tamil Nadu Police Department, by the Commissioner. Along with a team of 4 other suspended police officers, he is posted at a restaurant that masquerades as their base of operations. They are to constantly monitor the policemen in the city, looking especially for the morally compromised cops.

Meanwhile, his elder brother, Karthi, and sister-in-law decide to adopt a child after years of trying to conceive one. They decide to adopt Nisha, after observing how close she is to their family, thanks to Janani, Prabha's love interest, who works at the same orphanage. However, on the day that Nisha is to be officially adopted into Prabha's family, she is kidnapped. While investigating, Prabha learns about the modus operandi of the kidnappers and manages to track down the kidnapper's Audi car to a warehouse, where he attacks the kidnapper, Aadhi, and saves Nisha.

Prabha admits Aadhi to the hospital and uses him as a bait to capture his mysterious leader. Upon deducing this, the leader manages to kill Aadhi, despite surveillance by Prabha and his team. As Prabha starts digging into the case, he learns that the kidnappings are connected to an attack at the Commissioner's office in 1993 by a gangster named Michael, who is actually Aadhi's father and also the mysterious leader. He finds that his father, Sathya Moorthy, a former SI and now an Alzheimer patient, had dealt with the case earlier.

It is revealed that in 1993, Michael actually was running a human trafficking racket by asking his henchmen to pretend as parents and adopt the children from the orphanage, where they hand over the children to Michael after 3 years, in exchange for money. However, a couple filed a complaint about Michael's illegal activities to Sathya Moorthy, who gathered evidence against him. When Sathya Moorthy reached the commissioner's office to provide the evidence, Michael attacked and burned the commissioner's office, where Sathya Moorthy was hit on the head in the process and lost his memory shortly after the incident. Michael was arrested on petty charges, while Sathya Moorthy was ultimately suspended and ostracized.

After having learned about Prabha's identity, Michael kidnaps 20 children randomly in broad daylight and tells the parents to provide money for their safe return at a public restaurant. While Prabha's team leader Deva and his team waits at the bar to nab them, Prabha finds out that one of the adopted children's parents are actually Michael's henchmen. He immediately calls his colleagues and asks them to protect Janani and the children at the orphanage. However, one of his colleagues, Perumal, is ultimately killed after taking down Michael's men. Prabha stays back at the parents's house where he defeats Michael's men and learns that Deva and his team are in trouble at the restaurant, where the parents are dropping off the ransom money.

At the restaurant, Prabha realizes that Deva, his colleague and friend from the police department, is Michael's son and the mole in the department. Prabha is shot and left for dead, but he survives by falling into the garbage chute. Nisha is kidnapped again, but Prabha and his colleagues analyse the place where Michael is taking the children and tracks down the bus, however, Nisha is not present. Sathya tracks down and chases a concrete truck, with Deva in it, containing Michael's next consignment of children to be trafficked. Ultimately, he manages to rescue them and kill Deva. Enraged, Michael arrives at Sathya Moorthy's house, along with Nisha, to kill them, but Sathya Moorthy manages to regain some of his memories and shoots Michael to death. The children are safely brought back to the orphanage.

== Cast ==
- Atharvaa as Prabhakaran IPS
- Tanya Ravichandran as Janani, Prabhakaran's love interest
- Rahul Dev Shetty as Michael
- Arun Pandian as SI Sathya Moorthy, Prabhakaran's father
- Munishkanth as Killi
- Chinni Jayanth as Perumal
- Pradeep Benetto Rayan as Deva
- Azhagam Perumal as police commissioner
- Aranthangi Nisha as Revathi
- Anbu Thasan as Aashiq
- Five Star Krishna as Karthi, Prabhakaran's brother
- Vinodhini Vaidyanathan as Shree, Karthi's wife
- Seetha as Lakshmi, Prabhakaran and Karthi's mother
- Baby Dhikshitha Diwakar as Nisha
- Vikram Anand as Aadhi
- Sampath Ram as DCP Karunakaran

== Production ==
The film was tentatively titled as Atharvaa 17. On 15 November 2021, the film's official title was unveiled as Trigger.

== Music ==
Trigger

Soundtrack album by M. Ghibran
- Released: 2022
- Recorded: 2022
- Genre: Feature film soundtrack
- Length: 7:30
- Language: Tamil
- Label: Think Music India

M. Ghibran chronology
Dejavu (2022)	Trigger (2022)	Naan Mirugamaai Maara (2022)

Singles from Trigger
- 1. "Scooby Doobaa" Released: 25 August 2022; 2. "Trigger (Theme Song)" Released: 24 September 2022 (After the film's release)

Ghibran composed the soundtrack and background score of the film. The audio rights were acquired by Think Music India. The first single "Scooby Doobaa" was released on 25 August 2022. The second single "Trigger-Theme Song" was released on 24 September 2022 after the film's release.

Track listing
No.	Title	Lyrics	Singer(s)	Length
1.	"Scooby Doobaa"	Mirchi Vijay	Kapil Kapilan	3:53
2.	"Trigger" (Theme Song)	Bmac Mastamind	Vamanaa, Bmac Mastamind	2:37
Total length:				7:30

== Release ==
=== Theatrical ===
Trigger was released theatrically on 23 September 2022. The distribution rights of the film in Tamil Nadu were acquired by Rahul under the banner of Romeo Pictures.

=== Home media ===
The post-theatrical streaming rights were sold to Aha, where it began streaming from 14 October 2022.

== Reception ==
=== Critical response ===
M. Suganth of The Times of India gave 3/5 stars and wrote "Sam Anton teams up with Atharvaa again to give us an almost edge-of-the-seat action thriller that has enough smartness to keep us hooked". Thinkal Menon of OTTPlay gave 2/5 stars and wrote "Despite sufficient opportunities in hand to make an engaging action drama with ample dose of relatable emotions, makers couldn't cash in on it." Navein Darshan of Cinema Express gave 2/5 stars and wrote "Trigger would have been the powerful entertainer it aspires to be if these characters were fleshed out well in a screenplay free of distractions."
