= Maaveeran (2023 film) =

2023 Indian film by Madonne Ashwin

- Theatrical release poster
- Directed by: Madonne Ashwin
- Written by: Madonne Ashwin; Chandhru Anbazhagan (dialogues)
- Produced by: Arun Viswa
- Starring: Sivakarthikeyan; Aditi Shankar; Mysskin
- Cinematography: Vidhu Ayyanna
- Edited by: Philomin Raj
- Music by: Bharath Sankar
- Production company: Shanthi Talkies
- Distributed by: Red Giant Movies
- Release date: 14 July 2023
- Running time: 166 minutes
- Country: India
- Language: Tamil
- Budget: ₹35 crore
- Box office: est.₹89 crore

Maaveeran (transl. The Great Warrior) is a 2023 Indian Tamil-language political superhero film directed by Madonne Ashwin and produced by Shanti Talkies. The film stars Sivakarthikeyan in the titular role, alongside Aditi Shankar, Saritha, Mysskin, Monisha Blessy, Yogi Babu and Sunil. In the film, a cartoonist starts hearing a voice after an accident, which tries to make him kill a corrupt minister.

The film was officially announced in July 2022 under the official title Maaveeran, and was later, near release, subtitled Veerame Jeyam. Principal photography commenced in August 2022. It was shot predominantly in Chennai, along with Pondicherry, and wrapped by early-June 2023. The music was composed by Bharath Sankar, with cinematography and editing handled by Vidhu Ayyanna and Philomin Raj respectively.

Maaveeran was initially scheduled to release on 11 August 2023, but was preponed to avoid a clash with Jailer. The film was released on 14 July 2023 to positive reviews and became a commercial success.

== Plot ==
Sathya is a comic book artist who writes and illustrates a comic strip about a brave warrior named Maaveeran for the Tamil newspaper Dhina Thee. However, he is also a coward who has been unable to stand up for himself ever since his father was killed several years ago in his fight against the existing system. He allows an employee at Dhina Thee to take credit for Maaveeran due to his cowardice. Nila, a sub-editor at the paper and a journalist, takes a stand on Sathya's behalf, securing the same job that the previous sub-editor misused his skills for. Eventually, they both fall in love.

Sathya and his family, comprising his widowed mother, Eshwari, and younger sister, Raji, along with his neighbours, are forced to move out of their slum and relocate to a high-rise apartment building by the Government of Tamil Nadu to improve their living conditions. But within a few hours of moving in, the apartment's flaws get exposed because of shoddy construction, crumbling walls due to unstable foundation, broken doors, poorly installed windows, and the ceiling falling apart. Eshwari confronts the contractor, Dhanraj, and the local councillor Paguthi.

A drunk Dhanraj enters Sathya's apartment unnoticed by Eshwari and force opens the bathroom door while Raji is inside, taking a shower. Sathya gets home and panics at the site of the messy condition of his apartment. He learns what Dhanraj had done to his sister and how Dhanraj hit his mother for questioning him. Enraged, Sathya goes to Dhanraj carrying a pencil as a weapon, but he and his goons humiliate and threaten him.

Sathya returns home to find his mother ashamed of his cowardly nature and decides to die. He attempts suicide by jumping from the top floor of an apartment but decides not to after a moment of contemplation. However, he slips and falls, causing a serious head injury. Kumar, Eshwari, and Raji admit him to the hospital. Sathya's condition gets critical as per the doctor and then he dies, but suddenly he wakes up while being alright even after being in critical condition just before. Upon waking, Sathya experiences a mysterious voice, speaking like the narrator of the Maaveeran strip, that guides him in making decisions, including fighting the corrupt Housing Minister, M. N. Jeyakodi.

Sathya, guided by a mysterious voice, exposes the poor construction of an apartment, making him a hero among the residents. Jeyakodi's secretary, Paramu, learns of the mysterious voice guiding Sathya and Sathya's reluctance to fight Jeyakodi and decides to use it to benefit Jeyakodi. Paramu forces Sathya to reveal the voice on live television, forcing him to fight Jeyakodi and claim the apartment's construction is good, framing Sathya as "mentally unstable," and the building people throw his family. Jeyakodi refuses to forgive Sathya and thrashes him, but Sathya refuses to fight back. The voice stops, claiming Sathya betrayed his family and the apartment dwellers for his gain.

Sathya returns to find his family homeless and feels guilty for leaving them homeless. He decides to create his own story and expose the unsafe construction of an apartment complex. In the process, Sathya steals the building inspection documents from Jeyakodi. However, Jeyakodi kills Paramu when he advises him to reveal the apartment's collapse and evacuate the dwellers. He asks his henchmen to drown Sathya and Paramu's bodies in the sea. Sathya drowns himself, and he starts hearing the mysterious voice again. He fights the henchmen and returns to the apartment, where he unsuccessfully tries to convince the dwellers to evacuate the building as it could collapse at any moment. Jayakodi comes and convinces the dwellers that everything will be fixed after the election.

Sathya mocks Jeyakodi and challenges him to stay in the apartment if he is confident it won't collapse. A fight ensues, and Sathya fights off Jayakodi's henchmen without the voice's support. The dwellers believe Sathya and evacuate just in time. The building starts collapsing, with the apartment sign fatally falling on Jeyakodi, killing him. Sathya saves his neighbour's daughter, Ilavarasi, but the apartment collapses, leaving Sathya inside. The dwellers search for Sathya, who is found beneath the rubble, seemingly dead.

Two years later, with another government in place, the apartment is rebuilt with dwellers in a loop and strong construction. Sathya miraculously survives the collapse and works for Dhina Thee, writing and illustrating Maaveeran. However, the incident permanently deafens him, but his reflexes sharpen. Ilavarasi questions Sathya's survival, and it becomes clear that the enigmatic voice has reappeared, breathing life back into him in the aftermath of the collapse.

== Cast ==
- Sivakarthikeyan as Sathya, a talented cartoonist
- Aditi Shankar as Nila, Sathya's love interest and journalist sub-editor of the newspaper company Dhina Thee
- Saritha as Eshwari, Sathya's and Raji's mother
- Mysskin as Housing Minister M. N. Jeyakodi
- Monisha Blessy as Raji, Sathya's sister
- Soundararaja as Vetri
- Sunil as Paramu, Jeyakodi's secretary and friend
- Yogi Babu as Kumar, a construction worker
- Dileepan as Selvam
- Semmalar Annam as Selvi
- Balaji Sakthivel as Chief Minister
- Kanna Ravi as Anwar
- Minor Yogi as Thannarasu
- Madhankumar Dhakshinamoorthy as Dhanraj
- Pazhani Murugan as Paguthi
- Douglas Kumaramoorthy as Junior Engineer
- Suresh Chakravarthi as Psychiatrist
- Jeeva Ravi as Nila's father
- Vijay Sethupathi as The Voice, narrator for Sathya (voiceover)
- Ravi Teja as The Voice, narrator for Sathya (voiceover for Telugu dubbed version)

== Production ==
=== Development ===
In December 2021, it was reported that Sivakarthikeyan had signed his next venture after Don (2022) and his film with K. V. Anudeep, which became Prince (2022). Madonne Ashwin, who previously directed the critically acclaimed 2021 film Mandela, was reported to direct the venture, while Ishari K. Ganesh, under the banner of Vels Films International, would produce it and production was set to begin in July 2022. On 15 July, Arun Viswa of Shanti Talkies officially announced the project, stating he would produce it. The official title, Maaveeran, was announced the same day. Bharath Shankar, who worked with Ashwin for Mandela, was chosen to compose the score, while Vidhu Ayyanna was chosen to handle the cinematography. A muhurat puja was held on 3 August with the presence of the film's cast and crew at a film city in Chennai.

=== Casting ===
Sivakarthikeyan played a cartoonist named Sathya, who starts hearing a voice in his head after an accident. In June 2022, Mysskin was reported to play the antagonist. His commitments to the film was confirmed in August. Kiara Advani was reported to play the lead female, however, in August, Aditi Shankar was announced playing a lead role, doing so for second time after Viruman (2022). Along with Aditi, Saritha was also announced doing a role in the film. She was last seen in Ceylon (2013), marking Maaveeran as her 10-year comeback to the film industry. Maaveeran marked the eighth collaboration of Yogi Babu and Sivakarthikeyan. Telugu actor Sunil made his full-fledged Tamil debut through this film although he had earlier signed on to appear in Japan (2023), which was released after this film. Monisha Blessy made her acting debut through this film. Vijay Sethupathi was cast for a voice role, and charged no remuneration.

=== Filming ===
"The film is set in and around Chennai, and so, the looks of these characters will be in alignment with that. We are planning to shoot the film in two-three schedules, on a single stretch, with small breaks in between."

— Arun Viswa, producer of Maaveeran, in an interview with The Times of India.

Maaveeran was launched in Chennai with a customary pooja function on 17 July 2022. Principal photography began on 3 August 2022 with the entire cast and crew in Chennai. After a month, filming was halted for a week. There were reports that filming had stopped due to creative differences between Sivakarthikeyan and Ashwin. But the real reason was heavy rain. Filming ultimately resumed on 7 November. By 23 November 40% of the film was shot and by 8 December, about 60% of the film's shooting was completed. Also, an important schedule of action sequences was completed on 10 December which was choreographed by Hollywood stunt director Yannick Ben.

The behind-the-scenes of a song from the film, "Scene Ah Scene Ah", revealed that it was shot with a mocobot camera, making Maaveeran the fifth Tamil film to do so after Beast (2022), Vikram (2022), Thunivu (2023) and Japan (2023). The crew then started filming for 20 consecutive days in Ennore by the end of February with majority of the portions being shot at night. The final schedule of filming began on 17 March in Pondicherry. A huge set resembling a huge boat was erected there. Sivakarthikeyan finished filming for his portions on 27 March. Principal photography wrapped after shooting some patch works by 3 June.

=== Post-production ===
Sivakarthikeyan started dubbing his portions in late May 2023 and finished in early June. Aditi started dubbing for her portions in early-June.

== Themes and influences ==
The internal conflict of the protagonist Sathya, who keeps denying that he has to fight for his people's rights, was compared by Ashwin to breaking the fourth wall in Stranger than Fiction and Ober (both 2006).

== Soundtrack ==
The soundtrack and background score were composed by Bharath Sankar in his first collaboration with Sivakarthikeyan and second with Madonne after Mandela. The audio rights were bagged by Saregama. The first single "Scene Ah Scene Ah" was released on 17 February 2023, on the occasion of Sivakarthikeyan's birthday. The second single "Vannarapettayila" was released on 14 June, and the third single "Vaa Veera" on 7 July.

Maaveeran

Soundtrack album by Bharath Sankar
- Released: 2023
- Genre: Feature film soundtrack
- Length: 14:36
- Language: Tamil
- Label: Saregama
- Producer: Bharath Sankar

Bharath Sankar chronology
| Yaanai Mugathaan (2023) | Maaveeran (2023) | Anbe Diana (2026) |

Track listing
| No. | Title | Lyrics | Singer(s) | Length |
|---|---|---|---|---|
| 1. | "Scene Ah Scene Ah" | Kabilan, C. M. Lokesh | Anirudh Ravichander | 5:17 |
| 2. | "Vannarapettayila" | Yugabharathi | Sivakarthikeyan, Aditi Shankar | 3:42 |
| 3. | "Vaa Veera" | Yugabharathi | Vaikom Vijayalakshmi, Bharath Sankar | 5:37 |
| 4. | "Kekkutha" (Boat Fight Song) | Vishnu Edavan | Bharath Sankar, Prashanth Mohanasundaram | 2:27 |
| 5. | "Climax Fight Theme" | Madonne Ashwin | - | 2:22 |
| 6. | "Maaveeran Theme" | - | - | 2: 10 |
| Total length: | | | | 14:36 |

== Release ==
Maaveeran released theatrically on 14 July 2023. The film was initially scheduled for release on 11 August 2023, however, to avoid a box office clash with Jailer, the makers advanced it to 14 July. The distribution rights for the film in Tamil Nadu were bought by Red Giant Movies and in Andhra Pradesh and Telangana states by Asian Cinemas.

=== Home media ===
The film's streaming rights were acquired by Amazon Prime Video for ₹33 crore, while the satellite rights were sold to Sun TV Network. The film began streaming on Amazon Prime Video from 11 August 2023 in Tamil, along with dubbed versions in Telugu and Hindi languages.

== Reception ==
Maaveeran received positive reviews from critics. On the review aggregator website Rotten Tomatoes, 100% of 6 critics' reviews are positive, with an average rating of 7/10.

Soundarya Athimuthu of The Quint gave 4 out of 5 and wrote that "'Sivakarthikeyan’s well-crafted fantasy action entertainer." M Suganth of The Times of India gave the film 3 out of 5 and wrote "Sivakarthikeyan shines in an engaging but overlong fantasy entertainer." Janaki K. of India Today gave the film 3.5 out of 5 and wrote "Maaveeran is yet another solid entertainer that makes you enjoy and retrospect. It brings forth prevailing issues, such as corruption, poverty and petty politics. But, it is also a character study of how people will have to revolt for their basic rights."

Swami Ji Bhuvanesh Chandar of The Hindu wrote "Maaveeran is a story about the inner voice that asks you to do the right thing, driving home a point to those who turn a blind eye until the waves crash their homes; Siva aces this high-concept actioner that also respects commercial cinema sensibilities." Kirubhakar Purushothaman of The Indian Express gave the film 3 out of 5 and wrote "Sivakarthikeyan’s superhero film is good but predictable." Swathi P Ajith of Onmanorama wrote "All in all, Maaveeran is an immensely captivating and enjoyable film, which can arguably be seen as Sivakarthikeyan's comeback in Tamil cinema."

Sowmya Rajendran of The News Minute gave the film 3.5 out of 5 and wrote "Sivakarthikeyan’s superhero film is simple and mostly fun." P Sangeetha of OTTplay gave the film 3.5 out of 5, stating, "Madonne Ashwin's Maaveeran is laced with a gripping screenplay, hilarious one-liners, mass moments and some fantastic performances. While the role of Sathya seems to be tailor-made for Sivakarthikeyan, Yogi Babu, Mysskin and Saritha's performances, too, pack a punch. Needless to say, Vijay Sethpathi's voiceover elevates the film to a different level. In short, Maaveeran is a delight to watch."

Sudhir Srinivasan of Cinema Express gave the film 3.5 out of 5 stars, stating, "It's a time in our cinema when talented filmmakers like Madonne Ashwin are showing that they are unafraid of punching up." Priyanka Sundar of Firstpost rated the film 3.5 out of 5, stating, "Director Madonne Ashwin has taken a simple story of a man finding courage during dark times and made it into a comedy that left the theatre echoing rousing cheers and loud laughter." Ananda Vikatan gave the film 45 out of 100. Krishna Selvaseelan of Tamil Guardian awarded the film 3.5 out of 5 stars, writing, "'Maaveeran' is an entertaining film; it has the usual blend of what the Tamil audience loves about the masala formula, with a twist to the tale which elevates the narrative."

== See also ==
- List of Indian superhero films
