= Yaanai Mugathaan =

2023 Indian fantasy comedy film

- Theatrical release poster
- Directed by: Rejishh Midhila
- Written by: Rejishh Midhila
- Produced by: Rejishh Midhila; Lijo James
- Starring: Yogi Babu; Ramesh Thilak; Urvashi; Karunakaran
- Cinematography: Karthik S Nair
- Edited by: Syalo Sathyan
- Music by: Bharath Sankar
- Production company: The Great Indian Cinemas
- Distributed by: UFO Moviez India Limited
- Release date: 21 April 2023
- Country: India
- Language: Tamil

Yaanai Mugathaan (Note: The film's title refers to God Vinayakar, who has an elephant face. The lead actor, Yogi Babu, plays the role of God Vinayagar.) (transl. Elephant-faced God) is a 2023 Indian Tamil-language fantasy comedy written and directed by Rejishh Midhila. The film stars Yogi Babu and Ramesh Thilak with Urvashi, Karunakaran, Uday Chandra and Naaga Vishaal in supporting roles. The film is a remake of the director's Innu Muthal.

The film is about an auto driver who is a devotee of Lord Ganesha. The film was released on 21 April 2023.

== Plot ==
The film revolves around an ardent Lord Ganesha devotee Ganesan who is also a lazy wastrel, who survives lying and cheating people. He has only two souls to support, one is his friend Michael who is also a wastrel. The other person is Malli Akka who supports him and his friend with finance and home. One day Lord Ganesha comes before Ganesan and questions his way of life. How Ganesan mends his way and realises life forms rest of the movie.

== Cast ==
- Yogi Babu as Lord Ganesan, Vinayakar
- Ramesh Thilak as Ganesan
- Urvashi as Malli Akka
- Karunakaran as Michael
- Uday Chandra as Gulam Rana Mohames
- Hareesh Peradi as Ranganan
- Naga Vishal as Muthu
- Crane Manohar as Mani Annan
- Yogendra Singh Rathore as Yogeshwar
- Edwin Anthony as Vicki
- Bairavan as Rajendran
- Kulappulli Leela as Matha Bhairavi Mangatha

== Production ==
This is the Tamil debut of Malayalam film director Rejishh Midhila. The director, Rejishh Midhila, produced the film with Lijo James. The cinematography was by cinematographer Karthik S Nair. The film's editing was handled by Syalo Sathyan.

== Music ==
Yaanai Mugathaan

Soundtrack album by Bharath Sankar
- Released: 2023
- Recorded: 2022–2023
- Genre: Feature film soundtrack
- Length: 11:44
- Language: Tamil
- Label: Sony Music India
- Producer: Bharath Sankar

Bharath Sankar chronology
Ammu (2022)	Yaanai Mugathaan (2023)	Maaveeran (2023)

The music for the film was composed by Bharath Sankar. This is a second collaboration between the music composer and actor Yogi Babu after the film Mandela. All songs were penned by C. M. Lokesh.

Track listing
No.	Title	Lyrics	Singer(s)	Length
1.	"Dhoora Vaaney"	C. M. Lokesh	Sathyaprakash Dharmar	4:20
2.	"Aala Aala"	C. M. Lokesh	Anthony Daasan	3:34
3.	"Dhoora Vaaney"	C. M. Lokesh	Bharath Sankar	3:50
Total length:				11:44

== Release ==
The film was released on 21 April 2023.

== Reception ==
Logesh Balachandran of The Times of India rated the film three out of five stars and wrote, "Although Yaanai Mugathaan reminds us of other films such as Arai En 305-il Kadavul and Vinodhaya Sitham, it successfully manages to keep us engrossed in the world it has created." Jayabhuvaneshwari B of Cinema Express gave the film a rating of two out of five stars and wrote that "While the message is a well-intentioned one, the aimless writing makes the denouement unsatisfying."

P Sangeetha of OTTplay rated the film two out of five stars and wrote that "This Yogi Babu and Ramesh Thilak fantasy comedy, which has its heart in the right place, is marred by a vague storyline that hardly evinces any interest or empathy for the characters." A critic from Dinamalar gave the film a rating of two out of five stars and opined that the story the director chose was interesting, but the screenplay is not interesting enough.
