= Enakku Innoru Per Irukku =

2016 Indian Tamil-language action comedy film by Sam Anton

- Theatrical release poster
- Directed by: Sam Anton
- Written by: Sam Anton
- Produced by: A. Subashkaran
- Starring: G. V. Prakash Kumar; Anandhi
- Cinematography: Krishnan Vasant
- Edited by: Ruben
- Music by: G. V. Prakash Kumar
- Production company: Lyca Productions
- Release date: 17 June 2016
- Running time: 130 minutes
- Country: India
- Language: Tamil

Enakku Innoru Per Irukku (transl. I Have Another Name) is a 2016 Indian Tamil-language mafia comedy film directed by Sam Anton starring G. V. Prakash Kumar (who also composed the music) and Anandhi in the lead roles. Produced by Subaskaran Allirajah, who is from Lyca Productions, the film began production in December 2015 and ended in March 2016. It was released on 17 June 2016.

== Plot ==
Johnny is a happy-go-lucky man who is mistaken as a notorious gangster by his lover Hema's father Dass alias Naina, an ageing gangster who wants a person to replace him as the Naina in Royapuram and become his son-in-law. Johnny has a disease which causes him to repeat his previous words if he sees blood. How Johnny eliminates his rivals and becomes the next Naina forms the rest of the story.

== Cast ==
- G. V. Prakash Kumar as Johnny
- Anandhi as Hema (Dhanam)
- Saravanan as Doss (Naina)
- Karunas as Finger Babu
- Charle as Subbiah
- VTV Ganesh as Benjamin
- Rajendran as Mahabali Maha
- Nirosha as Dhanam
- Yogi Babu as Ondi Puli
- Swaminathan as Auto driver
- Lollu Sabha Manohar as Asirvatham
- Lawrence Ramu as Durai (Naina)
- Shanmugam Muthusamy as chappai
- Vijay Varadharaj as Glory
- Mansoor Ali Khan (Cameo appearance)
- Ponnambalam (Cameo appearance)
- Kishore Rajkumar as Cameo appearance

== Production ==
Following the success of their previous collaboration, Darling (2015), director Sam Anton and actor G. V. Prakash Kumar began pre-production work on a film titled Kaipulla to be produced by Studio Green. However, the studio later backed out of the film. Lyca Productions revealed that they would produce the project during November 2015, and that it would become their second venture after Kaththi (2014).

The team held an official launch on 15 December 2015 and the first schedule subsequently began later that day, with the film developing under the working title of Enakku Innoru Per Irukku, a line taken from the film, Baashha (1995), which later became the official title. Filming wrapped in March 2016.

== Soundtrack ==
The music is composed by G. V. Prakash Kumar. It includes a remix of the song "Kannai Nambathey", composed by M. S. Viswanathan for the 1975 Tamil film Ninaithadhai Mudippavan.

Enakku Innoru Per Irukku

Soundtrack album by G. V. Prakash Kumar
- Released: 2016
- Genre: Feature film soundtrack
- Length: 22:42
- Language: Tamil
- Producer: G. V. Prakash Kumar

G. V. Prakash Kumar chronology
| Theri (2016) | Enakku Innoru Per Irukku (2016) | Meendum Oru Kadhal Kathai (2016) |

Track listing
| No. | Title | Lyrics | Singer(s) | Length |
|---|---|---|---|---|
| 1. | "Kannai Nambathey" | Na. Muthukumar | Gana Bala | 4:21 |
| 2. | "Myma" | Arunraja Kamaraj | G. V. Prakash Kumar | 3:49 |
| 3. | "Dance With Me" | Ekadasi | G. V. Prakash Kumar, Priyanka | 4:43 |
| 4. | "Thathalakka" | | Grace Karunas | 3:32 |
| 5. | "Theme Music" | — | — | 0:34 |
| Total length: | | | | 16:59 |

== Critical reception ==
Chennai Vision wrote, "To sum it up, Enakku Innoru Per Irukku, despite its loophools and pitfalls, is a highly entertaining movie. Foget the logic and enjoy the magic, if your choice for the weekend is a value for money timepass entertainer". Gautaman Bhaskaran of Hindustan Times wrote, "With performances either wooden, like in the case of Kumar or exaggerated from the rest of the cast, Anton’s 130-minute movie turns into a merry-go-round with the images spinning all around it in mindless medley of incidents". Baradwaj Rangan wrote a negative review for The Hindu.
