= Dennis Manjunath =

Indian film director

- Occupation: Film director
- Years active: 2021–present

Dennis Manjunath is an Indian film director known for his work in Tamil cinema.

== Career ==
Dennis Manjunath made his directorial debut with Trip, marking his entry into Tamil cinema. He later directed Thookudurai in 2024, which was set in a rural backdrop and starred Yogi Babu. He subsequently worked on Manithan Deivamagalam starring Selvaraghavan.

== Filmography ==
Year	Film	Notes
2021	Trip	
2024	Thookudurai	
2026	Manithan Deivamagalam	
