= Vidhu Ayyanna =

Indian cinematographer

- Notable work: Maaveeran (2023)

Vidhu Ayyanna is an Indian cinematographer who predominantly works in the Tamil film industry.

== Career ==
Vidhu's collaboration with Madonne Ashwin began with the film Mandela. Vidhu drew inspiration from various sources, including the French painting Liberty Leading the People for Maaveeran's climax, aiming to project a revolution. For Mandela, the African beats in Bharath Sankar's music inspired Vidhu to use warm, earthy tones and darker skin tones, drawing from African aesthetics.

Vidhu is currently working on Bhanu Bhogavarapu's directorial debut, Mass Jathara.

== Filmography ==
As cinematographer
Year	Title	Language	Refs
2017	Meyaadha Maan	Tamil	
2019	LKG	Tamil	
2020	Oh My Kadavule	Tamil	
2021	Mandela	Tamil	
2021	November Story	Tamil	
2022	Ori Devuda	Telugu	
2022	Nitham Oru Vaanam	Tamil	
2023	Maaveeran	Tamil	
2025	Mass Jathara	Telugu	
2027	Seyon †	Tamil	

== Awards and nominations ==
List of Vidhu Ayyanna awards and nominations
Year	Category	Nominated work	Result	Ref.
2021	Best Cinematographer	Oh My Kadavule	Nominated	
2023	Best Cinematographer	Nitham Oru Vaanam	Nominated	
