= Gurkha (film) =

2019 Indian action comedy film by Sam Anton

- Theatrical release poster
- Directed by: Sam Anton
- Written by: Sam Anton
- Produced by: Kishore Thallur
- Starring: Yogi Babu; Elyssa Erhardt
- Cinematography: Krishnan Vasant
- Edited by: Ruben
- Music by: Raj Aryan
- Production company: 4 Monkeys Studios
- Release date: 12 July 2019
- Running time: 143 minutes
- Country: India
- Language: Tamil

Gurkha is a 2019 Indian Tamil-language action comedy film written and directed by Sam Anton. The film stars Yogi Babu, while Elyssa Erhardt, Anandaraj, Charle, Raj Bharath, and Manobala, among others, play key roles. It revolves around a security officer in a shopping mall who must save hostages after the mall is taken over by terrorists.

The film was produced by 4 Monkeys Studio, with cinematography and editing handled by Krishnan Vasant and Ruben respectively. The music is composed by Raj Aryan. Filming took place between December 2018 and February 2019, and the film was released on 12 July 2019.

== Plot ==
Bahadur Babu is an aspiring police officer, but gets rejected as he is branded unfit and is unable to clear the physical fitness tests. He joins a security agency owned by Kavariman. Later he gets posted as a security officer in a shopping mall. A gang of ex-servicemen headed by Thyagu, plans an elaborate antisocial scheme and ultimately stages a takeover of the mall. Based on the scheme, the people who are lured into visiting the cinema under the false pretense of getting free tickets and shopping vouchers, including Bahadur Babu's love interest Margaret, are held as hostages. It is up to Bahadur Babu to save the hostages and become a real hero.

== Cast ==
- Yogi Babu as Bahadur Babu
- Elyssa Erhardt as Margaret
- Raj Bharath as Thyagu and Shakil Akbar
- Charle as Usain Bolt
- Aadukalam Naren as Commissioner Nataraj IPS
- Ravi Mariya as ACP Harris Jayaraj
- Anand Raj as Alex
- Manobala as Kavariman
- Devadarshini as Gayathri
- Livingston as the Chief Minister of Tamil Nadu
- Mayilsamy as Politician
- Namo Narayana as the Swami
- T. M. Karthik as QTV Owner
- Redin Kingsley as Hacker
- Supergood Subramani as Margaret's assistant
- JP Jay
- Japan Kumar
- Vijayammal
- Kadugu Ramamoorthy
- Shakthi Rithvik

== Production ==
The first look poster of the film was unveiled by actor Sivakarthikeyan on 15 September 2018. The film was produced by Kishore Thallur under 4 Monkeys Studios. The filmmakers hired Elyssa Erhardt, a Canadian model who earlier played a small role in Sarkar, as the lead actress after auditioning several non-Indian actresses. The film also prominently features a dog. Filming began in December 2018, and wrapped by early February 2019. The director Sam Anton noted that he was inspired by the American films Die Hard (1988) and Paul Blart: Mall Cop (2009).

== Soundtrack ==
The soundtrack was composed by Raj Aryan.

Track listing
No.	Title	Lyrics	Singer(s)	Length
1.	"Hey Poya"	Sivakarthikeyan	Rita, Anthony Daasan	3:49
2.	"Chowkidar"	Arunraja Kamaraj	Arunraja Kamaraj	2:50
3.	"My Vellakaari"	Vignesh Shivan	G. V. Prakash Kumar	3:39
4.	"Gurkha Theme"	Raj Aryan	Arunraja Kamaraj	2:28
Total length:				12:46

== Critical reception ==
Srivatsan S for The Hindu gave the film negative review, saying, "Most of Gurkha takes place inside a mall, where a group of people, along with Margot, is held hostage by self-proclaimed terrorists. How appropriate, I wondered, for the actual hostages are the ones sitting inside the theatre." Thinkal Menon for The Times of India wrote, "The film belongs to the leave-your-brain-at-home category, and may appeal to those who don't mind logical issues and predictability". Gopinath Rajendran of Cinema Express appreciated Sam Anton's direction and Yogi Babu's performance.

== Controversy ==
The first look poster, which portrays Yogi Babu dressed as a Gurkha, elicited controversies among social media users related to racism and stereotypical portrayal of the Gurkha community. Sam Anton denied he had racist intentions, revealing that he had once been saved by a Gurkha during a house robbery, and added that the film actually glorifies such people.
