= Ruben (film editor) =

Livingston Antony Ruben; Indian film editor

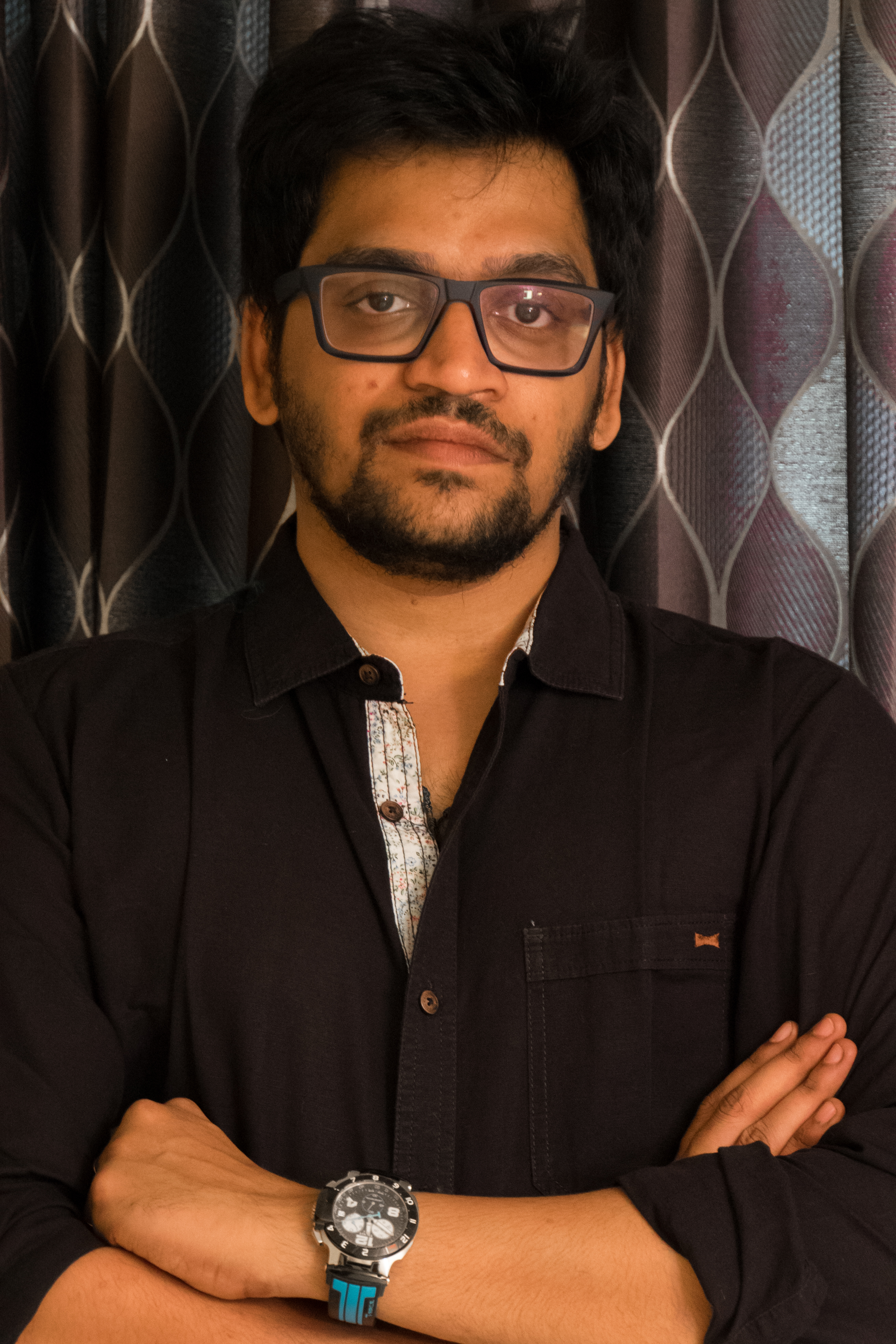
- Born: Livingston Antony Ruben; Kumbakonam, Tamil Nadu, India
- Other name: Antony L. Ruben
- Education: Loyola College, Chennai
- Occupation: Film editor

Livingston Antony Ruben, known mononymously as Ruben, is an Indian film editor known for his work in Indian films, predominantly Tamil films.

== Career ==
After graduating with a degree in Visual Communication from Loyola College, Chennai. Ruben approached director Gautham Vasudev Menon to become an assistant, who redirected him towards noted film editor, Anthony, to join as assistant editor. Ruben subsequently worked on the production of films including Vettaiyaadu Vilaiyaadu (2006) and Vinnaithaandi Varuvaayaa (2010) under the guidance of Anthony. Ruben was then given the opportunity to work as an editor when preparing trailers for films and managed to work on projects including Thoranai (2009), Avan Ivan (2011) and Vedi (2011).

He made his full debut as an editor with Kandaen (2011), before going on to win acclaim for his work in Elred Kumar's Muppozhudhum Un Karpanaigal (2012), particularly for his work in the "Oru Murai" song. Ruben made a career breakthrough with his work in Raja Rani (2013), which went on to become a commercially successful film and won the editor further big budget projects. He won positive reviews for his work on the song "Oday Oday" for the film, and also played a key part in convincing the team to save funds and not shoot the "Angyaade" song, when a shoot was being prepared with locales in Japan. After having been credited as Antony L. Ruben in his earlier films, he adopted the name Ruben for his future ventures, to avoid being confused with editor Anthony.

== Filmography ==
Year	Film	Language	Notes
2011	Kandaen	Tamil	
2012	Muppozhudhum Un Karpanaigal	Tamil	
2012	Edegarike	Kannada	
2013	Samar	Tamil	
2013	Raja Rani	Tamil	
2014	Naan Sigappu Manithan	Tamil	
2014	Jeeva	Tamil	
2015	Darling	Tamil	
2015	Inimey Ippadithan	Tamil	
2015	Trisha Illana Nayanthara	Tamil	
2015	Vedalam	Tamil	
2016	Vil Ambu	Tamil	
2016	Theri	Tamil	
2016	Enakku Innoru Per Irukku	Tamil	
2016	Veera Sivaji	Tamil	
2016	Remo	Tamil	
2016	Jaguar	Telugu	
2016	Jaguar	Kannada	
2017	Anbanavan Asaradhavan Adangadhavan	Tamil	
2017	Vivegam	Tamil	
2017	Mersal	Tamil	
2017	Aramm	Tamil	
2017	Velaikkaran	Tamil	
2017	Balloon	Tamil	
2018	Sketch	Tamil	
2018	Kaathiruppor Pattiyal	Tamil	
2018	Irumbu Thirai	Tamil	
2018	Hyper	Kannada	
2018	Kadaikutty Singam	Tamil	
2018	Silukkuvarupatti Singam	Tamil	
2018	Adanga Maru	Tamil	
2018	Kanaa	Tamil	
2019	Viswasam	Tamil	
2019	Dev	Tamil	
2019	Kanchana 3	Tamil	
2019	K-13	Tamil	
2019	Ayogya	Tamil	
2019	Sindhubaadh	Tamil	
2019	100	Tamil	
2019	Gurkha	Tamil	
2019	Gorilla	Tamil	
2019	Bakrid	Tamil	
2019	Pailwaan	Kannada	
2019	Namma Veetu Pillai	Tamil	
2019	Bigil	Tamil	
2019	Hero	Tamil	
2020	Ponmagal Vandhal	Tamil	
2021	Bhoomi	Tamil	
2021	Sultan	Tamil	
2021	Kasada Tabara	Tamil	Streaming release; "Thappattam" Segment
2021	Udanpirappe	Tamil	
2021	Annaatthe	Tamil	
2021	Pushpa: The Rise	Telugu	
2022	Etharkkum Thunindhavan	Tamil	
2022	Ranga	Tamil	
2022	Nenjuku Needhi	Tamil	
2022	Trigger	Tamil	
2022	Sardar	Tamil	
2022	The Legend	Tamil	
2023	Bagheera	Tamil	
2023	Jawan	Hindi	
2024	Ayalaan	Tamil	
2024	Siren	Tamil	
2024	Buddy	Telugu	
2024	Baby John	Hindi	
2025	Game Changer	Telugu	
2025	Daaku Maharaaj	Telugu	
2025	Agent Ching Attacks	Hindi	Short film
2026	King †	Hindi	
2028	Raaka †	Telugu	
