= Sannidhanam P.O =

2026 Tamil film

- Theatrical release poster
- Directed by: Amutha Sarathy
- Written by: Ajinu Ayyappan
- Dialogues by: Amutha Sarathy
- Produced by: Madhu Rao Mysur; Shabeer Pathan; V Vivekanandan
- Starring: Yogi Babu; Pramod Shetty; Roopesh Shetty; Sithara; Varsha Viswanath; Munnar Ramesh; Gajaraj
- Cinematography: A. Vinod Bharathi
- Edited by: Pon Kathiresh
- Music by: AGR
- Production companies: Sarvata Cine Garage; Shimoga Creations
- Release date: 5 June 2026
- Running time: 130 minutes
- Country: India
- Language: Tamil

Sannidhanam P.O (Note: P.O stands for post office.) is a 2026 Indian Tamil-language drama film directed by Amutha Sarathy. The film stars Yogi Babu, Pramod Shetty, Roopesh Shetty, Sithara, Varsha Viswanath, Munnar Ramesh, and Gajaraj. It explores themes related to Sabarimala pilgrimage. The film was released on 5 June 2026.

== Plot ==
The story follows a mother who takes her young son, Sabari, on his first pilgrimage to Sabarimala. During the crowded pilgrimage, the boy goes missing. Due to a series of unfortunate events and misunderstandings, the mother is wrongly accused in connection with his disappearance and ends up in prison.

Years later, the old case is reopened, and hidden truths about what really happened begin to emerge. The film follows the investigation into the boy's disappearance, the emotional journey of the separated mother and son, and the mystery surrounding whether they will finally reunite. Blending family drama, mystery, and emotion against the backdrop of Sabarimala, the movie explores themes of faith, love, and justice.

== Cast ==
- Yogi Babu as Ayyappan / Sabari
- Sithara as Yashodha & Meenakshi (dual role)
- Roopesh Shetty
- Varsha Viswanath
- Pramod Shetty
- Munnar Ramesh
- Vishalini
- Vinod Sagar
- Gajaraj
- Kalki Raja
- Satvick
- Rajarudrakodi
- TSR Srinivasan
- Aswin Haassan
- Ram Rajendran
- Hari R Menon
- Pithirai Selvam
- Mithran
- Global Subramaniyan

== Production ==
The film was conceptualised by Ajinu Ayyappan, who envisioned a story centred around the traditions and cultural significance of Sabarimala. Roopesh Shetty, Pramod Shetty and Varsha Viswanath made their foray into Tamil cinema through this film. Principal photography began in early 2024, with major sequences shot in locations across Kerala and Tamil Nadu.

== Soundtrack ==
The soundtrack was composed by AGR. A single "Yeri Vanthom Ayyappa" was released in April 2026.

== Reception ==
Abhinav Subramanian of The Times of India rated the film 2/5 stars and wrote, "Sannidhanam PO means well, but never figures out when it has said enough". A critic from Dinamalar gave the film the same rating and felt that in there was no spiritual feeling towards Ayyappa and no affection between the mother and the son. Dinakaran appreciated the cast performances, especially Sithara's, and the cinematography.
