= Pattipulam (film) =

2019 Tamil comedy-drama film by Suresh

- Poster
- Directed by: Suresh
- Written by: Suresh
- Produced by: Thirumurugan
- Starring: Veerasamar; Amitha Rao; Yogi Babu
- Music by: Vallavan
- Production company: chandhraa media vision
- Release date: 22 March 2019
- Running time: 106 minutes
- Country: India
- Language: Tamil

Pattipulam is a 2019 Indian Tamil language comedy-drama film written and directed by Suresh on his directorial debut. The film stars Veerasamar and Amitha Rao in the lead roles while Yogi Babu play supportive roles in the film. The film is scheduled to have its theatrical release on 22 March 2019 along with other small budgeted films and received underwhelming responses.

== Cast ==
- Veerasamar as Udhay aka Mokka
- Amitha Rao as Swetha
- Cheranraj
- Yogi Babu as Shilpa Kumar aka Pei
- Maris Raja as Saaral
- Supergood Subramani

== Production ==
The film was announced by debut director Suresh who previously worked as an assistant director to Sakthi Chidambaram. The film began production in 2014 under the title Mokka Padam. The filmmakers hired art director Veerasamar in the male lead role and Amitha Rao was chosen to play the female lead. Yogi Babu was hired to play the role of a ghost in the film in a pivotal role.

== Release ==
The Times of India gave the film one out of five stars and wrote that "The lack of interesting characters or sequences starts testing viewers’ patience just a few minutes into the film".
