= Sam Anton =

Indian film director and screenwriter

- Born: 30 December 1985 (age 39); Chennai, India
- Occupation: Film director screenwriter Film producer
- Years active: 2015-present

Sam Anton (born 30 December 1985) is an Indian film director and screenwriter who predominantly works in Tamil films.

== Career ==
He debuted with a horror comedy movie titled Darling in 2015 featuring composer G. V. Prakash Kumar marking his acting debut and Nikki Galrani with her Tamil film debut. Darling was a success after which he worked yet again with the composer turned hero for his second film titled Enakku Innoru Per Irukku in 2016. Sam Anton's next project's named 100 starring Atharvaa and Hansika Motwani and Gurkha starring Yogi Babu as lead released in 2019.

== Filmography ==
Year	Title	Credited as			Notes
Year	Title	Director	Writer	Other	Notes
2014	Sarabham	No	No	Actor	
2015	Darling	Yes	Yes	No	
2016	Enakku Innoru Per Irukku	Yes	Yes	No	
2019	100	Yes	Yes	No	
2019	Gurkha	Yes	Yes	Producer	
2022	Trigger	Yes	Yes	No	
2024	Buddy	Yes	Yes	No	Telugu debut
