= Mass Jathara =

2025 Indian film by Bhanu Bogavarapu

- Theatrical release poster
- Directed by: Bhanu Bogavarapu
- Written by: Bhanu Bogavarapu
- Dialogues by: Nandu Savirigana
- Produced by: Naga Vamsi; Sai Sowjanya
- Starring: Ravi Teja; Sreeleela; Naveen Chandra
- Cinematography: Vidhu Ayyanna
- Edited by: Naveen Nooli
- Music by: Bheems Ceciroleo
- Production companies: Sithara Entertainments; Fortune Four Cinemas; Srikara Studios
- Release date: 31 October 2025
- Running time: 160 minutes
- Country: India
- Language: Telugu
- Box office: ₹25 crores

Mass Jathara is a 2025 Indian Telugu-language action comedy film written and directed by Bhanu Bogavarapu in his directorial debut. The film stars Ravi Teja and Sreeleela in the lead roles. It was jointly produced by Sithara Entertainments, Fortune Four Cinemas, and Srikara Studios. The technical team consisted of music composer Bheems Ceciroleo, cinematographer Vidhu Ayyanna, and editor Naveen Nooli.

It was theatrically released on 31 October 2025 and received negative reviews from critics and emerged as a box office failure.

== Plot ==
Laxman Bheri (Ravi Teja) is an honest railway policeman. When injustice happens in front of his eyes, he tries to take it under his control even if it is not within his jurisdiction and do justice. In this process, while working in Warangal, he gives a minister's son a piece of advice in his own style. After that, he is transferred to Adivivaram railway station in Alluri district. Sivudu (Naveen Chandra) rules the tribal area between the hills. He grows Sheelavathi type of ganja with the farmers in the surrounding areas and smuggles it to Kolkata. As soon as Laxman steps into that village, he starts going against Shiva. Starting as a district SP, how an ordinary railway SI can stop Sivudu who has support of the entire political establishment and how he can overthrow his marijuana empire makes the rest of the story.

== Cast ==
- Ravi Teja as Lakshman Bheri
- Sreeleela as Tulasi
- Naveen Chandra as Sivudu
- Rajendra Prasad as Hanuman Bheri, Lakshman's grandfather
- Naresh as Dharmaraju, Tulasi's father
- Taarak Ponnappa as Patro
- Ajay Ghosh as Sivudu's aide Sannasi Naidu
- Hyper Aadi as Sivudu's aide Paidiraju
- VTV Ganesh as Patro's assistant
- Murali Sharma as SI Kandukuri Phanendra
- Navya Swamy as Ganga
- K. N. Murali Mohan
- Hemanth
- Sameer
- Chammak Chandra as Tulasi Das
- Nandagopal MK as Kodanda Ram
- Pandu
- Anand
- Himaja
- Sudharshan
- Kadambari Kiran as Devi Priya
- Praveen as Subramanyam "Subbu", Lakshman’s assistant
- Racha Ravi
- Jabardasth Emmanuel
- Srinivas Raju
- Sammeta Gandhi
- Manik Reddy as Murthy
- Nithin Prasanna as Madhanmohan alias Ranga
- Lakshman Tekumudi as Sivudu’s aide
- Madhusudhan Rao as Narsing Goud
- Sharath Lohithaswa as SP in Warangal District
- Ajay Rathnam as SP Devadas
- Priyanka Jawalkar as Swathi (Cameo Appearance)
- Raj Madiraju
- Killi Kranthi Kumar
- Surabhi Prabhavathi
- Rupa Lakshmi
- Samuthirakani as B. Ajith Narayana
- Nitish Nirmal as Friend
- Sri Kumari as Rukku
- Bharani Shankar as G. Vishnu

== Production ==
=== Development ===
In early-April 2024, Sithara Entertainments announced their next project with Ravi Teja, tentatively titled, RT 75 marking his 75th film in the lead role directed by writer Bhanu Bhogavarapu in his directorial debut, who has earlier penned screenplays for Samajavaragamana (2023) and Geethanjaji Malli Vachindi (2024). The film is jointly produced by Sithara Entertainments in association with Fortune Four Cinemas and Srikara Studios. Sreeleela was announced to reunite with Ravi Teja after Dhamaka (2022) directed by Trinadha Rao Nakkina. South First reported that the film might get titled Kohinoor, with Ravi Teja playing the role of Lakshman Bheri in the film. On 30 October 2024, the film's title, Mass Jathara was announced. The technical team consists of Bheems Ceciroleo as its music composer, Vidhu Ayyanna as its cinematographer, and Nagendra Tangala as its production designer, Nandu Savirigana as its dialogue writer and Naveen Nooli as its editor. The film stars Naveen Chandra as the antagonist and Rajendra Prasad playing the role of Ravi Teja's grandfather.

=== Filming ===
Following a formal puja, the principal photography began on 11 June 2024 in Hyderabad in the presence of the crew and cast. During the filming in mid-August 2024, Ravi Teja got injured in his right hand and had to undergo a surgery, followed by a week's rest.

== Music ==
Mass Jathara

Soundtrack album by Bheems Ceciroleo
- Genre: Feature film soundtrack
- Language: Telugu
- Label: Aditya Music
- Producer: Bheems Ceciroleo

Singles from Mass Jathara
- 1. "Tu Mera Lover" Released: 1 April 2025; 2. "Ole Ole" Released: 5 August 2025; 3. "Hudiyo Hudiyo" Released: 8 October 2025; 4. "Super Duper" Released: 22 October 2025

The background score and soundtrack is composed by Bheems Ceciroleo. The audio rights were acquired by Aditya Music. The first single "Tu Mera Lover" was released on 14 April 2025, with vocals using AI-generated voice of Chakri. The second single "Ole Ole" was released on 5 August 2025. Upon its release, the song faced severe criticism for its offensive language, but the filmmakers clarified that the criticisms were due to misunderstandings only. The third single "Hudiyo Hudiyo" was released on 8 October 2025. The fourth single "Super Duper" was released on 22 October 2025.

Track listing
No.	Title	Lyrics	Singer(s)	Length
1.	"Tu Mera Lover"	Bhaskarabhatla Ravi Kumar	Chakri, Bheems Ceciroleo
2.	"Ole Ole"	Bhaskar Yadav Dasari	Bheems Ceciroleo, Rohini Sorrat
3.	"Hudiyo Hudiyo"	Dev Pawar	Hesham Abdul Wahab, Bheems Ceciroleo
4.	"Super Duper"	Suresh Gangula	Bheems Ceciroleo, Rohini Sorrat, Kasarla Shyam

== Release ==
Mass Jathara was released in theatres on 31 October 2025, clashing with the re-release of Baahubali: The Epic. Earlier it was scheduled to release on 9 May 2025 and then for 27 August 2025, but got delayed due to the industry wide strikes.

=== Home media ===
Netflix acquired the post-theatrical digital streaming rights of Mass Jathara. The film was released for streaming on 28 November 2025 in Telugu, Tamil, Kannada, and Malayalam.

== Reception ==
Mass Jathara received mixed-to-negative reviews from critics.

T Maruthi Acharya of India Today gave 3/5 stars and wrote, "In the end, ‘Mass Jathara’ doesn't change the course of Telugu cinema, nor does it try to. But it does remind you why Ravi Teja still commands loyalty. His timing, self-awareness, and that unmistakable laugh are all intact. The film may not soar, but it stands firm as a full-on theatre experience".

Raisa Nasreen of Times Now gave 2.5/5 stars and wrote "Overall, this film brings back Ravi Teja's mass hero avatar, while he puts a strong show in routine battle between good and evil." Swaroop Kodur of The Indian Express gave 2/5 stars and wrote "Bhanu Bhogavarapu’s film borrows something small from all ‘mass’ cinema swirling in the air today, only to put together an experience that is as unappealing as it is tedious." BH Harsh of Cinema Express gave 1.5/5 stars and wrote "Besides a competent Naveen Chandra, there’s not one redeeming element in this done-to-death ‘mass entertainer' that treats its audience with insulting condescension."

Srivathsan Nadadhur of The Hindu wrote "The stakes are raised, and finally a few sequences reflect flashes of the explosive film that Mass Jathara wants to be. [...] Despite a better second half, Mass Jathara slips into the tired template of action, sentiment, comedy and song. The packaging is lazy and takes the audiences for granted. [...] Mass Jathara is another futile attempt to revitalise Ravi Teja’s career with a throwback to his past glory."
