= Trip (film) =

2021 Indian sci-fi black comedy drama film

- Theatrical release poster
- Directed by: Dennis Manjunath
- Written by: Dennis Manjunath
- Produced by: A Viswanathan; E Praveen Kumar
- Starring: Yogi Babu; Karunakaran; Sunaina; VJ Siddhu
- Cinematography: Udhayashankar G.
- Edited by: Deepak S Dwarakanath
- Music by: Siddhu Kumar
- Production company: Sai Film Studios
- Distributed by: Sakthi Film Factory
- Release date: 5 February 2021
- Running time: 121 minutes
- Country: India
- Language: Tamil

Trip is a 2021 Indian Tamil-language science fiction horror film written and directed by Dennis Manjunath. The film stars Yogi Babu, Karunakaran, and Sunaina in the lead roles. The music was composed by Siddhu Kumar. The film had its theatrical release on 5 February 2021 and received mixed to Underwhelming reviews from audiences & critics and was a box office bomb .

The film is loosely inspired from Hollywood films Tucker & Dale vs. Evil and Wrong Turn.

== Plot ==
A group of friends and family, including Lidi (Sunaina) and Vikram (Praveen Kumar), embark on a journey in a dense forest. They eventually meet two strangers Azhagan (Yogi Babu) and Amuthan (Karunakaran), who are carpenters and painters that came to renew a house in the forest. The group meet the two of them covered with blood (which is actually paint). The group runs away from them because they think that they are serial killers.

After an intense chase, the group of friends camps at a river at night. After some chatting time, Lidi goes to check out the forest. After some distance walking, she finds the two painters and runs away until she trips and falls towards the ground and goes unconscious. The painters come there in time and see the girl, and they carry her and help her by bringing her with them. Eventually, another girl from the group watches the painters carrying Lidi. The girl they also found a dead person misunderstands and thinks that they are abducting Lidi. She runs back to the camp site and tells everyone about the incident. The boys go to look for Lidi but find the painters' jeep leaving with her.

The next morning, Lidi wakes up in the jeep, is shocked when she sees the painter, runs away, and again trips and falls. The painters again help her and tell her their real identity. Lidi is relieved and goes with the painters. The group of friends finds the house where Lidi was staying. The group thought that she had joined the killers. They went to help her but lose two men. One ran away and got eaten by someone, and the other one was hit by an axe. The group gets scared and thought that the painters killed them, but they were wrong.

That night, Vikram and one of the girls went inside the house when the painters were away to help Lidi. The painter on the other side found another girl lying on the ground when they accidentally knocked her down with their jeep. They brought her with them. When they arrive at the house, Vikram confronts Lidi that the painters are killers. The rest of the group came to help the others who are inside the house. After some misunderstandings, the group and the painters started a funny intense fight when they all accidentally broke out a fire. After the fire, another unknown man came with real blood and tied the whole group in the house. continues....

== Cast ==
- Yogi Babu as Azhagan (carpenter)
- Karunakaran as Amuthan (painter)
- Sunaina as Lidi (Paapi)
- Praveen Kumar as Vikram
- Lakshmi Priya as Meera
- Rajendran as Forest Ranger Anjaa Puli (Cameo Appearance)
- Kaloori Vinoth as James
- Nancy Jennifer as Jenny
- Athulya Chandra as Samrin
- VJ Siddhu as David
- VJ Rakesh as Shiva
- Rajesh Shiva as Rizwan
- Mak Mani
- Sathish
- Neethu
- Mooneash

== Soundtrack ==
The film's soundtrack is composed by Siddhu Kumar. All lyrics written by Mohan Rajan.

Trip

Soundtrack album by Siddhu Kumar
- Released: 2021
- Genre: Soundtrack
- Length: 7:39
- Language: Tamil
- Label: Divo
- Producer: Siddhu Kumar

Siddhu Kumar chronology
Sivappu Manjal Pachai (2019)	Trip (2021)	Bachelor (2021)

Track listing
No.	Title	Singer(s)	Length
1.	"What a Life"	Gana Bala	3:56
2.	"Kick O Kick"	JC Joe, Padmaja Sreenivasan, Pooja Venkat	3:43

== Reception ==
Times of India wrote "On the whole, the film, which is competently shot, might seem mildly interesting for those who haven't seen its Hollywood inspirations, but even then, it is a trip that needs to be taken with caution." Sify called it "a below average forest-based thriller". Avinash Ramachandran of Cinema Express wrote, "It is heavily inspired by famous slasher flicks like Tucker and Dale Vs Evil, but director Dennis Manjunath disarms any criticism on this count by beginning the film with the famous Quentin Tarantino quote — “I steal from every movie ever made”"
