= Buddy (2024 film) =

- Theatrical release poster
- Directed by: Sam Anton
- Written by: Sam Anton
- Dialogues by: Sai Hemanth
- Produced by: K. E. Gnanavel Raja; Aadhana Gnanavelraja
- Starring: Allu Sirish; Gayatri Bhardwaj; Prisha Rajesh Singh; Ajmal Ameer
- Cinematography: Krishnan Vasant
- Edited by: Ruben
- Music by: Hiphop Tamizha
- Production company: Studio Green
- Release date: 2 August 2024
- Running time: 135 minutes
- Country: India
- Language: Telugu

Buddy is a 2024 Indian Telugu-language fantasy action film written and directed by Sam Anton (in his Telugu debut) and produced by K. E. Gnanavel Raja and Aadhana Gnanavelraja under the banner of Studio Green. The film stars Allu Sirish, Gayatri Bhardwaj, Prisha Rajesh Singh (in her acting debut), and Ajmal Ameer in prominent roles. The soundtrack and background score were composed by Hiphop Tamizha, while the cinematography and editing were handled by Krishnan Vasant and Ruben. The film is an adaptation of the Tamil film Teddy (2021), which itself was loosely inspired by the Hollywood film Ted (2012).

Buddy was released in theatres on 2 August 2024 to mixed reviews.

== Synopsis ==
Pallavi is an Air Traffic Control officer who suffers a major accident. The doctor along with his crew sends Pallavi into a coma so that he can sell her body parts in Hong Kong. While all this happens, Pallavi's soul enters a teddy bear and reaches the home of a pilot Aditya Ram who shares a past with Pallavi. The rest of the story is as to how the teddy bear and Aditya head to Hong Kong to save the body of Pallavi.

== Cast ==
- Allu Sirish as Aditya Ram
- Gayatri Bhardwaj as Pallavi
- Teddy Gokulan (motion capture) as Buddy
- Prisha Rajesh Singh as Sara
- Ajmal Ameer as Dr. Arjun
- Ali
- Mukesh Rishi as Aditya's uncle
- Sriram Reddy Polasane as Mahendra, Arjun's right hand man
- Ravi Prakash

== Production ==
The film was officially announced on 31 May 2023. The director, Sam Anton revealed that the film would be shot in Telugu, and marking the film as his directorial debut in Telugu cinema. The film was shot in Hyderabad, Goa and Thailand.

== Music ==
The soundtrack was composed by Hiphop Tamizha.

All lyrics are written by Sai Hemanth.

| No. | Title | Singer(s) | Length |
|---|---|---|---|
| 1. | "Aa Pilla Kanule - Buddy's Love" | Hiphop Tamizha, Sanjith Hegde, Airaa Udupi, Vishnupriya Ravi | 3:07 |
| 2. | "Feel Of Buddy - I Just Want To Know" | Hiphop Tamizha, Airaa Udupi | 3:12 |
| Total length: | | | 6:59 |

== Release ==
The film was released theatrically on 2 August 2024.

=== Home media ===
The digital rights of the film were acquired by Netflix, which premiered it on 30 August 2024, along with dubbed versions in Tamil, Malayalam, and Kannada.

== Reception ==
Aditya Devulapally of The New Indian Express rated the film two out of five stars and wrote that "Overall, this buddy action film reminds us yet again that Allu Sirish has an eye for eye-grabbing subjects." Sashidhar Adivi of Times Now gave it two out of five stars and wrote, "The audience have already seen films like Ted (English) and Teddy (Tamil film). Hence, director Sam Anton has to be extremely sure that his film Buddy is completely different and unique. But the film appears to have picked up a monotonous and repetitive template – none of the scenes fail to engage the audiences."
