= Jora Kaiya Thattunga =

2025 Indian film by Vineesh Millennium

- Theatrical release poster
- Directed by: Vineesh Millennium
- Produced by: Zakir Ali
- Starring: Yogi Babu; Hareesh Peradi; Shanthi Rao; Zakir Ali
- Cinematography: Madhu Ambat
- Edited by: V. J. Sabu Joseph
- Music by: Arunagiri S. N.
- Production company: Wama Entertainments
- Release date: 16 May 2025
- Country: India
- Language: Tamil

Jora Kaiya Thattunga (transl. Give a round of applause) is a 2025 Indian Tamil-language drama mystery thriller film directed by Vineesh Millennium and produced by Zakir Ali under the banner of Wama Entertainments. The film features Yogi Babu, Hareesh Peradi, Shanthi Rao, and Zakir Ali in prominent roles. It was theatrically released on 16 May 2025.

== Cast ==
- Yogi Babu
- Hareesh Peradi
- Shanthi Rao
- Zakir Ali

== Production ==
Jora Kaiya Thattunga is produced by Zakir Ali under Wama Entertainment. The music for the film is composed by Arunagiri S. N., while cinematography is handled by Madhu Ambat and editing by Sabu Joseph.

== Release ==
=== Theatrical ===
Jora Kaiya Thattunga released in theatres on 16 May 2025.

=== Home media ===
Jora Kaiya Thattunga was premiered on Amazon Prime Video on 18 June 2025.

== Reception ==
Abhinav Subramanian of The Times of India gave 1.5/5 stars and wrote "Jora Kaiya Thattunga teases something interesting, introducing Yogi Babu as a reclusive, somewhat understated conjurer, hinting at a character piece with a quirky edge.[...] Just another revenge fantasy where you couldn't care less about who gets their comeuppance". A critic of Dina Thanthi reviewed the film by criticizing the lack of connection between the scenes and the films weak screenplay. A critic of Dinamalar rated the film 2/5 stars by criticizing the films screenplay and poor casting.
