= Manithan Deivamagalam =

- Theatrical release poster
- Directed by: Dennis Manjunath
- Written by: Dennis Manjunath
- Produced by: Vijaya Sathish
- Starring: Selvaraghavan; Kushee Ravi
- Cinematography: Ravi Varma K
- Edited by: Deepak S
- Music by: A. K. Prriyan
- Production company: Vyom Entertainments
- Distributed by: Sakthi Film Factory
- Release date: 10 April 2026
- Running time: 125 minutes
- Country: India
- Language: Tamil

Manithan Deivamagalam (transl. A human can become a god) is a 2026 Indian Tamil-language drama film written and directed by Dennis Manjunath. The film, produced by Vijaya Sathish under Vyom Entertainments, stars Selvaraghavan and Kushee Ravi, with R. S. Sathish, Kausalya, Mime Gopi and Y. G. Mahendran in prominent roles. Shot between July and August 2025, it was theatrically released on 10 April 2026.

== Plot ==
Raghavan and his wife Selvi live with their daughter in a remote village without any paved roads. When a relative takes out a loan from Inbharaj, the local MLA's henchman and loan shark, Raghavan and Selvi use the money to open a small roadside restaurant. Their situation seems to improve. But Raghavan makes the mistake of directly requesting improvements for the village from the MLA, which embarrasses Inbharaj.

== Cast ==
- Selvaraghavan as Raghavan
- Kushee Ravi as Selvi
- R. S. Sathish
- Kausalya as Raghavan's relative
- Mime Gopi as Inbharaj
- Y. G. Mahendran as the MLA
- Lirthika MS
- Salem Deepak
- Ela Barath
- Sudha
- Jothikannan

== Production ==
The film was written and directed by Dennis Manjunath and produced by Vijaya Sathish under Vyom Entertainments. Cinematography was handled by Ravi Varma K, while editing was done by Deepak S. Filming began in early July 2025, and wrapped in late August, with the title Manithan Deivamagalam announced a month later.

== Music ==
The music was composed by A. K. Prriyan. The first single "Thangarathinamey" was released on 18 March 2026. The second single "Kalangatha Raasaavey" was released on 30 March. The third single "Yenjaamiye" was released on 4 April.

== Release and reception ==
Manithan Deivamagalam was theatrically released on 10 April 2026 by Sakthi Film Factory. Abhinav Subramanian of The Times of India rated the film 2/5 stars and stated, "Manithan Deivamagalam plays like a film made for an era when broad strokes and manufactured suffering were enough to carry a story, but that era ended decades ago". Kalki Online stated that the acting and cinematography are just superb but was critical of the screenplay.

Maalai Malar wrote that director Dennis Manjunath has emotionally captured the problems of villagers living without basic amenities and the cruelties of usury. Prashanth Vallavan of Cinema Express rated the film 1.5 out of 5 stars, saying it "starts off like an old-school rural drama before quickly devolving into a string of funeral and sexual assault scenes, packed with as many dated Tamil cinema tropes as possible".
