= Thookudurai =

- Theatrical release poster
- Directed by: Dennis Manjunath
- Written by: Dennis Manjunath
- Produced by: Aravind Vellaipandian; Anburasu Ganesan; Vinothkumar Thangaraju
- Starring: Yogi Babu; Ineya; Mahesh Subramaniam
- Cinematography: Ravi Varma K
- Edited by: Deepak
- Music by: K. S. Manoj
- Production company: Open Gate Pictures
- Distributed by: Uthraa Productions
- Release date: 25 January 2024
- Country: India
- Language: Tamil

Thookudurai is a 2024 Tamil-language comedy drama film written and directed by Dennis Manjunath. The film stars Yogi Babu, Ineya and Mahesh in the lead roles. The film was produced by Aravind Vellaipandian, Anburasu Ganesan and co-produced by Vinothkumar Thangaraju under the banner of Open Gate Pictures.

== Cast ==
- Yogi Babu as Manna
- Ineya as Imaiyazlini
- Mahesh Subramaniam as Atharva
- Rajendran as Rangan
- Bala Saravanan as Jeeva
- Sendrayan as Selva
- G. Marimuthu as Mahendra Varman
- Namo Narayana as Kanagarayan
- Ashvin Raja as Gopi

== Production ==
The first look of the film was released on 20 November 2023 and later the teaser was released.

== Soundtrack ==
The soundtrack was composed by K. S. Manoj.

Thookudurai

Soundtrack album by K. S. Manoj
- Released: 2024
- Genre: Feature film soundtrack
- Length: 17:38
- Language: Tamil
- Label: Sony Music South
- Producer: K. S. Manoj

K. S. Manoj chronology
Kuttram Purinthal (2023)	Thookudurai (2024)

Track listing
No.	Title	Lyrics	Singer(s)	Length
1.	"Kannum Kannum"	Eshwar	K. S. Manoj, Ken	3:25
2.	"Unemployed Anthem"	Arivu	K. S. Manoj, Arivu	3:18
3.	"Thaaru Maaru Star"	Mohan Rajan	K. S. Manoj, Yogi Sekar, Seenu	3:46
4.	"Agam Adhirattum"	Mohan Rajan	Velmurugan, K. S. Manoj	3:33
5.	"Naathu Yeiyaadhu"	Eshwar	K. S. Manoj, Seenu	3:36
Total length:				17:38

== Reception ==
Jayabhuvaneshwari B of Cinema Express stated that "How I wish such moments were aplenty films with simple ambitions." Raisa Nasreen of Times Now rated three out of five and stated that "Yogi Babu's film promises a laughter riot."
