= Theri (soundtrack) =

2016 soundtrack album by G. V. Prakash Kumar

- Soundtrack album cover

Soundtrack album by G. V. Prakash Kumar
- Released: 20 March 2016
- Recorded: 2015–2016
- Genre: Feature film soundtrack
- Length: 29:37
- Language: Tamil
- Label: Think Music
- Producer: G. V. Prakash Kumar

G. V. Prakash Kumar chronology
Visaranai (2016)	Theri (2016)	Enakku Innoru Per Irukku (2016)

Theri is the soundtrack album composed by G. V. Prakash Kumar for the 2016 Tamil action film of the same name, written and directed by Atlee Kumar and produced by S. Thanu, starring Vijay. Pulamaipithan, Na. Muthukumar, Pa. Vijay, Kabilan, Rokesh, R. Thiyagarajan and Arunraja Kamaraj wrote the lyrics for the songs. The album was launched on 20 March 2016, and received positive reviews from critics.

== Production ==
This film marks the second collaboration of G. V. Prakash Kumar with both Atlee and Vijay, after Raja Rani and Thalaivaa. In addition, the album also marked Prakash's 50th film as a music composer. In November 2014, During the pre-production phase, Prakash started working on the film's music soon after his inclusion in the project. Both the composer and director went to Russia for a music composing session in the end of November. In March 2015, the duo also went to Goa and continued the music sessions. Prakash further revealed in his micro-blogging page saying that all the tracks in the album are "trend-setting".

In April 2015, Uthara Unnikrishnan, daughter of playback singer P. Unnikrishnan, reportedly sung for one of the tracks in the film. This marked her second collaboration with Prakash, after her debut song "Azhagu" from Saivam (2014), composed by Prakash, which fetched her a National Film Award for Best Female Playback Singer. In June 2015, Prakash recorded an introductory song with veteran composer Deva (later deciphered as "Jithu Jilladi"), with Rokesh writing the lyrics. It was said to be a "thara-local" number and the shooting for the song began during July 2015. It was rumoured that A. R. Rahman would also sing one of the tracks for the film, which did not materialize.

In mid-October 2015, the team reported that a glimpse of the opening track will be released on 17 October. But Prakash Kumar dismissed that the song would be revealed only after announcing the film's title. By late-October, Vijay recorded the song which was titled "Chella Kutti" along with Neeti Mohan. By January 2016, work on all the songs has been completed. G. V. Prakash started working on the re-recording of the background score in mid-February and completed within April 2016.

In February 2016, a song titled "En Jeevan" was recorded with the singers Hariharan and Saindhavi. The song also has Sanskrit verses sung by Vaikom Vijayalakshmi, and written by L. Anandhan, a Sanskrit teacher at Modern Senior Secondary School, Chennai. Prakash sung the alternate version featured in the film. A rap number titled "Dub Theri Step" was recorded within March 2016, which was written and sung by Arunraja Kamaraj. Actor-director T. Rajendar has also recorded one song for the film.

== Release ==
The audio rights of the film, were acquired by Think Music. By early-March 2016, the makers confirmed that the audio would be released on 20 March 2016. G. V. Prakash handed the master copy of the film's music album to the producer, days prior to the launch. The track list of the film released on 17 March 2016. The audio launch event took place Sathyam Cinemas, Chennai with Vijay, director Atlee, composer-turned-actor G. V. Prakash Kumar, producer Thanu and other film's cast and crew attended the event. The event was telecasted on Star Vijay on 3 April 2016.

Besides the album having seven songs, an eight track was added as a supplementary for the film on 31 March 2016. It was completed within eight days and was released on 10 April 2016. The song titled "Hey Aasman" is sung by Yash Golcha, and featured Hindi lyrics written by Vishal Chandrashekhar.

== Track listing ==
No.	Title	Lyrics	Singer(s)	Length
1.	"Jithu Jilladi"	Rokesh	Deva, Balachandran	4:49
2.	"En Jeevan" (Sanskrit lyrics by R. Thiyagarajan)	Na. Muthukumar	Hariharan, Saindhavi, Vaikom Vijayalakshmi	5:21
3.	"Eena Meena Teeka" (Rap lyrics by Arunraja Kamaraj)	Pa. Vijay	G. V. Prakash Kumar, Uthara Unnikrishnan	4:06
4.	"Chella Kutti"	Kabilan	Vijay, Neeti Mohan	4:50
5.	"Thaimai"	Pulamaipithan	Bombay Jayashri	2:46
6.	"Raangu"	Kabilan	T. Rajendar, G. V. Prakash Kumar, Sonu Kakkar	3:53
7.	"Dub Theri Step"	Arunraja Kamaraj	Arunraja Kamaraj	1:59
8.	"Hey Aasman" (Bonus track in Hindi)	Vishal Chandrashekhar	Yash Golcha	1:44
Total length:				29:37

== Background score ==
Theri

Film score by G. V. Prakash Kumar
- Released: 22 June 2017
- Recorded: 2015–2016
- Genre: Feature film score
- Length: 23:57
- Language: Tamil
- Label: Think Music
- Producer: G. V. Prakash Kumar

The original background score was released on 22 June 2017, coinciding with Vijay's birthday. The album featured 23 tracks in total.

No.	Title	Length
1.	"Avna Bayapadala"	0:44
2.	"Baby Hospital"	0:36
3.	"Baby Theme" (Piano Version)	1:08
4.	"Baby Theme" (Voices Version)	0:58
5.	"Baby's Case"	0:59
6.	"Baby School"	0:20
7.	"Bridge Scene"	0:36
8.	"Bus Love" (Pt.1)	0:51
9.	"Bus Love" (Pt.2)	0:44
10.	"Family Meet at Restaurant"	2:40
11.	"First Time Ever"	0:26
12.	"I Love You Solli Irukingla Boss"	0:51
13.	"Intermission"	1:15
14.	"Kalyanam Aidicha"	0:47
15.	"Marriage Proposal"	1:16
16.	"Missing Girl Investigation"	2:08
17.	"Mithra Promise"	0:38
18.	"Rain Chase"	1:24
19.	"Transformation"	0:46
20.	"Unnale" (Love Theme)	1:52
21.	"Vijay Kumar"	0:26
22.	"Vijay Kumar Returns"	0:36
23.	"Villain Shoot"	1:46
Total length:		23:57

== Reception ==
Professional ratings
Review scores
Source	Rating
Behindwoods	3.25/5 stars
Indiaglitz	3.75/5 stars
Sify	4/5 stars
BollywoodLife	3.5/5 stars

Behindwoods gave the album a rating of 3.25 out of 5, stating that "GV Prakash and Atlee combination after a very successful outing in Raja Rani have shown that they are an addition to musically successful director-music director pair with Theri" and gave a verdict "An amalgamation of some mass and class tunes, tailor made for Vijay". Sify gave the album a rating of 4 out of 5, and summarised it as "Commercial cocktail in store for both Vijay & GV's fans!" Indiaglitz gave the album a rating of 3.75 out of 5 further stating it as "a must have in everyone's playlist". BollywoodLife rated with 3.5 out of 5, stars with a statement "GV Prakash delivers an impressive, dynamic album that Vijay fans will really enjoy" and further wrote "Each song is fantastic in its own right. But as an album it is very consistent, which at the same time gives some much needed variation at the right time to keep things interesting." Moviecrow gave 2.75 out of 5 saying "GV Prakash and Atlee try to deliver a fun and entertaining album to satiate Vijay fans, and have just managed to do it". Kaushik LM stated the album "packs diverse varieties of songs starting from melody to kuthu gaana to the jolly peppy stuff" and "adds value to the film".

== Legacy ==
The song "Eena Meena Teeka" was reused in the Sinhala remake of the film Goree (2019).
