= School (2025 film) =

2025 Tamil film

- Theatrical release poster
- Directed by: R. K. Vidyadharan
- Written by: R. K. Vidyadharan
- Produced by: R. K. Vidyadharan
- Starring: Yogi Babu; Bhumika Chawla; K. S. Ravikumar
- Cinematography: Aditya Govindaraj
- Edited by: Raghav
- Music by: Ilaiyaraaja
- Production company: Quantum Film Factory
- Release date: 23 May 2025
- Running time: 147 minutes
- Country: India
- Language: Tamil

School is a 2025 Indian Tamil-language supernatural horror film written, directed and produced by R. K. Vidyadharan under his banner Quantum Film Factory, starring Yogi Babu, Bhumika Chawla, and K. S. Ravikumar in the lead roles. The film has music composed by Ilaiyaraaja, cinematography handled by Aditya Govindaraj and editing done by Raghav. School released in theatres on 23 May 2025.

== Cast ==
- Yogi Babu as Kanagavel
- Bhumika Chawla as Anbarasi
- K. S. Ravikumar as Inspector Kaleeshwaran
- Bagavathi Perumal as Principal Nambirajan
- Nizhalgal Ravi as Mastaan
- Chaams as Assistant Principal Manmadhan
- Priyanka Venkatesh

== Production ==
The film is written, directed and produced by R. K. Vidyadharan, who earlier directed News (2005) and Vaitheeswaran (2008) under his banner Quantum Film Factory. Principal photography began on 25 January 2024, following an inaugural ceremony held in Chennai on 24 January 2024. The technical team includes cinematographer Aditya Govindaraj, editor Raghav, and art director Sridhar.

== Soundtrack ==
The soundtrack is composed and written by Ilaiyaraaja.

Track listing
| No. | Title | Singers | Length |
|---|---|---|---|
| 1. | "Comparison Pannamale" | S. P. Charan, Haricharan | 4:24 |
| 2. | "Sittukoru Kattupadu Othuvaruma" | Shweta Mohan, Srisha Vijaysekar, Priya Malli | 4:34 |
| 3. | "Vedham Sollum Naadham" | Narayanan Ravishankar, Jithin Raj | 3:37 |
| Total length: | | | 12:35 |

== Release and reception ==
School released in theatres on 23 May 2025. Abhinav Subramanian of The Times of India gave 2/5 stars and wrote "School has a decent message buried under strange execution. Sometimes the road to hell really is paved with good intentions." Narayani M of Cinema Express gave 1.5/5 stars and wrote "what remains from all the strewn papers of this clumsy screenplay is how the School manages to deliver simple, meaningful concepts to its audience [...] However, the horror whimpers, the jokes don't land, messages barely make an impact, and the only test this school and its students manage to ace is testing your patience".
