= Madonne Ashwin =

Indian film director and screenwriter

- Born: Nagercoil, Tamil Nadu, India
- Occupation: Film director. Screenwriter
- Years active: 2012-present
- Known for: Mandela; Maaveeran

Madonne Ashwin is an Indian film director and screenwriter who works in the Tamil film industry. He is known for his films Mandela and Maaveeran. He is a recipient of three National Film Awards.

== Career ==
Madonne Ashwin initially made short films for Naalaya Iyakkunar such as Dharmam before working as a dialgoue writer for Kurangu Bommai (2017) under Nithilan Saminathan. He made his feature film debut with the political satire film Mandela (2021). He cites R. K. Laxman as an inspiration for the film as he made political cartoons without hurting anyone's sentiments.

His next film was Maaveeran (2023), which is about a cartoonist that has supernatural powers. Ashwin revealed that the breaking the fourth wall aspect of the film was inspired by Stranger than Fiction and Ober (both 2006). Lokesh Kanagaraj had given him a few inputs for the film.

== Filmography ==
=== As film director ===
Year	Title	Notes	Ref.
2012	Dharmam	Short film; also producer	
2021	Mandela	Directorial debut	
2023	Maaveeran		

=== As writer ===
Year	Title	Writer	Notes	Ref.
2017	Kurangu Bommai	Dialogues	Also actor	
2018	Vella Raja	Yes	TV series	

== Accolades ==
Award Ceremony	Year	Category	Work	Result
National Film Award – Special Mention (non-feature film)	2013	Best Director	Dharmam	Won
68th National Film Awards	2022	Best Debut Film of a Director	Mandela	Won
68th National Film Awards	2022	Best Screenplay (Dialogue)	Mandela	Won
10th South Indian International Movie Awards	2022	Best Debut Director	Mandela	Won
67th Filmfare Awards South	2022	Best Director	Mandela	Nominated
Ananda Vikatan Cinema Awards	2022	Best Debut Director	Mandela	Won
Ananda Vikatan Cinema Awards	2022	Best Story	Mandela	Nominated
Ananda Vikatan Cinema Awards	2022	Best Screenplay	Mandela	Nominated
69th Filmfare Awards South	2024	Best Director	Maaveeran	Nominated
