= Yogi Babu =

Indian actor and comedian (born 1985)

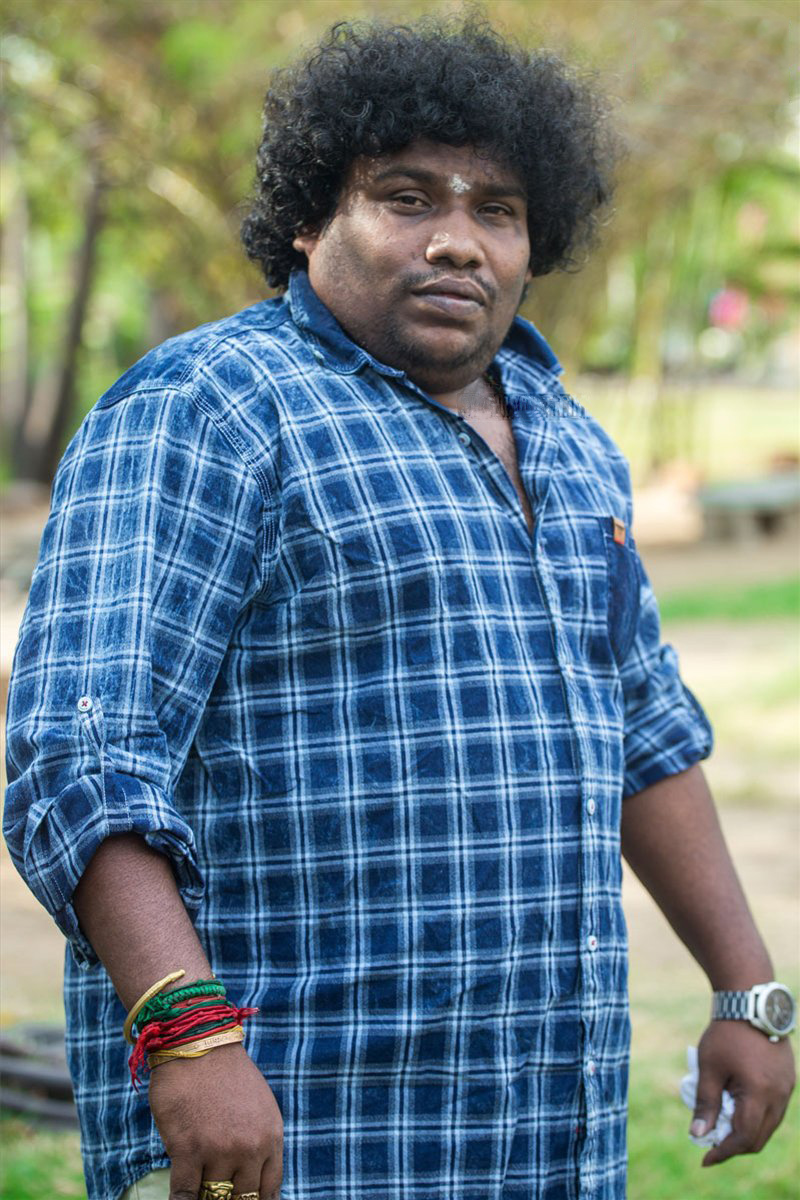
- Babu in 2018
- Born: 22 July 1985 (age 41); Arani, Thiruvannamalai district, Tamil Nadu, India
- Occupations: Actor; comedian
- Years active: 2009–present
- Spouse: Manju Bhargavi (m. 2020)
- Children: 2
- Honours: Kalaimamani (2019)

Yogi Babu (born 22 July 1985) is an Indian actor and comedian who appears in Tamil films.

Yogi started his acting career from 2009 and did many minor roles and got his breakthrough and he is credited as one of the highest paid comedians in Tamil Cinema. He is an recipient of two Tamil Nadu State Film Awards, five Ananda Vikatan Award and five SIIMA Awards.

== Early and personal life ==
Yogi Babu was born on 22 July 1985 in Arani. His father was a havildar in the Indian Army, so Babu travelled extensively as a child, and as a result of which he studied in Jammu in the early 1990s.

Babu married Manju Bhargavi on 5 February 2020 in an intimate ceremony held at their ancestral temple in Tiruttani and the couple have two children.

== Career ==
Babu worked as an assistant director in the Lollu Sabha, and helped writing scenes for two years. He made his feature film debut in the Ameer-starring Yogi (2009) as an aspiring actor and subsequently adapted the name of the film as a prefix for his stage name. He appeared as a goon in Paiyaa. He later appeared as a pimp in Sundar C's Kalakalappu (2012). In 2013, he appeared in his first extended comedy role with Pattathu Yaanai (2013) while he also featured in the Hindi film, Chennai Express alongside Shah Rukh Khan.

He then performed as a comedy rival to Sivakarthikeyan in Maan Karate (2014) and as eerie comedian in Yaamirukka Bayamey (2014). In 2015, he appeared in over a dozen films and won positive reviews for his work in Kaaka Muttai (2015) and Kirumi (2015). Yogi Babu had a breakthrough year in 2016, featuring in 20 films, and winning critical acclaim for his role alongside Vijay Sethupathi in Aandavan Kattalai (2016). This was followed by his role in Kolamavu Kokila (2018) where his one-sided lover portrayal opposite Nayanthara was critically acclaimed while the Kalyana Vayasu song and his antics in it went viral. He appears as supporting character in film Pariyerum Perumal (2018), the film released to positive reviews from critics, with critics praising the comedy and performance of Yogi Babu. He acted for the first time as lead role in Dharmaprabhu (2019) which he play of role of Yamantaka. He played a key role in Gurkha (2019). Babu is a security guard in this hostage drama written and directed by Sam Anton.

Starting his career as a comic relief in many films, he has also played leading roles in small budget films and garnered critical acclaim. In the 2021, political satire Mandela, he played the eponymous character whose single vote would decide the results of the panchayat elections and was very well received. He later played in leading roles as Pei Mama (2021), Panni Kutty (2022), Bommai Nayagi (2023), Yaanai Mugathaan (2023), Lucky Man (2023), Thookudurai (2024), Boat (2024), Kuzhanthaigal Munnetra Kazhagam (2025), Jora Kaiya Thattunga (2025), School (2025), Kenatha Kanom (2026), Sannidhanam P.O (2026) and Singgaramm (2026).

== Filmography ==
=== Tamil films ===
==== 2000s ====
List of Yogi Babu 2000s Tamil film credits
Year	Title	Role(s)	Notes
2009	Sirithal Rasipen	Henchman	Uncredited role
2009	Yogi	Aspiring actor	Credited as Babu

==== 2010s ====
List of Yogi Babu 2010s Tamil film credits
Year	Title	Role(s)	Notes
2010	Paiyaa	Telugu rowdy gang member	Credited as Babu
2010	Thillalangadi	Maasi's sidekick	Uncredited role
2011	Velayudham	Villager	
2011	Thoonga Nagaram	Radha's fan	
2011	Rajapattai	Azhagu	
2012	Kalakalappu	Malaikottai Shankar	
2012	Attakathi	Dinakaran's friend	
2012	Kai	Puyal Perumal's friend	
2013	Pattathu Yaanai	Henchman	
2013	Soodhu Kavvum	Rowdy doctor's henchman	
2013	Thee Kulikkum Pachai Maram	Selvam	
2014	Veeram	Henchman	
2014	Panivizhum Malarvanam	Tarun's friend	
2014	Endrendrum	Film star	
2014	Maan Karate	Vavaal	
2014	Yennamo Yedho	Goon	
2014	Aranmanai	Sagidi	
2014	Jaihind 2	Private school association member	Uncredited role; multilingual film
2014	Yaamirukka Bayamey	Panni Moonji Vaayan	
2015	I	Keerthivasan's fan	
2015	Kaaki Sattai	Beggar	
2015	Iridiyam	Idimurasu	
2015	Ivanuku Thannila Gandam	Man in hospital	
2015	Komban	First man in fight	
2015	India Pakistan	Aamai Kunju	
2015	Demonte Colony	Browsing Boy	
2015	Kaaka Muttai	Naina's friend	
2015	Naalu Policeum Nalla Irundha Oorum	Thief	
2015	Sakalakala Vallavan	Chinnasamy's servant	
2015	Yatchan	Durai's henchman	
2015	Kirumi	Kadhir's friend	
2015	Vedalam	Chatterjee	
2016	Vil Ambu	Honest	
2016	Pokkiri Raja	Mojo	
2016	Mapla Singam	Politician	
2016	Hello Naan Pei Pesuren	Street Singer	
2016	Jithan 2	Annayya	
2016	Tea Kadai Raja	Saravana's friend	
2016	Pandiyoda Galatta Thaangala	Thief	
2016	Enakku Innoru Per Irukku	Ondipuli	
2016	Muthina Kathirikai	Rowdy	
2016	Metro	Subway lover	
2016	Jackson Durai	Mani	
2016	Kuttrame Thandanai	Auto passenger	
2016	Aandavan Kattalai	Muthupandi Selvam	Won, SIIMA Award for Best Comedian; Won, Vikatan Award for Best Comedian-Male
2016	Remo	Remo's lover	
2016	Kadalai	Kaali	
2016	Kannula Kaasa Kattappa	Kettavan	
2016	Virumandikkum Sivanandikkum	Moneylender's assistant	
2016	Atti	Boxer Babu	
2016	Veera Sivaji	Ramesh	
2016	Mo	Pazhani	
2017	Kattappava Kanom	Nandu	
2017	Attu	Sappa	
2017	Nagarvalam	Tamil teacher	
2017	Saravanan Irukka Bayamaen	Babu	
2017	Sathriyan	Samudhram's nephew	
2017	Aaram Vetrumai	Tribal	
2017	Ka Ka Ka: Aabathin Arikuri	Natchatiram	Bilingual film
2017	Pichuva Kaththi	Babu	
2017	Mersal	Nolan	
2017	En Aaloda Seruppa Kaanom	'Remo' Ravi	
2017	Sathya	Ram	
2017	12-12-1950	Singam	
2017	Balloon	Panda	
2018	Gulaebaghavali	Panni	
2018	Thaanaa Serndha Koottam	Narayanan	
2018	Mannar Vagaiyara	Kannan	Guest appearance
2018	Kalakalappu 2	Bhagavan	
2018	Solli Vidava	Yogi	
2018	Veera	Jithesh	
2018	Yenda Thalaiyila Yenna Vekkala	Aadhi	
2018	Kaali	Gopi	
2018	Semma	Omagundam	
2018	Oru Kuppai Kathai	Kumar's friend	
2018	Semma Botha Aagathey	Soosai	
2018	Mohini	Cotton	Won, Tamil Nadu State Film Award for Best Comedian
2018	Junga	Yo Yo	
2018	Kolamavu Kokila	Sekar	Won, SIIMA Award for Best Comedian; Won, Vikatan Award for Best Comedian-Male
2018	Echcharikkai	Frank De Souza	
2018	Avalukkenna Azhagiya Mugam	Arivu's friend	
2018	Seemaraja	Ravana	Uncredited in song "Varum Anna Varathu"
2018	Pariyerum Perumal	Anand	Won, Vikatan Award for Best Comedian-Male
2018	Sarkar	Kaushik	
2018	Kaatrin Mozhi	Mahesh Babu	Cameo
2018	Silukkuvarupatti Singam	Tony	
2019	Maanik	Research and Analysis Wing officer	
2019	Viswasam	Velu	
2019	Kuthoosi	Velu's friend	
2019	Vantha Rajavathaan Varuven	Azhagu	
2019	Thadam	Suruli	
2019	Pattipulam	Udhay's friend	
2019	Airaa	Mani	
2019	Kuppathu Raja	Kaisamaa	
2019	Watchman	Maari	
2019	K-13	Delivery boy	
2019	100	M.Jackson	
2019	Ayogya	Thief	
2019	Mr.Local	Auto Sekar	
2019	Lisaa	Priest	
2019	Dharmaprabhu	Yamantaka	
2019	Gorilla	Pickpocket	
2019	Gurkha	Babu	
2019	Jackpot	Rahul	
2019	Comali	Mani	Won, SIIMA Award for Best Comedian
2019	Zombie	Pistol Raj	
2019	Namma Veettu Pillai	Lawyer	Cameo
2019	Petromax	Paal Pandi	
2019	Puppy	Senior	
2019	Bigil	Donald	
2019	Butler Balu	Ajaykumar's friend	
2019	Action	Jack	
2019	Jada	Messi	
2019	Iruttu	Vanangamudi	Cameo
2019	Dhanusu Raasi Neyargale	Himself	
2019	Chennai 2 Bangkok	Dissatisfied husband	
2019	50/50	Kai Kulandhai	

==== 2020s ====
List of Yogi Babu 2020s Tamil film credits
Year	Title	Role(s)	Notes	Ref
2020	Darbar	Kaushik		
2020	Taana	Dooma		
2020	Dagaalty	Dheena		
2020	Sandimuni	Gorakh		
2020	Naan Sirithal	Dilli Babu		
2020	Asuraguru	'Digital India' Dinakaran		
2020	Cocktail	Don		
2020	Naanga Romba Busy	Kuberan		
2020	Kanni Raasi	Vairamani		
2021	Trip	Azhagan		
2021	Engada Iruthinga Ivvalavu Naala	Aspiring actor		
2021	Sulthan	Otta Lorry		
2021	Mandela	Nelson Mandela		
2021	Karnan	Vadamalaiyaan		
2021	Vanakkam Da Mappillai	Himself	Guest appearance	
2021	Vellai Yaanai	Kozhukattai (KK)		
2021	Dikkiloona	Albert aka Einstein		
2021	Annabelle Sethupathi	Shanmugam		
2021	Pei Mama	Kohli Kumar		
2021	Doctor	Prathap	Won, Tamil Nadu State Film Award for Best Comedian	
2021	Aranmanai 3	Abhishek		
2021	Raajavamsam	Mayakannan		
2021	Murungakkai Chips	Saravanan		
2022	Theal	Tiger		
2022	Veerame Vaagai Soodum	Thalapathy		
2022	Kadaisi Vivasayi	Thadikozhanthai		
2022	Hey Sinamika	Paalmali Baba		
2022	Beast	Jill		
2022	Koogle Kuttappa	Babu		
2022	Centimeter	Centimeter	Partially reshot Tamil version of Jack N' Jill	
2022	Veetla Vishesham	NEET coaching center owner	Cameo	
2022	Yaanai	Jimmy		
2022	Panni Kutty	Thittani		
2022	Kichi Kichi	Boss		
2022	The Legend	Dada		
2022	Naane Varuvean	Guna		
2022	Pistha	Mark		
2022	Repeat Shoe	Maari		
2022	Love Today	Yogi	Won, SIIMA Award for Best Comedian; Won, Vikatan Award for Best Comedian-Male	
2022	Coffee with Kadhal	"Wedding planner" Vignesh "MasterChef" Mahesh "Photographer" Lingesh "Mango player" Mukesh	Quadruple roles	
2022	Dha Dha			
2022	Oh My Ghost	Raja Guru		
2022	Mofussil	Surya's friend		
2023	Varisu	Kicha		
2023	Bommai Nayagi	Velu		
2023	The Great Indian Kitchen	Husband's friend		
2023	Irumban	Blade		
2023	Ghosty	Mental hospital patient		
2023	Yaanai Mugathaan	Ganesan		
2023	Tamilarasan	Rowdy		
2023	Pichaikkaran 2	Maddy		
2023	Karungaapiyam	Pacha Satta Naran		
2023	Kasethan Kadavulada	Babu		
2023	Takkar	Varada Rajan and Don Max		
2023	Maaveeran	Kumar	Won, Vikatan Award for Best Comedian-Male	
2023	Let's Get Married	Mahindra		
2023	Jailer	Vimal	Won, SIIMA Award for Best Comedian	
2023	Partner	Kalyanaraman		
2023	Karumegangal Kalaigindrana	Veeramani		
2023	Lucky Man	Murugan		
2023	Jawan	Health Minister's secretary	Tamil version	
2023	Dhillu Irundha Poradu			
2023	Shot Boot Three	Thala Kumar		
2023	Kuiko	Malaiyappan		
2023	Sarakku			
2024	Ayalaan	Tyson		
2024	Thookudurai	Manna		
2024	Local Sarakku	Saravanan's friend		
2024	Siren	Velankanni		
2024	Yaavarum Vallavare	Cameraman		
2024	Boomer Uncle	Nesam		
2024	Romeo	Vikram		
2024	Rathnam	Moorthy		
2024	Aranmanai 4	Mason		
2024	Haraa	Lawyer		
2024	Teenz	Thanikachalam	Special appearance	
2024	Boat	Kumaran		
2024	Andhagan	Murali		
2024	The Greatest of All Time	Diamond Babu		
2024	Kozhipannai Chelladurai	Periyasamy		
2024	Kanguva	Colt 95		
2024	Jolly O Gymkhana	Father Martin Luther King		
2025	Kadhalikka Neramillai	Gowda		
2025	Kuzhanthaigal Munnetra Kazhagam	Aathimoolam		
2025	Rajabheema	Minister Mandranayagam's son		
2025	Baby and Baby	Guna		
2025	Otha Votu Muthaiya	Egmore		
2025	Aghathiyaa	Himself		
2025	Leg Piece	Kakaruva		
2025	Niram Marum Ulagil	Na. Muthukumar		
2025	Good Bad Ugly	Himself	Cameo	
2025	Sumo	Yogi Babu		
2025	Tourist Family	Prakash		
2025	Gajaana	Bandu		
2025	Jora Kaiya Thattunga			
2025	School	Kanagavel		
2025	Ace	Arivu		
2025	3BHK	Babu		
2025	Thalaivan Thalaivii	Chithirai Kumar "Chithirai"		
2025	Accused			
2025	Saaraa	Babu		
2025	Mahasenha	Suruli		
2026	Kenatha Kanom	Manivasagar		
2026	Love Insurance Kompany	Jolly Prabhu		
2026	Sattendru Maarudhu Vaanilai	Yogi		
2026	Sannidhanam P.O			
2026	Parimala and Co	Uyir Ulag		
2026	Con City	Jacky, Boxer Selvaraj	Dual roles	
2026	Gatta Kusthi 2	Balbir Singh		
2026	Pyaar Prema Kalyanam	Vinoth		
2026	Sardar 2	Agent "Common Man" Django		
2026	Meesaya Murukku 2	Babu		
2026	Jailer 2	Vimal		
2026	Singgaramm	Singgaramm		
2026	Mookuthi Amman 2	Shiva		
TBA	An Ordinary Man †	TBA		
TBA	Non-Violence †	TBA		

=== Other language films ===
List of Yogi Babu other language film credits
Year	Title	Role(s)	Language	Notes	Ref.
2013	Chennai Express	Sri Lankan smuggler	Hindi		
2014	Jaihind 2	Private school association member	Telugu	Uncredited role; multilingual film	
2014	Abhimanyu	Private school association member	Kannada	Uncredited role; multilingual film	
2015	Kaki: Sound of Warning	Chitram	Telugu	Bilingual film	
2024	Guruvayoor Ambalanadayil	Saravanan	Malayalam		
2024	Trap City		English		
2025	Gurram Paapi Reddy	Udraju	Telugu		
2025	Mark	Solomon	Kannada		
2026	Couple Friendly	Shankar	Telugu		
2026	I'm Game	Thief	Malayalam	Cameo appearance	
2027	Harivarasanam †	TBA	Malayalam		
2027	Raaka †	TBA	Telugu	Filming	

=== Television ===
List of Yogi Babu television credits
Year	Title	Role	Notes
2004–2007	Lollu Sabha	Various Roles	
2012–2013	My Name Is Mangamma	Pappu Dhadha	
2021	Navarasa	Velusamy	
2024	Chutney Sambar	Sachin Babu "Sachu" / Vignesh Babu	

== Awards and nominations ==
Year	Award	Category	Film	Result	Ref.
2015	SIIMA Award	SIIMA Award for Best Comedian	Kaaka Muttai	Nominated	
2016	SIIMA Award	SIIMA Award for Best Comedian	Aandavan Kattalai	Won	
2016	Vikatan Award	Vikatan Award for Best Comedian-Male	Aandavan Kattalai	Won	
2017	SIIMA Award	SIIMA Award for Best Comedian	Mersal	Nominated	
2018	Tamil Nadu State Film Awards	Tamil Nadu State Film Award for Best Comedian	Mohini	Won	
2018	SIIMA Award	SIIMA Award for Best Comedian	Kolamavu Kokila	Won	
2018	Vikatan Award	Vikatan Award for Best Comedian-Male	Kolamavu Kokila	Won	
2018	Vikatan Award	Vikatan Award for Best Comedian-Male	Pariyerum Perumal	Won	
2019	SIIMA Award	SIIMA Award for Best Comedian	Comali	Won	
2020	SIIMA Award	SIIMA Award for Best Comedian	Darbar	Nominated	
2021	Tamil Nadu State Film Awards	Tamil Nadu State Film Award for Best Comedian	Doctor	Won	
2021	SIIMA Award	SIIMA Award for Best Comedian	Aranmanai 3	Nominated	
2022	SIIMA Award	SIIMA Award for Best Comedian	Love Today	Won	
2022	Vikatan Award	Vikatan Award for Best Comedian-Male	Love Today	Won	
2023	Vikatan Award	Vikatan Award for Best Comedian-Male	Maaveeran	Won	
2023	SIIMA Award	SIIMA Award for Best Comedian	Jailer	Won	
2024	SIIMA Award	SIIMA Award for Best Comedian	Aranmanai 4	Nominated	
2025	SIIMA Award	SIIMA Award for Best Comedian	Tourist Family	Won	

=== Honours ===
- 2019: Received title of Kalaimamani Award by the Government of Tamil Nadu, which is the highest state honour in the field of Arts.
