= 100 (2019 film) =

2019 Indian Tamil-language action film written and directed by Sam Anton

- Theatrical release poster
- Directed by: Sam Anton
- Written by: Sam Anton
- Produced by: Kaviya Mahesh
- Starring: Atharvaa; Hansika Motwani
- Cinematography: Krishnan Vasant
- Edited by: Ruben
- Music by: Sam C. S.
- Production company: Auraa Cinemas
- Release date: 9 May 2019
- Running time: 175 minutes
- Country: India
- Language: Tamil

100 is a 2019 Indian Tamil-language action thriller film written and directed by Sam Anton and produced by Kaviya Mahesh. The film stars Atharvaa and Hansika Motwani, while Radha Ravi and Yogi Babu play supporting roles. The music was composed by Sam C. S., with editing done by Ruben and cinematography by Krishnan Vasant. The film began production during December 2017 and completed its shoot by August 2018. 100 was released on 9 May 2019.

== Plot ==
Sathya wants to be an upright cop, hoping that his life will become adventurous by chasing criminals and solving mysteries like his childhood best friend, Anwar. However, contrary to his expectations, he gets posted in a control room as an emergency call operator, where he is mentored by 'Pistol' Perumal. His requests to have his department changed fell on deaf ears. Sathya's girlfriend Nisha has a brother, Vicky, who is shown to be in a relationship with Ayesha, Anwar's sister.

Initially, Sathya thinks his job is just as mundane as Nisha's, who works in a call centre. One day, disturbed due to a misunderstanding with Anwar involving Ayesha and Vicky's (Nisha's brother) relationship. Sathya misses a call, which turns out to be from the mother of a boy who was kidnapped. Sathya deduces that the boy is kept hostage in a train, and with Perumal's help manages to nab the kidnappers and reunites the boy with his parents, without letting anyone else know. Perumal believes that the 100th call will change the operator's lives. Sathya doesn't believe until his 100th call turns out to be from Sandhya, who was earlier presumed dead. Using his wits, Sathya manages to save Sandhya from the clutches of the kidnappers and hands over Sandhya and the kidnappers to Anwar to preserve his anonymity. However, Sathya doesn't find any news about Sandhya's return to her house. Disturbed, he reaches out to Anwar, who refuses to acknowledge that Sathya handed over Sandhya to him.

Deducing that Anwar is involved in the kidnapping, Sathya convinces Perumal to help him crack the case, where he brings the rogue, who had confessed earlier that he killed Sandhya, into questioning. The rogue was released within a year of Sandhya's supposed murder since he was a minor. Sathya gets him beaten by Sandhya's boyfriend Haris, and the rogue confesses that he is under the payroll of Das, who runs a drug cartel business in the city. One of Das's men asked the rogue to take the blame for the murder, promising him ₹1.5 crore (US$190,000). Sathya sneaks into Das's hideout, where he finds out that the actual mastermind is Das's associate, David. David runs a sex trafficking syndicate of supplying girls to millionaires for money using Das's business as a front and also fakes the girls' murders to divert the investigation. Sathya arrests David and leaves to rescue Sandhya. David is about to reveal who the mastermind is, but a helmeted assassin kills David.

Sathya asks Perumal to nab the assassin, with the help of the traffic cameras, and the assassin is revealed to be Anwar. Upon questioning, Anwar confesses that he had no knowledge of the trafficking business, but had to shoot David since the mastermind kidnapped Ayesha (Ayesha had eloped with Vicky, fearing that Anwar wouldn't accept their relationship) and was also instructed to kill Sathya, but couldn't bring himself to shoot his best friend. Feeling guilty, Anwar requests Sathya to save Ayesha and commits suicide. Distraught at Anwar's death, Sathya is informed that the mastermind thrashed Vicky and is in the hospital. When he reaches the hospital to meet Vicky, he gets a call from the kidnappers asking him to come to a secluded location to save Ayesha. Upon reaching there, he finds out that the kidnappers have left Sandhya there instead of Ayesha. Perumal traces the kidnappers' phone to the hospital where Vicky is admitted and launches a police team to surround the hospital immediately.

Sandhya reveals that Vicky is the mastermind of the trafficking business, who had joined David and kidnapped 12 girls in total. After creating a ruckus, Vicky escapes from the hospital and calls Sathya to deliver Sandhya to a particular location, in exchange for Ayesha's life. Vicky forces Sathya to stay on the call to prevent him from contacting the police, but Sathya writes the word HELP on his car's windshield, through which Perumal managed to dispatch help to him. Realising that Sandhya is bugged, Sathya asks the team to proceed with Sandhya to the location while Perumal relays Vicky's location to Sathya through another officer's phone. Sathya manages to catch up to Vicky, where he trashes him, along with his henchmen and rescues Ayesha. Sathya asks Perumal to shoot down Vicky to instil fear in the hearts of criminals who commit heinous crimes against women. Perumal, who had never used a pistol before and had only 5 minutes of service remaining, does so, thrilled. Due to his success, Sathya is transferred to the CID, but realises that he can make a bigger difference by being a call operator. Sathya decides to stick to his current job.

In the mid-credits scene, Sathya receives a call and walks away to solve a crime.

== Cast ==
- Atharvaa as Sub-Inspector Sathya Ganesh
- Hansika Motwani as Nisha
- Radha Ravi as Pistol Perumal
- Raj Ayyappa as Vignesh (Vicky), Nisha's brother, the antagonist
- Yogi Babu as Sub-Inspector Jackson, working in the control room
- Saravanan as Ganesh, Sathya's father
- Nirosha as Sathya's mother
- Cheenu Mohan as David
- Mime Gopi as Daas
- Aadukalam Naren as Police Commissioner
- Mahanadi Shankar as Inspector Murugesan
- Mahesh as Anwar, Sathya's friend
- Harija as Ayesha, Anwar's young sister and Vicky's ex-lover
- Pasanga Sivakumar as Anwar's father
- Swaminathan as Gajapathy Swamy alias Gary
- Sampath Ram as Inspector Jegadeesh
- Vijay as Sathya's friend
- Kadhal Kannan as Victim's father
- Vijay Varadharaj as Caller
- Praneshvar as Hari Krishnan
- Pillayar Ruthru as Rajesh

== Production ==
In June 2017, producer S. Michael Rayappan of Global Infotainment announced that he would work together on a project with actor Atharvaa, which would be directed by Sam Anton. However, the failure of Rayappan's Anbanavan Asaradhavan Adangadhavan put him in a financially difficult position, and he subsequently withdrew from the project. In a turn of events, production house Auraa Cinemas took over the project, with Hansika Motwani joining as the lead actress in December 2017.

Portraying a police officer for the first time, Atharvaa underwent stunt training for the role. Tamil YouTube personalities Eruma Saani Harija and Eruma Saani Vijay also worked on the film. The film's shoot was completed in July 2018, with the team announcing that only one further song sequence was left to be shot.

== Soundtrack ==
The soundtrack was composed by Sam C. S. All lyrics are written by Madhan Karky, and the audio rights are secured by Saregama.

Track listing
No.	Title	Lyrics	Singer(s)	Length
1.	"Agulu Bagulu"	Logan	Benny Dayal	4:26
2.	"Ye Di Raasathi"	Kavita Thomas	D.Sathyaprakash	4:38
3.	"Nanba"	Sam C. S.	Sam C. S.	3:02
4.	"100 Theme" (Instrumental)	–	Sam C. S.	2:36
Total length:				11:42

== Critical reception ==
Thinkal Menon of The Times of India rated 2 out of 5 stars stating "100 is an ambitious cop film with a not-so-bad story and almost convincing protagonist, but is marred by a far-stretched screenplay". Sify rated 2.75 out of 5 stars stating "Director Sam Anton's 100 is a passable cop action entertainer which works mainly because of the engaging second half".

S. Srivatsan of The Hindu stated "Tamil filmmakers are in their ‘woke’ phase right now and what better than sexual harassment cases, which have been making headlines every other day? Filmmakers tend to normalise sexual assault by reducing it to a narrative device, and end up harassing the audience. The latest entrant being 100". Avinash Ramachandran, a critic from Cinema Express rated 2.5 out of 5 stars stating "Despite pacing issues and innumerable subplots, 100 is effectively wrapped up with minimal loose ends, and there's an overall sense of satisfaction at the end of 141 minutes".

Sreedhar Pillai, writing for Firstpost, rated 2.2 out of 5 stars stating "The first half of the film is just a built up for a long-drawn-out climax. If Anton had made the film from an engaging script and treated it as a realistic, investigative thriller without any over the top heroism, it would have worked". S. Subhakeerthana of The Indian Express rated 2 out of 5 stars stating "Sam Anton takes too many cinematic liberties with 100, giving us an unrealistic twist that one can't easily buy".
