= Mandela (2021 film) =

2021 film directed by Madonne Ashwin

- Genre: Political satire Comedy drama
- Written by: Madonne Ashwin
- Directed by: Madonne Ashwin
- Starring: Yogi Babu; Sheela Rajkumar
- Music by: Bharath Sankar
- Country of origin: India
- Original language: Tamil

Production
- Producers: S. Sashikanth; Chakravarthy Ramachandra; Balaji Mohan
- Cinematography: Vidhu Ayyanna
- Editor: Philomin Raj
- Running time: 140 minutes
- Production companies: YNOT Studios; Reliance Entertainment; Open Window Productions; Wishberry Films

Original release
- Network: Star Vijay
- Release: 4 April 2021

Mandela is a 2021 Indian Tamil-language political satire television film written and directed by Madonne Ashwin on his directorial debut and produced by S. Sashikanth and Ramachandra of YNOT Studios while director Balaji Mohan, co-produced the film under his banner Open Window Productions. The film being titled after the late South African President Nelson Mandela, stars Yogi Babu in the titular lead role while Sheela Rajkumar, Kanna Ravi, Sangili Murugan and G. M. Sundar play supporting roles. The music for the film is composed by Bharath Sankar, whereas cinematography and editing were handled by Vidhu Ayyanna and Philomin Raj respectively.

The film is set on the backdrop of a village election between two political parties where a local barber's vote will determine the fate of the election. The film was directly released via Star Vijay on 4 April 2021 and internationally through Netflix, the following day. The film received critical acclaim, with praise for its humor, performances, and messaging. It was shortlisted as one among the 14 Indian films to be nominated for Best Foreign Film at the 94th Academy Awards. At the 68th National Film Awards, it won 2 awards for Best Debut Film of a Director and Best Screenplay (Dialogues), both for Ashwin. The film was remade in Telugu as Martin Luther King (2023).

== Plot ==
A small village named Soorangudi in Tamil Nadu is split into two caste-based factions, Northerners and Southerners. The long-unopposed village president, a follower of caste indiscrimination, has two wives, a Northerner and a Southerner. Both factions are led by their respective son, and have been at odds with each other.

During an opening of a public toilet, a feud breaks out between the Northerners and Southerners, and the neglected president becomes paralysed. Since the village election is months away, and taking into account of the president's health, the MLA suggests he appoint one of his sons, Rathinam or Mathi, as his successor. The MLA needs the president for a work contract of 3 crore. Unable to reach a conclusion, the two brothers decide to contest the election against each other. The election is divided along caste lines and the vote is evenly split based on pre-polling.

Smile is a homeless lower-caste barber living in Soorangudi with his assistant Kirudha. One day he visits a post office for a money deposit. Since he doesn't have any ID, the postmaster helps him apply for one and suggests that he don a new name, Nelson Mandela.

When Mandela's voter ID arrives, both brothers try to win his vote by continuously giving him gifts. However, after many days, Mandela is still undecided and the MLA suggests that they auction off his vote. During the auction, Kirudha discovers that the losing side plans to maim him and tricks the brothers into abandoning the auction. When the brothers realize that they have been deceived, they brutally thrash Mandela and Kirudha, disallowing them from leaving the village.

Both brothers give up hope on gaining Mandela's vote. However, when the MLA reveals the full amount of work contract is worth 30 crore, they both have a renewed enthusiasm to win Mandela's vote and the election. However, this time Mandela demands that their money be used for various development of the village, and that he will vote for the one who contributed most to the development of the village. Both brothers reluctantly yield to his demands but plan to kill him should they lose.

On election day, the postmaster suggests that Mandela escape the village after casting his vote, but Mandela insists that he must carry on his father's legacy of running the barber shop. Thugs sent by the brothers await the election results, ready to kill Mandela at his banyan. The president, postmaster, and many villagers come to Mandela's aid on the pretext of getting a haircut. The ending scene shows a standoff between the two brothers, and Mandela with the villagers, all the while election result is being declared.

== Cast ==
- Yogi Babu as Nelson Mandela (Smile)
- Sheela Rajkumar as Thenmozhi
- Sangili Murugan as Periya Ayya
- Mukesh as Kirudha
- G. M. Sundar as Rathinam
- Kanna Ravi as Mathi
- Shankar Thas as Kaalai
- Douglas Kumaramoorthy as Bala
- Kalki as Isakki
- A. Gunaseelan as Marudhu
- Aaru Bala as Murugesan
- Prasanna Balachandran as Sudalai
- Pandiyammal as Devi
- Senthi Kumari as Valli
- Deepa Shankar as Rathinam's wife
- George Maryan as BDO Officer
- Saranya Ravichandran as Vairamuthu
- Subadhini Subramanian as Isakki's wife
- Semmalar Annam as Murugesan's wife
- Master Lingesh as Murugesan's son
- ARK as MLA
- V. Gopiraam as MLA's PA
- V. Vignesh as Pragatheesh
- Yazar as Mookayi's grandson
- Sai Shankar as Thenmozhi's father
- Allwin Ramaiah as Bus Conductor
- Sonaimuthu as Pichamuthu
- J. S. Manikuzhalan as Pichamuthu's son
- Panjavarnam as Bakkiyam
- Kasthuri as Kaalai's wife
- Balaji Ayya as Siruttu Thatha
- Oru Kodi Muthamma as Muthupatti
- Kumki Meenakshi as Mookayi
- Prakash as MLA's Driver

== Production ==
The film was announced by debutant director Madonne Ashwin in July 2019, and principal photography began the very same day. Yogi Babu was chosen to play the lead role as a barber. Director Balaji Mohan came on board as co-producer of the film which also marked his maiden feature film production venture for his Open Window Productions banner. Madonne who was a participant in the reality show Naalaya Iyakunar came up with the script to Balaji who expressed his interest in setting a production venture, but to have a wide reach, he approached S. Sashikanth to jointly produce the film. Talking about the script, Balaji stated, "It is a social satire, set against a rural backdrop. It talks about quite a few things that are relevant in today’s scenario. Though it will have humour, it will be more sensible and meaningful." Principal photography wrapped in November 2019 with just a single schedule.

== Soundtrack ==
Mandela

Soundtrack album by Bharath Sankar
- Released: 28 March 2021
- Recorded: 2020
- Genre: Feature film soundtrack
- Length: 23:20
- Language: Tamil
- Label: Sony Music
- Producer: Bharath Sankar

Bharath Sankar chronology
Dharala Prabhu (2020)	Mandela (2021)	Ammu (2022)

Singles from Mandela
- 1. "Oru Needhi Onbadhu Saadhi" Released: 19 March 2021

The music is composed by Bharath Sankar of the Oorka band. The soundtrack album featured six tracks with lyrics written by Yugabharathi, Arivu, Mamiliva Randriamihajasoa, Pradeep Kumar and Bharath Sankar. One song "Oru Needhi Onbadhu Saadhi" was released as a single on 19 March 2021, and the remaining tracks were released on 28 March 2021, through Sony Music South label.

Track listing
No.	Title	Lyrics	Singer(s)	Length
1.	"Oru Needhi Onbadhu Saadhi"	Yugabharathi	Anthakudi Ilayaraja	4:42
2.	"Yela Yelo"	Arivu	Arivu	2:50
3.	"Mic Testing"	Arivu	Mano Eswaran, Dhanush	4:24
4.	"Ela Mandela"	Arivu	Anthony Daasan, Musa Mashiane	4:32
5.	"Mandela Tribute"	Bharath Sankar	Bharath Sankar	3:26
6.	"Iaino – To Live"	Mamiliva Randriamihajasoa, Pradeep Kumar	Bharath Sankar, Tsanta Randri, Vololona Randriamihajasoa	3:26

== Release ==
In March 2021, YNOT Studios decided to release the film as a direct television premiere on Star Vijay on 4 April 2021 and the film would be globally streamed via Netflix from 9 April 2021. However, the Netflix release was brought forward to 5 April 2021. The film's theatrical premiere was held at PVR Cinemas, Chennai on 31 March 2021.

== Critical reception ==
Thinkal Menon from The Times of India praised the performances of the cast and technical aspects, and wrote that the film is "outright hilarious from the word go, though it deals with umpteen relevant, sensitive topics". Menon further gave three-and-a-half out of five stars for the film. Ranjani Krishnakumar of Firstpost gave 4 stars (out of 5) for the film, further stating it as "Mandela is a film that will remind us of our priorities. It will encourage us to think about our rights as people and our power when we're together, and will also stand as a thoughtful and optimistic view of democracy, for one and all." Manoj Kumar R of The Indian Express, wrote "This political satire is direct and obvious in its messaging. And that adds to the movie's strengths and makes the narration more effective", and rated the film three out of five. Srivatsan S of The Hindu wrote "‘Mandela’ is a first-rate political satire that shows how deep-seated caste is, by taking an unflinching yet unsentimental look." Haricharan Pudipeddi of Hindustan Times wrote "The film allows Yogi Babu to truly showcase his potential and he plays the titular character with so much sincerity." Navien Darshan of Cinema Express gave 3.5 stars (out of 5) stating it as "A hilarious and yet, hard hitting entertainer backed by strong writing and performances".

== Accolades ==
Award Ceremony	Date of Ceremony	Category	Recipient(s)	Result	Ref.
Edison Awards	12 March 2022	Best Screenplay	Madonne Ashwin	Won	
68th National Film Awards	22 July 2022	Best Debut Film of a Director	Madonne Ashwin	Won	
68th National Film Awards	22 July 2022	Best Screenplay (Dialogue)	Madonne Ashwin	Won	
10th South Indian International Movie Awards	10–11 September 2022	Best Film	YNOT Studios	Nominated	
10th South Indian International Movie Awards	10–11 September 2022	Best Debut Director	Madonne Ashwin	Won	
10th South Indian International Movie Awards	10–11 September 2022	Outstanding Performance of the Year	Yogi Babu	Won	
67th Filmfare Awards South	9 October 2022	Best Film	S. Sashikanth; Chakravarthy Ramachandra; Balaji Mohan	Nominated	
67th Filmfare Awards South	9 October 2022	Best Director	Madonne Ashwin	Nominated	
67th Filmfare Awards South	9 October 2022	Best Supporting Actress	Sheela Rajkumar	Nominated	
67th Filmfare Awards South	9 October 2022	Best Playback Singer – Male	Bharath Sankar	Nominated	
Ananda Vikatan Cinema Awards	December 2022	Best Debut Director	Madonne Ashwin	Won	
Ananda Vikatan Cinema Awards	December 2022	Best Child Artist	Mukesh	Won	
Ananda Vikatan Cinema Awards	December 2022	Best Story	Madonne Ashwin	Nominated	
Ananda Vikatan Cinema Awards	December 2022	Best Screenplay	Madonne Ashwin	Nominated	
Ananda Vikatan Cinema Awards	December 2022	Best Film	YNOT Studios	Nominated	
Ananda Vikatan Cinema Awards	December 2022	Best Actor	Yogi Babu	Nominated	
Ananda Vikatan Cinema Awards	December 2022	Best Supporting Actress	Sheela Rajkumar	Nominated	
Ananda Vikatan Cinema Awards	December 2022	Best Playback Singer – Male	Anthakudi Ilaiyaraja	Nominated	

== Controversy ==
People from Maruthuvar community and the barber's profession condemned the film for poor portrayal of their profession and community. SK Raja, the president of Tamil Nadu Barbers Welfare Association, accused the filmmakers of denigrating their community and profession, propagating prejudice and social injustice. A petition was filed by R. Munusamy, the president of the Tamil Nadu Hair Dressers Union, on 21 April, alleging that the film contains several objectionable scenes that speak ill of the barber community.
