= Naan Sivanagiren =

Indian Tamil-language romantic comedy film

- Film poster
- Directed by: V. K. Gnanasekar
- Written by: V. K. Gnanasekar
- Produced by: C. K.
- Starring: Udhay Karthik; Varsha; Adithya Menon; Prem Kumar
- Cinematography: K. Gokul
- Music by: K. S. Manoj
- Production company: M N Creations
- Release date: 11 November 2011
- Country: India
- Language: Tamil

Naan Sivanagiren (transl. I am becoming Shiva) is a 2011 Indian Tamil-language psychological thriller film written and directed by V. K. Gnanasekar in his directorial debut. Produced by M N Creations, the film features Udhay Karthik and Varsha in the lead roles, alongside Adithya Menon and Prem Kumar. The music was composed by K. S. Manoj with cinematography by K. Gokul. The film was released on 11 November 2011.

== Cast ==
- Udhay Karthik as Prabhakaran
- Varsha as Anitha
- Adithya Menon as Police Karthikeyan
- Prem Kumar as Viswa
- Kadhal Sukumar as Prabha's friend
- Ram Rajendran as Anitha's friend
- Cool Suresh as Local Goon in Bus

== Production ==
Naan Sivanagiren was the first Tamil venture for the producers, director, and lead actors.

== Soundtrack ==
The soundtrack has four songs composed by K. S. Manoj. The audio rights were acquired by Venus Music. The audio was released by director M. Rajesh and was received by Rama Narayanan at a special event held in May 2011. At the same event, the film's trailer was released by director Suseenthiran, and was received by director Sasi, in the presence of chief guests, director S. P. Muthuraman, producer T. G. Thyagarajan and choreographer Kala.

Track listing
No.	Title	Lyrics	Singer(s)	Length
1.	"Vaanum Mannum"	V. K. Gnanasekar	Prasanna, Manoj	4:16
2.	"Nee Pogum"	Na. Muthukumar	Haricharan	5:32
3.	"Kadhalillai"	Na. Muthukumar	Benny Dayal, Cisily	4:43
4.	"Cinemathan Engalukku"	Nishanth	Ranjith, Rakesh, Vicky	4:00
Total length:				18:33

== Release and reception ==
The film had a theatrical release across Tamil Nadu on 11 November 2011. A reviewer from Dinamalar praised Udhay Karthik's performance, the cinematography and music but felt the film still had many weaknesses. Baranidharan Sivasankaran from Desimartini wrote "for a movie which was supposed to be an edge of the seat psycho-thriller, there should have been an element of suspense spiced up with a racy screenplay. The suspicion element was broken even before the story started to unfold while the screen play limped every now and then halting the proceedings."

Udhay Karthik later appeared in only a few more films including Paradesi (2013), and the unreleased Ivaluga Imsai Thaanga Mudiyalai, which was shot in 2017.
