= Cooku with Comali season 6 =

Cooku With Comali
- Season 6
- Hosted by: Rakshan
- Judges: Chef Damu; Madhampatty Rangaraj; Koushik Shankar
- No. of contestants: 10
- Winner: Raju Jeyamohan
- Runner-up: Shabana Shajahan Aryan

Release
- Original network: Star Vijay
- Original release: 4 May – 28 September 2025

Season chronology
- ← Previous; Season 5 Next → Season 7

Cooku with Comali 6 is the sixth season of the Tamil-language reality cooking TV show Cooku with Comali. Rakshan returned as the host. Chef Damu and Madhampatty Rangaraj returned to the judging panel, along with a third Judge Koushik Shankar. It premiered on Star Vijay on 4 May 2025.

The finale episode aired on 28 September 2025. The season was won by actor Raju Jeyamohan, and the runner-up was actress Shabana Shajahan Aryan.

== Comalis ==
No.	Name	Entry Week	Exit Week	Status	Ref
01	Pugazh	1		Main Comali	
02	Sarath	1		Main Comali	
03	Ramar	1		Main Comali	
04	Sunita Gogoi	1		Main Comali	
05	Soundariya Nanjundan	1		Main Comali	
06	Sarjin Kumar	1		Main Comali	
07	Dolly	1		Main Comali	
08	Thangadurai	1		Main Comali	
09	Mohammed Kuraishi	1		Main Comali	
10	Poovaiyar	1	-	Guest Comali	
11	KPY Yogi	4	-	Guest Comali	
12	KPY Vicky Shiva	4	-	Guest Comali	

== Contestants (cooks) ==
S.No.	Name	Entry episode	Episode exited	Advantage round	Chef of the week	Golden Apron	Status
1	Raju Jeyamohan	Episode 1	Episode 43	5	3	1	Winner
2	Shabana Shajahan Aryan	Episode 1	Episode 43	5	4	4	1st Runner-Up
3	Umair Lateef	Episode 1	Episode 36	7	1	1	Eliminated
3	Umair Lateef	Episode 41	Episode 43	7	1	1	2nd Runner-Up
4	Lakshmy Ramakrishnan	Episode 1	Episode 43	5	3	1	3rd Runner-Up
5	Priya Raman	Episode 1	Episode 40	4	3	6	Eliminated
6	Nanda Kumar	Episode 1	Episode 40	5	3	3	Eliminated
7	Jangiri Madhumitha	Episode 1	Episode 29	2	1	1	Eliminated
8	Sundari	Episode 1	Episode 21	2	1	-	Eliminated
9	Ganja Karuppu	Episode 1	Episode 13	-	-	-	Eliminated
10	Soundarya Chillukuri	Episode 1	Episode 7	2	-	None	Eliminated

== Chef of the week ==
Week	Airing	Cooks	Comalis	Ref
2	10 May 2025	Priya Raman	Sarjin Kumar	
2	11 May 2025	Priya Raman	Sarjin Kumar	
3	17 May 2025	Priya Raman	Poovaiyar	
3	18 May 2025	Priya Raman	Poovaiyar	
4	24 May 2025	Raju Jeyamohan	Thangadurai	
4	25 May 2025	Raju Jeyamohan	Thangadurai	
5	31 May 2025	Nandha kumar	KPY Yogi	
5	01 Jun 2025	Nandha kumar	KPY Yogi	
6	07 Jun 2025	Lakshmi Ramakrishnan	Soundariya Nanjundan	
6	08 Jun 2025	Lakshmi Ramakrishnan	Soundariya Nanjundan	
7	14 Jun 2025	Sundari	Thangadurai	
7	15 Jun 2025	Sundari	Thangadurai	
8	21 Jun 2025	Umair Lateef	Ramar	
8	22 Jun 2025	Umair Lateef	Ramar	
9	28 Jun 2025	Jangiri Madhumitha	Soundariya Nanjundan	
9	29 Jun 2025	Jangiri Madhumitha	Soundariya Nanjundan	
10	05 Jul 2025	Priya Raman	Dolly	
10	06 Jul 2025	Priya Raman	Dolly	
11	12 Jul 2025	Nandha kumar	Kuraishi	
11	13 Jul 2025	Nandha kumar	Kuraishi	
12	19 Jul 2025	Shabana Shajahan	Sarath	
12	20 Jul 2025	Shabana Shajahan	Sarath	
13	26 Jul 2025	Lakshmi Ramakrishnan	Kuraishi	
13	27 Jul 2025	Lakshmi Ramakrishnan	Kuraishi	
14	02 Aug 2025	Raju Jeyamohan	Ramar	
14	03 Aug 2025	Raju Jeyamohan	Ramar	
15	09 Aug 2025	Nandha Kumar	Sunita	
15	10 Aug 2025	Nandha Kumar	Sunita	
16	16 Aug 2025	Shabana Shajahan	Kuraishi	
16	17 Aug 2025	Shabana Shajahan	Kuraishi	
17	23 Aug 2025	Shabana Shajahan	Sarjin kumar	
17	24 Aug 2025	Shabana Shajahan	Sarjin kumar	
18	30 Aug 2025	Lakshmi Ramakrishnan	Sunita	
18	31 Aug 2025	Lakshmi Ramakrishnan	Sunita	
19	06 Sep 2025	Shabana Shajahan 1st Finalist	Ramar	
19	07 Sep 2025	Shabana Shajahan 1st Finalist	Ramar	
20	20 Sep 2025	Raju Jeyamohan 2nd Finalist	Sunita	
20	21 Sep 2025	Lakshmi Ramakrishnan 3rd Finalist	Ramar	
22	20 Sep 2025 (Wildcard round)	Umair Lateef 4th Finalist	Sunita	
22	21 Sep 2025 (Wildcard round)	Umair Lateef 4th Finalist	Sunita	
23	28 Sep 2025	Raju Jeyamohan Winner	Ramar	
23	28 Sep 2025	Shabana Shajahan 1st Runner up	Pugazh	
23	28 Sep 2025	Umair Lateef 2nd Runner up	Sunita	
23	28 Sep 2025	Lakshmi Ramakrishnan 3rd Runner up	Kuraishi	

Ex Contestants

13 Spet 2025 / 14 Sept 2025 : Uma Riyaz - Puzagh

== Golden Apron ==
Week	Airing	Cooks	Comalis
2	10 May 2025	Priya Raman	Sarjin
2	11 May 2025	Priya Raman	Sarjin
3	17 May 2025	Priya Raman	Poovaiyar
3	18 May 2025	Priya Raman	Poovaiyar
4	24 May 2025	Priya Raman	Kuraishi
4	25 May 2025	Priya Raman	Kuraishi
5	31 May 2025	Nandakumar	KPY yogi
5	01 Jun 2025	Nandakumar	KPY yogi
6	07 Jun 2025	Priya Raman	Thangadurai
6	08 Jun 2025	Priya Raman	Thangadurai
7	14 Jun 2025	Priya Raman and Nandakumar	Pugazh and Kuraishi
7	15 Jun 2025	Priya Raman and Nandakumar	Pugazh and Kuraishi
9	28 Jun 2025	Jangiri Madhumita	Soundariya
9	29 Jun 2025	Jangiri Madhumita	Soundariya
10	05 Jul 2025	Umair Lateef	Kuraishi
10	06 Jul 2025	Umair Lateef	Kuraishi
11	12 Jul 2025	Nandakumar	Kuraishi
11	13 Jul 2025	Nandakumar	Kuraishi
13	26 Jul 2025	Lakshmi Ramakrishnan	Kuraishi
13	27 Jul 2025	Lakshmi Ramakrishnan	Kuraishi
14	02 Aug 2025	Priya Raman	Thangadurai
14	03 Aug 2025	Priya Raman	Thangadurai
16	16 Aug 2025	Shabana Shajahan	Kuraishi
16	17 Aug 2025	Shabana Shajahan	Kuraishi
17	23 Aug 2025	Shabana Shajahan	Sarjin
17	24 Aug 2025	Shabana Shajahan	Sarjin
18	30 Aug 2025	Shabana Shajahan	Thangadurai
18	31 Aug 2025	Shabana Shajahan	Thangadurai
19	06 Sep 2025	Shabana Shajahan	Ramar
19	07 Sep 2025	Shabana Shajahan	Ramar
21	20 Sep 2025	Raju Jeyamohan	Sunita
21	20 Sep 2025	Lakshmy Ramakrishnan	Ramar
21	21 Sep 2025	Umair Lateef (Wildcard)	Sunita
22 FINALE	27 Sep 2025	Raju Jeyamohan WINNER	Ramar
22 FINALE	27 Sep 2025	Shabana Shajahan 1st Runner up	Pugazh
22 FINALE	28 Sep 2025	Umair Lateef 2nd Runner up	Sunita
22 FINALE	28 Sep 2025	Lakshmy Ramakrishnan 3rd Runner up	Kuraishi

== Pairing ==
Cooks	Week 1	Week 2	Week 3	Week 4	Week 5	Week 6	Week 7	Week 8	Week 9	Week 10	Week 11	Week 12	Week 13	Week 14	Week 15	Week 16	Week 17	Week 18	Week 19 (Elimination round)	Week 19	Week 20	Week 21	Week 21 (Wildcard round)	Week 22 FINALE
Shabana	Kuraishi	Sunita | 6	Pugazh | 4	Pugazh | 4	Sarjin | 5	Kuraishi | 5	Dolly | 5	Thangadurai & Ariyan	Pugazh | 4	Sunita | 5	Ramar | 3	Sarath	Pugazh | 3	Soundariya | 4	Sarath	Kuraishi | 1	Sarjin | 1	Thangadurai | 1	-	Ramar | 1st Finalist	Vicky shiva	1st Finalist		
Raju	Pugazh	Sarath	Ramar | 7	Thangadurai | 5	Dolly | 3	Sarjin | 4	Soundariya | 2	Soundariya & Prabhu	Ramar	Sarjin	Sarath | 7	Ramar	Soundariya	Ramar | 3	Soundariya	Pugazh | 4	Kuraishi | 3	Pugazh	Pugazh	Kuraishi	Kuraishi	Sunita	2nd Finalist	
Lakshmi	Ramar	Poovaiyar | 2	Soundariya | 2	Yogi | 2	Vicky | 5	Soundariya | 3	Vicky | 4	Sunita & Ashwin Raghavan	Sunita | 4	Soundariya | 5	Thangadurai | 2	Thangadurai	Kuraishi | 1	Sarjin	Pugazh	Thangadurai | 3	Soundariya | 4	Sunita	-	Pugazh	Thangadurai	Ramar	3rd Finalist	
Umair	Sarath	Ramar | 4	Dolly | 5	Sunita | 7	Sarath	Dolly | 6	Sarjin | 4	Ramar & Ameena	Thangadurai | 2	Kuraishi | 1	Sunita | 6	Sunita	Sarath | 5	Pugazh | 5	Sarjin	Soundariya | 5	Ramar | 2	Kuraishi	Kuraishi	Eliminated (Episode 36)			Sunita 4th Finalist	
Priya	Dolly	Sarjin | 1	Poovaiyar | 1	Kuraishi | 1	Poovaiyar | 4	Thangadurai | 1	Pugazh | 1	Pugazh & Kiran/Ranjith	Kuraishi | 6	Dolly | 2	Pugazh | 5	Pugazh	Ramar | 2	Thangadurai | 1	Ramar	Sarjin | 6	Sunitha | 6	Soundariya	Ramar	Sunita	Soundariya	Pugazh Eliminated (Episode 40)	Kuraishi	
Nandakumar	Sarjin	Soundariya | 7	Sunita	Dolly	Yogi | 1	Ramar | 2	Kuraishi | 1	Dolly & Kamali	Sarjin | 3	Pugazh | 4	Kuraishi | 1	Vicky Shiva	Sunita	Sunitha	Sunitha	Sunitha | 2	Dolly | 5	Sarjin	-	Soundariya	Sarjin	Kuraishi Eliminated (Episode 40)	Ramar	
Madhumitha	Sunita	Kuraishi | 5	Sarath | 3	Vicky | 3	Pugazh | 2	Sarath | 4	Sunita | 3	Sarjin & Bharath	Soundariya | 1	Ramar | 3	Sarjin | 3	Kuraishi	Sarjin | 4	Kuraishi	Kuraishi	Eliminated (Episode 29)							Sarjin	
Sundari	Thangadurai	Pugazh | 3	Thangadurai | 6	Poovaiyar | 6	Ramar | 7	Sunita	Thangadurai | 6	Kuraishi & Kathiresan	Sarath	Thangadurai	Soundariya	Eliminated (Episode 22)											Soundariya	
Karuppu	Soundariya	Dolly	Kuraishi	Sarath	Sunita	Pugazh	Ramar	Eliminated (Episode 13)															Dolly	
Soundarya	Poovaiyar	Thangadurai	Sarjin	Sarjin	Eliminated (Episode 7)																		Thangadurai	

Chef of the Week
Golden Apron
Advantage Task Winner
Danger Zone
Elimination Round
Eliminated

=== Casting ===
The previous year's contestants Pugazh, KPY Sarath, Sunita Gogoi and Ramar returned to compete in the show; they were joined by newcomers Bigg Boss 8 fame Soundariya Nanjundan |-
