= Gypsy (2020 film) =

2020 Indian Tamil-language road movie directed by Raju Murugan

- Theatrical release poster
- Directed by: Raju Murugan
- Written by: Raju Murugan
- Produced by: Ambeth Kumar
- Starring: Jiiva; Natasha Singh; Lal Jose; Sunny Wayne
- Cinematography: Selvakumar S. K.
- Edited by: Raymond Derrick Crasta
- Music by: Santhosh Narayanan
- Production company: Olympia Movies
- Release date: 6 March 2020
- Running time: 161 minutes
- Country: India
- Language: Tamil

Gypsy is a 2020 Indian Tamil-language romantic road film written and directed by Raju Murugan. The film stars Jiiva, Natasha Singh, Lal Jose, and Sunny Wayne. This film marked the Tamil debut of actress Natasha Singh, director Lal Jose and actor Sunny Wayne. The film was produced by Ambeth Kumar under the banner of Olympia Movies. The film's soundtrack was composed by Santhosh Narayanan and cinematography and editing were handled by Selvakumar S. K. and Raymond Derrick Crasta, respectively.

After running into censorship troubles, the film which was initially scheduled to release on 24 January 2020, was released on 6 March 2020. The film had its theatrical release on 6 March 2020 after several delays and received mixed reviews from the critics mainly criticising the writing and screenplay. Critics revealed that the storyline and release of the film was a nick of time which resembled the 2020 Delhi riots.

== Plot ==
Born in Kashmir to a Hindu father and a Muslim mother, young Gypsy loses his parents during a conflict and is taken in by a traditional leader known as "Senior." Raised across the country by his adoptive father, Gypsy becomes a man deeply rooted in the land; he is multilingual and lives without practicing any religion. Gypsy is a rebellious figure a message the film seeks to convey repeatedly.

== Cast ==
- Jiiva as Gypsy
  - John Jude Kennedy as Young Gypsy
- Natasha Singh as Waheeda
- Lal Jose as Muthaleef
- Sunny Wayne as Sakhavu Balan, a communist leader
- Yasmin Khan as Waheeda's mother
- Fajilama as Waheeda's younger sister
- Fahran as Waheeda' younger brother
- Susheela Raman as a Varanasi resident
- Karuna Prasad
- Piyush Manush
- Bant Singh

== Production ==
The film titled was announced by director Raju Murugan as his third assignment in June 2018 who is also known for his previous directorial works such as Joker and Cuckoo. The shooting for the film commenced in around early June 2018 at Karaikkal. The first look poster of the film was unveiled on 11 June 2018. Jiiva accepted to work for the film with the director while he was busy with the shooting of his next film Gorilla.

The film was initially speculated to be a social drama film but later the film-makers revealed that the film was made up as a romantic travel based story. Malayalam actor Sunny Wayne was roped in to play an important role as communist leader in the film and coincidentally he made his début in Kollywood industry through this film.

For his role in the film, Jiiva grew his hair, learned to play the guitar, and practiced horseriding. The shooting of the film was wrapped up on 6 November 2018.

== Soundtrack ==
Gypsy

Soundtrack album by Santhosh Narayanan and Susheela Raman
- Released: 3 April 2019 (Album); 19 May 2019 (Bonus singles)
- Recorded: 2018–2019
- Genre: Feature film soundtrack
- Length: 34:15
- Language: Tamil
- Label: Saregama
- Producer: Santhosh Narayanan

Santhosh Narayanan chronology
Otha Seruppu Size 7 (2019)	Gypsy (2019)	Penguin (2020)

Susheela Raman chronology
Ghost Gamelan (2018)	Gypsy (2019)

Singles from Gypsy
- 1. "Very Very Bad" Released: 22 January 2019; 2. "Desaandhiri" Released: 26 February 2019; 3. "Manamengum Maaya Oonjal" Released: 3 April 2019; 4. "Aasai Mugam (Bonus Single)" Released: 19 May 2019; 5. "Ullam Uruguthayaa (Bonus Single)" Released: 19 May 2019

Raju Murugan, decided to recruit Santhosh Narayanan, to compose the soundtrack and score for the film, after the latter's debut film Cuckoo in which the former was impressed by Santhosh's composition of songs and score in the film. The song recording process, was completed within the end of 2018. All the lyrics for the songs were written by Yugabharathi, except one song was written and performed by Arivu. The album features six tracks. In an interview with The Hindu, Santhosh Narayanan said that Jiiva's guitar in the film is special. As a story of a travelling musician, Gypsy is a particularly appealing film for a music director. “It’s a very fun project as a composer to work on a movie that has music in its core.” They also custom-made a guitar from Kashmir for Jiiva to use in the film.

The song teaser of the film was unveiled on 31 December 2018. The first single "Very Very Bad" which featured in the film was released on 22 January 2019 with the auspices of Indian Communist Party members and social activists such as R. Nallakannu, Thirumurugan Gandhi, Piyush Manush, Balbharati and Grace Banu. This marks the first ever instance in Tamil cinema that social activists were invited to launch a Tamil film's song promo. The second single track "Desaandhiri" which was sung by Santhosh Narayanan, with backing vocals by actor Siddharth was launched on 26 February 2019. Carnatic musician T. M. Krishna had recorded the song "Venpura" for the film.

The complete soundtrack album in its entirety was released on 3 April 2019, at Sathyam Cinemas, Chennai. Featuring director Karu Palaniappan, composers D. Imman, Sean Roldan, producer S. R. Prabhu and other celebrities along with the film's cast and crew in attendance, the event also featured Bant Singh, an activist singer. A book on Bant Singh, who has done a role in the film, was launched at the event as a gesture of his personal rebellion against discrimination. The film's trailer was launched at the event. British-Indian musician Susheela Raman who also played a supporting role in the film, performed two songs which were released as bonus singles, after the soundtrack release on 19 May 2019.

All lyrics are written by Yugabharathi, except where noted.

No.	Title	Music	Singer(s)	Length
1.	"Very Very Bad"	Santhosh Narayanan	Santhosh Narayanan, Pradeep Kumar	3:34
2.	"Kaaththellam"	Santhosh Narayanan	Pradeep Kumar	3:43
3.	"Desaandhiri"	Santhosh Narayanan	Siddharth, Santhosh Narayanan	3:43
4.	"Manamengum Maaya Oonjaal"	Santhosh Narayanan	Dhee, Ananthu, Haricharan	4:14
5.	"Theevira Vyaadhi" (Lyrics written by Arivu)	Santhosh Narayanan	Arivu	3:13
6.	"Venpura"	Santhosh Narayanan	T. M. Krishna, Santhosh Narayanan	6:00
7.	"Aasai Mugam" (Lyrics written by Subramaniya Bharathi)	Susheela Raman, Sam Mills	Susheela Raman	5:03
8.	"Ullam Uruguthayaa" (Lyrics written by Andavan Pichai)	Susheela Raman, Sam Mills	Susheela Raman	4:44
Total length:				34:15

== Censorship issues ==
The film faced issues on censoring, despite wrapping the shoot months ago. The Central Board of Film Certification (CBFC), disapproved to censor the film as there are some scenes in the film that resemble the issues that happened in the Yogi Adityanath government in Uttar Pradesh, and there are also reports that some dialogues have been asked to be muted and names of characters which resemble real-life prominent figures have been asked to be changed, in the hope of avoiding a controversy later on. The censor issues were cleared after the makers appealed the Film Certification Appeal Tribunal (FCAT), regarding the issue, where the film received an "A" certificate with minor cuts. Actor Jiiva revealed that 25 cuts of the film are available in YouTube.

== Release ==
The film was initially scheduled to release on 24 January 2020, but director Murugan announced that the film would release on 6 March 2020.
