= Azhagam Perumal =

Indian filmmaker

- Born: N. Azhagam Perumal; 25 May 1965 (age 61); Kulasekarapuram, Kanyakumari District, Tamil Nadu, India
- Occupations: Actor; director
- Years active: 1991-present

Azhagam Perumal is an Indian film director and actor, who works in Tamil film industry.

== Career ==
Azhagam Perumal hails from the village of Kulasekharapuram in Kanyakumari District, Tamil Nadu. All his family members were working in the government service and his parents wanted him to be an engineer. Azhagam Perumal, however, after his graduation, applied to the Adyar Film Institute in spite of stiff opposition from his family. He graduated with a Gold Medal from the Institute in 1991.

Azhagam Perumal worked as an assistant to director Mani Ratnam from Thalapathi to Iruvar, before leaving to make his independent project. When Mani Ratnam was shooting Alai Payuthey, he was looking for someone like Jagathy Sreekumar to play the quirky house owner, which Azhagam Perumal eventually did, making his acting debut.

He had initially announced his directorial debut in 1998 as Mudhal Mudhalaaga, a romantic film starring Arvind Swamy and Karisma Kapoor. Despite beginning production, the film was indefinitely put on hold. He then started making Udhaya in 1999 with Vijay and Simran starring, but the film faced production delays owing to the producer's financial problems. Azhagam Perumal also discussed making a film titled Hijack in 2000 but the film failed to develop. He later attempted to make the film with Vikram in 2004, but the project did not proceed.

His directorial debut was eventually the romantic comedy Dumm Dumm Dumm starring R. Madhavan and Jyothika, in which his mentor Mani Ratnam worked as the screenwriter and producer. The film released in 2001 and was a success. After Alai Payuthey, he was offered acting offers but he declined as he wanted to revive and complete Udhaya by early 2004.

He mostly known for his performances in Pudhupettai (2006), 7 Aum Arivu (2011) and Naanum Rowdydhaan (2016). He is also in supporting roles in Jayam Ravi movies in Adanga Maru (2019), Iraivan (2023) and Siren (2024).

== Filmography ==
- All films and series are in Tamil unless otherwise noted.

=== Directorial and writing ===
Year	Film	Credited as		Notes
Year	Film	Director	Writer	Notes
2001	Dumm Dumm Dumm	Yes	Yes	
2003	Joot	Yes	Screenplay	
2004	Udhaya	Yes	Story, screenplay	
2007	Guru	No	Dialogues	Tamil dubbed version

=== Acting ===
==== Tamil films ====
Year	Title	Role	Notes
1991	Pudhu Nellu Pudhu Naathu	Suganya's cousin	
2000	Alai Payuthey	House owner	
2006	Pudhupettai	Thamizhselvan	
2007	Kattradhu Thamizh	Poobaal Raavar	
2008	Alibhabha	Thiagarajan	
2009	Kanden Kadhalai	Perumal	
2010	Aayirathil Oruvan	Ravi	
2010	Kacheri Arambam	Vasu	
2010	Rettaisuzhi		
2010	Raavanan	Photographer	
2010	Thottu Paar		
2010	Nil Gavani Sellathey		
2011	Vanthaan Vendraan	Arjun and Ramana's father	
2011	7 Aum Arivu	Museum curator	Uncredited role
2011	Vellore Maavattam	Gurumoorthy	
2011	Osthe	Shankaralingam	
2012	Oru Kal Oru Kannadi	Varadharajan	
2012	Neerparavai	Church father	
2012	Ammavin Kaipesi	Chinnapillai	
2013	Samar	Sakthi's father	
2014	Yennamo Yedho	Narayanan	
2014	Ennamo Nadakkudhu		
2014	Vetri Selvan	Babu	
2014	Nalanum Nandhiniyum	Arunachalam	
2014	Isai	Gunasekhar	
2015	Valiyavan	Raghuraman	
2015	Idam Porul Yaeval		
2015	Yatchan	Kreshna's father	
2015	Naanum Rowdy Dhaan	Ravikumar	
2015	Eetti	Gayathri's father	
2016	Maalai Nerathu Mayakkam	Prabhu's father	
2016	Theri	Rathinam	
2017	Taramani	Barnabas	
2017	Solo	Thomas Zachariah	
2018	Vanjagar Ulagam	Mahalingam	
2018	Ezhumin	Sundaram	
2018	Adanga Maru	Chandran	
2019	Chithiram Pesuthadi 2		
2019	Natpuna Ennanu Theriyuma	Shruti's father	
2019	Dharmaprabhu	Politician	
2019	Hero	Sakthi's father	
2021	Master	Principal	
2021	Kamali From Nadukkaveri	Shanmugam	
2021	Karnan	Neighborhood Village Head	
2021	Vanam		
2022	Ayngaran	Police officer	
2022	Trigger	Police commissioner	
2022	Anel Meley Pani Thuli	SI	
2022	Witness		
2022	Nitham Oru Vaanam	Seniyappan	
2023	Maamannan	Sundaram	
2023	Iraivan	Mani	
2024	Siren	Manickathangam	
2024	Kadaisi Ulaga Por	Pulipandi	
2024	Emakku Thozhil Romance	Umashankar's father	
2025	Kingston	Stephen Bose	
2025	Kuberaa	Mukund	Bilingual film
2025	Thanal	Ranganathan	
2025	Bison Kaalamaadan	Kandippan	

==== Other language films ====
Year	Film	Role	Language	Notes
2014	1 by Two	Narayanan Pillai	Malayalam	
2022	Ante Sundaraniki!	Leela Thomas' father	Telugu	
2025	Kuberaa	Mukund	Telugu	Bilingual film
2025	Andhra King Taluka	Film Producer	Telugu	

==== Web series ====
Year	Film	Role	Platform	Notes
2019	Thiravam		ZEE5	
2021	The Family Man	Deepan	Amazon Prime Video	Hindi series
2021	Navarasa	Ganesan	Netflix	Episode: "Roudhram"
2021	Navarasa	Chakravarthy	Netflix	Episode: "Thunindha Pinn"
2022	Tamil Rockerz	Madhi	SonyLIV	

=== Dubbing artist ===
Year	Film	Actor	Role	Notes
1997	Iruvar	Gowtham Sundararajan	Elango	
2010	Raavanan	Munna	Sakkarai	
2013	Pattam Pole	Jayaprakash	Narayana Swami	Malayalam film
2022	Ponniyin Selvan: I	Rahman	Madhurantaka Cholan	
2023	Ponniyin Selvan: II	Rahman	Madhurantaka Cholan	
