= Thirumoolanagar =

Thirumoolanagar Nilaparai
- village
- Interactive map of Thirumoolanagar
- Coordinates: 8.163451°N 77.538224°E
- Country: India
- State: Tamil Nadu
- District: Kanyakumari

Languages
  - Official: Tamil
- Time zone: UTC+5:30 (IST)
- PIN: 629401
- Vehicle registration: TN 74
- Nearest city: Nagercoil
- Lok Sabha constituency: Kanyakumari

Thirumoolanagar is a village with about 175 households and a population of 800 in the Kanyakumari district in the state of Tamil Nadu in India. It falls under the Agastheeswaram taluk of Tamil Nadu. It also borders Tirunelveli district.

== History and religion ==
Thirumoolanagar has nearly 99% Catholic population. It emerged as a separate Parish from Azhagappapuram in year July 2015. It is famous for St. George Church. The annual feast starts on 14 April of every year with a Flag Hoisting followed by a ten-day Mass and adoration. The ninth and tenth day are marked with a car procession to St. George. Carnival ends with High Mass in front of the Holy Cars along with Flag Lowering. The Roman Catholics and parish are administered by the Thoothukudi (Tuticorin) diocese.

== Location and transport ==
Thirumoolanagar is located 8 km from Kanyakumari and 16 km from Nagercoil, both towns has the nearest Railway Stations. National Highway 7 passes near by which links Kashmir and Kanyakumari. Trivandrum International Airport is the nearest airport. Nearby main bus stop is at Azhagappapuram which is 2 km away from Thirumoolanagar. Frequent Auto Rickshaws(Fare Rs.50 Feb 2018) available to Thirumoolanagar.
