= Shabana Shajahan Aryan =

Indian television actress (born 1993)

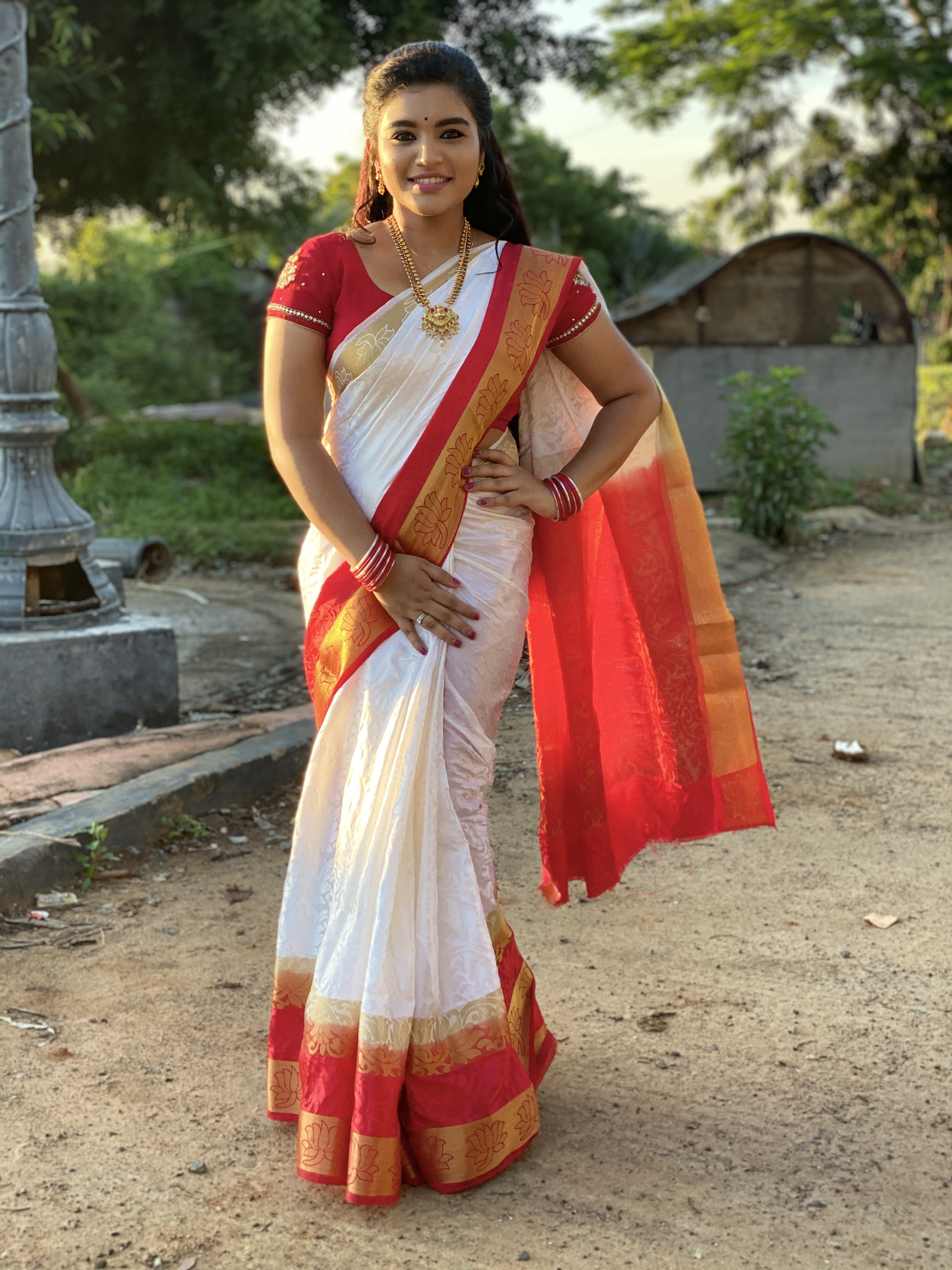
- Shabana in 2019
- Born: Shabana Shajahan; 29 August 1993 (age 33); Mumbai, Maharashtra, India
- Other name: Shabana Aryan
- Occupation: Actress
- Years active: 2016–present
- Notable work: Sembaruthi; Cooku with Comali season 6
- Spouse: Aryan (m. 2021)

Shabana Shajahan Aryan (née Shajahan; born 29 August 1993) is an Indian actress who works in Tamil and Malayalam television industry. Her notable roles include Parvathi in Zee Tamil's Sembaruthi (2017–22) and as a contestant in Star Vijay's Cooku with Comali season 6 (2025) where she later emerged as the runner-up.

== Early life ==
Shabana was born on 29 August 1993 in Mumbai, Maharashtra to a Malayali Muslim family.

== Career ==
Shabana made her television debut with Malayalam TV's Vijayadashami (2016). Her breakthrough came with Zee Tamil's Sembaruthi (2017–22), in which she was cast as Parvati, love interest of Karthik Raj's character. The show was well received by the audience and gained high TRPs. In March 2023, Shabana started playing Anjali in the Sun TV's drama Mr. Manaivi. Later she quit due personal commitment.

In 2025, she participated as a contestant in the comedy cooking reality show Cooku with Comali season 6 which aired on Star Vijay.

== Personal life ==
In November 2021, Shabana married model and actor Aryan in Chennai. Aryan, whose birth name is Velu Lakshmanan, also works in Tamil television and is well known for his roles in the serials Baakiyalakshmi (2020–22) and Meenakshi Ponnunga (2022–24). Shabana has adopted her husband's name and is now known as Shabana Shajahan Aryan.

== Filmography ==
Year	Title	Role	Language	Notes
2026	Thalaivar Thambi Thalaimaiyil	Divya	Tamil	Cameo appearance

== Television ==
Year	Title	Role	Language	Network	Notes	Ref.
2016	Vijayadashami	Unnamed	Malayalam	Surya TV		
2017–2022	Sembaruthi	Parvathi Adhithya	Tamil	Zee Tamil		
2023–2024	Mr. Manaivi	Anjali	Tamil	Sun TV	Replaced by Debjani Modak	
2025	Cooku with Comali season 6	Contestant	Tamil	Star Vijay	1st Runner-Up	
2025–2026	Police Police	Lalithambika	Tamil	JioHotstar		
2026	Cooku with Comali season 7	Senior cook	Tamil	Star Vijay		

== See also ==
- List of Indian television actresses
