= Joy Crizildaa =

Indian wedding stylist

- Born: August 28, 1988 (age 37); Chennai, Tamil Nadu
- Occupations: Wedding stylist, entrepreneur
- Spouse: J.J. Fredrick (m. 2018; div. 2023)
- Children: 2

Joy Crizildaa is an Indian wedding stylist who works in the Tamil film industry.

== Career ==
Crizildaa pursued her early career as an assistant director while working as an intern with Star Vijay. She also founded the Indian fashion design brand Signature in 2014. She made her film debut as a costume designer in Rajathandhiram.

== Personal life ==
Crizildaa released images on social media in 2025 indicating that she married Indian chef and actor Madhampatty Rangaraj. She later lodged a police complaint against Rangaraj, alleging cheating and criminal intimidation, leading to the couple's separation that same year. Crizildaa has a son born on 30 October 2025.

== Filmography ==
- Jilla (2014)
- Rajathandhiram (2015)
- Darling (2015)
- Miruthan (2016)
- Kanithan (2016)
- Velainu Vandhutta Vellaikaaran (2016)
- Enakku Innoru Per Irukku (2016)
- Rekka (2016)
- Bruce Lee (2017)
- Kathanayagan (2017)
- Hara Hara Mahadevaki (2017)
- Richie (2017)
- Ulkuthu (2017)
- Velaikkaran (2017)
- Silukkuvarupatti Singam (2018)
