= Udhaya (film) =

2004 Tamil-language action film

- Theatrical release poster
- Directed by: Azhagam Perumal
- Written by: Azhagam Perumal (story & screenplay); Sujatha (dialogues)
- Produced by: Pyramid Natarajan
- Starring: Vijay; Simran
- Cinematography: Priyan
- Edited by: Raja Mohammad
- Music by: Songs: A. R. Rahman; Background Score: Pravin Mani
- Production company: Pyramid Entertainment
- Release date: 26 March 2004
- Running time: 122 minutes
- Country: India
- Language: Tamil

Udhaya is a 2004 Indian Tamil-language action film directed by Azhagam Perumal. The film stars Vijay in the titular character alongside Simran, while Vivek, Nassar and Rajesh play supporting roles. The soundtrack for the film was composed by A. R. Rahman and the background score was by his associate Pravin Mani as Rahman was unavailable due to scheduling issues. The editing was done by Raja Mohammad, and the cinematography by Priyan.

== Plot ==
Udhayakumaran (Udhaya) is a college student who does research on subatomic physics. He is offered a research position at Princeton University due to his ground-breaking research papers. However, he declines the offer and becomes a lecturer in his college, where he meets Vasanthi, and they fall in love with each other. Udhaya later discovers that she has already been engaged and decides to move to another city. With the help of Basheer, he finds a job as a reporter in Chennai. Unfortunately, Basheer dies in a bomb blast, and Udhaya unwittingly gets to meet the people responsible for Basheer's death, who introduce him to their boss Dhananjay Veeran, who poses as a crusader with veiled intentions. Udhaya sympathises with the crusaders and helps build an instrument to break granite slabs, aiding manual labour. Later, he builds a bomb born out of his research and gives it to Veeran to help their cause in supporting labourers. However, Veeran uses the bomb on a train without Udhaya's knowledge, killing many innocent people and framing Udhaya for the bomb blast, who gets arrested for a crime he did not commit. En route from the court, the police vehicle is caught in a puddle, and Udhaya gets a chance to escape. On the run, he stumbles upon Veeran and his accomplice discussing a plot to bomb a school bus, and then, he comes to the realisation that Veeran is the culprit. Udhaya manages to save the school kids from the explosion. Veeran arrives and attempts to shoot Udhaya. A fight ensues in which Veeran is thrown into the flames of the wreckage. Udhaya is arrested and tried in court, where he pleads not guilty and is released, embracing Vasanthi as the credits roll.

== Cast ==
- Vijay as Udhayakumaran (Udhaya)
- Simran as Vasanthi
- Nassar as Dhananjay Veeran
- Vivek as Basheer
- Rajesh as Muthuswamypillai
- Pyramid Natarajan as Newspaper Editor
- Thalaivasal Vijay as Police Officer
- Delhi Ganesh as Lawyer
- Gowtham Sundararajan as David John
- Bala Singh as Vanji
- Mohan Raman as Professor
- Kumar Natarajan as Ponmala Sesha Jagan
- Shanti Williams as Vasanthi's mother
- Crane Manohar as Saamiyar (Priest)
- R. Sundaramoorthy as Niranjan
- Raviraj as Professor
- Krishna as Venkat Raman
- Sophiya Haque as item number "Thiruvellikeni Rani"
- Sridhar as dancer "Pookum Malarai"
- Sriranjani as Udhaya's elder sister (uncredited appearance in the song "Enna Enna")
- G. Marimuthu as Man praising Udhaya (uncredited role)

== Production ==
Azhagam Perumal, an assistant to director Mani Ratnam in the 1990s, was supposed to make his directorial debut with the project. Simran was signed on to be a part of the film and the team began shoot as early as November 1998, with former Chief Election Commissioner of India, T. N. Seshan, also said to portray a key role. An item number was shot in 2000 with Vijay and Sophia Haque for the film. Producer Natarajan later replaced Seshan.

The film's delay led to Azhagam Perumal being labelled by the media as an "unlucky director", as his first film prior to this, which was supposed to be Mudhal Mudhalaaga starring Arvind Swamy and Karisma Kapoor had also failed to take off. He however signed on to direct the Madhavan-Jyothika starrer Dumm Dumm Dumm (2001), a film produced by Mani Ratnam, which became a commercial success.

Simran briefly announced her retirement from films after her marriage in December 2003 with Natarajan filing a case against the actress for failure to participate in shoot. As the film finally geared up for release in the summer of 2004, trade pundits were insistent that despite the presence of Vijay's other big budget film, Ghilli, time should be allotted to publicise Udhaya too. Eventually the two films released a month apart.

== Music ==
The soundtrack was composed by A. R. Rahman. This is the first Vijay film for which he composed music. One of the songs had lyrics written by Gangai Amaran. The song "Udhaya Udhaya" is set in Charukesi raga.

Track listing
No.	Title	Lyrics	Singer(s)	Length
1.	"Pookum Malarai"	Palani Bharathi	Hariharan	5:24
2.	"Udhaya Udhaya"	Arivumathi	Hariharan, Sadhana Sargam	6:09
3.	"Thiruvallikeni Rani"	Gangai Amaran	Sukhwinder Singh, Karthik	5:16
4.	"Enna Enna"	Ilayakamban	Shankar Mahadevan, Gopika Poornima	5:16
5.	"Anjanam"	Palani Bharathi, A. M. Rathnam, Shaji Thomas	S. P. Balasubrahmanyam, S. Janaki	5:57
Total length:				28:03

== Release and reception ==
The film released on 26 March 2004. It did not get a good opening and became a "total washout" at box-office. Sify wrote "On the whole Udaya is an unbelievable yarn and is an excuse in an amateurish filmmaking. It is roughly constructed, haphazardly shot and even burdened with tedious scenes that suddenly turn into dream scene for the songs!". Cinesouth wrote "The continuity jumps make it very obvious that the film wasn’t completed and that it was somehow put together with whatever was available. There are two incomplete songs (it looks as if the film’s length is shorter than the planned 2000 ft)". G. Ulaganathan of Deccan Herald wrote "The end product looks a bit stale and jaded, disappointing Vijay fans. It is the shortest Vijay film with a running time of only two hours and two minutes. Two songs, which were filmed just a few weeks before the release, are totally out of place. While Vijay looks thin throughout the film, he is quite chubby in the song sequences!".
