= Piyush Manush =

Indian environmental activist

- Born: V. Piyush Sethia
- Occupations: Social entrepreneur; activist
- Organization(s): Coop Forest, Salem Citizens’ Forum
- Known for: Environmental friendly activities
- Spouse: Monika Sethia
- Awards: Bhoomi Award

V Piyush Sethia, better known as Piyush Manush, is an Indian environmental activist.

== Activism ==
Along with few others in 2010, he formed the Salem Citizen's Forum, a collective of urban citizens that engaged in people welfare activities and improving public delivery systems. The Forum adopted the Mookaneri Lake, a 58-acre located at the foot of the Shevaroy Hills, was conserved from massive pollution. He initiated and has been instrumental in reviving water bodies such as Ammapettai Lake, Kundukkal Lake, Ismailkhan Lake, Arisipalayam Pond and Pallappatti well etc. across districts of Salem and Dharmapuri. He also opposed commercial mining in Kanjamalai hills and stood against encroachments and land mafia. He, along with others, received the CNN-IBN Indian of the Year award on behalf people of Chennai in 2015.

=== Coop forest ===
He created the "Coop Forest" in 2009, an initiative for forest preservation, on 1.5 acres of hilly land in Dharmapuri which quickly expanded to 150 acres. Over the years, the Coop Forest has turned into a home for bamboo (Piyush has planted 40,000 bamboo saplings) and guava, lemon, vilvam, neem, rosewood, pungam, custard apple, jack fruit, silk cotton, Singapore cherry, chiku, mango, and other varieties of plants and trees. The Coop Forest experiments with finding alternatives to plastic, steel and cement.

== Arrest ==
On 8 July 2016, Manush was charged with non-bailable sections along with two other activists for protesting against the construction of the Mulluvadi gate over-bridge in Salem by Southern Railway. The arrest caused an uproar on social networks, with some of his co-workers calling for his release. While jailed, Manush was kept in solitary confinement and allegedly tortured, according to his friends and family. He was released on conditional bail on 21 July.

On 18 June 2018, Manush was arrested while protesting the proposed 270-kilometre super highway connecting Salem and Chennai. He was arrested with Actor Mansoor Ali Khan for a speech made by him, 40 days ago in a Village in Salem district. After his arrest, an uproar has broken out in Tamil Nadu, many of the environmentalists and activist has condemned the act and the chief opposition party DMK's working president MK Stalin also issued a statement saying that the DMK will conduct a statewide protest if the police do not stop harassing the people.

== Attack by BJP ==
On 25 August 2019, Piyush Manush visited the Salem BJP office to "ask their thoughts on the economy and the Revocation of the special status of Jammu and Kashmir," as well as to confront them about threats he reportedly got from BJP members. Piyush was live streaming as he went to the office and got into an argument with the BJP workers; the stream ended with BJP workers garlanding him with chappals and attacking him, causing him to drop his phone. Other recordings that aired on television afterwards showed BJP members attacking Piyush Manush in the sight of multiple police officers who tried to stop the attack. Politicians and activists showed their support for Piyush Manush and criticized the BJP for the violent attack as the videos circulated on social media.
