= Thangadurai =

Thangadurai தங்கத்துரை
- Pronunciation: Taṅkatturai
- Gender: Male
- Language: Tamil

Origin
- Region of origin: Southern India; North-eastern Sri Lanka

Other names
- Alternative spelling: Thangathurai

Thangadurai or Thangathurai (Tamil: Taṅkatturai) is a Tamil male given name. Due to the Tamil tradition of using patronymic surnames it may also be a surname for males and females.

== Notable people ==
=== Given name ===
- Thangadurai (actor) (born 1990), Indian film actor
- A. Thangathurai (1937–1997), Sri Lankan politician
- Thomas Thangathurai William, Sri Lankan politician

=== Surname ===
- Michael Thangadurai (born 1983), Indian actor
- Thangadurai Samuel, Indian musician
- Venkataraman Thangadurai, Canadian scientist

== Alias ==
- Thangadurai (died 1983), Sri Lankan militant
