= Soundariya Nanjundan =

Indian actress (born 1995)

- Born: Soundariya Nanjundan; 5 August 1995 (age 31); Bangalore, Karnataka, India
- Education: University of Madras
- Occupations: Actress; television personality
- Years active: 2018–present
- Known for: Villa To Village; Vera Maari Office; Bigg Boss 8

Soundariya Nanjundan (born 5 August 1995) is an Indian actress and television personality who predominantly appears in Tamil film and television. In 2018, she made her debut in the talent reality show Villa to Village and emerged as the 4th runner-up. Followed by her television appearance she played supporting roles in multiple films. In 2024, she participated in the reality show Bigg Boss 8 and emerged as the 1st runner-up.

== Early life ==
Soundariya was born in Bangalore, Karnataka on 5 August 1995 in a Kannada speaking family. At a very young age Soundariya's parents migrated to Chennai, Tamil Nadu to start up a bakery business and since then she has lived in Chennai. She completed her education in Chennai and later studied at University of Madras where she completed her degree.

== Career ==
In 2018, She participated in the reality show Villa To Village and was the fourth-runner up. She later made her acting debut in the film Thamizh Padam 2 in an uncredited role as the antagonist's personal attendant. Then, she started in Adithya Varma alongside actor Dhruv Vikram which was released in 2019. She later went on to appear in the 2020 film Darbar portraying Nayanthara's cousin. She later opposed actor Richard Rishi in the action-drama film Draupathi directed by Mohan G. which was also released in 2020.

In 2023, Soundariya was cast as a lead role in the comedy sitcom web series Vera Maari Office which was released on Aha Tamil.

In October 2024, Soundariya appeared on the reality show Bigg Boss 8 as a contestant which aired on Star Vijay, and emerged as the runner-up of the show.

In 2025, she went on to appear in many reality shows in Star Vijay as a guest of honour in shows such as Neeya Naana, Kalakka Povathu Yaaru? season 10 and Oo Solriya Oo Oohm Solriya season 3. She also went on to participate in the comedy-cooking show Cooku with Comali season 6 as a comali.

== Personal life ==
During her appearance in Bigg Boss 8, Soundariya shared her personal experience of falling victim to a scam call that cost her a staggering ₹17 lakhs. She revealed that all the money stolen were her hard earned money from her debut into the industry.

In 2024, Soundariya Proposed to actor Vishnu Vijay on live television during Bigg Boss 8, and he also accepted her feelings. The couple officially started dating after the proposal.

== Filmography ==
- All films are in Tamil, unless otherwise noted.

Year	Film	Role	Notes	Ref.
2018	Thamizh Padam 2	P's PA/Hacker	Uncredited role	
2019	Uriyadi 2	Interviewer	Uncredited role	
2019	Adithya Varma	Dr. Keerthy		
2019	90 ML	Christine "Chris"		
2019	Super Duper	Mona		
2020	Darbar	Lilly's cousin		
2020	Draupathi	Raniya		
2022	Hey Sinamika	Paarvathy		
2022	Nitham Oru Vaanam	Arjun's office colleague		
2022	Kaalangalil Aval Vasantham	Shalini		

=== Television ===
Year	Series	Role	Network	Notes	Ref.
2018	Villa To Village	Contestant	Star Vijay	4th runner-up	
2019	Ayutha Ezhutu		Star Vijay	TV Serial; Supporting Role	
2023 – 2024	Vera Maari Office	Leena	Aha		
2024 – 2025	Bigg Boss 8	Contestant	Star Vijay	1st runner-up	
2025	Neeya Naana	Guest	Star Vijay		
2025	Kalakka Povathu Yaaru? season 10	Guest	Star Vijay		
2025	Oo Solriya Oo Oohm Solriya season 3	Contestant	Star Vijay		
2025	Jodi Are U Ready season 2	Herself	Star Vijay	To perform a dance performance on grand finale	
2025	Cooku with Comali season 6	Comali	Star Vijay		
2025	Bigg Boss 9	Santa Claus	Star Vijay	Christmas special	
2026	Cooku with Comali season 7	Comali	Star Vijay		
