= Police Police (TV series) =

Indian TV series

- Poster
- Genre: Police procedural; Comedy drama
- Written by: Koan; Eraa. Kalai Kadodi
- Directed by: Koan; Chidambaram Manivannan
- Starring: Mirchi Senthil; Jaiseelan Sivaram; Sathya SK; Shabana Shajahan
- Theme music composer: Arun Raj
- Composers: James Victor; Saran Raghavan
- Country of origin: India
- Original language: Tamil
- No. of seasons: 1
- No. of episodes: 100

Production
- Executive producers: Radhamurugan; RJ Shyam Sundar
- Producer: Malarvizhi Thaiselvam
- Production locations: Madurai; Visakhapatnam
- Cinematography: Coolie Soundherrajan
- Editors: P. M. Achuthan; G. P. Karthik
- Running time: approx.25–35 minutes per episode
- Production company: Thai Creations

Original release
- Network: JioHotstar
- Release: 19 September 2025 – 6 March 2026

Police Police (also marketed as Police Police: Murattu Rajavum Thiruttu Muraliyum) is an Indian Tamil-language police procedural comedy drama television series starring Mirchi Senthil and Jaiseelan Sivaram. This series is written by Koan and Eraa. Kalai Kadodi; and directed by Koan and Chidambaram Manivannan for JioHotstar. The plot revolves around SI Raja and Murali, a thief who works at the same police station after being dragged there by lawyer Lalithambika, leading to a humorous and intriguing situation.

The principal characters of the series include Parvathy Venkitaramanan, Shabana Shajahan, Sujitha, Sathya SK, Vincent Roy and Vadivukkarasi. It premiered on JioHotstar on 19 September 2025 and ended on 6 March 2026.

== Plot ==
The series follows the story of an SI Raja and a thief named Murali, and how they clash and unite for a common purpose later. Giving up his past, Murali seeks redemption by helping Raja solve a crime. After Raja’s aggressive actions in a few cases, his manipulative colleague Vaavar rises to prominence. Meanwhile, Raja tries to reestablish his position by making an offer to Murali to turn a cop.

== Cast ==
- Senthil Kumar as SI Raja
- Parvathy Venkitaramanan as Neelasundaravalli "Neela", Raja's wife
- Jaiseelan Sivaram as Fake Constable Murali, Lalithambika's love interest
- Shabana Shajahan as Lalithambika, a lawyer and Murali's love interest
- Sathya SK as SHO Vaavar, ex-SI, Raja's friend turned to arch-rival turned to friend
- Sujitha as Inspector Arthana, Raja's sister
- Janani Ashok Kumar as Dr. Swetha MBBS, Raja's friend
- Vincent Roy as Muniyandi, a ex-writer
- Vadivukkarasi as Sivagami, Murali's grandmother
- Swathika S as Constable Swency, Jeeva's love interest
- Sebastin Antony as Constable Jeeva, Swency's love interest
- Reka Raj as Constable Iniya
- Indran as Iniya's husband
- Deepa Shankar as Muniyandi's wife
- Myna Nandhini as Murali's mother and Sivagami's daughter (Dead)
- Yogeswaran as Murali's father and Sivagami's son-in-law (Dead)
- Abhishek Shankar as Commissioner Muthupandi, Lalithambika's father (Antagonist)
- Sakthi Kumar as Minister Samuthayam, Ashwin's father
- Madhan as Gowtham, a lawyer and Lalithambika's friend
- Sri Varshini as Sathya, Raja and Neela's daughter
- Yuvashree as Vaavar and Lameez's mother
- Hema Chinraj as Lameez, Vaavar's sister
- KPY Dhanasekar as Ilango
- Praveen Shankar as Constable Kavignan
- Rajesh Gadde as Constable Nithin
- Deepak Dinkar as Ayiravathan (Main Antagonist)

== Production ==
=== Development ===
The series was developed as part of the Hotstar Specials lineup for JioHotstar as a long-form Tamil web series combining crime, comedy, and procedural elements. The first look poster, unveiled on 26 July 2025 with the tagline Murattu Rajavum Thiruttu Muraliyum, emphasized the thematic conflict between police authority and lawlessness.

=== Release ===
The first trailer was released on 4 August 2025, featuring SI Raja interrogating suspects through physical means at the police station, while Murali, a thief, offers valuable clues, highlighting the series' blend of action and investigative drama.

It was announced that the series would be released in Tamil and other Indian languages and made its streaming debut on 19 September 2025.
