= Azhagappapuram =

Azhagappapuram Alagappapuram, Azhagai Mahnagar
- panchayat town
- Nickname: Azhagai
- Location in Tamil Nadu, India
- Coordinates: 8°08′42″N 77°32′20″E
- Country: India
- State: Tamil Nadu
- District: Kanniyakumari

Population (2001)
  - Total: 8,101

Languages
  - Official: Tamil
- Time zone: UTC+5:30 (IST)
- PIN: 629401
- Telephone code: 04652
- Vehicle registration: TN-74
- Nearest city: Tirunelveli, Trivandrum
- Literacy: 82%
- Vidhan Sabha constituency: Kanyakumari

Azhagappapuram is a panchayat town in Kanyakumari district in the Indian state of Tamil Nadu. It is located about five miles northwest of Kanyakumari, the southern tip of India. It is one of the beautiful and model towns in the Kanyakumari district. It falls under the Agastheeswaram taluk of Tamil Nadu. St. Antony's church stands in the middle, which is the major site of attraction of Azhagai.

== Location and transport ==
It spans an area of about nine km^{2}. Kulasekarapuram is situated in the south-west and Myladi in the north-west, near Suchindram, Thovalai, Kanyakumari and Vattakottai. Trivandrum International Airport is the nearest airport. Kanyakumari Railway Station serves the town. Azhagappapuram can be reached from Kanyakumari, Nagercoil and Suchindram by road. National Highway 7 passes nearby. Azhagai's main occupation is agriculture.

== Demographics ==
As of 2001 India census,
