= Madhampatty Rangaraj =

Indian actor and chef

- Rangaraj in 2023
- Born: T. P. Rangaraj; 2 April 1983 (age 43); Madhampatty, Coimbatore district, Tamil Nadu
- Occupations: Chef; actor
- Television: Cooku with Comali
- Spouse: Shruthi Rangaraj
- Children: 3

T. P. Rangaraj, popularly known as Madhampatty Rangaraj, is an Indian chef and the chief executive of the catering company Madhampatty Thangavelu Hospitality. He also acted in the Tamil language films Mehandi Circus (2019) and Penguin (2020), and has been a judge on the cooking show Cooku with Comali since 2024.

== Early life ==
T. P. Rangaraj was born on 2 April 1983. His father, Thangavelu, hailed from Palakkad in Kerala, and came to Madhampatty, Coimbatore district, Tamil Nadu in search of work. He initially sold vegetables on a hand cart and worked odd jobs. He ran a mess in Bangalore for sometime and later returned to Coimbatore to start a food catering business. He went on to work with film crews providing them with meals.

== Career ==
=== Chef ===
Rangaraj studied engineering and wanted to pursue a career in animation. He started working in the food industry while looking for a job, and later took it up as a career. In 2002, he joined his family's catering businesses along with his brother and cousins. He later became the chief executive of the catering company Madhampatty Thangavelu Hospitality. The company has served as a caterer for over 400 weddings including that of celebrities, and for several events including the 2013 Coimbatore Marathon. He is credited for creating the recipe for green guava chutney.

=== Film and television ===
Rangaraj made his film debut with the Tamil romantic drama Mehandi Circus (2020). A reviewer wrote in Deccan Chronicle, "Popular Chef turned hero Madampatti Rangaraj has been aptly cast as the lead protagonist". His next film was the Tamil thriller Penguin (2020) directed by Eashvar Karthic. Since 2024, he has been a judge on the Star Vijay cooking show Cooku with Comali.

== Personal life ==
Rangaraj is married to Shruthi, a lawyer, with whom he had two children. In July 2025, stylist Joy Crizildaa posted images on social media claiming she had married Rangaraj and said that she is pregnant with their child. A month following her initial announcement, Crizildaa filed a police complaint against Rangaraj, alleging cheating and assault. In September 2025, Rangaraj's company alleged that Crizildaa's use of the hashtag "Madhampatty Pakashala" in social media had caused ₹120 million (US$1.2 million) loss due to cancellation of contracts. On 25 November 2025, the Madras High Court ruled that it found no evidence supporting the claim and refused to restrain Crizildaa from using the hashtag. In July 2026, Rangaraj accepted that he was the father of the son born to Crizildaa.

== Filmography ==
Year	Film	Role	Notes
2019	Mehandi Circus	Jeeva	
2020	Penguin	Gautham Siddharth	
2026	Idhayam Murali	Himself	Guest appearance

=== Television ===
Year	Film	Role	Notes
2024–2026	Cooku with Comali	Judge	Reality series; Seasons 5, 6, 7
