= Bant Singh =

Sikh labourer and singer

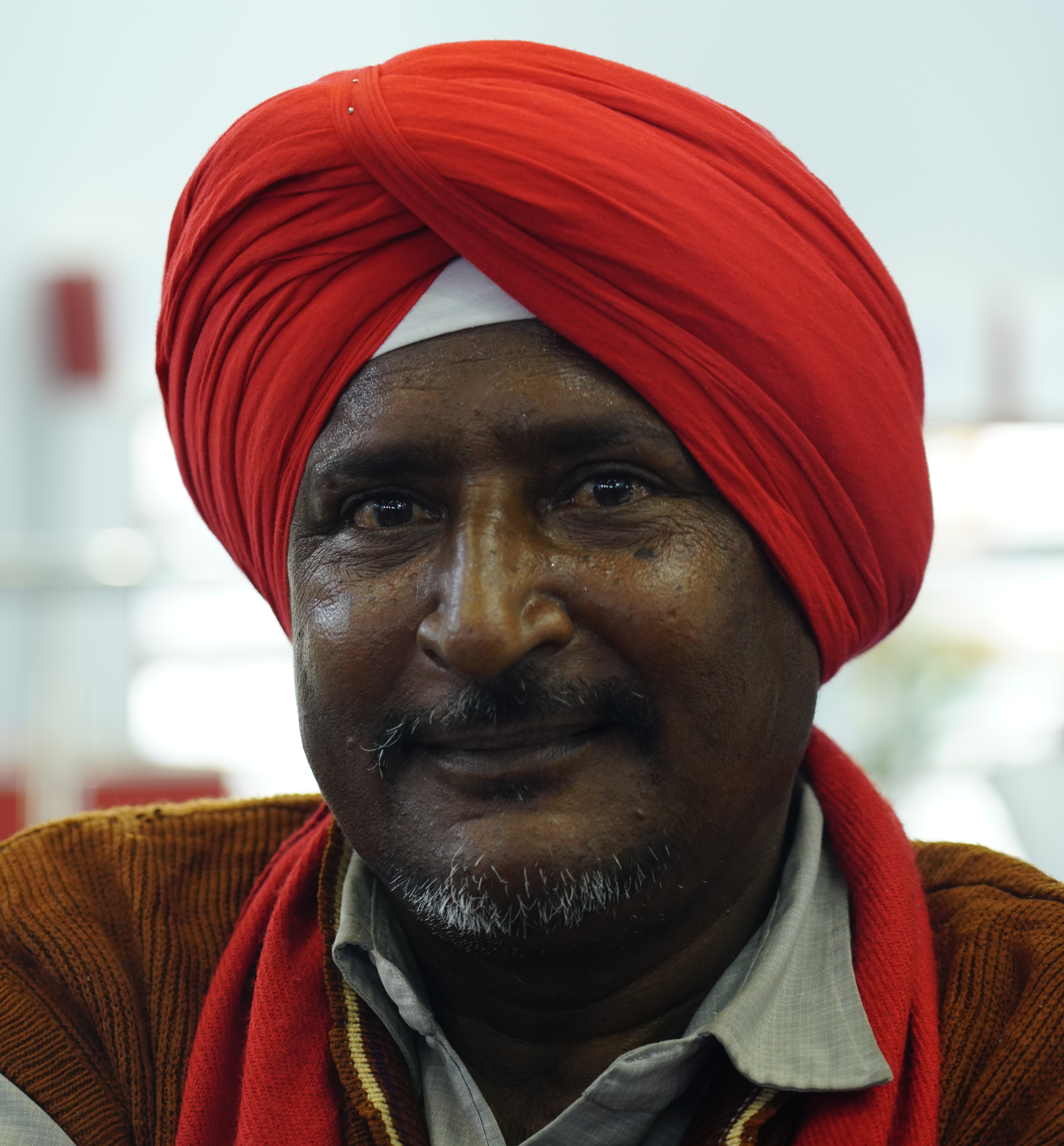
- Born: Bant Singh; Punjab
- Occupation: Labour Rights Activist
- Organization: Mazdoor Mukti Morcha
- Political party: Aam Aadmi Party

Bant Singh is a Sikh labourer and singer from the Jhabhar village in Mansa district, Punjab, India, who has emerged as an agricultural labour activist, fighting against the power of the landowner. Described by Amit Sengupta as "an icon of Dalit resistance he has been active in organizing poor, agricultural workers, activism that continues despite a 2006 attack that cost him both of his lower arms and his left leg."

After his minor daughter was raped by some powerful men in 2000, he dared take them to court, braving threats of violence and attempted bribes. The trial culminated in life sentences for three of the culprits in 2004, "the first time that a Dalit from the region who had complained against upper-caste violence had managed to secure a conviction."

On the evening of 7 January 2006, Bant Singh was returning home through some wheat fields. He had just been campaigning for a national agricultural labour rally to be held in Andhra Pradesh in January. He was suddenly waylaid by a gang of seven men, suspected to be sent by Jaswant and Niranjan Singh, the current and former headmen of his village who have links with the Indian National Congress party. One of them brandished a revolver to prevent any resistance while the other six set upon him with iron rods and axes beating him to a pulp.

He was left for dead, and a phone call was made to Beant Singh, a leading man in Jhabhar, to pick up the dead body. However, Bant Singh was alive, though barely.

He was first taken to civil hospital in Mansa but was not given proper treatment there. Then he was taken to the PGI at Chandigarh, where both lower arms and one leg had to be amputated since gangrene had set in by then, and his kidneys had collapsed due to blood loss. The doctor was eventually suspended for his conduct.

His biography titled The Ballad of Bant Singh: A Qissa of Courage, written by Nirupama Dutt was published in 2016.

The story of Bant Singh was dramatised and featured on the hit TV show Savdhaan India in its special edition of 100 Days 100 Fightbacks.

Bant Singh was featured in 'Chords of Change' TV series and in a 2020 Tamil film 'Gypsy'.
