= Cooku with Comali season 7 =

Indian Tamil reality show

Cooku With Comali: Double Trouble
- Season 7
- Hosted by: Ma Ka Pa Anand (Week 1-11 & 13-present); Shaalin Zoya (Week 1-11); Rakshan (Week 12-present)
- Judges: Chef Damu; Madhampatty Rangaraj; Koushik Shankar; Roja Selvamani
- No. of contestants: 9 Couples

Release
- Original network: Star Vijay
- Original release: 4 April – 30 August 2026

Season chronology
- ← Previous; Season 6

Cooku with Comali 7, also known as Cooku with Comali: Double Trouble, is the seventh season of the Tamil-language reality cooking TV show Cooku with Comali. Ma Ka Pa Anand and Shaalin Zoya became host for the season. However, Rakshan returned as the host from week 12. Chef Damu, Madhampatty Rangaraj and Koushik Shankar returned to the judging panel along with them, actress and politician Roja Selvamani joined the judging panel. The season premiered on Star Vijay on 4 April 2026.

== Twist ==
=== Couple format ===
For the first time, the show introduces a couple-based format where celebrities and their spouses to compete as duo cooks instead of individuals. This puts two contestants must coordinate under pressure while handling one Comali.

=== Senior cooks revenge ===
In week 15, senior cooks from the past few seasons have returned to try their second chance once again. The following is the cooks pairing from week 15 onwards.

== Comalis ==
No.	Name	Entry Week	Exit Week	Status
01	Pugazh	1		Main Comali
02	Sunita Gogoi	1		Main Comali
03	Ramar	1		Main Comali
04	Thangadurai	1		Main Comali
05	Vicky Shiva	1		Main Comali
06	Dolly	1		Main Comali
07	Kuraishi	5		Main Comali
08	Adaavadi Ansar	1		Main Comali
09	Varsha	5		New Comali
10	Soundariya Nanjundan	1	1	Main Comali
11	Soniya	2	3	New Comali
12	DJ Black	4	4	New Comali
13	Sanu	4	4	New Comali

== Couple Cooks ==
S.No.	Name	Episode Entered	Episode exited	Danger zone	Advantage round	Chef of the week	Status	Ref.
1	Anirudha Srikkanth & Samyuktha Shanmuganathan	Episode 1	Episode 44	1	5	5	Winner	
2	Sidhu Sid & Shreya Anchan	Episode 3	Episode 44		6	4	Eliminated	
3	Aravinth Seiju & Sangeetha Sai	Episode 1	Episode 42	-	4	3	Eliminated	
4	Dravid Selvam & Raji Dravid	Episode 1	Episode 36	3	7	2	Eliminated	
5	Gaana Vinoth & Bhagya	Episode 1	Episode 28	4	6	2	Eliminated	
6	Kongu Manjunathan & Rajeshwari Manjunathan	Episode 1	Episode 28	1	2	1	Eliminated	
7	Mahendran & Shantha	Episode 1	Episode 18	3	-	-	Eliminated	
8	Aranthangi Nisha & Riaz Ali	Episode 1	Episode 12	3	-	-	Eliminated	
9	Mano & Jameela Babu	Episode 1	Episode 3	-	-	-	Quit	

== Senior cooks status ==
S.No.	Senior Cooks	Episode Entered	Episode Exited	Advantage round	Chef of the week	Status
1	Umair Lateef	Episode 29	Episode 44	4	1	Eliminated
2	Shabana Shajahan Aryan	Episode 29	Episode 44	4	1	1st Runner-Up
3	Baba Bhaskar	Episode 29	Episode 42	4	1	Eliminated
4	Ramya Pandian	Episode 29	Episode 36	3	-	Eliminated

== Chef of the Week ==
Week	Airing	Cooks	Assistant Cooks	Comali	Ref
1	4 April 2026	Bhagya	Gana vinoth	Soundariya Nanjundan	
1	5 April 2026	Bhagya	Gana vinoth	Soundariya Nanjundan	
2	11 April 2026	Aravinth Seiju	Sangeetha Sai	Ramar	
2	12 April 2026	Aravinth Seiju	Sangeetha Sai	Ramar	
3	18 April 2026	Kongu Manjunthan	Rajeshwari Manjunathan	Dolly	
3	19 April 2026	Kongu Manjunthan	Rajeshwari Manjunathan	Dolly	
4	26 April 2026	Samyuktha Shanmuganathan	Anirudha Srikkanth	Thangadurai	
4	27 April 2026	Samyuktha Shanmuganathan	Anirudha Srikkanth	Thangadurai	
5	2 May 2026	Samyuktha Shanmuganathan	Anirudha Srikkanth	Vicky Shiva	
5	3 May 2026	Samyuktha Shanmuganathan	Anirudha Srikkanth	Vicky Shiva	
6	9 May 2026	Aravinth Seiju	Sangeetha Sai	Thangadurai	
6	10 May 2026	Aravinth Seiju	Sangeetha Sai	Thangadurai	
7	16 May 2026	Raji Dravid	Dravid Selvam	Thangadurai	
7	17 May 2026	Raji Dravid	Dravid Selvam	Thangadurai	
8	23 May 2026	Raji Dravid	Dravid Selvam	Sunita	
8	24 May 2026	Raji Dravid	Dravid Selvam	Sunita	
9	30 May 2026	Samyuktha Shanmuganathan	Anirudha Srikkanth	Varsha	
9	31 May 2026	Samyuktha Shanmuganathan	Anirudha Srikkanth	Varsha	
10	6 June 2026	Samyuktha Shanmuganathan	Anirudha Srikkanth	Vicky Shiva	
10	7 June 2026	Samyuktha Shanmuganathan	Anirudha Srikkanth	Vicky Shiva	
11	13 June 2026	Bhagya	Gana vinoth	Ansar	
11	14 June 2026	Bhagya	Gana vinoth	Ansar	
12	20 June 2026	Sidhu Sid	Shreya Anchan	Ramar	
12	21 June 2026	Sidhu Sid	Shreya Anchan	Ramar	
13	27 June 2026	Sidhu Sid	Shreya Anchan	Kuraishi	
13	28 June 2026	Sidhu Sid	Shreya Anchan	Kuraishi	
14	4 July 2026	Aravinth Seiju	Sangeetha Sai	Sunita	
14	5 July 2026	Aravinth Seiju	Sangeetha Sai	Sunita	
15	11 July 2026	Sidhu Sid	Shreya Anchan	Pugazh	
15	12 July 2026	Sidhu Sid	Shreya Anchan	Pugazh	
16	25 July 2026	Samyuktha Shanmuganathan	Anirudha Srikkanth	Varsha	
16	26 July 2026	Samyuktha Shanmuganathan	Anirudha Srikkanth	Varsha	
17					

Senior : Chef Of The Week

18 July 2026 - 19 July 2026 : Umair Lateef - Dolly

25 July 2026 - 26 July 2026 : Baba Bhaskar - Ramar

8 August - 9 August : Umair Lateef - Vicky Shiva

== Danger zone ==
Week	Airing	Cooks	Assistant Cooks	Comali	Elimination
1	4 April 2026	-	-	-	-
1	5 April 2026	-	-	-	-
2	11 April 2026	-	-	-	-
2	12 April 2026	-	-	-	-
3	18 April 2026	Aranthangi Nisha	Riaz	Ramar	-
3	19 April 2026	Raji Dravid	Dravid Selvam	Sunita	-
4	25 April 2026	Aranthangi Nisha	Riaz	DJ Black	-
4	26 April 2026	Raji Dravid	Dravid Selvam	Dolly	-
5	2 May 2026	-	-	-	-
5	3 May 2026	-	-	-	-
6	9 May 2026	Aranthangi Nisha	Riaz	Vicky Shiva	Aranthangi Nisha & Riaz
6	10 May 2026	Raji Dravid	Dravid Selvam	Ansar	Aranthangi Nisha & Riaz
7	16 May 2026	Bhagya	Gaana Vinoth	Sunita	-
7	17 May 2026	Shantha	Mahendran	Vicky Shiva	-
8	23 May 2026	Bhagya	Gaana Vinoth	Ramar	-
8	24 May 2026	Shantha	Mahendran	Thangadurai	-
9	30 May 2026	Bhagya	Gaana Vinoth	Ramar	Shantha & Mahendran
9	31 May 2026	Shantha	Mahendran	Ansar	Shantha & Mahendran
10	6 June 2026	-	-	-	-
10	7 June 2026	-	-	-	-
11	13 June 2026	-	-	-	-
11	14 June 2026	-	-	-	-
12	20 June 2026	-	-	-	-
12	21 June 2026	-	-	-	-
13	27 June 2026	-	-	-	-
13	28 June 2026	-	-	-	-
14	30 May 2026	Bhagya	Gaana Vinoth	Kuraishi	Manjunathan & Rajeshwari
14	30 May 2026	Manjunathan	Rajeshwari	Dolly	Manjunathan & Rajeshwari
14	31 May 2026	Samyuktha Shanmuganathan	Anirudha Srikkanth	Ramar	Gaana Vinoth & Bhagya

== Pairing ==
=== Couple Cooks pairing ===
Cooks	Week 1	Week 2	Week 3	Week 4	Week 5	Week 6	Week 7	Week 8	Week 9	Week 10	Week 11	Week 12	Week 13	Week 14	Week 15	Week 16	Week 17
Aravinth & Sangeetha	Ramar	Ramar	Pugazh	Ansar		Thangadurai	Ramar	Vicky Shiva	Sunita	_	Dolly	Kuraishi	Ramar	Sunita	Dolly		
Anirudha & Samyuktha	Ansar	Soniya	Ansar	Thangadurai	Vicky Shiva	Dolly	Ansar	Dolly	Varsha	Vicky Shiva	Vicky Shiva	Thangadurai	Sunita	Ramar	Ansar		
Dravid & Raji	Dolly	Ansar	Sunita	Dolly	Dolly	Ansar	Thangadurai	Sunita	Dolly	Varsha	Pugazh	Vicky Shiva	Vicky Shiva	Pugazh	Ramar		
Sidhu & Shreya	—N/a	Sunita	Thangadurai	Vicky Shiva	Varsha		Pugazh	Ansar	Pugazh	Pugazh	Sunitha	Ramar	Kuraishi	Vicky Shiva	Pugazh		
Vinoth & Bhagya	Soundariya	Vicky Shiva	Soniya	Sunita		Ramar	Sunita	Ramar	Ramar	_	Ansar	Sunita	Dolly	Kuraishi	Eliminated (Episode 28)		
Manjunathan & Rajeshwari	Vicky Shiva	Dolly	Dolly	Sanu	Ramar	Kuraishi	Dolly	Pugazh	Vicky Shiva	Adavadi Ansar	Ramar	Dolly	Pugazh	Dolly	Eliminated (Episode 28)		
Mahendran & Shantha	Pugazh	Thangadurai	Vicky Shiva	Pugazh	Kuraishi	Sunita	Vicky Shiva	Thangadurai	Ansar	Eliminated (Episode 18)							
Nisha & Riaz	Thangadurai	Pugazh	Ramar	DJ Black	Pugazh	Vicky shiva	Eliminated (Episode 12)										
Mano & Jammela	Sunita	Quit (Episode 3)															

Week 10 Battle Between Junior and Senior

Chef of the Week
Golden Apron
Advantage Task Winner
Danger Zone
Elimination Round
Eliminated

=== Senior Cooks Pairing ===
Cooks	Week 15	Week 16	Week 17
Baba Bhaskar	Varsha	Pugazh	Ramar
Ramya Pandian	Thangadurai	Ramar	Ansar
Shabana Shajahan Aryan	Sunitha	Sunitha	Pugazh
Umair Lateef	Vicky Shiva	Dolly	Thangadhurai

Chef of the Week
Golden Apron
Advantage Task Winner

== Pairing Matrix ==
Cooks	Pugazh	Sunita	Ramar	Kuraishi	Thangadurai	Vicky Shiva	Soundariya	Dolly	Ansar	Soniya	Varsha	DJ Black	Sanu
Aravinth & Sangeetha	2 Week 3	2 Week 9 Week 14	4 Week 1 Week 2 Week 7 Week 13	1 Week 12	1 Week 6	1 Week 8	—N/a	2 Week 11; Week 15	2 Week 4 Week 5	—N/a	—N/a	—N/a	—N/a
Anirudha & Samyuktha	—N/a	1 Week 13	1 Week 14	—N/a	2 Week 4 Week 12	3 Week 5 Week 10; Week 11	—N/a	2 Week 6 Week 8	4 Week 1 Week 3 Week 7 Week 15	1 Week 2	1 Week 9	—N/a	—N/a
Nisha & Riaz	2 Week 2 Week 5	—N/a	1 Week 3	—N/a	1 Week 1	1 Week 6	—N/a	—N/a	—N/a	—N/a	—N/a	1 Week 4	—N/a
Vinoth & Bhagya	—N/a	3 Week 4 Week 5 Week 12	3 Week 6 Week 8 Week 9	1 Week 14	—N/a	1 Week 2	1 Week 1	1 Week 13	1 Week 11	1 Week 3	—N/a	—N/a	—N/a
Manjunathan & Rajeshwari	2 Week 8 Week 13	—N/a	2 Week 5 Week 11	1 Week 6	—N/a	2 Week 1 Week 9	—N/a	5 Week 2 Week 3 Week 7 Week 12; Week 14	1 Week 10	—N/a	—N/a	—N/a	1 Week 4
Mahendran & Shantha	2 Week 1 Week 4	1 Week 6	—N/a	1 Week 5	1 Week 2	2 Week 3 Week 7	—N/a	—N/a	1 Week 9	—N/a	—N/a	—N/a	—N/a
Dravid & Raji	2 Week 11; Week 14	1 Week 3	1 Week 15	—N/a	—N/a	2 Week 12; Week 13	—N/a	4 Week 1 Week 4 Week 5 Week 9	2 Week 2 Week 6	—N/a	—N/a	—N/a	—N/a
Siddhu & Shreya	4 Week 7 Week 9 Week 10; Week 15	2 Week 2 Week 11	1 Week 12	1 Week 13	1 Week 3	2 Week 4 Week 14	—N/a	—N/a	1 Week 8	—N/a	2 Week 5 Week 6	—N/a	—N/a
Mano & Jameela Babu	—N/a	1 Week 1	—N/a	—N/a	—N/a	—N/a	—N/a	—N/a	—N/a	—N/a	—N/a	—N/a	—N/a

== Casting ==
The previous year's comalis Pugazh, Thangadurai, Sunita Gogoi, Ramar, Dolly, Kuraishi and Soundariya Nanjundan returned to participate in the show. Ansar has came back a comali after making his recent appearance in season 5. Social media fame Soniya was added as the newest comali this season.
