= Selvakumar S. K. =

Indian cinematographer

- Born: Chennai, Tamil Nadu, India
- Education: Madras Christian College
- Occupation: Cinematographer
- Years active: 2016–present
- Notable work: Maanagaram (2017); Gypsy (2020)

Selvakumar S. K. is an Indian cinematographer who works in the Tamil film industry. He is best known for his works in Maanagaram, Mehandi Circus, and Gypsy.

== Career ==
Selvakumar assisted cinematographer, George C. Williams in Raja Rani and Kaththi. He made his feature film debut with Maanagaram (2017), and garnered high acclaim for his work in the film. Selvakumar worked on several films including Gypsy (2020) and Dharala Prabhu. Regarding his work in Gypsy, a critic noted that "Selvakumar’s camera switches between its role as a silent spectator when Gypsy goes about his daily duties and, at the same time, breathtakingly captures the gorgeous locations in all its splendour".

== Filmography ==
Key
†	Denotes films that have not yet been released

- All films are in Tamil, unless otherwise noted.

List of Selvakumar S. K. film credits
Year	Film	Notes
2016	Aviyal	Segment: Kalam
2017	Maanagaram	Nominated for Best Cinematographer at the 10th Vijay Awards
2017	Hara Hara Mahadevaki	
2019	Mehandi Circus	Nominated for Best Cinematographer at Zee Cine Awards
2020	Gypsy	
2020	Dharala Prabhu	
2020	Putham Pudhu Kaalai	Segment: Coffee, Anyone?
2022	Viruman	
2023	Bagheera	
2023	August 16 1947	
2024	Siren	
2026	Baththa	
