= Raju Jeyamohan =

Indian actor

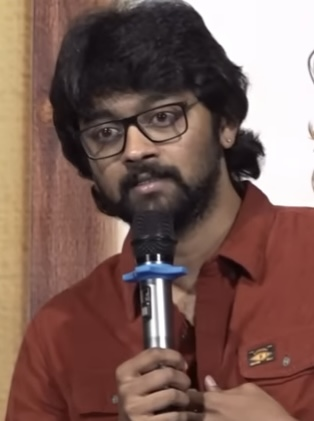
- Jeyamohan in 2025
- Born: 2 July 1991 (age 35); Tirunelveli, Tamil Nadu, India
- Education: B.Sc in Visual Communication
- Alma mater: PSG College of Arts and Science
- Occupations: Actor; Screen Writer; Assistant director; Model; TV host
- Years active: 2012–present
- Height: 185 cm (6 ft 1 in)
- Spouse: Tarika Ramesh (m. 2020)

Raju Jeyamohan (born 2 July 1991) is an Indian actor, television presenter and model in the Indian film industry, who has worked predominantly in Tamil television shows and films. Raju made his debut in the movie Natpuna Ennanu Theriyuma in the year 2019. He has also acted in various serials including Kana Kaanum Kaalangal, Kana Kaanum Kalangal Kalloori Salai, Andal Azhagar, and Saravanan Meenatchi on Vijay Television. In 2022, he emerged as the winner of the reality television show Bigg Boss 5. In 2025, he participated in Cooku with Comali season 6 in which he also emerged as the winner.

== Personal life ==
Raju was born in Tirunelveli, Tamil Nadu. He did his B.Sc. in Visual Communication from PSG College of Arts and Science in Coimbatore. He married his long-time girlfriend Tarika in October 2020. Before making his appearance on television, he has done many modeling covers and photo shoots.

== Career ==
Jeyamohan started his career by first appearing in the second season of the Coming of age television drama Kana Kaanum Kaalangal in 2012 playing one of the lead roles in the show. Raju was also supposed to be part of Vijay's film Nanban in 2012, however due to personal issues he rejected the offer of the film.

From 2013 to 2016, he portrayed Saravanan's PA in Star Vijay's Saravanan Meenatchi Season 2. One year later Raju also acted in the family drama Naam Iruvar Namakku Iruvar playing the role as Kathiresan.

Raju also acted in a few list of films such as Natpuna Ennanu Theriyuma (2019), Murungakkai Chips (2021) and Don (2022).

In 2021, he participated in the reality television show Bigg Boss 5 on Star Vijay as a contestant and later emerged as the winner.

He also appeared in the celebration show called Bigg Boss 5 Kondattam as a guest and Start Music season 3. Raju also announced that he is taking a break from acting in television and focus more on acting in his upcoming films.

In late 2022, he also started hosting a sketch comedy and chat show called Raju Vootla Party featuring him as the main host and character in the show which aired on Star Vijay.

In 2025, Raju made his debut as a lead actor in the film Bun Butter Jam directed by Raghav Mirdath. The film opened up to positive reviews from critics and praised Raju for his performance. Later that year, he participated in the show Cooku with Comali - Season 6 as a contestant and later emerged as the winner of the season.

In 2026, he signed another film as the lead role in the dark comedy film Almost Nallavan, which also marked his first directional debut. Raju announced that actress Dushara Vijayan will star opposite him alongside actors such as Sathyaraj to also star in the film in supporting roles.

== Filmography ==
†	Denotes films that have not yet been released

=== Film ===
- All films are in Tamil unless otherwise noted.

Year	Film	Role	Note
2015	Thunai Mudhalvar	Guest at Periya Pandi's house	Uncredited role
2016	Manithan	Raju	Uncredited role
2019	Natpuna Ennanu Theriyuma	Raju	
2021	Murungakkai Chips	Saravanan's friend	
2022	Don	Raghu	
2025	Bun Butter Jam	Chandru	
TBA	Almost Nallavan †	TBA	Also film director

=== Television ===
Year	Title	Role	Notes	Channel	Ref.
2012	Kana Kaanum Kaalangal Kallooriyin Kathai season 2	Jeeva Nantham (Jeeva)		Star Vijay	
2013	Kana Kaanum Kaalangal Kalloori Saalai			Star Vijay	
2013-16	Saravanan Meenatchi Season 2	Saravanan's PA		Star Vijay	
2014	Andal Azhagar	Kathiresan (Kathir)		Star Vijay	
2020	Bharathi Kannamma	Varun Mohan		Star Vijay	
2020-21	Naam Iruvar Namakku Iruvar Season 2	Kathiresan (Kathi)		Star Vijay	
2021	Comedy Raja Kalakkal Rani	Contestant	Quit	Star Vijay	
2021-22	Bigg Boss 5	Contestant	Winner	Star Vijay	
2022	Bigg Boss 5 Kondattam	Guest	Celebration show	Star Vijay	
2022	BB Jodigal (season 2)	Host		Star Vijay	
2022	Raju Vootla Party	Himself		Star Vijay	
2025	Cooku with Comali - Season 6	Contestant	Winner	Star Vijay	
2026	Bigg Boss – The Common Man	Judge		Star Vijay	

Preceded by Aari Arujunan	Bigg Boss Tamil Winner (Series 5) 2021-2022	Succeeded by Mohammed Azeem
