= Mehandi Circus =

2019 Indian film by Saravana Rajendran

- Poster
- Directed by: Saravana Rajendran
- Written by: Raju Murugan
- Produced by: K. E. Gnanavel Raja
- Starring: Madhampatty Rangaraj; Shweta Tripathi
- Cinematography: Selvakumar S. K.
- Edited by: Philomin Raj
- Music by: Sean Roldan
- Production company: Studio Green
- Release date: 19 April 2019
- Running time: 125 minutes
- Country: India
- Language: Tamil

Mehandi Circus is a 2019 Indian Tamil-language action romantic drama film written by Raju Murugan and directed by Saravana Rajendran who is also his elder brother on his directorial debut. The film casts newcomer Madhampatty Rangaraj in main lead role and Shweta Tripathi on her Tamil film debut in female lead role while RJ Vigneshkanth and Vela Ramamoorthy play supportive roles. The film's soundtrack is composed by Sean Roldan while Selvakumar S. K. and Philomin Raj of Maanagaram fame are selected as cinematographer and film editor respectively. The film is produced K. E. Gnanavel Raja under his production studio banner Studio Green. This film was released in theaters on 19 April 2019 to positive reviews from critics and performed well at the box office.

== Plot ==
The story starts with a girl making plans to fulfill her sick dying mother Mehandi's (Shweta Tripathi) dying wish. Mehandi keeps asking to see someone one last time. Her family trashes her alcoholic father who abandoned both of them. The girl resolves to bring him back in time for her mother to see him and sets out. Meanwhile, in a bar in Kodaikanal, a drunk Jeeva (Madhampatty Rangaraj) is winning a game of “guess the singer”. He is unstoppable except for a song that was released post-1992. Someone makes a remark that the world stopped for him in 1992. When they play the Ilaiyaraaja song “Oh Paapa Laali” (from Idhayathai Thirudathe), he walks away in anger. The next day, Mehandi's daughter finds Jeeva, who is showing off his knife throwing skills to his friends. She tells him her mother's dying and asks him to meet her mother one last time. Jeeva agrees and they set out to the village in Maharashtra where Mehandi is. Jeeva tells the daughter about the day he first saw Mehandi.

Jeeva runs a cassette shop in Kodaikanal dedicated mostly to Ilaiyaraaja's songs. Mehandi and her family arrive in Kodaikanal with their circus troupe. Mehandi is part of the knife-throwing act as the target just like her mother was for her father and her grandmother for her grandfather. Mehandi and Jeeva fall in love over time. A villager sees them together and informs Jeeva's father, a conservative and aggressive man who does not cross caste-lines, of their relationship. Mehandi's father also sees them together around the same time and is unhappy about it. Jeeva's father warns him to forget the girl. But Jeeva persists and asks Mehandi's father for her hand in marriage. Mehandi's father is not happy but agrees to it on the condition that Jeeva should perform the knife-throwing act with Mehandi as target. Jeeva agrees and asks Jadhav (Ankur Vikal), his friend from the same circus troupe, to train him. Jadhav agrees and after few weeks Jeeva goes back to Mehandi's camp. But when he tries to aim the knife with Mehandi as the target, he is unable to throw the knife at her. He gives up, asks her father to keep Mehandi happy and leaves. That night, Mehandi and Jeeva run away from home to get married with the help of friends. They bump into Jadhav on their way out and Jadhav wishes them the best. While they stay the night at a friend's place, Jeeva's father catches them, beats up Jeeva and burns Mehandi's circus. Mehandi's family decides to go back to Maharashtra and Mehandi, with no other option, goes back with them. When Jeeva recovers, he tries to find Mehandi unsuccessfully. It's been many years now and Jeeva is still looking for Mehandi. He bumps into Jadhav in Bombay who tells him Mehandi is now happily married and even has a daughter. Jeeva resigns to his fate, asks Jadhav to not tell Mehandi about their conversation and he heads back home. He slowly slips into being an alcoholic.

Mehandi's daughter tells Jeeva her mom told them all about her love for Jeeva and her frustration at her forced marriage. She then tells Jeeva the whole truth. Jadhav wanted Mehandi for himself the whole time. When he sees Jeeva and Mehandi elope, he informs Jeeva's father of the elopement. After their circus tent is burned down and the whole troupe heads back home, Jadhav convinces Mehandi's father to give her hand to him over drinks. Mehandi's father emotionally blackmails her to marry Jadhav and she agrees. Her marriage with Jadhav is sadistic and abusive. When Jadhav comes back home after his chance encounter with Jeeva in Bombay, he even tells her that Jeeva is happily married and has a daughter. One night, Jadhav practices his knife-throwing act completely drunk, misses his mark and Mehandi is injured. After that incident, he abandons both Mehandi and their daughter and walks away forever. She tells Jeeva that he was the one Mehandi truly loved.

They reach Kolhapur and Mehandi and Jeeva meet, to the astonishment of Mehandi's father. Mehandi whispers to her daughter to get something and then takes Jeeva to the local village fair. Her daughter gets her the knives from the knife throwing act. Mehandi tells Jeeva to throw the knife around her without fear as she is not afraid of dying. Jeeva, who has been practicing all these years, throws all the knives successfully and the last knife blindfolded. Jeeva and Mehandi hug in happiness while Mehandi's father and daughter look on.

== Cast ==
- Madhampatty Rangaraj as Jeeva
- Shweta Tripathi as Mehandi
- Vela Ramamoorthy as Amaladass, a priest
- RJ Vigneshkanth as Jeeva's friend
- G. Marimuthu as Raajangham
- Ankur Vikal as Jadhav
- Sunny Charles as Mehandi's father
- Pooja Tambe as Mehandi and Jadhav's daughter

== Production ==
The principal photography of the film commenced during early parts of May 2018 and the post production of the film completed in around July 2018. The title teaser of the film unveiled in June 2018. Raju Saravanan also known as Saravana Rajendhiran who previously worked as an assistant director of Raju Murugan made his maiden directorial venture through this project, while the story and dialogues of the film were written by director Raju Murugan. Debutant Madhampatty Rangaraj was chosen to play the male lead role and later Bollywood actress Shweta Tripathi was signed to play the female lead role whose role is assigned to be a stage circus performer in the film. Shweta Tripathi made her Tamil film debut through this venture. The reports also revealed that an elephant has also been selected to feature in pivotal role of the film, as revealed by the film's title.

The director revealed that the real-life circus performers were hired to play other uncredited characters as part of the circus-related sequences. The film was shot in Kodaikanal backdrop, but was also shot in Mumbai, Dindigul and Karnataka. The official teaser of the film was released on 6 January 2018 by actor Karthi through social media.

== Soundtrack ==
The background music of the film was composed by Sean Roldan. The official first single track (which is a folk melody) of the film titled Vellattu Kannazhagi was released on 26 December 2018 on the eve of Boxing Day, which was well received by the audience and went viral on social media. The audio rights of the film were secured by Think Music. Sean Roldan was completely missing in 2018, after a stellar soundtrack like Power Paandi in 2017. With Mehandi Circus, he pitches his talent again strongly.

Mehandi Circus

Soundtrack album by Sean Roldan
- Released: 25 January 2019 (Complete Playlist) 26 December 2018 (Vellattu- Single)
- Genre: Feature film soundtrack
- Length: 21:11
- Language: Tamil
- Label: Think Music
- Producer: Sean Roldan

Sean Roldan chronology
Kaathiruppor Pattiyal (2018)	Mehandi Circus (2019)	Raatchasi (2019)

No.	Title	Lyrics	Singer(s)	Length
1.	"Vellatu Kannazhagi"	Yugabharathi	Sean Roldan	4:10
2.	"Kodi Aruvi"	Yugabharathi	Pradeep Kumar, Nithyashree Venkatraman	4:23
3.	"Love Polladhadhu"	Yugabharathi	Vijay Yesudas	2:58
4.	"Siragi Un Sirippaala"	Yugabharathi	Sathyaprakash, Lalitha Sudha	3:25
5.	"Aavoji"	Sean Roldan	Santhosh Narayanan	2:37
6.	"Veyil Mazhayae"	Saravanan Rajendran	Vignesh Ishwar, Susha	3:38
Total length:				21:11
