= Siren (2024 film) =

Indian Tamil film by Antony Bhagyaraj

- Theatrical release poster
- Directed by: Antony Bhagyaraj
- Written by: Antony Bhagyaraj
- Produced by: Sujatha Vijayakumar
- Starring: Ravi Mohan; Keerthy Suresh; Anupama Parameswaran
- Cinematography: Selvakumar S. K.
- Edited by: Ruben
- Music by: Songs: G. V. Prakash Kumar; Background Score: Sam C. S.
- Production company: Home Movie Makers
- Distributed by: Red Giant Movies
- Release date: 16 February 2024
- Country: India
- Language: Tamil

Siren (also marketed as Siren 108) is a 2024 Tamil-language action thriller film directed by Antony Bhagyaraj, in his directorial debut, and produced by Sujatha Vijayakumar under Home Movie Makers. The film stars Ravi Mohan, Anupama Parameswaran and Keerthy Suresh, Yogi Babu, Azhagam Perumal, Samuthirakani and Ajay.

The film was officially announced in August 2022 under the official title Siren, and in January 2024 the title was extended with 108. Principal photography started in September 2022. It was shot sporadically in several stages, with filming locations including Kanchipuram, Chennai, Karaikudi, Karaikal, and finished by mid-April 2023. The film has music composed by G. V. Prakash Kumar, background score composed by Sam C. S., cinematography handled by Selvakumar S. K. and editing by Ruben.

Siren was initially scheduled to release in December 2023, but was postponed due to unfinished post-production works. The film was released theatrically on 16 February 2024, to negative reviews from critics.

== Plot ==
Thilagavarman, an ex-ambulance driver turned prisoner, gets a parole after 14 years to visit his dying father and daughter Malar in Kanchipuram. Malar gets upset with Thilagan as he is a convict and also blamed for her wife Jennifer's death. Malar learns about Thilagan's parole and stays with her aunt until her father's parole ends. Thilagan reunites with his family and his mother encourages him to see Malar.

Meanwhile, Anbazhagan "Anbu" intends to kill his leader Manickam Thangam, a local minister. Anbu gives ₹50 lakhs to his aide Manikandan to kill Manickam at his bar. Velankanni, Thilagan's shadow police, goes with Thilagan to Annachi Wines and Thilagan sees Manickam Thangam with Anbu at the shop, but Anbu leaves and calls Manikandan. Manikandan arrives and stabs a bleeding Manickam in the neck. The following day, Inspector Nandhini and DSP Nagalingam arrive at the murder scene, where Nagalingam suspects Nandhini of Manickam's death, but she denies the allegation.

Velankanni informs Anbu that the police have found the knife used in the murder and extracted the fingerprints. Anbu attempts to persuade Manikandan to surrender at court. A pathologist explains that Manickam died from an eardrum blast, using metal-like substances to create high-decibel noise to make his nose and ears bleed. Nandhini visits Anbu at his farmhouse. Thilagan and Velankanni meet Anbu, who recognises Thilagan. Thilagan kills Anbu by poisoning his inhaler with hydrogen cyanide. Nandhini deduces that Thilagan is the mastermind behind Manickam's and Anbu's deaths, where she arrests Thilagan in front of Malar.

However, Thilagan gets released due to lack of substantial evidence. It is revealed that Thilagan called Kalimuthu to stab an unnamed corpse in order to seek parole and Thilagan was actually behind Manickam's death. Nandhini's investigation uncovers the body of a missing boy Vicky buried on Thilagan's land. Nandhini's further investigation leads to Manikandan getting arrested. Manikandan reveals that a fight happened between him and Vicky, where he revealed that someone had already killed Manickam before Manikandan stabbed him. Manikandan had later killed Vicky. Nandhini decides to investigate the deaf and mute prisoners. After she shows Thilagan's photo, they recognise him and reveal Thilagan's past.

Past: Thilagan was an honest ambulance driver who fell in love and married Jennifer, who was a deaf and mute nurse at a hospital. Anbu and his goons thrash Thilagan's friend Kathir, but Thilagan saves him. Kathir reveals he was in love with the sister of Nagalingam, but Nagalingam thrashes them since they were from different castes. Nagalingam threatens Thilagan, who remains unfazed. Nagalingam witnesses Manickam stab an injured Jennifer, and Thilagan drives to the hospital despite Anbu's goons chasing him, but Jennifer dies due to her injuries. The police arrest Thilagan for Jennifer's and Kathir's deaths due to falsified evidence by Manickam and Anbu.

Present: Nandhini concludes that Manickam was actually killed by Thilagan and he is going to kill Nagalingam. Using the temple festival to his advantage, Thilagan kidnaps Nagalingam and thrashes him at the temple. Thilagan eventually witnesses Nagalingam dying in an ambulance, thus avenging Jennifer's death. Thilagan returns to prison and Nandhini brings Malar to visit him. Thilagan and Malar share an emotional reunion, after realising the truth.

== Cast ==
- Ravi Mohan as Thilagavarman (Thilagan)
- Keerthy Suresh as Inspector K.Nandhini
- Anupama Parameswaran as Jennifer
- Samuthirakani as DSP S. Nagalingam IPS
- Azhagam Perumal as Manickathangam Annachi
- Yogi Babu as Velankanni
- Ajay as Anbazhagan (Anbu)
- KPY Surendar as Vicky (Vigneshwaran)
- Tulasi as Thilagan's mother
- Chandini Tamilarasan as Kamakshi, Thilagan's sister
- Yuvina Parthavi as Malar, Thilagan's daughter
- Madhankumar Dhakshinamoorthy as SI Moorthy
- Muthukumar as Kalimuthu
- Indumathy Manikandan as Vicky's mother
- KPY Vinoth as Jack
- Pandian as Nadesan.N, Pathologist
- Thirunavukkarasu as Jailer
- Lallu as Manikandan
- Prarthana Nathan as Manikandan's wife
- Vignesh Shanmugam as Kathir
- Abhishek Vinod as Manickathangam's son
- Uday Mahesh as Interpreter
- Priyadarshini Rajkumar as Magistrate (in the past)
- TSR Srinivasan as Magistrate
- Sujatha Babu as Nandhini's mother

== Production ==
=== Development ===
In early April 2021, it was reported that Antony Bhagyaraj, who co-wrote Viswasam (2019), had narrated a script to Ravi Mohan who was impressed. Ravi reportedly agreed to act in the film, while it would be funded by Home Movie Makers. On 29 August 2022, the company made a public announcement, confirming the project. The official title, Siren, was announced. G. V. Prakash Kumar was also announced to compose the score, Selvakumar S. K. would handle the cinematography and Ruben would handle the editing. A muhurat puja was held in early September, with stills releasing later that month. In early November, Samuthirakani and Yogi Babu were announced being part of the cast.

=== Filming ===
Principal photography began on 5 September 2022, with the first schedule in Chennai. The schedule concluded by early November. The second schedule commenced on 10 November in Karaikudi. By early April 2023, the schedule concluded. The third schedule was shot in Karaikal. The schedule reportedly featured a song sequence featuring Ravi Mohan and Anupama Parameswaran. The filming wrapped by mid-April.

== Music ==
Siren

Soundtrack album by G. V. Prakash Kumar
- Released: 29 January 2024
- Recorded: 2022–2023
- Genre: Film soundtrack
- Length: 14:52
- Language: Tamil
- Label: Sony Music
- Producer: G. V. Prakash Kumar

G. V. Prakash Kumar chronology
Mission: Chapter 1 (2024)	Siren (2024)	Rebel (2024)

The music is composed by G. V. Prakash Kumar, in his maiden collaboration Bhagyaraj and second with Ravi after Nimirndhu Nil (2014). The audio rights were acquired by Sony Music India. Later, the makers revealed that Sam C. S. is brought in to compose the film's background score.

The first single "Netru Varai", sung by Sid Sriram and penned by Thamarai, released on 29 January 2024.

No.	Title	Writer(s)	Singer(s)	Length
1.	"Netru Varai"	Thamarai	Sid Sriram	4:34
2.	"Kannamma"	Pa. Vijay	Haricharan	3:06
3.	"Adi Aathi"	Murugan Manthiram	Anthony Daasan, Sinduri Vishal	4:08
4.	"Aagayam Odanju"	Snehan	Harish Sivaramakrishnan	3:04
Total length:				14:52

== Release ==
=== Theatrical ===
Siren was initially scheduled to release in December 2023, but was postponed due to unfinished post-production works. It was released on 16 February 2024 in theatres.

=== Home media ===
The digital streaming rights and satellite rights were acquired by Disney+ Hotstar and Star Vijay. The film was premiered on the streaming platform on 19 April 2024.

== Reception ==
On the review aggregator website Rotten Tomatoes, 0% of 5 critics' reviews are positive, with an average rating of 5/10.

Kirubhakar Purushothaman of The Indian Express rated the film with 2/5 stars and wrote "Jayam Ravi’s film is tolerable as a thriller, with some good ideas. Take them out and it is a regular revenge drama with the same old flashback sequences." Janani K of India Today rated the film with 2/5 stars and wrote "it settles for convenient writing with glaring logical errors and spoon-feeding."
