= Villa to Village =

Reality show

- Genre: Reality; Talent show Game show
- Presented by: Andrews
- Country of origin: India
- Original language: Tamil
- No. of seasons: 1
- No. of episodes: 26

Production
- Production location: Tamil Nadu
- Camera setup: Multi-camera
- Running time: 45-50 minutes

Original release
- Network: Star Vijay
- Release: 10 March – 10 June 2018

Villa to Village is a 2018 Tamil-language reality talent game show airing on Star Vijay every Saturday and Sunday at 21:30 (IST) beginning 10 March 2018. The show was hosted by Andrews.

== Synopsis ==
The show takes twelve city women and relocates them to a village where they have no money and must make ends meet for forty days.

== Participants ==
| No. | Participants | Outcome |
|---|---|---|
| 01 | Riah Kapoor | Winner |
| 02 | Akshara Reddy | Runner Up, All Rounder & Beautiful Face |
| 03 | Upasana RC | 2nd runner up, Real Fighter award & Best Hair |
| 04 | Shilfa | People's favourite award |
| 05 | Soundariya Nanjundan | Best entertainer award |
| 06 | Divya | Eliminated on 10 June 2018 |
| 07 | Abissheka | Eliminated on 27 May 2018 |
| 08 | Meenakshi Govindarajan | Eliminated on 27 May 2018 |
| 09 | Gayathri | Eliminated on 13 May 2018 |
| 10 | Sanam Shetty | Eliminated on 6 May 2018 |
| 11 | Sharon Rosary Marvin | Eliminated on 22 April 2018 |
| 12 | Pavithra | Eliminated on 15 April 2018 |
| 13 | Sharmika | Eliminated on 8 April 2018 |
