= Anirudha Srikkanth =

Indian cricketer (born 1987)

Personal information
- Born: 14 April 1987 (age 39); Madras, Tamil Nadu, India
- Batting: Right-handed
- Role: Batsman
- Relatives: Krishnamachari Srikkanth (father)

Domestic team information
- Years: Team
- 2004–2019: Tamil Nadu
- 2008–2013: Chennai Super Kings (squad no. 77)
- 2014: Sunrisers Hyderabad

Career statistics
Competition	FC	LA	T20
Matches	23	66	71
Runs scored	1,031	2,063	1,257
Batting average	29.45	33.81	26.18
100s/50s	1/7	2/13	0/7
Top score	113	134	77
Balls bowled	78	19	–
Wickets	3	0	–
Bowling average	20.00	–	–
5 wickets in innings	0	–	–
10 wickets in match	0	–	–
Best bowling	1/6	–	–
Catches/stumpings	18/-	18/–	28/–
- Source: ESPNcricinfo, 2 December 2020

Anirudha Srikkanth (born 14 April 1987) is an Indian former professional cricketer. He was born in Madras; his father is cricketer Kris Srikkanth. He has played for Chennai Super Kings and Sunrisers Hyderabad in the Indian Premier League.

An attacking opening batsman, much like his father, Anirudha made his first-class debut in the 2003–04 season as a 16-year-old. He was in and out of the Tamil Nadu Ranji Trophy squad in the following seasons but enjoyed greater success in the limited-overs format and topped the number of runs scored for India under-19s against the touring England under-19 side in 2004–05. His record in the Twenty20 format has been impressive, finishing the third-highest run-scorer in the inter-state Twenty20 in 2007.

== Indian Premier League ==
He had played for Chennai Super Kings (CSK) between 2008 and 2013 in the Indian Premier League.

In the 2010 semi-final against Deccan Chargers, he scored 24 runs from 15 deliveries, hitting two sixes and a four.

His most significant IPL stint came in the 2011 season, where he played 9 games. Given the opportunity to open the batting in the absence of incumbent Michael Hussey, Anirudha started strongly with a vital 64(55) that helped CSK seal a tight two-run victory over the Kolkata Knight Riders in the season opener. However, he was unable to sustain this momentum, and would only go on to score a further 19 runs in the remainder of the season.

In the 2012 season he scored 18 from six balls in a low scoring match against Rajasthan Royals.

In the 2014 mega auction, Anirudha was bought by the Sunrisers Hyderabad for ₹20 lakh. However, he only played a solitary game for the franchise, making 3 runs in 5 balls as the Sunrisers were undone by the eventual champions Kolkata Knight Riders. He was released prior to the 2015 auction, and would not make another appearance in the league.

== Television ==
Year	Series	Role	Network	Notes	Ref.
2026	Cooku with Comali season 7	Contestant	Star Vijay		
