= Mookaneri Lake =

- Kannankurichi Lake
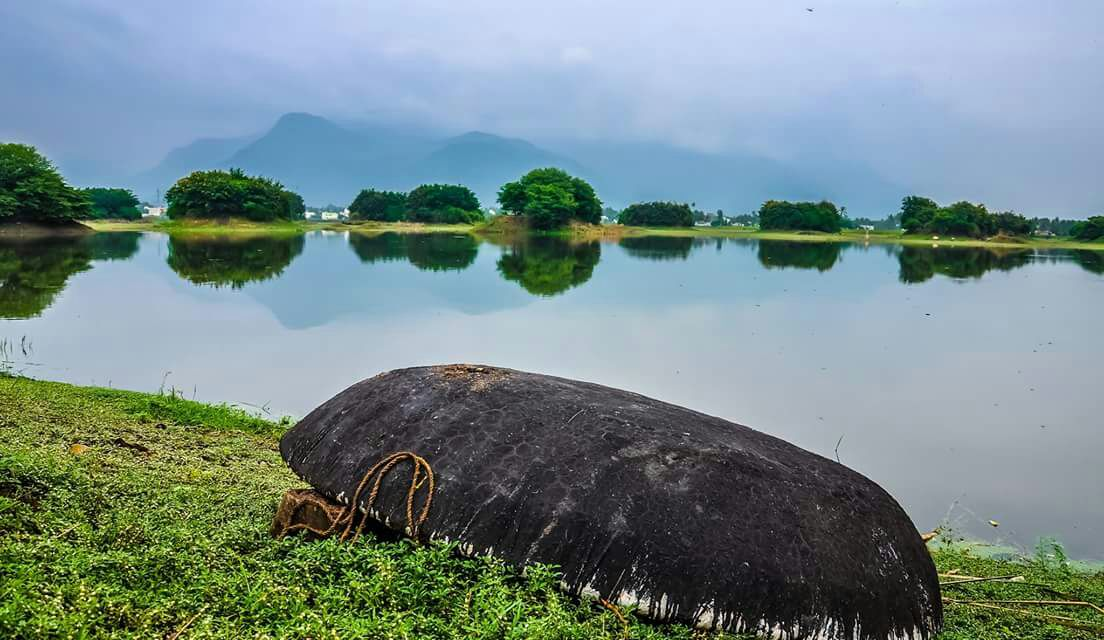
- Mookaneri Lake with the Shevaroy Hills in the background

- Location within Salem Location within Tamil Nadu Location within India
- Location: Kannankurichi, Salem, Tamil Nadu, India
- Coordinates: 11°41′11″N 78°10′45″E
- Type: Lake
- Basin countries: India
- Surface area: 23.5 ha (58 acres)
- Islands: 47
- Settlements: Salem

Mookaneri Lake, also called Kannankurichi Lake, is a lake in Kannankurichi, in the Salem Taluk of the Indian state of Tamil Nadu, that covers an area of 23.5 hectares (58 acres). It is located to the south of the Shevaroy Hills and is a major body of water in Salem. The lake is fed by rainfall, including the hills surrounding Yercaud, which flow into the lake via the Puthu Yeri and Kothukaran Odai streams.

There are 47 man-made islands in the lake. Each island was created by excavating and piling lakebed clay about 10 feet high, and covers an area of a few thousand square feet. Initially, millet was planted on the islands to arrest erosion and help build a soil layer before saplings of neem, banyan, jambul, peepal, and vetiver trees could be planted. The lake islands were populated by nearly 12,000 trees as of 2013.

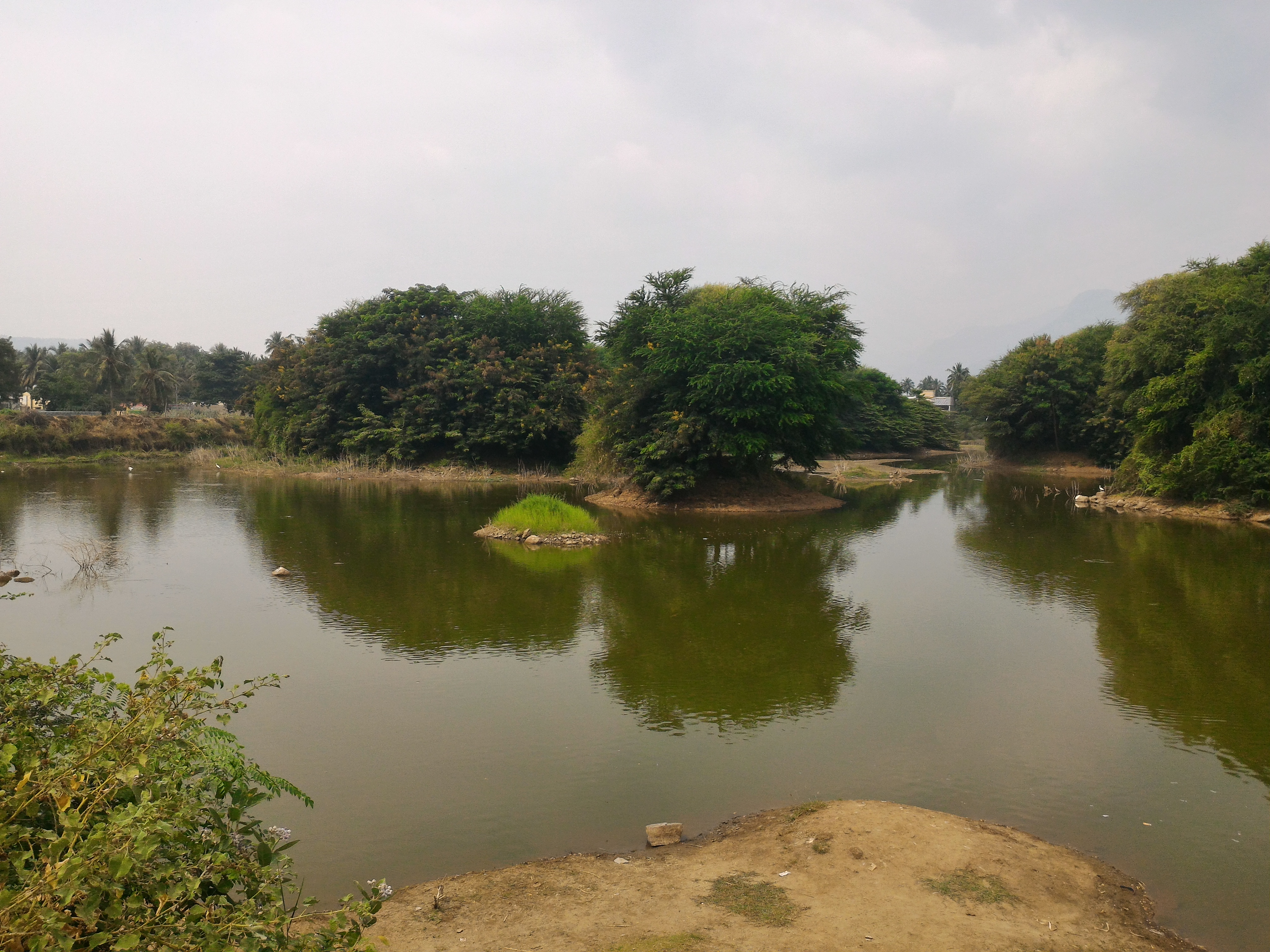
Islands of Mookaneri Lake

== Recreation ==
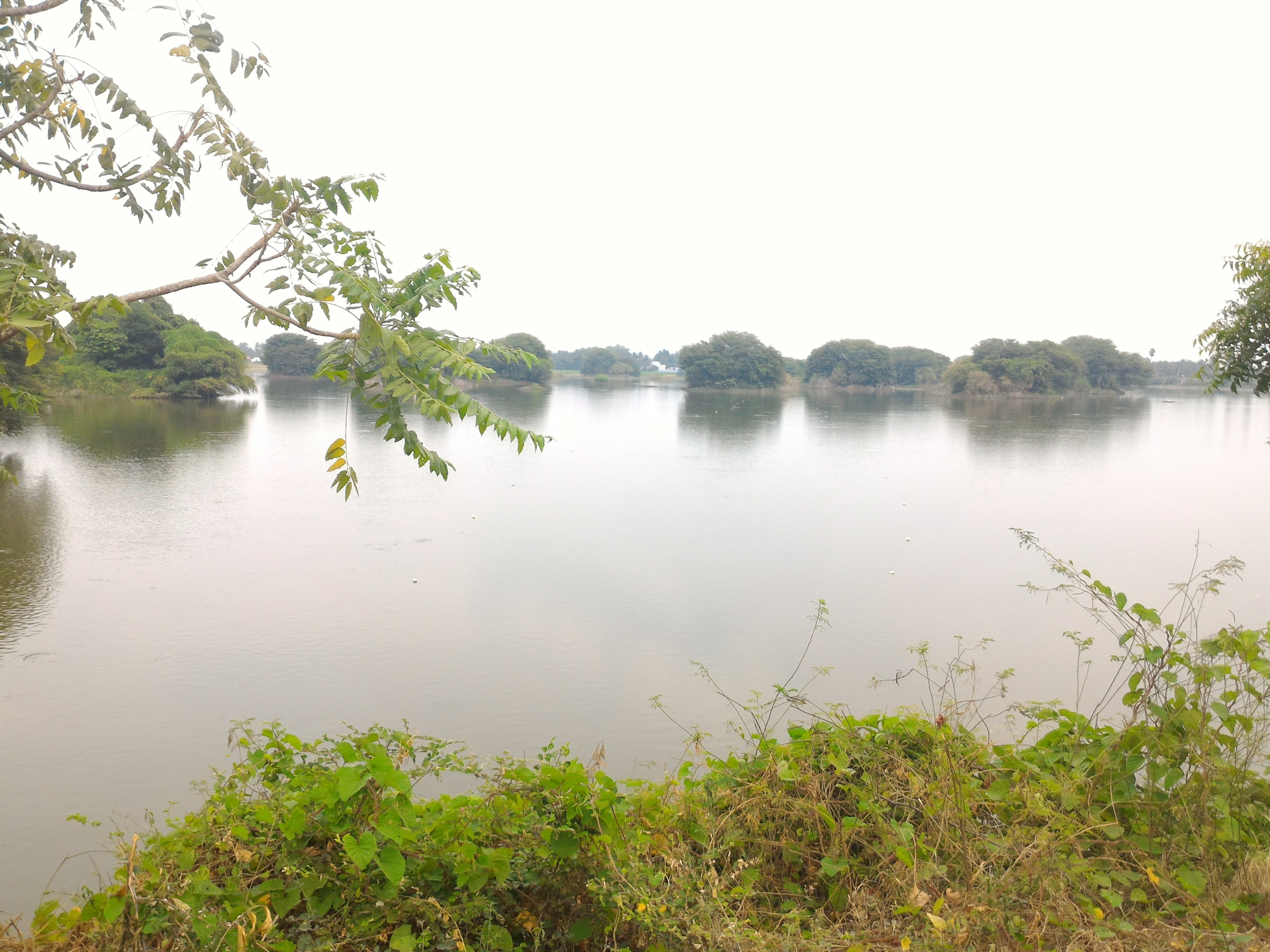
Mookaneri Lake

=== Bird Watching ===
Mookaneri Lake is a popular bird watching destination. The floating islands lush growth of trees help in providing shelter for the birds, like a birds’ sanctum, and their food needs are sufficed by waterholes or the lake. The most commonly sighted birds are Egrets and Kingfishers. Over 169 species of birds have been spotted at the lake. The Pink-feathered Flamingos are magnificent to watch. Apart from this, Garganey, Northern pintail, Grey Wagtail, Common sandpiper, Rosy starling, Whiskered tern, Baillon's crake, Yellow bittern, Paddyfield warbler, Citrine wagtail, Streak-throated swallow, Brown-headed gull, Painted stork, Oriental darter and Black-headed gull are the migratory birds sighted in the lake. Bird watchers and naturalists in the city want to obtain sanctuary status for the lake.

=== Facilities ===
The park has a children's play area and mini auditorium set up in a natural environment, seating arrangements, flower pants on the bunds and walker's path along the lake. Coracles are available to visit the islands of the lake.

=== Fishing ===
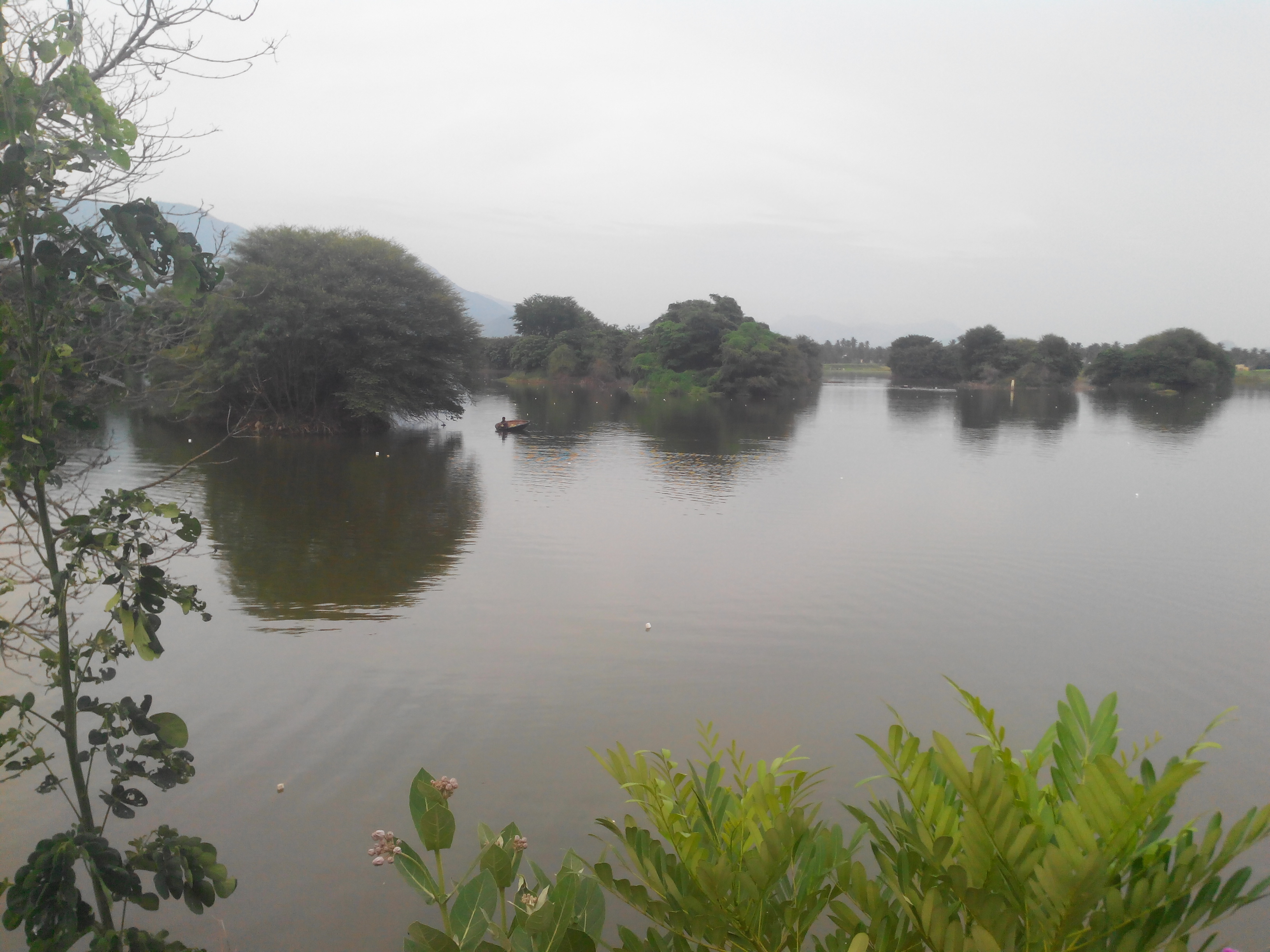
A coracle in the lake

The lake is a source of groundwater recharge for the surrounding areas. The lake has a few varieties of fish, such as rohu, catla kendai and kuruvai. The local fisherman's boats are coracles.

== Environmental concerns ==
During Vinayaka Chaturthi every year there is rampant pollution and damage caused to Mookaneri by the immersing of idols. The idols' toxic wastes can persist in water for ten years and spread from one body of water to another, harming rivers and lakes. The impact can endure up to 100 years when combined with other harmful substances. Salem Citizen's Forum, a collective of urban citizens resurrected the lake at an outlay of Rs. 87 Lakh under the public initiative. The Forum began work at Mookaneri in May 2010 after many pleas to the district administration failed to evoke a response.

== Gallery ==
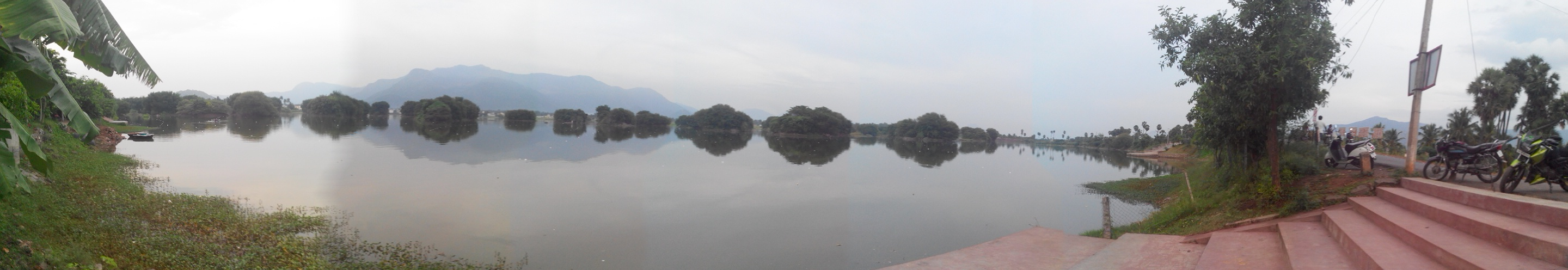

== See also ==
- Yercaud, Tamil Nadu
- Shevaroy Hills, Tamil Nadu
- Salem, Tamil Nadu
