= Venkataraman Thangadurai =

Scottish scientist

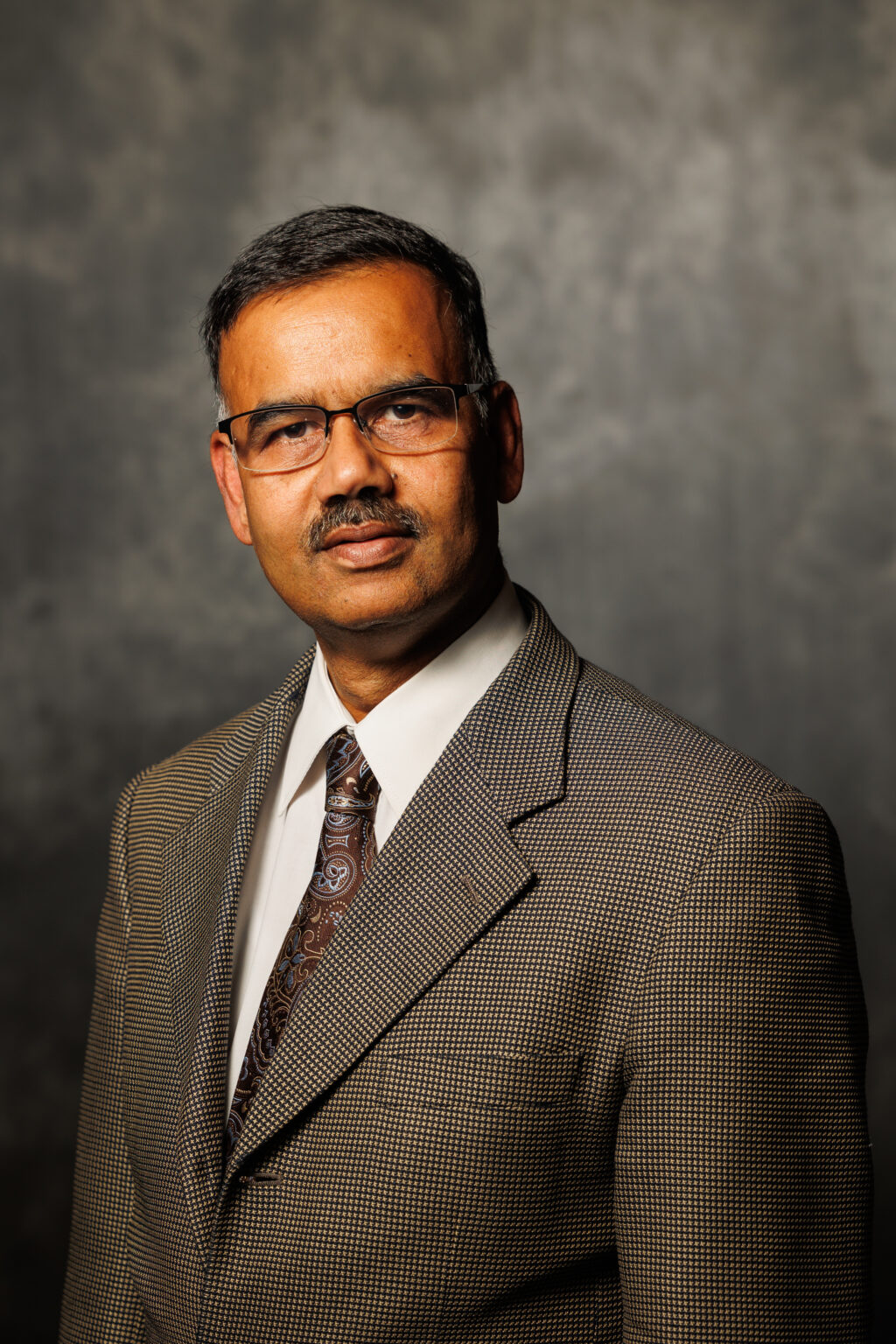
- Citizenship: Canada
- Education: Indian Institute of Science
- Known for: Solid state batteries, Li garnets, Energy Storage, Fuel Cells, Materials Chemistry
- Scientific career
- Doctoral advisor: PhD: Prof J.Gopalakrishnan, Prof A.K.Shukla, PDF: Prof Werner Weppner

Venkataraman Thangadurai is a scientist recognized for his work in solid state ionics and chemistry. He is a professor at the University of St Andrews, specializing in Chemistry.

== Early life and education ==
Thangadurai, who was born in India, earned his Chemistry degrees from various institutions in Tamil Nadu and a Ph.D. from the Indian Institute of Science in 1999. He pursued postdoctoral studies in Germany, receiving a fellowship from the Alexander von Humboldt Foundation and a Habilitation degree in 2004 from the University of Kiel.

== Career and research ==
Thangadurai works on creating new materials for energy storage and conversion, particularly in solid oxide fuel cells, batteries and gas separation membranes. His research focuses on ion transport in solid electrolytes and high-performance materials for energy applications. Thangadurai has done work on advancing Li-based garnets within all-solid-state Lithium metal batteries. Thangadurai co-founded Ion Storage Systems and Superionics Inc. Thangadurai submitted 13 patent applications and has 443 publications He moved to the University of St Andrews in early July 2024.

== Awards and recognition ==
- Battery Division Research Award, The Electrochemical Society, USA (2025)
- HWK-Fellowship, Hanse-Wissenschaftskolleg, Delmenhorst, Germany (2021)
- Research Excellence in Materials Chemistry, Chemical Institute of Canada (2021)
- Parex Innovation Fellow, University of Calgary (2020)
- Peak Scholar, University of Calgary (2019)
- Keith Laidler Award, Canadian Society for Chemistry, The Chemical Institute of Canada (2016)
- Outstanding Invention of 2013, University of Maryland College Park, USA (2013)
- German Academic Exchange Service (DAAD) Guest Professor, Faculty of Engineering, University of Kiel, Germany (2005)
- Alexander von Humboldt (AvH) PDF scholarship, Chair for Sensors and Solid-State Ionics, Faculty of Engineering, University of Kiel, Germany (2002)

== Selected publications ==
- Han, Xiaogang; Gong, Yunhui; Fu, Kun (Kelvin); He, Xingfeng; Hitz, Gregory T.; Dai, Jiaqi; Pearse, Alex; Liu, Boyang; Wang, Howard; Rubloff, Gary; Mo, Yifei; Thangadurai, Venkataraman; Wachsman, Eric D.; Hu, Liangbing (May 2017). "Negating interfacial impedance in garnet-based solid-state Li metal batteries". Nature Materials. 16 (5): 572–579. Bibcode:2017NatMa..16..572H. doi:10.1038/nmat4821. ISSN 1476-4660. OSTI 1433807. PMID 27992420.
- S. Sarkar, B. Chen, C. Zhou, S.N. Shirazi, F. Langer, J. Schwenzel, and V. Thangadurai,* “Synergistic Approach toward Developing Highly Compatible Garnet-Liquid Electrolyte Interphase in Hybrid Solid-State Lithium-Metal Batteries,” Adv. Energy Mater., 13 (8), 2203897 (14 pages) (2023) (cover page)
- T. Boteju, A. M. Abraham, S. Ponnurangam* and V. Thangadurai,* “Theoretical Study on the Role of Solvents in Lithium Polysulfide Anchoring on Vanadium Disulfide Facets for Lithium-Sulfur Batteries,” J. J. Phys. Chem. C. 127 (9), 4416 – 4424 (2023).
- A. Sivakumaran, A.J. Samson, and. V. Thangadurai,* “Progress in Sodium Silicates for All-Solid-State Sodium Batteries — a Review,” Energy Technol. 11, 2201323 (18 pages) (2023).
- A. M. Abraham, T. Boteju, S. Ponnurangam* and V. Thangadurai,* “A Global Design Principle for Polysulfide Electrocatalysis in Lithium-Sulfur Batteries – A Computational Perspective,” Battery Energy, 20220003 (11 pages), (2022).
- V. Thangadurai,* and B. Chen, “Solid Li- and Na-Ion Electrolytes for Next Generation Rechargeable Batteries,” Chem. Mater., 34, 6637–6658 (2022) (Invited John Goodenough at 100 issue).
- A. Ndubuisi, S. Abouali, K. Singh, V. Thangadurai,* “Recent Advances, Practical Challenges and Perspectives of Intermediate Temperature Solid Oxide Fuel Cell Cathodes,” J. Mater. Chem. A, 10, 2196-2227 (2022) (Invited).
