= Kuraishi =

Kuraishi (written: 倉石) is a Japanese surname. Notable people with the surname include:

- Isao Kuraishi (倉石 功, born 1944), Japanese actor
- Osamu Kuraishi (倉石 平, born 1956), Japanese basketball coach

== Other people ==
- Jassim Karim Kuraishi (born 1938), Iraqi sprinter
- Monjur Kader Kuraishi, Bangladeshi politician
- KPY Kuraishi, Indian actor

== See also ==
- Kuraishi, Aomori, a former village in Sannohe District, Aomori Prefecture, Japan
