= Kulasekarapuram =

Kulaseakarapuram Osaravillai.
- village
- Location in Tamil Nadu, India
- Coordinates: 8.143°N 77.496°E
- Country: India
- State: Tamil Nadu
- District: Kanniyakumari

Population (2011)
  - Total: 2,853

Languages
  - Official: Tamil
- Time zone: UTC+5:30 (IST)
- Postal code: 629403

Kulasekarapuram is a village is near to the Osaravillai in Kanniyakumari district in the Indian state of Tamil Nadu.

== Demographics ==
As of 2011 India census, Kulasekarapuram had a population of 2,853. Males constitute 49.2% of the population and females 50.8%. In Kulasekarapuram, 9.6% of the population is under 6 years of age.
