= Science fiction films in India =

List of Indian science fiction films

The genre of science fiction has been prevalent in the Indian film industry since the second half of the 20th century. Beginning in 1952, the English-Tamil film Kaadu was made, which was an Indian-American co-production. The 1963 Tamil film Kalai Arasi, 1965 Telugu film Dorikithe Dongalu, and 1967 Hindi film Chand Par Chadayee also have science fiction in their storyline. The Alien was a science fiction film under production in the late 1960s which was eventually cancelled. The film was being directed by Bengali Indian director Satyajit Ray and produced by Hollywood studio Columbia Pictures. The script was written by Ray in 1967, based on "Bankubabur Bandhu", a Bengali story he had written in 1962 for Sandesh, the Ray family magazine.

In 1987, the superhero film Mr. India was a huge success, which strengthened the hold of sci-fi films in India, especially Hindi cinema. Indiatimes Movies ranks the movie amongst the Top 25 Must See Bollywood Films. Mr. India brought the idea of science fiction to the general population in India. The 1991 Telugu film Aditya 369 was the first time travel film made in India. The film explored dystopian and post-apocalyptic themes in a satirical manner. It was a critical and commercial success and is considered a landmark film in the science fiction genre in Indian cinema. In 2003, the blockbuster film Koi... Mil Gaya marked the beginning of the successful Krrish, which is the first sci-fi/superhero film series in Indian cinema.

2.0 (2018) and Kalki 2898 AD (2024), in the sci-fi genre, have emerged as the most expensive Indian films.

== List of films ==
The following list contains the names of the Indian science fiction films released since 1952. Early 21st century has seen the release of more than 30 such films, compared to the previous 14, there is less info about it now they Indian film classics.

=== Space Opera films ===
The following are the list of space opera science fiction films.

Title	Year	Language	Description
Kalai Arasi	1963	Tamil	Kalai Arasi is a well-blended story of romance, science fiction, action and drama with the main cast of M. G. Ramachandran and Bhanumathi playing double roles. The film was the first in Indian cinema to illustrate a story which describes aliens, alien abduction, alien weapons, space travel and futuristic technology.
Chand Par Chadayee	1967	Hindi	The film stars Dara Singh, Helen. After landing on the Moon, an astronaut and his associate face off against a variety of warriors and monsters from another planet. Directed by T. P. Sundaram.
Amrutham Chandamamalo	2014	Telugu	The film is a spin off of the comedy TV series Amrutham where the characters go on a trip to the moon.
Tik Tik Tik	2018	Tamil	Tik Tik Tik is written and directed by Shakti Soundar Rajan. It features Jayam Ravi, Aaron Aziz, and Nivetha Pethuraj in the lead roles. First Tamil film based on space.
Antariksham 9000 KMPH	2018	Telugu	Directed by Sankalp Reddy starring Varun Tej, Aditi Rao Hydari and Lavanya Tripathi. Received praise for the Visual effects. Film is based in space.
Cargo	2019	Hindi	This philosophical science fiction morbid humor Film is written, directed and co-produced by Arati Kadav, produced by Anurag Kashyap, Shlok Sharma, Navin Shetty, Zain Matcheswalla, Rahul Puri. It features Vikrant Massey and Shweta Tripathi in lead roles.

=== Others ===
Title	Year	Language	Description
Kaadu	1952	English	A Tamil-American co-production, this film was about an expedition to find the cause of strange behaviour of animals in an area. As it turned out, the reason of this abnormal behavior was an invasion of wooly mammoths. This film was the first science fiction film in India.
Maya Manithan	1958	Tamil	Scientist has developed a serum that renders the user invisible.
Naan Vanangum Deivam	1963	Tamil	Scientist has developed medicine for human, to remove bad characteristics and enhance good behaviors.
Shikari	1963	Hindi	Shikari, directed by Mohammed Hussain, starring Ajit Khan and K N Singh as 'Dr. Cyclops' a mad scientist experimenting on humans and gorillas.
Mr. X in Bombay	1964	Hindi	Mr. X in Bombay, directed by Shantilal Soni, is a 1964 Bollywood classic film starring Kishore Kumar, Kum Kum, and Madan Puri.
Dorikithe Dongalu	1965	Telugu	The film features a group of scientists experimenting with flying cars, the invisible man, ray guns, etc. who commit a lot of atrocities using their muscular and scientific powers.
The Alien	1965	Bengali; English	A science fiction film under production in the late 1960s which was eventually cancelled. It was based on a short story named Bankubabur Bandhu ("Banku Babu's Friend") by Satyajit Ray and was about an extraterrestrial by the name of "Mr. Ang" who befriends a Bengali boy while visiting a village in the 1960s.
Karutha Rathrikal	1967	Malayalam	Film starring Madhu, Gemini Ganesan, S. P. Pillai in lead roles and directed by Mahesh. The music director is MS Baburaj and lyrics are by ONV Kurup. It is a film involving a doctor played by Madhu who takes revenge for his uncle's death by using a medicine he invents. This medicine creates split personality. This movie was inspired by The Strange Case of Dr Jekyll and Mr Hyde, a novel written by the Scottish author Robert Louis Stevenson and first published in 1886. It is supposed to be the first Malayalam science fiction film.
Wahan Ke Log	1967	Hindi	The film stars Pradeep Kumar, Tanuja, Johnny Walker . It tells the story of a supposed martial threat on India by aliens from outer space intending to rob the rich of their diamonds.
Sabash Satyam	1969	Telugu	The film stars Krishna and Rajasree. The plot revolves around Satyam who falls in love with Chaya. When Satyam becomes invisible, he must find a way to become visible again and win his love.
Elaan	1971	Hindi	Starring Vinod Mehra, Rekha and Vinod Khanna. Naresh Kumar Saxena lives with his widowed mom and sister, Seema. He works as a freelance photographer and journalist. One day he meets with Mala Mehta and her dad, who is the Editor of a Newspaper. Mr. Mehta hires Naresh and assigns him to go to a remote island to investigate and expose some illegal activities there. Naresh goes there in the company of his friend, Shyam. Unfortunately, Naresh is caught by the island guards and lodged in a cell along with two others, one a scientist and Ram Singh, a hoodlum. The scientist confides in Naresh that he has invented an atomic ring that when inserted in someone's mouth will turn that person invisible, and subsequently passes away. Naresh puts the ring in his mouth, takes off his clothes, turns invisible and escapes. The news of his escape creates waves in the underworld and the Boss and Mr. Verma join forces to find Naresh, kill him, and keep the ring for themselves. Naresh and Shyam must now find ways to stay alive as well as take the ring to the authorities - that is if the Boss and Mr. Verma let them live long enough.
Ulagam Sutrum Valiban	1973	Tamil	Starring M. G. Ramachandran Ulagam Sutrum Valiban (transl. Globetrotting Youngster) is a 1973 science-fiction action film directed by M. G. Ramachandran.
Hirak Rajar Deshe	1980	Bengali	Written and directed by Satyajit Ray. Starring Tapen Chatterjee, Rabi Ghosh, Soumitra Chatterjee and Utpal Dutt. The film features a tyrannical king (played by Utpal Dutt) who, along with a scientist (played by Santosh Dutta), uses extraordinary gadgets to brainwash people who protest against him.
Shiva Ka Insaaf	1985	Hindi	Superhero film directed by Raj N. Sippy, starring Jackie Shroff, Poonam Dhillon, and Gulshan Grover.
Jaithra Yaathra	1987	Malayalam	Starring Nizhalgal Ravi, Thilakan, Babu Antony in lead roles and directed by Sasi Kumar. The music director is Shyam and lyrics are by Poovachal Khader. It is a film involving a scientist played by Thilakan who invents a locket that makes a man invisible. Using the locket Nizhalgal Ravi the hero takes revenge against Babu Antony the villain.
Mr. India	1987	Hindi	Superhero film written by Salim–Javed and directed by Shekhar Kapur, starring Anil Kapoor, Sridevi, and Amrish Puri.
Nalaya Manithan	1989	Tamil	Set in the 21st century a doctor finds a drug that can give back life to dead upon injecting it to a dead body within 2 hours of death. After testing it on a human subject he discovers that the zombie he created is immortal.
Toofan	1989	Hindi	Superhero film directed by Ketan Desai, starring Amitabh Bachchan, Meenakshi Seshadri. It stars Amitabh Bachchan in a double role as twin brothers. One is the title character Toofan, a superhero who uses his crossbrow as a weapon and the other is a magician named Shyam.
Adhisaya Manithan	1990	Tamil	It is a sequel to blockbuster Nalaya Manithan in which the zombie killed in the end, still lives and hunts human trespassers in an abandoned mansion.
Aditya 369	1991	Telugu	It is the first time travel film made in India. The film explored dystopian and post-apocalyptic themes in a satirical manner. It was a critical and commercial success and is considered a landmark film in the science fiction genre of Indian cinema. The film revolves around a time machine and a diamond robbery.
Laal Paree	1991	Hindi	Film starring Aditya Pancholi, Sohani, Javed Jaffrey and Gulshan Grover. Story is about Shankar, who falls in love with a girl, unaware of that she is a mermaid. Dr Jacob discovers this and tries every possible way to expose her, not knowing that she will encounter danger. It was inspired from 1984 American movie 'Splash'.
Hollywood	2002	Kannada	Hollywood is a 2002 sci-fi Kannada movie directed by Dinesh Babu. It starred Upendra in a triple role as "Surendra," "Upendra" and "US 47" (an android robot) along with the Australian actress Felicity Mason as "Manisha." The movie was dubbed into Telugu the following year retaining the same title.
Patalghar	2003	Bengali	The film is about a gang of criminals was searching for an ancient sleeping machine in old houses directed by Abhijit Chaudhuri.
Funn2shh..	2003	Hindi	A comedy film depicting time travel to the 10th century
Koi... Mil Gaya	2003	Hindi	A Bollywood alien visitation film starring Hrithik Roshan, Rekha and Preity Zinta. The story revolves around a mentally handicapped young boy Rohit Mehra, who comes to meet with an alien into the earth. He gets a supernatural powers from the alien, by which he gradually becomes physically and mentally smart and strong. Even after the alien returns to his world, Rohit gets a power permanently from the alien.
Naani / New	2004	Telugu Tamil	The film is a story about an 8-year-old boy who is turned into a 28-year-old man by a scientist as a part of testing his new discovery on humans.
Rudraksh	2004	Hindi	An action-adventure Hindi-language film based on the Ramayana.
Alag	2006	Hindi	Film starring Akshay Kapoor, Dia Mirza & Arjun Rampal. Tejas has spent his entire life in the basement and as a result of this is extremely sensitive to sunlight. His only experience of other people up until this point has been with his father and the books he provided for him. Tejas starts showing signs of Telekenesis, and is shunned by the other boys in the institute, resulting in the near fatal accident of a security guard and the death of a fellow student. Tejas is also able to wake a lady from a coma-like condition. When he is subsequently harassed by doctors and scientists wishing to perform experiments on him. Tejas is abducted and held in a glass chamber by Dr. Richard Dyer, who wants to control his mind for his own benefit.
Jaane Hoga Kya	2006	Hindi	Film starring Aftab Shivdasani, Bipasha Basu & Paresh Rawal. It is about an ambitious scientist who creates a human clone in his laboratory.
Krrish	2006	Hindi	A superhero sci-fi mash-up, sequel to Koi... Mil Gaya starring Hrithik Roshan, Priyanka Chopra, Rekha and Naseeruddin Shah.
Athisayan	2007	Malayalam	Super hero film directed by Vinayan.
Bharathan Effect	2007	Malayalam	Science fiction thriller about a genius inventor who makes a small gadget fly without fuel using the concept of anti-gravity.
Zabardast	2007	Marathi	The story centers on Pushkar (portrayed by Pushkar Jog), who stumbles upon a magical jacket that fulfills wishes when worn. Determined to impress the girl he loves, he decides to express his feelings by entering a dance competition with her.
Love Story 2050	2008	Hindi	Film by Pammi Baweja.
Dasavathaaram	2008	Tamil	Dasavathaaram is a Tamil science fiction film starring Kamal Haasan in multi-roles. On 20 December 2004, a bio-technology lab in the USA designs a virus (combination of Marburg and Ebola) intended as a bio-weapon. After understanding its potential, the protagonist, one of the scientists involved, refuses to give the vial containing virus away due to fear of misuse. This story deals with Chaos theory and Butterfly effect of the events that took place in 12th century Tamil Nadu leading to 26th Dec 2004 tsunami.
Drona	2008	Hindi	A Fantasy Adventure superhero film directed by Goldie Behl, starring Abhishek Bachchan, Priyanka Chopra, Kay Kay Menon.
Friend	2009	Bengali	A science fiction film about the friendship between a child and a robot.
Aa Dekhen Zara	2009	Hindi	A romantic sci-fi action thriller film starring Neil Nitin Mukesh, who plays a photo journalist, and Bipasha Basu, as a disc jockey. Ray Acharya (Mukesh), a struggling photographer has nothing going for him... until he inherits a very 'special' camera from his grandfather who was a scientist, as the photographs produced by the camera predict the future.
Enthiran	2010	Tamil	Enthiran is a 2010 Indian Tamil science fiction action film co-written and directed by Shankar. The film features Rajinikanth in dual roles, as a scientist and an andro-humanoid robot alongside Aishwarya Rai. It was India's most expensive film at the time of its release.
Prince	2010	Hindi	It is a science-fiction film action film directed by Kookie V Gulati, produced by Kumar S Taurani and Ramesh S Taurani and Starring Vivek Oberoi and Aruna Shields in the lead roles.
Action Replayy	2010	Hindi	A film inspired from Back to the Future, a 1985 time travel film
7 Aum Arivu	2011	Tamil	A science-fiction thriller film starring Suriya, Shruti Hassan, Johnny Tri Nguyen, produced by Udhayanidhi Stalin and directed by A.R. Murugadoss. The film begins with the fictional life of Bodhidharma (5th century), a master of martial arts and medical remedies, who is depicted in the film as the son of a great Tamil king of the Pallava Dynasty. In the present, Subha Srinivasan (Shruti Haasan), a Genetic Engineering student researches that Bodhidharma can be brought back to present life if his sample of DNA is matched with another sample of DNA which she finds in Aravind (Suriya) a descendant of Bodhidharma. Dong Lee (Johnny Tri Nguyen) is given the task of starting a government planned biological war against India, known as Operation Red to spread disease in India.
Ra.One	2011	Hindi	Superhero film starring Shahrukh Khan, Kareena Kapoor, Arjun Rampal and many others. The film is about an antagonistic game character, Ra.One (played by Tom Wu and Arjun Rampal) which escapes the confines of the game into reality killing everyone (including the game designer played by Shahrukh Khan). He aims to kill the game designer's son (played by Armaan Verma) for beating him inside the game during the game launch. In order to stop him, the game's protagonist G.One (also played by Shahrukh Khan) must be brought out who must save the kidnapped kid and his mother before facing off with Ra.One.
Sonchidi	2011	Hindi	About two friends looking a flying-craft, believed to release from the cycle of births.
Ambuli	2012	Tamil	Ambuli is a 2012 Tamil mystery science-fiction thriller film set in the 1970s. It is about a beastly creature created as a part of a program by a British doctor which hunts humans passing the fields around facility.
Joker	2012	Hindi	A man goes to a forgotten village while is working on a top secret project for creating a device to communicate with aliens.
Virus Diwan	2013	Hindi	This film is about the youngest and the most Intelligent hacker in the world starring Arjun Kapoor.
Zapatlela 2	2013	Marathi	This is a sci-fi film and a sequel to Zapatlela, revolving around a doll possessing the soul of Tatya Vinchu.
Khasi Katha– A Goat Saga	2013	Bengali	The film begins with a scene where a butcher is going to slaughter a goat. The goat becomes talkative and pleads with the butcher for life and promises to tell a story in return. The butcher is surprised but agrees. The goat now tells the butcher the story of a female boxer Salma who belongs to a lower-middle-class family and dreams to become a boxer. Naseeruddin Shah plays the character of butcher and Anindita Bose plays the character of woman boxer.
Krrish 3	2013	Hindi	A superhero sci-fi movie, sequel to Krrish. The story follows the life of Rohit Mehra, a scientist, and Krishna "Krrish" Mehra, his superhero son, who have to face an elaborate conspiracy orchestrated by the evil genius Kaal and his female henchman Kaya. In the process, Krishna's pregnant wife Priya is kidnapped by Kaal and the form-changing Kaya takes her place at the Mehra home and eventually falls in love with Krishna. Krrish 3 released worldwide on 1 November 2013. It has since received positive to mixed reviews from film critics with praise directed to Roshan and Ranaut's performances, the visual effects, and the cinematography; criticism has been directed to the music, story and screenplay.
Irandaam Ulagam	2013	Tamil	Irandaam Ulagam is a Sci-fi fantasy film about two stories unfolding in two different planets, Earth and an exoplanet involving alien life forms.
Red Rain	2013	Malayalam	This is a science fiction film which stars Narain and focuses on Red Rain phenomena, UFO sightseeing and Aliens.
Shree	2013	Hindi	Time-travel film starring Hussain Kuwajerwala.
Creature 3D	2014	Hindi	India's First 3D Monster sci fi Movie starring Bipasha Basu and Pakistani actor Imran Abbas Naqvi in lead role
Appuchi Gramam	2014	Tamil	A science fiction drama directed by Vi Anand an associate of AR Murgadoss, set in a rustic village. The film deals with immense depth of the relationships among humans, when they are made to understand that an asteroid is hitting their village.
PK	2014	Hindi	A satirical comedy drama film. The film was directed by Rajkumar Hirani, produced by Hirani and Vidhu Vinod Chopra, and written by Hirani and Abhijat Joshi. The film deals with a humanoid alien (Aamir Khan) looking for a remote of his space-ship on earth.
I	2015	Tamil	A 2015 Indian Tamil action thriller film written and directed by Shankar and co-written by Subha. Produced and distributed by V. Ravichandran under his production company, Aascar Films, the film features Vikram and Amy Jackson in lead roles while Suresh Gopi, Upen Patel, Santhanam and Ramkumar Ganesan portray pivotal roles. The soundtrack and film score were composed by A. R. Rahman. Production design was handled by T. Muthuraj. P. C. Sreeram was the film's cinematographer and editing was done by Anthony.
Mr. X	2015	Hindi	A science fiction action-thriller film, tells the story of a man became invisible through an experiment.
Indru Netru Naalai	2015	Tamil	Starring Vishnu Vishal, Miya, Karunakaran in lead roles and directed by newcomer Ravi Kumar.R. The music director is Hiphop Tamizha and lyrics are by Vivek, Muthamil and Hiphop Tamizha. It is a film involving a scientist played by Arya who invents a Time Machine and sends it back to the past that enables one to time travel.
Phuntroo	2016	Marathi	An Indian sci-fi film Starring Ketaki Mategaonkar, Madan Deodhar in lead roles and directed by Sujay Dhahake The music director Hrishikesh-Saurabh-Jasraj. Vira is a mad genius who is deeply love struck on Anaya. Faced with utter rejection from the love of his life, he creates a breakthrough invention that will cure his loneliness.
Miruthan	2016	Tamil	An Indian Tamil-language science fiction Zombie Thriller film, written and directed by Shakti Soundar Rajan. The film stars Jayam Ravi and Lakshmi menon. This film, became the first Indian Tamil language film in the zombie genre.It was released on 19 February 2016. Miruthan received appreciation for its experimentation in the Horror(Zombie) genre and participated in various international film festivals.
24	2016	Tamil	An is an Indian Tamil-language science fiction action film, written and directed by Vikram Kumar .The film stars Suriya, Samantha Ruth Prabhu and Nithya Menen. Actor Suriya had played triple roles in this film. One as a scientist( Dr. Sethuraman) and other as his twin brother (Aathreya) and Mani. Its story is based on a watch named '24' which is actually a time travel equipment and it leads to a bitter battle between the twin brothers.
Iru Mugan	2016	Tamil	Iru Mugan is a Tamil science fiction action film, written and directed by Anand Shankar.
A Flying Jatt	2016	Hindi	It is a superhero action film co-written and directed by Remo D'Souza. The story revolves around a boy, who got superpowers from nature, and will fight against the super-villain Raka (who also got superpowers from pollution).
Carbon: The Story Of Tomorrow	2017	Hindi	A Hindi science fiction short film on global warming, written and directed by Maitrey Bajpai and Ramiz Ilham Khan. The movie stars Jackky Bhagnani, Nawazuddin Siddiqui and Prachi Desai in the lead roles.
Srivalli	2017	Telugu	A Telugu science-fiction thriller film written and directed by V. Vijayendra Prasad. The film stars Neha Hinge and Rajath Krishna in the lead roles. The film is about a neuroscientist Srivalli who does an experiment about brainwave simulation and loses track of the past, present and future, unable to recognize the difference between simulation and reality, which leads to unexplainable results.
Anukul	2017	Hindi	A a 2017 Hindi short film directed by Sujoy Ghosh with Parambrata Chatterjee and Saurabh Shukla playing the lead roles. The film is based on the master storyteller Satyajit Ray's short story of same name.
Maayavan	2017	Tamil	A Tamil science fiction mystery thriller film, written and directed by C. V. Kumar. This film deals with the concept of transferring the brain's memory into different persons so that it may lead the person to live even more than 1000 years.
Okka Kshanam	2017	Telugu	The film directed by Vi Anand is based on the concept of parallel life where the protagonist fights against his own destiny, fate and time.
2.0	2018	Tamil	An Indian Tamil science fiction film a sequel to Enthiran, written and directed by S. Shankar and starring Rajinikanth, Akshay Kumar and Amy Jackson. Considered one of the most expensive films of all time in India.
Professor Shonku O El Dorado	2018	Bengali	Produced by SVF Entertainment and directed by Sandip Ray.
Jole Jongole	2018	Bengali	The film stars Mithun Chakraborty as a 'mad' scientist who wants to bring back prehistoric creatures, perished millions of years ago from the earth as he is trying to expand the brain of crocodiles. Jackie Shroff stars as the antagonist who wants to take control of dangerous crocodiles for his own park.
Vinveli Payana Kurippugal	2018	Tamil	An Indian Tamil Non-Linear science fiction black comedy film.
Who	2018	Malayalam	A mystery sci-fi film which follows a group investigators in a small-town Indian valley trying to solve mysterious disappearances involving time-travel.
Short Circuit	2019	Gujarati	The first Gujarati science fiction film, written and directed by Faisal Hashmi. The film revolves around a guy named Samay, who is stuck in a timeloop because of a failed experiment. He has to save his love and the world before it's too late.
9	2019	Malayalam	Nine is a Malayalam sci-fi, horror thriller movie directed by Jenuse Mohammed.It stars Prithviraj Sukumaran and Master Alok in the lead roles. A global crisis arises when a comet passes very close to the Earth for 9 days. Even though it causes no harm to humans, it causes other problems.All electrical appliances, mobile phones and most vehicles stop working. To make a feature on this Astrophysicist Albert Lewis go to The Himalayalas with his son Adam.The story then focuses on the relationship between the father and the son and the things they experience there.
Unmatta	2019	Marathi	Unmatta is scifi, horror, action film. Unmatta is touted to be the best of sci-fi till date coming out from the Indian subcontinent. There seems to be heavy investment in VFx and action (Martial Arts) from production house. Movie is in post production and release will be on 22 Feb 2019.
ISmart Shankar	2019	Telugu	The film directed by Puri Jagannadh. It is a sci-fi action film, in which a contract killer who helps the police when a slain police officer's memories are transferred to his brain.
Android Kunjappan Version 5.25	2019	Malayalam	Android Kunjappan Version 5.25 is Malayalam-language sci-fi comedy-drama film written and directed by Ratheesh Balakrishnan Poduval (in his directorial debut starring Suraj Venjaramoodu, Soubin Shahir, Kendy Zirdo, and Saiju Kurup. It is a story about Bhaskara Poduval, a conservative villager, who hates the idea of his son relocating to Russia for a job. However, when his son brings a robot to care for him, he develops an unlikely bond with the machine
Professor Shonku O El Dorado	2019	Bengali	This is an adventure story of the fictional genius scientist and inventor Professor Shonku visiting the heart of the Amazon forests in search of the mythical city of El Dorado.
Disco Raja	2020	Telugu	It is a sci-fi action film directed by Vi Anand. It is a story about a new scientific discovery used by a group of scientists to reanimate a murdered man with a violent past.
Bombhaat	2020	Telugu	It is a science fiction film directed by Raghavendra Varma. The film stars Sai Sushanth Reddy, Chandini Chowdary, and Simran Choudhary. The film was released on Amazon Prime Video on 3 December 2020.
Trip	2021	Tamil	Trip is a 2021 Indian Tamil-language science fiction film written and directed by Dennis Manjunath. The film stars Yogi Babu, Karunakaran and Sunainaa in the lead roles. The film is loosely inspired from Hollywood films Tucker & Dale vs. Evil and Wrong Turn. The film had its theatrical release on 5 February 2021.
Play Back	2021	Telugu	It is a 2021 Indian Telugu-language science fiction drama film written and directed by Hari Prasad Jakka. The film stars Dinesh Tej, Ananya Nagalla, Arjun Kalyan, and Spandana. Play Back is marketed as the first Indian film based on cross time connection. The plot follows Karthik (Tej) and Sujatha (Nagalla), two people from different time periods who connect together through a phone call. The film was released on 5 March 2021.
Teddy	2021	Tamil	Teddy is a 2021 Indian Tamil-language fantasy action film written and directed by Shakti Soundar Rajan. The film stars a teddy bear in the titular role as a special character, while Arya along with Sayyeshaa feature in the lead roles. Sathish, Karunakaran, and Magizh Thirumeni play supporting roles in the film. The music is composed by D. Imman and the film is produced by K. E. Gnanavel Raja under his production banner Studio Green. It is the first Tamil film to use an Indian animation company to design a special animated character and the second motion-capture film in Tamil after Kochadaiiyaan (2014). It was released worldwide on Hotstar on 12 March 2021. The movie is inspired by the Hollywood film, Ted.
Dikkiloona	2021	Tamil	It is a Tamil-language science fiction comedy film written and directed by Karthik Yogi. Mani (Santhanam), an ex-hockey player leads a stressful married life, and works as a lineman for the electricity board. While trying to solve an issue, he meets a group of scientists who are developing a time machine. He uses it to travel back to 2020 and change the root cause of all his problems.
Bony	2021	Bengali	The story of the film revolves around a Bengali couple, settled in Milan. Their newborn son has some special powers. An American-born Bangladeshi on the run scientist, framed by the government with suspected links to terrorism is looking for the couple and their newborn. He thinks they have answers to his questions.
Adbhutham	2021	Telugu	Adbhutham is a Telugu-language science-fiction romance film directed by Mallik Ram from the screenplay of Lakshmi Bhupala and Prasanth Varma. The film stars Teja Sajja and Shivani Rajashekar. It premiered on Disney+ Hotstar on November 19, 2021.
Maanaadu	2021	Tamil	It is a 2021 Indian Tamil-language time loop action thriller film written and directed by Venkat Prabhu and produced by Suresh Kamatchi. The film stars Silambarasan, S. J. Suryah and Kalyani Priyadarshan alongside S. A. Chandrasekhar, Y. G. Mahendran, Karunakaran, Premgi Amaren, Aravind Akash and Anjena Kirti in supporting roles. The film's music and score is composed by Yuvan Shankar Raja, with cinematography handled by Richard M. Nathan.
Jango	2021	Tamil	It is a 2021 Indian Tamil-language time loop science fiction
Attack: Part 1	2022	Hindi	Indian Hindi-language science fiction action thriller film directed and co-written by Lakshya Raj Anand.The film produced by Jayantilal Gada, John Abraham and Ajay Kapoor, stars John Abraham alongside Jacqueline Fernandez and Rakul Preet Singh. Based on hostage crisis, the storyline is inspired by true events.
Stabiliti	2022	Kannada	Stabiliti is a Kannada science-fiction crime thriller film which revolves around a R&AW agent who tackles a terrorist who wreaks havoc across India. Stabiliti is rated 8.7/10 on IMDb and has won 9 awards for Best Screenplay in international film festivals. The cast include Kashyap Bhaskar, Lakshmi Ambuga, Sandeep T C, Srinidhi Talak, Divya Bajpai, S N Sethuram and Santosh Karki. The film was written, produced and directed by Goutham Kanade under WinterSun Studios banner.
Oke Oka Jeevitham	2022	Telugu	Oke Oka Jeevitham is a 2022 Telugu-language science fiction drama film written and directed by debutant Shree Karthick and produced by Dream Warrior Pictures. The film stars Sharwanand, Amala Akkineni and Ritu Varma.
Captain	2022	Tamil	Captain is an Indian Tamil-language science fiction film directed by Shakti Soundar Rajan, and produced by Arya through his studio The Show People, associating with Think Studios and SNS Movie Production LLP. It stars Arya, Aishwarya Lekshmi, Simran in the lead roles. The film's music and score is composed by D. Imman, with cinematography handled by S. Yuva and editing done by Pradeep E. Ragav. It is inspired from John McTiernan's film Predator. The movie is based on alien invasion in the North-Eastern Border of India, where the Characters try to evade the aliens
Gajab Thai Gayo!	2022	Gujarati	A science fiction adventure comedy. The first Gujarati science fiction film.
Mark Antony	2023	Tamil	In the film, Mark, the son of a gangster Antony, finds a telephone which can contact the past, but Madhan, the son of rival gangster Jackie, wants it for himself.
Ayalaan	2024	Tamil	Ayalaan is an Indian Tamil-language science fiction comedy film directed by R. Ravikumar, and produced by Kotapadi J. Rajesh under KJR Studios. It stars Sivakarthikeyan, Rakul Preet Singh, Sharad Kelkar, and Isha Koppikar in the lead roles. The music composed by A. R. Rahman, and cinematography handled by Nirav Shah, and editing by Ruben.
Teri Baaton Mein Aisa Uljha Jiya	2024	Hindi	Teri Baaton Mein Aisa Uljha Jiya is an Indian Hindi-language science fiction romantic comedy film written and directed by Amit Joshi and Aradhana Sah, in their directorial debuts. Produced by Maddock Films and Jio Studios, the film stars Shahid Kapoor and Kriti Sanon.
The Greatest of All Time	2024	Tamil	About a mad scientist making a human clones.
Kalki 2898 AD	2024	Telugu	Directed by Nag Ashwin and a Vyjayanti Movies production, starring Prabhas. The film blends the Mahabharata and sci-fi.
Bade Miyan Chote Miyan	2024	Hindi	About an Evil scientist making dozens of human clones for army personnels.
Blink	2024	Kannada	A man with unique ability to control his blinking becomes a curse when a mysterious old man reveals his father's survival.
Black	2024	Tamil	Written & Directed by KG Balasubramani as an adaptation of Coherence. Story revolves around a couple unknowingly passing through a pitch-black area (Wormhole as depicted in the movie) that connects parallel timelines meeting other versions of themselves.
Boomerang	2024	Bengali	Scientist Samar Sen, inventor of the "Flying Bike" and "Virtual Mobile" is a scientist of high intellect and mettle. Despite repeated failures, he dreamt of making a humanoid robot. Although he was married to Isha, her father tried to fix her marriage again with a groom of his choice because Samar didn't have a stable job. But, riding high on hopes, with meticulous precision he created an andro-humanoid robot "Nisha", very similar to his wife Isha. In the meantime, Nisha decides to take a break from Samar and he on the other hand, fell prey to Chinese goons, who were in the intention of stealing Isha from Samar for various malpractices against the country. When Nisha enters in the main scene, it became a boomerang for him and created confusion and chaos.
Gaganachari	2024	Malayalam	Taking place in the 2040s, an apartment inhabited by three problematic bachelors soon becomes a haven for an extraterrestrial female fugitive. Starring Aju Varghese, Anarkali Marikar, Gokul Suresh, and K.B. Ganesh Kumar.
Kanguva	2024	Tamil	In 2024, Zeta, a young test subject for brain enhancement and superpower experiments, escapes from a Russian biomedical facility near the Indian border. The facility's commander deploys troops to recapture him. Starring Suriya, Disha Patani, and Bobby Deol.

== See also ==
- Cinema of India
- Bengali science fiction
- Indian military fiction
