= Captain (2022 film) =

2022 film by Shakti Soundar Rajan

- Theatrical release poster
- Directed by: Shakti Soundar Rajan
- Written by: Shakti Soundar Rajan
- Based on: Predator by John McTiernan
- Produced by: Arya; T. Kishore; Venkataswaroop Siddavarapu Reddy; Shilpa Gaddam Reddy
- Starring: Arya; Aishwarya Lekshmi; Simran; Gokul Anand
- Cinematography: S. Yuva
- Edited by: Pradeep E. Ragav
- Music by: D. Imman
- Production companies: The Show People; Think Studios; SNS Movie Production LLP
- Distributed by: Red Giant Movies
- Release date: 8 September 2022
- Running time: 110 minutes
- Country: India
- Language: Tamil

Captain is a 2022 Indian Tamil-language science fiction monster thriller film written and directed by Shakti Soundar Rajan and produced by The Show People in association with Think Studios and SNS Movie Production LLP. The film stars Arya and Aishwarya Lekshmi in lead roles, with Simran and Gokul Anand playing the antagonist roles. While Harish Uthaman, Bharat Raj, Kavya Shetty, Gokulnath, Malavika Avinash and Adithya Menon plays other pivotal roles. The music is composed by D. Imman, with cinematography by S. Yuva and editing by Pradeep E. Ragav. It is the remake of John McTiernan's film Predator.

The film was scheduled to be released in theatres on 8 September 2022. It received mixed-to-negative reviews from critics and audiences, with praise for Arya's performance, cinematography and music, but criticism of its VFX, script and direction.

== Plot ==
Vetriselvan, an Indian Army Captain is an orphan who is raised in the army school. His only family is his team comprising Karuna, Sheikh, Rekha, and Karthi Devan. The team is famous for its unity and covert missions. They are assigned a task to investigate a particular area in the forest, Sector-42. The area earlier had a mineral factory under East India Company rule. Due to a high amount of unusual activity happening in this area for the past 50 years, nobody has dared to set foot in the area. A team of soldiers sent to the site to investigate never returned. Vetri and his team visit Sector-42, but an unknown creature attacks them, making them unconscious.

After regaining consciousness, Vetri discovers that Karthi is trying to shoot himself and sees that all of his team members are unconscious. When Vetri tells Karthi not to shoot himself, he shoots him in the shoulder and dies. This incident becomes a black mark on Vetri's character since he refuses to blame Karthi and takes sole blame for the failed operation. Karthi is branded as a traitor and is not given a military funeral which deeply upsets Vetri. Because he refuses to blame Karthi for the operation, Vetri is handed a punishment posting as a training officer. Dr Keerthi is a scientist who is working for the defense ministry on the Minotaur project. The unnamed creature which is present in Sector-42 is called "Minotaur", an extremely dangerous cold-blooded creature that doesn't have any body temperature. It spits venom on people to make them unconscious, and some people go berserk after making eye contact with a Minotaur.

Minotaurs communicate with each other by emitting bio-radio signals with the help of spiders. Keerthi, with the help of Vikram, the spoiled son of a prominent pharmaceutical mogul, establishes a lab just near Sector-42 to study the behaviour of Minotaurs and their threat. Since Vetri's team was the last one to visit Sector-42, they are chosen by Dr Keerthi for the mission despite reservations from General Bala who despises Vetri after he refuses to take Karthi's blame for the earlier operation. The mission commences, and the Minotaurs manage to attack everyone except Vetri, who is conscious. Vetri almost kills a Minotaur with a bomb and brings it into the lab. Since the Minotaur is unconscious and not dead, it still sends the signal to the spider and is awakened.

The Minotaur almost destroys the lab and kills a soldier who becomes berserk after coming into contact with the Minotaur. Realising that Minotaurs attack in open spaces and emit bio-radio signals through spiders, the team and Keerthi travel in an army tank next day. Since there are multiple Minotaurs, Vetri and Keerthi deduce that a huge Minotaur is present and emitting signals to the smaller ones. They install devices around the forest to establish the location of the huge Minotaur but, just as they are close to the location, they are all blinded by one of the Minotaurs except for Vetri, who is conscious. Keerthi finds that Minotaurs are sensitive to morphine from a blood sample she retrieved from Vetri. After noticing suspicious activity, Vetri finally reveals to his team that they will kill the huge Minotaur in the wee hours of the morning without Keerthi.

The team is shocked that Vetri said they didn't find the location of the giant Minotaur, but he says that they know it and do not remember because of the Minotaur attack. Vetri reveals that they had found the place in a water body near the old factory. After visiting the factory, Vetri sees a lot of corpses and Vikram and Keerthi's company's helicopter on the premises. He holds Keerthi at gunpoint, and she reveals that they wanted to open Sector-42 to extract rare minerals which are not available in anywhere else. A team sent by their company entered Sector-42 without permission to restore the factory. The Minotaurs killed all the people working in the factory since, during restoration, they released polluted water into the streams, which awakened the Minotaurs who felt threatened. Vetri also reveals that Karthi had consumed morphine since he was injured during a past mission.

In their first mission at Sector-42, Karthi saved all of his teammates' lives including Vetri's from Minotaurs but couldn't save his own since he was in close contact with them. The team then proceeds to kill the giant Minotaur without Keerthi. During the search at the factory, Vetri finds a mobile phone in which a scientist recorded vlogs of all the happenings in the factory. He sends that as confidential evidence to General Bala, who then knows about the ulterior motives of Keerthi and Vikram and also learns why Vetri did not blame Karthi for the failed operation. Vetri and his team reach the location of the giant Minotaur, where they initially trick Keerthi, General Bala and Vikram into believing that Vetri has become berserk and has killed his teammates, but they all use rubber bullets.

Vetri is then attacked by the huge Minotaur, through which he learns that the Minotaur's next generation is being safeguarded. After almost drowning to death, Vetri kills the huge Minotaur and finishes the operation. Although the Minotaurs are killed, Keerthi and Vikram's motive is foiled by Vetri and General Bala when they lie about not killing the Minotaur. Since Sector-42 is a dangerous area, the army orders it completely shut down, with civilian activity prohibited. Vetri is reinstated in the field, and Karthi is given a funeral with full honors. Vetri finally learns that his love interest Kavya is Karthi's sister and falls in love with him since Karthi promised his family in a letter that he would present and talk to his family only after his name was cleared.

In the post-credits scene, a seemingly new race of Minotaurs are awakening underwater, emitting bio-radio signals to imply that they will return.

== Cast ==
- Arya as Captain Vetriselvan
- Aishwarya Lekshmi as Kavya, Vetriselvan's love interest and Karthi's sister (Voice dubbed by Chinmayi)
- Simran as Dr. Keerthi
- Gokul Anand as Vikram, Keerthi's partner
- Kavya Shetty as Rekha, Vetri's teammate
- Harish Uthaman as Karthi, Vetri's teammate and Kavya's brother
- Bharath Raj as Sheikh, Vetri's teammate
- Gokulnath as Karuna, Vetri's teammate
- Malavika Avinash as Major Kavitha Nair
- Vincent Asokan as Major Krishnamoorthy
- Adithya Menon as General Bala
- Suresh Chandra Menon as Defence Minister S. Rajiv Chakravarthy
- Rajmohan as Scientist

== Production ==
The film was tentatively titled Arya33. On 18 November 2021, the official title was unveiled as Captain with Shakti Sounder Rajan as the director, marking his second collaboration with Arya after Teddy. Aishwarya Lekshmi was cast as the female lead opposite Arya while Simran, Gokul Anand, Harish Uthaman, Kavya Shetty and Gokul Anand were signed to play other pivotal roles.

Principal photography began on 25 October 2021 and wrapped up on 13 February 2022.

== Music ==
Captain

Soundtrack album by D. Imman
- Released: 29 August 2022
- Recorded: 2022
- Studios: D. Imman Sound Factory, Chennai
- Genre: Feature film soundtrack
- Language: Tamil
- Label: Think Music India

D. Imman chronology
Poikkal Kudhirai (2022)	Captain (2022)	Kaari (2022)

Singles from Captain
- 1. "Ninaivugal" Released: 25 July 2022; 2. "Kylaa" Released: 11 August 2022; 3. "Akkrinai Naan" Released: 26 August 2022; 4. "You Are A Fighter" Released: 5 September 2022

D. Imman composed the soundtrack and background score of the film while collaborating with Arya for the third time after Vasuvum Saravananum Onna Padichavanga and Teddy and Director Shakti Soundar Rajan for the fourth time after Miruthan, Tik Tik Tik and Teddy. On 10 June 2022, music director and singer Yuvan Shankar Raja announced that he would be singing for one of the songs in the film. The aforementioned track was titled "Ninaivugal" that was released as a single on 25 July 2022. The second single "Kylaa" was released on 11 August 2022. The third single "Akkrinai Naan" was released on 26 August 2022. The last single "You Are A Fighter" was released on 5 September 2022. The entire soundtrack album was released on 7 September 2022.

No.	Title	Lyrics	Singer(s)	Length
1.	"Ninaivugal"	Madhan Karky	Yuvan Shankar Raja	4:44
2.	"Kylaa"	Madhan Karky	Shreya Ghoshal, Yazin Nizar	4:28
3.	"Akkrinai Naan"	Arivu	Arivu, Joewin Shamalina	3:55
4.	"You Are A Fighter"	Madhan Karky	Nikhita Gandhi, Christopher Stanley	4:10
5.	"Captain Strike"	-	-	1:27
6.	"Sector 42"	-	-	1:00
7.	"Friends Forever"	-	-	3:14
8.	"Minotaur"	-	-	1:38
9.	"The King Has Come"	-	-	1:57
10.	"Gen Next"	-	-	1:59
11.	"Hear The Roar"	-	-	1:22

== Release ==
=== Theatrical ===
The film was released in theatres on 8 September 2022. The distribution rights of the film in Tamil Nadu were acquired by Udhayanidhi Stalin under the banner of Red Giant Movies.

=== Home media ===
The post-theatrical streaming and satellite rights of the film belong to ZEE5 and Zee Tamil. The film was digitally streamed on ZEE5 on 30 September 2022.

== Reception ==
=== Critical reception ===
Captain mainly received negative reviews from critics. M. Suganth of The Times of India gave the film 2 stars out of 5 and said: "The same can be said of the film, too - an underwhelming, underwritten action movie."

Janani K of India Today rated the film 2 out of 5 stars and wrote: "Captain is an underwritten film which needed much more substance and attention to detail to capture the audience."

Kirubhakar Purushothaman of The Indian Express rated the film 2 out of 5 stars and wrote: "Captain is not as excruciating as director Shakti Soundar Rajan’s previous ventures like Miruthan or Tik Tik Tik, but those are just poor yardsticks to measure films."

Siby Jeyya of the India Herald said: "Crisp, potent music and sound really add to the experience. Although the acting is little, it is necessary for the tale in terms of context."

Sowmya Rajendran of The News Minute gave the film's rating 1.5 out of 5 stars and wrote: "The film is just under two hours long, but it feels like an age by the time it comes to an end."
