= Ayalaan =

2024 Indian film by R. Ravikumar

- Theatrical release poster
- Directed by: R. Ravikumar
- Written by: R. Ravikumar; Karundhel Rajesh; Rajan Rajamandhalan
- Produced by: Kotapadi J Rajesh
- Starring: Sivakarthikeyan; Rakul Preet Singh; Siddharth; Sharad Kelkar; Isha Koppikar
- Cinematography: Nirav Shah
- Edited by: Ruben
- Music by: A. R. Rahman
- Production companies: KJR Studios; Phantom FX Studios
- Distributed by: KJR Studios
- Release date: 12 January 2024
- Running time: 155 minutes
- Country: India
- Language: Tamil

Ayalaan (/əjəlɑːn/ transl. Alien) is a 2024 Indian Tamil-language science fiction action comedy film directed by R. Ravikumar and produced by KJR Studios. The film stars Sivakarthikeyan and Rakul Preet Singh in the lead roles, alongside Sharad Kelkar, Isha Koppikar, Karunakaran, Yogi Babu, David Broughton-Davies, Bhanupriya and Bala Saravanan, with Siddharth voicing the titular role. It follows a man who teams up with an alien to stop a rogue scientist from making a deadly Nova gas which would endanger the Earth.

The film was announced by 24AM Studios in October 2016, but the studio backed out before KJR Studios took over, and principal photography commenced in June 2018. The film was predominantly shot in Chennai, and wrapped by early-January 2021 after delays due to financial issues, work conflicts and the COVID-19 pandemic, while additional photography took place in November 2022. The film has music composed by A. R. Rahman, cinematography by Nirav Shah and editing by Ruben.

Ayalaan was released theatrically on 12 January 2024, during the week of Pongal, and received mixed reviews from critics and a huge flop at the box office. A sequel was announced shortly after its release.

== Plot ==
Tamizh, a happy-go-lucky man from Poombarai, is very concerned about taking care of nature. His mother sends him to Chennai to get another job. There, he befriends Sugirtharaja who is the head of a surprise party agency and joins the agency. He soon falls in love Tara, a young woman after being misinformed by Sugirtharaja.

At a function, Tamizh meets Tattoo, an alien sent to Earth by his leaders to retrieve Sparc, a mysterious element, before humans misuse it. Although initially scared, they form a bond and he introduces Tattoo to his friends.

Meanwhile, a ruthless scientist named Aryan is shown to be hunting for Sparc after losing possession of it. Tamizh and Tattoo retrieve Sparc from a girl who found it. Aryan tracks them down but to no avail. However, Aryan has Tattoo's spaceship after finding it in the beginning of the film after an encounter with Tattoo.

Tattoo decides to return to his planet. Tamizh decides to help him get his spaceship. However, as Tattoo leaves, Tamizh is stabbed by Eliza, Aryan's assistant. Tattoo sees this and returns to save Tamizh with his powers, causing Tamizh to have the same powers. Eliza knocks Tattoo out and kidnaps him and gets Sparc. Tamizh and his friends are unaware of this as Tamizh thought Tattoo had left.

== Cast ==
Adapted from the closing credits:

- Sivakarthikeyan as Tamizh (Note: Erroneously listed in the credits as "Shiva".)
- Rakul Preet Singh as Tara
- Siddharth as the voice of Tattoo
  - Venkatesh Senguttuvan portrays the character via motion capture
- Sharad Kelkar as Aryan
- Isha Koppikar as Eliza (Note: Despite the character being unnamed in the narrative, the actress revealed her name is Eliza before the film's release.)
- Karunakaran as Sugirtharaja
- Yogi Babu as Tyson
- Kothandam as Tamizh's mute roommate
- Bala Saravanan as Tamizh's friend (Note: Despite being unnamed in the narrative, he is listed in the credits as "Bala".)
- Bhanupriya as Tamizh's mother
- David Broughton-Davies as Dexter Williams
- Rahul Madhav as Aryan's henchman
- Ujjwal Chopra as a scientist at Aryan Industries
- Alice as the cancer affected girl
- Semmalar Annam as the cancer affected girl's mother
- Sijoy Varghese as Arjun (Note: Despite being called "Arjun", he is listed in the credits as "Honest investor".)
- George Maryan as the fake money lender
- Munishkanth as the police inspector

R. Ravikumar and Darshan, uncredited, appear in the song "Ayalaa Ayalaa" as train passengers.

== Production ==
=== Development ===
24AM Studios, the production company founded by R. D. Raja, former manager of Sivakarthikeyan had produced three films starring the latter—Remo (2016), Velaikkaran (2017) and Seemaraja (2018). On 16 October 2016, the company announced their fourth project with Sivakarthikeyan, that would be directed by R. Ravikumar, in his second directorial after Indru Netru Naalai (2015). Describing it as an ambitious project, Sivakarthikeyan said that the film would be made on a bigger scale, which allows more time for pre-production works before the film goes on floors. Ravikumar then fine-tuned the script, while Sivakarthikeyan went on star in Velaikkaran and Seemaraja.

In December 2017, prior to the release of Velaikkaran, Sivakarthikeyan reiterated on Ravikumar's project with the script being drafted and also clarified that the production team planning to collaborate with top technicians for the project, which would begin after his commitments on Seemaraja. On 15 January 2018, the film was officially announced by 24AM Studios under the tentative title, SK14 (referring to the actor's 14th film) and A. R. Rahman was brought on board to compose music for the film. The following month, Nirav Shah joined the film as the cinematographer; further technicians were announced with editor Leo John Paul, art director T. Muthuraj, stunt choreographer duo Anbariv, costume designer Pallavi Singh being brought on board. John Paul was later replaced by Ruben.

In mid-July 2019, Raja and 24AM Studios decided to back out producing the film due to financial constraints and Sivakarthikeyan himself decided to produce it under his own banner Sivakarthikeyan Productions. However, when the project was revived in November, KJR Studios had decided to cash in the shares of Raja's productions including this project. The makers announced the film's title as Ayalaan on 3 February 2020.

=== Casting ===
Rakul Preet Singh was cast as the female lead in February 2018. That April, Yogi Babu and Karunakaran were reported to be a part of the cast. On 27 June 2018, coinciding with the film's launch, Bhanupriya, Kothandam and Bala Saravanan were present at the ceremony, actively confirming their inclusions in the film. In July 2018, Bollywood actress Isha Koppikar was cast, marking her return to Tamil cinema after Narasimha (2001). She described her character Eliza as a femme fatale and assassin, inspired by the Tomb Raider character Lara Croft. In August 2018, Marathi actor Sharad Kelkar was cast as the main antagonist, making his Tamil debut. He described his character as someone who is "hungry for power and new technology". Though Kelkar did not know Tamil, he would fluently communicate with Ravikumar during production as he felt that "cinema doesn't have any language". Welsh actor David Broughton-Davies portrays Dexter Williams, an American Ufologist. He spoke his dialogues in English and they were dubbed in Tamil.

Venkatesh Senguttuvan was cast as the stand-in for the alien, performed through motion capture. He signed the project first even before he went on to debut in Mathimaran (2023), released during the film's delay. Speaking to The New Indian Express, he said he used to wear a blue-coloured suit embedded with multiple sensors to capture his movements, while the facial expressions being captured by another person. It took the film team five takes to shoot each movement with and without him. In November 2023, Vadivelu was considered to voice the alien before Siddharth was finalised by the producers in December 2023. Siddharth charged no fee for his work. Sivakarthikeyan had previously dubbed for Siddharth in Sridhar, the Tamil dubbed version of Oh My Friend (2011).

=== Filming ===
Principal photography began on 27 June 2018, preceded by a launch event in Chennai. Thereafter, the film's team headed to Gokulam Studios for a brief schedule. Nirav Shah used the Alexa LF camera, making Ayalaan the first Indian film to be shot using this camera. Major portions of the film were shot in Chennai and has been shot at regular intervals, which delayed due to Sivakarthikeyan's commitments in other projects. On 18 February 2019, Sivakarthikeyan confirmed that filming had been resumed in Chennai. However, his involvement in the production of Mr. Local, Namma Veettu Pillai and Hero delayed the project further. Adding to these were the financial issues surrounding Raja's production house, 24AM Studios, which led him backing out of the project, and Sivakarthikeyan himself offered to lend financial support for the film before KJR Studios took over.

The project was later revamped on 20 September 2019, after Sivakarthikeyan sorted out the financial issues surrounding between the producers and the financiers. He further decided to forgo his remuneration to complete the film's shoot. Ravikumar too opted against accepting remuneration due to the film's financial troubles. By November, 75% of the shooting had been completed and the remaining portions would be shot within 25–30 days. The shooting resumed on 29 January 2020. On 9 February 2020, a report claimed that the film's team worked for 15 hours to shoot the climax sequence.

Filming was further affected due to the COVID-19 pandemic. In July 2020, the makers reported that Sivakarthikeyan will join the shooting after wrapping his commitments with Doctor (2021). Later, the final schedule was commenced on 26 November 2020, with minimal crew, adhering to the guidelines imposed by the government. A special team was designated, to observe the crew, including the director and the actor abiding to COVID-19 protocols. Koppikar and Kelkar arrived in Chennai, to join the film's shoot, which went on for two months. A song sequence was shot within 10 days in Chennai during January 2021, that featured 600 dancers in background. On 24 January 2021, the makers announced that principal photography has wrapped. The team then returned for additional photography which took place in November 2022.

=== Design ===
Bejoy Arputharaj, the CEO of Phantom FX which handled the film's visual effects and who served as the supervisor worked with Ravikumar on conceptualising the design for the alien character. Ravikumar sketched the initial design of the alien for the past seven years, and wanted it to be a prominent figure appearing throughout the film, as well as portray various emotions and reactions. Ravikumar and Bejoy also ensured that the alien should be liked by children as well. Hence, they showcased the initial designs of the alien character to children for look tests and they finalised the design after their approval.

A puppet resembling the alien was procured from the United States to ensure precision in lighting and details by cinematographer Nirav Shah's team, that costed around ₹2 crores. However, due to the delay in obtaining the model from there, they decided to develop an indigenous puppet resembling the alien by art director Muthuraj, during production. The team then captured the movements of the alien through motion capture performance with Venkatesh as the stand-in, and then combine it using visual effects. During pre-production in 2017, the motion capture technology costed around ₹80 lakhs, they went ahead with a motion capture suit of ₹20 lakhs due to budget constraints. But during the period of delay, they bought an advanced motion capture suit at a low price, while also performing facial capture for the alien which helped them provide a better quality.

=== Post-production ===
The film's post-production involved extended visual effects. In January 2021, it was reported that the makers needed more than 10 months to complete the visual effects, which cost over ₹40 crore (equivalent to ₹49 crore or US$5.2 million in 2026). The team further brought in several technicians from Hollywood for the computer graphics and digital intermediate works. The dubbing for the film began in February 2021.

Besides providing visual effects, Phantom FX also co-produced the film through Phantom FX Studios, which would mark their first production. The film has over 4500 visual effects shots, claimed to be the most for an Indian film to that point. In an interview with Galatta Plus, Sivakarthikeyan attributed the film's delay due to the incomplete post-production works during the pandemic as visual effects could not be done with multiple restrictions. However, the delay helped Ravikumar to use new technologies for the film.

== Music ==
The film's soundtrack and background score are composed by A. R. Rahman, which marks his first collaboration with Sivakarthikeyan and Ravikumar. Sivakarthikeyan described it as a "dream come true" moment, on associating with Rahman for the first time. Rahman agreed to do the picture in late-2017 and eventually began the music sittings and composition in March 2018. Despite the delay in the film's shoot, Rahman had completed composing three songs for the film, apart from singing the intro song, after Sivakarthikeyan's request.

On the occasion of Sivakarthikeyan's birthday 17 February 2021, the film's first single "Vera Level Sago" was released online and in the official YouTube channel of Sony Music South, which acquired the film's audio rights. The second single "Ayalaa Ayalaa" was released on 20 December 2023. The audio launch was held on 26 December 2023. The third single "Suro Suro" was released on 7 January 2024. The remaining songs, with the film's album were released to music streaming platforms on 11 January 2024, a day before the film's release.

== Release ==
=== Theatrical ===
Ayalaan was released theatrically on 12 January 2024, during the week of Pongal and clashing with Captain Miller. and failed at the box office. As of December 2021, the film was facing uncertainty over its release due to 24AM Studios borrowing ₹5 crore (equivalent to ₹6.1 crore or US$650,000 in 2026) from Tag Entertainment, and the Madras High Court granted a stay over its release till 3 January 2022 unless the sum was repaid. On 24 April 2023, it was announced that the film would be released during Diwali in November 2023. Later the film was delayed indefinitely to allow time for the visual effects and CGI work to be completed, before being scheduled for January 2024. The film's Telugu dubbed version was released on 26 January, but was removed from theatres a few days later due to "unsettled deals" with the digital intermediate partner.

=== Home media ===
The film's broadcast rights were sold to Sun TV and the streaming rights to Sun NXT. It began streaming on Sun NXT from 9 February 2024.

== Reception ==
On the review aggregator website Rotten Tomatoes, 33% of 6 critics' reviews are positive, with an average rating of 5/10.

=== Critical response ===
Ayalaan received mixed reviews from critics.

M. Suganth of The Times of India rated 2.5/5 stars and wrote, "It is the twists that Ravikumar gives to concepts that we have seen in several Hollywood films – superpowers, UFOs, extra-terrestrials, powerful robots, femme fatales, large-scale destruction – that makes Ayalaan an entertainer for all ages." Sanjith Sidhardhan of OTTplay rated 2.5/5 and told, "While Ayalaan has a somewhat predictable storyline, the VFX of the film and its fun storytelling aided by appealing characters make this a great festive watch for the families, especially with the children." Janani K of India Today gave 2.5/5 stars and wrote "'Ayalaan' is a fun film for kids and could appeal to them more because of its simplistic approach." Priyanka Sundar of Firstpost rated the film 1.5 stars out of 5.

Kirubhakar Purushothaman of The Indian Express gave 2/5 stars and wrote, "The laughs in this sci-fi comedy are sparse and few, much like the good ideas." Latha Srinivasan of Hindustan Times wrote, "Ayalaan may have been delayed a few years but it will still appeal to adults – and kids – looking for a place to while away some good time." Krishna Selvaseelan of Tamil Guardian awarded the film 2 out of 5 stars, stating, "Targeting a film at children does not excuse the filmmaker from creating a good film – it has been done numerous times before." Vivek M. V. of The Hindu wrote that the film is "light-hearted and has an expressive alien to entertain, but it doesn't push the boundaries enough to offer a gripping sci-fi experience".

=== Accolades ===
At the 2024 VAM Awards, Ayalaan won in the following categories: Best Motion Capture, Best Compositing, Best VFX Feature (Domestic), Best Innovative Use of Software in VFX and Best VFX Supervisor (Bejoy Arputharaj).

== Potential sequel ==
During an interview in December 2023, Sivakarthikeyan hinted that a sequel for the film would begin production soon. On 23 January 2024, the sequel was confirmed by KJR Studios and Phantom FX, with Ravikumar and Sivakarthikeyan returning in their positions.

== See also ==
- Science fiction films in India
- List of science fiction films of the 2020s
