= Varuthapadatha Valibar Sangam (soundtrack) =

Soundtrack album by D. Imman
- Released: 19 July 2013
- Recorded: 2013
- Genre: Feature film soundtrack
- Length: 39:57
- Language: Tamil
- Label: Sony Music
- Producer: D. Imman

D. Imman chronology
Desingu Raja (2013)	Varuthapadatha Valibar Sangam (2013)	Pandiya Naadu (2013)

Varuthapadatha Valibar Sangam is the soundtrack album composed by D. Imman to the 2013 Tamil-language romantic comedy film of the same name directed by Ponram and produced by Escape Artists Motion Pictures starring Sivakarthikeyan, Soori, Sri Divya and Sathyaraj. The album featured nine tracks, all of them featuring lyrics written by Yugabharathi. The album was launched on 19 July 2013 through the Sony Music India label and received positive reviews, with the song "Oodha Colour Ribbon" becoming popular.

== Background ==
The music is composed by D. Imman, previously collaborated with Sivakarthikeyan in Manam Kothi Paravai (2012). Imman began composing the tunes by December 2012 even before the film went into production. The soundtrack album features five songs, with a dubstep version and three karaoke versions, thus making it to nine tracks in total. It featured contributions from Hariharasudhan, Jayamoorthy, Vijay Yesudas, Pooja Vaidyanath, Anthony Daasan, Kovilpatti Amali, Shreya Ghoshal, Sooraj Santhosh, Swetha Suresh, Tha Prophecy. Sivakarthikeyan sung the title track "Varuthapadatha Valibar Sangam", making his debut in playback singing.

== Release ==
The audio launch was held on 19 July 2013 at Sathyam Cinemas, Chennai. The event was felicitated by actor Dhanush and director A. R. Murugadoss.

== Track listing ==
No.	Title	Singer(s)	Length
1.	"Oodha Colour Ribbon"	Hariharasudhan	04:42
2.	"Indha Ponnungale"	Jayamoorthy	04:32
3.	"Paakaathey Paakaathey"	Vijay Yesudas, Pooja Vaidyanath	04:35
4.	"Varuthapadatha Valibar Sangam"	Sivakarthikeyan, Anthony Daasan, Kovilpatti Amali	04:00
5.	"Yennada Yennada"	Shreya Ghoshal, Sooraj Santhosh, Swetha Suresh	04:18
6.	"Indha Ponnungale" (Dubstep mix)	Jayamoorthy, Tha Prophecy	03:41
7.	"Oodha Colour Ribbon" (Karaoke)	—	04:42
8.	"Paakaathey Paakaathey" (Karaoke)	—	04:32
9.	"Indha Ponnungale" (Karaoke)	—	04:31
Total length:			39:57

== Reception ==
=== Critical reception ===
S. R. Ashok Kumar from The Hindu, stated that "VVS songs is surely set to lift your mood." Karthik of Milliblog wrote, "Imman continues his good run, though there is now a clear indication that this style is getting mildly exhausting". Sify considered Imman's music as a highlight, which "blends perfectly with the rural theme of the film"; the review stated besides "Oodha Colour Ribbon" being the "pick of a lot", "Paakathey Paakathey" was considered a "lovely melody". S. Saraswathi of Rediff.com noted that Imman's music "fun and lively" with "Oodha Colour Ribbon" has some "amusing lyrics and is quite addictive".

=== Accolades ===
Award	Date of ceremony	Category	Nominee(s)	Result	Ref.
Filmfare Awards South	61st Filmfare Awards South	Best Music Director – Tamil	D. Imman	Nominated	
South Indian International Movie Awards	3rd South Indian International Movie Awards	Best Music Director	D. Imman	Nominated	
South Indian International Movie Awards	3rd South Indian International Movie Awards	Best Male Playback Singer	Hariharasudan (for "Oodha Color Ribbon")	Nominated	
Vijay Awards	8th Vijay Awards	Best Music Director	D. Imman	Nominated	
Vijay Awards	8th Vijay Awards	Favourite Song	"Oodha Colour Ribbon"	Won	

== Impact ==
Varuthapadatha Valibar Sangam has been considered one of Imman's best albums according to The Times of India. The track "Oodha Colour Ribbon" in particular attained popularity. In September 2020, actor-politician Pawan Kalyan mentioned it as one of his favourite songs. However, in August 2025, music composer James Vasanthan called out the song's title, which refers to a purple-coloured ribbon, as a misnomer since the ribbon appearing onscreen is blue. He criticised the crew for misleading an entire generation with their seeming lack of awareness of the Tamil language.
