= Ayalaan (soundtrack) =

Soundtrack album by A. R. Rahman
- Released: 9 January 2024
- Studios: Panchathan Record Inn and AM Studios, Chennai
- Genre: Film soundtrack
- Length: 19:57
- Language: Tamil
- Label: Sony Music India
- Producer: A. R. Rahman

A. R. Rahman chronology
Pippa (2023)	Ayalaan (2023)	Lal Salaam (2024)

Ayalaan is the soundtrack to the 2024 Tamil-language science fiction film of the same name directed by R. Ravikumar, starring Sivakarthikeyan, Rakul Preet Singh, Sharad Kelkar, and Isha Koppikar. It was produced by KJR Studios and PhantomFX Studios. The film's soundtrack featured five songs composed by A. R. Rahman and lyrics written by Vivek, Madhan Karky, Krithika Nelson, thoughtsfornow, Sivakarthikeyan and Rahman themselves. The soundtrack was released on 9 January 2024 through Sony Music India.

== Development ==
Ayalaan is Rahman's maiden collaboration with Sivakarthikeyan and Ravikumar; the former described it as a "dream come true" moment on working with the composer. Rahman agreed to score the film in late 2017, before his inclusion in January 2018. The music sittings for the film began on March. As per Sivakarthikeyan's request, Rahman had sung the introductory song (later named as "Vera Level Sago") for the film. By November 2019, Rahman had composed three songs for the film despite its delay in production.

== Release ==
The film's music rights were acquired by Sony Music India. On 17 February 2021, coinciding with Sivakarthikeyan's birthday, the first single "Vera Level Sago" was released. Two years later, the second single "Ayalaa Ayalaa" was released on 18 December 2023. The third song "Suro Suro" was released on 7 January 2024. The fourth single "Maanja Nee", a promotional song, was released on 10 January, featuring Sivakarthikeyan, Rahman and Ravikumar.

The film's audio launch event was held at the Taj Coromandel hotel in Nungambakkam, Chennai, with the presence of the cast and crew members. However, the soundtrack was not released on that date. Instead, the album was launched on 10 January 2024, which featured the previously released singles and the fifth song "Chella Rangi".

== Track listing ==
No.	Title	Lyrics	Singer(s)	Length
1.	"Vera Level Sago"	Vivek	A. R. Rahman	4:14
2.	"Ayalaa Ayalaa"	Vivek	A. R. Rahman, Hriday Gattani, Naresh Iyer	4:27
3.	"Maanja Nee"	Sivakarthikeyan, A. R. Rahman, thoughtsfornow	A. R. Rahman, A. R. Ameen	3:54
4.	"Chella Rangi"	Krithika Nelson	Sanjith Hegde, Shashaa Tirupati	3:26
5.	"Suro Suro"	Madhan Karky	Mohit Chauhan, Nakul Abhyankar	3:56

== Reception ==
In a positive note, Shalmesh More of Koimoi called the music as "decent" with the songs "Ayalaa Ayalaa" and "Suro Suro" "going well with the narration." Contrarily, Vishal Menon of Film Companion South called it as "one of his weaker scores". Similarly, M. Suganth of The Times of India described the musical score as "generic", and Akshay Kumar of DT Next called it as "forgettable". Navein Darshan of Cinema Express wrote "the usually dependable Rahman lets the film down with his songs and background score. It is unfortunate that the scenes, which could have potentially made the entire theatre erupt just pass by calmly, without the much-needed support of a rousing BGM."
