= Wahan Ke Log =

1967 film

- Directed by: N. A. Ansari
- Written by: K. B. Pathak
- Produced by: N. A. Ansari
- Starring: Pradeep Kumar; Tanuja
- Music by: C. Ramchandra
- Production company: Bundelkhand Films
- Release date: 1967
- Country: India
- Language: Hindi

Wahan Ke Log (transl. People from Out There) is a 1967 Indian Hindi-language science fiction film. Directed by Nisar Ahmed Ansari, the film stars Pradeep Kumar, Tanuja, Johnny Walker. One of the earliest sci-fi films made in India, it tells the story of a supposed martial threat on India by aliens from outer space intending to rob the rich of their diamonds. Made on a low budget, the film was promoted with the tagline "The strange visitors from Mars are on the way".

== Plot ==
Agent Rakesh is assigned by Chief Sheikh of the Central Intelligence Service to investigate the murder case of Dinanath from Karolbagh, with speculation of a possible involvement of aliens from Mars. Rakesh, who lives with his mother and is to marry Sarita, embarks on a journey to Bombay along with private detective Neelkanth, from Blue Bird Detective Agency.

== Cast ==
- Pradeep Kumar as Rakesh alias Prince Ranveer Singh
- Tanuja as Sarita
- Johnny Walker as Neelkanth
- Shobhna Samarth as Rakesh's Mother
- D. K. Sapru as Shaikh
- Neelofar as Margaret
- Nisar Ahmad Ansari as Professor Anil Chakravarty
- Hari Shukla as Dwarka Prasad
- Bela Bose as Sophia
- Laxmi Chhaya as Dancer
- M. A. Latif as Inspector Latif
- Viju Khote as Spaceship Pilot

== Soundtrack ==
The music was composed by C. Ramchandra. The lyrics were written by Shakeel Badayuni. The songs are as follows:

Song	Singer
"Hum Tujhse Mohabbat Karke Sanam"	Mukesh
"Tum Kitni Khoobsurat Ho"	Mahendra Kapoor
"Woh Pyara Pyara Pyara Pyara Chanda"	Mahendra Kapoor
"Aawaz Meri Sunkar"	Asha Bhosle
"Zindagi Ka Nasha"	Asha Bhosle

== Reception ==
A review carried by Link magazine was critical of the film, writing: "Credibility is not by any means its forte and there is very little in its length to distinguish it from the stock brew that Bombay is known to bottle under various labels". Being one of the only sci-fi pictures from India, the film has been discussed by a number of scholars. According to Sami Ahmad Khan, author of the essay Bollywood's Encounters with the Third Kind, Wahan Ke Log seems to have taken inspiration from the Sino-Indian War which took place five years before, even though no mention of China is made in the film. The Times of India listed the film as one of India's "Super C grade movies", dismissing it as the worst of India's sci-fi films. A retrospective review by The Hindu, however, called it "an unusual film, an interesting blend of a ghost and thieving aliens".
