= Teddy (film) =

2021 film directed by Shakti Soundar Rajan

- Official release poster
- Directed by: Shakti Soundar Rajan
- Written by: Shakti Soundar Rajan
- Produced by: K. E. Gnanavel Raja
- Starring: Arya; Sayyeshaa; Sathish; Karunakaran; Magizh Thirumeni
- Cinematography: S. Yuva
- Edited by: T. Shivanandeeswaran
- Music by: D. Imman
- Production company: Studio Green
- Distributed by: Disney+ Hotstar
- Release date: 12 March 2021
- Running time: 136 minutes
- Country: India
- Language: Tamil

Teddy is a 2021 Indian Tamil-language fantasy action thriller film written and directed by Shakti Soundar Rajan. The film features a teddy bear in the title role, alongside Arya, Sayyeshaa, Sathish, Karunakaran and Magizh Thirumeni. The film's music and background score were composed by D. Imman, and it was produced by K. E. Gnanavel Raja under Studio Green.

Teddy is the first Tamil film to use an Indian animation company to design a special animated character, and the second motion capture-based film in Tamil cinema after Kochadaiiyaan (2014).

The film was released worldwide on 12 March 2021 on Disney+ Hotstar and received mixed reviews from critics.

The basic plotline was later reused in the Telugu film Buddy, with E. B. Gokulan reprising his role.

== Plot ==
Srividya Purushothaman, also known as Sri, is a college student who helps an accident victim and injures her hand in the process. She is admitted to a hospital, where she is secretly administered drugs that induce an artificial coma. When she regains partial consciousness, her soul becomes mysteriously transferred into a teddy bear.

Shivanarayanan, also known as Shiva, is an unemployed graduate with eidetic memory and OCD, which enables him to learn things quickly. His mother Lakshmi and his friend take him to consult Dr. Priya Gopal, a psychiatrist, but the session proves ineffective.

One night, Shiva rescues a teenager from a group of goons. Sri, in the teddy bear, witnesses the incident and later meets him. Initially believing the encounter to be a dream, Shiva eventually realises that the talking teddy bear is real. Sri asks Shiva to help her meet her boyfriend Rishi, but they soon discover that he is untrustworthy, leaving Sri heartbroken.

Shiva and his friend Ramachandran take the teddy bear to Sri's house, where they find her father Purushothaman attempting suicide. Shiva intervenes and saves him. Sri's mother pleads with Shiva to find her missing daughter, and he agrees. Shiva and Sri begin investigating and learn that Sri's unconscious body has been moved from the hospital.

To trace her location, Shiva places the teddy bear inside a parcel using a barcode from the hospital and equips it with a smartphone for tracking. The parcel is shipped to Azerbaijan, where Sri manages to access a stranger's phone and sends a selfie from outside a restaurant to Shiva via Facebook. Determined to rescue her, Shiva sells his belongings and travels to Azerbaijan.

During his journey, Shiva meets Karthik, who has been working there for several years. After reuniting with Sri, Shiva convinces Karthik of the unusual situation, and the three begin searching for Sri's body. Their investigation leads them to a location connected to human trafficking. Sri identifies a distinctive tattoo she had previously seen, which helps them follow a trail of clues.

Shiva uncovers an illegal medical operation led by Dr. Varadarajan, who runs an organ trafficking racket. Victims are deliberately placed in comas so their organs can be harvested and sold to wealthy clients. Realising that Sri was targeted due to her rare blood type, Shiva approaches the authorities.

With the help of the police, the racket is exposed and dismantled. Sri regains consciousness, and her soul returns to her body, leaving the teddy bear lifeless. However, she has no memory of Shiva or his efforts to save her.

Back in India, Sri reunites with her family. A year later, she unknowingly feels drawn to Shiva and begins following him. Eventually, they reconnect and fall in love. They marry and start a new life together. It is later revealed that whenever Sri falls asleep, her soul temporarily returns to the teddy bear.

== Cast ==
- Arya as Shivanarayanan "Shiva"
- Sayyeshaa as Srividya "Sri" Purushothaman
- Nimmi Harshan (voice) and E. B. Gokulan (motion capture) as Teddy
- Sakshi Agarwal as Dr. Priya Gopal (guest appearance)
- Magizh Thirumeni as Dr. Varadarajan
- Sathish as Ramachandran, Shiva's friend
- Karunakaran as Karthik
- Raja Rudrakodi as Rishi, Srividya's ex-boyfriend
- Masoom Shankar as Sarah
- R. N. R. Manohar as M. Purushothaman, Srividya's father
- Mona Bedre as Srividya's mother
- Praveena as Lakshmi, Shiva's mother
- Abdool Lee as Varadarajan's assistant
- Shabeer Kallarakkal as Harish
- Pradeep K. Vijayan as an embassy officer

== Production ==
The film was announced by Shakti Soundar Rajan in March 2019, marking his fifth directorial venture and his maiden collaboration with actor Arya. Principal photography commenced in May 2019. Sakshi Agarwal was cast in a supporting role following her participation in the reality television show Bigg Boss Tamil 3.

Magizh Thirumeni, known for directing Thadam, was cast in a supporting role, marking his acting debut.

The film centres on an animated teddy bear character, which appears for a significant portion of the runtime. Filming took place predominantly in Chennai and at several locations across Europe.

Principal photography was completed in February 2020. In June 2020, Thirumeni stated that the film was planned for a theatrical release, despite reports suggesting a direct release on an OTT platform.

== Soundtrack ==
Teddy

Soundtrack album by D. Imman
- Released: 2020
- Recorded: 2020
- Genre: Film soundtrack
- Language: Tamil
- Label: Think Music India
- Producer: D. Imman

D. Imman chronology
Bhoomi (2021)	Teddy (2020)	Laabam (2021)

The soundtrack album was composed by D. Imman, marking his third collaboration with director Shakti Soundar Rajan after Miruthan (2016) and Tik Tik Tik (2018). All lyrics were written by Madhan Karky.

The first single, En Iniya Thanimaye, sung by Sid Sriram, was released on 14 February 2020, coinciding with Valentine's Day. The video version of the song was released on 1 March 2021.

No.	Title	Singer(s)	Length
1.	"En Iniya Thanimaye"	Sid Sriram	4:48
2.	"Nanbiye"	Anirudh Ravichander	4:51
3.	"Marandhaye"	Pradeep Kumar, Jonita Gandhi	4:59
4.	"Ready Steady Teddy"	Mark Thomas	2:50

== Release ==
Teddy was scheduled to release on 24 April 2020, but was postponed due to the COVID-19 pandemic in India. The film was released worldwide via Disney+ Hotstar on 12 March 2021.

== Reception ==
On the review aggregator website Rotten Tomatoes, 0% of 5 critics' reviews are positive, with an average rating of 4.5/10.

Baradwaj Rangan of Film Companion South wrote, "Tamil cinema's high-concept king, Shakti Soundar Rajan, takes a tumble with this story about a giant talking bear."
