= The Jungle (1952 film) =

1952 film by William A. Berke

- American poster
- Directed by: William Berke
- Produced by: T. R. Sundaram; William Berke
- Starring: Rod Cameron; Cesar Romero; Marie Windsor; M. N. Nambiar
- Cinematography: Clyde De Vinna
- Edited by: L. Balu
- Music by: G. Ramanathan
- Production company: The Modern Theatres Ltd
- Distributed by: Lippert Pictures
- Release date: 1 August 1952
- Running time: 73 min
- Countries: India; United States
- Languages: English; Tamil

The Jungle is a 1952 Indian-American science fiction adventure film directed by William Berke. It stars Rod Cameron, Cesar Romero, Marie Windsor and M.N. Nambiar in lead roles. The film was the first science fiction film in India. The film is predominantly in English while the villagers speak in Tamil. The film was later dubbed in Tamil as Kaadu.

== Plot ==
Princess Sati returns home to India, as regent for her father, at the request of her council of ministers. They inform her that multiple villages have been destroyed by stampeding elephants. Her friend Rama Singh was tasked with stopping the attacks. He hired famous hunter Steve Bentley who took 10 hunters with him into the jungle and only he returned. When questioned by Sita, Bentley says that he discovered that the stampedes were caused by mammoths. Singh feels guilty for hiring Bentley as one of the 10 hunters killed was his young brother.

After another raid Sita decides that she and Singh will find the elephants and stop the stampedes. Bentley wants to join them to save his reputation, and takes along some hand-grenades as he thinks they will be more effective than just the guns of the platoon of soldiers Sita is taking. Sita's young servant Babu also tags along. At the village Bentley notices the food is untouched and theorizes that the elephants are stampeding through fear, not hunger.

They follow the elephants trail into the jungle, followed by Chandrakaul, a villager who resents the progressive policies of Sita and her father and is determined to kill Sita. One night a bear is let into Bentley's tent. But Bentley has swapped with Sita's Aunt Samira, who is attacked. Bentley then finds a scorpion in the same tent and suspects Singh is responsible. Samira returns home and begs Sita to go with her but she refuses.

They cross a ravine by a log bridge. When they are attacked by the mammoths they make for the bridge but Chandrakaul has pushed it into the ravine. Singh shoots Chandrakaul, the others take refuge in the nearby hills. They shoot and throw grenades at the mammoths but this has little effect. Babu's monkey arms a grenade which rolls towards Sita. Bentley dives on the grenade, which explodes bringing down the mountain Singh and Sita drag Bentley under an overhang as the landslide apparently kills the mammoths and a few of the soldiers. Before Bentley dies he says he was going to leave without telling Singh about his brother.

== Cast ==
- Rod Cameron as Steve Bentley
- Cesar Romero as Rama Singh
- Marie Windsor as Princess Mari
- Sulochana as Aunt Sumira
- M. N. Nambiar as Mahaji
- David Abraham as Prime Minister
- Ramakrishna as Babu

== Soundtrack ==
The film features music by G. Ramanathan, which includes Tamil songs.

== Critical reception ==
Writing for PopMatters in 2013, David Maine wrote that "Low on monsters, but the unusual setting and musical interludes lend it an undeniably different feel from other films of the decade. Still pretty dull though".

== See also ==
- Science fiction films in India
