= Swetha Suresh =

Indian whistler (born 1991)

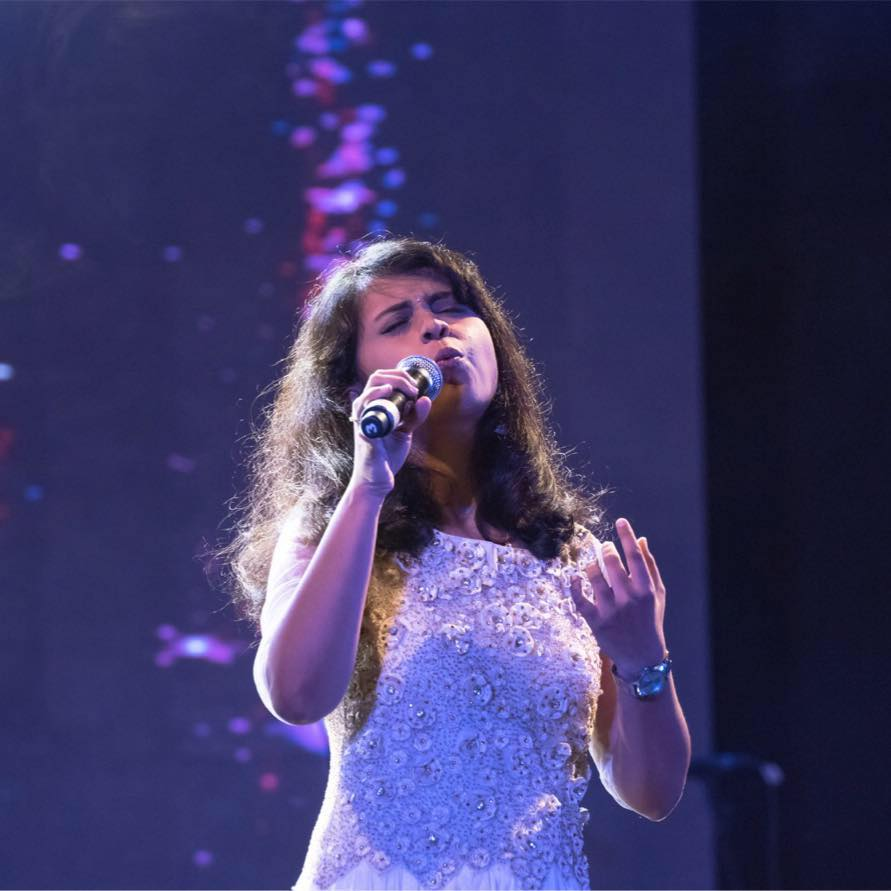
- Born: 5 September 1991 (age 34)
- Occupation: Whistler / Musician
- Years active: 1999-present
- Parent: Suresh Ganapathy

Swetha Suresh (born 5 September 1991) is the first Indian woman to win two first prizes in the World Whistling Convention from India. Swetha is commonly referred to as "Whistling Queen", and she is an accomplished Bharathanatyam dancer and classical singer. She is also a member of the lesser-known Indian Whistlers Association alongside 400 other whistling enthusiasts. She has performed in more than 6,000 shows. She is an Audio engineer by academics.

== World Whistling Convention ==
Swetha, being a trained classical singer and Bharathanatyam dancer at a very young age, is now training herself in western-classical too. Swetha became the first Indian woman to win two first prizes in the World Whistling Convention 2016 held at Kawasaki, Japan which saw participation from a total of 6 countries including, Japan, India, Australia, Korea, the United States, and Venezuela. Popularly known as the ‘Whistling Queen’ in the Indian Whistling Association, she now stands as the first female whistler in the country and is also in the number one position in Asia.

She danced and whistled simultaneously and won the world whistling queen title at World Whistling Convention 2016 in Japan.

== Movie works ==
- ‘Verasa Pogayile’ from Jilla
- ‘Yennada Yennada’ from Varuthapadatha Valibar Sangam
- ‘Paravaiya Parakkurom’ from Kayal
- The theme music of Pokkiri Raja was also her whistling, as she has for Vikram Prabhu's movie Wagah
- ‘Kurumba Kurumba’ from Tik Tik Tik
