= Shakti Soundar Rajan =

Indian film director (born 1982)

- Born: 10 March 1982 (age 44); Karur, Tamil Nadu, India
- Occupations: Film Director; Screenwriter
- Years active: 2010–present

Shakti Soundar Rajan is an Indian film director who predominantly works in Tamil cinema. He is known for directing experimental films that introduce new concepts to Tamil cinema.

== Career ==
Rajan worked as an assistant director to Venkat Prabhu. His debut movie was Naanayam, released in 2010. In 2014, he directed Naaigal Jaakirathai, which received stellar reviews from both the critics and the audience. After this movie, Shakti achieved a certain stance in the industry. Following the zombie film Miruthan (2016), and a space film in Tik Tik Tik (2018), Shakti Soundar Rajan returned with one of the country's first live-action animated films, Teddy (2021). In 2022, he directed the science fiction monster film Captain.

== Filmmaking style ==
Rajan has a reputation for introducing different concepts to Tamil cinema relative to Hollywood films. His second film, Naaigal Jaakirathai, was the first Tamil film to feature a dog as the main protagonist. His third film, Miruthan, was the first Tamil film to feature zombies. Rajan's fifth film, Teddy, is he first Tamil film to use an Indian animation company to design a special animated character and the second Tamil film (after Rajinikanth's Kochadaiiyaan) to use motion-capture technology, marking the new wave of animation usage in Tamil industry. His sixth film, Captain, is the first Indian creature-based film.

For his first two films, Rajan has collaborated with music directors James Vasanthan and Dharan Kumar, after which he has collaborated with music director D. Imman for his subsequent films.

== Filmography ==
Year	Film	Notes
2010	Naanayam	Money heist film Inspired from The Bank Job and Inside Man
2014	Naaigal Jaakirathai	Inspired from Turner & Hooch
2016	Miruthan	First Tamil film to feature zombies Inspired from Dawn of the Dead
2018	Tik Tik Tik	Inspired from Armageddon
2021	Teddy	First Tamil film to use an Indian animation company to design a special animated character Inspired from Ted
2022	Captain	First Indian creature-based film Inspired from Predator
