= Indru Netru Naalai =

2015 Indian film by R. Ravikumar

- Theatrical release poster
- Directed by: R. Ravikumar
- Written by: R. Ravikumar; Rajan Radhamanalan (dialogue)
- Produced by: C. V. Kumar; K. E. Gnanavel Raja
- Starring: Vishnu Vishal; Miya George; Karunakaran
- Cinematography: A. Vasanth
- Edited by: Leo John Paul
- Music by: Hiphop Tamizha
- Production companies: Thirukumaran Entertainment; Studio Green
- Distributed by: Abi & Abi Pictures; Dream Factory
- Release date: 26 June 2015
- Running time: 146 minutes
- Country: India
- Language: Tamil

Indru Netru Naalai (transl. Today, Yesterday, Tomorrow) is a 2015 Indian Tamil-language science fiction black comedy film written and directed by R. Ravikumar. The film stars Vishnu Vishal, Miya George and Karunakaran, while P. Ravi Shankar, Jayaprakash and T. M. Karthik play supporting roles, and Arya makes a special appearance. It revolves around two men coming into possession of a time machine and abusing it for financial benefits, leading to chaotic consequences.

Indru Netru Naalai is the feature debut of Ravikumar, previously a short film director. The film, jointly produced by Thirukumaran Entertainment and Studio Green, was shot between October 2014 and January 2015. It was released on 26 June 2015 and received positive reviews from critics. Ravikumar won the Behindwoods Gold Medal for Best Screenplay Writer.

== Plot ==
In 2065, a scientist invents a time machine. To prove its capability, he sends it back in time to 2015, programming it to return within forty seconds. However, the machine does not return.

The time machine is seen by three people in 2015 — Elango, an aspiring entrepreneur whose ideas are rejected by all and who is struggling to maintain his relationship with his rich girlfriend Anu, who is embarrassed at the fact that Elango is unemployed; Elango's best friend Pulivetti Arumugam, a fake astrologer; and an inventor Giridhara Parthasarathy, who makes a living by repairing home appliances. The three of them are involved in an accident and witness the time machine while recovering from the shock. While Parthasarathy decides to keep the time machine for himself, he suffers an electric shock and ends up in a coma, prompting Elango and Arumugam to steal the time machine from Parthasarathy's shop. The duo uses the time machine to make Arumugam's astrology practice seem successful by going back in time and finding things lost by people under the guise of astrology. Elango further uses the machine to impress Anu's industrialist father Rajarathinam by going to the future, obtaining the stock market results and successfully "predicting" them in front of Rajarathinam and his company's board of directors. Rajarathinam soon approves the marriage of Anu to Elango.

Things go smoothly until Elango and Arumugam inadvertently thwart an encounter to kill Kuzhandaivelu, a dreaded gangster and extortionist who is targeting Rajarathinam, during one of their trips to the past to find yet another item for Arumugam's client. In the present, Kuzhandaivelu is plotting to kill Rajarathinam for his role in planning the encounter and also Elango and Arumugam for (unknowingly) attacking him in a parking lot. Elango and Anu's marriage is postponed indefinitely as a result.

Elango and Arumugam go back to the past to fix their mistake, but Kuzhandaivelu accidentally shoots the time machine while fighting a police officer during the encounter, damaging it. The duo find Parthasarathy, who has awoken from his coma but does not remember them, and ask him to fix the time machine. While Parthasarathy manages to fix the time machine, due to a lack of specific parts which have not yet been developed, it can only take the user to a specific time in the past (when Kuzhandaivelu damaged the time machine) and as the date cannot be changed, the user cannot return to the future. Therefore, the duo decide not to use it. Later, Kuzhandaivelu spots Elango, Arumugam and Anu at a mall and pursues them. He opens fire during the chase, killing Anu. To restore Anu to life, Elango decides to use the time machine to return to the past and kill Kuzhandaivelu, even though he cannot return. But Kuzhandaivelu spots the duo and while fighting them, all three of them fall into the time machine and go to the past. Kuzhandaivelu destroys the time machine, but Elango manages to trick Kuzhandaivelu into shooting his past self, causing both versions to die. Elango and Arumugam stop themselves from finding the time machine by thwarting the accident involving them and Parthasarathy.

Two months later, Elango wakes up, remembering only the events of that night. He soon finds out, to his surprise, that he is in a marriage hall and that he will marry Anu on that day. He does not remember, to Anu's bewilderment, any of the events which had occurred in the past two months as a result of his usage of the time machine during that period. He learns that, without finding the time machine, he got a job and managed to impress Rajarathinam with one of his business ideas, leading to his marriage with Anu. Arumugam, who also does not remember anything over the past two months, is happily married. Elango and Arumugam are relieved to learn that Kuzhandaivelu is still dead. They also see Parthasarathy, who does not recognise them as they never met in the past two months.

Since the time machine was never seen, it returns to 2065, and the scientist celebrates its success.

== Cast ==
- Vishnu Vishal as Elango
- Arya as the scientist (special appearance)
- Miya George as Anu
- Karunakaran as Pulivetti "Puli" Arumugam
- P. Ravi Shankar as Kuzhandaivelu
- Jayaprakash as Rajarathinam
- T. M. Karthik as Giridhara Parthasarathy
- Bagavathi Perumal as Elango's boss
- Anupama Kumar as Anu's mother
- Anjali Varadarajan as Elango's mother
- V. S. Raghavan as Victim
- Jeeva Ravi as Ravishankar
- Munishkanth as an actor
- Ramachandran Durairaj as Kuzhandaivelu's henchman
- V. I. S. Jayapalan as Marthandam
- K. Sivasankar as the jewellery store owner
- Raja Rani Pandian as the constable
- K. Manikandan as the film director
- Thangadurai as Maragatha (Mani's husband)
- Mippusamy as Thief
- Gandhi Kanagaraj as Mahatma Gandhi
- Sumathi G. as Parthasarathy's neighbour
- Smruthi Venkat as the Priyam TV reporter
- Kavin as Anu's imaginary husband (uncredited)

== Production ==
Indru Netru Naalai is the directorial debut feature of R. Ravikumar, previously a short film director. After making the short Zero Kilometer, based on the wormhole concept, he wanted to make a feature film on the same subject, but later found it unsuitable. Nalan Kumarasamy then suggested he make a film based on time travel, and Ravikumar conceived the story of Indru Netru Naalai. Vishnu Vishal announced he was part of the project in October 2014. Miya George signed on as the lead actress, and to honour her commitments to this film, opted out of My God. Principal photography began in late October 2014. In early November, Vishal took a brief hiatus from filming due to developing conjunctivitis. Filming wrapped in January 2015. The visual effects and CGI were handled by Phantom Effects.

== Music ==
Indru Netru Naalai

Soundtrack album by Hiphop Tamizha
- Released: 12 June 2015
- Genre: Feature film soundtrack
- Length: 14:54
- Language: Tamil
- Label: Think Music
- Producer: Hiphop Tamizha

Hiphop Tamizha chronology
Aambala (2015)	Indru Netru Naalai (2015)	Thani Oruvan (2015)

The film's soundtrack album and background score were composed by Hiphop Tamizha. The audio launch was held on 12 June 2015.

Track listing
No.	Title	Lyrics	Singer	Length
1.	"iPhone 6 Nee Yendral"	Hiphop Tamizha	Hiphop Tamizha	02:42
2.	"Kadhale Kadhale"	Vivek	Shankar Mahadevan, Padmalatha	03:27
3.	"Naane Thaan Raja"	Muthamil, Hiphop Tamizha	Anthony Daasan, Hiphop Tamizha	03:35
4.	"Indru Netru Naalai"	Hiphop Tamizha	Shankar Mahadevan, Aalap Raju	03:05
5.	"The Conquest of Time Theme"		Hiphop Tamizha	02:05
Total length:				14:54

== Release and reception ==
Indru Netru Naalai was released on 26 June 2015, and received positive reviews from critics. Baradwaj Rangan, writing for The Hindu, called it "A fun ride with a time machine". S. Saraswathi of Rediff.com gave the film 3.5/5 stars, praising the direction, screenplay, and performances of the cast members. She concluded by saying that Indru Netru Naalai is "worth watching".

M. Suganth of The Times of India gave it 3.5/5 and stated "Indru Netru Naalai is a refreshing and well-made sci-fi film that will keep you entertained from start to finish. The film's concept is original and well-executed, and the performances are all top-notch. Vishnu is particularly good in the lead role, and he is ably supported by Karunakaran and Mia George. The film's special effects are also impressive, and they help to create a believable and immersive world. Overall, Indru Netru Naalai is a must-see for fans of sci-fi films". Anupama Subramanian of Deccan Chronicle wrote, "Though there were few predictable moments, pace suffers at times and some of the jokes fall flat, it is Ravikumar's skilful writing, the presentation without any logical loopholes and a nice ending with a powerful message that carries Indru Netru Naalai all the way through".

== Potential sequel ==
On 18 January 2021, a sequel was announced with a puja ceremony. The filmmakers revealed that Vishal and Karunakaran were retained for the sequel. It would be directed by debutant Karthik Ponraj SP with music composed by Ghibran. However, the film ended up in development hell. In February 2024, Vishal stated that he was unsure whether development was still continuing. That April, Bharath Menon was revealed to be the new director, with the story being by Ravikumar.

== See also ==
- Science fiction films in India
