= R. Ravikumar =

Indian Tamil film director (born 1984)

- Born: Rajendran Ravikumar; 13 May 1984 (age 42); Tiruppur, Tamil Nadu, India
- Occupations: Film director; screenwriter
- Years active: 2015–present
- Spouse: Priya Ganesan (m. 2016)
- Children: 2

Rajendran Ravikumar (born 13 May 1984) is an Indian film director and screenwriter who works primarily in Tamil films. He is best known for his science fiction films Indru Netru Naalai (2015) and Ayalaan (2024).

== Career ==
Ravikumar is a native of Tiruppur. He was not initially passionate about cinema until a friend from Dubai gave him an amateur camera in the early 2000s. With that camera, Ravikumar taught himself filmmaking and made several short films from 2004 to the remainder of the decade. Some of his shorts were later shortlisted for the reality show Naalaya Iyakunar, where he finished at third. After his stint at Naalaya Iyakunar, Ravikumar began to take cinema as his career, and became an assistant director under Nalan Kumarasamy during Soodhu Kavvum (2013). He later made his feature directorial debut with the science fiction film Indru Netru Naalai (2015), for which he won the Behindwoods Gold Medal for Best Screenplay Writer. Ravikumar's second directorial feature was announced in 2016. The science fiction film, later titled Ayalaan, began production in 2018, languished in production hell and was released only in 2024, but was well received. Shortly after the film's success, he was signed on to direct its sequel. In March 2026, he was revealed to be directing a film produced by Mythri Movie Makers, tentatively titled #MythriTamil03. The film began production in November 2026.

== Filmmaking style ==
An avid reader of Tamil literature, Ravikumar noted that such novels influence his thinking style.

== Personal life ==
Ravikumar married Priya Ganesan in 2016. They have a daughter born in 2018, and a son born in 2024. Ravikumar's mother died in March 2021.

== Filmography ==
Year	Film	Notes
2015	Indru Netru Naalai	
2024	Ayalaan	Cameo appearance
TBA	Soori 07	Mythri Movie Makers' third Tamil production
