= Miruthan =

2016 Indian Tamil film by Shakti Soundar Rajan

- Theatrical release poster
- Directed by: Shakti Soundar Rajan
- Written by: Shakti Soundar Rajan
- Produced by: S. Michael Rayappan
- Starring: Ravi Mohan; Lakshmi Menon; Anikha Surendran
- Cinematography: S. Venkatesh
- Edited by: K. J. Venkatramanan
- Music by: D. Imman
- Production company: Global Infotainment
- Distributed by: Ayngaran International Media
- Release date: 19 February 2016
- Running time: 105 minutes
- Country: India
- Language: Tamil

Miruthan (transl. Zombie) is a 2016 Indian Tamil-language action horror film written and directed by Shakti Soundar Rajan and produced by S. Michael Rayappan. The film stars Ravi Mohan (credited as Jayam Ravi), Lakshmi Menon, and Anikha Surendran, while Kaali Venkat, Sriman, R. N. R. Manohar, and Amit Bhargav play supporting roles. D. Imman composed the music, while Venkatesh S. handled the cinematography and K. J. Venkatramanan handled the editing. Shot in Ooty and Coimbatore within 54 days, the film derives its title from a hybrid of two words, Mirugam (transl. Animal) and Manithan (transl. Man).

The film depicts a zombie apocalypse in around Ooty, Coonoor, Coimbatore in the state of Tamil Nadu that starts after a poisonous liquid spills from a container outside a chemical laboratory in Ooty. The film revolves around a traffic cop who along with his sister, a politician, and his best friend, try to help the escape of a group of doctors one of whom is his love interest to Coimbatore to find a cure for the virus.

Prior to its release, the film faced issues when the Central Board of Film Certification granted it an A (adults only) rating. The makers approached the revising committee that passed the film with a U/A (parental guidance) rating.

Along with a Telugu dubbed version titled Yamapasham, the film was released theatrically on 19 February 2016 before the 2016 Tamil Nadu Legislative Assembly election. Miruthan has also been screened at multiple film festivals such as the Neuchâtel International Fantastic Film Festival, the Fantasia International Film Festival (the second Tamil film after Billa to get selected for this festival), the MOTELx - Lisbon International Horror Film Festival, Mórbido Fest, the Sitges Film Festival, the Yubari International Fantastic Film Festival and the Bucheon International Fantastic Film Festival. Later, Jayam Ravi introduced plans to make the sequel Miruthan 2 as a superhero film so as to cater to younger audiences as well.

== Plot ==
A container of toxic liquid spills from a transport vehicle at a chemical laboratory in Ooty. A stray dog consumes it and turns violent, which then bites a security guard. The security guard turns into a zombie within hours and starts a chain of human infections via bites.

Elsewhere, Karthik is a traffic police sub-inspector in Ooty who avoids all risky and dangerous ventures for taking care of his younger sister Vidya, who is in her early teens. Both are orphans who cohabitate with Karthik's friend Chinnamalai, another traffic police constable. Karthik is in love with a cardiologist named Renuka aka Renu, is unaware. Renu is engaged and is about to marry an NRI named Naveen, who is also a cardiologist. Karthik crosses a tumultuous with Minister Gurumoorthy by allowing an auto carrying pregnant women in Gurumoorthy's way. The next morning, Karthik finds that Vidya has gone missing. While looking for her, he is suddenly attacked by a swarm of zombies. At the same time, the police of Ooty is informed of the outbreak and is ordered to shoot down anyone who has turned into a zombie. Karthik looks for Vidya by putting up posters of his missing sister while also killing zombies in his way that he encounters. He receives a call telling him to arrive at a place to find his sister. There, he finds Renu and a group of doctors, including the chief doctor Dharan, all working to find a cure against the undead. At Renu's house, Karthik and Chinnamalai find Gurumoorthy, Renu's father, and learn that Gurumoorthy has kidnapped Vidya for vengeance. Karthik finds Vidhya at a swimming pool, surrounded by Gurumoorthy's zombified henchmen, and discovers that the zombies are hydrophobic. Renu tells Karthik to save the doctors trapped inside the house, which zombies have invaded.

Escorted by Karthik, the team comprising Dharan, Renu, another doctor Kamal, Gurumoorthy, Chinnamalai, and Vidya heads to Coimbatore, where they have the medical equipment to find a cure to cure the zombia virus. By this time, Dharan who has sustained a scratch from a zombie that has a delayed onset of infection starts experiencing symptoms. He chooses not to disclose it to anyone, fearing the consequences for his own safety. When they arrive near Mettuplayam, they unexpectedly discover that the infection has already spread to Coimbatore. The zombie crowd surrounds the police van, so Karthik is forced to drive rashly to kill the zombies one by one. Later, Gurumoorthy unknowingly disturbs some zombies, and Karthik ends up shooting them, which attracts the attention of a nearby zombie horde. They are all forced to take shelter in a mall opposite the hospital. Meanwhile, Naveen is inside the hospital trying to find a cure. They get hold of Shri, a frightened security guard of the mall.

After a few hours, Dharan turns into a zombie and bites Vidya. Karthik kills Dharan with his gun, and fearing for Vidya and others' safety, separates from the group taking Vidya along with him and barricading himself inside a store. But, surprisingly Vidya does not turn into a zombie. The doctors deduce that Vidya might naturally possess the antibodies and immunity to fight the virus and plan to use her for the cure. Karthik has to escort them to the hospital, which faces the mall. For this, he uses pressurized water from the mall's fire truck, knowing that they are allergic to water. Despite the shorter time frame, Karthik manages to get everyone safely to the hospital except Renu. He goes back to the mall to bring Renu, but he does so without water. He leads Renu to the hospital but gets bitten by the zombies while escorting her. He himself slowly turns into a zombie, but he safely escorts her to the hospital before his human feelings are lost, and also advises Renu to shoot him. She is too adamant about knowing why he saved her, despite Naveen's uncaring attempts and her selfish father, and realizes his love for her, but Karthik turns into a zombie. Thus, Renu shoots him.

The doctors find the required antidote and start addressing the virus. Later, Karthik, now completely a zombie, is seen above a bus bound for Chennai, implying that Renu did not shoot him properly and he has survived the attack, possibly alluding to a sequel.

== Cast ==
- Ravi Mohan as Traffic Sub-Inspector Karthik
- Lakshmi Menon as Dr. Renuka
- Anikha Surendran as Vidhya, Karthik's sister
- Kaali Venkat as Traffic Constable Chinnamalai
- Sriman as Shri
- R. N. R. Manohar as Minister Gurumoorthy
- Amit Bhargav as Dr. Naveen
- Jeeva Ravi as Chief Dr. Dharan
- Crane Manohar as Wedding Broker
- Nellai Siva as Gurumoorthy's henchman
- Raghavan Durairaj as Assistant Dr. Kamal
- Dhilip Rayan as Karthik's friend

== Production ==
The film was announced on 14 January 2015, after the shooting of Ravi's another project of the year, Romeo Juliet was completed. Filming began in March 2015, after Ravi Mohan accepted an offer from Shakti Soundar Rajan to feature in a film produced by Michael Rayappan. Lakshmi Menon subsequently joined the team to portray the film's heroine. The team shot for thirty days in Ooty in May 2015, before returning to Chennai to complete portions. In July 2015, a schedule was held at Binny Mills, where the art direction team had erected a set costing 1.5 crore rupees. As of January 2016, the filming was completely ended.

== Soundtrack ==
Miruthan

Soundtrack album by D. Imman
- Released: 19 January 2016 (Tamil); 08 March 2016 (Telugu as Yamapasham)
- Recorded: 2014–2015
- Studios: Vijaya Vahini Studio, Chennai
- Genre: Feature film soundtrack
- Label: Sony Music
- Producer: D. Imman

D. Imman chronology
10 Enradhukulla (2015)	Miruthan (2016)	Pokkiri Raja (2016)

D. Imman composed the soundtrack.

Track list
No.	Title	Lyrics	Singer(s)	Length
1.	"Munnal Kadhali"	Madhan Karky	Vishal Dadlani, Sharanya Gopinath
2.	"Bitten by Insanity (Theme)"		D. Imman
3.	"Veri Veri Veri"	Madhan Karky	Suraj Jagan, Maria Kavita Thomas
4.	"Mirutha Mirutha"	Madhan Karky	Shreya Ghoshal, Vijay Yesudas
5.	"Horrifying Zombies (Theme)"		D. Imman
6.	"Munnal Kadhali (Reprise)"	Madhan Karky	Haricharan
7.	"Munnal Kadhali (Karaoke version)"
8.	"Mirudha Mirudha (Karaoke version)"

== Release ==
The film was later dubbed into Hindi and Malayalam. In Hindi, it was released with the name as Daring Rakhwala on Zee Cinema and in Malayalam, it was released with the same name of the original title 'Miruthan'.

== Reception ==
Sudhir Srinivasan of The Hindu said that Miruthan was an inconsistent ‘zombie’ film with excessive melodrama. Latha Srinivasan of dna gave 2 stars and said, "The zombies of Hollywood won't do a far better job of entertaining you than Miruthan. Times of India gave 2.5/5 and wrote, "Like, you want to praise the makers for trying something different — the first zombie film in Tamil cinema, in this case — but immediately, you are worst with another thought: 'Did the first zombie film in Tamil have to be this clumsy and unexciting?'

== Box office ==
The film collected ₹10.66 crore (US$1.1 million) in Tamil Nadu in first weekend and ₹20.13 crore (US$2.1 million) worldwide.

== Sequel ==
In March 2016, Shakti Soundar Rajan announced his plans to make a sequel of the film in the future. He later began a different film featuring Jayam Ravi in the lead role titled Tik Tik Tik. Shakti Soundar Rajan announced and planned to do Miruthan 2 in 2025 and it is in pre-production, planning to start shooting in 2025.
