= Tik Tik Tik (2018 film) =

2018 film by Shakti Soundar Rajan

- Theatrical release poster
- Directed by: Shakti Soundar Rajan
- Written by: Shakti Soundar Rajan
- Produced by: Nemichand Jhabak
- Starring: Ravi Mohan; Nivetha Pethuraj; Aaron Aziz
- Cinematography: S. Venkatesh
- Edited by: Pradeep E. Ragav
- Music by: D. Imman
- Production company: Nemichand Jhabak
- Distributed by: Screen Scene International
- Release date: 22 June 2018
- Running time: 130 minutes
- Country: India
- Language: Tamil

Tik Tik Tik is a 2018 Indian Tamil-language science fiction action film written and directed by Shakti Soundar Rajan. The film features Ravi Mohan, Nivetha Pethuraj, Aaron Aziz, Ramesh Thilak, Arjunan, Vincent Asokan and Jayaprakash. It is inspired from the 1998 Michael Bay film Armageddon.

The film was released on 22 June 2018, and received mixed reviews from critics, who praised Ravi's performance, the cinematography, background score, soundtrack and VFX, but criticised its logic-defying sequences and writing.

== Plot ==
The DSD team, led by Mahendran, discovers that an asteroid will strike the Bay of Bengal in seven days, threatening eastern India. As destroying it requires a heavy missile and there is insufficient time to obtain one through official channels, the team secretly plans to steal it from a Chinese space station, with only the Prime Minister, Home Minister and Defence Minister informed. To transport the missile into space, they recruit expert thieves: escape artist Vasu and his friends Venkat and Appu, who are joined by DSD members Swathi and Raguram. After training, they board Dhruva 1.

Before launch, Vasu receives a mysterious message revealing that his son Ravi has been kidnapped. The voice orders him to sabotage the mission by cutting wires, causing a fuel leak. Vasu complies after feigning unconsciousness, but the resulting malfunction sends Dhruva 1 into a lunar crash. The crew repair the ship and, with little fuel remaining, use a request to refuel at the space station as a pretext to gain entry. Meanwhile, Lt. Gen. T. Rithika discovers footage of Vasu cutting the wires, but Mahendran chooses not to investigate.

Dhruva 1 docks at the station, where the crew are arrested by Captain Li Wei. They learn that the station personnel know their mission and intend to delay them until the asteroid strikes the Bay of Bengal, destroying India while creating lucrative rebuilding opportunities for China. During a power outage engineered by Venkat and Appu, Vasu obtains Li Wei's fingerprint and iris data and apparently removes the missile without triggering the alarm system. After Li Wei interrogates and assaults them, Vasu claims the missile is aboard Dhruva 1 and threatens to launch it at Beijing unless the crew are released. He then secretly retrieves the real missile and escapes through space, though a collision punctures his spacesuit and drains his oxygen. He reaches Dhruva 1 and is revived.

Dhruva 2 arrives to refuel Dhruva 1, and the reason for the earlier sabotage is revealed: it enabled Dhruva 2 to be mobilised. The mysterious voice orders Vasu to surrender the missile to its crew. Rithika overhears the communication and confronts Mahendran, who kills her and reveals that he is the voice. He intends to sell the missile on the black market.

As Dhruva 1 approaches the asteroid, the crew discover that the missile appears to be missing. Ravi is released, while Mahendran sends them footage of Vasu's sabotage and blames him for the crisis. The crew then reveal that the real missile remains aboard Dhruva 1: Vasu had told Swathi and Raghuram about the voice and supplied Dhruva 2 with a decoy. The ship's systems were also hacked to falsely indicate that the asteroid had crossed the safety line. The missile destroys the asteroid, but debris damages Dhruva 1. The crew evacuate safely and return to Earth.

Ravi exposes Mahendran after recovering his gold chain. Days later, during a medal ceremony, Vasu reveals that the entire crew knows Mahendran's crimes. Mahendran kills himself backstage, while Vasu, Appu and Venkat leave.

== Cast ==
- Ravi Mohan as M. Vasudevan, a trained magician
- Nivetha Pethuraj as Lt. M. Swathi
- Aaron Aziz as Captain Lee Wei, Chinese captain of the space station
- Aarav Ravi as Ravi Vasudevan, Vasu's son
- Ramesh Thilak as S. Venkat
- Arjunan as K. Appu
- Vincent Asokan as Brig. D. Raguram
- Jayaprakash as Chief K. Mahendran
- Rethika Srinivas as Lt. Gen. T. Rithika
- Balaji Venugopal as Team head
- Aathma Patrick as Terrorist
- Jeeva Ravi as Police officer

== Production ==
=== Development ===
After working together in Miruthan (2016), Ravi Mohan was again impressed by a storyline narrated by Shakti Soundar Rajan and agreed to work on another film in March 2016. Jhabak Movies agreed to produce the venture. It was promoted as the first Indian film in the space genre although Kalai Arasi (1963) had a similar genre. The team began pre-production work thereafter, with Ravi describing it as the biggest film in his career.

=== Casting and crew ===
Nivetha Pethuraj joined the film's cast in September 2016. She was selected due to her knowledge of martial arts; she is trained in jujutsu and kickboxing. Aaron Aziz, a Malaysian-based actor who mostly performed in Malaysian and Singaporean drama and films, was selected for a villainous role, marking his entry into Tamil cinema. Ravi's son, Aarav, plays the role of his son in this film too.

=== Filming ===
Filming began in October 2016 at EVP Film City and Majestic Studio in Chennai. The film was also shot in Munnar, where shooting was halted for a while due to the arrival of forest elephants near the shooting spot. Filming wrapped in October 2017. The total duration of VFX scenes in the film is 80 minutes.

== Music ==
The film's score and songs were composed by D. Imman in his 100th album. The title track was released on 11 December 2017. The song was sung by Yogi B, Yuvan Shankar Raja and Sunitha Sarathy. The full album was released on 6 January 2018. The album has eight songs, four of which are instrumental songs (two theme songs and two karaoke songs). All the songs were written by Madhan Karky. "Kurumba" (Father's Love) in the film featured real photographs and videos from Ravi Mohan's personal family collection.

Tik Tik Tik

Soundtrack album by D. Imman
- Released: 6 January 2018
- Genre: Feature film soundtrack
- Length: 35:38
- Language: Tamil
- Label: Sony Music
- Producer: D. Imman

D. Imman chronology
Panjumittai (2018)	Tik Tik Tik (2018)	Kadaikutty Singam (2018)

Singles from Tik Tik Tik
- 1. "Tik Tik Tik (Title Track)" Released: 11 December 2017

No.	Title	Lyrics	Singers	Length
1.	"Tik Tik Tik (Title Track)"	Madhan Karky	Yuvan Shankar Raja, Sunitha Sarathy & Yogi B	4:09
2.	"Kurumba (Father's Love)"	Madhan Karky	Sid Sriram, Swetha Suresh (Whistle)	4:27
3.	"Vinveera Vinveera Idhu"	Madhan Karky	Ranjith & Sri Rascol	4:33
4.	"Kurumba [Reprise] (Mother's Love)"	Madhan Karky	Miruthula Siva	4:24
5.	"Race Against Time"	D. Imman	-	2:06
6.	"Far Beyond Earth"	-	Instrumental	3:16
7.	"Tik Tik Tik (Karaoke)"	-	Instrumental	4:09
8.	"Kurumba (Karaoke)"	-	Instrumental	4:25
Total length:				35:38

== Release ==
=== Theatrical ===
The film was initially scheduled to be released theatrically on 26 January 2018, but released almost five months later on 22 June. It was distributed by Screen Scene in Tamil Nadu.

=== Home media ===
The satellite rights of the film were sold to Sun TV.

== Reception ==
=== Box office ===
Tamil Nadu theatrical rights of the film were sold for ₹10.5 crore. Tik Tik Tik grossed ₹ 3 crore on its first day and ₹ 12 crore in first three days in Tamil Nadu. The film collected over ₹18 crore (US$1.9 million) in Tamil Nadu in the second weekend. The film grossed US$45,724 in USA, MYR 2,233,745 in Malaysia, £10,480 in UK, A$34,493 in Australia, and NZ$3,424 in New Zealand in its opening weekend. The film collected US$68,812 in USA, £19,046 in UK, and A$49,176 in Australia by the end of the second weekend. Tik Tik Tik collected £20,888 in UK, and MYR 5,201,436 in Malaysia by the end of the third weekend. The film collected MYR 5,11,504 (₹ 86.6 lacs) in Malaysia by the end of the fourth weekend.

=== Critical response ===
Tik Tik Tik received mixed reviews from critics. On the review aggregator website Rotten Tomatoes, 43% of 7 critics' reviews are positive, with an average rating of 5/10.

Thinkal Menon of The Times of India praised the film for the laudable attempt and gave it 3.5 stars out of 5. Writing for Firstpost, Sreedhar Pillai praised it as a reasonably entertaining film with a novel concept and gave it 3 out of 5 stars. Manoj Kumar R of The Indian Express said that the concept is not original and gave it 4 out of 5 stars. Sowmya Rajendran of The News Minute praised the film for its impressive VFX scenes. Vikram Venkateswaran of The Quint called the film a harmless entertainer and gave it 3 stars. Sudhir Srinivasan of Cinema Express admired the efforts of the director in this space genre film and gave it 3 stars.

Priyanka Sundar of Hindustan Times called it a film without logic and gave it 1.5 stars. Gautaman Bhaskaran of News18 stated that the film is an unimpressive story, and gave it 1.5 stars. Kirubhakar Purushothaman of India Today called the film a typical underwhelming commercial film set in space, and gave it 1.5 stars. Vishal Menon of The Hindu termed the film simplistic in nature. J. Hurtado of Screen Anarchy noted that the film had many similarities to Armageddon (1998), one of which included the human mission of saving the Earth from an asteroid.

Director Venkat Prabhu and actor Arvind Swami praised the film for the effort. A success celebration was held for the film in Chennai on 29 June 2018.

== See also ==
- List of films featuring space stations
