= SIIMA Award for Best Actress – Tamil =

Tamil-language media award

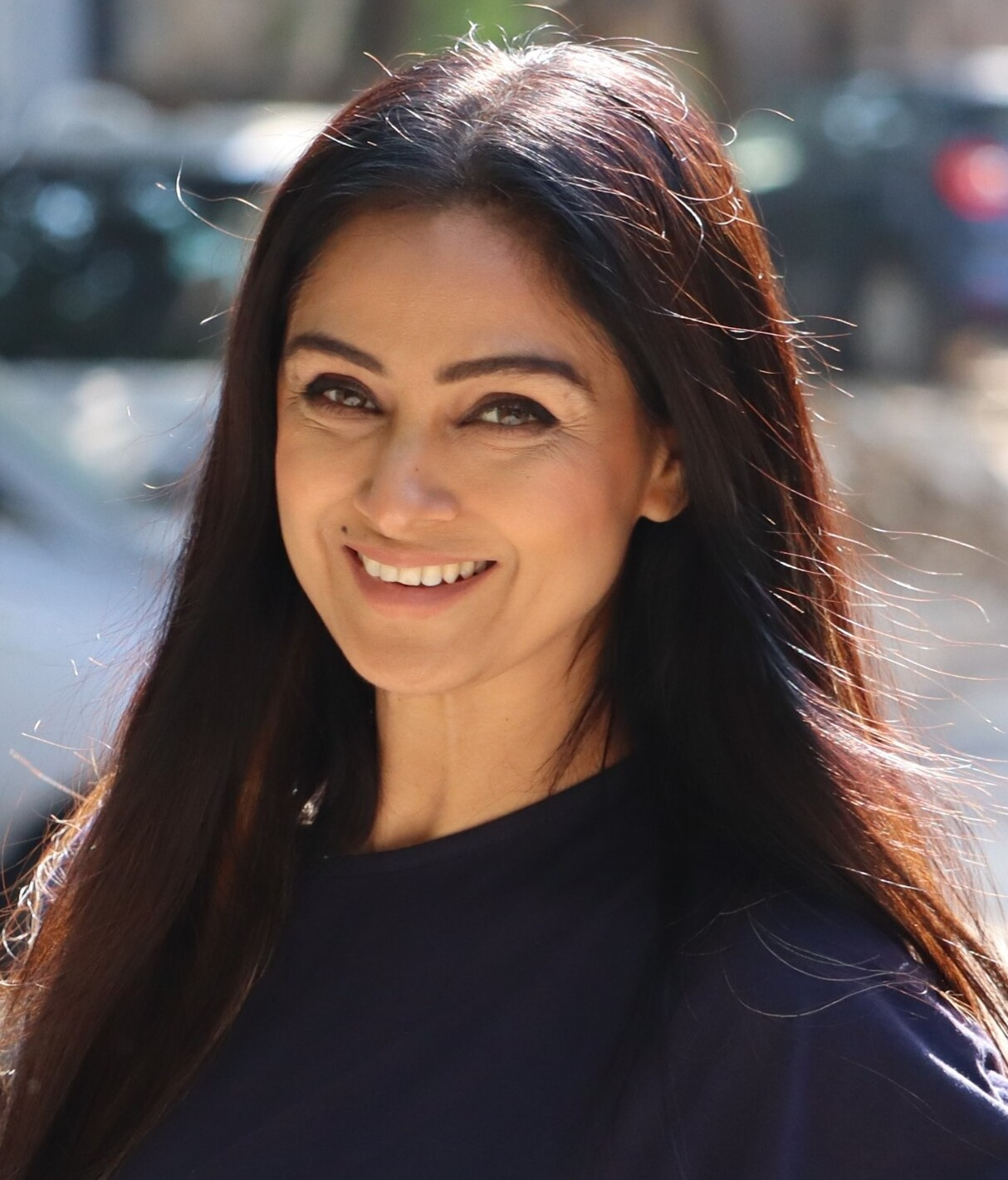
- The 2026 recipient: Simran
- Awarded for: Best Performance by an Actress in a Leading Role in Tamil cinema
- Country: India
- Presented by: Vibri Media Group
- First award: 22 June 2012 (for films released in 2011)
- Most recent winner: Simran, Tourist Family (2025)

Highlights
- Most wins: Nayanthara (5)
- Most nominations: Nayanthara (9)

SIIMA Award for Best Actress – Tamil is presented by Vibri media group as part of its annual South Indian International Movie Awards, for best acting done by an actress in Tamil films. The award was first given in 2012 for films released in 2011.

== Superlatives ==
Categories	Recipient	Notes
Most wins	Nayanthara	5
Most nominations	Nayanthara	9
Oldest winner	Trisha Krishnan	Age 40
Youngest winner	Hansika Motwani	Age 21

- Nayanthara has maximum awards with five wins, followed by Trisha Krishnan with three wins.
- One actress has won the awards in consecutive years: Nayanthara (2015–16) and (2016–17).
- Aishwarya Rajesh is the only actress to have also won the SIIMA Critics Award for Best Actress – Tamil.
- Hansika Motwani is the only actress to have also won the SIIMA Award for Best Female Debut – Tamil.
- Nayanthara has also received the most nominations with nine, followed by Aishwarya Rajesh with four.

== Superlatives : Multiple Winners ==
Wins	Recipient(s)
5	Nayanthara
3	Trisha Krishnan
2	Hansika Motwani

== Superlatives : Multiple Nominations ==
Nominations	Recipient(s)
9	Nayanthara
5	Aishwarya Rajesh, Keerthy Suresh
4	Jyothika, Hansika Motwani, Samantha Ruth Prabhu, Amala Paul, Trisha Krishnan, Nithya Menen
2	Tamannaah Bhatia, Sai Pallavi, Manju Warrier, Parvathy Thiruvothu, Dushara Vijayan

== Winners and nominees ==
Table key
‡	Indicates the winner

=== 2010s ===
Year	Actress	Film	Ref.
2011 (1st)	Asin ‡	Kaavalan	
2011 (1st)	Anjali	Engaeyum Eppothum	
2011 (1st)	Anushka Shetty	Deiva Thirumagal	
2011 (1st)	Hansika Motwani	Engeyum Kadhal	
2011 (1st)	Richa Gangopadhyay	Mayakkam Enna	
2012 (2nd)	Hansika Motwani ‡	Oru Kal Oru Kannadi	
2012 (2nd)	Kajal Aggarwal	Thuppakki	
2012 (2nd)	Amala Paul	Kadhalil Sodhappuvadhu Yeppadi	
2012 (2nd)	Shruti Haasan	3	
2012 (2nd)	Samantha	Neethaane En Ponvasantham	
2013 (3rd)	Trisha Krishnan ‡	Endrendrum Punnagai	
2013 (3rd)	Pooja Umashankar	Vidiyum Munn	
2013 (3rd)	Parvathy Thiruvothu	Mariyaan	
2013 (3rd)	Nayanthara	Raja Rani	
2013 (3rd)	Hansika Motwani	Theeya Velai Seiyyanum Kumaru	
2014 (4th)	Hansika Motwani ‡	Aranmanai	
2014 (4th)	Amala Paul	Velaiyilla Pattathari	
2014 (4th)	Samantha	Kaththi	
2014 (4th)	Lakshmi Menon	Jigarthanda	
2014 (4th)	Vedhika	Kaaviyathalaivan	
2015 (5th)	Nayanthara ‡	Naanum Rowdy Dhaan	
2015 (5th)	Nithya Menen	OK Kanmani	
2015 (5th)	Aishwarya Rajesh	Kaaka Muttai	
2015 (5th)	Amy Jackson	I	
2015 (5th)	Jyothika	36 Vayadhinile	
2016 (6th)	Nayanthara ‡	Iru Mugan	
2016 (6th)	Amala Paul	Amma Kanakku	
2016 (6th)	Samantha	Theri	
2016 (6th)	Tamannaah Bhatia	Dharma Durai	
2016 (6th)	Varalaxmi Sarathkumar	Tharai Thappattai	
2017 (7th)	Nayanthara ‡	Aramm	
2017 (7th)	Aditi Balan	Aruvi	
2017 (7th)	Andrea Jeremiah	Taramani	
2017 (7th)	Jyothika	Magalir Mattum	
2017 (7th)	Nithya Menen	Mersal	
2018 (8th)	Trisha Krishnan ‡	'96	
2018 (8th)	Aishwarya Rajesh	Kanaa	
2018 (8th)	Jyothika	Kaatrin Mozhi	
2018 (8th)	Nayanthara	Kolamavu Kokila	
2018 (8th)	Samantha	Irumbu Thirai	
2019 (9th)	Nayanthara ‡	Viswasam	
2019 (9th)	Amala Paul	Aadai	
2019 (9th)	Tamannaah Bhatia	Kanne Kalaimaane	
2019 (9th)	Manju Warrier	Asuran	
2019 (9th)	Jyothika	Raatchasi	

=== 2020s ===
Year	Actress	Film	Ref.
2020 (9th)	Aishwarya Rajesh ‡	Ka Pae Ranasingam	
2020 (9th)	Aparna Balamurali	Soorarai Pottru	
2020 (9th)	Nayanthara	Mookuthi Amman	
2020 (9th)	Sneha	Pattas	
2020 (9th)	Keerthy Suresh	Penguin	
2021 (10th)	Kangana Ranaut ‡	Thalaivii	
2021 (10th)	Nayanthara	Netrikann	
2021 (10th)	Lijomol Jose	Jai Bhim	
2021 (10th)	Keerthi Pandian	Anbirkiniyal	
2021 (10th)	Aishwarya Rajesh	Thittam Irandu	
2022 (11th)	Trisha Krishnan ‡	Ponniyin Selvan: I	
2022 (11th)	Aishwarya Lekshmi	Gatta Kusthi	
2022 (11th)	Dushara Vijayan	Natchathiram Nagargiradhu	
2022 (11th)	Keerthy Suresh	Saani Kaayidham	
2022 (11th)	Nithya Menen	Thiruchitrambalam	
2022 (11th)	Sai Pallavi	Gargi	
2023 (12th)	Nayanthara ‡	Annapoorani: The Goddess of Food	
2023 (12th)	Aishwarya Rai	Ponniyin Selvan: II	
2023 (12th)	Aishwarya Rajesh	Farhana	
2023 (12th)	Keerthy Suresh	Maamannan	
2023 (12th)	Trisha	Leo	
2023 (12th)	Meetha Raghunath	Good Night	
2024 (13th)	Sai Pallavi ‡	Amaran	
2024 (13th)	Dushara Vijayan	Raayan	
2024 (13th)	Keerthy Suresh	Raghu Thatha	
2024 (13th)	Manju Warrier	Viduthalai Part 2	
2024 (13th)	Parvathy Thiruvothu	Thangalaan	
2024 (13th)	Urvashi	J Baby	
2025 (14th)	Simran ‡	Tourist Family	
2025 (14th)	Bhagyashri Borse	Kaantha	
2025 (14th)	Keerthy Suresh	Revolver Rita	
2025 (14th)	Nithya Menen	Kadhalikka Neramillai	
2025 (14th)	Mamitha Baiju	Dude	
2025 (14th)	Geetha Kailasam	Angammal	

== See also ==
- SIIMA Critics Award for Best Actress – Tamil
- SIIMA Award for Best Female Debut – Tamil
