= SIIMA Critics Award for Best Actress – Tamil =

Tamil-language media award

- Awarded for: Best Performance by an Actress in a Leading Role in Tamil cinema
- Country: India
- Presented by: Vibri Media Group
- First award: 21 June 2012 (for films released in 2011)
- Most recent winner: Bhagyashri Borse, Kaantha (2025)

Highlights
- Most wins: Aishwarya Rajesh (2)

SIIMA Critics Award for Best Actress – Tamil is presented by Vibri media group as part of its annual South Indian International Movie Awards, for the best actress in a Tamil film, selected by a jury. The award was first given in 2012 for films released in 2011.

== Superlatives ==
Categories	Recipient	Notes
Most wins	Aishwarya Rajesh	2
Oldest winner	Aishwarya Rai Bachchan	Age 50
Youngest winner	Amala Paul	Age 24

- Aishwarya Rajesh is the only actress to have also won the SIIMA Award for Best Actress – Tamil.

== Winners ==
Year	Actress	Film	Ref.
2011	Richa Gangopadhyay	Mayakkam Enna	
2012	Kajal Aggarwal	Thuppakki	
2013	Parvathy	Mariyaan	
2014	Amala Paul	Velaiyilla Pattathari	
2015	Nithya Menen	O Kadhal Kanmani	
2016	Varalaxmi Sarathkumar	Tharai Thappattai	
2017	Aditi Balan	Aruvi	
2018	Aishwarya Rajesh	Kanaa	
2019	Manju Warrier	Asuran	
2020	Aparna Balamurali	Soorarai Pottru	
2021	Aishwarya Rajesh	Thittam Irandu	
2022	Keerthy Suresh	Saani Kaayidham	
2023	Aishwarya Rai Bachchan	Ponniyin Selvan: II	
2024	Dushara Vijayan	Raayan	
2025	Bhagyashri Borse	Kaantha	

== See also ==
- SIIMA Award for Best Actress – Tamil
- SIIMA Award for Best Female Debut – Tamil
