= Natchathiram (disambiguation) =

Natchathiram is a 1980 Indian film.

Natchathiram may also refer to:

- Agni Natchathiram, 1988 Indian film
- Natchathiram Nagargiradhu, 2022 Indian film
