= SIIMA Award for Best Female Debut – Tamil =

Tamil film female debut award

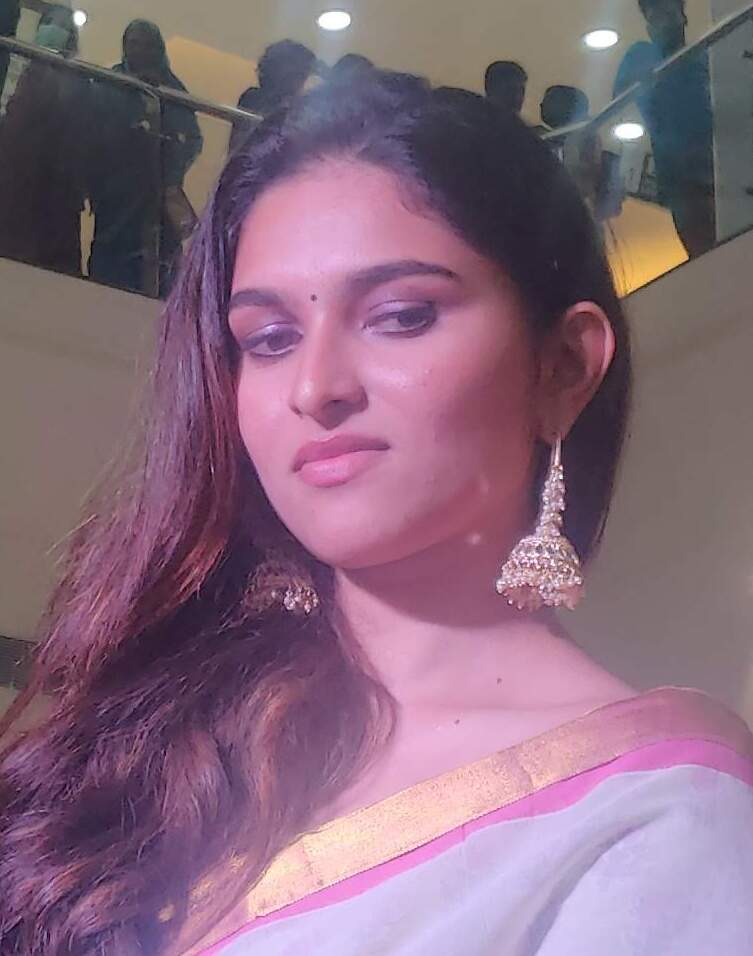
- The 2026 recipient: Kayadu Lohar
- Description: Best Debut Performance by an Actress in a Leading Role in Tamil cinema
- Country: India
- Presented by: Vibri Media Group
- First award: 22 June 2012 (for films released in 2011)
- Most recent winner: Kayadu Lohar, Dragon (2025)

SIIMA Award for Best Female Debut – Tamil is presented by Vibri media group as part of its annual South Indian International Movie Awards, for the best acting done by a female actor in a leading role in her debut Tamil film. The award was first given in 2012 for films released in 2011.

== Superlatives ==
Categories	Recipient	Notes
Oldest winner	Ritu Varma	Age 30
Youngest winner	Lakshmi Menon	Age 17

== Winners and nominees ==
Year	Actress	Film	Ref.
2011 (1st)	Hansika Motwani	Mappillai	
2012 (2nd)	Lakshmi Menon	Sundarapandian	
2012 (2nd)	Varalaxmi Sarathkumar	Podaa Podi	
2012 (2nd)	Manasi Parekh	Leelai	
2012 (2nd)	Pooja Hegde	Mugamoodi	
2012 (2nd)	Urmila Mahanta	Vazhakku Enn 18/9	
2013 (3rd)
2013 (3rd)	Sri Divya	Varuthapadatha Valibar Sangam	
2013 (3rd)	Nazriya Nazim	Neram	
2013 (3rd)	Thulasi Nair	Kadal	
2013 (3rd)	Aishwarya Arjun	Pattathu Yaanai	
2013 (3rd)	Surbhi	Ivan Veramathiri	
2014 (4th)
2014 (4th)	Catherine Tresa	Madras	
2014 (4th)	Prayaga	Pisaasu	
2014 (4th)	Sonakshi Sinha	Lingaa	
2014 (4th)	Ishaara Nair	Sathuranga Vettai	
2014 (4th)	Malavika Nair	Cuckoo	
2015 (5th)
2015 (5th)	Keerthy Suresh	Idhu Enna Maayam	
2015 (5th)	Amyra Dastur	Anegan	
2015 (5th)	Deepa Sannidhi	Enakkul Oruvan	
2015 (5th)	Radhika Prasidhha	Kuttram Kadithal	
2015 (5th)	Sushma Raj	India Pakistan	
2016 (6th)
2016 (6th)	Ritika Singh	Irudhi Suttru	
2016 (6th)	Madonna Sebastian	Kadhalum Kadandhu Pogum	
2016 (6th)	Manjima Mohan	Achcham Yenbadhu Madamaiyada	
2016 (6th)	Nikhila Vimal	Kidaari	
2016 (6th)	Wamiqa Gabbi	Maalai Nerathu Mayakkam	
2017 (7th)
2017 (7th)	Aditi Rao Hydari	Kaatru Veliyidai	
2017 (7th)	Aditi Balan	Aruvi	
2017 (7th)	Priya Bhavani Shankar	Meyaadha Maan	
2017 (7th)	Sayyeshaa	Vanamagan	
2017 (7th)	Shraddha Srinath	Vikram Vedha	
2018 (8th)
2018 (8th)	Raiza Wilson	Pyaar Prema Kaadhal	
2018 (8th)	Amritha Aiyer	Padaiveeran	
2018 (8th)	Ditya	Lakshmi	
2018 (8th)	Gouri G. Kishan	'96	
2018 (8th)	Ivana	Naachiyaar	
2019 (9th)
2019 (9th)	Anagha	Natpe Thunai	
2019 (9th)	Mirnalini Ravi	Champion	
2019 (9th)	Lovelyn Chandrasekhar	House Owner	
2019 (9th)	Banita Sandhu	Adithya Varma	
2019 (9th)	Tanya Hope	Thadam	
2020 (9th)
2020 (9th)	Ritu Varma	Kannum Kannum Kollaiyadithaal	
2020 (9th)	Riya Suman	Seeru	
2020 (9th)	Nattasha Singh	Gypsy	
2020 (9th)	Niranjani Ahathian	Kannum Kannum Kollaiyadithaal	
2020 (9th)	Chaya Devi	Kanni Maadam	
2021 (10th)
2021 (10th)	Priyanka Mohan	Doctor	
2021 (10th)	Dushara Vijayan	Sarpatta Parambarai	
2021 (10th)	Malavika Mohanan	Master	
2021 (10th)	Rajisha Vijayan	Karnan	
2021 (10th)	Abarnathi	Thaen	
2022 (11th)	Aditi Shankar	Viruman	
2022 (11th)	Anukreethy Vas	DSP	
2022 (11th)	Meetha Raghunath	Sarpatta Parambarai	
2022 (11th)	Meetha Raghunath	Mudhal Nee Mudivum Nee	
2022 (11th)	Brigida Saga	Iravin Nizhal	
2022 (11th)	Siddhi Idnani	Vendhu Thanindhathu Kaadu	
2023 (12th)	Preethi Asrani	Ayothi	
2023 (12th)	Malavika Manoj	Joe	
2023 (12th)	Monisha Mohan Menon	Fight Club	
2023 (12th)	Naksha Saran	Margazhi Thingal	
2023 (12th)	Nimisha Sajayan	Chithha	
2023 (12th)	Saniya Iyappan	Irugapatru	
2024 (13th)	Sri Gouri Priya	Lover	
2024 (13th)	Mamitha Baiju	Rebel	
2024 (13th)	Anna Ben	Kottukkaali	
2024 (13th)	Preity Mukhundhan	Star	
2024 (13th)	Rajisha Vijayan	Karnan	
2024 (13th)	Sanjana Krishnamoorthy	Lubber Pandhu	
2025 (14th)	Kayadu Lohar	Dragon	
2025 (14th)	Anishma Anilkumar	Sirai	
2025 (14th)	Aarsha Chandini Baiju	House Mates	
2025 (14th)	Yogalakshmi	Tourist Family	
2025 (14th)	Anjali Sivaraman	Bad Girl	
2025 (14th)	Saanve Megghana	Kudumbasthan	

== See also ==
- SIIMA Award for Best Actress – Tamil
- SIIMA Critics Award for Best Actress – Tamil
