= With Love (2026 film) =

2026 Indian film by Madhan

- Theatrical release poster
- Directed by: Madhan
- Written by: Madhan
- Produced by: Soundarya Rajinikanth; Pasilian Nazerath; Magesh Raj Pasilian
- Starring: Abishan Jeevinth; Anaswara Rajan
- Cinematography: Shreyaas Krishna
- Edited by: Suresh Kumar
- Music by: Sean Roldan
- Production companies: Zion Films; MRP Entertainment
- Release dates: 3 February 2026 (Chennai); 6 February 2026 (India)
- Running time: 140 minutes
- Country: India
- Language: Tamil
- Budget: est. ₹4 crore
- Box office: est. ₹39 crore

With Love is a 2026 Indian Tamil-language teen romantic comedy film written and directed by Madhan. It is produced by Soundarya Rajinikanth, Pasilian Nazerath, and Magesh Raj Pasilian under the banners of Zion Films and MRP Entertainment. The film stars Abishan Jeevinth and Anaswara Rajan in the lead roles. It marks the directorial debut of Madhan and Abishan's debut as a lead actor.

The film was officially announced in August 2025 under the tentative title Production No. 4, as it was the fourth venture of MRP Entertainment, with the official title announced in November 2025. Principal photography was completed in October 2025 within 35 working days. Filming took place in Chennai and Tiruchirappalli. The film features music composed by Sean Roldan, cinematography by Shreyaas Krishna, and editing by Suresh Kumar.

With Love premiered in Chennai on 3 February 2026 and was released theatrically across India on 6 February 2026. The film received positive reviews from critics and was a commercial success at the box office.

== Plot ==
Sathya Seelan, a designer who avoids marriage proposals, is forced by his sister into an arranged marriage proposal with a girl named "Monisha". Their conversation was awkward at first, but when Monisha realized that Sathya was her Senior, their conversation takes a turn.

Sathya shares his past with Monisha, recalling his school days with his friend Dinesh and his one-sided love for their classmate Anisha. Out of infatuation over her, Sathya once submitted a blank exam paper when she was absent and was punished by their teacher, Swaminathan sir. Though he plans to confess his feelings on Anisha's birthday, he fails to do so. On the school annual day, he decides to confess, but Dinesh reveals that Anisha is already in a relationship with him, leaving Sathya heartbroken and putting an end to their friendship. He stopped talking to both Anisha and Dinesh.

Monisha then recounts her own past during her 10th-grade years at the same school, where she studied with her friends Vinu and Sandhya. A backbencher who often gets in trouble and stays in the school hostel, Monisha once involved Balaji, the class topper, in passing a note during an exam, which led to him being punished when he refused to reveal her identity. Over time, she develops feelings for him and joins his tuition centre to grow closer. Despite intending to confess her feelings, she hesitates and instead asks him if he studied for their upcoming speed test. An incident later damages their relationship when Monisha confides to her friends about Balaji running away after seeing the seniors fight and it becomes a joke among the class, leading to Balaji being mocked by classmates. Hurt and angered, he distances himself from her. Monisha beats up Sandhya and they stop talking to each other because Sandhya was the one who mocked Balaji the most. Before the academic year ends, Monisha attempts to reconcile by giving him a slam book, but Monisha leaving before he could give the slam book prevents them from resolving their differences.

After sharing their stories, Monisha suggests that before committing to each other, they should seek closure with their past relationships and feelings. Sathya agrees, and the two begin planning to reconnect with Anisha and Balaji. They contact Dinesh, who informs them that Anisha is married and living abroad but promises to obtain her contact details.

As part of their search for Balaji, Sathya and Monisha travel to Tiruchirappalli for their acquaintance Santhosh's wedding. During this trip, Monisha reveals a past incident involving Sandhya and Santhosh, which led to a misunderstanding with their teacher Swaminathan sir. In the ensuing conflict, Sathya had once slapped the teacher. Encouraged by Monisha, Sathya later apologises to Swaminathan sir, and they reconcile.

Meanwhile, Sathya receives a follow request on Instagram from an anonymous user who also follows Monisha. Although curious, Sathya is unable to learn much as Monisha avoids discussing it. His insecurity leads him to check her phone without permission, where he finds that she referred to him as her "would-be." Upon discovering this breach of trust, Monisha confronts Sathya and asks him to leave. Later, after attending an after-party and reconciling while intoxicated, they share an intimate moment.

The next day, Monisha dismisses the previous night as a consequence of intoxication. The two visit their former school, where they meet Jaffer, a junior of Sathya, who helps them locate Anisha, who is temporarily back in India. Sathya meets Anisha and confesses his past feelings, and the two reconcile as friends, gaining closure.

That night, Sathya learns that the anonymous Instagram user is Balaji. The following day, Sathya and Monisha meet him. During the meeting, Sathya briefly steps away and later sees Balaji hugging Monisha. Misinterpreting the situation as a relationship between them, he leaves without confronting either of them.

Distressed, Sathya drunkenly calls Dinesh, expressing despair. Concerned, Dinesh, along with Jaffer, Santhosh, Anisha, and Sathya's sister gathers at his house the next morning. Balaji also arrives and clarifies that he had confessed his feelings to Monisha, but she rejected him, stating that she no longer reciprocates his feelings and wishes to be with Sathya.

Realising his misunderstanding, Sathya rushes to meet Monisha. Monisha initially was angry at him, but after repeated apologies from Sathya, the two reconcile, resolving their differences and choosing to move forward together.

== Cast ==
- Abishan Jeevinth as Sathya Seelan
- Anaswara Rajan as Monisha
- Kavya Anil as Anisha, Sathya's former love interest
- Sachin Nachiappan as Balaji, Monisha's former love interest
- Harish Kumar as Dinesh, Sathya's friend
- Saravanan as Swaminathan, a school teacher
- Theni Murugan as Sathya's father
- Rajapandi as a parent
- Sachana Namidass as Sandhya, Monisha's school friend
- Sanjay Mohan as Santhosh, Sandhya’s ex-boyfriend
- RJ Dimple Kanna as Vinu, Monisha's school friend
- RJ Ananthi as Sathya's sister
- Nagaichuvaigal Adhiyamaan as Sathya's friend
- Nagaichuvaigal Vetri as Sathya's friend
- Ayaz Khan as James
- Sudarshan Gandhi as Sathya's brother-in-law
- M. Sasikumar as Das (cameo appearance; from Tourist Family)
- Kamalesh Jagan as Mulli (cameo appearance; from Tourist Family)
- Madhan as a school student and Monisha's fan (cameo appearance)

== Production ==
After the success of Abishan Jeevinth's directorial debut Tourist Family (2025), he was announced in late August 2025 to make his debut as lead actor in a film jointly produced by Pasilian Nazerath and Magesh Raj Pasilian under MRP Entertainment, along with Soundarya Rajinikanth under her banner Zion Films. The film marks the directorial debut of Madhan, who previously worked as an associate director on films such as Lover (2024) and Tourist Family. The project marks Abishan's second collaboration with MRP Entertainment following Tourist Family. Tentatively titled Production No. 4, it represents the company's fourth production venture. Soundarya also served as the film's presenter. The film stars Anaswara Rajan as the female lead.

Principal photography took place across Chennai and Tiruchirappalli in a single schedule spanning 35 days, and was wrapped on 13 October 2025. Post-production commenced in early November 2025, with Abishan Jeevinth and Anaswara Rajan beginning dubbing for their portions. The film was later officially titled With Love, with the title teaser released by Soundarya Rajinikanth's father, actor Rajinikanth, on 21 November 2025.

== Music ==
With Love

Soundtrack album by Sean Roldan
- Genre: Film soundtrack
- Language: Tamil
- Label: Sony Music India
- Producer: Sean Roldan

Sean Roldan chronology
Revolver Rita (2025)	With Love (2026)	My Lord (2026)

Singles from With Love
- 1. "Aiyo Kadhaley" Released: 22 December 2025; 2. "Marandhu Poche" Released: 13 January 2026

The soundtrack and background score were composed by Sean Roldan, marking his second collaboration with Abishan Jeevinth after Tourist Family. The first single, "Aiyo Kadhaley", was released on 22 December 2025, followed by the second single, "Marandhu Poche", on 13 January 2026.

Track listing (Tamil)
No.	Title	Lyrics	Singer(s)	Length
1.	"Aiyo Kadhaley"	Mohan Rajan	Vijaynarain	3:26
2.	"Marandhu Poche"	Madhan	Adithya RK	3:17
3.	"Morattu Muttal"	Mohan Rajan	Sean Roldan	2:46
4.	"Ennai Polave"	Uma Devi	Sublahshini	3:25
5.	"Edhukku Dhan Indha Kaadhal"	Mohan Rajan	Yuvan Shankar Raja	4:29
6.	"Start With Love"			0:57
7.	"Kaadhal Kadhai"	Mohan Rajan	Manoj Krishna, Sushmitha Narasimhan	1:22
8.	"Anisha Theme"		Sean Roldan	2:05
9.	"Would Be"		Shibi Srinivasan, Sean Roldan	1:36
Total length:				23:00

All tracks are written by Sanare.

Track listing (Telugu)
No.	Title	Singer(s)	Length
1.	"Ayyo Kadhaley"	Vijaynarain	3:26
2.	"Merisi Poye"	Sarath Santhosh	3:17
3.	"Naakem Thakkuva"	M. S. Krishna	2:46
4.	"Ayyo Kadhaley (Female version)"	Sublahshini	3:25
5.	"Marachipovaali Manasaa"	Deepak Blue	4:29
6.	"Start With Love"		0:57
7.	"Preme Varam"	Manoj Krishna, Sushmitha Narasimhan	1:22
8.	"Anisha Theme"	Manoj Krishna	2:05
9.	"Yesei Raa Yesei Raa"	Shibi Srinivasan	1:36
Total length:			18:00

In addition to the original soundtrack, the song "Aval Varuvala", composed by Deva for the 1997 film Nerrukku Ner, is reused in the Tamil version of the film.

== Marketing ==
In early February, the makers conducted a drone show in Edward Elliot's Beach, the first of its kind in Tamil cinema, to promote the film.

== Release ==
=== Theatrical ===
With Love premiered at Sathyam Cinemas on 3 February 2026. The film was released theatrically on 6 February 2026. The overseas distribution rights of the film were acquired by Ahimsa Entertainment.

=== Home media ===
The post-theatrical digital and satellite rights were acquired by Netflix and Vijay Television respectively.

== Reception ==
=== Critical response ===
Yashaswini Sri of The Indian Express gave 4/5 stars and wrote "With Love is the kind of film that won’t blow you away with spectacle, but it will sit quietly in your chest for days afterward." Avinash Ramachandran of Cinema Express gave 3/5 stars and wrote "Powered by convincing performances, With Love reins in the urge to be just another launch vehicle, and ends up finding magic in the chaos of love". Roopa Radhakrishnan of The Times of India gave 3/5 stars and wrote "With Love works far better when the interactions and one-liner jokes are character-specific rather than when it resorts to being overly generalised. With Love doesn't reinvent the genre. It follows a conventional pattern but finds the charm in its likeable lead performances, Sean Roldan’s vibrant music and a lovely supporting cast."

Anusha Sundar of OTTPlay gave 2.5/5 stars and wrote "With Love is a film that is as casual and breezy as it gets. It has the ingredients of a romantic drama, even if the proportions are a little high or low at times." K Janani of India Today gave 2.5 out of 5 stars and wrote "With Love scores big in interconnecting the stories of Abishan and Anaswara well, but it lacks the cohesiveness to emerge as a fully satisfying romantic drama." Bhuvanesh Chandar of The Hindu wrote "Though written with a lot of heart and a conviction to make a simple and sweet meet-cute, debutant Madhan’s film ends up as a middling rom-com that lacks inner scaffolding". Kirubhakar Purushothaman of The Federal and Vishal Menon of The Hollywood Reporter India also reviewed the film.

=== Box office ===
The film reportedly grossed around ₹11 crore (US$1.1 million) within the first three days of its release. Shortly thereafter, a meet was held by the film's makers to celebrate its success, which was attended by Rajinikanth who congratulated them. Soundarya described the occasion as an emotional and "priceless" moment, sharing images and videos from the meet on social media. The film, made on a budget of around ₹4 crore (US$420,000), grossed an estimated ₹39 crore (US$4.0 million) in its lifetime.
