= Seyon (film) =

2027 Indian film by Sivakumar Murugesan

- Teaser poster
- Directed by: Sivakumar Murugesan
- Written by: Sivakumar Murugesan
- Produced by: Kamal Haasan; R. Mahendran
- Starring: Sivakarthikeyan; Bhagyashri Borse
- Cinematography: Vidhu Ayyanna
- Edited by: San Lokesh
- Music by: Santhosh Narayanan
- Production companies: Raaj Kamal Films International; Turmeric Media
- Country: India
- Language: Tamil
- Budget: ₹35 crore

Seyon is an upcoming Indian Tamil-language action drama film written and directed by Sivakumar Murugesan. Produced by Kamal Haasan and R. Mahendran's Raaj Kamal Films International with Turmeric Media, the film stars Sivakarthikeyan and Bhagyashri Borse in the lead roles, alongside Raj B. Shetty, Bala Saravanan, Aruldoss, Singampuli, Raichal Rabecca and Seeman.

The film, marking the second collaboration between Sivakarthikeyan and RKFI after Amaran (2024), was officially announced in February 2026 under the tentative title SK26, as it is Sivakarthikeyan's 26th film as a lead actor, and the official title was announced a few days later. Principal photography has been taking place since May 2026, predominantly in Madurai. The film has music composed by Santhosh Narayanan, cinematography by Vidhu Ayyanna and editing by San Lokesh.

== Cast ==
- Sivakarthikeyan
- Bhagyashri Borse
- Raj B. Shetty
- Bala Saravanan
- Aruldoss as a police officer
- Singampuli
- Raichal Rabecca
- Seeman

== Production ==
=== Development ===
During the production of Thaai Kizhavi (2026), director Karthik Venugopal introduced the film's director, Sivakumar Murugesan to Sivakarthikeyan. Sivakarthikeyan subsequently became involved as a producer of Thaai Kizhavi through Sivakarthikeyan Productions, alongside Sudhan Sundaram's Passion Studios. Murugesan had narrated a script to the actor during this period, which impressed him. At the Thaai Kizhavi pre-release event in February 2026, Sivakarthikeyan announced that he would collaborate with Murugesan.

On 15 February, Raaj Kamal Films International (RKFI) announced that Kamal Haasan would produce Sivakarthikeyan's 26th film, then referred to as SK26, with R. Mahendran and Tumeric Media involved. However, RKFI did not officially identify the director. One day after, the project was formally revealed as Seyon. RKFI announced Sivakumar Murugesan as the writer and director, Santhosh Narayanan as music composer, Vivek Vijayakumar as cinematographer and San Lokesh as editor. The production described the film as a rural commercial entertainer combining rooted emotions, mass appeal and family entertainment. It was the second collaboration between Sivakarthikeyan and RKFI after Amaran (2024). The film reportedly has a budget of approximately ₹35 crore (US$3.7 million), which included Sivakarthikeyan's advance of ₹10 crore (US$1.1 million) with the reminder of his remuneration structured as a profit sharing arrangement. He was reportedly set to receive 70% of the film's profit, with RKFI retaining the remaining 30%.

=== Pre-production ===
Murugesan retained a few from the technical crew of Thaai Kizhavi, including cinematographer Vivek Vijayakumar and editor San Lokesh. The crew also consisted of action choreographer Supreme Sundar, art director R. K. Nagu, costume designers Keerthy Sampath and Joshua Maxwell J, publicity designer Tuney John of 24AM and executive producers Arun Karunanidhi and Muthuramalingam. In August, however, Vivek Vijayakumar was replaced by Vidhu Ayyanna as cinematographer. In August, choreographer Shobi announced being part of the film, while stunt duo Anbariv also joined the same month.

=== Casting ===
Bhagyashri Borse was announced as the female lead in May 2026. It is her second Tamil film after Kaantha (2025). Bala Saravanan was announced as part of the cast during the early production announcements. Aruldoss was also announced as part of the cast. The promotional footage showed him as a police officer. Raj B. Shetty joined the cast later, marking his Tamil debut. He was described as playing an important role. On 8 September 2026, RKFI announced Seeman as a new cast member. This is Seeman's first collaboration with Sivakarthikeyan. Singampuli and Raichal Rabecca are also part of the cast. Saravanan, Aruldoss, Singampuli and Rabecca were also a part of Murugesan's Thaai Kizhavi.

=== Filming ===
In March 2026, Sivakarthikeyan said that principal photography would begin the following month, i.e. April. However, filming ultimately did not begin that month. Principal photography officially began on 18 May 2026. The production entered filming with a traditional puja ceremony in Madurai, with RKFI announcing that the film had gone on floors. Reports indicated that the first leg of filming would span 28 days across Madurai. The film's rural setting and its connection to the Virumaandi / Murugan worship tradition made the Madurai region particularly important to the production. Bhagyashri began filming her portions in late May. The following month, a song shoot was held in Kadavur, Madurai. The sequence reportedly featured around 1,500 dancers. The schedule was completed on 10 June. The second schedule returned to Madurai. By 10 August, Sivakarthikeyan was reported to be heading back to Madurai for the next phase. This schedule was expected to contain multiple action blocks involving Sivakarthikeyan. On 11 September, RKFI announced that the second production schedule had been completed. By early November, filming was occurring at Madurai, and Sivakarthikeyan revealed that 70% of filming was complete.

=== Post-production ===
San Lokesh has been attached as editor. He also edited Thaai Kizhavi.

== Music ==
The soundtrack is composed by Santhosh Narayanan, in his first collaboration with Sivakarthikeyan and Sivakumar. "Vaaran Vaaran Paru Virumaandi" was the track featured in the promotional teaser released on 17 February 2026.

No.	Title	Lyrics	Singer(s)	Length
1.	"Vaaran Vaaran Paru Virumaandi"	Karumathur Manimaaran	Santhosh Narayanan	3:30

== Marketing ==
The first look poster was released on 16 February 2026, confirming the film's title. A day after, on the occasion of Sivakarthikeyan's birthday, a promotional teaser was released which confirmed the October 2026 release.

== Release ==
=== Theatrical ===
Seyon was scheduled to be theatrically released in October 2026 worldwide. The release window was confirmed by Sivakarthikeyan on his birthday, 17 February 2026. However, the date was not met as filming has yet to be completed as of November.

=== Distribution ===
The overseas rights were acquired by Home Screen Entertainment and AP International.

== Controversies ==
The film's title became the subject of an industry dispute following its announcement. A complaint was reportedly lodged with the Tamil Film Producers Council by Double Meaning Productions, which claimed prior rights to the title Seyon for a proposed sequel to its 2022 film Maayon. The complainants argued that the title had already been reserved for their project, prompting a review of registration records by the producers' body. In response, the makers of Seyon maintained that their film's title was independently chosen and associated with the cultural and devotional reference to Lord Murugan.
