= Aneethi =

- Theatrical release poster
- Directed by: G. Vasanthabalan
- Written by: G. Vasanthabalan
- Produced by: M. Krishna Kumar See; Murugan Gnanavel; Varadharajan Manickam; Vasanthabalan
- Starring: Arjun Das; Dushara Vijayan
- Cinematography: A. M. Edwin Sakay
- Edited by: Ravikumar. M
- Music by: G. V. Prakash Kumar
- Production company: Urban Boyz Studios
- Distributed by: S Pictures
- Release date: 21 July 2023
- Country: India
- Language: Tamil
- Budget: ₹ 5 crore

Aneethi (transl. Injustice) is a 2023 Indian Tamil-language psychological romantic thriller film written and directed by G. Vasanthabalan. It is produced by Vasanthabalan himself, V M. Krishna Kumar, Murugan Gnanavel and Varadharajan Manickam under the banner of Urban Boyz Studios. The film stars Arjun Das and Dushara Vijayan in the lead roles.

The film was announced in February 2021, under the tentative title Production No.1, as it is the production banner's maiden production, while the title of the film was revealed in September. Principal photography commenced in February 2021 and wrapped in May 2022. The music is composed by G. V. Prakash Kumar, while the cinematography and editing are handled by A. M. Edwin Sakay and Ravikumar M, respectively.

Aneethi was released theatrically on 21 July 2023 and received positive reviews from critics and became a sleeper hit at the box-office.

== Plot ==
The film opens with Thirumeni entering a house, holding a pickaxe, and searching for Subbu.

A year earlier: Thiru works as a food deliveryman at Meal Monkey. He shares a room with his friend Pothi and roommate Bhaskar. When Thiru goes to deliver food, the customer asks him to come to the 13th floor. He climbs up the stairs, but the customer argues with him because he does not have change for ₹ 2,000. Thiru kills the customer with a sangu.

The next morning, Thiru sees a chocolate advertisement on TV, becomes furious, and breaks the TV set. Bhaskar scolds him for doing this. Later, it is revealed that Thiru has OCD and is treated by a psychiatrist. Also, the 13th-floor customer was not killed; Thiru hallucinated. After finishing his session with the psychiatrist, Thiru leaves the hospital.

Later that day, when Thiru returns home, Pothi and Bhaskar ask him about being treated in a mental health hospital. He tells them that nowadays, he feels like killing whoever he sees. Pothi asks him if he has ever wanted to kill him, and Thiru replies that he has killed him a 100 times in his imagination. Bhaskar asks the same question to Thiru, and he replies that he has killed him 1,000 times. A frightened Pothi and Bhaskar sleep outside the room that night.

Later, the manager blocks Thiru's Meal Monkey account due to low ratings. Pothi requests that the manager give Thiru one last chance. One night, while Thiru is delivering food, he talks to a girl, Subbu, but cannot see her because she has not opened the gate. He likes her, so he starts to deliver the food she orders every day. To see Subbu's face, he packs the food in a big parcel container so she will open the gate and he can see her, which works out. Later, Thiru follows Subbu, who is a maid for Mangayarkarasi. He leaves the store after Mangayarkarasi scolds and beats her.

After receiving her food, Subbu asks Thiru to forgive her for not telling him that she is a maid. He tells her he knows she is a maid before following her to the store. Soon, they both became lovers. After a few days, when Subbu leaves the house, Mangayarkarasi checks her bag and then her body. A frustrated Subbu cries and lifts her clothes. Mangayarkarasi beats Subbu, and Thiru sees this through the window. While going to her house, he says that he wants to kill Mangayarkarasi.

Later that day, while talking about Subbu's family issues, Thiru and Subbu hug, and Mangayarkarasi witnesses this. They start arguing, and Thiru leaves. Later that night, Subbu calls him, and they both take Mangayarkarasi to the hospital, but she is already dead. Subbu tries to call Mangayarkarasi's son Aji. He does not pick up the call, so they put the dead body in a private mortuary and use Mangayarkarasi's debit card for the expenses.

Later, Pothi is in an accident, and Thiru rescues him and takes him to a private hospital. He asks for Mangayarkarasi's debit card to pay the bill and tells Subbu he will return the money. Subbu refuses to give the debit card, so Thiru ends the phone call, and an auto driver helps him pay the bill. The next day, she says her brother stole the card and swiped ₹2 lakh. They decide to raise the money by asking people they know for loans, but no one helps them. Aji returns Subbu's call and lies to him that Mangayarkarasi wanted to talk to him.

Later, Thiru arranges for a mimicry artist to talk with Mangayarkarasi's daughter Anitha. The mimicry artist imitates like Mangayarkarasi, and Anitha tells her that she has a surprise gift for her, so she asks Subbu to open the gate. After opening the gate, Subbu is frightened to see Anitha and Aji, and their families, who have come here to see Mangayarkarasi.

The siblings find that their mother is dead, and they start beating Subbu and Thiru. They see their mother's dead body, and it is confirmed that she died due to poisoning. The police arrest Thiru and Subbu. Anitha goes to the police station and starts to shoot them with her gun, but they escape. Anitha's uncle bribed the police to cover the incident.

The police start investigating by beating both Thiru and Subbu. After the inspector manipulates Subbu by telling her that Thiru may have killed Mangayarkarasi, Subbu recollects the conversation and Thiru's mental illness, so she concludes that he must be the killer. She yells at Thiru for killing Mangayarkarasi. Later, the police start torturing Thiru and inform Bhaskar that Thiru has killed an old lady. They find the note of Thiru, in which it is written many times that the taste of chocolate is bitter.

Many years ago: Thiru and his father lived happily. His father works at a small store, and his salary is ₹ 500, but the store owner will only pay ₹ 300. One day, Thiru asked his father to buy him chocolate, which costs ₹ 50. His father promises to buy it on Thiru's birthday. Unfortunately, the father is beaten up and humiliated by the store owner and his employer. The owner makes a false complaint to the police that Thiru's father tried to steal the money, so the police beat him up. Later that night, Thiru's father returns home and gives his son the chocolate, which was covered in his blood. Seeing this, Thiru tells him that he does not want the chocolate and only wants his father. That night, Thiru's father dies of suffocation in his sleep. After a few days, Thiru hallucinates throwing a stone at the store owner's face.

In the present: Thiru confesses that he killed Mangayarkarasi while being filmed by the police. The cameraman finds a letter that Mangayarkarasi wrote. It reveals that she killed herself by consuming sleeping pills because Aji and Anitha did not care about her. After this, Subbu and Thiru are released from prison. Subbu asks Thiru to forgive her, but he walks away.

Anitha's uncle gives ₹4 lakh to Subbu's father so he can let her go with them to America and work as a waitress at their hotel. Thiru goes to his room but cannot find the key, and his belongings are thrown out. He finds his father's photo in the room, which was damaged by rain. Subbu realises that Aji and Anitha want to get her signature because Mangayarkarasi has registered the house in her name. She leaves the place because she does not want to go to America. Bhaskar arrives at the room and finds that the lock has been broken. As he enters the room, he finds Thiru taking a bath without locking the bathroom door.

At the same time, the Meal Monkey employees protest against his layoff. Subbu arrives at the Meal Monkey office to find Thiru, but cannot find him and leaves. After finishing his bath, Thiru asks Bhaskar to forgive him for breaking the lock, and he cries because the photo of his father has been damaged. He leaves, saying that he has vacated the room. After he leaves, it is shown that Bhaskar was killed after the TV hit his head. Thiru takes Bhaskar's bike, rides it to the Meal Monkey office, and kills the company owner. Anitha and Aji find Subbu, take her to their home, and start torturing her. When Thiru arrives, he becomes more aggressive, seeing Subbu kneeling and begging to let her go, which reminds him of his father. He thrashes and kills Aji, Anitha, and their uncle.

Finally, Thiru confronts Subbu, where she kneels, begs, and asks him to kill her. She says that she is the reason for his becoming a killer. He drops the axe, kisses her hands, and says that he loves her hands very much and will always love them. He says that those who kneel and ask for an apology should be forgiven. If they did not forgive, then they were not humans but beasts. If the store owner had forgiven his father, his life might have been different and happier.

When Thiru opens the gate, he has a hallucination in which he sees his father on a bicycle and asks why his clothes are dirty. Thiru replies that it is just for play. Thiru's father tells his son that the latter's name (Thiru) means pure, both mentally and physically.

== Cast ==
- Arjun Das as Thirumeni (Thiru)
- Dushara Vijayan as Subbulakshmi (Subbu), Thiru's love interest and Mangayarkarasi's housemaid
- Kaali Venkat as Thiru's father
- Bharani as Pothi, Thiru's colleague
- Shah Ra as Bhaskar, Thiru's colleague
- Arjun Chidambaram as Aji, Mangayarkarasi's son
- Vanitha Vijayakumar as Anitha, Mangayarkarasi's daughter
- Shanta Dhananjayan as Mangayarkarasi
- Suresh Chakravarthi as Aji’s father-in-law
- T. Siva
- J. Satish Kumar as Inspector Chandrasekar
- Aranthangi Nisha as Kalaimamani Nisha
- Subramaniam Siva
- Arun Vaidyanathan

== Production ==
=== Development ===
In early January 2021, Vasanthabalan was reported to collaborate with Arjun Das for his next directional. An official confirmation was made on 12 February. The film would be produced by Vasanthabalan himself and his school friends under Urban Boyz Studio, in their maiden production, with a production budget of ₹5 crore (US$520,000).

The day after the confirmation, Dushara Vijayan was announced to play the lead female role. During an interview, she stated "While I was shooting for Ranjith's film Sarpatta Parambarai (2021), Vasantabalan sir had come to see Shankar sir, who was shooting for Indian 2 at a spot nearby. He saw me and asked me to come to the office. I had a look test with Arjun and got the role."

G. V. Prakash Kumar, who made his composition debut through Vasanthabalan's directional film Veyil (2006), was announced to compose the score.

A muhurat puja was held on 18 February in Chennai. Stills shared by the makers confirmed that the cinematography and editing would be handled by A. M. Edwin Sakay and Ravikumar M, respectively, as they were present at the puja. The film was reported to be a remake of The Lift Boy (2019); however, Vasanthabalan denied the reports.

On 10 September, on the occasion of Ganesh Chaturthi, the film's title Aneethi was revealed by Sivakarthikeyan and P. C. Sreeram along with a teaser.

=== Filming ===
Principal photography commenced on 18 February 2021. The filming took mostly place in Chennai. Principal photography wrapped by 24 May 2022.

== Music ==
Aneethi

Soundtrack album by G. V. Prakash Kumar
- Released: 8 July 2023
- Recorded: 2021–2023
- Studios: Jehovahson Alghar, Divine Labs
- Genre: Film soundtrack
- Length: 15:19
- Language: Tamil
- Label: Think Music India
- Producer: G. V. Prakash Kumar

G. V. Prakash Kumar chronology
Kathar Basha Endra Muthuramalingam (2023)	Aneethi (2023)	Karumegangal Kalaigindrana (2023)

The music for the film was composed by G. V. Prakash Kumar, in his fourth collaboration with Vasanthabalan after Veyil (2006), Angadi Theru (2010) and Jail (2021); second with Arjun after Putham Pudhu Kaalai Vidiyaadhaa (2022).

The first single "Thikatta Thikatta Kadhalippom" released on 31 October 2022.

Track listing
No.	Title	Lyrics	Singer(s)	Length
1.	"Thikatta Thikatta Kadhalippom"	Na. Muthukumar	G. V. Prakash Kumar, Yamini Ghantasala	4:46
2.	"Thuli Eeram Surakkaadha – Theme song"	Karthik Netha	Harish Sivaramakrishnan	3:30
3.	"Malardhan Vizhundhadhu"	Karthik Netha	Hesham Abdul Wahab, Ravi G	3:50
4.	"Poo Naazhi Pon Naazhi"	Ekadesi	Sid Sriram	3:16

== Release ==
=== Theatrical ===
Aneethi released theatrically on 21 July 2023. Apart from Tamil, it also released with a dubbed Telugu version titled Blood and Chocolate. The distribution rights were acquired by S. Shankar under S Pictures, working with Vasanthabalan for the second time after Veyil.

=== Home media ===
Aneethi was available to stream in Amazon Prime Video and Aha on 15 September 2023.

== Reception ==
Aneethi received positive reviews from critics.

Logesh Balachandran of The Times of India gave the film 3.5/5 and wrote "Vasantha Balan, who is known for making emotionally loaded films, has come up with a well-written, hard-hitting thriller in Aneethi that's quite impressive in many ways." Gopinath Rajendran of The Hindu wrote "Aneethi is miles ahead with its plot and treatment when compared to the director’s previous film, Jail (2021). But it’s a far cry from Vasanthabalan’s earlier works which were more well-rounded and compelling. Despite having its heart in the right place and a lovely performance from Arjun Das, Aneethi, as a whole, is inadequate in pushing home its several messages in an intriguing manner. For a film on injustice, that’s unfair!" Pachi Avudayappan of ABP Nadu gave the film 2.5/5 and wrote "On the whole, 'Aneedhi', which calls for justice for the common man, would have been appreciated if it had increased its pressure through visuals."

Dinamalar gave the film 2.5/5. Kallilullah of Hindutamil.in wrote "'Aneethi' is not likely to do injustice to the audience as it talks about various things like capitalist exploitation and the impact of consumer culture on the common people, but the screenplay is still not without justice."
