= Neha Bam =

Indian film actress

- Born: Neha Bam; Kolhapur, Maharashtra
- Occupation: Actress
- Years active: 1999 – present

Neha Bam is an Indian actress known for her work in television serials such as Kumkum Bhagya, and films like The Dirty Picture.

== Early life & Career ==
She was born and raised in Kolhapur. She began her acting career with Avishkar group on stage while also working as a model, beginning with print ads for pharmaceutical companies. After several years working at colleges she was offered a role in a film and, finding acting more interesting, quit her other job in order to act full-time. In television, she appeared in many serials like Savdhaan India, Kumkum Bhagya, Sukanya Hamari Betiyan etc. In cinema, she worked in a number of movies like The Dirty Picture, The Lift Boy, etc.

== Filmography ==
- The Trases of Sandalwood Spanish (2015)
- Rokk Hindi
- The Dirty Picture Hindi
- Ya Rab Hindi
- Sawariya Hindi
- Raqt Hindi
- Kuch To Gadbad Hai Hindi
- Jo Bole So Nihaal Hindi
- Tum Ho Na Hindi
- Chand Bujh Gaya Hindi
- Ab Tak Chappan Hindi
- Sandhya (2003 film)
- Champion Hindi
- Aap Mujhe Achche Lagne Lage Hindi
- Raaz Hindi
- Nayak Hindi
- Kurukshetra Hindi
- Hu Tu Tu Hindi
- Ratra Arambha Marathi
- Bindhast Marathi
- Tochi Samartha Ek Marathi
- Sanai Chaughade Marathi (2007)
- Vishwas Marathi (2009)
- Rege Marathi (2015)
- Yada Yada Hi Dharmasya Marathi (upcoming)
- Rada Rocks Marathi (2013)
- Tuzi Mazi Love Story Marathi (2014)
- Taptapadi Marathi (2014)
- Bhay Marathi (2015)
- Mantthan Marathi (2015)
- Dulha Milal Dildar Bhojpuri
- Bairi Piya Bhojpuri
- Pinjadevali Muniya Bhojpuri
- The Lift Boy (2019)
- Ateet (2020) as Doctor aunty; released on ZEE5

== Television ==
| Year | Serial | Role | Channel | Notes |
|---|---|---|---|---|
| 1999-2003 | Aabhalmaya | Meera Yerawar | Alpha TV Marathi | |
| 2001 | Jaane Anjaane | Urmila Prannath Vashisht | DD National | |
| 2003 | Kumkum - Ek Pyara Sa Bandhan | Doctor | Star Plus | |
| 2006-2010 | Avaghachi Sansar | Gore Bai | Zee Marathi | |
| 2008 | Kasamh Se | Mrs. Mittal | Zee TV | |
| 2008-09 | Pehchaan | | DD National | |
| 2012-13 | Sukanya Hamari Betiyan | Parvati Verma | DD National | |
| 2012-13 | Kya Hua Tera Vaada | Mrs. Raizada | Sony TV | |
| 2013-15 | Bharat Ka Veer Putra - Maharana Pratap | Dai Kokoi | Sony TV | |
| 2014-15 | Anudamini | | DD National | |
| 2014-15 | Kumkum Bhagya | Mrs. Khanna | Zee TV | |
| 2014-18 | Kaisi Yeh Yaariyan | Navya's mother | MTV, Voot | |
| 2016-20 | Tujhyat Jeev Rangala | Nandita's Mother | Zee Marathi | |
| 2016 | Dahleez | Mrs. Ramkrishnan | StarPlus | |
| 2016 | Krishnadasi | Bhamini Pradyumna Vidyadhar Rao | Colors | |
| 2018 | Ishq Mein Marjawan | Kalyani | Colors | |
| 2018 | Laal Ishq | | And TV | Episode 25 |
| 2024 | Navri Mile Hitlerla | | Zee Marathi | |
