= Bodhai Yeri Budhi Maari =

2019 film directed by Chandru KR

- Theatrical release poster
- Directed by: Chandru KR
- Written by: Chandru KR; Kathir
- Story by: Chandru KR
- Produced by: Sreenidhi Sagar
- Starring: Dheeraj; Pradaini Surva; Radha Ravi; Mime Gopi; Charle; Dushara Vijayan
- Cinematography: Balasubramaniem
- Edited by: V. J. Sabu Joseph
- Music by: KP
- Production company: Rise East Entertainments Pvt Ltd
- Release date: 12 July 2019
- Running time: 124 min
- Country: India
- Language: Tamil

Bodhai Yeri Budhi Maari (transl. Intoxicated and brainwashed) is a 2019 Indian Tamil action thriller film written and directed by newcomer Chandru KR. The film stars Dheeraj, Pradaini Surva, Radha Ravi, Mime Gopi, Charle and Dushara Vijayan.

== Plot ==
A man visits his friends a day before his wedding and ends up taking a potent drug. How does this change his life?

== Cast ==
- Dheeraj as Karthik
- Ajay as Commissioner Prasad
- Radha Ravi as Karthik's father
- Charle as Constable
- Mime Gopi as Minister
- Dushara Vijayan as Janani
- Pradaini Surva as Brindha
- Swaminathan as Janani's uncle
- Surekha Vani as Karthik's sister
- Roshan as Roshan
- Meera Mithun as Roshan's girlfriend
- Arjunan as Joy
- Senthil Kumaran as Ramesh
- Sharath Ravi as Murali
- Ashiq as Siddique
- Kesava Velan as Prem
- Rajalakshmi as Karthik's mother
- Lizzie Antony as Janani's mother
- Munish as Janani's husband
- Somithran as David
- Ramya as David's wife
- Vinay as Karthik's brother-in-law
- Santha as Karthik's grandmother

== Production ==
The film was announced by Sreenidhi Sagar of Rise East Entertainments Pvt Ltd, who liked the script and offered to produce the movie. The filming commenced in February 2019

== Reception ==
A critic from The New Indian Express gave the film a rating of two-and-a half out of five and noted that "The tonal shift feels jarring and the overtly theatrical performances by the supporting actors don’t help either".
