= Abishan Jeevinth =

Indian film director and actor (born 1 June 2000)

- Born: June 1, 2000 (age 26); Tiruchirappalli, Tamil Nadu, India
- Education: Loyola College, Chennai, Tamil Nadu
- Occupations: Actor; Film director; Screenwriter
- Years active: 2022–present
- Spouse: Akhila Ilangovan (m. 2025)
- Children: 1

Abishan Jeevinth (born 1 June 2000) is a Tamil actor and film director who works in Indian cinema.

== Personal life ==
Abishan Jeevinth was born on 1 June 2000 at Tiruchirappalli in Tamil Nadu, where he developed an early interest in cinema. He pursued a Bachelor of Science in Visual Communication at Loyola College, Chennai. Abishan married his longtime partner, Akhila Ilangovan, on 31 October 2025, after proposing to her during the promotions of Tourist Family (2025). He & his wife welcomed their First baby, a girl on 2 November 2026.

== Career ==
Abishan created sketch comedy videos on his YouTube channel, Thug Light. He later directed his first short film, Djinn (2019), followed by Nodigal Pirakatum (2020). During his final year in college in 2020, his debut feature film was signed; however, the project was shelved due to the COVID-19 pandemic in India.

During the pandemic, Abishan began writing a script inspired by Kamal Haasan's Thenali (2000), while he also working briefly as a teacher. Although his initial intention was to develop a sequel to the Haasan-starrer, the script eventually evolved into Tourist Family. Produced by Million Dollar Studios and MRP Entertainment, the film featured M. Sasikumar, Simran, Mithun Jai Sankar and Kamalesh Jagan in the lead roles, with Abishan appearing in a supporting role. The film grossed ₹90 crore (US$9.6 million) worldwide, emerging as one of the highest-grossing film of 2025, as well as one of the most profitable Indian film of the year. It received praise from several Indian film personalities, including actor Nani, and director S. S. Rajamouli. In 2026, the film was announced as one of the four Indian films amongst 201 submissions eligible for the Academy Award for Best Picture for the 2025 ceremony. Santanu Das of Hindustan Times described Abishan as a "major new cinematic voice," highlighting the emphasis on kindness, empathy and social harmony in Tourist Family.

With Love (2026) marked Abishan's subsequent project and his debut as a lead actor. The film was directed by Madhan, who had previously served as an associate director on Tourist Family, and was produced by MRP Entertainment in collaboration with Soundarya Rajinikanth's Zion Films. Starring Abishan and Anaswara Rajan in the lead roles, the film premiered on 3 February 2026 at Sathyam Cinemas, with notable atendees from the film fraternity.

== Filmography ==
Key
†	Denotes films that have not yet been released

Year	Title	Role	Notes	Ref.
2022	D Block	A student in the crowd	Uncredited Role	
2025	Tourist Family	Alcoholic youngster	Also director and writer Won, SIIMA Award for Best Debut Director	
2026	With Love	Sathya Seelan	Debut lead role	
2026	Picasso	Sugan	Post-production	
