= Jos Alukkas =

Indian jewelry company

- Type: Private
- Industry: Retailing
- Founder: Jos Alukkas
- Headquarters: Jos Alukkas Corporate Office, Fathima Nagar, Aristo Road, East Fort, Thrissur – 680005
- Area served: South India
- Key people: Jos Alukkas (Chairman); Varghese Alukkas (Managing Director); Paul J. Alukkas (Managing Director); John Alukkas (Managing Director)
- Products: Jewellery
- Number of employees: 3500+
- Website: www.josalukkasonline.com

Jos Alukkas Jewellery is a jewellery brand based in Thrissur, Kerala, India. Founded in 1964, the company has expanded from a family-owned business to a significant participant in the gold, diamond, and platinum jewellery market throughout India.

== History ==
The company's founder, Jos Alukkas, established a small jewellery unit in Thrissur in 1964. Under his guidance, the brand introduced the standardization of gold with the 916 purity certification, which has become a widely adopted benchmark in the Indian jewellery industry. Jos Alukkas is also known for pioneering the concept of "gold supermarkets," which are large-format stores featuring extensive collections of jewellery. Today, the Jos Alukkas Group, chaired by Jos Alukkas and managed by his sons Varghese Alukkas, Paul J. Alukkas, and John Alukkas, operates over 60 large-format jewellery showrooms across India and employs more than 5,000 people.

== Online presence and expansion ==
Jos Alukkas Jewellery was one of the early Indian jewellers to launch an online store, increasing accessibility for jewellery shopping. The brand provides a range of certified gold, diamond, and platinum jewellery. The Jos Alukkas Group has also diversified into the real estate sector through its subsidiary, Jos Alukkas Properties, which has completed more than 20 projects in South India.

== Recent developments ==
- The brand launched its new premium diamond collection, "Nityara," unveiled by actress Keerthy Suresh.
- Jos Alukkas announced a ₹5,500 crore investment plan to open 100 new stores across India over the next 7–8 years.
- Actor R. Madhavan was signed as the brand's pan-India ambassador.
- Jos Alukkas unveiled its latest jewellery collection, "Ivy," at a Mumbai event.
