= Bhagyashri Borse =

Indian actress (born 1999)

- Born: 6 May 2001 (age 25); Aurangabad, Maharashtra, India
- Education: BMS (Degree in Business Management)
- Occupation: Actress
- Years active: 2023–present

Bhagyashri Borse (born 6 May 2001) is an Indian actress who appears primarily in Telugu and Hindi films, and a few Tamil films. After doing cameo appearances in Hindi films Yaariyan 2 (2023) and Chandu Champion (2024), she made her lead debut in South with the Telugu film Mr. Bachchan (2024) for which she has won the SIIMA Award for Best Female Debut – Telugu.

== Early life and education ==
Borse was born in Chhatrapati Sambhajinagar), Maharashtra, India. She lived in Lagos, Nigeria, for seven years during her schooling before moving back to India. She later studied business management (BMS) in Mumbai while pursuing modelling. Borse recalled that she often faced bullying during her early years in Nigeria for not being able to speak English, as she only knew Hindi and Marathi at the time.

== Career ==
Borse made a cameo appearance in Hindi cinema with Yaariyan 2 (2023) and Chandu Champion (2024). She entered Telugu cinema with Mr. Bachchan (2024), directed by Harish Shankar and starring Ravi Teja. Her performance in Mr. Bachchan received attention from critics. Cinema Express observed that director Harish Shankar “relies on commercial treatment but gives enough room for his female lead Bhagyashri Borse to shine.” Deccan Chronicle later featured her among rising Telugu cinema talents, noting that her “transition from modelling to mainstream Telugu films has drawn strong audience recall.”

Her breakthrough came with Kingdom (2025), an action thriller directed by Gowtam Tinnanuri and starring Vijay Deverakonda, where she played a significant role. She was later seen as a lead alongside Ram Pothineni in Andhra King Taluka, and also opposite Dulquer Salmaan in her Tamil debut film Kaantha, for which she gained a lot of praise as the audience called her the new age Mahanati.

== Filmography ==
Key
†	Denotes films that have not yet been released

=== Films ===
Year	Title	Role	Language	Notes	Ref.
2023	Yaariyan 2	Raajlaxmi "Raaji" Cariappa	Hindi	Cameo appearance	
2024	Chandu Champion	Nayantara	Hindi	Cameo appearance	
2024	Mr. Bachchan	Jikki	Telugu		
2025	Kingdom	Dr. Madhu	Telugu		
2025	Kaantha	Kumari	Tamil		
2025	Andhra King Taluka	Mahalaxmi	Telugu		
2026	Lenin	Bharathi	Telugu		
TBA	Seyon †	TBA	Tamil	Filming	
TBA	Operation Ganga †	TBA	Malayalam	Filming	

=== Music videos ===
Year	Title	Singer	Language	Ref.
2026	"Radhimaa"	Sai Abhyankkar, Nargis, Ashma	Tamil	

== Awards and nominations ==
Year	Award	Category	Film	Result	Ref.
2024	13th South Indian International Movie Awards	Best Female Debut – Telugu	Mr. Bachchan	Won	
2025	Ananda Vikatan Cinema Awards	Best Debut Actress – Tamil	Kaantha	Won	
2025	14th South Indian International Movie Awards	Best Actress – Tamil	Kaantha	Nominated	
2025	14th South Indian International Movie Awards	Best Actress Critics – Tamil	Kaantha	Won	
