= Keerthy Suresh =

Indian actress (born 1992)

- Keerthy in 2018
- Born: 17 October 1992 (age 34); Thiruvananthapuram, Kerala, India
- Education: Fashion Technology, Pearl Academy, Bengaluru
- Occupation: Actress
- Years active: 2000–2005 (child artist); 2013–present
- Spouse: Antony Thattil (m. 2024)
- Parents: G. Suresh Kumar (father); Menaka (mother)

Keerthy Suresh (born 17 October 1992) is an Indian actress who predominantly appears in Tamil, Telugu and Malayalam films. Her film accolades include one National Film Award, five SIIMA Awards, one Tamil Nadu State Film Award and two Filmfare Awards South. Keerthy was placed in Forbes India's 30 Under 30 list of 2021.

Born to producer G. Suresh Kumar and actress Menaka, she began her career as a child actress in the early 2000s and returned to films after studying fashion design. She had her first lead role in the 2013 Malayalam film Geethaanjali, for which she won the SIIMA Award for Best Female Debut – Malayalam. After winning the SIIMA Award for Best Female Debut – Tamil for Idhu Enna Maayam (2015), Keerthy went on to star in successful films such as Ring Master (2014), Nenu Sailaja (2016), Rajinimurugan (2016), Remo (2016), Bairavaa (2017), Nenu Local (2017), TSK (2018) Sarkar (2018), Mahanati (2018), Sarkaru Vaari Paata (2022), and Dasara (2023)

Her portrayal of Savitri in the biopic Mahanati earned her the Filmfare Award and National Film Award for Best Actress. She won another Filmfare Best Actress award for the action film Dasara (2023).

== Early life and background ==
Keerthy Suresh was born on 17 October 1992 in Thiruvananthapuram, Kerala. Her father, G. Suresh Kumar, is a filmmaker of Malayali origin while her mother Menaka is an actress of Tamil origin. She has an elder sister Revathy Suresh.

Until class four, Keerthy did her schooling in Chennai, Tamil Nadu. She then studied in Kendriya Vidyalaya, Pattom, Kerala before coming back to Chennai to join the Pearl Academy, where she completed her degree in fashion design. Despite making a career in acting, she has stated that she was also "seriously considering a career in designing". Keerthy also plays the violin.

== Career ==
=== Child actress (2000–2005) ===
In the early 2000s, Keerthy worked as a child actress in a few of her father's productions, such as Pilots (2000), Achaneyanenikkishtam (2001) and Kuberan (2002) and some television serials. In 2004, she produced the Malayalam comedy film Vettam, alongside her mother Menaka and sister Revathy Sureshkumar.

=== Lead roles and career expansion (2013–2017) ===
Eleven years after Kuberan, she made her debut as a lead actress in Priyadarshan's horror film Geethaanjali, in which she had a dual role. She was still studying during that time and shot for Geethanjali during her semester break. Reviews on the film and her performance were mixed, with Sify writing that she "does put in some effort but makes only a limited impression in a double role", while Rediff wrote that she "has got a plum role but whether she impresses with her acting prowess is another matter". In 2014, Keerthy had her next release Ring Master, directed by Rafi of Rafi Mecartin duo, in which she shared screen space with Dileep. She played a blind girl, which she said was much more challenging than her double role in Geethanjali. The film was a commercial success, being termed a "super hit" by Sify.

In 2015, Keerthy accepted her first projects outside of Malayalam and signed on to appear in several Tamil film projects simultaneously. Her first film release was A. L. Vijay's romantic comedy Idhu Enna Maayam (2015), opposite Vikram Prabhu, though the film did not perform well at the box office. Her busy schedule throughout 2015 meant that she had to opt out of films which she had already started working on, including Krishna's Maane Thaene Paeye and Deekay's Kavalai Vendam, in order to accommodate bigger projects. She consequently worked on two films with Sivakarthikeyan in quick succession, Rajinimurugan and Remo, while also playing the lead role in Prabhu Solomon's Thodari, alongside Dhanush.

Her Telugu debut was planned to be Ainaa Ishtam Nuvvu. However, the film is delayed since 2015, with reports of release after September 2020 under a new title Janakitho Nenu. Subsequently, the debut was the 2016 film Nenu Sailaja with actor Ram Pothineni. In January 2017, Keerthy appeared in Bairavaa, opposite actor Vijay and directed by Bharathan. She also appeared in Tamil film Paambhu Sattai and Telugu film Nenu Local in 2017.

=== Mahanati and established actor (2018–present) ===
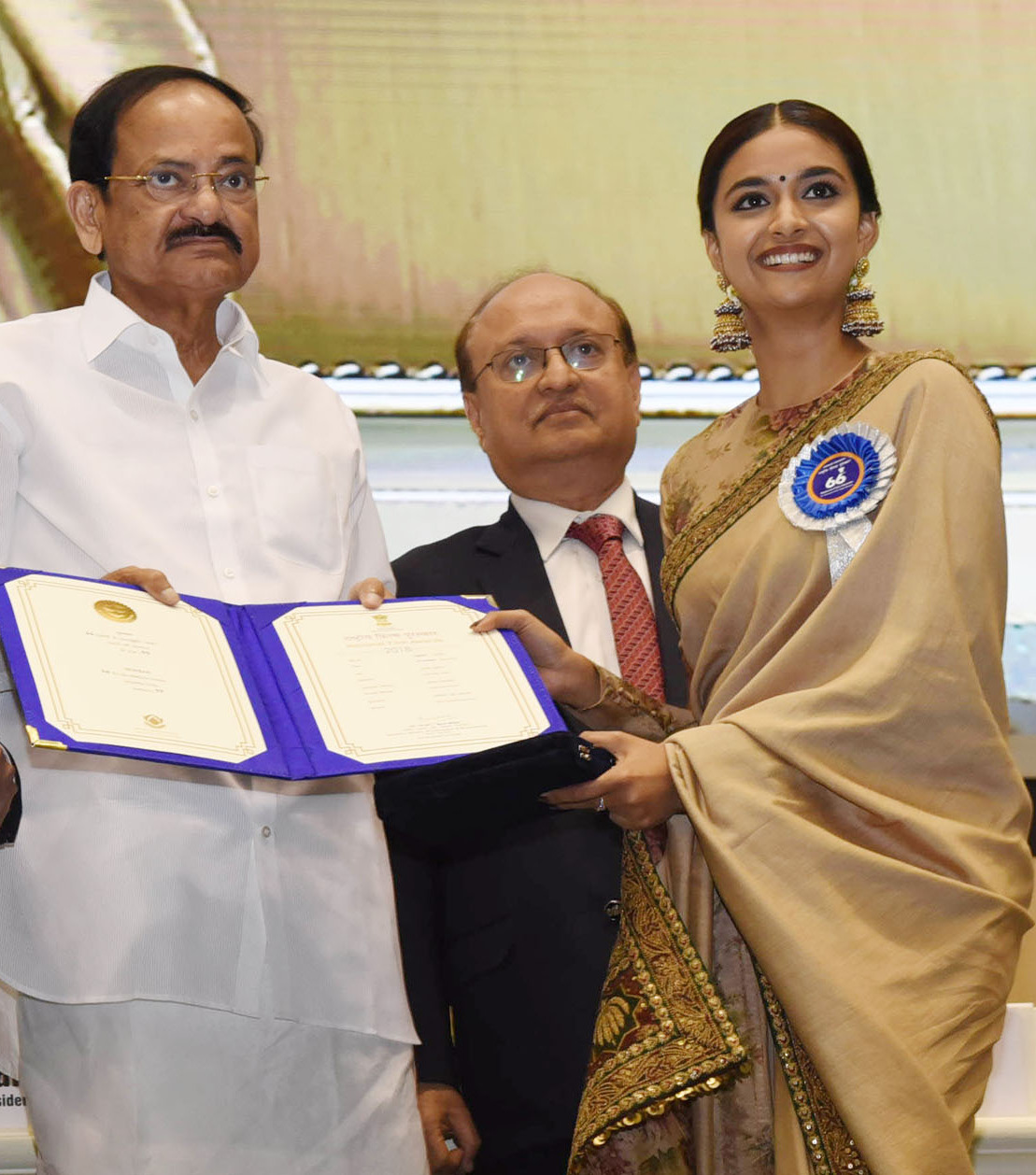
Keerthy receiving National Award for Mahanati

Her first release in 2018, was Agnyaathavaasi in Telugu. Her first Tamil film in 2018 was Thaanaa Serndha Koottam, in which she played opposite Suriya for the first time. The film opened to positive reviews and became a hit. She also acted in the Nag Ashwin-directed biographical drama Mahanati where she portrayed the late southern actress Savitri and for which her performance has received critical acclaim and the National Film Award for Best Actress. Her performance in the film featured in the list of "100 Greatest Performances of the Decade" by Film Companion.

In late 2018, she appeared in three consecutive commercial films, Saamy Square opposite Vikram directed by Hari, Sandakozhi 2 opposite Vishal directed by N. Lingusamy and Sarkar opposite Vijay, directed by AR Murugadoss. In mid-2019, she made a cameo appearance in the Nagarjuna starrer Manmadhudu 2, which was directed by Rahul Ravindran. In 2020, she appeared in the thriller film Penguin, which released on Amazon Prime due to the COVID-19 pandemic and in the drama film Miss India which released on Netflix.

In 2021, Keerthy starred in the Telugu language film Rang De opposite Nithiin. Keerthy's next film Annaatthe starring Rajinikanth directed by Siva opened to negative reviews. Her next release was the Malayalam film Marakkar: Arabikadalinte Simham starring Mohanlal directed by Priyadarshan, which opened to mixed reviews became box office bomb.

Her first release of 2022 was the Telugu film Good Luck Sakhi which again opened to negative reviews and ended up as a commercial failure. Keerthy went on to appear alongside director Selvaraghavan in Saani Kaayidham, which marks the latter's acting debut. Her role went on to be critically acclaimed and is one of her best roles done by her. The film had a direct OTT release in Amazon Prime Video. Her next film was the Parasuram directorial Sarkaru Vaari Paata, alongside Mahesh Babu. She was next seen in the Malayalam courtroom drama Vaashi opposite Tovino Thomas. Keerthy had three releases in 2023. First was Nani-starrer Dasara where she played the main lead opposite Nani. Keerthy received the Filmfare Award for Best Actress – Telugu for her performance. Next came the Mari Selvaraj directorial Maamannan opposite Udhayanidhi Stalin in his final acting role. However, her third release, the Chiranjeevi-starrer Bhola Shankar, remake of the Tamil movie, Vedalam (2015), opened to negative reviews and became a box office disaster.

Her first release of 2024 was Siren a Tamil action thriller by debut director Antony Bhagyaraj opposite Jayam Ravi where Keerthy portrayed as Inspector. The film was a commercial success and received positive reviews from critics. In next film, Keerthy gave voice role for BU-JZ-1 aka Bujji an AI droid / vehicle in Kalki 2898 AD a Telugu language Sci-fi action directed by Nag Ashwin which was also dubbed in other languages. Keerthy's performance as Bujji was praised by audiences. She also dubbed for Bujji and Bhairava an animated series of Amazon prime video release in multiple languages, giving each language 5–6 modulations to find the best fit. Her next film was the Tamil political comedy Raghu Thatha by Hombale Films, released on 15 August. Keerthy portrayed the lead role, a career woman who learns Hindi to receive a job to escape from marriage. The film was considered a success by the makers. In her next film, she appeared in her Hindi debut, Baby John opposite Varun Dhawan released on 25 December a remake of the Tamil film Theri. She is also roped into a new woman centric film Revolver Rita. She is also set to appear in the solo film, Kanni Vedi in Tamil.

== Media image ==
Keerthy is among the highest paid South Indian actresses, according to media reports. She was placed in Forbes India's "30 Under 30" list of 2021. Keerthy became the most tweeted about South Indian actress in 2020 and 2021. Forbes India noted, "Keerthy has earned her stripes in Tamil, Telugu and Malayalam films, impressing with her spontaneity." Praising Keerthy, film director Nag Ashwin said, "She's a director's actor and an instinctive performer, quite natural. If fit in the right story and character, she is quite something." Keerthy has frequently featured in Hyderabad Times' 30 Most Desirable Woman list. She was placed 21st in 2018, 20th in 2019 and 26th in 2020. She is a celebrity endorser for brands including Jos Alukkas.

== Personal life ==
After a 15-year relationship, Keerthy married her long-time boyfriend, Antony Thattil, on 12 December 2024, in Goa in a traditional Hindu and Malayali Christian wedding ceremony. He is an engineer and a businessman, and his family hails from Kochi, Kerala.

== Filmography ==
=== Films ===
Key
†	Denotes films that have not yet been released

List of Keerthy Suresh film credits
Year	Title	Role	Language(s)	Notes	Ref.
2000	Pilots	Church kid	Malayalam	Child actress	
2001	Achaneyanenikkishtam	Kunjunni's classmate	Malayalam	Child actress	
2002	Kuberan	Siddharth's adopted child	Malayalam	Child actress	
2013	Geethaanjali	Geetha, Anjali	Malayalam	Lead Debut	
2014	Ring Master	Karthika	Malayalam		
2015	Idhu Enna Maayam	Maya	Tamil		
2016	Nenu Sailaja	Sailaja	Telugu		
2016	Rajinimurugan	N. Karthika Devi	Tamil		
2016	Thodari	Saroja	Tamil		
2016	Remo	Dr. Kavya	Tamil		
2017	Bairavaa	Malarvizhi	Tamil		
2017	Paambhu Sattai	Veni	Tamil		
2017	Nenu Local	Keerthy	Telugu		
2018	Agnyaathavaasi	Sukumari	Telugu		
2018	Mahanati	Savitri	Telugu	66th National Film Awards for Best Actress	
2018	Thaanaa Serndha Koottam	Madhu Iyengar	Tamil		
2018	Seemaraja	Bhoomi	Tamil	Cameo appearance	
2018	Saamy Square	Diya	Tamil	Also singer for "Pudhu Metro Rail"	
2018	Sandakozhi 2	Sembaruthi	Tamil		
2018	Sarkar	Nila	Tamil		
2019	Manmadhudu 2	Suma	Telugu	Cameo appearance	
2020	Penguin	Rhythm	Tamil		
2020	Miss India	Manasa Samyuktha	Telugu		
2021	Jathi Ratnalu	Vanajakshi	Telugu	Cameo appearance	
2021	Rang De	Anupama	Telugu		
2021	Annaatthe	Thanga Meenatchi	Tamil		
2021	Marakkar: Arabikadalinte Simham	Aarcha	Malayalam		
2022	Vaashi	Adv. Madhavi Mohan	Malayalam	25th Film	
2022	Saani Kaayidham	Ponni	Tamil		
2022	Good Luck Sakhi	Sakhi Pawar	Telugu		
2022	Sarkaru Vaari Paata	Kalaavathi	Telugu		
2023	Dasara	Vennela	Telugu		
2023	Bhola Shankar	Mahalakshmi	Telugu		
2023	Maamannan	Leela	Tamil		
2024	Siren	Inspector K. Nandhini	Tamil		
2024	Raghu Thatha	Kayalvizhi Pandian "Kayal" / Ka. Pandian	Tamil		
2024	Kalki 2898 AD	Bujji	Telugu	Voice role	
2024	Baby John	Dr. Meera Verma	Hindi	Debut in Hindi Cinema	
2025	Uppu Kappurambu	Apoorva	Telugu		
2025	Revolver Rita	Rita	Tamil		
2026	The Paradise	Herself	Telugu	Special appearance in the song "Yeshanagula"	
2026	Dorothy	Dorothy	Tamil		
2026	Sathyavan Savithri	Savithri	Tamil		
2026	Rowdy Janardhana †	TBA	Telugu	Filming	
2027	January 12 Vidudala †	TBA	Telugu	Filming	
2027	Kannivedi †	TBA	Tamil	Filming	
2027	Thottam †	TBA	Malayalam	Filming	
2027	Raftaar †	TBA	Hindi	Post-production	

=== Television ===
List of Keerthy Suresh television credits
Year	Title	Network	Language	Notes	Ref.
2003	Grihanadhan	DD Malayalam	Malayalam	Child actress; telefilm	
2004	Santhana Gopalam	Surya TV	Malayalam	Child actress; serial	
2005	Krishna Kripa Sagaram	Amrita TV	Malayalam	Child actress; serial	
2024	Bujji & Bhairava	Amazon Prime Video	Telugu	Voice role as Bujji	
2026	Akka	Netflix	Hindi	Webseries. Role as Bhavani	

=== Music video appearances ===
Keerthy Suresh music video appearances credits
Year	Title	Singer	Composer	Language	Ref.
2022	"Gandhari"	Ananya Bhat	Pawan Ch	Telugu	
2022	"Har Ghar Tiranga"	Asha Bhosle, Sonu Nigam, Devi Sri Prasad	Devi Sri Prasad	Mutlilingual	

== Accolades ==
=== National Film Awards ===
Year	Award	Category	Work	Result	Ref.
2019	National Film Awards	Best Actress	Mahanati	Won	

=== Tamil Nadu State Film Awards ===
Year	Award	Category	Work	Result	Ref.
2016	Tamil Nadu State Film Awards	Best Actress	Paambhu Sattai	Won	

=== Filmfare Awards South ===
Year	Award	Category	Work	Result	Ref.
2017	64th Filmfare Awards South	Best Actress – Telugu	Nenu Sailaja	Nominated	
2019	66th Filmfare Awards South	Best Actress – Telugu	Mahanati	Won	
2022	68th Filmfare Awards South	Best Actress – Tamil	Saani Kaayidham	Nominated	
2023	69th Filmfare Awards South	Best Actress – Telugu	Dasara	Won	
2024	70th Filmfare Awards South	Best Actress - Tamil	Raghu Thatha	Nominated	

=== South Indian International Movie Awards ===
Year	Award	Category	Work	Result	Ref.
2014	3rd South Indian International Movie Awards	Best Female Debut - Malayalam	Geethaanjali	Won	
2016	5th South Indian International Movie Awards	Best Female Debut - Tamil	Idhu Enna Maayam	Won	
2017	6th South Indian International Movie Awards	Best Female Debut – Telugu	Nenu Sailaja	Nominated	
2019	8th South Indian International Movie Awards	Best Actress – Telugu	Mahanati	Won	
2021	10th South Indian International Movie Awards	Best Actress – Tamil	Penguin	Nominated	
2023	11th South Indian International Movie Awards	Best Actress – Tamil	Saani Kaayidham	Nominated	
2023	11th South Indian International Movie Awards	Best Actress Critics – Tamil	Saani Kaayidham	Won	
2023	11th South Indian International Movie Awards	Best Actress – Malayalam	Vaashi	Nominated	
2024	12th South Indian International Movie Awards	Best Actress – Telugu	Dasara	Won	
2024	12th South Indian International Movie Awards	Best Actress - Tamil	Maamannan	Nominated	
2025	13th South Indian International Movie Awards	Best Actress - Tamil	Raghu Thatha	Nominated	

=== Other Awards and Recognitions ===
Year	Award	Category	Work	Result	Ref.
2014	16th Asianet Film Awards	Best New Face of the Year	Geethaanjali	Won	
2015	Edison Awards Tamil	Best Female Rising Star	Idhu Enna Maayam	Won	
2018	Indian Film Festival of Melbourne	Best Actress	Mahanati	Nominated	
2019	Norway Tamil Film Festival Awards	Best Actress	Nadigaiyar Thilagam	Nominated	
2019	Norway Tamil Film Festival Awards	Special Jury Award	Nadigaiyar Thilagam	Won	
2019	Edison Awards Tamil	Best Actress	Nadigaiyar Thilagam	Nominated	
2019	Zee Cine Awards Telugu	Best Actress	Mahanati	Won	
2024	3rd IIFA Utsavam	Best Actress – Telugu	Dasara	Nominated	
2024	3rd IIFA Utsavam	Best Actress – Tamil	Maamannan	Nominated	
