= The Lift Boy =

2019 Indian film

- Poster
- Directed by: Jonathan Augustin
- Written by: Jonathan Augustin
- Produced by: Caroline Pictures
- Starring: Moin Khan; Nyla Masood; Aneesha Shah
- Edited by: Parikshhit Jha
- Music by: Ryan Clark
- Release date: 18 January 2019
- Running time: 107 minutes
- Country: India
- Languages: English; Hindi; Marathi

The Lift Boy is an Indian family-drama film that was released in 2019. It was written and directed by debutant Jonathan Augustin and produced by Caroline Pictures. Moin Khan and Nyla Masood appeared in leading roles in the film. The music is by Ryan Clark and edited by Parikshhit Jha.

== Plot ==
The film is about the life of 24-year-old Raju Tawde (Moin Khan). Raju’s father who is a lift operator in a building suffers from a heart attack while on duty. To fill his father’s shoes while he is away, Raju takes up the job. While working he befriends Mrs. D’Souza, the owner of the building. Throughout the course, Mrs. D’Souza helps Raju to clear a pending exam for engineering drawing.

== Cast ==
- Moin Khan as Raju Tawade - The Lift Boy
- Nyla Masood as Maureen D'Souza
- Saagar Kale as Krishna Tawade
- Aneesha Shah as Princess Kapoor
- Damian D'Souza as Shawn Lobo
- Neha Bam as Laxmi Tawade
- Nil Mani as Watchman
- Kaustubh Narain as Cyrus Mistry
- Shilpa Iyer as Mrs. Kapoor
- Santosh Mohite as Mama
- Pallas Prajapati as Boman Mistry
- Jigna Khajuria as Lata

== Release and reception ==
The film was released on 18 January 2019.

Firstpost gave it 2 out of 5 stars and stated: "An optimistic coming-of-age story marred by incomplete writing". Sify called it "simple yet heart warming" and gave it 2.5 out of 5 stars. TheWeek gave a positive review, saying it "lifts your heart", and gave it 3.5 out of 5 stars.
