= Dushara Vijayan =

Indian actress (born 1997)

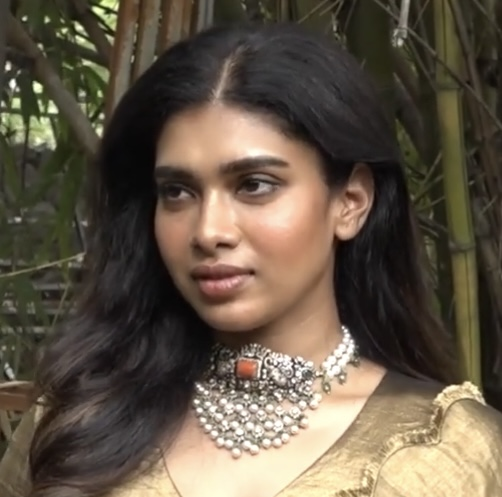
- Dushara in 2023
- Born: 14 October 1997 (age 28); Dindigul, Tamil Nadu, India
- Occupation: Actress
- Years active: 2019–present
- Father: K. Vijayan

Dushara Vijayan (born 14 October 1997) is an Indian actress who is known for her works in Tamil cinema. She made her debut in the Tamil film Bodhai Yeri Budhi Maari (2019), and gained recognition for her performances in Sarpatta Parambarai (2021), Natchathiram Nagargiradhu (2022), Raayan (2024) and Vettaiyan (2024). In January 2026, she received the Tamil Nadu State Film Award for Best Actress (Special Prize) for her 2022 performance in the film Natchathiram Nagargiradhu.

== Career ==
Born in Dindigul as the daughter of a local DMK Treasurer K. Vijayan, Dushara initially pursued an engineering degree, before discontinuing and taking fashion studies. She made her acting debut in Bodhai Yeri Budhi Maari (2019), a film made by newcomers, before working on Anbulla Ghilli (2022), a film based on a dog.

Dushara's breakthrough came through the sports drama Sarpatta Parambarai (2021), where she portrayed a feisty woman from 1970s Madras. She was selected for the film after director Pa. Ranjith had seen a photograph of her on Twitter and called her for a twenty-minute audition. Despite initially being unconvinced, Ranjith later chose to select her for the role. To prepare for the film, she learnt North Chennai dialect and picked up specific patterns of behaviour. The film opened to positive reviews, with Dushara's performance winning acclaim.

Dushara was later seen in Pa. Ranjith's romantic drama Natchathiram Nagargiradhu (2022) and Vasanthabalan's thriller Aneethi (2023) opposite Arjun Das. In 2024, she appeared in Dhanush's action drama Raayan, and received critical acclaim for her performance. Dushara Vijayan plays a teacher named Saranya with Rajinikanth in Vettaiyan (2024). She plays the wife character with Vikram in Veera Dheera Sooran: Part 2 (2025).

== Filmography ==
=== Films ===
Key
†	Denotes films that have not yet been released

- All films are in Tamil, unless otherwise noted.

Year	Title	Role	Notes
2019	Bodhai Yeri Budhi Maari	Janani	Debut film
2021	Sarpatta Parambarai	Maariyamma	Lead debut
2022	Anbulla Ghilli	Anvitha	
2022	Natchathiram Nagargiradhu	Rene (Thamizh)	
2023	Kazhuvethi Moorkkan	Kavitha	
2023	Aneethi	Subbulakshmi	
2024	Raayan	Durga	
2024	Vettaiyan	Saranya	
2025	Veera Dheera Sooran	K. Kalaivaani "Kalai"	
2026	Kattalan	Lucy	Malayalam film
2026	G.D.N	Ranganayaki	
2026	Magudam	Jamuna	
TBA	Almost Nallavan †	TBA	Filming

=== Web series ===
Key
†	Denotes films that have not yet been released

- All shows are in Tamil, unless otherwise noted.

Year	Title	Role	Network	Notes
2019	Postman	Anitha	ZEE5	
2026	Exam	Jhansi	Amazon Prime Video	

=== Music video ===
Year	Song	Artist	Ref.
2024	"She's A Killer"	Yuvan Shankar Raja	

== Awards and nominations ==
Year	Award(s)	Category	Film(s)	Result	Ref.
2022	10th South Indian International Movie Awards	Best Female Debut – Tamil	Sarpatta Parambarai	Nominated	
2022	OTT Play Awards	Emerging OTT Star – Female	Sarpatta Parambarai	Won	
2022	JFW Awards	Best Female Debutant - Critics choice	Sarpatta Parambarai	Won	
2022	Galata Crown Award	Best Actress - Critics choice	Sarpatta Parambarai	Won	
2022	67th Filmfare Awards South	Best Actress – Tamil	Sarpatta Parambarai	Nominated	
2022	11th South Indian International Movie Awards	Best Actress – Tamil	Natchathiram Nagargiradhu	Nominated	
2023	Tamil Nakshatram Awards	Best Actress	Natchathiram Nagargiradhu	Won	
2024	22nd Chennai International Film Festival	Best Supporting Actress	Vettaiyan	Won	
2025	13th South Indian International Movie Awards	Best Actress – Critic's Choice	Raayan|style="background: #9EFF9E; color: #000; vertical-align: middle; text-align: center; " class="yes table-yes2 notheme"|Won		
2025	13th South Indian International Movie Awards	Best Actress – Tamil	Raayan|style="background: #9EFF9E; color: #000; vertical-align: middle; text-align: center; " class="yes table-yes2 notheme"|Won		Nominated
2025	17th Edison Awards South	Best Actress	Raayan|style="background: #9EFF9E; color: #000; vertical-align: middle; text-align: center; " class="yes table-yes2 notheme"|Won	Nominated	
2025	Ananda Vikatan Cinema Awards	Best Character Actress	Raayan & Vettaiyan	Nominated	
