= Revolver Rita =

2025 Tamil film by JK. Chandru

- Theatrical release poster
- Directed by: JK. Chandru
- Written by: JK. Chandru
- Produced by: Sudhan Sundaram; Jagadish Palanisamy
- Starring: Keerthy Suresh
- Cinematography: Dinesh B. Krishnan
- Edited by: Praveen K. L.
- Music by: Sean Roldan
- Production companies: Passion Studios; The Route
- Release date: 28 November 2025
- Running time: 140 minutes
- Country: India
- Language: Tamil

Revolver Rita is a 2025 Indian Tamil-language crime comedy film written and directed by JK. Chandru. It is produced by Sudhan Sundaram and Jagadish Palanisamy under Passion Studios and The Route. The film stars Keerthy Suresh in the lead role alongside Radhika Sarathkumar, Sunil, Redin Kingsley, Sendrayan, Super Subbarayan and others in supporting roles. The film has music composed by Sean Roldan, editing handled by Praveen K. L. and cinematography handled by Dinesh B. Krishnan. Revolver Rita was released in theatres on 28 November 2025.

== Plot ==
In Pondicherry, rifle‑club owner Prabhakar purchases land worth ₹20,000,000 (equivalent to ₹66 million or US$700,000 in 2026), discovers he's been swindled by Jayabal, and commits suicide. The notorious gangster Dracula Pandiyan's son, Dracula Bobby, murders Narasimha Reddy, beheads him, and sends the head to his brother Reddy; Reddy vows revenge. Eighteen years later, Prabhakar's second daughter, Rita, works at a fried‑chicken restaurant and is preparing for her niece Yazhini's birthday. Still seeking vengeance, Reddy hires an assassin named Martin "Master" to kill Pandiyan for ₹5 crore. Master lures Pandiyan through a pimp, Lallu, claiming a call‑girl named Sonia is waiting. Drunken Pandiyan mistakenly enters Rita's house; Rita and her mother, Chellamma, demand he leave, but he draws a gun, and Chellamma strikes him with a pressure‑cooker lid, causing him to collapse and die.

Rita presses on with Yazhini’s birthday party, so no one suspects anything. While Pandiyan's phone call with Lallu is still live, Master and his crew learn of Pandiyan's death and plot to steal the body that night after the party. Rita's elder sister Riya identifies the corpse as gangster Dracula Pandiyan and mentions his son, Dracula Bobby. Chellamma urges surrender, but Rita refuses, recalling her past clash with Inspector Kamaraj—who was suspended after she posted a video of him demanding free chicken soup—and vows not to hand herself over. Rita hides Pandiyan's body in the fridge and schemes to buy a used car as dowry for her brother‑in‑law, Gowri Shankar "Gowri," who is currently separated from Riya. She plans to drive the car under the pretence of taking Reena to her NEET exam at Pondicherry University through the Auroville forest, dump the corpse in a trolley suitcase, give the car to Gowri, and thereby reunite Riya with her husband.

When Master learns of this plan, he decides to seize Pandiyan's corpse that very night. Lallu demands his ₹50 lakh fee immediately, so Master and Doss lure him to the Old Harbour to kill him. Meanwhile, Kumar and Babu are watching Rita's house. Doss knows Master is set to receive ₹ from Reddy but will only share ₹10 lakh with them, so Doss, Kumar and Babu join forces and murder Master and inform Reddy. Lallu, having witnessed the three kill Master, panics and falsely claims he has already left for Hyderabad. At a bar, Doss, Kumar and Babu are arrested by Kamaraj. Gowri arrives to see his one‑year‑old daughter, Yazhini. Chellamma accidentally blurts out that they killed Pandiyan. Riya suggests they get Gowri heavily drunk so that he will forget the night's events, and so they load him into an auto and drop him at the police station. The next morning, Bobby is furious that his father is missing and asks Kamaraj to help find him, also searching for the pimp Lallu, who had lured Pandiyan.

Doss, Kumar and Babu break out of the police station and ask Reddy to meet them at the Old Harbour that afternoon to collect Pandiyan's head. Rita purchases a used black Honda City – the same car Pandiyan had left his house in the night before; it was stolen and sold to her that morning. With Kamaraj's help, Bobby tracks his father's mobile, and a car‑thief tip leads Kamaraj to discover that Rita now owns the car, giving him a chance to settle his earlier grudge against her. Rita and her family pack Pandiyan's corpse into a trolley suitcase and hide it in the boot of their car. While driving to Pondicherry University to drop Reena, they are bumped at a petrol station by Pandiyan's dim‑witted second son, Cheetta, which causes the boot to get locked. Chellamma breaks the trunk‑release lever, and after a hurried stop at a mechanic who wires the door shut, they continue.

At the university, Doss and his two henchmen are waiting to ambush Rita, while Bobby tracks down the pimp Lallu and Kamaraj obtains Rita's address; both groups learn the family is at the exam venue. Meanwhile, Reddy arrives at the Old Harbour demanding Pandiyan's head. Bobby, frustrated by the delay, assaults a travel vlogger on the road, and Cheetta suggests they look for the call‑girl Sonia instead of Lallu. Gowri climbs into the car, and the family labels him a lunatic and dumps him at a mental hospital. Sonia's reels later reveal her identity to Bobby. Doss spots Rita, but Kamaraj intervenes, framing Rita for stealing Pandiyan's car and demanding a ₹50‑lakh bribe or sexual favours. Rita angrily refuses. Doss attempts to retrieve the corpse from the car trunk while it sits in the police station. But Rita uses the mosquito‑smoke being sprayed to distract Kamaraj, steals the car key, and escapes. Doss and his sidekicks break into the station, fight the officers, and escape to pursue Rita's car. Through Lallu, Bobby learns that Pandiyan had last entered Rita's house.

When Doss confronts Rita and demands Pandiyan's corpse, the trolley case is gone. It is revealed that Sonia and Lallu had trailed Rita, and while Rita's family was at the mental hospital, they moved the corpse into their car to claim the ₹5 crore ransom from Reddy. Doss forces Rita to reveal Lallu's location, intercepts Lallu and recovers the corpse, and murders both Sonia and Lallu. He then tells Reddy he now holds the body. To eliminate potential witnesses, Doss orders Kumar to shoot Rita, but Babu shoots Kumar instead. While captive, Rita convinced Babu to kill Doss and Kumar so they could split the ransom. Believing Rita, Babu kills Doss, but Rita knocks Babu and escapes with her family. She contacts Kamaraj, offering ₹5 crore instead of the earlier ₹50 lakh bribe and hands over Pandiyan's corpse, falsely claiming that Doss and his gang killed Pandiyan and that she fled the police station after they tried to escape with the body.

Kamaraj finalises a deal with Reddy. Rita, fearing the corrupt Kamaraj, sends her location to Reena and arranges for Bobby—who is hunting them—to meet her through Reena. When Bobby arrives, he threatens both Kamaraj and Rita to reveal the truth about his father's death. Rita, speaking boldly, accuses Kamaraj of framing her family for the murder and wins Bobby's trust; he then kills Kamaraj. As Rita and her family prepare to leave, Cheetta appears, having found Pandiyan's chain in the kitchen and suspecting Rita. Riya confesses that Rita and Chellamma killed Pandiyan. Before Bobby can shoot Rita, Reddy arrives, erupting a gunfight between Bobby's gang and Reddy's men. Rita knocks Bobby down and hands a pistol to Reddy, and Reddy shoots Bobby dead. Reddy thanks Rita and turns to leave, but Rita draws gun on him, revealing that Reddy's full name is Jayabal Reddy, the one who swindled Rita's father, Prabhakar, out of a ₹2 crore land deal 18 years earlier, driving Prabhakar to suicide.

Rita explains that she saw Jayabal Reddy's photo with Doss and decided to seek revenge. So she manipulated Babu into killing Kumar and Doss, and steered Bobby into killing Kamaraj and Reddy against Bobby, clearing the way for her revenge. She then shoots Reddy and leaves with the ₹5 crore ransom money. Cheetta, thanks Rita and declares that with Pandiyan gone, he will claim the vacant donship of Puducherry.

== Cast ==
- Keerthy Suresh as Rita
- Radhika Sarathkumar as Chellama
- Super Subbarayan as Dracula Pandian
- Sunil as Dracula Bobby
- Ajay Ghosh as Jayabal Reddy "Reddy"
- Suresh Chakravarthy as Lallu
- John Vijay as Inspector Kamaraj
- Redin Kingsley as Cheetta
- M. J. Shriram as Prabhakar
- Kalyan Master as Martin "Master"
- Sendrayan as Kumar, Martin's gangmember
- Ram Rajendran as Constable Yovan
- Rajapandi as Constable
- Kathiravan as Doss, Martin's gangmember
- Augustin as Babu, Martin's gangmember
- Ramachandran Durairaj as Ponraj, Bobby's henchman
- Blade Shankar as Gowri Shankar "Gowri", Rita's brother-in-law
- Winner Ramachandran as Constable Kanagu
- Bujji Babu as Lallu's house owner
- Gayathri Shan as Riya, Rita's elder sister
- Akshathaa Ajit as Reena, Rita's younger sister
- Kuhasini as Sonia
- Mahima as Aarthy, Rita's friend
- Nisha as Chicken shop owner
- Baby Sana as Yazhini
- Baby Rhayah Mrithika as young Rita
- Sathish Kannan as Bobby's henchman
- Guna Babu as Bobby's henchman
- Indrajith as Ceylon Babu
- Sanjeevi as Danny
- Aravind as Reddy's assistant
- Praveen as Suresh
- Balaji Srinivasan as Bobby's henchman
- Sasi as mechanic shop boy
- Logan as food delivery boy
- Balaji as bakery boy
- Balamurugaa T. as Gowri's friend
- Bala as a mechanic

== Production ==
On 14 January 2023, Samantha Ruth Prabhu revealed the first look of the Keerthy Suresh starrer film titled Revolver Rita reusing the title of a 1970 Tamil film starring Vijaya Lalitha and Jyothi Lakshmi. The first-look poster featuring Keerthy in a vintage look was released having directed by JK. Chandru of Naveena Saraswathi Sabatham (2013) fame, in his comeback project as a director. The film is produced by Sudhan Sundaram under Passion Studios and Jagdish Palanisamy under The Route banners respectively. The film also stars Radhika Sarathkumar, Redin Kingsley, Sendrayan,Super Subbarayan and others in supporting roles.

The film has music composed by Sean Roldan. The technical crew consists of Dinesh Krishnan B as the cinematographer, Praveen K. L. as the editor, Dhilip Subbarayan as its stunt choerographer and Vinoth Rajkumar as the art director, while Aishwarya Suresh serves as the creative producer. On 17 October 2023, on the occasion of Keerthy's birthday, the makers released a title-teaser cum glimpse video featuring the lead actor to portray a middle-class girl with an unknown dark side. Principal photography was planned to commence by early March–April 2023. Filming wrapped on 1 May 2024.

== Music ==
Revolver Rita

Soundtrack album by Sean Roldan
- Genre: Feature film soundtrack
- Language: Tamil
- Label: Think Music
- Producer: Sean Roldan

Sean Roldan chronology
Love Marriage (2025)	Revolver Rita (2025)	With Love (2026)

Singles from Revolver Rita
- 1. "Happy Birthday" Released: 17 October 2025; 2. "Danger Mamae" Released: 24 November 2025

The soundtrack and background is composed by Sean Roldan in his second collaboration with Keerthy after Raghu Thatha (2024). The first single titled "Happy Birthday" was released on 17 October 2025, coinciding Keerthy's birthday. The second single titled "Danger Mamae" was released on 24 November 2025. The promo song titled "Masalamma" was released on 26 November 2025.

Track listing
No.	Title	Lyrics	Singer(s)	Length
1.	"Happy Birthday"	Mohan Rajan	Arivu, Sean Roldan
2.	"Danger Mamae"	Dacalty	Dacalty
3.	"Masalamma"	Mohan Rajan	Sean Roldan

== Release ==
=== Theatrical ===
Revolver Rita was released in theatres on 28 November 2025. Earlier it was reported to have a theatrical release in 2024 and then was scheduled for 27 August 2025, but was postponed.

=== Home media ===
On 16 January 2023, Netflix announced that they have acquired the digital streaming rights of Revolver Rita along with a list of 14 other films. It began streaming on Netflix from 26 December 2025.

== Reception ==
Avinash Ramachandran of Cinema Express gave 2/5 stars and wrote "With competent artillery and just enough ammunition, Revolver Rita definitely fires on all cylinders, but only a handful come even close to the target, and one just wishes that the weapon was held with a firmer grip simply because it ends up as a chaotic misfire." The Times of India gave 2/5 stars and wrote "The blackness of the premise never fully loads, the comedy struggles to find its rhythm, the plotting feels predictable, and the cast can’t muster enough spark to set off anything memorable." Latha Srinivasan of NDTV gave 2/5 stars and wrote "Revolver Rita was a good shot for director JK Chandru to showcase his talent but the movie's uneven screenplay backfires for him unfortunately."

Janani K of India Today gave 1.5/5 stars and wrote "Revolver Rita stands out as a missed opportunity from director JK Chandru. The primary criticisms are its thin plot, unoriginal narrative choices, and reliance on outdated storytelling ideas, which prevent the film from being enjoyable or memorable." Anusha Sundar of OTT Play gave 1.5/5 stars and wrote "Revolver Rita is faltered attempt at making a crime comedy film, for neither of the elements are fully utilised in the writing. The comedy is exaggerated by questionable, the characters lack any impressionable interest, and with forgettable, template story, Revolver Rita misfires big time." Bhuvanesh Chandar of The Hindu wrote "Keerthy Suresh’s dreary dark comedy disguises a predictable story as clever writing, and ends up as soulless as the corpse it hauls around."
