= Raayan =

2024 Indian film by Dhanush

- Theatrical release poster
- Directed by: Dhanush
- Written by: Dhanush
- Produced by: Kalanithi Maran
- Starring: Dhanush; Dushara Vijayan; S. J. Suryah; Sundeep Kishan; Kalidas Jayaram; Prakash Raj; Selvaraghavan; Aparna Balamurali
- Cinematography: Om Prakash
- Edited by: Prasanna GK
- Music by: A. R. Rahman
- Production company: Sun Pictures
- Distributed by: see below
- Release date: 26 July 2024
- Running time: 145 minutes
- Country: India
- Language: Tamil
- Budget: est. ₹100 crore
- Box office: est. ₹160 crore

Raayan is a 2024 Indian Tamil-language neo-noir action thriller film written and directed by Dhanush. Produced by Kalanithi Maran's Sun Pictures, the film stars Dhanush in the titular role, alongside Dushara Vijayan, S. J. Suryah, Sundeep Kishan, Kalidas Jayaram, Selvaraghavan, Prakash Raj, Aparna Balamurali, Varalaxmi Sarathkumar, Saravanan, Dileepan and Divya Pillai. The story follows a food truck owner in North Chennai who struggles to protect his family when they inadvertently get muddled in a war between two rival gangs.

The film was officially announced in January 2023 under the tentative title D50, (Note: The project was also referred under the working title DD2, as it also is Dhanush's second directorial venture.) as it is Dhanush's 50th film as a leading actor, and the official title was announced in February 2024. Principal photography commenced in July 2023 at East Coast Road in Chennai along with Adhitya Ram Studios, where most of the filming took place. This was followed by another schedule held in Karaikudi, and wrapped by mid-December. The film has music composed by A. R. Rahman, cinematography handled by Om Prakash and editing by Prasanna GK.

Raayan was released worldwide on 26 July 2024 in theatres. The film received mixed reviews from critics and grossed over ₹160 crores worldwide, emerging one of the highest-grossing Tamil films of 2024. It later won the National Film Award for Best Tamil Feature Film.

== Plot ==
Kathavaraayan “Raayan” grows up in a village caring for his younger brothers, Manickavelraayan “Manickam” and Muthuvelraayan “Muthu”, and his infant sister Durga after their parents mysteriously disappear. When a priest attempts to abduct Durga, Raayan kills him, forcing the siblings to flee to the city, where a market businessman named Sekhar shelters them.

Years later, Raayan runs a food truck in North Chennai; Manickam attends college; and the hot-headed, alcoholic Muthu pursues a relationship with Meghalai. Sekhar remains a close supporter of the family.

Sethuraman “Sethu” and Durai are rival gangsters whose feud stems from Sethu’s father's murder by Durai. R. Sargunam, a newly transferred police commissioner seeking revenge on Durai for killing his own father, manipulates the rivalry in the hope that both gangs will destroy each other. Sargunam secretly sends goons to attack Sethu, but they are killed. Believing Durai ordered the ambush, Sethu retaliates by targeting Durai’s son at a local bar. Muthu becomes involved in a fight there, and Sethu’s men use the chaos to kill Durai’s son, leaving Muthu as the only survivor. Although most believe Sethu is responsible, Durai learns of Muthu’s involvement and demands that Raayan hand him over within 24 hours. Instead, Raayan and his brothers kill Durai and his gang.

Sethu grows suspicious of the brothers’ involvement and summons Raayan, offering him protection in exchange for joining his side. Raayan refuses, prompting Sethu to threaten him and later attempt to assassinate him. Raayan kills all the attackers. At the same time, he struggles to finance Durga’s wedding, agreeing to provide ₹5 lakhs in expenses and dowry, including surrendering his profitable mobile hotel and the family’s savings to the groom’s family.

Fearing for his family’s safety, Raayan decides to kill Sethu by ambushing him at the home of Sethu’s second wife, Annam. Instead, he discovers Durga tied up there and realises he has been trapped. During the ensuing fight, Sethu’s henchman Guru abducts and sexually assaults Durga. It is also revealed that Manickam and Muthu, unable to find stable employment, have secretly begun working for Sethu to support the household. Horrified to discover that Raayan is their target, they panic and stab him.

Durga rescues the injured Raayan and, with Sekhar’s help, escapes with him to an isolated house outside the city. There, she learns of her brothers’ betrayal. Nearly a year later, after recovering, Raayan kidnaps Annam and demands Guru in exchange for her. Sethu agrees, allowing Durga to kill Guru in revenge.

Manickam later attempts reconciliation and asks Sekhar to arrange a meeting with Raayan, but Sethu overhears the request. When Sekhar refuses to reveal Raayan’s whereabouts, Sethu kills him and publicly displays his body, forcing Raayan and Durga out of hiding. Sargunam arranges a public “compromise” meeting between Raayan and Sethu while secretly planning to kill them all. Instead, he offers Raayan freedom, safety, and new identities if he eliminates Sethu and his gang. During Bhogi celebrations, Durga kills Manickam for betraying Raayan, while Raayan kills Sethu, his gang, and Muthu.

The following day, Sargunam prepares to kill Raayan to conceal their arrangement, but Raayan anticipates the betrayal and does not arrive. Meghalai, unwilling to raise a child connected to Raayan’s bloodline, entrusts her baby to Raayan and Durga. The siblings then leave for Coimbatore to begin a peaceful new life.

== Cast ==
- Dhanush as Kathavaraayan "Raayan"
  - Raghul R. as young Raayan
- S. J. Suryah as Sethuraman "Sethu"
- Sundeep Kishan as Muthuvelraayan "Muthu"
  - Avanish as young Muthu
- Kalidas Jayaram as Manickavelraayan "Manickam"
  - Dhanush Karthik as young Manickam
- Dushara Vijayan as Durga
  - Dharsikha as young Durga
- Selvaraghavan as Sekhar
- Prakash Raj as Commissioner R. Sargunam
- Aparna Balamurali as Meghalai
- Varalaxmi Sarathkumar as Sethu's first wife (cameo appearance)
- Saravanan as Durai
- Dileepan as Guru
- Divya Pillai as Annam Sethuraman
- Ilavarasu as Meghalai's father
- Bose Venkat as Inspector Sengundran
- Dr. Karthik Anjaneyan as K. Anjaneyan
- Devadarshini as Shalini
- Namo Narayana as Jagannathan
- Cell Murugan as Murugan
- Geetha Kailasam as Durai's wife
- Aranthangi Nisha as Sargunam's assistant
- Navin Krubhakar as Ashwin
- Anbu Mayilsamy as Sethu's henchman
- Kiccha Ravi as Raayan's father
- M. Soundarya Saravanan as Raayan's mother

== Production ==
=== Development ===
On 29 December 2017, Dhanush announced that for his second directorial after Pa. Pandi (2017), he would collaborate with Hema Rukmani and Murali Ramasamy, headers of Thenandal Studio Limited. He further stated that he would play the lead and the production would begin the following year. To which, on 7 September 2018, a muhurat puja was held in Chennai. Touted to be a bilingual film released in Tamil and Telugu-languages, it would feature Nagarjuna, Aditi Rao Hydari, S. J. Suryah, R. Sarathkumar and Srikanth. Music composer Sean Roldan, cinematographer Om Prakash and editor Prasanna GK were brought on board. Rukmani stated "It's an impressive story and is Dhanush's dream project that he's had in mind for a long time. He's very passionate about the film and when we heard the script, we understood why", during the press launch of the venture. Tentatively titled DD2, principal photography began the same month.

In early March 2019, some reporters claimed that the venture was shelved, saying it was only shot in few bits, mainly due to the cast's schedule. Others reported that it was not shelved, but was instead put on hold, as Dhanush was busy filming for Asuran (2019). In June 2020, Dhanush's elder brother Selvaraghavan was reported to have been approached by the actor to direct a part of venture, as Dhanush was busy with other commitments. The project was later put on hold. However, it was reported that it would begin after the COVID-19 pandemic ends, which was later proven false. In January 2023, it was reported that instead of reviving the script, Dhanush would write a new script, to be funded by Kalanithi Maran of Sun Pictures. The production house officially announced the project on 18 January, and was tentatively titled D50. The film's official title, Raayan, was revealed on 19 February 2024.

=== Casting ===
Dhanush would sport a tonsured head and stubble with a thick handlebar mustache for his character. Vishnu Vishal was initially attached to act in the film but was unable to commit due to scheduling conflicts; the role went to Sundeep Kishan, reuniting with Dhanush after Captain Miller (2024). Kalidas Jayaram learned the North Chennai dialect for his role, and also trained in Madras Bashai under Dhanush. G. V. Prakash Kumar stated that he was offered to play one of Dhanush's brothers, but declined because of his friendship with Dhanush, and the fact that the character betrays Dhanush's character. Prakash Kumar did not reveal if the role offered was eventually played by Kishan or Kalidas.

S. J. Suryah, who was part of Dhanush's shelved venture, was retained for this project. Varalaxmi Sarathkumar, who acted with Dhanush in Maari 2 (2018), reunited with him for this film. Selvaraghavan had previously written or directed many films starring Dhanush, and Raayan is the first film where he appeared under his brother's direction. He also dismissed rumours of being part of the writing team. Dushara Vijayan called being part of the film a "goal come true moment" as Dhanush was a major inspiration for her to pursue an acting career. Since Aparna Balamurali could not read Tamil, Dhanush wrote her Tamil dialogues in English. Dhanush had initially approached musician Deva to play the antagonist due to his proficiency in the North Chennai dialect; Deva declined due to his lack of interest in acting.

=== Filming ===
Principal photography began with an inaugural puja ceremony on 5 July 2023 at East Coast Road in Chennai with the presence of the film's cast and crew. Filming also went on there for a while, before they moved to a massive set with around 500 houses at Adithya Ram Studios in ECR, Chennai, where the rest of the schedule continued to be shot at. The schedule featured scenes involving Suryah and Sundeep. The second schedule commenced in mid-November in Karaikudi, which went on for a week. The team had invested ₹30 crore (US$3.2 million) in the sets of the backdrop of Royapuram, where the events in the film would mostly take place at. The filming reached near ending, as stated by Dhanush, on 1 October. On 14 December, Dhanush tweeted that filming had wrapped.

=== Post-production ===
Sumesh Gopal and Anish Dayanandan are the visual effects supervisors, under Digital Bricks Entertainment Pvt Ltd, the film's principal visual effects studio. The dubbing began works in late February 2024, and were completed by early March. Musix composer A. R. Rahman concluded the re-recording session on 28 May, which was confirmed by Dhanush through his social media pages.

== Music ==
The music and background score is composed by A. R. Rahman, in his fourth collaboration with Dhanush after Maryan (2013), Raanjhanaa (2013) and Atrangi Re (2021). The first single, "Adangaatha Asuran", was released on 9 May 2024, the second single "Water Packet" on 24 May, and the third single, "Raayan Rumble" released on 5 July. The audio launch was held on 6 July 2024 at Sri Sai Ram Engineering College in Chennai.

== Release ==
=== Theatrical ===
Raayan was initially scheduled to release on 13 June 2024 in theatres, but was postponed for reasons unknown. It was released worldwide on 26 July 2024, two days before Dhanush's 41st birthday. Apart from its original Tamil language, dubbed versions in the Telugu and Hindi languages were also released. The film received an A (adults only) certificate from the Central Board of Film Certification, being the first Dhanush film since Vada Chennai (2018) to do so. It received a 15 rating by the British Board of Film Classification for strong violence and bloody images.

=== Distribution ===
Sun Pictures released the film in Tamil Nadu themselves through Red Giant Movies. Asian Suresh Entertainment acquired the distribution rights of the film in Andhra Pradesh and Telangana for reportedly ₹5 crore. Sree Gokulam Movies bought the distribution rights for Kerala, and AV Media Counsultancy did so for Karnataka. Ayngaran International acquired the overseas distribution rights.

=== Home media ===
The film began streaming on Amazon Prime Video from 23 August 2024 in Tamil, alongside Telugu, Hindi, Malayalam and Kannada languages. It had its television premiere on 31 October the same year at Sun TV.

== Reception ==
=== Box office ===
Raayan grossed ₹23.75 crore (US$2.5 million) worldwide on its opening day, surpassing Karnan (2021) to become the biggest opening for one of Dhanush's film. It grossed an estimated ₹75.42 crore (US$8.1 million) worldwide on its opening weekend of three days. The film earned ₹122.75 crore (US$13 million) in ten days and ₹126.75 crore (US$14 million) in the next two days. By the third weekend film total collection stood at ₹109.50 crore (US$12 million) in India and ₹149 crore (US$16 million) worldwide. Raayan grossed an estimated revenue of ₹160 crore (US$17 million) in its final run, becoming the highest-grossing Tamil film of the year to that point, and the highest-grossing A-certified Tamil film to that point.

=== Critical response ===
Raayan received mixed reviews from critics. Rohit Panikker of Times Now gave 3.5/5 stars and wrote "Raayan is a bloodbath that even the most ardent fan of such blood and gore would find exhausting, especially since it falls in the line of a long spate of recent releases that are similarly-conceived." Divya Nair of Rediff gave 3/5 stars and wrote "Raayan is an interesting one-time watch written for the masses with a little meat here and there for the critics to bite on." M Suganth of The Times of India gave 3/5 stars and wrote "Raayan has a raw and rage-filled setting, and is populated by characters who are rugged, violent, deceptive and also vulnerable." Avinash Ramachandran of The Indian Express gave 3/5 stars and wrote "Dhanush, the actor and director, stands tall in a film powered by AR Rahman's brilliant music, and top-notch performances only to fall just short of realising its potential."

Anusha Sundar of OTTPlay gave 3/5 stars and wrote "[...] Yes, the writing is bogged down by certain uncertainty and convenience, which does not let many characters to get developed, and in fact get eliminated before they are got to known. But Raayan is also a valiant effort of Dhanush's that lets many departments shine through, and plays out a canvas for a experimentation in commercial cinema." Janani K of India Today gave 2.5/5 stars and wrote "Dhanush's 50th film is a simple revenge story. The interval block shows streaks of brilliance of his directorial skills. However, as a writer, 'Raayan' lacks emotional depth. For the revenge angle to work, emotions matter." B. V. S. Prakash of Deccan Chronicle gave 2/5 stars and wrote "Dhanush turned director for this film and relied on gore and violence revolving around a wafer-thin plot. This is truly disappointing since some of his films like Asuran and Karnan had boasted of bold themes in the past." Latha Srinivasan of Hindustan Times wrote "Dhanush's Raayan totally packs a punch and is a must-watch for its captivating performances and unexpected story twists. It's a stellar 50th career film for Dhanush." Bhuvanesh Chandar of The Hindu wrote "In his sophomore directorial, Dhanush attempts to turn an ordinary story into something more with a well-written setting and measured storytelling, but falls disappointingly short."

== Accolades ==
At the 72nd National Film Awards, Raayan won the award for Best Tamil Feature Film. This led to backlash, with detractors feeling that critically better-received films like Maharaja or Meiyazhagan were overlooked. In response, Dhanush admitted there were better Tamil films than Raayan released the same year, adding, "The fans of those films expressed their love, and I fully respect them" but urged people to celebrate his win as an achievement rather than decry it.
