= Natchathiram Nagargiradhu =

- Theatrical release poster
- Directed by: Pa. Ranjith
- Written by: Pa. Ranjith
- Produced by: Vignesh Sundaresan; Manoj Leonel Jahson
- Starring: Kalidas Jayaram; Dushara Vijayan; Kalaiyarasan
- Cinematography: A. Kishor Kumar
- Edited by: Selva R. K.
- Music by: Tenma
- Production companies: Yaazhi Films; Neelam Productions
- Release date: 31 August 2022
- Running time: 170 minutes
- Country: India
- Language: Tamil

Natchathiram Nagargiradhu (transl. The star is moving) is a 2022 Indian Tamil-language romantic musical film directed by Pa. Ranjith, starring Dushara Vijayan, Kalidas Jayaram and Kalaiyarasan. Tenma replaced Ranjith's regular, Santhosh Narayanan, as the music composer for this film.

Natchathiram Nagargiradhu was released worldwide in theatres on 31 August 2022. Dushara Vijayan won the Tamil Nadu State Film Award for Best Actress (Special Prize).

== Plot ==
As a motley theatre troupe sets out to stage a play about love, the drama reaches new heights as attitudes around sexuality and castes begin to clash.

== Cast ==
- Kalidas Jayaram as Iniyan
- Kalaiyarasan as Arjun
- Dushara Vijayan as Rene (Tamizh)
- Sindhuja Viji
- Shabeer Kallarakkal as Sagas Ratchagan
- Geetha Kailasam as Arjun's mother
- Charles Vinoth as Sekar
- Selvaraghavan as Manimaran
- Manisa Tait as Medellin
- Hari Krishnan Anbudurai as Yashvandhiran
- Munishkanth as Donald
- Subatra Robert as Karpagam
- Vinsu Rachel Sam as Roshini
- Lizzie Antony as Indhumathi
- Regin Rose as Subeer
- Gnanaprasad as Ayya Durai
- Sumeet Borana as Dayana
- Arjun as Praveen
- Stephen Raj as Tharu
- Uthaiya Surya as Maru
- Joel as Thakkali Soru
- Sherin Celin Mathew as Sylvia

== Production ==
In 2021, it was reported that Ranjith's next film after the action film Sarpatta Parambarai would be a romance, titled Natchathiram Nagargiradhu. Filming concluded that December. Transgender actress Sherin Celin Mathew, who played Sylvia in the film, died by suicide on 17 May 2022 in Kochi.

== Release ==
=== Theatrical ===
The film was released theatrically on 31 August 2022.

=== Home media ===
The film's streaming rights were bought by Netflix. The film began streaming there from 28 September 2022.

== Reception ==
On the review aggregator website Rotten Tomatoes, 100% of 7 critics' reviews are positive, with an average rating of 6.8/10.

M Suganth of The Times of India rated the film with 3.5/5 stars stating, "Several blending of forms like love, caste, honour killings and music, actually gives the film a vibe that is very new-age, and makes it an experience that shouldn't be missed". Krishna Selvaseelan of Tamil Guardian rated the film 4 out of 5 stars, writing, “‘NN’ is the first chapter of the New Testament for the portrayal of love in Tamil cinema. Pa Ranjith has only continued to impress me with every subsequent film.” Director Anurag Kashyap posted that "the uncensored version of the film is like the director's (Pa.Ranjith) chaotic mind, where so many of his identities are having conversations and conflicting with each other, but want to be in order". Kashyap concluded that it was his favourite film of Ranjith's, so far.
