= Kaantha =

2025 Indian film by Selvamani Selvaraj

- Theatrical release poster
- Directed by: Selvamani Selvaraj
- Written by: Tamizh Prabha; Selvamani Selvaraj
- Produced by: Rana Daggubati; Dulquer Salmaan; Prashanth Potluri; Jom Varghese
- Starring: Dulquer Salman; P. Samuthirakani; Rana Daggubati; Bhagyashri Borse
- Cinematography: Dani Sanchez-Lopez
- Edited by: Llewellyn Anthony Gonsalvez
- Music by: Songs: Jhanu Chanthar; Background Score: Jakes Bejoy
- Production companies: Spirit Media; Wayfarer Films
- Release date: 14 November 2025
- Running time: 163 minutes
- Country: India
- Language: Tamil
- Budget: ₹40 crore
- Box office: ₹35-38.6 crore

Kaantha is a 2025 Indian Tamil-language period crime thriller film directed by Selvamani Selvaraj who co-wrote the script with Thamizh Prabha. The film stars Dulquer Salmaan, Samuthirakani, Rana Daggubati, Bhagyashri Borse and Gayathrie Shankar. The film is the fictionalized work inspired by the life of M. K. Thyagaraja Bhagavathar. It is produced by Daggubati and Salmaan under Spirit Media and Wayfarer Films.

Kaantha was released in theatres worldwide on 14 November 2025 and received acclaim from critics praising Dulquer and Bhagyashri's performance, technical aspects and music. Despite critical acclaim the film couldn't perform well at the box office.

== Plot ==
Set in 1950s Madras, the film revolves around the legendary director Ayya, and his strained relationship with T. K. Mahadevan (Thiruchengode Kalidasa Mahadevan), a film star he helped establish and popularise. Mahadevan is a talented actor who has risen from humble roots to superstardom. He often has ego clashes with Ayya. The film starts with "Modern Studios" owner Martin calling Ayya to his office to tell him that he can start his earlier shelved film 'Shaantha', as financiers have agreed to produce the film as long as Mahadevan is cast as the star. 'Shaantha' is the maiden horror female-centric film based on Ayya's mother.

Initially, Ayya refuses to direct the film with Mahadevan as the lead actor. However, he gives in after Martin convinces him to do it for the sake of the studios. Mahadevan changes the film's name from 'Shaantha' to 'Kaantha' to suit his own image and cater to his fanbase. He also changes the plot of the film, which originally had the hero die in the climax, telling Ayya to sit in a corner and watch as he directs the film instead.

Kumari, a Burmese immigrant, is cast as heroine of the film, a character based on Ayya's mother. In the first joint scene of Kumari and Mahadevan, Kumari asks Ayya to instruct and direct her which hurts Mahadevan's ego. Mahadevan gives a performance which impresses everyone on the set. A flashback shows Ayya criticising Mahadevan for his acting skills the first time the movie was being filmed before it was shelved. Back in the present, Mahadevan sits in the director's chair and takes charge of the film, ignoring Ayya, leading to Kumari scolding him.

In the next scene being shot, in which Mahadevan's and Kumari's characters argue about the husband having an affair, Kumari slaps Mahadevan where the script only has her crying holding Mahadevan's hands. Mahadevan asks Kumari to slap him exactly the same way again. Kumari, feeling guilty, is unable slap him again the same way until several re-takes. Kumari is now upset with Ayya for making her slap Mahadevan. Kumari enquires about why Ayya and his former protégé Mahadevan had a falling out, and over subsequent days she becomes closer to Mahadevan.

One day, a journalist comes to watch and write about Mahadevan and his performance. The journalist writes negatively about how Ayya treats Mahadevan. Enraged fans of Mahadevan attack Ayya, injuring his leg. Ayya and Kumari stop coming to the set. Mahadevan goes to Ayya's house, where Kumari is staying, to try to persuade her to come back to the set, which she refuses out of loyalty to Ayya. Mahadevan discloses that Ayya had him arrested on a false police report when they had an argument the first time the movie was being filmed.

Kumari and Mahadevan develop a romantic relationship. Enraged, Ayya tries to harm Mahadevan on the set of the film. He causes a chandelier fall in one scene, nearly hitting Mahadevan, and also chokes him hard with a rope during filming of a simulated strangulation scene. A real gun with bullets is used in place of a dummy shooting gun which is fired at Mahadevan. Following this, Mahadevan demands that if the film has to be completed, Ayya must leave. Kumari feels bad about this. Mahadevan assures her that they will get married. He asks her if she had told Ayya about their relationship, which she denies. That night, Kumari is shot dead in her room and Ayya is found the next morning sitting next to her corpse.

Inspector Devaraj alias Phoenix is appointed to investigate that matter and takes over the film set. Ayya refuses to talk to the police unless Mahadevan is brought in for questioning. Phoenix burns the climax reel of the film.

Mahadevan states during his interrogation that he truly loved Kumari and wanted to marry her. His wife Devi overhears this as Phoenix had sat her right outside the interview room. Though hurt, she still stands by her husband. Devi's father, a powerful businessman, brings in the Inspector General of Police to end Phoenix's investigation and take Devi and Mahadevan home. However Phoenix arrests Mahadevan for the murder. Following pleas from the crew to allow Mahadevan to shoot the climax portion of the movie so that people remember Kumari as an actress and not as a girl who was killed on a set, Phoenix removes the handcuffs from Mahadevan. Mahadevan acts in the final scene in which his character mourns the death of Kumari's character. Looking at the apparent genuine emotion in his acting, Phoenix tells Mahadevan he is no longer a suspect, and allows him to rest in the actor's room. Ayya enters and also says he no longer suspects Mahadevan of the murder after having seen his genuine grief during the scene. But in a twist, Mahadevan reveals that he did kill Kumari. He reveals that he had found an intimate photo of them together in Kumari's suitcase. He found a recording tape in Ayya's safe, in which Kumari and Ayya appear to be plotting against Mahadevan. After listening to the tape, Mahadevan believed their relationship had been a lie, and that Kumari had just been pretending to be in love with him on Ayya's orders in order to blackmail him, and so murdered Kumari to prevent Ayya from winning.

After an emotional discussion, Ayya states that they are both losers, revealing that there is more to the tape and that Kumari is actually innocent. Ayya commits suicide by shooting himself. Mahadevan goes home and listens to the tape to the end, realising that he had misunderstood the situation and that Kumari had genuinely loved Mahadevan. Shattered he bashes his head onto the mirror. But wakes up and returns to the studio to release the film as "Shaantha" as Ayya had wanted and making Kumari a recognised actress.

== Cast ==
- Dulquer Salmaan as Thiruchengode Kalidasa Mahadevan "TKM" (based on M. K. Thyagaraja Bhagavathar)
- Samuthirakani as TPK "Ayya", Mahadevan's and Kumari's mentor and Director for Kaantha
- Rana Daggubati as Inspector Devaraj alias "Phoenix"
- Bhagyashri Borse as Kumari, Mahadevan's Burmese Tamil love interest (voice dubbed by Savitha Reddy)
- Gayathrie Shankar as Devi, Mahadevan's wife
- Nizhalgal Ravi as Sivalingam Mudaliar, Devi's father and Mahadevan's father-in-law
- Ravindra Vijay as Martin Prabhakaran
- Bagavathi Perumal as Constable Kaathu
- Vaiyapuri as Selvam
- Tamizhselvi as Rani
- Bijesh Nagesh as Babu
- Aadukalam Naren as IG Chakravarthy Pandian

== Production ==
=== Development ===
In late-July 2023, Dulquer Salmaan was announced to join hands with Selvamani Selvaraj in a period film set in the 1950s in Madras. The film was announced to jointly be produced by Rana Daggubati and Salmaan under their Spirit Media and Wayfarer Films banners respectively. Apart from Salmaan, the film stars Samuthirakani and Bhagyashri Borse in other prominent roles, while also marking the latter's Tamil debut. The technical team consists of Spanish cinematographer Dani Sanchez-Lopez who earlier worked in Mahanati (2018), editor Llewellyn Anthony Gonsalvez and the background score is composed by Jakes Bejoy while the songs have been composed by Jhanu Chanthar.

=== Filming ===
Production began on 9 August 2024 at Rama Naidu Studios in Hyderabad with the inaugural clap given by Venkatesh Daggubati.

== Marketing ==
The film announcement was made by Rana Daggubati by sharing a first-look poster coinciding with Dulquer Salmaan's birthday in 2023. Coinciding Salmaan's 13-years in the film industry, a character-reveal first-look poster was released. On Valentines Day of 2025, the lead actress, Bhagyashri Borse's poster was released. On 26 April 2025, coinciding Samuthirakani's birthday, a similar character-reveal poster of him, playing the role as Ayya was released. Coinciding Salmaan's birth anniversary in 2025, the teaser was released to garner positive reviews. Through the teaser, Salmaan was revealed to play the role of an actor Chandran in the film. The trailer was released on 6 November 2025.

== Music ==
Kaantha

Soundtrack album by Jhanu Chanthar
- Released: December 16, 2025
- Genre: Feature film soundtrack
- Language: Tamil
- Label: Aditya Music
- Producer: Jhanu Chanthar

Jhanu Chanthar chronology
Vezham (2022)	Kaantha (2025)

Singles from Kaantha
- 1. "Panimalare" Released: 9 August 2025; 2. "Kanmani Nee" Released: 22 October 2025; 3. "Rage Of Kaantha" Released: 30 October 2025

External audio
- Kaantha (Tamil ) Audio Jukebox on YouTube
- Kaantha (Telugu) Audio Jukebox on YouTube

The background score is composed by Jakes Bejoy while the songs have been composed by Jhanu Chanthar in his third collaboration with Selvamani Selvaraj after Nila and The Hunt for Veerappan. The first single titled "Panimalare" in Tamil and "Pasi Manase" in Telugu was released on 9 August 2025. The second single titled "Kanmani Nee" in Tamil and "Ammadive" in Telugu was released on 22 October 2025. The third trilingual single titled "Rage Of Kaantha" jointly written and performed in English, Tamil and Telugu was released on 30 October 2025.

Tamil
No.	Title	Lyrics	Singer(s)	Length
1.	"Panimalare"	Kutti Revathi	Pradeep Kumar, Priyanka NK
2.	"Kanmani Nee"	Deepika Karthik Kumar	Pradeep Kumar
3.	"Rage Of Kaantha"	Lunarpunk, Yogi B, Devoid, AbhinavaKavi	Siddharth Basrur, Yogi B, AbhinavaKavi
4.	"Karmugil Kannazhago"	Sivam	Pradeep Kumar
5.	"Maanda Mannan Kaviyam"	Kaber Vasuki	Sanjay

Telugu
No.	Title	Lyrics	Singer(s)	Length
1.	"Pasi Manase"	Krishna Kanth	Pradeep Kumar, Priyanka NK
2.	"Ammadive"	Krishna Kanth	Pradeep Kumar
3.	"Rage Of Kaantha"	Lunarpunk, Yogi B, Devoid, AbhinavaKavi	Siddharth Basrur, Yogi B, AbhinavaKavi
4.	"Kaatuka Kannulavo"	Krishna Kanth	Sreerama Chandra
5.	"Kaalipoye Kaavyam"	Krishna Kanth	Kaala Bhairava

== Release ==
=== Theatrical ===
Kaantha was released in theatres worldwide on 14 November 2025 in Tamil and Telugu. The release was initially slated on 12 September 2025, but was postponed without announcing a new release date. In a joint statement, Dulquer and Rana Daggubati announced that the release of Kaantha was postponed in order to allow Lokah Chapter 1: Chandra (2025) to continue its successful run. In Malaysia, the film was distributed by DMY Creation.

=== Home media ===
The film was streaming on Netflix from 12 December 2025.

== Reception ==
Abhinav Subramanian of The Times of India gave 4/5 stars and wrote "Where Kaantha stumbles is in its transparency. Red herrings get tossed around, but once the pieces align, the trajectory feels obvious. There's also a curious lack of discretion in how the affair unfolds. [...] The film knows it's trafficking in archetypes and classical mechanics, and instead of trying to subvert them, it just plays them straight with enough craft to make the old moves land. Sometimes commitment beats cleverness." Kaushik Rajaraman of DT Next gave 3.5/5 stars and wrote "Kaantha is the film that the Tamil industry badly wanted to sign off the year on a good note. For movie buffs, who have been closely following the actors in the 50s and even today, Kaantha strikes the right chord." Anandu Suresh of The Indian Express gave 3/5 stars and wrote "The Selvamani Selvaraj directorial stands as a testament to the outstanding showmanship of Dulquer Salmaan, Samuthirakani, and Bhagyashri Borse, with Dulquer delivering one of the finest performances of his career."

Avinash Ramachandran of Cinema Express gave 3/5 stars and wrote "Dulquer Salmaan's Kaantha is really held together by superlative performances and the superior production value of the film, which makes you forgive a fair share of flaws." Goutham S of Pinkvilla gave 3/5 stars and wrote "Kaantha is an engaging watch when it remains a period drama. But once it transitions into an investigative thriller, it struggles to maintain the same impact and loses sight of key elements introduced in the first half." Neeshita Nyayapati of Hindustan Times gave 3/5 stars and wrote "Kaantha, much like the film industry it is set in, has much to offer in terms of dizzying fame, passionate affairs and unchecked ego. However, the highs and lows of the film seem starkly in contrast, [...] It’s the performances that make the uneven tone of the film worthwhile."

Anusha Sundar of OTT Play gave 2.5/5 stars and wrote "Kaantha is anchored well with some great performances poured in by Dulquer, Bhagyashri, and others, but the gaps in writing, are evident too. The imbalance lays the film bare of its shortcomings, standing tall between enjoying the indulgent path it takes." Janani K of India Today gave 2.5/5 stars and wrote "Powerful performances and excellent making see the film soar, and then plummet when it becomes an investigation drama." Sangeetha Devi Dundoo of The Hindu wrote "Kaantha is sincere and compelling in parts, which helps balance the portions that feel less fully realised."

== Box office ==
In Malaysia, the film opened at 7th place at the box office.
