= Tourist Family =

2025 Tamil film by Abishan Jeevinth

- Theatrical release poster
- Directed by: Abishan Jeevinth
- Written by: Abishan Jeevinth
- Produced by: Pasilian Nazerath; Magesh Raj Pasilian; Yuvaraj Ganesan
- Starring: M. Sasikumar; Simran; Mithun Jai Sankar; Kamalesh Jagan
- Cinematography: Aravind Viswanathan
- Edited by: Barath Vikraman
- Music by: Sean Roldan
- Production companies: Million Dollar Studios; MRP Entertainment
- Release dates: 29 April 2025 (India); 1 May 2025 (worldwide)
- Running time: 128 minutes
- Country: India
- Language: Tamil
- Budget: est. ₹7 crore (Note: The overall budget, including marketing costs, was estimated at ₹16 crore (equivalent to ₹17 crore or US$1.8 million in 2026).)
- Box office: est. ₹90 crore

Tourist Family is a 2025 Indian Tamil-language comedy drama film written and directed by Abishan Jeevinth, in his directorial debut. Produced by Million Dollar Studios and MRP Entertainment, the film stars M. Sasikumar, Simran, Mithun Jai Sankar and Kamalesh Jagan as a Sri Lankan Tamil family who, following the Sri Lankan economic crisis, illegally immigrate to India, but must hide from law enforcement. Yogi Babu, Ramesh Thilak, M. S. Bhaskar, Elango Kumaravel, Sreeja Ravi and Bagavathi Perumal portray supporting roles.

Development began in September 2024, when Million Dollar Studios and MRP Entertainment announced an untitled project by Abishan, and the official title was announced that December. Principal photography took place primarily in Chennai over 35 working days, wrapping by early January 2025. The film has music composed by Sean Roldan, cinematography handled by Aravind Viswanathan and editing by Barath Vikraman.

Tourist Family premiered on 29 April 2025, and released theatrically on 1 May. The film received positive reviews and grossed approximately ₹90 crore (equivalent to ₹93 crore or US$9.9 million in 2026) worldwide against an estimated production budget of ₹7 crore (equivalent to ₹7.2 crore or US$770,000 in 2026), becoming the seventh highest-grossing Tamil film of 2025 and one of the most profitable Indian films of 2025. The film emerged one of four Indian films amongst 201 films eligible for the Academy Award for Best Picture in 2026.

== Plot ==
Following the economic crisis in Sri Lanka, a Tamil family of four – Dharmadas "Das", his wife Vasanthi, and their sons Nithushan "Nithu" and Murali "Mulli" – flee their native Jaffna, via Valvettithurai, and seek refuge in India through Rameswaram, with the help of Vasanthi's brother, Prakash. As they illegally enter the country, a group of police constables, led by A. Bhairavan, apprehend the family but release them after realising their innocence. Nithu and Mulli emotionally appeal to Bhairavan's compassion by showing him a puppy they found on the shore, pretending it is their pet.

The family, along with Prakash, arrive at a neighbourhood in Chennai, where they pose as Malayalis to Inspector Raghavan, who leases the vacant floor of his house to them. Das soon finds a temporary job as a driver for his neighbour, Richard. Despite Prakash's warnings to keep a low profile due to their distinct Sri Lankan Tamil dialect, Das and Vasanthi become closer to their neighbours despite their fear of being exposed. Vasanthi befriends Mangaiyarkarasi, an elderly woman, and her husband, Gunasekar.

In Rameswaram, a bomb blast occurs, which Balwan Singh, a ruthless ACP, starts investigating. Bhairavan's associates want to inform Balwan about Das and his family, who they believe infiltrated India. CCTV footage showing Das disposing of waste in a dustbin near the blast site, is retrieved. However, Bhairavan, who likes the family, prevents his colleagues from revealing their identity to Balwan. During an interrogation, Balwan severely beats a suspect, who is later hospitalised. At risk of being arrested if the suspect dies, Balwan is under immense pressure to find the actual culprits behind the bomb blast.

Raghavan's daughter, Kural, is in a relationship with a boyfriend who secretly visits their house. However, Nithu mistakes him for a thief and apprehends him. During the ensuing argument, Kural discovers her boyfriend's infidelity and thanks Nithu for unintentionally revealing his true character. In turn, he opens up about the fact that he left Sri Lanka and his dismay towards his father for uprooting their family and seeking refuge in India. Das reveals he discarded the puppy, leading to a heated argument. Nithu and Das have a fight where he expresses his frustration about his menial jobs in Chennai. Eventually, they come to understand each other and start communicating again. A disheartened Nithu, who found that his girlfriend had married someone else, is cheered up by his family.

In Rameswaram, Balwan and Bhairavan investigate Das' family to avoid departmental punishment. They trace the family through a taxi they hired from Rameswaram. When Mangaiyarkarasi dies from the shock of her husband dying, who was revealed to be sleeping, Das rallies the neighbours to attend her last rites. Richard terminates Das's temporary job but reappoints him when he reveals his true identity as a Sri Lankan. Kural develops feelings for Nithu, and they grow closer.

At Mangaiyarkarasi's funeral, the entire neighbourhood pays their respects. An alcoholic youth, previously considered troublesome, speaks up, thanking Das for saving his life. He shares his emotional story of how his mother had Alzheimer's disease and eventually died, making him suicidal and alcoholic. Das unintentionally saved him from a poisoning attempt and showed genuine concern for his well-being. The youth, now sober, apologises for past troubles and bids farewell as he is leaving for Dubai. The neighbourhood, which previously judged him harshly, appreciates his story and holds Das in high esteem. They learn about Das and his family's true identity as Sri Lankan refugees, bonding with them.

Just as the neighbourhood is coming together, Balwan, Bhairavan, and their team arrive, conducting a house-to-house search to apprehend Das's family. However, when they finally reach Das's house, Bhairavan claims they are not the family he met earlier in Rameswaram. Balwan is frustrated, having failed to close the case, and leaves abruptly due to an arrest warrant issued against him as the suspect has died. Das confronts Bhairavan about his deception, and Bhairavan reveals that the whole neighbourhood refused to disclose Das and his family's true identity. Moreover, the entire colony spoke in the Sri Lankan Tamil dialect to help Das's family escape the police investigation. The puppy returns to Das' family.

== Cast ==
- M. Sasikumar as Dharmadas "Das"
- Simran as Vasanthi (voice dubbed by Savitha Radhakrishnan)
- Yogi Babu as Prakash
- Ramesh Thilak as A. Bhairavan
- M. S. Bhaskar as Richard
- Elango Kumaravel as Gunasekar
- Sreeja Ravi as Mangaiyarkarasi
- Bagavathi Perumal as Inspector R. Raghavan
- Mithun Jai Sankar as Nithushan "Nithu"
- Kamalesh Jagan as Murali "Mulli"
- Ajit Koshy as Commissioner N. Udhai Sankar IPS
- Soundarya Saravanan as Raghavan's wife
- Ramkumar Prasanna as ACP R. Balwan Singh IPS
- Porkodi Senthil as Kavitha
- Abishan Jeevinth as the alcoholic youth
- Sudarshan Gandhi as Mulli's teacher
- Yogalakshmi as Kural
- S. Rajapandi as Constable Murugan

== Production ==
=== Development ===
On 28 September 2024, Million Dollar Studios announced an untitled project, written and directed by Abishan Jeevinth in his debut, which was to begin filming in October. The film was jointly produced by Nazerath Pasilian, Magesh Raj Pasilian, Yuvaraj Ganesan under Million Dollar Studios and MRP Entertainment banners. The technical team includes cinematographer Aravind Viswanathan, editor Barath Vikraman and art director Raj Kamal. The official title Tourist Family was announced on 6 December 2024.

=== Casting and filming ===
M. Sasikumar was cast as the lead actor as the director felt he had the innocence required for the role. He cast Simran because he liked her handling of humour. Abhishan, besides directing, also portrayed a supporting role. Yogalakshmi, known for her role in the television series Heart Beat, made her film debut with Tourist Family. Mithun Jai Sankar, a Malayalam actor, made his Tamil debut with this film, and was contacted by Million Dollar Studios only five months after the release of his debut, the Malayalam film Aavesham (2024). Unfamiliar with the Tamil language, he spent two weeks preparing for his role, particularly being able to speak in the Sri Lankan Tamil dialect. Principal photography took place in a set erected in Chennai in a single schedule of 35 days and wrapped on 2 January 2025. Earlier, on 14 December 2024, it was announced that the dubbing process had begun and was simultaneously in the post-production stage.

== Soundtrack ==
Tourist Family

Soundtrack album by Sean Roldan
- Released: April 23, 2025
- Genre: Feature film soundtrack
- Length: 25:49
- Language: Tamil
- Label: Think Music
- Producer: Sean Roldan

Sean Roldan chronology
Bottle Radha (2025)	Tourist Family (2025)	Love Marriage (2025)

Singles from Tourist Family
- 1. "Mugai Mazhai" Released: 21 February 2025; 2. "Aachaley" Released: 16 April 2025

External audio
- Tourist Family – Jukebox on YouTube

The soundtrack and background is scored by Sean Roldan. The first single "Mugai Mazhai" released on 21 February 2025. The second single "Aachaley" released on 16 April 2025.

All lyrics are written by Mohan Rajan.

Track listing
No.	Title	Singer(s)	Length
1.	"Aachaley"	Sean Roldan	3:25
2.	"Vaazhndhu Paaru"	S. P. Charan	3:38
3.	"Iragey"	Vijay Yesudas	3:43
4.	"Iragey Reprise"	Venkatramanan	3:23
5.	"Mugai Mazhai"	Sean Roldan, Saindhavi	3:51
6.	"Maname"	Manoj Krishna, Sean Roldan	3:24
7.	"Ore Vaanam"	Yuvan Shankar Raja, Meha Agarwal	4:25
Total length:			25:49

== Release ==
=== Theatrical ===
Tourist Family premiered on 29 April 2025, and was theatrically released on 1 May 2025. In the United Kingdom, it was screened in Superscreen, becoming the first small-budget Tamil film to achieve this distinction.

=== Home media ===
The film began streaming on JioHotstar from 2 June 2025.

== Reception ==
=== Box office ===
In India, Tourist Family was released alongside Retro, Raid 2 and HIT: The Third Case. The film grossed ₹2 crore (equivalent to ₹2.1 crore or US$220,000 in 2026) domestically on its opening day. On the fourth day of release, the film emerged the highest-grossing film of Sasikumar in overseas. At the end of the first week, Tourist Family had earned ₹23 crore (equivalent to ₹24 crore or US$2.5 million in 2026) worldwide. By mid-May the film had crossed ₹50 crore (equivalent to ₹52 crore or US$5.5 million in 2026) worldwide. As per the American box office revenue tracker Box Office Mojo, Tourist Family earned around ₹4.7 crore (US$500,000) from Norway, United Arab Emirates, United Kingdom, Australia and New Zealand. It ended its theatrical run with approximately ₹90 crore (equivalent to ₹93 crore or US$9.9 million in 2026) worldwide, and the trade considered it the most profitable Indian film of 2025 given the estimated ₹7 crore (equivalent to ₹7.2 crore or US$770,000 in 2026) production budget.

=== Critical response ===
Tourist Family received positive reviews from critics, with particular praise for Abishan's direction and Roldan's score, as well as the performance of Sasikumar, Simran, Kamalesh and Yogi Babu.

Anusha Sundar of OTTPlay gave 3.5/5 stars and wrote, "Director Abishan Jeevinth skillfully explores themes of humanity and connection amid adversity, showcasing a diverse ensemble cast that delivers impactful performances." Avinash Ramachandran of The Indian Express gave 3.5/5 stars and wrote, "The Sasikumar-Simran starrer scores heavily on the humour front, and these moments also make you think of how willing audiences are just to forget everything and laugh with a film that also makes them think a lot." Jayabhuvaneshwari B of Cinema Express gave 3.5/5 stars and wrote "A deceptively light film that juggles grief, humour, and warmth in equal measure, powered by Sasikumar's deeply humane performance and a cast that embodies the messy goodness of everyday people."

Latha Srinivasan of Hindustan Times gave 3.5/5 stars and wrote, "Tourist Family is a wonderful tale from Abishan Jeevinth which reiterates, yet again, that one must love one's neighbour and humanity above all." Abhinav Subramanian of The Times of India gave 2.5/5 stars and wrote, "Tourist Family is a gentle look at the challenges of starting over, even if the narrative feels somewhat formulaic." Srinivasa Ramanujam of The Hindu wrote, "In a cinema dominated by loud guns and mushy romances, Tourist Family comes as a breath of fresh air." Prathyusha Parasuraman of The Hollywood Reporter India wrote, "Despite the forceful sweetness in tone, the film's visual language is cool, clean, and distant. It frames patiently, all the joys and anxieties. There is not much movement of the camera".

== Festival screenings ==
Festival	Section	Screening Dates	Notes	Ref.
Chennai International Film Festival	Tamil Feature Film Competition	15 December 2025	–	

== Accolades ==
Year	Award ceremony	Category	Nominee(s)	Result	Ref.
2025	Chennai International Film Festival	Best Actor (Male) – Tamil	M. Sasikumar	Won	
2025	Chennai International Film Festival	Best Feature Film – Tamil	Tourist Family	2^{nd}	
2026	14th South Indian International Movie Awards	Best Tamil Actress	Simran	Won	
2026	14th South Indian International Movie Awards	Best Tamil Singer (Male)	Vijay Yesudas	Won	
2026	14th South Indian International Movie Awards	Special Appreciation	M. Sasikumar	Won	

== See also ==
- Portrayals of Sri Lankan Tamils in Indian cinema
