= Uma Devi =

Indian lyricist, poet, and academic (born 1983)

Uma Devi K
- Born: Uma Devi; 3 September; Vandavasi, Tiruvannamalai, Tamil Nadu, India
- Occupations: Poet; Lyricist; Writer; Assistant Professor; Doctorate (Ph.D)
- Writing career
- Pen name: Munaivar

Uma Devi (also credited as Umadevi or Uma Devi K) is an Indian poet, lyricist, writer and professor who works predominantly in the Tamil film industry.

She gained wider recognition for her lyrics in films such as Kabali (2016), Aramm (2017), 96 (2018), Raatchasan (2018), NGK (2019), Kaala (2018), Blue Star (2024) and Thangalaan (2025). She has won Filmfare Award for Best Lyricist – Tamil for the song "Yaaro Ivan Yaaro" from Meiyazhagan.

== Early life ==
Uma Devi was born in Athipakkam village in Vandavasi taluk of Tiruvannamalai district, Tamil Nadu. She completed her schooling and undergraduate studies in her hometown and later became a professor and research scholar, with interests that include Dalit identity, feminism, Buddhism and social justice.

She belongs to a family with a strong interest in literature and public issues, and her early reading and writing exposed her to Tamil poetry and political thought, which later influenced her song-writing.

== Career ==
Uma Devi initially wrote poems and essays on Dalit identity, women’s issues, and politics before transitioning into film lyric writing. Her entry into Tamil cinema came through opportunities to write for socially conscious films, beginning with Pa Ranjith's Madras. She has since worked with composers such as Santhosh Narayanan, Govind Vasantha, G. V. Prakash Kumar.

She has written lyrics for a wide range of genres, from political and mass songs to intimate romantic numbers and lullabies. In interviews, she has spoken about breaking the stereotype that women lyricists write only love songs and about bringing the voices of marginalized communities into mainstream cinema.

== Filmography ==
Year	Film	Music Director	Songs
2014	Madras	Santhosh Narayanan	"Naan Nee"
2015	Innimey Ippadithaan	Santhosh Dhayanidhi	"Azhaga Aanazhaga"
2015	Maya	Ron Yohann	"Naanae Varuvaen"
2015	Adhyan	Hari G Rajasekar	"Kadal Thaandi Vesum", "Anbe Minanjal Vanam"
2016	Kabali	Santhosh Narayanan	"Maya Nadhi", "Veera Thurandhara"
2017	Uru	Johan Shevanesh	"Vidiyal Thedi"
2017	Adangathey	G. V. Prakash	"Yaaradi Neril Thondrum"
2017	Magalir Mattum	Ghibran	"Adi Vaadi Thimiraa"
2017	Adhe Kangal	Ghibran	"Idho Thaanaagave"
2017	Theeran Adhigaaram Ondru	Ghibran	"O Sathiye"
2017	Aramm	Ghibran	"Thoranam Aayiram", "Pudhu Varalaare","Anaikum thuniyil"
2017	Thappu Thanda	Naren Balakumar	"Mughaye Ven Mughaye", "Thadak Thadak"
2017	Kattappava Kanom	Santhosh Dhayanidhi	"Hey Penne"
2018	96	Govind Vasantha	"Vasantha Kaalangal", "Thaabangale", "Iravingu Theevai"
2018	Raatchasan	Ghibran	"Kaadhal Kadal Dhana"
2018	Nagesh Thiraiyarangam	Srikanth Deva	"Kadhal Nilaithane"
2018	Jarugandi	Bobo Shashi	"Yaaradi Nee"
2018	Adangathey	G.V. Prakash	"Yaaradi Neril Thondrum"
2018	Kaala	Santhosh Narayanan	"Kannamma"
2019	NGK	Santhosh Narayanan	"Anbe Peranbe"
2019	Irandam Ulagaporin Kadaisi Gundu	Tenma	"Nilamellam", "Irul Vaanam", "Iruchi"
2019	Nerkonda Paarvai	Yuvan Shankar Raja	"Vaanil Irul"
2019	Pancharaaksharam	K. S. Sundaramurthy	"Destiney"
2020	Ettuthikkum Para	M. S. Sreekanth	"Vaadi Chellam"
2020	Ponmagal Vandhal	Govind Vasantha	"Kalaigiradhey Kanave", "Vaan Thooralgal", "Vaanamani Naan", "Vaa pogalam"
2020	Pattas	Vivek-Mervin	"Pudhu Suriyan"
2020	God Father	Naviin Ravindren; Vibin R	"Chella Kannanai"
2020	Walter	Dharmaprakash	"Kannil Vazhiyum Endhan"
2021	Navarasa (web series)	Justin Prabhakaran	"Kannunjal"
2021	Kadaseela Biriyani	Neil Sebastian & Judah Paul	"Aarariro", "Kadaseela Kadavul"
2021	Sangathalaivan	Robert Sargunam	"Pudhu Vidha", "Porattam Illamal"
2021	Kuthiraivaal	Pradeep Kumar	"Pogum Vazhigal", "Unnaivandhu Adaiyava"
2021	Velan	Gopi Sundar	"Ennai Aalum Pennilave"
2021	Annabelle Sethupathi	Krishna Kishor	"Vaanil Pogum Megham"
2021	Vellai Yaanai	Santhosh Narayanan	"Vennila"
2022	Anel Meley Pani Thuli	Santhosh Narayanan	"Yedhu Naan Inge"
2022	Kathir	Prashant Pillai	"Naandhaana Naan Needhaana", "Naan Pookalaalae Unnai"
2022	Clap	Ilayaraaja	"Unnai Keta"
2022	Koorman	Tony Britto	"Varayaadha Oviyam", "Aambal Poo Ena"
2022	Natchathiram Nagargiradhu	Tenma	"Janamey", "Perinba Kadhal", "Kadhalar"
2023	Raththam	Kannan Narayanan	"Nee Ennai Mannipaya"
2023	Farhana	Justin Prabhakaran	"Farhana", "Orr Kadhal Kanaa"
2023	Takkar	Nivas K. Prasanna	"Maragadha Maalai"
2024	Captain Miller	G. V. Prakash	"Koranaaru (Tamil)"
2024	Blue Star	Govind Vasantha	"Railin Oligal"
2024	J Baby	Tony Britto	"Nedumaram"
2024	Meiyazhagan	Govind Vasantha	"Yaaro Ivan Yaaro", "Poraen Naa Poraen"
2024	Andhagan	Santhosh Narayanan	"Kannile", "The Andhagan Anthem"
2024	Thangalaan	G.V. Prakash	"Minikki Minikki", "Aruvadai"
2024	Garudan	Yuvan Shankar Raja	"Kannil Kodi", "Iruthiyai Nee"
2024	Singapore Saloon	Vivek–Mervin	"Paal Veedhiyil"
2025	Madraskaaran	Sam C. S.	"Yeandi"
2025	Kaadhal Enbadhu Podhu Udamai	Kannan Narayanan	"Theeyai"
2025	Bottle Radha	Sean Roldan	"En Vanam"
2025	Vallan	Santhosh Dhayanidhi	"Kanjaadai Poova"
2025	Thandakaaranyam	Justin Prabhakaran	"Adiye Alangaari", "Kaava Kaade"
2025	DNA	Sathyaprakash	"Vaa En Uyir Poove"
2026	Lucky the Superstar	"Niraa Maya	
2026	Carmeni Selvam	Musicloud Studio and Technologies	"Ennai En"
2026	Kara	G. V. Prakash Kumar	"Thaazham Poove"

== Awards ==
Year	Awards	Host	Note
2015	Mirchi Music Award	Radio Mirchi	Best Upcoming Lyricist - 2014
2015	Big Tamil Melody Award	Zee Tamil & Big FM	Best Upcoming Lyricist - 2014
2017	Tamilan Award	Puthiya Thalaimurai	Sirantha Nambikkai Natchathiram -Literature
2017	Behindwoods Gold Medal	Behindwoods	Song: Mayanathi Movie: Kabali
2017	Norve – Tamilar Award	8th NORVE Tamil Film Festival	Song: Mayanathi Movie: Kabali
2017	Vikatan Aval Award	Vikatan	Top 10 Tamil Women's of the year
2018	Devi Award	New Indian Express	Women’s Awards For Dynamism & Innovation
2018	Vijay Awards	Vijay TV	Song: Thoranam Aayiram Film: Aramm
2019	Femina Award	India Today	
2025	Black Sheep Cine Awards	Black Sheep	
2025	SIIMA Awards	13th South Indian International Movie Awards	Song: Poraen Naa Poraen Film: Meiyazhagan
2026	Filmfare Awards South	70th Filmfare Awards South	Song: Yaaro ivan yaaro Film: Meiyazhagan
