= Parari =

Parari may refer to:

- Parari, Buxar, a village in Buxar district, Bihar, India
- Parari, Paraíba, a municipality in Paraíba, Brazil
- Parari (2013 film), an Indian Kannada-language film
- Parari (2024 film), an Indian Tamil-language film by Ezhil Periyavedi
- Muhsin Parari, Indian film director, writer and lyricist
- Parrari, or Parari, a terrorist outfit founded by Sher Mohammad Marri in 1962
