= Vettuvam =

Upcoming Indian film by Pa. Ranjith

- Theatrical release poster
- Directed by: Pa. Ranjith
- Written by: Pa. Ranjith; Santhosh Naryanan Chenthilkumar; Franklin Jacob (dialogues)
- Produced by: S. Sai Devanand; S. Sai Venkateswaran; Pa. Ranjith
- Starring: Arya; V R Dinesh; Sobhita Dhulipala; Kalaiyarasan; Shabeer Kallarakkal
- Cinematography: Roopesh Shaji
- Edited by: Selva R K
- Music by: G. V. Prakash Kumar
- Production companies: Learn and Teach Productions; Neelam Productions
- Release date: January 2027
- Country: India
- Language: Tamil
- Budget: ₹75 crore

Vettuvam (transl. Hunting) is an upcoming Indian Tamil-language science fiction sports action film directed by Pa. Ranjith, who co-wrote the screenplay with Santhosh Naryanan Chenthilkumar and Franklin Jacob. The film stars Arya, V R Dinesh, Sobhita Dhulipala, Kalaiyarasan and Shabeer Kallarakkal leading an ensemble cast.

Ranjith began developing Vettuvam through his production company Neelam Productions in collaboration with Golden Ratio Films, with V R Dinesh attached as lead. The project was officially announced in May 2022 as a rural gangster film, but was later reworked into a futuristic science fiction film. Arya, Dhulipala, Kalaiyarasan and Shabeer joined the cast in 2024–2025. Principal photography began in March 2025 in Tamil Nadu and continued through 2026. The film has music composed by G. V. Prakash Kumar, cinematography handled by Roopesh Shaji and editing by Selva R K.

Vettuvam is scheduled to be released worldwide in January 2027 in theatres.

== Cast ==
- Arya as Dharmarajan
- V R Dinesh as Nandhan
- Sobhita Dhulipala as Radhi
- Kalaiyarasan as Veeravarman
- Shabeer Kallarakkal as Sembiyan
- Mime Gopi
- Guru Somasundaram
- John Vijay
- Sai Dheena
- Anandsami
- Harish Uthaman
- Lizzie Antony
- Lingesh
- Prem Kumar
- Kavitha Bharathi
- Arjun
- Santha Kumar
- Melody
- Manisha
- Nimmy Raphael
- Vikram
- Naveen
- Prakash

== Production ==
=== Development ===
Vettuvam was first publicly revealed at the 75th Cannes Film Festival in May 2022, when Pa. Ranjith unveiled the film's first-look poster. At that point, Ranjith was writer and director, and the project being produced through his Neelam Productions in collaboration with Golden Ratio Films. The producers named at the time were Abhayanand Singh, Piiyush Singh and Ashwini Choudhary of Golden Ratio, together with Ranjith and Aditi Anand's Neelam Productions. The original plan was for the film to begin filming later in 2022 and to release in 2023. Those dates did not materialise. The film was described as a rural gangster drama film. Ranjith described the central character as an ordinary daily-wage labourer who rises to a position of power. Cinema Express reported that it was being developed as a linked feature film and television series, with the feature intended to be released first. Silverscreen India also reported the same, saying the film was being developed as both a Tamil film and a web series and was expected begin productoin in late 2022.

The project was delayed. Despite the original 2022/23 schedule, Vettuvam did not enter production then. By June 2024, the film was reportedly still in the scripting stage. At that point, Ranjith was simultaneously working around the release of Thangalaan (2024), and Vettuvam was being positioned as his next project. A May 2025 The Times of India report said the film had been put on hold since its introduction at Cannes as Ranjith wanted to concentrate heavily on Thangalaan. In September 2025, Ranjith explained that the film had undergone a major creative transformation. He said that he had initially written Vettuvam as a gangster film, but during the writing process he began questioning what he actually wanted to say. The subject remained connected to power-sharing, but he eventually decided that the original gangster milieu no longer interested him. He therefore kept the characters but changed their world completely, transforming the film into a science fiction and futuristic drama. In its initial stage, the production budget was set at ₹25 crore (US$2.7 million); however, after the script was reworked, it was increased to ₹75 crore (US$8.0 million).

=== Pre-production ===
Ranjith continued developing the screenplay considerably after the Cannes announcement. The eventual screenplay credits are Ranjith, Santhosh Narayanan Chenthilkumar and dialogue writer Franklin Jacob. Ranjith said he took the characters from the originally conceived gangster story and built a new world around them. The new version became a science fiction and futuristic drama. This eventually resulted in the film spanning three periods.

The final technical team included cinematographer Roopesh Shaji, editor Selva RK, art director S. S. Murthi, action choreographer Dhilip Subbarayan, music composer G. V. Prakash Kumar, sound designer Anthony B. J. Ruban, sound mixer G. Suren, choreographer Sandy, costume designers Anitha Sundaresan, Naushad Ahmed and Varshini Sankar, and make-up artist Kalaiyazhagan.

=== Casting ===
The first major actor associated with the project was V R Dinesh, whom Ranjith had previously directed in Attakathi (2012). By June 2024, reports identified Dinesh as one of the leads. Dinesh eventually became the film's principal lead and later changed his professional name from Dinesh Ravi to V R Dinesh, with the change being publicly associated with Vettuvam. In September 2025, a birthday promotional video showed Dinesh performing martial-arts movements and revealed a dramatically different appearance for the film.

In June 2024, it was reported that Ranjith had approached Arya to play the antagonist, with the actor's involvement still described as tentative at that time with high possibilities for a cast change. Arya's involvement eventually became official. His casting reunites him with Ranjith after Sarpatta Parambarai (2021). Contemporary reports continued to describe his character as a gangster during 2025. Arya had undergone substantial physical training for the role. Sobhita Dhulipala joined during the 2025 production phase. In May 2025, it was reported that she had been cast as the female lead. She returned to Tamil cinema after Ponniyin Selvan: I (2022) and Ponniyin Selvan: II (2023). In 2026, Dhulipala said that she would appear in a very different "avatar" and described the film as some of her best work. Her first-look was released on 31 May. Kalaiyarasan, who has collaborated with Ranjith in several films, and Shabeer Kallarakkal, who was a part of Sarpatta Parambarai, are a part of the principal cast.

The principal actors had undergone training for the film's traditional combat disciplines, including Mallakhamba and other martial-arts/self-defence techniques. The final cast reported by the filmmakers and major outlets includes Mime Gopi, Guru Somasundaram, John Vijay, Sai Dheena, Anandsami, Harish Uthaman, Lizzie Antony, Lingesh, Prem Kumar, Kavitha Bharathi, Arjun, Santha Kumar, Melody, Manisha, Nimmy Raphael, Vikram, Naveen, and Prakash.

=== Filming ===
In March 2025, reports indicated that filming had finally begun after earlier delays. A report published that principal photography had started on 31 March in Chennai. The first schedule was reported in the Kumbakonam and Karaikudi region, and was completed by late April. For the second schedule, a large set had been constructed in Chennai, with the entire cast expected to participate there. On 13 July, veteran stunt artist S. Mohanraj died during the filming of a car stunt in the Nagapattinam district. The stunt involved an SUV being launched from a ramp as part of a vehicle-topping sequence. The vehicle flipped during the stunt. The accident disrupted the production. By October, however, filming had resumed. Arya said on 26 October that he was actively filming and that the production was working on the climax. On 30 October, Arya reported that the climax shoot had resumed after another interruption caused by heavy rain. On 19 November, DT Next reported that the climax had been shooting continuously since 30 October, meaning approximately 20 days of filming had been devoted to the sequence. Arya indicated that the climax was nearing completion. Dinamani reported on 24 November that Vettuvam had completed its shoot; however, Ranjith said that additional filming / finishing work continued into May 2026.

=== Post-production ===
Selva RK is the editor. VFX director Rahul Kabali, designer Kiln, supervisor Ginu Ram and the studio Phantom Digital Effects were involved in the production.

== Music ==
The soundtrack is composed by G. V. Prakash Kumar, in his second collaboration with Ranjith after Thangalaan.

== Release ==
=== Theatrical ===
Vettuvam was scheduled for a theatrical release in December 2026 worldwide, but was later postponed to January 2027, during Pongal.
