= Attakathi (soundtrack) =

Soundtrack album by Santhosh Narayanan
- Released: 9 January 2012
- Recorded: 2011
- Studios: Studios 301, Sydney
- Genre: Feature film soundtrack
- Length: 20:47
- Language: Tamil
- Label: Think Music
- Producer: Santhosh Narayanan

Santhosh Narayanan chronology
Attakathi (2012)	Pizza (2012)

Attakathi is the soundtrack album to the 2012 film of the same name directed by Pa. Ranjith in his directorial debut and produced by C. V. Kumar, starring Dinesh and Nandita Swetha. The film's musical score and soundtrack are composed by Santhosh Narayanan, in his debut as a film composer. The seven-song soundtrack featured lyrics written by Kabilan, Muthamil, Gana Bala, Pradeep Kumar and Ayinjivaakkam Muthu. Much of the film's songs were based on the gaana genre which is also fused with world music elements.

The album was released on 9 January 2012 under the Think Music label. It received positive reviews from critics and audiences, with praise for its composition and soundscape that combined with the rural elements. Bala won the Ananda Vikatan Cinema Awards for Best Male Playback Singer, while the album received a Mirchi Music Award South—Upcoming Male Vocalist of the Year for Pradeep—out of six nominations, and two Vijay Award nominations amongst other accolades.

Attakathi proved as a breakthrough for Santhosh who emerged as a leading composer in the South Indian cinema. Bala and Pradeep, who debuted with this album, also went to become leading singers-songwriters. Attakathi was also noted for the resurgence of the gaana genre, one of the popular music genres in the 1990s, that became obsolete in the 2000s.

== Development ==
Before his involvement in Attakathi, Santhosh had worked as a recording engineer, arranger, programmer at A. R. Rahman's Panchathan Record Inn and AM Studios, Chennai. After being acclaimed for his work in the short film Advaitham (2011), Santhosh had composed the songs for Uyir Mozhi, which he intended for his debut music album. When producer C. V. Kumar saw him working in a studio, he offered him to compose the music for Attakathi, which he willingly agreed, as he wanted to work on something different from the rest. Santhosh was a particular about not using Indian elements of music and the makers provided him freedom to experiment on the score and soundscape.

Santhosh had composed several songs in the gaana, a folk genre which was predominant in the North Chennai. Having little knowledge of the different communities and folk forms in the country, as well as acoustic music, Santhosh admitted that the film provided him a learning experience. Santhosh further introduced Gana Bala and Pradeep Kumar as a playback singer in the Tamil film music scene. The song "Nadukadalula Kappala" is a rendition of Bala's own gaana song, which Santhosh had borrowed and arranged the tune, but credited Bala for the composition and lyrics. Another song "Aadi Pona Aavani" infuses world music into gaana. The songs and score were mixed and mastered at the Studios 301 in Sydney, Australia, and engineered by Grammy Award-winning musician Leon Zervos, who was known for collaborating with Lady Gaga and Ennio Morricone.

== Release ==
The soundtrack was marketed and distributed by Think Music and was released on 9 January 2012. The release coincided with a launch event held at Sathyam Cinemas, Chennai, and was attended by directors Venkat Prabhu, Sasi, Vetrimaran, composer Yuvan Shankar Raja, producers Abirami Ramanathan, S. Thanu, T. Siva and actors Shiva, Vaibhav Reddy and S. P. B. Charan among others.

== Track listing ==
No.	Title	Lyrics	Singer(s)	Length
1.	"Aasai Oru Pulveli"	Kabilan	Pradeep Kumar, Kalyani Nair	3:52
2.	"Aadi Pona Aavani"	Kabilan	Gana Bala	4:41
3.	"Adi En Gana Mayil"	Ayinjivaakkam Muthu	Ayinjivaakkam Muthu	2:28
4.	"Podi Vechi Pudippan"	Muthamil	Sathyan, Palakkad Sreeram, Brinda	4:08
5.	"Band Musical Sequence" (Instrumental)	—	Band Kuberan, Band Murali	1:03
6.	"Nadukadalula Kappala"	Gana Bala	Gana Bala	1:39
7.	"Vazhi Parthirundhen"	Pradeep Kumar	Pradeep Kumar	2:56
Total length:				20:47

== Critical reception ==
The soundtrack was positively reviewed by critics, with Karthik Srinivasan of Milliblog noted "Atta Kathi's debutant composer Santhosh Narayanan assembles an interesting assortment of sounds, no doubt. They don't add up to anything spectacular but definitely seem promising." The Times of India wrote "The buoyant score by Santhosh Narayanan, peppered with raw gaanas and a jaunty accordion theme, acts as an effective counterpoint to the rawness of the visuals and adds to the liveliness." Pavithra Srinivasan of Rediff.com said "Santhosh Narayan's music carries a fun-filled signature tune that has a lovely Spanish lilt to it."

Vivek Ramz of In.com wrote "Santhosh Narayan's background music is haunting and songs stand apart from the typical ones. “Aasai Oru Pulveli” & 'Aadi Pona Aavani' are the pick of the lot." Malathi Rangarajan of The Hindu wrote "Santhosh Narayanan's music comprises songs (‘Gaana’) typical to the suburbs, though he also offers a melody, ‘Aasai Oru Pulveli.’ But the background score is mostly pedestrian." Attakathi was listed by Ashuthosh Mohan of Film Companion South as one of the composer's best soundtracks, with "Aasai Oru Pulveli" as the pick of the album, and complimented the varied musical arrangements and instrumentation that complimented the story and characters.

== Accolades ==
Award (Note: Awards, festivals and organisations are in alphabetical order.)	Date of ceremony (Note: Date is linked to the article about the awards held that year, wherever possible.)	Category	Nominee(s)	Result	Ref.
Ananda Vikatan Cinema Awards	16 January 2013	Best Male Playback Singer	Gana Bala – ("Aadi Pona Aavani" and "Nadukadalula Kappala")	Won	
Big FM Tamil Melody Awards	19 August 2013	Best Debut Music Director	Santhosh Narayanan (Note: also for Pizza)	Won	
Big FM Tamil Melody Awards	19 August 2013	Best Male Playback Singer	Pradeep Kumar – ("Aasai Oru Pulveli")	Nominated	
Chennai Times Film Awards	4 November 2013	Best Music Director	Santhosh Narayanan	Nominated	
Chennai Times Film Awards	4 November 2013	Best Lyricist	Kabilan – ("Aasai Oru Pulveli")	Nominated	
Chennai Times Film Awards	4 November 2013	Best Singer (Male)	Gana Bala – ("Nadukadalula Kappala")	Nominated	
Edison Awards	10 February 2013	Best Music Director	Santhosh Narayanan	Nominated	
Edison Awards	10 February 2013	Best Lyricist	Kabilan – ("Aasai Oru Pulveli")	Nominated	
Edison Awards	10 February 2013	Best Male Playback Singer	Gana Bala – ("Aadi Pona Aavani")	Nominated	
Jaya TV Awards	28 December 2012	Best Music Director	Santhosh Narayanan	Won	
Mirchi Music Awards South	26 August 2013	Lyricist of the Year	Kabilan – ("Aasai Oru Pulveli")	Nominated	
Mirchi Music Awards South	26 August 2013	Upcoming Male Vocalist of the Year	Pradeep Kumar – ("Aasai Oru Pulveli")	Won	
Mirchi Music Awards South	26 August 2013	Upcoming Lyricist of the Year	Gana Bala – ("Nadukadalula Kappala")	Nominated	
Mirchi Music Awards South	26 August 2013	Mannin Kural Male Vocalist of the Year	Gana Bala – ("Nadukadalula Kappala")	Nominated	
Mirchi Music Awards South	26 August 2013	Mannin Kural Male Vocalist of the Year	Gana Bala – ("Aadi Pona Aavani")	Nominated	
Mirchi Music Awards South	26 August 2013	Technical – Sound Mixing of the Year	R. K. Sundar – ("Aadi Pona Aavani")	Nominated	
Vijay Awards	11 May 2013	Best Male Playback Singer	Gana Bala – ("Nadukadalula Kappala")	Nominated	
Vijay Awards	11 May 2013	Best Lyricist	Gana Bala – ("Nadukadalula Kappala")	Nominated	

== Legacy ==
With Attakathi, Santhosh emerged as one of the leading musicians in Tamil and South Indian cinema. He would also collaborate with Ranjith consecutively on his ventures from Madras (2014) to Sarpatta Parambarai (2021); the latter was his final collaboration with Ranjith, as the latter would work with other composers for his directorials.

"Gana is the music of people in the Chennai-Kancheepuram-Thiruvallur-Chengelpet belt. There is a misconception that this music is a rung below classical or folk music. It is actually an art form like the other genres. I would call gana singers as born artists as they don't learn from any guru. They absorb the music from their life and express it in a form common people can understand."

— Pa. Ranjith on gaana music

Attakathi was instrumental in the resurgence of gaana genre, which was once popular in the 1990s, courtesy of composer Deva. (Note: Deva was instrumental in bringing gaana to film music, becoming a part of pop culture. His waning popularity in the early 2000s, also led to the decline of gaana songs in Tamil films. During that period, the song "Vazha Meenu" sung by Gana Ulaganathan for Chithiram Pesuthadi (2006) was an instant success, but that did not help in the resurgence of gaana or Gana Ulaganathan's popularity.) Ranjith added that the success of the gaana songs—"Aadi Pona Aavani" and "Nadukadalula Kappala"—were attributed to not diluting the essence of the genre for commercial purposes. Few months after the film's release and its eventual success, the other films that released in 2013—Kanna Laddu Thinna Aasaiya, Udhayam NH4, Soodhu Kavvum and Idharkuthane Aasaipattai Balakumara—had included gaana songs.

Attakathi also provided breakthrough for Gana Bala, who debuted in the industry since 2007. Speaking to The Hindu's Udhav Naig, Bala added that after Attakathi's release, he recorded three songs every week and had sung around 50 songs in 2013, adding "My target this year is to sing 100 songs and write lyrics for 50 songs." Pradeep Kumar, who sang "Aasai Oru Pulveli" in his debut, also went on to become a leading musician in the Tamil and South Indian industry and further continued his collaboration with Santhosh in his other films.
