= Neelam (organisation) =

Indian human rights organisation

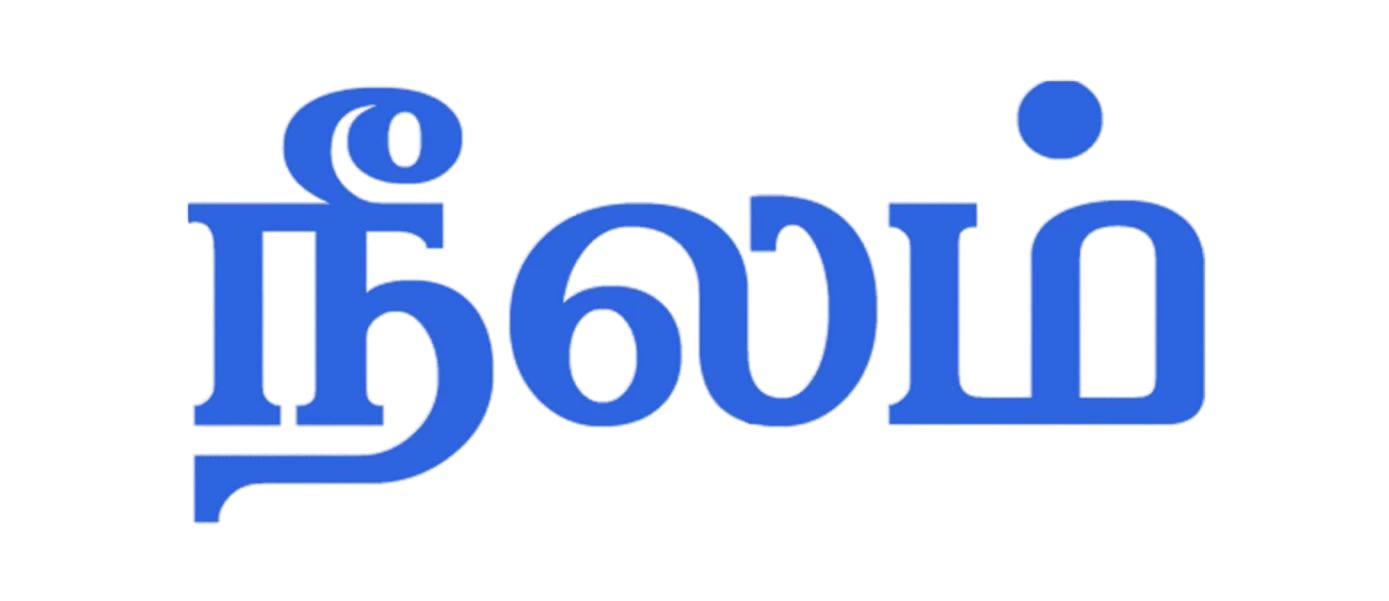
- Formation: 2015
- Founder: Pa. Ranjith
- Headquarters: Chennai, Tamil Nadu, India
- Publication: Neelam
- Subsidiaries: Neelam Foundation; Neelam Productions; Neelam Cultural Center; Neelam Social
- Website: https://theneelam.com/

Neelam (Tamil: நீலம்) is an Indian socio-cultural NGO founded by filmmaker Pa. Ranjith, based in Chennai, Tamil Nadu. The organisation works towards anti-caste social justice, Dalit-Bahujan cultural expression and community activism across cinema, journalism, literature, performance art and public debate. It functions through different branches such as Neelam Productions, Neelam Panpaatu Maiyam (Neelam Cultural Centre), Neelam Foundation, Neelam Social and a literary magazine titled Neelam. The organisation draws inspiration from the Ambedkarism philosophy of B. R. Ambedkar and aims to generate a Dalit-perspective platform for art, politics and culture.

== History ==
Around 2015, Pa. Ranjith and his associates formed the Neelam Foundation, focused on the educational upliftment of marginalized children in Chennai slums. The foundation runs "Neelam Educational Centers," which provide children with extra-curricular training in art, culture, and sports. This foundational work in community activism subsequently expanded into the broader, more public-facing socio-cultural organisation comprising Neelam Productions, Neelam Panpaatu Maiyam, and Neelam Social aimed at anti-caste politics in media and the arts.

== Organisation and structure ==
Neelam functions as an umbrella organisation with multiple divisions focused on different forms of outreach:

- Neelam Foundation: A dedicated NGO to social work and the upliftment of marginalized communities, with a particular focus on empowering children and women.
- Neelam Productions: A film and media production arm that backs cinema and documentaries with anti-caste and socially conscious themes.
- Neelam Panpaatu Maiyam (Neelam Cultural Centre): A cultural centre dedicated to performance, art festivals, public debates, and community engagement.
- Neelam Social: A media and journalism wing producing documentaries, interviews and digital content on oppressed communities, caste politics and social issues.
- Neelam (magazine): A Tamil-language literary and socio-political journal aiming to create space for new voices, art forms and critique from a Dalit-perspective.

== Neelam Foundation ==
The Neelam Foundation is dedicated to social work and the upliftment of marginalized communities, with a particular focus on empowering children and women. It is an NGO initiative under the broader organization founded by filmmaker Pa. Ranjith. The Foundation's primary work revolves around running Neelam Educational Centers across Tamil Nadu, which offer training programs and creative opportunities for children from marginalized groups, aiming to nurture their talents in areas like folk art, photography, mime, rap, filmmaking, and theatre. Beyond the centers, it organizes residential arts camps for these children to enhance their skills and build community. Furthermore, the Foundation extends its social justice mission by launching programs to provide workshops and professional opportunities for aspiring filmmakers who are women and queer from marginalized backgrounds, thereby addressing issues of representation and social equity within the media industry.

== Neelam Productions ==
Neelam Productions is the film-production banner under Neelam. It has supported feature films and documentaries directed or produced by Pa. Ranjith and his associates like it co-produced a comedy-drama project with associate director Dhinakaran Sivalingam. The production wing contributes to the organisation’s mission by leveraging mainstream cinema and media to address caste, identity and representation issues.

In August 2025, Neelam Productions publicly alerted the public about fake audition calls circulating in its name, reaffirming that only its official handles should be trusted.

Theatrical film productions by Neelam Productions:

Year	Film	Notes
2018	Pariyerum Perumal	
2019	Irandam Ulagaporin Kadaisi Gundu	
2021	Kuthiraivaal	
2021	Sarpatta Parambarai	
2021	Writer	
2022	Seththumaan	
2022	Natchathiram Nagargiradhu	
2023	Bommai Nayagi	
2024	Blue Star	
2024	J Baby	
2024	Thangalaan	
2025	Bottle Radha	
2025	Papa Buka	Papua New Guinea-India co-production
2025	Thandakaaranyam	
2025	Bison Kaalamaadan	

== Neelam Panpaatu Maiyam (Neelam Cultural Centre) ==
Neelam Panpaatu Maiyam actively organises art festivals, public gatherings, and cultural programmes aimed at reclaiming Dalit history, culture, and voice through artistic expression. Its flagship event, the Vaanam Art Festival, is held annually during Dalit History Month, celebrating marginalized identities and fostering community dialogue. The cultural centre also launched initiatives such as the Women & Trans Persons Cinema Forum and media campaigns like #VoteOutHate to promote social justice and inclusivity. Notably, it took legal action in 2021 when a song was falsely associated with its festival, underscoring its commitment to authenticity and respect for marginalized voices.

In collaboration with filmmaker Pa. Ranjith, Neelam Panpaatu Maiyam helped launch The Casteless Collective, an indie band blending Gaana, hip-hop, rock, rap, and folk music to raise socio-political awareness. The band, formed in 2017, emerged from auditions aimed at uniting musicians driven by both artistic skill and social motivation, It consists of popular artists such as Arivu, Tenma and Isaivani.

== Neelam Social ==
Neelam Social is a digital media platform associated with Neelam. It produces documentaries and digital content exploring issues of caste, gender, sexuality, colorism and labour and releases most of their documentaries on their YouTube channel. In March 2024, Neelam Social produced and released Kalli Paal-la Oru Tea (Coffee with Cactus Milk), an anthology film, directly on its YouTube channel. The project featured four short films by women directors focusing on the issues women face in a patriarchal society.

In August 2022, it co-hosted a global virtual concert “Radical Rhythms” with Dalit artists from around the world to highlight caste-based oppression in global workplaces.

== Neelam (magazine) and Bookstore ==
The Neelam magazine (sometimes referred to as Neelam Itazhl or simply “Neelam magazine”) presents Tamil-language essays, poems, short stories, writing on painting, music, performance, criticism and culture from a Dalit-perspective. The editorial vision emphasises not only discussing Dalit issues but using the Dalit lens to understand all social, cultural and political phenomena.

=== Neelam Bookstore and Cultural Space ===
Neelam Bookstore and Cultural Space, located in Egmore, Chennai, is an Ambedkarite anti-caste literary and cultural venue. It offers works by Ambedkar, Dalit writers like Bama, graphic novels such as Bhimayana, and Tamil translations of prominent authors, often absent from mainstream bookstores.

The space is designed to be flexible, hosting events like concerts, discussions, and exhibitions with movable furniture. It supports emerging Dalit and Bahujan writers through mentorship and affordable, quality publications.

Filmmaker Pa. Ranjith and academic V. Geetha recognize Neelam’s role in promoting anti-caste literature and inclusive cultural discourse. Architect Iraianbu Murugavel designed the space to challenge elitist norms and foster accessibility.
