= Soodhu Kavvum (soundtrack) =

Soundtrack album by Santhosh Narayanan
- Released: 27 March 2013
- Recorded: 2013
- Studios: Studios 301, Sydney
- Genre: Feature film soundtrack
- Length: 16:43
- Language: Tamil
- Label: Think Music
- Producer: Santhosh Narayanan

Santhosh Narayanan chronology
Pizza (2012)	Soodhu Kavvum (2013)	Pizza II: Villa (2013)

Soodhu Kavvum is the soundtrack album to the 2013 film of the same name directed by Nalan Kumarasamy and produced by C. V. Kumar's Thirukumaran Entertainment, starring Vijay Sethupathi, Sanchita Shetty, Karunakaran, Bobby Simha, Ramesh Thilak and Ashok Selvan. The musical score is composed by Santhosh Narayanan whose soundtrack featured six songs with lyrics written by GKB, (Note: credited as Ganesh Kumar B.) Muthamil, Gana Bala, Sean Roldan, (Note: credited as R. R. (abbreviation for R. Raghavendra)) Hiphop Tamizha Adhi (Note: credited as Adhi) and Nalan himself. The album was released under the Think Music label on 27 March 2013.

== Background ==
The musical score and soundtrack were composed by Santhosh Narayanan who had worked with Kumar's previous productions Attakathi and Pizza (both 2012). Like his previous films, Santhosh experimented on the film score infusing jazz, pop and kuthu elements, to match the tone and themes.

The song "Come Na Come" opens with a parody of informational programs on Doordarshan before transitioning into a jazz-infused song that uses minimal orchestration, and more instruments played in one hand. "Mama Douser" written by Nalan himself, has vocals by Andrea Jeremiah, and is in a bar brawl sequence early on the film; the lyrics featured colloquial Tamil sung in the style of jazz, providing an added humour. "Ellam Kadanthu Pogumada" is considered a tribute to the Tamil philosophical songs in the 1950s. The song "Kasu Panam" is a mixture of rap and gaana fused with electronic beats. Sean Roldan and Hiphop Tamizha Adhi were credited as lyricists on the song "Ellam Kadanthu Pogumada" and the theme song "Sudden Delight" for the Tamil lyrics, lip synced by Rob Mass and orchestral portions performed by Studio Orchestra of Sydney.

The album was mixed and mastered at the Studios 301 in Sydney, Australia, by Steve Smart who had worked with international musicians.

== Release ==
The soundtrack was distributed by Think Music and released on 27 March 2013. The release coincided with a launch event held at Sathyam Cinemas, Chennai which saw the attendance of the film's cast and crew along with other noted personalities from the Tamil film industry.

== Reception ==
Karthik Srinivasan of Milliblog wrote, "With Soodhu Kavvum, Santhosh proves that his unconventional style is here to stay". S. Saraswathi of Rediff.com described it as a "refreshing non-conventional background score", and Baradwaj Rangan of The Hindu described the songs and score as "outstanding". Malini Mannath of The New Indian Express stated "The songs are apt and suitably placed, and the background score enhances the feel." Vivek Ramz of In.com noted "Santhosh Narayan's funky songs and cool background score are big boost to the film. Lyrics are funny and songs are pictured nicely and inserted at the right places."

Ashutosh Mohan of Film Companion ranked Soodhu Kavvum as one of Santhosh's best works as quirky and appealing. Analysing the film's musical structure, Pulari M. Baskar stated "The film humours you while keeping you at the edge of your seat, twisting and confounding the audience. Narayanan's music score follows the same unpredictability, as he effortlessly brings together catchy pop-jazz beats and elements of kutthu (a form of folk dance and music with a heavy emphasis on percussion) to create an unlikely yet fitting theme for a group of flawed and lovable protagonists." The song "Kaasu Panam" was considered as one of the popular songs of 2013.

== Track listing ==
No.	Title	Lyrics	Singer(s)	Length
1.	"Come Na Come"	GKB	GKB, Chinna	3:55
2.	"Mama Douser"	Nalan Kumarasamy	Andrea Jeremiah	3:20
3.	"Ellam Kadanthu Pogumada"	Sean Roldan	Kovai Jaleel	2:41
4.	"Sudden Delight"	Hiphop Tamizha Adhi	Rob Mass	2:37
5.	"Sa Ga"	Muthamil	Divya Ramani	1:43
6.	"Kaasu Panam"	Gana Bala	Gana Bala, Anthony Daasan	2:27
Total length:				16:43

== Accolades ==
Award (Note: Awards, festivals and organisations are in alphabetical order.)	Date of ceremony (Note: Date is linked to the article about the awards held that year, wherever possible.)	Category	Nominee(s)	Result	Ref.
South Indian International Movie Awards	12–13 September 2014	Best Lyricist – Tamil	Gana Bala – ("Kaasu Panam")	Nominated	
South Indian International Movie Awards	12–13 September 2014	Best Music Director – Tamil	Santhosh Narayanan	Nominated	
Vijay Awards	5 July 2014	Best Music Director	Santhosh Narayanan	Nominated	
Vijay Awards	5 July 2014	Best Female Playback Singer	Andrea Jeremiah	Nominated	
Vijay Awards	5 July 2014	Best Background Score	Santhosh Narayanan	Won	
Vijay Awards	5 July 2014	Favourite Song	"Kaasu Panam"	Nominated	
