= Pizza (soundtrack) =

2012 soundtrack album by Santhosh Narayanan

Soundtrack album by Santhosh Narayanan
- Released: 6 September 2012
- Recorded: 2012
- Studios: Studios 301, Sydney
- Genre: Feature film soundtrack
- Length: 23:49
- Language: Tamil
- Label: Think Music
- Producer: Santhosh Narayanan

Santhosh Narayanan chronology
Attakathi (2012)	Pizza (2012)	Soodhu Kavvum (2013)

Pizza is the soundtrack album to the 2012 film of the same name directed by newcomer Karthik Subbaraj and produced by C. V. Kumar's Thirukumaran Entertainment starring Vijay Sethupathi and Remya Nambeesan. The film is scored by Santhosh Narayanan whose soundtrack featured lyrics written by Kabilan, Arunraja Kamaraj, Muthamil and Vineeth. The soundtrack was released under the Think Music label on 6 September 2012 to positive reviews from critics.

== Development ==
The score for Pizza was recorded, mixed and mastered at the Studios 301 in Sydney, Australia and engineered by Grammy Award-winner Leon Zervos. The Sydney Symphony Orchestra performed the orchestral portions for the score. Santhosh collaborated with Gana Bala again after Attakathi, performing the blues song "Dhinakkudha". He explained, "I wanted to attempt something new with his voice, but he took the song to a whole new dimension." Arunraja Kamaraj debuted as a lyricist with the song "Rathiri", which includes dialogue by Rajinikanth from the 1992 film Annaamalai.

== Release ==
The soundtrack was distributed under the Think Music label and released on 6 September 2012 at Sathyam Cinemas in Chennai.

== Track listing ==
No.	Title	Lyrics	Singer(s)	Length
1.	"Mogathirai"	Kabilan	Pradeep Kumar	3:49
2.	"Rathiri" (Decent Version)	Arunraja Kamaraj	Haricharan	3:34
3.	"Engo Odugindrai"	Arunraja Kamaraj	Alphons Joseph, Darshana KT	3:05
4.	"Pizza Theme"	—	Brinda	2:09
5.	"Rathiri" (Arath Version)	Arunraja Kamaraj	Haricharan	4:21
6.	"Mogathirai" (Prelude)	—	Phil Hartl and Quartet	1:26
7.	"Dhinakkudha"	Muthamil	Gana Bala	3:05
8.	"Rathiri" (Rap Version)	Arunraja Kamaraj, Vineeth	Haricharan, Arunraja Kamaraj, Santhosh Narayanan, Vineeth	2:20
Total length:				23:49

== Reception ==
Karthik Srinivasan of Milliblog wrote, "Santhosh Narayanan delivers on the promise he showed in Atta Kathi". The Hindu wrote "Santhosh Narayanan has experimented with the music in Pizza by foraying into a genre, different from the folk sound of his earlier Attakathi" and called the prelude version of "Mogathirai" as the "standout". Vivek Ramz of In.com wrote "Santhosh Narayanan's 'Mogathirai' song is an instantly hummable one and picturised beautifully too. His background music is the biggest strength of the film and he's showed lot of finesse, especially during the thrilling moments in the film."

Malini Mannath of The New Indian Express added the score being "eerie creepy" enhancing the mood and feel, while adding "Gana Bala’s blues jazz track is used with good effect as a cell phone’s ring tone here." N Venkateswaran of The Times of India stated "More seasoning is provided by music composer Santosh Narayanan, who earlier scored a winner with Attakathi [...] The good background score [by Santhosh] ensure that the pizza remains crispy." Sify wrote "The background score and music of Santosh Narayan (Attakathi fame) is a major plus." Santhosh won the Big FM Tamil Melody Award for Best Debut Music Director for his work in the film (also for Attakathi).

== Background score ==
Pizza

Film score by Santhosh Narayanan
- Released: 9 February 2025
- Recorded: 2012
- Studio: Studios 301, Sydney
- Genre: Film score
- Length: 29:28
- Label: Think Music
- Producer: Santhosh Narayanan

The film's original score was released an album by Think Music on 9 February 2025, 13 years after the film's release. It featured twenty tracks, also including a reprised version of "Mogathirai" performed by Sathyaprakash.

No.	Title	Length
1.	"Theme"	2:07
2.	"Mogathirai" (Reprise) (ft. Sathyaprakash)	2:52
3.	"New Little Life"	3:08
4.	"Intimacy"	1:25
5.	"The Moment"	0:37
6.	"Fist Fight"	1:17
7.	"Evil Realisations"	1:52
8.	"Childish"	0:27
9.	"The Call"	0:58
10.	"Locked Up"	1:32
11.	"Expose"	1:11
12.	"Terrified" (ft. Phil Hartl and Quartet)	0:54
13.	"You Are Not Alone"	1:06
14.	"Served Cold"	0:25
15.	"Lost"	0:56
16.	"Discredit"	4:15
17.	"Automotives"	0:41
18.	"Thought Process"	0:59
19.	"Vicious Circles"	1:12
20.	"Traumatized"	1:29
Total length:		29:28
