= Karuppu Pulsar =

2026 Tamil film

- Theatrical release poster
- Directed by: Murali Krish
- Produced by: Dr. Sathya Murali Krishnan
- Starring: V R Dinesh; Reshma Venkatesh; Madhunika
- Cinematography: Baskar Arumugam
- Edited by: Sasi Daksha
- Music by: Inbaraj Rajendran
- Production company: Yasho Entertainment
- Release date: 30 January 2026
- Running time: 114 minutes
- Country: India
- Language: Tamil

Karuppu Pulsar (transl. Black Pulsar) is a 2026 Indian Tamil-language film directed by Murali Krish in his debut, who had previously worked as an assistant to M. Rajesh. The film stars V R Dinesh, Reshma Venkatesh and Madhunika in the lead roles, alongside Saravana Subbiah, Mansoor Ali Khan and others in important roles. The film is produced by Dr. Sathya Murali Krishnan under Yasho Entertainment banner, with the music composed by Inbaraj Rajendran, cinematography handled by Baskar Arumugam and editing done by Sasi Daksha.

Karuppu Pulsar released in theatres on 30 January 2026.

== Cast ==
- V R Dinesh as Dasaratha Raja
- Reshma Venkatesh
- Madhunika
- Saravana Subbiah as Velraj
- Mansoor Ali Khan as Kaveri
- Prinz Arjai as Selvam
- Prankster Rahul as Hariharan
- Lollu Sabha Manohar

== Release and reception ==
Karuppu Pulsar released in theatres on 30 January 2026.

A critic of Dinamalar rated the film with 2 out of 5 stars. A critic of Maalai Malar gave 1.5 out of 5 stars and criticised the film for its typical story and suggested the need for a better screenplay. Akshay Kumar of Cinema Express gave 1 out of 5 stars and wrote "What makes Karuppu Pulsar unforgivable is its token messaging, which is a gross underestimation of the audience's intellectual capability. The film, with no redeemable qualities, can just be proud of its crisp runtime, and nothing else".

The film was also reviewed by Dina Thanthi.
