= Vembu (film) =

2025 Indian film by Justin Prabhu V

- Theatrical release poster
- Directed by: Justin Prabhu V
- Written by: Justin Prabhu V
- Produced by: Golden Shures; Vijayalakshmi
- Starring: Hari Krishnan; Sheela Rajkumar
- Cinematography: A. Kumaran
- Edited by: K. J. Venkatramanan
- Music by: Manikandan Murali
- Production company: Manjal Cinemas
- Release date: 23 May 2025
- Country: India
- Language: Tamil

Vembu is a 2025 Indian Tamil-language social drama film directed by Justin Prabhu V. Produced by Golden Shures and Vijayalakshmi under Manjal Cinemas, the film stars Hari Krishnan and Sheela Rajkumar. It was theatrically released on 23 May 2025.

== Cast ==
- Hari Krishnan as Vetri
- Sheela Rajkumar as Vembu
- Karnan Janaki

== Production ==
Vembu is directed by Justin Prabhu V. It was produced by Golden Shures and Vijayalakshmi under the banner of Manjal Cinemas. The film's cinematography is handled by A. Kumaran, editing by K. J. Venkatramanan, and the music is composed by Manikandan Murali.

== Release ==
Vembu is released in theatres on 23 May 2025.

== Reception ==
A critic of Dinamalar gave 2.75/5 stars by praising the social message and intent while criticizing the amateur storytelling. Ashwin S of Cinema Express gave 1.5/5 stars and wrote "Vembu wants to empower women; it wishes for a better world for them, but in the end, it shows the struggle of a woman’s family life rather than her career. It wants to be technically strong, but is flawed to a fault. It tries to be a film with a message for the audience but is let down by its story. "
