= Arjai =

Indian actor (born 1981)

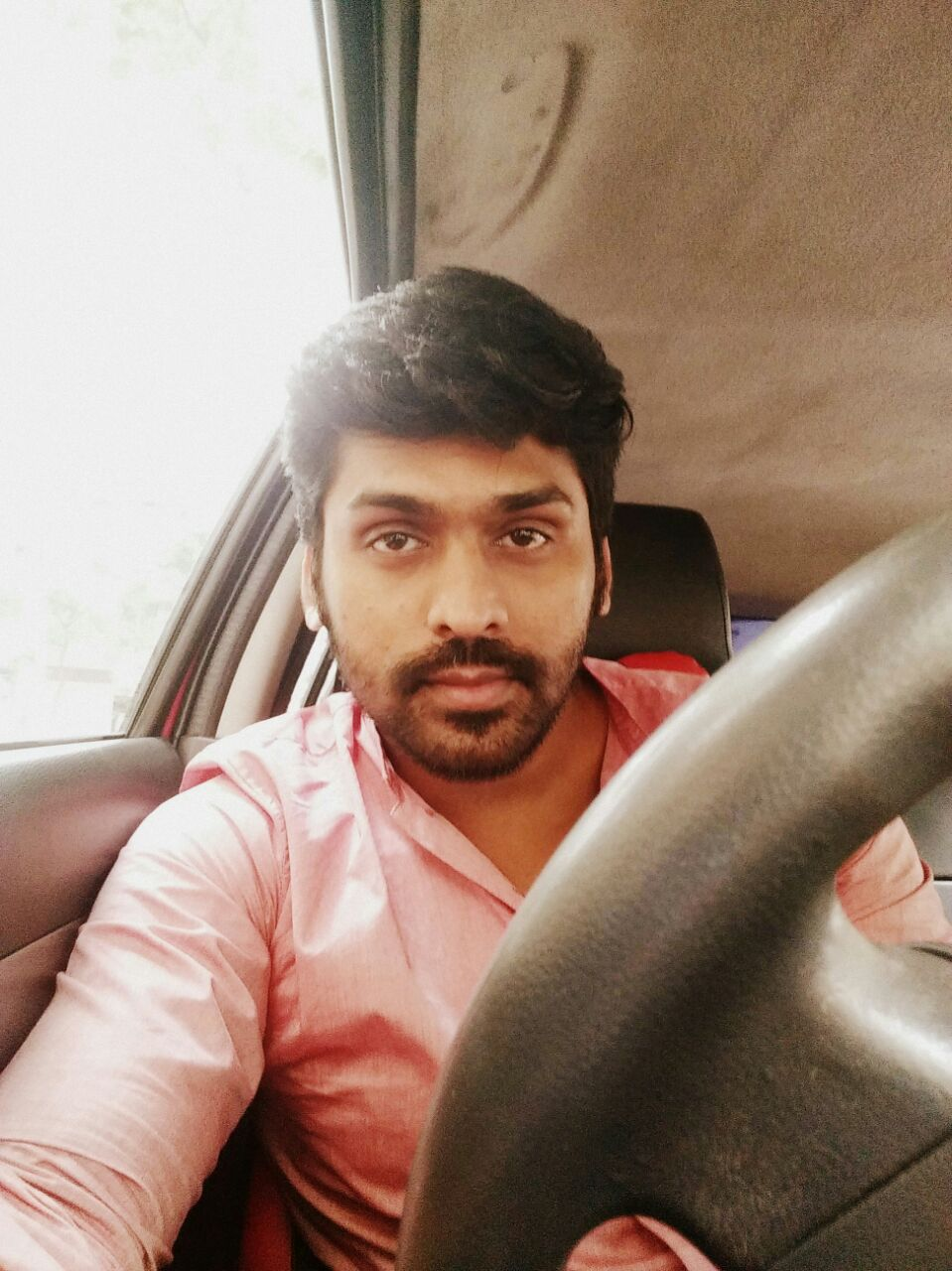
- Born: 3 July 1987 (age 39); Pazhani, Dindigul, Tamil Nadu
- Other name: Prinz Nitik
- Occupation: Actor

Arjai, previously credited as Prinz Nithik is an Indian actor, who has appeared in Tamil language films. He has appeared as the antagonist in films including Naan Sigappu Manithan (2014) and Massu Engira Masilamani (2015).

== Career ==
While pursuing his profession as a graphic designer, Prinz Nithik trained under stunt choreographer Pandiyan, and sought to make a career as an actor. Prinz became acquainted with actor Vishal after meeting him at a film function, and the actor had revealed that Prinz would have been an ideal for a villainous role in Pandiya Naadu, but the team had already chosen another actor. Vishal agreed to work with Prinz at a later date, while director Shakti Rajan chose to introduce him as the antagonist in another film Naaigal Jaakirathai (2014), for which he worked closely with a Belgian Shepherd. Vishal later signed him on to appear in Naan Sigappu Manithan (2014), in which he played a similar negative role. Both films won positive reviews and performed well at the box office. In 2015, he portrayed a supporting antagonist in Venkat Prabhu's Massu Engira Masilamani (2015).

== Filmography ==
Year	Title	Role(s)	Notes
2014	Naan Sigappu Manithan	Guna	
2014	Naaigal Jaakirathai	Arunachalam	
2015	Massu Engira Masilamani	Mahesh	
2015	Paayum Puli	Vettu Rajendran's henchman	
2016	Bangalore Naatkal	Shiva's friend	
2016	Theri	Chetan's henchman	
2017	Yaman	Shakthi	
2017	Pandigai	Victor	
2017	Thiri	Kishore	
2018	Semma Botha Aagathey	Ravi	
2018	Sandakozhi 2	Pechi's brother-in-law	
2019	Ayogya	Kaalirajan's brother	
2019	Devi 2	Victor	Simultaneously shot in Telugu as Abhinetri 2
2019	Thittam Poattu Thirudura Kootam	George Britto	
2020	Velvet Nagaram	Michael	
2021	Sulthan	Thalaya	
2021	Annaatthe	Kaalaiyan's friend	
2022	Anbarivu	Singaram	
2022	Theal		
2022	Veerapandiyapuram	Varathan	Simultaneously shot in Telugu as Sivudu
2022	Miral	Police inspector	
2023	Kathar Basha Endra Muthuramalingam		
2023	Shoot The Kuruvi	Kuruvi Rajan	
2023	80s Buildup	Velan	
2025	Eleven	Dheeran and Dheeraj	Dual role; Simultaneously shot in Telugu
2025	Kumaara Sambavam		
2026	Karuppu Pulsar	Selvam	credited as Prinz Arjai
2026	Magudam	Kiruba's childhood friend	
2026	Mookuthi Amman 2	Devi's husband	

=== Television ===
Year	Title	Role	Network	Ref.
2023	Sengalam	Jayaram	ZEE5	
