= Irandam Ulagaporin Kadaisi Gundu =

2019 Indian Tamil-language film

- Theatrical release poster
- Directed by: Athiyan Athirai
- Written by: Athiyan Athirai
- Produced by: Pa. Ranjith
- Starring: Dinesh; Anandhi
- Cinematography: A. Kishor Kumar
- Edited by: Selva R. K.
- Music by: Tenma
- Production company: Neelam Productions
- Release date: 6 December 2019
- Running time: 137 minutes
- Country: India
- Language: Tamil

Irandam Ulagaporin Kadaisi Gundu (transl. The last bomb of World War II), also known simply as Gundu (transl. Bomb), is a 2019 Indian Tamil-language drama film directed by Athiyan Athirai. The film stars Dinesh and Anandhi. Produced by Pa. Ranjith under his banner Neelam Productions, the film focuses on the fictional story, inspired from the true events from World War II. The film has cinematography handled by Kishore Kumar, while the music is composed by Tenma. Released on 6 December 2019, the film received critical acclaim from critics and audiences.

== Plot ==
Selvam is a lorry driver for an iron scrap yard. It is run by Basha Bhai who decreases his salary because there is always iron missing when he is done his job. Selvam's dream is to marry his girlfriend Chittu and buy his own lorry like his dad dreamed of but he cannot since her family despises his job and thinks he's a thief. Meanwhile, World War II bombs are washed up on shore near Orissa which an AlJazzera reporter Tanya wants to uncover the bomb since it made her an orphan. The Minister and another company boss working with them want to stop her. The police are ordered to kill Tanya and her friend Sugi. Selvam decides to pick up his last load. In his load, the bomb is found but he thinks it is brass and leaves it in the load. Selvam and his co-worker Puncture go to the Chennai iron melting place. Meanwhile, Chittu is planned to be killed by her relatives since she uncooperative with them. She escapes and meets with Selvam. When the reach the place, the boss of the place rejects the bomb and tells Selvam it is a bomb. Selvam panics and Chittu is kidnapped by her relatives. Selvam and Puncture decide to hide the bomb but reconsider their idea when they hide it near a school. Tanya and Sugi, running away from the police, meets Selvam. Puncture accidentally tells Tanya and Sugi that they have the bomb they are looking for. Selvam decides to help Tanya after she explains her story. They find the bomb from a fake priest. Chittu escapes from her relatives and goes to meet Selvam. Selvam has a fight with the police and Chittu's relative, which he kills. The police officer takes the lorry which the bomb is in. The police officer runs over Puncture's leg and tries to escape. Selvam fights with the police and goes to kill him but doesn't. Selvam is wrongly accused of taking the bomb and arrested. A few months later, Selvam succeeds his dream and the Minister is arrested.

== Cast ==
- Dinesh as Selvam
- Anandhi as Chitra
- Munishkanth (Ramdoss) as Subbaiya Swamy (Puncture)
- Riythvika as Tanya
- John Vijay as Arms dealer
- G. Marimuthu as Basha Bhai
- Charles Vinoth as Chitra's brother-in-law
- Ramesh Thilak as Velu
- Rama as Selvam's mother
- Munnar Ramesh as Veeramuthu, Selvam's father
- Lijeesh as Sub-Inspector Shankar
- Hari Krishnan as Hari, the grenade stealer
- S. R. Dhivya Pradeepa as Chitra's sister
- Subathra as Selvam's friend
- Saranya Ravi as Sugi, Tanya's friend
- Supergood Subramani as Bhai
- Karuppu Nambiyar as Watchman
- Jeya Perumal
- Poster Nandakumar
- Suryakanth

== Production ==
Dinesh, who worked with Pa. Ranjith in Attakathi and Anandhi who worked with Ranjith in Pariyerum Perumal, were cast as the male and female leads, respectively. Dinesh liked the story and was willing to produce the film, but Pa. Ranjith of Neelam Productions later offered to produce the film after months passed by without any success.

== Soundtrack ==
Irandam Ulagaporin Kadaisi Gundu

Soundtrack album by Tenma
- Released: 22 November 2019
- Recorded: 2019
- Studios: Seed Studios; Krimson Avenue Studios
- Genre: Feature film soundtrack
- Length: 29:16
- Label: Think Music
- Producer: The Casteless Collective

Tenma chronology
Irandam Ulagaporin Kadaisi Gundu (2019)	Pothanur Thabal Nilayam (2022)

Singles from Irandam Ulagaporin Kadaisi Gundu
- 1. "Nilamellam" Released: 23 September 2019; 2. "Maavuliyo Maavuli" Released: 4 November 2019

The soundtrack album is composed by Tenma, a member of the 19-piece band called The Casteless Collective that includes four rappers, seven instrumentalists and eight gaana musicians, a popular folk music style in Tamil Nadu, which was initiated by Pa. Ranjith under his socio-cultural activity Neelam Panpattu Maiyam. Tenma got this opportunity to compose the music for the film, due to the overwhelming response for the band's debut album "Magizhchi" which was released in December 2018, at the Vaanam Arts Festival, which was initiated by Ranjith himself.

The audio rights were purchased by Think Music. The first single track from the film titled "Nilamellam" was released on 23 September 2019. It is a fast-paced folk number with a mix of Therukoothu and Magudattam. The lyrics were written by Umadevi and the song was rendered by K. Chitrasenan, Arivu, Gana Muthu and Ezhumalai, who were a part of The Casteless Collective band. The second single track titled "Maavuliyo Maavuli" written by Thanikodi and sung by Tenma and Shweta Mohan was released on 4 November 2019. The track is a melody number.

The tracklist was revealed on 21 November 2019, with Umadevi, Thanikodi, Muthuvel and Arivu penning the lyrics of the songs. The full soundtrack album was released on 22 November 2019. Sruthi Raman from The Times of India, noted in her review, in which about the song "Maavuliyo Maavuli" she stated that "The song hits all the right notes, accompanied by Tenma’s voice and EDM beats." She referred "Nilamellam" as "a fast-paced number accompanied by Therukoothu and Magudattam." For "Nedu Vazhi" she stated "Vignesh Ishwar’s voice depicts a beautiful portrait of a son’s relationship with his father. The acoustic beats hold the song’s core intact.

For the song "Thalaimurai" she referred that "the one song that depicts all that the film stands for, is rendered by two women, with completely different vocal textures. Shakthisree Gopalan and Chinnaponnu conjure a world of peace, yearning to let go off violence and war. Fierce keys complement the fast-paced number". She further added "Irul Vaanam" as "a romantic soliloquy that is pleasantly rendered by Subiksha Rangarajan" She added "Chinna Machan (from Charlie Chaplin 2) fame folk singer Senthil Ganesh injects his characteristic energy into Iruchi, which makes brilliant use of harmonium and Nadaswaram." She finally concluded that "It is clear from Tenma’s rich soundscape that it is designed to organically flow with the film’s narrative rather than stick out as individual pieces."

Track listing
No.	Title	Lyrics	Singer(s)	Length
1.	"Maavuliyo Maavuli"	Thanikodi	Tenma, Shweta Mohan	3:59
2.	"Nilamellam"	Umadevi	K. Chitrasenan, Arivu, Gana Muthu, Ezhumalai	5:09
3.	"Nedu Vazhi"	Muthuvel	Vignesh Iswar	4:56
4.	"Irul Vaanam"	Umadevi	Subiksha Rangarajan	4:40
5.	"Thalaimurai"	Arivu	Shakthisree Gopalan, Chinnaponnu	5:24
6.	"Iruchi"	Umadevi	Senthil Ganesh	5:09
Total length:				29:16

== Release ==
Irandam Ulagaporin Kadaisi Gundu was released on 6 December 2019.
