= Vaanam Art Festival =

Dalit art festival

Vaanam Dalit Art Festival
- Location: Chennai, Tamil Nadu
- Founded: 2018
- Founded by: Pa. Ranjith, Neelam Cultural Center
- Festival date: April
- Website: https://twitter.com/Vaanam_Art/

The Vaanam Art Festival is an annual cultural event organized by filmmaker Pa Ranjith's Neelam Cultural Centre. The festival aims to celebrate Dalit culture, promote social awareness, and provide a platform for artistic expression. It takes place in April, coinciding with Dalit History Month and the birth month of Dr. B.R. Ambedkar.

== Editions ==
=== 2018 ===
The inaugural edition of the 'Vaanam' festival took place at St. Ebbas Girls School on RK Salai in Mylapore, Chennai, over a span of three days, commencing with an opening ceremony at the hands of renowned filmmaker Pa Ranjith. The festival, featuring a diverse range of cultural expressions, including song, dance, drama, and art, aimed to foster discussions and debates on critical societal issues. Pa Ranjith, who was behind the festival, highlighted the significance of the event in addressing prevailing social challenges and initiating conversations on universal equality. The festival showcased various performances, including the 'Parai&Oppari' presentation, the 'Magizhchi' album launch & performance' by The Casteless Collective, and a 'Parai performance' by numerous skilled artists. Beyond entertainment, 'Vaanam' incorporated literature workshops, story-telling sessions, Silambam demonstrations, Therukural street-drama, puppet shows, and thought-provoking plays like 'Munnavar.' Notable social campaigner Jignesh Mewani, in a spirited speech, emphasized the role of art forms, particularly cinema in the style of Pa Ranjith, as crucial mediums for advancing the war against caste. The festival's title, 'Vaanam,' symbolizes the equality of all under the sky, reinforcing the call for universal equality and pride.

=== 2022 ===
The festival commenced with the PK Rosy Film Festival at Prithvi Theatre in Saligramam, showcasing the best of Dalit cinema from across the country. It served as a curtain-raiser for the larger Vaanam Festival for Dalit History Month. The festival featured a diverse range of events, including a photography exhibition documenting the lives of marginalized communities, an art exhibition challenging mainstream perspectives, and a theatre festival showcasing productions from versatile theatre groups. Additionally, the festival honored the late Dalit Subbaiah, known for his advocacy of Ambedkarite and Marxist ideologies. The literary festival included the presentation of an award to writer Raj Gauthaman and interactive sessions for contemporary writers. The cricket competition and Verchol, a two-day Dalit literary meet in Madurai, added further dimensions to the festival. The artworks exhibited at Dakshina Chitra Heritage Museum questioned identity and existentialism, offering a platform for nearly 22 Dalit artists to express their perspectives on caste issues.

=== 2023 ===
The 2023 edition of the Vaanam Art Festival, curated by director Pa Ranjith's Neelam Cultural Centre, took place in April, coinciding with the birth month of Dr. B.R. Ambedkar and Dalit History Month. The month-long festival featured a diverse range of activities, including a book exhibition, the PK Rosy Film Festival, the Niththam Art and Photography Exhibition, the Dhamma Theatre Festival, and the Verchol Dalit Literary Festival. Notably, the festival aimed to provide a platform for subaltern youth to engage actively in political thought and discourse. The events took place at accessible locations in Chennai, challenging conventional associations with the upper caste glare. The Niththam exhibition showcased the everyday lives of subaltern individuals through the lens of photography, with contributions from around 40 artists, including first-time photographers from Nepal, Maharashtra, and Kerala. The literary festival featured panels moderated by young, first-time writers, fostering vibrant discussions on writing and philosophy.

== Controversy ==
Poet and assistant director Viduthalai Sigappi, associated with filmmaker Pa Ranjith, faced legal action for reciting a satirical poem titled 'Malakkuzhi Maranam' (deaths in manholes) during the Vaanam Arts Festival. The poem, addressed the issue of manual scavenging deaths. The Bharath Hindu Munnani, a right-wing outfit, filed a complaint, leading to the Tamil Nadu police registering an FIR against Sigappi. Neelam Cultural Centre defended Sigappi, emphasizing that the poem aimed to draw attention to societal ignorance about manual scavenging deaths and was not intended to insult religious beliefs. The controversy sparked condemnation from various quarters, with support for Sigappi coming from individuals like actor Kalaiyarasan, Sriperumbudur MLA K Selvaperunthagai, filmmaker Lenin Bharathi, writer-activist Shalin Maria Lawrence, and director Shan.
