= Seththumaan =

2022 Tamil language drama film

- Promotional release poster
- Directed by: Thamizh
- Written by: Perumal Murugan
- Produced by: Pa. Ranjith
- Starring: Manikkam; Ashwin; Prasanna Balachandran; Savithri
- Cinematography: Pratheep Kaliraja
- Edited by: C. S. Prem Kumar
- Music by: Bindu Malini
- Production company: Neelam Productions
- Distributed by: SonyLIV
- Release date: 27 May 2022
- Country: India
- Language: Tamil

Seththumaan is a 2022 Indian Tamil-language drama film written and directed by Thamizh. The film features Manikkam, Ashwin, Prasanna Balachandran and Savithri, and was released on 27 May 2022.

== Cast ==
- Manikkam as Poochi
- Ashwin Shiva as Kumaresan
- Prasanna Balachandran as Vellaiyyan
- Uriyadi Suruli as Subramani
- Savithri
- Arul Kumar as Rangan
- Kannika

== Production ==
The film marked the directorial debut of Thamizh, who had earlier worked as an assistant director in films such as Pattalam (2009) and Biryani (2013). Thamizh worked on a number of scripts but failed to successfully pitch them into film projects. He later watched the Malayalam film, Ozhivudivasathe Kali (2015), which helped him believe that he could make a project on a minimal budget. He has then inspired to make Seththumaan, based on Tamil writer Perumal Murugan's short story Varugari. The film concerns the relationship of a grandfather and his grandson, while taking an incisive look at the politics of caste and meat.

Thamizh hoped to make the film on a budget of 6 lakh rupees, but soon found himself unable to even meet the rental cost of the camera equipment. He later approached Pa. Ranjith for financial help, who opted to help produce the film.

Prior to its release, the film was premiered and received accolades at film festivals including the International Film Festival of Kerala and Chennai International Film Festival.

== Reception ==
The film was released on 27 May 2022 on SonyLIV. The New Indian Express gave the film a positive review, noting "smartly written dialogues are one of the highlights of Seththumaan, which poses a flurry of questions but doesn't necessarily burden itself with providing answers". Firstpost wrote "Tamizh makes an impressive directorial debut on a film around food and politics", while the Deccan Herald noted that it was a "a hard-hitting take on food politics"..Kavitha Muralidharan of The Hindu noted that " a set of powerful images. Some seemingly celebratory and some poignant." The Quint critic stated that "Seththumaan also makes us realise that even when there is a conflict between two people from the dominant-caste, the marginalised are the ones who bear the brunt." Dinamalar critic gave 2.75 rating out of 5.
