= Hari Krishnan (Tamil actor) =

Indian actor

- Born: Hari Krishnan Anbudurai
- Other name: Johnny Hari
- Occupation: Actor
- Years active: 2012–present

Hari Krishnan Anbudurai is an Indian actor who works in Tamil-language films. He is known for his role in Madras (2014).

== Career ==
Prior to acting, Hari Krishnan worked on several mime scripts in which he worked as a writer and actor. After playing supporting and minor roles in Pa. Ranjith's Attakathi (2012) and Maryan (2013), Hari Krishnan got his breakthrough with Ranjith's Madras (2014), in which he portrayed a vagabond of unsound mind named Johnny. After the success of the film, he went on to portray supporting roles in several of Ranjith's ventures and Vada Chennai (2018). He played a notable role in Sandakozhi 2 as a clan member who escapes from being killed from Pechi (played by Varalaxmi Sarathkumar) and is under the protection of Ayya (played by Rajkiran). He is set to play the lead role in a film titled Siragu, which is directed by Kutti Revathi and also stars debutante Akshitha and an untitled film produced by Ranjith.

== Filmography ==
- All films are in Tamil, unless otherwise noted.

Key
†	Denotes films that have not yet been released

Year	Film	Role	Notes
2012	Attakathi	Dinakaran's friend	
2013	Maryan	Fisherman	
2014	Madras	Johnny	Won—Edison Award for Best Supporting Actor
2016	Kabali	Tiger	
2016	Darling 2	Balaji	
2017	Yaakkai	Noor	
2017	Ivan Thanthiran	Gopi	
2018	Annanukku Jai	Anaconda Moorthy	
2018	Pariyerum Perumal	Pariyan's senior	
2018	Vada Chennai	Raju	
2018	Sandakozhi 2	Anbu	
2019	Irandam Ulagaporin Kadaisi Gundu	Hari	
2020	Paava Kadhaigal	Hari	Netflix film
2021	Devadas Brothers	Jegathesh	
2021	Vinodhaya Sitham	Veena's husband	
2021	Writer	Devakumar	
2022	Natchathiram Nagargiradhu	Yashvandhiran	
2023	Bommai Nayagi	Jeeva	
2023	Kaadapura Kalaikuzhu	Tamil	
2023	800	Vinoth	
2024	Thangalaan	Varadhan	
2025	Gentlewoman	Aravind	
2025	Vembu	Vetri	
2026	Baththa	Thirunavukarasu	

=== Streaming television ===
Year	Title	Role	Network
2022	Victim	Sekar's relative	SonyLIV
