= Bommai Nayagi =

2023 Indian drama film

- Theatrical release poster
- Directed by: Shan
- Written by: Shan
- Produced by: Pa. Ranjith
- Starring: Yogi Babu; Harikrishnan Anbudurai; G. M. Kumar; Subatra Robert; Srimathi
- Cinematography: Athisayaraj R
- Edited by: Selva R. K.
- Music by: Sundaramurthy K S
- Production companies: Neelam Productions; Yaazhi Films
- Release date: 3 February 2023
- Country: India
- Language: Tamil

Bommai Nayagi (transl. Doll heroine) is a 2023 Indian Tamil-language social drama film written and directed by Shan in his directorial debut and produced by Pa. Ranjith under Neelam Production. The film had Yogi Babu in the lead role. The music was composed by Sundaramurthy K S, Cinematography handled by Athisayaraj R and edited by Selva R. K. This film received critical acclaim from critics and audiences.

== Plot ==
Velu (Yogi Babu) is a simple man whose entire world revolves around his family and the tea stall he works in. One day, when his entire family were having fun at the Bommai Nayagi Amman temple festival, his daughter (Bommai Nayagi) went home to bring her piggy bank and offered the money she saved to the Deity. But a couple of drunkards abuse her on the way back, leaving her unconscious. The rest of the film deals with Velu's fight to bring justice to Bommai Nayagi.

== Cast ==
- Yogi Babu as Velu
- Harikrishnan Anbudurai as Jeeva
- Subatra Robert as Kayalvizhi, Bommai Nayagi's mother
- Srimathi as Bommai Nayagi
- G. M. Kumar as Velu's father
- Aruldoss as Senthil
- Lizzie Antony
- S. S. Stanley
- Jayachandran
- Rockstar Ramani Ammal
- Sumaiya
- Ishmath banu
- Dhamu
- Indrajith
- Jayavel

== Production ==
The shooting of the film began in January 2021, and wrapped on 24 November 2021. Yogi Babu started dubbing for his portions on 1 February 2022.

== Soundtrack ==
Bommai Nayagi

Soundtrack album by Sundaramurthy K. S.
- Released: 6 January 2023
- Genre: Feature film soundtrack
- Length: 21:11
- Label: Think Music
- Producer: Neelam Productions

Sundaramurthy K. S. chronology
Beginning (2023)	Bommai Nayagi (2023)	Thandatti (2023)

Singles from Bommai Nayagi
- 1. "Adiye Raasaathi" Released: 6 January 2023; 2. "Kadar Kara Kaathu" Released: 20 January 2023

The soundtrack album is composed by Sundaramurthy K S, the audio rights were purchased by Think Music. The first single titled "Adiye Raasaathi" was released on 6 January 2023 and it is a melody number. The song written by Kabilan, composed by Sundaramurthy K S and sung by Sathyaprakash.

Track listing
No.	Title	Lyrics	Singer(s)	Length
1.	"Adiye Raasaathi"	Kabilan	D. Sathyaprakash	04:51
2.	"Kadar Kara Kaathu"	Sithan Jayamoorthy & Shan	Rockstar Ramani Ammal	03:27
3.	"Bommai Nayagi"	Ilaya Kamban	Sithan Jayamoorthy	04:34
4.	"Vaanam Thaiyaga"	Kabilan	Haricharan	05:24
5.	"Saga Uyire"	Arivu	Srimathi, Srisakthi & Shan	02:55
Total length:				21:11

== Release ==
=== Theatrical ===
The film was released theatrically on 3 February 2023.

=== Home media ===
The post theatrical streaming rights of the film is sold to ZEE5, while the satellite rights of the film is sold to Zee Tamil.

== Reception ==
Logesh Balachandran of The Times of India wrote, "Bommai Nayagi is yet again an effective social drama that addresses a sensitive issue in the most sensible way. It has a drama that affects us deeply. Worth a watch".
