= Kadapuraa Kalaikuzhu =

2023 Tamil film

Kaadapura Kalaikuzhu
- Theatrical release poster
- Directed by: Raja Gurusamy
- Written by: Raja Gurusamy
- Produced by: Dr.Muruganandam Veeraragavan; Dr.Shanmugapriya Muruganandam
- Starring: Munishkanth; Kaali Venkat; Mime Gopi
- Cinematography: Vinoth Gandhi
- Edited by: Ram Gopi
- Music by: Henry
- Production company: Sakti Ciinee Production
- Release date: 7 July 2023
- Country: India
- Language: Tamil

Kaadapura Kalaikuzhu is a 2023 Tamil language film written and directed by Raja Gurusamy. The film starring Munishkanth, Kaali Venkat, Mime Gopi and Hari Krishnan in lead roles. The film is produced by Dr.Muruganandam Veeraragavan and Dr.Shanmugapriya Muruganandam under the banner Sakti Ciinee Productions. The film was released on 7 July 2023 in theatres.

== Cast ==
- Munishkanth as Pavadasamy
- Kaali Venkat as Thangarasu
- Mime Gopi as Easwaramoorthy
- Hari Krishnan as Tamizh
- Srilekha Rajendran
- Swathi Muthu as Kalaiarasi
- Supergood Subramani as Pencil Meesai Perumal
- Anthakudi Ilayaraja

== Production ==
The film's cinematography was done by Vinoth Gandhi. The editing of the film was handled by Ram Gopi. The trailer of the film was released on 19 July 2023.

== Music ==
The music for the film was composed by Henry.

Track listing
No.	Title	Lyrics	Singer(s)	Length
1.	"Ammaadi Ammaadi"	Raja Gurusamy	Pradeep Kumar	4:35
2.	"Naatu Kuthu"	Raja Gurusamy	Mathichiyam Bala; Anthakudi ilayaraja Folk star Lakshmi	4:25
3.	"Rattakka Rattakka"	Raja Gurusamy	Anthony Daasan	3:45
Total length:				12:45

== Reception ==
A critic from Maalai Malar stated that "the Kaadapura Kalaikuzhu can be enjoyed.". A critic from Dina Thanthi stated that "Director Raja Guruswamy has tried to tell a biographical story about the destruction of folk arts due to the arrival of western music and the livelihood of people who depend on it has become a concern.". Hindu Tamil Thisai critic rated two point five out of five stars and wrote that "this group of artists is appealing because it speaks to the status of rural arts".Dinamalar critic gave two points five stars out of five and gave mixed reviews.
