= Parari, Buxar =

Parari
- village
- Location in Bihar, India Parari (India)
- Coordinates: 25.616°N 84.060°E
- Country: India
- State: Bihar

Languages
  - Official: Bhojpuri, Hindi
- Time zone: UTC+5:30 (IST)
- ISO 3166 code: IN-BR

Parari, also called Heetan Parari or Hetan Parari, is an ancient village located in Buxar, Bihar, India. It was named after Heetan Trivedi. Its only around 10 kilometres far from Uttar Pradesh .

The River Ganga at the Uttar Pradesh Border is also around 10 Kilometres from Parari.

== Education ==
- Baal Vikas Kendra (Centre for Child Development) -a school
