= Pothanur Thabal Nilayam =

- Poster
- Directed by: Praveen
- Produced by: Sudhan Sundaram; G. Jayaram
- Starring: Praveen; Anjali Rao; Venkat Sundar
- Cinematography: Sukumaran Sundar
- Edited by: Praveen
- Music by: Tenma
- Production company: Passion Studios
- Distributed by: aha
- Release date: 27 May 2022
- Running time: 120 minutes
- Country: India
- Language: Tamil

Pothanur Thabal Nilayam (transl. Pothanur Post Office) is a 2022 Indian Tamil-language heist film written and directed by Praveen. The film features Praveen himself in the lead role, Anjali Rao and Venkat Sundar, and was released on 27 May 2022.

== Cast ==
- Praveen as Praveen
- Anjali Rao as Mirthula
- Venkat Sundar as Sangu
- Jagan Krish
- Seetharaman
- Deena Angamuthu
- Sambath Kumar

== Production ==
Praveen Venkataraman began writing Pothanur Thabal Nilayam in the early 2010s. The film, set in the 1990s, focuses on the Podanur Post Office, the oldest and the first post office in Coimbatore, that has been functioning since 1886.

Praveen gained experience in filmmaking animation, by notably working as a technical director with Walt Disney Pictures and was a pipeline director on Soundarya Rajinikanth's Kochadaiiyaan (2014). Production on Pothanur Thabal Nilayam began by August 2015, with Praveen putting together a technical team of young short filmmakers from Coimbatore to assist him. The film was launched under his own studio – Bicycle Cinemas – and took five years to complete. Scenes were shot at Coimbatore Town Hall, which was redesigned to look like a post office. The film was shot across Tamil Nadu and Kerala.

In November 2021, Passion Studios acquired the film and announced intentions of making the film into a trilogy.

== Reception ==
The film was released on 27 May 2022 on the streaming platform, aha. A reviewer from Cinema Express gave the film a negative review noting "director Praveen treats the film like an uninventive drama from the 80s, by topping it with cartoonish performances, overlong shots, and a jarring background score". The film received a middling review from The Hindu.

In contrast, News Today also gave the film a positive review noted that "Praveen does a commendable job. He impresses not just as actor and filmmaker but also as art director. Anjali Rao does a super show." Dinamalar critic gave a mixed review and gave 2.5 rating out of 5.
