= Bottle Radha =

2025 film by Dhinakaran Sivalingam

- Theatrical release poster
- Directed by: Dhinakaran Sivalingam
- Written by: Dhinakaran Sivalingam
- Produced by: Pa. Ranjith; T. N. Arunbalaji
- Starring: Guru Somasundaram; Sanchana Natarajan; John Vijay
- Cinematography: Roopesh Shaji
- Edited by: E. Sangathamizhan
- Music by: Sean Roldan
- Production companies: Neelam Productions; Balloon Pictures
- Distributed by: Generous Entertainments
- Release dates: 4 November 2023 (Dharamshala International Film Festival); 24 January 2025 (India)
- Running time: 146 minutes
- Country: India
- Language: Tamil

Bottle Radha is a 2025 Indian Tamil-language comedy drama film written and directed by Dhinakaran Sivalingam, and produced by Pa. Ranjith under Neelam Productions in association with T. N. Arunbalaji of Balloon Pictures. The film stars Guru Somasundaram and Sanchana Natarajan as the lead actors alongside John Vijay, Lollu Sabha Maaran, Merku Thodarchi Malai Antony, Pari Elavazhagan, Anbarasi and others in supporting roles. The technical team consists of cinematographer Roopesh Shaji, editor E. Sangathamizhan, and music composer Sean Roldan.

Bottle Radha was screened on 4 November 2023 in the Dharamshala International Film Festival. The film is scheduled to release in theatres on 24 January 2025.

== Synopsis ==
Radha Mani is a mason by profession, but a raging alcoholic for almost throughout the day. His wife Anjalam, and two children are the ones who bear the brunt of his addiction, and their lower-class life only adds to their woes. But when Radha finds himself in a rehabilitation and de-addiction centre one day, his frustrations only build up to be relieved from place.

== Cast ==
- Guru Somasundaram as Radha Mani
- Sanchana Natarajan as Anjalam
- John Vijay as Ashokan
- Lollu Sabha Maaran
- Merku Thodarchi Malai Antony
- Pari Elavazhagan
- Arumugavel
- Abhi Ramaiyah
- J.P. Kumar
- K.S. Karuna Prasad
- Malathi Ashok Nawin
- Suhasini Sanjeev
- Siranjivi
- Oviyar Sow. Senthil
- Naveen George Thomas
- Aneesha
- Madhavi Raj
- Kaala Kumar
- Anbarasi
- Shegar Narayana

== Production ==
On 24 June 2024, Neelam Productions unveiled their next venture titled Bottle Radha by debutant director Dhinakaran Sivalingam having Guru Somasundaram and Sanchana Natarajan in the lead roles. The film is produced by T. N. Arunbalaji under his Balloon Pictures banner in association with Neelam Productions. The Tamil-Malayalam language bilingual film also includes an ensemble cast composed of John Vijay, Lollu Sabha Maaran, Merku Thodarchi Malai Antony, Pari Elavazhagan, Arumugavel, Abhi Ramaiyah, J.P. Kumar, K.S. Karuna Prasad, Malathi Ashok Nawin, Suhasini Sanjeev, Siranjivi, Oviyar Sow. Senthil, Naveen George Thomas, Aneesha, Madhavi Raj, Kaala Kumar, Anbarasi and Shegar Narayana in supporting roles. The technical team consists of cinematographer Roopesh Shaji, editor E. Sangathamizhan, and music composer Sean Roldan.

== Music ==
Bottle Radha

Soundtrack album by Sean Roldan
- Released: January 23, 2025
- Length: 18:02
- Language: Tamil
- Label: Think Music India
- Producer: Sean Roldan

Sean Roldan chronology
Parari (2024)	Bottle Radha (2025)	Tourist Family (2025)

Singles from Bottle Radha
- 1. "Yov Bottle-U" Released: 22 July 2024; 2. "En Vanam" Released: 21 November 2024; 3. "Naa Naa Kudikaran" Released: 3 December 2024

External audio
- Bottle Radha - Jukebox on YouTube

The soundtrack and background is composed by Sean Roldan. The audio rights were acquired by Think Music. The first single "Yov Bottle-U" was released on 22 July 2024. The second single "En Vanam" released on 21 November 2024. The third single "Naa Naa Kudikaran" released on 3 December 2024.

Track listing
No.	Title	Lyrics	Singer(s)	Length
1.	"Naa Naa Kudikaran"	Arivu	Arivu	3:24
2.	"Yov Bottle - U"	Bakkiyam Shankar	Gana Balamurugan, Gana Chella Muthu, Gana Apelow	3:33
3.	"En Vanam"	Uma Devi	Sean Roldan	4:11
4.	"Thanniyila Kirukku"	Ramesh Vaidya	Gana Apelow	3:01
5.	"Punnagai Kalam"	Thanikodi	Vaikom Vijayalakshmi	3:53
Total length:				18:02

== Release ==
=== Premiere ===
The film had its world premiere at 12th Dharamshala International Film Festival on 4 November 2023.

=== Theatrical ===
Bottle Radha is scheduled to release in theatres on 24 January 2025. Earlier it was scheduled for 20 December 2024. The film received a U/A Certificate from the Central Board of Film Certification.

=== Home media ===
Bottle Radha is set to begin streaming on Aha from 21 February 2025.

== Reception ==
=== Critical response ===
Avinash Ramachandran of The Indian Express gave 3/5 stars and wrote "Despite the predictability, what really holds this movie together is the strong performances by Guru Somasundaram, Sanchana Natarajan, and John Vijay." Anusha Sundar of OTTPlay gave 3/5 stars and wrote "Bottle Radha is a decent drama that is equipped with highlighting performances. The film takes a win when it does not slide to become preachy, but also carries a noble message said in a subtle yet dramatic way."

Abhinav Subramanian of The Times of India gave 2.5/5 stars and wrote "Bottle Radha exists in an awkward space between social tract and cinema — its documentary-like fidelity to addiction’s realities and institutional reform sits uneasily alongside its dramatic ambitions." Prashanth Vallavan of Cinema Express wrote "Bottle Radha is a sincere effort to dissect the mechanism and destructive force of addiction, built through several impressive elements brought together by the director. However, we don’t connect with Radha Mani as much as we pity or empathise with him."
