= Parari (2024 film) =

Tamil film by Ezhil Periyavedi

- Theatrical release poster
- Directed by: Ezhil Periyavedi
- Written by: Ezhil Periyavedi
- Produced by: Harisankar
- Starring: Harisankar; Sangeetha Kalyan; Guru Rajendran
- Cinematography: Sridhar
- Edited by: Sam Rdx
- Music by: Sean Roldan
- Production company: Kala Films Private Limited
- Release date: 22 November 2024
- Country: India
- Language: Tamil

Parari (transl. Migrant) is a 2024 Indian Tamil-language film written and directed by debutant Ezhil Periyavedi. The film is produced under the Kala Films Private Limited banner by Harishankar, who is also the lead actor. Other cast members include Sangeetha Kalyan as the female lead, alongside Guru Rajendran, Samrat Suresh, Pugazh Mahendran, V. Bremnath and others in supporting roles. The technical crew consists of music composer Sean Roldan, cinematographer Sridhar and editor Sam RDX.

Parari got released in theatres on 22 November 2024.

== Cast ==
- Harisankar as Maran
- Sangeetha Kalyan as Devaki
- Guru Rajendran as Vedi
- Samrat Suresh as Samrat
- Pugazh Mahendran as Jagan
- Brem Nath as Jaya Kumar

== Production ==
=== Development ===
On 23 November 2023, an announcement was made by Lokesh Kanagaraj regarding the upcoming film titled Parari helmed by debutant Ezhil Periyavedi as the director, who had earlier worked as an assistant to director Raju Murugan The film stars Thozhar Venkatesan (2019) fame Harishankar in the lead role, who is also the producer of Parari under his banner Kala Films Private Limited. Other members of the cast include newcomers like Sangeetha Kalyan as the female lead, alongside Guru Rajendran, Samrat Suresh, Pugazh Mahendran, V. Bremnath and others, who were cast after a six-month acting training at brick-kilns and juice factory. The technical crew consists of music composer Sean Roldan, cinematographer Sridhar and editor Sam RDX.

=== Filming ===
Principal photography took place in Bengaluru, Krishnagiri and in villages around Tiruvannamalai and got wrapped after a single schedule of 45 days.

== Music ==
Parari

Soundtrack album by Sean Roldan
- Genre: Feature film soundtrack
- Language: Tamil
- Label: Saregama Tamil
- Producer: Sean Roldan

Sean Roldan chronology
Lubber Pandhu (2024)	Parari (2024)	Bottle Radha (2024)

Singles from Parari
- 1. "Saambava" Released: 12 September 2024; 2. "Un Saami En Saami" Released: 7 October 2024; 3. "Themaangani" Released: 22 October 2024

The soundtrack and background is composed by Sean Roldan. The first single "Saambava" was released on 12 September 2024. The second single "Un Saami En Saami" was released on 7 October 2024. The third single "Themaangani" was released on 22 October 2024.

All tracks are written by Uma Devi.

No.	Title	Singer(s)	Length
1.	"Saambava"	Meenakshi Elayaraja
2.	"Un Saami En Saami"	Sean Roldan
3.	"Themaangani"	P Samanaraja
4.	"Ada Mazha"	Roja Aditya
5.	"Kondrai Malar"	Lalitha Sudha

== Release ==
=== Theatrical ===
Parari got released in theatres on 22 November 2024. The film received a U/A certificate from the Central Board of Film Certification.

=== Home media ===
Parari is set to be premiered in Aha Tamil on 28 February 2025.

== Reception ==
=== Critical response ===
Akshay Kumar of Cinema Express gave 2.5/5 stars and wrote "Parari, for a decent amount of its runtime, is stuck to its core ideology of discarding all the man-made divisions. Barring some unhelpful subplots, information overdose, and occasional departure from his political standpoint, director Ezhil Periyavedi has made an impressive debut." Abhinav Subramanian of Times of India gave 2/5 stars and wrote "Parari raises important questions, but in trying to address everything, it ends up saying very little." Anusha Sundar of OTT Play gave 2/5 stars and wrote "Parari deals with two much-needed to be talked about issues. But by taking the responsibility to voice out for both, the film dilutes the understanding and its direction."

== Accolades ==
The makers announced that Parari bagged a bronze medal at the 57th World Fest-Houston International Film Festival under the Best Foreign Film category.
