= Parari, Paraíba =

Coordinates: 7°19′15″S 36°39′21″W

- Municipality
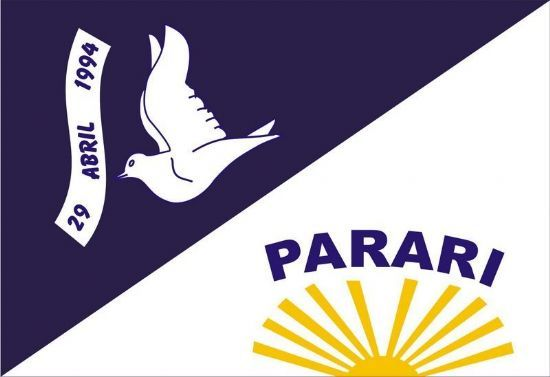
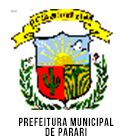
- Flag Coat of arms
- Interactive map of Parari, Paraíba
- Country: Brazil
- Region: South
- State: Paraíba
- Mesoregion: Boborema

Population (2020)
  - Total: 1,758
- Time zone: UTC−3 (BRT)

Parari (Central northeastern portuguese pronunciation: [pɐɾɐˈɾi]) is a municipality in the state of Paraíba in the Northeast Region of Brazil. Its area is 207.814 km2 and the population is 1,758 (2020 est.), being the least populous city in the state.

== See also ==
- List of municipalities in Paraíba
