= Future in fiction =

Future in fiction may refer to:

- Far future in fiction
- Near future in fiction
- Science fiction
- Time travel
