= V R Dinesh =

Indian actor

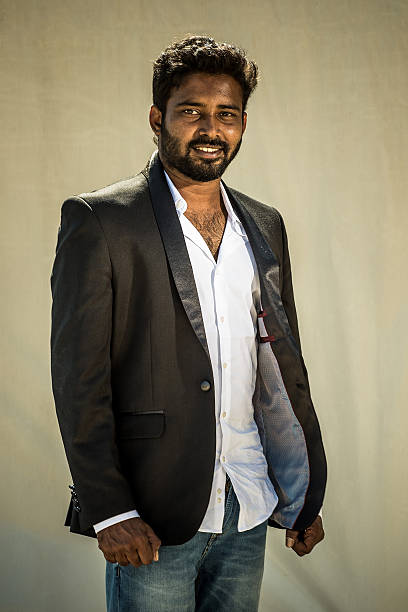
- Ravi in 2022
- Born: Dinesh Ravi; 27 September 1984 (age 42); Vellore, Tamil Nadu, India
- Other names: Attakathi Dinesh, Gethu Dinesh
- Occupation: Actor
- Years active: 2006–present

Ve. Ra. Dinesh (born 27 September 1984), better known by his former stage name Attakathi Dinesh, is an Indian actor who has acts in Tamil cinema. He made his breakthrough playing the lead role in Attakathi (2012).

== Career ==
Dinesh completed high school in Dhanalakshmi higher secondary school Royapuram, Chennai. After finishing high school, he tried his luck in acting from 2010. He acted in the Vijay TV's Kadhalika Neramilai serial after Sakthi's death. After playing the son to actress Seetha in the Sun TV series Penn and minor roles in Aadukalam (2011) and Mouna Guru (2011), Dinesh made a breakthrough appearing in Attakathi (2012). The film performed well commercially and also won positive reviews, with a critic from Rediff.com noting "he's an actor of great promise". Similarly a critic from Sify.com noted Dinesh "diverts your attention from the film's little flaws and spellbinds you with an endearing act that is Attakathi's biggest strength", adding that "Dinesh has come out with easily one of this year's most confident and assured performances."

After cameo appearances in Ethir Neechal (2013) and Pannaiyarum Padminiyum (2014), he was seen in a lead role again in Cuckoo (2014) produced by Fox Star Studios. His performance as a visually challenged man was praised by critics. Sify wrote "the film belongs to Dinesh, who has come out with a riveting performance" and called it "the best ever blind act since Kamal Haasan's Raja Paarvai. IANS, too, compared Dinesh to actor Kamal Haasan, stating "Dinesh is probably the next Kamal Haasan of the industry". Rediff wrote, "Dinesh has given a performance of the lifetime, his character is such a unique blend of vulnerability and defiance that every scene is worthy of praise" and The Times of India felt that he was "superbly natural as Tamizh". He was next seen in Thirudan Police (2014) directed by debutant Caarthick Raju.

His first 2015 release was Tamizhuku En Ondrai Azhuthavum. Dinesh starred in the movie Visaranai based the novel Lock Up by M. Chadrakumar. The film premiered in the Orizzonti (Horizons) section of the 72nd Venice Film Festival, where it won the Amnesty International Italia Award. Also it received highly positive reviews from both critics and audience alike. Dinesh played a supporting character in the film Kabali alongside Rajinikanth. His other films include Ulkuthu (2017), Annanukku Jai (2018), Kalavani Mappillai (2018) and Irandam Ulagaporin Kadaisi Gundu (2019). After the success of Lubber Pandhu (2024), where he played a character named "Gethu", he underwent two name changes: first to Gethu Dinesh, then to V R Dinesh.

== Filmography ==
Key
†	Denotes films that have not yet been released

=== Films ===
- Note: despite being known as Attakathi Dinesh, he is credited as Dinesh in almost all of his films.

Year	Film	Role	Notes
2006	E	Parthiban	
2007	Evano Oruvan		
2011	Aadukalam	Dinesh	
2011	Mouna Guru	Principal's son	
2012	Attakathi	Dinakaran (Attakathi)	Nominated, Vijay Award for Best Debut Actor; Nominated, SIIMA Award for Best Male Debutant
2013	Ethir Neechal	Dinakaran	Cameo appearance
2014	Pannaiyarum Padminiyum	The narrator	Cameo appearance
2014	Cuckoo	Tamizh	Nominated, Vijay Award for Best Actor
2014	Thirudan Police	Viswa	
2015	Tamizhuku En Ondrai Azhuthavum	Mukil	
2016	Visaranai	Paandi	
2016	Oru Naal Koothu	Rajkumar	
2016	Kabali	Jeeva	
2017	Ulkuthu	Raja	
2018	Merlin	Himself	Cameo appearance
2018	Annanukku Jai	Matta Sekar	
2018	Kalavani Mappillai	Deva	
2019	Irandam Ulagaporin Kadaisi Gundu	Selvam	
2021	Naanum Single Thaan	Udhay	
2023	Pallu Padama Paathuka	Mahesh	
2024	J Baby	Shankar	
2024	Lubber Pandhu	Poomalai "Gethu"	
2025	Thandakaaranyam	Sadaiyan	
2026	Karuppu Pulsar	Dasaratha Raja	
2026	Vettuvam	Nandhan	

=== Television ===
Year	Serial	Role	Channel
2006	Penn	Karthik	Sun TV
2007–2008	Kadhalikka Neramillai	Santhanam	STAR Vijay
