= Tenma (musician) =

Indian musician and film composer

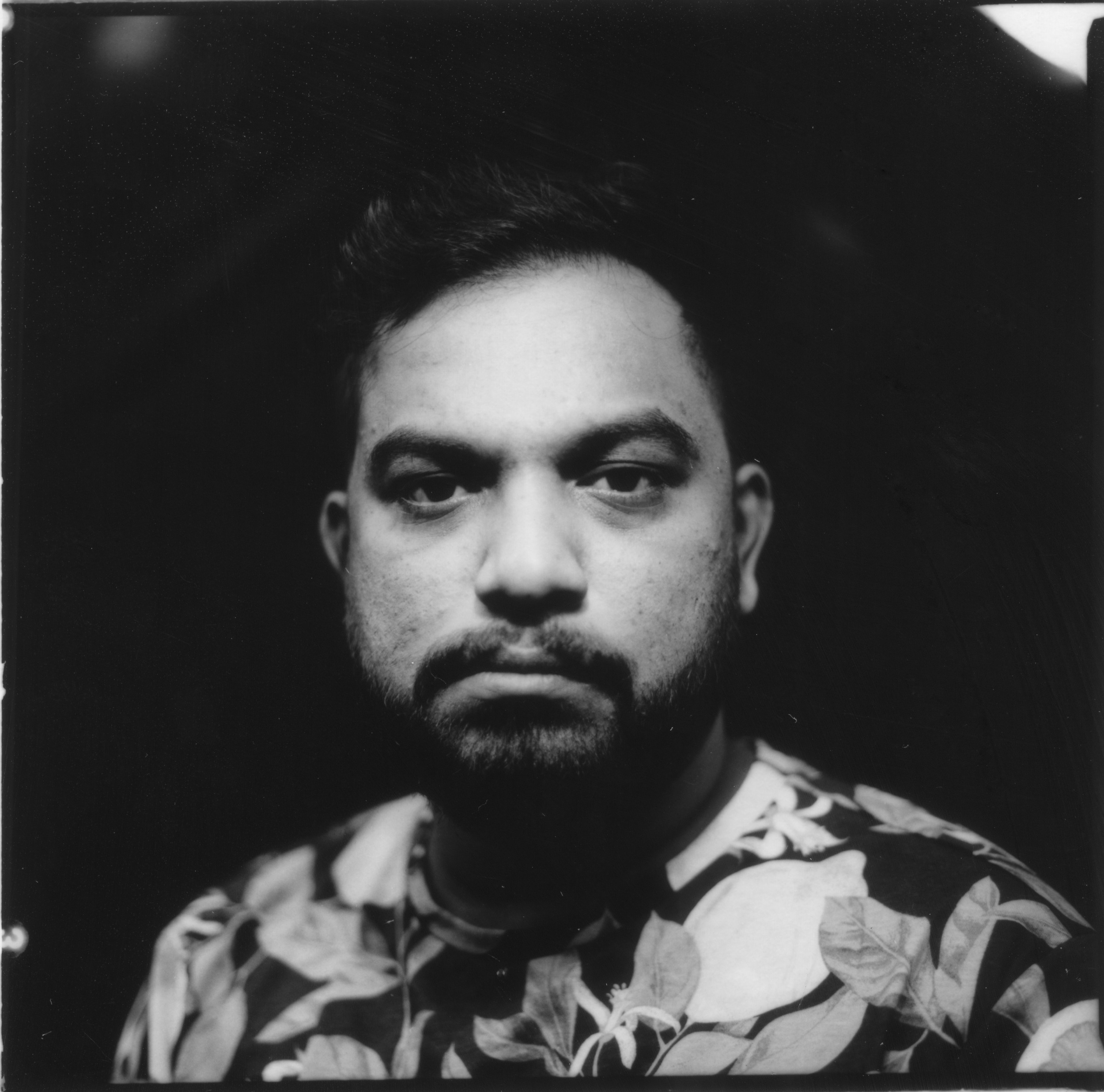
- Tenma
- Born: Tiburtius Vinodh Rubin; 18 May 1988 (age 38)
- Education: Loyola College, Chennai; Point Blank Music School
- Occupations: Composer; Songwriter; Singer
- Years active: 2008–present
- Website: Personal Twitter

Tiburtius Vinodh Rubin, better known professionally as Tenma, is an Indian music producer, singer, composer, bass guitarist, and festival director. He is most well recognized as the co-founder (with Pa. Ranjith) and leader of the indie band The Casteless Collective and the now-defunct band Kurangan. In 2019, he debuted as a music director for the Tamil film Irandam Ulagaporin Kadaisi Gundu. He is the co-founder of Madras Medai, a music festival and conference focusing on the growth of independent music in South India. He is also the founder of the Madras Indie Collective.

== Early years ==
Tenma grew up in a rough neighborhood in North Madras. He turned to music at an early age and learned to play classical guitar by performing in a number of events from weddings to funerals. He studied at the Don Bosco school in Chennai and later graduated with bachelor's degree in Visual Communication from Loyola College, Chennai. He started his music career at the age of 17 as a part of the indie bands Public Issue and Blind Image both of whom left a mark in the indie music scene in India in the 2000s. He later went to study Music Production and Sound Engineering in London at Point Blank Music College.

=== Personal life ===
Tenma cites the manga Monster as the inspiration for his stage name. He says, "I didn’t want caste, religion, and the identity given to me at birth. I didn’t want my family name because that’s a different person. He lived without knowing anything. Tenma at least knows something. I read this Manga book called Monster. The protagonist’s name is Kenzo Tenma, a very hopeful character. I love him. So, I named myself after him."

== Career ==
=== Kurangan ===
Tenma cofounded the band Kurangan with Kaber Vasuki, a singer and songwriter. Tenma met Kaber when he was fundraising for his album Azhagu Puratchi. Tenma had the vision to take the music forward, so he called Kaber and produced the album. The band became popular after performances such as appearances on Kappa TV and Terrace Jams. They produced multiple songs that became very popular in the years they were active, between 2015 and 2017. For various reasons, the two artists decided to split ways in 2017.

=== The Casteless Collective ===
Neelam Cultural Centre, a social change organization spearheaded by Pa. Ranjith, approached Tenma to do a workshop/ residency for Gaana artists and other musical artists to make songs that speak on equality and social justice. This involved bringing together artists who grew up as laborers and are working as daily wage workers in the slums and musicians from the independent music community who came from more privileged parts of society. The first Madras Records Residency resulted in The Casteless Collective – currently, India's largest Political Ensemble Band consisting of Folk, Gaana, Hip hop and Rock artists from North Madras (Chennai) and from Dharavi (Mumbai). The band writes songs on various social topics and issues that bring about dialogue on the status quo through music.

The first show held on 6 January 2018, had over 7000 people in attendance. Tenma brought in artists from Madras Indie Collective to work on the debut show. After the show, he was assigned to do the Casteless Collective Album. Instead of renting a studio, Tenma instead rented the Museum Theatre and gave prominence to the percussion instruments in the album. Considering that the instrument and the players themselves are still treated as "impure", this was an important step in breaking stereotypes. The Casteless Collective videos have reached more than a million views on social media. Under the music leadership of Tenma, it has produced multiple singles and as well as the popular albumMagizhchi.

=== Indie Music Initiatives ===
==== Madras Indie Collective (MIC) ====
The Madras Indie Collective was founded by Tenma as a movement to bring together and work with artists of various disciples from different socioeconomic backgrounds. The artists and the audience were curated to initiate dialogue on art and its relevance in a modern suburban context. MIC continued for the next 8 months which led to multiple collaborations between artists who would have never met otherwise, friendships were formed and bonds built. To bring some protocol in the workflow they started Madras Records. Small platforms were used to remove the divide between artists, audiences, and curators.

==== Madras Medai ====
Along with OfRo, Tenma co-founded Madras Medai, an Independent Music festival. The first performance took place on 19 May 2018. More than fifty artists performing different genres of original music were presented on the same stage to an audience of five thousand. This edition of the festival included artists from various music communities and backgrounds. After Madras Medai, most of the artists released albums with videos and started building their own smaller ecosystems within the larger ecosystem that Tenma had created with a group of artists.

== Film ==
Tenma's debut in composing for film came in 2019 for Athiyan Athirai's debut film Irandam Ulagaporin Kadaisi Gundu produced by Pa Ranjith's banner Neelam Productions. The album consisting of six songs received highly favorable reviews, such as "It’s like the voice for ‘the voiceless’. The lyrics convey so much meaning like the dialogues and It is clear from Tenma's rich soundscape that it is designed to organically flow with the film's narrative rather than stick out as individual pieces.". Tenma credits Pa Ranjith with bringing him into films.

== Politics ==
Tenma has been vocal about various political issues through his music. He has also spoken out about the caste and class divide within the music community and has advocated for equal representation in the arts, saying that "Most artists from minority groups have been only presented as a novelty" and that there are a whole host of issues that need to be addressed. He has also said "For some artistes, their music is politics. For some, their existence is itself politics."

In fact, a discussion of the relationship between politics and art with director Pa Ranjith is what led to the formation of The Casteless Collective. The topics they deal with range from LGBTQ issues, gender inequality, to caste-based issues such as reservation and manual scavenging. In addition, Tenma also talks about how protest culture is portrayed as being angry and emotionless but says that it can come from a very rich heritage and how it can be a topic of identity.

== Discography ==
=== Independent ===
Year	Album	Artist/Band	Genre	Track listing	Role
2008	Psychobabble	Blind Image	Thrash Metal	Skin; Shit Happens; Bomb in the Cake; Effigy; Psychobabble; Say No More; Read my Lips; Kiss of Anarchy	Bassplayer
2014	Azhagu Puratchi	Kaber Vasuki	Singer/ Songwriter	Ulagathin Sonthakaren; Pachai Perunthu; Pirai Kadhai; Manda Mannan Kaviyam; Karpanai Kadathal; Chennai Paadal	Music Producer/ Arranger
2018	Magizhchi	The Casteless Collective	World Music / Folk	Beef; Magizhchi; Tik Tik; Nanga Platform; Quota; Vivasayam; Vada Chennai; Kaalu Rooba Dhuddu; Othadi	Composer, Bassplayer, Singer, Music Producer

=== Singles ===
Year	Track	Artist/Band	Genre	Role
2017	Manitha subhavam	Kurangan	Reggae	Music Producer
2016	Vasanam	Kurangan	Easy Listening	Music Producer
2017	Vilangu	Kurangan	Pop	Music Producer
2018	Rendu Perum	Kurangan	Post Punk	Music Producer
2018	David Foster Wallace	Kurangan	Pop	Music Producer
2019	Rasathi	Kurangan	Funk Rock	Music Producer
2016	Naan Enna Muttala	Kaber and Tenma	Pop	Music Producer
2016	Poromboke Song	Kaber and Tenma	Pop	Music Producer
2018	Jai Bhim	The Casteless Collective	World Music/ Folk	Music Producer
2019	Dabba Dabba	The Casteless Collective	World Music/ Folk	Music Producer
2019	Thalaiva	The Casteless Collective	World Music/ Folk	Music Producer
2021	Vaiyulla Pulla	The Casteless Collective	World Music/ Folk	Music Producer
2020	Marley ft Gaana Muthu	Tenma	Reggaton	Music Producer
2020	Pandemic Story	Harish Kamble	Hip Hop	Music Producer
2020	Daddy Daddy	Vijay Varadharaj	Hip Hop	Music producer

=== Games ===
Title	Studio	Role
Harbinger Wars: Battle for Las Vegas (8-bit) (2013)	Valiant	Audio Director, Sound Designer and composer
Kochadaiyaan: Reign of Arrows (2014)	Gameshastra	Sound Designer, composer
Kochadiyan: The game (2014)	Gameshastra	Sound Designer and composer

=== Filmography ===
Year	Film	Genre	Role	Notes	Label
2019	Irandam Ulagaporin Kadaisi Gundu	Action/ Drama	Music Director	Debut Film	Think Music
2020	This is My Hood	Docu-Series	Himself	A series covering the stories of people who keep the hip-hop scene in India Alive	
2020	Breaking Barriers	Documentary	Himself	The Casteless Collective Documentary	
2020	The Casteless Collective: Prologue	Documentary	Himself		
2022	Victim	Thriller	Music Director	Anthology web series; Segment: Dhammam	
2022	Pothanur Thabal Nilayam	Thriller	Music Director	Heist Film	Think Music
2022	Natchathiram Nagargiradhu	Romantic Drama	Music Director		
