= Dalit Subbaiah =

Tamil Musical artist

- Also known as: Lenin Subbaiah
- Born: Pichai; 24 October 1952; Muniyandipatti, Madurai District, Madras State (now Tamil Nadu), India
- Died: 16 February 2022 (aged 69) Puducherry, Puducherry UT, India
- Genres: Dalit music
- Occupations: Singer, writer, lyricist, poet
- Instrument: Vocals
- Formerly of: Tamil Evangelical Lutheran Church (TELC)
- Spouse: Suppulechmie

Karuppan Pichai (24 October 1952– 14 February 2022), popularly known as Lenin Subbaiah or Dalit Subbaiah, was an Indian singer, writer, lyricist, and poet known for his contributions to social awareness music and Dalit music. He gained prominence for his advocacy for the rights and empowerment of Dalits through his songs.

== Early life ==
Subbaiah was born on 24 October 1952 in Muniyandipatti, a village near Melur in present-day Madurai District, Tamil Nadu. His father, Karuppan, was a Siddha physician, while his mother was deaf-mute. His parents named him Pichai (the alms given to beggars), but his elementary school teacher changed his name to Subbaiah to make it more dignified. The instructor who broke this caste taboo was punished because of this - a thug from the dominant caste raped his eldest daughter.

== Career ==
Subbaiah made contacts with left-wing activists at Madurai Thiyagarajar College, which helped his career as a musician and activist take off. He also did Masters from American College, Madurai and Law from Bangalore.

Dalit Subbiah's musical journey gained momentum during the Dalit Art Nights organized by the Dalit Resource Center in Madurai in the 1980s. Subbaiah has worked with a number of groups, such as the Tamil Evangelical Lutheran Church (TELC), which published his songbooks under the title Isaipor (War of Music). There are 82 songs in this volume, and then there are 66 songs in his second volume. He authored eight books and also owned and operated Spartacus Publishing.

=== Notable Songs ===
- Vella Mudiyathavar Ambedkar (Ambedkar is unconquerable)
- Thamizhakathin Azhakiya mukam- Athu Periyar (The beautiful face of Tamil Nadu –that is Periyar)

=== Notable Books ===
- யுத்தம் துவங்கட்டும் (War Begins)
- பாவம் இந்த பாரத பெண்கள் (The Sufferings of Indian Women)
- இசைப் போர் (War of Music) - தீர்க்கப்படாத கணக்குகள் (Unsolved Equations)
- எளிய மாந்தர்களின் அரிய செய்தி (Noble Deeds of Ordinary People)
- யோக்கியர்கள் வருகின்றார்கள் (The Yogis Are Coming)
- காலத்தை வென்ற களத்துப் பாடல்கள் (Songs that Conquered Time)

== Personal life ==
After landing a job at a government high school, he wed Suppulechmie, a Tamil Malaysian. Their first son was named Spartacus after Spartacus (one of Karl Marx's favourite heroes), and the second son was named Gorky after Maxim Gorky (from whom Subbaiah drew inspiration for his cultural activities).

== See also ==
- Dalit music
- Dalit literature
