= Pa. Ranjith =

Indian film director, producer and screenwriter (born 1982)

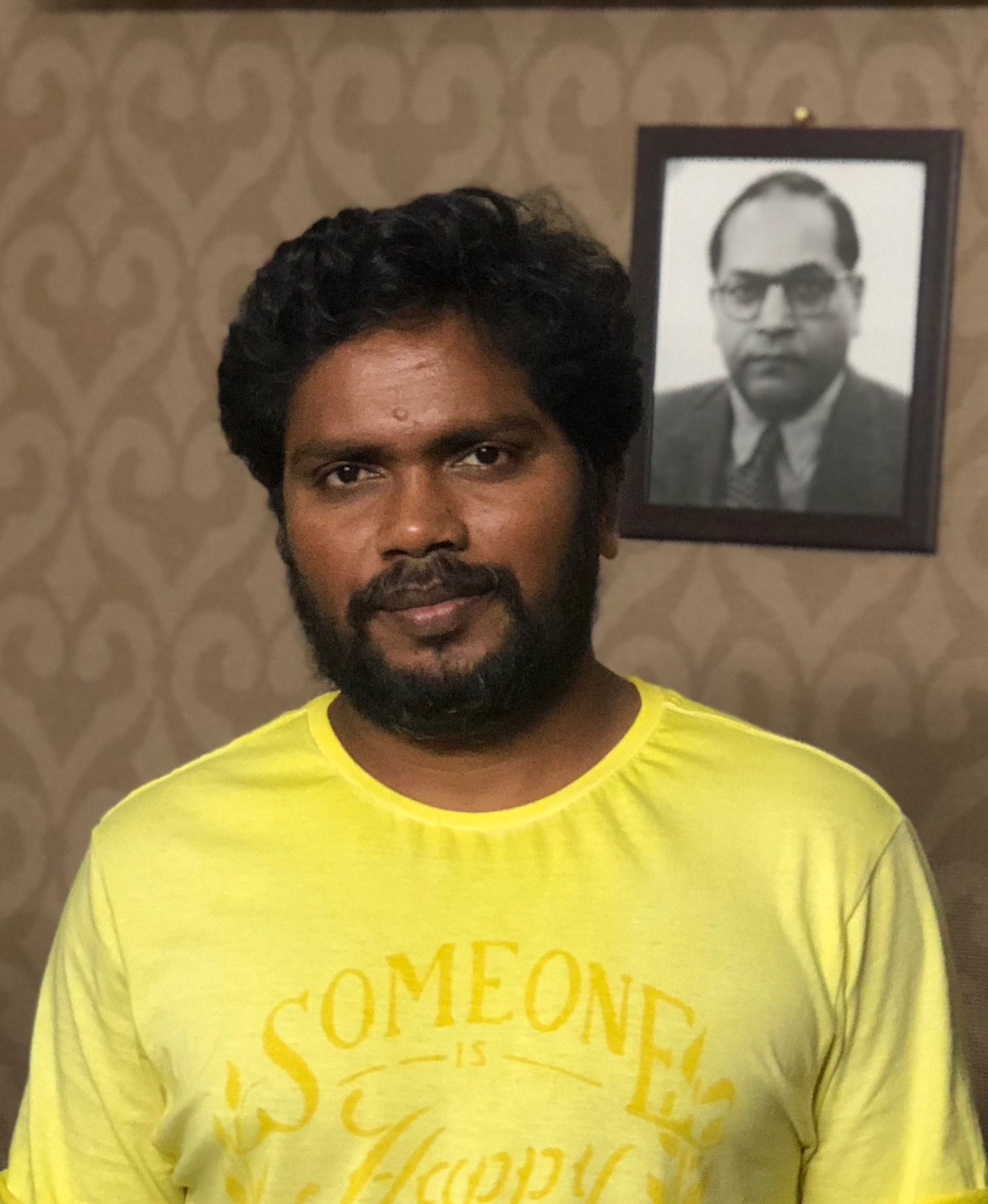
- Pa. Ranjith
- Born: Pa. Ranjith; 8 December 1982 (age 43); Karalapakkam, Avadi, Tamil Nadu, India
- Education: Government College of Fine Arts, Chennai
- Occupations: Film director; Film producer; Screenwriter
- Years active: 2012–present
- Organization: Neelam
- Spouse: Anitha
- Children: 2

Pa. Ranjith (born 8 December 1982) is an Indian film director, producer and screenwriter who primarily works in Tamil cinema. He made his directorial debut with the 2012 romantic comedy Attakathi, before earning positive reviews for his second film, the political action-drama Madras (2014). He wrote and directed the action-drama films Kabali (2016) and Kaala (2018), both starring Rajinikanth. He is also the founder of Neelam, a socio-cultural organisation and film production house.

== Early and personal life ==
Pa. Ranjith was born on 8 December 1982 in Karalapakkam, Avadi, Chennai. He has two brothers, Prabhu and Saravana. He graduated from Government College of Fine Arts, Chennai, and has described how his travels to and from his college often helped create inspiration for film ideas.

During college, he joined the film chamber and began watching world cinema, regularly attending annual film festivals. He gained inspiration from films including The Battle of Algiers (1966), and City of God (2002), stating they had a deep impact on him and changed his thinking of cinema.

Ranjith joined the film industry as an assistant director and first worked on Shiva Shanmugam's Thagapansamy (2006), which he has referred to as an "unmemorable stint", before moving on to apprentice under filmmaker Venkat Prabhu. He initially helped prepare a storyboard for a Malaysian album that Venkat Prabhu had been working on in 2006, before gaining trust and being allowed to work closely with him during the making of Chennai 600028 (2007). Ranjith is married to Anitha, and they have two children.

== Film career ==
Ranjith was introduced to a newcomer producer C. V. Kumar in 2011 by a mutual friend, Mani, who convinced Kumar to give Ranjith an opportunity to make a film. Consequently, Attakathi was completed in fifty days on a shoe-string budget of ₹1.75 crores. Following promising pre-release reviews, the venture became bigger when production house Studio Green chose to buy the distribution rights. The film opened to positive review in August 2012, with Rediff.com noting the film "looks at youth and romance in a most refreshing way" and added that Ranjith should take "the credit, completely, of taking an ordinary storyline and infusing it with warmth and hilarity." Sify's critic, similarly, wrote "we recommend that you make time for this charming little treat of a film, as it has an inherent sweetness and honesty that will stay with you".

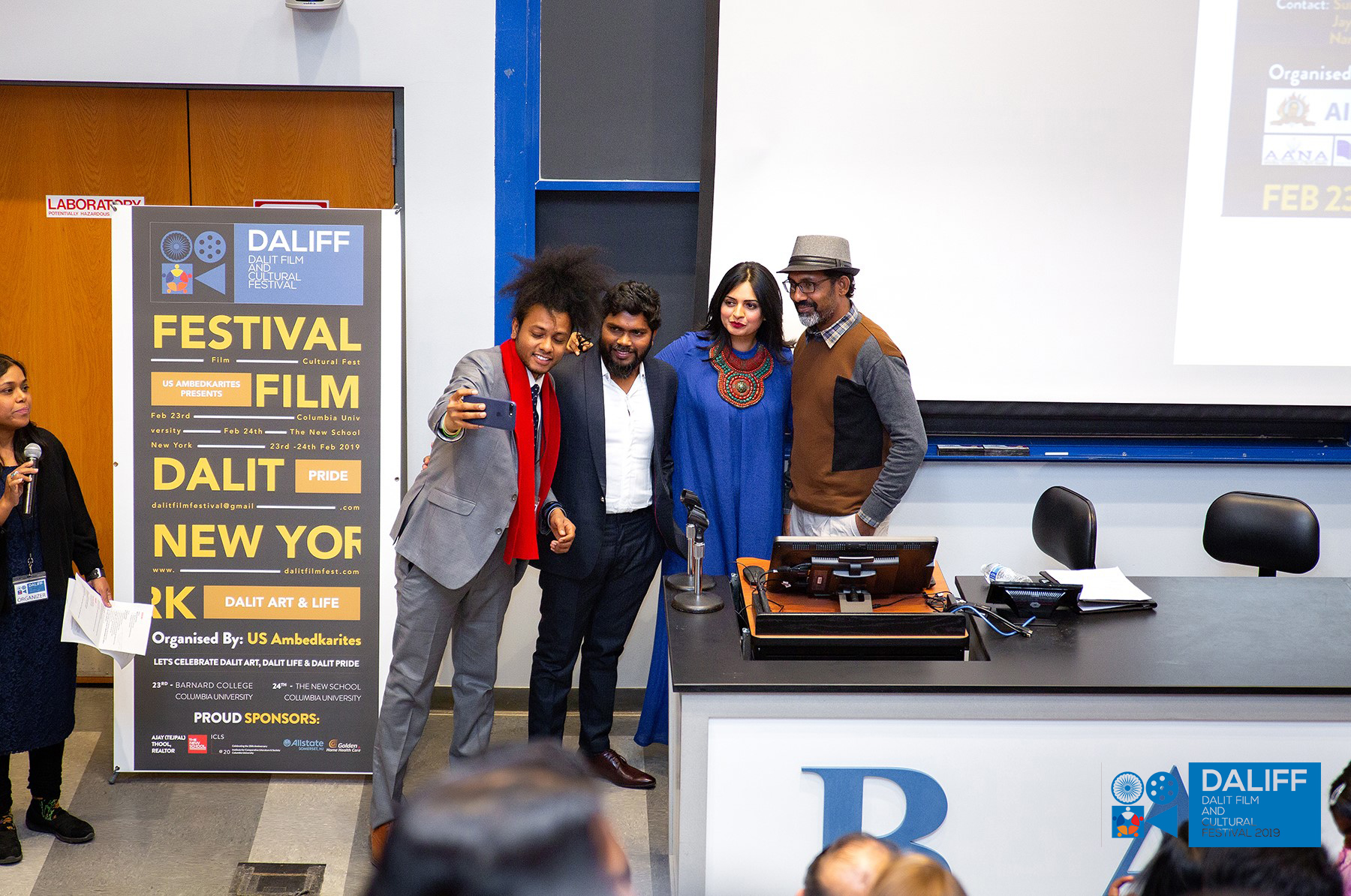
(L to R) Suraj Yengde, Pa. Ranjith, Niharika Singh, and Nagraj Manjule taking a selfie at the Dalit Film Festival in New York City in 2019.

Studio Green signed up Pa. Ranjith to direct a film for them and in December 2012, he confirmed that he would shortly begin work on a project titled Sarpatta Paramparai, with Karthi in the lead role, though the production was subsequently delayed and did not take off as planned. In July 2013, it was announced that the pair would collaborate on a new script and that Sarpatta Parambarai and their ongoing venture, Madras, were two different scripts. Although the producers liked both scripts, Ranjith decided to shoot Madras first as Karthi had accidentally read the script of Madras and liked its concept and characters. Ranjith also informed that some changes were made to the script to accommodate Karthi in the lead role. Also featuring Catherine Tresa and Kalaiyarasan in prominent roles, Madras told the story of a dispute over a political message written on wall in North Chennai and how the region's political rivalry affects the inhabitants. Upon release, it received highly positive reviews from critics, who praised the performances of the actors, as well as the technical aspects of the film. Udhav Naig, writing for The Hindu said, "Rarely does one get to see a Tamil film that reflects the social reality so closely and sketching a detailed account of life that the middle and the upper middle class know little about. Full marks to Pa. Ranjith for that". Writing for The New Indian Express, Malini Mannath said, "With an engaging screenplay, deft narration, well fleshed out characters and actors well cast, Madras captures the feel, flavour and ambiance of North Madras with perfect precision". Sify said, "Madras works big time as writer and director Ranjith has given priority to his script, which hooks the audiences straightaway. It is a triumph of honest writing and heartfelt dialogues. It is a gutsy and outstanding film".

He began pre-production work for a venture starring Suriya in October 2014, after the actor approached him being impressed with Madras. The project was put on hold, after Soundarya Rajinikanth approached him for a story and he began working on Kabali (2016), featuring Rajinikanth in the titular role. It released in theatres on 22 July 2016 and received mixed reviews from critics. However, it took a huge opening and was Tamil cinema's highest grosser at the time.

His next film, Kaala (2018), a socio-political thriller also starring Rajinikanth in the titular role, was released worldwide on 7 June 2018. It was the first Indian film ever to be released in Saudi Arabia, following the country lifting its ban on public theatres in December 2017. Like Kabali, it too received mixed reviews from the critics. The Times of India rated the film 3.5 out of 5 and stated that Ranjith owes to his excellent technical crew for "helping him visualise and deliver this 51% Rajini-49% Ranjith movie". In 2024, Kaala was listed in the British Film Institute’s Sight and Sound magazine’s '25 Films of the 21st century,' making it the only Indian film to be included.

Pa. Ranjith marked his foray into production under his production house, Neelam Productions, with the release of two documentaries titled Dr. Shoe Maker and Beware of Castes: Mirchpur. Under Neelam Productions, he also produced Mari Selvaraj's Pariyerum Perumal that starred Kathir and Anandhi, with music by Santhosh Narayanan. Pariyerum Perumal went on to become a huge success with critical acclaim. Neelam Productions' next project has been titled as Irandam Ulagaporin Kadaisi Gundu. The film stars Attakathi Dinesh and is directed by Athiyan Athirai.

In 2019, Ranjith's worked on a Hindi-language biopic on freedom fighter Birsa Munda. The film, which was to be the Tamil filmmaker's first non-Tamil project, was scheduled to be produced by Namah Pictures, which had co-produced Iranian filmmaker Majid Majidi's Beyond the Clouds in 2018. The cast of Ranjith's film has not been announced.

Ranjith shelved the Birsa Munda film, and wrote the script of Sarpatta Parambarai with Suriya in mind, but due to his prior commitments, he later approached Arya to play the lead role. The film was eventually supposed to begin production in during February and March 2020, after the hard training sessions of the actors being involved in the film, but due to the COVID-19 pandemic induced lockdown, the production delayed further and eventually began in September 2020 which was completed within December 2020, with filming taking place for nearly four months in and around North Chennai. The film's technical crew comprises music director Santhosh Narayanan, cinematographer Murali G. and editor Selva R. K.

In 2021, he directed Sarpatta Parambarai, a period sports film. The film stars Arya, Dushara Vijayan, and Pasupathy. Set in the 1970s North Chennai, the film revolves around a clash between two clans namely Idiyappa Parambarai and Sarpatta Parambara, which also display the boxing culture in the locality and also the politics behind it. Sarpatta Parambarai was initially scheduled for theatrical release which was delayed due to the COVID-19 pandemic, It was then released to Amazon Prime Video on 22 July 2021, coinciding with the Prime Day celebrations.

In 2022, Ranjith worked on an episode of the anthology series Victim titled Dhammam. The episode starred Guru Somasundaram, Kalaiyarasan, Hari Krishnan, and Lizzie Anthony. In July 2022, Ranjith unveiled the first look poster for his next film Natchathiram Nagargiradhu, a film about the politics behind love, starring Dushara Vijayan, Kalidas Jayaram, and Kalaiyarasan in the lead roles. The film was released in theaters on 31 August 2022, and received generally positive reviews from critics and audiences.

Ranjith unveiled the first look poster for his next project Vettuvam at the 2022 Cannes Film Festival. Produced by his own production house Neelam Studios along with Golden Ratio films, the project is reportedly being developed as both a feature film and a TV series. The project is said to be about a rural gangster's rise to power and how his rivals harness the power of the state in an attempt to bring him down. Vettuvam is expected to start production in 2023. On 13 July 2025, stuntman SM Raju lost his life in a tragic accident while shooting a car chase scene in Vettuvam.

== Other work ==
Ranjith extended his social work in another form, which is 'Neelam Panpaatu Maiyam' (Neelam Cultural Center). As part of this initiative, in honour of the 100 years of Dalit struggle, life-sized sculptures were established and the efforts of the Dalit activists were documented. Neelam Panpaatu Maiyam also conducted four editions of the three day arts festival - 'Vaanam Art Festival' in Chennai from 2018 to 2023. The festival was unticketed and many artists across Tamil Nadu participated in it. Also many artifacts were presented. Ranjith explained that this festival would act as a platform to discuss more complex social issues through art.

Neelam cultural center launched 'Koogai Thiraipada Iyakkam' (Koogai Film Movement). This movement was started to bridge the gap between literature and cinema. As part of this movement, the first initiative was to set up a library named 'Koogai'. It rolled out their new campaign '#VoteOutHate' and started producing short films on the same for a release in their official YouTube channel. The first film was Lovers in the afternoon directed by Rajesh Rajamani and the second film was 'Share Auto' directed by Jenny Dolly.

== The Casteless Collective ==
Ranjith's organisation, Neelam Cultural Centre, collaborated with the label Madras Records to form a 19-piece band called The Casteless Collective that includes four rappers, seven instrumentalists and eight gaana musicians, a popular folk music style in Tamil Nadu. The name of the band was inspired by a phrase – "jaathi bedha matra Tamilargal" – used by Tamil anti-caste activist and writer C Iyothee Thassa Pandithar (1845-1914), who was the first to moot the phrase "Jaathi Bedha Matra Tamizhargal" in the early 20th century by publishing the same in his Tamil Journal Tamizhan (1907-1914).

== Filmography ==
=== As director ===
Year	Film	Notes
2012	Attakathi	
2014	Madras	
2016	Kabali	
2018	Kaala	
2021	Sarpatta Parambarai	
2022	Natchathiram Nagargiradhu	
2024	Thangalaan	
2026	Vettuvam †	Post Production
Year	Web Series	Notes
2022	Victim	Anthology web series; Segment: Dhammam

=== As producer ===
Year	Film	Notes
2018	Pariyerum Perumal	
2019	Irandam Ulagaporin Kadaisi Gundu	
2021	Writer	
2022	Seththumaan	
2023	Bommai Nayagi	
2024	Blue Star	
2024	J Baby	
2025	Bottle Radha	
2025	Papa Buka	Papua New Guinea-India co-production
2025	Thandakaaranyam	
2025	Bison Kaalamaadan	

=== As distributor ===
Year	Film	Notes
2022	Kuthiraivaal	Produced By Yazhi Films Vignesh Sundaresan

== Awards and nominations ==
Year	Film	Award	Category	Outcome	Ref
2012	Attakathi	Jaya TV Awards	Best Director	Won	
2014	Madras	Ananda Vikatan Cinema Awards	Best Director	Won	
2014	Madras	Ananda Vikatan Cinema Awards	Best Story	Won	
2014	Madras	Edison Awards	Best Director	Won	
2014	Madras	Filmfare Awards South	Best Director – Tamil	Nominated	
2014	Madras	South Indian International Movie Awards	Best Director – Tamil	Won	
2014	Madras	Vijay Awards	Best Director	Won	
2016	Kabali	Edison Awards	Best Director	Won	
2016	Kabali	Filmfare Awards South	Best Director	Nominated	
2016	Kabali	IIFA Utsavam	Best Director	Nominated	
2018	Kaala	Ananda Vikatan Cinema Awards	Best Dialogue writer	Won	
2018	Pariyerum Perumal	Behindwoods Gold medal	Best Producer	Won	
2018	Pariyerum Perumal	Norway Tamil Film Awards	Best Film	Won	
2018	Pariyerum Perumal	Edison Awards	Best Film	Won	
2018	Pariyerum Perumal	South Indian International Movie Awards	Best Film – Tamil	Won	
2018	Pariyerum Perumal	Filmfare Awards South	Best Film – Tamil	Won	
2021	Sarpatta Parambarai	Galatta Crown Awards	Best Director	Won	
2021	Sarpatta Parambarai	South Indian International Movie Awards	Best Film – Tamil	Won	
2022	Natchathiram Nagargiradhu	Ananda Vikatan Cinema Awards	Best Film	Won	
