= Attakathi =

2012 film directed by Pa. Ranjith

- Theatrical release poster
- Directed by: Pa. Ranjith
- Written by: Pa. Ranjith
- Produced by: C. V. Kumar
- Starring: Dinesh; Nandita Swetha; Aishwarya Rajesh
- Cinematography: P. K. Varma
- Edited by: Leo John Paul
- Music by: Santhosh Narayanan
- Production company: Thirukumaran Entertainment
- Distributed by: Studio Green
- Release date: 15 August 2012
- Running time: 125 minutes
- Country: India
- Language: Tamil
- Budget: ₹1.75–5 crore (Note: While Pa. Ranjith stated that the film was produced on a budget of ₹1.75 crore (US$180,000), Sify noted that the overall production cost, including print and advertising costs, were around ₹5 crore (US$520,000).)
- Box office: ₹8 crore

Attakathi (transl. Cardboard knife) is a 2012 Indian Tamil-language romantic comedy film written and directed by Pa. Ranjith and produced by C. V. Kumar under Thirukumaran Entertainment, starring Dinesh, Nandita Swetha and Aishwarya Rajesh. The film revolves around Dinakaran (Dinesh) and his relationships during his school and college life.

Attakathi marked the directorial debut of Ranjith and Kumar's maiden production, as well as the debut of several newcomers as actors and technicians, including musician Santhosh Narayanan, cinematographer P. K. Varma and editor Leo John Paul. It was shot around the exteriors of North Chennai between September and December 2011 for 50 days.

Attakathi was distributed by K. E. Gnanavel Raja's Studio Green, which released it theatrically on 15 August 2012, coinciding with Independence Day. A critical and commercial success, the film received praise for the performances, direction, screenplay and music. It also helped make Dinesh, Ranjith, Kumar and Santhosh sought-out names in the film industry.

== Plot ==
Dinakaran, referred as Atta among his friends, is a regular semi-urban teenager growing up in a small village in the outskirts of Chennai. He did well in his school exams, but failed his English paper. Rather than studying for the second attempt, he wastes time looking for a girlfriend since he has made a pact with his best friends; to fall in love and get married.

Dinakaran first falls for a girl he meets at the bus stop named Poornima. She appears to like him too as she smiles at him and accepts his gifts. But when he goes after her, she suddenly refers to him as 'elder brother' and tells him to stop following her around as she feels awkward. Dinakaran tries to feel sad, but he cannot since he was never really in love in the first place. It was just an infatuation. Dinakaran next starts wooing a distant relative who comes visiting at his house. Unfortunately, she turns out to have fallen in love with his elder brother. He then gets beaten up by the boys at a neighbouring village for following two of their girls. He learns martial arts to protect himself and impress the girls, but nothing of that sort works out.

Dinakaran finally gives up on falling in love and concentrates on his studies. He finally passes his English test and enrolls into the local college. He is taken under the wing of an overprotective senior, who is the self-proclaimed underground student leader whom everyone refers to as 'route thala' or designated don of a route/street. Dinakaran's life takes a sudden turn as he mixes with the wrong group. He becomes less sociable and is always involved in fights and other problems. When his senior finally graduates, he makes Dinakaran the next 'route thala.' Dinakaran takes his responsibility very seriously and is soon both respected and feared by all the students in his college.

One day, Dinakaran gets a new junior in the form of Poornima, his childhood friend and one of the girls he tried to woo as a teenager. He tries to avoid her as it reminds him of the time he was a complete loser who was constantly humiliated by his own feeble attempts to impress girls. As time passes, he cannot avoid falling in love with Poornima, especially when she shows him an old bus ticket he bought for her. She only keeps things from people she really like as a kind of memorabilia. Dinakaran is convinced that she is in love with him too, but cannot bring himself to propose to her. He even changes back to his old haircut and the usual way he used to dress just because Poornima likes it more. His family and friends tease him, which embarrasses him deeply. But once Poornima compliments him on his new look, he does not mind any more.

Things take a turn for the worse when Poornima's family finds out she is in love with someone they disapprove of and they fix an arranged marriage for her. Dinakaran panics and recruits his old friends to help him out. His parents seemingly allow him to leave home and bless his actions. Most of his friend decide to arrange for Dinakaran to elope with Poornima with the help of their relatives, though one of them disagrees as he feels they should ask Poornima how she really feels and then decide what they should do. However, Dinakaran becomes impatient and goes after Poornima, only to face her elder brother in an ensuing fight. Dinakaran manage to escape and waits for Poornima at the place they had arranged to meet, but she never shows up.

Dinakaran then takes the public bus back home, where he meets Poornima. As it turns out, she was never in love with Dinakaran in the first place. Her lover was another boy named Dinakaran, which made her family assume he was the one she was in love with all the while. While her family was busy going after Dinakaran, Poornima had already married the other Dinakaran and was now on the way to watch a movie with her newly wedded husband. Dinakaran is heartbroken, but cannot stay sad forever, and bounces back quickly as he soon realises he was never in love with Poornima at all, it was all just a phase of infatuation once again.

Post-credits it reveals that Dinakaran studied hard and managed to become a teacher, while taking care of his mother and has finally tied the knot.

== Cast ==
- Dinesh as Dinakaran
- Nandita Swetha as Poornima
- Aishwarya as Amudha
- Kalaiyarasan as Dinakaran (cameo)
- Vishwanath as Dinakaran's brother
- Sophia as Divya
- Shalini as Nadhiya
- Mahendran as Mahendran
- Jangiri Madhumitha as Poornima's friend
- Dhilsa
- Hari Krishnan as Dinakaran's friend
- Yogi Babu as Dinakaran's friend
- Abi Saravanan

== Production ==
Attakathi marked the directorial debut of Pa. Ranjith who earlier assisted Venkat Prabhu as a co-director in Goa (2010) and also the maiden film production of C. V. Kumar's Thirukumaran Entertainment which was established in 2010. The film was titled as such as it denoted the protagonist's character, stating: "Attakathi means a knife made out of cardboard. It serves only as a showpiece; you can never fight with it. My hero is just like that! 'all fluff and no stuff'". Ranjith admitted that "there are many villages around Chennai which could pass off for a remote village near Madurai, but culturally, they are very urban"; the film showcased this different side of the city. Having born and brought up in Karlapakkam, near Avadi, made him equipped better to portray the lives of semi-urban teenagers. Calling it as a "realistic story about the life of people living in North Chennai with a love story woven into it", Ranjith also added that the film further showcases the bright side of the youngsters living in the local city over the conflicts they face; a common theme in young films.

Dinesh was cast in the lead role, after having played minor supporting roles in films such as Aadukalam and Mouna Guru (2011). Nandita Swetha made her Tamil film debut with this film. She stated that Ranjith had cast her as the female after watching her performance in Nanda Nanditha (2008); (Note: she was credited as Swetha) her involvement was primarily due to her strong South Indian looks. Aishwarya Rajesh was cast as the second female lead. Several other newcomers such as Kalaiyarasan, Vishwanth, Hari Krishnan, Yogi Babu, Jangiri Madhumitha, were cast in supporting roles.

Pre-production for the film began in early August 2011. The film was shot in a single schedule in an around North Chennai for fifty days from 26 September – 8 December and was made on a budget of ₹1.75 crore (US$180,000). Sify reported the production costs to be around ₹5 crore (US$520,000) including print and advertising.

== Soundtrack ==
Attakathi's soundtrack and film score were composed by newcomer Santhosh Narayanan, who previously worked as an assistant to composer A. R. Rahman. The soundtrack featured seven songs with lyrics by Kabilan, Muthamil, Gana Bala and Pradeep Kumar; one song "Nadukadalula Kappala" was composed by Gana Bala himself. It was mastered at Studios 301 in Sydney, Australia, by Grammy Award-winner Leon Zervos.

The soundtrack was released by Think Music on 9 January 2012, with a launch event held at Sathyam Cinemas, Chennai, amongst noted film personalities. It received positive reviews from critics and established Santhosh as a leading musician in Tamil film industry.

== Marketing and release ==
K. E. Gnanavel Raja acquired the film's theatrical rights under his Studio Green banner. This became the company's maiden venture outside their films that starred Suriya and Karthi. The company drew a brand-new promotional strategy by making it look different, ensuring anticipation among other Tamil releases. It was noted that it became the first Tamil film where the marketing costs were higher than the production budget, as the team spent ₹2.5 crore (US$260,000) for print and advertising costs.

A press screening was held in July 2012 for Vetrimaaran, Pandiraj, M. Rajesh and Venkat Prabhu and Karthi, who acclaimed the film upon its release. The film was released theatrically on Independence Day (15 August 2012) clashing with Naan.

== Reception ==
=== Box office ===
The film opened in 223 theatres across Tamil Nadu with a domestic collection of ₹92 lakh (US$96,000) ensuring a strong opening for the film. At the extended first weekend (15–20 August), the film earned ₹4.12 crore (US$430,000). During its theatrical run, the film secured a distributors' share of ₹4.5 crore (US$470,000) and outside Tamil Nadu, the film earned ₹75 lakh (US$78,000) from Kerala, Karnataka and overseas regions. The film generated a revenue of ₹8 crore (US$830,000) from its theatrical, satellite, dubbing and remake rights, and became a profitable venture for the producers, with a return of investment around an ₹3 crore (US$310,000).

An event was held in Chennai on 20 August 2012 to celebrate the film's success and saw the attendance of around 150 film personalities. However, many other guests could not attend the event, due to the Mirchi Music Awards South which held at the same time in Hyderabad.

=== Critical reception ===
Attakathi received mostly positive reviews upon release. The Times of India rated 4 out of 5 and wrote "Even the film's tone alarmingly gets close to being all too serious, but by then, we have been won over by this character that we are ready to forgive the lapse. And, thankfully, Ranjith too gets his groove back and gives us a delightful epilogue to end the film in style." Pavithra Srinivasan of Rediff.com rated it 3.5 out of 5 and described it as a "marvellous coming-of-age film with gentle, tongue-in-cheek humour and realistic dialogues".

Sify wrote, "The film works to a large extent the way college life and the journey in metropolitan bus service from suburban homes to college is depicted. All this is laced with romance, falling in and out of love, friendship, camaraderie, humour, hummable gaana songs, aspirations and dreams of a typical lower middle class." Vivek Ramz of In.com rated it 3.5/5 stating that it was a "small yet beautiful film with its heart at the right place. It definitely deserves a watch for its refreshing screenplay and unique treatment". In a mixed review, Malathi Rangarajan of The Hindu wrote "Attakaththi is a string of incidents, without a strong line backing it. So it isn't riveting. Going by its content and form, Attakaththi should work really well in towns and tier two and three cities." Ananda Vikatan rated the film 45 out of 100.

=== Accolades ===
Award (Note: Awards, festivals and organisations are in alphabetical order.)	Date of ceremony (Note: Date is linked to the article about the awards held that year, wherever possible.)	Category	Nominee(s)	Result	Ref.
Ananda Vikatan Cinema Awards	16 January 2013	Best Debut Actor	Dinesh	Won	
Ananda Vikatan Cinema Awards	16 January 2013	Best Male Playback Singer	Gana Bala – ("Aadi Pona Aavani" and "Nadukadalula Kappala")	Won	
Big FM Tamil Melody Awards	19 August 2013	Best Debut Music Director	Santhosh Narayanan (Note: also for Pizza)	Won	
Big FM Tamil Melody Awards	19 August 2013	Best Male Playback Singer	Pradeep Kumar – ("Aasai Oru Pulveli")	Nominated	
Chennai Times Film Awards	4 November 2013	Best Music Director	Santhosh Narayanan	Nominated	
Chennai Times Film Awards	4 November 2013	Best Lyricist	Kabilan – ("Aasai Oru Pulveli")	Nominated	
Chennai Times Film Awards	4 November 2013	Best Singer (Male)	Gana Bala – ("Nadukadalula Kappala")	Nominated	
Chennai Times Film Awards	4 November 2013	Promising Newcomer (Male)	Dinesh	Nominated	
Chennai Times Film Awards	4 November 2013	Promising Newcomer (Female)	Nandita Swetha	Nominated	
Chennai Times Film Awards	4 November 2013	Best Youth Film	Attakathi	Nominated	
Edison Awards	10 February 2013	Best Music Director	Santhosh Narayanan	Nominated	
Edison Awards	10 February 2013	Best Lyricist	Kabilan – ("Aasai Oru Pulveli")	Nominated	
Edison Awards	10 February 2013	Best Male Playback Singer	Gana Bala – ("Aadi Pona Aavani")	Nominated	
Edison Awards	10 February 2013	Best Debut Actor	Dinesh	Nominated	
Edison Awards	10 February 2013	Best Debut Actress	Nandita Swetha	Nominated	
Edison Awards	10 February 2013	Best Debut Director	Pa. Ranjith	Nominated	
Jaya TV Awards	28 December 2012	Best Actor	Dinesh	Won	
Jaya TV Awards	28 December 2012	Best Director	Pa. Ranjith	Won	
Jaya TV Awards	28 December 2012	Best Music Director	Santhosh Narayanan	Won	
Jaya TV Awards	28 December 2012	Best Producer	C. V. Kumar	Won	
Jaya TV Awards	28 December 2012	Sensational Debutant Actress	Nandita Swetha	Won	
Mirchi Music Awards South	26 August 2013	Lyricist of the Year	Kabilan – ("Aasai Oru Pulveli")	Nominated	
Mirchi Music Awards South	26 August 2013	Upcoming Male Vocalist of the Year	Pradeep Kumar – ("Aasai Oru Pulveli")	Won	
Mirchi Music Awards South	26 August 2013	Upcoming Lyricist of the Year	Gana Bala – ("Nadukadalula Kappala")	Nominated	
Mirchi Music Awards South	26 August 2013	Mannin Kural Male Vocalist of the Year	Gana Bala – ("Nadukadalula Kappala")	Nominated	
Mirchi Music Awards South	26 August 2013	Mannin Kural Male Vocalist of the Year	Gana Bala – ("Aadi Pona Aavani")	Nominated	
Mirchi Music Awards South	26 August 2013	Technical – Sound Mixing of the Year	R. K. Sundar – ("Aadi Pona Aavani")	Nominated	
Norway Tamil Film Festival Awards	24–28 April 2013	Best Debut Producer	C. V. Kumar	Won	
South Indian International Movie Awards	12–13 September 2013	Best Debut Producer – Tamil	C. V. Kumar	Won	
South Indian International Movie Awards	12–13 September 2013	Best Male Debut – Tamil	Dinesh	Nominated	
Vijay Awards	11 May 2013	Best Debut Actor	Dinesh	Nominated	
Vijay Awards	11 May 2013	Best Debut Actress	Nandita Swetha	Nominated	
Vijay Awards	11 May 2013	Best Male Playback Singer	Gana Bala – ("Nadukadalula Kappala")	Nominated	
Vijay Awards	11 May 2013	Best Lyricist	Gana Bala – ("Nadukadalula Kappala")	Nominated	
Vijay Awards	11 May 2013	Face of the Year	Dinesh	Nominated	

== Legacy ==
Attakathi emerged a breakthrough for the lead actor Dinesh, who then became known as "Attakathi Dinesh", as well as for the other principal cast members, director Ranjith, producer Kumar, music composer Santhosh Narayanan. Kumar's Thirukumaran Entertainment was established as one of the leading film production companies in Tamil cinema, which became noted for several innovative and critically acclaimed films and bringing new talents in terms of actors and technicians. Ranjith considered Attakathi one of his favourite works.

Attakathi was signified to the contributing factor of anti-caste films being produced in Tamil cinema, after several caste-pride films which based on intermediate landowning castes became a recurring genre in the 1980s and 1990s. Sowmya Rajendran noted that the portrayal of a Dalit protagonist is the first instance "a Dalit man's way of life was presented without apology", and The News Minute-based Bharathy Singarvel also admitted on caste being signalled subtly through dialogues and images throughout the film.

In K. Raju's novel The Dalit Truth: The Battles For Realizing Ambedkar's Vision, Ranjith recalled an incident where when the crew started filming for the protagonist's entry scene, one of the production executives insisted Ranjith to halt the filming abruptly as Ranjith had a photograph of Ambedkar in the protagonist's house and if that retained, the film would not work among the audiences in Madurai. This upset Ranjith felt, who convinced the technicians and production executives to retain the photograph and continued shooting, he added "Since the on-location shoot was in villages where Dalits lived in large numbers, we finally did have Ambedkar in our footage—he was on every village wall, and there were umpteen statues everywhere." Ranjith further assured the producers and distributors that the film would work commercially with its politics notwithstanding.

Attakathi was also attributed to the resurgence of the gaana—a popular folk genre originated and was predominant in the North Chennai. Gaana songs established its popularity in the 1990s, with composer Deva bringing gaana songs in films but faded eventually in the 2000s. Ranjith added that the two songs—"Aadi Pona Aavani" and "Nadukadalula Kappala"—were composed by not diluting the essence of the genre for commercial viability, resulting its success. Its singer Gana Bala also attained popularity with the two songs.
