= Thangalaan =

2024 Indian film by Pa. Ranjith

- Theatrical release poster
- Directed by: Pa. Ranjith
- Written by: Tamil Prabha; Pa. Ranjith
- Dialogues by: Azhagiya Periyavan; Tamil Prabha
- Produced by: K. E. Gnanavel Raja
- Starring: Vikram; Malavika Mohanan; Pasupathy; Parvathy Thiruvothu; Daniel Caltagirone
- Cinematography: A. Kishor Kumar
- Edited by: Selva R. K.
- Music by: G. V. Prakash Kumar
- Production companies: Studio Green; Neelam Productions
- Distributed by: see below
- Release date: 15 August 2024
- Running time: 156 minutes
- Country: India
- Language: Tamil
- Budget: est. ₹100–150 crore
- Box office: est. ₹68–100 crore (Note: Thangalaan's reported worldwide grosses vary between ₹68 crore – ₹100 crore (The Statesman and Zee News))

Thangalaan (transl. Son of Gold) is a 2024 Indian Tamil-language action adventure film directed by Pa. Ranjith, who co-wrote the script with Tamil Prabha and Azhagiya Periyavan. It is produced by K. E. Gnanavel Raja under Studio Green. The film stars Vikram in five roles, along with Malavika Mohanan, Pasupathy, Parvathy Thiruvothu, and Daniel Caltagirone. During the British Raj era, a fierce tribal leader sets out to stop an apparent sorceress, after earning her wrath when assisting a British general in tracing gold in their village.

The film was officially announced in December 2021 under the tentative title Chiyaan 61, as it is Vikram's 61st film as a lead actor, and the official title was announced in October 2022. Principal photography commenced the same month and wrapped by early-July 2023. Filming locations included Chennai, Andhra Pradesh, Madurai and Karnataka. The film has music composed by G. V. Prakash Kumar, cinematography handled by A. Kishor Kumar, and editing by Selva RK.

Thangalaan was released worldwide on 15 August 2024 in standard, 3D and EPIQ formats, coinciding with India's Independence Day. The film received mixed reviews from critics who praised Vikram's performance, Prakash Kumar's music, the storyline and action, but criticized the historical inaccuracies, visual effects, pacing and writing. It was a box office failure.

== Plot ==
In 1850, in the village of Veppur, North Arcot, Thangalaan resides with his wife, Gengamma, and their children. As the village chief and a landowner, he is highly respected, unlike most of his fellow villagers who are bonded labourers on the zamindar's land. Thangalaan often regales his children with bedtime stories, and one night, he narrates a chilling tale about Aarathi, a woman from the Nagar tribe, believed to be a sorceress and protector of the land in the deep forests.

Thangalaan's great-grandfather, Kaadaiyan, belonged to a tribe skilled in extracting gold from the Ponnar river sand. When a king, passing through the area, discovered the mountain's gold veins, he sought Kaadaiyan's expertise to retrieve the gold. However, Aarathi had set up obstacles, including snakes, to safeguard the territory. Kaadaiyan initially refused to help the king but was promised the land his forefathers had lost to the king's ancestors, which had been gifted to the Brahmanas. Kaadaiyan eventually agreed, but the king found the retrieved gold rocks fake, attributing it to Aarathi's sorcery. The enraged king beheaded a Buddha statue after being urged by a Brahmin priest, who cited Buddha as a sorcerer. A fierce battle ensued between Aarathi and Kaadaiyan's men, resulting in Kaadaiyan slitting Aarathi's abdomen, unleashing a torrent of blood that flowed over the land, transforming the sand into gold.

Gengamma interrupts Thangalaan's storytelling as their children have already fallen asleep. In an attempt to seize Thangalaan's land, the zamindar's men set fire to the farm produce, rendering Thangalaan unable to pay the taxes. Consequently, his land is transferred to the zamindar, and Thangalaan and his family are forced into debt bondage. Meanwhile, British officer Lord Clement arrives in Veppur, seeking gold, and is aware of the villagers' ancestral expertise in tracing it. The villagers fear Aarathi, but Thangalaan, his son, Asokan, fellow villagers Varadhan, Gengupattar, and others embark on a journey northwest. Thangalaan begins hallucinating Aarathi's presence, warning him away from the forest, but he presses on, overcoming challenges like a river, a black panther, a sandstorm, and snakes.

Upon reaching a trench created by a lightning strike, Asokan discovers the beheaded Buddha statue, and Aarathi frightens him from underwater. Undeterred, they find the remaining remnants of the statue with gold traces at the bottom. However, during the gold extraction, lightning strikes Clement's son. Clement vows to find the gold ore at any cost, thanking Thangalaan for leading them to the site and gifting him his son's clothes. Clement also provides daily wages, while Thangalaan returns to the village, boasting of better pay and respect. He gifts the village women blouses, tempting them to join the gold mining effort. The entire village, including the women, set off to the barren forest, only to meet their fellow villagers lamenting for being exploited by British and Indian middlemen, who had deprived them of necessities, as they had only found a few iron and silver ores. Thangalaan remains resolute in his gold pursuit at the same site despite Asokan getting possessed with Aarathi and warning the group to abandon the mining work and return to their village. Thangalaan, however, recalls his dream and finds a small rock matching the one in his dream, insisting on digging the lode deposits nearby.

But, snakes attack him, one of which fatally bites his younger daughter. Aarathi's intervention prevents Thangalaan from saving her. Despite the lack of food, wages, and amenities, Clement, with Thangalaan's help, continues the work, and they discover a deep, abandoned mine. As they enter it, Thangalaan recognizes a place similar to his dream and finds streaks of gold. In the chaos that follows, the British claim the gold as their own, leading to a fight in which Arasani is shot. However, the gold stones were just clay, courtesy of Aarathi's sorcery. Their settlements are destroyed in a fire, but they are given hope to continue mining. The starving population spots a buffalo, which Thangalaan reminisces of Aarathi and kills the buffalo, after which they all consume. Later, he motivates the group to dig deeper, where Aarathi, in her present birth, appears with her men, attacking them ruthlessly. Aarathi subdues Thangalaan, using her sorcery to reveal his past lives. Thangalaan recalls being Arasan "Aaran", a tribal king, and his wife, Aarathi, in the 5th century, protecting the land's resources, mainly gold. Aarathi safeguarded the land while Aaran set off to fight trespassers but was defeated and, in his subsequent births as Adhi Muni, Kaadaiyan, and Naga Muni, he became a slave to dominant communities, facing discrimination and ostracism.

Their oppressors forced him and his men to labour and extract gold. Thangalaan pleads with Aarathi, acknowledging their duty to protect the land and prioritising the community's welfare, which was neglected. The dying Aarathi grants permission for Thangalaan to fetch the gold, but only for his community's benefit. Enraged by Clement's attack on Aarathi, which fatally slit her abdomen, Thangalaan kills him and the other officers, declaring that the land and its resources are hereby their own, not to be exploited by foreigners. With newfound determination, Thangalaan single-handedly ventures deep into the mine and finally discovers an abundance of native gold, bringing joy to his community. At the end of the film, when another group of British and Indian troops arrived, Thangalaan and the villagers were defending the place.

== Cast ==
- Vikram in five roles as:
  - Thangalaan Muni
  - Kaadaiyan
  - Arasan "Aaran"
  - Adhi Muni
  - Naga Muni
- Malavika Mohanan as Aarathi
- Pasupathy as Gengupattar
- Parvathy Thiruvothu as Gangammal
- Daniel Caltagirone as Lord Clement
- Anandsami as Kailasam
- Vettai Muthukumar as the pannaiyar
- Hari Krishnan as Varadhan
- Lockup Chandrakumar as Muniyan
- Arjun Prabhakaran as Asokan
- Krish Hassan as Gengupattar's son
- Preethy Karan as Arasani
- Poorva Dharani as Gunavathy
- Ben as Arthur
- Ishaan as William
- Sampath Ram as Kaadaiyan's aide

== Production ==
=== Development ===
While working on Madras (2014), Pa. Ranjith had narrated a script to Vikram and planned to team up for the film but was delayed, due to their commitments on multiple films. The project then materialized in September 2021 with K. E. Gnanavel Raja's production house Studio Green funding it, with Ranjith's banner Neelam Productions. An official announcement regarding the project was made by the production house on 2 December, with the film being tentatively titled as Chiyaan 61, referring to Vikram's 61st film as a lead actor. In a media interaction in May 2022, Ranjith stated that the film will be set in the backdrop of the Kolar Gold Fields in Karnataka, and that being a historical drama about working-class miners who discovered gold in the 19th century. The official title Thangalaan was announced on the eve of Diwali, 23 October.

=== Pre-production ===
"Ranjith fictionalises pieces of history to give agency to Dalits. Instead of showing Dalit people as those who went to KGF because they were dirt poor, without food and water, and presenting an account where the film sympathises with their sorry plight, Ranjith wants to show us that Dalits lived a dignified life and that they struggled to sustain and reclaim it."

— — Tamizh Prabha

Ranjith drafted the script after the release of Kaala (2018), describing it as his dream project. However, he halted working on the script after watching a trailer for the Kannada film KGF: Chapter 1 and sought to rewrite it to avoid similarities. He then gave the first draft of the script to Tamizh Prabha in early 2022, who admitted the metaphorical elements in the storytelling. Prabha then acquainted various resources to familiarize on the script, which included the documentary novel Living Dangerously by Fanny Emily Penny, and numerous fictional books on Tamil folklore. Besides that, he also visited the Kolar Gold Fields to understand the landscape and the people, where he gathered information from the remaining descendants of those who worked in the gold fields. Azhagiya Periyavan also co-wrote the screenplay with Prabha and Ranjith, as well as writing the dialogues.

G. V. Prakash Kumar was assigned as the film's music composer, dismissing initial reports stated that Anirudh Ravichander would score music for the film. A. Kishor Kumar handled the cinematography, after previously working with Ranjith on Natchathiram Nagargiradhu (2022) and planned to shoot the film in 3D formats, instead of traditional 2D to 3D conversion. Editor Selva R. K., production designer S. S. Moorthy, stunt choreographer Sunner Sam and costume designers Aegan Ekambaram and Anitha Sundaresan were recruited as a part of the technical crew. Sivakumar and Sanjay Rupesh were appointed as the production controller and executive producer, respectively.

=== Casting ===
In July 2022, Radhika Apte and Rashmika Mandanna were signed in to play the female lead roles, but was replaced by Parvathy Thiruvothu and Malavika Mohanan respectively, due to scheduling conflicts. Malavika described her character Aarathi as one of her intense and physically challenging roles; to prepare for the character, she learned Silambam as well as following a stringent diet plan. As a part of her preparations for the character, Ranjith made Malavika watch the American films The Woman King (2022) "to observe the physicality, power and the effortlessness within the power, of the women in the film". Ranjith took the character's inspiration from a local deity, who was considered to be the protector of the Kolar Gold Fields, which Malavika added "The story that whoever has gone there hasn't come back because of this witch-like figure was probably meant to scare greedy people off the gold mines."

In October 2022, Pasupathy was cast in a supporting role collaborating with Vikram after Dhool (2003), Arul (2004), Majaa (2005) and 10 Endrathukulla (2015) and Ranjith after Sarpatta Parambarai (2021). English actor Daniel Caltagirone was cast as Clement, ex-army officer who visits the gold fields to discover gold. Caltagirone further attributed that his character would be different from other white characters which were portrayed in a stereotypical manner. He added "I spoke to Ranjith, and he explained how these stories are India-centric and the idea was to bring in an English actor to portray a British colonialist. There might have been some great performances by British actors in earlier such films, but what Ranjith has done with my role is something quite different."

=== Filming ===
Principal photography commenced for the film on 12 October 2022 in Chennai, with test shoots being conducted and preliminary portions being shot there for three days. The team then moved to Kadapa for a minor schedule which went on for a week. In late-October, the team moved to Madurai, where an action sequence with Malavika and Vikram being shot. After a month-long filming, the team then moved to Hogenakkal Falls in early December for shooting few portions. The same month, Ranjith shoot few sequences at Maldives with Malavika participating. A week later, Vikram and Ranjith began commencing few portions at the Kolar Gold Fields where he interacted with his fans; a video of the same surfaced on social media.

Filming for the second schedule commenced at a film city in Chennai on 5 January 2023, where all the principal character's portions were filmed in this schedule, with the exception of Malavika's, who joined the shoot in February. The month-long schedule ended in mid-February, and subsequently filming for the third schedule began at the Kolar Gold Fields that continued for six weeks. Caltagirone started shooting for his portions the same month, with other principal characters. By March 2023, only fifteen days of the shoot were left for the film, with ten days in Chennai and five days in Madurai. The third schedule was completed on 7 April, with the team taking a month-long break as Vikram was attending the promotions of Ponniyin Selvan: II (2023).

The final schedule began on 2 May 2023. During the schedule, Vikram suffered a rib injury while rehearsing for the role, that resulted in the shooting being temporarily halted. He was advised to take a month-long rest for recovery, ultimately delaying the production. Filming resumed on 12 June, with Vikram, Malavika, Parvathy and other supporting cast members participating. Filming wrapped on 5 July, with the completion of the schedule. Reshoots for the film conducted on late December, after Ranjith felt unsatisfied with few portions. Ranjith, in a media interaction, claimed that most of the supporting cast had returned to other projects, except Vikram, who had cooperated for the reshoot. The film was shot within 120 working days.

=== Post-production ===
Anthony BJ Ruban, who worked in all of Ranjith's films, handled the sound design. On 21 November, Malavika began dubbing for her portions in the film and was completed within 10 days. Vikram completed dubbing for his portions on December. Hybrid360 handled the visual effects, under the supervision of R. Senthil Kumar. Prakash commenced working on the film's background score on mid-April 2024. It was completed on 1 July 2024. The film was sent to Central Board of Film Certification (CBFC) on 26 July, where the film was given U/A certificate without any cuts and the final duration of 156 minutes. (Note: In comparison, The Times of India reported 155 minutes.) The final sound mixing works were completed on 13 August, two days before the film's release.

== Music ==
The music and background score is composed by G. V. Prakash Kumar, in his maiden collaboration with Ranjith; third with Vikram after Deiva Thirumagal (2011) and Thaandavam (2012). The album featured five songs, with two singles "Minikki Minikki" and "Thangalaan War Song" released on 17 July and 2 August, respectively. The album was released under the Junglee Music label on 11 August.

== Marketing ==
On the occasion of Vikram's birthday (17 April 2023), the makers released an exclusive behind-the-scenes video of the film. The film's official teaser was launched on 1 November at a special event held at Sathyam Cinemas in Chennai, with the cast and crew in attendance. The Telugu version's teaser was launched at AMB Cinemas in Hyderabad. The film's trailer was released on 10 July 2024.

Pre-release events were conducted in Hyderabad, Chennai and Bangalore from 4–6 August. Promotional events for the film was initially intended to commence in Kochi on 1 August, but was cancelled out of respect for the victims of the 2024 Wayanad landslides. Kerala distributor Gokulam Gopalan further added that the expenses for the promotional programs will be given to the Kerala Chief Minister's Distress Relief Fund (CMDRF).

== Release ==
=== Theatrical ===
Thangalaan was released in theatres on 15 August 2024 in standard, 3D and EPIQ format, coinciding with India's Independence Day. It was initially scheduled to theatrically release on 26 January 2024 coinciding with Republic Day. In mid-December 2023, it was reported that the release was postponed from that date, as the makers wanted to first screen it in film festivals and release worldwide later. On 15 January 2024, the occasion of Pongal, the producers released a poster announcing a tentative release during April 2024. However, the film's release was postponed again. The film was cleared by the censor board with a U/A certificate without any major cuts; expletives were muted and scenes of gore were colour corrected. The Hindi version was released on 6 September 2024 and emerged as a sleeper hit.

It was featured in the Limelight section of the 54th International Film Festival Rotterdam to be screened in February 2025.

=== Distribution ===
The Telugu theatrical rights in Nizam were acquired by Mythri Movie Makers. The film was released in Tamil, Hindi, Telugu, Kannada and Malayalam by KVN Productions in Karnataka. The Malayalam theatrical rights were sold to Sree Gokulam Movies through Dream Big Films.

=== Home media ===
The digital streaming rights for the film were purchased by Netflix for ₹35 crore. The film was scheduled to premiere on Netflix from 20 September 2024, but was delayed. Eventually, the film began streaming on Netflix in Hindi, Tamil, Telugu, Malayalam and Kannada from 10 December 2024.

== Reception ==
=== Critical response ===
Thangalaan received mixed reviews from critics, who praised the lead cast's performance (especially Vikram, Parvathy Thiruvothu, and Daniel Caltagirone), and GV Prakash Kumar's background score, but criticized the historical inaccuracies, visual effects, screenplay and writing.

M Suganth of The Times of India gave 4/5 stars and wrote "The film is a true-blue big-screen experience that immerses us into its world and keeps us glued with arresting visuals and intense drama." Rohit Panikker of Times Now gave 4/5 and wrote "Thangalaan is a well-thought-of and well-produced experience in both visual and cerebral storytelling. What this film has managed to do is prove that magical realism and period dramas can work as well as any mass masala flick as long as the story is delivered with conviction. All in all, a definite theatre watch to feel the full effect of what the film's team has put together." Avinash Ravichandran of The Indian Express gave 3/5 stars and wrote "Some of his [Ranjith] audacious attempts at storytelling in Thangalaan get overburdened by the novelty factor. He isn't always ably supported by the technicalities of the film that keep us at an arm's length at times."

Gopinath Rajendran of The Hindu wrote "The impressive performances and memorable sequences stand apart like gold nuggets in a muddled sieve in Vikram and Pa Ranjith's intriguing yet incoherent Thangalaan." Sudhir Srinivasan of The New Indian Express gave 3/5 stars and wrote that although "not sparkly", Thangalaan was gold for its experimental story, clever craft and striking climax. Janani K of India Today gave 2/5 stars and wrote "However, Thangalaan seems to be the weakest work in director Pa Ranjith's filmography. The film's screenplay is too abstract, which might not be everyone's cup of tea." Latha Srinivasan of Hindustan Times wrote "Vikram has outdone himself in this film as Thangalaan and shows us how talented and committed he is, yet again. Whether it the emotional scenes or the action ones, Vikram makes you feel every emotion he goes through."

== Future ==
A sequel was announced on 17 August 2024, which was tentatively titled as Thangalaan 2 with Ranjith returning to the direction and Vikram reprising his role as Thangalaan Muni.
