= K. S. Venkitachalam =

Indian translator

- Born: Kavasserry Sheshayyar Venkitachalam; Kozhikode District, Kerala
- Occupations: Translator, literary critic
- Writing career
- Notable awards: Sahitya Akademi Translation Prize (2017)

Kavasserry Sheshayyar Venkitachalam is a translator and literary critic from Kerala, India. He has translated 26 books from Tamil and 5 books from English into Malayalam. He has also written reviews for about two hundred books. He received many awards including Sahitya Akademi Translation Prize by Sahitya Akademi Government of India.

== Biography ==
Kavasserry Sheshayyar Venkitachalam was born into a Tamil Brahmin family that has lived in Kozhikode for three generations. Although born in the Kozhikode district of Kerala, Venkadachalam's mother tongue is Tamil, which helps him translate the Tamil original text into Malayalam without losing the essence.

Venkitachalam was an deputy manager at the State Bank of India. He took voluntary retirement from State Bank in 2001 to focus on writing. He was a member of the Sahitya Akademi Translation Prize selection committee in 2019.

Venkitachalam, who is single, now lives in Karaparamba in Kozhikode Corporation.

== Literary contributions ==
Venkitachalam has translated 26 books from Tamil and 5 books from English into Malayalam. When he read the novel in poetic form written by Irayanb, he felt the need to translate its linguistic beauty into Malayalam. Thus, he translated and published it under the title Neerchalile Meenukal. The very next year, Jayakanthan's Hara Hara Shankara was also translated and published. It was only after these two works received attention that he began to pay more attention to the field of translation.

His translated works include Kamba Ramayanam, Prathapamuthaliyar Charithram (The history of Prathapamuthaliyar), the first novel in Tamil, Kallikkat Ithihasam by Vairamuthu, Tamil women's stories edited by A. Vennila, Jayakanthan's Agraharamthile Poochha, Haraharashankara, Oh.. America, Mulankattile Nilavu, Oru Veettil Sambhavikkunnath, Oru Kavita Niyam Tettuinku, Azhagiya Periyavan's Meenakshi and Neerottam, Perumal Murugan's short stories, Shehnaaz Hussain's Ente Ammayude Prachodanathmaka Jeevitham, Kamal Haasan's Vishwaroopam script, My Geeta by Devdutt Pattanaik, Aaraanu Njaan of Ramana Maharshi, Upa Pandavam by S. Ramakrishnan and My judgments in the light of Ambedkar by Justice K. Chandru.

Venkitachalam, also known as a critic, has written reviews for about two hundred books.

Apart from translations and critics, he has written about 25 short stories in Malayalam, although none of them have been published.

== Awards and honors ==
- Sahitya Akademi Translation Prize for the year 2017 for Malayalam for translating Jnanpith winner Jayakanthan's Tamil short story collection Agraharathile Poochha into Malayalam.
- Tamil Nadu Nalli Chinnaswamy-Thessai Ettum Award for Translation (2017)
