= Jailer 2 =

2026 Indian film by Nelson Dilipkumar

- Theatrical release poster
- Directed by: Nelson Dilipkumar
- Written by: Nelson Dilipkumar
- Produced by: Kalanithi Maran
- Starring: Rajinikanth; S. J. Suryah; Mithun Chakraborty; Suraj Venjaramoodu; Ramya Krishnan; Vidya Balan; Meghana Raj
- Cinematography: Vijay Kartik Kannan
- Edited by: R. Nirmal
- Music by: Anirudh Ravichander
- Production company: Sun Pictures
- Distributed by: see below
- Release date: 15 October 2026
- Running time: 165 minutes
- Country: India
- Language: Tamil
- Budget: ₹250–350 crore
- Box office: ₹835 crore

Jailer 2 is a 2026 Indian Tamil-language action comedy film written and directed by Nelson Dilipkumar. It was produced by Kalanithi Maran through Sun Pictures. A sequel to Jailer (2023), the film stars Rajinikanth, Ramya Krishnan, Yogi Babu, Mirnaa and Rithvik reprising their roles from the predecessor, with S. J. Suryah, Mithun Chakraborty, Suraj Venjaramoodu, Vidya Balan and Meghana Raj joining the cast. Set three months after Jailer, the sequel revolves around the title character seeking to dismantle the larger hierarchy of an idol-smuggling network he earlier dismantled.

Prior to the release of the original film in 2023, Nelson expressed interest in making sequels to his films. Sun Pictures announced the sequel to Jailer in January 2025. Principal photography commenced that March in Chennai and took place across several locations in India, including Kerala, Coimbatore, Mysore and Goa, before concluding in April 2026. The film has music composed by Anirudh Ravichander, cinematography by Vijay Kartik Kannan and editing by R. Nirmal.

Jailer 2 was released worldwide on 15 October 2026 in standard and IMAX formats. The film received generally positive reviews from critics and was a box-office success. It is the third highest-grossing Indian film of 2026, the highest-grossing Tamil film of 2026, and the highest-grossing Tamil film of all time.

== Plot ==
Three months after dismantling the idol statue thief Varman's smuggling operations and killing his own son Arjun, (Note: As depicted in Jailer (2023).) retired jailer Muthuvel Pandian lives a secluded life with his wife Viji, daughter-in-law Swetha and grandson Rithvik near Anaikatti, Coimbatore, working as a supermarket supervisor. His family remains unaware that he killed Arjun. Varman's close friend and associate, Dileep, another idol statue thief, hires an investigator named Mukund to identify Varman's killer.

Muthuvel is manipulated by self-proclaimed gangster and fruit seller Moorthi, into becoming his driver. He encounters a former ally Vimal, who has since become involved in statue smuggling. Recognising an opportunity to infiltrate Dileep's operations, Muthuvel secretly arranges for Moorthi to establish contact with Dileep through Vimal while maintaining his identity as an ordinary driver. However, Mukund's investigation eventually leads to Muthuvel's identification after his image is captured during the filming of a musical sequence for actor Blast Mohan's upcoming film.

Dileep corners Muthuvel at a facility while his henchmen reach Muthuvel's family home. However, Muthuvel reveals that he anticipated the attack and had planted several infiltrators within Dileep's organisation, who eliminate his men. Muthuvel's family is rescued by his allies Mathew, Narasimha and Kamdev. Muthuvel then strikes a deal with Dileep and his associate Ameer to eliminate Bodhi Kalpak, the leader of the larger idol-smuggling network who oversees the organisation alongside his father Chakri and siblings Kantha, Ved and Sharva.

Dileep attempts to assassinate Bodhi, but Ameer betrays and kills Dileep instead out of loyalty to the Kalpak family, assuming Dileep's position in the organisation. In retaliation, Bodhi orders an attack on Narasimha, leaving him critically injured, while his wife and son are abducted and taken to the Kalpaks' estate in Goa, the base of their smuggling operations.

Bodhi meets Muthuvel to demand the return of three containers with statues that Muthuvel and Mathew had intercepted during Varman's previous operations. Muthuvel agrees and arranges to deliver the containers during Chakri's birthday celebration. However, he secretly rigs them with explosives and detonates them during the party, using the ensuing chaos to capture Chakri. Muthuvel releases Chakri in exchange for Narasimha's family in a compromise. Despite the agreement, Bodhi sends assassins after Muthuvel. Having planted a tracker on Chakri, Muthuvel anticipates the attack and lures the assassins into a building to be exploded.

Bodhi later captures Muthuvel's ally Dokinath. Drugged with truth serum, Dokinath reveals that Muthuvel had killed Arjun. Bodhi reveals this to Muthuvel's family. Devastated, Viji reports Muthuvel to the police on a false charge of holding the family hostage, resulting in his arrest. However, Bodhi abducts Muthuvel's family, threatening to kill them unless he surrenders the remaining containers.

From prison, Muthuvel seeks assistance from Roddy, another reformed criminal and former associate, who orchestrates his escape and deploys his assassins to rescue Muthuvel's family. Kantha reveals to the family that Arjun was killed due to his immorality but Muthuvel concealed this to preserve Arjun's honorable image, which restores the family's faith in Muthuvel. He launches a final assault against the Kalpaks, killing Ved and Sharva. Chakri unsuccessfully attempts to kill Muthuvel in a suicide bombing resulting in his own death, and Kantha is severely injured. Bodhi attempts to flee aboard an aircraft, but Muthuvel, with the assistance of Mathew, Narasimha and Kamdev, shoots it down, killing him onboard and ending the organisation.

Two weeks later, Muthuvel surrenders to the police for Arjun's murder despite Viji having forgiven him. As he enters the police car, a policeman hands him a phone showing a new text message from Kantha. He orders Muthuvel to reply to the message or face Kantha's wrath.

== Cast ==
- Rajinikanth as "Tiger" Muthuvel Pandian IPS, a retired jailer
- S. J. Suryah as Bodhi Kalpak
- Mithun Chakraborty as Chakri Kalpak, Bodhi's father
- Suraj Venjaramoodu as Dileep
- Ramya Krishnan as Vijaya "Viji" Pandian, Muthuvel Pandian's wife
- Vidya Balan as Kantha Kalpak, Bodhi's sister
- Meghana Raj as Revathi, Narasimha's wife
- Yogi Babu as Vimal, a taxi driver
- Mirnaa as Swetha Pandian, Muthuvel's daughter-in-law
- Rithvik as Rithvik "Rithu" Pandian, Muthuvel's grandson
- Jatin Sarna as Ved Kalpak, Bodhi's brother
- Hakim Shahjahan as Sharva Kalpak, Bodhi's brother
- Anna Rajan as Dileep's wife
- Namo Narayana as Moorthy
- Bagavathi Perumal as Bhaskar
- Kottayam Nazeer as Ameer
- Sunil Sukhada as Benjamin
- Sujith Shankar as Mukund
- Bjorn Surrao as Kohli
- Jaffer Sadiq as Dokinath, Narasimha and Muthuvel's henchman
- Padam Kumar as Raja Rao
- Sheela Rajkumar as Chidambaram's daughter
- P. L. Thenappan as Rtd. Inspector Chidambaram
- Shyam Krishnan as Freddy, Bodhi's assistant
- Rajesh Sharma as Inspector Vikram Deshpande
- Bani J as Roddy's henchwoman
- Apeksha Porwal as Roddy's henchwoman
- Edin Rose as Roddy's henchwoman
- Ramachandran Durairaj as Durai
- Tamizh as Kumar
- Saravana Vel as Moorthi's henchman
- Noble K. James as Jinju, Dileep's brother-in-law
- Sutheesh as Dileep's henchman
- Vinay Varma as Goan police officer
- Saravana Subbiah as S. Sathyamoorthy
- Sai Vignesh as Raghu
- Seeni Ammal

Cameo appearances

- Mohanlal as Mathew
- Shiva Rajkumar as Narasimha
- Hrithik Roshan as Roddy
- Jackie Shroff as Kamdev
- Vijay Sethupathi as a police officer and Kantha's ally
- Vinayakan as Varman, an eccentric idol smuggler (dream appearance)
- Vasanth Ravi as ACP Arjun Pandian IPS, Muthuvel's son (posthumous and analepsis appearance)
- Poorna as a dancer in the song "Ala Bolelo"
- Rajesh Madhavan as a singer in the song "Ala Bolelo"
- Nora Fatehi as a dancer in the song "Bindaas"
- Harshad as Dhanraj, Varman's friend and sidekick
- Tamannaah Bhatia as Kamna (Archival footage of the song "Kaavaalaa")

Members of the Masaka Kids Africana appear in the song "Bindaas".

== Production ==
=== Development ===
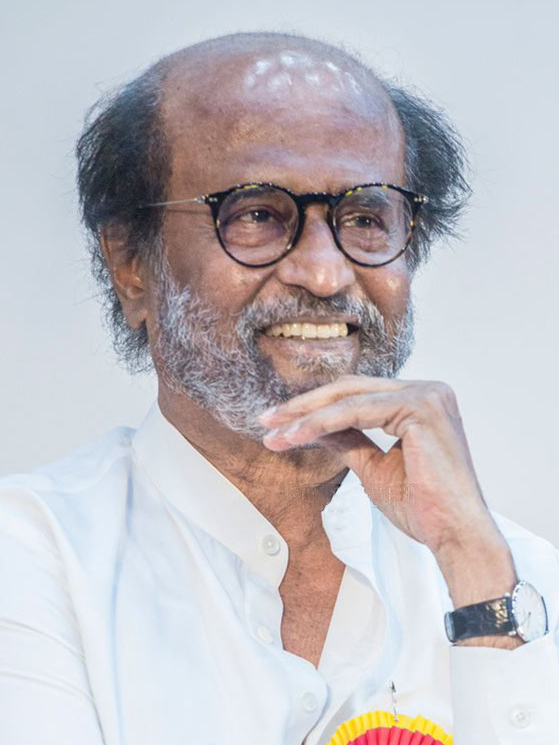
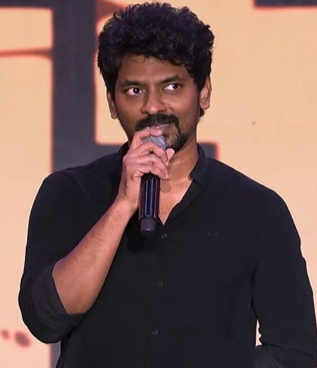
Rajinikanth and Nelson Dilipkumar returned to the sequel.

After Jailer was a success, people involved spoke about doing a sequel. Nelson Dilipkumar had previously spoken about making sequels to some of his films, prompting speculation about a follow-up to Jailer. By January 2024, Nelson had begun working on the sequel's script. Actress Mirnaa, who appeared in the first film, confirmed in February 2024 that Nelson was working on the script and that the project was progressing toward production. In March, however, Nelson said he was uncertain that Jailer 2 would be his immediate next project, meaning that the sequel was still in development rather than formally greenlit at that stage. By April, reports said that the first draft had been completed and that Nelson was preparing to move into pre-production. Reportedly, the concept had received approval from Rajinikanth and Sun Pictures.

The project was initially reported under the working title Hukum, after the song of the same name from Jailer. The sequel was revealed on 14 January 2025, coinciding with Pongal. Sun Pictures released an announcement teaser featuring Rajinikanth, Nelson and Anirudh Ravichander and titled the film Jailer 2. The film was produced by Kalanithi Maran under Sun Pictures. Anirudh Ravichander returned as composer, in his fifth consecutive film with Nelson. Vijay Kartik Kannan, R. Nirmal and D. R. K. Kiran returned as cinematographer, editor and art director, respectively. Chethan D'Souza joined as action choreographer.

=== Pre-production ===
Reports initially indicated that production was intended to begin in late 2024, with a 2025 release considered in connection with Rajinikanth's 50th year in cinema. The start was pushed back, and filming commenced in March 2025.

The filmmakers also produced the announcement teaser before principal photography. The technical crew largely reunited from Jailer. Vijay Kartik Kannan returned as cinematographer, R. Nirmal as editor and D. R. K. Kiran as art director, while Anirudh returned to compose the music. Visual effects supervisor Yugandhar T. also joined the technical crew. Chethan D'Souza was hired as the stunt director after Nelson was impressed by his work in Aavesham (2024), which blended humor and action while keeping character traits intact. Sharing a similar approach to stunts, Nelson brought him on for the film's first promotional video before attaching him as the film's sole stunt director.

The film was taken into production on 10 March 2025, with Sun Pictures announcing that the shoot had begun in Chennai. The eventual production was designed around an extensive schedule across several parts of India rather than being confined to Chennai. Reported and documented locations included Chennai, Attapadi, Coimbatore, Kozhikode, Mysore, Palakkad, Goa and Kochi.

=== Casting ===
Rajinikanth reprises his role as "Tiger" Muthuvel Pandian. Yogi Babu was among the first returning cast members to confirm his involvement, doing so in July 2024. Nelson reportedly prioritised writing comic subplots between Babu and Rajinikanth during the pre-production. Ramya Krishnan and Mirnaa returned as members of Muthuvel Pandian's family, while S. J. Suryah joined the cast in a pivotal role during the second schedule. Shiva Rajkumar confirmed that he would reprise his role from Jailer, while Mohanlal also returned. Anna Rajan confirmed her involvement in May 2025, and Suraj Venjaramoodu did so in December. Jatin Sarna joined the production in August 2025 and was confirmed to play a major antagonist.

Vinayakan confirmed in December 2025 that he would return despite his character, Varman, being killed in Jailer. The circumstances of his character's return were not disclosed. In the same month, Nora Fatehi was confirmed to appear in an item number, later titled "Bindaas". Vijay Sethupathi confirmed in January 2026 that he would make a cameo appearance. Sarna's February 2026 social media post also provided confirmation of the involvement of Vidya Balan and Mithun Chakraborty, with photographs showing the three actors with Nelson. The production was also confirmed to include Bagavathi Perumal, Thamizh, Meghana Raj and Bjorn Surrao. Poorna and Rajesh Madhavan appeared in the film's "Ala Bolelo" song, alongside Rajinikanth. Sujith Shankar, Kottayam Nazeer, Sunil Sukhada and Vineeth Thattil David would reportedly play significant roles in the film, after being present in the Kerala schedule. Chakraborty would reunite with Rajinikanth after 30 years, following Rajinikanth's only Bengali film Bhagya Debata (1995). For Vidya, the film would mark her full-fledged debut in Tamil cinema, after she previously made a cameo appearance in Nerkonda Paarvai (2019).

Shah Rukh Khan was reportedly approached for a cameo in the film, but declined due to his commitments to King. Later, Hrithik Roshan was confirmed for a special appearance, reuniting him with Rajinikanth 40 years after Bhagwaan Dada (1986), as well as his debut in Tamil cinema.

=== Filming ===
Principal photography began on 10 March 2025 in Chennai. The initial portions of the first schedule were reported to focus on Rajinikanth, with filming taking place at locations including Sathyam Cinemas in Royapettah. A large village set was also reportedly constructed at Adityaram Studios for the production. The second schedule began in Attappadi, Kerala, on 11 April, with Ramya Krishnan, Mirnaa and S. J. Suryah joining the production. The team filmed for approximately 20 days around the Tamil Nadu—Kerala border before moving briefly to Coimbatore. A subsequent schedule began in Kozhikode in May 2025. The production filmed in the Cheruvannur Nallalam area, with Rajinikanth joining the schedule after it had begun. After completing his portions, Rajinikanth returned to Chennai later that month. At the time, he said that he expected filming to continue until around December.

In June, production moved to Mysore, where sequences featuring Rajinikanth were filmed at a specially constructed set in Bilikere near Hunsur. The production returned to Chennai for another schedule in July. During this period, Mohanlal was reported to have joined the production to film his portions. After Rajinikanth's commitments to Coolie (2025), filming resumed in Palakkad, Kerala, on 8 September. Shiva Rajkumar joined the schedule to film his portions. The schedule concluded later that month. The production then conducted a short schedule in Chennai before moving to Goa in late October. Rajinikanth arrived in Goa on 29 October, and the schedule concluded in early November. Cinema Express reported that the schedule contained major action-heavy sequences considered important to the film's storyline.

By 27 November, Rajinikanth said that the film was progressing well but some portions remained to be filmed. The final major schedule began in Kerala in January 2026. Rajinikanth arrived in Kochi on 20 January to complete his remaining portions. At that stage, Cinema Express reported that the production was entering its final schedule. Rajinikanth confirmed in April that principal photography had been completed and that the film had entered its finishing stage. The production announced the wrap on 21 April. On 14 May, a 28-year-old crew member died after suffering an electric shock while carrying out electrical work at a shooting location in Chennai's East Coast Road. Filming was called off following the incident while police investigated. In late August, Rajinikanth revealed that overall filming was complete.

=== Post-production ===
By February 2026, the film had reportedly entered post-production following the completion of some actors' portions, while the remaining production continued. By September, reports of possible reshoots and a postponement had circulated. Sun Pictures reaffirmed the 15 October release date.

== Music ==
The soundtrack and film score were composed by Anirudh Ravichander, marking his fifth collaboration with Nelson and sixth with Rajinikanth. "Hukum Reloaded" was the track featured in the announcement teaser released on 14 January 2025. The instrumental track "One Name" was released separately on 3 July 2026.

"Ala Bolelo", marketed as the first single, was released on 21 August 2026. The second single "One Sun One Moon" was released on 25 September 2026. The full version of the song "One Name" was released as the third single on 29 September 2026. The fourth single, titled "Bindaas", was released on 30 September 2026. The full album was released at a private event titled Jailer 2 Rave, held on the same day at Chennai Trade Centre in Nandambakkam.

== Marketing ==
The film's announcement teaser was screened in major single-screen theatres and multiplexes across Tamil Nadu, Kerala, Karnataka and parts of North India, in conjunction with its release on YouTube on 14 January 2025, coinciding with Pongal. A behind-the-scenes video was released shortly thereafter, disproving rumours that Rajinikanth used a body double for the action sequences of the teaser. The film's release date was revealed via an announcement teaser on 2 July 2026. The character reveal campaign began on 18 September 2026. The official trailer was released on 5 October 2026, which amassed over 6 million views in 5 hours, though it also drew comparisons with characters from the Breaking Bad franchise. Interviews with various cast and crew members, including Rajinikanth, premiered as Jailer 2 Super Show on Sun NXT from 9 October 2026.

== Release ==
=== Theatrical ===
Jailer 2 was released worldwide on 15 October 2026, in standard and IMAX formats. It was also released in 4DX, EPIQ, Dolby Vision and D-Box formats, with Sun Pictures claiming Jailer 2 to be the first Indian film released in seven premium formats. In September 2025, Rajinikanth announced that the film would be released on 12 June 2026; however, the date was not met. In April 2026, clips of Jailer 2 were leaked online and started circulating on social media. Sun Pictures issued a statement stating that their anti-piracy team was working towards removing the leaked content online and taking action against social media accounts sharing or promoting them. The Hindi-dubbed version was not released in multiplexes across North India due to a dispute between multiplex chains and the filmmakers over the four-week theatrical window before its streaming debut. It was released only in a limited number of single-screen theatres across North India.

=== Distribution ===
The Tamil Nadu theatrical rights were acquired by Red Giant Movies. The theatrical rights for Andhra Pradesh and Telangana were acquired by Sithara Entertainments for ₹45 crore. Gokulam Gopalan's Sree Gokulam Movies acquired the distribution rights for Kerala and Karnataka for ₹30 crore. They later sold the Karnataka rights to K Manju Cinemas and Bangalore Kumar Films. Pen Marudhar acquired the distribution rights for North India for ₹15 crore. The Malaysia distribution rights were acquired by Malik Streams Corporation. Shloka Entertainments acquired the overseas distribution rights across North America, Europe, Africa, United Kingdom, Sri Lanka and Nepal. They later sold the rights to Prathyangira Cinemas for Canada, Ahimsa Entertainments and Boleyn Cinema for the United Kingdom, and Narasimhika Cinemas for other European nations. Phars Film distributed the film across GCC nations. XGen Studio distributed the film in Singapore. Dream Screens International distributed the film across Oceania, and Spacebox Films distributed the film in Japan, Thailand, Indonesia, Philippines, Hong Kong and Cambodia.

=== Home media ===
The film's post-theatrical streaming rights were reportedly acquired by Amazon Prime Video for ₹160 crore. The film began streaming on the platform from 12 November 2026 in Tamil and dubbed versions of Telugu, Hindi, Malayalam and Kannada languages.

== Reception ==
=== Critical response ===
Jailer 2 received mostly positive reviews from critics.

Latha Srinivasan of NDTV gave 3.5/5 stars and wrote "The sequel to Jailer is a solid commercial entertainer thanks to Superstar Rajinikanth. There's humour, action, music and a star who continues to command the frame, though the writing occasionally loses its way especially in the second half." Manivasagan Namasivayam of DT Next gave 3.5/5 stars and wrote "On the whole, Jailer 2 is a complete mass entertainer and a feast for Superstar fans. Despite some pacing issues in the second half, Nelson's trademark dark humour, the large ensemble cast and Rajinikanth's effortless screen presence keep the film engaging." Neeshita Nyayapati of Hindustan Times gave 3/5 stars and wrote "Nelson Dilipkumar and Rajinikanth's sequel to their 2023 hit might have just pulled off the impossible by being engaging."

M. Suganth of The Times of India gave 3/5 stars and wrote "Jailer 2 has many of the elements that were part of the original – the glasses, tying of shoelaces, the video calls, the tissue boxes, the snipers, the cameos – but what works in its favour is that rather a retread, it feels like a continuation of the story." Janani K of India Today gave 3/5 stars and wrote "With ample elevation scenes and Rajinikanth doing what he does best, Jailer 2 offers a memorable theatrical experience." Titas Chowdhury of News18 gave 3/5 stars and wrote, "Ultimately, Jailer 2 delivers in patches but falls short of its predecessor's impact. This is an out-and-out fan-service film that may not work for everyone."

Sreeju Sudhakaran of Rediff.com gave 3/5 stars and wrote "Jailer 2 delivers an enjoyable fanboy experience with Rajinikanth's unparalleled aura and thrilling elevation scenes, yet struggles to provide a compelling narrative beyond superstar celebration." Rohit Panikker of Filmfare gave 3/5 stars and wrote "Rajinikanth's charisma, Nelson's dark humour and engaging action make Jailer 2 entertaining, even as an overcrowded screenplay holds it back." Reviewing the Hindi version, Bollywood Hungama gave 3/5 stars and wrote "Rajini: The Jailer 2 is a paisa vasool mass entertainer packed with Rajinikanth's trademark moments, punchy dialogues and surprise cameos." Simon Abrams of RogerEbert.com gave 2.5/4 stars and wrote "[…] There’s still too much of everything here, but there’s also just enough highlights and infectious, star-powered swagger to keep you floating from one islet of pandering maximalist pleasure to the next."

Bhuvanesh Chandar of The Hindu wrote, "Nelson betters the 'Jailer' template with a well-calibrated sequel that knows when to let Rajini loose and fills the in-between stretches with riotous humour and narrative build-up." Nikita Toppo of WION wrote "If you are planning to watch the film, go for the superstar's style and screen presence, as there are several moments for audiences to cheer for. However, Jailer 2 may not recreate the impact of the 2023 original." Anandu Suresh of The Indian Express gave 2.5/5 stars and wrote "Rajinikanth brings unmatchable style and aura to Nelson's sequel, but weak writing and flat humour keep it from matching the original's spark."

Sajin Shrijith of The Week gave 2.5/5 stars and wrote "Despite featuring a strong comedic first half and stellar performances, the Rajinikanth movie struggles with repetitive tropes and underwhelming cameos, not to mention underutilised new additions." BVS Prakash of Deccan Chronicle gave 2/5 stars and wrote "Rajinikanth is left to shoulder much of the film, relying on his trademark charisma and screen presence to keep audiences engaged." The film was also reviewed by The Hollywood Reporter India, Deccan Herald, Tamil Guardian, and The Tribune.

=== Box office ===
After earning ₹85 crore (US$9.1 million) on its second day, the film surged on its third day, grossing ₹110 crore (US$12 million). Its estimated seven-day total collection stood at ₹549 crore (US$59 million). Having concluded it's theatrical run with ₹835 crore (US$89 million)worldwide, the film failed to reach the 1000 crore benchmark, which commentators attributed to various factors, including the pre-release fallout between North Indian multiplex chains and the filmmakers which led to the film only having a limited release in North Indian cinemas.

=== Social media criticism ===
Following the film's release, widespread criticism arose in social media, regarding the drastically reduced screentime of Mohanlal and his scenes in the film by the actor's fans and supporters. Mohanlal's costume designer, Jishad Shamsudeen, said in his Instagram account that he had a total screentime of over five minutes, but was reduced to less than a minute. Apart from Mohanlal's screentime, other criticisms included the reduced screentime of Shiva Rajkumar and the deleted scenes of Vijay Sethupathi and Santhanam.
