= 54321 (film) =

2016 Indian film by Ragavendra Prasad

- Film poster
- Directed by: Ragavendra Prasad
- Written by: Ragavendra Prasad
- Produced by: G. V. Kannan
- Starring: Shabeer Kallarakkal; Aarvin; Pavithra
- Cinematography: Banu Murugan
- Edited by: M.R. Rejeesh
- Music by: Joshua Sridhar
- Production company: MainStream Productions
- Release date: 26 August 2016
- Running time: 120 minutes
- Country: India
- Language: Tamil

54321 is a 2016 Indian Tamil language psychological thriller film written and directed by Ragavendra Prasad in his directorial debut. The film features Shabeer Kallarakkal, Aarvin and Pavithra in lead roles, with Rohini, Jayakumar, and Ravi Raghavendra playing supporting roles.

== Plot ==
The story revolves around five interconnected lives, all tied together by life circumstances within a single house.

A burglar (Jayakumar) breaks into a residential property. While attempting to steal money and jewelry from the homeowners' safe, he unexpectedly stumbles upon a dangerous hostage situation already unfolding inside the house. When the homeowner, Vinoth (Aarvin G.R.), returns home, another intruder named Vikram (Shabeer Kallarakkal) knocks him unconscious. Vinoth later wakes up to find himself chained to the stairs. Vikram, the intruder, reveals his identity to Vinoth and confronts him coldly.

Through a series of sequential flashbacks, it is revealed that Vikram harbors intense hatred towards Vinoth dating back to their childhood. As former classmates and childhood rivals, Vikram developed an inferiority complex and a psychotic obsession with competing against Vinoth. Vikram's path eventually led to him committing matricide and being institutionalized. Now as an adult, Vikram seeks revenge against Vinoth out of jealous rage.

Returning to the present, it is disclosed that Anjali (Pavithra Gowda), Vinoth's wife and now Vikram's hostage, is bound to a chair with duct tape covering her mouth. Vikram threatens to harm Anjali unless Vinoth agrees to kill a child hidden somewhere in the house. Vikram is determined to prove that Vinoth is morally bankrupt like himself by forcing him to commit this act.

Despite Vinoth's pleas to spare his wife, Vikram mutilates Anjali by chopping off two of her fingers when Vinoth refuses to comply. Vikram also reveals that he is holding his own father (Ravi Raghavendra) hostage and threatens to kill him unless Vinoth obeys. Unable to bear harm to the hostages, Vinoth reluctantly moves towards the child.

In a tragic twist, Vikram reveals that the child he demanded Vinoth kill was actually his own son, disguised as a girl. Anjali knew the child's true identity but was unable to communicate it due to the tape over her mouth.

Ultimately, the burglar hiding in the house intervenes, leading to chaos. Vinoth's father also joins the fray, culminating in a final confrontation where Vinoth kills Vikram by stabbing him in the neck. As Vikram dies, he defiantly declares that he will inform his deceased mother that Vinoth is just as morally corrupt as he is. Unbeknownst to Vikram, Vinoth's son remains alive. With Vikram dead, authorities arrive at the scene, and Vinoth is reunited with his wife, finally safe.

== Cast ==
- Aarvin G.R. as Vinoth
- Shabeer Kallarakkal as Vikram
- Pavithra Gowda as Anjali
- Jayakumar as Thief
- Ravi Raghavendra as Vikram's father
- Rohini as Teacher
- Lakshmi as Vikram's mother
- Ravi Venkatraman as Jailer
- Pasanga Sivakumar as Jail Superintendent
- G. V. Kannan as Psychiatrist
- Aamir as 10-year-old Vikram
- Komagan as 10-year-old Vikram
- Yashwanth as Ashwin
- Antony as Sub-Jailer
- Lawrence as Thief's friend
- Suchithra Anandan as Thief's wife
- Moogambigai Ravi as Moneylender
- A. Manjunath as Kung Fu Master
- Anjali Devi as Anjali's mother
- S. Kannan as Priest
- Vijeesh as Vinoth's mother
- Viruchagakanth as Park Lover
- Saravanan as Jail Constable
- Rafiq as Psychiatric Hospital Patient
- Mathuranayagam as Jail Warden
- Theni M. Sankar as Chick Seller
- Neelen as Psychiatric Hospital Warden
- Nagaraj as Psychiatric Hospital Warden

== Production ==
Director Ragavendra Prasad revealed that the concept of 54321 came to him while working as an assistant director under Karthik Subbaraj in Pizza, and was inspired by the 2006 American-Mexican-French drama Babel. The title 54321 developed from the plot revolving around 5 people, their 4 lifestyles, the 3 murders within the plotline, the 2-hour film length, and the 1 revenge within the tale. Ragavendra Prasad said most of the film is set in real time. During July 2015, the filming was reported as then being in progress.

== Music ==
The music was composed by Joshua Sridhar. It was released under the label TrendMusic.

Track listing
No.	Title	Length
1.	Untitled	4:33
2.	Untitled	3:46
3.	Untitled	5:25
4.	Untitled	4:33
5.	Untitled	2:50

== Reception ==
M. Suganth of The Times of India opined that "And the film, too, never truly addresses the moral question at the heart of its plot — what makes one evil and is there difference between one evil act and another". Malini Mannath of The New Indian Express wrote that "54321 is opportunity lost!" The film was also reviewed by Hindustan Times, and Sowmya Rajendran for The News Minute.
