= King of Kotha =

2023 Indian Malayalam language film by Abhilash Joshiy

- Theatrical release poster
- Directed by: Abhilash Joshiy
- Written by: Abhilash N. Chandran
- Produced by: Dulquer Salmaan; Zee Studios
- Starring: Dulquer Salmaan; Shabeer Kallarakkal; Aishwarya Lakshmi; Prasanna; Gokul Suresh; Nyla Usha; Chemban Vinod Jose
- Narrated by: Mohanlal
- Cinematography: Nimish Ravi
- Edited by: Shyam Sasidharan
- Music by: Songs: Jakes Bejoy; Shaan Rahman; Score: Jakes Bejoy
- Production companies: Wayfarer Films; Zee Studios
- Distributed by: E4 Entertainment
- Release date: 24 August 2023
- Running time: 174 minutes
- Country: India
- Language: Malayalam
- Budget: ₹40 crore
- Box office: est. ₹38 crore

King of Kotha (also marketed as KOK) is a 2023 Indian Malayalam language period action drama film directed by Abhilash Joshiy (in his directorial debut). Jointly produced by Wayfarer Films and Zee Studios, the film stars Dulquer Salmaan in the titular role, with an ensemble cast of Shabeer Kallarakkal, Aishwarya Lekshmi, Prasanna, Gokul Suresh, Nyla Usha, Shammi Thilakan, Chemban Vinod Jose, Sajitha Madathil, Shanthi Krishna, Saran Shakthi and Anikha Surendran.

The principal photography began on 27 September 2022 at Karaikudi and was wrapped up on 21 February 2023. Filming also occurred in Rameswaram and Ramanathapuram. The cinematography and editing were handled by Nimish Ravi and Shyam Sasidharan, while the original score was composed by Jakes Bejoy while the songs were composed by Jakes Bejoy and Shaan Rahman.

King of Kotha was released worldwide on 24 August 2023 on Onam weekend to generally negative reviews from critics. King of Kotha had a strong opening at the worldwide box office grossing over ₹38.08 crore worldwide with a budget of ₹50 crore. The film underperformed at box office.

== Plot ==
1996: Police inspector Shahul Hassan is transferred to a fictional crime-infested town called Kotha, which is situated near the Kerala-Tamil Nadu border. Shahul enquires more about the town and learns that the citizens, especially teenagers are addicted to narcotics. While investigating the origin of the narcotics, Shahul learns about Kannan Bhai, a notorious drug lord, who is the virtual dictator of Kotha. Shahul meets Kannan Bhai at his casino along with Sub-Inspector Tony Titus, where he is humiliated and beaten by Kannan and Kannan's men, known as K-TEAM, after Shahul tried to arrest Kannan. This humiliates Shahul, who starts inquiring about Raju from Tony as Kannan had earlier mentioned the name. Tony then reveals Raju's past.

1986: Raju is a notorious and arrogant gangster, and Kannan's childhood friend, who was the former dictator of Kotha. Despite his violent nature, Raju was loved by the people of Kotha like a god. Tony and Kannan are part of Raju's gang and football team called “Winners Kotha.” Raju is always at loggerheads with Ranjith Bhai, the head of the neighboring town, Gandhigram. However, Ranjith never harms Raju out of respect for Raju's father, Kotha Ravi, who was also a gangster in the past.

Raju meets Tara and falls in love with her. Kannan tries to get Raju and his gang to deal with narcotics, but Raju disagrees because Tara's brother committed suicide due to a drug overdose. Raju does not have a good relationship with his parents, as his toxic mother, Malathi, hates him for being a gangster.

One day, Ranjith sends photos of Tara hanging out with a Bombay-based journalist named Nikhil, causing Raju to break up with Tara and start drinking heavily. Blinded by his greed for wealth and power, Kannan decides to partner with Ranjith and agrees to transport cannabis into Kotha. When Raju finds out, he becomes enraged and confronts Kannan, who refuses to reveal anything about the narcotics. Raju gets into a fight with Kannan and ends up injuring Kannan's right eye.

A few days later, Malathi realizes that Raju may not live for long due to his alcoholism and advises him to leave Kotha and never come back. Raju leaves Kotha on the night of the FIFA World Cup Finals and later goes missing.

1996: Shahul tells Tony to enquire about Raju with the UP Police, and Tony receives a fax from the Lucknow police station about Raju being a retired assassin named “Raju Madrassi.” Shahul sends a telegram to Raju, saying his sister Rithu is in danger. Kannan's drug-addicted brother-in-law Jinu and Rithu are in love. As they are sitting in a restaurant, Tony arrives with his force and takes Jinu away for carrying cannabis packets. Rithu later cuts all ties with Jinu. After his release, Jinu goes to Rithu's house to talk to her but is kicked out by Ravi. The next day, Jinu tries to set Rithu on fire by dousing her in gasoline, but she manages to escape as Tony arrives.

Jinu is brutally killed by Raju, who has returned to Kotha after receiving the telegram from Tony. Jinu's sister Manju learns about this and decides to kill Raju. It is also revealed that Kannan killed Ranjith in order to make Manju his wife. That night, Kannan meets Raju at a bar and learns that Raju has become more dangerous after going to UP. Manju sends men to kill Raju, but he thrashes them after a fight, which Manju witnesses. The next day, Shahul makes an offer to Raju to kill Kannan, but he declines, stating that Kannan is still his best friend. Kannan sends a contract killer named “Suitcase Leslie” to kill Raju, but Raju kills Leslie and sends his remains to Kannan. Kannan gets agitated and arrives at the market with his men, where they fight against Raju. Raju thrashes them and kills Kannan's right-hand man Erilan, thus avenging the death of his friend Rafi, leading Kannan to go into hiding.

That night, Raju goes to Tara's house to invite her to Rithu's birthday, but Kannan arrives and stabs Tara in front of Raju. As Tara is rushed to the hospital, Raju gets a call from Kannan and rushes to the dockyard, where he finds Ravi killed and hanged by Kannan's henchman Katta. Kannan's mother Kalikutty promises to bring Kannan to Raju so that Raju can kill him. Kannan captures Raju and stabs him, but Manju arrives. Raju reveals that he has known Manju since her teenage years as a prostitute and that Jinu was actually her son, born after she was assaulted by her stepfather. Humiliated, Manju leaves, and Raju escapes when the police arrive. Raju goes missing, and the townsfolk believe him to be dead.

However, Raju is still alive and planning his attack on Kannan. He sends a letter to Shahul, saying he has accepted Shahul's earlier offer. Raju kills all of Kannan's K-Team Members, including Njarambu, Katta, Memu, and Kukkudu, but spares Kannan's secretary Peelan. Raju offers the entire town of Kotha to Peelan in exchange for killing Kannan. Peelan accepts the offer and switches sides. Raju goes to Kannan's casino and confronts Kannan, who brings a group of contract killers to kill Raju. Raju kills all of them and incapacitates Kannan. Raju tells Kannan that he cannot kill him as he still considers him his best friend, and he brings Ranjith's son Sonu to kill him. It is also revealed that Ranjith's men helped Raju escape from Kannan's hideout earlier. Sonu kills Kannan and hands the gun over to Raju, who kills Peelan, declaring that Kotha doesn't need a dictator anymore.

1998: Raju is happily living with Tara and Rithu in Shimla, where he receives a call from his arch-enemy Dev Gujjar sent by Manju to kill him.

== Cast ==
- Dulquer Salmaan as Raju Madrassi (Note: Madraasi is also a slur used by people from North India to refer to people from South India, especially those from Tamil Nadu and Kerala.) alias "Kotha Raju", a ruthless and arrogant gangster, who was the former ruler of Kotha.
- Shabeer Kallarakkal as Kannan Bhai, Raju's childhood friend and a powerful drug lord, who currently rules Kotha. (voice dubbed by Sunny Wayne)
- Prasanna as CI Shahul Hassan, a newly appointed Police Officer of Kotha and Tony's superior officer, who tries to catch Kannan
- Gokul Suresh as SI Tony Titus, Raju's and Kannan's childhood friend and Shahul's assistant
- Aishwarya Lakshmi as Tara, Raju's Love interest
- Nyla Usha as Manju, Kannan's wife and Ranjith's former partner
- Saran Shakthi as Jinu, Manju's son and Rithu's ex-boyfriend, who is killed by Raju
- Chemban Vinod Jose as Ranjith Bhai, Raju's former rival and Manju's former partner
- Shammi Thilakan as Ravi Madrassi alias "Kotha Ravi", Raju's and Rithu's father and a former don at Kotha
- Anikha Surendran as Rithu "Ponnu", Raju's sister and Jinu's ex-girlfriend
  - Kiara Rinku Tomy as young Ponnu
- Shanthi Krishna as Malathi Madrassi, Raju's and Rithu's mother
- Srikant Murali as Tara's father
- Sudhi Koppa as Rafi
- Senthil Krishna as Kaalan
- T. G. Ravi as Vareeth, Ravi's friend
- Rajesh Sharma as Billa
- Rahul Madhav as Nikhil, Tara's ex-boyfriend
- Sajitha Madathil as Kalikutty, Kannan's mother
- Anumol as Shahul Hassan's wife
- Pramod Veliyanad as Muthu, Ranjith's brother
- Prasant Murali as Peelan, Kannan's secretary
- Kichu Tellus as Bijoy, Kannan's rival and enemy
- Adhri Joe as Memu
- Midhun Venugopal as Katta
- Madhan Mohan
- Sanoop Dinesh as Erilan, Kannan's right-hand man
- Govind Pai as Sonu, Ranjith's son
- Manju Vani as Muthu's wife
- Nisha Sarang as Sister Reena
- Sachin Shyam
- Soubin Shahir as Suitcase Leslie (cameo appearance)
- Ritika Singh as a dancer (cameo appearance in the song "Kalapakkaara")

== Production ==
=== Development ===
The film along with its title was announced on 28 July 2021 on the occasion of Dulquer Salmaan's 35th birthday. Salmaan who portrays a gangster in the film stated: "King of Kotha will be having all these elements (perfectly timed clap points, catchy songs, and elevation sequences) that could satisfy the audience." He also added that this is a dream project with his childhood friend Abhilash Joshiy, son of veteran filmmaker Joshiy, and have been waiting for the past few years to find a perfect project to collaborate. It is written by Abhilash N. Chandran, who had earlier worked on Porinju Mariam Jose (2019). In October 2022, Salmaan stated in an interview that, "It is an action gangster genre, noir film set in a fictional town. It's interesting because I generally tend to veer away from this type of cinema quite a bit. But I found a bit of a balance. I feel like it has content, it has great writing, but it's also a very commercial gangster drama." On 23 June 2023 the film's motion poster, titled "People of Kotha" was launched.

=== Filming and casting ===
The principal photography began on 27 September 2022 at Karaikudi, while additional filming occurred in Rameswaram and Ramanathapuram. Nimish Ravi joined as the film's cinematographer. After rumours of Samantha Ruth Prabhu being approached for a role, it was reported that Aishwarya Lekshmi was signed to play Salmaan's pair. Shabeer Kallarakkal was roped in to play the main antagonist. Actor Gokul Suresh was cast to play a pivotal role and actors Chemban Vinod Jose and Sudhi Koppa were also added to the cast. Nyla Usha and Shanthi Krishna were also cast in key roles. Zee Studios associated with Wayfarer Films for the film's production and marked its maiden feature film production venture in Malayalam. It was reported that, a major schedule in Karaikudi was interrupted due to the rain, and the team took a brief break. Ritika Singh joined the production in early-November 2022 and shot for an item song. In December 2022, Shammi Thilakan announced his addition to the cast through his Facebook page. In January 2023, Prasanna and Saran Shakthi confirmed being cast in the film. Filming took 95 days and the Karaikudi schedule was wrapped up on 21 February 2023.

== Music ==
The background score is composed by Jakes Bejoy while the songs have been composed by Jakes Bejoy and Shaan Rahman separately. The music rights were bagged by Sony Music India. The track "People of Kotha" that was featured in the motion poster video was released on 23 June 2023, the same date as the promo. The first single titled "Kalapakkaara" was released on 28 July 2023, on the occasion of Salmaan's birthday. The second single titled "Ee Ulakin" was released on 18 August 2023. The soundtrack was released on 23 August 2023, by Sony Music India.

== Release ==
=== Theatrical ===
King of Kotha was theatrically released on 24 August 2023, coinciding with Onam. The film was intended to be released in Malayalam, along with the dubbed versions in Tamil, Telugu, Hindi and Kannada.

=== Home media ===
The film was premiered on Disney+ Hotstar from 29 September 2023 in Malayalam and in dubbed versions of Tamil, Telugu and Kannada languages. The Hindi version premiered on the platform from 20 October 2023.

== Reception ==
King of Kotha generally received negative reviews from critics, with criticism on its screenplay, clichéd plot, dialogues and direction. However the background scores, cinematography and technical aspects were praised.

=== Critical response ===
Sanjith Sidhardhan of OTTplay gave 3.5 out of 5 stars and wrote, "King of Kotha might have a familiar storyline that feels stretched out in parts, but Dulquer's performance along with the grand visuals make this gangster revenge saga worth watching in theatres." Anandu Suresh of The Indian Express gave 3 out of 5 stars and wrote, "Though the Dulquer Salmaan-starrer possessed the potential to be celebrated alongside iconic gangster movies like Satya, Vada Chennai, and Gangs of Wasseypur, its failure to feature a compelling narrative prevents it from reaching the lofty heights it aspired to achieve."

Ronak Kotecha of The Times of India gave 3 out of 5 stars and wrote, "King of Kotha suffers from the same old problem of not knowing how much is too much. Short of becoming a cult gangster classic, it does have the mass appeal and the ability to hold its audience captive for a long time. It just doesn't know when to stop." Janani K. of India Today gave 2.5 out of 5 stars and wrote, "King of Kotha is a gangster drama that has many interesting ideas, but they are underused. Despite the pacing issues, the film holds your attention."

Gautaman Bhaskaran of News18 gave 2.5 out of 5 stars and wrote, "King of Kotha has a nice plot, but an over-ambitious scripting pushes it in a multitude of paths with the cream of it all turning sour. The narrative is uneven, and direction not quite up to the mark." Priyanka Sundar of Firstpost gave 2 out of 5 stars and wrote, "If King Of Kotha had as much of an emotional depth as Dulquer Salmaan's one dialogue that explains his love for Aishwarya Lekshmi's Thara — we would have probably had a winner." Nirmal Jovial of The Week gave 2 out of 5 stars and wrote, "King of Kotha clocks in at nearly three hours in duration. A more judicious and precise editing process could have resulted in a more tolerable viewing experience. Stylised action sequences cannot compensate for the weak script."

Princy Alexander of Onmanorama wrote, "Though the film gets a little predictable towards the end, the filmmakers have tried to steer clear from sticking to the old formula of mass action films. The songs, the visuals, and the style of making have helped elevate the film, so it appeals to a pan-Indian audience." S. R. Praveen of The Hindu wrote, "King of Kotha, in the end, is an unabashed vehicle for Dulquer's superstardom aspirations, but it does not pack enough of a punch to become the crowning glory that it was intended to be." Vishal Menon of Film Companion wrote, "With the freshness limited to the visuals and the music department, the moments of high King Of Kotha achieve quickly deflate just when you feel the film has done its job. Sadly, there's only so much you can do with daggers and swagger when the runtime is close to three hours."

=== Box office ===
King of Kotha had a strong opening at worldwide box office grossing over ₹17 crore worldwide and ₹9 crore (₹6 crore from Kerala and ₹3 crore from ROI circuit) which was the second highest opening for a Malayalam film at the Indian box office after Odiyan (2018).

King of Kotha grossed $9,619 in New Zealand, $160,553 in the United Kingdom, $674,061 in the United Arab Emirates and $45,206 in Australia, totaling $889,439 in international earnings The film was a box office bomb.
