= Burqa (film) =

- Official poster
- Directed by: Sarjun KM
- Screenplay by: Anusuya Vasudevan
- Starring: Kalaiyarasan; Mirnaa
- Cinematography: G. Balamurugan
- Edited by: B. Pravin Baaskar
- Music by: Sivatmikha
- Distributed by: Aha Tamil
- Release date: 7 April 2023
- Running time: 82 minutes
- Country: India
- Language: Tamil

Burqa is a 2023 Indian Tamil-language film written and directed by Sarjun KM. It stars Kalaiyarasan and Mirnaa in the lead roles. The movie was premiered at the New York Indian Film Festival and was nominated under Best Film, Best Actor and Best Actress categories.

== Plot ==
Burqa, is set against the backdrop of a Muslim ritual that revolves around 21-year-old recently widowed Najma (Mirnaa), who meets an injured stranger, Surya (Kalaiyarasan), under unlikely circumstances. Najma, who is a nurse by education, was married two months ago through arranged marriage. Her husband is a nice man who warms up to her and they start to like each other. They plan for their honeymoon to consummate their wedding, but the husband dies in a road accident. She is put in a mourning period for 3 months where she should not meet any other man. On a night in the second week of the mourning period, she is alone in her house when an injured man Surya knocks on her door. Grudgingly she tends to him and realizes that he is a goon for a Hindu fanatic party. She refuses to show her face to him, and Surya is forced to stay in for two days due to curfew outside. They have a long discussion about religion, gender and equality.

== Cast ==
- Kalaiyarasan as Surya
- Mirnaa as Najma
- G. M. Kumar as Vaapa
- Suriyanarayanan as Anwar

== Reception ==
Chandhini R critic of Cinema Express wrote that "Burqa is a film that not just creates room for a discussion on progressiveness and liberation, but also reflects on the hard-hitting reality of how it is not easy to change or rather accept change" and gave 3 stars out of 5. Gopinath Rajendran critic of The Hindu said "The change in tones and the intensity of fieriness in the words exchanged between them, though not exactly coherent, break the monotony of Burqa which could’ve easily slid into the ‘this meeting could’ve been an e-mail’ category." Haricharan Pudipeddi critic of Hindustan Times stated that "Unlike most Tamil films, Burqa plays out like a conversational drama and it works beautifully in the film’s favour. Even though the film discusses issues like religion, faith and cultural practices among others, it never feels it’s trying hard to leave an impact". OTTplay critic noted that "Burqa is one of those films that reminds you that one doesn't have to be strong to brace through the loss of a loved one. You can be weak; feel powerless and still, move on with life. The process, in itself, will empower you. Amid mediocre big-budget films that choke theatres every Friday, I'm glad that I caught Burqa, which provided me with a sense of fulfilment" and gave 4 out 5 stars

== Release ==
Burqa joined Aha's library of films and premiered on their platform on 6 April 2023.
