= Pattathaari =

2016 Indian film by A.R. Sankara Pandi

Pattathari
- Theatrical release poster
- Directed by: A.R. Sankara Pandi
- Written by: A.R. Sankara Pandi
- Screenplay by: A.R. Sankara Pandi
- Story by: Ram Manoj Kumar
- Produced by: S. Elangovan
- Starring: Abi Saravanan; Adhiti Menon
- Cinematography: Suriyan
- Edited by: A. Richard Kevin
- Music by: S. S. Kumaran
- Production company: GES Movies
- Release date: 25 November 2016
- Running time: 105 minutes
- Country: India
- Language: Tamil

Pattathari (transl. Graduate) is a 2016 Indian Tamil-language romantic action film written and directed by A.R. Sankara Pandi.

== Plot ==
The story focuses on the friendship between five people who do not care about taking responsibilities on their shoulders even after graduation and how their life changes forms the rest of the story.

== Cast ==
- Abi Saravanan as Shiva
- Adhiti Menon as Ilakiya
- Saro as Rasika
- Ambani Shankar as Suresh
- Durai as Ranjith
- Karthik as Viji
- Athira Santhosh
- Srn. Aananthan as Saravanan
- K. Kalaiyarasan as Bhagyanathan
- Mahanadi Shankar as Muthukaruppan
- Crane Manohar as Hotel Owner
- M. Shanmugasundaram as Advocate
- Inba as Counsellor
- Jaya Vani as Inspector
- Ram as Gopi
- Senthil as Shiva's father
- Reeta as Shiva's mother
- Ramkumar as Ilakiya's father
- Shanti as Ilakiya's mother
- Boopathy as Rasika's father
- Kavita as Rasika's mother
- Yuva as Rasika's cousin
- Pavithra as Ranjith's girlfriend
- Rose as Viji's girlfriend
- Preethi as Suresh's girlfriend

== Soundtrack ==
Soundtrack was composed by S. S. Kumaran.

- "Single Sim" - Vaikom Vijayalakshmi
- "Kannodu" - Chinmayi
- "Pattathari" - Naresh Iyer
- "Bencha Thodachavan" - Prasanna

== Release ==
The Times of India gave the film one-and-a-half out of five stars and wrote that "Save for Adhiti, who is expressive and is a promising find, the other actors lack screen presence, and barely register". The Times of India Samayam gave the film two-and-a-half out of five stars.
