= Birthmark (film) =

- Theatrical release poster
- Directed by: Vikram Shreedharan
- Written by: Vikram Shreedharan; Sriram Sivaraman
- Produced by: Vikram Shreedharan; Sriram Sivaraman
- Starring: Shabeer Kallarakkal; Mirnaa
- Cinematography: Udhay Thangavel
- Edited by: Iniyavan Pandian
- Music by: Vishal Chandrashekhar
- Production company: Sapiens Entertainment
- Release date: 23 February 2024
- Running time: 117 minutes
- Country: India
- Language: Tamil

Birthmark is a 2024 Indian Tamil-language thriller drama film written and directed by Vikram Shreedharan. The film stars Shabeer Kallarakkal and Mirnaa in the lead roles. The film was produced by Vikram Shreedharan and Sriram Sivaraman under the banners of Sapiens Entertainment.

== Plot ==
Divided into four chapters, the film follows Indian Army Lieutenant Daniel and his six-month pregnant wife Jennifer. Daniel struggles with PTSD; he was rescued recently after having been abducted in the war zone six months prior. Meanwhile, Jennifer suffers from various health complications, which prompts Daniel into accompanying her to the Dhavanthri natural birthing village in Kerala, which follows the midwifery birthing model of childbirth. The village is overseen by the elderly Kundhavi. Upon their arrival, a couple leaves the birthing village carrying their newborn in-hand. Something about the couple seems off; they appear sad and deflated despite just having had a child together. Reflecting on their shared memories, Daniel and Jennifer unite to overcome challenges to bring their baby into the world.

== Cast ==
- Shabeer Kallarakkal as Daniel
- Mirnaa Menon as Jennifer
- Porkodi Senthil as Asha
- Indirajith as Sebastian
- Deepthie Orientelu as Amulu
- P. R. Varalakshmi as Kundhavi
- Kavitha Suresh as Daniel's mother
- Naju as Daniel's father
- Aalam as Young Daniel

== Production ==
The film has a technical crew consisting of cinematographer Udhay Thangavel, music composer Vishal Chandrashekhar, art director Ramu Thangaraj and editor Iniyavan Pandiyan.

== Reception ==
Roopa Radhakrishnan of The Times of India rated 3 out of 5 and noted that "Shabeer Kallarakal and Mirnaa are wonderful as the leads and do their best to sell everything that’s going on". Maalai Malar critic stated that the director Vikram Sreedharan has directed the film with a different story; he is concentrating on making an English film. A critic from Cinema Express wrote "Birthmark holds our attention with an engaging setup but due to odd directorial choices, tonal issues, and a weak screenplay, we rarely feel the tension that the film wants us to feel".
