= Tamizh Prabha =

Indian Screenwriter

Thamizh Prabha
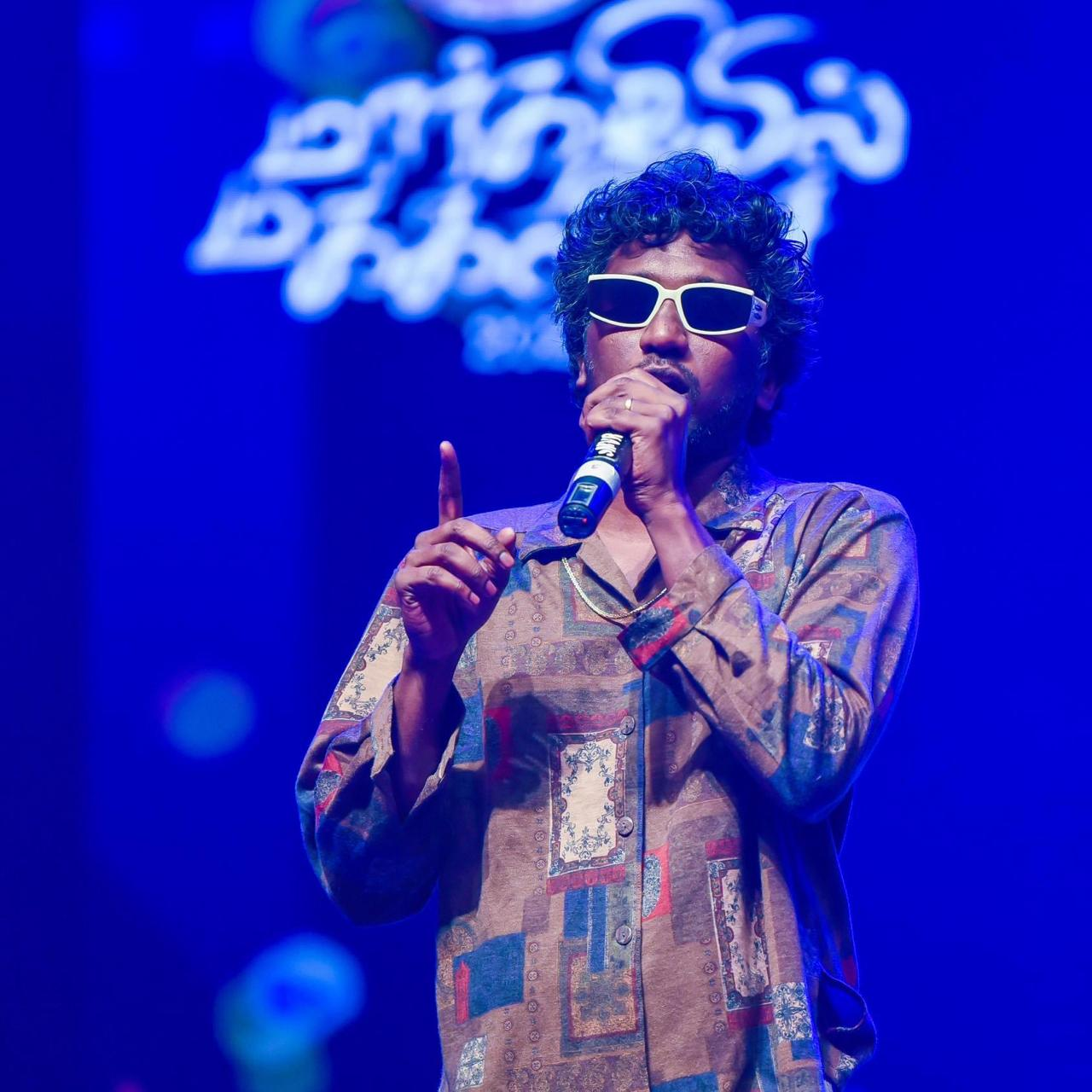
- Born: Tamil Nadu
- Other name: Tamil Prabha
- Occupations: screenwriter, Novelist
- Notable work: Sarpatta Parambarai, Thangalaan, Pettai

Thamizh Prabha (also known as Tamil Prabha, pen name of Prabhakaran) is an Indian screenwriter and novelist. He is best known for his novels Pettai, Kosalai and the films Sarpatta Parambarai, Thangalaan and Blue Star.

== Career ==
Thamizh Prabha started his career as a financial analyst. His first job as a writer was as a journalist for the weekly magazine Ananda Vikatan. He wrote feature articles about a variety of social issues. His portfolio includes articles on the 2019 Thuthukudi fire tragedy, the untimely death of Anitha, a promising student, and a number of other topics. Vikatan Magazine's series 'Theivathaan aahatheninum' chronicled interesting tales that piqued readers' interest.

In 2017, he authored his debut novel, titled "Pettai," which was published by Kalachuvadu Publications. Tamizh Praba worked as a radio jockey at Rainbow FM for a period of two years.

He was the screenwriter and dialogue writer for Pa Ranjith's movie Sarpatta Parambarai released in 2022.

In 2024 he wrote the screenplay and dialogue of Pa. Ranjith's directorial Thangalaan, S. Jayakumar's Blue Star and Sidharth Vishwanath's Sorgavaasal.

The New York Times listed Sarpatta Parambarai as one of "the five best International films to stream on digital platforms".

In 2025, Tamizh Prabha wrote the story of Rana Daggubati starrer, Kaantha.

Thamizh Prabha is one of the featured speakers at Living Tamil Litfest 2026, which is an international Tamil literary festival held in New York City that celebrates contemporary Tamil literature and culture on a global stage.

== Films ==
- Sarpatta Parambarai (2021)
- Blue Star (2024)
- Thangalaan (2024)
- Sorgavaasal (2024)
- Kaantha (2025)

== Novels ==
- Pettai (2017) published by Kalachuvadu Publications. This metafiction is the tale of Chindadripet – its inhabitants, their way of life, religious convictions, their food, music, culture, socio-political dynamics, societal perceptions, etc. Revolving around two generations of families, the story is told through the protagonist Reuben. The News Minute says “Altogether, this novel is part history textbook, part sociology textbook, romance guidebook and a deep rumination about insanity, all in a satiric tone, which makes it very entertaining."
- Kosalai (2022) published by Neelam Publications. The narrative commences with delving into the life of Kosalai, a young woman who is afflicted by dwarfism. Devoid of any sympathetic treatment, the story effectively portrays the inner emotions of Kosalai, immersing the reader in the imaginary realm of Kosalai's quest for self-discovery. Focusing on Kosalai's affection, bereavement, aspirations, ambitions, and tenacity, the narrative commemorates Kosalai's life.
