= Crazy Fellow =

Indian Telugu-language romantic drama film

- Release poster
- Directed by: Phani Krishna Siriki
- Produced by: K. K. Radhamohan
- Starring: Aadi Saikumar; Digangana Suryavanshi; Mirnaa Menon
- Cinematography: Satish Muthyala
- Edited by: Satya Giduturi
- Music by: RR Dhruvan
- Production company: Sri Sathya Sai Arts
- Release date: 14 October 2022
- Running time: 145 mins
- Country: India
- Language: Telugu

Crazy Fellow is a 2022 Indian Telugu-language romantic drama film directed by Phani Krishna Siriki and starring Aadi Saikumar, Digangana Suryavanshi and Mirnaa Menon in her Telugu debut.

== Cast ==
- Aadi Saikumar as Abhiram alias Nani
- Digangana Suryavanshi as Madhu
- Mirnaa Menon as Chinni
- Anish Kuruvilla as Abhiram's brother
- Vinodhini Vaidyanathan as Abhiram's sister-in-law
- Narra Srinu
- Saptagiri as Abhiram's coworker
- Ravi Prakash
- Pawan as Chinni's brother
- Priya Hegde
- Tasty Teja
- Deepthi Naidu

== Reception ==
A critic from The Times of India wrote that "Watch it if you don't mind a simple story aided by good performances and numerous cinematic liberties". A critic from The New Indian Express wrote that "Overall, Crazy Fellow has all those ingredients and entertaining moments, making it a good time-pass watch for this weekend".

== Home media ==
The film premiered on aha from 3 December 2022 in Telugu.
