= Naa Saami Ranga =

- Theatrical release poster
- Directed by: Vijay Binni
- Screenplay by: Vijay Binni
- Story by: Abhilash N. Chandran
- Dialogues by: Prasanna Kumar Bezawada
- Based on: Porinju Mariam Jose (2019) by Joshiy
- Produced by: Srinivasa Chitturi
- Starring: Nagarjuna; Allari Naresh; Raj Tarun; Ashika Ranganath; Shabeer Kallarakkal
- Cinematography: Dasaradhi Sivendra
- Edited by: Chota K. Prasad
- Music by: M. M. Keeravani
- Production companies: Srinivasaa Silver Screen; Annapurna Studios
- Release date: 14 January 2024
- Running time: 146 minutes
- Country: India
- Language: Telugu
- Budget: ₹20 crore

Naa Saami Ranga (transl. My Goodness Gracious) is a 2024 Indian Telugu-language period action drama directed by choreographer Vijay Binni, in his directorial debut, with an original story written by Abhilash N. Chandran. An official adaptation to the 2019 Malayalam-language film Porinju Mariam Jose, it starred Nagarjuna, Allari Naresh, Raj Tarun, Ashika Ranganath, and Shabeer Kallarakkal, while Mirnaa Menon, Rukshar Dhillon, and Nassar play supporting roles. The soundtrack of the film is composed by M. M. Keeravani, while Dasaradhi Sivendra and Chota K. Prasad handled the cinematography and editing, respectively.

The film was released theatrically on 14 January 2024, coinciding with Makar Sankranti, and received mixed-to-positive reviews from the critics.

== Plot ==
In 1963 at Ambajipeta, Kishtayya, an orphan, befriends Anji and his mother, who welcome him into their family. As Anji and Kishtayya develop a sibling-like bond, Anji's mother passes away, and her creditor Varadaraju asks the kids to repay the loan by selling their house to him. Varadaraju's attempts are thwarted by Peddayya, the village's local government leader, who offers to repay their loan. This forges a sense of loyalty in Kishtayya towards Peddayya. Meanwhile, Anji tries to persuade Kishtayya to confess his love to Varadaraju's daughter, Varamahalakshmi "Varalu". Kishtayya, however, fails to do so when he saves Peddayya, who is injured in an accident on the same day when he planned to propose to Varalu. As a group of people run towards Peddayya to kill him, Kishtayya picks up Peddayya's revolver and shoots them to save the latter's life. Since then, Peddayya considered both Kishtayya and Anji as his own men and is affectionate towards them, which angers his children. Varadaraju, meanwhile, sends Varalu to Madras for her higher education, separating her from Kishtayya.

In 1988, Kishtayya lives with Anji and his wife, Manga, along with their daughter, and has remained unmarried, hoping to marry Varalu, who now manages her father's businesses. She too remains unmarried and continues to love Kishtayya but does not accept his proposal for marriage. A day before Bhogi, when one of the villagers, Bhaskar, is attacked by the goons of the neighbouring village Jagganna Thota's president, Veerabhadrudu, Kishtayya saves him on Peddayya's request. Peddayya asks Kishtayya and Anji to take care of Bhaskar until the ongoing situation cools down, and Anji learns that Veerabhadrudu is against the proposal of Bhaskar marrying his daughter Kumari, who studied together and are in a relationship. Anji reveals to Bhaskar that Varalu and Kishtayya were also in a relationship 10 years ago, which was opposed by Varadaraju as Peddayya wanted his son Dasu to marry her in an arranged marriage.

While Peddayya cancelled the alliance respecting Kishtayya's feelings and blessed them, Varadaraju continued to oppose them, which forced Varalu to leave her house. As she was leaving, Varadaraju tied a rope around his neck and threatened to hang himself from the ceiling fan if she ran away. However, Varadaraju accidentally lost his grip and hanged himself to death. Due to this, a guilt-ridden Varalu chose to live alone without marrying Kishtayya, though she continues to love him and meets him regularly. As Veerabhadrudu continues to oppose Bhaskar and Kumari's marriage and deems Kishtayya responsible for his defeat, he learns from his aides that a year ago, Dasu returned to his village to attend the ongoing Bhogi festival from Dubai after completing jail time for an attempted murder. He learned from Peddayya that Varalu was still unmarried and visited her house, and forced himself on her, to which she humiliated him publicly. Anji then picked up a fight with Dasu and chased him to a fair throughout the festival procession, where a fight happened between Anji and Peddayya's children. Kishtayya broke up the fight, but Dasu still attacked Anji, leading to Kishtayya and Anji to retaliate and beat up Dasu and his brothers.

A year later, on Makar Sankranti, Kishtayya promises his village that the procession would be peacefully carried into Jagganna Thota on the next day as part of the Kanuma festival celebrations, despite Veerabhadrudu's stance against him and Peddayya, and also that Bhaskar and Kumari would get married before the festival. Dasu, seizing an opportunity to harm Anji, attacks him at a movie theatre and kills him. This sends Kishtayya into a rage, who vows to kill Dasu. Peddayya, fearing the death of his children, begs them to leave the village until Kishtayya's rage subsides, but to no avail. Dasu joins hands with Veerabhadrudu, kidnaps both Bhaskar and Kumari, and attacks Kishtayya just as he enters Jagganna Thota leading the procession. There, Kishtayya manages to kill Dasu and many of Veerabhadrudu's henchmen, which makes the latter let go of Bhaskar and Kumari out of fear. Varalu, who now wishes to be with Kishtayya, arranges to get bail for him in case he goes to court for the killings.

That night, as Kishtayya goes to Peddayya's house along with the villagers to apologize for his act; Peddayya hugs and consoles him. However, he takes out a hidden knife and stabs Kishtayya multiple times, saying that his son's life mattered to him, but not to Kishtayya. The bystanders surround them, but Kishtayya snatches the knife, tells everyone to back off, and orders Peddayya to go back in to his house. Varalu arrives and Kishtayya, who promises he would survive the attack, asks her to marry him. The film ends with a visual from a few years later, with a now married Kishtayya and Varalu leaving on a bike as their son, named after Anji, follows them on foot.

== Cast ==
- Nagarjuna as Kishtayya
  - Kothala Bhanu Prakash as young Kishtayya
- Allari Naresh as Anji, Kishtayya's younger brother
- Raj Tarun as Bhaskar, Kishtayya's friend
- Ashika Ranganath as Varamahalakshmi "Varalu", Kishtayya's girlfriend
- Mirnaa Menon as Manga, Anji's wife
- Rukshar Dhillon as Kumari, Bhaskar's love interest
- Nassar as Peddayya, Kishtayya's father-figure
- Madhumani as Peddayya's wife
- Shabeer Kallarakkal as Dasu, Peddayya's youngest son
- Ravi Varma as Lakshmipathi, Peddayya's eldest son
- Bharath Reddy as Peddayya's second son
- Rao Ramesh as Varadaraju, Varalu's father
- Madhusudan Rao as Veerabhadrudu, Kumari's father and Kishtayya's rival
- Harsha Vardhan as Police SI Thirupatayya
- Prabhas Sreenu as Rambabu, Dasu's childhood friend
- Shakalaka Shankar as Bhaskar's brother-in-law
- Karuna Bhushan as Bhaskar's sister
- Vadlamani Srinivas as Bhaskar's father
- Prabhavathi Varma as Bhaskar's father
- Mahesh Achanta as Bullabbayi, Kishtayya's aide

== Soundtrack ==
The soundtrack and background score are composed by M. M. Keeravani in his 17th collaboration with Nagarjuna.

No.	Title	Lyrics	Singers	Length
1.	"Etthukelli Povaalanipisthunde"	Chandrabose	Ram Miriyala	3:48
2.	"Naa Saami Ranga Title Song"	Chandrabose	Kaala Bhairava, Rahul Sipligunj	3:20
3.	"Whistle Theme Song"	M. M. Keeravani	Sandilya Pisapati	3:09
4.	"Dummu Dhukanam"	Chandrabose	Kareemullah, Sahithi Chaganti, Sai Charan, Lokesh, Arun Kaundinya, Hymath Mohammed	4:05
5.	"Inka Inka"	M. M. Keeravani	Maman Kumar, Satya Yamini	3:31
6.	"Seesa Mootha Ippu"	Chandrabose	Mallikarjun, Revanth, Saicharan, Lokesh, Hymath, Arun Kaundiya	2:41

== Release ==
=== Theatrical ===
The film was theatrically released on 14 January 2024, coinciding with Makar Sankranti.

=== Home media ===
The film was premiered on Disney+ Hotstar from 17 February 2024.

== Reception ==
Paul Nicodemus of The Times of India rated 3.5/5 stars, saying that "Naa Saami Ranga marks a triumphant comeback for Akkineni Nagarjuna in the commercial cinema landscape. The film's successful amalgamation of mass appeal, a compelling narrative, and emotional depth makes it a commendable watch, resonating well with its audience during the festive Sankranti season. In a nutshell, it is a wholesome family entertainer!" Neeshitha Nyayapati of Hindustan Times praised the music, acting and camerawork, saying that, "Naa Saami Ranga is a no-nonsense rural drama that's a decent watch for Sankranthi."

Vivek MV of The Hindu wrote, "A remake of Porinju Mariam Jose, Vijay Binni's 'Naa Saami Ranga', starring Nagarjuna and Ashika Ranganath, is a 'masala' affair that plays it safe and misses the point of the original."

Avad Mohammed of OTTplay gave 3/5 stars, gave a verdict, "On the whole, Naa Saami Ranga is a routine village drama that offers nothing new in terms of story. But the way it is mounted with A-listers, the presence of decent comedy, solid fights, and colourful visuals make this film a time-pass watch this festive season."
