= Kalavani Mappillai =

- Film poster
- Directed by: Gandhi Manivasagam
- Produced by: Rajeshwari Manivasagam; Gandhi Manivasagam
- Starring: Dinesh; Adhiti Menon
- Cinematography: Saravanan Abimanyu
- Edited by: Pon Kathiresh
- Music by: N. R. Raghunanthan
- Production company: Rajapushpa Pictures
- Release date: 6 November 2018
- Running time: 120 minutes
- Country: India
- Language: Tamil

Kalavani Mappillai (transl. Thieving son-in-law) is a 2018 Indian Tamil-language comedy film, directed by Gandhi Manivasagam. Starring Dinesh and Adhiti Menon, Anandraj and Devayani. the film production began on 15 February 2018 and was released on 6 November 2018.

== Plot ==
The film involves a childhood rivalry between Deva and Villangam, a hastily built romance between Deva and Thulasi, a back story for why Thulasi's mother Rajeswari wants a son-in-law who can drive, a henpecked husband, and a comic character named Vanagamoodi who could expose Deva's lies.

== Cast ==
- Dinesh as Deva
- Adhiti Menon as Thulasi
- Anandaraj as Thulasi's father
- Devayani as Rajeshwari, Thulasi's mother
- Ramdoss as Villangam
- Rajendran as Vanagaamudi
- Chaams as Stepni
- Manobala
- Renuka as Deva's mother
- Crane Manohar
- Lallu as Sathish, Deva's friend

== Production ==
A puja was held on 7 February 2018, and principal photography began on 15 February in Pollachi.
