= Shabeer Kallarakkal =

Indian actor

- Born: Chennai, Tamil Nadu, India
- Other name: Dancing Rose Shabeer
- Occupation: Actor
- Years active: 2004–present

Shabeer Kallarakkal, also known as Dancing Rose Shabeer, is an Indian actor who works in South Indian films and plays. He is best known for his roles in the Tamil film Sarpatta Parambarai (2021) and the Malayalam film King of Kotha (2023).

== Career ==
Shabeer appeared in an uncredited role in Aayutha Ezhuthu (2004). He later acted in many theatrical plays. Shabeer made his full-fledged feature film debut by playing the lead role in Lakshmy Ramakrishnan's Nerungi Vaa Muthamidathe (2014). Featuring alongside actresses Pia Bajpiee and Sruthi Hariharan, Shabeer portrayed a lorry driver caught up in a petrol crisis. On the back of his performance in his first film, he was cast in 54321 (2016). Shabeer portrayed the lead antagonist in the film, with the director stating that he chose the actor because of his experience in theatre performances and his ability to act.

In 2018, Shabeer portrayed a small role in Adanga Maru (2018). He was later signed by Karthik Subbaraj to play a role in Petta (2019).

Shabeer's most notable performance was as boxer Dancing Rose in the 2021 film Sarpatta Parambarai, which earned him fame. He made his Malayalam and Telugu debuts with King of Kotha (2023) and Naa Saami Ranga (2024), respectively, playing antagonistic roles in both films.

Shabeer made his Kannada debut in 2024 with Bhairathi Ranagal, a sequel to the 2017 Kannada film Mufti, acting alongside Shivrajkumar under Narthan's direction.

== Filmography ==
Key
†	Denotes films that have not yet been released

List of Shabeer Kallarakkal film credits
Year	Title	Role	Notes
2004	Aayutha Ezhuthu		Uncredited role
2014	Nerungi Vaa Muthamidathe	Chandru Subrahmanyam	
2016	54321	Vikram	
2018	Adanga Maru	Bhuvanesh	
2019	Petta	Arjith	
2020	Mamakiki	Madhu's prospective groom	
2021	Teddy	Harish	
2021	Sarpatta Parambarai	Dancing Rose	
2022	Natchathiram Nagargiradhu	Sagas Ratchagan	
2023	King of Kotha	Kannan Bhai	Malayalam film
2023	The Road	Maayazhagan	
2024	Naa Saami Ranga	Dasu	Telugu film
2024	Birthmark	Daniel	
2024	Kondal	Jude	Malayalam film
2024	Bhairathi Ranagal	Ghatta	Kannada film
2025	Jack	South	Telugu film
2025	Madharaasi	Chirag	
2025	Thandakaaranyam	Amitabh	

Documentaries

- Where The Trees Sing (2017)
