= Mirnaa =

Indian film actress

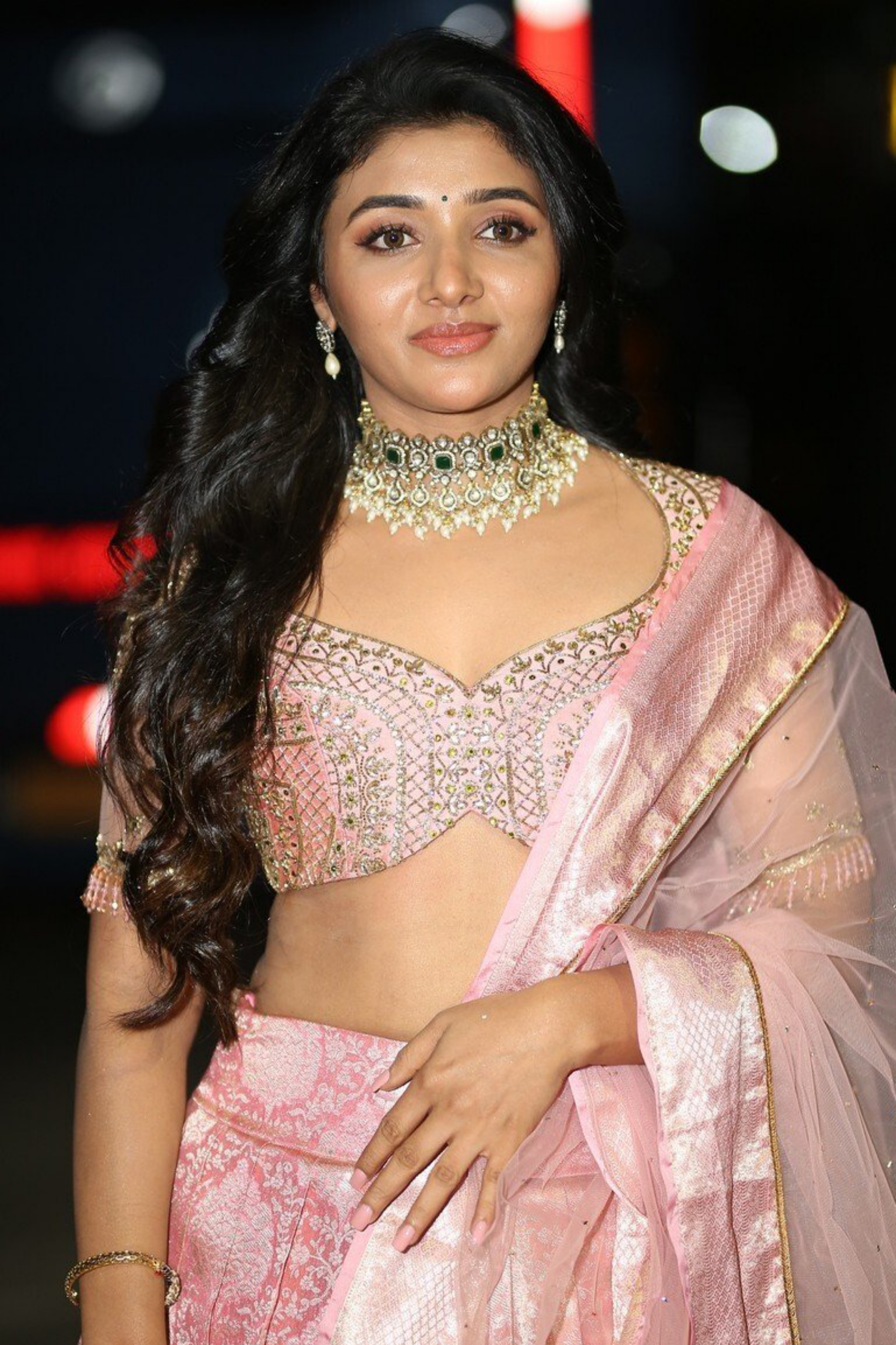
- Mirnaa in 2024
- Born: Saranya Santhosh
- Other names: Athira Santhosh, Adhiti Menon
- Occupations: Actress; model
- Years active: 2016–present

Mirnaa is an Indian actress who acts in Tamil, Malayalam and Telugu films. She started her film career as Adhiti Menon and debuted in the 2016 Tamil film Pattathaari. After appearing in the Malayalam film, Big Brother (2020) and the Telugu films Crazy Fellow (2022) and Ugram (2023), she landed a pivotal role in her highest-profile project till date, Rajinikanth's Jailer (2023).

== Early life ==
Mirnaa is a Malayali, hailing from Idukki, Kerala. Her parents are Santhosh Kumar and Shobana Santhosh and she has two sisters. She studied at the Sacred Heart High School in Ramakkalmedu.

== Career ==
Before pursuing a career in acting, Mirnaa has worked as a software developer in Dubai but since she had always wanted to be become an actress, she came back to Kerala. Mirnaa had her start in television with her original name when she made appearances in a reality show and a series named Dhathuputhri. In October 2015, Mirnaa accepted to play the female lead in the Tamil film Nedunalvaadai, taking the screen name Athira Santhosh. During the making of the film she was reported to have attempted suicide. She alleged that she was harassed and tortured by its director Selvakannan and that she took the decision to end her life when she received no support from the police or the film authorities. After she left that project, she changed her name to Adhiti Menon and got cast in the Tamil film Pattathaari, which released by late 2016 and marked her film debut. Although the film opened to negative reviews, her performance won her appreciation, with The Times of India writing "Adhiti is expressive and is a promising find".

Even prior to the release of Pattathaari, she signed on to be part of Ameer's Santhana Devan. The film, which was reported to be a period piece revolving around Jallikattu and to feature Arya and his brother Sathya, entered principal photography by early 2017, with Mirnaa also participating in major parts of the shooting; however, the film has been miring in production hell and although news about a revival of the project emerged by 2021 again, the film has not been released yet. Her next release was the Tamil comedy Kalavani Mappillai. The film was the directorial debut of Gandhi, son of director Manivasagam, and featured Mirnaa alongside Attakathi Dinesh. Writing about Mirnaa, Anupama Subramanian from Deccan Chronicle noted that she "looks pretty and has given a decent performance".

By mid-2020 she underwent a name change once again, rechristening herself to Mirnaa. She debuted in the Malayalam and Telugu film industry with Big Brother that starred Mohanlal and Aadi Saikumar's Crazy Fellow (2022), respectively. Big Brother, on which Mirnaa worked for almost 100 days, was Siddique's final film and ended as a critical and commercial failure. About Mirnaa's performance in Crazy Fellow, The New Indian Express's critic said that she "impresses with her realistic portrayal". Her first 2023 release was Allari Naresh's Ugram. Mirnaa then portrayed a young Muslim widow observing iddah in KM Sarjun's Burqa. She and her co-star Kalaiyarasan were both lauded for their performances in Burqa. Later that year, she appeared in a supporting role in the Nelson-directed Jailer starring Rajinikanth.

== Filmography ==
Key
†	Denotes films that have not yet been released

=== Films ===
Year	Title	Role	Language	Notes	Ref.
2016	Pattathaari	Ilakiya	Tamil	Debut Film; credited as Adhiti Menon	
2018	Kalavani Mappillai	Thulasi	Tamil	credited as Adhiti Menon	
2020	Big Brother	Arya Shetty	Malayalam	Malayalam debut	
2022	Crazy Fellow	Chinni	Telugu	Telugu Debut	
2023	Ugram	Aparna	Telugu		
2023	Burqa	Najma	Tamil		
2023	Jailer	Swetha Pandian	Tamil		
2024	Naa Saami Ranga	Manga	Telugu		
2024	Birthmark	Jennifer	Tamil		
2026	Jailer 2	Swetha Pandian	Tamil		
2026	Don Bosco †	Sumathi	Telugu		

=== Television ===
Year	Title	Role	Language	Platform	Notes	Ref.
2022	Anantham	Parvathy	Tamil	ZEE5		

=== Music video ===
Year	Title	Role	Composer	Singer	Notes
2025	18 Miles (Tharana)	Tharana	Siddhu Kumar	Anand Aravindakshan	
