= Ugram (film) =

Indian Telugu-language action thriller film

- Theatrical release poster
- Directed by: Vijay Kanakamedala
- Screenplay by: Vijay Kanakamedala
- Dialogues by: Abburi Ravi
- Story by: Toom Venkat
- Produced by: Sahu Garapati; Harish Peddi
- Starring: Allari Naresh; Mirnaa
- Cinematography: Siddharth J.
- Edited by: Chota K. Prasad
- Music by: Sricharan Pakala
- Production companies: Shine Screens; Anji Industeries
- Release date: 5 May 2023
- Running time: 148 minutes
- Country: India
- Language: Telugu

Ugram (transl. Furious/Anger) is a 2023 Indian Telugu-language neo-noir action thriller film directed by Vijay Kanakamedala from a story written by Toom Venkat. It stars Allari Naresh and Mirnaa in the lead roles. It marks the second collaboration of Naresh and Kanakamedala after Naandhi (2021). The music was composed by Sricharan Pakala with cinematography by Siddharth J and editing by Chota K. Prasad. It was loosely based on the 2019 psychological thriller, Fractured.

== Plot ==
In Hyderabad, CI K. Shiva Kumar lives an honest life with his wife Aparna and daughter Lucky, where he spends little time for his family but still cares about them. On Shiva's birthday, Aparna is visited by some four goons and gets harassed by them as Shiva arrested the goons for harassing girls at a hostel earlier. Enraged, Shiva finished the goons, which leads Aparna and Lucky to separate from him due to his aggressiveness as a police officer. Shiva agrees to drop Aparna back to her home. While travelling, Shiva, Aparna and Lucky get entangled in an accident. Shiva survives, but Aparna and Lucky get seriously injured, where he takes them to the hospital, but gets shocked as they were never admitted there.

Shiva does not believe this and makes a fight in the hospital, where he gets faded due to dementia. After eight days, he learns that Aparna and Lucky are missing and begins to find them despite his critical health condition. Shiva's friend Victor shows him that one of the goons, Gajendra alias Gani, actually survived. One of the police officers spots Gani and tells Victor, but Shiva finds Gani and a fight ensues between both of them, where Shiva kills Gani and gets arrested. However, Dr. Sunita tells the court to keep Shiva under house arrest for 14 days due to his health condition. Despite his health condition and house arrest, Shiva still investigates the missing cases of various people (including Aparna and Lucky), where he goes back to the place where the accident happened and finds some clues.

Shiva suspects that the missing people were kidnapped, which includes Aparna and Lucky. After looking at one of the clues, Victor tells Shiva that it could be the hijras, where he finds all the Hijras, but they tell that they were not behind it. Later, Shiva sees a group of men dressing as Hijras, where he follows them, but one of their leaders sees him following. Shiva chases after the leader, but the leader meets with a lorry accident. The officers pile up to spy on the dressed Hijras, where Shiva manages to take them to the police station. The dressed Hijiras tells them that they were kidnapping people and selling them for money, and were also used in illegal medical trials by the medical mafia.

It is revealed that Bhatia is actually the mastermind of the medical mafia as he was making artificial blood from the original blood, which would make him as a business magnate and also led him to kill many innocent people for making the artificial blood. Shiva goes to their hideout in the bag as a kidnapped person, where he disguises himself as the worker of the medics and finds Lucky, Aparna and other missing people. Enraged, Shiva attacks and brutally kills Bhatia's henchmen, where he kills Bhatia by throwing him into a flaming incinerator. After this, Patel apologizes to Shiva, and Aparna realizes the value of Shiva's job, where she and Lucky finally reunite with him and lead a happy life.

== Cast ==
- Allari Naresh as CI K. Shiva Kumar
- Mirnaa as Aparna, Shiva's wife
- Nawab Shah as Bhatia, the leader of the illegal medical mafia
- Indraja as Dr. Sunita
- Sharath Lohithaswa as Narasimhareddy Patel, Aparna's father
- Baby Uha Reddy as Lucky, Shiva's daughter
- Rupa Lakshmi as Aparna's mother
- Shatru as Victor, Shiva's colleague
- Srikanth Iyengar as CI Somnath
- Srinivas Sai as Ganjana alias Gani
- Manikanta Varanasi as Gangadhar
- Naga Mahesh as Police Officer
- Ramesh Reddy as Reddy
- Nithyasree Goru as Divya
- Nalla Sreedhar Reddy Gabbar as Advocate
- Koushik Mahata

== Production ==
Following the success of Naandhi, it was announced that Allari Naresh and Vijay Kanakamedala would team up for another film tentatively titled NareshVijay2 (intended to be Naresh and Kanakamedala's 2nd collaboration) under the production of Shine Screens. Kanakamedala wants to try how Naresh will be like when playing in a serious role. Naresh thought about it and agreed being in a serious role, so the entire team started shooting the film. In September 2022, the title was revealed to be Ugram (transl. Furious/Anger). Kanakamedala also wrote the screenplay, while Toom Venkat and Abburi Ravi wrote the story and dialogues. Siddharth J. was hired as the cinematographer. Later, Mirnaa Menon joined the cast and reportedly plays as Naresh's wife. Indraja was reported to play as a doctor who cares about Naresh's health condition. The film was shot in Hyderabad, Warangal, and Goa.

== Music ==
Ugram

Soundtrack album by Sricharan Pakala
- Released: 4 May 2023
- Recorded: 2023
- Genre: Feature film soundtrack
- Length: 10:54
- Language: Telugu
- Label: Junglee Music

Sricharan Pakala chronology
Itlu Maredumilli Prajaneekam (2022)	Ugram (2023)	Spy (2023)

Singles from Ugram
- 1. "Deveri" Released: 19 March 2023; 2. "Albela Albela" Released: 8 April 2023; 3. "Ugram Title Song" Released: 28 April 2023

The film score and soundtrack is composed by Sricharan Pakala. The audio rights were acquired by Junglee Music. The first single titled "Deveri" was released on 19 March 2023. The second single titled “Albela Albela" was released on 8 April 2023. The third single titled "Ugram Title Song" was released on 28 April 2023.

Track listing
No.	Title	Lyrics	Singer(s)	Length
1.	"Deveri"	Sri Mani	Anurag Kulkarni	4:09
2.	"Albela Albela"	Bhaskarabhatla	Revanth, Sravana Bhargavi	2:45
3.	"Ugram Title Song"	Chaithanya Prasad	Sricharan Pakala	3:56
Total length:				10:54

== Release ==
Ugram was initially going to release on 14 April 2023, but was postponed due to production delays. Later, it was announced that the film will release on 5 May 2023.

=== Home media ===
The digital rights were acquired by Amazon Prime Video and was premiered on 2 June 2023.

== Reception ==
=== Critical reception ===
Tamma Moksha of The Hindu wrote "Vijay Kanakamedala uses too many plot points, haphazard narrative breaks and unnecessary song sequences that dilute the intensity of the film".

Neeshita Nyayapati of The Times of India gave 3 out of 5 stars and wrote "Ugram is the kind of film you'll enjoy if you're looking for a decent thriller without too many expectations". Avinash Ramachandran of The New Indian Express wrote "Ugram doesn't do enough to sell us on the sentimentality. It only acts as a platform for Naresh to establish his serious actor credentials".
