= Blue Star (film) =

2024 film by S Jayakumar

- Theatrical release poster
- Directed by: S. Jayakumar
- Written by: S. Jayakumar; Tamizh Prabha
- Produced by: Pa. Ranjith; R. Ganesh Murthy; G. Soundarya
- Starring: Ashok Selvan; Shanthanu Bhagyaraj; Keerthi Pandian
- Cinematography: Thamizh A. Azhagan
- Edited by: Selva R. K.
- Music by: Govind Vasantha
- Production companies: Neelam Productions; Lemon Leaf Creation Pvt Ltd
- Distributed by: Sakthi Film Factory
- Release date: 24 January 2024
- Running time: 166 minutes
- Country: India
- Language: Tamil

Blue Star is a 2024 Indian Tamil-language sports drama film directed by S. Jayakumar in his directorial debut and jointly produced by Pa. Ranjith under his production banner Neelam Productions along with R. Ganesh Murthy and G. Soundarya under Lemon Leaf Creation Pvt Ltd. The film stars Ashok Selvan, Shanthanu Bhagyaraj and Keerthi Pandian, with Prithvi Rajan, Bagavathi Perumal, Elango Kumaravel and Lizzie Antony in supporting roles, and Saju Navodaya in an extended cameo. The film features music composed by Govind Vasantha with cinematography by Thamizh A Azhagan and editing by Selva R. K. It was released on 24 January 2024 to positive reviews from critics.

== Plot ==
Set in the 1990s, the film is based in Arakkonam and follows the rivalry between two groups belonging to different castes against the backdrop of cricket. The plot follows their transition from enemies to friends and the trope between the different teams, while addressing the sport's segregation and inequalities, explored when both the team captains are exposed to discrimination and segregation from another world of cricket.

Ranjith's team and Rajesh's team have a long-standing rivalry, Ranjith's team coming from the colony side of village lower caste and Rajesh's team consisting of the richer higher caste. Long back, Immanuel who used to be Blue Star's star player was about to win a match for Blue Star, a fight breaks out between the two teams in which Immanuel's leg is injured, and he becomes permanently disabled. Since then, the two teams are banned in the village from playing against each other.

Cut to the present, Ranjith is a carefree college going youth in love with Anandhi. He wants to get back at Rajesh's team and wants Blue Star to play and win a match against them to prove their superiority. Once they clash in the village ground over which team gets to play there first, subsequently playing a 3-ball match in which blue star wins. After the incident, both teams get hell bent on playing a match against each other to show their superiority. Rajesh influences his politician Uncle who speaks to the village elders and finally gets a match scheduled. Not to miss any chance of winning, Rajesh recruits some club players from the town cricket league who are professional players, to play the match against Blue Star. Subsequently, his team wins the match against Blue Star. Rajesh goes to the league players’ ground to pay back the money and tries his hand at batting in their ground. The league players who come from an even privileged background, who had been skeptical of Rajesh and his team and just came there and played for the money, humiliates him and their coach kicks him out of the ground. Immanuel, who is the ground staff of the league grounds, intervenes, but he too is assaulted by them. At this point, Ranjith intervenes and beats up the coach. Both Ranjith and Rajesh get arrested and later Rajesh's uncle gets him out on bail. Rajesh has a change of heart due to the turn of events and secretly helps to get Ranjith out also.

Immanuel unites both the teams to play together as one unit and play against the common enemy. They finally team up, overcome their differences and practice hard to reach the semifinal of the match. During the semi-final, the league players coach uses his influence to send another deadly team 11 Bullets to play against Blue Star, but Ranjith and Rajesh somehow manage to play against their star player Bullet Babu and reaches the finals. Finally, they win the match against the league players team, the game finally uniting the village people irrespective of their caste and background.

== Cast ==
- Ashok Selvan as Ranjith
- Shanthanu Bhagyaraj as Rajesh
- Prithvi Rajan as Sam
- Keerthi Pandian as Anandhi
- Bagavathi Perumal as Immanuel
- Elango Kumaravel as Ranjith's and Sam's father
- Lizzie Antony as Suseela, Ranjith's and Sam's mother
- T.N.Arun Balaji as Gopalan, Rajesh's uncle
- Dhivya Duraisamy as Thenmozhi
- Raghav Parthiban as Nandagopal
- Goutham Raj Csv
- Tarun Srinivas as Varun
- Mullai Arasi as Kaamatchi
- Saju Navodaya as Bullet Babu (cameo)

== Production ==
The film was announced on 15 August 2022 with the character of Ranjith based on Jayakumar's elder brother and Sam based on the director himself. Filming commenced in the same month, and concluded in January 2023. The first look and title were revealed on 20 May 2023.

== Music ==
Blue Star

Soundtrack album by Govind Vasantha
- Released: 2023
- Recorded: 2023
- Genre: Feature film soundtrack
- Language: Tamil
- Label: Think Music
- Producer: Govind Vasantha

Govind Vasantha chronology
Fight Club (2023)	Blue Star (2023)	Love Mouli (2024)

Singles from Blue Star
- 1. "Blue Star Anthem" Released: 20 May 2023; 2. "Railin Oligal" Released: 13 September 2023; 3. "Arakkonam Style" Released: 24 November 2023

The soundtrack was composed by Govind Vasantha. The first single "Blue Star Anthem was released on 20 May 2023. The second single "Railin Oligal" was released on 13 September 2023. The third single "Arakkonam Style" was released on 24 November 2023.

Track listing
No.	Title	Lyrics	Singer(s)	Length
1.	"Blue Star Anthem"	Arivu	Arivu	1:44
2.	"Railin Oligal"	Uma Devi	Pradeep Kumar, Shakthisree Gopalan	2:37
3.	"Arakkonam Style"	Arivu	Arivu, Gana Balachander	3:11
4.	"Railai Thallum Meghame"	Arivu, Govind Vasantha	Arivu, Govind Vasantha, Kareeshma	3:15
5.	"Yaar Nee"	Arivu, Govind Vasantha	Arivu, Govind Vasantha, Vedan	3:12
Total length:				14:04

== Release ==
=== Theatrical ===
The film was released on 24 January 2024, on the eve of Republic Day.

=== Home media ===
The film began streaming on Amazon Prime Video from 29 February 2024.

== Reception ==
Blue Star received positive critical reviews.

Bhuvanesh Chander of The Hindu wrote, "Starring Ashok Selvan and Shanthnu Bhagyaraj as two angsty youngsters from rival communities locking horns on and off the cricket ground, Blue Star is a serious film telling a grounded tale that, for over 160 minutes, immerses you into a world so real, so familiar and so imperfect, that nothing shakes you off its spell." Roopa Radhakrishnan of The Times of India rated the film 3/5 praising the performances of the cast, the direction and music. Akchayaa Rajkumar of The News Minute rated the film 3.5/5 and wrote, "Tamil cinema has seen a wave of anti-caste films over the past few years and almost all of them have explored the caste dynamics of and oppression enforced by intermediary castes on Dalits. Blue Star takes this one step forward and explores the discrimination doled out to both intermediary castes and Dalits by a privileged caste".
