= Azhagiya Periyavan =

Indian Tamil writer (born 1968)

Azhagiya Periyavan (born c. 1968, Peranambut, Vellore), pen name of C. Aravindan, a modern Tamil writer and journalist. He writes about Dalit issues.

Thagappan Kodi (Thagappan's Lineage) is his popular novel.

== Bibliography ==
- Thagappan Kodi (Thagappan's Lineage, 2001)
- Theettu (Ugly, 1998)
- Vetkam Ketta Nadu (Shameless Country, 2004)
- Azhagiya Periyavan Kathaigal (2003)
- Nerikatti (Pain, 2004)
- Nee Nigalnda Podu (When You Happened, 2000)
- Arubha Nanju (Invisible Poison, 2005)

== Filmography ==
- Thangalaan (2024) - Screenplay Writer
