= Fanny Emily Penny =

British novelist (1847–1939)

- Born: 29 December 1847; Covehithe
- Died: 22 December 1939 (aged 91); Ealing
- Alma mater: Bedford College; Queen's College
- Spouse(s): Frank Penny
- Parent(s): Emily Caroline Cobbold Farr

Fanny Emily Farr Penny (29 December 1847 – 22 December 1939) was a British novelist. She lived for twenty-four years in India and most of her forty-four novels are set there.

Fanny Emily Farr was born in 1847 in Covehithe, Suffolk, England, the daughter of the Rev. John Farr, rector in Gillingham, Norfolk, and Emily Caroline Cobbold Farr, daughter of brewer John Cobbold and poet Elizabeth Cobbold. She was educated at Queen's College and Bedford College in London. In 1877, she married the Rev. Frank Penny. The Rev. Penny was a chaplain for the Indian Ecclesiastical Establishment and she accompanied him to India, where they lived until his retirement in 1901. They retired to Ealing.

A number of her novels feature the clash between western and Indian culture, and while Penny favors her Christian British culture her depiction of Indian culture is not unsympathetic. The Outcaste (1912) features a Western-educated Christian Indian ostracized by Indian culture. A Mixed Marriage (1903) features an interracial marriage between an upper class white British woman, Lorina Carlyon, and a wealthy Indian Muslim aristocrat, Mir Yacoob. A number of her novels feature magical elements, such as divination and men changing into animals.

She also wrote several works of non-fiction, including Southern India (1914), featuring illustrations of a wide variety of Indian people by Lady Lawley.

Fanny Emily Penny died on 22 December 1939 in Ealing.

== Bibliography ==
- Fickle Fortune in Ceylon. Madras: Addison & Co., 1887
- Caste and Creed. 2 vol. London: F. V. White, 1890.
- The Romance of a Nautch Girl: A Novel. 1 vol. London: Swan Sonnenschein, 1898.
- A Forest Officer: Being Episodes in the Life of Jim Burns. 1 vol. London: Methuen, 1900.
- Fort St. George, Madras: A Short History of Our First Possession in India. London: Swan Sonnenschein, 1900.
- Dilys. London: Chatto and Windus, 1903.
- A Mixed Marriage. London: Methuen, 1903.
- The Sanyasi. London: Methuen, 1904.
- The Tea Planter. London: Chatto and Windus, 1906.
- The Inevitable Law. London: Chatto and Windus, 1907.
- Dark Corners. London: Chatto and Windus, 1908.
- On the Coromandel Coast. London: Smith Elder, 1908.
- The Unlucky Mark. London: Chatto and Windus, 1909.
- Sacrifice. London: Chatto and Windus, 1910.
- The Rajah. London: Chatto and Windus, 1911.
- The Outcaste. London: Chatto and Windus, 1912.
- The Malabar Magician. London: Chatto and Windus, 1912.
- Love in the Hills. London: Chatto and Windus, 1913.
- Southern India. Black, 1914.
- Love in a Palace. London: Chatto and Windus, 1915.
- Love by an Indian River. London: Chatto and Windus, 1916.
- A Love Tangle. London: Chatto and Windus, 1917.
- Missing. London: Chatto and Windus, 1917.
- A Love Offensive. London: Chatto and Windus, 1918.
- Desire and Delight. London: Chatto and Windus, 1919.
- Diamonds. London: Hodder and Stoughton, 1920.
- The Rajah's Daughter. London: Hodder and Stoughton, 1921.
- The Swami's Curse. London: Hodder and Stoughton, 1923.
- One of the Best. London: Hodder and Stoughton, 1923.
- Living Dangerously. London: Hodder and Stoughton, 1925.
- Pulling the Strings. London: Hodder and Stoughton, 1925.
- A Question of Colour. London: Hodder and Stoughton, 1926.
- A Question of Love. London: Hodder and Stoughton, 1928.
- The Two Brides. London: Hodder and Stoughton, 1929.
- The Wishing Stone. London: Hodder and Stoughton, 1930.
- Get on the Wooing. London: Hodder and Stoughton, 1931.
- The Lady of the Rifle. London: Hodder and Stoughton, 1932.
- Magic in the Air. London: Hodder and Stoughton, 1933.
- The Old Dagoba. London: Hodder and Stoughton, 1934.
- Patrick. London: Hodder and Stoughton, 1934.
- The Elusive Bachelor. London: Hutchinson, 1935.
- A Spell of the Devil. London: Hutchinson, 1935.
- The Familiar Stranger. London, Hutchinson, 1936.
- Chowra's Revenge. London: Hutchinson, 1937.
- Treasure, Love and Snakes. London: Mills and Boon, 1938.
- Jackals and Others. London: Mills and Boon, 1939.
