= Jishad Shamsudeen =

Indian fashion designer

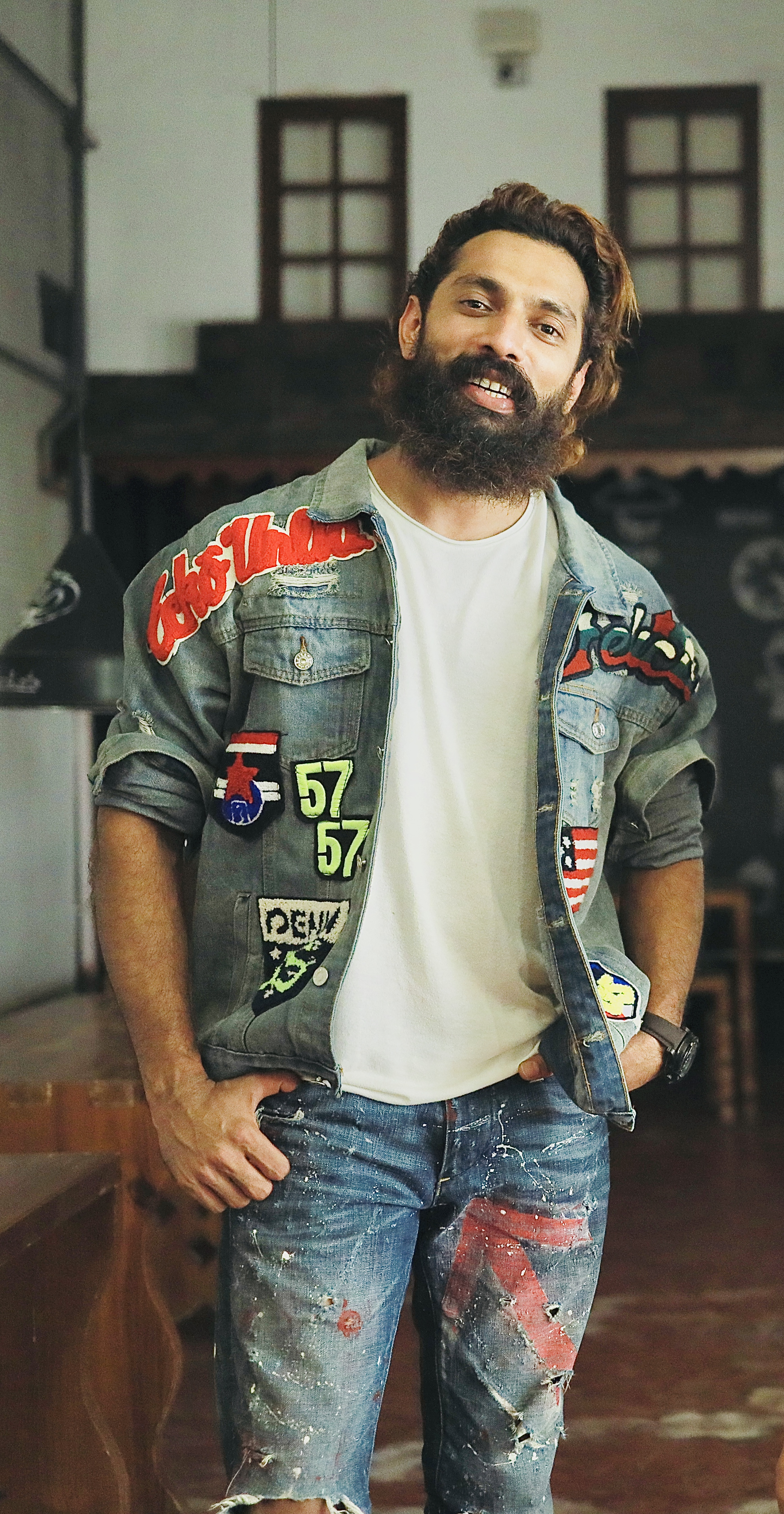
- Jishad Shamsudeen
- Born: Thrissur, Kerala, India
- Occupation: Fashion designer

Jishad Shamsudeen is an Indian fashion stylist / fashion designer from Thrissur, Kerala. He is specialised in designing customised Jean jacket. Currently, he is working as a personal designer stylist of Mohanlal. He is also associated with several stars in Bollywood and Indian Film Industry. Currently, he is residing in Kochi.

== Career ==
Jishad had worked with some of the top designers in Bengaluru and then moved to Dubai in 2016. There he was working with Splash fashions as a denim artist and a denim designer. He got an offer to design a denim jacket for Salman Khan in the movie Race 3 and got several appreciations and its featured in the song "Heeriye". He is currently associated with several upcoming movies in Malayalam.

Recently in the view of COVID-19, he designed a specialised wear for medical team and he is awaiting approvals for the same from the authority.
