= Sarpatta Parambarai =

2021 film by Pa. Ranjith

- Official release poster
- Directed by: Pa. Ranjith
- Written by: Pa. Ranjith; Tamizh Prabha
- Produced by: Shanmugam Dhakshanraj; Pa. Ranjith
- Starring: Arya; Dushara Vijayan; Pasupathy; John Kokken; Kalaiyarasan; Shabeer Kallarakkal; John Vijay; Santhosh Prathap; Anupama Kumar
- Cinematography: Murali G.
- Edited by: Selva R. K.
- Music by: Santhosh Narayanan
- Production companies: Neelam Productions; K9 Studios
- Distributed by: Amazon Prime Video
- Release date: 22 July 2021
- Running time: 174 minutes
- Country: India
- Language: Tamil

Sarpatta Parambarai (transl. Sarpatta Clan) (Note: The word Sarpatta really means "Four Patta Knives", and the word Paramparai means "Clan". It originates from Tamil word பரண் பரை means seventh generation parent In Tamil. In Urdu it is "چار پٹا" in Hindi it is चार + पट्टा, meaning – four Patta knives Clan, Which come from the older clan named Babu Bhai Paramparai. The other clan is "Idiyappa Parambarai" comes from the Tamil words இடி (transl. Thunder) + அப்பா (transl. father), meaning they hit like thunder, There other clan is "Ellappan Chettiar Paramparai".) is a 2021 Indian Tamil-language sports action drama film directed by Pa. Ranjith. It was produced by him under Neelam Productions and by Shanmugam Dhakshanaraj of K9 Studios. The film stars Arya, John Kokken, Shabeer Kallarakkal, Dushara Vijayan, Pasupathy, Anupama Kumar and Sanchana Natarajan. Set in the 1970s, it revolves around a clash between Idiyappa Parambarai and Sarpatta Parambarai, two clans in North Chennai, and also showcases the area's boxing culture and its related politics.

Filming was half completed by February 2020, when it was delayed due to the COVID-19 pandemic, with filming completed in September–December. Most filming took place in North Chennai. The cinematographer was Murali G., with music composed by Santhosh Narayanan and Seva R. K. was the editor.

Sarpatta Parambarai had been scheduled for a theatrical release which was cancelled due to the pandemic. It was instead released direct-to-streaming through Amazon Prime Video on 22 July 2021. It received critical acclaim with praise for the sports scenes, production design and characterisations. It appeared on several best Tamil-language film lists for 2021. The film won two Tamil Nadu State Film Awards: Best Actor (Arya) and Best Actor (Special Prize) for Pasupathy. A sequel began filming in 2026.

== Plot ==
In the early 1970s in North Madras (now called North Chennai), Kabilan is a Dalit labourer at the Madras Port. He aspires to become a prominent boxer like his father Munirathnam. His mother Bakkiyam forbids this, as Munirathnam's fighting prowess led him to be killed in an ambush by a rival gang, but Kabilan's Anglo-Indian godfather Kevin (nicknamed 'Daddy') secretly supports his boxing passion.

In 1975, when Indira Gandhi suspends political freedoms under The Emergency, a boxing tournament is hosted by Rangan, boxing coach of the Sarpatta clan and Dravida Munnetra Kazhagam (DMK) party-member. The Sarpatta clan's main boxer Meeran is defeated by Vembuli of the Idiyappan clan. Rangan declares that he will bring up a prominent boxer to defeat Vembuli at the next match, accepting the condition that the Sarpatta will never fight again if defeated. To the disapproval of his son Vetri, Rangan controversially chooses to train amateur boxer Raman, but is soon dissatisfied by Raman's progress. Hearing Raman insult the coach, Kabilan severely beats him.

Impressed by Kabilan's ability, Rangan decides to train him in Raman's place, though the Idiyappan clan scoffs at the idea of Kabilan as a challenge to Vembuli. After a heated debate, Daddy challenges 'Dancing Rose' – a respected retired boxer nicknamed for his legendary footwork – to fight Kabilan. The upcoming fight is frequently discussed and fans dismiss Kabilan as a "tomato can". (Note: Easily knocked over, resulting in blood pouring out.) There is an uproar when Kabilan defeats Rose, and an enraged Vembuli taunts Kabilan in advance of their match. Raman's uncle Thaniga plots against Kabilan for humiliating Raman, offering to help Vembuli if the match turns against him.

Kabilan dominates Vembuli most of the match and almost knocks him out in the fourth round. The final round is suddenly stopped by the police who come to arrest Rangan, as the DMK government has been dismissed and arrest orders issued for all prominent DMK leaders. The crowd refuses to move until the match ends, forcing the police to wait. As Kabilan is about to give the final blow to the tired and hopeless Vembuli, Thaniga's henchmen interrupt the match by attacking Kabilan and the spectators, stripping Kabilan naked, and forcing the match to end with no winner. Rangan and other party members are immediately imprisoned under the Maintenance of Internal Security Act (MISA).

Kabilan recovers from an injury to the back of the head and decides to quit boxing and live a modest life with Bakkiyam and his wife Mariyamma. Kabilan and Vetri decide to visit Rangan in prison, but they happen to encounter Thaniga who provokes Kabilan. In a fit of rage, Kabilan attacks Thaniga with a sword and is imprisoned for six months.

In 1978, Kabilan is working with Vetri to brew liquor. Their undertaking is initially illegal but Vetri uses his connections as a member of Tamil Nadu's ruling All India Anna Dravida Munnetra Kazhagam (AIADMK) party to legitimize the business and grow rich while employing Kabilan as a henchman. Kabilan becomes an alcoholic, straining his relationships with his mother and his wife. Released from prison in 1979, Rangan is disturbed by how Kabilan has changed.

Kabilan watches as Raman is thoroughly defeated by Vembuli in a boxing match. Afterwards, Kabilan, supported by Daddy, challenges Vembuli to a rematch due to the disruption of their earlier match. Embarrassed, Vembuli accepts. Rangan wants to substitute another boxer because of Kabilan's lack of fitness, and Vetri tries to dissuade Kabilan by offering him a better position in his business, but Kabilan angrily insists on fighting.

Kabilan laments his personal and boxing failures to Bakkiyam. She reassures him and encourages him to redeem himself through boxing, explaining that she had discouraged him earlier because she didn't want him to become a thug. The next day, Daddy sends Kabilan to train under Munirathnam's friend and former Sarpatta boxer, 'Beedi' Rayappan. Kabilan regains his fitness and improves his technique. In the match, Vembuli dominates the early rounds and dislocates Kabilan's left shoulder, but with encouragement from Rangan, Vetri, Meeran, and other Sarpatta members, Kabilan knocks out Vembuli in the final round. After years of failures, the Sarpatta clan achieves its prime-match victory.

== Cast ==
- Arya as Kabilan Munirathnam
- Dushara Vijayan as Mariyamma, Kabilan's wife
- Pasupathy as Rangan Vaathiyar, Kabilan's coach
- John Vijay as Kevin 'Daddy', an Anglo-Indian, Kabilan's godfather and his father's friend
- Vettai Muthukumar as Thaniga, Raman's uncle
- Kalaiyarasan as "Vetri" Vetriselvan, Rangan's son
- John Kokken as Vembuli
- Anupama Kumar as Bakkiyam, Kabilan's mother
- Shabeer Kallarakkal as 'Dancing' Rose
- Santhosh Prathap as Raman
- G. M. Sundar as Duraikannu Vaathiyar, Vembuli's boxing coach
- Kaali Venkat as Koni Chandran
- Sai Tamil as Meeran
- Sanchana Natarajan as Lakshmi, Vetri's wife
- Priyadarshini Rajkumar as Missiamma, Kevin's wife
- Geetha Kailasam as Rangan's wife
- Thangadurai as Thangam, boxing announcer
- Maran as Maanja Kannan
- Saravana Vel as Gauthaman, Kabilan's friend
- Gajapathy as Beedi Raayappan
- Kishore as Munirathnam, Kabilan's father
- Supergood Subramani

== Production ==
=== Development ===
In July 2019, it was reported that Arya would star in a film to be directed by Pa. Ranjith, based on boxing. Arya confirmed the project in February. While there were early reports that the film was titled Salpetta Parambarai, the film was announced to be titled Sarpatta Parambarai on 2 December 2020. Tamil Prabha serves as co-writer. The film was produced by Ranjith under Neelam Productions in association with K9 Studios. The technical crew includes cinematographer Murali G. and editor Selva R. K.

=== Casting ===
When we had a workshop, he had people from the 1970s coming in to tell us how boxing was at those times and how they prepared. Extensive research has gone into the making of the film; the way we speak, the body language, the costumes, art department, are all reflective of that.

— Arya, on the casting and characterisation of the actors in the film

To portray a boxer, Arya underwent six hours of daily training for seven months, with a combination of cardio, boxing and regular gym. As a result, he shed his weight in order to obtain a lean and "ripped" physique. His look from the film was revealed in February 2020. In September 2019, Attakathi Dinesh and Kalaiyarasan who were part of Ranjith's previous films were reported to be a part of the project, as was Magizh Thirumeni. But neither Dinesh nor Magizh were signed to the project. In March 2020, Santhosh Prathap was announced to portray a pivotal role in the film. The same month, debutante Dushara Vijayan was announced as the leading lady for the film.

During September 2020, John Kokken announced being a part of the cast and worked intensively for the role. Sanchana Natarajan was announced to be an integral part of the film, whose character name was revealed to be Lakshmi. Anupama Kumar played the role of Bakkiyam, whom she described as "loud", "emotional", "fiery" and "lovable". On 28 March 2021, Ranjith released a special video introducing the characters of the film which is about the fitness and sports training of the male actors, as well as featuring snippets from the acting workshop, which featured the actors and the supporting artists. Further revealing the character names, it was also revealed that Kaali Venkat, Pasupathy, John Vijay and Shabeer Kallarakkal were playing pivotal roles in the film, the latter as Dancing Rose. Maran played a supporting role as Maanja Kannan before his death in May 2021.

=== Characters ===
Pa. Ranjith drew inspiration from prominent historical boxers for the characters of the film. Arya's character Kabilan was inspired by American boxer Muhammad Ali, and a promotional image was staged to resemble that from a film about Ali. Vembuli was modelled on Mike Tyson. The character 'Dancing' Rose was inspired by Naseem Hamed, who was known for his fluidic movement that almost mimics a dance form. Raman was based on George Foreman, one of the oldest heavyweight champions in international boxing. The character 'Beedi' Rayappan was inspired by Kitheri Muthu, a fisherman-boxer, who was known for defeating Nat Terry. Inspired by Muthu's prowess, "Periyar" E. V. Ramaswamy, the social activist and the founder of Dravidar Kazhagam, bestowed the title of 'Dravida Veeran' (The Dravidian braveheart) to Muthu.

=== Filming ===
Principal photography was reported have started in November 2019. By February 2020, filming was 50% complete. It was later suspended due to the COVID-19 pandemic and subsequent government-induced lockdown. Despite reports that filming would resume on 15 September 2020, it did so on 18 September. The shooting of the film was mostly set in and around North Chennai. Principal photography wrapped in mid-December 2020.

=== Music ===
Santhosh Narayanan composed the soundtrack and film's score for the film; It marked the composer's fifth consecutive and final film with Pa. Ranjith, since his and the director's debut film Attakathi (2012). The theme song "Neeye Oli" was originally created by Shan Vincent de Paul for Made in Jaffna (2021) who had written and performed the rap portions with co-singers Navz-47 and Narayanan himself, and lyrics written by Arivu. It was released as a single on 30 June 2021. The second song "Vambula Thumbula" sung by sung by Santhosh, Gana Muthu, Isaivani and Gana Ulagam Dharani, was released on 21 July 2021. The soundtrack to the film was released on 28 July 2021 to critical acclaim.

== Themes and analysis ==
The film is mostly based on the lives of boxers based in North Chennai, where the boxing culture of "parambarai" clans are groups with "fanatical pride and honour" which include ranked athletes, revered coaches, political supporters and immense fanbases. The political ideologies are absent Ranjith's previous films Madras, Kabali and Kaala, which focus on the life of the lower-class people and caste system in Hinduism. It includes references to Ambedkarism, Self-Respect Movement and Buddhism, as Ranjith is an ardent follower of the ideologies of B. R. Ambedkar and it was translated in his films to propose the subject of Dalit colossus. In one scene, the film shows the Indian Republic Party (IRP), rooted from Ambedkar's Scheduled Castes Federation.

Harish Wankhede in his critical review in The Hindu argues that Kabilan, though not significantly different stands distinctly from Ranjith's earlier masculine Dalit heroes. We see Kabilan first as a spectator of a boxing match, then becoming an underdog boxer and, by overcoming the traditional social obstacles, the ultimate champion of the sport. Sarpatta "thus escapes the typical social burden of the Dalit hero [and places him] as a young sportsperson who plays the game with dedication and grit". Wankhede judges this a promising move towards breaking the Dalit hero's fantasies for machoism, violence and revenge.

Sarpatta Paramabarai is set in the 1970s and to reflect the era, political incidents such as The Emergency, imposed by the then Prime Minister of India, Indira Gandhi during 1975–77 and its opposition Dravida Munnetra Kazhagam (DMK) in Tamil Nadu, then followed by the splitting of the party into two, the latter as All India Anna Dravida Munnetra Kazhagam (AIADMK) by M. G. Ramachandran was portrayed in the film in order to be "realistic". Ranjith told Press Trust of India, "We had to properly handle these political aspects in minute proportions in the movie though the film is not based on Emergency, which serves only as a political backdrop". He added that the boxing culture in India was present in North Madras from pre-Independence times and after India's Independence, the culture has been split into diverse clans. Sarpatta Parambarai also focused on the ground realities of the working-class people.

The film also shows the DMK government being dismissed by the central government in January 1976, over its stand against emergency, and real footages of the arrests of the party members, including politician M. Karunanidhi's son, M. K. Stalin, during the Maintenance of Internal Security (MISA) Act was shown in the film. As a result, there were difficulties in organising boxing matches and the boxers and kabaddi players turned into mercenaries, following lack of employment. Bhagath Veera Arun, a researcher from North Chennai said that "Though boxers hailed from many communities, boxers from the fishing community were dominant in Sarpatta Parambarai, whose epicentre was Panaimara Thotti, a place in Royapuram".

== Release ==
Sarpatta Parambarai was initially scheduled for a theatrical release but was later decided for a direct-to-streaming release through Amazon Prime Video due to COVID-19-related cinema closures. The broadcast rights of the film were acquired by Kalaignar TV. Amazon Prime Video India scheduled Sarpatta Parambarai for release on 22 July 2021. It was released alongside a version dubbed into Telugu and released as Sarpatta Parampara. In 2024, it was dubbed in Hindi as Sarpatta The Warrior.

== Reception ==
=== Streaming ratings ===
Sarpatta Parambarai became the most-watched Tamil film of the year on Amazon Prime Video, and became the second-most watched regional film on the streaming service, only bested by Soorarai Pottru (2020). Many celebrities, such as directors and actors among the Tamil film fraternity, praised the film through social media. A report said that the film had been watched over multiple households living across 3,200 towns and cities in India, and was further streamed in more than 150 countries and territories across the world. An image featuring Kabilan (Arya) and Rangan Vaathiyar (Pasupathy), was widely parodied by netizens and used in internet memes.

=== Critical response ===
M. Suganth of The Times of India, rated the film 3.5 out of 5 stars and praised the casting and production design for recreating the setting. He noted that the "social and political undertones" provide a parallel secondary plot "of a community which has to fight ... to reclaim its rights". Sowmya Rajendran of The News Minute gave 3.5 out of 5 stars and wrote "Sarpatta Parambarai is like watching a live match ― it brings the heat of the sport, the excitement of each move, and most of all, the glorious unpredictability of sport". Srinivasa Ramanujam of The Hindu praised Pa. Ranjith for the setting of North Madras in the 1970s, and further said that "the incorporating of elements such as caste conflict and the question of pride into the sporting milleu makes the film an engaging watch".

Saibal Chatterjee of NDTV wrote that the film enlivens the historical era and its culture, with the script, sound and production lifting the formulaic genre story toward an "enlightening period chronicle". Giving the film a score of 3.5 stars (out of 5), Manoj Kumar R. of The Indian Express wrote that through its attempts at authenticity it takes the "first baby steps" toward improving a dismal genre in Tamil cinema.

Sify called the film a "comeback film" for both Ranjith and Arya. Nandini Ramanath of Scroll.in wrote that Ranjith's screenplay attempts to infuse an average boxing drama with the "identity politics and political dynamics of the era" but it is the sports action and characterisations that persist through the three-hour movie. Haricharan Pudipeddi of Hindustan Times considered Sarpatta Parambarai a candidate for best film of the year, and "marked Ranjith's return to form" by avoiding overt discussion of oppression and discrimination, which had proved controversial in his previous films, and instead working these into the backstory. Ranjini Krishnakumar of Firstpost gave 4 out of 5 stars and noted Ranjith's "complete control ... as storyteller and anthropologist".

Prahlad Srihari of The Quint gave the film 2 out of 5 stars and found its execution of a formulaic underdog story to be underwhelming. Gauthaman Bhaskaran of News18 felt that the overdramatic elements of the secondary plot resulted in a weaker central plot "in the mistaken belief ... that the ticket-paying masses want 'wholesome entertainment', which does not quite work in these times." Sudhir Srinivasan of Cinema Express wrote "With this film, Ranjith continues to jab at Indian mythology, while throwing strong punches at anyone who doesn't stand for equality". Baradwaj Rangan wrote, "It's rare to find a film where everyone, including the director, is at the top of their game."

The film was listed as one of the "best Tamil films of 2021" according to The Indian Express, The News Minute, Hindustan Times, Firstpost, and India Today. According to the social networking site Letterboxd, it also secured the 14th position in the "highest rated International films of 2021". The New York Times listed it as one of "the five best International films to stream on digital platforms". Raj Shinde, critic-based at the Indian news website ThePrint, cited Sarpatta Parambarai an example on "how Indian film industry being evolved with anti-caste films in 2021".

=== Accolades ===
Award	Category	Recipient(s) and nominee(s)	Result	Ref.
Critics Choice Film Awards	Best Film	K9 Productions, Neelam Productions	Nominated	
Critics Choice Film Awards	Best Director	Pa. Ranjith	Nominated	
Critics Choice Film Awards	Best Supporting Actor	Pasupathy	Nominated	
Critics Choice Film Awards	Best Writing	Pa. Ranjith, Tamizh Prabha	Nominated	
Critics Choice Film Awards	Best Editing	Selva R. K.	Nominated	
Critics Choice Film Awards	Best Cinematography	Murali G.	Nominated	
Tamil Nadu State Film Awards	Best Actor	Arya	Won	
Tamil Nadu State Film Awards	Best Actor (Special Prize)	Pasupathy	Won	
OTTplay Awards	Best Actor Male (Jury)	Arya	Won	

=== Controversies ===
In 1980, M. G. Ramachandran brought Muhammad Ali to Chennai in order to raise funds for the Tamil Nadu Amateur Boxing Association. This was not shown in the film and former AIADMK Tamil Nadu fisheries minister D. Jayakumar criticised Ranjith for portraying Ramachandran in a poor light. He noted the initiatives introduced by Ramachandran to help underprivileged people compete in international sports events, while also inspiring the masses with his athleticism during his acting career: "many of his fans took up sports". Jayakumar further called the film a "DMK propaganda film" and noted Ranjith had criticised the DMK in the past. One of the kins of boxer Kitheri Muthu noted the inaccuracies in the film; it had few dialogues spoken by Arya, that a student of Rangan Vaathiyar defeated Nat Terry in the film, but Kitheri Muthu, who was the first boxer of Sarpatta Parambarai in 1940s, defeated Terry.

== Sequel ==
A sequel was announced in March 2023, which was tentatively titled as Sarpatta Parambarai: Round 2 with Ranjith returning to direction and Arya reprising his role as Kabilan Munirathnam. It began filming on 23 September 2026.

== See also ==
- Bhooloham, a 2015 Tamil-language film, also features the boxing rivalry of North Chennai
- List of boxing films
