= Exam (TV series) =

- Genre: Crime thriller
- Created by: Pushkar–Gayathri
- Screenplay by: A. Sarkunam
- Directed by: A. Sarkunam
- Starring: Dushara Vijayan; Aditi Balan; Abbas
- Music by: Sam C. S.
- Country of origin: India
- Original language: Tamil
- No. of seasons: 1
- No. of episodes: 7

Production
- Executive producer: Pushkar-Gayathri
- Producers: S. Guhapriya; S. Nandakumar; Gowtham Selvaraj
- Cinematography: Arun Amarenthiran
- Editor: A. Richard Kevin
- Production company: Wallwatcher Films

Original release
- Network: Amazon Prime Video
- Release: 15 May 2026

Exam is a 2026 Indian Tamil-language Crime thriller streaming television series created by Pushkar–Gayathri for Amazon Prime Video written and directed by A. Sarkunam. The show is about a young woman who carries a mysterious past and focuses on ambition, morality, and the consequences of systemic injustice.

The principal cast of the series includes Dushara Vijayan, Aditi Balan, Abbas and Akash Venkatesan. It premiered on 15 May 2026 and consists of seven episodes.

== Cast ==
- Dushara Vijayan as Jhansi
- Aditi Balan as DSP V. Maramalli
- Abbas as Jayachandran
- Vasundhara Kashyap as older Saranya (special appearance)
- Akash Venkatesan as Manikandan
- Sooriya Jeya as Young Kumaresan
- Kumar as Inspector Elangovan
- Sanjeevee Govindasamy as Maarimuthu
- Saravana Sakthi as Constable Shakthivel
- Aana Chris as Maramalli's Daughter
- N. Arunmozhithevan as Inspector Sekaran
- Christina Mary as Srinidhi
- Durai Sudhakar as Sub-Inspector Chezhiyan
- Sharmila as Maramalli's Mother
- SRS Manoj as Maami
- Akshathaa Ajit as Young Saranya
- JK as Reporter Akash
- Kawin as RPSO secretary Durairaji
- Meenal as Vimala

== Episodes ==
No.	Title	Directed by	Written by	Original release date
1	"Two-Headed Serpent"	A. Sarkunam	A. Sarkunam	15 May 2026
2	"The Path to the Unknown Destiny"	A. Sarkunam	A. Sarkunam	15 May 2026
3	"The Faceless Shadow"	A. Sarkunam	A. Sarkunam	15 May 2026
4	"The Strangled Voice"	A. Sarkunam	A. Sarkunam	15 May 2026
5	"Come Forth, O Sword-Bearer"	A. Sarkunam	A. Sarkunam	15 May 2026
6	"The Fury of the Red Tea"	A. Sarkunam	A. Sarkunam	15 May 2026
7	"The Fish That Hunted for the Duck"	A. Sarkunam	A. Sarkunam	15 May 2026

== Development ==
=== Production ===
The series is Pushkar–Gayathri`s third collaboration with Amazon Prime Video, after Suzhal: The Vortex (2022–2025) and Vadhandhi: The Fable of Velonie (2022). The series is directed by National Film Awards winner A. Sarkunam, making his debut in a limited series.

=== Casting ===
Actresses, Dushara Vijayan and Aditi Balan was cast as police officer Jhansi and Maramalli. Tamil film actor Abbas cast as Jayachandran. This is his debut role in a limited series.

== Release ==
Amazon Prime Video released the series' first teaser on 19 March 2026. On 30 April, it was released in a trailer and revealed the release date. Exam premiered on the platform two weeks later, on 15 May and the series will be released in Tamil and dubbed in Telugu, Hindi, Malayalam, and Kannada languages.
