= Thaa =

Thaa may refer to:

- Ṯāʾ, third letter of the modern Arabic alphabet
- Tha (film), an Indian film
- Thaa Atoll, an administrative division of the Maldives
- Tāna (character), the 13th consonant of the Thaana abugaida used in Dhivehi
- Thaana (ISO 15924 code)
