= Sanjana Krishnamoorthy =

Indian actress

- Born: 8 November 2000 (age 25); Tamil Nadu, India
- Education: M.O.P. Vaishnav College for Women
- Occupations: Actor; Assistant director
- Years active: 2021–present
- Notable work: Vadhandhi: The Fable of Velonie; Lubber Pandhu; Parimala and Co

Sanjana Krishnamoorthy is an Indian actress, who predominantly works in Tamil-language series and films, who rose to fame with the crime thriller series Vadhandhi: The Fable of Velonie (2022) and the sports drama film Lubber Pandhu (2024). Later, Sanjana assisted Mani Ratnam in his 2025 film, Thug Life.

== Career ==
After completing her degree in Visual Communication in M.O.P. Vaishnav College for Women, Sanjana began her career in a YouTube-page named Awesome Machi as a Graphic designer and also starred in a few videos. Later she received a call for an audition from Pushkar and Gayatri's production company, Wallwatcher Films for the Amazon Prime Video web series Vadhandhi: The Fable of Velonie (2022) and got selected. In 2024, she appeared one of the female leads in the sports drama film Lubber Pandhu (2024) opposite to Harish Kalyan, with the movie garnering widespread acclaim and praise for her performance. Later, Sanjana has been assisting Mani Ratnam in his film, Thug Life, starring Kamal Haasan and Silambarasan.

== Filmography ==
=== Films ===
- All films are in Tamil, unless otherwise noted.

Year	Title	Role	Notes	Ref.
2024	Lubber Pandhu	Durga	Nominated - Ananda Vikatan Cinema Awards for Best Debut Actress	
2025	Thug Life	Mangai Shakthivel	Also assistant director	
2026	Parimala and Co	Parasakthi		
2026	DC	Parvathy		

=== Television ===
Year	Title	Role	Notes	Ref.
2021	I Hate You I Love You: Chapter-5 : Password	Pallavi		
2022	Vadhandhi: The Fable of Velonie	Velonie		

=== Music video ===
Year	Title	Role	Notes	Ref.
2024	Kaadhal Alaipayuthey	Sanjana		
