= Vadhandhi season 2 =

2026 Indian TV series

- Genre: Mystery; Crime thriller
- Created by: Andrew Louis
- Written by: Andrew Louis
- Directed by: Andrew Louis
- Starring: M. Sasikumar; Yashwanth; Anagha; Aparna Das; Vivek Prasanna; Revathy Sharma; Arjun Nandhakumar
- Music by: Simon K. King
- Country of origin: India
- Original language: Tamil
- No. of seasons: 1
- No. of episodes: 8

Production
- Executive producer: Pushkar–Gayathri
- Producer: S. Guhapriya; S. Nandakumar; Gowtham Selvaraj
- Running time: 40-50 minutes
- Production company: Wallwatcher Films

Original release
- Network: Amazon Prime Video
- Release: 7 August 2026

Related
- Vadhandhi: The Fable of Velonie

Vadhandhi: The Mystery of Mani is a 2026 Indian Tamil-language mystery crime thriller streaming television series created, written and directed by Andrew Louis for Amazon Prime Video. It is the second installment of the Amazon Prime's Vadhandhi franchise. The show was produced by S. Guhapriya, S. Nandakumar, and Gowtham Selvaraj under the Wallwatcher Films banner and creatively produced by Pushkar–Gayathri.

The principal cast of the series includes M. Sasikumar, Yashwanth, Anagha, Aparna Das, Vivek Prasanna, Revathy Sharma and Arjun Nandhakumar. The series premiered on Amazon Prime Video on 7 August 2026 and consists of eight episodes.

== Plot ==
The series revolves around a police officer, SI Moosa Raaza, who is transferred to Madurai for his punishment. There, he solves a false political case. But he realizes that his success may have sent an innocent man to life imprisonment. He is drawn back into a tangled web of buried secrets.

== Cast ==
- M. Sasikumar as SI Moosa Raaza
- Yashwanth as Mani
- Anagha as SP Rathika Nair IPS
- Aparna Das as Sumayya; Moosa's wife
- Vivek Prasanna as Ramar
- Revathy Sarma as Nilavathi
- Arjun Nandhakumar as Sukumaran Nair (Rathika's Husband)
- Rajkumar as Neelagandan
- Chetan as Doctor Dhanapal
- Deepikka Anand as Venba, Mani's Sister
- Varshini Karmegham as Poorni
- Arjun Chakkravarthy as Sundaresan
- Vasanth Kannan as Prabhakaran
- Geethi Sangeetha as Sundaresan's Mother
- George Vijay as Constable Mohan

== Development ==
=== Production ===
The series was announced as a part of Amazon Prime Video's future slate of content in March 2026. The show is the second season of 2022's Vadhandhi: The Fable of Velonie with a different cast and story. Produced by S Guhapriya, S Nandakumar, and Gowtham Selvaraj under the Wallwatcher Films banner. Creative produced by Pushkar–Gayathri, who produced in the first season. The same director, Andrew Louis, who directed the first season, has returned to write and direct this season.

=== Casting ===
On March 2025, Tamil film director and actor, M. Sasikumar was cast as police officer SI Moosa Raaza. This is his second role in a limited series after Nadu Center (2025). Actress Anagha and Aparna Das are playing important role. Actor Vivek Prasanna reprises his role from Vadhandhi: The Fable of Velonie.

== Release ==
Amazon Prime Video released the series' first teaser on 19 March 2026. The series premiered on 7 August 2026, with all eight episodes released simultaneously. It was released in Tamil and dubbed in Telugu, Hindi, Malayalam, and Kannada.
