= Vadhandhi: The Fable of Velonie =

- Genre: Mystery; Crime thriller
- Written by: Andrew Louis
- Directed by: Andrew Louis
- Starring: S. J. Suryah; Sanjana Krishnamoorthy; Laila; Nassar; Vivek Prasanna
- Music by: Simon K. King
- Country of origin: India
- Original language: Tamil
- No. of seasons: 2
- No. of episodes: 16

Production
- Executive producer: Gowtham Selvaraj
- Producer: Pushkar–Gayathri
- Cinematography: Saravanan Ramasamy
- Editor: A. Richard Kevin
- Running time: 40-50 minutes

Original release
- Network: Amazon Prime Video; Kalaignar TV (syndication)
- Release: 2 December 2022

Related
- Vadhandhi: The Mystery of Mani

Vadhandhi: The Fable of Velonie (transl. Rumour: The Fable of Velonie) is a 2022 Indian-Tamil-language mystery crime thriller television series created by Andrew Louis, of Leelai and Kolaigaran fame, for Amazon Prime Video. It was directed and written by Andrew Louis. The principal cast of the series includes S. J. Suryah, Sanjana Krishnamoorthy, Laila, Nassar, Smruthi Venkat, Vivek Prasanna, Kumaran Thangarajan, Vaibhav Murugesan, Vikky Aadithya and Hareesh Peradi. It premiered on 2 December 2022 and consists of eight episodes.

The second season premiered on Amazon Prime Video on 7 August 2026, and consists of eight episodes.

== Cast ==
- S. J. Suryah as SI Vivek
- Sanjana Krishnamoorthy as Velonie
- Laila as Ruby, Velonie's mother
- Nassar as KI Sebastian
- Vivek Prasanna as SI V. Ramar
- Vaibhav Murugesan as Jones Durai, Lodge Manager
- Pradeep Krishnamoorthy as Valan
- Smruthi Venkat as Anandhi Vivek, Vivek's wife
- Avinash Raghudevan as Sanjeev
- Ashwin Kkumar as Santhosh
- Vikky Aadithya as Sunny
  - Videsh Anand as young Sunny
- C. Sujatha as Rani
- Hareesh Peradi as Sethuraman, editor of "The Fourth Column"
- Kumaran Thangarajan as Vignesh, Velonie's fiancée
- Aruvi Balaji as Alex
- Mahesh G as Amalraj
- Kulappulli Leela as Old Lady
- Kavin Jay Babu as Paulraj
- Ashwin Raam as Tony
- Ashiq Rahman as Director Shakthi
- M. Meeran Mitheen as SP
- Pranika Dhakshu as PC Mallika
- Mrithun Jayan as Suspect 1 in the lodge entry list
- Saranya Ravi as a prostitute

== Episodes ==
=== Season 1 (2022) ===
No.	Title	Directed by	Written by	Original release date
1	"The Dead Star"	Andrew Louis	Andrew Louis	2 December 2022
2	"Vivek Takes Charge"	Andrew Louis	Andrew Louis	2 December 2022
3	"Brothers in Crime"	Andrew Louis	Andrew Louis	2 December 2022
4	"Closed, but Unresolved"	Andrew Louis	Andrew Louis	2 December 2022
5	"An Intellectual Killer"	Andrew Louis	Andrew Louis	2 December 2022
6	"From Bad to Worse"	Andrew Louis	Andrew Louis	2 December 2022
7	"A Fictitious Fact"	Andrew Louis	Andrew Louis	2 December 2022
8	"The Vadhandhi Continues"	Andrew Louis	Andrew Louis	2 December 2022

== Development ==
=== Production ===
The series is Pushkar–Gayathri`s second collaboration with Amazon Prime Video. Earlier, the filmmaker duo had created the investigative thriller, Suzhal: The Vortex, for the streaming giant. The series is directed by Andrew Louis.

The Series was Renewed for another season & began filming with M. Sasikumar in the lead role & the entire shooting was wrapped 27 September 2025.

=== Casting ===
Tamil film director and actor, S. J. Suryah was cast as police officer Vivek. This is his debut role in a limited series. Sanjana Krishnamoorthy was cast as Velonie, actress Laila was cast as Ruby, making their debut with the series. Besides Nassar, Sanjana Krishnamoorthy, Smruthi Venkat, Vivek Prasanna, Kumaran Thangarajan, Vaibhav Murugesan, Vikky Aadithya and Hareesh Peradi were cast then.

=== Release ===
It was announced on Thursday 17 November that the series will be released in Tamil and dubbed in Telugu, Hindi, Malayalam and Kannada and will make its streaming debut on 2 December, on Amazon Prime Video. And also was Release the first look poster, The poster features a visibly shocked S. J. Suryah looking at a person lying dead in a field. The series was highly inspired by the American TV Series The Killing. The Murder mystery of Rosie Larson.

== Home media ==
The satellite rights was purchased by Kalaignar TV and aired the web series as a special movie presentation on January 13, 14 and 15, 2026.

== Reception ==
Upon release, the story and performances of SJ Suryah & Sanjana Krishnamoorthy were appreciated but the pacing was criticized. Haricharan Pudipeddi of Hindustan Times "The small-town set up helps in making the narrative quite interesting as the story presents us with multiple suspects and this naturally piques the excitement of a viewer."
