= Noodles (film) =

- Theatrical release poster
- Directed by: Madhankumar Dhakshinamoorthy
- Written by: Madhankumar Dhakshinamoorthy
- Produced by: Pragna Arun Prakesh
- Starring: Harish Uthaman; Sheela Rajkumar; Madhankumar Dhakshinamoorthy; Thirunavukkarasu; Aazhiya Senthilkumar; Vasant Marimuthu
- Cinematography: Vinoth Raja
- Edited by: Sarathkumar Kaleeswaran
- Music by: Robert Sargunam
- Production company: Rolling Sound Pictures
- Distributed by: V House Productions
- Release date: 8 September 2023
- Country: India

Noodles is a 2023 Indian Tamil-language thriller film written and directed by Madhankumar Dhakshinamoorthy and produced by Pragna Arun Prakesh. The film features Harish Uthaman, Sheela Rajkumar, Madhankumar Dhakshinamoorthy, Thirunavukkarasu, Aazhiya Senthilkumar, and Vasant Marimuthu. The same director remade the film in Telugu as Show Time (2025).

== Plot ==
A joyous moment in the neighborhood goes awry on a chance confrontation and doubles up the protagonist's woes in a freak accident. Noodles is a drama filled with suspense, thrill, humor, and loads of entertainment for the family.

== Cast ==
- Harish Uthaman as Saravanan
- Sheela Rajkumar as Sakthi
- Madhankumar Dhakshinamoorthy as Inspector Elango
- Thirunavukkarasu as Shankar
- Vasant Marimuthu as Lawyer Thirunavukkarasu
- Aazhiya Senthilkumar as Priya
- Baby Aazhiya as Priyu
- K. Miller Elamaran as Head Constable
- Pari Elavazhagan as Mobile Thief
- Sakthivel as Sakthi's father
- Kalavathi as Sakthi's mother
- Jayashree Senthil as Sakthi's sister
- Sathish Selvaraj as Neighbor
- Raja Appasamy as Shopkeeper
- Nahunaa as Meera
- Imthias Mohammed as Automan
- Uma Shankar Dhanapal as Cook
- Haritha as Jayanthi
- Subbalakshmi as Swetha
- Rathina Prakash as Prakash
- Sakthi as Ashwin
- Suraj as Yeshwanth
- Kuralarasan as Paperboy
- Nagaraj as Milkman
- Lakshmi as Auto Passenger
- Vishnu as Auto Passenger

== Production ==
The film noted debuted director Madhankumar Dhakshinamoorthy. The entire film was shot in Chennai. The title look of the poster was released by Mari Selvaraj, and the trailer of the film was released on 23 August 2023. The film was produced by Rolling Sound Pictures and distributed by V House Productions.

== Reception ==
News7 Tamil critic wrote that "Madan, who has acted in films including Ayali and Maaveeran, has proved that he knows how to direct through the film "Noodles". It is a small budget film, but it is well enjoyed."Logesh Balachandran of The Times of India rated 3.5 out of 5 and stated that "While Noodles explores familiar themes, its intense and powerful screenplay keeps the audience captivated throughout.".Maalai Malar critic rated 3 out if 5 and noted that "This film is an example that a good story doesn't need big money."
