= Show Time (film) =

Indian Telugu-language film by Madhan Dakshinamurthy

- Theatrical release poster
- Directed by: Madhankumar Dhakshinamoorthy
- Written by: Madhankumar Dhakshinamoorthy
- Based on: Noodles (2023) by Madhankumar Dhakshinamoorthy
- Produced by: Kishore Garikipati
- Starring: Naveen Chandra; Naresh; Kamakshi Bhaskarla
- Cinematography: Vinod Raja Thiyagaraja
- Edited by: Sarath Kumar
- Music by: Shekar Chandra
- Production company: SkyLine Movies
- Distributed by: AK Entertainments
- Release date: 4 July 2025
- Running time: 108 minutes
- Country: India
- Language: Telugu

Show Time is a 2025 Indian Telugu-language thriller film written and directed by Madhankumar Dhakshinamoorthy. The film features Naveen Chandra, Naresh and Kamakshi Bhaskarla in important roles.

The film was released on 4 July 2025. This movie is a remake of the director's own Tamil film Noodles (2023).

== Plot ==
A joyous moment in the neighborhood goes awry on a chance confrontation and doubles up the protagonist's woes in a freak accident. Show Time is a drama filled with suspense, thrill, humor, and loads of entertainment for the family. The film starts with night time Surya playing with his friends and kids from other house, it's big fun all having, seeing this ci Lakshmi warns them to not cause noise that finally turns into quarrel and Surya with his wife challenge c.i lakshmikanth show the complaint letter of them making nuisance to others and wife Shanthi tells she will complain to human rights, so c.i goes away from there with his assistant. Next few days suspicious things happen and Surya is warned by shopkeeper that the c.i is very dangerous to fight with. Another day night suddenly Surya sees some stranger lying dead and asks Shanthi who is he for which Shanthi tells he is a robber tried to steal away her gold chain and got dead by her hitting to protect herself. Surya become nervous and takes body to another room. Surya gets phone number of advocate varada from the shopkeeper and so Surya invite adv varada to his home and tells of the killing due to which varada becomes very afraid and tells they should dispose the body in the front of house and surrender to police and later varada plan to rescue them. So varada tells pick the body and dispose in front of the house when he knock once and varada goes to the front and sees if anybody coming on the street so knocks once and Surya about to dispose, someone comes on the road so varada knocks twice indicating don't dispose the body, like this time goes and tired varada enters inside and closes the door, Surya tells his shanthi's family visiting them today after seven years of married life, by this time a stranger knocks, Surya dispose body in another room.stranger is c.i lakshmikanth who now show complaint paper against Surya, Surya now tensed is silent without much back talking against c.i lakshmikanth. C.i makes Surya repent with his wife by bending down and rising telling he won't go for argument with police hereafter and makes Surya bring everyone who were with Surya in the previous night and makes everyone to bend and rise. One boy among them meanwhile has camera recording c.i lakshmikanth torture and this c.i tries to catch the boy as Surya blocks the c.i, the boy escapes and post the video in social media, the same time c.i loses balance and falls over the chest of the dead person who now wakes with deep breath, seeing this Surya become courageous and the advocate also starts give back to c.i good reply thus driving away the wicked c.i lakshmikanth. By this time shanthi's family members visit them and film again ends with night Surya cheering with the friends.

== Cast ==
- Naveen Chandra as Surya
- Naresh as Advocate A. Varada Rajulu
- Kamakshi Bhaskarla as Shanthi
- Raja Ravindra as CI Lakshmi Kanth
- Manik Reddy as Venkat Rao
- Gosukonda Lakshmi Sujatha
- Gemini Suresh
- Vani Shalini
- Uha Reddy Solipuram as Vyshu, Surya and Shanthi's daughter
- Surya as Shanthi's father
- Prabhavathi Varma as Shanthi's mother
- Gavireddy Srinivas
- Rohini Reddy Noni
- BHEL Prasad Rao

== Release and reception ==
Show Time was released on 4 July 2025. The film was later released on Amazon Prime Video and Sun NXT on 25 July 2025.

BH Harsh of Cinema Express rated the film 2.5 out of 5 and opined that "Show Time constantly dwindles between being a tense atmospheric thriller to being a bland narrative where things often get stagnant". The Hindu felt that the film had a potential premise but was weakened by the screenplay and narration. Echoing the same, Shreya Varanasi of The Times of India stated, "an intense crime thriller weighed down by a stretched screenplay".
