= Lubber Pandhu =

2024 Indian-Tamil language sports drama film

- Theatrical release poster
- Directed by: Tamizharasan Pachamuthu
- Written by: Tamizharasan Pachamuthu
- Produced by: S. Lakshman Kumar; A. Venkatesh
- Starring: Harish Kalyan; Dinesh; Swasika; Sanjana Krishnamoorthy
- Cinematography: Dinesh Purushothaman
- Edited by: Madan Ganesh
- Music by: Sean Roldan
- Production company: Prince Pictures
- Distributed by: Sri Kumaran Films
- Release date: 20 September 2024
- Running time: 144 minutes
- Country: India
- Language: Tamil

Lubber Pandhu (/ˈlʌbbərˌpʌnðʊ/ transl. Rubber Ball) is a 2024 Indian Tamil-language sports drama film directed by Tamizharasan Pachamuthu, in his directorial debut and produced by Prince Pictures. The film stars Harish Kalyan and Dinesh in the lead roles, alongside Sanjana Krishnamoorthy, Swasika, Bala Saravanan, Kaali Venkat, Geetha Kailasam, Devadarshini, TSK, and Jenson Diwakar.

The film was officially announced in March 2023. Principal photography commenced the following month. The film has music composed by Sean Roldan, cinematography handled by Dinesh Purushothaman and editing by Madan Ganesh.

Lubber Pandhu released worldwide on 20 September 2024 in theatres to critical acclaim from critics. It emerged as a huge commercial success at the box office grossing 44 crores.

== Plot ==
In 2011, in Perambalur, a young cricketer named Anbu was denied to join the "Jolly Friends" team due to caste-based discrimination. Undeterred, Karuppaiya, the team's captain, intervened and allowed Anbu to play against the rival team, "Sachin Boys," led by their star batsman, Poomalai, aka Gethu, an avid fan of Vijayakanth and a skilled painter, who had previously worked in Dubai. Despite being included in the team and being a talented bowler Anbu was not given a chance to play, prompting him to leave the ground in frustration, accompanied by his friend Kathadi. Following the first innings, Gethu's wife, Yasodhai, arrived at the cricket ground, enraged, and ploughed the pitch with her tractor to deter villagers from inviting her husband to play cricket again.

10 years later, in Cuddalore, Anbu is an ardent Chennai Super Kings and Vijay fan, and owns a sportswear shop in Tittakudi. Though he is a well-talented all-rounder, Anbu's desire to join the "Jolly Friends" team is consistently being thwarted by Venkatesh, Karuppaiya's brother. So, Anbu plays as a guest player for multiple teams and helps them win the games. He falls in love with Durga, a trainee nurse, after meeting her at a marriage function. Unbeknownst to Anbu, Durga is Gethu's daughter.

Anbu witnesses the 40-year-old Gethu smashing the bowlers and criticizes Gethu's outdated cricket techniques to his friend Kathadi, which is overheard by Gethu's cousin Kozhandai who eventually conveys it to Gethu. Gethu belittles Anbu as a young amateur thereby hurting Anbu's ego. Weeks later, en route to meet Durga's family, Anbu is caught midway by another team to play against Gethu's team, while his family goes to meet Durga. As Anbu faces off against Gethu in the match he is mocked by Kuzhandai and gang repeatedly. But Anbu bowls him out in his first over and silences the crowd. This hurts Gethu's untouched ego and he immediately leaves the field. Later, Anbu learns that Durga is Gethu's daughter during a visit to their home and attempts to make amends, but his efforts turn unsuccessful.

Again they cross paths in the final match hosted by Gethu's team. Anbu's team bats first and scores well. As Gethu's team chases it, everyone except Gethu loses their wickets easily to Anbu. Gethu scores against Anbu, but in the last over Anbu gets a chance to mankad Gethu and win the match. As Gethu realizes, Anbu's ego comes into play and he refuses to mankad Gethu, giving him a warning through the umpire. Gethu's pride is shattered and he walks away from the field, giving the win to Anbu's team. Post the match Kozhandhai's taunts about Anbu's exclusion from "Jolly Friends" sparks a fierce retaliation from Anbu. Gethu, already seething, engages Anbu in a dirty brawl. Durga intervenes, slapping Anbu and ending their relationship while Yasodhai, fed up with Gethu storms off and moves to her mother's place.

Kathadi informs Karuppaiya about Anbu's humiliation, and so Karuppaiya decides to include Anbu in the 20th-anniversary celebrations match, despite his team members' objections. But Venkatesh's refusal forces Anbu to form a new team, "Adengappa 11 Per," and vows to triumph over "Jolly Friends." Karuppaiya, his daughter Akila, and Gethu swayed by Anbu's clever ego-stroking make him join the match. In their debut match, Anbu's brief stint at the crease ends in dismissal, and a struggling Gethu loses his wicket though his determination was evident. Karuppaiya and Akila's stellar partnership helps secure a thrilling victory. Gethu's mother consoles Yasodhai, and so she reunites with Gethu. However, Yasodhai confronts Anbu's mother, criticizing Anbu's focus on cricket as a waste of time, similar to her husband. Anbu confronts Durga, but she replies that her father's acceptance is important while also rebuking her family for arranging marriages and vows to wait until her parents accept Anbu. She further confronts her father accusing him of letting his ego hinder his acceptance of Anbu.

In the semifinal match, Gethu struggles, but Anbu's crucial assistance secures victory, advancing them to the finals. Anbu apologizes to Gethu for past mistakes. Meanwhile, Yasodhai plans Durga's engagement, prompting Anbu to request Venkatesh to reschedule the match, but Venkatesh demands a public apology, putting Anbu in a dilemma. Torn between stopping the engagement and playing the final match, Anbu attends the engagement. Venkatesh, fearing the backlash from a possible loss recruits a strong batsman Prasanth who is also from the same caste as Anbu, which angers two of his teammates. In the finals, "Adengappa 11 Per" starts without Anbu, bats first, and loses 5 wickets for 30 runs. To salvage the team, Gethu enters without any protective gear, taunts the opposition, and single-handedly scores 94 to put a massive total in the first innings. Durga trusts that Anbu will arrive. He arrives for engagement. Durga sends him back to join the match for the second innings. Though he bowled well, they narrowly lose while Anbu and Gethu reconcile.

Weeks later Karuppaiya and the rest of "Adengappa 11 Per" reach another tournament to witness a new "Jolly Friends" team which now has players including Prasanth and others regardless of caste or religion. It is revealed that Anbu intentionally lost in the last ball, prioritizing the inclusive spirit of "Jolly Friends" cricket team, and such a change is the actual victory than any other match victory. Anbu and Durga get married, and Yasodhai asks both Anbu and Gethu to promise that they will refrain from cricket, to which they make a false promise.

== Cast ==
- Harish Kalyan as Anbu
  - Parvez Musharaf as Teenager Anbu
- Dinesh as Poomalai "Gethu"
- Swasika as Yasodhai
- Sanjana Krishnamoorthy as Durga, Poomalai and Yasodha's daughter
- Kaali Venkat as Karuppaiya
- Bala Saravanan as Kathadi, Anbu's friend
  - Vishwa Mithran as Teenager Kathadi
- Devadarshini as Vijaya, Anbu's mother
- Geetha Kailasam as Poomalai's mother
- Jenson Dhivakar as Kozhandhai, Poomalai's friend
- Jawahar Sakthi as Manoj, Kozhandhi friend
- TSK as Venkatesh, Karuppaiya's brother
- Mounica Senthilkumar as Sathya, Durga's sister-in-law
- Karnan Janaki as Yasodhai's mother
- Veeramani Ganesan as Money borrower
- Sarath as Aravind
- AV. Deva as Kulla Karuppu aka Modern Malinga
- Nivashini P. U. as Akhila
- N.K Vengataseshan
- Pradeep Durairaj as Bad Boys Team Captain & Wicketkeeper
- Poobalam Pragatheeswaran as a cricket commentator
- Adithya Kathir as a cricket commentator
- VJ Tara as herself

== Production ==
In early March 2023, Harish Kalyan announced that he would be starring in a film titled Lubber Pandhu directed by debutant Tamizharasan Pachamuthu, who had earlier worked as an assistant director. The cast also includes Sanjana and Swasika. In an interview, Pachamuthu mentioned that he connects with the character Anbu, as cricket was once his top priority as well. For the character Gethu, he drew inspiration from someone in his hometown. While developing the script, he found further inspiration in the Malayalam film Ayyappanum Koshiyum (2020), which helped him create a world around these two characters. S. J. Suryah revealed that he was the initial choice for the role that Dinesh later took. Principal photography began in mid April 2023. On 7 July 2023 the makers announced that the dubbing process has begun.

== Music ==
Lubber Pandhu

Soundtrack album by Sean Roldan
- Genre: Feature film soundtrack
- Language: Tamil
- Producer: Sean Roldan

Sean Roldan chronology
Raghu Thatha (2024)	Lubber Pandhu (2024)	Parari (2024)

Singles from Lubber Pandhu
- 1. "Chillanjirukkiye" Released: 10 November 2023; 2. "Aasa Orave" Released: 22 February 2024; 3. "Damma Goli" Released: 10 September 2024

The soundtrack was composed by Sean Roldan. All the songs were penned by Mohan Rajan. The first single "Chillanjirukkiye" was released on 10 November 2023, and had vocals performed by Pradeep Kumar and Sivaangi. The second single "Aasa Orave" was released on 22 February 2024, which had vocals performed by the composer himself. The third single "Damma Goli" was released on 10 September 2024. Additionally, the songs "Nee Pottu Vecha" composed by Ilaiyaraaja for the 1989 film Ponmana Selvan, "Antha Vaanathapola" composed by Ilaiyaraaja for the 1992 film Chinna Gounder and "Aadungada Enna Suthi" composed by Mani Sharma for the 2007 film Pokkiri are featured in the film.

All tracks are written by Mohan Rajan.

Track listing
No.	Title	Singer(s)	Length
1.	"Chillanjirukkiye"	Pradeep Kumar, Sivaangi Krishnakumar	4:02
2.	"Aasa Orave"	Sean Roldan	3:45
3.	"Damma Goli"	Gana Settu	2:59
4.	"Lubber Pandhu Theme"	Sean Roldan	2:35

== Release ==
=== Theatrical ===
Lubber Pandhu was released theatrically on 20 September 2024.

=== Home media ===
The film began streaming on Disney+ Hotstar from 31 October 2024 in Tamil, Telugu, Hindi, Kannada, and Malayalam languages.

== Reception ==
The film received widespread critical acclaim from critics and audience.

M. Suganth of The Times of India rated the film four out of five stars, praised the writing, cinematography, and performances of the lead cast, and called the film "The year's most wholesome entertainer". Anusha Sundar of OTTplay gave it four out of five stars and opined that "Lubber Pandhu is a superbly crafted sports drama that cleverly entwines family drama to sportsmanship."

Avinash Ramachandran of Indian Express wrote that "Efficient writing and convincing performances makes Lubber Pandhu a truly terrific issue-based film that ensures bitter pills are swallowed, but not before a dollop of honey is given on the side". Gopinath Rajendran of The Hindu wrote, "Lubber Pandhu is a breath of fresh air and a refreshing addition to the ever-growing list of films on cricket; so much so that we can call it a whole new ballgame."

Kirubhakar Purushothaman of News18 rated the film four out of five stars and opined that "Lubber Pandhu leaves you with a fulfilled heart and a well-fed mind that comes after watching a brilliant cricket match, where both teams gave it their all. It is hard to define sportsmanship in absolute terms, but seeing Lubber Pandhu one can get it." Sudhir Srinivasan of The New Indian Express wrote that "It has the soul of a sports film and the mind of a well-crafted drama. It approaches these cricket portions like it were a romance."

Sruthi Ganapathy Raman of The News Minute wrote that "Lubber Pandhu is a film where gully cricket commentary fills the ears, men use the paint on their house to depict team loyalty, and for a change, the bride’s parents assert dominance over the groom’s. It is also a film where cricket isn’t just cricket, but an analogy for something much bigger." Nakkheeran critic stated that "Moreover, this film 'Rubber Bandhu' has been a pleasant surprise success for the viewers as it gives us a feeling similar to what we felt while watching the movie Chennai 28 and the extent to which it gave us an impact." karthi Kg of Puthiya Thalaimurai rated four out of five star and wrote that "This rubber ball is a good sports movie to watch with family."
