= Thug Life (2025 film) =

2025 Indian film by Mani Ratnam

- Theatrical release poster
- Directed by: Mani Ratnam
- Written by: Mani Ratnam; Kamal Haasan
- Produced by: Kamal Haasan; R. Mahendran; Mani Ratnam; Siva Ananth
- Starring: Kamal Haasan; Silambarasan; Trisha Krishnan; Aishwarya Lekshmi; Ashok Selvan; Abhirami; Joju George; Nassar
- Cinematography: Ravi K. Chandran
- Edited by: A. Sreekar Prasad
- Music by: A. R. Rahman
- Production companies: Raaj Kamal Films International; Turmeric Media; Madras Talkies
- Distributed by: see below
- Release date: 5 June 2025
- Running time: 163 minutes
- Country: India
- Language: Tamil
- Budget: ₹200–300 crore
- Box office: est. ₹98 crore

Thug Life is a 2025 Indian Tamil-language gangster action drama film directed by Mani Ratnam, who co-wrote the script with Kamal Haasan. Produced by Raaj Kamal Films International, Turmeric Media and Madras Talkies, the film stars Kamal Haasan and Silambarasan in the lead roles alongside Trisha Krishnan, Aishwarya Lekshmi, Abhirami, Ashok Selvan, Joju George, Nassar, Mahesh Manjrekar, Ali Fazal, Sanjana Krishnamoorthy and Tanikella Bharani. It marks the reunion of Haasan and Ratnam after their previous collaboration, Nayakan (1987). The film follows Rangaraaya Sakthivel, a feared mafia kingpin in New Delhi, who seeks redemption and revenge after being betrayed by his brother, Rangaraaya Manickam, and the one he raised, Amaran.

The film was officially announced in November 2022 under the tentative title KH234, as it is Haasan's 234th film as a lead actor, and the official title was revealed a year later. Principal photography took place from January to late 2024 across Chennai, Kanchipuram, Pondicherry, New Delhi, and parts of North India. The film has music composed by A. R. Rahman, cinematography handled by Ravi K. Chandran, and editing by A. Sreekar Prasad.

Thug Life was released theatrically on 5 June 2025 in India by Red Giant Movies in standard, IMAX and EPIQ formats. The film received negative response from critics, who praised the performances of Haasan and Silambarasan, the cinematography and the staging, but criticized the second half's predictable screenplay. The film underperformed at the box office.

== Plot ==
In 1994, in Old Delhi, gang leader Sadanand Yadav meets with rival kingpins Rangaraaya Manickavel "Manickam" and his younger brother and co-leader Rangaraaya Sakthivel to discuss a truce after years of rivalry. However, unbeknownst to Manickam and Sakthivel, Sadanand later breaks the truce by orchestrating a shootout involving the Delhi Police. The ensuing tussle results in the death of a newspaper deliveryman caught in the crossfire when he is unknowingly shot by Manickam, leaving his children, Amaran and Chandra, separated. Sakthivel believes that Amaran shielded him during the chaos. Moved by the incident after learning that Amaran's father was the newspaper deliveryman, Sakthivel adopts him and raises him as his own son, while promising Amaran that he will find Chandra.

In 2016, Manickam's daughter Shanthi commits suicide after being cheated by Sadanand's nephew Ranvijay. In retaliation, Amaran captures Ranvijay, and Sakthivel kills him. As a result, Sakthivel is imprisoned, leaving Amaran in charge of the empire. Later, Manickam and Amaran meet Sadanand, who proposes a peace deal: he will enter politics, and Amaran can take over his business territories. Though initially displeased, Sakthivel eventually accepts the arrangement and is released from prison. Upon his return, he approves of his daughter Mangai's relationship with Naaga, the son of his henchman Sivaguru, and arranges their wedding. During the ceremony, he observes the shifting dynamics of his empire, with everyone now treating Amaran as the leader, concerning him because he thinks Amaran might overthrow him.

While traveling with his gang, Sakthivel narrowly survives an assassination attempt by henchmen of Deepak, Ranvijay's older brother, who swears to avenge his brother's death by finishing Sakthivel, despite Sadanand's reluctance due to their deal. Sakthivel is admitted to the hospital, where he meets Inspector Jai Royappa, who asks him about the gang war. After the incident, Sakthivel begins to suspect Amaran because of his absence during the attack, and eventually confronts him, deeply unsettling Amaran. Sakthivel's wife Jeeva tells him that Amaran was with them at that time and Mangai was pregnant, but she ended up miscarrying. Meanwhile, Manickam and others in the gang — Anburaj, Kahlua, and Pathrose — are wary of Sakthivel's constant suspicions of them and his interference in the gang's operations, and decide to overthrow him. They manipulate Amaran by falsely claiming that Sakthivel was responsible for his father's death during the 1994 shootout, convincing him to join their plot. Seeking peace, Sakthivel travels to Hilsa, Nepal on the way to Mount Kailash with them, unaware that another assassination attempt awaits him. Amaran joins the conspirators and throws Sakthivel off a cliff after shooting him, believing he has killed him. Upon returning, the gang declares Amaran as the new Sakthivel. However, it is revealed that Sakthivel has survived the fall and heads towards a nearby Buddhist monastery, narrowly escaping an avalanche.

Two years later, Sakthivel returns to Delhi, cold, calculated, and vengeful, having learnt martial arts from Nepali monks to aid in his quest. He learns that Jeeva has suffered traumatic memory loss due to the hysteria of learning about his supposed death and the subsequent manhandling by Manickam. Sakthivel then travels to Tiruchendur, where Jeeva and Mangai now live, and is distraught upon seeing his wife in a pitiable condition — she cannot remember who he is — prompting him to avenge his betrayers. He then proceeds to eliminate them one by one: he kills Anburaj by pushing his head against a helicopter's rotors, Pathrose by stabbing and pushing him in front of a running train, and Manickam by shooting and pushing him off a bridge in Goa. Only Amaran and Kahlua remain; Kahlua surrenders to Sakthivel and acts as his spy to track Amaran. However, Amaran soon discovers this and regrettably kills him. Sakthivel meets Jai, the son of Samuel Royappa from the 1994 shootout, and makes a deal with him: Sakthivel will give up his important political and business contacts to Jai to expose systemic corruption, while Jai will let Sakthivel kill Amaran for revenge. Sakthivel later contacts Indrani, his mistress, who is now in a one-sided relationship with Amaran. However, Deepak unknowingly kills her in a controlled bomb blast meant for Amaran, devastating both Sakthivel and Amaran. Whilst trying to save her, Sakthivel is injured when the ceiling collapses on him. He is rescued by Jai and taken to his house.

During his recovery, Sakthivel is treated by Dr. Anna, who is revealed to be Amaran's long-lost sister, Chandra — the one separated during the 1994 shootout. Sakthivel summons Amaran to the location of the original shootout. There, the two engage in a one-on-one fight. As the battle ends, Sakthivel convinces Amaran that he was not responsible for his father's death, making Amaran realise his mistake. Chandra arrives at the scene with Jai after having learnt of her long-lost brother's whereabouts from Sakthivel. Just when Amaran and Chandra are about to reunite, Deepak intervenes and fires a shot at Amaran. Sakthivel shields him, but the bullet fatally wounds Amaran. Sakthivel kills Deepak and tries to revive Amaran, but he dies from his injuries, leaving Sakthivel and Chandra devastated. Sakthivel later reflects on how death has haunted him throughout his life — taking his mother during childbirth, his brother through betrayal, and now Amaran, who was like a son to him.

Years later, Sakthivel, now a farmer, has given up his gangster life and lives peacefully with Jeeva (who still does not recognise him), Mangai, and others in a village with their young grandson, also named Sakthivel. During the end credits, it is shown that Jai has successfully arrested those engaging in corruption, based on information provided by Sakthivel.

== Cast ==
- Kamal Haasan as Rangaraaya Sakthivel Naicker "Sakthi"
- Silambarasan TR as Amaran "Amar"
  - Master Kesav as Young Amaran
- Abhirami as Jeeva, Sakthi's wife
- Trisha Krishnan as Indhrani, Sakthi's mistress (Voice dubbed by Krithika Nelson)
- Aishwarya Lekshmi as Dr. Anna/Chandra, Amaran's sister and Jai's ex-wife (Voice dubbed by Ashmini Balakrishnan)
- Ashok Selvan as Inspector Jaikumar Royappa "Jai"
- Joju George as Kanjirappally Pathrose, Sakthi's aide
- Nassar as Rangaraaya Manickavel "Manickam", Sakthi's brother
- Mahesh Manjrekar as Sadanand Yadav, Deepak and Raanu's maternal uncle
- Ali Fazal as Deepak Yadav, Raanu's brother
- Tanikella Bharani as Sivaguru, Sakthi's aide
- Vadivukkarasi as Pechiamma "Pechi"
- Sanjana Krishnamoorthy as Mangai, Sakthi's daughter and Naaga's wife
- Vaiyapuri as Unni
- Arjun Chidambaram as Khalua, Sakthi's aide
- Chetan as Stan, Jai's aide
- Bagavathi Perumal as Anburaj, Sakthi's aide
- Rohit Saraf as Ranvijay "Raanu" Yadav, Deepak's brother
- Chinni Jayanth as Sadanand's right-hand
- Baburaj as Inspector Samuel Royappa, Jai's father and Dr. Anna's former father-in-law
- Gopi Kannadasan as a corrupt police officer
- Elango Kumaravel as Muthuraman, Amaran's and Chandra's late father
- Nithya Shri as Maya, Khalua's girlfriend
- Srikanth K. Vijayan as Raanu's friend
- Mahitha Ravilla
- Adithya Krishnan R as Naaga, Sivaguru's son and Mangai's husband
- Alisha Rahman as Rangaraaya Shanthi, Manickam's daughter
- Smrithi Parameswar as Sivaguru's wife
- Lavi Pajni as Sadanand's henchman
- Jalaja in a special appearance
- Rajshri Deshpande as Kanika, Sadanand's sister (cameo appearance)
- Sanya Malhotra in a special appearance as a dancer in the song "Jinguchaa"

== Production ==
=== Development ===
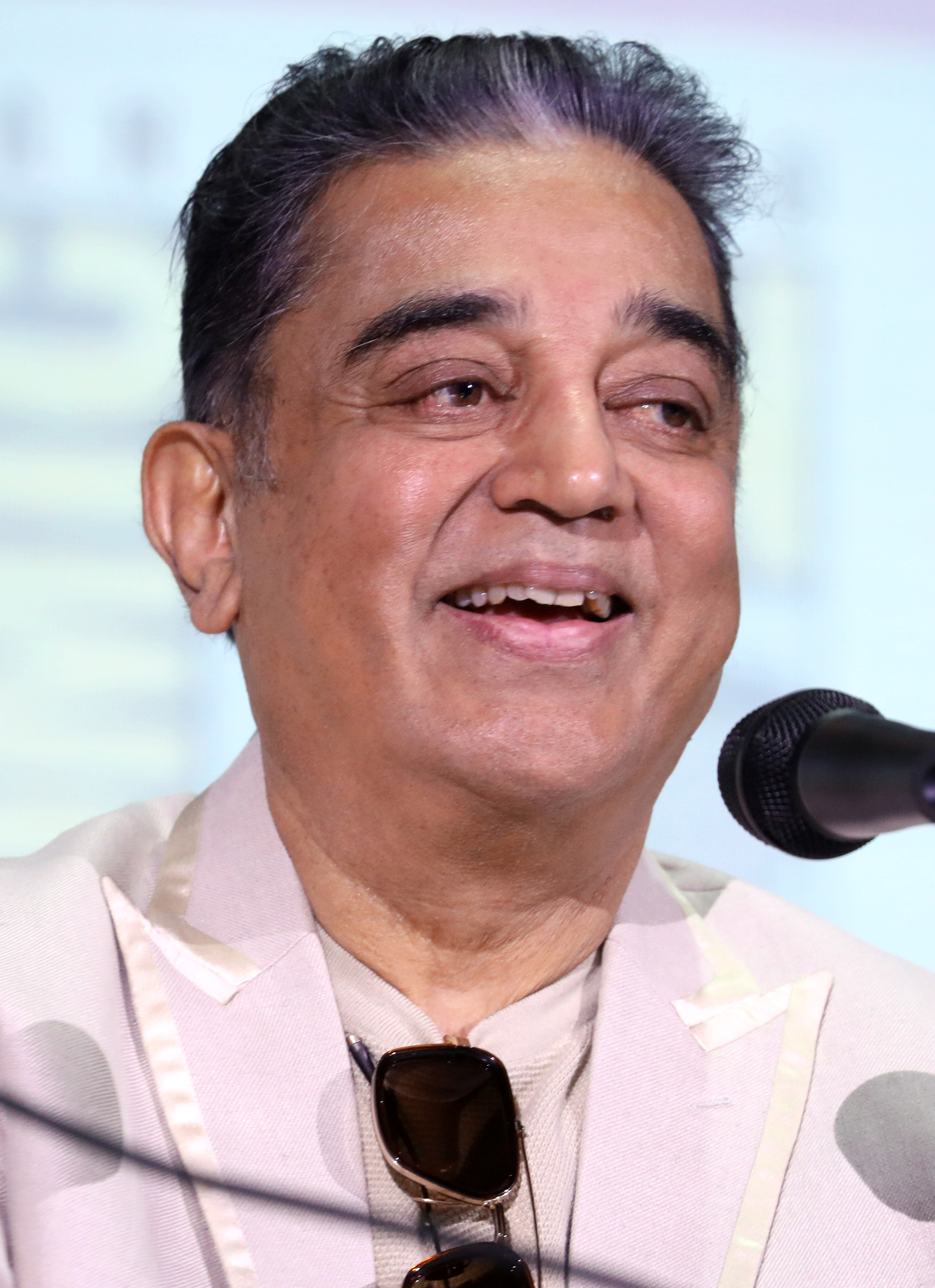
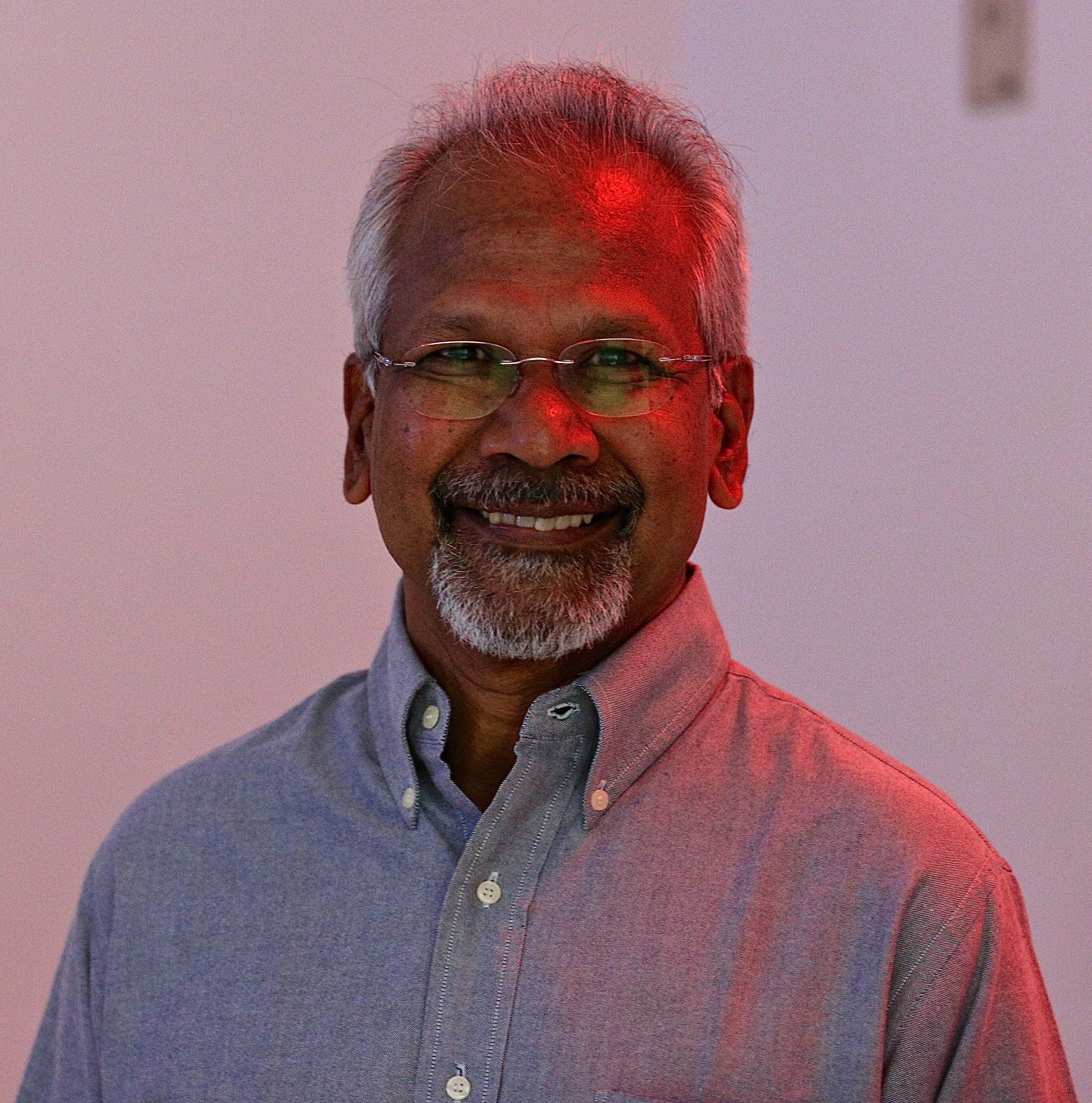
Thug Life is the second collaboration of Kamal Haasan with Mani Ratnam after Nayakan (1987).

In late 2002, Kamal Haasan unveiled plans for a film project titled Moo, which he intended to co-direct alongside filmmakers Mani Ratnam and Singeetam Srinivasa Rao. The screenplay was to explore the intricacies of the Rashomon effect, presenting audiences with three distinct interpretations of a single incident. However, Ratnam opted out of the project, citing his commitments to Aayutha Ezhuthu (2004), which used a similar narrative device. Undeterred by Ratnam's departure, Haasan proceeded with the concept, resulting in the creation of Virumaandi (2004). This film, centred on the interrogation of two prison inmates, retained the thematic essence of Moo. Following a decade, in late 2012, Hollywood producer Barrie M. Osborne had approached to make Moo into an English film. The actor announced the project in February 2013, but it was later shelved.

Haasan, who did a voice-over for Ratnam's Ponniyin Selvan: I in 2022, announced on 6 November that he would work with Ratnam again on a project after the Ponniyin Selvan film series. The project was funded by their companies—Raaj Kamal Films International, Madras Talkies—and Udhayanidhi Stalin's Red Giant Movies, which also co-produced Haasan's Indian 2 (2024). Tentatively titled Kamal Haasan 234, it marks a full-fledged reunion of the actor and director after 37 years since the release of their cult film Nayakan (1987). Haasan stated that they were taking time with the development and pre-production because he and Ratnam want to make the film as strong as Nayakan. Stunt choreography duo Anbariv, who became involved in the project in October 2023, stated that the film would be an action film, and a few days later, it was touted as a gangster action drama. The film's official title, Thug Life, was announced on 6 November 2023, the eve of Haasan's birthday. It was the first instance where a Ratnam film has been titled in English; his previous ventures were titled in regional languages.

Made on a production budget of ₹180 crore (US$19 million), with marketing costs valued at ₹20 crore (US$2.1 million), Kamal and Ratnam decided to take the revenue sharing model, as they were the producers and benefit the production. Speaking to Anupama Chopra, Haasan stated that the film was based on an original script he wrote, which was the shelved project Amar Hain. The title was a pun, where the principal character Amar, who was believed to be dead is not dead, referencing the trailer of Alfred Hitchcock's The Trouble with Harry (1955). He originally wrote the basic story line and characters, while Ratnam took it and developed it further. Haasan further suggested the title, Thug Life, inspired by American rapper Tupac Shakur, which Ratnam was impressed and was the official title for the film.

=== Pre-production ===
"[The] most exciting part of Thug Life was working with Mani—automatically all things happen [...] He adds so much value to a scene; you see it grow in front of your eyes. As a director, you can take a backseat and see a scene grow."

— Haasan on his collaboration with Ratnam in Thug Life

Ratnam stated that the reason for why it took so long to collaborate, was that they did not find a suitable script for Haasan for years until they recently found one which he co-wrote along with Haasan. After Ponniyin Selvan: II released in 2023, Ratnam left to Kodaikanal to write the final script. It took four months for the writing and the pre-production. A muhurat puja was held on 27 October 2023 at the headquarters of Raaj Kamal Films International in Chennai. By then, the team began shooting for the promotional teaser, which was completed within three days. The teaser was released on 6 November 2023.

In mid-September 2023, Ravi K. Chandran was announced as cinematographer, marking his fourth film with Ratnam after Kannathil Muthamittal (2002), Aayutha Ezhuthu and Yuva (2004) and second with Haasan after the unfinished film Marudhanayagam. A. R. Rahman would score the music, in his eighteenth consecutive film with the director. He further retained his norm technicians including editor A. Sreekar Prasad, production designer Sharmishta Roy and publicity designer Gopi Prasannaa. Amritha Ram would style Haasan along with his regular costume designers Eka Lakhani and makeup artist Ranjith Ambady. Chintu Mohapatra and S. Barani were appointed as the executive producers of the film by the production house.

=== Casting ===
Haasan would sport several looks, one of which resembles his short hairstyle from Sathyaa (1988). The name of his character, Rangaraya Sakthivel, is a reference to his role as Sakthivel Naicker from Nayakan. In early November 2023, Dulquer Salmaan, Trisha Krishnan and Ravi Mohan were announced as part of the cast. (Note: Attributed to multiple references:) Shortly afterwards, Gautham Karthik, Joju George, and Aishwarya Lekshmi were confirmed to be part of the film in early January 2024. (Note: Attributed to multiple references:) However, Dulquer was reported to have opted out in March due to scheduling conflicts, followed by reports of Ravi opting out as well. The departure of these actors, along with Gautham's, were confirmed in May when their names were omitted from a post by the production house.

Silambarasan was brought on board, marking his first collaboration with Haasan and his second with Ratnam after Chekka Chivantha Vaanam (2018). The actor was initially approached for Ratnam's Ponniyin Selvan, but eventually was not finalised due to scheduling conflicts. Silambarasan recalled on his admiration for Haasan during his childhood, as his "on screen guru" and added that working with the actor was a "special feeling". His character in the film, balances both "classy, performance-oriented Simbu" as well as a "raw and stylish" version of the actor. Ashok Selvan was confirmed to have been brought on board. He called it a "dream come true" moment on working with the director, while also recalling on he had been auditioned for the director's Kadal (2013), which he was not selected.

Sanya Malhotra would make her Tamil debut with this film. Although it was originally believed that she would have a major role, Ratnam confirmed her role was limited to the song "Jingucha". He explained that since the film is set in Delhi, and the need for a North Indian actress, resulted in her casting. Pankaj Tripathi, Ali Fazal and Vaiyapuri were present at the film's preliminary shooting, although Tripathi later denied being part of the cast. In June 2024, it was announced that Rohit Saraf had joined the film. In July 2024, Abhirami and Nassar were also cast in prominent roles, with the former stating that she would be paired opposite Haasan, reuniting with him after Virumaandi (2004). Sanjana Krishnamoorthy, who worked as an assistant director in the film, would also appear in a brief role.

=== Filming ===
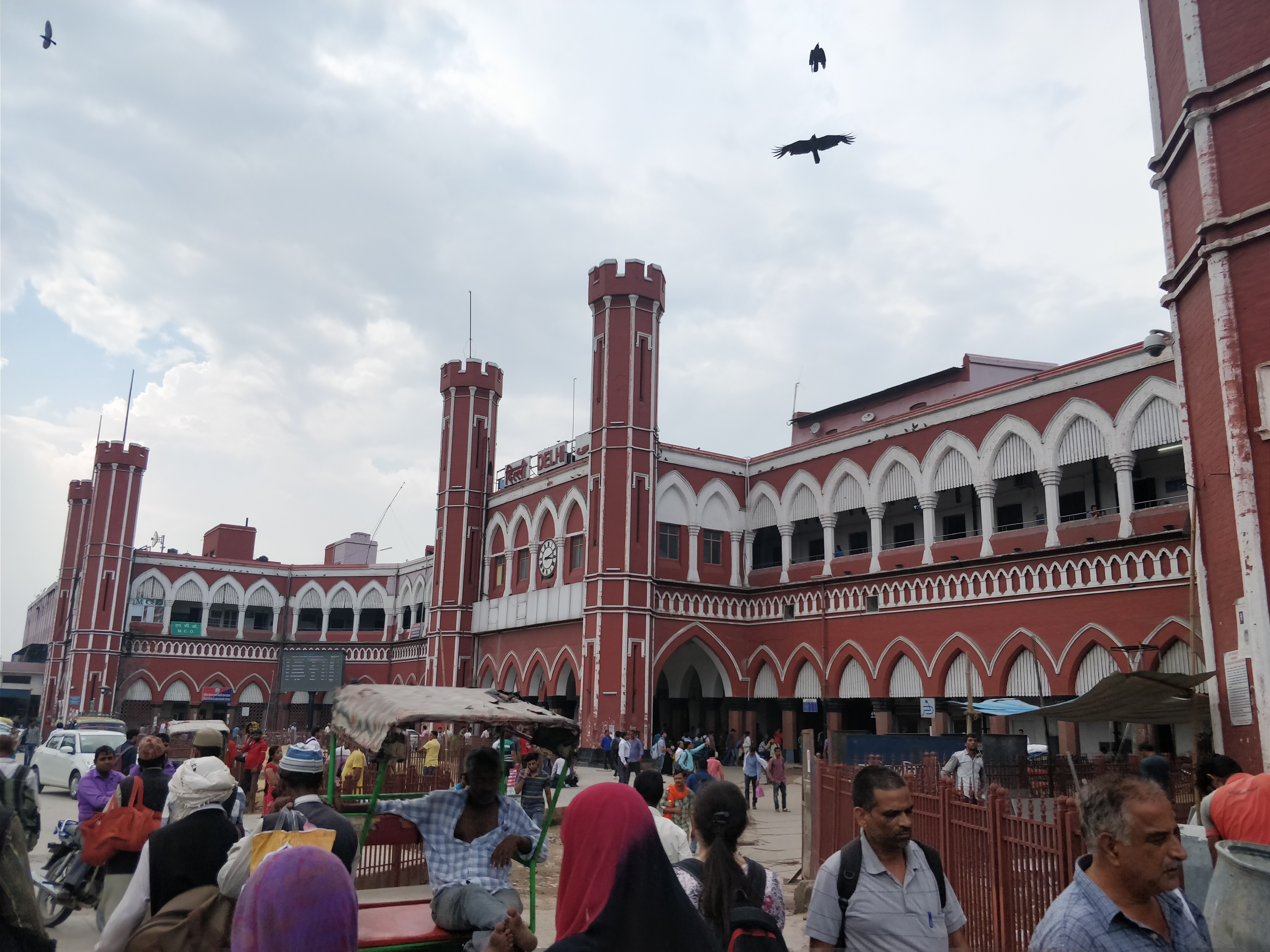
A part of Thug Life was filmed in Old Delhi.

Principal photography began with the first schedule on 24 January 2024 at a college in Shenoy Nagar. On 30 January, director Sudha Kongara, along with director Bejoy Nambiar, visited the sets and posted stills on X. Haasan filmed a portion with Abhirami and Joju before he left to the United States to participate in the post-production works for Indian 2. Filming for the first schedule completed on 31 January. Ratnam began location scouting for the second schedule in early February in European countries, including Serbia. Trisha revealed through her Instagram account on 21 February that she had joined the sets. Initially, for the third schedule, the makers would travel to Siberia; however, due to Haasan's political commitments and not being able to allot the dates, the schedule was postponed from starting. In late April, Silambarasan and the makers headed to Jaisalmer to film the promotional teaser for the actor, which released on 8 May.

After completing the works there, on 21 April, they commenced the second schedule in New Delhi. A sequence featuring Haasan, Silambarasan and around 200 background artists were reportedly shot behind the Red Fort on 23 April. Both the actors, along with Nassar, Abhirami, Vaiyapuri and Malhotra began filming a portion on 6 May at the Sankat Mochan Hanuman Temple, which went on for three hours from 6 am to 9 am, to avoid mid-day summer heat. After completing the filming there, they moved to Old Delhi to shoot a certain indoor sequence. A picture featuring the actors at the temple was leaked on social media the same day, forcing the makers to release an official announcement confirming the casting of Silambarasan two days later. The team shot at Sankat Mochan Hanuman Temple, Tughlaqabad Fort and Pataudi Palace in this schedule which was wrapped on 12 May.

The third schedule begun on 21 May at Chennai. During this schedule, a reported love sequence featuring Silambarasan and Trisha was reported to have been filmed till 5 am. Two song sequences, with one reportedly being a dappankuthu featuring Haasan and Silambarasan and another being choreographed by Brindha and featuring Trisha were shot during the schedule, with the latter having a four-day rehearsal. In early June, production moved to Pondicherry Airport for an action sequence. On 6 June, Haasan, who took a short break after the song sequence, resumed filming his portions with the action sequence, along with Silambarasan and Ashok Selvan. An incident with Joju occurred when the actor did a stunt, which was jumping from a helicopter, where he tripped and fell, leading to a fractured left foot. The schedule wrapped on 13 June and Ratnam continued his recce in Europe for the concurrent schedule. As of July 2024, fifty percent of the film's shooting had been completed.

Filming resumed on 5 August for the subsequent schedule in Chennai. On 12 August, coinciding with Haasan's sixty-fifth year in the film industry, a behind-the-scenes still from the film featuring Haasan and Ratnam was released through social media. Filming took place at multiple phases, with an action sequence featuring Haasan being filmed at the outskirts of Kanchipuram, and Silambarasan's portions at Pondy Bazaar. Afterwards, in early September, an action sequence was filmed at a grand set erected in Kovalam. On 20 September, Haasan had completed filming his portions for the film. Despite principal photography announced as having wrapped on 24 September, on 26 October, Ratnam planned for shooting a romantic song featuring Silambarasan and Trisha across North India which began filming on 4 November. Production was completed with its entirety, after the song shoot being wrapped.

=== Post-production ===
The visual effects supervision for the film was handled by H. Monesh, with Ashirwad Hadkar serving as the colourist. A. Sreekar Prasad serves as the film's editor. Kamal Hassan and Silambarasan TR began dubbing their portions in late July 2024. Full-fledged post-production works began by 24 September.

== Music ==
The soundtrack is composed by A. R. Rahman, in his third collaboration with Kamal Haasan after Indian (1996) and Thenali (2000); and nineteenth with Ratnam. The music rights were acquired by Saregama for ₹20 crore (US$2.1 million). One of the songs featured lyrics written by Haasan himself, which he revealed were written within an hour, and produced in just a couple of hours. The first single "Jinguchaa" was released on 18 April 2025. The second single "Sugar Baby" was released on 21 May 2025. The audio launch was to be held on 16 May 2025 at the Nehru Stadium, but was later postponed to 24 May 2025 due to the 2025 India–Pakistan conflict, releasing the album on the same day.

== Marketing ==
The film's teaser trailer was released on the occasion of Kamal Haasan's birthday, 7 November 2024, revealing the June 2025 release date. Promotional activities commenced on 18 April 2025, with a press interaction featuring the cast and crew at Kalaivanar Arangam in Chennai; the team released the first single "Jinguchaa" as well as revealing the promotional plans prior to the release, and announced the key distributors and partners associated with the film. Thugs Talk, a two-episode series featuring Haasan, Silambarasan, Trisha, Abhirami and Selvan, was released through YouTube during late-April and early-May, where the cast members interact and share anecdotes on working in this film.

The film's trailer was launched on 17 May, at a launch event in Chennai. Besides the cast and crew, the team invited around 400 social media influencers for the trailer launch. The trailer garnered over 15 million views in under 24 hours. The Hindi trailer was launched on 20 May at Film City, Mumbai, followed by the Malayalam trailer on 21 May at Forum Mall Kochi and Telugu trailer on 22 May at AAA Cinemas in Hyderabad. Pre-release events were scheduled to be held at New Delhi, Bengaluru, Thiruvananthapuram and Visakhapatnam from 26 to 29 May, and in Malaysia and Dubai on 31 May and 1 June, respectively.

Google has partnered with Hassan's Raaj Kamal Films International to create a special interactive search effect. When users search for "Thug Life 2025" on Google, they'll see a short effect where a stylized fist interacts with the search page.

== Release ==
=== Theatrical ===
Thug Life was released theatrically on 5 June 2025 in standard, IMAX and EPIQ formats. It was originally scheduled for a release in the last quarter of 2024, but was delayed to allow more time for production to be completed. In the United Kingdom, as with the rest of the world, it is scheduled to be released on the same day; however, in a version which was classified 15 by the British Board of Film Classification (BBFC) on 28 May 2025 for strong violence, injury detail and suicide. The film went however through additional censorship on 30 May 2025, keeping the 15 classification while followed with 10 seconds of cuts. The film had the biggest release for a Tamil film in the United Kingdom, with over 255+ screens showcasing the film.

=== Distribution ===
Red Giant Movies bought the film's distribution rights in India, distributing themselves in Tamil Nadu, and sold the Andhra Pradesh and Telangana rights to Shreshth Movies, the Kerala rights to Sree Gokulam Movies, and the North India rights to Pen Marudhar. The break-even point in the Telugu states was estimated to be at ₹21 crore (US$2.2 million), the highest for a non-native language film in the states. The film's eight-week theatrical run prior to its premiere on Netflix enabled it to be screened at PVR INOX multiplexes, making it the first Tamil film to achieve this distinction. AP International and Home Screen Entertainment acquired the overseas distribution rights of the film.

=== Home media ===
The streaming rights were acquired by Netflix for ₹149.7 crore (US$16 million). The film was initially scheduled to begin streaming there from 7 August 2025, eight-weeks after the film's theatrical release. However, due to the film's poor commercial response, it premiered in July, 28 days after its theatrical release. The streaming service also requested 20% to 25% from the deal due to the response. The film began streaming on Netflix from 3 July 2025 in Tamil and dubbed versions of Telugu, Kannada and Malayalam and Hindi languages.

== Reception ==
=== Critical response ===
Thug Life received negative reviews from critics, who praised the performances of Kamal Haasan and Silambarasan, the cinematography and staging, but the predictability of the story in the second half received criticism. The film was also deemed by critics inferior to Nayakan, Kamal and Mani Ratnam's previous outing, many claiming this movie was a scam based on hype. On the review aggregator website Rotten Tomatoes, 25% of 12 critics' reviews are positive, with an average rating of 5.3/10.

Anupama Chopra of The Hollywood Reporter wrote, "Should you see Thug Life? Yes, because so many masters are at work here. But go in knowing that though the film has sparks which blaze momentarily, they never ignite into a glorious fire. And leave Nayakan behind. Perhaps no one, not even Ratnam and Haasan, can match that poetry." Krishna Selvaseelan of Tamil Guardian gave 4/5 stars and wrote, "Haasan set out to better his previous Ratnam collaboration, and may have done so." Kirubakhar Purushothaman of News18 gave 3/5 stars and wrote, "While Thug Life may not be Nayakan, it never tries to be. What it does offer is a compelling drama anchored by a magnetic lead performance, intelligent writing in parts, and an exploration of power, loyalty, and loss. It stumbles in its second act, but Kamal’s performance and Ratnam’s streaks of brilliance make it worth the ride." Ganesh Aaglave of Firstpost gave 3/5 stars and wrote, "On the whole, Thug Life is a massy affair, which can be enjoyed on the big screen."

Janani K of India Today gave 2.5/5 stars and wrote, "While the film had a great set-up pre-interval, it falls into a deep pit in the second half and there is no turning back – even for a legend like Mani Ratnam." Avinash Ramachandran of Cinema Express gave 2.5/5 stars and wrote, "Considering Thug Life is more tell than show for most of the time, the film needed to operate more in the drama space instead of becoming an action extravaganza." Kaushik Rajaraman of DT Next gave 2.5/5 stars and wrote, "A predictable plot with a weak story, this is an old wine in an old bottle-- rather Mani Ratnam's cocktail from scenes of his previous works. The film falls flat and ends up being just another movie that is passable." Latha Srinivasan of Hindustan Times gave 2.5/5 stars and wrote, "What plagues Mani Ratnam and Kamal Hassan film is ‘old wine in old bottle’ screenplay which loses steam mid-way."

Shajin Srijith of The Week gave 2/5 stars and wrote, "In some places, this Mani Ratnam directorial aspires to be 'Nayakan 2.0'; in others, it's split between becoming a 'John Wick', 'Batman Begins' or an 'Indian 1.5'." M Suganth of The Times of India gave 2/5 stars and wrote, "[…] with Thug Life, both Mani Ratnam and Kamal Haasan disappoint, delivering one of their weakest efforts, to make us wonder what they saw in this beaten-to-death storyline to get back together again." Saibal Chatterjee of NDTV gave 2/5 stars and wrote "Once the core of its central idea begins to wear thin as a result of being stretched to snapping point, not even Mani Ratnam's style and Kamal Haasan's presence are enough to pull the bacons out of the fire. Thug Life definitely needed more life." Goutham S of Pinkvilla gave 2/5 stars and wrote "Thug Life is nowhere close to being the next Nayakan, nor does it supersede it. While the movie has certain moments from an action perspective, it lacks the flair that matches its substance, making it one of the weakest films by Kamal Haasan and Mani Ratnam." Bollywood Hungama gave 2/5 stars and wrote "On the whole, Thug Life fails to entice due to the weak execution and silly post-interval portion. The Hindi version releases amid limited buzz and strong competition from Housefull 5. As a result, it will struggle to find an audience."

Anandu Suresh of The Indian Express gave 1.5/5 stars and wrote "The Mani Ratnam-Kamal Haasan film is plagued by extremely subpar writing that not only fails to make the most of its premise but also falls short in delivering an engaging experience." S. Viswanath of Deccan Herald gave 1.5/5 stars and wrote " Despite its iconic names and foot tapping songs, the film ultimately falls flat due to a storyline that feels sickeningly weak, obnoxiously monotonous, and entirely predictable, preventing this portrayal of a self-proclaimed "Yakuza one-man show" from truly resonating." Bhuvanesh Chandar of The Hindu wrote "Despite an excellent Kamal Haasan, a restrained Silambarasan TR, great production design and superb cinematography, Mani Ratnam’s film is a generic gangster drama that makes you grope in the dark for its beating heart." Nandini Ramnath of Scroll.in wrote "Thug Life looks fresh, exciting and seductive – the classic Mani Ratnam trick to make even the routine appear like something you have never seen before." Rajagopalan Venkataraman of Khaleej Times wrote, "Ratnam reserves the best for Thug Life in its first half, for it runs out of steam in the latter. Generic, run-of-the-mill. Words you wouldn’t normally reserve for his productions."

=== Box office ===
As of 10 June 2025, Thug Life has grossed ₹44.75 crore (US$4.6 million) in India, and ₹40.75 crore (US$4.2 million) in other territories, for a worldwide total of ₹85.5 crore (US$8.9 million). Thug Life was a commercial failure, suffering losses greater than other major Tamil and Telugu "disasters" such as Indian 2, Game Changer, and Kanguva in the recent past. Due to the film's failure, theater owners in Tamil Nadu sought compensation from the distributor, Red Giant Movies.

==== Pre-sale records ====
Thug Life opened for advance bookings in Tamil Nadu and other territories on 1 June 2025. Despite the high expectations for the film, Pinkvilla reported that the pre-sales figures were modest. As of 3 June, the film has grossed ₹6 crore (US$620,000) in advance bookings across India, with over ₹5 crore (US$520,000) from Tamil Nadu. Globally, the film performed better, with total advance booking reaching ₹13.5 crore (US$1.4 million). Over ₹7.5 crore (US$780,000) came from international markets, with North America being the strongest overseas territory. As of 4 June, the film recorded pre-sales of ₹8.25 crore (US$860,000)–₹8.50 crore (US$880,000) in Tamil Nadu for the opening day. Outside Tamil Nadu, the pre-sales were modest. In Kerala, the film earned approximately ₹60 lakh (US$62,000), while the combined bookings of the Telugu states and North India added another ₹1 crore (US$100,000).

==== India ====
On 4 June, industry tracking projected that the film would gross ₹40 crore (US$4.2 million)–₹50 crore (US$5.2 million) domestically on its opening day; some insiders saw those figures as conservative, expecting ₹20 crore (US$2.1 million). While these figures placed it behind Haasan's previous films—Vikram (₹33 crore) and Indian 2 (₹30 crore)—industry analysts noted that the projections were still strong given the film's limited market penetration. After advance bookings, Thug Life was estimated to open with ₹16 crore (US$1.7 million) in Tamil Nadu, performing strongly in urban regions such as Chennai, Coimbatore, and Chengalpet. Overall, the film grossed approximately ₹17 crore (US$1.8 million) on its first day across India.

However, the film saw a 55 percent drop on its second day, collecting ₹7.50 crore (US$780,000), and grossed ₹24.50 crore (US$2.5 million) over two days. The film closed its four-days extended weekend ₹40.25 crore (US$4.2 million) in India, significantly below industry projections. Regionally, Tamil Nadu contributed ₹32.50 crore (US$3.4 million), followed by Andhra Pradesh and Telangana with ₹3.25 crore (US$340,000), Kerala and the rest of India with ₹2.25 crore (US$230,000) respectively. The film's performance was regarded as disastrous by trade analysts. Thug Life was unlikely to cross the ₹50 crore (US$5.2 million) mark domestically, an unprecedented underperformance for a high-profile Kamal Haasan film, especially when compared to the gross of Indian 2 despite its own lukewarm reception. The poor domestic turnout also contributed to an overall theatrical loss for distributors and exhibitors.

The film continued to struggle during weekdays, collecting ₹2.25 crore (US$230,000) on Monday, ₹1.75 crore (US$180,000) on Tuesday, and ₹1.25 crore (US$130,000) on Wednesday. This brought its first-week domestic total to around ₹46 crore (US$4.8 million). The absence of release in Karnataka, due to controversy over Haasan's remarks on the Kannada language, also impacted collections, with trade analysts estimating a loss of approximately ₹5 crore (US$520,000) in potential revenue.

==== Other territories ====
Some publications reported that the film could be Kamal Haasan's highest international opening to date. Industry sources also said the film needed to gross ₹250 crore (US$26 million) to break-even when factoring in its production budget, premium video-on-demand, streaming deal with Netflix, audio deal with Saregama and satellite deal with Star Vijay. Thug Life was projected to gross around ₹25 crore (US$2.6 million)–₹35 crore (US$3.6 million) internationally on its first day, for a global debut of ₹75 crore (US$7.8 million). However, it grossed ₹19 crore (US$2.0 million) overseas, which was a comparatively stronger start than its domestic performance, bringing the film's worldwide debut to approximately ₹36.30 crore (US$3.8 million). It witnessed significant drops on day two internationally. Over its four-days extended weekend, Thug Life grossed approximately ₹41 crore (US$4.3 million) from international markets. Despite a stronger opening overseas, the film experienced significant drops across North America, the United Kingdom, Australia, and Southeast Asian territories due to mixed-to-poor audience reception. In total, Thug Life grossed around ₹81 crore (US$8.4 million) worldwide in its opening weekend. At the end of its week, it grossed ₹43 crore (US$4.5 million) internationally, for a worldwide total of ₹89 crore (US$9.2 million). While non-theatrical revenues helped minimise the loss for the producers, overseas theatrical buyers and exhibitors were expected to face substantial deficits.

== Controversies ==
=== Silambarasan's alleged industry ban ===
Shortly after Silambarasan's inclusion was confirmed in 2024 May, producer Ishari K. Ganesh demanded his removal, alleging there was an active "red card" issued by the Tamil Film Producers Council to the actor that prohibits him from accepting new projects until he completes Corona Kumar, which remains in development hell. However, Silambarasan denied having received a red card.

=== Age gap between Kamal Haasan and the lead actresses ===
In the film's trailer, Haasan's character was seen in a romantic relationship with Trisha's character. The trailer had also showcased a lip lock sequence between Abhirami and Haasan. The portrayal drew criticism from some audiences due to the 29-year age difference between Haasan and the actresses. Mani Ratnam addressed the concerns, noting that such age differences are not uncommon in real life and encouraged audiences to view the romance in the context of the characters, rather than the actors themselves.

=== Kamal Haasan's Kannada–Tamil comment ===
During a promotional event for the film in Bengaluru on 28 May 2025, Kamal Haasan remarked that the Kannada language had emerged from the Tamil language. The statement received criticism from several people, with many deeming the claim factually incorrect and culturally insensitive. The following day, the Karnataka Film Chamber of Commerce (KFCC) issued a statement demanding a public apology from Haasan within two days, or the film would be banned from release in the state.

On 30 May, KFCC announced that the film was banned as Haasan refused to apologise. The issue was subsequently brought before the Karnataka High Court, where, on 3 June, Haasan stated that he himself had decided to not release the film in Karnataka on 5 June. Justice M. Nagaprasanna adjourned the hearing to 10 June. The same day, the Tamil Film Active Producers Association requested the KFCC to lift the ban to ensure a 5 June release for the film in Karnataka. Haasan's decision to not apologise and release on 5 June in Karnataka was supported by some fans and audiences, with the tag #IStandWithKamalHaasan trending on social media.

On 17 June, the Supreme Court of India advocated for the film's release in Karnataka, saying the law cannot be dictated by mob threats. However, the film's Karnataka distributors remained firm on not releasing the film there.
