= Harish Uthaman =

Indian actor

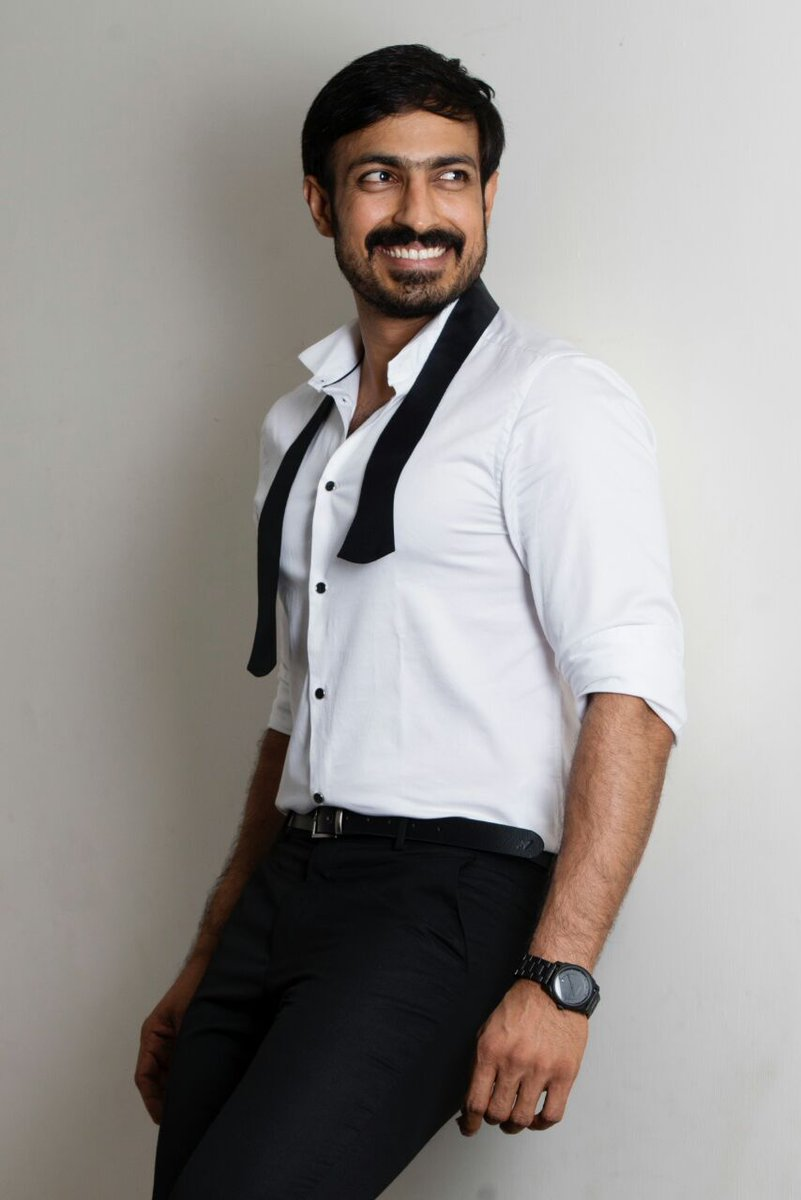
- Born: 5 April 1982 (age 44); Coimbatore, Tamil Nadu, India
- Occupation: Actor
- Years active: 2010 – present
- Spouse: Amrita Kalyanpur (m. 2018; div. 2019) Chinnu Kuruvila (m. 2022)

Harish Uthaman (born 5 April 1982) is an Indian actor who works in Tamil, Telugu, Malayalam, and Kannada films. He made his acting debut portraying the lead role in Tha (2010), before playing villains in Gouravam (2013), Pandiya Naadu (2013), Meagamann (2014), Power (2014) and Srimanthudu (2015).

== Personal life ==
Harish Uthaman was born in Coimbatore, Tamil Nadu, India to a Malayali family. He married Mumbai-based celebrity makeup artist Amrita Kalyanpur. Their wedding took place on 6 September 2018 at Guruvayur Temple, Kerala in an intimate traditional ceremony in the presence of friends and family. They got divorced in 2019. In 2022, he married Malayalam actress Chinnu Kuruvila.

== Career ==
Harish's first job was as a part of the cabin crew, working with Paramount Airways for three years and later with British Airways for three further years. He also briefly worked in a commercials company in Chennai before Suriya Prabhakaran, offered him the lead role in a film. Harish thus made his acting début with the low budget 2010 romantic Tamil film Tha, which opened to above average reviews. To prepare for his first role he grew his beard for five months, and did work to darken his skin by applying oil and sitting in the sunshine as per the role's demands. The film had a limited release and went unnoticed at the box office, and his performance was described as "apt" by critics. The film was later screened at the Tamil Film Festival in Norway, where Harish met Radha Mohan for the first time. Harish won the Best Newcomer Award at the festival. Subsequently, Radha Mohan cast Harish in a negative role in his bilingual film Gouravam (2013).

He was recommended to the director Suseenthiran for a role in Pandiya Naadu (2013) by Suriya Prabhakaran, his first director, and went on to gain critical acclaim for his performance in a villainous role. Today he does a lot of character and cop roles with all leading stars of south Indian industry. In the movie Nenjil Thunivirundhal (2017) he transformed his looks to suit the character. His movie Naandhi (2021) got huge response and his negative role got compliments like "We really Hate You". In 2022, he was seen in two films with Suseenthiran's Veerapandiyapuram and Kuttram Kuttrame. Harish Uthaman starred as lead role in thriller film, Noodles (2023). He played a key role in Kazhcha, one of the episodes in the Malayalam anthology series Manorathangal (2024). He was cast in the fantasy adventure movie Ajayante Randam Moshanam (2024) opposite Tovino Thomas.

== Filmography ==
Key
†	Denotes films that have not yet been released

=== Films ===
Year	Title	Role	Language	Notes
2010	Tha	Suriya	Tamil	Credited as Sri Hari; Norway Tamil Film Festival Awards for Best Newcomer
2013	Gouravam	Saravanan / Jagapathi	Tamil; Telugu	
2013	Mumbai Police	Roy	Malayalam	
2013	Pandiya Naadu	Bharani	Tamil	
2014	Meagamann	Guru	Tamil	
2014	Power	Kishore Vardhan / Chotu	Telugu	
2014	Pisasu	Angry husband	Tamil	
2015	Yagavarayinum Naa Kaakka	Guna	Tamil	
2015	Jil	ACP A. Parasuram	Telugu	
2015	Pandaga Chesko	Shiva Reddy's brother	Telugu	
2015	Srimanthudu	Radha	Telugu	
2015	Thani Oruvan	Suraj IPS	Tamil	
2015	Paayum Puli	Albert	Tamil	
2016	Express Raja	Keshav Reddy	Telugu	
2016	Krishna Gaadi Veera Prema Gaadha	Sunny	Telugu	
2016	Vil Ambu	Siva	Tamil	
2016	Malupu	Guna	Telugu	
2016	Thodari	Nandakumar	Tamil	
2016	Rekka	David	Tamil	
2016	Maaveeran Kittu	Selvaraj	Tamil	
2017	Bairavaa	Prabha	Tamil	
2017	Dora	Police Officer	Tamil	
2017	Mister	Meera's brother	Telugu	
2017	Duvvada Jagannadham	Sultan Basha	Telugu	
2017	Jai Lava Kusa	Jai's henchman	Telugu	
2017	Rubaai	Mani Sharma	Tamil	
2017	Nenjil Thunivirundhal	Durai Pandi	Tamil	
2017	C/o Surya	Sambasivudu	Telugu	
2017	Mayanadhi	Harish	Malayalam	
2018	Kavacham	Sarath Chandra IPS	Telugu	
2018	Naa Peru Surya	PC's brother	Telugu	
2019	Vinaya Vidheya Rama	Ballem Balaram	Telugu	
2019	Kodathi Samaksham Balan Vakeel	Ronald	Malayalam	
2019	Natpe Thunai	Shanmugham	Tamil	
2019	Rustum	Arjun Prasad	Kannada	
2019	Kalki	Ummar	Malayalam	
2019	Kaithi	Adaikalam	Tamil	
2020	Aswathama	Kishore	Telugu	
2020	V	Ranjith	Telugu	
2021	Eeswaran	S. I. Sabarinathan	Tamil	
2021	Naandhi	Kishore	Telugu	
2021	Ashvamithra	Arun	Tamil	
2021	Theerpugal Virkapadum	Rajendran	Tamil	
2022	Veerapandiyapuram	Madura	Tamil	
2022	Bheeshma Parvam	Martin	Malayalam	
2022	Kuttram Kuttrame	SI M. Naatrayan	Tamil	
2022	Vikram	Adaikalam	Tamil	
2022	Cadaver	ACP Vishal	Tamil	
2022	Captain	Karthi Devan	Tamil	
2022	Ini Utharam	SP Elavarasan	Malayalam	
2022	Sivudu		Telugu	Only dubbed version released
2023	Agilan	Nallaperumal	Tamil	
2023	B 32 Muthal 44 Vare	Vivek	Malayalam	
2023	Shaakuntalam	Asura Vikrodhanemi	Telugu	
2023	Noodles	Saravanan	Tamil	
2024	Bayamariya Brammai	Jagadish	Tamil	
2024	ARM	Sudev Varma	Malayalam	
2024	Kadaisi Ulaga Por	Prabhjoth Singh	Tamil	
2024	Kanguva	Atangkaali Udhiran	Tamil	
2025	Ramam Raghavam	Deva	Telugu	
2025	Phoenix	Ravichandran	Tamil	
2025	They Call Him OG	Dheenanath "Dheena"	Telugu	
2026	Mellisai		Tamil	
2026	Ramayana: Part 1	Vibhishana	Hindi	
2028	Ramayana: Part 2 †	Vibhishana	Hindi	

=== Web series ===
Year	Name	Role	Language	Network	Notes
2008-2009	Kolangal	Madhubalakrishnan "Madhu" - Musician (Menaka's Lover)	Sun TV	Tamil	from episode 1329
2020	Topless	Top	ZEE5	Tamil	
2022	Suzhal: The Vortex	Trilok Vadde	Amazon Prime Video	Tamil	
2024	Manorathangal	Vishwanathan	Malayalam	ZEE5	Anthology series; segment: Kazhcha

=== Voiceovers ===
Year	Film	Role	Actor	Notes
2023	Varisu	Jai Rajendran	Srikanth	
2024	Amaran	Altaf Baba	Shyrush Zutushi	Biopic of Mukund Varadarajan
