= Tha (film) =

- Film poster
- Directed by: R. K. Surya Prabhakar
- Written by: R. K. Surya Prabhakar
- Produced by: Rajesh Uthaman
- Starring: Harish Uthaman; Nisha
- Cinematography: V. S. Devaraj
- Edited by: Kasi Viswanathan
- Music by: Sri Vijay
- Production company: Shreya Films
- Release date: 3 December 2010
- Running time: 135 minutes
- Country: India
- Language: Tamil

Tha (transl. Give) is a 2010 Tamil-language romantic drama film written and directed by R. K. Surya Prabhakar and produced by Rajesh Uthaman. The film stars Harish Uthaman and Nisha, with Benito Franklin, Vetrivel, Madhankumar, Govindan, Shanmugam, Chellamuthu, K. K. P. Gopalakrishnan, and Vasanthi playing supporting roles. The film had musical score by Sri Vijay, cinematography by V. S. Devaraj, and editing by Kasi Viswanathan. The film released on 3 December 2010.

== Plot ==
The film is set in a small village near Coimbatore and begins with the groom Surya preparing to marry Jothi and narrating a flashback.

In a flashback, the young man Surya was a blue-collar worker in a metal workshop. His parents wanted him to marry, but Surya was shy, had low self-esteem, and his only social life was when he met his five friends, who were unlike him. Anbu is a photo studio owner and a married womanizer. Velliangiri is a carefree young man working in a cotton factory. Varathan is a loan lender who watches pornography and frequents prostitutes. Govindan is a middle-aged man who is an ardent fan of Kamal Haasan and desperately wants to get married. Shanmugam is a wastrel who tries to woo a village girl. Anbu advised Surya to follow his methods of wooing, but it failed miserably. Surya then watches adult films in a cinema theatre and goes to a brothel as Varathan did, but when a prostitute touches his hand, Surya flees.

Surya's parents then found him a girl: Jothi, a beautiful young woman who studied computer science. However, Jothi did not want to marry Surya: she found him not good-looking and not educated enough; above all else, she was afraid of him. Surya then tried to change his looks and behavior. The two were later engaged with the blessings of their families. Later, Surya, who became an overprotective fiancé, suspected her college mate Kishore of wooing Jothi and beat him up. Surya then tried to keep Anbu from his fiancée and one day revealed Anbu's seductive activities to his family, and the two got into a fight. Surya even suspected her uncle from Dubai of wooing Jothi. In the meantime, Jothi started to like Surya for being caring and protective. The day before the wedding, a tense Surya thrashed Jothi's uncle. Thus, the wedding was cancelled, and Jothi's father Chellamuthu wanted her to marry her uncle. Surya and his family returned home. A saddened Surya drank poison. Shortly after, he discovered that his wedding was not cancelled and then fainted. Surya was rushed to the hospital and died there.

Back to the present, Surya's body is buried in a cemetery, and it was his spirit who narrated the flashback, while Jothi mourns the loss of her fiancé at his grave.

== Cast ==
- Harish Uthaman as Surya (credited as Sri Hari)
- Nisha as Jothi
- Benito Franklin as Anbu
- Vetrivel as Velliangiri
- Madhankumar as Varathan
- Govindan as Govindan
- Shanmugam as Shanmugam
- Chellamuthu as Chellamuthu, Jothi's father
- K. K. P. Gopalakrishnan as Subramani, Surya's father
- Vasanthi as Surya's mother
- Kovai Madhan as Jothi's uncle
- J. Durairaj as Kishore
- Prabha
- Jagadeeshwari
- Dhenna
- Poorana
- Ajantha

== Production ==
Director R. K. Surya Prabhakar, who previously worked under Samuthirakani, met Harish Uthaman while meeting the latter's brother and asked if he would be interested in acting. Harish Uthaman was initially hesitant to play the lead role in the film and attended a twenty-day workshop to prepare for the film. He co-starred in the film alongside Nisha from Mumbai. Music composer Sri Vijay is a Sri Lankan Tamil who previously worked on a music album.

== Soundtrack ==
The film score and the soundtrack were composed by Sri Vijay. The soundtrack, released in 2010, features 6 tracks.

All tracks are written by R. K. Surya Prabhakar.

Track listing
No.	Title	Singer(s)	Length
1.	"Yedho Oru Eakkamo"	Jaya Raghavan, Swathy, Sowmya	03:59
2.	"Haiyo Haiyo"	Sri Vijay	03:09
3.	"Ennai Thottu Puttaa"	Jaya Raghavan	03:38
4.	"Emaai Thiranthen"	Kanthini Kishon, Sri Vijay	04:26
5.	"Thalaikku Melea Ullagam"	Ashwin Kumar, Harish Krishnamoorthy, James Mathew, Akshaya	04:29
6.	"Koottathile Vandhu"	V. M. Mahalingam, T. M. S. Kumar	03:05
Total length:			22:46

== Release and reception ==
The film was released on 3 December 2010. During a preview show, the film was well received by journalists, which gave false hope that the film would run well.

=== Reception ===
A critic from The New Indian Express wrote, "Tha is engaging and moving, and worth a watch".

=== Box office ===
The film's box office collections were affected by the heavy rain for the next three days. The film was subsequently removed from theaters with a plan for a re-release. The film was subsequently released at the Norway Tamil Film Festival, where Harish Uthaman won the award for Best Newcomer. Due to the film's failure, it took three years for Harish Uthaman to sign his next film.
