= Pushkar–Gayatri =

Indian film director duo

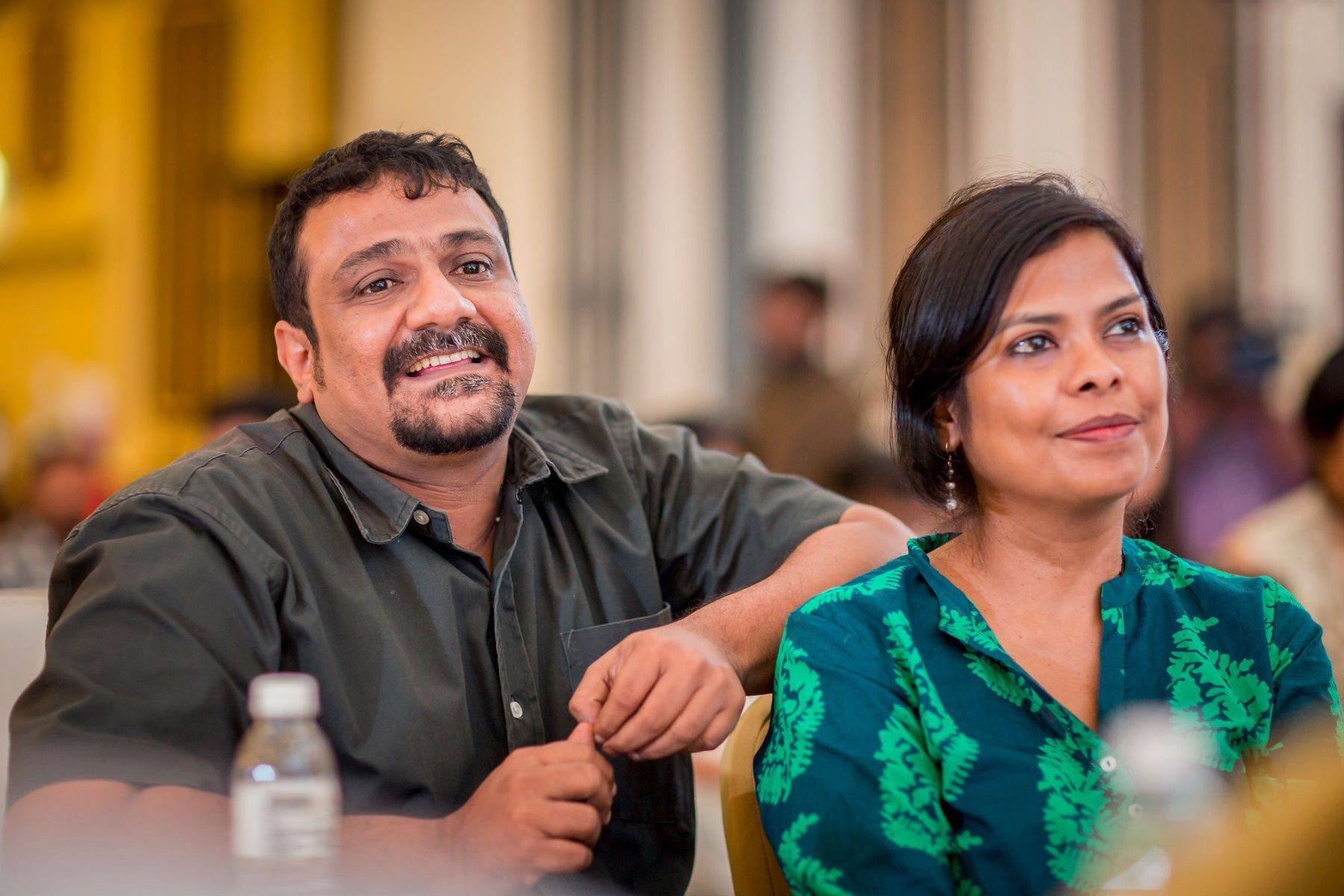
- Education: Master of Fine Arts in Film Making
- Alma mater: Under-Grad: Visual Communication from Loyola College, Chennai.
- Occupations: Writers, Directors and Screenwriters
- Years active: 2007 — present

Pushkar–Gayatri are a husband-and-wife filmmaker duo from Chennai, Tamil Nadu. Their works are noted for their unique style, technical finesse, and intricately woven storylines.

They started as writers and directors with the Tamil feature films – Oram Po (2007), and Va - Quarter Cutting (2010), both quirky dark comedies. In 2017, they wrote and directed Vikram Vedha, which swept the awards that year and was the top-rated Indian film of 2017 on IMDb. In 2022, they remade the critically acclaimed Vikram Vedha in Hindi with Hrithik Roshan and Saif Ali Khan. They made an entry as content creators in the streaming space with Suzhal: The Vortex, a tent-pole global show in Amazon Prime Video. They were the writers, show-runners, and producers of the show which won awards in India and abroad. Other notable works they have created include Aelay (2021), Vadhandhi: The Fable of Velonie (2022), Exam (2026), and Vadhandhi: The Mystery of Mani (upcoming).

== Personal life ==
Gayatri and Pushkar are born and brought up in Chennai, the city where they are currently based.

Pushkar completed his schooling from St. John's Senior Secondary School, Mandaveli (CBSE).

They did their under-graduation in Visual Communication in Loyola College, Chennai, where they first met.

During and after graduation, they worked with eminent advertising filmmakers such as P.C.Sriram and Manav Menon. They decided to pursue their education further and applied to film schools in the U.S. Gayatri finished her Masters in Fine Art from the University of Chicago, and Pushkar finished his Masters in Film Marking from the University of New Orleans.

The two started their careers together with ad-filmmaking. Neither of them are from a film background. To approach producers, they came up with a short-film version of the script of their first film, Oram Po. From then on, they have been full-time feature filmmakers in Tamil. With the release of the Vikram Vedha remake in Hindi, they debuted their entrance to Bollywood.

== Production ==
Under their production house Wallwatcher Films, Pushkar and Gayatri have produced two long-format web series, Suzhal: The Vortex and Vadhandhi: The Fable of Velonie, for Amazon Prime Video, and a feature film, Aelay, on Netflix. Pushkar and Gayatri curate all their projects under Wallwatcher Films and they mentor them as creative producers.

== Filmography ==
†	Denotes films that have not yet been released

- Note: all films are in Tamil, unless otherwise noted.

=== As directors ===
Year	Work	Notes
2007	Oram Po	
2010	Va- Quarter Cutting	
2017	Vikram Vedha	
2022	Vikram Vedha	Hindi film

=== As producers ===
Year	Work	Roles	Notes
2021	Aelay	Creative producers	Netflix film

=== Television ===
Year	Work	Roles	Notes
2022–2025	Suzhal: The Vortex	Creators, writers	Amazon original series
2022	Vadhandhi: The Fable of Velonie	Creative producers	Amazon original series
2026	Exam	Creative producers	Amazon original series
2026	Vadhandhi: The Mystery of Mani	Creative producers	Amazon original series

== Awards ==
Film	Awards	Category	Result	Ref.
Vikram Vedha	Ananda Vikatan Awards	Best Screenplay	Won	
Vikram Vedha	Tamil Nadu State Award 2017	Best Director	Won	
Vikram Vedha	65th Filmfare Awards South	Best Director	Won	
Vikram Vedha	Chennai International Film Festival	Second Best Tamil Feature Film	Won	
Vikram Vedha	Norway Tamil Film Festival Awards 2018	Best Screenplay	Won	
Vikram Vedha	Techofes Awards 2018	Best Director	Nominated	
Vikram Vedha	Techofes Awards 2018	Best Story	Won	
Vikram Vedha	10th Vijay Awards	Best Director	Won	
Vikram Vedha	10th Vijay Awards	Best Screenplay	Won	
Vikram Vedha	Behindwoods Awards	Best Director	Won	
7th SIIMA Awards	Best Film	Won		
Suzhal: The Vortex	OTT Play Awards 2022	Best Screenplay (Series)	Won	
Suzhal: The Vortex	E4M Awards	Best Thriller-horror show on web OTT platform	Silver	
Suzhal: The Vortex	E4M Awards	Best Writer	Silver	
Suzhal: The Vortex	Asian Academy Creative Awards 2022	Best Drama series	Won	
Suzhal: The Vortex	Indian Telly Streaming Awards 2022	Best Regional Series	Won	
Suzhal: The Vortex	Afaqs Vdonxt Awards 2023	Best Music Video	Won	
Suzhal: The Vortex	Adgully Screenxx Awards 2022	Best Content - Thriller	Won	
Suzhal: The Vortex	Indian Film Festival of Melbourne 2023	Best Series	Nominated	
Suzhal: The Vortex	Critics' Choice Shorts and Series Awards, India 2023	Best Series	Nominated	
Suzhal: The Vortex	Critics' Choice Shorts and Series Awards, India 2023	Best Writing	Nominated	
