= Suzhal: The Vortex =

- Genre: Crime thriller
- Created by: Pushkar–Gayathri
- Written by: Pushkar–Gayathri
- Directed by: Season 1&2: Bramma G Season 1: Anucharan Murugaiyan; Season 2: Sarjun KM
- Starring: Kathir; Aishwarya Rajesh
- Music by: Sam C. S.
- Country of origin: India
- Original language: Tamil
- No. of seasons: 2
- No. of episodes: 16

Production
- Cinematography: Season 1: Mukeswaran; Season 2: Abraham Joseph
- Editor: A. Richard Kevin
- Running time: 40-50 minutes
- Production company: Wallwatcher Films

Original release
- Network: Amazon Prime Video; Kalaignar TV (syndication)
- Release: 17 June 2022 – present

Suzhal: The Vortex is an Indian Tamil-language crime suspense thriller television series created by Pushkar–Gayathri which was an Amazon Original and premiered exclusively on Amazon Prime Video. The series was directed by Bramma G (both seasons), Anucharan Murugaiyan (first season) and Sarjun KM (second season) and produced by Wallwatcher Films. It stars Kathir and Aishwarya Rajesh in lead roles.

The series features music composed by Sam C.S., cinematography handled by Mukeswaran (first season) and Abraham Joseph (second season), and editing done by Richard Kevin. Arun Venjaramoodu was production designer for both seasons.The first season, consisting of eight episodes, was released on 17 June 2022. The second season, consisting of eight episodes, was released on 28 February 2025.

== Premise ==
Season 1

In the fictional town of Sambaloor but actually set up in Poombarai, Dindigul district, Tamil Nadu, lives a community that worships Goddess Angalamman. The community celebrates the Mayana Kollai festival over 10 days every year, and it is in these 10 days that this story unfolds. What starts out as parallel stories of kidnapping and arson of Nandhini (starring Aishwarya Rajesh) and her sister, Fire Accident taking place at The Cement Factory, The Sub Inspector Chakravarthy (alias) Sakkarai (starring Kathir) sets out to unveil the suspense and knots tied to both the incidents, later unfolds into childhood trauma and conspiracy.

Season 2

Chakravarthy, being disturbed by the incidents and the guilty feeling of not being able to find Justice to Nandhini, seeks the help of Chellappa, his well wisher. Chellappa, the distinguished lawyer who is a senior Social activist and a public prosecutor renowned for his unwavering support in advocating for Nandini's defense, is tragically discovered dead under mysterious circumstances, Sakkarai is urgently summoned to offer his assistance to the grieving family during their time of shock and loss. As the investigation unfolds, it is set against the vibrant and festive backdrop of the grand Ashtakaali Festival, held annually in the town of Kaalipattanam. With each passing day, the inquiry delves deeper into the past, gradually revealing long-buried secrets and unresolved tensions that threaten to resurface, casting an ominous and unsettling shadow over the present and complicating the pursuit of justice.

== Cast ==
Main lead

- Kathir as Sub-inspector Chakravarthy “Sakkarai”, Nandini's friend
- Aishwarya Rajesh as Nandini (Based on the Goddess Angalamman)

Season 1

- R. Parthiban as Shanmugam, Nandini's father
- Sriya Reddy as Inspector Regina Thomas
- Gopika Ramesh as Nila (Shanmugam's younger daughter)
- Fredrick Jhonson as Adhisayam (Regina's son)
- Harish Uthaman as Trilok Vadde
- Prem Kumar as Vadivelu (Regina's husband)
- Elango Kumaravel as Guna
- Nivedhithaa Sathish as Lakshmi (Sakkarai's fiancée)
- Indumathy Manikandan as Devi
- Latha Rao as Selvi (Guna's wife)
- Yusuf Hussain as Mukesh Vadde
- Nitish Veera as Pushparaj
- Santhana Bharathi as Kothandaraman
- Mekha Rajan as Dr. Sanghamithra (psychiatrist)
- Palani Murugan as Eeshwaran
- Soundarya as Malar (Nila's friend)
- Ajith Koshy as DSP Manimaran
- Navneeth Krishnan as Gani
- Yashwanth Babu as Mani
- G Ajith Kumar as Kandipan
- Hareesh SS as Dheena
- Sasi Kumar as Arivu
- Arun Pandiyan as Muthu
- Prasanna Balachandran as Sundaram
- Mona Kakade as a hospital doctor

Season 2

- Lal as Adv Chellappa
- Saravanan as Inspector Moorthy
- Ashwini Nambiar as Malathy (Chellappa's wife)
- Amit Bhargav as Sundar (Chellappa's son)
- Manjima Mohan as Nagamma (Based on the Goddess Nagamman)
- Chandran as Ravi
- Chandini Tamilarasan as Prayamvatha (School Principal)
- Gouri G. Kishan as Muthu aka Madhubala. A stage dancer (Based on the Goddess Muthumariamman)
- Monisha Blessy as Muppi. A salesgirl who works in optical shop (Based on the Goddess Muppidariamman)
- Samyuktha Viswanathan as Naachi. An agriculturist.(Based on the Goddess Alagu Nachiamman) (Voice dubbed by Smruthi K)
- Rajapandi as Sub-inspector
- Harini Sundarajan as Adv.Gaandhari. A criminal lawyer (Based on the Goddess Gaandhariamman)
- Nikhila Shankar as Sandhanam. A trainee paramedic (Based on the Goddess Santhanamaariamman)
- Srisha as Veera. A basketball player (Based on the Goddess Veeramahakaaliamman)
- Kalaivani Bhaskar as Ulagu. A devoted girl (Based on the Goddess Ulagamman)
- Abhirami Bose as Senbagam. A ration shop owner (Based on the Goddess Shenbagavalliamman)
- Attul as Dhamu
- Anjali Ameer as Vanaja
- O. A. K. Sundar as Thiruvengadam
- Aroul D. Shankar as Mithran
- Pondy Ravi as MLA Arasu
- Arshya Lakshman as Saroja (Prisoner)
- S. Rajapandi as Sub Inspector (who arresting sex workers)
- Telephone Raj as Fernandes (Fishermen 's head)
- Thirumurugan as Maarappan

== Series overview ==
Season	Episodes	Originally released
1	8	June 17, 2022
2	8	February 28, 2025

== Episodes ==
=== Season 1 ===
No.	Title	Directed by	Written by	Release
1	"Hoisting the Flag"	Bramma G	Pushkar–Gayathri	17 June 2022
Shanmugam (Parthiban) is the head of the labor union protesting against their factory's management, headed by Trilok Vadde (Harish Uthaman). Police under Inspector Regina Thomas (Sriya Reddy) and her close associate Sub-Inspector Chakravarthy aka Sakkarai (Kathir) try to keep the protestors in check. In return, Trilok partly finances a bike for Regina's spoiled son, Adhisayam. Regina's husband is a little unhappy about the entire setup. Adhisayam is headed on a trip to Moonaar with his friends. Sakkarai gets engaged to Lakshmi (Nivedhithaa Sathish), a nurse. Shanmugam's notices his daughter Nila (Gopika Ramesh) is not concentrating on her education and reprimands her. Nila seems extremely upset. She goes missing that night. The same night, the factory catches fire and suspicion naturally falls on Shanmugam and police detain him. While investigating the cause of the factory fire, Sakkarai finds out Nila was actually kidnapped.
2	"The Myth"	Bramma G	Pushkar–Gayathri	17 June 2022
Trilok twists the arm of Regina and asks her to formally arrest Shanmugam. But Trilok's father Mukesh, who trusts Shanmugam, interferes and facilitates his release. News of Nila's kidnapping becomes official. Nila's sister Nadhini (Aishwarya Rajesh), who is also Sakkarai's school friend, helps him with the search. Sakkarai finds out Nila was being stalked by a young and apparently rich boy. Police investigation also led them to Malar, who Nila met last before being abducted. They try to question her, but Malar's family appear to be hiding a secret and doesn't cooperate. But after persistent pressure Malar reveals to Sakkarai and Nandhini that the guy stalking Nila is actually Regina's son, Adhisayam.
3	"The Procession"	Bramma G	Pushkar–Gayathri	17 June 2022
Shanmugam and family confront Regina about Adhisayam kidnapping Nila. Regina tries to calm them down by playing his innocent sounding voice messages he sent just that day. But Malar insists Adhisayam has tried to misbehave with Nila. Regina tries to call Adhisayam, but can reach only one of the other friends. She strongly asks them to return from Munaar right away. Fire investigator Kothandaraman questions Trilok about the history of the factory and its financials. Regina tracks Adhisaysm's phone and finds out he had called Nila several times the day she went missing. Since none of the boys are returning phone calls, Sakkarai offers to go to Munaar to investigate. He is surprised to find Nandhini there, who is also looking for clues on Nila. With help from local police, they track down Adhisayam's van and his hideout. They catch all the friends, but no sign of Adhisayam or Nila.
4	"The Immersion"	Bramma G	Pushkar–Gayathri	17 June 2022
Shanmugam and his group lose patience and force their way into Regina's house. Nandhini and Sakkarai return just in time to stop them, and reveal Adhisayam and Nila are actually in love with each other, and eloped to Mumbai. From the phone he got from the other boys, Sakkarai plays a series of voice messages Adhisayam had recorded for Regina. Adhisayam recounts his romance with Nila through those messages, and mentions they decided to elope because of the personal enmity between Regina and Shanmugam. Sakkarai opines to Nandhini personally that he always thought of Adhisayam as a happy-go-lucky guy, but these messages appeared to come from a wiser person. Regina and her husband blame each other, but Shanmugam seems to repent for his mistakes. Police check the train schedule. They find the names of Nila and Adhisayam on the reservation charts, but on a train to Guwahati, and not Mumbai. Ticket inspector cannot recall them either. Meanwhile, an idol is immersed in the local lake as part of the Mayana Kollai festival. Little kids are shown jumping into the lake and swimming underwater around the immersed idol. We also see the dead bodies of Nila and Adhisayam at the bottom of the lake, hugging each other.
5	"The Looting"	Anucharan Murugaiyan	Pushkar–Gayathri	17 June 2022
The bodies of Nila and Adhisayam are recovered and taken to post mortem, where it is discovered that Nila was pregnant, and the deaths were caused by slitting of the throat with a sharp object. Time of death is estimated to be around the same day Nila went missing. Trilok visits Regina to offer his condolences, and offers to help any which way possible. Fire inspector Kothandaraman meets him there and warns if an inspection of the factory is performed, that could discover an unmaintained item, which would invalidate insurance claims. Trilok leaves in a huff. Regina visits Shanmugam and requests the last rites of both Nila and Adhisayam be performed together, and Shanmugam and family agree. Sakkarai notices Nila's tutor Pushparaj looking for something in her garden. Pushparaj realizes he is being followed and escapes in his motorbike. Sakkarai searches around the garden and discovers Nila's hidden cellphone. He unlocks the phone with Nandhini's help, and they find out Nila was quite active on social media, contrary to their beliefs. The also find out Nila was obsessed with the disappearance of another local girl Ammani, several years ago. Police trace Pushparaj's bike near the venue of a procession for Mayana Kollai. Shanmugam's brother Guna is playing a major role that day. Sakkai catches Pushparaj there and finds out he was looking for the phone because it contains pictures of him being intimate with Guna's wife, Selvi. Pushparaj claims Nila had taken those photos, black mailed him to the tune of Rs. 2 lakhs, got the money and left with Adhisayam accompanying her.
6	"The Trance"	Anucharan Murugaiyan	Pushkar–Gayathri	17 June 2022
Lakshmi suspects Sakkarai has romantic feelings towards Nandhini, but he assures her there is nothing like that. Regina is not handling her loss well, and her marriage is strained. Vadde's and their accountant Vadivelu (Regina's husband) discuss the company cannot survive unless the damages are covered by insurance, and Kothandaraman's report is crucial. Kothandaraman investigates the burnt down factory with Sakkarai and Guna, and discovers a few items not in compliance. The office who investigated from the police side, admits his report was completely based on Trilok's suggestion. Guna develops asthma symptoms and leaves the factory. Sakkarai suspects if the attack was triggered by anxiety over the investigation. Sniffing dogs lead police to some caves near the lake, where they see signs of a ritual and traces of blood, and suspect if the kids were sacrificed for Mayana Kollai. Sakkarai finds a tent where a recluse called Eswaran lives, and discovers a box with Rs 2 lakhs. Police arrest Eswaran and interrogate him. They find out Ammani was his sister, and became deranged after she went missing. He admits Nila and Adhisayam offered his Rs 2 lakhs to kill someone, which he refused, but still snatched their money. Forensic reports confirms the traces of blood in the cave is from a goat and Eswaran is probably innocent. Sakkarai and Nandhina find out the DNA analysis of the fetus in Nila's womb reveals it is not Adhisayam's. Doctor suspects Nila was subjected to sexual abuse. Nandhini passes out on hearing this.
7	"Firewalker"	Anucharan Murugaiyan	Pushkar–Gayathri	17 June 2022
Nandhini seems to be recovering in the hospital, but suddenly remembers something and passes out again. Nandhini's psychiatrist visiting from Coimbatore mentions she has been conseling her for some time and Nandhini has some bottled up emotions that she is not venting. Sakkarai is constantly monitoring her recovery, much to the chagrin of Lakshmi, who is a nurse in the same hospital. Kothandaraman, having spotted a can of thinner at the burnt factory, suspects that could have been used to start the fire and investigates local paint stores. He seems to find a lead. Police use dummies and determine the cliff from where the bodies of Nila and Adhisayam could have been thrown into the lake. They also find a long bladed knife there, with blood stains that match that of the victims. Sakkarai thinks Nila must have somehow coerced her abuser to meet her at the cliff and tried to kill him with Adhisayam's help. But the abuser must have killed them and escaped. Investigation of Nila's social media profile leads Sakkarai to believe someone is stalking everyone in her kho-kho club. He goes to the school to dig further, and finds the Trilok there, who happens to be the club's sponsor. He is shown touching and hugging girls in the club and Sakkari get hold of a bottle with his finger prints, hoping they will match those on the knife found at the cliff. He also finds out Trilok has a guest house and breaks in. He is shocked to find large prints of pictures that he saw earlier on Nila's phone. He presents the info to his superior, but gets berated for breaking in without warrant. Finger print results are not conclusive either. Frustrated, he shares the info with Regina and Shanmugam and leaves to monitor Trilok's guest house. He sees Trilok leave with a woman, and follows them. Trilok drops the woman at Mayana Kollai is accost by Regina and Shanmugam on the way back, who beat him up blue. Sakkarai follows the lady and finds out she is a transgender person, and just a friend of Trilok. She also reveals Trilok is gay, and has no interest in women. Convinced, Sakkari rushes back in time to stop Regina and Shanmugam from killing Trilok.
8	"The Silence"	Anucharan Murugaiyan	Pushkar–Gayathri	17 June 2022
Nandhini has a counseling session with her psychiatrist. Later, she dreams about Nila being abused. Suddenly she sees herself in Nila's clothes being abused and wakes up with a jolt. Trilok is unconscious at the hospital with his father recollecting how hesitant Trilok was to take over the factory. It is revealed Trilok was never interested in money. Kothandaraman confronts Mukesh Vadde with his findings and accuses him of conspiring with Regina (who bought the paint thinner) and Shanmugam (who used the thinner to start the fire). Mukesh admits the charge and explains they did that to get the insurance money to compensate the employees, and their children. He repents for his sins, and mentions karma already got back to all three of them. Regina and Shanmugam turn themselves in for assaulting Trilok. Kothandaraman concludes his report recommending an insurance payoff. Nandhini is missing from the hospital. Sakkarai learns from her psychiatrist that Nandhini was also abused as a child, but his identity is buried deep in her mind. Lakshmi suggests the same person could have molested both Nandhini and Nila. Sakkarai finds out Nandhini came to his house and took his gun. He is now convinced Nandhini is planning to kill her molester. Sakkarai goes to Nandhini's house to look for clues and sees Selvi alone there. Talking to her, he finds out her husband Guna was out of reach around the same time when Nila went missing. Selvi also mentions Nandhini and Nila used to spend a lot of time with their uncle when they were young, but stopped as soon as they reached adolescence. Sakkarai realizes Guna was the person abusing them and tries to trace his phone. Nandhini is at the cliff with the revolver, and Guna arrives there to meet her. He mentions Nila had called him to the same spot the day when she went missing, just like what Nandhini did now. Apparently, Nila and Adhisayam tried to kill Guna with the knife, and during the fight, Guna had killed them. He manages to soft talk Nandhini into a trance, but Sakkarai arrives and fights him. Nandhini wakes up from her trance and empties the gun at Guna. At the same time, Mayana Kollai concludes with the Goddess killing the demon.

=== Season 2 ===
No.	Title	Directed by	Written by	Release
1	"The Beginnings"	Bramma G	Pushkar–Gayathri	28 February 2025
Nandini (Aishwarya Rajesh) is on trial for Guna's murder, defended by respected lawyer Chellappa (Lal), a father figure to Sakkarai (Kathir). Chellappa is also revered by other sections of the society and people seems to accept his solution for a local issue. Chellappa invites Sakkarai to the Ashtakaali festival but is soon found dead in a locked cottage with a missing gun. Sakkarai becomes the investigating officer, creating tension with Inspector Moorthy. Sakkarai and the police find a badly bruised girl with a gun inside a locked cupboard inside the house.
2	"The Confluence"	Bramma G	Pushkar–Gayathri	28 February 2025
Sakkarai is unable to extract any information from the woman from the crime scene, but learns her name is Muthu (Gouri G. Kishan) and she is a dancer at temple festivities. He also finds out Chellappa had an argument with Thiruvengadam, who is powerful locally, regarding the dancers. News about the killing and the arrest leaks out and 7 seemingly unconnected women turn themselves in to the police, claiming they killed Chellappa.
3	"The Outliers"	Sarjun KM	Pushkar–Gayathri	28 February 2025
A verbatim confession from the 7 young women who surrendered at different police stations, each claiming to have killed Chellappa sends Sakkarai's head spinning. They don't offer a motive; nor explain how they escaped from Chellappa's house that was locked inside. All 7 women + Muthu are transferred to the same jail as Nandhini. Sakkarai requests Nandini to be his eyes and ears in the sub-jail the women are lodged in. In lieu of the festival, a low-key funeral is held for the grand man, Chellappa.
4	"The Knot"	Sarjun KM	Pushkar–Gayathri	28 February 2025
Chellappa's driver Dhamu (who also plays major roles in the temple rituals) behaves a little mysteriously and Sakkarai confronts him. After a brief chase, Dhamu escapes on a motor boat. Sakkarai alerts the police to look out for Dhamu. Sakkarai finds out Chellappa was in a legal battle against Prayamvadha (Chandini Tamilarasan), the correspondent of a private school. Chellappa's phone call log reveals she was the last person to call him before his death. Sakkarai questions her about the women in custody, but Prayamvadha rebuffs him. Nandhini interacts with the "killers" and discovers they all grew up in a hostel during school days. Sakkarai investigates this and finds out a trust headed by Prayamvadha was supporting them all along. Sakkarai confronts Prayamvadha with this info, and she reveals Chellappa had forced her to support them. Nandhini continues to spy on the 8 women and finds out they are sneaking out of the prison cell in the night. She follows them to a dilapidated building inside the prison premises, and sees them together performing some kind of a cultic ritual.
5	"The Conundrum"	Sarjun KM	Pushkar–Gayathri	28 February 2025
A stage play in the festival reinstates Sakkarai's resolve to find the young women justice. Sakkarai finds a pathbreaking lead at the crime site. With fresh forensic reports, he imagines the sequence of events on the fateful night. Dhamu's shocking confession solidifies Sakkarai's new image of Chellappa. The young women in the prison pull a risky stunt. Nandini and Sakkarai get the women to talk.
6	"The Guardians"	Bramma G	Pushkar–Gayathri	28 February 2025
10 years ago: Ravi (Chandran) and Naagamma (Manjima Mohan) are a happy, loving couple from the fishing community. Naagamma's world turns topsy-turvy when she discovers Ravi's dark secrets. She takes an extreme measure to set things right. Risking her life, she takes up the role of a protector. Chellappa gets sucked into the vortex in an effort to help Naagamma's efforts to restore a broken path.
7	"The Unravel"	Bramma G	Pushkar–Gayathri	28 February 2025
Sakkarai learns that Chellappa has been trying to crack and nab the kingpin of the human trafficking ring for the past 10 years. Shared grief brings Sundar and Dhamu closer. A shocking development sends Sakkarai on a time sensitive chase. The 8 women finally reveal their story from the night of the murder. The elusive Arakkan prepares for battle, putting the 8 women in grave danger.
8	"The Sublime"	Bramma G	Pushkar–Gayathri	28 February 2025
Sakkarai fixates on the case and nails Chellappa's killer. With the identity of their Arakkan revealed, the 8 women gear up for revenge, but their Arakkan puts up a formidable fight. Sakkarai goes on an epic chase to save the newly trafficked kids. Just as the festival goers wash away their past, Sakkarai, Nandhini and the 8 women are presented an opportunity to let go of their past and start anew.

== Music ==
The music is composed by Sam C. S. The first season consist of 13 songs. The second season consist of 18 songs.

Season 1

Suzhal – The Vortex (Original Series Soundtrack)

Soundtrack album by Sam C. S.
- Released: 13 June 2022
- Recorded: 2021
- Genre: Amazon Original Series Soundtrack
- Language: Tamil
- Label: Sony Music India

Singles from Suzhal: The Vortex
- 1. "Duvaa Duvaa" Released: 14 June 2022

No.	Title	Lyrics	Singers	Length
1.	"Maaya Maaya"			2:38
2.	"Duvaa Duvaa"	Kaber Vasuki	Sam C. S., Andrea Jeremiah, Jonita Gandhi, Lavita Lobo, Arivu	3:28
3.	"Naan Unnodu Dhaan"			2:08
4.	"Suzhal – The Whisper of the Vortex"	Kaber Vasuki		2:01
5.	"Yaen Marandhaai"	Vithya Damodaran	Srinisha Jayaseelan	2:44
6.	"Yennai Sidhaithaaye"			2:24
7.	"Hey Kannaa"		Bhuvana Ananth	1:50
8.	"Oorellaam Poo Pookka"		Bhuvana Ananth	1:56
9.	"Father's Remorse Theme"			1:24
10.	"The Quest for Truth Theme"			1:12
11.	"The Goddess Descends Theme"			2:22
12.	"Darkness Engulfs the Soul Theme"			1:33
13.	"The Suzhal Roar"			0:51
Total length:				26:12

Season 2

Suzhal – The Vortex 2 (Original Series Soundtrack)

Soundtrack album by Sam C. S.
- Released: 24 February 2025
- Recorded: 2024
- Genre: Amazon Original Series Soundtrack
- Language: Tamil
- Label: T-Series

No.	Title	Lyrics	Singers	Length
1.	"Aalangatti Mazhai"	Sam C. S.	Kapil Kapilan	2:34
2.	"Ambur Dum Biryani"	Viveka	Anthony Daasan	2:48
3.	"Saaya Gopurame"	Viveka	Sam C. S.	3:50
4.	"Chilla Chilla"	Viveka	Sam C. S.	2:20
5.	"Ashtakaali"	Sam C. S.	Diwakar, Sam C. S.	5:19
6.	"Arakkan Arangettram"	Sam C. S.	Sam C. S.	3:35
7.	"Soorasamhaaram"	Viveka	Sam C. S.	4:17
8.	"Nagakanni"	Sam C. S.	Sam C. S.	2:30
9.	"Maadane Sudalamadane"	Sam C. S.	Sam C. S.	3:00
10.	"The Chase"	Instrumental	Sam C. S.	0:52
11.	"The Commencement"	Instrumental	Sam C. S.	2:25
12.	"The Genesis"	Instrumental	Sam C. S.	1:28
13.	"The Longing"	Instrumental	Sam C. S.	0:43
14.	"The Penitentiary"	Instrumental	Sam C. S.	2:11
15.	"The Redeemer"	Instrumental	Sam C. S.	1:18
16.	"The Salvation"	Instrumental	Sam C. S.	1:44
17.	"The Secret"	Instrumental	Sam C. S.	0:51
18.	"The Tunnel"	Instrumental	Sam C. S.	1:28
Total length:				42:43

== Release ==
The series has been released in over 30 languages through subtitles and has been dubbed in Hindi, Telugu, Malayalam, Kannada, English, French, German, Italian, Japanese, Polish, Portuguese, Castilian Spanish, Latin Spanish, Arabic, and Turkish.

== Reception ==
The first season received critical acclaim. On the review aggregator website Rotten Tomatoes, 100% of 10 critics' reviews are positive, with an average rating of 10/10.

The second season received mixed reviews. On the review aggregator website Rotten Tomatoes, 50% of 6 critics' reviews are positive, with an average rating of 6/10.

Saibal Chatterjee of NDTV rated the series 4 out of 5 stars and wrote, "The Vortex sets a benchmark that will take some doing to emulate". Logesh Balachandran of The Times Of India rated the series 4 out of 5 stars and wrote, "Suzhal is an intense investigative thriller that has a lot of surprises in store, making it a perfect bingewatch for the weekend". Divya Nair of Rediff rated the series 4 out of 5 stars and wrote "Even though each episode is about an hour long, you won't even blink". Srivatsan S of The Hindu wrote, "A terrific star cast makes this layered series all the more effective", further adding that, "this is a rare series where the sum and parts are equally great". Nandini Ramnath writing for Scroll.in called the series "a nail-biting thriller about secrets & deceptions".

The series received criticism from Manoj Kumar B of Indian Express, who though praised the series for seemingly "being like a huge jump by the standards of Tamil soap operas", also criticised it for not being good enough to match the global standards & stated that the "show's creators have barely scratched the surface with this format of storytelling". Janani K of India Today rated the series 2.5 out of 5 stars and wrote, "Aishwarya Rajesh, Kathir's series sucks you right in but fizzles", though she praised the climax by writing that, "Pushkar and Gayatri's Suzhal imparts a much-needed message in the climax, which is relevant to society".

== Awards and recognitions ==
S.no	Name of the award	Category	Nominee	Result
1	HT OTT Play Awards 2022	Best Screenplay (Series)	Pushkar–Gayathri	
2	OTT Play Changemakers Awards 2023	Inspiring Performer of the Year	Aishwarya Rajesh	
3	E4M Awards	Best thriller-horror show on web OTT platform	Suzhal: The Vortex	Silver
3	E4M Awards	Best Webseries Tamil	Suzhal: The Vortex	Silver
3	E4M Awards	Best Writer	Pushkar–Gayathri	Silver
3	E4M Awards	Best Editor	Richard Kevin A	Gold
3	E4M Awards	Best Cinematographer	Mukeswaran	Gold
3	E4M Awards	Best Performance Female (Regional)	Sriya Reddy	Bronze
3	E4M Awards	Best Performance Female (Regional)	Aishwarya Rajesh	Bronze
3	E4M Awards	Best Performance Male (Regional)	Kathir (actor)	Silver
3	E4M Awards	Best Actor in a Supporting Role (Male)	R. Parthiban	Silver
4	Asian Academy Creative Awards	India National Winner 2022 - Best drama series	Suzhal: The Vortex	
5	Indian Telly Streaming Awards	Best Director - Regional Series	Bramma G and Anucharan Murugaiyan	
5	Indian Telly Streaming Awards	Best Actress	Sriya Reddy	
5	Indian Telly Streaming Awards	Best Supporting Actress	Aishwarya Rajesh	
5	Indian Telly Streaming Awards	Best Regional Series 2022	Suzhal: The Vortex	
6	Afaqs Vdonxt Awards 2023	Best Music Video	''Duvaa Duvaa'' from Suzhal: The Vortex	Gold
7	Adgully Screenxx Awards 2022	Best Content - Thriller	Suzhal: The Vortex	Gold
