= Mahaan (2022 film) =

2022 Indian Tamil-language action thriller film

- Official release poster
- Directed by: Karthik Subbaraj
- Written by: Karthik Subbaraj
- Produced by: S. S. Lalit Kumar
- Starring: Vikram; Dhruv Vikram; Simran; Bobby Simha
- Cinematography: Shreyaas Krishna
- Edited by: Vivek Harshan
- Music by: Santhosh Narayanan
- Production company: Seven Screen Studio
- Distributed by: Amazon Prime Video
- Release date: 10 February 2022
- Running time: 162 minutes
- Country: India
- Language: Tamil

Mahaan (transl. The Great One) is a 2022 Indian Tamil-language action thriller film directed by Karthik Subbaraj and produced by S. S. Lalit Kumar under Seven Screen Studio. It stars Vikram and Dhruv Vikram, alongside Simran, Bobby Simha, Sananth, Vettai Muthukumar, Deepak Paramesh and Aadukalam Naren. The film revolves around Gandhi Mahaan's journey from a commerce teacher to a liquor baron, but his journey takes a twist when his son Dadabhai Naoroiji, an extremist Gandhian, vows revenge on Gandhi Mahaan for violating the Gandhian principles and abandoning his family.

The film was announced on 1 June 2020 under the working title Chiyaan 60, marking Vikram's 60th film as a leading actor. The official title, Mahaan, was revealed on 20 August 2021. The music was composed by Santhosh Narayanan, with cinematography and editing being handled by Shreyaas Krishna and Vivek Harshan. Principal photography began on 10 March 2021 but was halted due to the COVID-19 pandemic. Filming resumed on 6 July 2021 and wrapped up on 14 August 2021. Due to the delays of the film, a few incomplete scenes were cut from the final runtime of 3 hours, which were later released on the 100th day of release.

Mahaan premiered directly on Amazon Prime Video on 10 February 2022. It received generally positive reviews from critics.

== Plot ==
1968: Mohandoss is a middle-aged liquor-ban activist whose 12-year-old son Gandhi Mahaan is the exact opposite of him and is addicted to gambling. Sathyavan Soosaiyappan is his friend, who gambles against Gnanodhayam. Gandhi is a prodigy at gambling and always helps Sathya win matches. One time, Sathya keeps losing and confronts Gandhi, who tells him he has no choice but to make him lose because Gnanam kidnapped his dog Joker. Everyone fights over it, and their parents have to interfere. Mohandoss makes Gandhi promise to lead the liquor-ban movement and live as a "Mahaan".

1996: Gandhi is a 40-year-old commerce teacher at the local government school. He is married to Nachi and has a son, Dada. On his official birthday, Gandhi leaves for a temple to give alms, where he meets a beggar, Manickam, who tells him that the former leads a life like 95% of people with morals or principles, but cannot lead a life like 5% of people, who do not follow morals or principles in life. At night, Gandhi remembers Manickam's words when Nachi tells Gandhi that she and her friends are going on a trip to Tirupati. Gandhi uses this as an opportunity to enjoy his real birthday the next day and goes to a bar, where he meets one of his old students, Rakesh Christopher alias Rocky, who decides to help him fulfill his dreams.

Gandhi is then taken to Rocky's father Sathya, who owns the bar, where Gandhi plays rummy and wins a lot of money. Sathya recognizes Gandhi as his childhood friend due to the scar. The next morning, Gandhi returns home late; Nachi deduces he has drunk and leaves him, taking Dada with her, since Gandhi broke the rule of never drinking. Gandhi goes to Nachi's house multiple times and begs for a reconciliation, but is ousted. He decides to live with Sathya and Rocky, and they decide to sell the liquor that Sathya's father Soosaiyappan made, naming the brand Sooraa.

1998: Gandhi, Sathya, and Rocky become rich from selling the liquor and plan to start and lead a syndicate where only their drinks can be sold in Tamil Nadu bars. One member opposes their leadership, resulting in him being tied up and sent away in a cow truck. Later on, the trio visit a bar and try some strong alcohol, which severely intoxicates them. They are then driven to the rival member, who tries to kill Rocky in front of Sathya, but Gandhi drunkenly stops him and fights all of them off. This incident causes Sathya to become a devout Christian and paranoid, and he suggests that they stop selling liquor, while Gandhi convinces him otherwise.

2003: Gandhi, Sathya and Rocky have become influential people in society. However, the Tamil Nadu Government announces that only government-approved liquor can be sold in bars. With this development, they decide to visit one of the party members, Gnanodhyam, through his supporter Anthony, whom they then deduce is the same Gnanam, one of their childhood friends, through his scar. He agrees to a deal that Sooraa can be sold in bars.

2008: Gandhi has become a billionaire owning several distilleries, and the gang runs a liquor mafia in Tamil Nadu. The CBI is trying to find evidence to arrest them. At Rocky's wedding, Gnanam proposes a deal to Gandhi: he can let them produce the entire stock of liquor in Tamil Nadu if they kill off the DC. The group does so. Gnanam then meets Sathya and Gandhi and proposes that they sell their liquor under different brands of lower quality, which Sathya does not agree with due to business ethics. Gandhi admits that they killed off the collector, but Sathya storms off and Gandhi admits he sees Gnanam as less of a friend than Sathya. With all of this, Gnanam decides to cancel Sooraa's license, but they know Gnanam illicitly had a son (Anthony) with a woman in his old colony and use this information to blackmail Gnanam into reinstating Sooraa's license.

2016: Gandhi leaves for a festival where one of his gang members, Michael, invites him. In the middle of the festival, a stranger arrives and reveals himself to Gandhi as his son Dada. In this timeframe, Dada kills Michael and tells Gandhi he was appointed on a special mission to eliminate the liquor mafia.

1996–2016: Dada moves to North India with his mother and relatives, where they receive news of Gandhi's success in the liquor business against Mohandoss's wishes, angering them all. His relatives convince Nachi to remarry, but she withdraws at the last minute, still faithful to Gandhi. Rajavel blamed Gandhi for his death on his deathbed, which motivated Dada to retaliate against Gandhi. He assaulted someone for trying to make him drink and was encouraged to join the IPS for his revenge. He is soon appointed to the Special Task Force to dismantle the liquor mafia.

Dada assures Gandhi that he will not kill him, but he will kill everyone else. It is revealed that Gnanam, who became Deputy CM, wanted to appoint the team to retaliate against the entire group. Gandhi visits Gnanam and tells him to stop the operation before it worsens. Meanwhile, Dada kills Anthony. Enraged, Rocky tries to learn who killed Anthony and Michael, and Gandhi is forced to reveal to Rocky that the officer who killed them both was his son, and he can do nothing about it.

Rocky tries to convince Dada not to kill them, presenting himself as an older brother, but Dada kills him and incapacitates Gandhi. Gandhi gets up and fights Dada, but cannot kill him as his father. Gandhi attempts to convince Sathya to target Gnanam instead of Dada, but his efforts fail as their relationship remains undisclosed. He visits Nachi and reconciles with her, but they cannot convince Dada. She moves into Gandhi's house and lives there, where he asks her to leave with Dada. She talks to the Deputy CM, Gnanam, to dismiss Dada, where Gnanam recognizes her in the picture at Gandhi's house. Dada is kidnapped by Gnanam, who learns that Dada is Gandhi's son and will only release him if Gandhi kills Sathya. Sathya gets a video showing Rocky's death and notices Gandhi in it, where Gandhi admits Dada is his son and reveals the incident.

Sathya tries to kill Gandhi, but Gandhi kills Sathya when he admits he would target Dada next, before killing all his henchmen. Gandhi leaves for a remote location and burns the car he and Sathya bought together, while Dada arrives. He reveals that he was never kidnapped by Gnanam and wanted Gandhi to kill Sathya, and Dada accelerated the process by sending the video footage to him. Gandhi states he should have killed both Dada and Nachi in 1996, before insulting her, and Dada then threatens to kill him if he continues to insult her. Gandhi then questions her whereabouts, stating that Gnanam said he had his whole family with him, leading Dada to believe she was truly abducted.

Gandhi plans to kill Gnanam, and he convinces Dada to do the deed as his son, but it is revealed that Nachi was not kidnapped but given a bhang ball by Manickam to put her into a deep sleep. Dada visits Gnanam and kills him while on the phone with Gandhi. Gandhi reveals that he destroyed all the liquor in his house, signed all of his wealth to an NGO, and shuttered the factories. He also tells Dada that he used this opportunity to have Dada arrested and teach him the importance of balance in life, saying that Gandhi himself believed that having a lack of freedom to make mistakes means that a person has no real freedom. Gandhi proclaims that he has finally become a "Mahaan". Both men drink a glass of Sooraa and throw them away in frustration.

== Cast ==
- Vikram as Gandhi Mahaan
  - Raghavan as Young Gandhi Mahaan
- Dhruv Vikram as Dadabhai Naoroji "Dada", Gandhi's son
  - Akshath Das as Young Dadabhai Naoroji
- Simran as Naachiyaar "Naachi" Gandhi, Gandhi's estranged wife and Dada's mother (voice-over by Savitha Reddy)
- Bobby Simha as Sathyavan "Sathya" Soosaiyappan, Gandhi's childhood best friend
- Sananth as Rakesh "Rocky" Christopher Soosaiyappan, Sathyavan's son
- Vettai Muthukumar as Gnanodayam "Gnanam", Gandhi's childhood friend later enemy
  - Sembaruthi Sanjay as Young Gnanam
- Ramachandran Durairaj as Manickam, Gandhi's friend
- Gajaraj as Rajavel, Naachiyaar's father
- Subatra Robert as Thilagu Soosaiyappan, Sathyavan's wife
- Deepak Paramesh as Anthony
- Murugavel as Michael
- Benito Franklin as Bose
- Vani Bhojan as Mangai, Gandhi's ex-lover (deleted scenes)
- Aadukalam Naren as Mohandoss, Gandhi's father (cameo appearance)
- Balaji Sakthivel as Soosaiyappan, Sathyavan's father (cameo appearance)

== Production ==
=== Development ===
In June 2020, Karthik Subbaraj was reported to direct a gangster film with Vikram in the lead role, which was tentatively titled Chiyaan 60. Vikram, initially greenlit the one-liner narrated by Subbaraj in 2016, while he was shooting for Iru Mugan, but he could not offer the role due to his commitments in other projects. While Karthik Subbaraj worked on Jagame Thandhiram, Vikram agreed to start the shoot with Subbaraj's script he earlier planned, with S. S. Lalit Kumar of Seven Screen Studio, which produced the actor's Cobra, agreed to fund the project. The film marked Vikram's return to gangster film-genre after Gemini (2002) and Bheemaa (2008). Lalit Kumar officially announced the project on 8 June 2020, with Vikram's son Dhruv also sharing a pivotal role in the film. Karthik Subbaraj used the COVID-19 lockdown period to develop the film's script and had planned to start the shoot only after the lockdown ends. It was touted to be a film based on revenge, similar to the director's Petta. On 20 August 2021, the film's official title was unveiled as Mahaan.

=== Casting ===
Soon after the film's announcement Anirudh Ravichander was chosen to score the music, in his second collaboration with Karthik Subbaraj after Petta (2019) and his maiden collaboration with Vikram. Shreyaas Krishna who worked with Subbaraj in Jagame Thandhiram was signed as the cinematographer and Vivek Harshan joined the film's team as the editor, after multiple associations with Subbaraj since Jigarthanda (2014). Anirudh opted out of the project due to his busy schedule and was replaced by Subbaraj's norm composer Santhosh Narayanan.

The makers announced the principal cast and crew members on 10 March 2021 onwards, with Simran being the first member to be announced as a part of the film. On 12 March, Bobby Simha was announced as being in the cast, this being his sixth collaboration with Subbaraj. The next day, Vani Bhojan was confirmed, with her role reported to be Vikram's love interest; however her scenes did not make the final cut. Actors Sanath and Vettai Muthukumar were announced soon after. Sound designer Kunal Rajan who worked in Enthiran and Vishwaroopam was announced a part of the technical team, while Dinesh Subbarayan, son of prominent stunt choreographer Super Subbarayan joined the team as stunt director.

=== Filming ===
Subbaraj fixed Kodaikanal as the principal location for the film, and planned to start the shoot in February 2021 due to Vikram's commitments to Cobra and Ponniyin Selvan. With Vikram's return to Chennai after completing the shooting schedule for Cobra in Russia, principal photography commenced on 10 March 2021. The film was set to be shot across Chennai, Goa and Kodaikanal. On 29 April 2021, despite the continuous shoot for about 50 days, the producers suspended the shooting, keeping in mind the rise in COVID-19 infections across Tamil Nadu. By then, 50% of the film's shooting was complete. In late-June 2021, it was announced that Subbaraj planned to resume shooting for the film in July, with the entire team being vaccinated before the shoot.

Filming resumed on 6 July, with a 35-day schedule being held in Kanchipuram and then another shooting schedule was planned around Chennai, Goa and Darjeeling. In mid-July 2021, the team headed to Darjeeling for the final schedule. and portions involving Vikram, Dhruv and Vani Bhojan were shot in this schedule. On 9 August, it was reported that Dhruv Vikram had wrapped shooting for his portions in the film. Four days later, on 14 August, it was reported that shooting for the film has been wrapped. In December 2021, Vikram and Dhruv had completed dubbing for their respective parts.

== Music ==
Mahaan

Soundtrack album by Santhosh Narayanan
- Released: 9 February 2022
- Genre: Feature film soundtrack
- Length: 24:48
- Language: Tamil
- Label: Sony Music India
- Producer: Santhosh Narayanan

Santhosh Narayanan chronology
Kasada Tabara (2021)	Mahaan (2022)	Kadaisi Vivasayi (2022)

The film's soundtrack and score is composed by Santhosh Narayanan. Compositions for the soundtrack began during March 2021, where Santhosh and his music team recorded the first track, in collaboration with native folk musicians from Tamil Nadu. In April 2021, he started tracking vocals to record the film's songs. During mid-December, Dhruv had recorded vocals for one of the songs in the film, incorrectly reported to be his singing debut, as he had already sung in his debut film Adithya Varma (2019).

On the occasion of Ganesh Chaturthi (10 September 2021), the first single track "Soorayaatam" was unveiled by Sony Music India. The second single "Evanda Enakku Custody", a retro-based dance number, was released on 28 January 2022. The third single "Pona Povura", was released on 2 February 2022. The fourth single "Rich Rich", was released on 5 February 2022. The fifth single "Missing Me", written and sung by Dhruv, was released on 8 February 2022. The sixth single "Naan Naan", a tribute to Vikram, was released on 9 February 2022.

Track listing
No.	Title	Lyrics	Singer(s)	Length
1.	"Soorayaatam"	Muthamil	V. M. Mahalingam, Santhosh Narayanan	4:41
2.	"Pona Povura"	Asal Kolaar	Gaana Muthu, Asal Kolaar	3:23
3.	"Rich Rich"	Durai	OfRo, Durai	3:05
4.	"Evanda Enakku Custody"	Vivek	Santhosh Narayanan	3:32
5.	"Missing Me"	Vivek, Dhruv Vikram	Dhruv Vikram	3:01
6.	"Naan Naan"	Vivek	Santhosh Narayanan	4:08
7.	"Umm Song"	Vivek	Aditya Ravindran	2:55
Total length:				24:48

== Release ==
Mahaan had a direct-to-streaming release on 10 February 2022 via Amazon Prime Video, and had its television premiere via Kalaignar TV on 31 August 2022.

== Critical reception ==
M Suganth of The Times of India gave 3.5/5 stars stating that "Thankfully, the emotional stakes keep getting higher and the actors deliver splendid performances. There is an air of casualness in Vikram, who seems to have loosened up a lot, that only shows the actor enjoying himself with a performance that is his best since Raavanan, which was way back, in 2010. Dhruv matches up to him in many of the scenes, proving that he is a chip off the old block. Simha, Muthukumar, Simran and Sananth, too, deliver memorable performances that elevate the scenes and the film. Praveen Sudevan of The Hindu wrote "Karthik Subbaraj attempts a meditation on morality and ideology within a crime saga that struggles to bear its own weight."

Ashameera Aiyappan of Firstpost gave 2/5 stars and wrote "Karthik Subbaraj's films have always played with irony. In Jigarthanda, he found irony in a gangster who found his calling as a comedian. Pizza had a man who was terrified of ghosts, cook up a great ghost story to cover up a theft. Iraivi was a film about female empowerment but told through the male characters. Even his short film in the anthology Navarasa looks at 'peace' from an ironic vantage point, an ongoing war. Mahaan is the latest addition to the list. But with its flawed set-ups and a lack of emotional depth, it doesn't become a very memorable one." Haricharan Pudipeddi of Hindustan Times wrote "Mahaan extracts a very uninhibited performance from Vikram, who is refreshing in a character that spans over five decades. This is a very mature performance, and he embraces the character's flaws and vulnerability so convincingly. Dhruv Vikram looks even more comfortable in his second outing as an actor. After leaving a strong impact with his debut film, a remake of Arjun Reddy, he delivers a slightly exaggerated performance which suits the character. Bobby Simhaa gets a meaty part and even though you find him in almost every Karthik Subbaraj film, he manages to surprise each time."

Manoj Kumar R of The Indian Express gave 3.5/5 stars stating that "Composer Santhosh Narayanan's background score, cinematographer Shreyaas Krishna's camera enriches the mood and atmosphere of Karthik's vision. If Karthik had slowed the pace a little and dug deep into the period and atmosphere of his characters, Mahaan could have been his own version of Once Upon a Time in America. But, that doesn't take away the fact that it is a spicy action-family-drama that in a way captures the moral and spiritual struggle of our time." Ranjani Krishnakumar of Film Companion wrote "At two hours and forty-two minutes, Mahaan is a self-indulgent and vacuous film. At its best, it's tiresome. At its worst, it's an abomination."

Aditya Shrikrishna of The Quint wrote "Vikram's Gandhi transforms into 'The Man with No Name' in his sleep, belting out "get three coffins ready" like Clint Eastwood in A Fistful of Dollars. But after a chance meeting with a beggar on his fortieth birthday and a harsh dressing down, and a day for himself without family, he takes matters into his own hands. A curious choice from Karthik on the beggar as a major plot shifter, almost like the witches in Macbeth or the ghost in Hamlet. Mahaan doesn't shy away from its larger Shakespearean themes." Vivek M V of Deccan Herald gave 3/5 stars and wrote "Mahaan begins with a quote from Gandhi that says, 'Freedom is not worth having if it doesn't include the freedom to make mistakes'. Karthik's mistakes while attempting unique stories can perhaps be forgiven. But the truth remains that since Petta, the director's craft has seen a decline."

Janani K of India Today gave 3/5 stars and wrote "Mahaan could have been a solid gangster drama with a conflict between a dad and son at the core. If only Karthik Subbaraj had conveyed his thoughts in a crisp screenplay, Mahaan could have been much better." Saibal Chatterjee of NDTV gave 2.5/5 stars and wrote "Mahaan grabs that freedom with both hands – like the eponymous character, it makes its share of mistakes and lives to tell the tale because Vikram injects just enough variety into it with a performance that serves to temper some of the film's excesses." Sowmya Rajendran of The News Minute stated that "Instead of the gangster saga that it is, I wish it had been a satirical comedy on Gandhism, and a man caught in the middle of an uptight family, and his adventures without their knowledge. If only Karthik would break his rigid rule about dragging gangsters into every idea he has!"

== Censorship ==
In an interview after the film's release, Karthik Subbaraj stated that some dialogues criticising Mahatma Gandhi's killer Nathuram Godse were censored. He stated that the line "Gandhi was killed by someone with maniacal ideological devotion, such as Godse" was asked to be removed and was told that he was free to include anything about Gandhi but not about Godse.

== Potential sequel ==
In a recent interview on February 14, 2026, Karthik Subbaraj stated that he has some ideas for a sequel, but no script yet, and filming will not begin until at least 2027 or 2028.
