= Jigarthanda DoubleX =

2023 Indian film by Karthik Subbaraj

- Theatrical release poster
- Directed by: Karthik Subbaraj
- Written by: Karthik Subbaraj
- Produced by: Karthik Subbaraj; Kaarthekeyen Santhanam; S. Kathiresan; Alankar Pandian
- Starring: Raghava Lawrence; S. J. Suryah
- Cinematography: Tirru
- Edited by: Shafique Mohamed Ali
- Music by: Santhosh Narayanan
- Production companies: Stone Bench Films; Five Star Creations LLP; Invenio Origin
- Distributed by: Red Giant Movies
- Release date: 10 November 2023
- Running time: 170 minutes
- Country: India
- Language: Tamil
- Box office: ₹65 crore

Jigarthanda DoubleX is a 2023 Indian Tamil-language period action drama film written and directed by Karthik Subbaraj and jointly produced by him, Kaarthekeyen Santhanam, S. Kathiresan and Alankar Pandian under Stone Bench Films, Five Star Creations and Invenio Origin. The film, a prequel to Jigarthanda (2014), stars Raghava Lawrence, S. J. Suryah, Nimisha Sajayan, Ilavarasu, Sathyan, Naveen Chandra, Shine Tom Chacko and Aravind Akash. Set in the 1970s, it revolves around an upcoming policeman trying to kill a gangster by going undercover as a filmmaker.

The film was officially announced in August 2022, with the tentative title Jigarthanda 2, and the official title was announced in December. Principal photography began the same month in Madurai followed with a schedule in Thandikudi and wrapped by early-July 2023. The film has music composed by Santhosh Narayanan, cinematography handled by Tirru and editing by Shafique Mohamed Ali.

Jigarthanda DoubleX was released on 10 November 2023, the week of Diwali, and received critical acclaim. It grossed over ₹65 crore (equivalent to ₹71 crore or US$7.6 million in 2026) worldwide.

== Plot ==
In 1973, DSP Rathna Kumar is assigned to nab the elephant poacher Shettani in Kombai Kaanai forest of Tamil Nadu. The police torture the local tribals about Shettani's whereabouts, even though they themselves are his victims.

In Madras, Kirubakaran "Kiruban" is chosen as a SI in the Tamil Nadu Police. He visits his fiancée Lourde's college to share the news and witness her performance at an event. Later, Lourde persuades Kiruban to intervene in a brawl among students nearby. After some time, it appears that Kiruban has killed four of the students, despite his apparent aversion to blood as he faints upon seeing it. Since he is found holding the murder weapon, he is subsequently sentenced to prison.

In 1975, the incumbent Chief Minister of Tamil Nadu (CM) Sindhanai Rani has recently announced her move to national politics in a few months, necessitating election of a new CM. Rathna's elder brother Jeyakodi is a famous film star and rising politician in the ruling SMDK party who desires to be the next CM. Jeyakodi is distressed about his film screenings being halted in Coimbatore, Madurai, Ramnad and Tirunelveli by supporters of his rival, Minister of Finance Karmegam. Karmegam, the frontrunner to become the next CM, is supported by four criminal gangs across Tamil Nadu, and promotes a younger actor Chinna to replace Jeyakodi. Jeyakodi requests Rathna to kill four gangsters who support Karmegam, to make Karmegam less influential within the party. Selecting Kiruban and three other ex-cop prisoners, Rathna offers them a full pardon and immediate recruitment into the police force, in exchange for them performing covert murders. He assigns each of them a single target, with Kiruban's target being Alliyus Caesar, Karmegam's principal supporter in Madurai. Wanting to marry Lourde and reclaim his job, Kiruban accepts.

On a suggestion from Chinna, Caesar decides to conduct an audition for a director who can make a pan-Indian film with him as the lead and introduce him as the first dark-complexioned actor in Tamil cinema. Kiruban assumes the alias of "Ray Dasan", a student and assistant director of Satyajit Ray and gets through the audition. Kiruban offers to make a film based on Caesar's life titled Pandyaa. Being an ardent fan of Clint Eastwood, Caesar agrees to Ray's plan. For the film shooting, Kiruban films Caesar's real life antics using a camera that Eastwood supposedly gifted to Caesar when he came for a shoot near their village. Kiruban learns that Caesar belongs to the same tribe that is being targeted by Shettani.

Caesar invites the other three gangsters and Karmegam for his wife Malaiyarasi's baby shower and start of the film shoot. One of the targets in the police's hitlist is killed by one of the moles. Caesar eventually finds and kills all the moles except Kiruban. Kiruban learns that Caesar was the one who led the hit on the four students in 1973, for which Kiruban became the scapegoat. Wanting revenge, Kiruban convinces Caesar to visit his Kombai Kaanai village and nab Shettani under the pretext that this addition will make a better biopic. In the village, Caesar promises to nab Shettani in exchange for Rathna releasing the tribals. The villagers reveal the importance of elephants in their culture and how they are vanishing from the forests due to poachers. Caesar and the tribals subvert Shettani gang's raid and kill most of them.

Surviving members are captured and reveal Shettani's whereabouts. Caesar confronts Shettani, who is hunting elephants, and almost gets killed. Kiruban has a change of heart and saves Caesar by taking his body to the village for treatment. Upon recuperation, Caesar fights Shettani again and captures him. The tribe demands the presence of Sindhanai Rani, who promptly comes for media publicity. Caeser hands Shettani over to the police in the presence of Sindhanai Rani, who visits upon his insistence that Shettani will be delivered. The villagers celebrate once the inmates are released and Kiruban marries local tribeswoman Paingili.

The next day, Caesar and Kiruban are shocked to see Shettani still hunting elephants. Shettani reveals that it is the CM-led government that has nurtured him over the years so that he can smuggle ivories on behalf of two business tycoons. They promised Sindhanai Rani to eventually elevate her to the post of Prime Minister through lobbying. Shettani also reveals that the authorities have planned to label Caesar as the real Shettani and eventually wipe out the tribe in a police operation. Shettani is then attacked by an elephant whilst the tribals agree to lay their lives peacefully and confront the police firing. Rathna Kumar personally kills Caesar while his police subordinates kill the villagers, including Malaiyarasi. Kiruban, who films the massacre, tries to escape with Paingili and Caesar's newborn child, but they get shot by Rathna. None of these incidents reach the general public.

Within weeks, Jeyakodi is touted to be the next CM candidate, and Karmegam is dropped from the cabinet. Karmegam, who had managed to secure tapes of Kiruban's footage, plays it in a packed theatre where Jeyakodi's film was supposed to play, as a tribute to Caesar. The audience learns about Caesar's life and the government-led massacre of the tribals and start protesting against the government. News of the massacre reaches the higher-ups in the central government. Sindhanai Rani sends Rathna and his men to kill Karmegam in the theatre, but Rathna is shocked to see Kiruban, who is still alive. Kiruban personally kills Rathna, while Karmegam's aides eliminate his men.

Kiruban returns home to be with Caesar's son, where Paingili and Kiruban name him Sethu, as per Malaiyarasi's vow to Goddess Sethukaali Amman. An anonymous man secretly follows Paingili and Sethu, and tells another man that they will eliminate the last remaining members of Caesar's family.

== Cast ==
- Raghava Lawrence as Alliyus "Alliyan" Caesar
  - Ganesh as young Alliyan (uncredited)
- S. J. Suryah as Kirubakaran "Kiruban" / Ray Dasan
- Nimisha Sajayan as Malaiarasi
- Ilavarasu as Minister Karmegam
- Naveen Chandra as DSP Rathna Kumar IPS
- Sathyan as Durai Pandi
- Sanchana Natarajan as Paingili
- Shine Tom Chacko as Jeyakodi
- Aravind Akash as Chinna
- Ashraf Mallissery as Kariyan
- Vidhu as Shettani
- Kapila Venu as Sindhanai Rani
- Tamizh as Jothi
- Theni Murugan as Sangaiyan
- Bava Chelladurai as SB Chandar (cameo appearance)
- Sheela Rajkumar as Lourde (cameo appearance)
- Vishnu Govindan as Murugan
- Aadhitya Baaskar as Govindhan
- Sujatha Babu as Lakshmi

Additionally, Sananth appears in an uncredited role.

== Production ==
=== Development ===
In early April 2022, it was reported that director Karthik Subbaraj was to begin working on a sequel to his 2014 film Jigarthanda. On 1 August 8 years since the release of Jigarthanda, the project was officially announced. Santhosh Narayanan was chosen as the music composer, who also scored in Jigarthanda and has been part of Karthik's earlier films. Karthik, on Vinayagar Chathurthi on 31 August, shared that the pre-production of Jigarthanda 2 has begun. He further claimed that the film would not have any connection to its predecessor and would have a fresh narrative. The cinematography was handled by Tirru, who earlier worked on Karthik's Mercury (2018) and Petta (2019). Shafique Mohamed Ali joined as the editor. On 11 December, the title Jigarthanda DoubleX was announced, along with a promotional video. The film was produced by Five Star Creations, Invenio Origin, and Stone Bench Creations.

=== Casting and filming ===
S. J. Suryah's character, including his hairstyle and sartorial choices, were inspired by filmmaker Satyajit Ray. Suryah was initially reluctant to act in the film as he had already portrayed a filmmaker in Karthik's Iraivi (2016) but accepted after Karthik said he wanted a "good performer" for the role. Karthik cast Raghava Lawrence after being impressed with his performance in Parthen Rasithen (2001). Nimisha Sajayan auditioned for a role in the film and was successfully cast. Principal photography began in Madurai on 12 December 2022. Filming took place in exotic locations across Kerala and Tamil Nadu. Many extensive sets were created to match the film's setting. A set was erected in Thandikudi near Kodaikanal where major portions of the film were shot. While filming his fight sequences, actor Vidhu, who portrayed one of the antagonists Shettani, was told to fight like an animal, so he practised gymnastics and Silambam for the same. The actor Clint Eastwood appears in the film digitally recreated. Filming wrapped in July 2023.

== Soundtrack ==
The soundtrack and background score were composed by Santhosh Narayanan. A single "Maamadura" was released on 8 October 2023. It gained renewed attention after featuring in the 2026 American film Best of the Best.

Track listing
No.	Title	Lyrics	Singer(s)	Length
1.	"Maamadura"	Vivek	Dhee, Santhosh Narayanan	3:03
2.	"10000 Pax"	OfRo	OfRo	3:02
3.	"Theekuchi"	Muthamil, Poovan Matheesan	Yuvan Shankar Raja, Santhosh Narayanan	2:57
4.	"Oyyaram"	Vivek	Meenakshi Elayaraja, Meenakshi Santhosh, Aditya Ravindran, Santhosh Narayanan	3:45
Total length:				10:30

== Release ==
=== Theatrical and festivals ===
The film was released theatrically on 10 November 2023. It was showcased at the 53rd International Film Festival Rotterdam on 26 January 2024 in Limelight.

=== Distribution ===
Red Giant Movies holds the film's domestic distribution rights, while Ahimsa Entertainment holds the overseas distribution rights.

=== Home media ===
The film began streaming on Netflix from 8 December 2023. While promoting Retro (2025), Karthik revealed that he wanted to make an extended cut of Jigarthanda DoubleX in the form of a limited series, inspired by Quentin Tarantino's 2015 film The Hateful Eight also having a series version, and pitched this idea to Netflix but was unsuccessful.

== Critical reception ==
Jigarthanda DoubleX received positive reviews.

Krishna Selvaseelan of the Tamil Guardian gave 4.5/5 stars and said, "Subbaraj may have delivered his best film yet. The film betters its first instalment in every department." Manoj Kumar of OTTPlay gave 3.5/5 stars and wrote, "Karthik Subbaraj offers an engaging cinematic experience with moving visuals and strong performances while highlighting the cinema's responsibility towards society to make sense of life." Kirubhakar Purushothaman of The Indian Express gave 3.5/5 stars and wrote, "Karthik Subbaraj's film tries to be a lot of things at once. It's Jack of all and King of one -- deliciously entertaining meta cinema."

Janani. K of India Today gave 3.5/5 stars and wrote, "Jigarthanda Double X is one of Karthik Subbaraj's best works to date. And it's truly happy to see the filmmaker back in form." Logesh Balachandran of The Times of India gave 3/5 stars and wrote, "Karthik Subbaraj yet again tries to explore the influential power of cinema, but despite strong intentions and adrenaline-pumping moments, the narrative loses its cohesion after the intermission. In conclusion, Jigarthanda DoubleX earnestly tries to replicate Jigarthanda but falls slightly short of achieving that feat." Priyanka Sundar of Firstpost gave 3/5 stars and wrote, "Jigarthanda DoubleX is a little bit of a Western film, but instead of a cowboy, we have local gangsters swinging their weapon of choice, be it a camera or a gun." Bhuvanesh Chander of The Hindu wrote, "Jigarthanda Double X is the most heartfelt film Karthik Subbaraj has done. Starring Raghava Lawrence and SJ Suryah, Karthik Subbaraj's 'Pandyaa Western' film brings together the soul of 2014's Jigarthanda and the spirit of a spaghetti Western, becoming his most political and heartfelt film to date. And is truly a Double X of Jigarthanda."

Lakshmi Subramaniam of The Week gave 2/5 stars and wrote, "The second installment too evolves around filmmaking with a gangster at the centre. If you had watched the first chapter of Jigarthanda and expected something big from Subbaraj, you are likely to be disappointed." Bharathy Singaravel of The News Minute wrote, "Jigarthanda DoubleX is a tormented declaration of Karthik's political views, nearly three hours long, with some elements of his earlier brand of filmmaking still in tow. If Karthik Subbaraj believes that cinema is a means to political change, he needs to put more thought into it, than superficial gestures that might garner a few claps." Clint Eastwood expressed his desire to watch the film after completing his ongoing commitments.

== Future ==
In April 2026, Karthik revealed his plans for a third Jigarthanda film.
