= Jagame Thandhiram =

2021 film by Karthik Subbaraj

- Official release poster
- Directed by: Karthik Subbaraj
- Written by: Karthik Subbaraj
- Produced by: S. Sashikanth; Chakravarthy Ramachandra
- Starring: Dhanush; James Cosmo; Joju George; Aishwarya Lekshmi; Kalaiyarasan
- Cinematography: Shreyaas Krishna
- Edited by: Vivek Harshan
- Music by: Santhosh Narayanan
- Production companies: YNOT Studios; Reliance Entertainment
- Distributed by: Netflix
- Release date: 18 June 2021
- Running time: 158 minutes
- Country: India
- Language: Tamil
- Budget: ₹55 crore

Jagame Thandhiram (transl. The Universe is a Ruse) is a 2021 Indian Tamil-language crime action film directed by Karthik Subbaraj and produced by YNOT Studios together with Reliance Entertainment. The film stars Dhanush, James Cosmo, Joju George, Aishwarya Lekshmi and Kalaiyarasan. It follows Suruli, a gangster from Madurai, who is recruited to help Peter Sprott, a British crime lord, to take down a rival, but later gets caught off guard by the moral dilemmas that follow.

The project was initially announced in April 2016 with Thenandal Studio Limited attached to the project, but got shelved due to the financial problems surrounding the production house. It was revived in February 2018, with YNOT Studios acquiring the production rights. After an official launch in July 2019, the film began production in September 2019, with shooting taking place across London, Madurai, Rameshwaram, Tiruchendur and Jaipur and concluded by December 2019. The songs and background score were composed by Santhosh Narayanan, with cinematography handled by Shreyas Krishna and editing done by Vivek Harshan.

Jagame Thandhiram was scheduled for a theatrical release on 1 May 2020, but was delayed indefinitely due to the COVID-19 pandemic. While the makers initially planned on releasing the film only in theatres, this decision was dropped in February 2021 in favour of a worldwide direct-to-streaming release through Netflix on 18 June 2021. It was dubbed and released in 17 languages, across 190 countries. The film received mixed reviews from critics.

== Plot ==
Suruli is a gangster who runs a parotta restaurant in Madurai. Due to his thug-like behaviour, he is unable to find a bride for long. Finally when his mother finds a bride, and his engagement is fixed, he kills the brother of a rival jeweller inside a train on the noon of the engagement. The bride runs away when she finds out about his criminal background, and he is forced to go into hiding to avoid the police. His notoriety comes to the attention of an Englishman named John, who is a right-hand man of a London-based white supremacist don named Peter Sprott. John offers £200,000 per week to Suruli if he works for Sprott, against a successful rival don Sivadoss, who is Peter's arch-nemesis and has considerable influence among London's Tamil-speaking population. Sprott's gang does not understand the meticulous organisation and unorthodox working of Sivadoss' gang and want Suruli's help to finish them off.

Suruli accepts the offer with the intention to use the money to eventually settle down and give up his criminal activities, and leaves for London where he learns more about Sivadoss and his gang as well as their activities which involve smuggling weapons from conflict-ridden countries in exchange for money. Led by Suruli and John, Sprott's gang raid Sivadoss's boat yard where the smuggling is in process under Sivadoss's right-hand man Rajan. During the raid, Suruli kills Rajan as well. Sivadoss and his gang realise that Suruli is responsible for killing Rajan and kidnaps him. Suruli is beaten severely.

Suruli and Sivadoss negotiate to kill Sprott under the ruse of inviting him for a "peace talk" to end their feud, in exchange for £600,000 as well as a paratha restaurant in London. During the "peace talk", Suruli betrays Sivadoss and hands over an aruval to Sprott, who uses it to hack Sivadoss to death. Most of Sivadoss' gang members are ambushed and killed at the same time. As a reward for Sivadoss's death, Sprott offers Suruli a small designated area in London to start his business and allow Tamils to live there and christens the area "Little Madurai".

Meanwhile, Suruli falls in love with Attila, a Sri Lankan Tamil singer. When he initially approaches Attila, she reveals that she is a widow with a seven-year-old son named Dheeran. However, Attila soon reciprocates Suruli's feelings. While on a date at a park, they are attacked by Sivadoss's remaining henchmen Deepan and Dharani, who have sworn to take revenge on Suruli for betrayal and helping Sprott to kill Sivadoss. Deepan shoots Suruli, leaving him critically wounded. However, Suruli soon manages to recover under Attila's care. One day, Suruli captures her after she injects a mysterious drug into his drip bag with the intention to kill him. When confronted, Attila reveals why she wants to kill him.

In the past, Attila, Dheeran and Attila's brother are the only survivors of an aerial attack on their village in Sri Lanka during the Sri Lankan civil war. It is also revealed that Dheeran is not Attila's son, but her brother's son. At a refugee camp, they are convinced by Sivadoss's aide to join Sivadoss's gang, who would help them move to London under the guise of husband, wife and child and are offered fake passports. On the way, Attila's brother is caught and thrown into Sprott's private prison, which paid for by the government is used to hold refugees and illegal immigrants, but Attila and Dheeran safely make it to London.

Attila further reveals that Sivadoss was involved in smuggling, with the intention to use the money to help the illegal immigrants and refugees from all countries financially and legally and was planning to fight for her brother's release as well. On hearing about Suruli's love for Attila, Sivadoss decided to offer him protection and get him married to Attila. But due to Sivadoss's death, the money to fight for the immigrants' rights had dried up. The hawala brokers around the world are refusing to pay Sivadoss' due money and Attila's brother has no chance of being released from prison. Hence, Attila had planned the encounter in the park between Suruli, Deepan and Dharani with the intention to kill Suruli, but she still saved him due to her love for him.

In the present, Suruli learns about a bill pending in the British parliament called BICORE, whose purpose is for restricting immigration and is being pushed by Sprott and a few other lawmakers. If passed, most of the refugees and illegal immigrants would be deported or thrown into prisons, which would benefit Sprott. On hearing this, Suruli has a change of heart and decides to help Attila, Deepan and Dharani in their fight against Sprott and BICORE.

With the help of Deepan and Dharani, Suruli manages to recover the money which Sivadoss had acquired for the immigrants, and this money is used to release some of the immigrants, including Attila's brother. Suruli and Attila resume their relationship. Later, Sprott asks Suruli to travel to Birmingham to kill Andrews, a minister who is against BICORE. Suruli realises that Sprott wants him to kill Andrews so that his death can be blamed on an immigrant, and thus BICORE would gain more support and be passed in Parliament. Suruli refuses to kill Andrews. In retribution, Sprott, John and their men attack Little Madurai and kill Suruli's close friend Murugesan in the process.

Without other option, Suruli's accepts Sprott's demands and leaves for Birmingham. However, during the journey, Suruli, Deepan and Dharani kill John and head for Sprott's mansion instead. They manage to shoot down Sprott's goons and barge into Sprott's room. Despite Deepan and Dharani wanting to kill Sprott, Suruli decides against it and instead transports Sprott to a remote land on the Afghanistan–Iran border. Suruli, Deepan and Dharani then destroy all proof of Sprott's British citizenship, offer him a fake passport from the "Republic of Mattuthavani" and leave him there to live as a stateless refugee forever.

== Cast ==
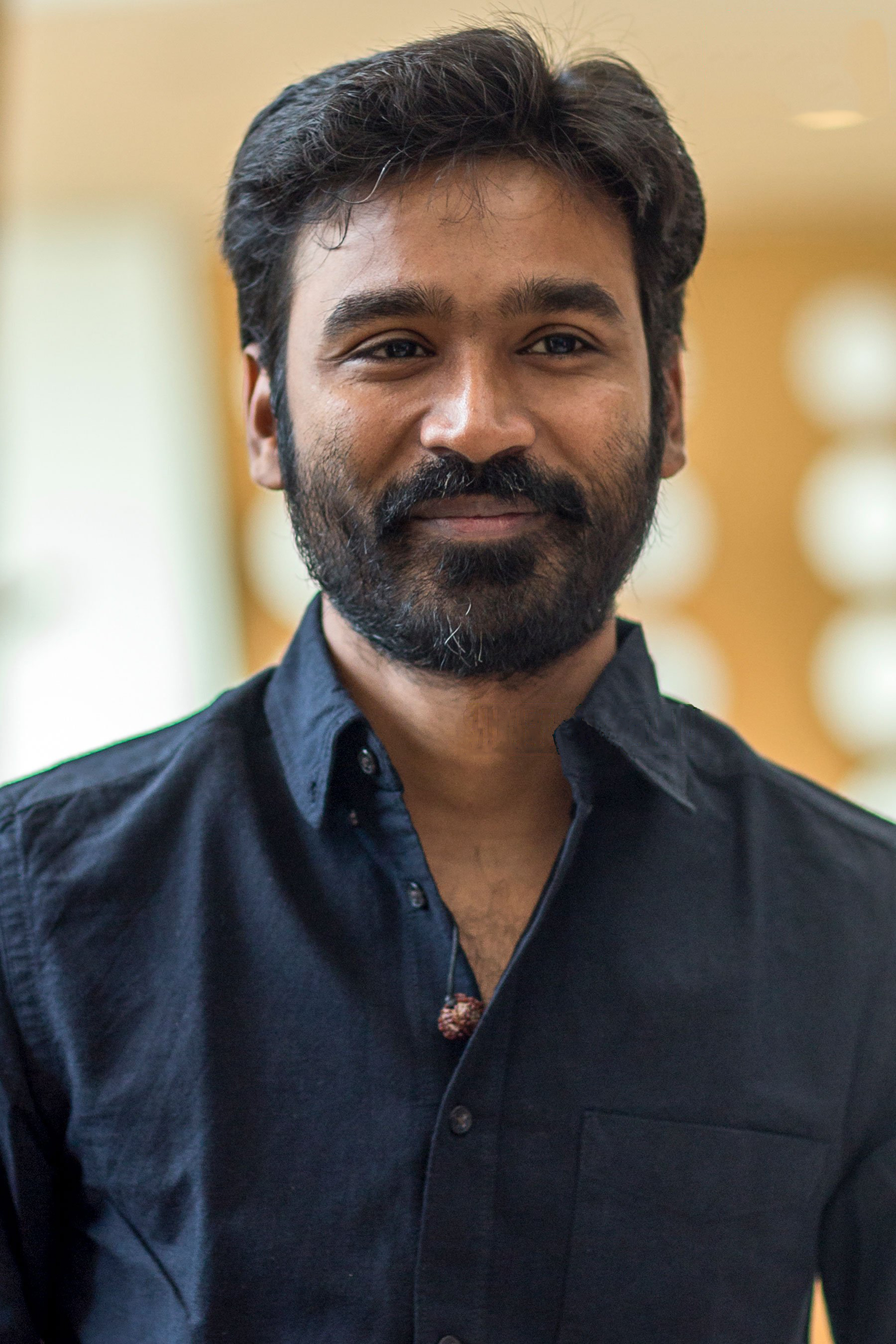
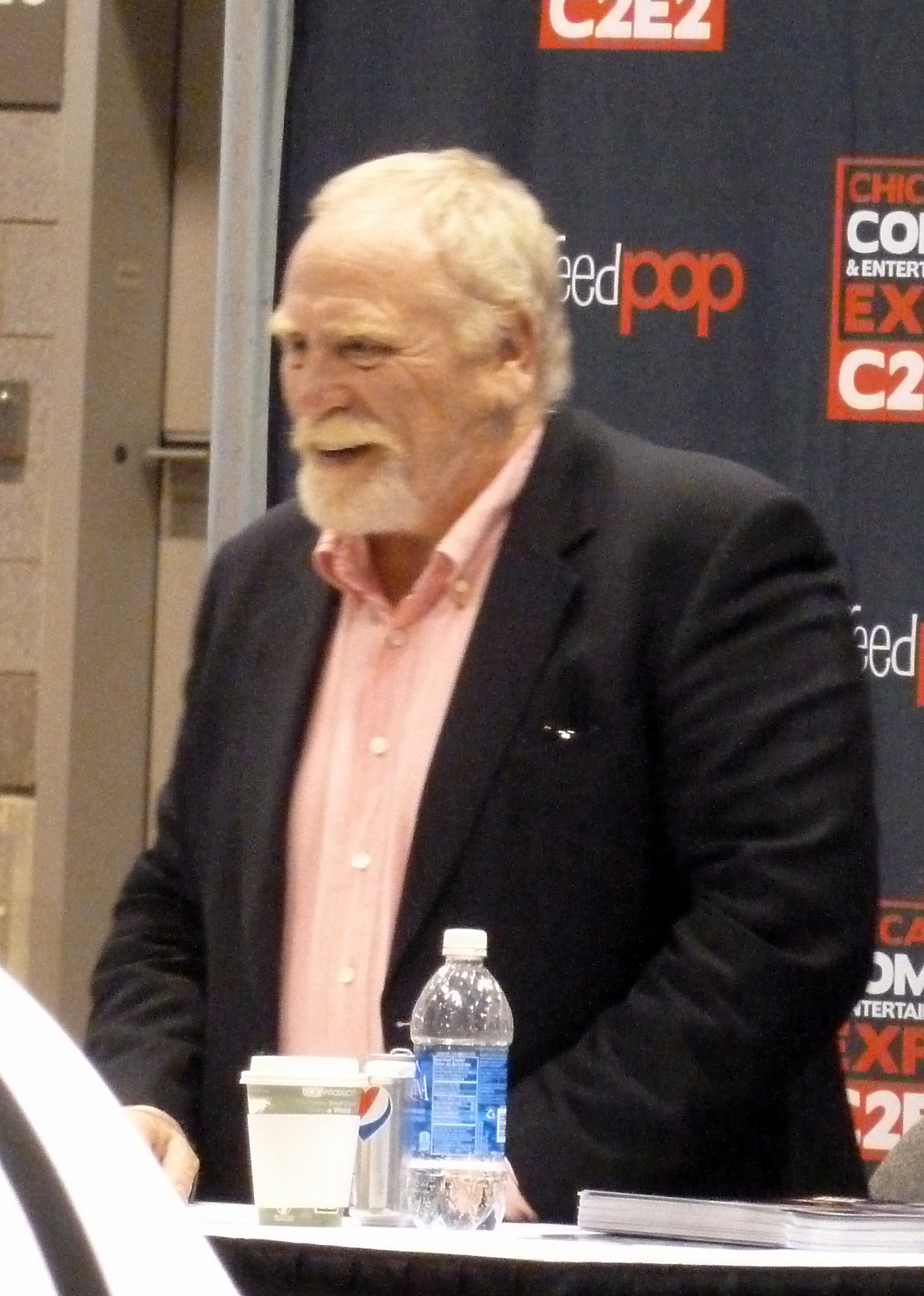
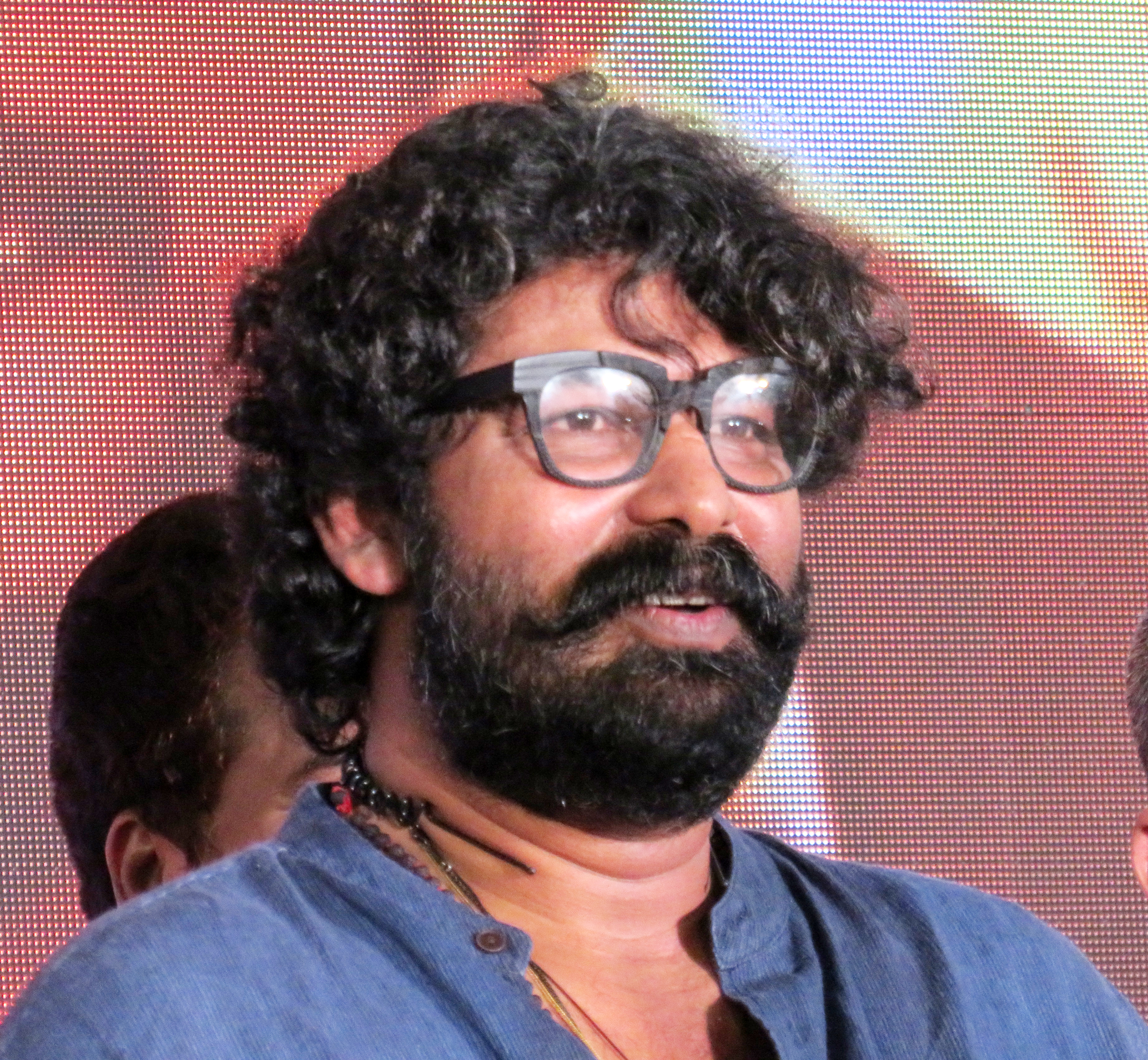
Dhanush (top), James Cosmo (middle) and Joju George (bottom), play the principal characters, Suruli, Peter Sprott and Sivadoss respectively
- Dhanush as Suruli
- James Cosmo as Peter Sprott
- Joju George as Sivadoss
- Aishwarya Lekshmi as Attilla
- Kalaiyarasan as Deepan
- Deepak Paramesh as Dharani
- Roman Fiori as John
- Gajaraj as Murugesan
- Vadivukkarasi as Manimegalai
- Sharath Ravi as Vicky
- Ramachandran Durairaj as Ram
- Vettai Muthukumar as Rajan
- Soundararaja as Paraman
- Ashwanth Ashokkumar as Dheeran
- Sanchana Natarajan as Valli
- Hema Dayal as Dancer
- Baba Bhaskar as Theerthamalai

== Production ==
=== Development ===
While attending a special screening of his own Jigarthanda (2014) at a film festival in New York City, Karthik Subbaraj planned a gangster film set in foreign locations. In April 2016, it was announced that Dhanush agreed to produce the film under the actor's home banner Wunderbar Films, apart from playing the lead. The makers unsuccessfully approached American actors Morgan Freeman, Robert De Niro and Al Pacino about playing a key role in the film during October 2016. Karthik later lamented that the process of reaching out to the actors was difficult, and that it was often difficult to get past casting agents.

The rights for the film's production were later exchanged to Thenandal Studio Limited in 2017. However, the company later backed out of the project as they opted to prioritise Mersal (2017). S. Sashikanth of YNOT Studios revived up the project in 2018. Karthik said that the filming would begin after his completion of Rajinikanth's Petta. On 19 July 2019, Sashikanth officially announced the project's launch, titled as #D40 with Subbaraj's regular collaborator, Santhosh Narayanan scoring the music, as well as cinematographer Shreyaas Krishna and editor Vivek Harshan, who worked with the director's previous projects Jigarthanda, Iraivi, Mercury and Petta.

While the film was tentatively titled as #D40, there were rumours claiming that the film's title was Suruli or Ulagam Suttrum Vaaliban (referring to the 1975 film of the same name), whereas Sashikanth claimed that there is no official announcement regarding the film's title. The film's title Jagame Thandhiram was announced during the release of the film's motion poster on 19 February 2020, referring to a line from the song "Sambo Siva Sambo", written by Kannadasan, from the 1979 film Ninaithale Inikkum. Karthik Subbaraj initially considered Suruli as the film's title, but one day, he happened to listen to the Ninaithale Inikkum song, and also being a fan of Rajinikanth who appeared in that film, the director felt Jagame Thandhiram would be the apt title for his script.

=== Casting ===
In an interview, Karthik Subbaraj stated that the process of finalising a Hollywood actor was going through a casting agent, and "once the casting agent is impressed with the script, the makers need to make an offer and the number of days required for shooting, after which the actor will have three weeks time to accept [or] reject the offer. Only after the three weeks, can the makers approach another actor." During the official announcement of the project, it was reported that Malayalam actress Aishwarya Lekshmi will play the female lead, in her second Tamil film, after Action (2019). In September 2019, Scottish actor James Cosmo signed up for the character Peter Sprott, Malayalam actor Joju George, and Kalaiyarasan were also confirmed in the film's cast in the same month.

Initially S. J. Suryah was approached to play the main antagonist Sivadoss, but the role went to Joju, marking his Tamil debut. George initially stated that he admired Karthik's works after his directorial debut with Pizza (2012) and tried to approach Karthik, but he could not get a chance. He stated that "Karthik asked me to audition for this role since it was a huge character. He narrated a scene and asked me to act. I acted it out and said the dialogues in broken Tamil. He simply smiled at me, and I was so happy." Cosmo, who made his debut in Indian cinema with this film, described his character as a powerful London-based gangster: "He employs the character played by Dhanush to fix the problems created by Indian gangs in London. During the course of this, he grows fond of Dhanush, which changes the whole dynamics of his gang. That's how the story moves forward."

=== Filming ===
Principal photography began on 4 September 2019, in London. The makers planned to shoot the entire stretch of portions in London, within a single schedule. On 7 November 2019, the makers announced that they had completed the London schedule within 64 days. Major portions of the film were also shot in Madurai and Rajasthan. Principal photography wrapped in December 2019, with Dhanush calling it one of the "quickest" films in his career. Post-production process took place in London in March 2020. However, it was put on hold shortly thereafter due to the COVID-19 pandemic. It later resumed in May 2020, after the Tamil Nadu government granted permission.

== Themes ==
Karthik Subbaraj revealed in an interview that Jagame Thandhiram, apart from being a gangster film, explores the themes of xenophobia, cultural shifts, and also what the meaning of 'home' is to different people. He added the film "started off as a gangster story initially, where two explosive personalities face off against each other; one from the Western world and one from Madurai. After that, the script demanded we go to a foreign land and shoot there; we didn't travel to London just for the sake of fancy locations. The themes explored in the film are very, very real and something that is very relevant and happening to all of us right now. Most of us... we're all lucky to say that this is the land we belong to, and this is our home country. But there is a different world, where it is tough for many people to even identify what their idea of 'home' is, where they come from and most importantly, where they belong."

In a live conversation with his fans through Twitter Spaces, Dhanush said that the character Suruli will have "shades of Rajinikanth's mannerisms in the film"; Dhanush, though a fan of Rajinikanth, avoided imitating the actor's mannerisms in his early films, but Karthik said "Let Rajini be there" for this film. The film further deals with the conflict between the Government of Sri Lanka and the Liberation Tigers of Tamil Eelam; Karthik stated that it is about "man-made boundaries and whether homes unite or separate".

Speaking about the film's script, Karthik, in an interview to LetsOTT, stated, "Gangster films have more scope" for unpredictability. He added that films such as The Godfather (1972) and Scarface (1980) are not only about violence, but also the emotions they carry. While the former is about legacy, the latter is about "brother-sister sentiment" and Karthik believed that "a strong emotion connected with any story has more scope to connect with the audiences".

== Music ==
The soundtrack to Jagame Thandhiram was composed by Santhosh Narayanan. Lyrics for the songs were written by Vivek, Dhanush, Arivu, Anthony Daasan and Madurai Babaraj. According to Santhosh, as the film is "British in many ways", he got to collaborate with British and Scottish folk bands and musicians, while also exploring Madurai's folk music. "Rakita Rakita" was the first song recorded live outside his studio, since he "wanted it to be a listener's experience". "Rakita Rakita" was released as the first single on 28 July 2020, coinciding with Dhanush's birthday. Dhanush himself sang the song, with additional vocals provided by Santhosh and Dhee.

The second single "Bujji", sung by Anirudh Ravichander, was released on 13 November 2020. The third single "Nethu" which was sung and written by Dhanush, was released on 22 May 2021. The soundtrack album was launched by Sony Music on 7 June 2021.

Dhanush, Karthik, Santhosh Narayanan and the musical team of Jagame Thandhiram conducted a session in early June through Twitter Spaces to mark the soundtrack's release. It was the highest attended Twitter Spaces session with 17,000 participants, until it was broken by #CelebrateThalapathyWithRoute, another session which had over 27,000 listeners.

== Release ==
=== Streaming ===
Jagame Thandhiram was initially scheduled to release on 1 May 2020, but was then indefinitely delayed due to the pandemic. The producers themselves confirmed that the film will be scheduled for a theatrical release, refuting rumours of releasing the film directly through a streaming service.

Without any pre-announcement, on 22 February 2021, the teaser trailer for the film was unveiled by Netflix India, through their official YouTube channel, thus confirming the release through the streaming platform. On 27 April 2021, the makers announced that Jagame Thandhiram will release on 18 June 2021. Apart from being dubbed in Telugu (as Jagame Tantram), Malayalam, Kannada and Hindi languages, the film would be dubbed and released in 17 languages, and premiere in over 190 countries through Netflix.

Before the film's direct-to-streaming release was confirmed, there were rumours of a rift between Dhanush and Sashikanth, with Dhanush reportedly angered that Sashikanth was opting for this move, irrespective of theatres being reopened and operating with 50% seating capacity due to pandemic restrictions. Karthik supported Dhanush and advocated for a theatrical release. Dhanush's fans also demanded the film's theatrical release by sticking wall posters across Tamil Nadu. With the film's teaser released on 22 February 2021, confirming the direct-to-streaming release through Netflix, fans of Dhanush expressed their disappointment as they intended to watch the film in theatres, despite the teaser being positively received by fans. Dhanush decided to stay out of the film's promotional activities online, after being upset with the producer's decision for streaming release, although he shared the film's trailer through his tweet expressing his unhappiness over the film releasing on Netflix and not in theatres.

=== Marketing ===
The first look poster of Jagame Thandhiram, released in February 2020, pays homage to Last Supper, a painting by Leonardo da Vinci. Commenting on his name being excluded from promotional posters released by Netflix, Karthik believed "it is their policy to not included a director’s name in promotions" and noted that he was promoting his own poster designs through his social media accounts. He added, "It would be nice if Netflix can change their policy in future". A graffiti art for Jagame Thandhiram was created by graffiti artist NME. Netflix India promoted NME's graffiti art through their social media handles in May 2021.

Amul released an advertisement with a still inspired by the film. A Twitter emoji was also unveiled ahead of the release, becoming Dhanush's first film to do so. The film's trailer was recreated by Ikorodu Bois, a Nigerian comedy group known for recreating promos of Money Heist and other streaming series. Their video has been posted on their Instagram page. In June 2021, stills and promotional videos from the film were showcased at the Times Square in New York City.

=== Home media ===
Jagame Thandhiram had its television premiere on Star Vijay, two months after its streaming release. Karthik revealed that three songs (including "Bujji") were removed from the film's final cut to accommodate its length, and would instead be featured during the television broadcast.

== Critical reception ==
Jagame Thandhiram received mixed reviews from critics. On the review aggregator website Rotten Tomatoes, 30% of 10 critics' reviews are positive, with an average rating of 5.3/10.

Natalia Winkelman of The New York Times said the screenplay (by Karthik Subbaraj) elevated the "usual crime antics by drawing attention to language, and how it can be used as a weapon or a unifier". She added that few sequences in the film feel "fresh", but called the movie's patterns "familiar". M. Suganth of The Times of India rated three of five stars for the film and called few sequences in the first half, featuring Dhanush "interesting", but criticised the slow-paced second half of the film. He also commented that "Subbaraj used the struggle of Eelam Tamils to add depth", but criticised that the attempt "does not make the scenes moving". Srivatsan S of The Hindu opined that Karthik Subbaraj wanted to have a bit of everything in the film, which is "a drama with an ultra-cool gangster (Dhanush) at the centre", "a serious political film dealing with a global issue", and "a stylishly-shot bubblegum film with a carefree attitude", but called that it "does not quite achieve the desired results".

Saibal Chatterjee of NDTV rated two-and-a-half out of five, calling that "the tedium is lessened by the ebullience of Dhanush and the solidity of Joju George". He further praised James Cosmo's performance as it "makes the most of the over-the-top quality of the larger-than-life villain". Sudhir Srinivasan of The New Indian Express called Jagame Thandhiram as "Karthik Subbaraj's weakest film", but praised the other technical aspects of the film such as music, cinematography and picturisation. He added this film as like "Karthik Subbaraj's desire to make two different Tamil films set in the West", with one, a solemn film like Iraivi that would bleed for "immigrants, refugees and Eelam Tamils". Nandini Ramanath of Scroll.in called that "overstuffed with Subbaraj's trademark flourishes, Jagame Thandhiram seeks to be something more than a gangster movie"; she praised Dhanush's performance in the film as "magnetic, as the messiah of immigrants", while also calling Cosmo as "the archvillain whose bark is worse than his bite" and George as "dignified as the Robin Hood of the British underworld".

In a contrasting review, Firstpost-based critic Ranjani Krishnakumar gave one star for the film, calling it as "confused", "self-indulgent", and "inconsiderate". She pointed that the film did not make up its mind between "being an empathetic story about xenophobia" or a "massy gangster film about a borderline psychopath", though it has "moments of both neither building on the other, ends up as a silly mess". Haricharan Pudipeddi of Hindustan Times stated that "Karthik Subaraj tried to pull a Kabali with Dhanush, but it disappoints big time". He further criticised the casting of foreign actors and the editing, being "chopped and stitched together in a way that some scenes absolutely make no sense". The News Minute editor-in-chief, Sowmya Rajendran, gave three out of five stars saying "There are some wildly fun moments in the film, but they don't add up to give us anything meaningful".

Shubhra Gupta of The Indian Express rated two-and-a-half out of five saying, "Dhanush-in-veshti strides across sleety England streets in slo-mo, doing Rajini but wisely keeping it low key, channelling the street-smart, lovable scamp he specialises in, when not going all out gangsta familiar to us from such cracking films as Vada Chennai." Sajesh Mohan of Onmanorama gave three out of five saying "Jagame Thandhiram could not be considered equal to Pa. Ranjith's Kaala or Kabali, where the director used the popular figure of Rajinikanth and his Style Mannan avatar to drive home a political and ideological point. But it definitely will hold its place." Baradwaj Rangan of Film Companion South called the film, based on an important issue, is "flamboyantly" but "generically" made, which could have been "Suruli's coming-of-age story, about him wrapping his head around the refugee crisis". Writing for the same website, Vishal Menon called the film's "righteous self-importance just does not fit into the world it tries to build for itself".
