= Akashvani =

Akashvani may refer to:

- Akashvani (word), a Sanskrit term commonly used in Hindu and Buddhist mythology
- Akashvani (radio broadcaster), previously known as All India Radio
- Akaash Vani, a 2013 Indian Hindi romance film
- Aakashvani, a 2016 Indian Malayalam comedy film starring Vijay Babu
- Aakashavaani, a 2021 Indian Telugu film by Ashwin Gangaraju
- Akash Vaani, an Indian TV series
