= Deepak Paramesh =

Indian actor (born 1988)

- Born: 19 April 1988 (age 38); Madras, Tamil Nadu, India
- Occupation: Actor
- Years active: 2014–present

Deepak Paramesh is an Indian actor, who has appeared in Tamil language films.

== Career ==
Deepak regularly worked on short films and was closely associated with Karthik Subbaraj, eventually featuring in two anthology films released by the director, Bench Talkies - The First Bench (2015) and Aviyal (2016). Deepak's first film as a lead actor, the horror drama Unakkenna Venum Sollu (2015), garnered mixed reviews and went unnoticed at the box office. Away from films, Deepak gained a fan following through his impersonations on Dubsmash, where he produced videos impersonating Kamal Haasan and Rajinikanth.

In 2018, he appeared in a leading role in Karthik Subbaraj's silent thriller Mercury as one of the four youngsters who become stuck in a remote village. Following the successful collaboration, Karthik Subbaraj signed him on to star in Petta (2019), a big-budget film starring Rajinikanth. He will also next be seen in a thriller film titled Redrum alongside Ashok Selvan. He also signed up for two more films with director Karthik Subbaraj acting in Jagame Thandhiram, which released directly on Netflix in 2020, followed by Mahaan, which also had a direct premiere on Amazon Prime in 2021.

== Filmography ==
Year	Title	Role	Notes
2014	Burma	Charles	
2015	Bench Talkies - The First Bench	Amit Krishnan	
2015	Unakkenna Venum Sollu	Karthik	
2016	Aviyal	Filmmaker, Dosa's friend	Acted in segments Kalam and Kanneer Anjali
2018	Mercury		
2019	Petta	Michael's friend	
2020	Yen Peyar Anandhan	Anwar	
2021	Jagame Thandhiram	Dharani	
2022	Mahaan	Anthony	
2022	Akash Vaani	Akash's friend	TV series
2025	Ground Zero	Binu Ramachandra	Hindi film
2026	Vowels	Kamal	Anthology film; segment "Varnajaalam"
