= Karthik Subbaraj =

Indian film director, film producer and screenwriter (born 1983)

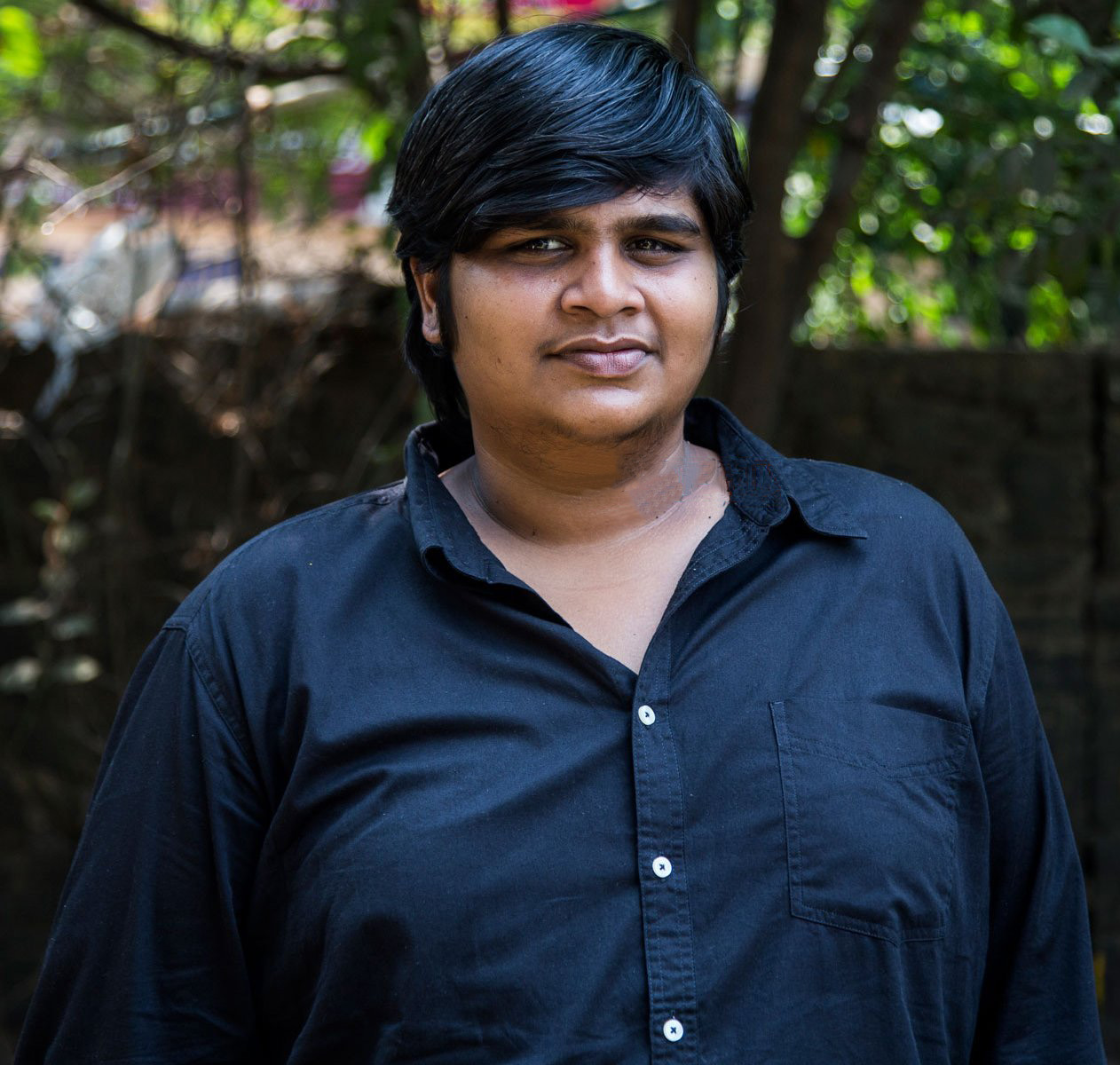
- Karthik at Iraivi Press Meet in 2016
- Born: March 19, 1983 (age 43); Madurai, Tamil Nadu, India
- Education: Thiagarajar College of Engineering
- Occupations: Film director; Film producer; Screenwriter
- Years active: 2012–present
- Spouse: Sathya Prema (m. 2011)
- Relatives: Gajaraj (Father)

Karthik Subbaraj (born 19 March 1983) is an Indian film director, producer and screenwriter working mainly in Tamil cinema.

== Early life ==
Karthik Subbaraj born in Madurai. He did his schooling from SBOA Matriculation and Higher Secondary School, Madurai after which he went on to study mechatronics at Thiagarajar College of Engineering. During his college days he performed stage shows and skits. His father, Gajaraj, is an actor who has acted in many supporting roles in films like Mundasupatti and Kabali.

He made the short film Kaatchipizhai in Madurai, which was selected for Nalaya Iyakunar.

== Career ==
Karthik had intended to direct Jigarthanda first but could not fund the project. He then came up with the story for the low-budget Pizza. The film was a commercial success, remade in Hindi, Bengali and Kannada. This allowed him the opportunity to make Jigarthanda, which received positive reviews and earned actor Bobby Simha a national award. Karthik was praised by S. Shankar and Mani Ratnam.

His third movie, Iraivi (2016), received positive reviews, and Karthik was praised for the film's portrayal of society's treatment of women. The movie also observed the various ways men's attitudes and behaviors impact women throughout life. He also showcased the pain he went through from the producer of his second film, through the character of S. J. Suryah. He then went on and directed a silent thriller, Mercury (2018), starring Prabhu Deva in the lead, which was not a commercial success. He produced Kallachirippu, a web series under his banner Stone Bench Creations.

Karthik directed the action drama Petta (2019) with Rajinikanth's 166th film. He also produced the Amazon original movie Penguin starring Keerthy Suresh in the lead role. He then produced the Hotstar Originals web series Triples starring Jai and Vani Bhojan.

He then directed Miracle, a short film for the Amazon Prime anthology film Putham Pudhu Kaalai (2020), and Peace, an episode for the Netflix anthology web series Navarasa (2021). In 2021, Karthik directed Jagame Thandhiram, which received mixed reviews.

His next film was the Vikram starrer Mahaan (2022) which was directly premiered on Amazon Prime Video. The movie received positive reviews from critics. In 2023, he went on to direct Jigarthanda DoubleX.

He then directed Retro, starring Suriya and Pooja Hegde. It opened to positive reviews from critics praising his direction and storytelling. The film became a commercial success at box office. In November 2025, Karthik began production on his 10th directorial, produced by Guneet Monga, which was later titled Dorothy.

== Filmmaking style ==
Some critics note that Karthik's directorial films usually have plot twists, needledropping of songs composed by Ilaiyaraaja, flamboyance inspired by Quentin Tarantino's films, and the inclusion of real-life world events and politics in the form of messaging. Karthik, however, has stated that he prefers not to associate with any particular filmmaking style as he seeks to reinvent himself with every new film, noting how he intentionally avoided including a plot twist in Jagame Thandhiram, which disappointed some audiences.

== Filmography ==
=== As a director ===
Key
†	Denotes films that have not yet been released

Year	Title	Notes	Ref.
2012	Pizza		
2014	Jigarthanda		
2015	Bench Talkies	Anthology film; segment: Neer	
2016	Iraivi		
2018	Mercury		
2019	Petta		
2020	Putham Pudhu Kaalai	Anthology film; segment: Miracle	
2021	Jagame Thandhiram		
2021	Navarasa	Television series; segment: Peace	
2022	Mahaan		
2023	Jigarthanda DoubleX	Ananda Vikatan Cinema Award for Best Director	
2025	Retro	Also writer	
2026	Dorothy		

=== As a producer and writer ===
Year	Title	Producer	Writer	Language	Notes	Ref.
2016	Aviyal	Yes	No	Tamil		
2017	Meyaadha Maan	Yes	No	Tamil		
2018	Kallachirippu	Yes	No	Tamil	ZEE5 original series	
2020	Penguin	Yes	No	Tamil		
2020	Triples	Yes	No	Tamil	Hotstar original series	
2021	Boomika	Yes	No	Tamil		
2022	Attention Please	Presenter	No	Malayalam		
2022	Buffoon	Yes	No	Tamil		
2022	Ammu	Yes	No	Telugu		
2025	Game Changer	No	Story	Telugu		
2026	Neelira	Yes	No	Tamil		
2026	29	Yes	No	Tamil		

=== As an actor ===
Year	Title	Role	Notes
2013	Soodhu Kavvum	Jaguar car owner	Cameo appearance
2019	Petta	Motorcycle driver	Uncredited appearance

=== Frequent collaborators ===
Collaborator	Pizza; (2012)	Jigarthanda; (2014)	Iraivi; (2016)	Mercury; (2018)	Petta; (2019)	Jagame Thandhiram; (2021)	Mahaan; (2022)	Jigarthanda DoubleX; (2023)	Retro; (2025)	Dorothy; (2026)	Total
Santhosh Narayanan	Yes	Yes	Yes	Yes		Yes	Yes	Yes	Yes		8
Tirru				Yes	Yes			Yes		Yes	4
Shreyaas Krishna						Yes	Yes		Yes		3
Vivek Harshan		Yes	Yes	Yes	Yes	Yes	Yes				6
Shafique Mohammed Ali								Yes	Yes		2
Gajaraj	Yes	Yes	Yes	Yes	Yes	Yes	Yes		Yes	Yes	9
Bobby Simha	Yes	Yes	Yes		Yes		Yes				5
Ramachandran Durairaj		Yes	Yes		Yes	Yes	Yes		Yes	Yes	7
Aadukalam Naren	Yes	Yes			Yes		Yes				4
Sananth				Yes	Yes		Yes	Yes (uncredited)		Yes	5
Vijay Sethupathi	Yes	Yes (cameo)	Yes		Yes						4
Vettai Muthukumar					Yes	Yes	Yes		Yes	Yes	5
Deepak Paramesh				Yes	Yes	Yes	Yes				4
Karunakaran	Yes	Yes	Yes						Yes		4
S. J. Suryah			Yes					Yes			2
Joju George						Yes			Yes		2
Vidhu					Yes			Yes	Yes		3
