= Unakkenna Venum Sollu =

2015 Indian film by Srinath Ramalingam

- Theatrical release poster
- Directed by: Srinath Ramalingam
- Written by: N. Shanmuga Sundaram
- Produced by: N. Shanmuga Sundaram
- Starring: Deepak Paramesh; Jaqlene Prakash
- Cinematography: Manish Murthy
- Music by: Siva Saravanan
- Production company: Juna Pictures
- Distributed by: Auraa Cinemas
- Release date: 24 September 2015
- Country: India
- Language: Tamil

Unakkenna Venum Sollu (transl. Tell Me What You Want) is a 2015 Indian Tamil-language horror film produced by N. Shanmuga Sundaram and the directorial debut of Srinath Ramalingam. The film stars Deepak Paramesh, Jaqlene Prakash, Gunalan Morgan and Anu. It was released on 24 September 2015.

== Plot ==
Lovers Karthik and Pooja are in a live-in relationship. When Pooja realizes that she is pregnant, her friend advises to go for an abortion, which Karthik opposes. Karthik loses his job and goes to Singapore to earn money, Pooja delivers the child and leaves it at an orphanage, then tells Karthik that their child died. The couple parts ways. Pooja marries Shiva and gives birth to his child. When Pooja and Shiva arrive at Chennai to treat their son, who has a lethal disease, they experience paranormal activity in their guest house. Mathew, an exorcist, says Daisy, who is Pooja's abandoned daughter, is the ghost. It is learnt that Daisy was adopted from the orphanage by Judy, a psychologically affected woman, and she was unable to take care of Daisy, so she dies as a baby. The rest of the film deals with of how Mathew sends Daisy back to the other world.

== Cast ==
- Deepak Paramesh as Karthik
- Jaqlene Prakash as Pooja
- Gunalan Morgan as Shiva
- Anu as Daisy
- Mime Gopi as Mathew
- Mourhrna Anetha Reddy as Judy
- Khomala Lea as Swetha
- Boys Rajan as Dr. Gurumoorthy
- Balaji Raj as Dr. Rudra
- Amarasigamani as Swetha's father
- Gopi Kannadasan as Doctor
- Madurai R. Saroja as Hospital Cleaner

== Production ==
Unakkenna Venum Sollu is the directorial debut of Srinath Ramalingam. It was originally titled Daisy, but was later retitled Unakkenna Venum Sollu after the song from Yennai Arindhaal. Srinath said he chose this title to give the film a wider reach, and added, "Since [Unakkenna Venum Sollu] is the popular melody of Ajith in Yennai Arindhaal, we thought this would be appropriate for the film as it deals with the relationship of a father and daughter." Producer N. Shanmuga Sundaram also served as the B-camera director and co-wrote the script. Principal photography took place in Chennai from July to September 2014 over the course of 45 working days.

== Release and reception ==
Unakkenna Venum Sollu was released on 24 September 2015 in India, and in Singapore the following day. Auraa Cinemas distributed the film worldwide. Sify said, "Debutant director Srinath Ramalingam’s [Unakkenna Venum Sollu] is a sincere attempt but has taken audience for granted as the execution falls flat." M. Suganth of The Times of India rated it 2 out of 5 saying, "Despite being a horror film, [Unakkenna Venum Sollu] is a largely bland film, with no real scary moments". Sudhir Srinivasan of The Hindu said, "Technically, [Unakkenna Venum Sollu] is quite refined. It’s all there: good background music (Siva Saravanan), a lot of well-composed shots in the dark (Manish Murthy)... The acting — especially Jaqlene Prakash, as the haunted Pooja — is in place too. So, what is the problem? The important parts of the film, like the dialogues, and the story."
