= Neelira =

2026 Tamil-language film

- Theatrical release poster
- Directed by: Someetharan
- Written by: Someetharan
- Produced by: Kaarthikeyan S; Karthik Subbaraj; Rana Daggubati; Kalyan Subramanian
- Starring: Naveen Chandra; Sananth; Kapila Venu; Roopa Koduvayur; Tharmeega Manimaran
- Cinematography: Selvarathinam Pradeepan
- Edited by: Radha Sridhar
- Music by: K
- Production companies: Stone Bench Studio; Spirit Media
- Distributed by: AGS Cinemas
- Release date: 3 April 2026
- Running time: 92 minutes
- Country: India
- Language: Tamil

Neelira (transl. Long Night) is a 2026 Indian Tamil-language war film written and directed by Someetharan. The film stars an ensemble cast including Naveen Chandra, Sananth, Kapila Venu, Roopa Koduvayur, and Tharmeega Manimaran. Set in Sri Lanka in 1988, the plot features a Sri Lankan Tamil family preparing for a wedding amidst the Sri Lankan civil war, but soon having their home invaded and be held hostage by a group of Indian Peace Keeping Force (IPKF) soldiers.

Jointly produced by Karthik Subbaraj and Rana Daggubati, the film was released theatrically on 3 April 2026. It received generally positive reviews from critics, who noted its realistic portrayal of the conflict's impact on civilians.

== Plot ==
In 1988 in Jaffna, amidst the Sri Lankan civil war, a Sri Lankan Tamil family is in the midst of preparing for the wedding of their daughter, Vasuki. On the eve of the wedding, a group of Indian Peace Keeping Force (IPKF) soldiers led by "Captain" inadvertently occupy the family's home due to a navigational error. Realising they are stranded without backup and surrounded by IPKF soldiers, the soldiers take refuge inside, effectively holding the family hostage.

== Cast ==
- Naveen Chandra as Captain
- Sananth as Castro / Devan
- Kapila Venu as Devaki
- Roopa Koduvayur as Thamizhini
- Tharmeega Manimaran
- Sidhu Kumaresan as Vasuki
- Vidhu as Muthappa
- Namasivayam Thambipillai
- Kayal Vincent
- Gajaraj

== Production ==
Neelira marks the feature film directorial debut of Someetharan, a Sri Lankan Tamil journalist and documentary filmmaker. Someetharan stated that the film was inspired by his own lived experiences growing up in a militarised zone in Jaffna. The film was produced by Kaarthikeyan S, Karthik Subbaraj, Rana Daggubati and Kalyan Subramanian under the banners of Stone Bench Studio and Spirit Media. The technical crew includes music composer K, cinematographer Selvarathinam Pradeepan and editor Radha Sridhar. The film was shot in 2023, primarily in Nagercoil, and included both Indian and Sri Lankan actors. Kapila Venu, previously a dancer, made her acting debut.

== Release and reception ==
Neelira was released in theatres on 3 April 2026, by AGS Cinemas. The film received generally positive reviews, with critics largely praising Someetharan's authentic writing, the tense chamber-drama format, and the performances of the ensemble cast.

K. Janani of India Today praised Naveen Chandra's "measured" acting, describing the film as a "quietly devastating" portrait of war. Baradwaj Rangan commended the "tight, tense drama" for effectively distilling the broader tragedy of Eelam Tamils through its single-night premise. Akshay Kumar of Cinema Express praised the cast and the film's incisive dialogue, but felt the tight 92-minute runtime occasionally rushed the character transformations. The film was also reviewed by Cinema Vikatan and Virakesari.
