= Vidhu (actor) =

Indian actor

- Born: Vidhyashankar Neelamegham; Coimbatore, Tamil Nadu, India
- Occupation: Actor
- Years active: 2006; 2019–present

Vidhyashankar Neelamegham, known professionally as Vidhu, is an Indian actor who predominantly works in Tamil cinema. He is known for frequently appearing in the works of director Karthik Subbaraj. Initially appearing as an extra in the film Petta (2019), he later took on significant roles in Jigarthanda DoubleX (2023) and Retro (2025). He landed his first leading film role in 29 (2026).

== Early life ==
Vidhu, whose real name is Vidhyashankar Neelamegham, is from Coimbatore. He studied at Sathyabama University in Chennai.

== Career ==
Vidhu initially worked as an engineer in Coimbatore for a year and a half to two years before moving to Chennai to pursue an acting career. Due to a lack of opportunities at the time, he returned to Coimbatore for a year and a half to work. However, he eventually decided to quit his job and pursue his goal of becoming an actor.

Vidhu claims that Karthik Subbaraj was the one who introduced him to the film industry. Vidhu first rose to prominence in the film Petta (2019), directed by Karthik, in which he played a minor role with limited screen time. Vidhu was only 29 when the film was released, but Karthik and Kaarthekeyen Santhanam encouraged him to seriously pursue an acting career. Subsequently, he continued to play supporting roles or villain in Karthik's films, including Jigarthanda DoubleX (2023) and Retro (2025).

In 2026, he played a supporting role in the film Neelira and a lead role in 29; both films were produced by Karthik Subbaraj. Among them, 29 was the first film in which he played the lead role. Also in 2026, he joined the cast of the film Manjanathi, directed by Mari Selvaraj, which began filming in September.

== Filmography ==
=== Film ===
Year	Title	Role	Notes	Ref.
2006	Sillunu Oru Kaadhal	Man talking on phone in restaurant	Uncredited appearance in the song "Munbe Vaa"	
2019	Petta	Michael's friend		
2020	Boomika	Gowtham	Debut as supporting role	
2023	Jigarthanda DoubleX	Shettani		
2025	Vallamai	Petrol thief		
2025	Retro	Michael Mirasu		
2026	Neelira	Muthappa		
2026	29	Sathya	Debut as lead	
TBA	Manjanathi			

=== Television ===
Year	Title	Role	Notes	Ref.
2021	Navarasa	Castro	Segment: "Peace"	
