= Tirru =

Indian cinematographer

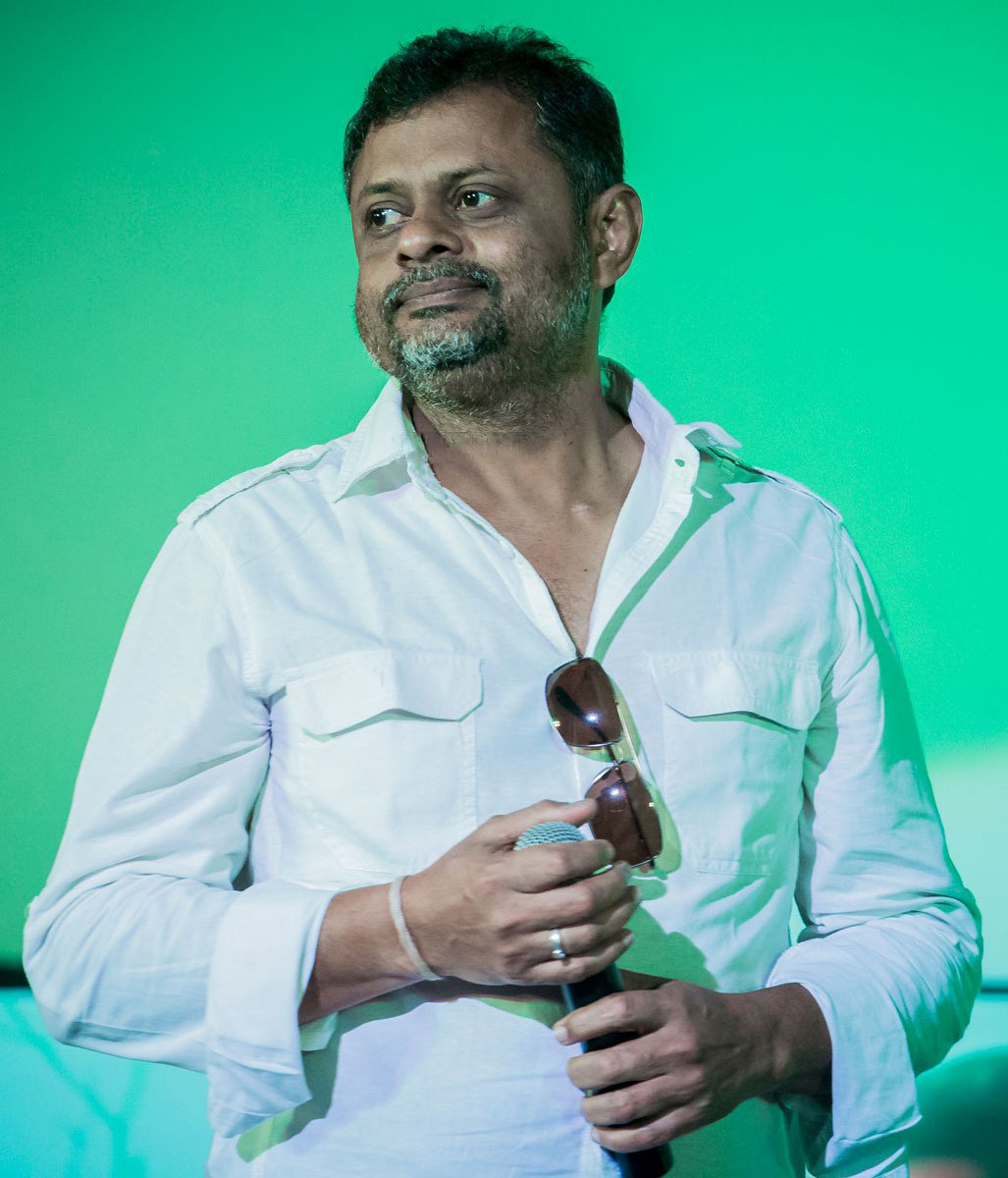
- Tirru in 2017
- Born: S. Thirunavukarasu
- Occupations: Cinematographer; Screenwriter
- Years active: 1994–present
- Notable work: Hey Ram (2000); Kanchivaram (2008); 24 (2016); Jigarthanda DoubleX (2023)
- Awards: National Film Awards (2016)

S. Thirunavukarasu better known mononymously as Tirru, is an Indian cinematographer and screenwriter who has worked in multiple languages across India. Born in Mullukuruchi village, Tirru became interested in photography when he was in college.

He gained recognition through collaborations with Kamal Haasan, contributing pioneering techniques in Indian cinema. His cinematography on 24 (2016), won the National Film Award for Best Cinematography.

== Personal life ==
Tirru became interested in photography while studying science in college. He was assisted by his cousin, a dentist by profession, in the latter's passion for nature photography.

== Film career ==
He co-wrote the screenplay of the Malayalam film Mission 90 Days with director Major Ravi. He is also known for television commercials.

=== Debut as cinematographer (1993) ===
Tirru began his career by assisting cinematographer P.C. Sreeram, working on four films during this period. Tirru's last project as an assistant was the film Thevar Magan (1992), which caught the attention of Kamal Haasan. This led to Tirru's first project as a cinematographer for Magalir Mattum (1994), directed by Singeetam Srinivasa Rao and produced by Kamal Haasan.

Srinivasa Rao wasn't used to working with newcomers and had doubts at first but Tirru convinced him with his technical skills in the opening shots. Kamal Haasan's faith in Tirru played a big role during his debut. During the filming of KT Kunjumon's Tamil movie Sakthi in 1997, the shoot was set in Pollachi. In one particular scene featuring charging wild elephants, Tirru and his assistant were on a 45-foot-high crane to shoot a scene. Unfortunately, the situation took a dangerous turn as still photographer Rajesh recounts, "Somehow, the mahouts lost control of the elephants, and they came charging towards the crane. We knew that if they hit the crane, we would fall to our deaths." to Cinema Express.

=== Collaboration with Kamal Haasan (1993–2001) ===
Early in his career, Tirru and Kamal Haasan has collaborated on four films, Magalir Mattum (1994), Kaathala Kaathala (1998), Hey Ram (2000) and Aalavandhan (2001). Aalavandhan pioneered the use of a motion control rig in India for capturing picture movement and Tirru was the first cinematographer to introduce it. Aalavandhan was also the first film to use animation sequences in the Indian film industry.

=== Post national award (2018–present) ===
In 2018, Karthik Subbaraj reached out to Tirru for the silent film Mercury as he wanted an experienced cinematographer capable of conveying a narrative without relying on dialogue. They worked on the pre-production planning for three months to address the challenges posed by the film's silent nature and unconventional genre.

In 2019, Tirru and Karthik Subbaraj collaborated again on the action-drama film Petta starring Rajinikanth. This was Tirru's first collaboration with Rajinikanth and it was a long-held dream of his as he had missed an opportunity previously to be the cinematographer of Enthiran (2010) directed by Shankar.

Tirru debuted in Kannada cinema with the action thriller Twenty One Hours (2022) directed by debutant Jaishankar Pandit. Jai Sankar has worked with Tirru on multiple television advertisements.

== Filmography ==
Year	Film	Language	Notes
1994	Magalir Mattum	Tamil	Debut
1997	Sakthi	Tamil	
1998	Kaathala Kaathala	Tamil	
1998	Priyuralu	Telugu	Debut in Telugu cinema; dubbed in Malayalam as Manjeeradhwani
2000	Hey Ram	Tamil; Hindi	Debut in Hindi cinema
2000	Champion	Hindi	
2001	Little John	Tamil; Hindi; English	
2001	Aalavandhan; Abhay	Tamil; Hindi	
2002	23rd March 1931: Shaheed	Hindi	
2003	Lesa Lesa	Tamil	
2003	Hungama	Hindi	
2003	Punarjani	Malayalam	
2003	Mullavalliyum Thenmavum	Malayalam	
2005	Garam Masala	Hindi	
2005	Kyon Ki	Hindi	
2006	Chup Chup Ke	Hindi	
2006	Keerthi Chakra	Malayalam	
2007	Kireedam	Tamil	Also featured segments shot by Nirav Shah
2007	Mission 90 Days	Malayalam	Also writer
2007	Bhool Bhulaiyaa	Hindi	
2008	Kanchivaram	Tamil	Filmfare Award for Best Cinematographer – South
2009	Ajab Prem Ki Ghazab Kahani	Hindi	
2010	Aakrosh	Hindi	
2012	Tezz	Hindi	
2013	Krrish 3	Hindi	
2013	Geethaanjali	Malayalam	
2016	24	Tamil	National Film Award for Best Cinematography; Filmfare Award for Best Cinematographer – South
2016	Janatha Garage	Telugu	
2017	Vanamagan	Tamil	
2018	Mercury	Tamil	
2018	Bharat Ane Nenu	Telugu	Also features segments shot by Ravi K. Chandran
2018	Fanney Khan	Hindi	
2019	Petta	Tamil	
2021	Eeswaran	Tamil	
2021	Marakkar: Lion of the Arabian Sea	Malayalam	
2022	Acharya	Telugu	
2022	Twenty One Hours	Kannada; Malayalam	
2023	Jigarthanda DoubleX	Tamil	
2025	Game Changer	Telugu	
2025	Sikandar	Hindi	
2026	Dorothy	Tamil	

== Awards ==
Awards and nominations received by Tirru
Award	Year	Category	Work(s)	Result	Ref.
7th Annual Screen Awards	2000	Best Cinematography	Hey Ram	Nominated	
Kerala Film Critics Association Awards	2003	Best Cinematography	Mullavalliyum Thenmavum	Won	
V. Shantharam Award	2008	Best Cinematography	Kanchivaram	Won	
Filmfare Awards	2008	Best Cinematography	Kanchivaram	Won	
Filmfare Awards	2016	Best Cinematography	24	Won	
National Film Awards	2016	Best Cinematography	24	Won	
