= Petta (film) =

2019 Indian film by Karthik Subbaraj

- Theatrical release poster
- Directed by: Karthik Subbaraj
- Written by: Karthik Subbaraj
- Produced by: Kalanithi Maran
- Starring: Rajinikanth; Vijay Sethupathi; Nawazuddin Siddiqui; Sasikumar; Simran; Trisha
- Cinematography: Tirru
- Edited by: Vivek Harshan
- Music by: Anirudh Ravichander
- Production company: Sun Pictures
- Distributed by: Sun Pictures
- Release date: 10 January 2019
- Running time: 170 minutes
- Country: India
- Language: Tamil
- Budget: est. ₹160 crore
- Box office: est. ₹220–240 crore (Note: Petta's reported worldwide grosses vary between ₹220 crore (Business Today) – ₹240 (Hindustan Times))

Petta (/peɪttə/; transl. Extramural suburb) is a 2019 Indian Tamil-language action drama film written and directed by Karthik Subbaraj and produced by Kalanithi Maran under Sun Pictures. The film stars Rajinikanth, alongside Vijay Sethupathi, Nawazuddin Siddiqui, Sasikumar, Simran, Trisha, Megha Akash, Malavika Mohanan, Mahendran, Bobby Simha, Guru Somasundaram, Aadukalam Naren, Munishkanth, Sananth and Vivek Prasanna. It follows a hostel warden who gets dragged into war after his old nemesis resurfaces.

The film was officially announced in February 2018. Principal photography commenced in June 2018. It was shot in several locations including Darjeeling and Uttar Pradesh, and wrapped by late-October 2018. The film's music was composed by Anirudh Ravichander, while cinematography and editing were handled by Tirru and Vivek Harshan.

Petta was released on 10 January 2019, the week of Pongal. The film grossed over ₹200 crore against a budget of ₹160 crore, thus becoming one of the highest-grossing Tamil films of all time and the second highest-grossing Tamil film of 2019.

== Plot ==
Kaali, a mysterious and deceivingly aged person, takes up the job of a boys' hostel warden at a college in Ooty. He notices that a group of unruly final-year students, led by Michael, the spoiled son of Gnanam, a local leader, dominate the hostel. Kaali puts a stop to Michael's antics, which leads to a rivalry between them. Kaali also forms a close bond with Anwar, an NRI hostelite, who is in a relationship with Anu, the daughter of Mangalam, a pranic healer.

Kaali convinces Mangalam to accept her daughter's relationship with Anwar, and they end up falling for each other. Michael, who lusts for Anu, is enraged on hearing about her relationship with Anwar and attempts to harass them, only to be stopped by Kaali. The college suspends Michael and his friends, and Anwar records and shares the humiliation of Michael and his gang. The video is noticed in Uttar Pradesh by Jithu, a local goon, and his father Singhaar Singh, a powerful politician.

On seeing Anwar in the video as well as in a photo with his mother Poongodi on Facebook, Singhaar sends his men to kill Anwar for unknown reasons. At the same time, Michael, who is humiliated at his suspension, sends his men to beat Kaali. Michael's plan backfires as he and his men get mixed in the fight between Kaali and Singhaar's men. Kaali subdues Singhaar's men, earning Michael and Gnanam's respect, following which Anwar meets Kaali's friend, who reveals Anwar's past. Anwar is the son of Kaali's best friend Abdul Maalik Marakkaayar, Kaali's real name is Pettavelan "Petta", and he was a respected person and gangster in Madurai.

In the past, Maalik learns that Singaar Singh (then known as Singaaram) and his brother Devaaram are involved in an illegal sand-mining mafia, which leads Maalik and Petta to gather enough evidence for the police to arrest Devaaram. Petta learns that Maalik is in love with Devaaram and Singaaram's sister Poongodi, who conceived with him even before wedlock. Though reluctant at first, Petta finally agrees, and he and his wife, Saro, convince Poongodi's father, Rajapandi, to marry Poongodi off to Maalik. Devaaram and Singaaram vehemently oppose the alliance since Maalik is a Muslim. But the marriage happens with the aid of Petta. Rajapandi, out of love and affection, transfers properties to Poongodi.

Devaaram and Singhaaram kill Rajapandi. On learning this, Petta kills Devaaram with a shotgun blast to the heart during Rajapandi's funeral and expels Singhaaram from the village. In revenge, Singaaram orchestrates a bomb blast during Poongodi's seemantham, killing Saro and seemingly Petta's son Chinnan, and has his men open fire, killing Maalik and the remaining survivors at the seemantham. Petta finds Poongodi still alive and takes her to safety. Poongodi later gives birth to Anwar, and leaves for Australia with him to evade Singaaram.

In the present, Anwar, Petta and Michael's henchmen leave to kill Singaaram, who lives under an alias, Singhaar Singh. Petta and Anwar confront Jithu, who is determined to kill them after learning about them from Singhaar. The duo manages to escape Jithu. Later, Petta meets Jithu privately and reveals him to be actually his son Chinnan, whom Singhaar adopted after finding him alive with injuries in the wreckage.

Jithu confronts Singhaar regarding his parentage, and Singhaar is shocked and does not respond. Later, a group of men, apparently sent by Singhaar, arrive to kill Jithu, but Petta and his crew rescue him. Petta, Anwar, Michael's henchmen and Jithu ambush Singhaar's mansion and decimate his guards. Petta personally confronts Singhaar and has him killed.

With his vengeance fulfilled, Petta admits to Jithu that he fabricated the story of Jithu's parentage since the real Chinnan did die in the blast; the men sent to kill Jithu were actually Petta's men. He reveals that he manipulated Jithu to enter Singhaar's mansion and kill him. After debating whether to kill or spare Jithu, Petta holds him at gunpoint.

== Cast ==
- Rajinikanth as Kaali / Pettavelan "Petta"
- Vijay Sethupathi as Jithu
- Nawazuddin Siddiqui as Singhaar Singh / Singaaram
- Sasikumar as Abdul Maalik Marakkaayar
- Simran as Mangalam
- Trisha as Saro
- Megha Akash as Anu
- Malavika Mohanan as Poongodi
- Mahendran as Rajapandi
- Bobby Simha as Michael
- Guru Somasundaram as District Collector
- Aadukalam Naren as Gnanam
- Munishkanth as Chittu
- Sananth as Anwar
- Vivek Prasanna as a college professor
- Vettai Muthukumar as Devaaram
- Manikandan Achari as Gnanam's henchman
- Kai Thennavan as Minister Thangam
- Ramachandran Durairaj as Gnanam's henchman
- Gajaraj as Shanmugam
- Shabeer Kallarakkal as Arjith
- Venkatesh as Selva Vinayagam
- Deepak Paramesh as Michael's friend
- Vidhu as Michael's friend
- Adithya Shivpink as Michael's friend

Cameo appearances

- Y. G. Mahendran as Ram Prakash
- Vaibhav as Idhayam Murali (in the song "Aaha Kalyanam")
- Chinni Jayanth as Cheenu

Uncredited

- Karthik Subbaraj as motorcycle driver
- Sathya Prema as the officer who gives Petta his offer letter

== Production ==
=== Development ===
In early February 2018, after completing his filming commitments for Pa. Ranjith's Kaala (2018), Rajinikanth held final discussions with a group of young directors, including Arun Prabu, Atlee, and Karthik Subbaraj for his next project. On 23 February 2018, Sun Pictures announced that they would produce a film starring Rajinikanth to be directed by Karthik. To accommodate the film's shoot throughout the course of 2018, Karthik postponed the pre-production work of another proposed film starring Dhanush for YNOT Studios. Karthik revealed that he was confident about approaching Rajinikanth to work on his film, after the actor was impressed with his earlier project, Jigarthanda (2014) and expressed a desire to collaborate. The pair had first discussed the script in early 2017, but Rajinikanth did not take a final call until finishing his existing filming commitments to Kaala and 2.0 (2018). Karthik initially revealed that his film with Rajinikanth would be an "action drama", which was "fictional" but "realistic".

Anirudh Ravichander was signed on to work as the film's music composer in early March 2018, in a move which saw him collaborate with his maternal uncle Rajinikanth, and Karthik, for the first time. Tirru and Vivek Harshan were selected to be the film's cinematographer and editor respectively, continuing their collaboration with Karthik following their work in Mercury (2018). Likewise, stunt choreographer Peter Hein also joined the team thereafter. In late May 2018, Karthik and Tirru went on a recce to scout locations in Nepal and North India to shoot the film. The film's title Petta was revealed on 7 September 2018.

=== Casting ===
Vijay Sethupathi was signed on to play a character in April 2018, and accordingly reworked his dates to fit the film into his busy schedule. The actor signed the film after a month of media speculation that he would portray a villainous role, and revealed that he signed the film as he had blind trust in Karthik, and initially did not request to listen to the script. Karthik had also been keen to sign Fahadh Faasil for a role in the film, but the actor's filming commitments for Varathan (2018) meant that he could not allot dates. Hindi film actor Nawazuddin Siddiqui joined the cast in July 2018, while two other regular collaborators of Karthik, actors Bobby Simha and Sananth, were also signed to play pivotal roles in the film. Other members of the cast included supporting actors Guru Somasundaram, Munishkanth, Shabeer Kallarakkal, Deepak Paramesh, Adithya Shivpink, and Manikandan R. Achari.

For leading female roles, the team held discussions throughout March 2018 with actresses Trisha, Deepika Padukone, and Anjali, but neither were signed. In July 2018, the producers announced that Simran had joined the cast to play as pair of Rajinikanth. Trisha was eventually added to the cast in August 2018, while Malavika Mohanan was also signed to make her Tamil debut. Megha Akash was cast as Sananth's pair, and joined the shoot before the release of any of her initial Tamil films, Boomerang, Enai Noki Paayum Thota and Oru Pakka Kathai. In October, Sasikumar and Mahendran joined the cast.

=== Filming ===
Principal photography began in June 2018. The first shooting schedule began on 7 June at Eastern Forest Rangers College at St. Mary's Hill, Kurseong in Darjeeling, with the initial portions lasting nine days. The team then shot in other location across Darjeeling and the hill towns for a further month, in locations including St. Paul's and Mount Hermon School. To finish the first schedule, the team returned to Kurseong for six days. An audition to cast 150 local actors was also held in Charbagh, Lucknow during the first schedule. During the making of the schedule, Rajinikanth met with politician Gautam Deb, who helped the makers have a hassle free shoot in exchange for the promotion of tourism in the area. Principal photography wrapped in October 2018, fifteen days ahead of schedule.

== Music ==
The soundtrack album and background score were composed by Anirudh Ravichander, marking his first collaboration with Rajinikanth and Karthik Subbaraj. The lyrics were penned by Vivek, Ku. Karthik, Dhanush and Karthik Subbaraj. The album consists of all eleven songs, 5 of which are theme songs. The first single, "Marana Mass" was released on 3 December 2018, followed by "Ullallaa" which released on 7 December 2018. The full album was released on 9 December 2018, under the Sony Music label.

== Release ==
Petta was released on 10 January 2019, the week of Pongal, and clashing with Viswasam. A Kannada-dubbed version was planned but ultimately never made as Rajinikanth refused to dub for said version.

== Reception ==
=== Box office ===
Petta was released on 600 screens in Tamil Nadu with tough competition from Viswasam. The film opened with ₹1.12 crore at the Chennai box office. It also grossed $133K from the United States, overtaking Viswasam which grossed $18K. The film collected ₹105 crore (US$14.91 million) worldwide in 4 days, and over ₹200 crore (US$28.4 million) within 23 days. According to a late January 2019 estimate by India Today, Petta collected ₹135 crore (US$19.17 million) in Tamil Nadu, ₹15 crore (US$2.13 million) in Karnataka, ₹11 crore (US$1.56 million) in the rest of India and ₹76 crore (US$10.79 million) in overseas with a total of ₹237 crore (US$33.66 million) worldwide and became the highest grossing Tamil film of the year to that point. Hindustan Times estimated that it closed with ₹240 crore (US$34.08 million) and was surpassed by Bigil to become the highest-grossing Tamil film of 2019. Times Now estimated that the film closed at ₹250 crore (US$35.5 million) worldwide.

=== Critical response ===
On the review aggregator website Rotten Tomatoes, 71% of 7 critics' reviews are positive, with an average rating of 6/10.

M. Suganth from The Times of India gave 3.5/5 stars and wrote "Petta is less of a Karthik Subbaraj film, but it gives Rajini fans their Thalaivar in a way that they have been dying to see him, celebrating the Rajinisms." Srinivasa Ramanujam of The Hindu stated that "Despite quite a few underwritten characters, Petta triumphs by bringing back the Superstar of yore." Kirubhakar Purushothaman of India Today gave 3.5/5 stars and wrote "Petta is a classic Rajinikanth film that his fans should not miss." Anusha Iyengar from Times Now rated 3.5/5 stars and wrote "Petta is a complete mass entertainer with twists and turns that will make you howl in the theatres like you would in a Thalaiva film."

Shubhra Gupta of The Indian Express gave 3.5/5 stars and wrote "Karthik Subbaraj has a sense of style, which breaks through only occasionally in Petta. For that Rajini Sir will have to submit a little more to the script, and a last little twist in the long drawn-out climax holds out hope. Sify gave 3/5 stars and wrote, "Karthik Subbaraj has packed a pleasing crowd puller that is a satisfying revenge drama with twists and turns." Saibal Chatterjee of NDTV gave 2.5/5 stars and wrote "Rajinikanth returns to the basics with aplomb. Just go and watch it for the Rajinikanth that you missed in his last few releases." Baradwaj Rangan of Film Companion gave 2.5/5 stars and wrote, "Jigarthanda and Iraivi were sprawling stories but there was a sense of a gradual buildup, the sense of the narrative noose being slowly tightened. But Petta looks rushed and even the Karthik Subbaraj flourishes come off like affectations." Gauthaman Baskaran of News18 gave 1/5 and wrote "Petta turns out be yet another outing for Rajinikanth who relies on gimmicks rather than solid performance." Ananda Vikatan rated the film 41 out of 100.

== Dropped sequel ==
In 2026, Rajinikanth said Karthik wanted to do a sequel to Petta with Sethupathi's character returning, but Rajinikanth refused the project due to his scepticism over sequels.
