= Thandikudi =

- village
- Country: India
- State: Tamil Nadu

Languages
  - Official: Tamil
- Time zone: UTC+5:30 (IST)

Thandikudi is a Panchayat in Kodaikanal Circle of Dindigul District in the Indian state of Tamil Nadu. 35 km from Kodaikanal at an altitude of about 3705 feet above sea level in the foothills of the Western Ghats and Palani Hills. Vathalakundu is a forested area.

The name Thandikudi has multiple theories regarding its origin. One theory suggests that the name is derived from the belief of the locals that Lord Muruga, a Hindu deity, jumped from that spot and over the hill to reach Palani. In Tamil, "Thandi" means to jump, and "Kudi" refers to a clan-based settlement. So, according to this theory, Thandikudi would mean "the settlement of the jumping clan."

A theory proposed by the Department of Epigraphy and Archaeology is based on archaeological surveys. It suggests that Thandikudi, located about 47 km northeast of Vattalagundu in the lower Palani hills, was associated with chieftains named "Tondrikon and Kodaiporunan" during the Sangam Age. The present name Thandikudi is believed to have evolved from Tandrikudi.

Archaeological remains found in the area support the notion that Thandikudi has been inhabited for over 3,500 years. The archaeological vestiges indicate that the sites are situated in an ecologically favorable environment, which facilitated continuous occupation throughout the centuries.

To sum it up, the name Thandikudi is thought to have originated from either the belief that Lord Muruga jumped from the spot or the association with chieftains named Tondrikon and Kodaiporunan during the Sangam Age.

== People ==
As per India 2001 census 4058 people live here. 51% of them are male and 49% are female. The average literacy rate of Thandikudi population is 74%, of which male literacy is 80% and female literacy is 67%. This is higher than the Indian national average literacy rate of 59.5%. 9% of the population of Thandikudi is below six years of age.

== Major crop ==
Cash crops like coffee, banana, jackfruit, pepper, and garlic, radish, carrot, beetroot, potato and orange are grown in abundance in this mountain village.
