= Akash Vaani =

Indian television series

- Promotional poster
- Genre: Romance comedy
- Directed by: Enoc Able
- Starring: Kavin; Reba Monica John; Sharath Ravi; Deepak Paramesh; Vinsa Sam; Livingston
- Composer: Guna Balasubramanian
- Country of origin: India
- Original language: Tamil
- No. of seasons: 1
- No. of episodes: 7

Production
- Cinematography: Santhakumar C
- Camera setup: Multi-camera
- Running time: 30 minutes
- Production company: Kaustubha Media Works

Original release
- Network: Aha
- Release: 11 February 2022

Akash Vaani (transl. Sky Voice) is an Indian Tamil-language romance comedy television series produced under the banner of Kaustubha Media Works and premiered on Aha on 11 February 2022. The series features Kavin, Reba Monica John, Sharath Ravi, Deepak Paramesh, Vinsa Sam and Livingston.

== Cast ==
- Kavin as Akash
- Reba Monica John as Vaani
- Sharath Ravi as Dhanasekhar
- Deepak Paramesh as Dilip
- Vinsu Rachel Sam as Teena
- Livingston as Inbaraj
- Deeparaja as Kamesh
- Abhita Venkataraman as Anu

== Production ==
The series was announced by Kaustubha Media Works for Aha consisting of seven episodes. Kavin, Reba John, Sharath Ravi, Deepak Paramesh, Vinsa Sam and Livingston joined the cast. The principal photography of the series started in August 2021 and was wrapped in October 2021. The trailer of the series was released on 7 February 2022.

== Reception ==
Priyanka Sundar of Cinema Express rated the series 1.5/5 stars. Thinkal Menon of OTTPlay rated the series 2/5 stars.
