= Mercury (film) =

2018 film by Karthik Subbaraj

- Theatrical release poster
- Directed by: Karthik Subbaraj
- Written by: Karthik Subbaraj
- Produced by: Kaarthekeyen Santhanam; Jayantilal Gada
- Starring: Prabhu Deva; Sananth; Deepak Paramesh; Shashank Purushotham; Anish Padmanabhan; Indhuja Ravichandran
- Cinematography: Tirru
- Edited by: Vivek Harshan
- Music by: Mithoon; Santhosh Narayanan
- Production companies: Pen Studios; Stone Bench Creations
- Distributed by: Pen India Limited; Paramvah Studios; Pushkar Films
- Release dates: 13 April 2018 (Worldwide); 20 April 2018 (Tamil Nadu)
- Running time: 109 minutes
- Country: India

Mercury is a 2018 Indian horror thriller film written and directed by Karthik Subbaraj. The film, which has no dialogue, stars an ensemble cast that includes Prabhu Deva, Sananth, Deepak Paramesh, Shashank Purushotham, Anish Padmanabhan and Indhuja Ravichandran. Karthik presented the film under his own production banner Stone Bench Creations, whilst Jayantilal Gada of Pen Studios co-produced the film. The plot is about five friends who are terrorised by the ghost of a victim of mercury poisoning.

Mercury is a fictional story that was inspired by the 2001 Kodaikanal mercury poisoning. Filming was done in secrecy, and the film was officially announced only in June 2017 after filming had ended. It was shot in Chennai, Pondicherry, and Kumbakonam. The background music was composed by Santhosh Narayanan, cinematography was handled by Tirru, and the film was edited by Vivek Harshan.

Mercury was released on 13 April 2018 worldwide except for Tamil Nadu, where due to a strike by the Tamil Film Producers Council, it was released in the state on 20 April 2018, becoming the first Tamil cinema release after the strike. Since the film has no dialogue, the makers found distributing and releasing in major territories across India easy. The film received mixed reviews from critics.

== Plot ==
Five long-term friends, who are suffering from mercury poisoning, meet at a farm for a high-school reunion. Michael plans to propose to Meera, and calls her and his friends, and they go on a night-time drive. At their destination, Michael proposes to Meera and she accepts. Afterwards, while driving her four friends home, Meera is temporarily blinded and nearly runs over a dog because the four friends have been interfering with the car's headlights. Somehow, the friends have accidentally dragged a blind man to his death when they swerved to avoid his dog. After dumping the blind man's body, the friends are terrorised by his ghost. The ghost kills the men in the group and tries to kill Meera as well. Meera reveals she is deaf and did not realise the car had hit someone. The ghost realises that he has killed innocent people, thinking they were the owners of a factory who are responsible for the mercury poisoning. The ghost shares his story of being blinded due to mercury poisoning: one night, he was walking his dog when the leash accidentally got stuck to the friends' car and the blind man was dragged along with it until he hit a headstone and died. Despite his accidental death, the ghost forgives Meera and spares her, after possessing her to see his wife one last time. Upon leaving her body, the ghost gives his hearing capacity to Meera and burns down the factory.

== Cast ==
- Prabhu Deva as the blind man
- Sananth as Michael
- Deepak Paramesh
- Shashank Purushotham
- Anish Padmanabhan as Vinay
- Indhuja Ravichandran as Meera
- Gajaraj
- Remya Nambeesan as the blind man's wife (cameo appearance)

Special appearances in The Mercury Song

- Krithika Babu
- Adithya Shivpink

== Production ==
=== Development ===
Karthik Subbaraj wanted to develop a full-length, dialogue-less feature film after his earlier short film Black and White, which is largely devoid of dialogue. Before the release of his feature directorial debut Pizza (2012), Karthik, an admirer of the silent films of Charlie Chaplin and the dialogue-less film Pushpaka Vimana (1987), had this desire, but found difficulty conceiving a story concept. After completing some feature films, Karthik developed a fictional story set against the backdrop of the 2001 Kodaikanal mercury poisoning incident, in which hundreds of workers were allegedly exposed to toxic mercury vapours at the now-defunct Hindustan Lever factory in Kodaikanal, Tamil Nadu; the incident also inspired the title Mercury. Karthik stated the film also explores exploitation of small towns by corporations. He said the absence of dialogue gave him more freedom to emphasise the film's other aspects, such as music, to increase its "thrill factor". Mercury was produced by Kaarthekeyen Santhanam of Stone Bench Creations and Jayantilal Gada of Pen Studios. Cinematography was handled by Tirru, the film was edited by Vivek Harshan, and stunts were choreographed by the twin brothers Anbariv.

=== Casting ===
Prabhu Deva called his role in Mercury unique and unusual compared with his previous films, where the script demanded a dance or comedy sequence. The other cast members Sananth, Deepak Paramesh, Indhuja Ravichandran, and Anish Padmanabhan had appeared in Karthik's earlier films. Shashank Purushotham, a Bengaluru-based theatre actor, made his Tamil cinema debut. The actors began rehearsing for their roles 20–25 days before production began. Remya Nambeesan joined the cast near the end of filming. The cast also took training in Indian Sign Language for their roles.

=== Filming ===
By early June 2017, the makers had completed shooting 60% of the film, mostly at locations in Chennai, Pondicherry, and Kumbakonam. The film, which was being shot secretly, was only officially announced later that month, after filming had ended. Most of the filming was done indoors, and Tirru chose not to keep the camera steady to avoid "visual fatigue" for audiences. Instead, the camera "floats everywhere", either from the characters' points of view or that of a third person. The team also filmed a long take because filming multiple takes would require them to keep moving the cameras. Tirru said: "The situation too warranted it as cutting it into different shots wouldn't convey the intensity of the scene. The idea was to make the audience understand the characters' stand and make them feel claustrophobic."

== Music ==
Santhosh Narayanan, Karthik's regular composer, composed the background music for Mercury. Though the film does not feature any songs, a promotional song titled "The Mercury Song" was composed by Mithoon; lyrics were by Sayeed Quadri, and sung by Haricharan and Gajendra Verma, and the song was released on 15 March 2018. Santhosh composed another promotional song called "Oru Mara Nizhalil", which was recorded by Sathyaprakash Dharmar and lyrics were written by Vivek. "Oru Mara Nizhalil", which was released on 19 April 2018, is a montage song that is picturised on the romance between the characters Michael (Sananth) and Meera (Indhuja).

== Release ==
Karthik initially tweeted Mercury would be scheduled for theatrical release on 13 April 2018, which was Friday the 13th. The film's theatrical trailer was launched on 7 March 2018 and drew a positive response from viewers and audiences. Because Mercury has no dialogue, the producers found distributing and releasing the film in different regions under the same title was easy.

Rakshit Shetty's Paramvah Studios and Pushkar Films distributed Mercury in Karnataka, and KFC Entertainment acquired the rights to release the film in Andhra Pradesh and Telangana. Pen India Limited acquired the film's global rights. The trailer of Mercury was scheduled for release on 5 April but to show solidarity with the statewide bandh due to the Kaveri River water dispute, the makers postponed the trailer launch, although it was launched on 10 April by prominent celebrities.

Mercury was released worldwide on 13 April 2018, excluding Tamil Nadu, where a strike was organised by the Tamil Film Producers Council against the digital service providers because of an increase in the Virtual Print Fee. A day before the film's official release date in India, Mercury was screened at the Indian Film Festival of Los Angeles. The same day, the makers hosted a special screening in Mumbai.

Mercury was leaked online through pirate sites, despite not having a scheduled release in Tamil Nadu. Prabhu Deva and the film's cast urged fans not to watch pirated versions. Mercury became the first Tamil cinema release after the 48-day strike held by Producer's Council. The film opened to a wide release in Tamil Nadu on 20 April 2018.

== Critical reception ==
Mercury received mixed reviews from critics. On the review aggregator website Rotten Tomatoes, 67% of 12 critics' reviews are positive, with an average rating of 6.2/10.

The Times of India's chief critic Reza Noorani gave Mercury three stars out of five, saying: "There are no big scares that Mercury delivers. Instead, it unravels at its own pace which is not perfect at all times." Saibal Chatterjee of NDTV, stated the film is "a disjointed drama that uses conventions of the slasher flick and the horror film in order to spin a none-too-scary yarn that oftentimes borders on the unintentionally funny"; Chatterjee also stated: "the film ventures into the territory that A Quiet Place occupies – the destructive force in Mercury turns out to be a figure that waits for the stimuli of sound to line up and pounce on its targets". Y. Sunita Chowdary of The Hindu stated the film has its fair share of "chills" and "thrills". Udita Jhunjhunwala of Firstpost noted the story as one of the film's major flaws, stating: "the story just does not stitch together".

Anisha Javeri of IndieWire said, "Though the historical backdrop could have made for a compelling metaphor, the clichés and heavy-handedness of Mercury ultimately outweigh the novelty of its premise, while its sloppy social relevance angle does more to confound than clarify the disaster in question". She added that it "may be remembered as the first silent thriller in Indian cinema, but it's far from the heart-stopper we're looking for". Manoj Kumar R. of The Indian Express gave three-and-a-half stars out of five, stating: "Karthik Subbaraj's plot has a few gaps and he also uses the regular narrative techniques of the horror genre to create the moments of shock. However, the overall impact of Mercury on a viewer is very effective, encouraging us to brush aside the shortcomings." Sajin Srijith of The New Indian Express gave a rating of four out of five and said: "Karthik Subbaraj's Mercury is audacious, technically-impressive, and an experiment filled with delightful surprises".

Nandini Ramnath of Scroll.in wrote: "Subbaraj tries to dress up a routine horror film with a social theme, but fortunately, the director has enough tricks up his sleeve to make the scary portions work". Arnab Bannerjee of Deccan Chronicle gave Mercury one-and-a-half five stars and stated: "Karthik Subbaraj tries to juggle a thriller horror story with a not-so-original twist". According to Baradwaj Rangan of Film Companion, Karthik made both a thriller and an "emotional horror-drama with a touch of eco-activism". Sowmya Rajendran of The News Minute stated: "The film breaks out of the formula horror film and attempts something new although the characters don't stand out".
