= Iraivi =

2016 Indian film by Karthik Subbaraj

- Theatrical release poster
- Directed by: Karthik Subbaraj
- Written by: Karthik Subbaraj
- Produced by: C. V. Kumar; K. E. Gnanavel Raja; Abinesh Elangovan
- Starring: S. J. Suryah; Vijay Sethupathi; Bobby Simha; Anjali; Kamalinee Mukherjee; Pooja Devariya
- Cinematography: Sivakumar Vijayan
- Edited by: Vivek Harshan
- Music by: Santhosh Narayanan
- Production companies: Thirukumaran Entertainment; Studio Green; Abi & Abi Pictures
- Release date: 3 June 2016
- Running time: 158 minutes
- Country: India
- Language: Tamil

Iraivi (transl. Goddess) is a 2016 Indian Tamil-language crime drama film written and directed by Karthik Subbaraj and produced by C. V. Kumar, K. E. Gnanavel Raja and Abinesh Elangovan under their banners Thirukumaran Entertainment, Studio Green and Abi & Abi Pictures, respectively. The film features an ensemble cast including S. J. Suryah, Vijay Sethupathi, Bobby Simha, Anjali, Kamalinee Mukherjee and Pooja Devariya. It revolves around three financially struggling men trying to overcome their problems through criminal activities, regardless of the impact their actions are having on the women in their lives.

Karthik drafted the script during the production works of Jigarthanda in September 2013 and took more than a year for its completion. The film was formally announced in February 2015, with principal photography beginning that May and ending in September, having taken place primarily in Chennai and Wayanad. The film features music composed by Santhosh Narayanan with cinematography handled by Sivakumar Vijayan and edited by Vivek Harshan.

Iraivi was released on 3 June 2016 and received positive reviews from critics but did not perform well at the box office. In 2017, Anjali was nominated for the Best Actress award at the 2nd IIFA Utsavam awards, and Pooja received a nomination for Best Supporting Actress award at the 6th South Indian International Movie Awards.

== Plot ==
Arul was a renowned film director until he fell out with Murugesan, the producer of his latest directorial film, because of which the film remains unreleased. Depressed, he became an alcoholic. His wife Yazhini is fed up with his alcoholism and begs him to change his ways as she can not continue tolerating him.

Michael, an artefact dealer in Chennai, is forced to marry Ponni, despite being in love with Malarvizhi "Malar", a widow. However, Malar has no love for Michael, merely considering their relationship as friends with benefits. Michael openly tells Ponni that he is not interested in being her husband and ignores her.

Yazhini tries to convince Arul to seek Murugesan's forgiveness and get his film released so that they both could return to a normal life. Murugesan initially insults Arul but later gives in, offering to sell him the rights for 5 crores. Arul's younger brother proposes a plan to smuggle and sell the God idols carved by their father. However, Murugesan announces that he's remaking Arul's film with his brother, stating Arul was incapable of making a good film. Arul goes to Murugesan's office to seek justice, but he threatens to kill him.

Michael, still hung up on Malar, visits her to ask for one last chance, but she tells him she never loved him and lies that she already moved on. Michael comes home to Ponni with a changed heart and she reveals she's pregnant. Yazhini calls him to tell him that Arul has thrown a drunken fit and left the house. Michael and Jagan arrive just in time to save Arul. In the heat of the moment, Michael bludgeons Murugesan to death, and is sentenced to 7 years in prison.

Ponni gives birth to a girl and refuses to visit Michael. He is released in bail 2 years later and hears that Ponni left the house unannounced with their child. He tracks hold of her, and she agrees to reunite, only if he cuts ties with Arul's family. Meanwhile, Arul had spent two years in rehab, and goes to bring Yazhini back to his house. Yazhini tells him its too late and to finish divorce proceedings. Her parents look for another groom.

Murugesan's widow and brother meet with Arul and offer to sell the film's production rights to him as per their offer due to debts. To raise funds, Michael, Jagan and Ramesh steal an idol from a Kerala temple. However, Ramesh drugs Michael and escapes with the idol. Michael is arrested the following morning but escapes from the police and returns to Chennai.

Michael confronts Ramesh, who reveals that Jagan was responsible for getting him arrested. Jagan also loved Ponni and was disgusted by how Michael treated her. When Michael was in jail, Jagan declared his love for Ponni. She had told him she'd give it a thought but went AWOL the day after. He had orchestrated the plot so Michael is arrested and stays away from Ponni.

Michael confronts Ponni about it, she tells him she did reciprocate Jagan's love but it'd be her fate to live with Michael regardless. They decide to move away from the town and start anew. Yazhini also decides to forgive Arul, if he promises to never relapse.

Michael privately meets Arul and asks for 10 lakhs so he can start a business, Arul asks him to meet his father and get the amount. Michael tries to leave covertly after receiving the money, but a drunk Jagan triggers him. Michael loses his cool again and bludgeons him to death. John agrees to cover up, but later brings Arul to Michael to the train station, saying Arul would forgive him if he were to come clean.

Arul shoots Michael to death. John asks a shaken Ponni to leave, saying she'd never find peace with them. Arul makes one last call to Yazhini. He fakes a relapse and slut-shames her, in an attempt to give her a closure and let her move on. Initially shaken by these events, Yazhini and Ponni relish their new-found freedom in their own ways.

== Cast ==
- S. J. Suryah as Arul Dass
- Vijay Sethupathi as Michael
- Bobby Simha as Jagan
- Vaibhav as Vasanth (special appearance)
- Anjali as Ponni
- Kamalinee Mukherjee as Yazhini "Yazhu"
- Pooja Devariya as Malarvizhi "Malar"
- Radha Ravi as Dass
- Karunakaran as Ramesh
- Cheenu Mohan as John
- R. K. Vijay Murugan as Murugesan
- Gajaraj as Ramalingam
- Kaali Venkat as Bhagyam
- Bagavathi Perumal as Varun
- Vadivukkarasi as Meenakshi
- Rajashree as Kala
- Ramachandran Durairaj as Mahesh
- Senthil Kumaran as Senthil
- Settai Sethu as Bala
- Kasthuri Patti as Sagayam
- Uma as Murugesan's wife
- Rameez Raja as Rakesh
- Vivek Prasanna as Director
- Santhosh Narayanan (special appearance in the song "Kadhal Kappal")

== Production ==
=== Development ===
While working on Jigarthanda (2014), Karthik Subbaraj began writing for his untitled third project in September 2013. A year later, in September 2014, it was reported that the film would be titled Iraivi and produced by C. V. Kumar via Thirukumaran Entertainment, collaborating with Karthik for the second time after Pizza (2012). The producers officially confirmed the project in February 2015, with cinematographer Gavemic U. Ary, editor Vivek Harshan, composer Santhosh Narayanan, art director R. K. Vijay Murugan and sound designer duo Vishnu Govind and Sree Sankar forming the technical crew. Ary was later replaced by Sivakumar Vijayan.

Karthik stated that the film would focus on how women influence men in modern society. Speaking to Vishal Menon of The Hindu, he stated that the films of directors K. Balachander, Balu Mahendra and Mahendran, who often made women-centric films, inspired him to do the film. He said the film was neither "preachy" nor about women's empowerment, but "based on the women we see around us and how certain things are no different, no matter what class or background they belong to". In a 2025 interview with The Hollywood Reporter India, Karthik said the film was partly autobiographical.

=== Casting ===
In February 2015, Karthik released a press statement confirming the casting of Bobby Simha, Vijay Sethupathi and S. J. Suryah as the lead actors, with Karunakaran in a major role. Karthik described Iraivi as a performance-driven film, where "good actors can make a huge difference to a scene that might sound or read flat". Speaking of Suryah's casting, Karthik stated he had liked Suryah's acting and directorial prowess, but did not want a repeat of the actor's performances in New (2004) and Anbe Aaruyire (2005). Simha rejected the notion that his character was negative, calling him a "loyal guy" who "never understands why his friends treat women the way they do.

In May 2015, Anjali was announced as playing one of the lead actresses; Pooja Kumar had reportedly been considered for the role. Kamalinee Mukherjee was confirmed the following month, marking a return to Tamil films after Kadhalna Summa Illai (2009). Pooja Devariya had auditioned twice for the film, but shifted to Mumbai for her theatre career after receiving no response from the makers of Iraivi; however, Karthik's management contacted her a few days after, and she joined the film. Karthik decided to cast Cheenu Mohan after being impressed with his performance in Thalapathi (1991). Mohan, who had been inactive as an actor for years, agreed to Karthik's request to act in the film, making a comeback. Vijay Murugan, besides serving as art director, also portrays the antagonistic role of a film producer.

=== Filming ===
Karthik stated that the film would begin production from April 2015. However, principal photography eventually began a month later, on 20 May. Scenes featuring Simha and Suryah were first shot during this schedule. By early-September, filming was mostly complete, having taken place primarily in Chennai and Wayanad. Anjali completed shooting her portions in mid-September 2015. Filming wrapped by 30 September, after which post-production works commenced. Dubbing works began in November 2015. In June 2020, almost four years after the film's release, the makers released raw footage of the climax sequence performed by Suryah. According to Karthik, some people suggested he give the film a happy ending, but he found that "tough".

== Soundtrack ==
The soundtrack album is composed by Santhosh Narayanan and featured six songs written by Vivek, Muthamil and Mani Amudhavan. The album was released on 15 April 2016 under the Sony Music India label.

== Marketing ==
In early January 2016, the first look poster was released, and the caption "Sila woMENkalin kadhai" (Story of few woMEN) was highlighted by commentators for the way it capitalised the word "men". As a part of the promotional campaign, the filmmakers premiered a four-episode series, documenting the film's making, starting from 22 May 2016. They also collaborated with The Sight Media to launch an in-auto rickshaw LED branding, with the clips and video promos of the film being available for customers travelling in Chennai auto rickshaws through the LED panels installed there.

== Release ==
=== Theatrical ===
Iraivi was initially scheduled for release on 20 May 2016. Due to the release of Idhu Namma Aalu and Marudhu during the month, the team pushed the release to 3 June. In Tamil Nadu, the film was distributed by KR Films in association with Skylark Entertainment and Area 78.

=== Home media ===
The film had its television premiere on 5 September 2016 via Jaya TV.

== Critical reception ==
Iraivi received positive response from critics. M. Suganth of The Times of India gave 3.5 out of 5 and stated, "Karthik's writing is novelistic, with each character having their own well-sketched arcs." In his review for The Hindu, Baradwaj Rangan wrote, "Iraivi is an unusual feminist film, in the sense that it's seen entirely through the prism of sympathetic male characters. This is bound to happen when there are so many people, so many strands, when we don't follow one person's simplistic "you go, girl" journey. But when the parts are so well-crafted, we don't complain as much about their sum not adding up to a satisfying whole." Gauthaman Baskaran of Hindustan Times wrote, "Iraivi in the end seems like a story gone astray, the lives of several people destroyed by male egoistic rage that seeks solution in blood and gore. There is very little to cheer in the 160-minute work, which, though has some interesting performances by Simha, Surya and Anjali." Kirubakar Purushothaman of India Today gave 3 out of 5 and stated, "The story of Iraivi is about the victimisation of the females in the film by the malevolent arrogance of their respective not-so-better halves." J Hurtado of ScreenAnarchy wrote, "Not straight enough to be a great drama, and not out-there enough to be another quirky winner, Iraivi falls flat".

S. Saraswathi of Rediff.com gave 3.5 out of 5 to the film, stating, "The beautifully etched out characters, the performances, the exceptional music and the thought-provoking message makes Karthik Subbaraj's Iraivi a must watch." Giving 3 out of 5 stars, Anupama Subramanian of Deccan Chronicle wrote, "The movie has a feminist theme and the bold characters have semblance to one we used to see in K. Balachander's films." Vikram Venkateshwaran of The Quint wrote, "Iraivi disturbingly tells you that gender is not based on one's plumbing. All of the characters, including the women who are victimised, only seek happiness for themselves. And that's what makes it so real and relatable." Sowmya Rajendran of The News Minute wrote that the director "does suggest that women ought to stop depending on men for their happiness but sadly, even then, none of his female characters MAKE that choice actively. The men do it on their behalf. The women are like characters from Waiting for Godot, hoping that someday, things will get better without taking charge of their own lives. This is a very simplistic depiction and does injustice to both genders. It is also unreal though we may be tricked into believing that it is completely realistic."

== Controversies ==
Post-release, some members of the Tamil Film Producers Council including P. L. Thenappan criticised Karthik for allegedly portraying the producer's character in poor light and also threatened to issue a "red card" against the director. K. E. Gnanavel Raja, who co-produced and distributed the film also expressed his disappointment against the issue. He noted that Karthik had differences of opinion with C. V. Kumar because the former overshot the budget. Some reports claimed that Karthik's fallout with film producer Kathiresan during the production of Jigarthanda is why he portrayed the Iraivi character as such. After Karthik issued a letter to the Tamil Film Directors Union explaining his position, the problem was amicably resolved. Vijay Murugan said he received calls from producers only having praise for his performance, and noted that people had blown a small matter out of proportion.

== Impact ==
Inspired by the film, a clothes showroom named Iraivi was organised by Vijay Sethupathi's sister in Chennai.
