= Sowmya Rajendran =

Indian writer

- Born: 1985 or 1986 (age 40–41)
- Education: University of Sussex, United Kingdom
- Writing career
- Language: English
- Genres: young adult fiction, picture books, inspirational
- Notable work: Mayil Will Not Be Quiet

Sowmya Rajendran is an Indian writer. She is the winner of Sahitya Akademi's 2015 Bal Sahitya Puraskar and has written over 20 books. She has written young adult fiction, picture books and inspirational books for children.

== Career ==
Rajendran's writing challenges, among other diverse issues, the stereotypical notions of beauty. Her book, The Pleasant Rakshasha, recounts the tale of Karimuga, a demon who is both pleasant and beautiful. The Boy Who Asked Why depicts the story of a young B. R. Ambedkar while Wings to Fly depicts para-athlete Malathi Holla. The Lesson, released on International Women's Day 2015, began as a blogpost and sarcastically discusses gender-based violence, discrimination and the institution of marriage. The Weightlifting Princess (2019) depicts a princess who is passionate about weightlifting. Suddenly Cow is a funny story about a cow that appears suddenly.

Mayil Will Not Be Quiet has its 12-year-old protagonist, Mayil Ganesan, explore some issues like gender stereotyping and is written in the diary format. This book went on to win her the 2015 Bal Sahitya Puraskar awarded by the Sahitya Akademi. The book was published in 2011 and was written in collaboration with Niveditha Subramaniam. The book has two sequels, Mostly Madly Mayil (2013) and This is Me, Mayil (2019). Mayil, the protagonist of the series, lives in Chennai and opines about the events that happen around her, including gender discrimination, domestic violence, identity politics, sexual harassment and caste conflict.

Girls to the Rescue is an alternate retelling of conventional fairy tales. In this version of The Frog Prince, the princess chooses to not marry the frog chosen as her spouse by her family. This story was chosen for the Indian Certificate of Secondary Education Class VI textbook. Further, this book's version of Cinderella has the largest feet in the kingdom and does not immediately agree to prince's marriage proposal and instead invites him for dinner. Rajendran's first book was The Underwater Friends, which was later published as a series of picture books. It was written while she was still pursuing her master's degree in Gender Studies.

== Personal life ==
Rajendran is based in Pashan, Pune District. She has a masters in Gender studies from the University of Sussex, United Kingdom. She has a daughter, born in 2011, named Adhira. As a child, Rajendran enjoyed reading Enid Blyton, Alfred Hitchcock, Premchand, RK Narayan, Agatha Christie and children's magazines like Tinkle, Chandamama, Gokulam and Champak.

== Works ==
- The Underwater Friends
- The Pleasant Rakshasha
- The Boy Who Asked Why
- Wings to Fly
- Girls to the Rescue
- Suddenly Cow
- Mayil Will Not Be Quiet (2011)
- Mostly Madly Mayil (2013)
- This is Me, Mayil (2019)
- The Lesson (2015)
- The Weightlifting Princess (2019)

== See also ==
- Hindi literature
- List of Hindi-language authors
