= Meyaadha Maan (soundtrack) =

2017 soundtrack album by Santhosh Narayanan and Pradeep Kumar

- Soundtrack album cover

Soundtrack album by Santhosh Narayanan and Pradeep Kumar
- Released: 27 September 2017
- Recorded: 2017
- Genre: Feature film soundtrack
- Length: 28:09
- Language: Tamil
- Label: Think Music
- Producer: Santhosh Narayanan; Pradeep Kumar

Santhosh Narayanan chronology
Server Sundaram (2017)	Meyaadha Maan (2017)	Mercury (2018)

Pradeep Kumar chronology
Maine Pyar Kiya (2014)	Meyaadha Maan (2017)	Aadai (2019)

Singles from Meyaadha Maan
- 1. "Thangachi Song" Released: 7 August 2017; 2. "Enna Naan Seiven" Released: 25 August 2017; 3. "Address Song" Released: 13 September 2017

Meyaadha Maan is the soundtrack album jointly composed by Santhosh Narayanan and Pradeep Kumar for the 2017 film of the same name directed by Rathna Kumar. The album had seven tracks written by Vivek, Pradeep Kumar, Rathna Kumar and Mirchi Vijay. Prior to the album release, three songs – "Thangachi Song", "Enna Naan Seiven" and "Address Song" released as singles on 7, 25 August and 13 September, and the full album was unveiled on 27 September 2017, to positive reviews from critics and audience. Post-release, the tracks "Address Song" and "Thangachi Song" gained popularity.

== Production ==
As the lead character runs a light music troupe, Kumar allowed the narrative of the film to be musical saying that it was an "integral part in the film". During his scripting process, Rathna Kumar set the film in North Chennai, as he was inspired by the creative talents of people in Royapuram and he met several lyric writers, singers and percussionists during his visits to the areas. Santhosh Narayanan was announced as the film's composer, due to his regular collaboration with Karthik Subbaraj, the producer of this film, and in this process he was keen to allow his long-time collaborator Pradeep Kumar to also work on the film as a co-composer, and played a role in bringing him into the project.

This film marked the debut of Pradeep as a film composer, who initially worked as a playback singer, mostly for films featuring Santhosh Narayanan. Pradeep contributed two songs for the film, while Santhosh had composed five tracks, and also scored the background music for the film. Besides composing, Pradeep had also penned lyrics for one song, with Rathna Kumar penning two songs and Vivek writing four songs for the soundtrack; radio personality Mirchi Vijay (in his first stint as lyricist) penned one song for this film. All songs in the album consisted of varied genres basically set in North Chennai, the album was considered to be a mix of gaana and melodies.

== Release ==
The "Thangachi Song" is a dance number picturised on Vaibhav and Indhuja Ravichandran who plays the role of the former's sister in the film, which was sung by Anthony Daasan and choreographed by Santhosh. It was released as a single to coincide with the Hindu festival of Raksha Bandhan on 7 August 2017. The song gained popularity among the film audiences, for the catchy tune and quirky lyrics, with The Indian Express stated "the song perfectly captures the naughtiness and love that siblings share". Another single titled "Enna Naan Seiven" sung by Pradeep Kumar and Kalyani Nair released on 25 August 2017, coinciding with Ganesh Chathurthi, which is a melody number. The third single "Address Song" (Adiye S. Madhu) sung by Santhosh Narayanan was released on 13 September 2017. Being one of the typical soup-song genre, (Note: The term 'Soup' is a colloquial Tamil word which refers to young men experiencing depression after love failure in a love relationship. The "Soup-song" genre became popular among the release of "Why This Kolaveri Di", a song from the Dhanush-starrer 3. But it also received criticism from a section of cinephiles for being misogynistic following the aftermath of Swathi murder case, where the alleged and unrealistic portrayal of women and love in Tamil cinema being one of the factors for violence against women.) Rathna Kumar wanted this song to end the entire genre of bar songs that lambaste women. The album which was marketed by Think Music was released at a promotional launch event held at Loyola College in Chennai on 27 September 2017, with the film's cast and crew and other celebrities in attendance, and also featured a musical performance by Santhosh, Pradeep and his team.

== Track listing ==
The official track list was released by Think Music on 23 September 2017 ahead of the music launch.

Track list
No.	Title	Lyrics	Music	Singer(s)	Length
1.	"Thangachi Song"	Vivek	Santhosh Narayanan	Anthony Daasan	3:50
2.	"Enna Naan Seiven"	Pradeep Kumar	Pradeep Kumar	Pradeep Kumar, Kalyani Nair	5:12
3.	"Address Song"	Rathna Kumar, Vivek	Santhosh Narayanan	Santhosh Narayanan, Chinna	4:43
4.	"Rathina Katti"	Vivek	Santhosh Narayanan	Dhee	4:16
5.	"Nee Mattum Pothum"	Mirchi Vijay	Pradeep Kumar	Sid Sriram, Darshana KT	4:21
6.	"Megamo Aval"	Vivek	Santhosh Narayanan	Pradeep Kumar, Ananthu	4:34
7.	"Enga Veetu Kuthuvilakkey (Area Gaana)"	Rathna Kumar	Santhosh Narayanan	Ka Ka Bala	6:09
Total length:					28:09

== Reception ==
M. Suganth in his review for The Times of India praised the film's cinematography and music (the background score and the songs) adding that "it gave us a taste of North Madras life in the region". In the review for Hindustan Times, Siddharth Srinivas stated that Santhosh and Pradeep "stack up a catchy mix of melodies and kuthu songs for the album", further adding that "the album offers a wondrous mix of variety, dipped in eclectic, exciting tunes that should hit the marquee". Karthik Srinivasan of Milliblog wrote "The Santhosh-Pradeep combo wins again". Avinash Ramachandran of Cinema Express reviewed the album as a "mix of gaana, western music and melodies in good proportions which would be a delight for music lovers". Vipin Nair of Music Aloud gave the album 3.5 out of 5 saying "Santosh Narayanan and Pradeep Kumar deliver a classy set of melodies for Meyaadha Maan" and "it work much better than Santosh Narayanan's quirky tracks".

== Charts ==
Chart (2017)	Song	Position	Ref.
Mirchi Top 100	"Thangachi Song"	7	
Mirchi Top 100	"Address Song"	13	
Mirchi Top 100	"Area Gaana"	16	
Mirchi Top 100	"Megamo Aval"	29	
The Times of India	"Address Song"	10	
Music Aloud	"Megamo Aval"	12	

== Personnel ==
Credits adapted from Think Music

- Santhosh Narayanan – Composer (Track 1,3,4,6,7), arranger (Track 1,3,4,6,7), producer (Track 1,3,4,6,7), backing vocalist (Track 1), piano (Track 4), sound engineer (Future Tense Studios, Chennai) [Track 1,3,4,6,7], audio mixing (Track 1,3,4,6,7)
- Pradeep Kumar – Composer (Track 2,5), arranger (Track 2,5), producer (Track 2,5), backing vocalist (Track 5), acoustic guitar (Track 2,5), bass guitar (Track 5)
- Kalyani Nair – Backing vocalist (Track 1,5)
- Chinna – Chorus (Track 3)
- Britto – Chorus (Track 3,7)
- Yogi Sekar – Chorus (Track 3,7)
- Ramanathan – Chorus (Track 7)
- Vinod – Chorus (Track 7)
- 4 Idiots – Percussions (Track 1,3)
- Naveen – Bass (Track 1,3,6)
- Jhanu Chantar – Bass (Track 2), electric guitar (Track 5)
- Tapass Naresh – Drums (Track 2,5)
- Ramamoorthy KT – Piano (Track 3)
- Studio Orchestra of Sydney – Collins Rajendran (Track 4)
- Phil Hartl – Solo violin (Track 4)
- Bharath Shankar – Keys (Track 5)
- Ramkumar Kanagarajan – Percussions (Track 5)
- Fame's Macedonian Symphonic Orchestra (Track 6)
- Oleg Kondratenko – Orchestra conductor (Track 6)
- Andrew T. Mackay – India orchestra co-ordination (Track 6)
- Venkat – Dholak (Track 7)
- Ganapathy – Dholak (Track 7)
- Manikandan Murali – Additional arrangements (Track 7)
- RK Sundar – Sound engineer (Future Tense Studios, Chennai) [Track 1,3,4,6,7], additional rhythms (Track 1,3,7)
- Dinesh Anthony – Sound engineer (Prism Studios, Chennai) [Track 1,3,4,6,7]
- Vishnu Namboodhiri – Sound engineer (Krimson Avenue Studios, Chennai) [Track 2,5]
- Christian Wright – Sound engineer (Studio 301, Sydney) [Track 1,3,4,6,7], audio mastering (Track 1,3,4,6,7)
- Rahul Ramachandran – Audio mixing (Track 2,5)
- Shadab Rayeen – Audio mastering (Track 2)
- Stuart Bruce – Audio mastering (Track 5)
- Meenakshi Santhosh – Music co-ordination
