= Charukesh Sekar =

Indian film director

- Born: India
- Occupations: Film director, Screenwriter
- Years active: 2015–present

Charukesh Sekar is an Indian film director and screenwriter who has directed Tamil-language films and web series. He made his directorial debut with the anthology film Bench Talkies and went on to direct the web series Triples (2020) and the Telugu film Ammu.

== Career ==
Charukesh Sekar made his directorial debut through the Tamil anthology film Bench Talkies (2015), which featured a collection of short films by different filmmakers. His segment was noted for its realistic storytelling and character-driven narrative.

He later made for directing the Tamil web series Triples (2020), produced by Karthik Subbaraj for Disney+ Hotstar. Starring Jai Sampath, Vani Bhojan, and Vivek Prasanna The series received positive responses for its light-hearted tone and vibrant direction.

In 2022, Charukesh directed the Telugu film Ammu, produced by Kalyan Subramanian and Karthik Subbaraj under Stone Bench Films for Amazon Prime Video. Starring Aishwarya Lekshmi, Naveen Chandra, and Bobby Simha, the film explored domestic abuse and female empowerment.

== Filmography ==
Year	Title	Language	Notes
2015	Bench Talkies	Tamil	Segment: "Puzhu"
2020	Triples	Tamil	
2022	Ammu	Telugu	
