= Stone Bench Creations =

Indian film production company

- Type: Private company
- Industry: Entertainment; Motion picture
- Founded: 28 January 2015; 11 years ago
- Headquarters: Chennai, Tamil Nadu, India
- Area served: Worldwide
- Key people: Karthik Subbaraj (founder); Kaarthekeyen Santhanam; Kalyan Subramanian
- Products: Film production; Film distribution
- Subsidiaries: Stone Bench Films; Stone Bench Originals
- Website: stonebench.co.in

Stone Bench Creations is an Indian film production company based in Chennai, India. It was established in 2015 by Indian director Karthik Subbaraj. As of 2023, the company has produced 16 feature films, including productions made in the Tamil and Malayalam film industries. It has collaborated and been produced with filmmakers including Rathna Kumar, Karthik Subbaraj, Ponram, Ashok Veerappan and Malayalam film director Jithin Issac Thomas. The production company made its debut with the film Bench Talkies. Stone Bench also produced more than five original content for the streaming services Netflix, Amazon Prime, ZEE5, Disney+ Hotstar and SonyLIV. Stone Bench also presents other language films in Tamil Nadu, including 777 Charlie.

== History ==
Stone Bench was founded by Indian film director Karthik Subbaraj in 2015. Subbaraj's brother-in-law, Kaarthekeyen Santhanam, works as the main producer for the studio. The company made its debut film production with Bench Talkies in 2015, which it self-distributed. The film stars Vijay Sethupathi, Guru Somasundaram and Sananth Reddy in the lead roles. It is a collection of six short films directed by six different directors. On 25 March 2015, it was released in a limited number of theaters. The film received mixed reviews from critics. A critic of The Times of India gave it 3 out of 5, stating that "the compilation of six films from six filmmakers in different genres makes it an entertaining experience".

After their debut production, the production company announced their second production, Aviyal, which is the second part of Bench Talkies. It was released on 12 February 2016 in theaters, and had a special premiere at the 13th Chennai International Film Festival on 10 January 2016. On 11 March 2016, it was released on over 70 screens in Tamil Nadu, 30 screens in Kerala, and a few screens in the United States.

== Filmography ==
=== Production ===
†	Denotes films that have not yet been released

Year	Film	Language	Actors	Director(s)	Note
2015	Bench Talkies	Tamil	Vijay Sethupathi, Rishinanth Rajendran, Guru Somasundaram	Karthik Subbaraj, Anil Krishnan, Gopakumar, Charukesh Sekar, Monesh, Rathna Kumar	Anthology film, Producer
2016	Aviyal	Tamil	Nivin Pauly, Bobby Simha, Amrutha Srinivasan	Alphonse Puthren, Shameer Sultan, Mohit Mehra, Lokesh Kanagaraj, Guru Smaran	Anthology film, Producer
2017	Meyaadha Maan	Tamil	Vaibhav, Priya Bhavani Shankar	Rathna Kumar	
2018	Mercury	Tamil	Prabhu Deva, Sananth	Karthik Subbaraj	
2019	Petta	Tamil	Rajinikanth, Vijay Sethupathi	Karthik Subbaraj	Executive Producer
2020	Penguin	Tamil	Keerthy Suresh	Eashvar Karthic	
2021	Boomika	Tamil	Aishwarya Rajesh, Vidhu	Rathindran R. Prasad	
2022	Attention Please	Malayalam	Vishnu Govindan, Sreejith Babu, Anand Manmadhan	Jithin Issac Thomas	
2022	Buffoon	Tamil	Vaibhav, Anagha	Ashok Veerappan	
2022	Ammu	Telugu	Aishwarya Lekshmi, Naveen Chandra, Bobby Simha	Charukesh Sekar	
2022	DSP	Tamil	Vijay Sethupathi, Anukreethy Vas	Ponram	
2023	Rekha	Malayalam	Unni Lalu, Vincy Aloshious	Jithin Issac Thomas	
2023	Tentigo	Sinhala	Kaushalya Fernando, Priyantha Sikikumara, Thusitha Laknath, Ranjith Panagoda,	Ilango Ram	Co-production with Silent Frames Productions and Crawling Angel Films
2023	Jigarthanda DoubleX	Tamil	Raghava Lawrence, SJ Suryah	Karthik Subbaraj	
2024	Rathnam	Tamil	Vishal, Priya Bhavani Shankar	Hari	
2025	Perusu	Tamil	Vaibhav, Sunil Reddy, Niharika NM	Ilango Ram	Co-production with Baweja Studios and Ember Light Studio, remake of Tentigo
2025	Retro	Tamil	Suriya, Pooja Hegde	Karthik Subbaraj	Co-produced with 2D Entertainment
2026	Prakambanam	Malayalam	Ganapathi S. Poduval, Sagar Surya, Al Ameen	Vijesh Panathur	Co-production with Navarasa Films
2026	29	Tamil	Vidhu, Preethi Asrani, Mahendran	Rathna Kumar	Co-production with G Squad

=== Distribution ===
Year	Title	Language	Actors	Director(s)	Note
2022	777 Charlie	Tamil (dubbed)	Rakshit Shetty	Kiranraj K	Distribution – Tamil Nadu
2023	Sapta Saagaradaache Ello: Side B	Tamil (dubbed)	Rakshit Shetty	Hemanth M. Rao	Distribution – Tamil Nadu; presenter

=== Streaming originals ===
Year	Title	Actor(s)	Director(s)	Platform	Note
2018	Kallachirippu	Amrutha Srinivasan, Vikas	Rohit Nandakumar	ZEE5	
2020	Triples	Jai, Vani Bhojan	Charukesh Sekar	Disney+ Hotstar	
2020	Putham Pudhu Kaalai	Jayaram, Kalidas Jayaram	Sudha Kongara, Gautham Vasudev Menon, Suhasini Mani Ratnam, Rajiv Menon, Karthik Subbaraj	Amazon Prime	Anthology film (Miracle)
2021	Navarasa	Bobby Simha	Karthik Subbaraj	Netflix	Producer episode : Peace
2022	Kaiyum Kalavum	Sanchana Natarajan, Rohit	Roju	SonyLIV	
2024	Snakes and Ladders	Nandaa	Ashok Veerappan, Bharath Muralidharan, Kamala Alchemis	Amazon Prime Video	
