= Madhu (2014 film) =

2014 short film directed by Rathna Kumar

- Directed by: Rathna Kumar
- Written by: Rathna Kumar
- Produced by: Rathna Kumar
- Starring: Sananth; Roshini Abraham; Vivek Prasanna
- Cinematography: Vijay Kartik Kannan
- Edited by: Sridharan G. K.
- Music by: Javed Riaz
- Production company: Bare Hands Movie Makers
- Release date: 6 June 2014
- Running time: 39 minutes
- Country: India
- Language: Tamil

Madhu is a 2014 Indian Tamil-language romantic comedy short film written, directed and produced by Rathna Kumar, starring Sananth, Roshini Abraham and Vivek Prasanna. The music for the film is composed by Javed Riaz, with cinematography handled by Vijay Kartik Kannan and editing done by Sridharan G. K. It was released through YouTube on 6 June 2014.

The film was included in one of the six short segments for the anthology film Bench Talkies, bankrolled by Karthik Subbaraj's maiden production house Stone Bench Creations. A feature film adaptation based on the short film was developed by Rathna Kumar, owing to Subbaraj's interest and was titled Meyaadha Maan with Vaibhav and Priya Bhavani Shankar in the lead roles. The film released on 18 October 2017 to positive reviews.

== Plot ==
The film revolves around the romance between Kumar (Sananth) and his college mate Madhu (Roshini Abraham). Kumar, who is unable to express his love to Madhu, came to know about that she has engaged. A dejected Kumar tries to commit suicide and to dissuade him, his friend reaches out to the girl, setting in motion events that unexpectedly turn out to be life changing.

== Cast ==
- Sananth as Kumar
- Roshni Abraham as Madhu
- Vivek Prasanna as Vinoth
- Vignesh Vergil as Kishore
- Deepak Paramesh as Amith Krishnan
- Baby Krithiga as Viji

== Production ==
Rathna Kumar penned the 40-page script for the short within 30 minutes and chose actors Sananth Reddy, Roshini Abraham, Vivek Prasanna for the lead. Deepak Paramesh apart from playing a supporting role in the film, had also dubbed for Vignesh Vergil's character, as well as designing the promotional posters for the film. The voice-over for Abraham's character was dubbed by Deepti Nirmal.

The entire short film was completed within limited budget for four days. The cinematographer Vijay Kartik Kannan used a Canon 6D camera for the film's shoot. Post-production activities of the film began after the completion of the shooting, with four days for editing, two weeks for re-recording, two days for visual effects, digital intermediate, color grading and special effects. Abhishek Joseph George worked on the subtitles for the short film. Praveen Kumar edited the promotional teaser and trailer of the film before the release plans, both of them being unveiled on 26 May and 2 June 2014, respectively.

== Release ==
The short film was uploaded to YouTube on 6 June 2014. It opened to positive feedback from audiences and the short film got more than a million views within a month of its release. The film was included in one of the six stories of the anthology film Bench Talkies – The First Bench, produced by Karthik Subbaraj, under his newly formed production house Stone Bench Creations and had a theatrical release on 27 March 2015.

== Reception ==
M. Suganth, editor-in-chief of The Times of India in the review for the anthology film Bench Talkies praised the short and its director saying "Rathna Kumar RM has a light touch and the lines are genuinely hilarious with some of the vibe of Siva Manasula Sakthi, though he makes an ill-advised decision and slaps the tale with an extended bittersweet ending". Baradwaj Rangan in his review for The Hindu wrote "Rathna Kumar throws everything the box office demands: romance; broken-hearted sentiment (the girl, naturally, is engaged to someone else); zingy one-liners that are far funnier than anything you’ve heard from Santhanam recently; much consumption of sarakku; loyal friends who all but come in T-shirts with the legend Nanbenda; and an overlong running time".

S. Saraswathi of Rediff.com called the short as "lighthearted one-sided love story" and a "miniature potboiler".

== Adaptation ==
Karthik Subbaraj assisted Rathna Kumar to develop the short film into a feature-film format as the team of his production studio Stone Bench Creations were reluctant to sign other scripts of the director and Subbaraj believed that its commercial nature could be the reason why it can be adapted into a feature film. Though Rathna Kumar did not have any intentions to adapt the short as he had developed it only for his portfolio, he later obliged to Subbaraj's request. Kumar set the film in North Chennai as he was inspired by the creative talents of people in the Royapuram and Kasimedu.

Kumar initially planned to rope in the cast members of the short, Sananth, Roshini Abraham and Vivek Prasanna, for the film adaptation; but as producers opted against signing a relative newcomer and also Roshini chosen not to become a feature film actress, the makers cast Vaibhav and television actress Priya Bhavani Shankar (in her film debut), with Vivek Prasanna being the only cast member from the short being retained for the film. Santhosh Narayanan and Pradeep Kumar jointly composed the film music, with the latter made his debut as film composer. The film's title Meyaadha Maan was announced in late June 2017 after ninety percent of the shooting being completed, and was released theatrically on the occasion of Diwali, 18 October 2017, to positive reviews from critics and audience.
