= 29 (film) =

Indian film by Rathna Kumar

- Theatrical release poster
- Directed by: Rathna Kumar
- Written by: Rathna Kumar
- Produced by: Karthik Subbaraj; Kaarthekeyen Santhanam; Lokesh Kanagaraj
- Starring: Vidhu; Preethi Asrani
- Cinematography: Madhesh Manickam
- Edited by: R. S. Sathish Kumar
- Music by: Sean Roldan
- Production companies: Stone Bench Creations; G Squad
- Distributed by: White Carpet Films
- Release date: 8 May 2026
- Running time: 137 minutes
- Country: India
- Language: Tamil

29 is a 2026 Indian Tamil-language romantic drama film written and directed by Rathna Kumar, the film stars Vidhu and Preethi Asrani in the lead roles, alongside Mahendran, Avinash, Shenaz Fathima and Prem Kumar in important roles. It was jointly produced Karthik Subbaraj under his Stone Bench Creations headed by Kaarthekeyen Santhanam and Lokesh Kanagaraj under his G Squad banners respectively. This film marks Vidhu's debut in a lead role. 29 was theatrically released on 8 May 2026.

== Plot ==
Sathya is a 29-year-old man who struggles with an identity crisis and lacks a clear direction in life. Unable to settle into a stable career, he moves through various jobs while questioning his purpose and future. As a child, he was brought up by his parents to study agriculture. But because the lake that used to be part of his hometown was removed to build the college from which he later earned his degree. The lack of backbone caused him to have a strained relationship with his mother.

Sathya moves from his hometown in Salem to Chennai and finds a part-time job in an accounting job, where he meets Viji, an ambitious and focused young woman. As the two grow closer, a romantic relationship develops between them. While Viji is determined about her goals on becoming an IAS Officer, Sathya remains uncertain about his own aspirations, regarding his role as Viji's boyfriend as his purpose.

As their relationship progresses, Sathya's indecisiveness begins to create tensions. Viji seeks clarity regarding their future together, but Sathya finds it difficult to commit due to his ongoing personal struggles. Their differing outlooks on life lead to conflicts and emotional distance between them.

At one point, Sathya wanted Viji to meet his parents in person, but it slips her mind as she is focused on her IAS main exams. Hurt by this, Sathya insults Viji. Resulting in the latter unable to sleep and fainting from exhaustion during her exams. setting herself back a year. This causes Viji to breakup with him and move along with her mother to Delhi to pursue IAS coaching, breaking his heart while also making him realize that all she wanted from him was for something to look to beyond their relationship.

After 180 days, Sathya has returned to Salem. And caused problems in the college he used to study in. Upon speaking with a collector, he expresses his desire to return the lake that was taken and preserve the towns agriculture. The collector allows him to adopt another dry lake, telling him that if he can renovate this lake, the college in which his lake stands on will be demolished. Despite facing setbacks from the local MLA and his son (who he has butted heads within the past), he successfully cleans up the lake, allowing the rain to come and restore it. But not before the MLA's son creates a riot, trying him and throwing him in jail with false accusations. In addition to this, Sathya also gets attacked by other inmates and the police officers on his payroll. The news broadcasts all over India, which Viji hears. And she finally cries to her mother, that she can't study anymore thinking about him.

Eventually, Sathya gets released with her mother's help and support from the volunteers who helped him just in time to see what his lake has become. He finally revels in achieving his goal, admitting that, having a goal and trying to reach it makes life all the more colourful. However, Viji's mother then secretly visits Sathya in hospital, telling him about Viji being unable to focus and her mental breakdown.

Sathya then travels to Delhi with his friend, to find Viji. When Viji confronts him, Sathya asks her to wait. An elderly man then shows up to talk to Viji, revealing himself as Viji's long lost father, Kurunila Kathiravan (who she confessed to Sathya about her desire to find him), when Viji finishes speaking to him, Sathya tells her how much her mother has done to raise as her career driven and ambitious woman and motivates her to keep going for her sake.

In a deleted climax scene, Sathya and Viji are shown reuniting after the events of the film. The scene depicts the couple planting a sapling together before eventually tying the knot. During their interaction, Viji playfully questions Sathya about why he took so long to marry her, to which he responds that he had been searching for the perfect place to marry her. Sathya and Viji ultimately reconcile and begin a life together.

== Cast ==
- Vidhu as Sathya
- Preethi Asrani as Vijayalakshmi "Viji"
- Mahendran as Santhosh
- Avinash as Mani
- Shehnaz Fathima as Jaanu
- Sindhu Shyam as Viji's mother
- Aadhira Pandilakshmi as Pandiyalakshmi
- Sa. Sathishkumar as Sathya's friend
- Priyanka Rai as Baby
- Anusrivelan as Collector
- Prem Kumar as Kurunila Kathiravan, Viji's estranged father
- Leona Lishoy as Rukmini

== Production ==
After Gulu Gulu (2022), in early-December 2025, Rathna Kumar was announced to make a comeback as a director, for a film jointly produced by Karthik Subbaraj's Stone Bench Creations headed by Kaarthekeyen Santhanam and Lokesh Kanagaraj's G Squad banners respectively. The fourth directorial venture of Rathna Kumar was titled 29, with Jigarthanda DoubleX (2023) and Retro (2025) fame Vidhu playing the lead role. Preethi Asrani was chosen to play the lead role opposite to Vidhu, alongside Mahendran, Avinash, Shenaz Fathima and Prem Kumar in important roles. After the announcement that was made in December 2025, filming took place swiftly and wrapped on 29 January 2026. The technical crew includes cinematographer Madhesh Manickam and editor R. S. Sathish Kumar.

== Music ==
29

Soundtrack album by Sean Roldan
- Genre: Feature film soundtrack
- Language: Tamil
- Label: Sony Music
- Producer: Sean Roldan

Sean Roldan chronology
My Lord (2026)	29 (2026)	Con City (2026)

Singles from 29
- 1. "Seelay Seelay" Released: 13 February 2026; 2. "Mansion Kuthu" Released: 1 April 2026; 3. "Poo Paadal" Released: 14 April 2026

The soundtrack and background were composed by Sean Roldan in his maiden collaboration with Rathna Kumar. The first single "Seelay Seelay" was released on 13 February 2026. The second single "Mansion Kuthu" was released on 1 April 2026. The third single "Poo Paadal" was released on 14 April 2026. The complete soundtrack was released on 6 May 2026.

Track listing
No.	Title	Lyrics	Singer(s)	Length
1.	"Seelay Seelay"	Uma Devi	Sean Roldan, Chinmayi Sripada	5:07
2.	"Polladha Aasaigal"	Uma Devi	Sathyaprakash, Saindhavi	3:54
3.	"Poo Paadal"	Rathna Kumar	Ravi G	2:19
4.	"Mansion Kuthu"	Bakkiyam Shankar	Anthony Daasan, Shibi Srinivasan	3:44
5.	"Nenjagathi"	Mohan Rajan	Vijaynarain	3:59
6.	"Vaadinen Malare"	Sean Roldan	Sean Roldan	2:47
Total length:				21:50

== Release ==
=== Theatrical ===
29 was theatrically released in theatres on 8 May 2026. The film was distributed by K. Vijay Pandi's White Carpet Films in Tamil Nadu.

=== Home media ===
The post-theatrical digital streaming rights were acquired by Netflix. It began streaming there from 5 June 2026.

== Reception ==
Avinash Ramachandran of The New Indian Express gave 3/5 stars and wrote "Even if the packaging isn't all glossy or wrinkle-free, 29 works because there is a sense of honesty and warmth, even if some make your eyes roll to the back of your head". Abhinav Subramanian of The Times of India gave 3/5 stars and wrote, "For a production with Karthik Subbaraj and Lokesh Kanagaraj's names attached, you walk in expecting more punch. What arrives is decent enough, but unlikely to stick". Bhuvanesh Chander of The Hindu wrote "Even when it stumbles in its exploration of identity, Rathna Kumar's film captures the aching fantasy of love with striking conviction".
