= Idhayam (film) =

1991 film directed by Kathir

- Theatrical release poster
- Directed by: Kathir
- Written by: Kathir
- Produced by: T. G. Thyagarajan; G. Saravanan
- Starring: Murali; Heera
- Cinematography: Abdul Rehman
- Edited by: B. Lenin; V. T. Vijayan
- Music by: Ilaiyaraaja
- Production company: Sathya Jyothi Films
- Release date: 6 September 1991
- Running time: 130 minutes
- Country: India
- Language: Tamil

Idhayam (transl. Heart;) is a 1991 Indian Tamil-language romantic drama film directed by Kathir in his directorial debut. It stars Murali and Heera Rajagopal in her debut role; while Chinni Jayanth, Janagaraj, Manorama, and Vijayakumar play supporting roles. The music was composed by Ilaiyaraaja. The film was released on 6 September 1991.

== Plot ==
Raja, an introverted medical student, falls in love with his fellow college mate Geetha but does not express his love to her. When he decides to convey his love, he misunderstands that Geetha is in love with someone else, but in fact, she was helping her sister and the latter's lover unite. Her father does not accept her sister's love, and the pair commits suicide. Towards the end of the final year of college, Raja finally conveys his love to Geetha when she is in the college mourning her sister's death. On the last day of college, Raja learns that the Geetha is about to be engaged soon to someone else. He could not cope with the news, and he suffers a mild heart stroke and is hospitalised. In the meantime, Geetha falls in love with Raja. She visits the hospital to express her love only to find that he has left to catch a train to his native village. She rushes to the railway station and searches for him. She finds her father on the way, and her father accepts her love, she finds Raja's friend Chinni instead and learns of Raja's heart condition that he cannot digest very happy or sad news. Chinni urges Geetha not to meet Raja then and promises that after Raja recuperates, he will unite them. The film ends as Geetha watches the departing train.

== Cast ==
- Murali as Raja
- Heera as Geetha
- Chinni Jayanth as Chinni
- Janagaraj as College Professor
- Manorama as Poochendu, Raja's mother
- Vijayakumar as Geetha's father
- Mohan Raman as the doctor
- Typist Gopu
- Kumarimuthu
- Gundu Kalyanam as a student
- Meesai Murugesan
- Krishnan
- Silk Smitha (special appearance)
- Prabhu Deva (special appearance in the song "April Mayilae")
- Raju Sundaram (special appearance in the song "Ooh Party Nalla")
- Bharathiraja as himself (special appearance)
- Gangai Amaran as himself (special appearance)

== Production ==
Idhayam is the directorial debut of Kathir. Despite her initial apprehensions, Heera was convinced by Thyagarajan to become an actress, and she obliged, crediting the professional approach and continued determination of the film's team to sign her on. TSR Srinivasan made his debut in an uncredited role during a crowd scene.

== Soundtrack ==
Tamil version

The soundtrack for this film was composed by Ilaiyaraaja.

Song	Lyricist	Singers
"April Mayilae"	Vaali	Ilaiyaraaja, Deepan Chakravarthy, S. N. Surendar
"Pottu Vaitha Oru Vatta Nila"	Vaali	K. J. Yesudas
"Pottu Vaitha Oru Vatta Nila"	Vaali	Ilaiyaraaja
"Ohh Party Nalla"	Vaali	Malaysia Vasudevan
"Poongodithan Poothathamma"	Vaali	S. P. Balasubrahmanyam
"Idhayamae Idhayamae"	Piraisoodan	S. P. Balasubrahmanyam

Telugu version

All lyrics for the Telugu dubbed version Hrudayam were written by Rajasri.

Song	Singers
"April Maylalo"	S. P. Balasubrahmanyam
"Oosulade"	S. P. Balasubrahmanyam
"Hrudayama"	S. P. Balasubrahmanyam
"O Pilla Jaaji Mallira"	S. P. Balasubrahmanyam
"Poolathale Poochenamma"	S. P. Balasubrahmanyam

== Release and reception ==
Idhayam was released on 6 September 1991. N. Krishnaswamy of The Indian Express stated, "[T]he unimaginative, half-baked and immature treatment of the story often invites derision." About the cast performances, he said, "Murali, who is more accustomed to action films does not seem to fit into the role [of] the inwardly harried student ... Newface Hira, who has little to do except look serenely at everything around her, is well cast." Krishnaswamy added that Chinni Jayanth was "vibrant as the comedian".

== Legacy ==
Idhayam performed well at the box office, and has since attained cult status in Tamil cinema. Kathir also "carved a niche" for himself in the romance genre; his subsequent films Kadhal Desam (1996), Kadhalar Dhinam (1999) and Kadhal Virus (2002) were also in the same genre. Murali, reprised his role as a final year medical college student in Baana Kaathadi (2010), which marked the debut of his son Atharvaa. Vaibhav's character in Meyaadha Maan (2017) was shy, which led director Rathna Kumar to name the character Idhayam Murali. Atharvaa also starred in a film titled Idhayam Murali, which was released on July 10 2026. The film's title was later reused as a serial under the same name by the same studio.
