= Meyaadha Maan =

2017 film by Rathna Kumar

- Theatrical release poster
- Directed by: Rathna Kumar
- Written by: Rathna Kumar
- Based on: Madhu by Rathna Kumar
- Produced by: Karthikeyan Santhanam; Karthik Subbaraj (Presenter)
- Starring: Vaibhav; Priya Bhavani Shankar; Vivek Prasanna; Indhuja Ravichandran
- Cinematography: Vidhu Ayyanna
- Edited by: Shafique Mohamed Ali
- Music by: Santhosh Narayanan
- Production company: Stone Bench Creations
- Distributed by: Rock Fort Entertainment
- Release date: 18 October 2017
- Country: India
- Language: Tamil

Meyaadha Maan (transl. The deer that does not graze) is a 2017 Indian Tamil-language romantic comedy film written and directed by Rathna Kumar in his feature directorial debut and produced by Karthik Subbaraj's Stone Bench Creations. The film stars Vaibhav and Priya Bhavani Shankar in the leads, with Vivek Prasanna, Indhuja Ravichandran, Arun Prasath, and Amrutha Srinivasan in supporting roles. It is an adaptation of Kumar's own short film Madhu, which he had directed for the Stone Bench Creations anthology film Bench Talkies. This is the film debut of both Priya and Indhuja.

The film focuses on 'Idhayam' Murali, a happy-go-lucky light music singer, and his relationships with his longtime, one-sided love interest Madhumitha, his sister Sudarvizhi and his best friend Vinoth. Kumar was asked by Karthik to adapt his short film Madhu into a feature-length film due to its commercial nature. Except for Vivek Prasanna, the lead cast members of the film were replaced by Vaibhav and Priya for this film. Production was completed silently and the venture was first reported by the media in June 2017, with the film being shot primarily in Royapuram, Chennai.

The film's music is composed by Santhosh Narayanan, whose soundtrack album received a positive response. The film features cinematography handled by Vidhu Ayyanna and editing done by Shafique Muhamed Ali.

Meyaadha Maan was released on 18 October 2017, coinciding with Diwali, and received positive reviews from critics praising the performances of the cast, particularly those of Indhuja and Vivek, and the major technical aspects. The film was a sleeper hit at the box office. Indhuja received a win for Best Supporting Actress at the 11th Ananda Vikatan Cinema Awards, while Vivek Prasanna received an award for Best Supporting Actor at the 10th Vijay Awards.

== Plot ==
Murali, also known as 'Idhayam' Murali by his friends as he is like the emotional lead character from the film, Idhayam (1991), rings his friends, Vinoth and Kishore informing them that he is going to commit suicide, as he is not able to bear the engagement of his college mate, Madhu, with whom Murali has feelings of one-sided love. In an attempt to stop his suicide, Vinoth and Kishore request that Madhu speak badly about Murali, which Madhu does hesitantly. On hearing this, Murali feels outraged and cancels his suicide attempt. He also believes that Madhu is ill-mannered. However, he blabbers about Madhu and how he loved her, which slightly moves Madhu. The marriage is postponed by a year.

One year later, life moves on and Kishore invites Vinoth and Murali to his wedding. However, Vinoth is injured in an accident, so, Murali attends the marriage and also performs with his music crew, "Meyadha Maan." Murali meets Madhu and they pick up a quarrel over a room allotment. Murali walks out of the marriage after understanding that both Vinoth and Kishore are hell bent on ensuring that he does not torture Madhu during the marriage. Madhu is pained to hear that Murali still does not know about the drama on that suicide night.

Meanwhile, Sudarvizhi, Murali's sister learns about her brother's one sided love for Madhu and falls in love with Vinoth. She ensures a fall out with Vinoth as he refuses to see her other than as a sister. Murali learns that Sudarvizhi is in love with Vinoth and happily assures her that he will ensure that she is married to Vinoth. Vinoth does not know about Sudarvizhi's love and feels that she had quarrelled with him as she was suffering from trauma due to a fever and a headache.

One day, Vinoth meets Madhu and thanks her for her noble gesture. Suddenly Madhu falls unconscious. Vinoth admits her to a hospital and is rushing to fetch money for her treatment. Murali is suspicious that Vinoth has fallen in love with someone and follows him to the hospital. Murali gets upset when he sees his friend aiding the treatment of Madhu, whom he believes is his sworn enemy. Subsequently, Murali learns about the drama played by Vinoth and attacks him furiously for making him believe that Madhu is an ill-mannered person. In a jiffy, he starts rejoicing as he realises that Madhu is not ill-mannered and is still not married.

A few days later, Murali finds Madhu falling unconscious and brings her home safely. Soon, Madhu and Murali bury the past and develop a friendship which enrages Madhu's father. Madhu's brother invites Murali for a family function to show him his place. Murali gleefully accepts the invitation. While he enthralls Madhumitha and children by his presence, Madhu's parents are irritated by his presence. Madhu comes to Murali's home the next day to shout at him for accepting the veiled invitation from his family. However she bonds with Sudarvizhi easily and has a good time at Murali's house. Suddenly, Vinoth brings in a marriage alliance for Sudarvizhi. Murali rejects the alliance saying that he has decided to marry his sister to Vinoth. This shocks Vinoth and he is even shocked to see Madhu in Murali's house. Vinoth walks away angrily from Murali's house.

Madhu persuades Murali to talk with Vinoth and gives him an idea to unite Vinoth and Sudarvizhi. The idea works well and Vinoth reciprocates Sudarvizhi's love. Eventually Madhu informs Murali that she is in love with Murali. Madhu's father finds them as a pair and he hastens Madhu's arranged marriage ceremony with a different groom. Murali and Madhu plan to stop the marriage by having premarital intercourse, but they both pick up a quarrel while executing their plan in midway and part ways. Madhu gets ready for marriage, while Murali vows to complete Sudarvizhi's marriage before her marriage. After a few interesting twists and turns, Vinoth marries Sudarvizhi and Madhu reveals that she got pregnant by Murali through the earlier plan of stopping the arranged marriage ceremony. Madhu later ends up attempting to commit suicide as Murali refuses to marry her. As the credits roll, Madhu and Murali sign the marriage papers in the register office and the movie ends with Murali singing on stage with his wife Madhu recording his performance.

== Cast ==
- Vaibhav as 'Idhayam' Murali
- Priya Bhavani Shankar as S. Madhumitha (Madhu)
- Vivek Prasanna as Vinoth
- Indhuja Ravichandran as Sudarvizhi (Sudar)
- Arun Prasath as Kishore
- Amrutha Srinivasan as Priyanka
- Mathew Varghese as Madhumitha's father
- Sujatha Panju as Madhumitha's mother
- Anthony Daasan in a special appearance in the "Thangachi" song
- Pradeep K. Vijayan in a special appearance
- Gopi Gpr
- Saranya Ravichandran as a Band singer

== Production ==
=== Development ===
Karthik Subbaraj insisted Rathna Kumar to develop his short film Madhu into a feature-length film for his production studio Stone Bench Creations. The short featuring actors Sananth, Roshni Abraham and Vivek Prasanna, was earlier included as one of the six stories in Stone Bench Creations' anthology film Bench Talkies, which had a theatrical release in March 2015. Rathna Kumar initially had no intentions of making Madhu into a feature film and had developed it only for his portfolio, but obliged to Karthik's request as producers were not keen on listening to his other scripts and also due to the commercial nature of the short. Rathna Kumar set the film in North Chennai as he was inspired by the creative talents of people in the Royapuram and Kasimedu area, where he found several singers, lyric writers and percussionists during his visits to the areas. The film's lead character runs a light music troupe, making the setting of Royapuram apt for the script. The character's shyness to talk to his lover, meant that Rathna Kumar chose to give the character the name of 'Idhayam' Murali, derived from the timid character made famous by actor Murali in Kathir's romantic drama Idhayam (1991).

=== Casting ===
Rathna Kumar wrote the first draft of the feature film keeping Sananth, who had starred in the short film, in mind. However, the producers opted against signing a relative newcomer and chose Vaibhav to portray the lead role. To prepare for his role, Vaibhav observed the emotions and body language of real stage singers by watching videos. As Roshni Abraham, who was then a corporate employee had chosen not to become a feature film actress, Rathna Kumar discussed the leading female role with Sai Pallavi, who could not accommodate dates. He subsequently announced a casting call online, following which television actress Priya Bhavani Shankar got in touch. Following a successful audition, she was selected to play the leading role of Madhumitha, with Rathna Kumar stating that her on-screen "image" worked for the film. Priya later revealed that she was keen to do the film as it had the backing of Karthik Subbaraj, whose work she liked. Indhuja Ravichandran was selected to be a part of the film after impressing the director with her work in other short films, and was initially worried about her future work and image if she portrayed the sister of Vaibhav's character, before agreeing to star in the film. Vivek Prasanna was the only lead actor to retain his role from the short film. The film's composer Santhosh Narayanan was keen to allow his long-time collaborator Pradeep Kumar to also work on the film as a co-composer, and played a role in bringing him into the project.

=== Filming ===
The film's shoot progressed silently in Royapuram, Chennai and was first revealed to the media only after ninety percent of the shoot was completed. Stone Bench Productions had made the film alongside their commitments for another film directed by Karthik Subbaraj, titled Mercury (2018). Shooting of the film completed in late June 2017, with subsequently post-production activities for the film took place.

== Soundtrack ==
The film's soundtrack album featured seven songs which were composed by Santhosh Narayanan Santhosh also composed the background music for the film, apart from contributing five songs to the soundtrack whereas Pradeep worked on two songs. Besides composing the latter had also penned lyrics for one song, with Rathna Kumar penning two songs and Vivek writing four songs for the soundtrack; radio personality Mirchi Vijay (in his first stint as lyricist) penned one song for this film. All songs in the album consisted of varied genres.

The "Thangachi Song" is a dance number picturised on Vaibhav and Indhuja Ravichandran, which was sung by Anthony Daasan. It was released as a single to coincide with the Hindu festival of Raksha Bandhan on 7 August 2017. The song gained popularity among the film audiences, for the catchy tune and quirky lyrics, with The Indian Express stated "the song perfectly captures the naughtiness and love that siblings share". Another single titled "Enna Naan Seiven" sung by Pradeep Kumar and Kalyani Nair released on 25 August 2017, coinciding with Ganesh Chathurthi. The third single "Address Song" sung by Santhosh Narayanan was released on 13 September 2017. Being one of the typical soup-song genre, Rathna Kumar wanted this song to end the entire genre of bar songs that lambaste women. The album which was marketed by Think Music was released at a promotional launch event held at Loyola College in Chennai on 27 September 2017, with the film's cast and crew and other celebrities in attendance.

== Release ==
=== Theatrical ===
The film's initial theatrical release of 17 November 2017, came as a result of the strike announced by Tamil Film Producers Council over the additional local body tax levied by the Tamil Nadu government, due to which some of the Tamil films which were scheduled for Diwali release excluding the higher profile release Mersal (2017), got delayed. The producers and distributors felt that moving the release forward to coincide with the festival would garner larger audiences and also the spillover audiences from Mersal would instead choose to see Meyaadha Maan. After the strike ended on 12 October, the producers announced for a theatrical release on 18 October 2017.

=== Screening ===
The film opened to 100 screens across Tamil Nadu, but with positive feedback from critics and audiences, it resulted in a steady growth in the number of screens across Tamil Nadu, Malaysia and Singapore within days of the film's release. Some trade analysts believed that the film benefited not only from the word-of-mouth but also due to the unique promotional ways initiated by producers which resulted in the good exposure among audiences.

=== Re-release ===
The film saw a re-release on 7 March 2018. It opened in more than 75 theatres which is the highest for a re-release film.

=== Marketing and distribution ===
The teaser trailer of the film was released by actor Dhanush through his Twitter handle in late July 2017. As a part of the film's promotions, the makers dubbed the film as "Royapurathu La La Land" (La La Land in Royapuram) and released posters and captions on the trailer to depict the film in that particular way. Critics believed that the promotion is a result of the film which explored the similar themes comparing with the 2016 American film of the same name, as both films are of musical romantic genre.

The distribution rights of Meyaadha Maan were acquired by Rockfort Entertainment.

== Reception ==
=== Critical response ===
M. Suganth of The Times of India criticised the lengthy plotline of the film adding that "many scenes go on far longer than they should and make us wish they had been tightly written and edited", but also stated that "since [Rathna Kumar] has also gotten us invested in these interesting characters, we overlook this flaw and take it as a reason to be with these characters for some more time". S. Srivatsan of India Today assigned a score of three-and-a-half out of five saying "the film may appear to be this really intense and emotionally draining film that is usually associated with Karthik Subbaraj. But, it has musical bits, lots of humour and a not-bad romance."

Srinivasa Ramanujam of The Hindu stated that "Director Rathna Kumar's slumberous style of storytelling is both a curse and a blessing". Baradwaj Rangan, in his review for Film Companion, wrote, "Rathna Kumar puts together what could be called a "rooted romcom". The typical romcom is just fluff, the cinematic equivalent of cotton candy — but Meyaadha Maan sets its sights higher. On some level, it's still your typical Kollywood fantasy about a boy and a way-out-of-his-league girl. But you can see the director striving to make each similar-sounding scene look and feel different."

A critic from Sify gave the film a rating of three out of five, calling it "a well-written rom-com that works because of the brilliant performance of the lead actors". Ashameera Aiyyapan in her review for The Indian Express wrote, "Meyaadha Maan characters speak a language of raw, imperfect honesty that is endearing and delightful", but criticising the second half of the film, the review further stated "It could have a been slightly tauter towards the end. But the transgressions are too mild for a film that works on many counts." Arunkumar Shekhar of The New Indian Express wrote, "Quirky twists and splendid music elevate this film from being your regular romance".

=== Box office ===
Meyadha Maan, worldwide, collected overall over Rs 92 lakhs in its opening day and Rs.4.27 crores in its opening weekend. In its opening week it collected over Rs.6.15 crore and collected over Rs 11 crore in its overall domestic collection. Despite being released alongside the higher profile Mersal, it became a sleeper hit.

== Controversy ==
There was a video circulating on the Internet that Indhuja, who made her debut in this film as Vaibhav's sister, has been cast in the lead of her next film Billa Pandi. After reacting to the video, the actress took to her social media where she called the first ever controversy. There were sources stating that Billa Pandi was her second Tamil film, which she corrected and told that Mercury was, in fact, her second Tamil film and she too plays the female lead in that film. Indhuja stated in her social media page, saying that:

"Some people think controversy makes them reach big. Please grow up. Cinema industry these days appreciates talent and rewards hard work. If I wanted to do that to come up in the industry, I would not have struggled for four years to get Meyadha Maan and Mercury, films whose makers respected my talent. If I don't reply to this video now they will keep doing this to the other upcoming actors who have worked hard and struggled to be a part of this cinema industry."

== Accolades ==
Date of ceremony	Award	Category	Recipient(s) and nominee(s)	Result	Ref.
13 January 2018	Ananda Vikatan Cinema Awards	Best Supporting Actress	Indhuja Ravichandran	Won	
14 — 15 September 2018	South Indian International Movie Awards	Best Supporting Actor – Tamil	Vivek Prasanna	Nominated	
14 — 15 September 2018	South Indian International Movie Awards	Best Supporting Actress – Tamil	Indhuja Ravichandran	Nominated	
14 — 15 September 2018	South Indian International Movie Awards	Best Debut Actress – Tamil	Priya Bhavani Shankar	Nominated	
3 June 2018	Vijay Awards	Best Supporting Actor	Vivek Prasanna	Won	
3 June 2018	Vijay Awards	Best Supporting Actress	Indhuja Ravichandran'	Nominated	
3 June 2018	Vijay Awards	Best Male Playback Singer	Ka Ka Bala ("Area Gaana")	Nominated	
3 June 2018	Vijay Awards	Best Debut Director	Rathna Kumar	Nominated	

== Legacy ==
Meyaadha Maan turned out to be a success and an important film in Vaibhav's career because the film was not a multistarrer and several of Vaibhav's successful films had only been multistarrers. In the 2019 Tamil film Petta, he makes a cameo appearance in that film's song, "Aaha Kalyanam" reprising his role as 'Idhayam' Murali.
