= Karathey Babu =

- Film poster
- Directed by: Ganesh K. Babu
- Written by: Ganesh K. Babu; Rathna Kumar; Bakkiyam Sankar
- Produced by: Sundar Arumugam
- Starring: Ravi Mohan; Shakthi Vasudevan; Daudee Jiwal; Anandhi; Nassar; VTV Ganesh
- Cinematography: Ezhil Arasu K.
- Edited by: Kathiresh Alagesan
- Music by: Sam C. S.
- Production company: Screen Scene Media Entertainment
- Country: India
- Language: Tamil

Karathey Babu is an upcoming Tamil language political action drama film directed by Ganesh K. Babu and produced by Sundar Arumugam under banner of Screen Scene Media Entertainment. It stars Ravi Mohan, Daudee Jiwal, Anandhi, Nassar, VTV Ganesh, K. S. Ravikumar, Sandeep Raj, Shakthi Vasudevan, Jeeva Subramanian and others. Initially scheduled for release on 28 August 2026, the film has since been delayed due to issues with the censor board.

== Cast ==
- Ravi Mohan as Shanmugha Babu aka Karathey Babu
- Shakthi Vasudevan
- Daudee Jiwal
- Anandhi
- Nassar
- VTV Ganesh
- K. S. Ravikumar
- Sandeep Raj
- Ravi Mariya
- Jeeva Subramanian
- Kaali Venkat
- Kalki Raja
- Sindhu Priya KS
- Rajendran
- Subramaniam Siva
- Pradeep Anthony
- Vijay Suran
- Kavithalayaa Krishnan
- Sri Dhanya

== Production ==
=== Development ===
Initially named as RM 34, the film got official title on 29 January 2025.

=== Casting ===
While Ravi Mohan played the male lead, Daudee Jiwal played the female lead.

=== Filming ===
Filming wrapped on 5 February 2026.

== Music ==
Sam C. S. composed the music for the film in his third collaboration with Ravi Mohan after Adanga Maru and Siren, replacing Harris Jayaraj who was originally announced. The first single title "Raasaadhi Raasaa" was released on 12 June 2026.

Track listing
No.	Title	Lyrics	Singer	Length
1.	"Raasaadhi Raasaa"	Meenakshi Ilayaraja	Meenakshi Ilayaraja	3:11

== Release ==
=== Theatrical ===
The film was scheduled for a theatrical release on 28 August 2026; however it was postponed to 1 October 2026 due to pending production work, and did not release on this date either. In October 2026, it was reported that the film had been referred to the Revising Committee of the censor board following objections raised during the censor-certification process. A new release date had not been announced at the time of the report.

=== Home media ===
ZEE5 acquired the streaming rights of the film for post theatrical release.
