= Vijay Kartik Kannan =

Indian cinematographer

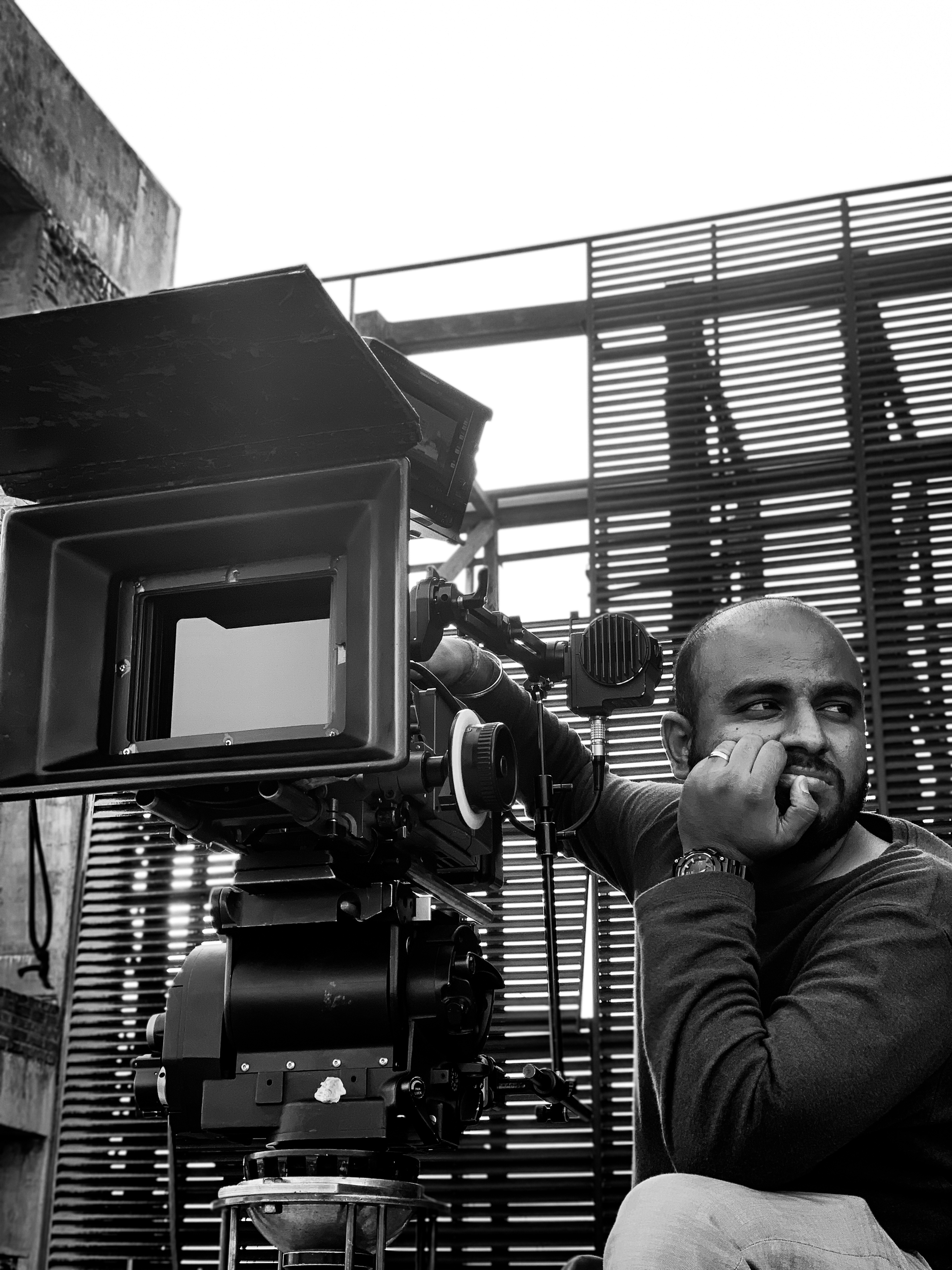
- Kannan while filming Aadai
- Occupation: Cinematographer
- Years active: 2015–present
- Notable work: Doctor (2021); Jailer (2023); Daaku Maharaaj (2025)
- Spouse: Yamini Yagnamurthy

Vijay Kartik Kannan is an Indian cinematographer who predominantly works in Tamil film industry and Telugu cinema. He is highly regarded for his work in Doctor (2021), Jailer (2023), and Daaku Maharaaj (2025).

== Personal life ==
On 16 March 2022, Vijay married fellow cinematographer Yamini Yagnamurthy after being in a relationship for a few years.

== Career ==
Vijay Kartik started his career in cinematography with the Tamil horror film, Darling 2 (2016). After a brief gap, In 2018, Sivakarthikeyan had offered him to work as the cinematographer for his maiden production venture, Kanaa (2018) where he had to decline the offer as he was not confident in completing the film in the specified time. Later, he worked as the cinematographer in Sivakarthikeyan's Doctor (2021), directed by Nelson.

Vijay Kartik worked on Aadai (2019) directed by his long-term friend Rathna Kumar whom he knew for more than 13 years and also worked on Vijay Sethupathi's Sindhubaadh (2019) the same year.

== Filmography ==
- All films are in Tamil, unless mentioned otherwise.

Year	Film	Notes	Ref.
2015	Bench Talkies	Segment: Madhu	
2016	Darling 2		
2017	Kalki	Short film	
2019	Sindhubaadh		
2019	Aadai		
2019	Sillu Karuppatti	Anthology film	
2021	Doctor		
2022	Kaathuvaakula Rendu Kaadhal	Credited for interior shots	
2022	Gulu Gulu		
2023	Ravanasura	Telugu film	
2023	Jailer		
2025	Daaku Maharaaj	Telugu film	
2026	Jailer 2		
2027	Kaaka †	Telugu film	
