= 60 Vayadu Maaniram =

2018 Tamil film by Radha Mohan

- Poster
- Directed by: Radha Mohan
- Written by: Viji (dialogues)
- Screenplay by: Radha Mohan
- Based on: Godhi Banna Sadharana Mykattu
- Produced by: Kalaipuli S. Thanu
- Starring: Vikram Prabhu; Prakash Raj; Samuthirakani; Indhuja Ravichandran
- Cinematography: Manush Nandan
- Edited by: T. S. Jay
- Music by: Ilaiyaraaja
- Production company: V Creations
- Release date: 31 August 2018
- Running time: 136 minutes
- Country: India
- Language: Tamil

60 Vayadu Maaniram (Tamil pronunciation: [arʊbad̪ɯ ʋajad̪ɯ maːn̪ɪram]; transl. 60 years, darkskinned) is a 2018 Indian Tamil-language drama film co-written and directed by Radha Mohan. This movie is the remake of 2016 Kannada box office hit film Godhi Banna Sadharana Mykattu. The film stars Vikram Prabhu, Prakash Raj, Samuthirakani and Indhuja Ravichandran in main lead roles. It was produced by distributor Kalaipuli S. Thanu under his production company V Creations.

The film's score and soundtrack are scored by Ilaiyaraaja. The film's cinematography is handled by Manush Nandan while editing is handled by T.S.Jay. The art direction of the film is handled by K. Kathir.

== Plot ==
Govindarajan (Prakash Raj), a 60-year-old man, has Alzheimer's disease. One day, he suddenly goes missing. His son Shiva (Vikram Prabhu), who is worried by his father's disappearance, embarks on a search with a female doctor named Archana (Indhuja Ravichandran) and during the search they fall in love with each other. Govindarajan gets entangled with Ranga (Samuthirakani), a criminal who has committed a murder. The rest of the film involves whether Shiva finds his father or not.

== Cast ==
- Vikram Prabhu as Shiva Govindarajan
- Prakash Raj as Govindarajan
- Samuthirakani as Ranga
- Indhuja Ravichandran as Dr. Archana
- Bharath Reddy as ACP Badrinath IPS (Badri)
- Elango Kumaravel as Rajappan
- Jangiri Madhumitha as Janaki Rajappan (Jaanu)
- Mohan Raman as Balachandran (Balu)
- Meena Vemuri as Archana's mother
- Daddy Saravanan as Inspector S. Thangaraj
- Raghavan as S.I. Raghunath
- Radha Ramakrishnan as Maria
- Ramesh V as Johnny
- Sarath as Kaasi
- Aroul D. Shankar as Guna
- Anu Krishna as Madhavi

== Production ==
Prakash Raj purchased the rights to remake the 2016 Kannada box office hit film Godhi Banna Sadharana Mykattu in Tamil, Telugu. and Hindi. The production venture of the film commenced in late 2016 which also marked the first remake film in Radha Mohan's filmography.

The official trailer of the film was released on 14 August 2018 and received positive reviews from the audience.

== Soundtrack ==
60 Vayadu Maaniram

Soundtrack album by Ilaiyaraaja
- Released: 2018
- Genre: Feature film soundtrack
- Label: Think Music India

Ilaiyaraaja chronology
Merku Thodarchi Malai (2018)	60 Vayadu Maaniram (2018)	Happi (2019)

The background music for the film was composed by Ilaiyaraaja, while the lyrics were penned by Pa. Vijay, Palani Bharathi and Vivek.

No.	Song	Singers	Lyrics
1	"Iraivinai Thedi"	Ilaiyaraaja	Pa. Vijay
2	"Thedi Thedi"	Benny Dayal, Vibhavari	Palani Bharathi
3	"Naalum Naalum I"	Monali Thakur	Vivek
4	"Naalum Naalum II"	Benny Dayal, Monali Thakur	Vivek

== Reception ==
Times of India wrote "The movie appeals to those who haven't watched the original version or love watching stories on beautiful bonding". Firstpost wrote "On the whole 60 Vayathu Maaniram is refreshingly fresh and likeable for its characters." Behindwoods wrote "With interesting writing for Samuthirakani's portions and an engaging screenplay, 60 Vayadu Maaniram could have looked a lot more complete." India Today called it "Average drama with overdose of emotions". Deccan Chronicle wrote it "is a neatly self-contained film that achieves what it set out to through delicate acting, nuanced cinematography, and serene music".

== Home media ==
In 2023, the satellite rights of the film was sold to Colors Tamil. This movie was premiered on February 5, 2023 at 2 p.m.
