= Gandhi Kannadi =

2025 Tamil film

- Theatrical release poster
- Directed by: Sherief
- Written by: Sherief
- Produced by: Jayi Kiran
- Starring: Bala; Namita Krishnamurthy; Balaji Sakthivel; Archana
- Cinematography: Balaji K Raja
- Edited by: Shivanandeeswaran
- Music by: Vivek–Mervin
- Production company: Adhimulam Creations
- Distributed by: Sakthi Film Factory
- Release date: 5 September 2025
- Running time: 126 minutes
- Country: India
- Language: Tamil

Gandhi Kannadi (transl. Gandhi's glasses) is a 2025 Tamil-language comedy drama film written and directed by Sherief starring Bala and Namita Krishnamurthy in their debut as lead actors alongside Balaji Sakthivel and Archana in important roles. The film is produced by Jayi Kiran under the Adhimulam Creations banner.

Gandhi Kannadi released in theatres on 5 September 2025. The film opened to mixed reviews from critics and audiences.

== Plot ==
In 2016, Kathir owns an event management company and is eager to outdo his competitors. He's in love with Geetha, but rarely gets time to spend with her or appreciate her due to his relentless pursuit of wealth. Gandhi "Gandhi" Mahaan and Kannamma are a happily married elderly couple who eloped from their village to marry against their families' wishes and settled in Madras. Even now, Gandhi and Kannamma share a deep love for each other that's enviable to those around them. Kannamma, who works as a housemaid, desires a grand 60th wedding celebration like her boss's and shares this wish with Gandhi. Gandhi wants to fulfill Kannamma's dream and meets Kathir to arrange their 60th wedding ceremony.

The grand wedding costs around ₹52,00,000 (equivalent to ₹8.2 million or US$87,000 in 2026), so Gandhi, a zamin, takes his ancestral documents in Coimbatore to Kathir to pay for the arrangements, having only managed to save ₹2,50,000 (equivalent to ₹390,000 or US$4,200 in 2026) from his watchman job PF. Gandhi, along with Kathir, Geetha, and Madhan, travels to Coimbatore to see the land and sell or mortgage it. However, they discover a construction is already underway on the land, and Kathir offers to help Gandhi by filing a case to retrieve the land. It turns out Gandhi's brothers forged and sold the land to builders. The builders are willing to pay ₹10,00,00,000 (equivalent to ₹160 million or US$1.7 million in 2026), but Gandhi settles for ₹80,00,000 (equivalent to ₹13 million or US$130,000 in 2026). Eventually, he accepts ₹1,00,00,000 (equivalent to ₹16 million or US$170,000 in 2026), and the wedding arrangements begin after giving Kathir an advance of ₹10,00,000 (equivalent to ₹1.6 million or US$17,000 in 2026).

The Indian government's demonetization announcement renders the 1 crore received from the builder worthless, as it's unaccounted for. Kathir demands payment in new currency notes, but Gandhi struggles to exchange the old notes due to weekly limits and a lack of proper records. They try various means to exchange the money, including a money exchanger who offers a 20% commission, but things don't go smoothly. Gandhi goes missing, and Kathir eventually saves him from the goons who were beating him for his money. Kathir's frustration boils over, and he lashes out at Gandhi for prioritizing his wife's desire for a grand wedding over the well-being of those around him. Gandhi slaps Kathir for disrespecting his love for his wife.

Kathir and Gandhi keep the money struggles a secret from Kannamma, telling her they're stuck in an accident. Meanwhile, Kannamma shows her selflessness by giving Kathir her savings of ₹95,000 (equivalent to ₹150,000 or US$1,600 in 2026), meant for Gandhi's bike, to use for their 60th wedding. She also expresses that a simple marriage would suffice, prioritizing Gandhi's happiness over her own desires. This act moves Geetha, who confronts Kathir about his priorities. Geetha breaks up with Kathir, but they reunite after he opens up about his past and his drive to earn for their future. Kathir's perspective shifts, and he decides to focus on the marriage, but tragedy strikes when he finds Gandhi deceased. Kathir performs Gandhi's last rites, accepting him like a father. In a heart-wrenching turn, Kannamma goes missing the same night, leaving everyone worried.

Nine years later, Kathir runs an orphanage called Gomathi Ammal Adharavatror Illam. A 5-year-old boy named Gandhi, whom Kathir had named in memory of the elderly Gandhi, goes missing from the orphanage. After a thorough search, the police call Kathir to inform him that the boy has been found. Kathir decides to adopt the boy, having searched for Kannamma all these years. In a poignant twist, it's revealed that Kannamma had died alone, mentally unstable and begging on the streets in Kanyakumari, clutching a bag of cash and Gandhi's spectacles, with her pet dog, Tiger, near her corpse.

== Cast ==
- Bala as Kathir
- Balaji Sakthivel as Gandhi "Gandhi" Mahaan / Jamin
- Archana as Kannamma
- Namita Krishnamurthy as Geetha
- Madhan as Madhan
- Amudhavaanan as Sundaram
- Sharath Ravi as Mani
- Abishek Joseph George as Krishna, an advocate
- Manoj Prabhu as young Gandhi
- Aradhya as young Kannamma
- Jeeva Subramanian as Jhansi
- Nikhila Sankar as Sundaram's wife
- Akash
- Pudhupettai Suresh as a money launderer

Uncredited

- Mahanadhi Shankar as a money exchange agent
- TSR Srinivasan as Sankarachari, IDOM Bank Manager
- Muruganandam as the agent's assistant
- Saravana Subbiah as Inspector Mani Mozhian
- Boys Rajan as the invalid land buyer's father
- Ramesh Khanna as Kannamma's boss (cameo appearance)

== Production ==
By the end of June 2025, KPY Bala was announced to make his debut as the lead actor in a film titled Gandhi Kannadi written and directed by Ranam Aram Thavarel (2024) fame Sherief. The film stars Balaji Sakthivel, Archana and Namita Krishnamurthy in the lead roles alongside Bala. The film is produced by Jayi Kiran under the Adhimulam Creations banner. The film also stars Nikhila Sankar, Jeeva Subramanian, Aradhya, Amudhavaanan, Manoj Prabhu, and Madhan in important roles while the technical team consists of cinematographer Balaji K Raja and editor Shivanandeeswaran.

== Music ==
Gandhi Kannadi

Soundtrack album by Vivek–Mervin
- Released: 12 September 2025
- Genre: Feature film soundtrack
- Length: 16:06
- Language: Tamil
- Label: TrendMusic
- Producer: Vivek–Mervin

Vivek–Mervin chronology
Jinn – The Pet (2025)	Gandhi Kannadi (2025)	Andhra King Taluka (2025)

Singles from Gandhi Kannadi
- 1. "Bullet Vandi" Released: 17 July 2025; 2. "Thimurukaari" Released: 18 August 2025; 3. "Hindi Nahi Maalum" Released: 4 September 2025

The film has music composed by the composer duo Vivek–Mervin. The first single "Bullet Vandi" was released on 17 July 2025. The second single "Thimurukaari" was released on 18 August 2025. The third single "Hindi Nahi Maalum" was released on 4 September 2025.

Track listing
No.	Title	Lyrics	Singer(s)	Length
1.	"Bullet Vandi"	Ku Karthik	Anthony Daasan	3:16
2.	"Thimurukaari"	Sherief	Sean Roldan	4:27
3.	"Hindi Nahi Maalum"	Sherief	Deva	3:51
4.	"Kadhal Uyire"	Umadevi	Yuvan Shankar Raja	4:57
Total length:				16:06

== Release ==
Gandhi Kannadi released in theatres on 5 September 2025, clashing with Madharaasi and Bad Girl.

== Reception ==
The film opened to mixed reviews from critics and audiences.

Narayani M of Cinema Express gave 2.5/5 stars and wrote "While it does depict the struggles of the working class, Gandhi Kannadi never truly harbours the strength it possesses in showing the parallels of love amid changing times. [...] But in an overload of emotional and rushed massaging, Gandhi Kannadi seems confused on what it wants to be and say." Abhinav Subramanian of The Times of India gave 2.5/5 stars and wrote "To its credit, the film is a perfect cringe reel. It is cringe watchable, with a few dirty stretches that let the premise breathe. [...] The craft is darker. That is a crime, but the staging rarely finds a visual or narrative kick. Gandhi Kannadi keeps reaching for tears when what it really needs is sense and pace."
