= Sanchana Natarajan =

Indian actress

- Born: Chennai, India
- Other name: Sanjana Mohan
- Occupations: Model, actress
- Years active: 2013-present

Sanchana Natarajan is an Indian model and actress who has appeared in predominantly Tamil-language films. Having appeared in small roles in films including Irudhi Suttru (2016) and 2.0 (2018), Sanchana rose to fame with her role in Balaji Mohan's web series As I'm Suffering From Kadhal (2017).

== Career ==
Sanchana completed her education at CSI Jessie Moses School in Anna Nagar, Chennai before going on to pursue a degree in Visual Communication from MOP Vaishnav College for Women. During her time at college, she became interested in the fashion industry and gained a working knowledge after interacting with models and designers from the fraternity, which led her to develop an affinity for modelling and acting. She walked the ramp for Chennai-based choreographers and designers including Sunil Menon, Srini Subramanian and Dalu; and went on to participate in the Miss South India pageant during 2012. In 2013, she partook in Raj TV's reality television show Tamil Pesum Kadhanayagi, which aimed to find the next best Tamil-speaking lead actress, and won first prize. As a result, Sanchana was offered the chance to make her acting debut through a pivotal role in Balaji Sakthivel's Ra Ra Rajasekhar. Despite beginning shoot in 2014, the film remains unreleased as a result of financial problems faced by the producers, Thirrupathi Brothers. Sanchana then appeared in a small role in Lakshmy Ramakrishnan's Nerungi Vaa Muthamidathe (2014) before working as an actress in YouTube videos and collaborated with Chennai-based entertainment channels, gaining attention for the "Dappangkuthu" video with Put Chutney. She later got introduced to director Balaji Mohan and worked with him on the short film, Jeeboomba. During the period, she also portrayed a small role of a boxing student in Sudha Kongara's bilingual Irudhi Suttru (2016) starring Madhavan and Ritika Singh. The success of the film prompted Sudha to cast her in the same role in the Telugu version, Guru (2017) starring Venkatesh, the following year.

In early 2017, Sanchana competed for the Femina Miss India 2017 title and finished in the top three finalists of the Tamil Nadu quotient. Sanchana made a breakthrough in her acting career after being cast in Balaji Mohan's web series As I'm Suffering From Kadhal (2017), which won positive reviews upon release. Portraying the role of Divya, who is in a live-in relationship with the character of Badri portrayed by Sananth, Sanchana garnered popularity through her performance and later described that she related to "90% of Divya's character". She has also shot for a small role in Shankar's science fiction film 2.0 (2018), where she filmed for scenes alongside Rajinikanth. She played a supporting role in Jagame Thanthiram.

== Filmography ==
=== Films ===
†	Denotes films that have not yet been released

Year	Film	Role	Language	Notes
2014	Nerungi Vaa Muthamidathe	Maya's friend	Tamil	Debut Tamil film
2016	Irudhi Suttru / Saala Khadoos	Boxing student	Tamil / Hindi	Bilingual film; Debut Hindi film
2017	Guru	Boxing student	Telugu	Debut Telugu film; uncredited
2018	Nota	Kalaavathi Varadarajan 'Kayal'	Tamil	
2018	2.0	College student	Tamil	Uncredited
2019	Game Over	Amudha	Tamil	
2019	Game Over	Amrita	Telugu	
2021	Jagame Thandhiram	Valli	Tamil	
2021	Sarpatta Parambarai	Lakshmi	Tamil	
2022	Dear Friend	Amudha	Malayalam	Debut Malayalamfilm
2023	Jigarthanda DoubleX	Paingili	Tamil	
2024	Por	Rishika "Rish"	Tamil	Bilingual film; Also in Hindi
2025	Bottle Radha	Anjalam	Tamil	
2026	John Doe	Inspector A. Rao	Tamil	

=== Television ===
Year	Series	Role	Notes
2010-2012	Kana Kaanum Kaalangal Kalloori Sallai	Sanjana	Star Vijay Debut in TV as a Supporting Actress

=== Web series ===
Year	Series	Role	Notes
2017	As I'm Suffering From Kadhal	Divya	Debut web series
2022	Kaiyum Kalavum	Anbu	

=== Short films ===
Year	Short Film	Role
2015	Jeeboomba Pilot	Female lead
2017	Thirantha Puthagam	Swathi
2018	Akkarai Kathai Ondru	Sanju
2020	Break Free	Sathya

== Awards and nominations ==
Date	Award	Category	Work	Result	Ref.
2018	SIIMA Short Film Awards	Best Supporting Actor - Female	Thirantha Puthagam	Nominated	
2022	67th Filmfare Awards South	Filmfare Award for Best Supporting Actress – Tamil	Sarpatta Parambarai	Nominated	
