= The Court (2026 TV series) =

- Genre: Legal Drama; Procedural; Romantic Drama
- Written by: Bala SB; Srihari Jagannathan
- Directed by: Bala SB
- Starring: Yogalakshmi; Jayaprakash; Arjun Syam Gopan; Magalakshmi Sudarsanan; Muktha George; Vivek Prasanna
- Composer: Rashaanth Arwin
- Country of origin: India
- Original language: Tamil
- No. of seasons: 1
- No. of episodes: 48

Production
- Executive producer: RJ Shyam Sundar
- Producers: Padmini Rajavelu; Rajavelu
- Cinematography: Ajith Srinivasan
- Editor: Nizam
- Running time: 18-30 minutes
- Production company: A Tele Factory

Original release
- Network: JioHotstar
- Release: 4 September 2026 – present

The Court is an Indian Tamil-language legal drama television series. This series is directed by Bala SB and written by Bala SB and Srihari Jagannathan, the series stars Yogalakshmi, Jayaprakash, and Arjun Syam Gopan in lead roles. The plot follows a brilliant young lawyer with a stammer who is forced to take a stand in court against her celebrated lawyer father in pursuit of justice.

The principal characters of the series include Magalakshmi Sudarsanan, Muktha George, Vivek Prasanna, Subash Kannan, Sanjana Tiwari, VJ Kalyani and Gurupharan Karthikeyan.

The series premiered on JioHotstar under the Hotstar Specials label on 4 September 2026.

== Plot ==
Yazhini is a talented young lawyer who struggles with a stuttering and has lived under the imposing shadow of her celebrated father, Raj Sekar, an eminent figure in the legal fraternity. When a significant case pits Yazhini against her father inside the courtroom, she must confront familial ties, self-doubt, and social prejudice to fight for justice and prove her own conviction.

== Cast ==
- Yogalakshmi as Advocate Yazhini "Yazhu" Rajasekar
- Jayaprakash as Rajasekar, Yazhini and Shailaja's father
- Arjun Syam Gopan as Advocate Devaraj "Deva"
- Magalakshmi Sudarsanan as Advocate Shailaja "Shailu" Rajasekar
- Muktha George as Advocate Veni Chandrakanth, Sathyan's love interest
- Vivek Prasanna as Sathyan, Veni's love interest
- Indumathy Manikandan as Late Meera, Yazhini and Shailaja's mother
- Venkat Senguttuvan as Sudalai
- Sanjana Tiwari as Amreen
- Subash Kannan as Vishwa
- VJ Kalyani as Keerthana
- Gurupharan Karthikeyan as Muthu
- Aazhiya as Thivi, Deva's niece
- Roshan A as Kavin
- C. Y. Gajendran as Mahesh
- Kavithalayaa Krishnan as Registrar Sundaram

== Production ==
=== Development ===
The project was greenlit as an original courtroom drama for JioHotstar under the Hotstar Specials banner. It was created by Bala and Srihari Jagannathan, with Bala directing and Jagannathan handling the screenplay alongside assistant writer Gnanababu S. Padmini Rajavelu and Rajavelu produced the show, with RJ Shyam Sundar serving as the executive producer. Technical roles included cinematography by Ajith Srinivasan and editing by Nizam.

=== Release ===
The series was scheduled for release on JioHotstar on 4 September 2026 in Tamil, with dubbed audio versions in Telugu, Hindi, Kannada, and Malayalam.
