= Perusu (2025 film) =

2025 Indian Tamil film by Ilango Ram

- Theatrical release poster
- Directed by: Ilango Ram
- Produced by: Kaarthekeyen Santhanam; Harman Baweja; Hiranya Perera
- Starring: Vaibhav; Sunil Reddy; Niharika NM; Chandini Tamilarasan; Bala Saravanan
- Cinematography: Sathya Thilakam
- Edited by: Sooriya Kumaraguru
- Music by: Arun Raj
- Production company: Stone Bench Films; Baweja Studios; Emberlight Studio
- Distributed by: Sakthi Film Factory
- Release date: 14 March 2025
- Running time: 119 minutes
- Country: India
- Language: Tamil

Perusu (lit. 'Respected elder'; coll. Erection) is a 2025 Indian Tamil-language black comedy film directed by Ilango Ram and jointly produced by Stone Bench Films, Baweja Studios and Ember Light Studio. The film stars Vaibhav, Sunil Reddy, Niharika NM, Chandini Tamilarasan and Bala Saravanan. It is a remake of Ilango's 2023 Sri Lankan Sinhalese film Tentigo. The film released on 14 March 2025 to positive reviews from critics.

== Premise ==
The film revolves around the funeral of an elderly man, whose two sons are dismayed to find his penis is erect upon his death. The brothers attempt to conceal the situation discreetly and are forced to confront their strained relationship and reveal their deceased father's love life.

== Cast ==
- Vaibhav as Duraikannu "Durai"
- Sunil Reddy as M. Saamikannu "Saami"
- Niharika NM as Shanti, Durai's wife
- Chandini Tamilarasan as Thulasi, Saami's wife
- Bala Saravanan as Ameen, Durai's friend
- Munishkanth as Singaram, Durai and Saami's uncle
- Redin Kingsley as Satish, Saami's friend
- VTV Ganesh as a Doctor
- Kaarthekeyen Santhanam as Asokan, a lumberjack-turned-priest
- Nakkalites Dhanam as Bagyam, Durai and Saami's mother
- Deepa Shankar as Sundari, Durai and Saami's aunt
- Karunakaran as a Freezer Box shop owner
- Gajaraj as VAO, family friend
- Shanthi as Kamala, a neighbour
- Swaminathan
- Subatra Robert as Vanitha Mani

== Production ==
On 13 January 2025, the first-look poster of the film titled Perusu was released by Lokesh Kanagaraj having Vaibhav and his brother Sunil Reddy in the lead roles. The film is directed by Ilango Ram, by remaking his own Sinhalese film titled Tentigo (2023). The film is jointly produced by Karthik Subbaraj's Stone Bench Films managed by Kaarthekeyen Santhanam along with Harman Baweja and Hiranya Perera under their Baweja Studios and Ember Light Studio banners respectively. The film also features Niharika NM in her Tamil debut, Bala Saravanan, Karunakaran, Chandini Tamilarasan and others in supporting roles.

The technical team consists of Arun Raj as the music composer, Sathya Thilakam as the cinematographer, Sooriya Kumaraguru as the editor and Sunil Villuwamangalath as the art director.

== Release ==
=== Theatrical ===
Perusu released in theatres on 14 March 2025 in Tamil. The release date of its Telugu dubbed version titled Pedha is yet to be announced. The film was certified "A" by the Central Board of Film Certification.

=== Home media ===
Perusu premiered on Netflix on 11 April 2025 in several Indian languages including its Telugu dubbed version which was renamed from Pedha to Perusu.

== Critical response ==
Abhinav Subramanian of The Times of India gave 3/5 stars and wrote "Perusu never pretends to reach beyond its raunchy premise or offer profound insights into the human condition. It’s a two-hour exercise in committed absurdity that delivers what it promises — a consistent stream of chuckles punctuated by a few genuine laughs." Kirubhakar Purushothaman of News18 gave 3/5 stars and wrote "However, Perusu falls short of becoming a brilliant comedy largely due to its complacency. It doesn’t move away from the phallic jokes, which become redundant after a point. Also, it needed more character depth. We don’t know much about this family till the end." Narayani M of Cinema Express gave 3/5 stars and wrote "In a film that concentrates so much on gags and one-liners, Perusu could have utilised more of such emotional moments to bring some much-needed weight and reflection into the film's overall story."

Anusha Sundar of OTTPlay gave 2.5/5 stars and wrote "Perusu is a harmless film which takes off on a high note, and gives some middling stretches, to finish off decently. Had the film worked more on its dialogues to escalate its characters and scenarios. [...] Nevertheless with its good attempt and clean performances, the film promises a unique watch." Gopinath Rajendran of The Hindu wrote "Perusu, with its simple but effective premise, is a mindless entertainer that works despite certain limitations. At a time when Tamil cinema is meddling more with action flicks and thrillers, Perusu has it all to satiate those who want to laugh out loud and lose track of the number of times you did it."
