= Heartin =

- Theatrical release poster
- Directed by: Kishore Kumar
- Written by: Kishore Kumar
- Produced by: R. Ravindran
- Starring: Sananth; Madonna Sebastian; Emaya T
- Cinematography: Mukes
- Edited by: Barath Vikraman
- Music by: Rajesh Murugesan
- Production company: Trident Arts
- Release date: 26 June 2026
- Running time: 119 minutes
- Country: India
- Language: Tamil

Heartin (transl. The heart's __) is a 2026 Indian Tamil-language romantic comedy film written and directed by Kishore Kumar. Produced by R. Ravindran under Trident Arts and co-produced by Step One Studios, the film stars Sananth, Madonna Sebastian, and Emaya T in the lead roles. It was released on 26 June 2026.

== Plot ==
Shiva and his friend Mani operate a Tamil food joint in Jaipur, Rajasthan. While on a heritage walk at Nahargarh Fort, Shiva meets Sadhana, who becomes instantly infatuated with him. Under the pretext of wanting to eat Tamil cuisine, Sadhana begins frequently visiting Shiva. Although a mutual romantic attraction develops between them, Shiva hesitates to take the relationship further due to his bitter past breakup with Sahithya.

== Cast ==
- Sananth as Shiva
- Madonna Sebastian as Sahithya
- Emaya T as Sadhana
- Whatsapp Mani as Mani
- Debnita Kar as Ankita
- Pragathi as Saraswathi
- Uma Padmanabhan as Varalakshmi
- Ajit Kushwaha as Padmanabhan
- Mathew Varghese as Srinivas

== Production ==
The film was written and directed by Kishore Kumar and produced by R. Ravindran under the banner of Trident Arts, with Step One Studios serving as the co-producer. The cinematography was handled by Mukes, while Barath Vikraman edited the film. The film was shot in locations including Chennai, Jaipur, and Ooty.

== Soundtrack ==
The music and background score were composed by Rajesh Murugesan.

No.	Title	Length
1.	"Heartin Theme"
2.	"Tanjavuru Megam"
3.	"Karaya Karaya"
4.	"Sahitya Theme"
5.	"Oru Nodi"
6.	"Sontham Ellam"
7.	"Ranga Raaniye"

== Release and reception ==
The film was initially scheduled for release in February 2026; it eventually released on 26 June 2026. Abhinav Subramanian of The Times of India wrote, "Romances built on amnesia tend to mistake noise for feeling, piling on contrivance until it all rings false. Heartin keeps the heat low, and a premise you have seen many times over goes down easier than it should". Akshay Kumar of Cinema Express wrote, "Heartin has the ingredients of an engaging romantic drama: An old flame, a new love, and an accident-induced memory loss. But debutant Kishore Kumar never breathes enough life into its people for their joys or heartbreaks to matter".
