= Jeeva Subramanian =

Indian actress

- Born: Chennai, Tamil Nadu
- Other name: Jeeva Akka
- Occupation: Actress

Jeeva Subramanian is an Indian transgender actress from Chennai, Tamil Nadu. She is best known for her role in the film Dorothy (2026). In most of her films she either plays the role as herself or a transgender character.

== Film career ==
Jeeva starred her career as an actress in the film Dharma Durai in which she played a minor role in 2016. She later played a item number in Rajinikanth's Darbar in the song "Kannula Thimiru". She later also appeared in a few films playing minor roles. In 2026, she made her breakthrough with the film Dorothy which gave her recognition for her role and acting skills.

== Filmography ==
Year	Title	Role	Notes
2016	Dharma Durai	Herself	
2019	Airaa	Herself	
2020	Darbar	Item number	Special appearance in the song "Kannula Thimiru"
2022	Gulu Gulu	Herself	
2022	Kaiyum Kalavum	PMC	
2023	Infinity	Herself	
2024	Dange	Gayatri's friend	
2025	Niram Marum Ulagil	Jeeva	
2025	Gandhi Kannadi	Jhansi	
2025	Gevi	Herself	
2025	Aaryan	Nalini / Nambi	Dual role
2025	Good Day	SI Prithiyagara Devi	
2026	Dorothy	Transgender women "Amma"	
2026	Double Occupancy	God	Uncredited role
2026	Sattendru Maarudhu Vaanilai	Akka	Uncredited role
TBA	Karathey Babu †	TBA	Delayed
