= Super Duper (film) =

Tamil-language comedy thriller film directed by Arun Karthik

- Theatrical release poster
- Directed by: Arun Karthik
- Produced by: Shalini Vasan
- Starring: Dhruva; Indhuja; Shah Ra
- Cinematography: Sundar Ram Krishnan; Thalapathy Rathnam
- Music by: Divakara Thiyagarajan
- Production company: Flux Films
- Release date: 20 September 2019
- Running time: 118 minutes
- Country: India
- Language: Tamil

Super Duper is a 2019 Indian Tamil-language drama comedy thriller film written and directed by Arun Karthik. The film stars Dhruva, Indhuja Ravichandran and Shah Ra in the lead roles. The film is produced by Shalini Vasan under the production banner Flux Films. The music for the film is composed by Divakara Thiyagarajan and the cinematography is handled by duo Sundar Ram Krishnan and Thalapathy Rathnam. The principal photography of the film commenced in August 2018 as a short schedule. The film was theatrical released on 20 September 2019.

== Cast ==
- Dhruva as Sathya
- Indhuja as Sherin
- Shah Ra as Mama, Sathya's uncle and Vikram
- Adithya Shivpink as Michael
- Srini as Vedha
- Nagarajan Kannan as Lawrence
- Janaki Suresh as Banu
- Soundariya Nanjundan as Mona
- Saranya Vivek as Chitra
- Akila Murali as Hema
- V. R. Balaji as Kutty
- A. M. Senthamizhan as Neruppu
- Easter Raj as Seenu
- Akshita Merlyn as child Sherin
- Magesh Swami Kannu as Bobby
- Vaishali Balaji as Swetha
- Shivakumar Raju as Shivam
- Pradeep Raj as Babu
- Kavan as Mani
- Sathish Kumar P as Sathish
- Ramkumar as Sethu
- Guna Babu as Guna
- Santhosh as Arivu
- Gowri Shankar M. as Gowri
- Rolling Sir Abhinayakumar as Abhinayakumar

== Reception ==
The Times of India gave the film a rating of two-and-a-half out of five stars and wrote that "Super Duper has some flashy visuals but fails in its storytelling". The Hindu Tamil Thisai praised the screenplay of the film. Dinamalar gave the film a rating of two out of five. Maalai Malar praised the cinematography and the music.
