= TSR Srinivasan =

Indian actor

- Born: Dharmaraj
- Other name: TSR Dharmaraj
- Occupations: Actor, politician
- Years active: 1991; 2014–present
- Known for: Actor
- Political party: Indian National Congress

TSR Dharmaraj, also popularly known as TSR Srinivasan, is an Indian actor and politician representing the party Indian National Congress who predominantly featured in Tamil films.

== Career ==
Srinivasan worked in the textile industry in Tiruppur. After some time in the textile industry, he lost the appetite due to workload, trade embargoes, financial constraints and persistent losses. He worked as a restaurant franchisee in the 1990s. He later pursued an interest in acting after gaining a source of inspiration from his reading habits. In an interview, he credited that reading books eventually paid rich dividends for him, which propelled him to embark on pursuing greener pastures by venturing into the cine field. In the beginning of his film acting career, he received a remuneration of INR 200–300 per film and he began to make inroads by accepting minor roles, uncredited roles in films. He also revealed that he waited in the queues for film casting in pursuit of potential opportunities to act in films. He revealed that he was present as a crowd artist among the crowd which was gathered at the shooting location of Idhayam (1991) and Aranmanai (2014). His first role that got him recognition was in Sethupathi (2016), where he plays the role of an investigation officer.

He played a full-fledged villainous character named Dharmaraj in ZEE5's family thriller television series Ayali (2023). He participated in Top Cooku Dupe Cooku season 2 as a contestant.

== Filmography ==
=== Tamil films ===
- Idhayam (1991)
- Aranmanai (2014)
- Vindhai (2015)
- Aagam (2016)
- Sethupathi (2016)
- Jithan 2 (2016)
- Manithan (2016)
- Rekka (2016)
- Enakku Vaaitha Adimaigal (2017)
- Si3 (2017)
- Theeran Adhigaaram Ondru (2017)
- Oru Kidayin Karunai Manu (2017)
- Sandakozhi 2 (2018)
- Thimiru Pudichavan (2018)
- Devarattam (2019)
- Monster (2019)
- Kalavani 2 (2019)
- Aadai (2019)
- Namma Veettu Pillai (2019)
- Petromax (2019)
- Puppy (2019)
- Bigil (2019)
- Walter (2020)
- Ponmagal Vandhal (2020)
- Mookuthi Amman (2020)
- Kaadan (2021)
- Aranmanai 3 (2021)
- Enemy (2021)
- Bachelor (2021)
- Tamil Rockers (2021)
- Gulu Gulu (2022)
- Idiot (2022)
- Panni Kutty (2022)
- The Legend (2022)
- Kaatteri (2022)
- Poikkal Kudhirai (2022)
- Kadamaiyai Sei (2022)
- Cobra (2022)
- Diary (2022)
- Kanam (2022)
- Sardar (2022)
- Gatta Kusthi (2022)
- Parole (2022)
- Gatta Kusthi (2022)
- Run Baby Run (2023)
- Bagheera (2023)
- Kondraal Paavam (2023)
- Kannai Nambathey (2023)
- Kondraal Paavam (2023)
- August 16 1947 (2023)
- Vaan Moondru (2023)
- Mark Antony (2023)
- Japan (2023)
- Annapoorani: The Goddess of Food (2023)
- Siren (2024)
- PT Sir (2024)
- Ini Oru Kadhal Seivom (2024)
- Indian 2 (2024)
- 7/G (2024)
- Jolly O Gymkhana (2024)
- Kudumbasthan (2025)
- Otha Votu Muthaiya (2025)
- Aghathiyaa (2025)
- Sabdham (2025)
- The Door (2025)
- House Mates (2025)
- Gandhi Kannadi (2025)
- Will (2025)
- Kambi Katna Kathai (2025)
- Others (2025)
- Gilli Mappilai (2026)
- Youth (2026)
- Sannidhanam P.O (2026)
- Hi (2026)
- Singgaramm (2026)

=== Other language films ===
- Aranya / Hathi Mere Saathi (2021; Telugu/Hindi)
- Oke Oka Jeevitham (2022; Telugu)
- Varshangalkku Shesham (2024; Malayalam) as art director Ilango
- Game Changer (2025; Telugu)

=== Web series ===
- Vella Raja (2018)
- Karoline Kamakshi (2019)
- Ayali (2023)
- Office (2025)

=== Music videos ===
- Pavazha Malli
