= Parking (2023 film) =

Film by Ramkumar Balakrishnan

- Theatrical release poster
- Directed by: Ramkumar Balakrishnan
- Written by: Ramkumar Balakrishnan
- Produced by: Sudhan Sundaram
- Starring: Harish Kalyan; M. S. Bhaskar; Indhuja
- Cinematography: Jiju Sunny
- Edited by: Philomin Raj
- Music by: Sam C. S.
- Production companies: Passion Studios; Soldiers Factory
- Release date: 1 December 2023
- Running time: 128 minutes
- Country: India
- Language: Tamil

Parking is a 2023 Indian Tamil-language psychological thriller film written and directed by Ramkumar Balakrishnan. Produced by Passion Studios and Soldiers Factory, the film stars Harish Kalyan, M. S. Bhaskar and Indhuja, with Rama Rajendra, Prathana Nathan, Ilavarasu and Vetrivel Raja in supporting roles. It follows a duplex tenant (Harish) who purchases a car, but this leads to escalating tensions with another tenant (Bhaskar) over their parking space.

Parking is the directorial debut of Ramkumar and was primarily shot in Chennai. The film was theatrically released on 1 December 2023 and received positive reviews from critics. It won three National Film Awards: Best Tamil Feature Film, Best Supporting Actor (Bhaskar) and Best Tamil Screenplay (Ramkumar).

== Plot ==
Eshwar, a 28-year old man, and his pregnant wife Aathika, rent the top floor of a duplex. S. Ilamparuthi, the Executive Officer of the Kundrathur Town Panchayat, lives on rent on the ground floor with his wife Selvi and daughter Aparna. Despite their contrasting lifestyles, the two families initially get along well until Eshwar buys a new car for his wife to travel in comfortably. Ilamparuthi, who has lived in the duplex for the last ten years and has kept the entire parking space to himself since neither he nor the previous top floor tenants ever owned a car, is uncomfortable with Eshwar's car parked there. After a few incidents, both begin to fight for rights over the parking space. Ilamparuthi sells his motorbike for a car to ensure that Eshwar does not park his car in the parking space.

Eshwar and Ilamparuthi continue to fight over the parking space, which culminates with Ilamparuthi breaking Eshwar's car window when Eshwar manages to park his car ahead of him. They quarrel in full public view, which escalates when Ilamaparuthi insults Eshwar's mother, causing Eshwar to slap him. Seeking revenge for the slap, Ilamparuthi and his brother-in-law force Aparna to file a false case of harassment against Eshwar. He is arrested, but Aparna, feeling guilty, withdraws the complaint and Eshwar is released. In retribution, Eshwar frames Ilamparuthi for accepting a bribe of ₹30,000 (equivalent to ₹33,000 or US$340 in 2026), leading to his suspension. Despite Aathika pleading with Eshwar, and Selvi and Aparna begging Ilamparuthi not to escalate their tensions, the duo refuse to budge. Ilamparuthi loosens Eshwar's front tyre, which leads to a near-fatal accident when Eshwar is returning with Aathika from hospital after her regular checkup.

Having deduced that Ilamparuthi is responsible, Eshwar wrecks his car in revenge. Fed up with Ilamparuthi's behaviour towards Eshwar, Selvi and Aparna leave him. Eshwar, on Aathika's insistence, decides to move out. He manages to find another home, then meets with Ilamparuthi to inform him of the same and condescendingly asks him to leave them alone. Feeling insulted, Ilamparuthi knocks him out in rage. At this juncture, he finds that Aathika has gone into labour but seemingly does nothing. When Ilamparuthi returns, Eshwar regains consciousness and knocks him out, refusing to listen when Ilamparuthi tries to inform him about his wife's condition.

Eeshwar starts heating Ilamparuthi's mobile phone in a microwave oven and orchestrating a gas leak with the intention of killing him, but when he eventually learns that Ilamparuthi had helped Aathika by driving her to the hospital, where she gave birth, he realises his mistake and switches off the main power supply for the house, averting a major disaster. At the hospital, Eshwar and Ilamparuthi – who has reunited with his family – apologise to each other for what had happened and agree they could have adjusted and handled the parking issue in a matured manner.

Sometime later, both families have vacated the duplex. A broker allows a couple to rent either floor, with one condition being that they must not own a car, to which they agree.

== Cast ==
- Harish Kalyan as Eshwar
- M. S. Bhaskar as S. Ilamparuthi
- Indhuja as Aathika
- Rama Rajendra as Selvi
- Prathana Nathan as Aparna
- Ilavarasu as the house owner
- Vetrivel Raja as the house broker
- Vijay Sathya as the police inspector
- Kannayiram as Ganesan

== Production ==
Parking, the directorial debut of Ramkumar Balakrishnan, was announced to the media in June 2023. By that time it was close to wrapping. Ramkumar said the film was inspired by his and his friends experiences with parking trouble. M. S. Bhaskar was cast after the director was impressed with his performance in 8 Thottakkal (2017). To finalise the duplex that features in the film, the makers saw around 150 to 180 houses. Filming was completed in 35 working days; the film was primarily shot in Virugambakkam and Valasaravakkam, neighborhoods in Chennai, while a few scenes were shot at East Coast Road. The lead actors Harish Kalyan and Indhuja promoted the film by appearing as guests during the seventh season of Bigg Boss in late November 2023.

== Music ==
Parking

Soundtrack album by Sam C. S.
- Released: 2023
- Genre: Feature film soundtrack
- Length: 10:10
- Language: Tamil
- Label: Think Music

Sam C. S. chronology
Phoenix (2023)	Parking (2023)	Siren (2024)
External audio
- Parking – Jukebox on YouTube

The music for the film was composed by Sam C. S.

Track listing
No.	Title	Lyrics	Singers	Length
1.	"Chella Kalliye"	Sam C. S.	Kapil Kapilan	3:28
2.	"Neero"	Vishnu Edavan	Abhijith Rao	2:40
3.	"Yevan Nallavan"	Sam C. S.	Sam C. S.	2:22
4.	"Parking Theme" (Instrumental)	—	—	1:40
Total length:				10:10

== Release ==
=== Theatrical ===
Parking was theatrically released on 1 December 2023.

=== Home media ===
The film began streaming on JioHotstar from 30 December 2023.

== Reception ==
=== Critical response ===
Parking received positive reviews from critics. M. Suganth of The Times of India gave the film 4 out of 5 stars and wrote, "Even though Parking is in the space of a domestic drama, Ramkumar Balakrishnan narrates it in the tone of a thriller, ratcheting up the thrills, with help from Philomin Raj's sharp editing and Sam CS's suspenseful background score". Gopinath Rajendran of The Hindu said, "Harish Kalyan's Parking might get predictable after a while, but the exceptional lead cast and an intriguing plot make it a winner." In a less positive review, Janani K of India Today wrote, "Parking is all about two exceptional performances from legendary MS Bhaskar and Harish Kalyan. Beyond them, the film hardly moves forward". Sruthi Ganapathy Raman wrote for Film Companion, "The filmmaker does run out of the same steam that once kept this chaotic car ride going, towards the last act. But despite its lack of know-how, Parking is still a trip worth your time for all the raw discomfort it makes you feel".

=== Box office ===
According to a report by News18, Parking was made on a budget of ₹6 crore (equivalent to ₹6.5 crore or US$680,000 in 2026) and grossed ₹17 crore (equivalent to ₹19 crore or US$1.9 million in 2026). Raisa Nasreen of Times Now noted that the film struggled at the Chennai box office due to the effects of Cyclone Michaung in early December. Despite this, the director and producer of Parking donated ₹2 lakh (equivalent to ₹2.2 lakh or US$2,300 in 2026) for relief efforts.

== Accolades ==
Event	Category	Recipient(s)	Ref.
71st National Film Awards	Best Tamil Feature Film	Parking	
71st National Film Awards	Best Supporting Actor	M. S. Bhaskar	
71st National Film Awards	Best Tamil Screenplay	Ramkumar Balakrishnan	

== Potential remakes ==
In May 2024, it was reported that Parking was planned to be remade in Telugu, Malayalam, Hindi, Kannada and a non-Indian language.
