= Snakes and Ladders (Indian TV series) =

- Genre: Black comedy Thriller; Drama
- Created by: Kamala Alchemis; Dhivakar Kamal; Creative Producer; Karthik Subbaraj
- Directed by: Ashok Veerapan; Bharath Muralidharan; Kamala Alchemis
- Starring: Naveen Chandra; Nandaa; Manoj Bharathiraja; Muthukumar; Srinda; M. S. Samrith; S. Surya Ragaveshwar; S. Suryakumar; Tarun Yuvraaj; Sasha Bharen; Vishnu Bala; Ramachandran Durairajan; Dileepan; Sreejith Ravi; Subash Selvan
- Theme music composer: Prithvi Chandrasekhar
- Country of origin: India
- Original language: Tamil
- No. of seasons: 1
- No. of episodes: 9

Production
- Executive producer: Arjun Ukramakali
- Producer: Kalyan Subramanian
- Editor: Radha Sridhar
- Camera setup: Multi-camera
- Running time: approx.26–34 minutes per episode
- Production company: Stone Bench Creations

Original release
- Network: Amazon Prime Video
- Release: 18 October 2024

Snakes and Ladders is a 2024 Indian Tamil-language thriller television series created by Kamala Alchemis and Dhivakar Kamal for Amazon Prime Video. The show is directed by Ashok Veerapan, Bharath Muralidharan and Kamala Alchemis, Produced by Kalyan Subramanian under the banner of Stone Bench Creations, the show revolves around journey of a group of school-going children, police, and a gang of brainless thugs.

The principal characters of the series include Naveen Chandra, Nandaa, Manoj Bharathiraja, Muthukumar, Srinda, M. S. Samrith, S. Surya Ragaveshwar, S. Suryakumar, Tarun Yuvraaj, Sasha Bharen, Vishnu Bala, Ramachandran Durairaj, Dileepan, Sreejith Ravi and Subash Selvan. It premiered on 18 October 2024 on Amazon Prime Video.

== Cast ==
- Naveen Chandra as Leonard
- Nandaa as Chezhian
- Manoj Bharathiraja as Mahalingam
- Muthukumar as Richard
- Srinda as Raagi's Mother
- M. S. Samrith Surya as Gilbert
- S. Surya Ragaveshwar as Iraiyan
- S. Suryakumar as Sandy
- Tarun Yuvraaj as Bala
- Sasha Bharen as Raagitha
- Vishnu Bala as Vinay
- Ramachandran Durairaj as Blade
- Dileepan
- Sreejith Ravi
- Subash Selvan as Paari
- Samrithsajith as Gilbert

== Episodes ==
No. overall	No. in season	Title	Directed by
1	1	"Square One"	Bharath Muralidharan
2	2	"Four Feet Under"	Bharath Muralidharan
3	3	"Friend or Foe?"	Bharath Muralidharan
4	4	"A Beautifull Mind"	Ashok Veerapan
5	5	"Young Blood"	Ashok Veerapan
6	6	"Back to Square One"	Bharath Muralidharan
7	7	"A New Hope"	Ashok Veerapan
8	8	"Larcenist"	Kamala Alchemis
9	9	"Sought"	Kamala Alchemis

== Development ==
=== Production ===
The series was announced by Karthik Subbaraj in March 2024. Creative producer of this series is Karthik Subbaraj under the banner of Stone Bench Creations, which has already produced an anthology film series, Putham Pudhu Kaalai, for Amazon Prime Video in 2020.

=== Release ===
The first trailer was released on Tuesday 9 October 2024 featuring and revel of release date. The series was scheduled for a worldwide release on 18 October 2024 on Amazon Prime Video along with dubbed versions in Telugu, Malayalam, Kannada and Hindi languages.
