= Vivek Prasanna =

Indian actor

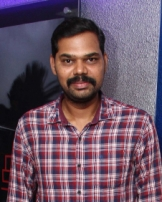
- Born: Salem, Tamil Nadu, India
- Occupation: Actor
- Years active: 2016–present
- Relatives: Karthik Netha (brother)

Vivek Prasanna is an Indian actor who appears in Tamil language films, mostly in supporting roles. In 2017, he won the Vijay Award for Best Supporting Actor for his performance in the film Meyaadha Maan.

== Career ==
After several appearances in short films and telefilms, he made his acting debut alongside Vijay Sethupathi in Arun Kumar's police drama Sethupathi (2016).

In 2017, Vivek Prasanna made a breakthrough and appeared in supporting roles in a series of successful Tamil films. His role as the drug lord Ravi in Vikram Vedha and as a politician in Peechankai, also won him acclaim. He then appeared as the second lead in the romantic comedy, Meyaadha Maan, winning rave reviews for his portrayal of the character of Vinoth, eventually earning the Vijay Award for Best Supporting Actor. First, he declined the role of Vinoth in the movie, but director Rathna Kumar convinced him to do the role. Rathna Kumar trusted Vivek Prasanna can be noted on his role for his acting. Later, he was cast in commercial films such as Velaikkaran (2017), Irumbu Thirai (2018), Petta (2019) and Soorarai Pottru (2020). Vivek Prasanna played in the survival thriller Parundhaaguthu Oor Kuruvi (2023).

== Filmography ==
=== Film ===
List of Vivek Prasanna film credits
Year	Film	Role	Notes
2015	Bench Talkies - The First Bench	Vinoth	Debut
2015	144	Chetta's henchman	Uncredited role
2016	Jil Jung Juk	Film Director	
2016	Sethupathi	Madhivaanan	
2016	Iraivi	Director	
2017	Maanagaram	Jeeva's friend	
2017	Peechankai	Nallathambi	
2017	Vikram Vedha	Ravi	
2017	Podhuvaga Emmanasu Thangam	Murugesan	
2017	Meyaadha Maan	Vinoth	Vijay Award for Best Supporting Actor
2017	Velaikkaran	Babu	
2018	Irumbu Thirai	Loan collection agent	
2018	Maniyaar Kudumbam	Narthanga Saamy's nephew	
2019	Petta	College professor	
2019	Charlie Chaplin 2	Dubai Raja	
2019	Nenjamundu Nermaiyundu Odu Raja	Local goon	
2019	Sindhubaadh	Passenger	
2019	Gorilla	Venkat	
2019	Aadai	Gowri	
2020	Soorarai Pottru	Sebastian	
2021	Sarbath	Anbu	
2022	Chota		
2022	Udanpaal	Murali	
2023	Run Baby Run	Jai Ganesh	
2023	Parundhaaguthu Oor Kuruvi	Maaran	
2023	Paayum Oli Nee Yenakku		
2023	Regina	Corrupt Police Officer	
2023	Thandatti	Show Pandi	
2023	Love	Ajay's friend	
2024	Inga Naan Thaan Kingu	Amalraj and Baski	
2024	Dhonima		
2024	Lal Salaam	Raji	
2024	Hitler	Selva's friend	
2024	Petta Rap	Balu's friend	
2024	Black	Manohar	
2024	Aalan	Thyagu's maternal uncle	
2024	Family Padam	Sarath Kumar	
2025	Ring Ring	Thyagu	
2025	Sabdham	Deepak	
2025	Trauma	Sundar	
2025	3BHK	Prabhu's manager	
2025	Maareesan	“Network” Ganesh/ Arun	
2025	Diesel	Balamurugan	
2025	Kinaru		
2026	Pookie	Kailash's friend	
2026	Blast	Ilango	

=== Television ===
List of Vivek Prasanna television credits
Year	Program Name	Role	Network	Notes	Ref.
2019	Madras Meter Show	Guest	ZEE5	Reality Show	
2026	Mammatiyaan Stars	Abdul Bhaai			

=== Web series ===
List of Vivek Prasanna web series credits
Year	Program Name	Role	Network	Notes	Ref.
2020	Triples	Maadhavan Raamamirtham aka Maadhu	Disney+ Hotstar	Debut Web Series	
2020	Kannamoochi	Devaraj	ZEE5		
2020	November Story	Malarmannan	Disney+ Hotstar		
2022	Kaiyum Kalavum	Vakkil	SonyLIV		
2022	Vadhandhi: The Fable of Velonie	SI Ramar	Amazon Prime Video		
2026	Vadhandhi: The Mystery of Mani	SI Ramar	Amazon Prime Video		
2026	The Court	Sathyan	JioHotstar		
