= Tentigo =

Sinhala-language black comedy film

- Promotional poster
- Sinhala: නෙළුම් කුළුණ
- Directed by: Ilango Ram
- Written by: Ilango Ram
- Produced by: Hiranya Perera
- Starring: Kaushalya Fernando; Priyantha Sirikumara; Thusitha Laknath; Ranjith Panagoda
- Cinematography: Ilango Ram
- Edited by: Aathan Sivananthar
- Music by: Leon Bob James
- Production companies: Silent Frames Productions; Crawling Angel Films; Stone Bench Films
- Release dates: 15 November 2023 (Tallinn Black Nights Film Festival); 14 March 2025 (Sri Lanka)
- Running time: 105 minutes
- Country: Sri Lanka
- Language: Sinhala
- Box office: 450 Million LKR

Tentigo (Sinhala Nelum Kuluna (Note: This translates to Lotus Tower and is a euphemism for an erect penis.)) (Sinhala: නෙළුම් කුළුණ) is a 2023 Sri Lankan Sinhalese black comedy film directed by Ilango Ram and produced by Hiranya Perera for Silent Frames Productions. The film stars Kaushalya Fernando, Priyantha Sirikumara, Thusitha Laknath and Ranjith Panagoda. It is the first Sri Lankan film to be remade into other languages including: Spanish, Italian, English, Hindi, Telugu, Malayalam whereas France and Belgium in the future. The film was remade in Tamil by Ilango Ram as Perusu (2025).

After gaining positive reviews from critics in multiple film festivals, the film won the special jury award at the Tallinn Black Nights Film Festival in 2023 and was screened at the Glasgow Film Festival and Mostra in 2024. It got selected at the 2nd Eikhoigi Imphal International Film Festival 2025 under the International Competition: Fiction section.

== Plot ==
After their father dies, and a funeral is arranged, his penis remains mysteriously erect. His two sons try to discreetly hide it for the funeral while his secret love life gets revealed.

== Cast ==
Most of the characters in the film are not named.

- Ranjith Panagoda as Wilbert Jayabahu, the father
- Kaushalya Fernando as the mother
- Priyantha Sirikumara as the elder son
- Thusitha Laknath as the younger son
- Chandani Seneviratne as Kamala, the neighbor
- Dilhani Ekanayake as mistress
- Chamila Peiris as mother's younger sister
- Sulochana Weerasinghe as younger son's wife
- Aloka Gayathrie as elder son's wife
- Asela de Silva as doctor
- Saman Koralage as trishaw driver
- Madura Prabhaswara as flowershop manager
- Raja Ganesan as father's friend
- Sarath Moronthuduwa as father's friend
- Sanjeewa Upendra as devil dancer
- Asoka Wendabona as Grama niladhari
- Kanchana Nandani as nurse
- Suleiman Dias as Head Monk
- Pradeep Senaratne as Young Monk
- Aloka Sampath as embalmer
- Ranjula Fernando as embalmer
- Prasanna Kassumpitiya as younger brother's friend
- Ruwan Madanayake as elder brother's friend
- Manjula Ranasinghe as elder brother's friend
- Ravi Bodahandi as Barman

=== Child artists ===
- Metika Naveen Senaratne
- Kusheya Anagi
- Sehanya Jayasinghe

== Production ==
This the maiden feature film direction by Ilango 'Ram' Ramanathan, who excelled in the Sri Lankan advertising industry as well as an award-winning short film maker who made the short films: Nihanḍa Kanduḷu, Ginigath Piyāpath and Doḍana Kelī. He also wrote the screenplay and did the cinematography. The film is produced by Hiranya Perera with co-production by Sanjay Gulati, Neeraj Pandey, Karthikeyan Santhanam, Navaneetha Nachimuthu and Pon Umapathy Kailas. Aathan Sivananthar is the editor and Manjula Perera is the production manager.

Muditha Withana and Aruna Sanjaya are the assistant cinematographers, where the assistant director are Niroshan Edirimanne and Prasanna Niroshan. The sound design and editing was done by Nanda Nandi Jayakody, sound mixing by Tapas Nayak and color mixing by Dinindu Jagoda. Leon Bob James is the music director, where Rangana Sinharage handled music and sound supervision. Charumathi Muralidharan made background vocals, Ajantha Alahakoon made production planning and Rajitha Dikhinna made styling and hairstyling. Composition assistants are Navodya Sathsara and Suhan Perera, and production management assistant is Upamali Nuwarapaksha. Ajantha Alahakoon and Niroshan Suranjith made costumes with the assistance of Anusha Ayanthi Seneviratne. Still photography is handled by Sanjeevan Sangilakumar.

== Reception ==
Jennie Kermode of the UK-based Eye For Film rated the film 3/5 stars and wrote, "Despite juggling an increasingly large number of characters, most of whom are never named, the film keeps its balance well". Panos Kotzathanasis of Asian Movie Pulse wrote, "As a whole, however, and for most of its duration, it makes sense, while it will be interesting to see where Ram moves following this movie". Rebecca of Film Carnage rated teh film 8/10 stars and wrote, "Tentigo is a clever comedy, it captures a bizarre and satisfyingly ridiculous situation while never itself feeling over the top. It has a surprising and unusual balance to handle the topic of grief in a respectful manner, while being funny throughout". Eoghan Lyng of D Movies wrote, "Ilango Ram’s family drama is actually one of the most original comedies in some time" and added that "[t]here is a little bit too much going on, for too long, but when the characters finally reach their point of destination, it feels well earned". Nikhiil Akhiil of High On Films rated the film 4/5 stars and wrote, "With the aid of witty writing and a perfect ensemble, this film stands out as a new-wave dark comedy entry from Sri Lanka". Jhanvi Vipin of Strathclyde Telegraph rated the film 4/5 stars and wrote, "Ultimately, it’s a comedy-drama film that highlights that humour and sorrow can co-exist and that hidden secrets can unveil at the worst (or funniest!) of times".
