= Kaiyum Kalavum =

Indian drama streaming web series

- Promotional poster
- Genre: Drama comedy Romance; Adventure
- Written by: Roju
- Directed by: Roju
- Starring: Sanchana Natrajan; Rohit; Madonna Sebastian; Ramya Nambessan; Senthil; Karu Palaniyappan; Vivek Prasanna; Vijay Adiraj; Jeeva Subramanian; Chinmayi and Simha (Narrators)
- Composers: Score: Sundaramurthy KS; Songs: Satish Raghunathan
- Country of origin: India
- Original language: Tamil
- No. of seasons: 1
- No. of episodes: 8

Production
- Producer: Kalyan Subramanian
- Production location: India
- Cinematography: Sandeep K. Vijay
- Editors: Manikandan B. Radha Sridhar
- Running time: 24-47 minutes
- Production company: Stone Bench Films

Original release
- Network: SonyLIV
- Release: 4 November 2022

Kaiyum Kalavum (transl. Red handed) is an Indian streaming television series written and directed by Roju Produced by Kalyan Subramanian and Presented by Karthik Subbaraj under his banner Stone Bench films. The series stars Sanchana Natrajan, Rohit, Madonna Sebastian, Karu Pazhaniappan, Senthil, Ramya Nambessan, Vivek Prasanna, Vijay Adiraj. Chinmayi and Simha serve as Narrators of the series. Music and background score was composed by Sundaramurthy KS and songs by Satish Raghunathan Cinematography handled by Sandeep K Vijay and editing was done by Manikandan B and Radha Sridhar. The series was released at SonyLIV on 4 November 2022.

== Cast ==
- Sanchana Natrajan as Anbu
- Rohit Nandakumar (Roju) as Boy
- Madonna Sebastian as Meenakshi
- Ramya Nambessan as House wife
- Jeeva Subramanian as PMC
- Gajaraj as Police Officer
- Senthil as The Father
- Karu Palaniyappan as Librarian
- Vivek Prasanna as Vakkil
- Vijay Adiraj as the Chief Doctor
- Vikas Muppala as Aayiram
- Avinash Raghudevan as Nalla
- Jane Thompson as Mandhiri
- Amrutha Srinivasan in a cameo appearance

=== Narrators ===
- Chinmayi Sripada as Akka/Partner
- Bobby Simha as Anna/Partner

== Production ==
On 27 October 2022 S J Suryah revealed the first look Poster on Twitter. SonyLiv released the official trailer of the series on 28 October 2022.

== Music ==
The soundtrack album and background score for Kaiyum Kalavum were composed by Sundaramurthy KS and songs by Satish Raghunathan.

Track listing
No.	Title	Lyrics	Singer(s)	Length
1.	"Hero Naan"	Roju	Milidhane Dinesh	4:37
2.	"Thaaye"	Mukundan Raman	Karthika Vaidyanathan	3:03
3.	"Aasai Enbadhu"	Roju	Karthika Vaidyanathan, Satish Raghunathan	2:13
4.	"Thaaye Unleashed"	Mukundan Raman, Roju	Karthika Vaidyanathan	2:36
5.	"Kadavulaaga Maarinen"	Roju	Satish Raghunathan	3:27
Total length:				15:56

== Episodes ==
No.	Title	Directed by	Written by	Original release date
1	"Once Upon A Time"	Roju	Roju	4 November 2022
2	"The Housewife Who hates Love"	Roju	Roju	4 November 2022
3	"The Head of the Family"	Roju	Roju	4 November 2022
4	"The hunter"	Roju	Roju	4 November 2022
5	"The Bookworm"	Roju	Roju	4 November 2022
6	"The Widow"	Roju	Roju	4 November 2022
7	"The Devotee"	Roju	Roju	4 November 2022
8	"The End to A New beginning"	Roju	Roju	4 November 2022

== Release ==
The series was released at SonyLIV on 4 November 2022.
