= Mammatiyaan Stars =

- Genre: Sports; Drama
- Written by: Savir Sudhakar; Naveen Rajkumar; Kalai Selvan; Vinu Karthikeyan
- Directed by: Savir Sudhakar
- Starring: Vaibhav Murugesan; Lavanya Anbazhagan; Venkeda Balamurali; Jagabar Sathik; Naan Kadavul Rajendran; Vivek Prasanna
- Country of origin: India
- No. of episodes: 6

Production
- Producer: Singaravelan
- Cinematography: PM Rajkumar
- Production company: SS Group

Original release
- Network: ZEE5
- Release: 26 June 2026

Mammatiyaan Stars is a 2026 Indian Tamil-language sports drama web series directed by Savir Sudhakar. It stars Vaibhav Murugesan, Lavanya Anbazhagan, Venkeda Balamurali and Jagabar Sathik, and follows a group of cricket fans from a Tamil Nadu village who travel to Chennai hoping to watch a star player's final match. Produced by S. Singaravelan under the SS Group banner, the six-episode series premiered on ZEE5 on 26 June 2026.

== Premise ==
The series follows Chinna and his friends Shakil and Siva, three college students in a small Tamil Nadu village whose shared interest is cricket and a player they have followed since childhood. Learning that the player is nearing retirement, the group enters local cricket tournaments to raise money for a trip to see him play in Chennai before his final match. Joined by a fourth friend, Charu, they travel toward the city, and their plan is complicated when they discover the match tickets they bought are counterfeit.

== Cast ==
- Vaibhav Murugesan as Chinna
- Lavanya Anbazhagan as Charu
- Venkeda Balamurali as Shakil
- Jagabar Sathik as Siva
- Naan Kadavul Rajendran as Veerapandi
- Vivek Prasanna as Abdul Bhaai
- Sampath Ram as Periya Settu
- Sarathravi as Warden

== Production ==
Mammatiyaan Stars was directed by Savir Sudhakar, who also co-wrote the series with Naveen Rajkumar, Kalai Selvan and Vinu Karthikeyan. It was produced by Singaravelan under the SS Group banner. Cinematography was by PM Rajkumar, with editing by Pavithran and art direction by Tamilselvan.

== Reception ==
Rakesh Tara of ABP Live gave the series a generally positive review, noting that "Overall, Mammatiyaan Stars is not a thriller with big twists and turns. But it can be seen as a light-hearted feel-good web series that tells the story of friendship, cricket craze and youthful dreams in a simple way. This series will not disappoint cricket fans and those who like stories centered around friends."

Deepa of BroadCast Media provided a more critical assessment, She remarked that "Cricket fans may connect with the characters’ passion for the game, but others may feel like they are watching a match that is still waiting for its first six. The series has a simple concept, but it misses the chance to turn that idea into a memorable innings."
