= Gulu Gulu =

- Release poster
- Directed by: Rathna Kumar
- Written by: Rathna Kumar
- Produced by: S. Raj Narayanan
- Starring: Santhanam; Namita Krishnamurthy
- Cinematography: Vijay Kartik Kannan
- Edited by: Philomin Raj
- Music by: Santhosh Narayanan
- Production company: Circle Box Entertainment
- Distributed by: Red Giant Movies
- Release date: 29 July 2022
- Running time: 149 minutes
- Country: India
- Language: Tamil

Gulu Gulu is a 2022 Indian Tamil-language road action comedy film written and directed by Rathna Kumar and produced by Raj Narayanan's banner Circle Box Entertainment. The film was distributed by Udhayanidhi Stalin under his banner Red Giant Movies. The film stars Santhanam and Namita Krishnamurthy. The music is composed by Santhosh Narayanan with cinematography handled by Vijay Kartik Kannan and editing by Philomin Raj. The film was released theatrically on 29 July 2022 to mixed reviews from critics.

== Plot ==
Google alias Gulu Gulu does every odd job for survival. He is approached for help by a group of youngsters who want to rescue one of their friends from a kidnapping. But that kidnapping had happened due to mistaken identity.

== Cast ==
- Santhanam as Google aka Gulu Gulu/Mario
- Namita Krishnamurthy as Vadivukarasi
- Athulya Chandra as Matilda Christopher
- Pradeep Rawat as David
- George Maryan as a kidnapper
- Sai Dheena as Inspector Varadhan
- Bipin as Robert
- Harish Kumar as Mathimaaran
- Kavi Sundaram as Kumar, Mathi's friend
- Yuvaraj as Rajkumar, Mathi's friend
- Maurish Dass as Bhavani Shankar, Mathi's friend
- Mahanadi Shankar
- Lollu Sabha Maaran as a drunkard
- Lollu Sabha Seshu as the neighbour
- TSR Srinivasan as Lankaiyan
- Jeeva Subramanian

== Production ==
The shooting of the film was wrapped up in April 2022. The film features Santhanam in a more serious and mature role, the first in his career, with the humor elements handled by his costars.

== Music ==
The film's soundtrack was composed by Santhosh Narayanan while lyrics are written by Vivek, Asal Kolaar, and Rathna Kumar.

Track listing
No.	Title	Lyrics	Singer(s)	Length
1.	"Maatna Gaali"	Rathna Kumar	Santhosh Narayanan	3:25
2.	"Anbarey"	Vivek	Dhee	3:46
3.	"Inner Peace"	Asal Kolaar	Santhosh Narayanan	3:19
4.	"Amma Nah Nah"	Rathna Kumar	Santhosh Narayanan	2:09

== Release ==
The film had its theatrical release on 29 July 2022. The Tamil Nadu distribution rights of the film was bought by Red Giant Movies. The film satellite and digital has acquired by Sun TV and Sun NXT. The television premier took place on Sunday 2 October 2022 for Gandhi Jayanthi at 3:00pm.

== Reception ==
Gulu Gulu received mixed reviews from critics.

Lokesh Balachandran of The Times of India gave the film 2.5 out of 5 stars and wrote "The one-liners of Lollu Sabha Maaran and performance of Mariyam George, who plays one of the kidnappers keeps the audience engaged then and there. Gulu Gulu has all elements to become a good film but Rathnakumar misses out on something similar to the search engines on internet." Srinivasa Ramanujam of The Hindu wrote "Director Rathna Kumar, who made Meyadha Maan and Aadai earlier and has contributed to Lokesh Kanagaraj's projects as well, has taken a new path with Gulu Gulu. While that is appreciable, the result isn't exactly the laugh riot that it ought to have been, thanks to the writing being all over the place. They named their lead character Google, but did not search enough for a coherent screenplay." Ranjani Krishnakumar of News9Live gave the film 5 out of 5 stars and stated "Gulu Gulu never weighs you down with its melancholy but never lets you relax in its humour either. Rathna Kumar packs the film with existential dread, the underlying horror of it never once losing its depth in the cloak of dark comedy it wears. In that sense, it's an almost tough film to watch, it's certainly not intended as a regular film — a relief from real life. It is a complex, imperfect, sometimes restless ode to its cruelty of it."

However, OTTplay critic gave 2.5 stars out of 5 and noted that "A black comedy let down by inconsistent writing.". Sudhir Srinivasan of Cinema Express stated that " The problem with Gulu Gulu isn’t one of ideology" and gave 2 stars out of stars.
