= Triples (TV series) =

Indian web series

- Poster of the Web series
- Genre: Romantic comedy
- Written by: Balaji Jayaraman
- Directed by: Charukesh Sekar
- Starring: Jai; Vani Bhojan
- Composer: Vishal Chandrashekhar
- Country of origin: India
- Original language: Tamil
- No. of seasons: 1
- No. of episodes: 8

Production
- Producer: Karthik Subbaraj
- Production location: India
- Cinematography: Kalaiselvan Sivaji
- Editor: Prasanna G. K.
- Running time: 22-30 min
- Production company: Stone Bench Creations

Original release
- Network: Disney+ Hotstar
- Release: 11 December 2020

Triples is an Indian Tamil-language romantic comedy television series for Hotstar Specials produced by Karthik Subbaraj under his Stone Bench Creations, with the script being written by Balaji Jayaraman and directed by Charukesh Sekar. The series stars Jai and Vani Bhojan in the lead role. while Rajkumar, Vivek Prasanna, Madhuri Jain and Namita Krishnamurthy in the supporting role. It was released through Disney+ Hotstar on 11 December 2020.

== Plot ==
Three friends set out to Goa to deal with a major problem that threatens to ruin their business, and lives. A loan shark, a politician who is on the lookout for his daughter, an ex-wife and a current girlfriend make their journey adventurous.

== Cast ==
- Jai as Ram Kumar
- Vani Bhojan as Meera, Ram's ex-wife (Voice Dubbed By Renuka Kathir)
- Vivek Prasanna as Maadhavan Raamamirtham Maadhu, Ram's close friend and partner
- Namita Krishnamurthy as Janaki Maadhavan, Maadhu's wife
- Rajkumar as Cheenu, Ramu's close friend and partner.
- Madhuri Jain as Mythili, Ram's fiancée
- A. Venkatesh as Councillor Chelladurai
- Manikandan R. Achari as Baby Chetta
- Ashik Rahman as Mukesh.
- Deepthi as Swapna
- Benito Franklin Alex as ACP Aakash
- Pradeep K Vijayan as Alphonse De Angusamy
- Niveda Baddula as Shilpa
- Padmini Jagadeesh as Padmini Aunty / Diaper Aunty
- Meena Vemuri as Fertility Doctor
- Kavithalaya Krishnan as Doctor
- Pillayar Ruthru as Chelladurai's assistant

== Episodes ==
No.	Title	Directed by	Written by	Original release date
1	"The Wedding Guest"	Charukesh Sekar	Balaji	11 December 2020
It's Ram's wedding, but he looks unhappy. Flash back a few years, and he has just opened a café in an IT firm with his two besties. A new venture, but there's new love too.
2	"Ex Factor"	Charukesh Sekar	Balaji	11 December 2020
Meera, a blast from Ram's very recent past, makes a comeback with news to share. When Maadhu and Cheenu doubt her intentions, she reveals why they divorced.
3	"The Wedding Crashers"	Charukesh Sekar	Balaji	11 December 2020
After hearing Meera's news, Maadhu, Cheenu and Janaki try everything to stop the wedding. Finally, Janaki gets a brainwave.
4	"Gone in 60 Seconds"	Charukesh Sekar	Balaji	11 December 2020
Ram is all set to do the unthinkable, giving Maadhu and Cheenu quite a scare. Meanwhile, Swapna and Mukesh elope along with something that doesn't belong to them.
5	"Mad Max Mylapore"	Charukesh Sekar	Balaji	11 December 2020
Swapna's angry politician father and Baby Chetta's henchmen chase the trio all over Mylapore. Once they are able to take a breather, the three stumble upon a lead.
6	"Go Goa Gone"	Charukesh Sekar	Balaji	11 December 2020
The Triples land in Goa, and the thieving lovebirds are right there but so is Baby Chetta. To top it all, they have to deal with unwanted guests.
7	"Hide & Seek"	Charukesh Sekar	Balaji	11 December 2020
The situation worsens as Chelladurai also finds the hotel and a drunk Cheenu gets loose-lipped with Mythili. If that wasn't enough, Ram gets an ominous phone call.
8	"All Is Well"	Charukesh Sekar	Balaji	11 December 2020
In order to save Mukesh, Swapna strikes a deal with Baby. While that's going on, Ram, Meera and Janaki set in motion a plan to rescue their friends.

== Production ==
Producer Karthik Subbaraj and director Charukesh Sekar noted that the show was written to match Crazy Mohan's style of writing, stating that "Growing up, we have all been fans of Crazy Mohan sir. When I was pitched the idea, I thought it was funny and interesting because it had good humour and romance quotient as well". Two of the characters in the show — Vivek Prasanna and Rajkumar — were named as Madhu and Cheenu, a reference to Mohan's theatre sketches. Charukesh stated that the two characters are Mohan's iconic creations, further adding that "When the show's writer (Balaji) narrated these characters to me, I was sold. The show plays out like a comedy of errors and has lots of wordplay, just like in the style of Crazy Mohan".

== Soundtrack ==
Triples

Soundtrack album by Vishal Chandrashekhar and Jai
- Released: 4 December 2020
- Recorded: 2020
- Genre: Soundtrack
- Language: Tamil
- Label: Disney+ Hotstar
- Producer: Vishal Chandrashekhar

The soundtrack album is composed by Vishal Chandrashekhar and Jai, with the former also working in the production of the film's music and background score. The series feature two songs which were released individually on 4 December 2020. The series mark Jai's debut as a composer, who worked in one song from the album.

Track list
No.	Title	Lyrics	Music	Singer(s)	Length
1.	"Nee En Kannadi"	Charukesh Sekar	Vishal Chandrashekhar	Govind Prasad, Sinduri Vishal	3:21
2.	"Uyir Unnodu Serumo"	Archana Sabeshh	Jai	Bobo Shashi	3:09

== Release ==
On 23 October 2020, Disney+ Hotstar announced four Tamil original web series for Hotstar Specials with Triples being one of them, and its teaser was released as a part of the promotional purposes the same day. The official trailer was released on 30 November 2020. The series released through Disney+ Hotstar on 11 December 2020 in Tamil along with Telugu, Malayalam, Marathi, Kannada, Bengali and Hindi dubbed languages.

== Reception ==
V. Lakshmi of The Times of India gave 3 out of 5 and stated "Triples does manage to take you on a joyful, yet bumpy ride, despite its hurried writing and a few rutted sequences notwithstanding." Srinivasa Ramanujam of The Hindu wrote "Triples’ arrives at a time when there's a lot of comedy options for the average Tamil viewer. There are Vadivelu/Vivek scenes galore to re-visit, and other recent aspiring players who are creating quite a mark in the online space. That it manages to leave a mark despite all that means something, and that surely augurs well for the larger Tamil comic space." Behindwoods gave 2.5 out of 5 and stated "Despite the humour working only in parts, Triples is a watchable web-series."

Manoj Kumar R. of The Indian Express gave a mixed review writing "We get the Crazy Mohan-style comedy only in terms of names of the characters. There aren't enough clever wordplays, puns and laugh-out-loud moments to encourage us to overlook other problems."

Ranjani Krishnakumar of Firstpost panned the show stating "The biggest shame with Triples is that it had potential. A sharper commentary on the world and a cleverer dialogue writer could have made Triples an absolute delight of a show." Sudhir Srinivasan of Cinema Express gave a rating of 1.5 out of 5 and wrote "This web-series never amounts to anything more than mundane chatter between cardboard characters."
