= Aadai =

2019 Indian film by Rathna Kumar

- Theatrical release poster
- Directed by: Rathna Kumar
- Written by: Rathna Kumar
- Produced by: Viji Subramaniyan
- Starring: Amala Paul; Vivek Prasanna; Ramya Subramanian
- Cinematography: Vijay Kartik Kannan
- Edited by: Shafique Mohamed Ali
- Music by: Pradeep Kumar; Oorka
- Production company: SK Studios
- Distributed by: Srii Umayal Films
- Release date: 19 July 2019
- Running time: 141 minutes
- Country: India
- Language: Tamil

Aadai (transl. Dress) is a 2019 Indian Tamil-language thriller film written and directed by Rathna Kumar, and produced by V Studios. The film stars Amala Paul in the lead role alongside Ananya Ramaprasad, Vivek Prasanna, and Ramya Subramanian. Pradeep Kumar composed the film's soundtrack alongside the Oorka band, who made their debut with this film. The cinematography and editing were handled by Vijay Kartik Kannan and Shafique Mohamed Ali, respectively. The film was released on 19 July 2019.

== Plot ==
Kamini is an anchorwoman who is extremely spontaneous, courageous, and has a strong sense of feminism. She is shown to have no understanding of the dynamics between ideology and freedom. She was raised by her mother after her father's death when she was young. Due to her mother's conservative values, Kamini and her mother are often at odds regarding her attitude. Kamini works with her friend Jennifer and a few others as a team at the #tag channel. For the past three years, they have been known for doing serious pranks (such as murder attempts and medical emergencies) on unsuspecting people to go viral on social media.

On her birthday, Kamini's mother challenges her to try to be a serious newsreader at least once so that she can be happy, but Kamini refuses. Kamini's birthday is also the same day as the last day the news channel will be occupying their current building before moving to a new premise far away. As part of a sentimental goodbye, the last broadcast from the old building is a live newsfeed to be done by Jennifer. While Kamini visits Jennifer as she gets ready, Kamini remembers what her mother said earlier, and a challenge about news reading forms in her mind. However, Jennifer goes missing 10 minutes before the live feed, and, with no way out, Kamini serves as a replacement newsreader. Despite everyone's expectation, Kamini does well in the news reading, and Jennifer is shown to safely come out of the upper floor toilet, whose door got stuck. The firm vacates the building, and the empty building is left unlocked for the weekend.

In the evening, Kamini and her friends celebrate her birthday with drinks and food mixed with magic mushrooms in their empty office building. While on a call with her mother, Kamini unwittingly reveals that she was the one who locked Jennifer so that she could prove her point. Jennifer fights with Kamini and challenges her to read the news naked. Kamini begins to strip as everyone gets high because of the magic mushrooms.

The next day, Kamini wakes up to an empty office without her phone. Her clothes have disappeared, and she spends the day naked, trying to get help in insensible ways. She gets hold of her phone, but with almost no battery power, she fails to make any outgoing calls. She manages to make a food order on a toll-free number and then waits. Kamini arms herself with an iron pipe to attack the delivery man and obtain his clothes but is surprised to see a delivery woman, who then suddenly faints from blood loss. Kamini then tries to remove her clothes, but the delivery girl wakes up and restrains her, so Kamini hits her on the head with the pipe and scampers off to the sound of two locals entering the building. The locals find the delivery girl and call the police, thinking that she is dead. Kamini manages to hide from them and the police, who, upon arriving, resuscitate the girl.

After the police leaves, Kamini is left alone, now locked in the building. She gets a call from her friend Sukumar, who reveals that they were arrested by the police the previous night since they were high. But before Kamini can say anything, her phone runs out of battery. Meanwhile, Kamini's mother files a report about her missing daughter in the same police station where her friends are jailed.

Kamini breaks the entrance's glass window in an attempt to unlock the door, injuring her arm from the shattered glass. Succeeding, she ventures out into the night. She finds a garbage bin outside but is chased by dogs before she can find anything to cover herself. She runs back into the building, still pursued by dogs. She falls down and again injures herself on the broken glass before locking herself in the toilet, and, feeling hopeless, begins to cry. She reminds herself about her fearless nature and the promises to her mother about coming out of the office building with her dignity intact. She then uses a roll of toilet paper to cover her breasts and genitals and exits the building to find herself stranded in the rain. Seeing police tape, she covers herself with it and begs a passerby to help her by providing their raincoat. The passerby instead gives her a bag with Kamini's original clothes, leaving her puzzled. She puts on the clothes and starts to chase the passerby until they get startled by a passing police van coming inside the office building gate. It is revealed that the passerby is the same delivery girl who Kamini attacked earlier; she reveals she is the reason for Kamini's naked misery. They start fighting, and Kamini starts pulling the girl's clothes for revenge. Kamini is then suddenly struck by a flashback.

The delivery girl, Nangeli, was a civil service aspirant from a tribal village in the Manjolai Hills and had passed the UPSC preliminary examination two years previously. She was sent to Chennai by her family for the UPSC Mains Examination. While waiting for an auto, Kamini's friends played a medically oriented prank on Nangeli, causing her to miss out on her examination and waste her preliminary. When Nangeli's mother came to Chennai for the following year's examination, she fainted, and no one came to help, thinking it was another prank. Nangeli is forced to work as a delivery girl while preparing for the exam again when she suddenly sees Kamini one day after delivering food to her office and sees her enjoying life.

Resentful, Nangeli sought revenge. She followed Kamini, seeing her and her friends having fun in the empty office building. She hears Kamini telling her friends that she can stay naked in the building for a day. She sees Kamini walking to the restroom, hears her friends leaving to get more drinks, and then enters the building to find both Kamini and Jennifer passed out in the bathroom. Nangeli uses Jennifer's mobile phone to call Jennifer's father, asking him to pick her up because she is too drunk to get home. After Jennifer is taken away, Nangeli cleans the entire office to get rid of everything. She then removes Kamini's garments before hiding them in an air vent. When Kamini woke up naked, Nangeli keeps a close watch on her. She hears Kamini order food, runs out to pay the delivery boy, and pretends to be the delivery boy.

Before Kamini woke up, Nangeli donated blood at a blood donation bus passing by. On entering the office, she pranks Kamini by fainting to see whether Kamini offers help. Instead, Kamini hits her on the head. Nangeli reveals how social media has created a dangerous world where a selfie or even pranks can be fatal, leading Kamini to ask if it is her show's fault that everyone in the world is crazy about social media. Nangeli points out that while everyone has the freedom to do what they want, but it should not be misused; this causes Kamini to realise her mistake. Nangeli reveals she did not want to take revenge but just wanted her to know how much misery Kamini had caused. She explains how, despite Kamini hurting her, she ran away from the hospital and the cops outside to see if she was safe. She also thought Kamini, being a free-spirited female, would walk out of the office naked without shame. Instead, she revealed that she is not shameless. Nangeli is also upset seeing how Kamini is injured from stepping on glass and running from the dogs. She apologises to Kamini, and the two part ways. Kamini changes from public pranks to exposing scandals of politicians in the office with her colleagues. She is shown to be the cause for the dismissal and arrest of a songwriter who was a member of parliament. As the film ends, Nangeli is shown to still be preparing for her exams while working as a delivery person.

== Cast ==
- Amala Paul as Sudhandhira Kodi/Kamini
- Ananya Ramaprasad as Nangeli/Food Delivery Girl
- Vivek Prasanna as Gowri
- Ramya Subramanian as Jennifer
- Sarithiran as Sukumar
- Rohit Nandakumar as Akash
- Kishore Dev as Deepak
- Sriranjani as Lakshmi, Kamini's mother
- T. M. Karthik as Senthil (Senz Sir)
- TSR Srinivasan
- Bijili Ramesh as Police Officer
- Uma Padmanabhan
- Karuppu Nambiar as Police Inspector
- Aruvi Bala
- Citizen Mani as Madhavan Nair
- Gopi Gpr

Archana Chandhoke provides the voiceover at the beginning of the film.

== Production ==
Amala Paul said in an interview that director gave her the option of wearing a special outfit in the nude scenes, but she said she chose to perform the scenes fully nude in front of the 15-person crew even though none of the nudity would be shown on screen; some viewers had pointed out that when looking closely in some scenes it is obvious she did wear skin-coloured clothing. She had reportedly been on set filming for the film as of 20 November 2018.

== Release and reception ==
Aadai was released on 19 July 2019. Thinkal Menon of The Times of India rated the film 3.5 out of 5 stars, writing, "The intense making of the movie coupled with the actress' convincing performance provide ample edge-of-the-seat moments", concluding that Aadai was "a compelling watch which breaks a few stereotypes and offers an engaging experience". Pradeep Kumar of The Hindu called the plot weak and added, "Amala Paul usurps everyone and everything, which is great, but is also eerily similar to the manner how heroes overshadow everything in their film. This is not a criticism. It is a worry". Baradwaj Rangan, writing for Film Companion, also criticised the plot but lauded Amala Paul's performance.
