= Bench Talkies =

2015 Tamil language independent anthology film

- Theatrical release poster
- Directed by: Karthik Subbaraj; Anil Krishnan; Gopakumar; Charukesh Sekar; Monesh; Rathna Kumar
- Screenplay by: Murugaprakash Ganeshan; Gopakumar; Abilash Warrier; Prince; Monesh; Manikandan
- Story by: Karthik Subbaraj
- Produced by: Kaarthekeyen Santhanam; Kalyan Subramanian
- Starring: Vijay Sethupathi; Rishikanth; Guru Somasundaram; Sananth; Vijaymuthu; Aravinnd Singh; Harish; Sharathkumar
- Cinematography: Saleem Bilal; Shreyaas Krishna; Vijay Kartik Kannan; Manikandan
- Edited by: Nanda Kumar; Anil Krishnan; Akbar Basha; Sridharan G. K. Alphonse Puthren
- Music by: Umashankar; Vishal S. Saran Raghavan; Javed Riaz; Rajesh Murugesan
- Production company: Stone Bench Creations
- Release date: 6 March 2015
- Running time: 116 minutes
- Country: India
- Language: Tamil

Bench Talkies is a 2015 Indian Tamil-language independent anthology film consisting of six short films directed by Karthik Subbaraj, Anil Krishnan, Gopakumar, Charukesh Sekar, Monesh and Rathna Kumar. The film was produced by Karthik's newly formed production house Stone Bench Creations and features an ensemble cast including Vijay Sethupathi, Guru Somasundaram, Sananth and Rishikanth. The film was released on 6 March 2015.

== Plot ==
Bench Talkies is a collection of six short films directed by six different directors, which will make you travel through different genres, emotions and experiences.

- Agavizhi by Gopakumar
- Madhu by Rathna Kumar
- Nallathor Veenai by Monesh
- Neer by Karthik Subbaraj
- Puzhu by Charukesh Sekar
- The Lost Paradise by Anil Krishnan

== Cast ==
The Lost Paradise	Agavizhi	Puzhu
Guru Somasundaram as David; Yokshana; Vithusha; Banu; Ananthan Lakshmi	Aravinnd Singh as Anjan; Nisha Krishnan as Zara; Anukush Agarwal as Siddharth; Sandeep Menon as Boss	Sarath Kumar; Rishikanth
Nalladhor Veenai	Madhu	Neer
Harish as Karthi; Prince Ranson Jonase as Tuition Teacher; Saran Raghavan as Raghavan	Sananth as Kumar; Vivek Prasanna as Vinodh; Vignesh as Kishore; Deepak Paramesh as Amit Krishnan; Roshini Abraham as Madhumitha	Vijay Sethupathi as Mahesh; Vijayamuthu as Selva; Ravishankar as Siluvai

== Production ==
Karthik Subburaj, wanting his short films to be widely seen, had approached several theatres asking to screen them during feature film intervals, but was rebuffed. He later saw anthology films like Kerala Cafe (2009), 5 Sundarikal and Bombay Talkies (both 2013) which compiled various short films and was inspired to create one himself which became Bench Talkies. Over 2000 short films were submitted to Bench Flix, a website owned by Karthik where short films are uploaded for distribution, and a judge panel filtered it down to around 35, from which they chose the final six to feature in the film.

== Release ==
The film was released on 6 March 2015 in Chennai, and in Bengaluru on 13 April 2015.

== Reception ==
M. Suganth of The Times of India rated the film 3 out of 5, stating that "The compilation of six films from six filmmakers in different genres makes it an entertaining experience." Baradwaj Rangan wrote for The Hindu, "The key word is amateur, so it won't help to go in expecting professional-grade acting or craft. What we can (must) do is see how these films fare in purely directorial terms." S. Saraswathi of Rediff.com gave 2 out of 5 stars stating "Bench Talkies is a very ordinary collection of short films. They fail to impress, leaving you with a sense of dissatisfaction."
