= Sananth =

Indian actor

- Born: Chennai, Tamil Nadu, India
- Occupation: Actor
- Years active: 2015–present

Sananth (born 6 September) is an Indian actor who has worked in the Tamil cinema. After initially appearing in several short films, Sananth made his feature film debut in Ajay Gnanamuthu's Demonte Colony (2015). Since then he has been a constant fixture in Karthik Subbaraj's films.

== Career ==
Sananth played one of the lead characters in the feature horror film Demonte Colony.

Sananth then made a breakthrough as a lead actor by featuring in Karthik Subbaraj's silent horror thriller Mercury (2018), where he worked alongside actors Prabhu Deva and Indhuja Ravichandran.

In 2019, he collaborated again with Karthik in Petta, which marked Sananth's most high-profile role to that point. Featuring in an ensemble cast alongside Rajinikanth, Vijay Sethupathi and Nawazuddin Siddiqui, Sananth played the role of the college student Anwar who is guarded by Rajinikanth's titular character. The film opened to mixed-to-positive reviews from critics and became a financial success at the box office.

In 2022, he made his third collaboration with Karthik Subbaraj in Mahaan, in which he had an important role. The film features Vikram, Dhruv Vikram and some actors from the casting of Petta like Bobby Simha, Simran, Aadukalam Naren and Ramachandran Durairaj. The film was released in Amazon Prime Video to generally positive reviews.

In 2026, he played significant roles in the films Neelira, and starred in Heartin. He also played a lead role in Dorothy, receiving rave reviews and critical acclaim for his performance.

== Filmography ==
=== Film ===
Year	Title	Role	Notes	Ref.
2015	Bench Talkies	Kumar	Segment: "Madhu"	
2015	Demonte Colony	Raghavan		
2016	Jil Jung Juk	Jaguar Jagan (Juk)		
2018	Mercury	Michael		
2019	Petta	Anwar		
2022	Mahaan	Rakesh "Rocky" Christopher		
2023	Jigarthanda DoubleX	Audience member	Uncredited cameo	
2026	Neelira	Castro / Devan		
2026	Heartin	Shiva		
2026	Dorothy	Subbu		

=== Television ===
Year	Title	Role	Notes	Ref.
2017	As I'm Suffering From Kadhal	Badri	9 episodes	
2021	Navarasa	Cheran	Segment: "Peace"	
2022	Putham Pudhu Kaalai Vidiyaadhaa	Arjun	Segment: "The Mask"	
