= Indhuja Ravichandran =

Indian actress (born 1994)

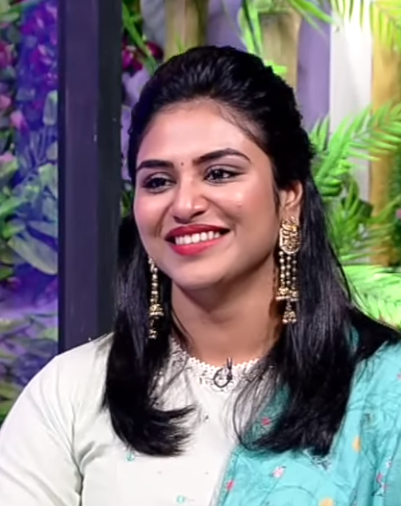
- Indhuja in 2019
- Born: 1 August 1994 (age 32); Vellore, Tamil Nadu, India
- Education: Vellore Institute of Technology
- Occupations: Actress; model
- Years active: 2017–present

Indhuja Ravichandran is an Indian actress who appears in Tamil films. She is known for her works in Meyaadha Maan (2017), Mercury (2018), 60 Vayadu Maaniram (2018), Bigil (2019) and Parking (2023).

== Biography ==
Indhuja Ravichandran was born and brought up in Vellore and pursued her schooling in SeventhDay Adventist Mat. Hr. Sec. School Vellore. She received a degree in Software Engineering from Vellore Institute of Technology. While pursuing her degree, she did several modeling assignments, auditioned for different roles, and did several short films both internally within the college and outside the college for different college fests. She was spotted by Karthik Subburaj during her audition and eventually made her film debut with Meyaadha Maan, where she played Vaibhav's sister. M. Suganth, in a review of the film on the Times of India, stated that she made "a very impressive debut". In 2019, she starred in Bigil where she played a female soccer player.

== Filmography ==
=== Films ===
Key
†	Denotes films that have not yet been released

Year	Title	Role	Notes
2017	Meyaadha Maan	Sudar Vizhi	
2018	Mercury	Meera	Silent Film
2018	60 Vayadu Maaniram	Dr. Archana	
2018	Billa Pandi	Jaya Lakshmi	
2019	Boomerang	Maya	
2019	Magamuni	Vijaya Lakshmi "Viji"	
2019	Super Duper	Sherin	
2019	Bigil	Vembu	
2020	Mookuthi Amman	Bride	Cameo Appearance
2022	Naane Varuvean	Bhuvana	
2023	Parking	Aadhika	

=== Television ===
Year	Title	Role	Channel	Notes	Ref
2023	Bigg Boss Tamil (Season 7)	Guest	Vijay TV	Parking movie promotion	

=== Web series ===
Year	Title	Role	Platform	Notes
2019	Thiravam	Sahana	ZEE5	

=== Short film ===
- Magavu

== Awards ==
Year	Film	Award	Category	Result	Ref.
2017	Meyaadha Maan	Ananda Vikatan Cinema Awards	Best Supporting Actress	Won	
2017	Meyaadha Maan	Vijay Awards	Best Supporting Actress	Nominated	
2017	Meyaadha Maan	7th South Indian International Movie Awards	Best Supporting Actress	Nominated	
2019	Magamuni	9th South Indian International Movie Awards	Best Supporting Actress - Tamil	Won	
2019	Magamuni	Edison Awards	Best Actress	Nominated	
