= Rathna Kumar =

Indian film director and writer

- Born: R. M. Rathna Kumar
- Occupations: Film director, Screenwriter
- Notable work: Meyaadha Maan

Rathna Kumar is an Indian film director and writer. He is known for directing Meyaadha Maan (2017).

== Career ==
Kumar began his career with the low-budget film Madhu, which was included in an anthology film called Bench Talkies. He later turned the short film into a feature film titled Meyaadha Maan (2017). The film turned out to be a success and an important film in Vaibhav's career because the film was not a multistarrer and several of Vaibhav's successful films had only been multistarrers. He went on to direct Aadai (2019), starring Amala Paul. The film released to mixed reviews, but highlighted an important aspect of society. Kumar was signed as a co-writer to Lokesh Kanagaraj's Master (2021) starring Vijay. Regarding his decision of becoming a writer from a director, Kumar told The Times of India that Kanagaraj is his friend. Kumar started working with Lokesh again as a co-writer for Vijay's 67th film titled tentatively as Leo (2023). Then, he directed the romantic drama film titled 29 (2026).

== Filmography ==
- All films are in Tamil, unless otherwise noted.

=== As film director ===
Year	Title	Notes	Ref.
2015	Bench Talkies	Segment: Madhu	
2017	Meyaadha Maan	Nominated, Vijay Award for Best Debut Director; Nominated, Vijay Award for Best Story, Screenplay Writer	
2019	Aadai		
2022	Gulu Gulu		
2026	29		

=== As screenwriter ===
Year	Title	Writer	Notes	Ref.
2021	Master	Dialogues	Cameo appearance as Prisoner.	
2022	Vikram	Dialogues		
2023	Leo	Co-writer		
2026	Sardar 2	Co-writer		
