= Sarpatta Parambarai (soundtrack) =

Soundtrack album by Santhosh Narayanan
- Released: 28 July 2021
- Recorded: 2020–2021
- Studio: Future Tense Studios, Chennai
- Genre: Feature film soundtrack
- Length: 16:53
- Language: Tamil
- Label: Maajja
- Producer: Santhosh Narayanan

Santhosh Narayanan chronology
Jagame Thandhiram (2021)	Sarpatta Parambarai (2021)	Navarasa (2021)

Singles from Sarpatta Parambarai
- 1. "Neeye Oli" Released: 30 June 2021; 2. "Vambula Thumbula" Released: 21 July 2021

Sarpatta Parambarai is the soundtrack album for 2021 film of the same name starring Arya, John Kokken, Shabeer Kallarakkal, Dushara Vijayan, Pasupathy, Anupama Kumar and Sanchana Natarajan. The film, directed and co-produced by Pa. Ranjith, featured musical score composed by Santhosh Narayanan and lyrics written by Kabilan, Arivu, Shan Vincent de Paul and Madras Miran. The soundtrack was released on 28 July 2021 through the independent record label Maajja and preceded by two singles: "Neeye Oli" and "Vambula Thumbula" which featured in the film.

The music was created with instruments from the 1970s and 1980s which was used in order to replicate the time period and fuses Tamil folk and orchestral music. It received acclaim from critics, which was considered as one of the key aspects of the film. Arivu won the Best Lyricist award at the Ananda Vikatan Cinema Awards and Filmfare Awards South for the song "Neeye Oli".

The film was also one of the final collaboration between Ranjith and Santhosh, with the former working with other composers in his directorials.

== Development ==
Sarpatta Parambarai's music and background score is composed by Santhosh Narayanan who renewed his association with Ranjith for the fifth time consecutively. Since the film is based on the North Chennai backdrop as well as the boxing culture in the 1970s and 1980s, Santhosh admitted that the film is influenced by the aspects of his scoring techniques for Madras (2014). To stay authentic to the music of that period, Santhosh chose to bring instruments used in the 1970s, instead of echoing film music from that era. Since, the instruments used in that period were made of skin (contemporary instruments were replaced with fibre), he met veteran gaana musicians such as Rev Ravi and Gana Bala, who still had access to those instruments. For the background score, Santhosh replicated the theme music of The Hateful Eight originally composed by Ennio Morricone, for this film. The album and score is made with the mix of Tamil folk and brass instrument, as he was inspired by the music of Black Panther (2018), which fused African instruments with orchestral music. As the film was shifted to digital release because of the COVID-19 pandemic lockdown, Santhosh had to make several changes in the sound mixing from theatrical mix to stereophonic sound.

The film also featured fewer songs compared to Ranjith and Santhosh's previous collaborations. One of which is a theme song under the title "Neeye Oli", which was originally created by Shan Vincent de Paul in collaboration with Santhosh Narayanan and Arivu, who wrote the Tamil lyrics. Shan, who also sung the track with female rap vocals by Navz-47, has created the song for the studio album Made in Jaffna, which was set to be released by the independent music platform Maajja. de Paul admitted that he felt it easy to be connected with the song as it was reflective of his journey, and had him channelize his inner Muhammad Ali. A separate version was featured in the film, with Santhosh curating another strophe and additional lyrics written by Arivu. Another track for the film is titled "Vambula Thumbula", sung by Santhosh along with Gana Muthu and Isaivani, who were a part of Ranjith's Casteless Collective music band and 'Gana Ulagam' Dharani; the lyrics for this song is written by Kabilan and Madras Meeran.

== Release ==
"Neeye Oli" was released independently as a single on 30 June 2021, and the accompanying music video which unveiled on 16 July, directed by Shan himself with Kalainithan Kalaichelvan as the co-director. The song "Vambula Thumbula" was released as the second single on 21 July. Following popular demand, Santhosh unveiled the theme music for the character Dancing Rose on 28 July 2021.

The soundtrack was released through digital platforms on the same day. Instead of tying with popular music labels, Santhosh released the album through the independent platform Maajja as well as the songs on his own YouTube channel.

== Track listing ==
No.	Title	Lyrics	Artist(s)	Length
1.	"Neeye Oli"	Arivu, Shan Vincent de Paul	Santhosh Narayanan, Navz-47, Shan Vincent de Paul	3:57
2.	"Vambula Thumbula"	Kabilan, Madras Miran	Gana Muthu, Isaivani, Gana Ulagam Dharani, Santhosh Narayanan	5:01
3.	"Neeye Oli" (Film version)	Arivu	Santhosh Narayanan	4:28
4.	"Dancing Rose" (Instrumental)	—	—	3:26
Total length:				16:53

== Reception ==
Many critics were appreciative of Santhosh's music and film score, saying it as one of the key aspects in the film's success. Nandini Ramnath of Scroll.in wrote "Composer Santhosh Narayanan's sonic collage of tense music, the sounds of trains and film music and the cheers of spectators sets the tone for a high-pitched drama delivered at high volume." For the same website, Devarsi Ghosh mentioned "Neeye Oli" has one of the best songs in the 2021 year-ender film music, adding "Coiling around Shan's superb English rap and Arivu's Tamil lyrics rapped by another Tamil-Canadian, Navz-47, are crunchy guitars and majestic horns that create a solid workout song."

M. Suganth of The Times of India described the score "electric". Baradwaj Rangan of Film Companion South praised "Santhosh Narayanan's score is amazing". Prahlad Srihari of The Quint described the score "uplifting". Sify wrote "Santhosh's background score rightly elevates the tension in each boxing game." Sudhir Srinivasan of Cinema Express added that "Santhosh's Neeye Oli is a real force through this film. What a moment when it kicks in for the first time and Kabilan slaps on his gloves. Or how about when the whole track plays to Kabilan's training, and of many lovely shots, you see once again that fantastic one from the trailer: the one where the sea almost parts to show you Kabilan in almost neck-high water, practising his punches… It's the sort of visual imagery theatres are made for."

== Awards and nominations ==
Award	Date of ceremony	Category	Recipient(s) and nominee(s)	Result	Ref.
Ananda Vikatan Cinema Awards	December 2022	Best Lyricist	Arivu – ("Neeye Oli")	Won	
Filmfare Awards South	9 October 2022	Best Lyricist – Tamil	Arivu – ("Neeye Oli")	Won	

== Future ==
Despite being acclaimed for Santhosh's music, the film marked Santhosh's final collaboration with Pa. Ranjith after Arivu's exclusion on the Rolling Stone cover edition for August 2021, who was the lyricist for "Neeye Oli" and "Enjoy Enjaami", which was also co-composed by Santhosh. Ranjith later collaborated with Tenma for the music of Natchathiram Nagargiradhu (2022) and G. V. Prakash Kumar from Thangalaan (2024).

When the sequel Sarpatta Parambarai: Round 2 was announced, Santhosh hinted on reuniting with the director for the film.
