= Dhee (singer) =

Australian singer (born 1998)

- Born: Dheekshitha Venkadeshan; 26 June 1998 (age 28)
- Origin: Sydney
- Genre: Pop
- Occupations: Singer; playback singer
- Instrument: Vocals
- Years active: 2012–present
- Label: Maajja

Dheekshitha Venkadeshan (born 26 June 1998), known professionally as Dhee, is an Australian singer known for her work as a playback singer in Indian cinema. She is best known for her collaborations with her stepfather, Santhosh Narayanan, and her distinctive alto voice. She won the Filmfare Award for Best Singer for "Kaattu Payale", from the 2020 film Soorarai Pottru.

== Early life and career ==
Dhee was born on 26 June 1998 in Jaffna, Sri Lanka to a Sri Lankan Tamil father, Venkadesan, and Meenakshi Iyer, who is a Carnatic musician. Iyer was born in Jaffna, Sri Lanka but relocated to her maternal home in Madurai, India during her childhood due to the Sri Lankan civil war.

Dhee was raised and went to school in Sydney, where her mother had since moved. She is the step daughter of Indian music composer Santhosh Narayanan. Dhee began her playback singing career by performing songs in two of Narayanan's albums, Pizza II: Villa (2013) and Cuckoo (2014), during breaks from her education.

After settling in Chennai, Dhee made her breakthrough by singing "Naan Nee" on Narayanan's album, alongside Shakthisree Gopalan, for Pa. Ranjith's Madras (2014). The pair garnered nominations for Best Female Singer for their performance at the Filmfare Awards and Vijay Awards.

Dhee received critical acclaim for her work in Sudha Kongara's sports drama film, Irudhi Suttru (2016). As the lead singer for Ritika Singh's North Madras-based boxer character in the film, Dhee recorded two solo songs titled "Ey Sandakaara" and "Usuru Narumbuley". Behindwoods.com stated that the first song was "another classic Santhosh [Narayanan] number that gets your attention in no time", while noting, of the latter, that the "pathos song by Dhee is a revelation of sorts". In 2017, Dhee made her debut in Telugu cinema with songs from Kongara's Guru, a remake of the director's own Irudhi Suttru.

Dhee continued working with Narayanan in critically acclaimed albums for films such as Kaala (2018) and Vada Chennai (2018), before collaborating with Yuvan Shankar Raja for the song "Rowdy Baby" in Maari 2 (2018). Singing alongside actor Dhanush, the song garnered viral popularity soon after its release. The track has since gained more than 1.5 billion views on YouTube, making it the highest viewed Tamil music video and one of the most-viewed Indian videos of all time.

Dhee made her debut in independent Tamil pop under the A.R. Rahman-helmed label, Maajja, with "Enjoy Enjaami", featuring Arivu (from The Casteless Collective), on 7 March 2021. The track's production, influenced by Tamil Nadu's Oppari style, and its anti-oppression lyrical sentiment made the song an immediate success, with the music video gaining over 50 million views within weeks of its premiere on YouTube. Produced by Narayanan, it is the first song to be released under Maajja. The success of "Enjoy Enjaami" soon became fraught with controversy about Arivu's perceived sidelining in the song's marketing in favour of Dhee and Narayanan. These debates largely revolved around his status as a 'featured' artist, and were spurred on by his absences from the covers of a Spotify remix by DJ Snake and the August 2021 issue of Rolling Stone India. In August 2022, Dhee responded to the controversy by asserting her record of crediting Arivu, and Narayanan, "every chance [she] got", while Arivu has maintained that the song was written and composed entirely by him.

In the years that followed, Dhee returned to Tamil cinema through musical collaborations with Narayanan and G.V. Prakash Kumar. She worked for the first time with composer Anirudh Ravichander on "Jujubee" for the 2023 hit Jailer, directed by Nelson and starring Ravichander's uncle, Rajinikanth. She made her Malayalam language debut in 2024 with "Viduthal" in Darwin Kuriakose's Anweshippin Kandethum, with music by Narayanan.

During the 2021 promotions for "Enjoy Enjaami", it was announced that Dhee's debut studio album would be produced by Maajja, marking her first English-language release since debuting in the Indian music industry. Dhee's first English language single, "I Wear My Roots Like a Medal", was released in October 2024 without involvement from Maajja. It was composed, written and performed by Dhee, and co-produced with Narayanan and Aditya Ravindran.

In October 2025, she featured on singer-songwriter Ed Sheeran's EP, Play (The Remixes), alongside Narayanan and rapper Hanumankind.

== Discography ==
=== Singles ===
==== As lead artist ====
Title	Year	Peak chart positions	Album
Title	Year	UK Asian	Album
"Enjoy Enjaami" (feat. Arivu, produced by Santhosh Narayanan)	2021	5	Non-album single
"Can't You Stay a Little Longer" (produced by Santhosh Narayanan, Aditya Ravindran)	2024		TBA
"I Wear My Roots Like a Medal" (produced by Santhosh Narayanan, Aditya Ravindran)	2024		TBA
"Ancient Seed" (feat. Tiwa Savage and WondaGurl, produced by Santhosh Narayanan, WondaGurl)	2026		Conscious Planet EP

==== As playback singer ====
Year	Song title	Film	Music director	Notes / Language
2013	"Disco Woman"	Pizza II: Villa	Santhosh Narayanan	
2014	"Enda Mapla"	Cuckoo	Santhosh Narayanan	
2014	"Naan Nee"	Madras	Santhosh Narayanan	co-artist Shakthisree Gopalan; Nominated—Filmfare Award – Tamil; Nominated—Vijay Award for Best Female Playback Singer
2016	"Ey Sandakaara"	Irudhi Suttru	Santhosh Narayanan	Nominated—SIIMA Award
2016	"Usuru Narumbeley"	Irudhi Suttru	Santhosh Narayanan	
2016	"Thoondil Meen"	Kabali	Santhosh Narayanan	
2016	"Dushta"	Iraivi	Santhosh Narayanan	
2017	"Oo Sakkanoda"	Guru	Santhosh Narayanan	Telugu
2017	"Gundelothulalo"	Guru	Santhosh Narayanan	Telugu
2017	"Rathina Katti"	Meyaadha Maan	Santhosh Narayanan	
2018	"Kannamma Kannamma"	Kaala	Santhosh Narayanan	
2018	"Maadila Nikkura Maanutty"	Vada Chennai	Santhosh Narayanan	
2018	"Rowdy Baby"	Maari 2	Yuvan Shankar Raja	
2019	"Vaanil Irul"	Nerkonda Paarvai	Yuvan Shankar Raja	
2019	"Idharkuthaan"	Bigil	A. R. Rahman	
2020	"Yedho Maayam"	Dagaalty	Vijay Narain	Lyrics by Subu
2020	"Manamengum Maaya Oonjal"	Gypsy	Santhosh Narayanan	
2020	"Kaattu Payale"	Soorarai Pottru	G. V. Prakash Kumar	
2020	"Kaatuka Kanule"	Aakasam Nee Haddu Raa	G. V. Prakash Kumar	Telugu version
2020	"Rakita Rakita Rakita"	Jagame Thandhiram	Santhosh Narayanan	
2021	"Uttradheenga Yeppov"	Karnan	Santhosh Narayanan	
2022	"Anbarey"	Gulu Gulu	Santhosh Narayanan	
2023	"Chamkeela Angeelesi"	Dasara	Santhosh Narayanan	Telugu
2023	"Mainaru Vetti Katti"	Dasara	Santhosh Narayanan	Tamil version
2023	"Jujubee"	Jailer	Anirudh Ravichander	
2023	"Maamadura"	Jigarthanda DoubleX	Santhosh Narayanan	
2024	"Kombari Vettapuli"	Captain Miller	G. V. Prakash Kumar	
2024	"Viduthal"	Anweshippin Kandethum	Santhosh Narayanan	Malayalam
2024	"Ta Takkara"	Kalki 2898 AD		Telugu
2024	"Thenkizhakku"	Vaazhai	Santhosh Narayanan	Tamil
2024	"Yennai Izhukkuthadi"	Kadhalikka Neramillai	A. R. Rahman	Tamil
2024	"Nain Matakka"	Baby John	Thaman S	Hindi
2025	"Muththa Mazhai"	Thug Life	A. R. Rahman	Tamil
2026	"Adi Alaye"	Parasakthi	G. V. Prakash Kumar	Tamil
2026	"Singaaraala Seethaakoka"	Parasakthi	G. V. Prakash Kumar	Telugu
