= Made in Jaffna =

2021 studio album by Shan Vincent de Paul

Studio album by Shan Vincent de Paul
- Released: September 6, 2021
- Recorded: 2017–2021
- Venue: Studio MOCA
- Genres: Hip-hop; pop; R&B; EDM
- Length: 12:25
- Label: Maajja
- Producer: Shan Vincent de Paul

Shan Vincent de Paul chronology
Kothu Boys (2020)	Made in Jaffna (2021)

Singles from Made in Jaffna
- 1. "Savage" Released: May 28, 2021; 2. "Neeye Oli" Released: June 30, 2021; 3. "Hard Times" Released: July 9, 2021; 4. "Uyire" Released: July 23, 2021; 5. "After Life" Released: August 13, 2021; 6. "Made in Jaffna" Released: September 1, 2021; 7. "Star Crossed" Released: September 10, 2021

Made in Jaffna is a 14-song studio album curated by the Canadian musician Shan Vincent de Paul, which was released on September 6, 2021. It is Shan's third studio album after Saviors (2017) and Kothu Boys (2020). The album describes identity, perseverance, and reconciliation and learning to embrace the tenets of an outsider juggling multiple identities in a foreign land.

== Background ==
In an interview with the New York-based Flaunt magazine, Paul stated:

Just my journey as an artist up to this point. It really is reflective of my community, of the Tamil community, and our experience of juggling two cultures. The story can be related to a lot of people that have left their homeland and had to juggle two cultures. It's my personal story of growing up in the West and being influenced by hip hop, my family's story of leaving Sri Lanka and dealing with that. It's my most autobiographical piece to date, 4 years in the making. I know it's cliché to say it's my most personal work, but it really is. The most vulnerable I've been on record, I'm super excited to share it.

According to Paul, he called the album his "most personal one" in an interview with Lifestyle Asia. The album is about telling the experiences of he and his family and community coming from Jaffna to Toronto due to the Sri Lankan Civil War and it also comments about the Tamil Eelam experience. He further added that "Tamilians from Sri Lanka are often synonymous with suffering. Here, an artistic renaissance is booming, underlining the redemption and resilience of South Asian communities. Via this album, I want to show others what we are capable of, and we are not about suffering any longer."

== Release ==
When he was announced as being a part of Maajja, an independent platform launched by A. R. Rahman, he created two independent songs for the project management, one of them being the independent single "Amnesia" and this studio album. Paul decided to release 12 singles out of the 14-track album which was scheduled for release on August 11, 2021, but was launched on September 6, 2021. One of his earlier released singles "One Hundred Thousand Flowers" and "Heaven" will also be featured in the album. The first single being titled "Savage" was unveiled on May 28, 2021, with the music video being released on the same day and received overwhelmingly positive response for its picturization and composition. The second single "Neeye Oli" co-written by Arivu and composed by Santhosh Narayanan was unveiled on June 30, 2021. The track was Narayanan's second collaboration with the platform and also his second independent single after "Enjoy Enjaami", being used as a theme song for the Pa. Ranjith-directed film Sarpatta Parambarai (2021). The tracks – "Hard Times", "Uyire" and "After Life" – were launched as singles on 9, July 23 and August 13. Five days, before the album launch, on September 1, 2021, the title track "Made in Jaffna" was released and received positive response. According to Paul, the track is "a scorching tale of personal growth and resilience".

== Track listing ==
No.	Title	Lyrics	Artist(s)	Length
1.	"Made in Jaffna"	Shan Vincent de Paul, Robert Benvegnu	De Paul, La+ch	4:16
2.	"Days Like This"	De Paul, Benvegnu	De Paul, La+ch	2:40
3.	"Afterlife"	Coleman Hell, Pritt, Benvegnu, Sangeeth Varman, De Paul	Hell, Pritt, De Paul	3:18
4.	"Hard Times"	Benvegnu, De Paul, Tika Simone	De Paul, Simone	2:21
5.	"Savage"	De Paul	De Paul	2:21
6.	"Creep Slow"	Kirishan Suresh, Benvegnu, De Paul, Shehzeb Iftakhar	La+ch, De Paul, Two's a Company	2:53
7.	"One Hundred Thousand Flowers"	De Paul, Yanchan Rajmohan, Benvegnu	De Paul	2:51
8.	"Neeye Oli"	Arivu, De Paul	De Paul, Navz-47, Santhosh Narayanan	3:57
9.	"Hangin' on"	Arjun Palarajah, De Paul, Yanchan Rajmohan	De Paul, Rajmohan	2:58
10.	"Star Crossed"	De Paul, Benvegnu	De Paul, La+ch	2:04
11.	"Uyire"	De Paul, Rajmohan, Sujeev Thiruketheeswaran	De Paul, Rajmohan	2:18
12.	"Heaven"	Naveeni Athanosious, envegnu	De Paul, Navz-47	3:16
13.	"Seeds"	De Paul, Benvegnu, Sid Sriram	De Paul, La+ch, Sriram	3:47
14.	"Die Iconic 2"	De Paul, Benvegnu	De Paul, La+ch	4:02
Total length:				43:07

== Personnel ==
- Shan Vincent de Paul – vocals (all tracks), composer (all tracks), producer (all tracks), lyricist (tracks 1,2,3), audio mixing (tracks 1,3,4)
- Santhosh Narayanan – composer (track 2), producer (track 2), playback singer (track 2), sound engineer (Future Tense Studios, Chennai) [track 2]
- Navz-47 – playback singer (tracks 2,4)
- Pritt – vocals (track 3)
- Arivu – lyricist (track 2)
- Yanchan Rajmohan – lyricist (track 2)
- Rob Benvegnu – lyricist (tracks 2,3)
- Naveeni Athanosious – lyricist (track 3)
- RK Sundar – sound engineer (Future Tense Studios, Chennai) [track 2]
- Sai Shravanam – sound engineer (Resound India, Chennai) [track 2], audio mixing (track 2), mastering (track 2)
- Gurjith Singh – mastering (tracks 1,3,4)
- Meenakshi Santhosh – music co-ordinator (track 2)

== Charts ==
Title	Chart (2021)	Peak position
"Savage"	RMNZ Hot Singles (New Zealand)	15
"Savage"	Billboard Top Triller (Global)	42
"Savage"	Billboard Top Triller (U.S.)	34
"Savage"	United Kingdom Asian Music Chart Top 40	14
"Neeye Oli"	United Kingdom Asian Music Chart Top 40	21
"Neeye Oli"	Billboard Top Triller (Global)	39
