= Buffoon (film) =

2022 Tamil-language film

- Theatrical release poster
- Directed by: Ashok Veerappan
- Written by: Ashok Veerappan
- Produced by: Karthik Subbaraj; Kaarthekeyen Santhanam; Sudhan Sundaram; Jayaram
- Starring: Vaibhav; Anagha; Anthakudi Ilayaraja
- Cinematography: Dinesh Purushothaman
- Edited by: Vetre Krishnan
- Music by: Santhosh Narayanan
- Production companies: Stone Bench Films; Passion Studios
- Distributed by: Sakthi Film Factory
- Release date: 23 September 2022
- Country: India
- Language: Tamil

Buffoon is a 2022 Indian Tamil-language action thriller film written and directed by Ashok Veerappan in his directorial debut. The film stars Vaibhav, Anagha, and Anthakudi Ilayaraja, while Aadukalam Naren and Joju George play supporting roles. The film has songs and score composed by Santhosh Narayanan. The cinematography and editing were handled by Dinesh Purushothaman and Vetre Krishnan, respectively. It was produced by Karthik Subbaraj, Kaarthekeyen Santhanam, Sudhan Sundaram and Jayaram under, Stone Bench Films and Passion Studios. The film was released theatrically on 23 September 2022.

== Plot ==
Two koothu artists become pawns in a political power game and are falsely implicated in a drug smuggling case.

== Cast ==
- Vaibhav as Kumaran
- Anagha as Ilayaal
- Anthakudi Ilayaraja as Muthaiya
- Aadukalam Naren as Rengarajan
- Joju George as Dhanapalan
- Tamizh as Superintendent of Police Haridas
- V. I. S. Jayapalan as Chief Minister
- Munnar Ramesh as Karuvaayan
- Ravi Mariya as Sadagoppan
- Gajaraj as Vathiyar
- Aaru Bala as Kanthan
- M. P. Viswanathan as Varadhan
- Rajkumar as Ansari
- Kumar Sangappan as Kareem
- Adithya Menon as Bhaskar

== Music ==
The music was composed by Santhosh Narayanan. The audio rights were acquired by Maajja.

Buffoon

Soundtrack album by Santhosh Narayanan
- Released: 2022
- Recorded: 2022
- Genre: Feature film soundtrack
- Label: Think Music
- Producer: Santhosh Narayanan

Santhosh Narayanan chronology
Gulu Gulu (2022)	Buffoon (2022)	Anel Meley Pani Thuli (2022)

Track listing
No.	Title	Lyrics	Singer(s)	Length
1.	"Madichu Vecha Vethala"	Raja Gurusamy	Santhosh Narayanan, Anthakudi Ilaiyaraja	4:16
2.	"Thani Maramai"	Uma Devi	Pavithra Ramesh, Aditya Ravindran	4:48
3.	"Thangu Thakadi"	Raja Gurusamy	Anthakudi Ilayaraja	2:20

== Release ==
=== Theatrical ===
The film is scheduled to be released in theatres on 23 September 2022. The teaser of the film was released on 14 March 2022. The distribution rights of the film in Tamil Nadu were acquired by B. Sakthivelan under the banner of Sakthi Film Factory.

=== Home media ===
The post-theatrical streaming rights of the film were bought by Netflix, where it began stream from 14 October 2022.

== Critical reception ==
M. Suganth of The Times of India who gave 3 stars out of 5 stars after reviewing the film stated that,"Santhosh Narayanan adds to the tense nature of the scenes with his score". Avinash Ravichandran of Cinema Express who gave 2.5 stars out of 5 stars after reviewing the film stated that "Although Buffoon definitely has a lot of heart and even more potential, there is only so much that intent can do when it has to contend with lackadaisical execution bogged further down by nonchalant writing". Harshini S V of Film Companion wrote that "Buffoon is not tempted to take the predictable route and does justice to its story with a convincing climax.
