= Yanchan Produced =

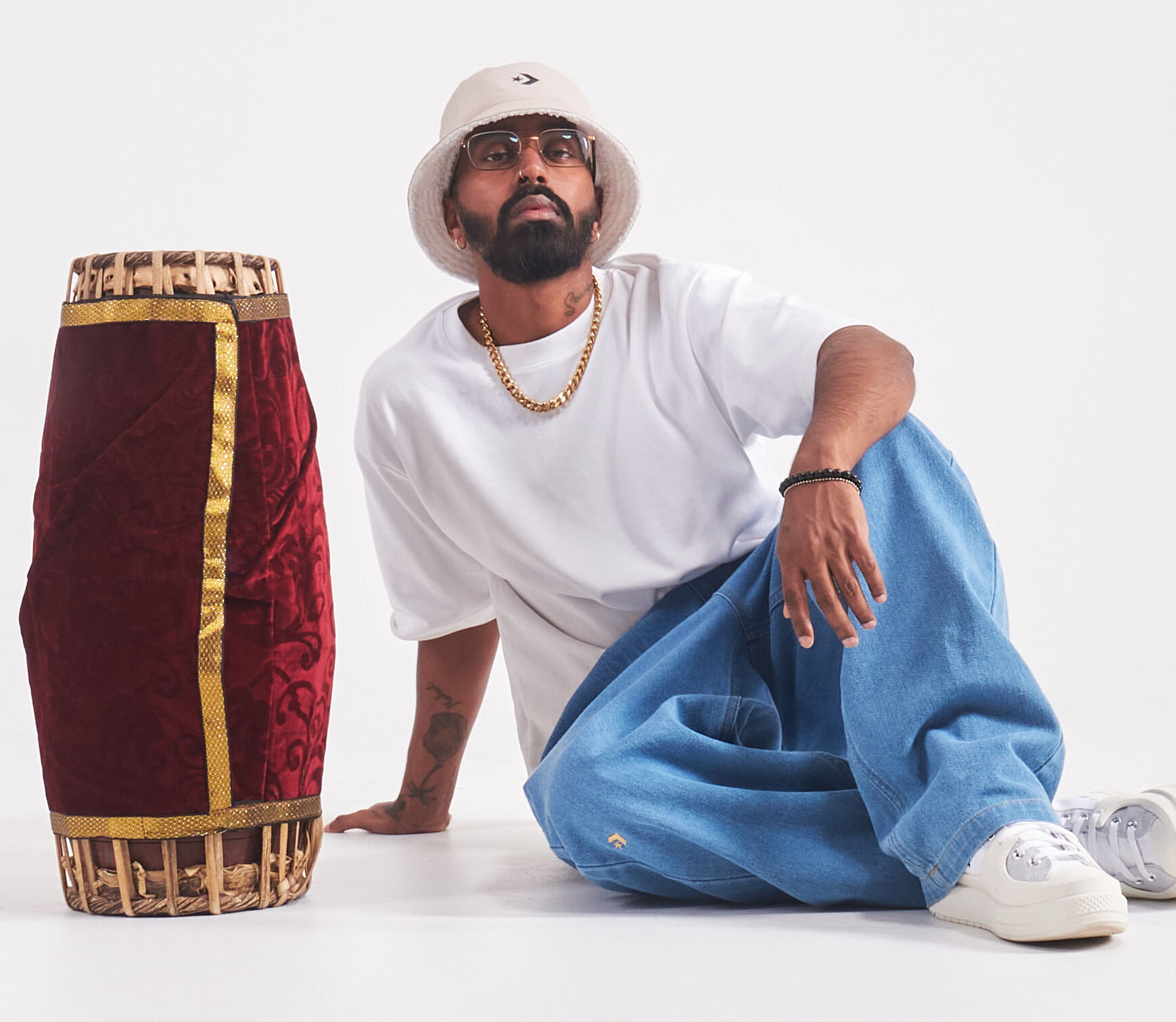

Background information
- Birth name: Yanchan Rajmohan
- Born: March 8, 1995 (age 30); Scarborough, Ontario, Canada
- Genres: Soul; Carnatic; Hip Hop; Trap; Alternative R&B; Tamil music; Electronic; Pop
- Occupations: Singer; Songwriter; Producer; Mixing Engineer
- Instruments: Vocal; Mridangam; Khanjira; Ghatam; Thavil
- Years active: 2016–present
- Labels: Emtee Music Group
- Website: yanchanproduced.com

Yanchan Rajmohan (born March 8, 1995), known professionally as Yanchan Produced, is a Sri Lankan-Canadian producer, songwriter, mixing engineer, and mridangist. He is Known for making beats with a South Asian twist.

== Early life ==
Yanchan Rajmohan was born in the Toronto district of Scarborough, Ontario and is the son of Tamil immigrants. Rajmohan's parents fled their home country, Sri Lanka, as refugees from the civil war.

At the age of six, Yanchan's musical journey began with training in vocal and mridangam in Carnatic music. Yanchan also plays the khanjira, the ghatam, and the thavil.

== Career ==
=== 2016–2019: Career Beginnings ===
In November 2016, Yanchan released his first EP, Yours Truly. Rajmohan claimed, "The sound of my entire EP is rooted in the pain and experiences I’ve dealt with in the past. It is essentially a letter I wrote to all the people who tried keeping me down, a message to them and the world of what I’m capable of."

In 2018, Yanchan's single release "Yacht" granted him a feature in HipHop Canada and Complex Canada. He also got featured on Shan Vincent De Paul's single, "Slow Love," which Rajmohan co-produced.

Yanchan released his debut album Sentimental Kids on November 15, 2019. The album consists of three singles including "I Know” which was featured in Rolling Stone India.

After the rising popularity of Yanchan and De Paul's hit "I Know," the two began collaborating and working on Carnatic Hip-Hop music through their Mrithangam Raps episodes. Mrithangam Raps is a series where Rajmohan plays the percussion instrument, the mridangam, and De Paul raps about Tamil culture, the immigrant experience, and representing brown rappers. The series received global recognition from the Tamil diaspora, kick-starting the growth of Yanchan's career internationally, particularly with markets in India.

=== 2020–2022: OH GAWD! India Tour, Kothu Boys and The Scarborough Beat Tape ===
In February 2020, Rajmohan joined De Paul for his OH GAWD! India Tour. The five city tour began in Pune at the VH1 Supersonic Festival.

Following the tour, Yanchan Produced released two solo albums, The India Beat Tape in May 2020, and Picasso in July 2020. In November 2020, Rajmohan and De Paul released their collaborative album, Kothu Boys.

The album The Scarborough Beat Tape, which was also released in 2020, was created as a love letter to the city that raised Rajmohan.

Highlights in 2021 include the release of The Vancouver Beat Tape, which was the first album to be created as a vlog. As well, Yanchan produced the single Hiyo for Indian cinema playback singer Teejay Arunasalam.

In May 2022, when Yanchan Produced released the single “Remember,” it gained instant popularity with thousands of people using the song for their videos on social media, including the likes of Shriya Saran and Trisha.

=== 2023–Present: Career Expansion ===
Top tour highlights for 2023 include supporting Santhosh Narayan at The Sounds of the South' show in Malaysia, gigs in Taipei with De Paul, and opening for 50 Cent’s The Final Lap Tour with De Paul in Mumbai.

Yanchan Produced also released the Arul EP with Sandeep Narayan in November 2023 that focused on bridging the gap between North America and India through a five set song series, which was featured on CBC.

As well, in 2023, Yanchan co-produced “The Wind'' from Russ’ album “Santiago," and he co-produced the song “Cricket Rap” with Santhosh Narayan for his first Telugu film, "Dasara."

In March 2024, “Inimel” was released which was composed by Kamal Hassan and Shruti Hassan, and co-produced by Yanchan Produced.

Yanchan debuted the Yanchan Produced LIVE performance in Toronto in March 2024, followed by New York in June 2024.

In April 2024, Yanchan Produced performed at the NBA game between the Toronto Raptors and the Los Angeles Lakers at the Scotiabank Arena in Toronto.

=== Emtee Music Group ===
Yanchan’s involvement with Emtee Music Group has evolved beyond foundation building as he is currently the Chief Product Officer for the label.

He has collaborated with various artists in the music industry. A few notable mentions include: Ary Roberto touring with Karl Wolf, and Velvet K.O. touring with Bugus and Kisaki’s on the Anime North tour. He is also involved in producing for brands.

== Discography ==
=== EPs ===
Title	Details
Yours Truly	Released: November 2016 Format: Digital Download, Streaming
Arul	Released: November 2023 Label: Emtee Music Group Format: Digital Download, Streaming

=== Albums ===
Title	Details
Sentimental Kids	Released: November 2019 Format: Digital Download, Streaming
The India Beat Tape	Released: May 2020 Label: Emtee Music Group Format: Digital Download, Streaming
The Scarborough Beat Tape	Released: May 2020 Label: Emtee Music Group Format: Digital Download, Streaming
Picasso	Released: July 2020 Label: Emtee Music Group Format: Digital Download, Streaming
Kothu Boys	Released: November 2020 Format: Digital Download, Streaming
The Vancouver Beat Tape	Released: March 2022 Label: Emtee Music Group Format: Digital Download, Streaming

=== Production ===
Title	Year	Artist	Featured In
Hiyo	2021	Teejay	Independent Song
The Wind	2023	Russ	Santiago (Album)
Cricket Rap	2023	Santhosh Narayan, SVDP	Dasara (Telugu Film)
Inimel	2024	Shruti, Kamal Haasan	Inimel (Independent Song)
Pudhu Wave	2024	Tha Mystro	

=== Singles as Lead Artist ===
Title	Year
All Out	2017
Same Old	2017
Yacht	2018
Get It	2018
Coming Down	2018
I Know	2019
Fantasy	2019
Happen Like This	2019
Destruction	2019
Best Friend	2020
Unai Paathu	2020
Overtime	2020
Uyire	2021
Remember	2022
Yedo Maayam	2023

=== Singles as Featured Artist ===
Title	Year
Slow Love (SVDP)	2018
See Me Now (Vinnin)	2022
Teri Yaad (Shahzeb Tejani)	2023
Ennaagumo (Sahi Siva)	2024
Chai and Sunshine (Anjulie)	2024
Hard to Love You (Anjulie and Zach Zoya)	2024

== Tours Supporting ==
Title	Location	Year	Artist
OH GAWD! India Tour	India	2020	Shan Vincent De Paul
The Sounds of the South Tour	Malaysia	2023	Santhosh Narayan
Local Shows	Taipei	2023	Shan Vincent De Paul
The Final Lap Tour	India	2023	50 Cent
