= Therukural =

2019 studio album by Arivu and OFRO

Studio album by Arivu and OfRo
- Released: 26 June 2019
- Recorded: 2018–2019
- Genre: Studio album, Soundtrack, pop music, Rap
- Length: 20:05
- Language: Tamil
- Label: Ditto Music
- Producer: The Casteless Collective; OfRo

The Casteless Collective chronology
Magizhchi (2019)	Therukural (2019)

Therukural (Note: Therukural is derived from Thirukkural (a Tamil language literature book), where the word "Thiru" is replaced with "Theru" (street), as the album is mostly based on street music.) is a studio album composed by Arivu and OfRo, both members of The Casteless Collective. The band also produced the album, which highlights various political themes and was touted to be a hip-hop album with a social message. The album was released on 26 June 2019, and received positive response upon release.

== Development ==
=== Background ===
When I watched him I was sure he had been training for years. But I was shocked to find that he had only started to learn rap. Forget training, he had only just begun to listen to rap music.

— Rohit Abraham, on his collaboration with Arivu in an interview with The New Indian Express

Arivu, a member of the Casteless Collective earlier performed several songs for the band, announced his collaboration with Rohit Abraham, known as OfRo to produce their first independent album titled Therukural. It was his first attempt in producing and crooning rap numbers with this album.

Rohit had been part of several bands and had worked with top music directors in the Tamil film industry. He also brought out few independent albums. His foray into Tamil music happened after he realised that there was a huge divide between the people who liked western music and Tamil music. He stated, "I wanted to bridge the gap. And that's how I decided to get into Tamil rap".

=== Production ===
"ok sir." was the first song that Arivu had written. He eventually discussed with his band's core member Tenma and OfRo, to imagine how this song could be made, then he decided to write about his own journey to rap world, while also crediting his mentor Pa. Ranjith. "anti indian.", which released early through Madras Medai, is about how humanity is above all. Rohit stated that "If you listen to the lyrics of the song, you would know that it is more patriotic than most politicians claim to be." The song "kalla mouni." is a political satire which takes on the hypocrisy of people. Arivu initially planned to curate a song to ridicule and question the stereotypes that are thrust on women and also to praise women for wanting to be exactly who they are. So he decided to give the name "tamizhachi." and he added that women should not be criticised or ridiculed for their modern thinking.

After writing "tamizhachi.", Arivu planned to write another song to show how women are being treated from Kashmir to Kanyakumari. With the idea of the Thoothukudi massacre and the Kathua rape incident, he gave the title "snowlin." (a victim of the Thoothukudi firing). This song is preceded by a recording of all the voices from the Thoothukudi massacre, from victims to news reporters to activists to finally, the voice of Snowlin's mother talking about how she felt she had given up her child as a sacrifice. Later, the final song of the album is "middle class" (featuring Malaysian rapper, Roshan Jamrock), which is a sort of an autobiographical account of Arivu's experiences, though he stated that "it is about how young boys from the middle class dream of, how they have and fun and their lifestyle, is basically my lived experiences".

== Release ==
Therukural was initially under production from mid-2018. During this period, Arivu decided to shoot make a video for the song "Anti-Indian" and release it in the time of 2019 Indian general elections. As a result, the song was later unveiled through the YouTube channel of Madras Medai and in Facebook on 17 April 2019. The song received viral response upon release and ensured the hype for the soundtrack release. On 26 June 2019, Pa. Ranjith launched the entire soundtrack album which had six songs, including the earlier released single. It is available on Spotify, Apple Music, iTunes and YouTube Music.

== Track listing ==
No.	Title	Singer(s)	Length
1.	"kalla mouni."	Arivu, OfRo	03:09
2.	"anti indian."	Arivu, OfRo	03:49
3.	"sterlite_skit."	Arivu, OfRo	01:09
4.	"tamizhachi."	Arivu, OfRo	04:01
5.	"snowlin."	Arivu, OfRo	03:26
6.	"middle class"	Arivu, OfRo, Roshan Jamrock	03:16
7.	"ok sir."	Arivu, OfRo, Tenma	03:13

== Reception ==
=== Critical response ===
Anjana Shekhar of The News Minute stated "Therukural by Arivu-OfRo is a brilliant Tamil hiphop album. By the time you reach the end of the album, in 22 minutes, you’ll want to play it another time, if haven’t already turned on your loop." The video song Kallamouni which released during its initial launch crossed 30,000 views and became a sensation upon release. Other videos of the songs released one by one, received the same during the initial launch. Rolling Stone India described it as one of the 10 best Indian albums of 2019.

=== Controversies ===
Despite the positive reception, the video song "anti indian." had to be removed permanently from the Facebook page after few days of its release, citing that the song violated the community guidelines of Facebook posts. Later, another controversy arose that the duo had used the cases of Asifa and Snowlin to 'gain publicity' but defended them saying "Rap originated from pain, from the Black community wanting to talk about their problems and their empowerment. Thank God, that at least through art we're reminded of Asifa and Snowlin. May we never forget them and may the music never die."
