= Maajja =

Record label

maajja
- Founded: 2021
- Founder: Noel Kirthiraj; Sen Sachi; Sean Abbarow; Prasana Balachandran
- Country of origin: Canada
- Location: Tamil Nadu, India; Kuala Lumpur, Malaysia; Toronto, Canada
- Official website: www.maajja.com

Maajja (stylised in all lowercase maajja) is an independent record label and distribution company based out of Toronto and Chennai. Unlike traditional record labels, the label does not own their artists’ master recordings.

== History ==
=== 2021―present: Formation ===
Maajja was founded by Canadian tech entrepreneurs, Noel Kirthiraj, Sen Sachi, Sean Abbarow, Prasana Balachandran as a "technology-enabled label alternative" created with artists in mind.

Maajja was announced to the public on 26 January 2021 in a video, presented by A.R. Rahman, on the maajja YouTube channel.

== Mission ==
What ends up happening is you will have all these great musicians leave the industry as they may not be able to sustain themselves financially. Many end up doing some other job to pay the bills, which takes the focus away from creation. As maajja, if we’re able to solve even a fraction of that and help artists sustain themselves, we would have made an impact in the lives of millions,

— Noel Kirthiraj

Maajja aims to establish sustainable careers for their artists, hence the label not owning master recordings and all copyrights remaining with the artists when they release music via the label.

== Artists ==
=== Soloists ===
- Dhee
- Arivu
- Shan Vincent de Paul
- Navz-47
- Ami
- Shashaa Tirupati
- Satthia
- Tha Mystro
- Pravin Saivi
- Sakthi Amaran
- Maalavika Sundar

=== Groups ===
- Two's a Company
- The Casteless Collective
- Kothu Boys
- Staccato

=== Producers ===
- A.R. Rahman
- Santhosh Narayanan
- ofRo
- Pravin Mani
- Steve Cliff

== Discography ==
List of songs distributed by Maajja
Release date	Title	Artist	Type	Format	Language	Ref.
7 March 2021	"Enjoy Enjaami"	Dhee (ft. Arivu) produced by Santhosh Narayanan	Single	Streaming, digital download	Tamil	
18 March 2021	"Amnesia"	Shan Vincent de Paul (ft. Ami)	Single	Streaming, digital download	English	
2 April 2021	"Vince"	Two's a Company	Single	Streaming, digital download	English	
2 April 2021	"Kaadhal Aagalaam"	Magisha	Single	Streaming, digital download	Tamill	
16 April 2021	"Idhu Varai"	Staccato	Single	Streaming, digital download	Tamil	
16 April 2021	"Vaa Sakhi"	Maalavika Sundar	Single	Streaming, digital download	Tamil	
23 April 2021	"Free Will"	Pravin Saivi & Sakhti Amaran	Single	Streaming, digital download	Tamil	
30 April 2021	High on Music	Steve Cliff	Album	Streaming, digital download		
30 April 2021	"Ondrallo"	Tha Mystro (ft. Vernon G Segaram)	Single	Streaming, digital download	Tamil	
30 April 2021	"Un Tholil Naan Saaya"	Shashaa Tirupati (ft.Keba Jeremiah)	Single	Streaming, digital download	Tamil	
28 May 2021	"Savage"	Shan Vincent de Paul	Single	Streaming, digital download	English	
30 June 2021	"Neeye Oli"	Shan Vincent de Paul, Navz-47 produced by Santhosh Narayanan	Single	Streaming, digital download	English, Tamil	
7 July 2021	"XO"	dasa, Shaq-T	Single	Streaming, digital download		
9 July 2021	"Hard Times"	Shan Vincent de Paul	Single	Streaming, digital download	English	
23 July 2021	"Uyire"	Shan Vincent de Paul, Yanchan	Single	Streaming, digital download	English, Tamil	
1 August 2021	Kalliyugam	dasa, Shaq-T	EP	Streaming, digital download	English, Tamil	
13 August 2021	"After Life"	Coleman Hell, Pritt (Prithika Pathmanathan), Shan Vincent de Paul	Single	Streaming, digital download	English	
6 September 2021	Made in Jaffna	Shan Vincent de Paul	Album	Streaming, digital download	English, Tamil	
10 September 2021	"Into the Storm"	DEYO, Janani (ft. Question416)	Single	Streaming, digital download	English	
13 September 2021	"Fear"	Shilpa Ananth	Single	Streaming, digital download	English	
1 October 2021	"XO (Remix)"	dasa, Shaq-T	Single	Streaming, digital download	English	
8 October 2021	"DB Breaker"	DEYO, Bonio Vescas	Single	Streaming, digital download	English	
27 October 2021	"Aleka"	FSPROD Vinu, FSPROD Mithu	Single	Streaming, digital download	English	
10 December 2021	"Certified Snaccboi"	dasa, Shaq-T	Single	Streaming, digital download	English	
17 December 2021	"Unnal Anbe"	Arjun Menon, Pravin Mani	Single	Streaming, digital download	Tamil	
31 December 2021	Analogical	D I N I O	Album	Streaming, digital download	English	
25 March 2022	"Moopilla Thamizhe Thaaye"	A. R. Rahman, Thamarai, Saindhavi	Album	Streaming, digital download	Tamil	
