= Oppari =

Music genre

Oppaari Song

An oppari is an ancient form of lamenting in southern India, particularly in Tamil Nadu, Pondicherry, and North-Eastern Sri Lanka. Oppari is a folk song tradition and is often an admixture of eulogy and lament. The oppari is typically sung by a group of women relatives who came to pay respects to the departed in a death ceremony. It is a means to express one's own grief and also to share and assuage one's grief for the deceased. Many communities use the oppari to express their grief at a funeral. Sometimes professional oppari singers are recruited, but it is a dying practice.

== Content and theme ==
The songs do not follow a set pattern; rather, the lyrics are sung impromptu, mostly improvised, and eulogise the person who has died. The oppari is also often centred around the relatives of the deceased and stresses the nature of the blood relation (mother, father, brother, sister etc.) between the person and the deceased. The oppari singer sings, wails and beats her chest and accompanied to the sounds of a beating drum she helps mourners bring their buried grief to the surface.

A sample theme of a daughter lamenting father's death is described below:

Her body, wracked with grief, sways and her full-throated voice rises and falls as she talks to her father. "You were a freedom fighter, you worked with Subhash Chandra Bose, for six months you went to Germany," she wails, beating the ground with her hands. "In Germany, you met a girl you fell in love with. I found her photograph one day and you told me all about her, though my mother, whom you married when you came back to India after Independence, was angry."

Opparis are rich in wordplay relating to names and events associated with the deceased person. Colourful local idioms also decorate the lyrics. While oppari singing is still prominent in rural Tamil Nadu, the tradition had almost died out in urban Tamil Nadu.

An Oppari (lamentation song) recorded at Salem Mettur, Tamil Nadu

== Representation in modern cinema ==
- The Tamil film Sethum Aayiram Pon highlights this practice.
- The song Enjoy Enjaami which was sung by Arivu and Dhee highlights this practice.
- Several of director Mari Selvaraj's collaborations with composer Santosh Narayanan, feature oppari songs.
  - The 2018 Tamil film Pariyerum Perumal includes an oppari in the form of a boom-bap hip-hop track, Karuppi.
  - The 2021 Tamil film Karnan features Manjanathi Puranam.
  - The 2024 Tamil film Vaazhai contains the oppari song, Paadhavathi.
- The Tamil film Rail depicts the oppari song, Elay Sevathavane, composed and sung by S. J. Jananiy collaborated with the Bulgarian National Symphony Orchestra. This song is a blend of the identical oppari singing that merges with a strings symphony.
