= Anel Meley Pani Thuli =

2022 film by Kaiser Anand

- Character poster with release date
- Directed by: R. Kaiser Anand
- Written by: R. Kaiser Anand
- Produced by: Vetrimaaran
- Starring: Andrea Jeremiah; Aadhav Kannadasan
- Cinematography: Velraj
- Edited by: Raja Mohammad
- Music by: Santhosh Narayanan
- Production company: Grass Root Film Company
- Distributed by: SonyLIV
- Release date: 18 November 2022
- Country: India
- Language: Tamil

Anel Meley Pani Thuli (transl. Dew drops over fire) is a 2022 Indian Tamil-language crime drama film written and directed by R. Kaiser Anand in his debut. Produced by Vetrimaaran via Grass Root Film Company, the film stars Andrea Jeremiah and Aadhav Kannadasan. The music was composed by Santhosh Narayanan, with cinematography by Velraj, and editing by Raja Mohammad. The film was released on Sony LIV on 18 November 2022, and received mostly positive reviews from critics.

== Plot ==
Madhi has her marriage arranged with a suitable groom named Saran, and they have a happy life. She works at a sports store as a manager. One day, a male employee and a man are stealing equipment from the store. Madhi strategically catches them and tells the employee to resign as it would be better than she sacking him and branding him as a thief. The employee realizes his crime and begs for his job, but Madhi does not budge. Meanwhile, a young female employee is getting harassed by a local goon as the two were lovers, but she does not like him now. Madhi politely tells the goon to back off and give the employee her space, but the goon still causes a stir. The customers threaten the goon, and he gets humiliated. This makes the female employee confident enough that she can have her marriage with someone else in Kodaikanal.

Madhi goes to Kodaikanal alone and enjoys the wedding celebrations. Afterwards, she decides to go sightseeing. On the way, her battery dies and she gets kidnapped. The next shot is her half-naked in a pitch-black forest, implying that she has been sexually harassed. In a dense forest at night, the whole atmosphere is dangerous; however, she somehow makes it to a clinic but does not receive proper care due to no senior doctors. Weak and anxious, she reaches the police station, where she reports her crime, and Sub-Inspector Thillainayagam nabs the goon and the male employee, but the culprits should be in the 45-to-50-year range. However, Thillainayagam and Sub-Inspectors Munusamy and Elango are. It is now made clear that the three policemen are the rapists. The police initially let her go but become suspicious.

Just then, the senior female cop, Inspector Maragatham, comes, and the three policemen try to hide Madhi from Maragatham, but Madhi meets Maragatham and they talk about the assault. Maragatham is enraged and assures Madhi that she will help her. However, the three policemen do not want to get caught, so they tell everyone to leave. They drag Madhi, forcibly take off her clothes, take a naked video of her, and blackmail her. They say they will release it if she reports them. A depressed Madhi leaves and meets Saran, who still accepts her. She seeks treatment; however, she is still dismal. She then gets a lawyer and makes her stand.

The three policemen are now humiliated and try to cover their tracks by destroying the evidence of the rape, but they get caught red-handed. However, they upload the naked video and alter it to make it look like the assault was with her consent. Many people disgrace Madhi, but she is still strong. Meanwhile, Saran's family tells him that he should not marry Madhi, but he asks what wrong she did, and they are silent. The next day, Madhi goes to court and tells everything about the assault. She says that the day she left, she felt burdened and knew that she had to get the three policemen punished legally. She knew about the naked video but realized that her body is her weapon and not theirs, so she overcame her hurdle and decided to teach the policemen a lesson. The judge is inspired by Madhi.

A few months later, Madhi has become famous and has married Saran. She is now happier and gives lectures about rape and how to seek help. She says it was not the victim's fault so they should not be ashamed, and the victim must never feel their life is over. Everyone claps for her.

== Cast ==
- Andrea Jeremiah as Madhi
- Aadhav Kannadasan as Saran
- Azhagam Perumal as Sub-Inspector Thillainayagam
- Ilavarasu as Sub-Inspector Munusamy
- Nithin George as Sub-Inspector Elango
- Anupama Kumar as Inspector Maragatham
- Lovelyn Chandrasekhar as Anitha
- Viji Chandrasekhar
- Jeeva Ravi as Sharan's father
- Vidhya as Sharan's mother
- Telephone Raj as Sharan's uncle
- Muthu Nagu as Mathi's father
- Bhagyamathi as Madhu'a mother
- Geetha Kailasam as Anitha's mother
- Bhoominathan as Anitha's uncle
- Pradeep R. Vijayan as Prabhu
- Perumal as Sathish
- Nagaraj as Prabhu's friend
- Kayalvizhi as Constable Amudha
- Nambi as Mathi's advocate
- Soundarya as Junior Advocate
- Vaishnavi as Mathi's friend
- Jahnavi Shiju as Young Mathi

== Production ==
On 9 May 2022, Dhanush unveiled the first look poster of the film starring Andrea Jeremiah. Kaiser Anand made his directorial debut with this film, produced by Vetrimaaran under Grass Root Film Company and photographed by Velraj. The title was derived from a song from Vaaranam Aayiram (2008).

== Music ==
The film's soundtrack was composed by Santhosh Narayanan while lyrics are written by Vivek. The first single "Mittai Mittai" released on 24 June 2022.

Track listing
No.	Title	Lyrics	Singer(s)	Length
1.	"Mittai Mittai"	Vivek	Vijay Narain, Karthika Vaidyanathan, Santhosh Narayanan	4:48
2.	"Keeche Keeche"	Arivu	Meenakshi Elayaraja, Santhosh Narayanan	3:12
3.	"Yedhu Naan Inge"	Uma Devi	Andrea Jeremiah	4:18

== Release and reception ==
Anel Meley Pani Thuli premiered on SonyLIV on 18 November 2022.
