= Pritt (artist) =

British singer-songwriter

- Born: Prithika Pathmanathan; Denmark
- Origin: London, England
- Occupations: Singer-songwriter; radio presenter
- Instrument: Vocals

Prithika Pathmanathan, known professionally as Pritt, is a Danish-born, UK-based Tamil singer-songwriter and radio show presenter on BBC Asian Network. She describes herself as an "Eelam Tamil" girl based in South London and her style as "East meets West". Her songs combine western R&B elements with traditional Carnatic sounds and South Asian musical styles. She released her debut single, "Deja Vu", in 2017. Her discography includes three EP and collaborations with various other Tamil musicians. In the early 2020s, her cover of the 2007 Tamil song "Unakkul Naane" went viral on social media.

== Life and career ==
Prithika Pathmanathan was born in Denmark to Sri Lankan Tamil parents. She began performing at the age of two, when her mother, a drama teacher, noticed her singing abilities and introduced her to Carnatic music. Despite this, she has mentioned having to overcome hurdles when it came to getting her parents' approval for a career in music. Her family moved to the UK when she was still a child, and she is based in South London.

During the COVID-19 pandemic, Pritt quit her job in retail to pursue music full-time. In 2021, she became a radio show presenter on BBC Asian Network and was subsequently the first Tamil woman to be named a Future Sounds artist for BBC Asian Network.

Pritt has talked about the difficulties Tamil artists face in the Western world, with many people in the music industry not understanding her origins and wanting her to present herself as Black or Indian. In response, Pritt has extensively drawn from her Tamil roots in her music. Her songs often feature the Tamil language, and music videos often involve both Tamil actors and crew. Pritt has additionally strived to be a positive role model for young Tamil women worldwide. She blends elements of her personal life into her music, using childhood photos or wedding pictures for album covers and music videos.

Pritt released her debut single, "Deja Vu", in 2017. She followed it with the EP Unknown in 2018, a collaboration with dilushselva. She has since issued two more EPs: Transparency (2020) and Take 2 (2021), a collaboration with the British Tamil artist S.A.M. In 2021, she released a cover of the Tamil song "Unakkul Naane" (Harris Jayaraj, Rohini, Bombay Jayashri), which subsequently went viral on social media. The same year, she was featured on the song "Afterlife" by the Canadian Tamil singer and rapper Shan Vincent de Paul.

== Discography ==
EPs

- unknown (2018)
- Transparency (2020)
- Take 2 (2021)

Singles

- "Deja Vu" (2017)
- "Ecstasy" (2018)
- "Tunnel Vision" (2020)
- "Identity" (2020)
- "Smoke & Mirrors" with S.A.M. (2021)
- "365" (2021)
- "C U Win" (2022)
- "You Love" with TWLVE (2022)
- "You Mine//Home" with TWLVE (2022)

- "Out on Me" with Kartik Kuna and Beatsbykapss (2022)
- "Unakkul Naane" with dilushselva (2023)
- "The Grind" with Nia Wyn (2023)
- "Kaalam" with dilushselva (2023)
- "Envy" (2023) (with kiwi? and ZAIB)
- "Kaanal Nere" with Kiwi? (2025)
- "Fendi" with MONOH (2026)
- "Kadhalan" with Dusky and Nadeem Karim (2026)
