= Dagaalty =

2020 Indian Tamil-language film

- Theatrical release poster
- Directed by: Vijay Anand
- Written by: Vijay Anand
- Story by: Vijay Anand
- Produced by: S.P. Chowdhary
- Starring: Santhanam; Rittika Sen; Yogi Babu
- Cinematography: Deepak Kumar Padhy
- Edited by: T. S. Suresh
- Music by: Vijay Narain
- Production companies: Handmade Films; 18 Reels
- Release date: 31 January 2020
- Running time: 120 minutes
- Country: India
- Language: Tamil

Dagaalty (transl. Trickster) is a 2020 Indian Tamil-language action comedy film written and directed by Vijay Anand. The film stars Santhanam, Rittika Sen and Yogi Babu. It marks Santhanam and Yogi Babu's second collaboration, after they previously appeared in an episode of Lollu Sabha. It revolves around a trickster who turns good, a girl sought by a Samrat and how other characters' plans for winning the prize money (for bringing the girl to Samrat) go away. The film was released on 31 January 2020. This film marks Rittika's acting debut in the Tamil film industry.

== Plot ==
Guru (Santhanam), a fraudster is assigned a task by Bhaiya (Radha Ravi) to find a person (Rittika Sen) and bring her to Mumbai. He goes to Thiruchendur in search of that girl and eventually finds her. What happens next forms the crux of the story.

== Cast ==
- Santhanam as Guru
- Rittika Sen as Malli
- Radha Ravi as Bhaiya
- Yogi Babu as Dheena
- Tarun Arora as Vijay Samrat
- Brahmanandam as China Madhan
- Hemant Pandey as Robert
- Stunt Silva as Narasimha Reddy
- Namo Narayana as Malli's brother-in-law
- Santhana Bharathi as Malli's father
- Rekha as Malli's mother
- Manobala as Film director
- Saroja Ammal as Malli's grandmother
- Surender Thakur as Malik
- Telephone Raj as Tea master
- Scarlett Mellish Wilson in an item number

== Production ==
Principal photography began on 27 December 2018 in Chennai. Shooting wrapped up in September 2019. This is the biggest budget film in Actor Santhanam's career so far. Vijay Anand was an Associate of Director Shankar.

== Soundtrack ==
The soundtrack and background scores are all composed by Vijaynarain. Star Music India has acquired the audio rights.

No.	Title	Lyrics	Artist(s)	Length
1.	"Dagaalty Naa!"	Arivu	Arivu	1:05
2.	"Paaren Paaren"	Subu	Vijaynarain	4:39
3.	"Kotha Kothudhu Bodhai"	Subu	Vijaynarain, Santhosh Narayanan, Govind Vasantha	4:29
4.	"Yedho Maayam"	Subu	Dhee	3:52
5.	"Aaliyah Aaliyah"	Madhan Karky	Gowtham Bharadwaj, Harshitha Krishnan	4:16
6.	"The Dagaalty Theme"		Vijaynarain	0:54
Total length:				19:15

== Marketing ==
The film's first look was released in June 2019. Teaser was released on 1 December 2019 after announcements in the film director's Twitter handle. The film was released on 31 January 2020.
