= Enjoy Enjaami =

2021 single by Dhee and Arivu

Single by Dhee, Arivu and Santhosh Narayanan
- Language: Tamil
- Released: 7 March 2021 (Single); 10 March 2021 (Music video)
- Recorded: 2021
- Studio: Future Tense Studios; AM Studios; Krimson Avenue Studios; Resound India; Studio MOCA
- Genre: Oppari; pop; hip hop
- Length: 5:06
- Label: Maajja
- Composers: Santhosh Narayanan, Arivu
- Lyricist: Arivu
- Producer: Santhosh Narayanan

Santhosh Narayanan singles chronology
"Enjoy Enjaami" (2021)	"Neeye Oli" (2021)

Music video
- "Enjoy Enjaami" on YouTube

"Enjoy Enjaami" (transl. Enjoy, My dear /Enjoy, M'lord) is a Tamil-language song recorded by singer Dhee featuring Indian rapper Arivu and Indian producer Santhosh Narayanan. It was written and sung by lyricist Arivu and Dhee, and composed and arranged by Narayanan under the music label/management Maajja, an independent platform launched by Indian producer A. R. Rahman. The song was released on 7 March 2021.

"Enjoy Enjaami" is a pop and hip hop song incorporating elements of R&B and oppari, a folk music style of Tamil Nadu. Its lyrics discuss civilizations and natural resources, inspired by events of colonial India, and is a homage to Tamil culture and people. The song was met with viral commercial success and widespread acclaim. Music critics praised the song's production, lyricism and the duo's vocals.

Its music video was released on YouTube on 10 March 2021. The video has gained more than 5 million likes and 508 million views (as of May 2025), becoming the first Tamil independent single to do so. The video was lauded for its themes and design. A remixed version of this song performed by DJ Snake along with Dhee, was released exclusively through Spotify on 21 June 2021, as a part of Spotify Singles initiative. "Enjoy Enjaami" has been regarded as the indicator to the advent of Tamil indie music.

== Background ==
According to the lyricist, Arivu, the song was written as a celebration of his roots, harkening back to a time when humanity was a fledgling civilisation, living in harmony with the turns of the earth and the many lives that shared it with them. His inspiration came from several places.

Both, Dhee and Arivu had discussed while working on Manikandan's Kadaisi Vivasayi. Arivu, who has been writing songs for The Casteless Collective, a political folk band, stated that: "They [the songs] are filled with anger which is not something that people would listen to. But, we do it knowing that it’s not a commercial space; Athu Makkalukaana Kural (The People's Voice)." However, he wanted the song to reach everyone and yet to have a political depth to it, which is according to Arivu, the idea — ulagam naaikum, narikum, punaikum, elikum, pooranukum sontham dhan (The world is for all the living beings) — came up. The team also stated that the song is inspired by Pa. Ranjith's work for his band Casteless Collective.

The song is the story of Valliammal, Arivu's grandmother, who used to call him 'Enjaami' (My Lord). It was the story told to him by his grandmother about the Tamil migration to Ceylon during the Colonial era. During the period of Colonial India, with a poverty-stricken population, it was a market for cheap labour. Hordes of Tamil people were sent to Ceylon in the 19th century to work on the tea, coffee and rubber plantations, with his grandmother being one of them. This inspired Arivu's lyrics which alluded to humanity's relationship to the Earth, with reference to the land, soil, and ancestors. Valliammal makes an appearance at the end of the music video, sat on a throne-esque seat, flanked by Arivu and Dhee to her left and right. Through this song, Arivu hoped to convey the forgotten roots of the Earth and the roots of self as a people. V Vivek of Deccan Herald stated that the song is a tribute to the Tamil plantation house and its workers.

Santhosh stated that composition, production, recording and the accompanying music video shoot took place within 30 hours.

== Lyrics ==
Tamil Lyrics	Transliteration	English Translation
குக்கூ குக்க தாத்தா தாத்தா களவெட்டி குக்கூ குக்கூ பொந்துல யாரு மீன்கொத்தி குக்கூ குக்கூ தண்ணியில் ஓடும் தவளக்கி குக்கூ குக்கூ கம்பளி பூச்சி தங்கச்சி அள்ளி மலர்க்கொடி அங்கதமே ஒட்டரே ஒட்டரே சந்தனமே முல்லை மலர்க்கொடி முத்தாரமே எங்கூரு எங்கூரு குத்தாலமே சுருக்கு பையம்மா வெத்தலை மட்டையம்மா சொமந்த கையம்மா மத்தளம் கோட்டுயம்மா தாயம்மா தாயம்மா என்ன பண்ண மாயம்மா வள்ளியம்மா பேராண்டி சங்கதியை கூறேண்டி கண்ணாடியே காணோடி இந்தர்ரா பேராண்டி அன்னைக்கிளி அன்னைக்கிளி அடி ஆலமரக்கிளை வண்ணக்கிளி நல்லபடி வாழச்சொல்லி இந்த மண்ணை கொடுத்தானே பூர்வகுடி கம்மங்கரை காணியெல்லாம் பாடி திரிஞ்சானே ஆத்திச்சூடி நாய் நரி பூனைக்கெல்லாம் இந்த ஏரிகுளம் கூட சொந்தமடி எஞ்சாய் எஞ்சாமி வாங்கோ வாங்கோ ஒன்னாகி அம்மா ஏ அம்பாரி இந்தா இந்தா மும்மாரி ஆண் & எஞ்சாய் எஞ்சாமி வாங்கோ வாங்கோ ஒன்னாகி அம்மா ஏ அம்பாரி இந்தா இந்தா மும்மாரி குக்கூ குக்கூ முட்டைய போடும் கோழிக்கு குக்கூ குக்கூ ஒப்பனை யாரு மயிலுக்கு குக்கூ குக்கூ பச்சையை பூசும் பாசிக்கு குக்கூ குக்கூ குச்சிய அடுக்குன கூட்டுக்கு பாடுபட்ட மக்கா வரப்பு மேட்டுக்காரா வேர்வத்தண்ணி சொக்கா மினுக்கும் நாட்டுக்காரா ஆக்காட்டி கருப்பட்டி ஊதங்கொழு மண்ணுச்சட்டி ஆத்தோரம் கூடுகட்டி ஆரம்பிச்ச நாகரீகம் ஜன் ஜனே ஜனக்கு ஜனே மக்களே உப்புக்கு சப்பு கொட்டி முட்டைக்குள்ள சத்துக்கொட்டு அடக்கி ரத்தங்கொட்டு கிட்டிப்புள்ளு வெட்டு வெட்டு நான் அஞ்சு மரம் வளர்த்தேன் அழகான தோட்டம் வச்சேன் தோட்டம் செழிச்சாலும் என் தொண்டை நனையலேயே என் கடலே கரையே வனமே சனமே நிலமே குளமே இடமே தடமே எஞ்சாய் எஞ்சாமி வாங்கோ வாங்கோ ஒன்னாகி அம்மா ஏ அம்பாரி இந்தா இந்தா மும்மாரி எஞ்சாய் எஞ்சாமி வாங்கோ வாங்கோ ஒன்னாகி அம்மா ஏ அம்பாரி இந்தா இந்தா மும்மாரி பாட்டன் பூட்டன் காத்த பூமி ஆட்டம் போட்டு காட்டும் சாமி ராட்டினந்தா சுத்தி வந்தா சேவ கூவுச்சு அது போட்டு வச்ச எச்சம்தானே காடா மாறுச்சு நம்ம நாடா மாறுச்சு இந்த வீடா மாறுச்சு என்ன கொரை என்ன கொரை என் சீனி கரும்புக்கு என்ன கொரை என்ன கொரை என்ன கொரை என் செல்ல பேராண்டிக்கு என்ன கொரை பந்தலுல பாவக்கா பந்தலுல பாவக்கா வெதகள்ளு விட்டுருக்கு அது வெதகள்ளு விட்டுருக்கு அப்பன் ஆத்தா விட்டதுங்க அப்பன் ஆத்தா விட்டதுங்க எஞ்சாய் எஞ்சாமி வாங்கோ வாங்கோ ஒன்னாகி அம்மா ஏ அம்பாரி இந்தா இந்தா மும்மாரி எஞ்சாய் எஞ்சாமி வாங்கோ வாங்கோ ஒன்னாகி அம்மா ஏ அம்பாரி இந்தா இந்தா மும்மாரி எஞ்சாய் எஞ்சாமி வாங்கோ வாங்கோ ஒன்னாகி அம்மா ஏ அம்பாரி இந்தா இந்தா மும்மாரி எஞ்சாய் எஞ்சாமி வாங்கோ வாங்கோ ஒன்னாகி அம்மா ஏ அம்பாரி இந்தா இந்தா மும்மாரி என் கடலே கரையே வனமே சனமே நிலமே குளமே இடமே தடமே குக்கூ குக்கூ	Cuckoo Cuckoo Thatha Thatha Kala Vetti Cuckoo Cuckoo Pondhula Yaru Meen Koththi Cuckoo Cuckoo Thanniyil Odum Thavalaikki Cuckoo Cuckoo Kambali Poochi Thangachi Allimalar Kodi Angadhame Ottara Ottara Sandhaname Mullai Malar Kodi Muththarame Engooru Engooru Kuththalame Surukku Paiyamma Veththala Mattaiyamma Somandha Kaiyamma Maththalam Kottuyamma Thaiyamma Thaiyamma Enna Panna Mayamma Valliamma Perandi Sangadhiya Kellendi Kannadiya Kanamdi Indharra Perandi Annakkili Annakkili Adi Alamarakkela Vannakkili Nallapadi Vazhacholli Indha Manna Koduthane Poorvakudi Kammankara Kaniyellam Padith Thirinjane Adhikkudi Nayi Nari Poonaikundhan Indha Erikkolam Kooda Sondhammadi Enjoy Enjami Vango Vango Onnagi Amma Yi Ambari Indha Indha Mummari Enjoy Enjami Vango Vango Onnagi Amma Yi Ambari Indha Indha Mummari Cuckoo Cuckoo Muttaiya Podum Kozhikku Cuckoo Cuckoo Oppanai Yaru Maiyilukku Cuckoo Cuckoo Pachchaiya Poosum Pasikku Cuckoo Cuckoo Kuchchiya Adukkuna Kootukku Padu Patta Makka Varappu Mettukkara Vervathanni Sokka Minukkum Nattukkara Akatti Karuppatti Oodhangolu Mannuchatti Athoram Koodukatti Arambichcha Nagareegam Jhan Jhana Jhanakku Jhana Makkale Uppuku Chappu Kottu Muttaikulla Saththukottu Attaikku Raththangkottu Kittipullu Vettu Vettu Nan Anju Maram Valarthen Azhagana Thottam Vachchen Thottam Sezhithalum En Thonda Nanaiyalaye En Kadale Karaye Vaname Saname Nelame Kolame Edame Thadame Enjoy Enjami Vango Vango Onnagi Amma Yi Ambari Indha Indha Mummari Enjoy Enjami Vango Vango Onnagi Amma Yi Ambari Indha Indha Mummari Pattan Poottan Kaththa Boomi Atam Pottu Kattum Sami Ratinandha Suththi Vandha Seva Koovuchu Adhu Pottu Vachcha Echamdhane Kada Marichu Namma Nada Marichu Indha Veeda Marichu Enna Kora Enna Kora En Seeni Karumbukku Enna Kora Enna Kora Enna Kora En Chella Perandikku Enna Kora Pandhalulla Pavarka Pandhalulla Pavarka Vedhakallu Vitturukku Vedhakallu Vitturukku Appan Atha Vittadhungo Appan Atha Vittandhungo Enjoy Enjami Vango Vango Onnagi Amma Yi Ambari Indha Indha Mummari Enjoy Enjami Vango Vango Onnagi Amma Yi Ambari Indha Indha Mummari Enjoy Enjami Vango Vango Onnagi Amma Yi Ambari Indha Indha Mummari Cuckoo Cuckoo	Cuckoo Cuckoo Grandpa Grandpa, the well has dried up Cuckoo Cuckoo, who stole the fish from the pond? Cuckoo Cuckoo, for the frog that jumps in the water Cuckoo Cuckoo, for the blanket worm’s younger sister Jasmine flowers bloom, don’t pluck them Search beyond, search further Jasmine flowers bloom, don’t touch them They are meant for each and every bud Turmeric-toned Paiyamma, lentil-loving Mattaiyamma Greens-picking Kaiyamma, buttermilk-giving Kottaiyamma Thaiyamma Thaiyamma what happened Mayamma? Valliamma’s descendants, a happy celebration The parrot in the mirror, Indhiran's descendant The sparrow, the wagtail, all came to greet The ancestors who cultivated the land of Nallapadi Vazhacholli The stories of Kammankara lineage have been passed down through generations I, a descendant of Poonaikundhan, sing this song of the land Enjoy, Enjaami, come, come, let’s go together Oh mother, this rhythm, this intoxicating beat! Enjoy, Enjaami, come, come, let’s go together Oh mother, this rhythm, this intoxicating beat! Cuckoo Cuckoo, for the hen that lays eggs Cuckoo Cuckoo, for the peacock, who is its companion? Cuckoo Cuckoo, for the snake that wears green Cuckoo Cuckoo, for the group that gathered after the win The unripe, raw mango, the wood apple, the palm fruit We were drawing water from the well with the rope Brown sugar candy, a sweet treat for everyone Like that started our flowing river To Jhan Jhan Jhanakku’s descendants, clap your hands Offer puffed rice to the ancestors, show your respect For the procession, tie up the chariot, cut the auspicious coconut, cut it! I was born and grew up in this land I have returned to the garden of my ancestors Even if I leave the garden, my roots will remain My lineage, my story is carved into this land Paddy, millet, all that we grew Enjoy, Enjaami, come, come, let’s go together Oh mother, this rhythm, this intoxicating beat! Enjoy, Enjaami, come, come, let’s go together Oh mother, this rhythm, this intoxicating beat! Land of the rich and the poor Where we worship the deity with devotion Ratinandha's nectar, a sacred offering The blessings we received, the troubles we forgot Our rhythm is gone, these tunes are fading What happened, my dear? For my dried palm fruit, what happened, my dear? What happened, my dear? For my dear younger sister, what happened, my dear? The pandal is up, the pandal is up The musicians are ready, the musicians are ready The father has passed on, the father has passed on Enjoy, Enjaami, come, come, let’s go together Oh mother, this rhythm, this intoxicating beat! Cuckoo Cuckoo

== Music video ==
The music video was directed by Amith Krishnan, who previously helmed many independent singles. Balaji Subramanyan filmed the visuals which took place in Arivu's hometown in Tiruvannamalai district. It was the first time Dhee has been on a music video for a performance of hers.

The music video opens with Parai drummers drumming along with women ululating, causing the Earth to shake. The video then cuts to a shot of Dhee uncovering her face, flanked by beautiful dancers all around her. The video mainly alternated between shots of Dhee and/or Arivu in a jungle-like set and in a dry field during the day and night, with the latter night scene being depicted as a celebratory bonfire party scene. Dhee is consistently depicted sitting on and standing beside a throne throughout the video and the video ends with Valliammal on a throne-like seat, alluding to Arivu's lyrics of celebrating a matriarchal society.

== Release ==
I didn’t expect maajja to release this first. And I haven’t worked with a label before; so, I had no idea about how things will work. But, they have been wellorganised and know how to launch an artiste. I suppose it’s this particular song (its theme) that led them to decide this would go first. I had been wanting to work on a song like this for long. Given the scale of the project, I knew it would work well.

"Enjoy Enjaami" is the first Tamil-language single to be released under Maajja. Arivu stated that the theme of the song the main reason behind the team's decision to release the single first. The song was released as a single through various music streaming platforms (Spotify, Jiosaavn, Gaana, Apple Music, iTunes, Amazon Music, Hungama, Raaga.com) on 7 March 2021. The same day, both Dhee and Arivu performed the song through the reality show Super Singer telecasted on Star Vijay. On 10 March 2021, the music video for the song was released through YouTube.

== Reception ==
=== Audience response ===
The song and its music video received viral response for the picturisation, visuals, direction and for its lyrics and tunes which was touted to be a "fun and inspiring number". Many internet memes praising the song were circulated through social media. It was widely praised by celebrities from the Tamil film industry including Dhanush, Sai Pallavi, Siddharth, Samantha, Vignesh Shivan, Dulquer Salmaan, Lokesh Kanagaraj, Pa. Ranjith, Selvaraghavan and also by the Indian Cricketer Ravichandran Ashwin. The composer Santhosh Narayanan praised the audience for their unconditional support towards the song. Dairy brand Amul recreated a poster featuring Dhee and Arivu with their mascots and also referred a pun to its lead singer Dhee, celebrating the song. To raise awareness about COVID-19, Chennai Railway Police performed to the song at Chennai Central Railway Station.

=== Critical review ===
Writing for The Hindu, Chennai-based critic Kavitha Muralidharan stated that "the song packs a punch with its vibrant frames and lyrics", further adding that "the timeless attachment to land, environment issues, the pain of the landless labourers and the love of nature, gives this seemingly easy earworm of a song both its depth and its rich character". A reviewer from The Indian Express called that the song "celebrates our shared existence with nature". Prathyush Parasuraman of Film Companion South stat that the song has "a kind of narrative storytelling, similar to Tamil’s Sangam Thinai poetry, where character and thus feeling is reflected in and thus subservient to nature and the landscape". Revathi Krishnan of ThePrint had called the song "talking about the feudal system, landless farmers and the caste system" had made people move over "Why This Kolaveri Di". A review from The Humming Heart called that "with this song, Tamil music seems to have begun to make the trudge away from vacuous songs masquerading as entertainment and towards message-driven art, albeit with the same visual adventurousness." The New Indian Express chief critic Hymathi M, listed it in one of the few songs that "used by listeners to comfort our mind and soul during pandemic times". Writing for The Wire, Sreenidhi Padmanabhan, a student at Jawaharlal Nehru University with her professor Ajith Kanna, stated that "the song is a remarkable lyrical and musical intervention that takes us one step closer to annihilating caste". Avinash Ramachandran of Cinema Express stated the song in his 'Jukebox 2021' review, adding that it "opened up mainstream Tamil cinema audiences to the idea of music videos as a separate entity".

=== Records ===
The song crossed more than 2 million streams in the music platform Spotify within two weeks. The video which released on 10 March 2021, had crossed more than 20 million views within the span of a week. It became the first non-film Tamil song to cross more than 100 million views (as of April 2021), and 4 million likes becoming the second Tamil song to achieve this feat. It further crossed 200 million views during the end of May 2021, and 270 million views as of June 2021. It was one of the Top 10 music videos from India being played on YouTube.

=== Chart performance ===
Weekly charts

Chart (2021)	Peak position
United Kingdom (Asian Music Chart Top 40)	5
iTunes India Charts	1
Spotify Top 200 (India)	3
Spotify Viral 50 (India)	5

== Controversies ==
=== Rolling Stone cover controversy ===
Despite the song's success, its contributor, rapper-cum-lyricist Arivu, was notably not included on the cover of the July 2021 edition of Rolling Stone India magazine, which included singer, Dhee, and rapper, Shan Vincent de Paul, with the latter being the lead performer on "Neeye Oli" for which Arivu contributed lyrics to. Pa. Ranjith criticised the executives of Rolling Stone India and music platform Maajja, for failing to credit the lyricist and interviewing him. Many netizens pointed about Arivu's erasure as a result of caste-based discrimination, since Arivu belonged to a marginalised Dalit household. Shan Vincent also came in support of Arivu, calling out Maajja for his erasure, but criticised Ranjith for creating a rift between the two Tamil rappers. Noel Kirthiraj, the CEO of Maajja, eventually responded that "The cover has nothing to do with the songs Enjoy Enjaami and Neeye Oli, but I understand the confusion as they were promoted along with it. When stories are written about Arivu and there is no mention of Dhee and Santhosh Narayanan, it is absolutely fine. Maajja’s intentions are quite clear and one thing Maajja won’t do is play politics or do something to please people." In response to the controversy, Rolling Stone subsequently released another cover of that magazine, featuring Arivu and other Maajja artists, in August 2021.

The controversies demonstrate that despite the song being set up to challenge socio-musical power relations within the musical economy, it reinforced the same caste hierarchy. This demonstrates that despite the potential of cross-border collaboration, there are still many limiting factors at play.

=== Chess Olympiad ===
The song was played at the inaugural ceremony of the 44th Chess Olympiad in Chennai, with Dhee and Kidakkuzhi Mariyammal performing. However, Arivu was not featured in the event, and was also not credited in the live performance. On 1 August 2022, Arivu wrote a detailed post on Instagram, saying that he took the sole responsibilities of songwriting, composition and performing the track, and nearly spent six months on the creation of the song. He further said: "... No doubt it’s a great team work. No doubt it calls everyone together. But it does not mean that's not the history of Valliammal or the landless Tea plantation slave ancestors of mine. Every song of mine will be having the scar mark of this generational oppression. Like this just on. There are 10000 songs of folk in this land. The Songs that carry the breath of ancestors, their pain, their life, love, their resistance and all about their existence. It’s all speaking to you in beautiful songs. Because we are a generation of blood and sweat turned into melodies of liberating arts." In response, Santhosh Narayanan stated on Twitter, adding that both Dhee and Arivu involved in the creative process of writing and composing the songs, while he was involved in the music production; later, Dhee also commented that she had always credited Arivu and Santosh for their roles in the creation of the song.

== DJ Snake remix ==
On the occasion of World Music Day (21 June 2021), global music streaming platform Spotify had collaborated with French DJ & Producer DJ Snake, to recreate this single for the platform's Spotify Singles; an initiative to provide a platform for artists to record and re-record their originals, which was welcomed as an opportunity for musicians to explore global music cultures and work with their counterparts. In order to launch this initiative in India, DJ Snake remixed the song with the original singer Dhee, blending "electronic dance music" with "distinctive styles influenced by the sounds native to Tamil Nadu". Dhee added that she was excited about being the first artist from India to be a part of the Spotify Singles program for her debut independent single, as was Santhosh Narayanan, the song producer. Varun Krishnan of The Indian Express wrote "The song is composed of distinctive styles that work together to create a sound like no other. DJ Snake’s EDM beats are well contrasted with Dhee’s vocals. Dhee delivers her part with much emphasis on rhythm and flow and the song is the personification of what a mashup of contrasting styles should be." This remixed version of the song was displayed in the Times Square Billboard in New York, becoming one of the first Tamil independent single to be showcased here.

== Credits ==
Credits adapted from Maajja

=== Video credits ===
- Director: Amith Krishnan
- Cinematographer : Balaji Subramanyam
- Choreography: Suren (The Dancers Club)
- Art Director: Siva Sankar
- Costume Designer: Pallavi Singh
- Stylist: Preksha Chordia
- Colourist: Arun Sangameshwar
- Direction Team: Manojkumar, Ramanathan Sathyamoorthy, Ashik Mohammed, Vishal Ravichandran
- Assistant Cinematographers: Vikram, Chandru, Santhosh, Varun
- Camera Assistant: Vignesh R
- Still Photography: Nirmal Vedhachalam
- Publicity Designs: Gautham J
- Production House: Studio MOCA

=== Song credits ===
- Composed, Arranged and Programmed by: Santhosh Narayanan, Arivu
- Singers: Arivu, Dhee
- Lyricist: Arivu
- Guitars: Keba Jeremiah, Chris Jason, Michael Murray
- Bass: Navien Napier
- Mouth Trumpet: Ganesh Kumar B
- Keys: Maarten Visser
- Harp: Seenu
- Cello: Balaji
- Percussions: RK Sundar
- Sound Engineers: Santhosh Narayanan, RK Sundar (Future Tense Studios), S. Sivakumar, Pradeep Menon, Krishnan Subramanian, Manoj Raman, Aravind MS (AM Studios), Prithvi Chandrashekhar (Krimson Avenue Studios), Sai Shravanam (Resound India)
- Mixed and Mastered by: Santhosh Narayanan (Future Tense Studios), Sai Shravanam (Resound India)
- Additional Studio Mixing: P. A. Deepak (AM Studios)
- Mastered for iTunes by: S. Sivakumar, Riyasdeen Riyan (AM Studios)
- Musicians Co-ordinator: Meenakshi Santhosh
