= Neeye Oli =

2021 song by Shan Vincent de Paul, Navz-47 and Santhosh Narayanan

Single by Shan Vincent de Paul, Navz-47 and Santhosh Narayanan

from the album Made in Jaffna
- Language: Tamil; English
- Released: 30 June 2021 (Single); 16 July 2021 (Music video)
- Recorded: 2017–2021
- Studio: Future Tense Studios; Studio MOCA
- Genre: Pop music, electronic dance music, rhythm and blues
- Length: 3:57
- Label: Maajja
- Composers: Shan Vincent de Paul; Santhosh Narayanan
- Lyricists: Shan Vincent de Paul; Arivu
- Producer: Shan Vincent de Paul

Shan Vincent de Paul singles chronology
"Savage" (2021)	"Neeye Oli" (2021)

Santhosh Narayanan singles chronology
"Enjoy Enjaami" (2021)	"Neeye Oli" (2021)

"Neeye Oli" (transl. You are the light) is a 2021 song composed by Santhosh Narayanan and Shan Vincent de Paul, who also recorded the track along with Navz-47; with lyrics for the track being written by Arivu and Shan Vincent de Paul. It is the second release from the studio album Made in Jaffna curated by Shan which was under production for four years. It released on 30 June 2021 by the music label/management Maajja, an independent platform launched by A. R. Rahman. The song is used as the theme track for Pa. Ranjith-directorial Sarpatta Parambarai.

== Premise ==
The song was picturised on the character Kabilan (Arya), who had his share of ups-and-downs in his life, but is eventually trying to bounce back with all his might. While writing the song, Shan had found it "easy to connect with the song because it was reflective of his journey" and considered it as him channeling the inner Muhammad Ali.

== Production ==
The song was one of the two singles being released from Made in Jaffna, curated by Shan Vincent de Paul for four years. The album song also featured composer Santhosh Narayanan who also worked on the track, along with Navz-47, whom Shan collaborated in the 2019 single "Heaven" which is also released on the same album. It also marked Santhosh's second release through the platform Maajja after the viral song "Enjoy Enjaami".

The song was pitched during Shan's tour to Chennai in 2019, where he eventually met composer Santhosh Narayanan. During the conversation, Santhosh sent the initial minutes of the song and told the idea and theme of this song, which Shan had liked it. The song marked their major collaboration for the album as Shan credited Santhosh that "he was the first major producer in India to bring him (Shan) into the Tamil music scene". The song was synced to the Pa. Ranjith-directorial Sarpatta Parambarai, being one of the two songs from the film.

== Music video ==
"For me, the visual was more so giving people a glimpse of this world I’m constantly creating. I consider myself a world creator, my art is not necessarily limited to music. Visuals are as important as the music, fashion is as important. I wanted to create this world where the ancient past meets a sci-fi distant future filled with interesting diaspora characters with black and brown characters in avant-garde fashion. This surreal, magical sci-fi world is what I was going for, and I’m still creating visuals I’m working on now. That’s what I wanted to introduce people to. The other important thing for me is to highlight fashion in general [...] It’s important for me to highlight those two specifically in this video."

— Shan Vincent de Paul about the music video of "Neeye Oli" and its themes.

The music video for the single is directed by Shan Vincent de Paul and Kalainithan Kalaichelvan. He added that "I wanted the aesthetic of this video to represent me and my collaborators, and fashion was that catalyst. This is Toronto meets Tamil Eelam. It's a place where couture meets the ancient past, avant-garde intersects with traditional gowns[...] it's the meeting point of all these different identities". The video song was filmed at Studio MOCA, in order to create a "fantastical sci-fi world driven by fashion". As of September 2021, the promotional video song of "Neeye Oli" featured about 2.8 million views in YouTube.

The music video was nominated for the 2022 Juno Award for "Video of the Year".

== Film version ==
For the film Sarpatta Parambarai, Santhosh composed a different set of strophe without the rap versions crooned by Shan Vincent (in English) and Navz-47, but featured vocals by Santhosh himself, with Arivu writing the lyrics. However, the original version was also featured in the end credits of the film.

== Track listing ==
1. "Neeye Oli" (Original) by Shan Vincent de Paul, Navz-47 and Santhosh Narayanan – 3:57
2. "Neeye Oli" (Film Version) by Santhosh Narayanan – 4:28

== Rolling Stone cover issue ==
On 20 August 2021, the magazine Rolling Stone India published a cover edition for the month July 2021, featuring the singer Shan Vincent de Paul and Dhee, who gained immense popularity after the song "Enjoy Enjaami". However, Arivu, the co-contributor of these songs were not featured in the edition. This gained the attention from Pa. Ranjith, who went on criticise the executives of the magazine and music platform Maajja, for failing to credit the lyricist and interviewing him. Netizens pointed Arivu's erasure as a significant example of caste-based discrimination as he belonged to the marginalised Dalit community.

Shan Vincent also came in support for Arivu, calling out Maajja for his removal, but also criticised Pa. Ranjith for creating a rift between the artists. He released the rap song titled "Take Cover" which had verses criticising the director, for not including his version in the film Sarpatta Parambarai, and had denied composer Santhosh Narayanan's requests on his inclusion in the album. Following the controversy, Rolling Stone India published another edition in August 2021, featuring Arivu and other artists, that following week.

Noel Kirthiraj, CEO of Maajja, released a statement in response to the issue regarding Arivu's erasure, saying:

The cover has nothing to do with the songs Enjoy Enjaami and Neeye Oli, but I understand the confusion as they were promoted along with it. When stories are written about Arivu and there is no mention of Dhee and Santhosh Narayanan, it is absolutely fine. Maajja’s intentions are quite clear and one thing Maajja won’t do is play politics or do something to please people."

== Personnel ==
Credits adapted from Maajja

- Shan Vincent de Paul – Vocalist, composer, album producer, lyricist
- Santhosh Narayanan – Composer, album producer, playback singer, sound engineer (Future Tense Studios, Chennai)
- Navz-47 – Playback singer
- Arivu – Lyricist
- Joseph Vijay – Guitar
- RK Sundar – Sound engineer (Future Tense Studios, Chennai), percussions, drums
- Sai Shravanam – Sound engineer (Resound India, Chennai), audio mixing, mastering
- Pranav Muniraj – Additional programming, music supervision
- Meenakshi Santhosh – Music co-ordinator
