= Anweshippin Kandethum =

- Theatrical release poster
- Directed by: Darwin Kuriakose
- Written by: Jinu V. Abraham
- Produced by: Darwin Kuriakose; Dolwin Kuriakose; Jinu V Abraham; Vikram Mehra; Siddarth Anand Kumar
- Starring: Tovino Thomas
- Cinematography: Gautham Sankar
- Edited by: Saiju Sreedharan
- Music by: Santhosh Narayanan
- Production companies: Yoodlee Films; Theatre of Dreams
- Release date: 9 February 2024 (India)
- Running time: 145 minutes
- Country: India
- Language: Malayalam
- Budget: ₹8 crore
- Box office: ₹40 crore

Anweshippin Kandethum (transl. Seek, and you shall find) is a 2024 Indian Malayalam-language police procedural drama film directed by Darwin Kuriakose and written by Jinu V. Abraham. The film is produced by Darwin and Dolwin Kuriakose. The film features Tovino Thomas in the lead role, alongside Indrans, Siddique, Shammi Thilakan, Sadiq, Azees Nedumangad, and Baburaj in the supporting roles. The soundtrack was composed by Santhosh Narayanan, in his Malayalam cinema debut.

The film received positive response from critics and audiences, who praised the cast performances, the story, soundtrack, direction, art and set design. The film was a commercial hit at the box office.

== Plot ==
Anweshippin Kandethum delves into two murder cases investigated by an honest and straightforward police officer named SI Anand and his team.

It begins with Anand's return to duty after a short and unexpected suspension, only to be thrust into the heart of a complex mystery. Then it moves to flashback.

The flashbacks reveal Anand's journey into the police force, guided by his retired police officer father, Narayana Pillai. Anand is posted as the Sub Inspector at Kottayam police station. His first case involves the disappearance of a Christian girl, Lovely Mathan. During the investigation, Anand finds out that Lovely often frequented a nearby vicarage. Anand reaches the vicarage to question the priest but his investigations is resisted by parishioners. Considering the religious angle of the case and religious sensitivities, Anand is removed from the investigation and DYSP Alex, a corrupt police officer leads the investigation, who comes to the conclusion that the murder was done by an ex-criminal, who lived nearby the Mathans. However, Anand with the help of some of his subordinates, forensic experts, and his superior officer, SP Rajagopal, finds the real culprits of the case, When he arrests the culprit and brings him to the court, the culprit escapes from the police custody and commits suicide by jumping in front of a running train. Anand and his team are suspended from duty for their oversight and negligence by a helpless Rajagopal who actually understood what really happened, but had no other way.

Back to the present, Rajagopal assigns Anand to investigate a cold murder case of a young woman called Sridevi. The investigation begins at Cheruvally, and is thwarted by villagers and village leaders who were at the receiving end of police brutality when the murder was first investigated. The villagers are hostile and uncooperative to the investigation, except for Raveendran Nair, a retired police constable, who was in service at the time of the case. Raveendran also gives them overview of the murder, Anand finally identifies the culprit as Raveendran. However, Raveendran commits suicide by hanging before they can arrest him. Hence, they still wait to redeem himself.

== Cast ==
- Tovino Thomas as SI Anand Narayanan Pillai
- Siddique as Kottayam SP C. K. Rajagopal IPS
- Baburaj as P. V. Pailo, Cheruvally Panchayat President
- Sadiq as Retired Head Constable Raveendran Nair
- Shammi Thilakan as Sadanandan Cheruvally / Sadanandan Aashaan
- Vineeth Thattil David as PC Chandra Senan "Senan"
- Pramod Veliyanad as PC K.R Sukumaran
- Rahul Rajagopal as PC Kabeer Hassan
- Indrans as DYSP Krishnan Unni (SIT)
- Harisree Ashokan as Postman Chandran
- Arthana Binu as Sreedevi
- Anagha Maya Ravi as Lovely Maathan
- Manesh Kumar as Sudeep Nair
- Kottayam Nazeer as DYSP Alex Mambara
- Azees Nedumangad as CI Simon Idikkula
- Nandhu as Head Constable Uthup
- Kunhikannan Cheruvathur as IG Sundaran Nadar IPS
- Nishanth Sagar as Panchayat Member Koruth
- Vettukili Prakash as Maathan, Lovely's father
- Maanushi Khair as Blessy Maathan, Lovely's elder sister
- Ramya Suvi as Revamma, Sreedevi's mother
- Vishnu G Varrier as Deacon Nathaniel "Danny" Johnson, Blessy's lover
- Madhupal as Priest Fr. Thomas
- Prem Prakash as Forensic Surgeon Prabhullachandran
- Thejaswini as Lovely's younger sister
- Vijilesh as Puzhukku
- Aswathi Manoharan as PC Lathika
- Anjali Krishna as Renuka
- Thomas as Narayanan Pillai, Anand's father and retired police officer
- Prithviraj Sukumaran as Narrator in the end credits

== Reception ==
A critic from The Times of India wrote that "Anveshippin Kandethum offers a gripping narrative and compelling performances, it prompts reflection on the recurring theme of crimes against women in Malayalam cinema thrillers". A critic from The Indian Express wrote that "director Darwin and writer Jinu manage to ensure that they don’t lose viewers’ attention at any point, as the film seldom deviates its focus from the crimes by introducing unnecessary drama". A critic from The Hindu wrote that "Anveshippin Kandethum is an engaging entertainer with a gripping narrative, despite being slow in parts". A critic from Hindustan Times wrote that "Anweshippin Kandethum is director Darwin Kuriakose’s debut film and he has managed to deliver a decent crime thriller in his first attempt".
