= Shan Vincent de Paul =

Canadian musician

SVDP
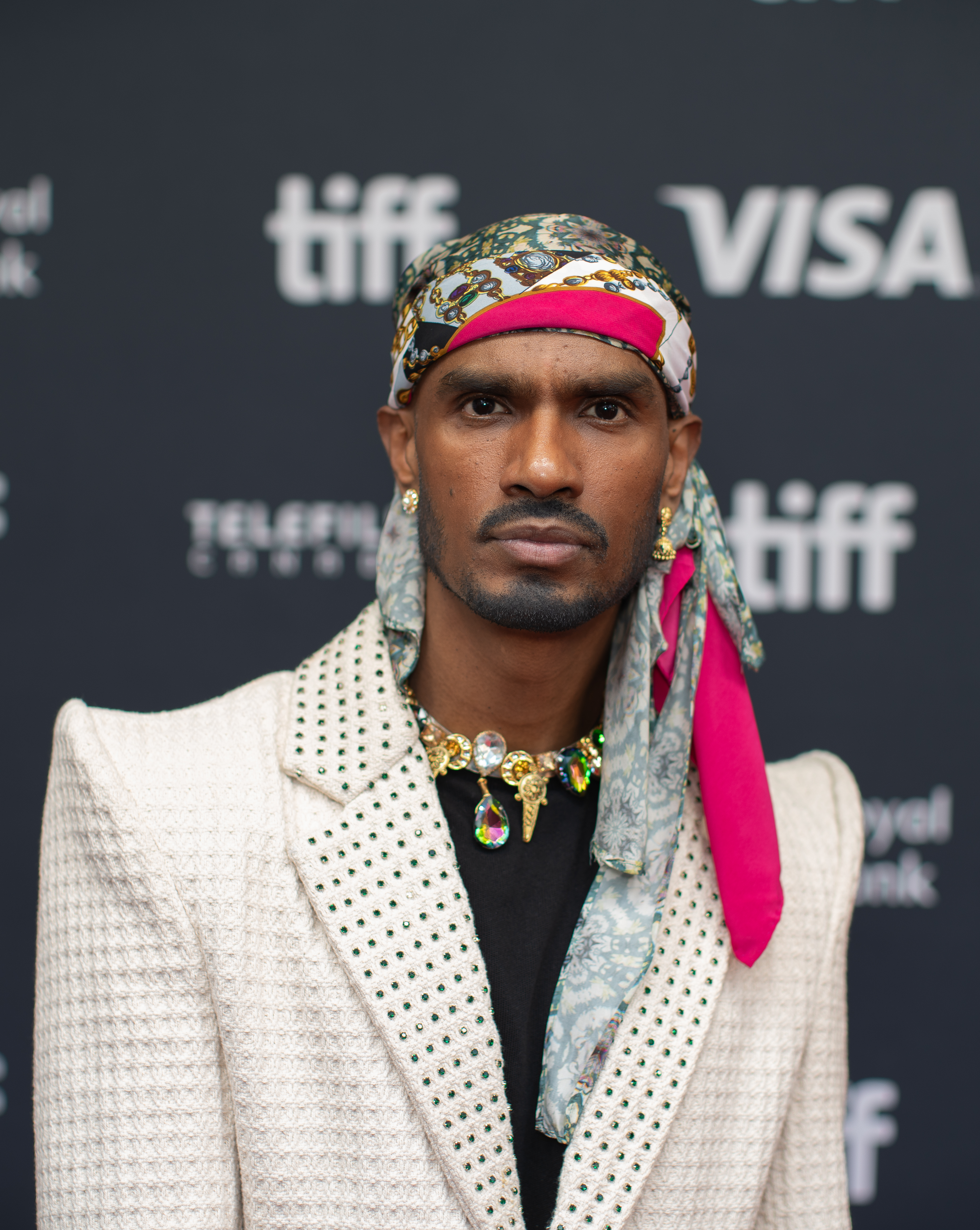
- Vincent de Paul in 2024

Background information
- Born: Shan Vincent de Paul; Jaffna, Sri Lanka
- Origin: Toronto, Canada
- Genres: Hip-hop; electronic; pop; indie
- Occupations: Rapper; singer-songwriter; Music video director
- Years active: 2000–present
- Labels: sideways; maajja
- Website: shanvincentdepaul.com

Shan Vincent de Paul (SVDP) is a Sri Lankan-born Tamil Canadian recording artist and director from Toronto. Paul released his debut album "Saviors" in 2016 and his second album "Trigger Happy Heartbreak" along with an EP "SVDP 1" in 2017.

He is part of Toronto-based artist collective, sideways which includes Coleman Hell, La+ch, Mad Dog Jones, and Michah. He is best known for his debut album "Saviors".

== Personal life and career ==
SVDP was born to a Tamil family in Jaffna, Sri Lanka and fled the country in his young age due to the civil war and moved to Canada as refugees.

His debut album "Saviors" was released on April 15, 2016.

SVDP has been featured in media outlets such as Highsnobiety, Complex, BBC, CBC, DJBOOTH, Okayplayer, Afropunk, Clash Magazine, and Torontist.

He has also composed music for the television series Sort Of. Alongside Emily Persich, Moël, Terrell Morris, Ceréna and Vivek Shraya, he won a Canadian Screen Award for Best Original Music in a Comedy Series at the 11th Canadian Screen Awards in 2023.

== Discography ==
=== Studio albums ===
Title	Studio album details
Saviors	Released: April 15, 2016; Label: sideways; Format: Digital download, streaming
Trigger Happy Heartbreak	Released: December 1, 2017; Label: sideways; Format: Digital download, streaming
SVDP 2	Released: August 16, 2019; Label: sideways; Format: Digital download, streaming
Kothu Boys (with Yanchan)	Released: November 6, 2020; Label: sideways, Dirty Elephant; Format: Digital download, streaming
Made in Jaffna	Released: September 3, 2021; Label: sideways, maajja; Format: Digital download, streaming

=== Singles ===
Year	Title	Collaborators / Notes
2014	"Some Girls"	
2015	"Symbiotic"	
2015	"Crash"	
2015	"Outta Love"	
2015	"The Island"	
2016	"Thank God"	
2016	"Humble"	
2016	"Fight for Us"	Featuring La+ch & Coleman Hell
2016	"Buggin'"	
2018	"Light"	
2019	"Out Alive"	
2019	"Warning Shot"	
2019	"Zen"	
2019	"Funeral"	
2019	"Ex Xo"	
2019	"Heaven"	Featuring Navz-47
2021	"Savage"	
2021	"Amnesia"	Featuring Ami
2021	"Hard Times"	Featuring TiKA, Produced by La+ch
2021	"Neeye Oli"	Featuring Navz-47, Produced by Santhosh Narayanan
2021	"Uyire"	With Yanchan
2022	"Aiyo!"	
2023	"Cricket Rap"	From Dasara, Produced by Santhosh Narayanan
2024	"Burnout The Engine"	From Turbo, Produced by Christo Xavier
2025	"The One"	From Retro, Produced by Santhosh Narayanan; sung in Tamil, Telugu, Malayalam, Hindi and Kannada versions

== Awards and nominations ==
Year	Awards	Category	Nominated work	Result
2007	Ontario Independent Music Awards	Best Hip-Hop Song		Nominated
2008	Toronto Independent Music Awards	Best Urban Act		Nominated
2009	Independent Music Awards (US)	Best Rap/Hip-Hop Album		Nominated
2011	Toronto Independent Music Awards	Best Rap		Won
2012	Toronto Independent Music Awards	Best Rap		Nominated
2016	Independent Music Awards	Best Rap/Hip-Hop Album		Nominated
2016	Independent Music Awards	Best Rap/Hip-Hop Song		Won
2022	Juno Awards	Video of the Year	"Neeye Oli" with Kalainithan Kalaichelvan	Nominated

== Concert tours ==
Headlining

- OH GAWD! Tour (2020) (with Yanchan and DJ Dwell)
