= Santhosh Narayanan =

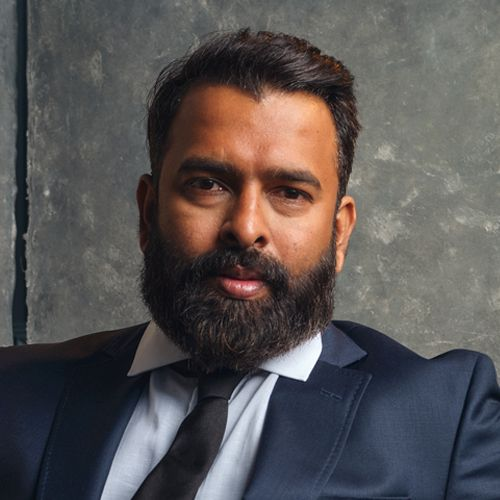
- Santhosh Narayanan

Background information
- Born: 15 May 1983 (age 43); Tiruchirappalli, Tamil Nadu, India
- Genres: Film score; Jazz; Indian folk; Hip hop; Rock; Electronic
- Occupations: Composer; music producer; arranger; singer; music director
- Instruments: vocals, piano, flute, keyboard, trumpet
- Years active: 2012–present

Santhosh Narayanan (born 15 May 1983) is an Indian film composer, music producer and singer, primarily active in Tamil cinema, also having composed for notable Telugu and Malayalam films. Narayanan made his debut as an independent composer with the 2012 film Attakathi, directed by Pa. Ranjith. His further collaborations with directors Pa. Ranjith, Karthik Subbaraj, and Mari Selvaraj have resulted in celebrated scores for films such as Pizza (2012), Jigarthanda (2014), Kabali (2016), Vada Chennai (2018), Pariyerum Perumal (2018), Sarpatta Parambarai (2021), Karnan (2021), and Kalki 2898 AD (2024). Narayanan is considered a prominent figure in contemporary South Indian film music.

== Early life ==
Santhosh Narayanan was born in Tiruchirappalli, India. He is the younger of two children. He was educated at RSK Higher Secondary School, Tiruchirappalli. Santhosh Narayanan completed his Bachelor of Engineering in Computer Science at J. J. College of Engineering and Technology, Tiruchirappalli.

After completing his education, he worked as a recording engineer, arranger and programmer, before beginning to produce independent music and compose for films. He composed the music including two original songs for the Telugu short film Advaitham, He was also part of the contemporary folk music band "La Pongal" in which he performed in a few live shows in 2009.

Through Mani Ratnam, Santhosh also got to work on a couple of A. R. Rahman soundtracks starting with Guru (2007).

== Career ==
=== 2012–2013: Debut success ===
He made his debut as an independent music director in the 2012 Tamil film Attakathi directed by Pa. Ranjith. He got the opportunity through its producer C. V. Kumar who saw him working in his studio. Santhosh composed a song in the Gaana genre for the film, "Aadi Pona Aavani", and gave a then-unknown Gana Bala, who had been singing gaana songs at funerals until then, the chance to sing it. Along with "Aadi Pona Aavani", a second gaana song, "Nadukadalula Kappala" was recorded for the film. Both songs went on to become popular, making Gana Bala a star, and were said to have brought back gaana to Tamil cinema. Sify wrote that the gaana songs were "one of the major highlight of the film" and Behindwoods called the Attakathi album an "experimental yet fresh attempt". Following Attakathi, he composed the music for the films Uyir Mozhi and Pizza, the directorial debuts of Raja and Karthik Subbaraj, respectively. All three albums, Attakathi, Uyir Mozhi and Pizza were recorded and mastered by Leon Zervos at Studios 301 in Sydney Australia; furthermore, the Sydney Symphony Orchestra had performed for the soundtrack of Pizza, which also saw Santhosh collaborating with Gana Bala again, albeit on a Blues number this time. For Uyir Mozhi, some of the songs Santhosh had scored for a private album were used by the director. Santhosh's work in Pizza was positively reviewed. According to Sify, Santhosh Narayanan's music was a "major plus" of the film, and IBN Live described the score as "splendid". The song "Mogathirai" from the soundtrack album was also listed by Indiaglitz.com in their Top songs from 2012 list. Behindwoods at the end of 2012 wrote, "Santosh Narayanan brought a different sound to Tamil cinema this year. Even his gaana tracks in Attakathi were freshly produced and the soundtrack of Pizza was eclectic to say the least". He also won accolades that year: the Jaya TV 2012 award for Sensational Debutant Music Director for Attakathi, and the Big Tamil Melody Award for Best Debut Music director for Pizza. He worked on the black comedy film Soodhu Kavvum directed by the Director Nalan Kumarasamy next. Gana Bala was given a "gana-rap" in the film, "Kaasu Panam", which went on to become one of the most popular songs of the year. His work in the film earned him the Vijay Award for Best Background Score. His other releases of 2013 were Pizza 2: The Villa, a sequel to Pizza, and Billa Ranga, his first Telugu and only full-fledged Telugu project until 2023's Dasara.

=== 2014–2015 ===
Santhosh Narayanan worked exclusively on Tamil films. He had four soundtracks released that year, the first being the album to the romantic drama Cuckoo. Cuckoo's soundtrack was highly appreciated by critics who called it an "alluring and immersive album" and "the best soundtrack that composer Santhosh Narayanan has produced yet". The song "Manasula Soora Kaathey" from the album reached number one position in the Tunes all India charts, while Outlook named it one of South India's top songs of the year. The score received equal praise with Baradwaj Rangan terming it as "great", IANS as "life-affirming", Rediff as "sensational" and Sify as "outstanding". The next release was Karthik Subbaraj's second directorial, Jigarthanda, which was promoted as a "musical gangster story". While Cuckoo featured live instrumentation, Santhosh Narayanan used electronic musical instruments for the recording in Jigarthanda, who recorded almost all the songs in a studio in Sydney, Australia for nearly two months. The soundtrack and score featured a melange and fusion of several genres, including Gangsta rap, folk, electro. His work was well received again; while The Times of India, in its album review, wrote that "Santhosh Narayanan shows, yet again, that he is one of those composers to watch out for — both for his new sounds and tunes", The Hindu's Baradwaj Rangan stated that "his flamboyant score imbues even the weaker scenes with a Tarantinoesque swagger". After Jigarthanda, he worked on the action-drama film Madras. The Hindu described his score as "excellent". The soundtrack to Enakkul Oruvan, the Tamil remake of the Kannada film Lucia, for which he had composed the score, was his final 2014 release. The album was also lauded by critics. Behindwoods named him the "most promising among the younger composers".

In 2015, he worked on 36 Vayadhinile, the Tamil remake of the Malayalam film How Old Are You. Upcoming projects of Santhosh Narayanan include the next films of directors Karthik Subbaraj and Nalan Kumarasamy. In 2016, he composed songs for Sudha Kongara's bilingual sports drama Irudhi Suttru(filmed simultaneously in Hindi as Saala Khadoos). The Hindi adaptation film, "Saala Khadoos" however did not feature background score by Santhosh as Rajkumar Hirani, the co-producer of the film brought in composers Sanjay Wandrekar and Atul Raninga who had worked with him in 3 Idiots and PK to compose the background score. Kashmora to be directed by Gokul, and Manithan were his other noted released in 2016 apart from Kabali, the biggest Tamil project so far in his career. In 2016, a music critic from The Hindu labelled Narayanan as one of the three in "the new-age musical trio of Tamil cinema" alongside Sean Roldan and Pradeep Kumar.

=== 2016 ===
The year 2016 was one of the most packed years for Santhosh Narayanan. Six releases during the year including music compositions for Iruthi Suttru, Manithan, Kadhalum Kadanthu Pogum, Iraivi, Kabali, Kaashmora, Kodi.

In 2017, he composed for the Vijay-starrer Bairavaa. Santhosh's next release was as a guest composer, in the film Meyaadha Maan, a production venture of his Karthik Subbaraj. In May 2017, Santhosh signed for Kaala, his second film for Superstar Rajinikanth. In 2018 he gave scored Karthik Subbarraj's silent thriller film Mercury and Vetrimaaran's Vada Chennai, the latter being Santhosh's 25th as a composer. In 2020 with new projects which were Kasada Thapara, Jeeva starrer Gypsy and Penguin.

=== 2021-present ===
He was involved with Dulquer Salmaan's 2021 Malayalam film Salute, before being replaced by Jakes Bejoy. He also composed the soundtrack and film's score for Sarpatta Parambarai; It marked the composer's fifth consecutive film with Pa. Ranjith, since his and the director's debut film Attakathi (2012). According to Santhosh, he said that "the film is influenced by the aspects of Madras, as it is mostly about the descriptive and realistic portrayal of North Chennai, while the boxing culture during the 1970s also serve as the subplot". He worked with Maajja on independent music such as "Enjoy Enjami" sung by Arivu, his Daughter Dhee and himself which clocked 19 million views within one week of release making it the highest watched Tamil music video album, and has garnered at least 510 million views. He also worked on the song "Neeye Oli" sung by rappers Shan Vincent de Paul, Navz-47 and himself. "Neeye Oli" also featured in Sarpatta Parambarai as the theme song. His latest releases are Anel Meley Pani Thuli, Gulu Gulu and Buffoon in Tamil, Kalki 2898 AD in Telugu and Pathonpatham Noottandu and Anweshippin Kandethum in Malayalam. Narayanan made his Bollywood debut in Salman Khan's film Sikandar, for which he composed the background score. In October 2025, he featured on singer-songwriter Ed Sheeran's EP, Play (The Remixes), alongside Dhee and rapper Hanumankind.

== Discography ==
Year	Film	Songs	Score	Language	Notes
2008	Nenu Meeku Telusa?	No	Yes	Telugu	Additional background score only
2013	Lucia	No	Yes	Kannada	Additional background score only. Santhosh opted out after composing two themes.
2012	Attakathi	Yes	Yes	Tamil	
2012	Uyir Mozhi	Yes	Yes	Tamil	Unreleased film
2012	Pizza	Yes	Yes	Tamil	
2013	Soodhu Kavvum	Yes	Yes	Tamil	Vijay Award for Best Background Score; Nominated—Vijay Award for Best Music Director; Nominated—South Indian International Movie Award for Best Music Director
2013	Pizza II: Villa	Yes	Yes	Tamil	
2014	Cuckoo	Yes	Yes	Tamil	Mirchi Award For Best Album of the Year
2014	Billa Ranga	Yes	Yes	Telugu	Debut in Telugu cinema
2014	Jigarthanda	Yes	Yes	Tamil	Vijay Award for Best Background Score
2014	Madras	Yes	Yes	Tamil	
2015	Enakkul Oruvan	Yes	Yes	Tamil	Remake of Lucia
2015	36 Vayathinile	Yes	Yes	Tamil	
2016	Irudhi Suttru; Saala Khadoos	Yes	No	Tamil; Hindi	
2016	Kadhalum Kadandhu Pogum	Yes	Yes	Tamil	
2016	Manithan	Yes	Yes	Tamil	
2016	Iraivi	Yes	Yes	Tamil	
2016	Kabali	Yes	Yes	Tamil	
2016	Kodi	Yes	Yes	Tamil	
2016	Kaashmora	Yes	Yes	Tamil	
2017	Bairavaa	Yes	Yes	Tamil	
2017	Guru	Yes	Yes	Telugu	Remake of Iruthi Suttru and Saala Khadoos
2017	Server Sundaram	Yes	Yes	Tamil	Unreleased film
2018	Kaala	Yes	Yes	Tamil	
2018	Mercury	Yes	Yes	Tamil	Guest composer; 1 song only
2018	Dhwaja	Yes	Yes	Kannada	Remake of Kodi
2018	Pariyerum Perumal	Yes	Yes	Tamil	
2018	Vada Chennai	Yes	Yes	Tamil	25th Film
2019	A1	Yes	Yes	Tamil	
2019	Otha Seruppu Size 7	Yes	No	Tamil	Guest composer; 1 song only
2020	Gypsy	Yes	Yes	Tamil	
2020	Penguin	Yes	Yes	Tamil	
2021	Parris Jeyaraj	Yes	Yes	Tamil	
2021	Karnan	Yes	Yes	Tamil	
2021	Jagame Thanthiram	Yes	Yes	Tamil	
2021	Vellai Yaanai	Yes	Yes	Tamil	
2021	Sarpatta Parambarai	Yes	Yes	Tamil	
2021	Navarasa	Yes	Yes	Tamil	
2021	Kasada Thapara	Yes	No	Tamil	Streaming release; Guest composer; 1 song only
2022	Mahaan	Yes	Yes	Tamil	
2022	Kadaisi Vivasayi	Yes	Yes	Tamil	
2022	Gulu Gulu	Yes	Yes	Tamil	
2022	Buffoon	Yes	Yes	Tamil	
2022	Anel Meley Pani Thuli	Yes	Yes	Tamil	
2022	Naai Sekar Returns	Yes	Yes	Tamil	
2022	Pathonpatham Noottandu	No	Yes	Malayalam	
2023	Dasara	Yes	Yes	Telugu	Nominated—South Indian International Movie Award for Best Music Director; Nominated— Best Music Director – Telugu
2023	Chithha	Yes	No	Tamil	Guest composer; 1 song only Won: Filmfare Award for Best Music Director - Tamil
2023	Jigarthanda DoubleX	Yes	Yes	Tamil	
2024	Saindhav	Yes	Yes	Telugu	
2024	Yatra 2	Yes	Yes	Telugu	
2024	Anweshippin Kandethum	Yes	Yes	Malayalam	
2024	Kalki 2898 AD	Yes	Yes	Telugu	50th Film
2024	Andhagan	Yes	Yes	Tamil	
2024	Vaazhai	Yes	Yes	Tamil	
2024	Pani	Yes	Yes	Malayalam	
2025	Sikandar	No	Yes	Hindi	
2025	Retro	Yes	Yes	Tamil	Also appears as Innisai in the song "Kanimaa" (special appearance)
2025	Thalaivan Thalaivii	Yes	Yes	Tamil	
2026	Vaa Vaathiyaar	Yes	Yes	Tamil	
2026	Maa Inti Bangaaram	Yes	Yes	Telugu	
2026	Balaramana Dinagalu	Yes	Yes	Kannada	
2026	Seyon †	Yes	Yes	Tamil	
2026	Power House †	Yes	Yes	Tamil	
2027	Jackie †	Yes	Yes	Tamil	
TBA	Kalki 2898 AD: Part 2 †	Yes	Yes	Telugu	

=== Television ===
Year	Series	Language	Notes
2022	Pettaikaali	Tamil	Aha series
2022	Faadu	Hindi	SonyLIV series
2023	The Night Manager	Hindi	Title song only

=== As a playback singer ===
Year	Film	Songs	Language	Composer
2014	Kappal	"Kaali Pasanga"	Tamil	Natarajan Sankaran
2014	Jigarthanda	"Baby", "Dhesayum Ezhundhaney"	Tamil	Himself
2015	Enakkul Oruvan	"Endi Ippadi"	Tamil	Himself
2015	36 Vayathinile	"Naalu Kazhudha"	Tamil	Himself
2016	Kadhalum Kadandhu Pogum	"Ka Ka Ka Po", "Bongu Kichan"	Tamil	Himself
2016	Remo	"Daavuya"	Tamil	Anirudh Ravichander
2016	Iraivi	"Kaadhal Kappal"	Tamil	Himself
2016	Kaashmora	"Dhikku Dhikku sir"	Tamil	Himself
2017	Server Sundaram	"Bro"	Tamil	Himself
2017	Meyaadha Maan	"Address song"	Tamil	Himself
2017	Vizhithiru	"Pon Vidhi"	Tamil	Sathyan Mahalingam
2018	Pariyerum Perumal	"Karuppi", "Naan Yaar"	Tamil	Himself
2019	A1	"Chittukku"	Tamil	Himself
2020	Gypsy	"Very Very Bad","Desanthiri"	Tamil	Himself
2020	Dagaalty	"Kotha Kothudhu Bodhai"	Tamil	Vijay Narain
2020	Jagame Thandhiram	"Rakita Rakita Rakita", "Aala Ola", "Naan Thaan Da Mass", "Bujji"	Tamil	Himself
2021	Master	"Polakattum Para Para"	Tamil	Anirudh Ravichander
2021	Parris Jeyaraj	"Bacha Bachikey"	Tamil	Himself
2021	Karnan	"Kandaa Vara Sollunga", "Uttradheenga Yeppov"	Tamil	Himself
2021	Sarpatta Parambarai	"Neeye Oli" (Film version)	Tamil	Himself
2021	Mahaan	"Naan Naan" "Soorayattam", "Evanda Enakku Custody"	Tamil	Himself
2021	Kasada Thapara	"Vaazhvome"	Tamil	Himself
2021	Kadaisi Vivasayi	"Enniko Er Pudichane", "Bambara Boomi"	Tamil	Himself
2022	Anbarivu	"Ready Steady Go"	Tamil	Hiphop Tamizha
2022	Buffoon	"Madichu Vecha Vethala"	Tamil	Himself
2022	Kaathuvaakula Rendu Kadhal	"Kaathuvaakula Rendu Kadhal"	Tamil	Anirudh Ravichander
2022	Gulu Gulu	"Maatna Gaali", "Inner Peace", "Amma Nah Nah"	Tamil	Himself
2022	Thiruchitrambalam	"Thenmozhi"; Best Male Playback Singer – Tamil	Tamil	Anirudh Ravichander
2023	Dasara	"Ori Vaari"	Telugu	Himself
2023	Dasara	"Dhoom Dhaam Dhosthu", "Theekari"	Tamil	Himself
2023	Chithha	"Unakku Thaan"	Tamil	Himself
2023	Jigarthanda DoubleX	"Maamadura"	Tamil	Himself
2023	Jigarthanda DoubleX	"Kora Meesam"	Telugu	Himself
2023	Jigarthanda DoubleX	"Theekuchi"	Tamil	Himself
2023	Jigarthanda DoubleX	"Oyyaram"	Tamil	Himself
2024	Lover	"Usura Uruvi"	Tamil	Sean Roldan
2024	Raayan	"Water Packet"	Tamil	A. R. Rahman
2024	Yezhu Kadal Yezhu Malai	"Yezhezhu Malai"	Tamil	Yuvan Shankar Raja
2025	Retro	"Kannadi Poove", "Kanimaa", "The One"	Tamil	Himself
2026	Vaa Vaathiyaar	"Mu Dha La Li"	Tamil	Himself
2026	Couple Friendly	"Gaabara Gaabara"	Telugu	Aditya Ravindran
2026	Scene	"Raasadhi Raasan"	Tamil	Sushin Shyam
