= The Casteless Collective =

Indian music band

- Origin: Chennai, India
- Genres: Tamil- Indie
- Years active: 2017 - present
- Label: Independent
- Members: Tenma; Muthu; Bala Chandar; Isaivani; Arivu; Chellamuthu; Dharani; Sarath; Gautham; Nandhan Kalaivanan; Manu Krishnan; Sahib Singh

The Casteless Collective is an Indian indie band based in Chennai, Tamil Nadu. The band was formed in 2017, with support from the Neelam Panpaatu Maiyam started by filmmaker Pa. Ranjith and filmmaker and film composer Tenma, founder of the label Madras Records.

== Early years and band formation ==
Tenma, the leader and the music producer of the band was trying to put together a group of indie musicians and artists, the Madras Indie Collective, in 2017 when he received a call from Neelam's Pa. Ranjith, enquiring if he could train Gaana singers and musicians from the Gaana genre. They put out calls for an audition and received about 150 applications. Since the band was embarking on a socio-political journey, the auditions were looking to understand the motivations of the performers, as much as their musical strengths. A blend of Gaana, hip-hop, rock, rap, and folk musicians were among the ~19 singers who formed the initial ensemble.

The band's name originates from the usage, Jaathi Illadha Tamizhargal, a phrase coined by 19th century anti caste activist and writer C. Iyothee Thass, who urged Dalits across Tamilnadu to register themselves without caste. The name of the band was inspired by a phrase – "jaathi bedha matra Tamilargal" – used by Tamil anti-caste activist and writer C Iyothee Thass. Iyothee Thassa Pandithar (1845-1914) was the first to moot the phrase "Jaathi Bedha Matra Tamizhargal" in the early 20th century by publishing the same in his Tamil Journal Tamizhan (1907-1914).

The band's music is political, and their songs rebel against the inequality of the caste system, and the oppression of women and minorities by the state. The current lineup consists of 19 members including Tenma, leader and music producer, singers Muthu, Bala Chandar, Isaivani, Arivu and Chellamuthu, Dharani (Dholak), Sarath (Satti), Gautham (Katta molam), Nandhan Kalaivanan (Parai and Tavil), Manu Krishnan (drums) and Sahib Singh (guitar).

As of November 2019, the band had released thirty-five songs. In 2020 Gaana singer, Isaivani, who is the only woman in the band was recognised for her role by the BBC. She was included in the BBC's 100 Women because she inspires others because she has sung and performed for a long time in a space that is dominated by men.

The "Magizhchi" video song album, directed by Pa Ranjith, features choreography by Sandy Master and costumes designed by Prince Phinehas.

== Singles ==
- Jai Bhim Anthem - 2018
- Quota - 2018
- Magizhchi - 2018
- Vada Chennai - 2018
- Thalaiva - 2019
- Dabba Dabba - 2019

== Albums ==
- Magizhchi - 2018
