= Arivu =

Indian rapper and lyricist

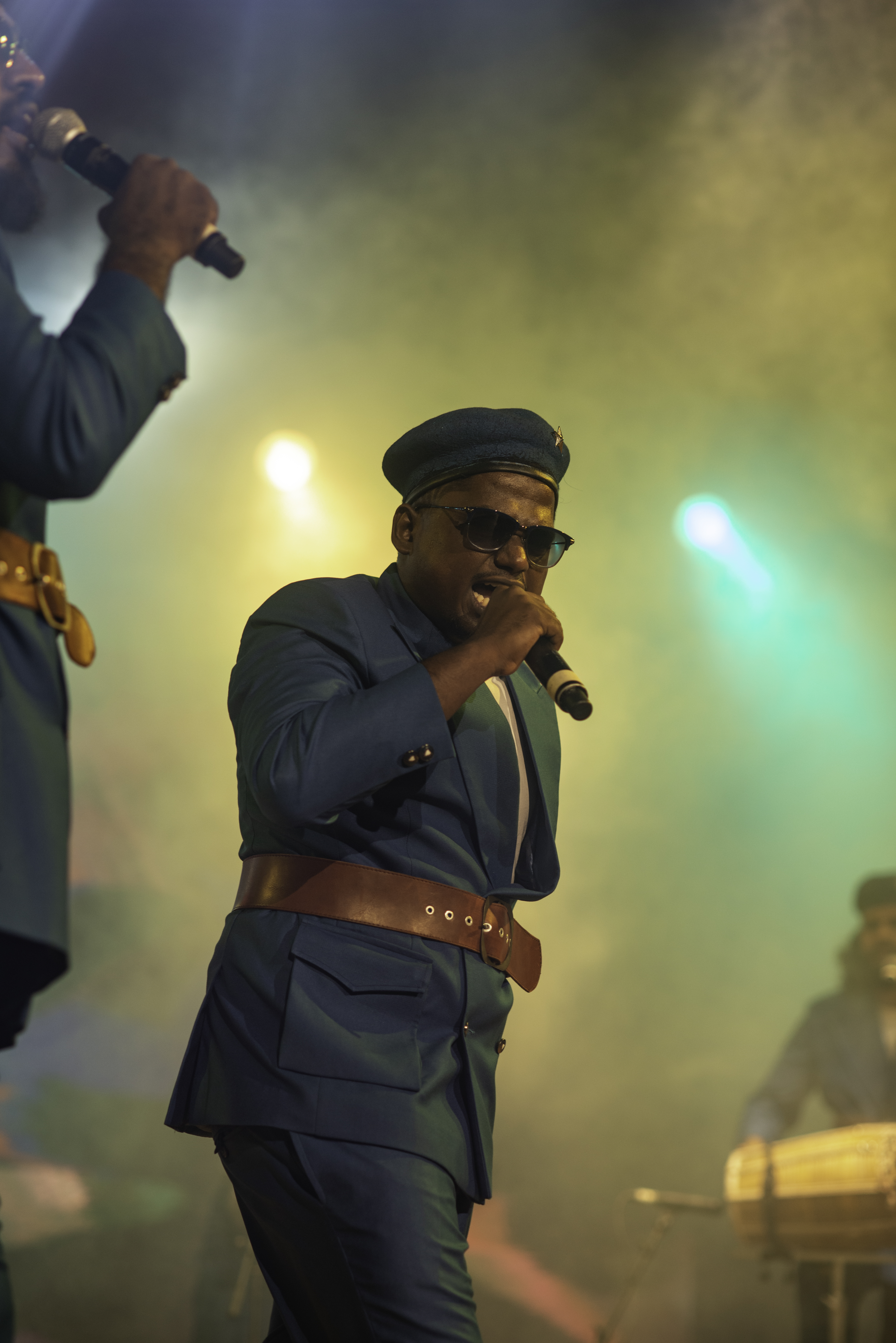
- Arivu performing with The Casteless Collective in Chennai

Background information
- Born: Arivarasu Kalainesan; India
- Genres: Hip hop; folk; gaana; oppari; pop
- Occupations: Rapper; singer; songwriter
- Years active: 2017–present

Arivarasu Kalainesan, more commonly known as Arivu, is an Indian rapper, singer, songwriter and composer. He is best known for his Tamil independent singles, including "Enjoy Enjaami", and for his work on film numbers like "Vaathi Raid" from Master (2021), "Single Pasanga" from Natpe Thunai (2019), "Neeye Oli" from Sarpatta Parambarai (2021), "Golden Sparrow" from Nilavuku En Mel Ennadi Kobam and "Thalapathy Kacheri" from Jana Nayagan (2026).

== Early life ==
Arivu was born in Arakkonam, a town in Tamil Nadu, India, into a family rooted in education and social service. His early exposure to Tamil folk music, Ambedkarite songs, and Arivoli Iyakkam (literacy awareness campaign) songs played a vital role in shaping his musical and ideological outlook. Starting from his teenage years, Arivu developed a deep understanding of socio-political issues, which became one of the central themes in his music. At the age of 18, Arivu released his debut poetry collection titled "Kuninthi Varaverkum Kudisaigal" which dealt with a range of topics spanning from love to socio-political issues.

== Career ==
=== Casteless Collective (2017–) ===
Arivu gained widespread recognition through his association with The Casteless Collective, a Chennai-based band that uses music to address caste oppression, inequality, and social reform. Formed by film director Pa. Ranjith in 2017, the collective consists of artists who challenge caste discrimination through a mix of Tamil folk traditions, rock, and rap.In 2017, Arivu auditioned and became a part of The Casteless Collective. Arivu rose to prominence as a songwriter and rapper through his work with the group, including "Jaibhim Anthem" and "Quota Song". Arivu's contributions to The Casteless Collective include songwriting and rapping, where he combines Tamil folklore with modern hip-hop beats to communicate powerful messages. As the prime songwriter for the band, Arivu gained recognition for his powerful lyricism and his ability to draw on multiple storytelling traditions to create a "potent fusion".

=== Therukural: Debut Album (2019) ===
In 2019, Arivu's debut album Therukural (Tamil: Voice of the Street) was released. Songs such as "Anti-Indian" and "Kalla Mouni" were written to highlight political issues in India and "speak truth to power". Therukural received positive reviews and was featured in Rolling Stone India as one of the top ten Indian albums in 2019. "Anti-Indian" was described as a "politically conscious hip-hop song" by Rolling Stone India. His music has won him praise "from commoners and musicians alike" and he has been described as top of the list of people who can to "use the power of music to move the public".

In August 2021, Rolling Stone India called Arivu "the voice of socio-political hip-hop, smashing records and defying social norms", and featured him in its digital cover.

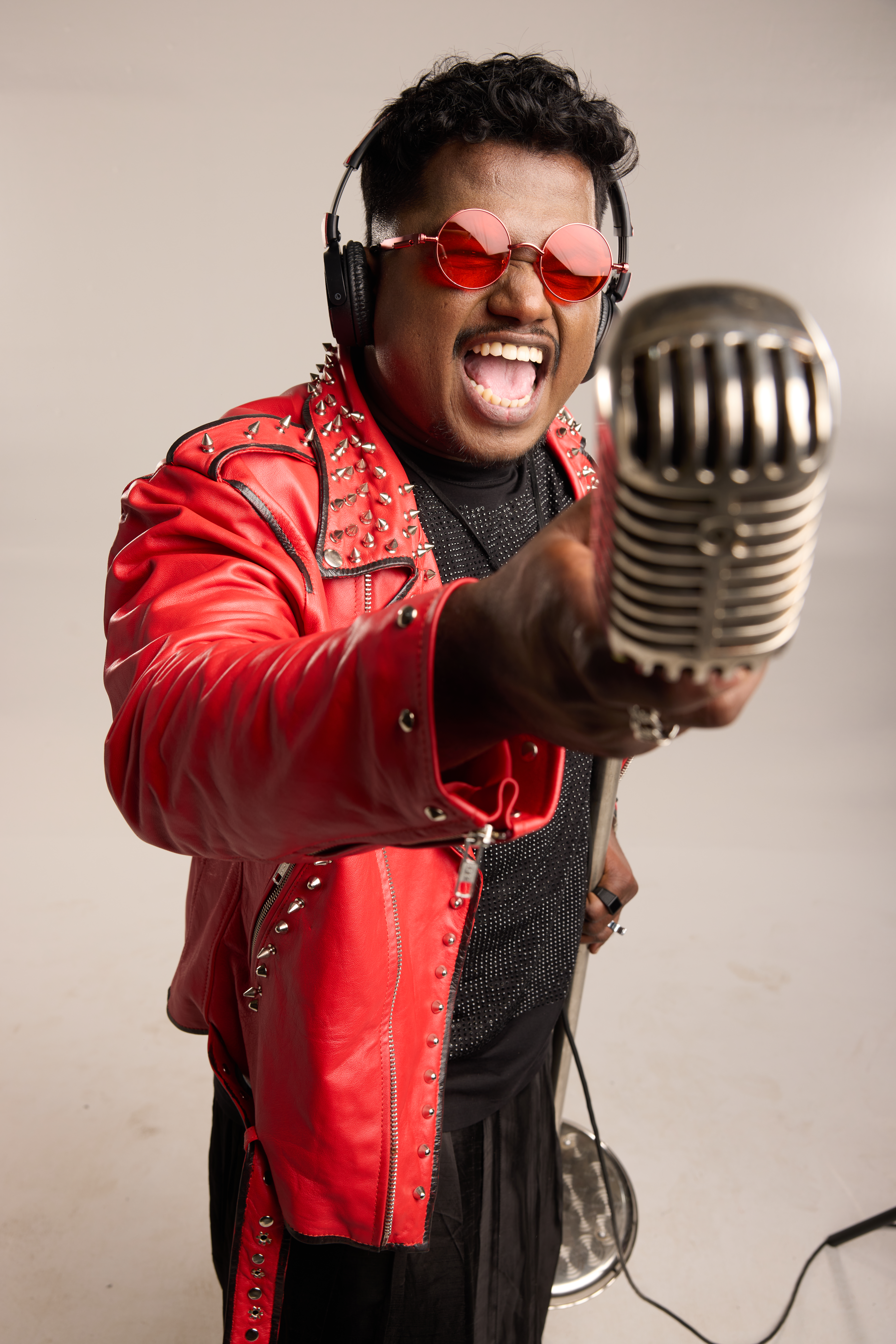
Arivu as Curator of Coke Studio Tamil Season 1

=== Breakthrough with Enjoy Enjaami (2021) ===
In 2021, Arivu achieved a career milestone with the release of Enjoy Enjaami, a Tamil single produced by the music label Maajja. Enjoy Enjaami broke the glass ceiling for Tamil independent music by garnering more than 500 million views in YouTube (as of November 2024). Collaborating with singer Dhee, Arivu wrote and performed verses that tell the story of Tamil landless laborers, colonial exploitation, and the community's connection with nature. The song's unique blend of traditional and contemporary elements, combined with Arivu's poignant verses, made it a viral hit on streaming platforms, with half a billion views globally. The success of Enjoy Enjaami brought Tamil independent music to the forefront and earned Arivu recognition as a dynamic new artist on the international stage. His contribution of fusing the traditional genre of Oppari with modern rap in his writing and delivery is seen as one of his authentic trademarks.

In Enjoy Enjaami, Arivu explores the complex history of his grandmother Valliyamma, an immigrant tea-plantation labourer from Sri Lanka. According to the lyricist, Arivu, the song was written as a celebration of his roots, harkening back to a time when humanity was a fledgling civilization, living in harmony with the turns of the earth and the many lives that shared it with them. Later, for the occasion of World Music Day, Enjoy Enjaami was remixed by DJ Snake for Spotify Singles.

=== Arivu and The Ambassa Band (2022–) ===
Arivu also leads the 10-piece band Ambassa, founded in 2022. The band draws on modern Western musical elements such as rapping and beatboxing, as well as traditional Indian music traditions such as oppari and gaana. Ambassa is a colloquial term in Tamil for 50 paisa.

=== Coke Studio Tamil Season 1: Curator ===
In 2023, Arivu is offered the opportunity to be the curator for the Coke Studio Tamil season 1 along with Sean Roland. He wrote and performed the single Sagavasi along with Khatija Rahman, which became the most listened-to song of the season with 23 million views on YouTube. Arivu's Ambassa band's debut song, Tamizh Vazhthu, was premiered on Coke Studio Tamil Season 2.

== Discography ==
- All works is in Tamil, unless specified otherwise.

=== Albums ===
- Therukural (2019)
- Valliamma Peraandi – Vol. 01 (2024)

=== Singles ===
| Year | Title | Composer | Songwriter | Peak chart positions | Ref. |
| Year | Title | Composer | Songwriter | UKAsian | Ref. |
|---|---|---|---|---|---|
| 2020 | "Monkeys with 5G" | Arivu | Arivu | | |
| 2021 | "Don't Touch Me" | Yuvan Shankar Raja | Arivu | —N/a | |
| 2021 | "Enjoy Enjaami" | Santhosh Narayanan, Arivu | Arivu | 5 | |
| 2022 | "Candy" | Yuvan Shankar Raja | Arivu | | |
| 2024 | "TVK Ideology Song" | Arivu | Arivu | —N/a | |

=== Films ===
| Year | Film | Song(s) | Composer | | | | |
|---|---|---|---|---|---|---|---|
| Year | Film | Song(s) | Composer | 2018 | Vada Chennai | "Maathiya Seraiyile" "Patta Patti" | Santhosh Narayanan |
| 2019 | Natpe Thunai | "Single Pasanga" "Veedhikor Jaadhi" | Hiphop Tamizha | | | | |
| 2019 | Irandam Ulagaporin Kadaisi Gundu | "Nilamellam" | Tenma | | | | |
| 2020 | Pattas | "Mavane" | Vivek-Mervin | | | | |
| 2020 | Dagaalty | "Dagaalty Naa!" | Vijay Narain | | | | |
| 2020 | Naadodigal 2 | "Varungaalam Engaladhu" | Justin Prabhakaran | | | | |
| 2020 | Gypsy | "Theevira Vyaadhi" | Santhosh Narayanan | | | | |
| 2020 | Tughlaq Durbar | "Annathe Sethi" | Govind Vasantha | | | | |
| 2020 | Master | "Vathi Raid" | Anirudh Ravichander | | | | |
| 2021 | Mandela | "Yela Yelo" | Bharath Sankar | | | | |
| 2021 | Jagame Thandhiram | "Theengu Thaakka" "Naan Dhaan Da Mass" | Santhosh Narayanan | | | | |
| 2021 | Sarpatta Parambarai | "Neeye Oli" "Neeye Oli" (Film Version) | Santhosh Narayanan | | | | |
| 2021 | Aranmanai 3 | "Ratatapata" | C. Sathya | | | | |
| 2021 | Jai Bhim | "Power" | Sean Roldan | | | | |
| 2021 | Jail | "Nagarodi" | G. V. Prakash Kumar | | | | |
| 2021 | Enemy | "Little India" | S. Thaman | | | | |
| 2021 | Annaatthe | "A for Annaatthe" | D. Imman | | | | |
| 2021 | Maanaadu | "Voice of Unity" | Yuvan Shankar Raja | | | | |
| 2022 | Valimai | "The Intense of Fire – Theme" | Yuvan Shankar Raja | | | | |
| 2022 | Maaran | "Polladha Ulagam" | G. V. Prakash Kumar | | | | |
| 2022 | Yaanai | "Bodhaiya Vittu Vaale" | G. V. Prakash Kumar | | | | |
| 2022 | Selfie | "Oorkaran" | G. V. Prakash Kumar | | | | |
| 2022 | Selfie | "Badass Bossman" | G. V. Prakash Kumar | | | | |
| 2022 | Selfie | "Padippu Thevaillai" | G. V. Prakash Kumar | | | | |
| 2022 | Selfie | "Yedakoodam" | G. V. Prakash Kumar | | | | |
| 2022 | Prince | "Who Am I?" | Thaman S | | | | |
| 2022 | Captain | "Akkrinai Naan" | D. Imman | | | | |
| 2022 | Sardar | "Inky Pinky Ponky" | G. V. Prakash Kumar | | | | |
| 2023 | Vaathi | "One Life" | GV Prakash Kumar | | | | |
| 2023 | Maamannan | "Manna Maamanna" | A. R. Rahman | | | | |
| 2023 | Jawan – Tamil dubbed | "Pattasa" | Anirudh Ravichander | | | | |
| 2023 | Jawan – Telugu dubbed | "Galatta" | Anirudh Ravichander | | | | |
| 2024 | Singappenney | "Ezhundhu Vaa" | Kumaran Sivamani | | | | |
| 2024 | Singappenney | "Kanne Yen Kaniyee" | Kumaran Sivamani | | | | |
| 2024 | Saloon | "Mayir Song" | Sam C. S. | | | | |
| 2024 | Singapore Saloon | "Vandha Mala" | Vivek-Mervin | | | | |
| 2024 | DeAr | "Sleeping Beauty" | G. V. Prakash Kumar | | | | |
| 2024 | Teenz | "Bibli Bibli Bili Bili" | D. Imman | | | | |
| 2024 | Raayan | "Raayan Rumble" - Tamil "Raayan Rumble" - Telugu "Raayan Rumble" - Hindi | A. R. Rahman | | | | |
| 2024 | Thangalaan | "War Song" | G. V. Prakash Kumar | | | | |
| 2024 | Thangalaan | "Thandora Pottanungo" | G. V. Prakash Kumar | | | | |
| 2024 | Nilavuku En Mel Ennadi Kobam | "Golden Sparrow" | G. V. Prakash Kumar | | | | |
| 2024 | Amaran | "Amara" "Por Veeran" (Azadi) | G. V. Prakash Kumar | | | | |
| 2025 | Sweetheart! | "Torture Pro Max" | Yuvan Shankar Raja | | | | |
| 2025 | Coolie | "Chikitu" | Anirudh Ravichander | | | | |
| 2025 | Coolie | "Powerhouse" | Anirudh Ravichander | | | | |
| 2025 | Idli Kadai | "Enjaami Thandhaane" "Kulasamy Kaaval Kaaka" | G. V. Prakash Kumar | | | | |
| 2025 | Thandakaaranyam | "Kaava Kaade" | Justin Prabhakaran | | | | |
| 2026 | Jana Nayagan | "Thalapathy Kacheri" | Anirudh Ravichander | | | | |
| 2026 | Thalaivar Thambi Thalaimaiyil | "TTT" | Vishnu Vijay | | | | |
| 2026 | Karuppu | "Verappa" & "Verappa Extended" | Sai Abhyankkar | | | | |
| 2026 | Blast | "Arakkan Thanae" | Ravi Basrur | | | | |
| 2026 | Scene | "Respectaa" | Sushin Shyam | | | | |

=== Television ===
| Year | TV series | Credited as | | Song(s) | Notes |
| Year | TV series | Lyricist | Singer | Song(s) | Notes |
|---|---|---|---|---|---|
| 2021 | The Family Man | ✗ | ✓ | "Maaveerarukku Maranamila" | Season 2; composed by Sachin–Jigar |
| 2024 | Bigg Boss Season 8 | ✓ | ✓ | "BB Anthem" | |

== Filmography ==
=== As lyricist ===
| Year | Film | Song(s) | Composer | | | | |
|---|---|---|---|---|---|---|---|
| Year | Film | Song(s) | Composer | 2018 | Kaala | "Urimayai Meetpom" | Santhosh Narayanan |
| Vada Chennai | "Maathiya Seraiyile" "Patta Patti" | | | 2018 | | | Santhosh Narayanan |
| 2019 | Vantha Rajavathaan Varuven | "Red Cardu" "Modern Muniyamma" | Hiphop Tamizha | | | | |
| 2019 | Natpe Thunai | "Single Pasanga" "Veedhikor Jaadhi" | Hiphop Tamizha | | | | |
| 2019 | Irandam Ulagaporin Kadaisi Gundu | "Thalaimurai" | Tenma | | | | |
| 2020 | Pattas | "Mavane" | Vivek-Mervin | | | | |
| 2020 | Dagaalty | "Dagaalty Naa!" | Vijay Narain | | | | |
| 2020 | Naadodigal 2 | "Varungaalam Engaladhu" | Justin Prabhakaran | | | | |
| 2020 | Naan Sirithal | "Happy Birthday" | Hiphop Tamizha | | | | |
| 2020 | College Kumar | "College Kumar" "Baari Baari" | Qutub-E-Kripa | | | | |
| 2020 | Gypsy | "Theevira Vyaadhi" | Santhosh Narayanan | | | | |
| 2020 | Soorarai Pottru | "Maara Theme" | G. V. Prakash Kumar | | | | |
| 2020 | Master | "Vathi Raid" | Anirudh Ravichander | | | | |
| 2021 | Mandela | "Yela Yelo" | Bharath Sankar | | | | |
| 2021 | Jagame Thandhiram | "Theengu Thaakka" "Naan Dhaan Da Mass" | Santhosh Narayanan | | | | |
| 2021 | Sarpatta Parambarai | "Neeye Oli" "Neeye Oli" (Film Version) | Santhosh Narayanan | | | | |
| 2021 | Aranmanai 3 | "Ratatapata" | C. Sathya | | | | |
| 2021 | Jai Bhim | "Power" | Sean Roldan | | | | |
| 2021 | Jail | "Pathu Kaasu" | G. V. Prakash Kumar | | | | |
| 2021 | Jail | "Nagarodi" | G. V. Prakash Kumar | | | | |
| 2021 | Enemy | "Pathala" | S. Thaman | | | | |
| 2021 | Enemy | "Little India" | S. Thaman | | | | |
| 2021 | Enemy | "Orey Naan Orey Nee" | Sam C. S. | | | | |
| 2021 | Annaatthe | "A for Annaatthe" | D. Imman | | | | |
| 2021 | Maanaadu | "Voice of Unity" | Yuvan Shankar Raja | | | | |
| 2021 | Enna Solla Pogirai | "Cute Ponnu" | Vivek-Mervin | | | | |
| 2022 | Valimai | "The Intense of Fire – Theme" | Yuvan Shankar Raja | | | | |
| 2022 | Yaanai | "Bodhaiya Vittu Vaale" | G. V. Prakash Kumar | | | | |
| 2022 | Selfie | "Oorkaran" | G. V. Prakash Kumar | | | | |
| 2022 | Selfie | "Imaikkariye" | G. V. Prakash Kumar | | | | |
| 2022 | Selfie | "Badass Bossman" | G. V. Prakash Kumar | | | | |
| 2022 | Selfie | "Padippu Thevaillai" | G. V. Prakash Kumar | | | | |
| 2022 | Selfie | "Yedakoodam" | G. V. Prakash Kumar | | | | |
| 2022 | Prince | "Who Am I?" | Thaman S | | | | |
| 2022 | Prince | "Jessica" | Thaman S | | | | |
| 2022 | Captain | "Akkrinai Naan" | D. Imman | | | | |
| 2022 | Sardar | "Inky Pinky Ponky" | G. V. Prakash Kumar | | | | |
| 2023 | Vaathi | "One Life" | GV Prakash Kumar | | | | |
| 2023 | Maamannan | "Manna Maamanna" | A. R. Rahman | | | | |
| 2023 | Jawan – Tamil dubbed | "Pattasa" | Anirudh Ravichander | | | | |
| 2023 | Jawan – Telugu dubbed | "Galatta" | Anirudh Ravichander | | | | |
| 2024 | Singappenney | "Kanne Yen Kaniyee" | Kumaran Sivamani | | | | |
| 2024 | Vadakkupatti Ramasamy | "Paravuthu" | Sean Roldan | | | | |
| 2024 | Saloon | "Mayir Song" | Sam C. S. | | | | |
| 2024 | Singapore Saloon | "Vandha Mala" | Vivek-Mervin | | | | |
| 2024 | DeAr | "Sleeping Beauty" | G. V. Prakash Kumar | | | | |
| 2024 | Indian 2 | "Come Back Indian" | Anirudh Ravichander | | | | |
| 2024 | Teenz | "Bibli Bibli Bili Bili" | D. Imman | | | | |
| 2024 | Raayan | "Raayan Rumble" | A. R. Rahman | | | | |
| 2024 | Thangalaan | "War Song" | G. V. Prakash Kumar | | | | |
| 2024 | Thangalaan | "Oppari Song" | G. V. Prakash Kumar | | | | |
| 2024 | Vettaiyan | "Hunter Vantaar" | Anirudh Ravichander | | | | |
| 2024 | Nilavuku En Mel Ennadi Kobam | "Golden Sparrow" | G. V. Prakash Kumar | | | | |
| 2024 | Amaran | "Amara" "Por Veeran" (Azadi) | G. V. Prakash Kumar | | | | |
| 2025 | Sweetheart! | "Kadhal Adhu Poi" | Yuvan Shankar Raja | | | | |
| 2025 | Sweetheart! | "Torture Pro Max" | Yuvan Shankar Raja | | | | |
| 2025 | Coolie | "Chikitu" | Anirudh Ravichander | | | | |
| 2025 | Coolie | "Powerhouse" | Anirudh Ravichander | | | | |
| 2025 | Idli Kadai | "Kulasamy Kaaval Kaaka" | G. V. Prakash Kumar | | | | |
| 2025 | Thandakaaranyam | "Kaava Kaade" | Justin Prabhakaran | | | | |
| 2026 | Jana Nayagan | "Thalapathy Kacheri" | Anirudh Ravichander | | | | |
| 2026 | Parasakthi | "Namakkana Kaalam" | G. V. Prakash Kumar | | | | |
| 2026 | Blast | "Arakkan Thanae" | Ravi Basrur | | | | |

== Awards ==
| Year | Award | Category | Work | Ref. |
|---|---|---|---|---|
| 2022 | Filmfare Awards South | Best Lyricist – Tamil | "Neeye Oli" | |
| 2022 | Edison Awards 2022 | Best Tamil Rapper of the Year | —N/a | |
| 2022 | News18 Magudam Awards 2022 | Arts and Culture | —N/a | |
| 2023 | Vikatan Nambikkai Awards | Top Ten Youth | —N/a | |
