= Retro (soundtrack) =

2025 film soundtrack by Santhosh Narayanan

- Soundtrack album cover

Soundtrack album by Santhosh Narayanan
- Released: 18 April 2025
- Recorded: June–November 2024
- Studios: Future Tense Studio, Chennai; The Bridge Studio, New York; UNO Records, Chennai
- Genre: Feature film soundtrack
- Length: 21:54 (A-side); 15:10 (B-side)
- Language: Tamil
- Label: T-Series
- Producer: Santhosh Narayanan

Santhosh Narayanan chronology
Sikandar (2025)	Retro (2025)	Thalaivan Thalaivii (2025)
External audio
- Retro Full Audio Jukebox on YouTube
- Retro Side B Full Audio Jukebox on YouTube

Singles from Retro
- 1. "Kannadi Poove" Released: 13 February 2025; 2. "Kanimaa" Released: 21 March 2025; 3. "The One" Released: 12 April 2025

Retro is the soundtrack album composed by Santhosh Narayanan for the 2025 Indian Tamil-language film of the same name, Directed by Karthik Subbaraj, the film stars Suriya and Pooja Hegde. The album, featuring eleven tracks with lyrics written by Vivek, Arunraja Kamaraj, Shan Vincent de Paul and 808Krshna. Kasarla Shyam and Raqueeb Alam wrote lyrics for the dubbed versions in Telugu and Hindi languages respectively.

The album was split into A-side and B-side, A-side soundtrack consisting of 6 tracks was released on 18 April 2025 and B-side soundtrack consisting of 5 tracks was released on 23 May 2025 by T-Series. A promotional event was held on the same day in Jawaharlal Nehru Stadium in Chennai to launch the album. The music received positive reception from critics and audience. The tracks "Kanimaa", "Kannadi Poove" and "The One" topped the national charts, in all music and video platforms.

== Development ==
The music and background score are composed by Santhosh Narayanan, in his first collaboration with Suriya and eighth with Subbaraj. (Note: Santhosh Narayanan and Karthik Subbaraj previously collaborated on Pizza (2012), Jigarthanda (2014), Iraivi (2016), Mercury (2018), Jagame Thandhiram (2021), Mahaan (2022) and Jigarthanda DoubleX (2023).) His involvement was confirmed by the producers on his birthday (15 May 2024). Shortly afterwards, he started working on the film's music by June 2024. The first piece, he composed was the theme for the promotional video—"the first shot", which was tuned within two hours, when Santhosh worked on the background score of Kalki 2898 AD (2024).

As Subbaraj stated the film being set in the romantic action genre, he provided a reference of Alai Payuthey (2000) for the musical soundscape and the vibe being a "perfect blend of action and love". Santhosh began working on the film's background score by November 2024. Santhosh, through his X account, had claimed that he used DeepSeek for producing the background scores for the film, which helped him to reduce the duration of stem export. In a conversation with sound engineer Vijay Rathinam, Santhosh described the process was more of basic project cleaning based on empty tracks, tracks with all muted regions being moved to a folder and then exported based on custom preferences, and the reasoning language model was way better in DeepSeek than in ChatGPT.

== Album information ==
The songs featured lyrics written by Arunraja Kamaraj, Vivek, Shan Vincent de Paul and 808krsna (Note: pseudonym for Thejas Krishna) and vocals performed by Punya Selva, Sid Sriram, 808krsna, SVDP, Suriya and Santhosh. "Kannadi Poove" is a melancholic dance number sung by Santhosh and backing vocals provided by Kapil Kapilan himself. It was composed in the traditional pallavi and charanam structure. The song emphasizes the use of violin in the opening and in interlude for a melancholic feel, as the song is picturized on Suriya's character describing his love for Hegde during his incarceration. After release, Santhosh described the song as close to his heart.

"Kanimaa" which released as a second single is developed from casual conversations between Subbaraj, Santhosh and Vivek. Its composition was influenced by the rhythm of 1990s wedding folk songs in Tamil, with the original structure of introductory line, hook line and chorus, and emphasized use of drums and trumpet for instrumentation and melody. The composition of "Kanimaa" was influenced from T. Rajendar's "En Aasai Mythiliye" from Mythili Ennai Kaathali (1986). The song was sung by Santhosh himself, with vocals from The Indian Choral Ensemble—Aparna Harikumar, Nidhi Saraogi, Sushmita Narasimhan, Sreekanth Hariharan, Shridhar Ramesh, and Karthik Manickavasakam. The third single "The One" is a high energy, upbeat number, which featured vocals by Sid Sriram and Santhosh, with rap portions by SVDP, backing vocals by Mahalakshmi Santhosh and Victor, as well as chorus performed by The Indian Choral Ensemble.

The song "Love Detox", an upbeat dance number is recorded by Punya Selva, with Suriya also singing a few lines along with Santhosh. "Edharkaga Marubadi" is a melancholic number, also sung by Selva, and "Lose Your Fkin Mind" is a mid-tempo song written and performed by 808krsna. At the film's audio launch, Santhosh asserted that the film featured 12 songs. His mother Mahalakshmi had also recorded a song for the film.

== Music video ==
Sheriff choreographed the songs, having did the same for all of Subbaraj's previous films. The song "Love Detox" is a dance number featuring Shriya Saran, which was filmed at the second schedule in Ooty. The song "Kannadi Poove" was shot at the final phase of the filming schedule, before schedule wrap. A jail set was constructed at the BSNL office in Chennai for shooting the song. The song "Kanimaa" is part of a 15-minute long single-shot sequence in the film, involving action, drama and dance. Besides the lead cast and the supporting actors, Santhosh also appeared in a cameo in this song. All the actors had shot the scene in a single take.

The rest of the songs will be featured as montages, throughout the film. However, a promotional music video for "The One" was shot with the singers; the video was directed by Ken Royson, filmed by Shreyaas Krishna and choreographed by Suren of The Dancers Club.

== Singles ==
The soundtrack was preceded with three singles. The first single "Kannadi Poove" was released on 13 February 2025, on the eve of Valentine's Day. It was followed by the second single "Kanimaa" was released on 21 March, and the third single "The One" on 12 April.

== Release ==
The audio rights of the film were acquired by T-Series. A-side of Retro's soundtrack, consisting of six songs, was released on 18 April 2025 through digital platforms. Its physical release, coincided with an audio launch event held at the Jawaharlal Nehru Stadium in Chennai. The event saw the attendance of Suriya, Pooja Hegde, Karthik Subbaraj, Santhosh Narayanan and other film's cast and crew among other celebrities. Santhosh Narayanan and his musical team performed the songs live at the event. B-side of Retro's soundtrack, consisting of five songs, was released on 23 May 2025. The soundtrack was also released in Telugu, Hindi, Kannada and Malayalam languages.

== Track listing ==
=== Tamil ===
A-side
No.	Title	Lyrics	Singer(s)	Length
1.	"Love Detox"	Arunraja Kamaraj	Punya Selva, Suriya, Santhosh Narayanan	3:30
2.	"Edharkaga Marubadi"	Vivek	Punya Selva, Santhosh Narayanan	4:17
3.	"The One"	Vivek	Sid Sriram, Shan Vincent de Paul, Santhosh Narayanan	4:00
4.	"Kannadi Poove"	Vivek	Santhosh Narayanan	4:21
5.	"Lose Your Fkin Mind"	808Krshnaa	808Krshnaa	1:42
6.	"Kanimaa"	Vivek	Santhosh Narayanan, The Indian Choral Ensemble	4:04
Total length:				21:54

B-side
No.	Title	Lyrics	Singer(s)	Length
1.	"Edharkaga Marubadi (Male Version)"	Vivek	Ananthu, The Indian Choral Ensemble	4:17
2.	"Maar Ka Kahla"	Raqueeb Alam	Raqueeb Alam	2:26
3.	"Punnagaiye"	Vivek	Santhosh Narayanan	3:27
4.	"Rocket"	Arjun Sasi	Arjun Sasi	2:08
5.	"The Cult"	Instrumental	Santhosh Narayanan	3:02
Total length:				15:10

=== Telugu ===
No.	Title	Lyrics	Singer(s)	Length
1.	"Love Detox"	Kasarla Shyam	Punya Selva, Aditya Ravindran	3:30
2.	"Kanu Paapa"	Kasarla Shyam	Punya Selva	4:17
3.	"The One"	Kasarla Shyam	Sarthak Kalyani, Shan Vincent de Paul, The Indian Choral Ensemble	4:00
4.	"Kannullona"	Kasarla Shyam	Kapil Kapilan	4:21
5.	"Lose Your Fkin Mind"	808Krshnaa	808Krshnaa	1:42
6.	"Bujjamma"	Kasarla Shyam	Santhosh Narayanan, The Indian Choral Ensemble	4:04
Total length:				21:54

=== Hindi ===
No.	Title	Lyrics	Singer(s)	Length
1.	"Love Detox"	Raqueeb Alam	Punya Selva, Aditya Ravindran	3:30
2.	"Kyun Phir Se"	Raqueeb Alam	Punya Selva	4:17
3.	"The One"	Raqueeb Alam	Sarthak Kalyani, Shan Vincent de Paul, The Indian Choral Ensemble	4:00
4.	"Gull Ainaa"	Raqueeb Alam	Hriday Gattani	4:21
5.	"Lose Your Fkin Mind"	808Krshnaa	808Krshnaa	1:42
6.	"Anarkali"	Raqueeb Alam	Santhosh Narayanan, The Indian Choral Ensemble	4:04
Total length:				21:54

=== Kannada ===
No.	Title	Lyrics	Singer(s)	Length
1.	"Love Detox"	Swathi Shankari	Devu Mathew, Shibin Srinivas	3:30
2.	"Etake"	Swathi Shankari	Devu Mathew	4:17
3.	"The One"	Swathi Shankari	Sarthak Kalyani, Shan Vincent de Paul, The Indian Choral Ensemble	4:00
4.	"Kannalliye"	Swathi Shankari	Sarath Santosh	4:21
5.	"Lose Your Fkin Mind"	808Krshna	Santhosh Narayanan, 808Krshna	1:42
6.	"Aase Pattayittu"	Swathi Shankari	Devu Mathew, P N Gireesh	4:04
Total length:				21:54

=== Malayalam ===
No.	Title	Lyrics	Singer(s)	Length
1.	"Love Detox"	Shibu Kallar	Devu Mathew, Shibin Srinivas	3:30
2.	"Ethirkanga"	Shibu Kallar	Devu Mathew	4:17
3.	"The One"	Shibu Kallar	Sarthak Kalyani, Shan Vincent de Paul, The Indian Choral Ensemble	4:00
4.	"Kannalyee"	Shibu Kallar	Sarath Santosh	4:21
5.	"Lose Your Fkin Mind"	808Krshna	Santhosh Narayanan, 808Krshna	1:42
6.	"Kattumalli"	Shibu Kallar	P N Gireesh, Devu Mathew	4:04
Total length:				21:54

== Background score ==
Retro OST

Film score by Santhosh Narayanan
- Released: 25 July 2025
- Genre: Film score
- Length: 49:28
- Language: Tamil
- Label: T-Series
- Producer: Santhosh Narayanan
External audio
- Retro OST ((Original Sound Track)) on YouTube

The film's background score was composed by Santhosh Narayanan and was released as a separate album titled Retro OST on 25 July 2025 by T-Series. The album contains twenty-nine instrumental tracks with a total running time of approximately 49 minutes. The album features cues associated with the film's characters, relationships, action sequences and major narrative developments.

No.	Title	Length
1.	"Thilagan"	1:33
2.	"Pari Found"	0:45
3.	"Karate Kid"	1:28
4.	"The Plan"	1:22
5.	"Lose Your Fkin Mind"	1:40
6.	"Gold Fish"	1:32
7.	"Happy Married Life"	1:11
8.	"Rukku - Pari"	1:25
9.	"Rukkku's Love"	0:24
10.	"Cook The Duck"	1:37
11.	"The Cult"	3:02
12.	"A Smile"	2:19
13.	"Cult Ur Free"	1:16
14.	"Exposed"	2:04
15.	"Creep"	0:47
16.	"Betrayed"	1:49
17.	"Leaving Him"	1:50
18.	"Fight Starts"	1:15
19.	"Grace Time"	2:11
20.	"Evil Plan"	1:13
21.	"Story Of Legends"	1:58
22.	"Jungle Warfare"	1:43
23.	"Kappal Sandai"	1:26
24.	"Local Legend"	1:51
25.	"Ancestors"	4:01
26.	"Legend Rises"	1:26
27.	"Reunion"	2:00
28.	"Rise Of A Hero"	0:47
29.	"The End"	3:21
Total length:		49:28

== Reception ==
Reviewing the film, Goutham S of Pinkvilla wrote "[…] Santhosh Narayanan delivers an outstanding score. While the music tracks were already popular, it's the background score that truly breathes life into the film, enhancing every scene." M. Suganth of The Times of India wrote " Then, there's Santhosh Narayanan, who delivers foot-tapping numbers and a rousing background score that elevates even the weaker moments." Latha Srinivasan of Hindustan Times wrote " Speaking about the music, Santosh Narayan has delivered a thumping BGM that elevates the film, especially the action scenes. The song Kannima is already a major ear worm and whistle-inducing in theatres." Avinash Ramachandran of The Indian Express wrote " What cinematographer Shreyaas Krishna, composer Santhosh Narayanan, and editor Shafique Mohammed Ali have achieved in Retro is nothing short of brilliant. […] The background scores for a lot of the characters, and the innumerable fight sequences, is Santhosh having a lot of fun."

Upon the release of the first single "Kannadi Poove", the song was well received, praising its music and lyrics. A critic of The Times of India said, "With its soothing orchestration, breezy rhythms, and heartfelt lyrics, the track exudes an old-school charm while retaining a contemporary touch. The vocals, layered with tenderness, enhance the dreamy feel of the song, making it an instant earworm. Santhosh Narayanan’s signature experimental elements subtly infuse the composition, adding depth without overshadowing its emotional core. Overall, 'Kannadi Poove' is a mesmerising love ballad that promises to resonate deeply with listeners, capturing the essence of romance and longing."

The song "Kanimaa" was praised by Srijony Das of Pinkvilla, who also called it a "foot-tapping number". Atreyee Poddar of Indulge Express described the song as a "vibe material". The Statesman praised the song and stated, "The track has that perfect mix of upbeat rhythm and catchy choreography, making it the next big sensation for reels and dance covers." Rahul M of The Free Press Journal complimented the idea of the song and wrote "The song's visuals feature a traditional Tamil wedding with people dancing joyously in celebration. It shows people dressed in vibrant costumes and displaying celebratory vibes." Upon reviewing the song "The One", Goutham S of Pinkvilla, noted "The song composed by Santhosh Narayanan packs in quite the energy in terms of bringing out a banger that everyone is likely to be excited for".

== Chart performance ==
Chart	Song	Peak position	Ref.
India (Billboard)	"Kanimaa"	17	
India (Billboard)	"Kannadi Poove"	22	
India (Billboard)	"The One"	21	
UK Asian Music Chart (OCC)	"Kanimaa"	23	
UK Asian Music Chart (OCC)	"Kannadi Poove"	33	
UK Asian Music Chart (OCC)	"The One"	39	
