= Kanimaa =

- Official single cover

Single by Santhosh Narayanan

from the album Retro
- Language: Tamil
- Released: 21 March 2025
- Recorded: 2024–2025
- Studio: Future Tense Studios, Chennai; UNO Records, Chennai
- Length: 4:04
- Label: T-Series
- Composer: Santhosh Narayanan
- Lyricist: Vivek
- Producer: Santhosh Narayanan

Retro track listing
- 1. "Love Detox"; 2. "Edharkaga Marubadi"; 3. "The One"; 4. "Kannadi Poove"; 5. "Lose Your Fkin' Mind"; 6. "Kanimaa"

"Kanimaa" (Tamil pronunciation: [kanimaː]; transl. Sweetheart) is an Indian Tamil-language song composed by Santhosh Narayanan for the soundtrack album of Tamil-language film Retro (2025). The song was sung by Santhosh Narayanan along with The Indian Choral Ensemble and was written by Vivek. After the success of the film's first single "Kannadi Poove", the expectations for the second was also highly increased.

The song was released as the second single on 21 March 2025 through the record label T-Series. The song's lyrical version was released on the YouTube on the same day. The song was also released in Telugu as "Bujjamma", with lyrics written by Kasarla Shyam, in Hindi as "Anarkali" with lyrics written by Raqueeb Alam, in Kannada as "Aase Pattayittu" with lyrics by Swathi Shankari and in Malayalam as "Kattumalli" with lyrics by Shibu Kallar. The song is part of a 15-minute long single-shot sequence in the film, featuring action, drama, and dance featuring the lead cast. Music composer Santhosh Narayanan made a cameo appearance in the song. Upon its release, the song received positive response and started trending on internet. The hook step dance involving Suriya and Pooja Hegde – the lead actors of Retro – became popular. Hegde's dance steps were widely appreciated, with Bollywood Hungama calling her "Queen of Hookstep".

Following its release, it peaked on the several charts including Billboard India Songs and UK Asian Music Chart and had a significant commercial success.

== Background and recording ==
Santhosh Narayanan composed the song for the Retro album. This marked his first collaboration with Suriya and eighth with Karthik Subbaraj, director of the film. (Note: Santhosh Narayanan and Karthik Subbaraj previously collaborated on Pizza (2012), Jigarthanda (2014), Iraivi (2016), Mercury (2018), Jagame Thandhiram (2021), Mahaan (2022) and Jigarthanda DoubleX (2023).) Lyricist Vivek wrote the lyrics for the song. There were no fixed lyrics or music while shooting the music video. Later, Santhosh adjusted the music to match the dance movements and changed the lyrics accordingly.

The song was recorded by Santhosh Narayanan at Future Tense Studios, Chennai. The song had the chorus by The Indian Choral Ensemble (Chamber), Aparna Harikumar, Nidhi Saraogi, Sushmita Narasimhan, Sreekanth Hariharan, Shridhar Ramesh, and Karthik Manickavasakam.

== Composition and lyrics ==
The song was conceptualized through casual conversations between Subbaraj, Santhosh, and Vivek. It features a 1990s-style "kalyana kuthu" (wedding folk) rhythm, aiming to evoke nostalgia for traditional wedding songs. Original structure of composition was: intro – hook line – chorus. Santhosh used drums for the instrumentation and added in trumpets for the melody. The song featured high-energy, dance-oriented beat. Santhosh broke down the song for listeners and other artists. The song had influences from traditional Tamil wedding music.

The Tamil word Kanimaa (கனிமா; Kaṉimā) variously translates to 'sweetheart', 'divinity', and 'sacredness'. Notable lines like "Gumma, Yemma, Summa, Kanimaa" serve as vocalizations to enhance the song's catchy hook.

== Marketing and release ==
The second was highly anticipated after the success of the film's first single "Kannadi Poove". The song release was announced by Karthik Subbaraj on 19 March 2025, on the occasion of his birthday, as a surprise gift for the fans. The song's teaser was unveiled on 20 March by the makers. Before the release of the song, Santhosh shared a funny dance version of the song on X, further increasing the song's anticipation. Instantly it received wider recognition with fans and celebrities appreciating his fun dance. The second single titled "Kanimaa" was released on 21 March 2025.

== Music video ==
The music video features Paarivel Kannan (Suriya) and Rukmini (Pooja Hegde) dancing to the song on their wedding. It also featured Joju George, Singampuli, and others. Besides the lead cast and the supporting actors, Santhosh also appeared in a cameo in this song.

=== Background and production ===
The song is part of a 15-minute long single-shot sequence in the film, featuring action, drama, and dance featuring the lead cast. According to Sherif, this is the first time mixing action, drama, and dance within 15 minutes in a film. The music video featured Suriya with a serious, expressionless face, while Pooja Hegde had a joyful expression, reflecting their respective characters in the film. The film team shot another version of the song with both Suriya and Hegde displaying joyful expressions and released it as a rehearsal video. Later, the makers confirmed that the video was not part of the film and was shot and released solely for fans.

Some common steps that are seen in every film of director Karthik Subbaraj are also seen in this song. Sherif Master was asked to prepare a hook step that would go viral on social media.

== Reception ==
Srijony Das of Pinkvilla praised the song and called it a "foot-tapping number". Atreyee Poddar of Indulge Express described it as a "vibe material". The Statesman praised the song and stated, "The track has that perfect mix of upbeat rhythm and catchy choreography, making it the next big sensation for reels and dance covers." Deccan Chronicle wrote "The song features groovy beats, electrifying music and Pooja Hegde's addictive hookstep".

Raisa Nasreen of Times Now wrote "Composed by Santhosh Narayanan, who has also sung the song with The Indian Choral Ensemble, Kanimaa is set in a wedding backdrop, bringing to life the dance beats 90s weddings. Vivek has written the lyrics for this Kalyaana Kuthu number." Rahul M of The Free Press Journal complimented the idea of the song and wrote "The song’s visuals feature a traditional Tamil wedding with people dancing joyously in celebration. It shows people dressed in vibrant costumes and displaying celebratory vibes."

== Other versions ==
The song was also released in Telugu as "Bujjamma", with lyrics written by Kasarla Shyam and vocals by Santhosh Narayanan and The Indian Choral Ensemble; in Hindi as "Anarkali", with lyrics written by Raqueeb Alam and vocals by Santhosh Narayanan and The Indian Choral Ensemble; in Kannada as "Aase Pattayittu", with lyrics written by Swathi Shankari and vocals by P N Gireesh and Devu Mathew; and in Malayalam as "Kattumalli", with lyrics written by Shibu Kallar and vocals by P N Gireesh and Devu Mathew.

== Commercial performance ==
Upon the release, song received widespread acclaim from the audience. The song peaked on the several charts including Billboard India Songs and UK Asian Music Chart and had a significant commercial success.

== Impact ==
Suriya and Pooja Hegde's signature step in the music video went viral and became a pop cultural phenomenon. There were many short videos created on social media, performing to the music and recreating dance sequences. Hegde often recreated the viral portion of the dance in the film's promotions. She performed the hookstep live with over 10,000 fans at the film's audio launch held on 18 April 2025 at Jawaharlal Nehru Stadium in Chennai.

The song crossed 10 million views within few hours of its release and 20 million within few days. Upon its release, the song started trending on internet. The song received positive reception from audiences, praising the music, vocal and choreography. The song soon started trending on several music platforms. The song increased the expectations of the audience and increased number of reservations made in advance that Retro lodged.

Hegde's Sari hook step went viral in social media, and many recreated the signature step. Hegde's expression was also praised by many calling her "expression queen" following the song's release with her dance moves drawing comparisons to her previous chartbusters like "Butta Bomma", "Arabic Kuthu" and "Ramuloo Ramulaa". A critic from The Times of India noted the song "garnered attention for its catchy tune and Pooja Hegde's mesmerizing dance performance, which quickly became a viral sensation on Instagram Reels." In an event Hegde stated, "I am filled with joy upon seeing all the love and appreciation coming in for Kanimaa song and the hookstep. My social media is filled with people recreating the hookstep and enjoying the vibe of the track. Seeing everyone grooving to the song, there’s no bigger validation as a performer."

Many celebrities such as Karthi, Sai Dhanshika, Raveena Daha, Swasika, Priya Prakash Varrier, Devika Nambiar, Ashika Ranganath, Samyuktha Shanmuganathan, Akshaya Kimmy, Dhakshana, Venba, Divya Vikram, Ramya Ranganathan, Saanve Megghana, Terry Crews and several others, recreated the music video by performing the song's iconic hook step.

== Credits and personnel ==
Credits adapted from YouTube.

- Santhosh Narayanan – composer, singer, arranger, programmer
- Vivek – lyricist
- The Indian Choral Ensemble – vocal
- Sherif – Choreographer
- Rupendar Venkatesh – mix engineer, mastering engineer
- Naveen Napier – bass
- Karthikvamsi – rhythm programmer
- Vijay – trumpet
- Maxi – trumpet
- Ben – trumpet
- Mariyappan – drum
- Buddhar kalaikuzhu – tapes

== Charts ==
Chart performances for "Kanimaa"
| Chart (2025) | Peak position |
|---|---|
| India (Billboard) | 17 |
| UK Asian Music Chart (OCC) | 23 |

== Awards and nominations ==
| Award | Date of ceremony | Category | Recipient(s) | Result | Ref. |
|---|---|---|---|---|---|
| Edison Awards | 24 May 2026 | Best Playback Singer Male | Santhosh Narayanan | Nominated | |
| Edison Awards | 24 May 2026 | Best Lyricist | Vivek | Won | |
| Edison Awards | 24 May 2026 | Best Dance Choreographer | Sherif | Nominated | |
| South Indian International Movie Awards | 12–13 September 2026 | Best Lyric writer - Tamil | Vivek | Pending | |
| South Indian International Movie Awards | 12–13 September 2026 | Best Playback Singer (male) - Tamil | Santhosh Narayanan | Pending | |
