= Sethum Aayiram Pon =

2019 Tamil film

- Release poster
- Directed by: Anand Ravichandran
- Written by: Anand Ravichandran
- Produced by: Anshulika Dubey; Priyanka Agarwal; Shashwat Singh
- Starring: Nivedhithaa Sathish; Srilekha Rajendran; Avinash Raghudevan; Gabrella Sellus
- Cinematography: Manikantan Krishnamachary
- Edited by: Prakash Karunanithi
- Music by: Shamanth Nag
- Production company: Wishberry Films
- Release dates: 8 May 2019 (New York Indian Film Festival); 1 April 2020 (Worldwide)
- Running time: 102 minutes
- Country: India
- Language: Tamil

Sethum Ayiram Pon: Roots (transl. Even Dead, Worth A Thousand Gold Pieces) is a 2019 Indian Tamil-language drama film directed by Anand Ravichandran in his directorial debut. The film stars Srilekha Rajendran, Nivedhithaa Sathish, and Avinash Raghudevan in the lead roles. The film was released directly through online streaming services after showing in select film festivals.

== Plot ==
The film follows the story of Krishnaveni (Srilekha Rajendran), an oppari singer, and her 23-year-old granddaughter, Meera (Nivedhithaa Sathish), who is a make-up artiste, after a period of separation. It explores the relationship between Meera and her grandmother after years of separation, the resolution of their conflict and how Meera finds her roots within rural life and its traditions.

== Cast ==
- Nivedhithaa Sathish as Meera (Kunjamma), an upcoming make-up artiste
- Srilekha Rajendran as Krishnaveni, Meera's grandmother
- Avinash Raghudevan as Kuberan, a make-up artiste for dead bodies
- Gabriella Sellus as Amudha, Meera's friend
- Mosakutty Rajendran as Bahubali
- Rathaakrishnan as Sangudevan
- Vichitran as Muthupandi
- Aishwarya as Rani
- Kousalya Devi as Usidha
- Dharma as Pechiyamma
- Vasantha Devi as Angamma
- Akash as Chembiyan
- Sanjay as Marudhu
- Kalimangalam Muniyammal as Muniyammal
- Pandiyamma as Pandiyamma

== Production ==
The film is directed by Anand Ravichandran, a former software official in his second project after he had previously directed the short film Kuberanum Irandu Gundargalum. Ravichandran began research on oppari, an ancient way of mourning the dead, for the film. He added that the research took to learn about Ethiopia and other rice-eating cultures including Mexico where death is celebrated, which prompted him to write it as a story.

Oppari is unique. A story telling tool about the deceased person’s life and a part of Tamil literature. It can be sung emotionally and in jest too about the deceased. There is a versatility about oppari and how death can be perceived.

— Ravichandran, about the making of the film

Television actress Srilekha Rajendran and Nivedhithaa Sathish (of Sillu Karupatti fame) play the lead roles. Nivedhithaa revealed that she plays an angry woman who is still trying to figure out her life. Ravichandran stated that "The idea was to draw a parallel between the two women whose ideologies are similar despite belonging to different backgrounds". Real oppari artists were used in the film.

The film was shot in 17 days in Appanur near Paramakudi. Ravichandran added that the weather and the "pin-drop silence" in the location were considered to be "challenging during the shoot", with Nivedhithaa adding that the team had to retake a few scenes when a sound in the background interfered. Since Ravichandran felt that he could not create the ambience of the sound during dubbing, the team preferred to use sync sound technology.

== Soundtrack ==
Sethym Aayiram Pon

Soundtrack album by Shamanth Nag
- Released: 11 March 2020
- Recorded: 2019
- Genre: Feature film soundtrack
- Length: 30:45
- Label: Divo
- Producer: Shamanth Nag

Shamanth Nag chronology
Andhadhi (2015)	Sethym Aayiram Pon (2020)	Payanigal Gavanikkavum (2022)

The film score and eight-song soundtrack is composed by Shamanth Nag who also wrote lyrics for four of the tracks, along with Raghavan and Ravi. The album also features three songs with traditional folk lyrics.

Track listing
No.	Title	Writer(s)	Performer(s)	Length
1.	"Enkonji"	Traditional	Sumana C, Shamanth Nag	03:49
2.	"Hey Oppari Kezhavi"	Raghavan, Shamnath Nag	Anila Rajeev, Shamanth Nag	04:14
3.	"Aridharam Poosaama"	Shamnath Nag	Anila Rajeev	03:25
4.	"Panjaarathu Kili"	Shamnath Nag	Nivedhithaa Sathish	03:19
5.	"Aridharam"	Shamnath Nag	Seenu, Shamnath Nag	04:58
6.	"Jaari Jokar Iyya"	Ravi	Gomathi	03:31
7.	"Kodongi"	Traditional	Dharma	04:28
8.	"Arumbu Meesakaran"	Traditional	Kalimangalam Muniyammal	03:01
Total length:				30:45

== Release ==
Sethum Aayiram Pon was showcased at the New York Indian Film Festival on 8 May 2019 and also screened at other film festivals. The film released directly through Netflix on 1 April 2020 bypassing theatrical release due to the COVID-19 pandemic.

== Reception ==
Haricharan Pudipeddi of the Hindustan Times gave the film a positive review and wrote that "Anand Ravichandran's directorial debut does not have a single dull moment". Shubhra Gupta of The Indian Express wrote that "Both Sathish and Rajendran work well together, and as they head towards an unexpected finish, we see what the director wants us to: blood will tell, and life, with all its pain and problems, is a celebration". Pradeep Kumar of The Hindu reviewed the film as "poignant" and "ironical", and further added "the title stands to suggest the worth of relationships the lead character learns about, which, for her, happens only in the event of a death".

Ashameera Aiyyappan of Cinema Express wrote "With a lot of lazy charm that is distinctive of rural life, Sethum Aayiram Pon is a film that takes its time to get going, like pastoral life". Baradwaj Rangan of Film Companion wrote "The film works because there's grace, there's a quiet dignity. Even a technique as flashy as a whip-pan becomes (almost) unobtrusive [...] the drama unfolds confidently, and with touches of humour and the flavourful dialogues are a big help"; He further lauded the film's cinematographer Manikantan Krishnamachary stating that "the shots are held for long and there's so much happening that the techniques serve the story instead of overpowering it".

== Awards and nominations ==
Year	Award	Category	Recipient(s) and nominee(s)	Result	Ref.
2019	New York Indian Film Festival	Best Screenplay	Anand Ravichandran	Nominated	
2021	South Indian International Movie Awards	Best Cinematographer	Manikantan Krishnamachary	Nominated	
