= Avinash Raghudevan =

Indian actor

- Occupation: Actor
- Years active: 2012–present

Avinash Raghudevan is an Indian actor who predominantly works in Tamil cinema. He is known for his role in the film Jil Jung Juk (2016), co-starring with Siddharth and Sananth. Subsequently, he played supporting roles in several films, such as Fight Club (2023), 29 (2026), and DC (2026).

== Career ==
Early in his career, Avinash is known for the film Jil Jung Juk (2016), directed by Deeraj Vaidy, in which he starred alongside Siddharth and Sananth. Avinash has stated that he improvises when portraying his characters. However, after the film's release, both its critical reception and box-office performance were lackluster. Avinash's performance in the film received acclaim. Subsequently, he played supporting roles in several films, such as Sethum Aayiram Pon (2020), Fight Club (2023), Retro (2025), 29 (2026), and DC (2026). Notably, his performances in Fight Club, 29, and DC once again garnered praise from film critics.

== Filmography ==
=== Film ===
Year	Title	Role	Notes	Ref.
2012	Padma Vyuham	Brother	Short film	
2014	Arima Nambi			
2016	Jil Jung Juk	Jambulingam (Jung)		
2017	Aval	Psychic		
2018	Maari 2	Vallavan		
2020	Sethum Aayiram Pon	Kuberan		
2023	Fight Club	Joseph		
2025	Retro	Prabhu		
2026	29	Mani		
2026	DC	Kitty		

=== Television ===
Year	Title	Role	Notes	Ref.
2022	Vadhandhi: The Fable of Velonie	Sanjeev	6 episodes	
2026	Local Times	Anand		
