= Jil Jung Juk (soundtrack) =

Soundtrack album by Vishal Chandrasekhar
- Released: 10 November 2015
- Genre: Feature film soundtrack
- Length: 20:33
- Language: Tamil
- Label: Think Music
- Producer: Vishal Chandrasekhar

Vishal Chandrasekhar chronology
Appuchi Gramam (2014)	Jil Jung Juk (2015)	Aviyal (2015)

Jil Jung Juk is the soundtrack album to the 2016 film of the same name directed by Deeraj Vaidy and produced by Siddharth, who also stars in the lead role alongside Sananth Reddy and Avinash Raghudevan. The film score and soundtrack were composed by Vishal Chandrashekhar, which featured five songs written by Vivek, Deeraj Vaidy and Siddharth. The soundtrack was released by Think Music on 10 November 2015.

== Development ==
The initial script of the film had no songs, and Vaidy approached Chandrashekhar only for compose the background score. However, Chandrashekhar insisted on composing a promotional song for the film, which Vaidy liked it and he eventually composed 32 tracks for the film, out of which five tracks were chosen by Siddharth. Chandrashekhar admitted that the songs featured in the film were a "[perfect] combination of weird and quirky", with Siddharth admitted as mostly being "youth anthems". The songs vary from multiple genres—R&B ("Shoot The Kuruvi"), western folk ("Domer-u Lord-u"), retro jazz ("Red Road-u") and a jazz and dubstep mix ("Cassanova").

Vivek served as the primary lyricist, writing three songs, while Siddharth and Vaidy wrote one song each. The album featured vocals by Anirudh Ravichander, Santhosh Narayanan, Sean Roldan, Anthony Daasan, Andrea Jeremiah, Kavita Thomas. Siddharth and Radha Ravi, who were a part of the film's cast, had recorded two tracks respectively.

== Release ==
Siddharth wanted to release each song from the album as singles, as "a lot of work had gone into each song, so we thought it needed individual attention", according to Chandrashekhar. The promotional song "Shoot the Kuruvi" was released with an accompanying music video by Salman Khan, on 10 November 2015, coinciding with Diwali. The song "Domer-U Lord-U" was launched by Ravi Mohan on 20 November. "Red Road-U" was released by Vishal on 25 November, followed by the fourth song "Cassanova" which was launched by Arya on 25 December. The final song "Shoot the Kili" was launched by Siddharth himself on 15 January 2016. The album, was however, released on iTunes, the same day as the first song released.

== Reception ==
Vipin Nair of Music Aloud said the soundtrack is "wacky, but highly imaginative and engaging", assigned a score of 8.5 out of 10. Karthik Srinivasan of Milliblog stated that "With its impressive range, Jil Jung Juk seems like Vishal's ticket to the big league." S. Saraswathi of Rediff.com added that "[Vishal Chandrashekhar's] background score is undoubtedly the highlight of the film". Latha Srinivasan of Daily News and Analysis noted "Vishal Chandrasekhar has delivered apt music for this eccentric film". Anupama Subramanian of Deccan Chronicle described it as "loud and feisty".

Arathi Kannan of Onmanorama wrote "The most loyal of ingredients in this explosive mix is the music and background score by Vishal Chandrasekhar. From inventive jazz, the electro pop 'red rode-u' where the composer has pulled in fellow composers Santhosh Narayanan and Sean Roldan to sing, to the addictive, lyrical absurdity carnival that is the soundtrack of the film, it's finger-tapping time on theatre seat handles all the way." R. S. Prakash of Bangalore Mirror wrote "The music of Vishal Chandrasekhar is not like the usual kind; both the songs as well as the background score follow a new style of scoring." "Shoot the Kuruvi" was ranked as one of the best Tamil songs of 2016 by India Today.

== Track listing ==
No.	Title	Lyrics	Singer(s)	Length
1.	"Shoot the Kuruvi"	Vivek	Anirudh Ravichander, Radha Ravi	4:22
2.	"Red Road-U"	Deeraj Vaidy	Santhosh Narayanan, Sean Roldan, Vishal Chandrashekhar	3:36
3.	"Domer-U Lord-U"	Vivek	Anthony Daasan, Kavita Thomas	3:57
4.	"Casanova"	Vivek	Andrea Jeremiah	4:13
5.	"Shoot the Kili"	Siddharth	Siddharth	4:25
Total length:				20:33
