= The One (2025 song) =

2025 song by Santhosh Narayanan, Sid Sriram and Shan Vincent de Paul

- Official single cover

Single by Sid Sriram, Santhosh Narayanan and Shan Vincent de Paul

from the album Retro
- Language: Tamil
- Released: 12 April 2025
- Recorded: 2024–2025
- Studio: Future Tense Studios, Chennai; The Bridge Studio, New York
- Length: 3:59
- Label: T-Series
- Composer: Santhosh Narayanan
- Lyricist: Vivek
- Producer: Santhosh Narayanan

Music video
- "The One" on YouTube

Alternative cover
- Alternative cover

Retro track listing
- 1. "Love Detox"; 2. "Edharkaga Marubadi"; 3. "The One"; 4. "Kannadi Poove"; 5. "Lose Your Fkin' Mind"; 6. "Kanimaa"

"The One" is a 2025 Tamil-language song composed by Santhosh Narayanan for the soundtrack album of the 2025 Indian Tamil-language film Retro, directed by Karthik Subbaraj and starring Suriya and Pooja Hegde. The song was written by Vivek and sung by Sid Sriram and Santhosh Narayanan, with Shan Vincent de Paul (SVDP) performing the rap portions.

The song was released as the third single from the Retro soundtrack on 12 April 2025 through T-Series, following "Kannadi Poove" and "Kanimaa". The song was also released in Telugu with lyrics by Kasarla Shyam, in Hindi with lyrics by Raqueeb Alam, in Kannada with lyrics by Swathi Shankari, and in Malayalam with lyrics by Shibu Kallar.

The title "The One" was also used extensively in the marketing of Retro before the song's release. A July 2024 promotional video introduced Suriya's character with the title, while the January 2025 release-date announcement was captioned "The One from May One". Upon its release, the song received positive response and started trending on internet. It peaked on several charts including UK Asian Music Chart and had a significant commercial success.

== Background ==
The One was composed by Santhosh Narayanan for the soundtrack of Retro. This marked his first collaboration with Suriya and eighth with Karthik Subbaraj, director of the film. (Note: Santhosh Narayanan and Karthik Subbaraj previously collaborated on Pizza (2012), Jigarthanda (2014), Iraivi (2016), Mercury (2018), Jagame Thandhiram (2021), Mahaan (2022) and Jigarthanda DoubleX (2023).) Lyricist Vivek wrote the lyrics for the song.

The film's soundtrack was preceded by the release of "Kannadi Poove" in February 2025 and "Kanimaa" in March 2025. "The One" became the third song released from the album. Coverage of the first two songs had already established Santhosh Narayanan's music as an important part of the film's promotional campaign, with "Kanimaa" receiving particular attention for its choreography and performance.

The title "The One" had appeared in Retro publicity before the song itself was announced. On Suriya's 49th birthday in July 2024, Karthik Subbaraj released a promotional video for the then-untitled film, then known as Suriya 44. The promotional video featured Suriya in a gangster-themed character and concluded with the phrase "The One".

The expression was used again in January 2025 when the makers announced the film's 1 May theatrical release. Karthik Subbaraj's announcement used the phrase "The One from May One", creating a wordplay between the title and the release date.

== Composition and lyrics ==
The lyrics were written by Vivek. The song's lyrics use "The One" as a recurring phrase and describe the film's protagonist in heroic terms. The song was described as an ode to Suriya's character in the film and noted its inspirational tone.

"The One" was described as an unconventional hero-elevation song. The track combines Sid Sriram's melodic singing with Santhosh Narayanan's vocals and rap performed by SVDP. The recording features backing vocals by Mahalakshmi, Ananthu and Victor and a chorus performed by members of the Indian Choral Ensemble.

== Release ==
The release of "The One" was announced on 11 April 2025, one day before the song's scheduled release. The third single "The One" was released on 12 April 2025. The song was released ahead of the film's audio launch, which was held on 18 April 2025.

== Music video ==
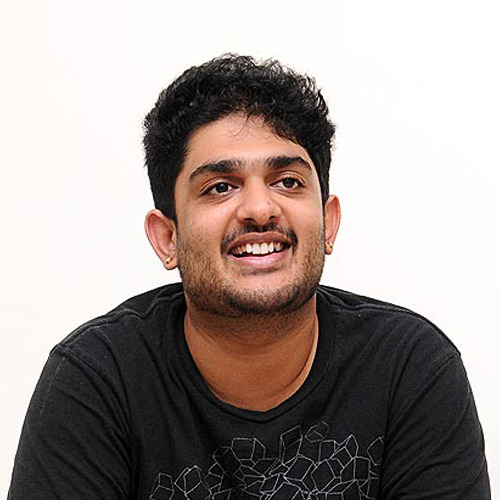
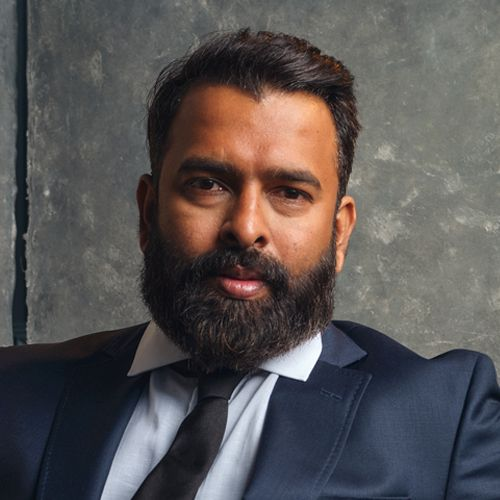
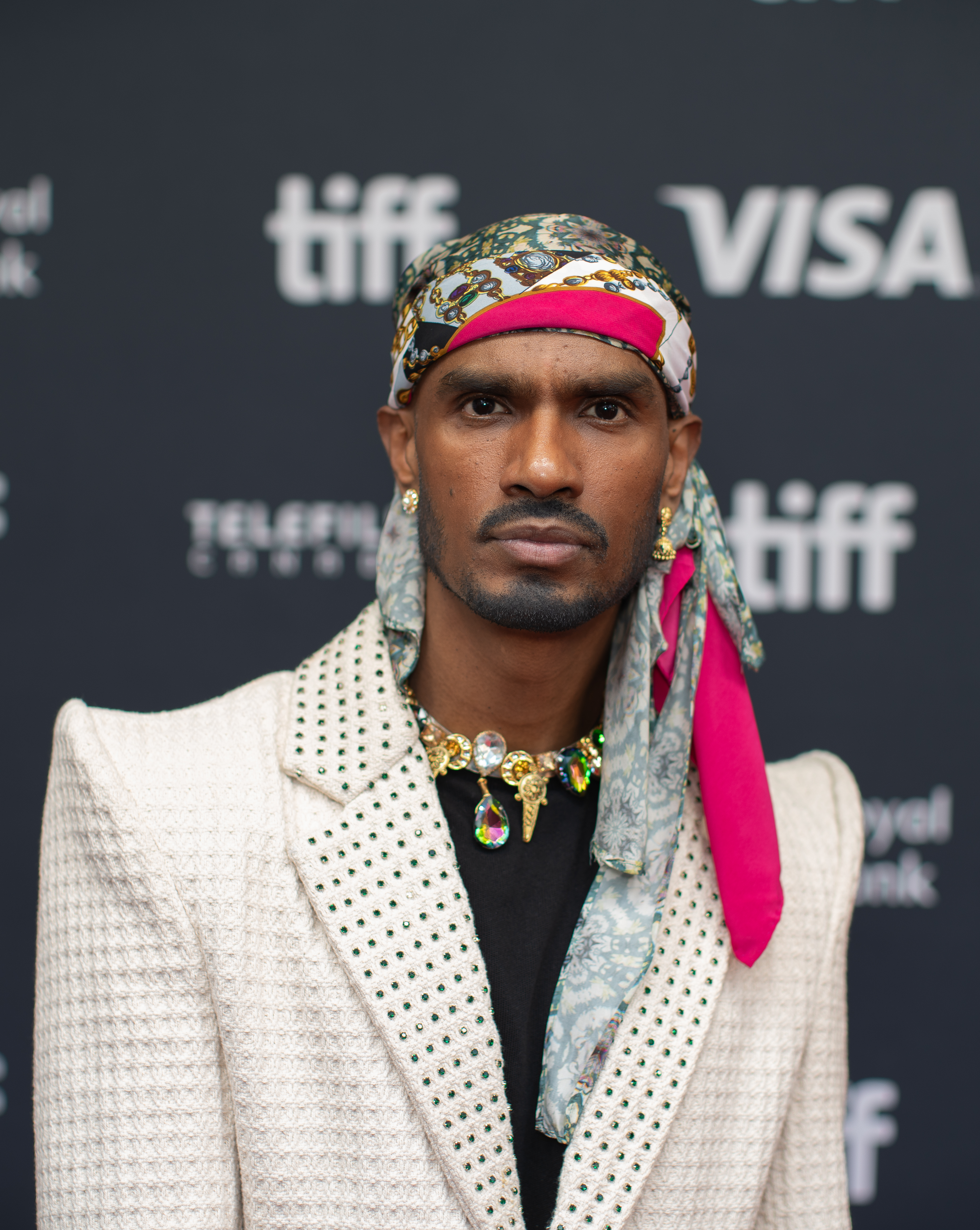
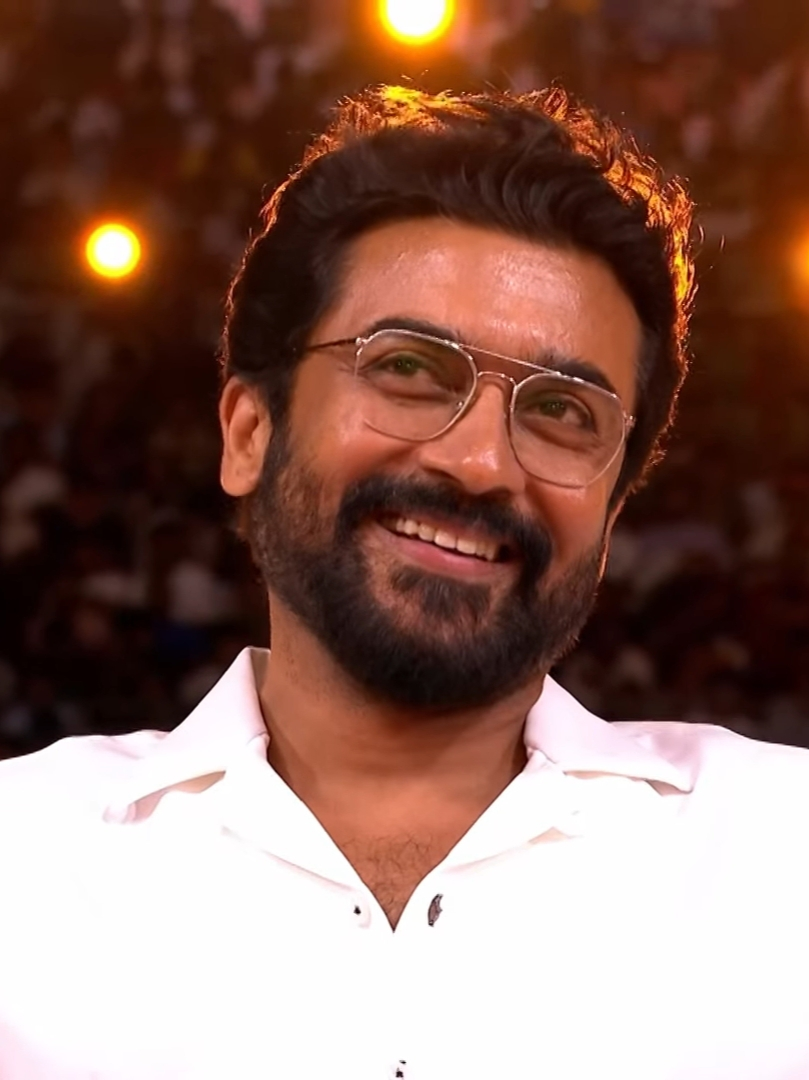
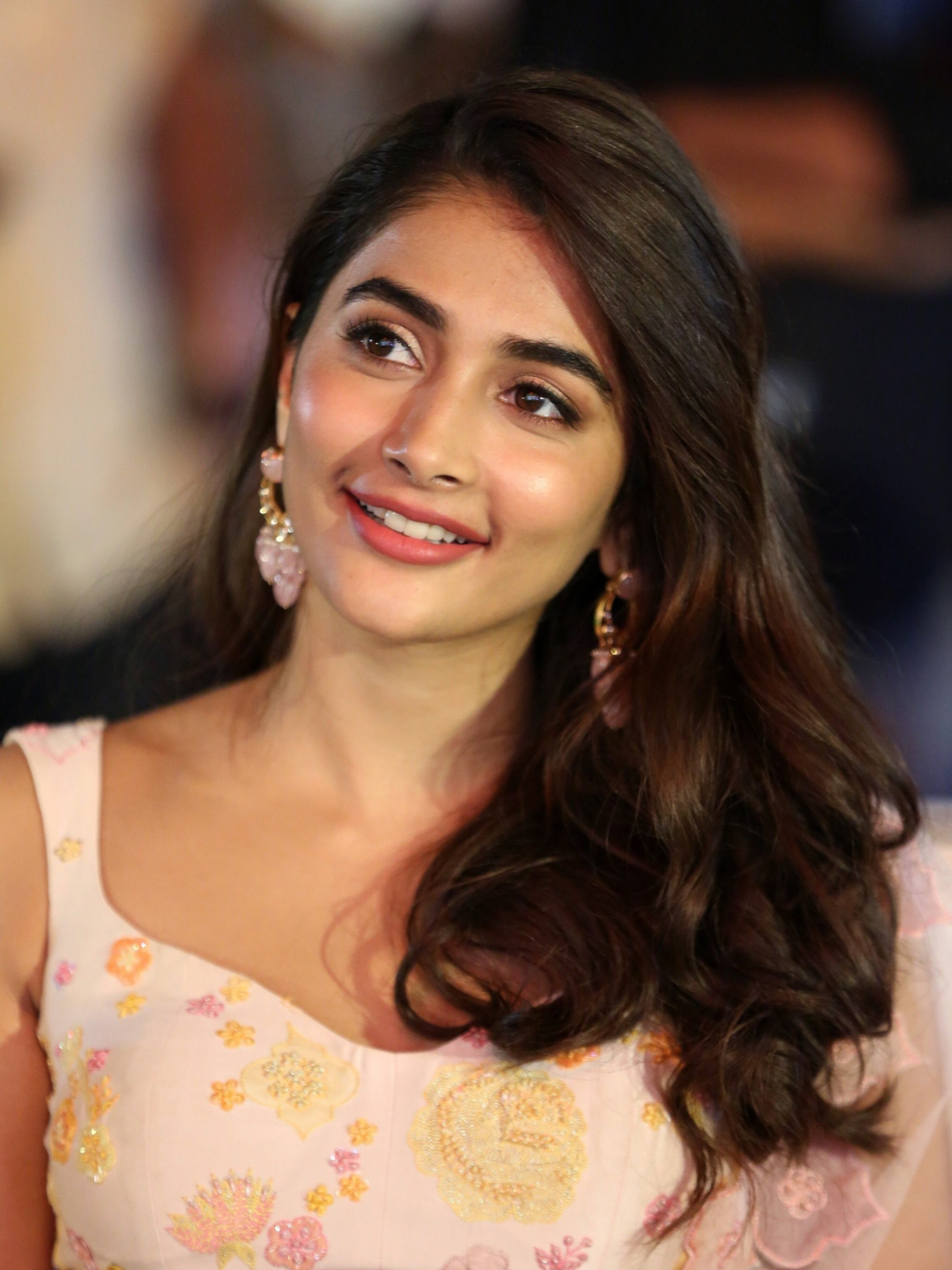
Sid Sriram, Santhosh Narayanan and Shan Vincent de Paul featured in the music video alongside Suriya and Pooja Hegde

A promotional music video for "The One" was produced separately from the songs that appear as narrative sequences within Retro. The video was directed by Ken Royson, who had previously directed music videos associated with Tamil films and independent artists. The video was cinematographed by Shreyaas Krishna and choreographed by Suren of The Dancers Club.

The music video features Suriya and Pooja Hegde alongside Sid Sriram, Santhosh Narayanan and Shan Vincent de Paul. It was released on 12 April 2025.

== Reception ==
The Statesman praised the song, stating "If you thought the first two songs gave us a taste of what’s coming, this latest track cranks up the energy to a whole new level. Sung by the incredibly soulful Sid Sriram and the ever-experimental Santhosh Narayanan (who also composed the track), ‘The One’ brings a pulsating rhythm and raw intensity. Add to that a powerful rap portion by SVDP and lyrics penned by Vivek, and you’ve got a song that’s built to dominate playlists. It’s electric, it’s edgy, and it perfectly fits the mood of a film that promises both grit and emotion."

Tivyasruthi Nair Prem Ananth of Varnam Malaysia wrote "While Sid Sriram is widely celebrated for his soulful melodies and emotive vocal style, The One showcases a completely different side of his musical versatility. Unlike his usual soft and heartfelt numbers, this track is raw, intense, and packed with energy. With a fast-paced rhythm and powerful instrumentation, every note hits with purpose, adding to the song’s bold and dynamic vibe. Sid’s vocals, combined with the gritty beats and fiery rap portions, bring a unique edge to this unconventional hero-elevation number, making it stand out in his diverse musical repertoire."

The Times of India noted "The One song sounds more like an ode to Suriya's character in 'Retro' and has an inspiring tone to it. The song has some beautifully shot visuals to go along with it." In a later article, The Times of India described the song as a combination of soulful lyrics and upbeat rap and wrote "This new track is a stark contrast to the other songs released thus far, highlighting the film’s versatility and genre-blending nature."

DT Next noted "With the powerful music by Santhosh Narayanan and impactful lyrics penned by lyricist Vivek, the song stands out with its mass elevation for Suriya. One of the lines from the single is, Vaai pizhanthe janam paarthida vaazhnthavan .... por pizhambai oru naal ezhunthaa... Sid Sriram and Santhosh himself have lent their voices for the song, which has a rap portion featuring SVDP."

Akshay Kumar of Cinema Express wrote "'The One' is a hero elevation number, which is unconventional for not being beat-heavy."

== Live performance ==
Santhosh Narayanan and Shan Vincent de Paul performed the song at the film's audio launch event held on 18 April 2025 at Jawaharlal Nehru Stadium, Chennai.

== Impact ==
Upon its release, the song started trending on internet and became a chartbuster. Following the end of 2025, Cinema Express included "The One" in its year-end music retrospective, Jukebox 2025: A year of earworms. In its discussion of mass-oriented songs released during the year, the publication singled out the collaboration of Santhosh Narayanan, Sid Sriram and Shan Vincent De Paul and described "The One" as an "elevation number for the ages". "The One" song was included alongside other major star-driven songs of 2025 and identified it as one of the year's prominent mass songs.

== Legacy ==
The phrase "The One" was subsequently used in promotional material associated with Suriya in other films.

In 2026, the phrase "The One" was used in the title-card presentation introducing Suriya in RJ Balaji's Karuppu. The News Minute described the title card as presenting Suriya as "The One", while The Times of India reported that designer Ambani had previously worked on the title card for Retro and that the "The One" title style used for Karuppu was suggested by director RJ Balaji.

The Karuppu title card received a strong response from audiences in theatres and was subsequently released online by the film's team. According to designer Ambani, the concept was intended to create a larger and more impactful presentation than his earlier work on Retro; he also said that Balaji had suggested the "The One" title style for Karuppu.

The phrase was subsequently used in the title of a song from Suriya's 2026 film Vishwanath & Sons, titled "The One Rule". "The One Rule" was released as the third single from Vishwanath & Sons in August 2026. The song is composed by G. V. Prakash Kumar with Gana Kadhar credited as its lyricist and singer.

== Credits and personnel ==
Credits adapted from YouTube:

- Santhosh Narayanan – composer, singer, arranger, programmer
- Sid Sriram – singer
- Shan Vincent de Paul – singer, rapper
- Vivek – lyricist
- Mahalakshmi – backing vocal
- Ananthu – backing vocal
- Victor – backing vocal
- The Indian Choral Ensemble – choir
- Ken Royson – music video director
- Devika Suresh – assistant director
- Ralibe Dinez – art director
- Suren – Choreographer
- Rupendar Venkatesh – mix engineer, mastering engineer
- Amon Drum – recording engineer
- Greg Tock – assistant recording engineer
- Karthik Manickavasakam – programmer, chorus, recorder
- 808Krshna – electronic elements
- Kalath Warnakulasuriya – VFX

== Charts ==
Chart performances for "The One"
Chart (2025)	Peak position
India (Billboard)	21
UK Asian Music Chart (OCC)	39

== Awards and nominations ==
Award	Date of ceremony	Category	Recipient(s)	Result	Ref.
Edison Awards	24 May 2026	Best Lyricist	Vivek	Won	
