= Retro (film) =

2025 Indian film by Karthik Subbaraj

- Theatrical release poster
- Directed by: Karthik Subbaraj
- Written by: Karthik Subbaraj
- Produced by: Jyothika; Suriya
- Starring: Suriya; Pooja Hegde
- Cinematography: Shreyaas Krishna
- Edited by: Shafique Mohamed Ali
- Music by: Santhosh Narayanan
- Production companies: Stone Bench Films; 2D Entertainment
- Distributed by: see below
- Release date: 1 May 2025
- Running time: 168 minutes
- Country: India
- Language: Tamil
- Budget: ₹60–65 crore
- Box office: est. ₹80–250 crore (Note: Retro's reported worldwide grosses vary between ₹80 crore (The New Indian Express) – ₹110 crore (Indiatimes) – ₹250 crore (News7 Tamil))

Retro (taglined Love-Laughter-War) is a 2025 Indian Tamil-language romantic gangster drama film written and directed by Karthik Subbaraj. Produced by Stone Bench Creations and 2D Entertainment, the film stars Suriya and Pooja Hegde in the lead roles. In the film, Paarivel Kannan, an orphan raised by a gangster, faces betrayal and a violent cult as he searches for his true origins, fulfils a prophecy, and tries to reunite with his lost love, Rukmini.

The film was announced in March 2024 under the tentative title Suriya 44, (Note: Suriya's 44th film as the lead actor) along with the tagline Love, Laughter, War. The title was revealed in December 2024. Principal photography commenced in June 2024 and wrapped by early October. Filming locations included the Andaman and Nicobar Islands, Ooty, Kerala and Chennai. The film has music composed by Santhosh Narayanan, cinematography handled by Shreyaas Krishna and editing by Shafique Mohamed Ali.

Retro was released on 1 May 2025 in standard and EPIQ formats. The film received generally positive reviews from critics, who praised the performances of Suriya and Pooja Hegde, first half and technical aspects, but some noted issues with the pacing and overstuffed plot. It emerged as a significant commercial success, grossing ₹80–250 crore worldwide against a budget of ₹60–65 crore, becoming one of the highest-grossing Tamil films of 2025.

== Plot ==
In 1960s Thoothukudi, Sandhya adopts an orphaned infant with a spear-shaped scar on his stomach. She names him Paarivel "Paari" Kannan, raising him lovingly, while her gangster husband, Thilagan, refuses to acknowledge the boy. After Sandhya's death, a teenage Paari meets Rukmini at their mothers’ funeral rites in Varanasi. On their train back to Thoothukudi, when Thilagan is ambushed, Paari saves him, earning Thilagan's reluctant respect.

By 1989, Thilagan remarries and has a biological son. Paari remains loyal to him and his criminal empire, though his new wife sees him only as a henchman. Reuniting with Rukmini, now a veterinarian, Paari falls deeply in love. After four years of courtship, in 1993, they plan to get married. At their wedding, Paari announces that he is leaving the life of crime. However, Thilagan accuses him of sabotaging a high-stakes arms deal—code-named “Gold Fish”—involving weapons smuggled for a prime ministerial candidate, Dharman. Paari admits guilt but withholds the location of the cache. Enraged, Thilagan tries to kill Rukmini, but Paari retaliates, severing Thilagan's hand in the process. Paari is immediately arrested and imprisoned. Heartbroken by his return to violence, Rukmini leaves him and moves to an undisclosed location.

Five years later, in 1998, Paari is promised early release if he fights for a secretive cult. Learning Rukmini is in the Andaman Islands, he escapes custody and heads there. To win her back, he kidnaps Chaplin Laali, a comedic therapist, and impersonates him. The real Laali, under duress, plays along. On the island, Paari performs as Laali and reunites with Rukmini, who is unaware of his disguise. The island is ruled by the tyrannical Lord Milton and his son, Freddie, who abuses animals and harasses Rukmini. When Freddie goes too far, Paari violently attacks him. A humiliated Freddie hires a cult leader to capture Paari. Recognizing him, the cult leader informs his boss, Michael, and alerts Thilagan.

Michael runs the deadly "Rubber Cult", with gladiator-style games between the island's rich and the enslaved poor. The matches are rigged, and the losers are fed to crocodiles by Michael's father Rajavel. Michael exposes Paari's true identity during a comedy show, shocking Rukmini, who walks away in disbelief. Paari accepts her decision and joins the cult. In his first match, Paari's brutal skill leaves the audience stunned. Michael sees Paari as a star and throws a party to celebrate. There, a drunk Paari lets slip the secret location of the Gold Fish cache. Later, when attacked by enslaved locals, they spot his scar and realize he is the prophesied child from a local legend—one destined to return a sacred spear of Jada Muni and kill Rajavel.

They reveal Paari's true identity: he was born to Pasupathy and Lakshmi, islanders who had twins—Paari, who was actually named Jada Muni by his biological parents, and a sister. Fearing Rajavel's wrath, they smuggled Paari to India. Sandhya adopted him after his protector was killed. Now aware of his roots, Paari meets his real father, Pasupathy. The next day, Paari returns to the arena, fighting for the poor. After winning, he names Michael and Rajavel the weakest, condemning them to death. Paari defeats Michael in a brutal duel but spares his life, humiliating him instead. Paari then storms Rajavel's estate. Rajavel feels insulted at being killed by his slaves, so he shoots himself, and Paari reclaims the sacred spear.

At Jada Muni's temple, Paari returns the spear to the astrologer and reunites with Pallavi and his twin sister. Rukmini, finally understanding the full truth, reconciles with Paari. He promises her that he has found his dhammam—his true path—and renounced violence. However, the peace is brief, as Thilagan, Michael, and Freddie arrive at the temple to kill them. They are shocked to find Paari's family and the islanders aiming bazookas at them—revealed to be the long-lost Gold Fish weapons. Thilagan realizes that Paari outwitted them all. Paari calmly tells his mother to fire. Lakshmi, now empowered, fires a warning shot, forcing their surrender. The next day, the islanders rejoice in their newfound freedom as Paari and Rukmini finally marry, fulfilling both prophecy and love.

== Cast ==
- Suriya as Paarivel "Paari" Kannan / Jada Muni
  - Harish as teenage Paari
  - Nithran Sai as child Paari
- Pooja Hegde as Dr. Rukmini "Rukku", a pacifist Veterinarian, Paari's love interest
  - Aavni as young Rukmini
- Jayaram as Dr. Chaplin Lolly, a humourist
- Joju George as Thilagan, Paari's adoptive father
- Nassar as Rajavel Mirasu, Michael's father
- Prakash Raj as Dharman, a politician
- Vidhu as Michael Mirasu, Rajavel's son
  - Sanjay as young Michael
- Karunakaran as Anthony
- Gajaraj as Lord Milton
- Swasika as Sandhya, Thilagan's first wife and Paari's adoptive mother
- Remya Suresh as Lakshmi, Paari's biological mother
- Sabitha Roy as Paari's biological sister
- Avinash Raghudevan as Prabhu
- Rakesh Rakku as Paraman
- Kumar Natarajan as Guruman
- Kaarthekeyen Santhanam as Hakkim
- Thamizh as Pasupathy, Paari's biological father
- Sujith Shankar as Freddie Milton
- Vettai Muthukumar as Bakyam
- Singampuli as Rukmini's father
- Sathya as Rukmini's friend
- Rajsekar Karpoorasundarapandian as a school headmaster
- Vijay Muthu as Vijay Muthu
- Prem Kumar as Murugan
- Sandeep Raj as Rangan
- Ramachandran Durairaj as Ramachandran
- MD Asif as Red Team Head
- Arul as Pasupathy's aide
- Murugavel as Murugavel
- Muthupandii as Muthupandi
- Manoj as Semba
- Yamuna as Pallavi
- Sai Dheena as Dheena
- Seemon Abbas as Hakkim's aide
- Mohan Das as an astrologer
- Aranganathan as a doctor
- Ashokraja as a jailer
- Sooraj as a jailer
- Manoj as Shanmugapandi
- Merlin as Shanmugapandi's wife
- Sathuryan as a Saamiyar
- Selvakumar as Andaman Forest Police
- Jeeva Pandi as young Paari's enemy
- Vinoth as young Paari's enemy
- Alavudeen as a convict
- Gana Kamarah as convict
- Vetri Gopi GPR as convict
- Ezhil as Anthony's aide
- Santhosh Kanna as Anthony's aide
- Naveen as Anthony's aide
- Hari Krishna as Freddie's aide
- Surendhar as Freddie's aide
- Sai Dinesh as Freddie's aide
- Giridharaja as Freddie's aide
- Shriya Saran as Blue Thorn, dancer in the song "Love Detox" (special appearance)
- Santhosh Narayanan as Innisai, dancer, musician in the song "Kanimaa" (special appearance)

== Production ==
=== Development ===
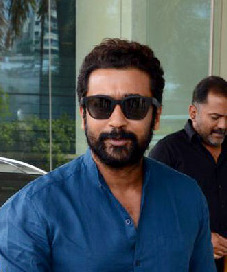
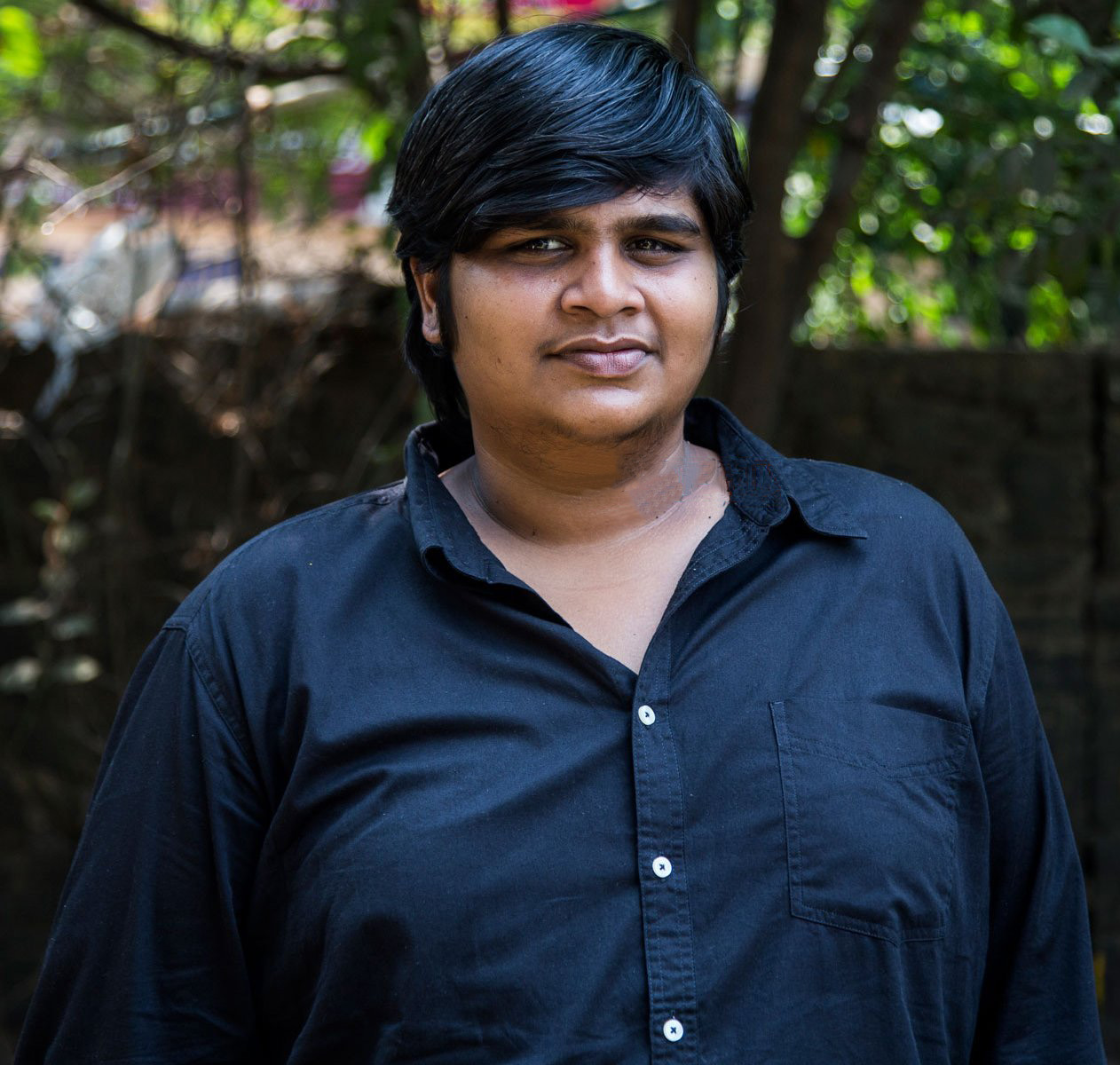
The film is the first collaboration of Suriya and Karthik Subbaraj.

While working on Mahaan in mid 2021, director Karthik Subbaraj had narrated a script to Suriya which impressed the actor. However, since the script required extensive pre-production and filming time, they decided to proceed with another script that also impressed him. Although they had finalised to collaborate back then, both of their respective prior commitments delayed the collaboration.

Two-and-a-half years later, on 28 March 2024, Subbaraj announced through his social media accounts that he would join hands with Suriya for his next directorial venture after Jigarthanda DoubleX (2023). The project would be jointly funded by Subbaraj's Stone Bench Creations and Suriya's 2D Entertainment banner. Suriya and Jyothika would be credited as producers, while Stone Bench's main producer Kaarthikeyan Santhanam would be credited as co-producer along with Rajsekar Pandian, the head of 2D Entertainment.

The project was kept confidential by the makers until its announcement. The film was made on a budget of ₹60–65 crore. Tentatively titled Suriya 44 with the tagline Love, Laughter and War, production was set to begin after the actor completed his film with Sudha Kongara which was then known as Suriya 43. However, a few days later, it was reported that, since the start of Kongara's film would take a few more months, they were planning to complete the shooting of the project in the meantime. The film was touted to be as a gangster action drama film. But Subbaraj later clarified that the film, set in the 1990s, is a romance film which also involves major action sequences. The film's official title was revealed as Retro on the occasion of Christmas (25 December 2024).

=== Pre-production ===
"It was my long-time wish to make a proper love story. And when I got a chance to make one with Suriya and Pooja Hegde, I became so excited. It definitely involves a lot of action".

— Karthik Subbaraj, in an interview

Subbaraj had met Suriya prior to the shooting of Jigarthanda DoubleX and narrated a one-liner, which the latter requested to develop. It took him several months for the writing and pre-production. Charukesh Sekar and Sritharan Someetharan collaborated with Subbaraj on the script discussion. After the release of Jigarthanda DoubleX, Subbaraj narrated the entire script to the actor. The dialogues for the Telugu and Hindi-dubbed versions were written by Hanumaan Choudary and Mohan Nair. A casting call was announced by the makers in late April 2024.

On the occasion of his birthday (15 May), Santhosh Narayanan was announced as the film's composer by the production house, in his eighth collaboration with the director. Two weeks later, the team announced that Shreyaas Krishna would handle the cinematography, in his third collaboration with Subbaraj after Jagame Thandhiram (2021) and Mahaan (2022). In addition to Shreyaas Krishna, the technical crew of art directors Jacki and Mayapandi, editor Shafique Mohamed Ali, stunt choreographer Kecha Khamphakdee and costume designer Praveen Raja were announced the same day.

In May 2024, the team shot the promotional video for the film for nearly three days. Prior to the commencement of the first schedule, the team had constructed a set at Port Blair located in Andaman and Nicobar Islands, for filming an action sequence.

=== Casting ===
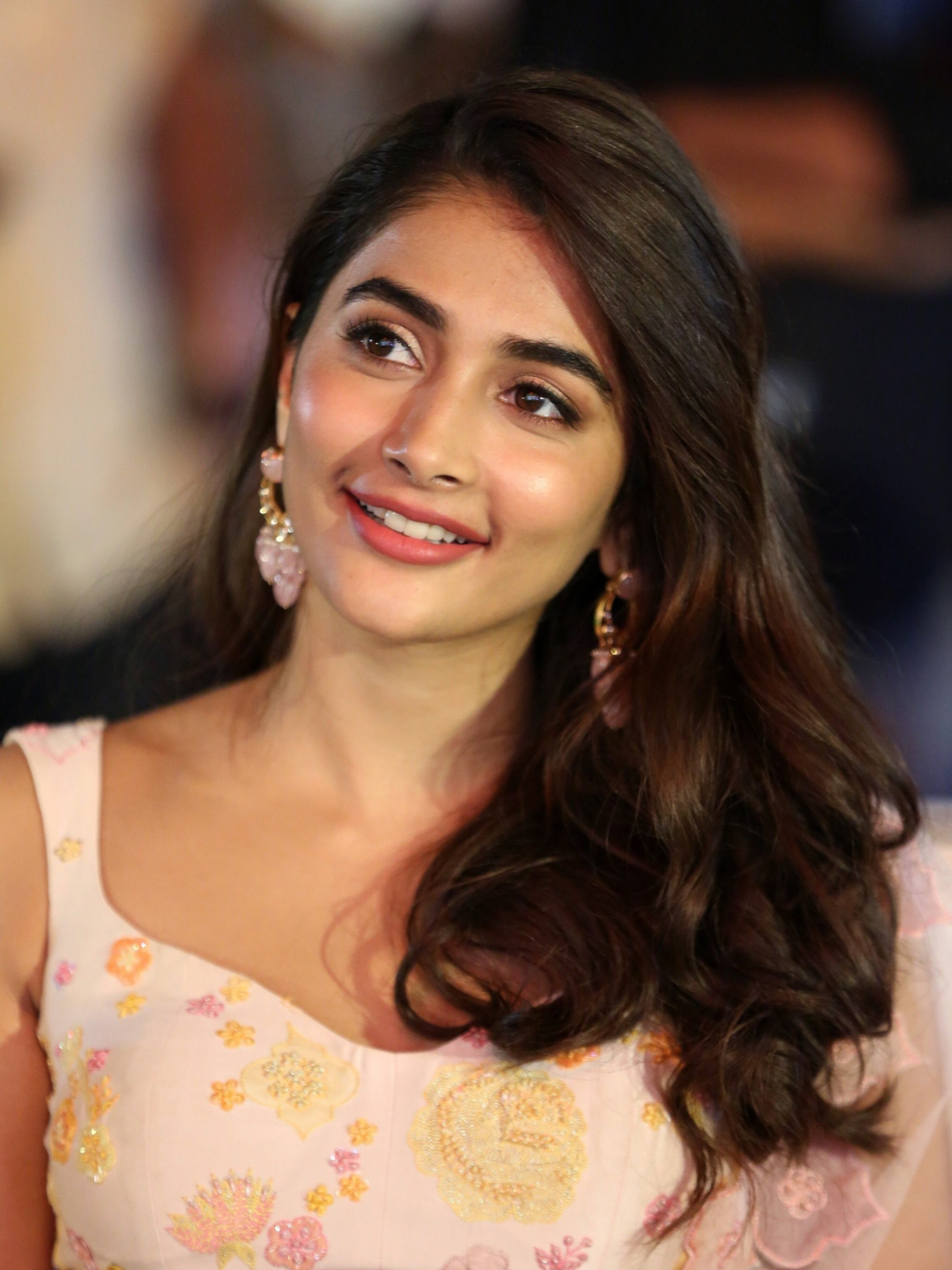
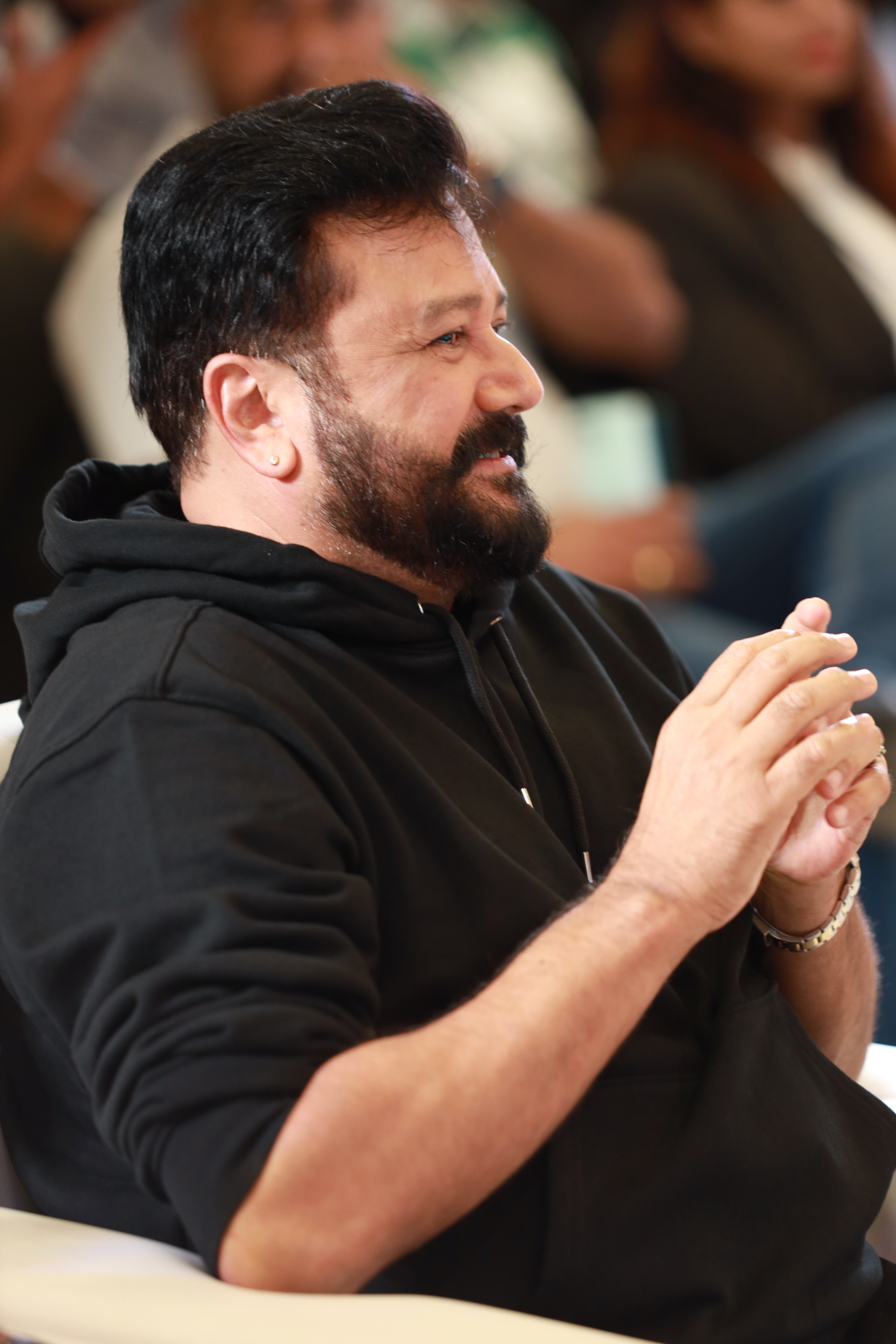
Pooja Hegde was cast to play the lead actress role, pairing opposite Suriya for the first time. Jayaram was also cast in an important role.

Suriya would sport two different looks in the film. One with a Fu Manchu moustache and mullet hair, and another with a trimmed beard, mustache, and a shorter hairdo. In mid-May, Pooja Hegde was reported to play the female lead opposite Suriya, marking her first film with both Suriya and Subbaraj. Her inclusion was confirmed on 1 June by the production house. The film would be her third Tamil film after Mugamoodi (2012) and Beast (2022). Hegde reportedly received a remuneration between ₹4 crore (US$420,000) and ₹5 crore (US$520,000). Subbaraj revealed to Ananda Vikatan that he cast her after being impressed with her performance in Radhe Shyam (2022). Following a look test, she began learning Tamil for her role. Aavni, daughter of actress Anjali Nair, plays the younger version of Hegde's character.

After initially being reported as part of the cast, Jayaram and Nassar were confirmed during the film's preliminary shooting, with both playing important roles. The former's son, Kalidas Jayaram, was also reported to be part of the cast after being spotted during the shooting, thus reportedly marking his second on-screen collaboration with his father, following Ente Veedu Appuvinteyum (2003), after 12 years. However, Rajsekar Pandian denied Kalidas Jayaram's inclusion in the film, stating, "Kalidas came on the last day shoot of Jayaram sir when the team cut a cake that has been misinterpreted." Prakash Raj would also play a role in the film, marking his fourth collaboration with Suriya after Nerukku Ner (1997), Singam (2010) and Jai Bhim (2021). Vidhu, who portrayed the role of Shettani in Subbaraj's DoubleX, would play the role of an antagonist in Retro.

Avinash Raghudevan, Karunakaran, Joju George, Singampuli, Sujith Shankar, Thamizh, Ramachandran Durairaj, Prem Kumar, Sandeep Raj and Remya Suresh were cast in prominent roles. While Karunakaran and George would make their respective fourth and second collaboration with Subbaraj after Pizza (2012), Jigarthanda (2014), Iraivi (2016) and Jagame Thandiram respectively, Singampuli would make his fourth collaboration with Suriya after Pithamagan (2003), Perazhagan (2004) and Maayavi (2005). Nandita Das would return to Tamil cinema after a gap of twelve years with this film. Although Kannada actor Dhananjaya was approached for a prominent role, he could not sign it due to scheduling conflicts. Shriya Saran joined the production in August 2024, and shot for the item number "Love Detox".

=== Filming ===
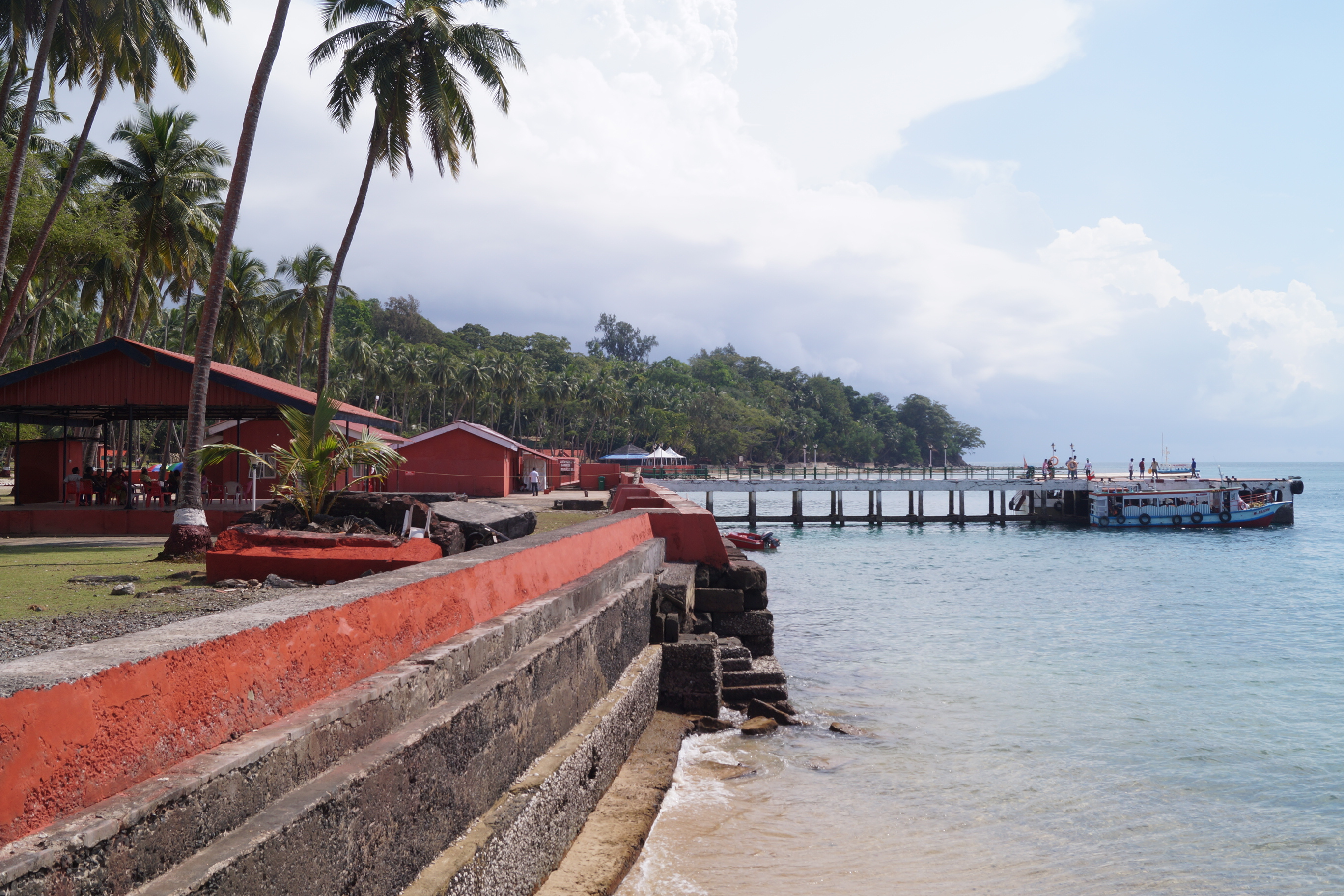
Port Blair, where parts of the film were shot.

Principal photography began with the first schedule on 2 June 2024 at Port Blair in Andaman and Nicobar Islands. Suriya, Hegde and Jayaram arrived at the location the previous day. Firstly, the team shot action sequences, choreographed by Kecha Khamphakdee, at a specially erected set. A song shoot featuring Suriya and Hegde was also held in early June 2024. Sujith Shankar joined the first schedule on 22 June 2024, while filming happening at Cellular Jail. A dance number featuring Suriya and Hegde, choreographed by Sherif Master was completed in late-June 2024. On 28 June, Joju George shared a video of himself on a boat in Andaman Island, revealing he joined the sets. The first schedule ended on 4 July 2024 at Andaman.

The second schedule began on 26 July at Ooty. This schedule was reportedly held for 15–20 days, where the team had shot few scenes at the scenic backdrop in Nilgiris. A dance number featuring the lead cast with numerous dancers was shot in late-July 2024 at Ooty. Later it was reported that after ending the Ooty schedule, the team moved to Kanyakumari on 31 July, which turned to be false. On 7 August, Suriya sustained a head injury on the sets, while filming an action sequence at Nawanagar Palace, Ooty. Although, Rajsekar Pandian tweeted that it was a minor injury, Suriya took a break from filming for a few days for recovery, which resulted in the filming being halted. On 14 August, Suriya returned to the sets to resume shooting, with several Russians and Afghans participating. Shooting reportedly happened at three hotels in the particular schedule. A song featuring Shriya Saran was shot in this schedule. This schedule was completed on 17 August 2024, with 70% of the film's shooting has been completed with this schedule. By mid-August, Jayaram completed filming for his portions.

A day later, on 19 August 2024, the next schedule was intended to begin at Idukki in Kerala for the two-day shoot; but was delayed. The schedule began with filming in Kaliyar area, Thodupuzha, at Idukki on 8 September 2024. The Kerala schedule, which went on for two days, ended on 9 September with a night shoot. The team erected a jail set in BSNL office in Chennai in mid-September for the Chennai schedule, which included a song ("Kannadi Poove") being intended to be shot. Rehearsals for the song, choreographed by Sherif was done in later days. The final schedule began in late-September in Chennai, with Suriya trimming his beard and moustache for this schedule. Hegde had completed shooting for her portions by 24 September. This schedule, which took place for two weeks, was completed by 6 October 2024, resulting in the film's principal photography being wrapped.

A 15-minutes long single shot sequence involving action, song ("Kanimaa") and drama scenes were also shot while filming. The sequence in the title teaser featuring Suriya and Hegde was shot at night in Varanasi, where 100-200 clay oil lamps were used to create a twilight effect. 80% of the film was reportedly shot on sets.

=== Post-production ===
After filming was completed, the film entered into an extensive post-production phase. Subbaraj revealed that he will spend more time for the film's post-production, resulting in the film's release plans for Pongal (14 January 2025) being deferred. Shafique Mohamed Ali renewed his association with Subbaraj after Jigarthanda Double X and handled the editing for the film. The film's visual effects were done by Lorven Studios and was supervised by S. Hariharasuthan. Suresh Ravi handled the colour grading, digital intermediate and previsualisation. S. Alagiakoothan worked on sound design and Suren G. handled the sound recording, editing and mixing of the film. Santhosh worked on the film's background score in November 2024.

Joju George completed his dubbing by January 2025, while Hegde had completed her dubbing the following month. She dubbed for her own voice, the first time for a Tamil film. The final phase of post-production began by March 2025. Suriya completed dubbing for his portions in early-April 2025.

The film's final edit was ready by mid-April 2025 and was submitted to the Central Board of Film Certification (CBFC) that month. On 17 April 2025, the film received a U/A certificate from the CBFC, with a finalised runtime of 168 minutes (2 hours, 48 minutes) after few words and excessive violent scenes were censored.

== Music ==
The music and background score are composed by Santhosh Narayanan, in his first collaboration with Suriya and eighth with Subbaraj. (Note: Santhosh Narayanan and Karthik Subbaraj previously collaborated on Pizza (2012), Jigarthanda (2014), Iraivi (2016), Mercury (2018), Jagame Thandhiram (2021), Mahaan (2022) and Jigarthanda DoubleX (2023).) The audio rights of the film were bagged by T-Series. The first single "Kannadi Poove" was released on 13 February 2025. The second single titled "Kanimaa" was released on 21 March 2025. The third single "The One" was released on 12 April 2025. The film's audio launch—which aimed to promote the music—took place at Jawaharlal Nehru Stadium in Chennai on 18 April 2025.

The album was split into A-side and B-side, A-side consisting of 6 tracks was released on 18 April 2025, B-side soundtrack consisting of 5 tracks was released on 23 May 2025.

== Marketing ==
The film's announcement poster released on 28 March 2024 became the most viewed announcement poster for an Indian film in 24 hours on Twitter. On 2 June 2024, the makers unveiled the film's "first shot" video, but the title was not revealed. It received a positive response and increased expectations for the film's title reveal. Subsequently, the video was attached for theatrical screenings. Later, after ten days of its original release, the video was released on YouTube. Akhila Menon of OTTPlay noted "The one-of-a-kind video, which is a first-time attempt in Tamil cinema, featured leading man Suriya in a never-seen-before avatar."

The film's title was to be unveiled on Suriya's birthday (23 July); however, a special promo was released on the aforementioned date, with no title revealed, but revealed that the title teaser is coming soon. It became the most viewed promo in less than 20 hours of its release. After receiving wider recognition, the glimpse was attached for theatrical screenings. On 22 November 2024, at the 55th International Film Festival of India, Karthik announced that promotions for the film would begin from the following month.

The title of the film was revealed on the occasion of Christmas (25 December) along with a teaser. It became the most watched Tamil title teaser in 24 hours with over 10 million views on YouTube. DT Next commented: "The 136-second teaser gives a glimpse into the world of Retro, with a balance of blood shed action with romance. The video begins with Suriya having a conversation with Pooja Hedge, and hints that Joju George plays the father of the lead actor." Bollywood Hungama said, "What stands out in the teaser is Pooja's ability to convey so much with just her eyes. There's a deep, unspoken emotion that speaks volumes, even without dialogue." Suhas Sistu, writing for The Hans India, noted that "With powerful visuals, a gripping background score, and seamless editing, the teaser has garnered attention for its high production values." Additionally, the title teaser managed to raise the already sky-high expectations for the film. Inspired by the teaser, the film's composer Santhosh Narayanan had shot a promotional video with his father, to promote his concert tour at Rudolf Weber-Arena, Oberhausen, Germany in June 2025. In February 2025, the teaser was attached to prints of Vidaamuyarchi in theatres. After its positive response, the teaser for the Telugu and Hindi-dubbed versions were released on the YouTube channels of T-Series on 7 February 2025.

In March 2025, when the song "Kanimaa" was unveiled, the hook step, choreographed by Sherif Master and performed by Suriya and Hegde in the music video, quickly went viral, adding to the song's popularity and becoming a social media sensation. Many people have recreated the hook step (signature step) by recording their own dance performances to the song and sharing these videos across social media platforms. The film team shot another version of the song with both Suriya and Hegde displaying joyful expressions and released it exclusively as a rehearsal video on 5 April. Later, the makers confirmed that the video was not part of the film and was shot and released solely for fans. The full song was played during the interval of Sachein re-release in theatres in April 2025.

Tuney John handled the publicity design for Retro and the poster campaign was well received. Outdoor promotions for the film began in early January 2025, four months prior to the theatrical release. From February 2025, the makers began publishing a behind-the-scenes comic strip panel leading up to the film's release. Exclusive stills from the film were released by Ananda Vikatan on 9 April. As a part of the film's promotion, the marketing team designed the film's posters at the Southern Railways. Later, Fully Filmy launched the official merchandise of Retro in April 2025.

The film's official trailer was released on 18 April 2025 at the film's audio launch event, at Jawaharlal Nehru Indoor Stadium in Chennai. The trailer cut was done by Alphonse Puthren. Praising the trailer Filmfare wrote, "The trailer showcases an intriguing blend of action, attitude, and atmosphere. Puthren's editing lends a sharp, almost rhythmic pulse to the visuals, matching the energy of Suriya's fiery character."

To promote the film's Telugu version, a pre-release event was held on 26 April 2025 at JRC Convention, Hyderabad. Sithara Entertainments hosted the event, which also saw the attendance of Vijay Deverakonda to promoting their film Kingdom (2025). On 27 April 2025, a pre-release event was held at Lulu International Shopping Mall, Thiruvananthapuram. Over 1 lakh people arrived at the venue, setting a new record for the highest attendance ever.

== Release ==
=== Theatrical ===
Retro was theatrically released on 1 May 2025 in standard and EPIQ formats, coinciding with International Workers' Day. Apart from the original Tamil language, it was also released in the Telugu and Hindi languages. Initially, the film was planned for release on the Pongal weekend but was postponed to the summer (April–June) of 2025, as Subbaraj needed more time for post-production process. The film's current release date was announced in January 2025. In the United Kingdom, the film released on the same day, with a 15 rating by the British Board of Film Classification for strong bloody violence, language and threat.

=== Distribution ===
Sakthi Film Factory acquired the distribution rights of the film in Tamil Nadu. Sithara Entertainments acquired the Andhra Pradesh and Telangana rights. Swagath Enterprises released the film in Karnataka. Pen Studios acquired the theatrical rights for North India and West India under the Pen Marudhar Entertainment banner. Vaika Merryland Release distributed the film in Kerala.

AP International handled the acquisition for the overseas theatrical distribution rights. Home Screen Entertainment bought Singapore distribution rights of the film, while Ahimsa Entertainment and Boleyn Cinema acquired the distribution rights for United Kingdom. Prime Media acquired the distribution rights for the North America and released in Tamil and Telugu languages. DMY Creation distributed the film in Malaysia. Lokah Entertainments distributed the film in Germany, while Spacebox distributed the film across Japan and Night ED Films distributed in France.

=== Pre-bookings ===
Over 3200 tickets were sold in UK on the first day of pre-bookings with a collection of £25,000 (US$34,246.58). Approximately 2 lakh tickets (excluding fan shows) were sold within 24 hours of the start of advance booking in Tamil Nadu alone. The sale rate was the highest ever for a Tamil film in the year, beating the record held by Good Bad Ugly. Booking sites of multiplex players crashed down due to high traffic.

=== Home media ===
The film's digital streaming rights were acquired by Netflix for ₹80 crore (US$8.3 million). The film began streaming on Netflix from 30 May 2025 in Tamil and dubbed versions of Hindi, Telugu, Kannada and Malayalam languages. In June 2025, Karthik announced plans to expand Retro into a 4–5 episode limited series intended for a streaming service, with new scenes and deeper content, adding that he had unsuccessfully pitched this idea to Netflix before.

== Reception ==
=== Box office ===
In India, Retro was released alongside HIT: The Third Case, Raid 2 and Tourist Family. Retro grossed ₹46 crore (US$4.8 million) worldwide on its opening day. The film grossed ₹17 crore (US$1.8 million) in Tamil Nadu, becoming the highest first-day gross for Suriya at the state, surpassing his previous film Kanguva (2024). The film had also the biggest opening for a Tamil film in 2025 in other states, surpassing Good Bad Ugly.

Retro debuted in third place at the worldwide box office in its opening weekend. It grossed over ₹78 crore (US$8.1 million) worldwide in its four days opening weekend, surpassing Madha Gaja Raja. In its first week, Retro grossed over ₹100 crore (US$10 million) worldwide, becoming Suriya's fourth film to do so. The same day, the film entered into profit zone. The film's commercial success led the team to donate ₹10 crore (US$1.0 million) from the profit to the educational NGO Agaram Foundation.

The film collected ₹150 crore (US$16 million) in its second week and grossed over ₹200 crore (US$21 million) by third week.

The film concluded its theatrical run with worldwide gross estimated to be between ₹80–250 crore. It became Suriya's highest-grossing film in his career.

=== Critical response ===
Retro received generally positive reviews from critics, who praised Suriya and Pooja Hegde's performance, Subbaraj's direction and storytelling, music, action sequences and visuals, but some noted issues with the pacing.

Krishna Selvaseelan of Tamil Guardian gave 4/5 stars and wrote "Subbaraj offers the audience old wine in an almost unrecognisably new bottle." M. Suganth of The Times of India gave 3/5 and wrote "Karthik Subbaraj's filmmaking flair, Suriya's swag and Santhosh Narayanan’s foot-tapping songs make us overlook the indulgences of the second half and the misstep of the final 15 minutes."

Latha Srinivasan of Hindustan Times gave 3/5 stars and wrote "Director Karthik Subbaraj has been someone who makes films that are a blend of genres, stylish and use music as a narrative tool. His latest film, Retro, starring Suriya, follows this same pattern and presents the Kollywood star in an action avatar with a streak of romanticism and sentiments." Pugazh Murugan of News Today gave 3/5 stars and wrote "Suriya smiles and the people smile with him. Retro is a unique mix of action, art, and soul." Avinash Ramachandran of The Indian Express gave 3/5 stars and wrote "Suriya and Pooja Hegde are compelling in Karthik Subbaraj's entertaining star vehicle that is made to serve a higher purpose, even if it goes around in circles."

Sushmitha Dey of Times Now gave 3/5 and wrote "Retro is a wild ride through love, loss, and lead bullets. If you’re in the mood for an emotional gangster drama with slick visuals, a killer soundtrack, and Suriya in top form, Retro is worth the ticket. It’s not just a movie, it’s a mood." Anusha Sundar of OTTPlay gave 3/5 stars and wrote "Karthik Subbaraj makes an indulgent film where style, action and sentiment matter, but then the familiarity strikes." Sajin Shrijith of The Week gave 3/5 stars and wrote "Suriya brings the necessary pizzazz to Karthik Subbaraj's tonally mismatched film."

Sakshi Post gave 2.75/5 stars and wrote "It's a solid comeback for Suriya and a stylish, emotional ride that proves why he’s one of Tamil cinema’s top stars. Retro could be a game-changer for Suriya, reaffirming his star power and acting range." Janani K of India Today gave 2/5 stars and wrote "Suriya, Karthik's overstuffed film stumbles between eras and ideas." Rajasekar S of The Federal wrote "Suriya stuns while Pooja Hegde puts out her career-best". He further wrote that "Karthik Subbaraj subtly conveys multiple things in the mainstream format through his characters". Praising single-shot sequence including the song "Kanimaa", he called "it's a monumental achievement".
