= Sherif (choreographer) =

Indian choreographer (born 1981)

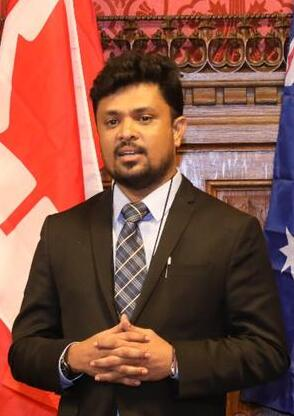
Sherif, in 2021.

Sherif, widely recognized as Choreographer Sherif, was born on April 16, 1981, in Coimbatore.

== Career ==
Sherif's career journey follows the progression of events leading from contestant on a reality show to becoming a leading choreographer in the film industry and founding his own dance school.

In 2009, he catapulted to fame by winning the dance reality show Ungalil Yaar Adutha Prabhu Deva. This victory marked the beginning of his successful career as one of the most sought-after choreographers in Tamil cinema. Known for his creative and experimental choreography, Sherif’s work has captured the attention of many prominent directors.

He rose to prominence with his choreography for the song "Kasu Panam" from Soodhu Kavvum and has since choreographed over 200 songs. His ability to craft unique dance moves even earned him the honor of making Superstar Rajinikanth shake a leg in Petta. In a relatively short span, Sherif has succeeded in the industry, showcasing his versatility and skill.

In addition to his work as a choreographer, Sherif has ventured into acting, making his debut in a supporting role in the film Vetriselvan. His talent doesn't stop there—Sherif launched Sherif’s Dance Company in Chennai, further establishing his legacy. He also served as a mentor on Kings of Dance Season 2, sharing his expertise with aspiring dancers.

A trailblazer in the dance world, Sherif recently became the first Indian to join the Global Dance Council (GDC), where he now serves as convener. As part of this role, he is developing a structured syllabus for dancers worldwide. Through his dance company, he provides cutting-edge training, offering aspiring dancers hands-on experience in the film industry and the opportunity to work on movie projects. In collaboration with the GDC, Skill India, and the Media and Entertainment Skills Council (MESC), Sherif’s Dance Company also offers teacher training certification courses for dancers.

== Filmography ==
| Year | Film | Language | No. of songs Choreographed |
|---|---|---|---|
| 2014 | Vetri Selvan | Tamil | 3 |
| 2013 | Soodhu Kavvum | Tamil | 2 |
| 2013 | Raja Rani | Tamil | 3 |
| | Sachin Anthem | Tamil | 1 |
| 2014 | Aadama Jaichomada | Tamil | 3 |
| 2014 | Cuckoo | Tamil | 1 |
| 2014 | Pannaiyarum padminiyum | Tamil | 1 |
| 2013 | Sundaattam | Tamil | 1 |
| 2014 | Yennamo Yedho | Tamil | 3 |
| 2015 | Romeo Juliet | Tamil | 2 |
| 2014 | Isai | Tamil | 1 |
| 2013 | Villa (Pizza 2) | Tamil | 2 |
| 2015 | Enakkul Oruvan | Tamil | 2 |
| 2013 | Ethir Neechal | Tamil | 1 |
| 2015 | Kakki Sattai | Tamil | 2 |
| 2015 | Ivanuku Thannila Gandam | Tamil | 2 |
| 2015 | 144 | Tamil | 1 |
| 2017 | Enna Maayam Seithai | Tamil | 1 |
| 2016 | Iraivi | Tamil | 3 |
| 2017 | Adhagappattathu Magajanangalay | Tamil | 2 |
| 2015 | Trisha Ilana Nayanthara | Tamil | 3 |
| 2016 | Pencil | Tamil | 3 |
| 2016 | Tamilselvanum Thaniyar Anjalum | Tamil | 1 |
| 2016 | Jil Jung Juck | Tamil | 1 |
| 2016 | Kanithan | Tamil | 1 |
| 2015 | Purampokku | Tamil | 1 |
| 2014 | Yaamirukka Bayamey | Tamil | 1 |
| 2016 | Meen Kuzhambum Mann Paanaiyum | Tamil | 3 |
| 2016 | Theri | Tamil | 3 |
| 2014 | Asha Black | Malayalam | 1 |
| 2016 | Darvinte Parinamam | Malayalam | 2 |
| 2016 | James & Alice | Malayalam | 1 |
| 2016 | Valleem Thetti Pulleem Thetti | Malayalam | 1 |
| 2016 | Pokkiri Raja | Tamil | 1 |
| 2016 | Oru Naal Koothu | Tamil | 1 |
| 2018 | Sagaa | Tamil | 2 |
| 2014 | Kwatle | Kannada | 1 |
| 2016 | Nambiyaar | Tamil | 1 |
| 2016 | Ko 2 | Tamil | 1 |
| 2014 | Vennila Veedu | Tamil | 1 |
| 2014 | Irumbu Kuthirai | Tamil | 1 |
| 2016 | Moondraam Ullaga Por | Tamil | 2 |
| 2015 | India Pakistan | Tamil | 1 |
| 2016 | 54321 | Tamil | 1 |
| 2017 | Sangili Mungili | Tamil | 2 |
| 2014 | Ra | Tamil | 1 |
| 2016 | Kodi | Tamil | 1 |
| 2017 | Yaman | Tamil | 3 |
| 2016 | Kavalai Vendam | Tamil | 3 |
| 2017 | Vallavanukku Vallavan | Tamil | 1 |
| 2017 | Pichuva Kathi | Tamil | 1 |
| 2016 | Ooi | Tamil | 1 |
| 2016 | Meow | Tamil | 3 |
| 2017 | 7 Natkal | Tamil | 1 |
| 2017 | C/O Saira Banu | Malayalam | 1 |
| 2017 | Balloon | Tamil | 1 |
| 2017 | Kadhanayagan | Tamil | 1 |
| 2017 | Sathriyan | Tamil | 2 |
| 2017 | Koditta Idangalai Nirappuga | Tamil | 1 |
| 2017 | Hara Hara Mahadevi | Tamil | 1 |
| 2017 | Bogan | Tamil | 1 |
| 2017 | Chunkzz | Malayalam | 4 |
| 2017 | Mupparimanam | Tamil | 1 |
| 2018 | Silukkuvarupatti Singam | Tamil | 3 |
| 2017 | Sherlock Toms | Malayalam | 2 |
| 2017 | Neruppu da | Tamil | 1 |
| 2017 | Meyaadha Maan | Tamil | 1 |
| 2017 | Pokkiri Simon | Malayalam | 2 |
| 2015 | Kalyanam | Tamil | 3 |
| 2019 | Kee | Tamil | 1 |
| 2018 | Rosapoo | Malayalam | 1 |
| 2019 | Petta | Tamil | |
| 2020 | Kannum Kannum Kollaiyadithaal | Tamil | 1 |
| 2021 | Jagame Thandhiram | Tamil | 2 |
| 2021 | Dikkiloona | Tamil | 1 |
| 2024 | Black | Tamil | 2 |
| 2018 | Mannar vagaiyara | Tamil | 3 |
| 2018 | Abrahaminte Santhathikal | Malayalam | 1 |
| 2019 | Oru Adaar Love | Malayalam | 2 |
| 2019 | Puppy | Tamil | 1 |
| 2020 | Gypsy | Tamil | 1 |
| 2019 | Sindhubaadh | Tamil | 1 |
| 2023 | Varisu | Tamil | 3 |
| 2019 | Kannadi | Multilingual | 1 |
| 2022 | Maha | Tamil | 1 |
| 2019 | Bodhai Yeri Budhi Maari | Tamil | 1 |
| 2019 | Sangathamizhan | Tamil | 2 |
| 2023 | Ellaam Mela Irukuravan Paathuppan | Tamil | 1 |
| 2022 | Taanakkaran | Tamil | 3 |
| 2021 | Jagame Thandhiram | Tamil | 4 |
| 2022 | Yenni Thuniga | Tamil | 1 |
| 2022 | Aaraattu | Malayalam | 1 |
| 2021 | Dikkiloona | Tamil | 2 |
| 2022 | Anbarivu | Tamil | 2 |
| 2021 | Bhoomi | Tamil | 1 |
| 2021 | Tughlaq Durbar | Tami1 | 2 |
| 2022 | Buffoon | Tamil | 1 |
| 2019 | Namma Veettu Pillai | Tamil | 1 |
| 2021 | Ajagajantharam | Malayalam | 1 |
| 2022 | Mahaan | Tamil | 3 |
| 2023 | Ayothi | Tamil | 2 |
| 2016 | Pencil | Tamil | 1 |
| 2023 | Agilan | Tamil | 1 |
| 2022 | DSP | Tamil | 2 |
| 2022 | Malikappuram | Malayalam | 1 |
| 2023 | King of Kotha | Malayalam | 3 |
| 2023 | Jigarthanda DoubleX | Tamil | 2 |
| 2024 | LLB: Life Line of Bachelors | Malayalam | 1 |
| 2024 | Vadakkupatti Ramasamy | Tamil | 2 |
| 2024 | Grrr | Malayalam | 1 |
| 2024 | Lockdown | Tamil | 1 |
| 2024 | Amaran | Tamil | 2 |
| 2024 | Little Hearts | Malayalam | 2 |
| 2024 | Hello Mummy | Malayalam | 1 |
| 2025 | Veera Dheera Sooran | Tamil | 1 |
| 2025 | Retro | Tamil | 4 |
| Upcoming | Aalambana | Tamil | 1 |
| Upcoming | Thadai Udai | Tamil | 2 |
| Upcoming | Diesel | Tamil | 1 |
| Upcoming | Ravana Kalyanam | Telugu | 1 |
| Upcoming | Vaa Vaathiyaar | Tamil | 2 |
| Upcoming | My Lord | Tamil | 1 |
| | Assamese Film | | 1 |
| Upcoming | Haal | Multilingual | 1 |
| Upcoming | Signal | Tamil | 1 |
| Upcoming | Sumathi Valavu | Malayalam | 2 |
| Upcoming | Vilayath Buddha | Malayalam | 1 |
| | Album Songs | | |
| 2021 | Adipoli | Tamil | |
| 2022 | Hello Kekudha | Tamil | |
| 2023 | Shoe Theriyudha | Tamil | |
| 2023 | Manjal Veyil Maalaiyilae | Tamil | |

2024 - Retro 2026 - Pavalamalli Song
