= Jil Jung Juk =

2016 Indian film by Deeraj Vaidy

- Theatrical release poster
- Directed by: Deeraj Vaidy
- Written by: Deeraj Vaidy; Mohan Ramakrishnan
- Produced by: Siddharth
- Starring: Siddharth; Avinash Raghudevan; Sananth
- Cinematography: Shreyaas Krishna
- Edited by: Kurtz Schneider
- Music by: Vishal Chandrashekhar
- Production company: Etaki Entertainment
- Release date: 12 February 2016
- Running time: 136 minutes
- Country: India
- Language: Tamil

Jil Jung Juk (transl. The Good, The Average, The Unworthy) (Note: Also the title character.) is a 2016 Indian Tamil-language neo-Western post-apocalyptic black comedy film directed by Deeraj Vaidy in his directorial debut. The film was produced by Siddharth under Etaki Entertainment; starring himself, Avinash Raghudevan and Sananth in the lead as titular roles. The film follows three characters – Jil, Jung, and Juk – who are assigned by a drug lord to transport drugs and face struggles during their journey.

Deeraj Vaidy initially produced a pilot film with two of the lead actors in 2014. Impressed by the draft, Siddharth asked Vaidy to write a full script; the draft was completed in January 2015. Principal photography was completed in 38 days. The film was shot in Tiruvallur, Chennai, and Kanchipuram. The film was officially announced in September 2015; a four-month post-production process began the same month. Vishal Chandrashekhar composed the music, Shreyaas Krishna handled the cinematography, and editing was done by Kurtz Schneider.

Jil Jung Juk was released theatrically worldwide on 12 February 2016 to mixed reviews, with praise for its offbeat elements, concept, cast performances, technical aspects, and use of colour palettes, but criticism for its pace and screenwriting. The film performed average at the box office.

== Plot ==
In post-apocalyptic Chennai, 2020, amidst huge demand for petrol and money, Deivanayagam, an erstwhile powerful gangster, gets a chance to smuggle cocaine to defeat his nemesis, Rolex Rowther. Deivanayagam hires three men – Nanjil Shivaji (Jil), Jambulingam (Jung), and Jaguar Jagan (Juk) – to safely deliver the cocaine to a Chinese gang in Hyderabad. With the help of scientist Marundhu, Deivanayagam sells the drugs by coating them in an Ambassador car painted pink so that the police would not detect them. Along the way, the trio encounters Narasimhan, who has an almost identical car.

Narasimhan eventually befriends the trio and takes them into a pub. After a drink at night, the trio escapes the pub without his knowledge but later realises that they have taken Narasimhan's car in their drunken state. Deivanayagam's assistants, Pai and Marundhu, assigned Narasimhan to steal the car and sell it to Attack Albert, a gangster. Confused, the trio goes to a film shooting spot, where they see a car used in an action sequence, left damaged after the shoot. It was later revealed that the car was thought to be the Ambassador car that Deivanayagam was assigned to deliver.

Shocked and dismayed, the trio confronts Narasimhan about his plans and takes them with his car so that they can paint the car pink and coat the stuff, but as they do not have cocaine, they decide to approach Albert. He kidnaps the trio and eventually manages to escape the location with the stuff Albert has. Rowther learns of Deivanayagam's plans and decides to have a meeting with Deivanayagam. The trio is caught and held by Rowther's men. During their business dealings, Deivanayagam reveals that the Rolex watch he gave Rowther was fake.

A gang war takes place between Deivanayagam and Rowther's men until Albert arrives and kills the two gangsters so that he can become a powerful drug lord. Albert kidnaps the trio to murder them, taking them far away. Juk's father, a bus driver, rescues the trio. They all fight Albert's men. However, Albert arrives with a Gyrojet to kill the men, but it is stopped by a marble and eventually backfires and crashes. Jil, Jung, and Juk escape the place and lead a happy life. The Chinese gang, who had been waiting for the delivery, feels dejected that Jil failed to arrive, and they leave empty-handed.

== Cast ==
- Siddharth as Nanjil Shivaji (Jil)
- Avinash Raghudevan as Jambulingam (Jung)
- Sananth as Jaguar Jagan (Juk)
- Radha Ravi as Rolex Rowther
- R. Amarendran as Deivanayagam
- Nassar as Jil's father
- Bagavathi Perumal as Marundhu
- Jasmin Bhasin as Sonu Sawant
- Naga Masi as Narasimhan
- Sai Dheena as Attack Albert
- Bipin as Pai
- Sharath Kumar as Kaali
- Aroul D. Shankar as Inspector Eswara Pandian
- RJ Balaji in a cameo appearance
- R. S. Shivaji as Juk's father (cameo appearance)

== Production ==
=== Development ===
I was having a conversation with my friend Mohan Ramakrishnan one day with whom I had studied engineering. We were discussing how interesting it would be if we could incorporate the three dimensions of physics namely mass, time and length into human characters and that is when we struck upon this new dimension of hit men and the title of Jil, Jung and Juk, which fit the characters beautifully

— Dheeraj Vaidy, on the pre-production and writing of Jil Jung Juk in an interview with The New Indian Express

Jil Jung Juk marked the debut directorial venture of Deeraj Vaidy. During his career as a software engineer, he became interested in filmmaking and had made two short films before approaching Siddharth in late 2014. He made a pilot film of Jil Jung Juk, which impressed Siddharth, who asked him to conceptualise the script as a feature film. When he read the final draft of the script in January 2015, Siddharth was impressed. Apart from acting, Siddharth agreed to produce the venture under Etaki Entertainment, making this his second film as a producer after Kadhalil Sodhappuvadhu Yeppadi (2012) and his first solo project as a producer.

The film's title Jil Jung Juk was derived from dialogue spoken by Vadivelu in Kaadhalan (1994). Deeraj Vaidy co-wrote the script with Mohan Ramakrishnan, his friend. He described the film as "an offbeat film that did not need a conventional hero". The film's technical crew consisted of relative newcomers: except for composer Vishal Chandrashekhar, debutant Shreyaas Krishna handled the cinematography, whilst Kurtz Schneider was the editor.

=== Casting ===
Siddharth starred as Nanjil Sivaji (Jil). Deeraj chose him as the protagonist because he wanted someone who never hesitates to experiment. As the film is set in a fictional world, Siddharth wore blue hair in the film, which was considered to be an "unusual look" for a man. Avinash Raghudevan and Sananth were cast in the other leading roles as Jambulingam (Jung) and Jaguar Jagan (Juk), respectively. The former was described as a "scary, yet logical guy" while the latter was described as a "constant troublemaker". Avinash practised various mannerisms for his role in the film saying, "Whenever Jung speaks, his cheek starts twitching. It was interesting to practise this, and I had full freedom on the set to come up with suggestions". Both Avinash and Sananth had appeared in the pilot version of the film, shot in 2014, with Kanna Ravi playing Siddharth's role. Radha Ravi offered to act without accepting any remuneration, but Siddharth still paid him. The film intentionally did not have a female lead actor; the only female cast member, Jasmin Bhasin briefly appears an actress.

=== Filming and post-production ===
Filming of Jil Jung Juk began in late May 2015, with portions of the film shot in Tiruvallur, Chennai, and Kanchipuram. The interior scenes were shot on sets in Chennai. The team completed the shooting in 38 days. The film's post-production began in September 2015, and the team first promoted the film to the media on 9 September. Work on the project was delayed due to the 2015 South India floods, but the team worked tirelessly so that they could complete post-production work by the end of the year.

== Themes ==
Being set in a futuristic world, Jil Jung Juk explores the three dimensions of physics — mass, time, and length — as human characters, describing Jil, Jung, and Juk. Vishal Menon of Film Companion wrote about how the film was inspired by the works of Guy Ritchie, Quentin Tarantino, Wes Anderson, Thiagarajan Kumararaja, and films starring Jaishankar. The film also explores the concept of the butterfly effect, an idea about how a small incident can cause larger effects: in a scene with Jil, there is a reference to the song "Oh Butterfly" from Meera (1992). In another scene, a flap of a butterfly's wing literally sets off a series of events. The film also had a connection with Karakattakkaran (1989): a scene in which Sananth reveals the backstory of his father, a former bus driver, who had joined Deiva's gang and had stolen a pink 1960 Chevrolet Impala belonging to Rolex Rowther, along with cash, and a heroine whom Rowther had kidnapped. Siddharth mockingly asked whether his father had kept Soppanasundari, the previous owner of that car, a reference to the plot of Karakattakkaran.

== Music ==
Vishal Chandrashekhar composed the soundtrack for Jil Jung Juk. It was released through Think Music on 10 November 2015.

== Marketing and release ==
The first look of Jil Jung Juk was unveiled to the public in late October 2015. The film's teaser trailer was likened to the works of Guy Ritchie with regards to its colour tone and background score. In mid-November 2015, Siddharth announced that the film would have a theatrical release worldwide on 25 December 2015, coinciding with Christmas. However, following the 2015 South Indian floods that occurred during early December, Siddharth announced that the theatrical release of the film would be postponed to 2016, as he and his team had to work on relief measures for people affected by the flood. The trailer for the film was released by S. S. Rajamouli, on the eve of Pongal (14 January 2016); the film's new worldwide release date was set for 12 February 2016.

As part of the promotional activities, the cast of Jil Jung Juk — Siddharth, Sananth, and Avinash – appeared in a video made by the YouTube channel Put Chutney, released before the film's release. The video, titled 10 Elements of a Commercial Film, sarcastically mocked the trend in Tamil commercial films of having the cast making a parody of their film. The video garnered attention of film buffs and more than a million views on YouTube. A Coimbatore-based startup company called Creative Monkey Games & Technologies designed an Android game based on the film and released it before the film's release date in February 2016. It was downloaded 8,000 times within five days of the launch. Deeraj Vaidy planned to launch the director's cut version of this film through YouTube on 1 April 2020. However, the video was taken down due to copyright violation.

== Critical reception ==
Jil Jung Juk received mixed reviews from critics.

M. Suganth of The Times of India gave the film 3 out of 5 stars and wrote, "To some extent, the director offsets such disappointments by providing us with a steady stream of quirkiness, but the climax, which is over-stretched and cliched, leaves us with a film that we admire but cannot wholeheartedly fall in love with." Sudhir Srinivasan of The Hindu praised the quirky ideas used in the film, but criticised the team for "encouraging mainstream and discomfiting ideas". He further went on to say, "It's all rather queer, but does oddity necessarily equate to enjoyability?" Malini Mannath of The New Indian Express wrote, "Jil Jung Juk seems more a case where the actors seem to have had more fun enacting their scenes, than what the viewers experience watching them."

S. Saraswathi of Rediff.com gave the film 2.5 out of 5 stars and wrote, "The film does have its share of laughs, but it lacks the chaos, excitement and crazy fun that would have made the film more enjoyable. The wacky entertainment that was promised in the intriguing trailer is missing. Despite its faults, Jil Jung Juk does make a decent entertainer." Latha Srinivasan of Daily News and Analysis criticised the script, saying that "it falls short of expectations, particularly in the second half", while praising the technical aspects and other novel elements of the film. Arathi Kannan of Onmanorama gave the film 3 out of 5 stars and wrote, "To call Jil Jung Juk a dark comedy could only be justified to some extent, for it doesn't employ the noir elements (popularised by Korean and Hollywood masters) like the brilliance of violence, satirical narrative or even a style statement".

In contrast, Gauthaman Bhaskaran of Hindustan Times gave the film 1.5 out of 5 stars and said the three lead actors "produce enough laughs through some great one-liners in the first half of the film; but this becomes a serious flaw post intermission, when Vaidy, who also wrote the script, runs out of ideas and begins to stretch scenes till they appear irritatingly repetitive. And the performances are passe as well, and do not add up either." Anupama Subramanian of Deccan Chronicle gave it 2 out of 5 stars and wrote, "The major drawback is its ordinary screenplay. What ideas looked great on paper, lose steam in execution and the jokes fall flat many times, especially during the latter half." Sify gave it 2 out of 5 stars and wrote, "the film is occasionally Jil (Good) mostly Jung (Average) and largely Juk (Worst)" and further added, "Just like any other dark comedies in Tamil cinema (most of them are inspired by Guy Ritchie flicks), here too each and every character has got interesting back stories and to be honest, they initially create good impression but over indulgence and repetitive gags spoils the show."
