= Norway Tamil Film Festival Awards =

Annual film festival in Oslo

Norway Tamil Film Festival
- Awarded for: Best in film
- Country: Oslo, Norway
- First award: Tamil (2010)
- Website: http://www.ntff.no/

Norway Tamil Film Festival Awards is the annual film festival conducted in Oslo to honour both artistic and technical excellence of professionals in the Tamil film industry. NTFF was arranged for the first time in 2010 by VN Music Dreams. NTFF is a celebration of global Tamil cinema.

== Film awards ==
=== Best Film ===
The Best Film has been awarded since 2010.

Year	Film	Producer	Ref.
2023	Ponniyin Selvan : i	Lyca & Madras Talkies
2020	Asuran	Kalaippuli S. Thanu
2019	Pariyerum Perumal	Pa. Ranjith
2018	Aramm	Kotapadi J Rajesh
2017	Joker	Dream Warrior Pictures
2016	Kaaka Muttai	Grassroot Film Company & Wunderbar Films
2015	Cuckoo	Fox Star Studios & The Next Big Film Productions
2014	Paradesi	B Studios
2013	Vazhakku Enn 18/9	Thirupathi Brothers
2012	Vaagai Sooda Vaa	Village Theatres
2011	Mynaa	Shalom Studios
2010	Nandhalala	Ayngaran International

=== The Most Popular Film ===
The Most Popular Film was first awarded in 2010, before being re-launched in 2013.

Year	Film	Producer
2014	Raja Rani	Fox Star Studios; AR Murugadoss Productions
2013	Sundarapandian	Company Productions
2012
2011
2010	Subramaniyapuram	Company Productions

=== The Most Appreciated Film ===
The Most Appreciated Film was first awarded in 2010, before being re-launched in 2013.

Year	Film	Producer
2014	Haridas	V. Ramdoss
2013	Dhoni	Prakash Raj
2012
2011
2010	Peraanmai	Ayngaran International

=== Midnight Sun Award ===
The Midnight Sun Award has been awarded since 2010.

Year	Film	Producer
2014	Paranoid Patient	Dhadol Productions
2013	Kumki	Thirupathi Brothers
2012	Uchithanai Muharnthaal	Global Media
2011	Payanam	Duet Movies
2010	1999	Khatpanlaya Productions

=== Best Social Awareness Award ===
The Best Social Awareness Award has been awarded since 2012.

Year	Film	Director
2023	Visithiran	M. Padmakumar
2020	Nerkonda Parvai	H. Vinoth
2017	Ammani	Lakshmy Ramakrishnan
2016	Azhagu Kutti Chellam	Charles
2015	Sigaram Thodu	Gaurav Narayanan
2014
2013	Saattai	M. Anbazhagan
2012	Narthagi; Paalai; Varnam; Vengayam	Vijayapadma; Senthamizhan; SM Raju; S. Rajkumar

=== NTFF 2017- List of Awardees - Tamil Short Film - International ===
Category	Film name	Awardee	Profile
Best Short Film	Bilboquet	Surendran T. Balasubramaniam	Director
Best Director	Don't Look Back	Navi Ananth	Director
Best Actor-Female	Don't Look Back	Raji Nesarajah	Actor
Best Actor- Male	Irumal Thaththa	Nivas Adithan	Actor
Best Story	Childhood Diaries	Shree Karthick	Director & Screenwriter
Best Child Artist	Childhood Diaries	Jayaditya Kang	Actor
Best Cinematographer	Pozhuthu Pularnthathu	Shan Manickam- Suria Boopathy	Cinematographer
Best Documentary	Ladies and Gentle Women	Maalini Jeevaratnam	Director
Special Jury Award	Vizhigal	S.V. Jeyarajah	Actor
Best Animation	Kolam Reversal	Sue Rees	Director
Best Short Film	Vanni Mouse	Tamiliam Subas	Director & Screenwriter

== Acting Awards ==
=== Best Actor ===
The Best Actor has been awarded since 2011.

Year	Actor	Film
2023	Karthi	Ponniyin Selvan: I & Sardar
2019	Karthi	Kaithi
2018	Vijay Sethupathi	96
2017	R.Madhavan	Vikram Vedha
2016	Vijay Sethupathi	Dharma Durai
2015	Vikram	I
2014	Siddharth	Jigarthanda & Kaaviya Thalaivan
2013	Adharvaa	Paradesi
2012	Vijay Sethupathi	Naduvula Konjam Pakkatha Kaanom
2011	M. Sasikumar	Poraali
2010	Vidharth	Mynaa

=== Best Actress ===
The Best Actress has been awarded since 2011.

Year	Actor	Film
2023	Sai Pallavi	Gargi
2019	Sri Priyanka	Miga Miga Avasaram
2018	Trisha	96
2017	Aditi Balan	Aruvi
2016	Varalaxmi Sarathkumar	Tharai Thappattai
2015	Aishwarya Rajesh	Kaaka Muttai
2014	Vedhicka	Kaaviya Thalaivan
2013	Pooja	Vidiyum Munn
2012	Lakshmi Menon	Kumki
2011	Richa Gangopadhyay	Mayakkam Enna
2010	Anjali	Angadi Theru

=== Best Comedian ===
The K.S.Balachandran Award/Best Comedian has been awarded since 2011.

Year	Artist	Film
2018	Munishkanth	Maanagaram
2017	Yogi Babu	Aandavan Kattalai
2016	Karunakaran	Indru Netru Naalai
2015	Vivek	Naan Thaan Bala
2014	Soori	Varuthapadatha Valibar Sangam
2013	Santhanam	Oru Kal Oru Kannadi
2012	Ganja Karuppu; Soori	Poraali

=== Best Villain ===
The Best Villain has been awarded since 2012.

Year	Actor	Film
2023	Arav	Kalagath Thalaivan
2020	Arjun Das	Kaithi
2018	Saravanan	Raatchasan
2017	R. K. Suresh	Tharai Thappattai
2016	Arun Vijay	Yennai Arindhaal
2013	Thambi Ramaiah	Saattai
2012	Sampath Raj	Aaranya Kaandam

=== Best Supporting Actor ===
The Best Supporting Actor has been awarded since 2011.

Year	Actor	Film
2023	Phathmen	Venthu Thanindhathu Kaadu
2020	Arjun Sarja	Hero
2019	Mayilsamy	Annanukku Jai
2018	Vela Ramamoorthy	Thondan & Vanamagan
2017	Samuthirakani	Appa & Visaranai
2016	Ramesh Thilak	Kaaka Muttai & Orange Mittai
2015	Nassar	Kaaviya Thalaivan
2014
2013	Joe Malloori	Kumki
2012	Appukutty	Azhagarsamiyin Kuthirai
2011	Thambi Ramaiah	Mynaa

=== Best Supporting Actress ===
The Best Supporting Actress has been awarded since 2011.

Year	Actress	Film
2023	Kovai Sarala	Sembi
2020	Aishwarya Rajesh	Namma Veettu Pillai
2017	Pooja Devariya	Kuttrame Thandanai
2016	Leela Samson	O Kadhal Kanmani
2015	Kuyili	Kaaviya Thalaivan
2014
2013	Saranya	Oru Kal Oru Kannadi
2012	Devadarshini	Mahaan Kanakku
2011	Saranya	Thenmerku Paruvakaatru

=== Best Character Actor ===
The Best Character Actor has been awarded since 2015.

Year	Actor	Film
2015	Bobby Simha	Jigarthanda

=== Best Newcomer Actor ===
The Best Newcomer Actor has been awarded since 2013.

Year	Actor	Film
2023	Pradeep Ranganathan	Love Today
2013	Vijay Antony; Udhayanidhi Stalin	Naan; Oru Kal Oru Kannadi

=== Best Newcomer Actress ===
The Best Newcomer Actress has been awarded since 2013.

Year	Actress	Film
2013	Pooja Hegde	Mugamoodi

=== Best Newcomer ===
The Best Newcomer was awarded in 2011 and 2012, before separate categories were introduced for Actor and Actress.

Year	Actress	Film
2012	Neenika	Uchithanai Muharnthaal
2011	Harish Uthaman	Tha

== Technical Awards ==
=== Best Director ===
The Best Director has been awarded since 2011.

Year	Director	Film
2023	Mani Ratnam	Ponniyin Selvan: I
2020	Vetrimaran	Asuran
2019	Lenin Bharathi	Merku Thodarchi Malai
2019	Duraimurugan V (debut)	Theechudar
2018	Gobi Nainar	Aramm
2017	Vetrimaaran	Visaranai
2016	Mohan Raja	Thani Oruvan
2015	Vasanthabalan	Kaaviya Thalaivan
2014	Bala	Paradesi
2013	Prabhu Solomon	Kumki
2012	A. Sarkunam	Vaagai Sooda Vaa
2011	Radha Mohan	Payanam

=== Best Producer ===
The Best Producer has been awarded since 2011.

Year	Studio	Film(s)	Ref.
2023	R.Parthiban	Iravin Nizhal
2020	P. L. Thenappan	Peranbu
2017	Vijay Kumar	Uriyadi
2016	JSK Film Corporation	Kuttram Kadithal
2015	Camphor Cinema	Ramanujan
2014
2013	Thirupathi Brothers	Vazhakku Enn 18/9 / Kumki
2012	Escape Artists Motion Pictures	Azhagarsamiyin Kuthirai
2011	Sun Pictures	Enthiran

=== Best Cinematographer ===
The Best Cinematographer has been awarded since 2011.

Year	Cinematographer	Film
2023	Yamini Yagnamurthy	Saani Kayidham
2020	Kishore Kumar	Gundu
2019	Theni Eswar	Merku Thodarchi Malai (western ghats)
2017	S. R. Kathir	Kidaari
2016	P. C. Sriram	I & O Kadhal Kanmani
2015	Vetrivel Mahendran	Kayal
2014	Chezhiyan	Paradesi
2013	M. Sukumar	Kumki
2012	Richard M. Nathan	Ko
2011	M. Sukumar	Mynaa

=== Best Editor ===
The Best Editor has been awarded since 2011.

Year	Editor	Film
2023	Philomin Raj	Vikram
2020	Philomin Raj	Kaithi
2017	Sreejith Sarang	Dhuruvangal Pathinaaru
2016	Kishore T. E.	Kaaka Muttai
2015	Vivek Harshan	Jigarthanda
2014
2013	Govindaraj	Naduvula Konjam Pakkatha Kaanom
2012	Kola Bhaskar	Mayakkam Enna
2011	Anthony	Vinnaithaandi Varuvaayaa

=== Best Screenplay ===
The Best Screenplay has been awarded since 2011.

Year	Writer	Film
2023	Lokesh Kanagaraj	Vikram
2020	Magizh Thirumeni	Thadam
2019	Nelson Dilipkumar	Kolamavu Kokila
2017	Karthick Naren	Dhuruvangal Pathinaaru
2016	Gautham Vasudev Menon	Yennai Arindhaal
2013	Karthik Subbaraj	Pizza
2012	Suseenthiran	Azhagarsamiyin Kuthirai
2011	Seenu Ramasamy	Thenmerku Paruvakaatru

=== Best Story Writer ===
The Best Story Writer has been awarded since 2012.

Year	Writer	Film
2013	Balaji Tharaneetharan	Naduvula Konjam Pakkatha Kaanom
2012	Pugazhendi Thangaraj	Uchithanai Muharnthaal

=== Best Choreographer ===
The Best Choreographer has been awarded since 2011.

Year	Choreographer	Song	Film
2023	Jani Master	"Arabic Kuthu"	Beast
2022	Gayathri Raguram	"Kunnum Kunnum Pesa Pesa"	Thalaivii
2020	Shobi Paulraj	"Verithanam"	Bigil
2013	Shobi Paulraj	"Irukkana"	Nanban
2012	Bobby Antony	"Sara Sara Saara Kathu"	Vaagai Sooda Vaa
2011	Dinesh	"Otha Sollala"	Aadukalam

=== Best Stunt Choreographer ===
The Best Stunt Choreographer has been awarded since 2011.

Year	Choreographer	Film
2023	Anbariv	Vikram
2020	Peter Hein	Asuran
2012	Peter Hein; Ganesh Babu	Ko; Mahaan Kanakku
2011	Action Prakash	Yuddham Sei

=== Best Art Director ===
The Best Art Director has been awarded since 2012.

Year	Art Director	Film
2012	Seenu	Vaagai Sooda Vaa

=== Best Costume Designer ===
The Best Costume Designer has been awarded since 2012.

Year	Designer	Film
2012	Natraj	Vaagai Sooda Vaa

=== Best Make-Up Artiste ===
The Best Make-Up Artiste has been awarded since 2011.

Year	Designer	Film
2012	K. P. Sasikumar	Vaagai Sooda Vaa
2011	Banu	Enthiran

=== Best Visual Effects ===
The Best Visual Effects has been awarded since 2011.

Year	Designer	Film
2011	Stan Winston Studios	Enthiran

=== Best Dubbing Artiste ===
The Best Dubbing Artiste has been awarded since 2012.

Year	Artist	Film	Dubbed for
2012	Deepa Venkat	Mayakkam Enna	Richa Gangophydhay
2019	Chinmayi Sripata	96	Trisha Krishnan

== Music Awards ==
=== Best Music Director ===
The Best Music Director has been awarded since 2011.

Year	Artist	Film	Ref
2023	A. R. Rahman	Ponniyin Selvan: I & Iravin Nizhal
2017	Sean Roldan	Joker
2016	M. Ghibran	Uttama Villain
2015	Santhosh Narayanan	Cuckoo & Jigarthanda
2014	A. R. Rahman	Kadal and Maryan
2013	D. Imman	Kumki
2012	Ilaiyaraaja	Azhagarsamiyin Kuthirai
2011	G. V. Prakash Kumar	Madrasapattinam
2011	G. V. Prakash Kumar	"Pookal Pookum for Best song of the year" for Madrasapattinam

=== Best Male Playback Singer ===
The Best Male Playback Singer has been awarded since 2012.

Year	Artist	Song	Film
2023	Danush	"Megham Karukatha"	Thiruchitrambalam
2017	Pradeep Kumar	"Maya Nadhi"	Kabali
2016	Benny Dayal	"Unnakenna Venum Sollu"	Yennai Arindhaal
2015	Haricharan	"Sandi Kuthirai"	Kaaviya Thalaivan
2014	Sriram Parthasarathy	"Aanandha Yaazhai"	Thanga Meengal
2013	S. P. Balasubrahmanyam	"Vaangam Panathukkum"	Dhoni
2012	C. Sathya	"Maasama"	Engeyum Eppodhum

=== Best Female Playback Singer ===
The Best Female Playback Singer has been awarded since 2012.

Year	Artist	Song	Film
2023	Madhushree Bhattacharya	"Mallipoo Vatchu"	Venthu Thanindhathu Kaadu
2019	Chinmayi	"Kaathalae Kaathalae"	96
2018	Shreya Ghoshal	"Neethanae"	Mersal
2017	Nandini Srikar	"Kannamma Kannamma"	Rekka
2016	Lalitha Vijayakumar	"Vaadi Raasathi"	36 Vayadhinile
2015	Vaikom Vijayalakshmi	"Pudhiya Ulagai"	Yennamo Yedho
2014	Shakthisree Gopalan	"Nenjukulle" "Enga Pona Raasa"	Kadal; Maryan
2013	Magizhini Manimaaran	"Soi Soi"	Kumki
2012	Chinmayi	"Sara Sara"	Vaagai Sooda Vaa

=== Best Lyricist ===
The Best Lyricist has been awarded since 2011.

Year	Poet	Song	Film
2023	Ilango Krishnan	"'Ponni Nathi Parkanume"	Ponniyin Selvan: I
2017	Uma Devi		Kabali
2016	Madhan Karky		I & Baahubali
2015	Yugabharathi		Cuckoo
2014	Na. Muthukumar	"Aanandha Yaazhai"	Thanga Meengal
2013	Na. Muthukumar	"Vilayatta Padagoti "	Dhoni
2012	Kasi Anandhan		Uchithanai Muharnthaal
2011	Na. Muthukumar	"Pookal Pookum"	Madrasapattinam

== Special awards ==
=== Special Jury Award ===
The Special Jury Award has been awarded since 2012.

Year	Winner	Artist	Film
2023	Actor	R.Madhavan	Rocketry: The Nambi Effect
2022	Actor	Arvind Swamy	Thalaivii
2019	Actress	Keerthy Suresh	Nadigaiyar Thilagam
2015	Actor	Vincent	Kayal
2013	Film	Eelan Elango	Iniyavale Kathiruppen
2012	Actor	Vishal Krishna	Avan Ivan

=== Kalaichchigaram Award ===
The Kalaichchigaram Award has been awarded since 2011.

2023	Rajkiran [Actor – Director – Producer]
2020	Suriya
2019	Vivek
2018	Charlie
2017	Prabhu
2016	Prakash Raj
2015	Sivakumar
2013	Sarathkumar
2012	Sathyaraj
2011	Cheran

=== Balu Mahendra Award ===
The Balu Mahendra Award has been awarded since 2015.

Year	Artist	Film
2023	Seenu Ramasamy	Maamanithan
2017	S. J. Surya	Iraivi
2016	Vijay Sethupathi	Orange Mittai
2015	R. Parthiepan	Kathai Thiraikathai Vasanam Iyakkam

=== K. S. Balachandran Award ===
The K.S.Balachandran Award/Best Comedian has been awarded since 2011.

Year	Artist	Film
2023	Jayaram	Ponniyin Selvan: I
2017	Yogi Babu	Aandavan Kattalai
2016	Karunakaran	Indru Netru Naalai
2015	Vivek	Naan Thaan Bala
2014	Soori	Varuthapadatha Valibar Sangam
2013	Santhanam	Oru Kal Oru Kannadi
2012	Ganja Karuppu; Soori	Poraali

=== Lifetime achievement award ===
The Special Jury Award has been awarded since 2012.

Year	Artist
2023	Radhika Sarathkumar
2019	Mahendran
2018	Bharathiraja
2017	T. Rajendar
2016	Kamal Haasan
2015	K. Balachander
2014	Manorama
2013	Manivannan
2012	A. Ragunathan
