= Kozhipannai Chelladurai =

Indian Tamil-language drama film written and directed by Seenu Ramasamy

- Theatrical release poster
- Directed by: Seenu Ramasamy
- Written by: Seenu Ramasamy
- Produced by: D. Arulanandhu; Mathewo Arulanandhu
- Starring: Aegan; Yogi Babu; Brigida Saga; Sathya Devi
- Cinematography: Ashokraj
- Edited by: Sreekar Prasad
- Music by: N. R. Raghunanthan
- Production company: Vision Cinema House
- Distributed by: Sakthi Film Factory
- Release dates: 18 September 2024 (Oakland); 20 September 2024 (India); (Note: The 22nd Oakland International Film Festival)
- Running time: 122 minutes
- Country: India
- Language: Tamil

Kozhipannai Chelladurai is a 2024 Indian Tamil-language drama film written and directed by Seenu Ramasamy and produced by Dr. D. Arulanandhu under his Vision Cinema House banner. The film stars Aegan, Yogi Babu, Brigida Saga, Sathya Devi in the lead role, alongside Aishwarya Dutta, Bava Chelladurai and Manasvi Kottachi in supporting roles. Its score was composed by N. R. Raghunanthan, the cinematography handled by Ashokraj, and editing by Sreekar Prasad.

The film was selected at the 22nd Oakland International Film Festival, where it was screened on September 18, 2024. It was released in theatres on 20 September 2024.

== Plot ==
Chelladurai's life was shattered when his father, Viruman, discovered his mother, Chitra, having an affair. Catching them red-handed, Chitra abandoned her family. Viruman took his adolescent son and daughter to their grandmother's house, leaving them in her care. Tragedy struck again when their grandmother died, leaving young Chelladurai responsible for earning a living and caring for his younger sister, Sudha Maheshwari "Sudha". Fortunately, Periyasamy, a village man in a chicken farm helped him secure a job as a watchman in the same farm to ensure their survival.

Twelve years passed, and Chelladurai is now a butcher in Periyasamy's chicken shop in the market. In the same market, Senthamaraiselvi "Thamarai" runs a pottery shop and harbors secret feelings for Chelladurai. However, he doesn't reciprocate her love. Chelladurai takes on additional meager jobs to supplement his income to own a house, establish an independent chicken farm, and save for Sudha's marriage.

Sudha secretly falls in love with Soundar, the college librarian Mohan's son. When Chelladurai discovers their relationship, he violently confronts Soundar, who narrowly escapes. Enraged, Chelladurai lashes out at Sudha. Determined to marry her off, he searches for a suitable groom but eventually accepts Soundar after verifying his family background.

During wedding preparations, Chelladurai encounters his estranged mother, Chitra now a beggar, suffering from memory loss. Chelladurai admits her to a mental asylum and after Sudha's marriage to Soundar, Chelladurai arranges for her to meet their mother. Sudha encourages Thamarai to marry Chelladurai, stating he cannot stay single forever. Chelladurai once confides to Periyasamy that he rescued his mother solely out of mercy, not affection.

Later a young girl introduces herself as Maheshwari, his half-sister, and takes him to Viruman, his ailing father. Chelladurai though shocked to find Viruman in a pitiful state, is moved by Maheshwari's request, he rescues Viruman and even donates one of his kidneys to save his life. He finally accepts Thamarai's love and is seen caring for his mother, having forgiven her past transgressions.

== Cast ==
- Aegan as Chelladurai
- Yogi Babu as Periyasamy
- Brigida Saga as Senthamaraiselvi "Thamarai"
- Sathya Devi as V. Sudha Maheshwari "Sudha"
- Kutti Puli Dinesh as Chelladurai's friend
- Leo Sivakumar as M. Soundar, Mohan's son
- Aishwarya Dutta as Chitra
- Bava Chelladurai as Mohan, chief librarian
- Manasvi Kottachi as Maheshwari, Chelladurai's half-sister
- Jeeva Subramanian as a social activist
- Seenu Ramasamy in a cameo appearance as a beggar
- Mohan Babu AVP as Village Man

== Production ==
After Maamanithan (2022), director Seenu Ramasamy announced his new project titled Kozhipannai Chelladurai on 23 November 2023 and the filming began on the same day after a formal pooja ceremony at the Periyakulam Balasubramanian temple. The entire schedule was filmed around Theni and Andipatti where a market set was erected. The entire filming was completed in 32 days on 24 December 2023.

== Music ==
Kozhipannai Chelladurai

Soundtrack album by N. R. Raghunanthan
- Released: 19 September 2024
- Genre: Feature film soundtrack
- Language: Tamil
- Label: Divo Music
- Producer: N. R. Raghunanthan

N. R. Raghunanthan chronology
Pogumidam Vegu Thooramillai (2024)	Kozhipannai Chelladurai (2024)	Marutham (2025)

Singles from Kozhipannai Chelladurai
- 1. "Kathirundhen" Released: 7 September 2024; 2. "Ponnana Pottapulla" Released: 10 September 2024; 3. "Dhevathai" Released: 17 September 2024

Audio Juke Box
- Kozhipannai Chelladurai - Audio Juke Box on YouTube

The music and background score is composed by N. R. Raghunanthan, in his third collaboration with Seenu Ramasamy after Thenmerku Paruvakaatru (2010) and Neerparavai (2012). The first single, "Kathirundhen" released on 7 September 2024. The audio launch was held on 10 September 2024 in Chennai. The second single track "Ponnana Pottapulla" was released, which had vocals performed by Anand Aravindakshan and Saindhavi and lyrics penned by Vairamuthu. The third single, "Dhevathai" released on 17 September 2024. The album featuring five songs was released on 19 September with three of them being previously released as singles.

Track listing
No.	Title	Writer(s)	Singer(s)	Length
1.	"Kathirundhen"	Gangai Amaran	Chinmayi Sripaada	5:03
2.	"Ponnana Pottapulla"	Vairamuthu	Anand Aravindakshan, Saindhavi	5:18
3.	"Dhevathai"	Ekadasi	Surya Zatrix	3:40
4.	"Yelay Yelay"	Pa. Vijay	S. P. Charan	4:33
5.	"Kaiyenthi"	Pa. Vijay	Vijay Yesudas	5:31
Total length:				24:05

== Release ==
Kozhipannai Chelladurai had its world premiere on 18 September 2024, at the 22nd Oakland International Film Festival.

=== Theatrical ===
The film got released theatrically on 20 September 2024. The film received an U-certificate from the CBFC with a runtime of 122 minutes.

=== Home media ===
Kozhipannai Chelladurai began streaming on Simply South from 24 October 2024 worldwide, excluding India.

=== Marketing ===
On 1 January 2024, the first look of the film featuring Yogi Babu and Aegan who was last seen in Joe (2023) in a supporting role was released. On 11 January, Seenu Ramasamy in his social media handles said that this film is a tribute to the late actor and politician Vijayakanth. Actor Soori released the film teaser on 14 August and the trailer was released on 2 September which was well received.

== Reception ==
Abhinav Subramanian of The Times of India rated two point five out of five and stated that "Aegan carries much of the film’s emotional weight, while Sathya Devi brings authenticity to her role as Chelladurai’s sister. Yogi Babu delivers his lines with characteristic flair, even if the comedic writing doesn’t always hit the mark."

Akshay Kumar of Cinema Express gave 2.5/5 stars and wrote "Seenu Ramasamy's Kozhipannai Chelladurai is yet another story of his that breaks the facade of strength to expose a man's emotional and psychological fragility, not by any nuclear weapon but something as simple as a lack of warmth and reassurance, which are by far the most lethal weapons."

== Accolades ==
Kozhipannai Chelladurai became the first film to be selected to screen at the Oakland International Film Festival on 18 September 2024. Sathya Devi won the Best Actress award at the 10th Top Indie Film Awards, (Note: 10th Top Indie Film Awards, Japan) while the film was nominated under two other categories namely, the Best Feature and Best Cinematography.
