= Idam Porul Yaeval =

Unreleased film by Seenu Ramasamy

- Poster
- Directed by: Seenu Ramasamy
- Written by: Seenu Ramasamy
- Story by: S. Ramakrishnan
- Produced by: N. Lingusamy (Presenter); N. Subash Chandra Bose
- Starring: Vijay Sethupathi; Vishnu Vishal; Aishwarya Rajesh; Nandita Swetha
- Cinematography: Ragul Dharuman
- Edited by: Kasi Viswanathan
- Music by: Yuvan Shankar Raja
- Production company: Thirupathi Brothers
- Distributed by: Tag Entertainment
- Country: India
- Language: Tamil

Idam Porul Yaeval (transl. Place, Nuance and Execution) is an unreleased Indian Tamil language film directed by Seenu Ramasamy and produced by N. Lingusamy. It stars Vijay Sethupathi, Vishnu Vishal Aishwarya Rajesh and Nandita Swetha. Yuvan Shankar Raja composed the music. The film remains unreleased for a decade due to financial difficulties.

== Cast ==
- Vijay Sethupathi as Paandi
- Vishnu Vishal as Aasaithambi
- Aishwarya Rajesh as Rithika
- Nandita Swetha as Neetha
- Vadivukkarasi
- Bala Saravanan
- Azhagam Perumal
- Aruldoss
- Ilavarasu
- Theepetti Ganesan
- Florent Pereira

== Production ==
Following the audio release of Neerparavai (2012), Seenu Ramasamy announced that his next project would be titled Bangalore Thamizhan to be produced by Vasan Visual Ventures and revealed that Vimal had been signed to play a lead role in October 2012. In January 2013, Seenu Ramasamy revealed that Vijay Sethupathi was signed on to play another lead role and that the film will be based around the hills near Madurai and Thandikodi near Kodaikanal, noting that he engaged in research while filming Thenmerku Paruvakaatru (2010) in interior Tamil Nadu, spending a lot of time studying locations near the Kodalangadu village. The film's story was an idea of writer S. Ramakrishnan and Ramasamy developed the screenplay and dialogues.

In May 2013, the film went through significant changes, with the title being changed to Sontha Ooru while Attakathi Dinesh replaced Vimal in a lead role. In a further turn of events in October 2013, it was announced that N. Linguswamy would produce the film and Yuvan Shankar Raja would replace N. R. Raghunanthan as composer. The title was also reverted to Idam Porul Yaeval, while Vishnu Vishal was selected to replace Dinesh. In February 2014, Manisha Yadav was signed for the role of a mountain farmer girl after the director had auditioned a few girls for the role. Soon after the shoot had started, Seenu Ramasamy replaced Manisha with Nandita Swetha. In April 2014, Aishwarya Rajesh confirmed that she had signed the film and would play Vishnu's love interest. Mu. Kasi Viswanathan was signed up to be the film's editor and Rahul Dharuman of Madha Yaanai Koottam (2013) fame was roped in to be the cinematographer.

Shooting took place around the villages surrounding Kodaikanal, which include Poombarai, Padamputhur and Gundupatti.

== Soundtrack ==
Director Seenu Ramasamy and Vijay Sethupathi, for the first time, worked with Yuvan Shankar Raja to produce Idam Porul Yaeval's music. The lyrics were written by Vairamuthu, thus associating with Yuvan for the first time in his career. The soundtrack album features six tracks and most of the songs were composed after the entire film was shot. The album was released on 18 December 2014 at the Suryan FM radio station in Chennai. The songs, however, had been leaked to the Internet several days before the actual launch.

All lyrics are written by Vairamuthu.

Track listing
No.	Title	Singer(s)	Length
1.	"Eerakkaathae"	Senthildass Velayutham, Anitha	6:06
2.	"Kurunthogai"	V. V. Prassanna, Sonia	3:40
3.	"Endha Vazhi"	Vaikom Vijayalakshmi	4:34
4.	"Kondaatamae"	Sriram Parthasarathy	4:55
5.	"Atthuvaana Kaatukku"	Yuvan Shankar Raja	4:05
6.	"Vaiyambatti"	Anthony Dassan, Priyadarshini	4:09
Total length:			27:31

=== Reception ===
Sify gave 3.5 out of 5 and wrote, "Idam Porul Eval marks Yuvan's comeback to earthy tunes without the music jarring the lyrical content".

== Release ==
Despite being completed, the film has remained unreleased as a result of Thirupathi Brothers' financial difficulties. After a long delay, the film was expected to be released after the end of the COVID-19 lockdown in India, to no avail. In October 2022, it was announced that the film will soon have a theatrical release as the production house has sorted out all legal issues.
