= Maamanithan (2022 film) =

Tamil drama film directed by Seenu Ramasamy

- Theatrical release poster
- Directed by: Seenu Ramasamy
- Written by: Seenu Ramasamy
- Produced by: Yuvan Shankar Raja; Shan Sutharasan
- Starring: Vijay Sethupathi; Gayathrie; Guru Somasundaram; Shaji Chen; Jewel Mary; Anikha Surendran
- Cinematography: M. Sukumar
- Edited by: Sreekar Prasad
- Music by: Ilaiyaraaja; Yuvan Shankar Raja
- Production company: YSR Films
- Distributed by: Studio 9 Productions
- Release date: 24 June 2022
- Running time: 124 minutes
- Country: India
- Language: Tamil

Maamanithan (transl. The Great Human) is a 2022 Indian Tamil-language drama film written and directed by Seenu Ramasamy and produced by Yuvan Shankar Raja under his YSR Films banner. The film stars Vijay Sethupathi, Gayathrie, Guru Somasundaram, K. P. A. C. Lalitha, Anikha Surendran, Jewel Mary, and Shaji Chen. In addition, Yuvan composed the soundtrack of this film along with his father Ilaiyaraaja. The cinematography and editing were handled by M. Sukumar and A. Sreekar Prasad. The film was theatrically released on 24 June 2022 after being delayed for five years.

== Plot ==
The film begins with Radhakrishnan hiding from the police, who are visiting the area. He then runs through the village and into the fields. Then, we see a flashback of Krishna's life and the events leading to him running.

Past: Krishna is a humble auto driver who is sincere and honest. He is content with his life, which revolves around the auto, his wife Savithri, and his two kids. Krishna has a good friend, Vappa Bhai. His kids study in a government school, and he wishes to improve their standard of education by admitting them to a private school. He teaches his kids good morals.

He also reveals to his daughter how he fell in love with Savithri. One day, a man left some gold jewellery in his automobile, and Krishna helped return it. The old man's name was Maarisaamy. Krishna and Bhai visit his house and give him the jewellery. Maarisaamy reveals that he brought the jewellery for his daughter's engagement ceremony. After that, one day, Krishna meets Savithri at a bus stand. He learns they cancelled the alliance due to concerns about dowry.

Krishna, Mayilu (a house broker), and Bhai help Savithri and her father find a new home. At the same time, Krishna falls in love with Savithri. Krishna helps him find four suitable grooms. He smartly puts his horoscope with them and gives it to Maarisaamy. Krishna then tells Bhai that they accepted him as a suitable groom. So Bhai shows Maarisaamy Krishna's newly built house and tells him that Krishna wanted to marry an educated girl. Bhai persuades Maarisaamy that Krishna will care for Savithri dearly. Eventually, Maarisaamy decides to accept the engagement. Finally, after many hurdles, Krishna and Savithri get married at the temple, which concludes the love flashback.

One day, when taking his kids to school, he sees builders working on a plot of land. A man tells Krishna that a Malayali man brought a piece of land and informs him that he knows the town, and if Krishnan helps him sell, he can get the commission he needs to improve his children's education standards. To do so, he promises real estate businessman Madhavan that he will assist him in selling all the plots to his villagers. Eventually, he becomes a house broker, but Savithri convinces him it's not a good choice. Soon, Krishna sells all the properties, and Madhavan collects all the money. Krishnan gets drunk with Madhavan, and Savithri gets angry. The following day, Madhavan cheats Krishnan by running away with the money. Krishna becomes confused since he feels guilty that his villagers trusted his word. Madhavan's good-hearted assistant tells him that Madhavan's house is in Kerala. It returns to the film's beginning.

Present: Krishna travels to Kerala to meet Madhavan's mother, but he is not there. He works as a toilet cleaner and befriends two workers who help him. At home, Savithri realises that the house documents are gone, and the villagers become hostile to them and insult Krishna. Bhai provides support for them and gives them money and food. Krishna helps Philomy's daughter, Christy (whom he sees as his daughter). He earns the trust of Philomy. Eventually, Krishna's kids grow up, and Savithri decides to pay off Bhai using his son's salary. He reveals that his dad came to him the night he eloped and gave the house documents to Bhai. Bhai informs them that Krishna is the one who sent money for their studies. Savithri, Krishna's son, and Bhai visit Kerala. According to Krishna's friends, he left the town shortly after Madhavan's mother died, and they discovered his objective.

Eventually, in Varanasi, Krishna stays with two priests. They are suspicious of him, and he tells them his children should win in the village where he lost and is seeking forgiveness. The priest says that Krishna is a Maamanithan. One day, he sees Madhavan, who is now a beggar. Madhavan begs for Krishna's forgiveness, but Krishna tells him that he left his mother orphaned, and she died. Madhavan commits suicide by drowning, and it breaks Krishna's heart. Eventually, the priest helps Savithri and his son reunite with him, and they go to see his daughter.

== Cast ==
- Vijay Sethupathi as Radhakrishnan (Krishna)
- Gayathrie as Savithri, Radhakrishnan's wife
- Guru Somasundaram as Vappa Bhai (Ismail), Radhakrishnan's best friend
- K. P. A. C. Lalitha as Madhavan's mother
- Shaji Chen as Real Estate Madhavan
- Jewel Mary as Teashop Philomy
- Anikha Surendran as Christy, Philomy's Daughter
- Ragu Aditya as Savithri's brother
- Manikandan R. Achari as Mani, Radhakrishnan's friend in Kerala
- Ganja Karuppu as House broker
- Manasvi Kottachi as Nithya, Radhakrishnan's daughter (young age)
- Saravana Sakthi as Radhakrishnan's friend in Kerala
- A. Govindamoorthy as house owner
- Kalabhavan Mani as a photo in Mani's room

== Production ==
=== Development ===
In April 2017, reports surfaced that Vijay Sethupathi had signed a new project with Seenu Ramasamy after the success of Dharma Durai (2016). Seenu Ramasamy started writing the script for the project with a tentative title Maamanithan, with Yuvan Shankar Raja who earlier collaborated with Seenu in Dharma Durai and the unreleased film Idam Porul Yaeval, expressed his interest in producing the film apart from working on the film's music. Later, Seenu also narrated the script to composer Ilaiyaraaja who also agreed to work with his son Yuvan.

It was further reported that the film biopic of a popular leader who hails from the south Tamil Nadu region, with Vijay Sethupathi playing a politician in the film, however the team denied such claims. Seenu Ramasamy finished working on the script in May 2017, but the shooting of the film was delayed due to Sethupathi's commitments in other films.

=== Casting ===
Samuthirakani was announced as a pivotal character in April 2018, who plays a straightforward villager in the film. Seenu Ramasamy revealed that "his character will be the silent type, with very little dialogue and there will be no pair for him in the film". Though the film marked Samuthirakani and Seenu collaborating after Neerparavai (2012), the former did not confirm his presence in the film. During the start of the shoot, Guru Somasundaram was announced a part of the pivotal cast, with Seenu stating his character as an important one which appears throughout the film. Guru Somasundaram played the role of a Muslim in the film.

Seenu also cast Gayathrie playing another pivotal character. He stated that "her role is that of a young woman who has finished her 10th standard and has taken up teaching typewriting". Other supporting casts include K. P. A. C. Lalitha, Shaji Chen, Jewel Mary.

Manasvi Kottachi was cast as Sethupathi's daughter. Anikha was cast in a supporting role. During the schedule of Kerala, stills featuring Vijay Sethupathi and Malayalam actor Manikandan Achari went viral through internet, with the latter reported to play a supporting role in the film. Vijay Sethupathi plays an auto driver hailing from a rural family in the film.

=== Filming ===
The film's shooting began in Madurai with a formal pooja (prayer ceremony) on 15 December 2018. The first schedule of the film began in Andipatti, near Madurai which took place for 20 days. On 23 January 2019, the team headed to Kerala to shoot few major sequences for the film. The Kerala schedule was completed in 13 days and the team shot few more sequences in Varanasi during early February and was wrapped on 12 February 2019. The entire filming was completed in 37 days.

== Music ==
The film marked the first collaboration of Ilaiyaraaja and his son Yuvan Shankar Raja working together and the final song recorded by his daughter and playback singer Bhavatharini before her death to cancer. Ilaiyaraaja's inclusion in the project was announced on 25 January 2018, when he was felicitated with Padma Vibushan by the Government of India, Yuvan stated that the collaboration with his father and brother, made his "journey of a music director being meaningful and purposeful". The film's director Seenu Ramasamy also thanked Yuvan for his initiative in bringing the Raja family collaborate on a project, in his interview with The Times of India.

Recording for the film's soundtrack began during September 2019, and completed in May 2020. The album featuring five songs had lyrics written by Pa. Vijay and Palani Bharathi. Ilaiyaraaja took charge of recording the songs and film score, while Yuvan made the arrangements for the soundtrack. The first single track "Thattiputta" was released by U1 Records on 7 April 2021, which had vocals performed by Ilaiyaraaja and written by Pa. Vijay. Another song "Ye Rasa" was released on 28 May 2021, which also had a promotional video featuring Yuvan Shankar Raja.

Track listing
No.	Title	Lyrics	Singer(s)	Length
1.	"Thattiputta"	Pa. Vijay	Ilaiyaraaja	3:28
2.	"Ye Rasa"	Pa. Vijay	Yuvan Shankar Raja	4:04
3.	"Pannapurathu"	Pa. Vijay	Raja Bhavatharini, Sriram Parthasarathy	3:30
4.	"Enna Nadakkudhu"	Karunakaran	Muthu Sirpi	2:51
Total length:				13:53

== Release ==
=== Theatrical ===
The film was reportedly scheduled for a theatrical release during September and October 2019, but was delayed indefinitely due to a lawsuit filed against the producers by Jayaseelan who earlier registered the same title for his film. In March 2021, Seenu Ramasamy tweeted that Yuvan Shankar Raja had acquired the title rights from Jayaseelan and further stated that the promotions will begin for the film under the title Maamanithan. The producers reportedly started negotiating with streaming platforms for a direct-to-streaming release, as theatres were shut down due to the COVID-19 pandemic. LetsOTT revealed that the film is scheduled for a digital release through either ZEE5 or Amazon Prime Video, although no official confirmation was made by the producers. The film was theatrically released on 24 June 2022.

=== Distribution ===
Both the Tamil Nadu and the Kerala distribution rights of the film have been bagged by R. K. Suresh under the banner Studio 9 Productions.

=== Home media ===
The digital rights of the film has been acquired by Aha Tamil, where it began streaming from 15 July 2022.

== Reception ==
Srivatsan S of The Hindu after reviewing the film wrote "Maamanithan is that script where both Sethupathi and Gayathrie do more for the film than what it does to them." Karthik Keramalu of Firstpost stated "Maamanithan is surprisingly honest. It doesn’t beat around the bush and tells a nice story straight from the heart." M Suganth of The Times of India gave 3.0 out of 5 stars and stated "in these times when big-screen entertainment has largely come to mean action thrillers and fantasies, Maamanithan — a character-driven drama – does feel like the last of its species. And by the time that it ends, it turns into something more — a saga that is quietly affecting."

Manoj Kumar R of The Indian Express rated 3 out of 5 stars stating that "Maamanithan is Seenu Ramasamy's meditation on life. And according to him, the man who knows to be content living on less is great." Sudhir Srinivasan of Cinema Express gave 3.5 out of 5 stars stating that "Noble intentions fail to make up for the lack of novelty and entertainment in this Seenu Ramasamy directorial".

Janani K of India Today gave the film 2.5 out of 5 and stated "Overall, Maamanithan is a moving drama with its heart in the right place." Soundarya Athimuthu of The Quint stated that "Maamanithan has its heart at the right place for it instills hope in human relationships, explaining while there may be one or two who will cheat or hurt you, there will be dozens waiting to support and embrace you with love." Hariharan Krishnan of Film Companion wrote "Despite the presence of an amazing actor like Vijay Sethupathi, who is able to navigate many of his films on his shoulders, this film seems to be losing its way, and that's largely because it lacks a central dramatic focus."
