= Kanne Kalaimaane =

2019 film by Seenu Ramasamy

- Theatrical release poster
- Directed by: Seenu Ramasamy
- Written by: Seenu Ramasamy
- Produced by: Udhayanidhi Stalin
- Starring: Udhayanidhi Stalin; Tamannaah Bhatia
- Cinematography: Jalandhar Vasan
- Edited by: Kasi Viswanathan
- Music by: Yuvan Shankar Raja
- Production company: Red Giant Movies
- Distributed by: Red Giant Movies
- Release date: 22 February 2019
- Running time: 126 minutes
- Country: India
- Language: Tamil

Kanne Kalaimaane (transl. My Dear Gorgeous!) is a 2019 Indian Tamil-language romantic drama film written and directed by Seenu Ramasamy, and produced by Udhayanidhi Stalin of Red Giant Movies. The film stars Udhayanidhi and Tamannaah Bhatia. Filming took place between January and March 2018. The music was composed by Yuvan Shankar Raja, cinematography was handled by Jalandhar Vasan and editing by Kasi Viswanathan. The film was released on 22 February 2019. The film received mixed reviews from critics.

== Plot ==
Kamalakannan, an agriculture graduate doing organic farming, meets with the newly appointed bank manager Bharathi regarding unpaid bank loans. She later learns about him helping the poor villagers by obtaining loans for them and comes to appreciate him. The romance opens to a wedding after a meeting between both families. Kannan's father Ramasamy and grandmother Appatha are sceptical about Bharathi's integration into their simple rural family as an educated, well-employed woman. Ramasamy arranges for the couple to live in a separate house to avoid problems between Appatha and Bharathi, as she does not approve of Bharathi continuing her work after marriage.

Suddenly, Bharathi loses her vision, and Kannan takes her to the hospital, where it is diagnosed that the blindness is hereditary and there is no treatment available to cure it (Bharathi's mother also lost her vision a few years back). Bharathi feels bad and requests Kannan not to inform his family, as they might develop even more hatred towards her. Kannan tries hard to get Bharathi cured by taking her to different hospitals. He borrows money from a local moneylender to meet Bharathi's medical expenses. As Kannan is unable to repay, the moneylender hits him in front of everyone, which shocks Kannan's father and grandmother. Appatha gets furious and repays Kannan's debt to the moneylender. She visits Kannan's home and finds the truth about Bharathi's situation. Appatha feels sad for Bharathi and takes her to her home. Kannan, upon knowing this, feels happy that Bharathi is accepted by his family. Bharathi is also happy with the care shown by Appatha. Kannan receives a phone call from the doctor referring Bharathi to meet a doctor in Delhi who seems to be able to cure her blindness. The movie ends with Kannan and Bharathi travelling to Delhi.

== Cast ==
- Udhayanidhi Stalin as Kamalakannan
- Tamannaah Bhatia as Bharathi
- Vadivukkarasi as Kannan's grandmother
- Vasundhara Kashyap as Muthulakshmi, Kannan's classmate
- Poo Ram as Ramasamy, Kannan's father
- Shaji Chen as Bank Manager
- Ambani Shankar as Kannan's friend
- Saravana Sakthi as Karuppu, Kannan's friend
- Theepetti Ganesan as Kannan's friend
- Vinayak Raj as Kannan's friend
- Chandran Pachamuthu as Chandran, Muthulakshmi's husband
- Vetri Kumaran as Asst. Manager Vetri Kumaran
- V. R. Nagendran as Nagendran
- Devipriya as Kannan's mother
- Aathmaarthi as Aathmaarthi
- Thavasi as Saamy

== Production ==
In December 2017, Udhayanidhi Stalin of Red Giant Movies announced he would be starring in a film to be directed by Seenu Ramasamy. Tamannaah Bhatia who was the lead actress of the director's Dharma Durai (2016) was again hired for this film. The film's title was revealed to be Kanne Kalaimaane, after a song from the 1982 film Moondram Pirai (1982). Jalandhar Vasan was signed to be the cinematographer, and Kasi Viswanathan for editing. Filming started in January 2018 in Madurai. The film shoot finished in 45 days in a single schedule on 14 March 2018.

== Soundtrack ==
The soundtrack was composed by Yuvan Shankar Raja. The first single "Endhan Kangalai" was released on 24 December 2018.

All lyrics are written by Vairamuthu.

Track listing
No.	Title	Music	Singer(s)	Length
1.	"Azhaikkatuma"	Mathichiyam Bala	Mathichiyam Bala	05:01
2.	"Neenda Malare"	Yuvan Shankar Raja	Shweta Pandit, Yazin Nizar	04:02
3.	"Endhan Kangalai"	Yuvan Shankar Raja	Yuvan Shankar Raja, Sooraj Santhosh	03:34
4.	"Sevvandhi Poove"	Yuvan Shankar Raja	Karthik, Pragathi Guruprasad	04:00
5.	"Vaa Vellai Raasathi"	Yuvan Shankar Raja	Yuvan Shankar Raja	05:02
Total length:				21:39

== Critical reception ==
Anjana Shekar of The News Minute gave 3 out of 5 stars and wrote "An interesting drama with a few quibbles". Srinivasa Ramanujam of The Hindu wrote "A well-intentioned, well-performed drama that tries discussing more issues than it ought to" and praised the performances of the cast but criticised the screenplay. The Times of India gave 3 out of 5 stars and wrote "Kanne Kalaimaane feels like an amiable drama about genial characters". Vishal Menon of Film Companion wrote, "Like previous Seenu Ramasamy films, this too has a lot, in fact too much to say. If only he had developed a moving enough way to say it". Ashameera Aiyappan of The New Indian Express wrote, "It isn't that the director has given us a bad story, or characters, for that matter; it is the way this story is narrated".
