= Aruldoss =

Indian actor

- Born: Madurai, Tamil Nadu, India
- Occupations: Actor, cinematographer
- Years active: 1997–present

Aruldoss is an Indian actor known for his supporting roles in predominantly Tamil language films. Prior to focusing on an acting career, he worked as a cinematographer on several films.

== Career ==
After completing school, Aruldoss worked as a photographer at weddings. Through his acquaintances, he managed to get a breakthrough into the Tamil film industry and served as an assistant cinematographer in Sundar C's Arunachalam (1997). He subsequently went on to work as the main cameraman in A Aa E Ee (2009) and Pathinaaru (2009).

Aruldoss has often collaborated as an actor with film maker Suseenthiran, after making his debut in Naan Mahaan Alla (2010) and appearing in Azhagarsamiyin Kuthirai (2011), Rajapattai (2011) and Paayum Puli (2015). His close friendship with Seenu Ramasamy has meant that Aruldoss has also played roles in Thenmerku Paruvakaatru (2010), Neerparavai (2012), Idam Porul Yaeval (2015) and Dharma Durai (2016). During the making of Ponmaalai Pozhudhu (2013), Aruldoss slapped the actress Gayathrie by mistake. He subsequently made a public apology for his actions.

He has also appeared in acclaimed films including Soodhu Kavvum (2013), Thanga Meengal (2013) and Papanasam (2015).

The actor is equally proud of having shared screen space with Rajinikanth in Kaala (2018). He also played with Mammootty in Peranbu (2019).

He continued with Suseenthiran's Eeswaran (2021), Veerapandiyapuram (2022) and Kuttram Kuttrame (2022). He was later acted in Vikram (2022) starring Kamal Haasan as well as Maharaja (2024), Viduthalai Part 2 (2024) and Thalaivan Thalaivii (2025) with Vijay Sethupathi.

== Filmography ==
=== Films ===
Year	Film	Role	Notes
2001	Shahjahan	Bhoopathi's friend	Uncredited
2002	Naina	Man who scolds Aavudaiyappan	Uncredited
2005	Raam	News reporter	Uncredited
2010	Naan Mahaan Alla	Kutti Nadesan	
2010	Thenmerku Paruvakaatru	Mokkaiyan	
2011	Azhagarsamiyin Kuthirai	Rajaram	
2011	Rajapattai		
2011	Pathinaaru		
2012	Thadaiyara Thaakka	Sekhar	
2012	Neerparavai	Fisherman	
2013	Soodhu Kavvum	Rowdy Doctor	
2013	Ponmaalai Pozhudhu	Divya's Father	
2013	Thanga Meengal	Evita's husband	
2013	Thagaraaru		
2014	Oru Kanniyum Moonu Kalavaanikalum		
2014	Vadacurry	Sathish's brother	
2014	Arima Nambi	Thug leader	
2014	Salim	Police officer	
2014	Vilaasam	Bawa	
2014	Thirudan Police	Councilor	Guest appearance
2015	Idam Porul Yaeval		Unreleased
2015	Papanasam	Suresh Babu	
2015	Thakka Thakka	Bala	
2015	Paayum Puli		Guest appearance
2015	Vellaiya Irukiravan Poi Solla Maatan	Rajagopal	
2016	Marudhu	Rolex Pandiyan's henchmen	
2016	Dharma Durai	Beemaraasu	
2016	Atti	Radha	
2017	Sathriyan	Shankar	
2017	Pandigai	Suresh	
2017	Ivan Yarendru Therikiratha	Bombay Boys member	
2017	Oru Kanavu Pola		
2017	Katha Nayagan	Doss	
2017	Aayirathil Iruvar	Mandhiramoorthy	
2017	Nenjil Thunivirundhal	Gang leader	Simultaneously shot in Telugu
2017	Velaikaran	Ansari	
2018	Sketch	Dorai	
2018	Nimir	Politician	
2018	Koottali		
2018	Vikadakumaran	ACP Paul Raj	Malayalam film
2018	Kaathiruppor Pattiyal	Williams	
2018	Kaala	Mani	
2018	Enga Kattula Mazhai	Agni Eshwaran	
2018	Marainthirunthu Paarkum Marmam Enna		
2019	Maanik	Goon	
2019	Peranbu	Amudhavan's friend	
2019	Oviyavai Vitta Yaru		
2019	Sindhubaadh	Venba's uncle	
2019	Children's Park	Murugan	Malayalam film
2019	Raatchasi	Politician	
2019	Vennila Kabaddi Kuzhu 2	Doss	
2019	Magamuni	Guru Narayanan	
2021	Eeswaran	Aadhinarayanan	
2021	Pulikkuthi Pandi	DSP	
2021	Chakra	Leela's father	Cameo appearance
2021	Thaen		
2022	Kombu Vatcha Singamda		
2022	Veerapandiyapuram	Anbu	
2022	Kuttram Kuttrame		
2022	Ayngaran	Intellectual Property Officer	
2022	Vikram	Rudra Prathap	
2022	Viruman	Paalpandi	
2023	Bommai Nayagi	Senthil	
2023	Raavana Kottam		
2023	Appatha	Azhagu Sundaram	
2023	Saandrithazh		
2023	800		
2023	Tamil Kudimagan	Esakki	
2023	Naadu		
2024	Glassmates		
2024	Maharaja	Sub-inspector R. K. Perumalsamy	
2024	Pogumidam Vegu Thooramillai	Pazhakkadai Sekar	
2024	Saala	Guna	
2024	Soodhu Kavvum 2	Rowdy Doctor	
2024	Viduthalai Part 2		
2024	Rajakili	Sengundran, ACP	
2025	Vanangaan	Bar owner	
2025	Gangers	Kottaiyarasan	
2025	Peranbum Perungobamum		
2025	Paramasivan Fathima	Veera Shiva Sambasivan	
2025	Padai Thalaivan		
2025	Love Marriage	Ram's maternal uncle	
2025	Thalaivan Thalaivii	Inspector Parivendhan	
2025	Thandakaaranyam		
2025	Marutham		
2025	Mask	Advocate	Cameo appearance
2025	BP 180		
2025	Mark	Murali	Kannada film
2026	Thaai Kizhavi	Vijayan	
2026	Anthony	Baskaran	
2026	Nooru Saami		
2026	Con City	Gopi	
2026	Arulvaan		

=== Cinematographer ===
Year	Title	Notes
2009	A Aa E Ee	
2011	Pathinaaru	

=== Web series ===
Year	Title	Role	Platform	Notes
2019	D7		ZEE5	
2021	November Story	Inspector Sudalai	Hotstar original	
2025	Nadu Center		JioHotstar	

=== Dubbing Artist ===
Year	Title	Notes
2014	Pannaiyarum Padminiyum	Voice dubbed for Mahadevan
2023	Japan	Voice dubbed for Sunil
