= Shaji Chen =

Indian writer and actor

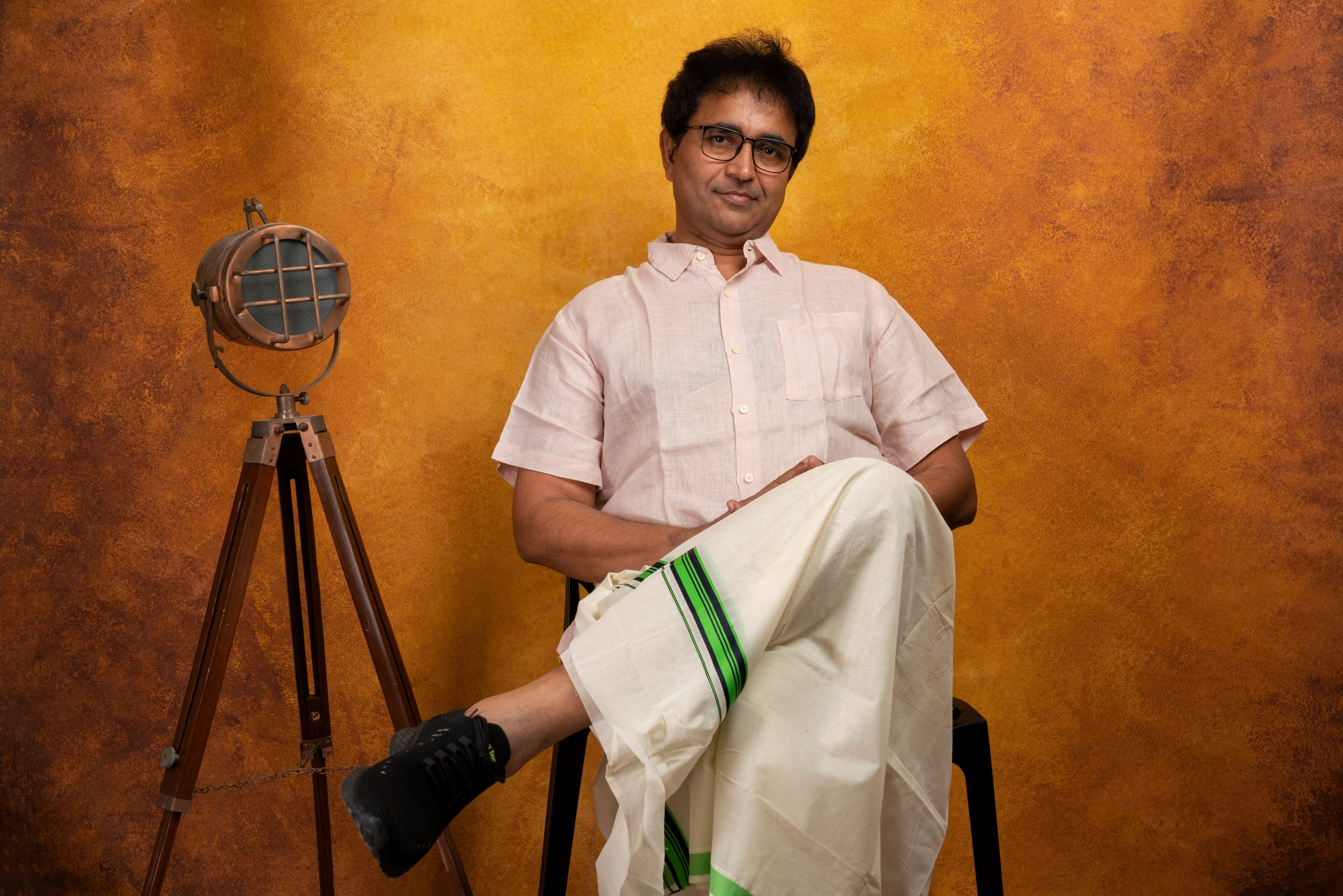
- Born: Kattappana, Idukki, Kerala, India
- Occupations: Writer, actor

Shaji Chen (also credited as Shaji and Shaji Chennai) is an Indian writer and actor. Shaji's main area of writing is music and cinema related. Shaji writes in Tamil, Malayalam, and English languages, and acts in Tamil, Telugu and Malayalam films.

== Writing career ==
As a writer he is known for his music and film related write-ups and autobiographical articles. His various articles have been published in The Hindu, Times of India, India Today, AV Max, Ananda Vikatan, The Hindu Tamil, Uyirmmai, Kalachuvadu, Theeranadhi, Vikatan Thadam, Kaalam, Kumkumam, Puthiya Thalaimurai, Sunday Indian, Andhimazhai, Padachurul, Bhashaposhini, Mathrubhumi Azhchappathippu, Madhyamam Weekly, Chandrika Weekly, Kalakaumudi, Malayalam Vaarika, Mangalam Daily, Mangalam Annual, Deepika Daily and others.

His articles in the series Music Beyond Words were translated to Tamil by Tamil writer Jeyamohan as Sollil Adangaatha Isai. Published in the Tamil literary magazine Uyirmmai, this was a popular column in the Tamil serious literature. Another Tamil writer S. Ramakrishnan has also translated many of Shaji's articles to Tamil. After the first few years of these translations, Shaji started writing directly in Tamil. In 2016 a complete collection of his music-related articles was published by Vikatan Publications. In the 2023 Chennai Book Fair an updated and improved collection of his music-related articles published by Discovery Books. Director Mani Ratnam, Director Mysskin, Director Vasanth, Director Seenu Ramasamy, Director Vasanthabalan and Actor composer G. V. Prakash Kumar introduced and endorsed the book.

His column named Paattinappuram (Beyond the Song), was published in the Malayalam weekly Chandrika. His first Book in Malayalam, 'Paattalla Sangeetham', was released by Malayalam publisher Green Books. Many of his Malayalam articles are published in the notable literary magazine of Malayalam, Bhashaposhini and his article series named Cinema Bhraanthinte Naalpathu Varshangal (40 Years of Cinema Craze) was published therein for one year in 2017–18. Portions from this series were also published as shorter chapters in Malayala Manorama Online. In 2019 October, Matrubhumi Books published this series as a book and it went on to be a best seller in the first week of the publication itself.

As a music critic, Shaji appeared in national dailies such as Times of India, The Hindu, Deccan Chronicle, New Indian Express, and others. His monthly column in Tamil 'Cinema Veriyin 40 Aandukal'' was published in Vikatan Thadam Magazine. The last 2 chapters of the same were published in Andhimazhai Magazine. His columns in Tamil, Mullarumbu Marangal in Andhimazhai monthly and Isaiyezhuthu in Uyirmai monthly are well known. In Malayalam, the web magazine Truecopythink published most of his writings from 2020 to 2024.

Shaji has also worked in the advertising industry for many years providing storylines, scripts, jingle lyrics, and translations and he also acted in some advertisements. He has written many advertisement films and ad campaigns. He worked for brands such as South Indian Bank, Muthoot Fincorp, Nippo

=== Bibliography ===
Title	Language
Sollil Adangaatha Isai (Music Beyond Words)	Tamil
Isaiyin Thanimai (The Music of Solitude)	Tamil
Isaiyin Oliyil (In The Light of Music)	Tamil
Isai Thirai Vaazhkai (Music, Movies and Life)	Tamil
Shaji Isai Katturaikal Muzhuththokuppu (Shaji Writings on Music Complete Collection)	Tamil
Paattalla Sangeetham (Music is not Mere Songs)	Malayalam
Cinema Praanthinte 40 Varshangal (40 Years of Cinema Craze)	Malayalam
Cinema VeRiyin 40 Aandugal (40 Years of Cinema Craze)	Tamil
Thirumbi Paarkaiyil (When I Look Back)	Tamil
Shaji Isai Katturaikal Muzhuththokuppu (Improved Edition)	Tamil

== Filmography ==
Year	Title	Role	Language	Notes
2013	Onaayum Aattukkuttiyum	CBCID Lal	Tamil	
2014	Maan Karate	Peter's boxing coach	Tamil	
2015	Aaranyam	Inspector Duraipandi	Tamil	
2017	Aby	Javed	Malayalam	
2017	Thupparivaalan	ACP Vijayakumar	Tamil	
2017	Spyder	IB Head Matthews	Telugu; Tamil	
2018	Savarakathi	Madman	Tamil	Cameo appearance
2019	Kanne Kalaimaane	Bank Manager	Tamil	
2019	Iruttu	Muslim Sage	Tamil	
2020	Psycho	Dagini's father	Tamil	
2021	Doctor	Metro Driver Daniel D'Souza	Tamil	Cameo appearance
2022	Beast	Central Home Minister	Tamil	
2022	Maamanithan	Real Estate Madhavan	Tamil	
2022	Cobra	Commissioner Gilbert Rosario	Tamil	
2023	Raavana Kottam	Ramnad District Collector	Tamil	
2024	Thalaimai Seyalagam	Political broker Krishnamurti	Tamil	Web series
2024	Hit List	North Indian Businessman	Tamil	
2024	Vettaiyan	Chennai Police Commissioner Virendar	Tamil	
2024	Devil	Church Father (Cameo)	Tamil	
2025	Blackmail	C I Kannan	Tamil	
2026	Con City	MLA Senthil	Tamil	Cameo appearance

== Voluntary Work ==
Shaji Chen is the Trustee in South India for the Salil Chowdhury Foundation of Music formed in the name of the notable composer of Indian popular music. He also represents Ritwik Ghatak Memorial Trust in South India. He has also been the Judge of Sujatha Ilakkiya Viruthu, a Tamil literary award instituted in the name of the Tamil writer Sujatha. Shaji Chen is an advocate of informal education for children and the rights of special children. He is also a supporter of sustainable nature farming and native food culture.

== Personal life ==
Shaji Chen was born in Kattappana, Idukki District, Kerala. He lives in Chennai with his wife and daughter.
