= Kasi Viswanathan =

Indian film editor (born 1968)

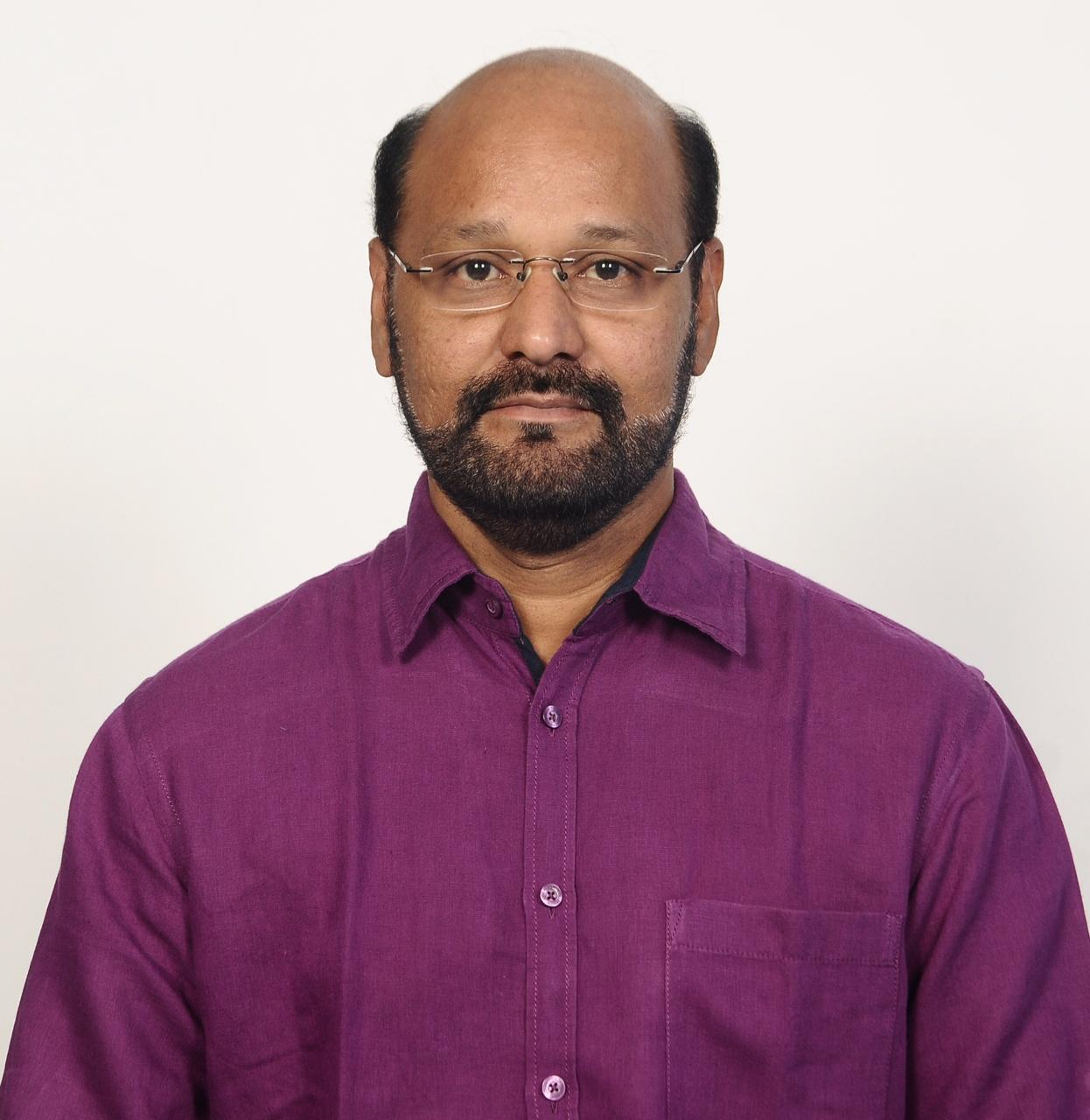
- Born: 28 January 1968 (age 58)
- Occupation: Film editor
- Years active: 2001–present

Mu. Kasi Viswanathan (born 28 January 1968) is an Indian film editor, who has worked on predominantly Tamil-language films.

== Career ==
Kasi Viswanathan made his debut as an editor with Kamal Haasan's Aalavandhan (2001), experimenting with techniques involving animation and motion capture cameras, and then worked in the romantic comedy, Pammal K. Sambandam (2002). His work on his first film won him the Tamil Nadu State Film Award for Best Editor in the year 2004, for the year 2001. Kasivishwanthan subsequently went on to collaborate as an editor in several of Prakash Raj's productions with Duet Movies. Under the banner he worked in movies like Mozhi and Abhiyum Naanum. He has since regularly collaborated with directors including Radha Mohan, Suseenthiran, Seenu Ramasamy, Sundar C, Mysskin and Siva's Veeram.

== Filmography ==
- Aalavandhan (2001)
- Abhay (2001) (Hindi)
- Pammal K. Sambandam (2002)
- Punnagai Poove (2003)
- Raja Narasimha (2003) (Kannada)
- Naam (2003)
- Nee Mattum (2004)
- Vaanam Vasappadum (2004)
- Ponniyin Selvan (2005)
- Azhagiya Theeye (2005)
- Chinna (2005)
- Chithiram Pesuthadi (2006)
- Poi (2006)
- Thalai Nagaram (2006)
- Mozhi (2007)
- Veerappu (2007)
- Kovai Brothers (2007)
- Rendu (2007)
- Velli Thirai (2008)
- Aayudham Seivom (2008)
- Abhiyum Naanum (2008)
- Panchamirtham (2008)
- Vennila Kabadi Kuzhu (2009)
- Vannathupoochi (2009)
- Ainthaam Padai (2009)
- Naan Mahaan Alla (2010)
- Thaa (2010)
- Kattradhu Kalavu (2010)
- Thenmerku Paruvakaatru (2010)
- Magizhchi (2010)
- Panjamirtham (2010)
- Arumugam (2010)
- Kullanari Koottam (2011)
- Azhagarsamiyin Kuthirai (2011)
- Rajapattai (2011)
- Krishnaveni Panjaalai (2012)
- Neerparavai (2012)
- Veeram (2014)
- Thirumanam Enum Nikkah (2014)
- Kaadu (2014)
- Sivappu (2015)
- Dharma Durai (2016; also actor)
- Maaveeran Kittu (2016; also actor)
- Nenjil Thunivirundhal (2017)
- C/O Surya (2017) (Telugu)
- Aan Devathai (2018)
- Merku Thodarchi Malai (2018)
- Kanne Kalaimaane (2019)
- Nedunalvaadai (2019)
- 100% Kadhal (2019)
- Kasada Thapara (2021) - Streaming release; "Arampatra" segment
- Endraavathu Oru Naal (2021)
- Veerapandiyapuram (2022)
- Kuttram Kuttrame (2022)
- Karottiyin Kadhali (2022)
- Bumper (2023)
- Malai (2023)
- Aalakaalam (2024)
- Aalan (2024)
- Parundhu (2026)
- Pagaivanuku Arulvai (TBA)
- Idam Porul Eval (TBA)
