= Saranya Ponvannan =

Indian actress

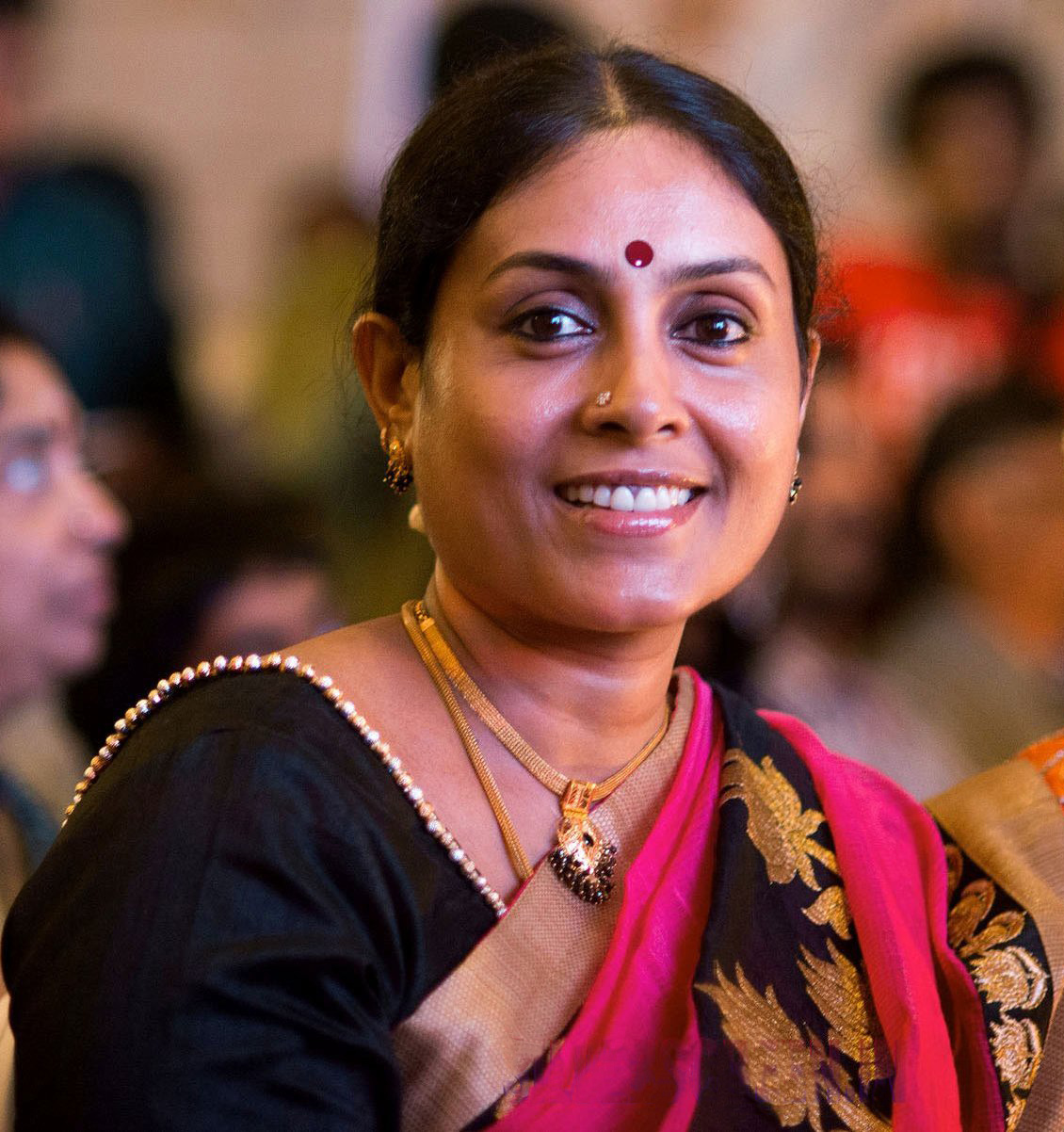
- Saranya at Saivam Audio Launch
- Born: Sheela Christina; Chennai, Tamil Nadu
- Occupation: Actress
- Years active: 1987–1996 (films); 2000 (television); 2003–present (films)
- Spouse: Ponvannan (m. 1995)
- Children: 2
- Parent: A. B. Raj (Father)

Saranya Ponvannan (born Sheela Christina) is an Indian actress who predominantly appears in Tamil, Telugu, and Malayalam and a few Kannada language films. She also acted in one Hindi movie Chup: Revenge of the Artist in 2022. Saranya made her acting debut in a lead role in Mani Ratnam's Nayakan (1987) and went on to play lead roles from 1987 to 1996. Following an eight-year sabbatical, she returned to films in 2003 as a character actor roles. In her career spanning around over 25 years she had won a number of accolades including one National Film Award, two Tamil Nadu State Film Awards and five Filmfare Award South.

== Career ==
Saranya made her Tamil debut in Mani Ratnam's production Nayakan, as the female lead opposite Kamal Haasan in 1987. She made her first Telugu appearance in 1989 film Neerajanam; her Malayalam debut was in the same year with the film Artham starring opposite Mammootty.

In 1996, she made her Kannada debut with Appaji. After 1996, she quit from acting. In 2000 she appeared playing the lead role in the comedy television series, Veettukku Veedu Lootty, and subsequently accepted some supporting roles in other projects. During 2006 she appeared in family-drama serial Mugangal, which aired on Sun TV.

After a break from films she made a comeback in 2003 Tamil film Alai opposite Raghuvaran as Silambarasan 's mother. Since then she has been noted for her "mother" roles in films most notably Raam, Thavamai Thavamirundhu and Em Magan in the mid-2000s.

Her performance as Veerayi, a widowed mother torn between love and possessiveness, in the 2010 film Thenmerku Paruvakaatru – her 100th release – earned her the National Film Award for Best Actress. Her major breakthrough was 2005 Tamil film Thavamai Thavamirundhu after which she established herself as a prominent and leading actress in South India. As of 2017, she was one of the highest paid character actresses in the south Indian film industry.

In 2014, she launched Design & School of Fashion Technology (DSOFT), a fashion institute at Virugamakkam, Chennai.

She has also played the role of villain in Achamindri (2016).

In 2017, she had only three releases. She starred in the sequel of 2014 Tamil film Velaiyilla Pattathari, reprising the role of Bhuvana, in a cameo appearance. The character had died in the original film, but the filmmakers wanted her to appear in the sequel, because of her part in the former's success. Her second venture was with Vishnu Vishal in the film Katha Nayagan, playing the mother of Vishnu Vishal. Later she starred in Magalir Mattum, a women-centric film, in which she played alongside Jyothika, Oorvasi and Bhanupriya.

In 2018, she was first seen in comedy-family drama Mannar Vagaiyara as Vemal's mother; her comedy timing was well received, however Itly was released and opened to negative reviews. Later she was seen in Vijay Sethupathi's Junga and Nayanthara's Kolamavu Kokila as the mother of Kokila who although affected by lung cancer, assists her daughter in smuggling cocaine.

She took on the role of Vishalavva, mother to Kiccha Sudeepa's character in Kannada movie The Villain directed by Prem in 2018. Later she was seen in Madhupal's Malayalam thriller drama Oru Kuprasidha Payyan playing Chembammal.

She signed to reprise the role of Lakshmi in Kalavani 2. Her first Telugu release of the year was Gang Leader where she played the lead role Varalakshmi alongside Nani, Lakshmi, Kartikeya Gummakonda, Priyanka Arul Mohan among others.

After a brief hiatus because of COVID-19 Pandemic, her first release was through OTT in 2021 was Bhoomi alongside Jayam Ravi. Critics cited that the talented actress was restricted to few insignificant scenes. Following Bhoomi, she had two other releases in 2021 - multistarer Telugu film Maha Samudharam and Sasikumar's MGR Magan.

== Personal life ==
Saranya was born in a Christian family in Chennai. She is the daughter of Malayalam film director A. B. Raj, who had directed over 75 films. Her family is from Alappuzha, Kerala. She married actor-director Ponvannan in 1995, who co-starred with her in Karuthamma (1994), and the couple has two daughters.

== Awards ==
National Film Awards

- 2011—Best Actress for Thenmerku Paruvakaatru

Tamil Nadu State Film Awards

- 2006 – Best Supporting Actress for Em Magan
- 2010 – Best Supporting Actress for Kalavani

Filmfare Awards

Winnings:

- 2005 – Winner—Best Supporting Actress for Thavamai Thavamirundhu
- 2006 – Winner—Best Supporting Actress for Em Magan
- 2011 – Winner—Best Supporting Actress for Thenmerku Paruvakaatru
- 2012 – Winner—Best Supporting Actress for Neerparavai
- 2019 - Winner- Best Supporting Actress for Kolamavu Kokila

Nominations:

- 2005 - Nominated- Best Supporting Actress - Tamil for Raam
- 2012 - Nominated- Best Supporting Actress - Tamil for Oru Kal Oru Kannadi
- 2010 – Nominated—Filmfare Award for Best Supporting Actress - Telugu for Puli
- 2014 – Nominated–Best Supporting Actress - Tamil for Velaiyilla Pattathari
- 2016 – Nominated–Best Supporting Actress - Tamil for Kodi

South Indian International Movie Awards

- 2013 – Winner—Best Actress in a Supporting Role for Neerparavai
- 2014 – Nominated–Best Actress in a Supporting Role for Kutti Puli
- 2015 – Winner—Best Actress in a Supporting Role for Velaiyilla Pattathari
- 2019 – Nominated–Best Actress in a Supporting Role for Kolamavu Kokila

Ananda Vikatan Awards

- 2010 – Winner–Best Supporting Actress for Kalavani
- 2014 – Winner–Best Supporting Actress for Ennamo Nadakkudhu & Velaiyilla Pattathari

Vijay Awards

- 2011 – Winner—Best Supporting Actress for Thenmerku Paruvakaatru
- 2013 - Nominated—Best Supporting Actress for Oru Kal Oru Kannadi
- 2015 – Nominated–Best Supporting Actress for Velaiyilla Pattathari

Norway Tamil Film Festival Awards

- 2011 - Winner-Best Supporting Actress for Thenmerku Paruvakaatru
- 2013 - Winner-Best Supporting Actress for Oru Kal Oru Kannadi
- 2014 - Nominated-Best Supporting Actress forVelaiyilla Pattathari

Edison Awards

- 2011 - Winner-Best Supporting Actress for Thenmerku Paruvakaatru

JFW Awards

- 2014 - Women Achiever of the year
- 2025 - Best On Screen Mother of Tamil Cinema

JFW Movie Awards

- 2019 - Best Supporting Actress for Kolamavu Kokila

== Filmography ==
=== Films ===
Year	Film	Role	Language	Notes
1987	Nayakan	Neela	Tamil	Debut film
1988	Manasukkul Mathappu	Dr.Geetha	Tamil	
1988	En Jeevan Paduthu	Narmada	Tamil	
1988	Melam Kottu Thaali Kattu	Muthamma	Tamil	
1988	Sivapputhaali	Keerthana	Tamil	
1988	Dhaayam Onnu	Preetha	Tamil	
1989	Andru Peytha Mazhaiyil	Preethi	Tamil	
1989	Sakalakala Sammandhi	Uma	Tamil	
1989	Karunguyil Kundram		Tamil	
1989	Neerajanam	Jaya	Telugu	Telugu Debut
1989	Artham	Manasa	Malayalam	Malayalam Debut
1990	Anjali	Dr. Sheela	Tamil	
1990	Ulagam Pirandhadhu Enakkaga	Meena	Tamil	
1991	Vanakkam Vathiyare	Sundari	Tamil	
1991	Naan Pudicha Mappillai	Lakshmi	Tamil	
1991	Ashwini		Telugu	
1991	Ganga		Telugu	
1991	Aakasha Kottayile Sultan	Mallika	Malayalam	
1991	Cheppukilukkana Changathi	Manikutty	Malayalam	
1991	Aanaval Mothiram	Annie	Malayalam	
1991	Ennum Nanmakal	Indu	Malayalam	
1992	Agni Paarvai	Seetha	Tamil	
1992	Kottai Vaasal	Rekha	Tamil	
1992	Sahasam	Rekha	Telugu	
1993	Dasarathan	Vasanthi	Tamil	
1993	Magrib	Aarifa	Malayalam	
1993	Journalist	Ranjini	Malayalam	
1993	Ente Sreekuttikku	Nandhini	Malayalam	
1993	Injakkadan Mathai & Sons	Beena	Malayalam	
1993	Aadarsam		Telugu	
1994	Dollar	Lusie	Malayalam	
1994	Karuththamma	Ponnatha	Tamil	
1994	Seevalaperi Pandi	Velammal	Tamil	
1995	Pasumpon	Malar	Tamil	
1996	Appaji	Rekha	Kannada	
1996	Meendum Savithri	Uma	Tamil	
1996	Neti Savithri		Telugu	
1996	Boss		Kannada	
1996	Easwaramoorthy IN	Lathika	Malayalam	
1996	Samayakkondu Sullu	Rukmini	Kannada	
2003	Alai	Nirmala	Tamil	Comeback film after marriage
2003	Chantigadu	Savthriyamma	Telugu	
2004	Varnajalam	Karthiga	Tamil	
2004	Arul	Arul 's sister	Tamil	
2004	Adhu	Meera's mother	Tamil	
2004	Chatrapathy	Saravanan's sister	Tamil	
2004	Ramakrishna	Ramakrishna's mother	Tamil	
2004	Meesai Madhavan	Devi	Tamil	
2004	Gomathi Nayagam		Tamil	
2005	Ayodhya	Jameela	Tamil	
2005	Raam	Saradha	Tamil	
2005	Sivakasi	Kayalvizhi	Tamil	
2005	Thavamai Thavamirundhu	Saradha Muthiah	Tamil	Filmfare Award for Best Supporting Actress – Tamil
2006	Emtan Magan	Selvi	Tamil	Filmfare Award for Best Supporting Actress – Tamil; Tamil Nadu State Film Best Supporting Actress Award
2006	Thiruvilaiyaadal Aarambam	Thiru's mother	Tamil	
2006	Rakhi	Gowri's Mother	Telugu	
2006	Adaikalam	Kasthuri	Tamil	
2007	Thirumagan	Jayakodi	Tamil	
2007	Jagadam	Seenu's mother	Telugu	
2007	Kireedam	Rajeshwari	Tamil	
2007	Pirappu	Kaliamman	Tamil	
2007	Vel	Saradha (Velu's & Vasu's Mother)	Tamil	
2007	Puli Varudhu	Ramesh's Mother	Tamil	
2008	Pidichirukku	Stella	Tamil	
2008	Nenjadhai Killadhe	Vasanth's false mother	Tamil	
2008	Singakutty	Kathir's mother	Tamil	
2008	Vilaiyattu		Tamil	
2008	Kuruvi	Devi's sister-in-law /Koccha's Wife	Tamil	
2008	Pandi	Sivagami	Tamil	
2008	Ready	Pooja's younger maternal aunt	Telugu	
2008	Thenavattu	Vazhuvanthal	Tamil	
2008	Dindigul Sarathy	Saradha	Tamil	
2008	Ini Varum Kaalam	Aravind's mother	Tamil	
2009	Yavarum Nalam	Shanti, Manohar's Mother	Tamil	
2009	Colours	Dr. Rajalakshmi	Malayalam	
2009	Vanam Partha Seemayile		Tamil	
2010	Police Quarters	Jayamma	Kannada	
2010	Bayam Ariyaan	Saraswathi	Tamil	
2010	Pulliman	Yashoda Panicker	Malayalam	
2010	Kalavani	Lakshmi Ramasamy	Tamil	Ananda Vikatan Awards for Best Supporting Actress; Tamil Nadu State Film Best Supporting Actress Award
2010	Guru Sishyan	Mahalakshmi	Tamil	
2010	Magane En Marumagane	Ponnarasi's Mother	Tamil	
2010	Thambikku Indha Ooru	Mrs.Kumaraswamy	Tamil	
2010	Vedam	Padma	Telugu	
2010	Puli	Puli's mother	Telugu	Nominated, Filmfare Award for Best Supporting Actress - Telugu
2010	Naane Ennul Illai	Janaki	Tamil	
2010	Yaksha	Yaksha's mother	Kannada	
2010	Thenmerku Paruvakaatru	Veerayi	Tamil	National Film Award for Best Actress; Vijay Award for Best Supporting Actress; Filmfare Award for Best Supporting Actress - Tamil; Norway Tamil Film Festival Award for Best Supporting Actress; Edison Award for Best Supporting Actress
2011	Muthukku Muthaaga	Pechi	Tamil	
2011	Vaanam	Lakshmi	Tamil	
2011	Sadhurangam	Analaar's wife	Tamil	
2011	Maharaja	Seetha	Tamil	
2012	Oru Kal Oru Kannadi	Shenbagam	Tamil	Norway Tamil Film Festival Award for Best Supporting Actress; Nominated, Filmfare Award for Best Supporting Actress - Tamil; Nominated, Vijay Award for Best Supporting Actress
2012	Chaarulatha	Chaaru & Latha's Mother	Tamil	
2012	Chaarulatha	Chaaru & Latha's Mother	Kannada	
2012	Thaandavam	Sivakumar's Mother	Tamil	
2012	Neerparavai	Mary	Tamil	Filmfare Award for Best Supporting Actress - Tamil; SIIMA for Best Actress in a Supporting Role
2013	Vatthikuchi	Sakthi's mother	Tamil	
2013	Kutti Puli	Deivanai	Tamil	Nominated, SIIMA for Best Actress in a Supporting Role
2013	All in All Azhagu Raja	Meenakshi	Tamil	
2013	Suvadugal		Tamil	
2014	Idhu Kathirvelan Kadhal	Yasothammal	Tamil	
2014	Naan Sigappu Manithan	Sumathi	Tamil	
2014	Ennamo Nadakkudhu	Vijay's mother	Tamil	Ananda Vikatan Awards for Best Supporting Actress
2014	Manam	Seetharamudu's mother	Telugu	
2014	Pappali		Tamil	
2014	Velaiyilla Pattathari	Bhuvana	Tamil	SIIMA for Best Supporting Actress Tamil; Ananda Vikatan Awards for Best Supporting Actress; Nominated, Filmfare Award for Best Supporting Actress - Tamil; Nominated, Vijay Award for Best Supporting Actress; Nominated, Norway Tamil Film Festival Award for Best Supporting Actress
2014	Amma Ammamma	Lakshmi	Tamil	
2016	Bangalore Naatkal	Kannan's mother	Tamil	
2016	24	Sathyabhama	Tamil	
2016	Brahmotsavam	Babu's Aunt	Telugu	
2016	Remo	SK's Mother	Tamil	
2016	Kodi	Kodi's & Anbu's mother	Tamil	Nominated, Filmfare Award for Best Supporting Actress - Tamil
2016	Achamindri	Rajalakhsmi	Tamil	
2017	Velaiyilla Pattathari 2	Bhuvana	Tamil	
2017	Katha Nayagan	Thambidurai's mother	Tamil	
2017	Magalir Mattum	Subbulakshmi Mangalamoorthy (Subbu)	Tamil	
2018	Mannar Vagaiyara	Kalaiyarasi	Tamil	
2018	Itly	Inba	Tamil	Lead role
2018	Junga	Junga's mother/ Don amma	Tamil	
2018	Marainthirunthu Paarkum Marmam Enna	Japan's mother	Tamil	
2018	Kolamavu Kokila	Kokila's mother	Tamil	Filmfare Award for Best Supporting Actress – Tamil Nominated - SIIMA for Best Supporting Actress Tamil
2018	The Villain	Vishalavva	Kannada	
2018	Oru Kuprasidha Payyan	Chembakaamal	Malayalam	
2019	Kalavani 2	Lakshmi	Tamil	
2019	Gang Leader	Varalakshmi	Telugu	
2021	Bhoomi	Bhoominathan's mother	Tamil	
2021	Maha Samudhram	Arjun's mother	Telugu	
2021	MGR Magan	Rasathi	Tamil	
2022	Etharkkum Thunindhavan	Kosalai	Tamil	
2022	Viruman	Muthulakshmi	Tamil	
2022	Chup: Revenge of the Artist	Nila's Mother	Hindi	(Bollywood cinema) debut
2022	Varalaru Mukkiyam	Malar	Tamil	
2022	Aruvaa Sanda	Valli	Tamil	
2023	Kushi	Rajalakshmi	Telugu	
2023	Conjuring Kannapan	Lakshmi	Tamil	
2024	Mazhai Pidikkatha Manithan	Rathnam, Burma’s mother	Tamil	
2024	Brother	Hemamalini Sivagurunathan	Tamil	
2025	Nilavuku En Mel Ennadi Kobam	Ponni	Tamil	
2025	Bun Butter Jam	Lalitha	Tamil	
2025	Padaiyaanda Maaveeraa	Kalyani	Tamil	
2025	Bha. Bha. Ba.	Vavamani	Malayalam	
2025	Gangster Granny †	TBA	Tamil	Filming

=== As playback singer ===
Year	Film	Song	Language	Composer	Note
2014	Ennamo Nadakkudhu	"Meesa Kokku"	Tamil	Premgi Amaren	Debut as Singer
2017	Magalir Mattum	"Time Passukkosaram"	Tamil	Ghibran	Also lead actor

=== Television ===
Year	Television series	Channel	Notes
1991	Penn	DD Podhigai	Episode 7 (Lead)
1992	Ninaivu Kurippugal	DD Podhigai	Host
2000-2003	Veetuku Veedu Looty	Jaya TV	Meena (Lead role) 183 Episodes
2006-2007	Mugangal	Sun TV	Lead role 177 Episodes
2022	Amudhavum Annalakshmiyum	Zee Tamil	Herself (for promotion in promo); Along with Sneha, Sangeetha
2022	Maari	Zee Tamil	Herself (for promotion in promo); Along with Sneha, Sangeetha
2022	Meenakshi Ponnungaa	Zee Tamil	Herself (for promotion in promo); Along with Sneha, Sangeetha
2024	Nayanthara: Beyond the Fairytale	Netflix	Herself
