= Aaranyam =

2015 Tamil film by Guberji

- Official poster
- Directed by: Guberji
- Starring: Ram; Neeraja
- Cinematography: Salai Sagadevan
- Music by: S. R. Ram
- Production company: Aaha Oho Productions
- Release date: 20 November 2015
- Country: India
- Language: Tamil

Aaranyam (transl. Jungle) is a 2015 Indian Tamil-language romantic drama film directed by Guberji and starring Ram and Neeraja.

== Cast ==
- Ram as Arvind
- Neeraja as Divya
- Shaji Chen as Inspector Duraipandi
- Ilavarasu as Kumaresan
- Singamuthu as Forest Guard
- Crane Manohar as Forest Guard
- Theni Murugan
- Theepetti Ganesan

== Music ==
The music for the film was composed by S. R. Ram.

Track listing
No.	Title	Lyrics	Singer(s)	Length
1.	"Kadhal Maayavalai"	Meenakshi Sundaram	Vishnu, Radhika Natarajan	4:09
2.	"Maranji Kedandha"	Meenakshi Sundaram	A. R. Thomas, Radhika Natarajan	3:52
3.	"Jimkhan"	Ekadasi	Anthony Daasan, S. R. Ram, A. R. Thomas, Pavan Karthik, Velan Sagadevan	4:27
4.	"Kannula Unna"	Meenakshi Sundaram	Gopi, Sameera Baradwaj	4:04
5.	"Siragai Madithu"	Meenakshi Sundaram	Radhika Natarajan	0:37
6.	"Azhagaga Tholainthen"	Meenakshi Sundaram	Radhika Natarajan, Amrutha	1:09
7.	"Jimkhan Dubstep"	Ekadasi	Anthony Daasan, Rap Immanuel	3:00
8.	"Aaranyam (Instrumental)"	—	—	3:39
Total length:				24:57

== Reception ==
Nandita Ravi of The Times of India wrote that "With no script whatsoever, lack-luster performances from the cast, juvenile jokes, music with absolutely no recall value, and really bad dialogues, you’d think this film had at least one saving grace to boast of. Sadly, there is none". Sudhir Srinivasan of The Hindu criticised the film as a whole and called the storyline "dated, dreadful and predictable". Malini Mannath of The New Indian Express opined that "Though a laudable first-time effort, the unnecessary humour and an abrupt ending overshadow the better moments of the film". A critic from Dinamalar gave the film a negative review while praising the cinematography. SMK of Nowrunning said that "Apart from few middling performances, there is nothing to root for in Aaranyam, which is a terribly cliched film-making with overflowing banalities and caricatured characters".
