= Anthony (film) =

2026 Indian Tamil language film

- Theatrical release poster
- Directed by: Sukirthan Christhuraja; Jenosan Rajeswar
- Produced by: Kalaivalari Saga Ramanathas; Suganthini; Vicky
- Starring: Kayal Vincent; TJ Bhanu; Sudharshan Raveendran
- Cinematography: Rishi Selvam
- Edited by: Suresh A Prasad
- Music by: Ilaiyaraaja
- Production companies: Osai Films; Kanaa Productions
- Release date: 13 March 2026
- Country: Sri Lanka
- Language: Tamil

Anthony is a 2026 Sri Lankan Tamil-language drama film directed by Sukirthan Christhuraja and Jenosan Rajeswar. It stars Kayal Vincent, TJ Bhanu, and Sudharshan Raveendran.

== Cast ==
- Kayal Vincent as Anthony
- TJ Bhanu as Nalini
- Sudharshan Raveendran as Ashok
- Saumi Munasin as Karolin
- Ashana Julius Kanistan as Vaanila
- Aruldoss as Baskaran
- Nizhalgal Ravi as Rev. Church Father
- Kalaivalarai Saga Ramanathas as Sammadi

== Production ==
The film is produced by Kalaivalari Saga Ramanathas and Suganthini, with Sriskandaraja, Vijay Balasingam, and Vicky serving as co-producers. Cinematography is handled by Rishi Selvam, while editing is done by Suresh A Prasad. The music and lyrics are composed by Ilaiyaraaja.

== Release ==
The film was released on 13 March 2026.

== Reception ==
Sreejith Mullappilly of Cinema Express wrote, "The makers put in a sincere attempt to mine poignancy out of this material, but the result turns out to be rather pitiful", though the cast performances, especially of Kayal Vincent and TJ Bhanu were the only redeeming factors. Hindu Tamil Thisai gave the film a more positive review, praising its depiction of the effects of war on the lives of ordinary people.
