= Aalakaalam =

2024 Indian Tamil-language drama film

- Theatrical release poster
- Directed by: Jaya Krishnamoorthy
- Written by: Jaya Krishnamoorthy
- Produced by: Jaya Krishnamoorthy
- Starring: Easwari Rao; Jaya Krishnamoorthy
- Cinematography: Ka. Sathyaraj
- Edited by: Mu. Kasi Viswanathan
- Music by: N. R. Raghunanthan
- Production company: Shree Jai Productions
- Distributed by: Action Reaction Jenish
- Release date: 5 April 2024
- Country: India
- Language: Tamil

Aalakaalam (transl. Deadly poison) is a 2024 Indian Tamil-language social drama film written and directed by Jaya Krishnamoorthy, who starred in the film with Easwari Rao and produced it under the banner of Shree Jai Productions.

== Cast ==
- Easwari Rao as Yasodha
- Jaya Krishnamoorthy as Jai
- Chandini Tamilarasan as Thamizh
- Tigergarden Thangadurai as Velu
- Deepa Shankar as Karpagam
- Baba Bhaskar
- Rajesh

== Production ==
The film marks directorial debut of Jaya Krishnamoorthy.

== Reception ==
Manigandan KR of Times Now rated 2.5 out of 5 star and noted that "The film has a powerful message to deliver but it is completely devoid of entertainment". Maalai Malar critic wrote that Easwari Rao's performance as the hero's mother is a major strength of the film and added that the climax scene is dazzling. Virakesari critic appreciated the director for setting the climax scene differently and felt that in that scene, Easwari Rao gives a good performance and captivates the hearts of the fans.
