= White Rose (2024 film) =

- Theatrical release poster
- Directed by: K Rajashekar
- Written by: K Rajashekar
- Produced by: N Ranjani
- Starring: Anandhi; Rk Suresh
- Cinematography: V Elayaraja
- Edited by: Gopikrishna
- Music by: Sudharshan
- Production company: Poombarai Murugan Productions
- Distributed by: Uthraa Productions
- Release date: 5 April 2024
- Country: India
- Language: Tamil

White Rose is 2024 Indian Tamil-language thriller film written and directed by K Rajashekar. The film stars Anandhi and R. K. Suresh .The film was produced by N Ranjani under the banner of Poombarai Murugan Productions.

== Plot ==
A young woman is brutally murdered, with the killer cutting off her pinky before dismembering her body. As several similar murders have occurred recently, the police suspect that a serial killer is responsible.

Divya is a housewife who lives happily with her husband and young daughter. One night, while returning home from a restaurant with her family, their motorcycle accidentally enters an area where police and terrorists are engaged in a firefight. Divya's husband is accidentally shot and killed by the police. To avoid accountability for his death, the police falsely label him a terrorist. As a result, Divya receives no compensation, while the damage to her husband's reputation prevents her from finding employment. After struggling for several months to support herself and her daughter, Divya reaches her breaking point and decides to become a prostitute.

At her first customer's house, Divya, still emotionally unprepared to sell herself, tries to calm down in the bathroom. There, she discovers a human finger. Terrified, Divya locks herself inside and calls the police. Police officer Vetrimaran responds to the call and suspects that her customer may be the serial killer they have been searching for. Vetrimaran is the officer who accidentally shot Divya's husband, and his guilt over the incident has made him particularly devoted to solving the case. He instructs Divya to protect herself while he heads to the house.

The customer breaks through the bathroom door and attacks Divya. During the struggle, he knocks her unconscious. Realizing that she has contacted the police, he locks her inside the house and escapes. Vetrimaran eventually spots the customer on the street and pursues him. After being cornered, the man fights Vetrimaran, injuring both of them. Vetrimaran ultimately overpowers him, and both men are taken to a hospital for treatment.

At the hospital, a nurse identifies the suspect as Dilip, her former classmate from medical college. She reveals that Dilip was suspended after being caught having sex with a corpse in the college mortuary. A doctor concludes that Dilip has necrophilia, further strengthening the police's belief that he is the serial killer.

Meanwhile, Divya escapes from Dilip's house and seeks help at a nearby shop. She contacts the police and waits there. Dilip subsequently escapes from the hospital. By coincidence, he enters the same shop to purchase something and discovers that Divya is hiding there. He attacks the shopkeepers while trying to reach her, allowing Divya to escape. Dilip pursues her through the streets as the police follow in an attempt to intervene.

After a prolonged chase, Vetrimaran catches up with Dilip, who attempts to fight him. With Divya's assistance, Vetrimaran kills Dilip.

In the final scene, it is revealed that Vetrimaran, seeking to atone for his role in Divya's husband's death, has funded Divya's training at a police academy so that she can become a police officer and support her daughter.

== Cast ==
- Anandhi as Divya
- R. K. Suresh as Dilip
- Rooso Sreedharan as Acp Vetrimaran
- Vijith as Asraf
- Baby Nakshatra as Diya
- Sasi Laya as Inspector Rekha
- Suliyan Bharani as Young Dilip
- Rittika Chakraborthy as Swathi
- Hashin as Anjali
- Dharani Reddy as Kavya
- S. R. Jangid as Commissioner of Police

== Production ==
The film began production in 2022 in Chennai and is the directorial debut of K Rajashekar.

== Release ==
White Rose got theatrically released on 5 April 2024 and will begin streaming on Aha Tamil from 27 December 2024.

== Reception ==
Jayabhuvaneshwari B of Cinema Express noted that "Anandhi delivers a powerful performance, effortlessly embodying a worried mother and a terrified young woman".Times Now wrote that "In all, White Rose comes across as a film that is interesting."
