= Vijay Special Jury Award =

Indian film award

The Vijay Special Jury Award is given by the Indian TV channel Star Vijay as part of its annual Vijay Awards ceremony for Tamil (Kollywood) films. The award is given to both actors and films.

== Actors ==
Year	Actor	Film	Category
2013	Vijay Sethupathi	Soodhu Kavvum	Best Actor
2012	Vijay Sethupathi	Naduvula Konjam Pakkatha Kaanom	Best Actor
2011	Sara Arjun	Deiva Thirumagal	Best Child Actor

== Films ==
Year	Film
2014	Madras
2013	Soodhu Kavvum
2012	Aarohanam
2010	Thenmerku Paruvakaatru

== See also ==
- Tamil cinema
- Cinema of India
