= R. K. Suresh =

Indian film producer and actor

R.K. Suresh
- Occupations: Film producer; Actor
- Years active: 2011–present
- Spouse: Madhu (m. 2020)
- Children: 1

R. K. Suresh is an Indian film producer and actor in Tamil cinema, who heads the production company, Studio 9. In 2015, Suresh debuted as an actor, working in Bala's Tharai Thappattai and M. Muthaiah's Marudhu. He is currently the deputy general secretary of Indiaya Jannayaka Katchi.

== Personal life ==
Suresh was married to his college friend for several years and both have one son. They had some issues and divorced. He was engaged to be married to serial actress Divya Ganesh who acted in Sumangali. He had also said that Divya hailed from his hometown Ramanathapuram and that he really liked her. However the marriage was called off due to differences.

Suresh confirmed that he married Madhu, a cinema financier from Chennai in a secret wedding ceremony. The couple has a daughter.

A police complaint was lodged against Suresh in June 2021 alleging that he had cheated a family of ₹1 crore as commission after Suresh promised that he would help arrange ₹10 crore loan as he knew a bank manager. The complainant alleged Suresh used fraudulent documents to receive the ₹1 crore commission and refused to give back the money and threatened to murder the two sons in their family. The complainant said that her husband died due to depression due to the money loss and that since Suresh was a BJP leader, the police did not take his complaint seriously. Suresh said it was a fabricated story.

== Early life ==
Suresh was born in a Ramanathapuram family.

== Career ==
Suresh, the son of Dr R Kalanjiam — the producer of the Murali-starrer Poo Vaasam (1999), wanted to be a part of the film industry after being told he had the looks of an actor by director Samuthirakani at a gymnasium. He subsequently began looking for acting opportunities and approached several producers to no avail. He was offered a role as an extra in Pudhupettai (2006), but his father made him return the advance after being unimpressed about the stature of the role. Suresh then began a film distribution company and succeeded by distributing films such as Naduvula Konjam Pakkatha Kaanom (2012), Soodhu Kavvum (2013) and Idharkuthane Aasaipattai Balakumara (2013), before first working as a producer with Salim (2014).

In November 2014, Suresh was involved in a legal dispute with actor Vijay Sethupathi, who kept delaying the start of Suresh's production Vasantha Kumaran. He posted a message in social media that he quit the film industry and stated that Studio 9's ongoing projects would be shelved. Suresh blamed Vijay Sethupathi's failure to allot dates for Vasantha Kumaran as the primary reason behind their financial problems and sought legal action against the actor. The actor clarified that he had informed everything about the issue to the actors' association and was waiting for an official press release jointly from the producer and South Indian Film Artistes' Association. Responding to the allegations, in a statement, Vijay Sethupathi said that Suresh was trying to make the film without sorting out funding. He added that Suresh had indulged in several activities that were wrong and used a lot of bad languages, and refused to accept his withdrawal notice. The pair later amicably sorted out differences and announced another film during the following year, Dharma Durai (2016) which went on to be a profitable venture financially and critically.

Suresh later signed on to appear as an actor in Bala's Tharai Thappattai (2016), for which he received critical acclaim, and then in Muthiah's Marudhu (2016), portraying the antagonist. The success of the films prompted him to decide to star as a protagonist and announced several films as such as Thani Mugam, Billa Pandi, Vettai Naai and Vargam where he plays opposite Varalaxmi Sarathkumar, where he would portray the lead role. Also he has signed for a role in Vikram's Sketch (2017). In June 2017, he has signed a new project titled Thennattan, which is based on farmers and jallikattu and directed by M. Vijay Pandi. In the biopic film Traffic Ramasamy (2018), he is playing the friend of Veteran Director S. A. Chandrasekhar

== Political career ==
Suresh joined the Bharatiya Janata Party (BJP) on October 4, 2019. He was made Vice President of OBC wing of BJP in July 2020.

In a speech in October 2022, he expressed his desire to start a political organization for his caste. The Economic Offences Wing (EOW) of the Criminal Investigation Department (CID) Police recently issued a renewed summons to Suresh. This development followed suspicions of his connection to the ₹2,438 crores Aarudhra Gold Trading Company Private case. Presently, it is believed that Suresh is residing in Dubai.

== Filmography ==
=== As actor ===
- Note: all films are in Tamil, unless otherwise noted.

List of R. K. Suresh film credits as actor
Year	Film	Role	Notes
2016	Tharai Thappattai	Karuppaiah	
2016	Marudhu	Rolex Pandiyan	
2017	Hara Hara Mahadevaki	Inspector Suresh	
2017	Ippadai Vellum	ACP Dheena Sebastian	
2017	Palli Paruvathile	Kani's uncle	
2018	Sketch	Ravi	
2018	Shikkari Shambhu	Anitha's father	Malayalam film
2018	Kaali	Das	
2018	Traffic Ramasamy	Daniel	
2018	Billa Pandi	Billa Pandi	
2019	Madhura Raja	Circle Inspector David	Malayalam film
2019	Namma Veetu Pillai	Dharmar	
2020	Cochin Shadhi at Chennai 03	ACP Ameer Yousuf	Malayalam film
2021	Pulikkuthi Pandi	Saravedi	
2021	Vettai Naai	Sekhar	
2022	Visithiran	Maayan	
2022	Viruman	Soonapona	
2022	Pattathu Arasan	Kanniyan	
2023	Thugs	Doss	
2024	Kaaduvetty	Guru	
2024	White Rose	Dilip	
2025	Thalaivan Thalaivii	Porchselvan	
2025	Vattakhanal		

=== As producer ===
- Thambikottai (2011)
- Salim (2014)
- Dharma Durai (2016)
- Attu (2017)

=== As distributor ===
Under Studio 9 Productions throughout Tamil Nadu

- Saattai (2012)
- Heroine (Hindi) (2012)
- Aiyyaa (Hindi) (2012)
- Naduvula Konjam Pakkatha Kaanom (2012)
- Kozhi Koovuthu (2012)
- Masani (2013)
- Paradesi (2013)
- Soodhu Kavvum (2013)
- Thanga Meenkal (2013)
- Summa Nachunu Irukku (2013)
- 6 (2013)
- Idharkuthane Aasaipattai Balakumara (2013)
- Madha Yaanai Koottam (2013)
- Ninaithathu Yaaro (2014)
- Ettuthikkum Madhayaanai (2015)
- Chikkiku Chikkikkichu (2015)
- Kathiravanin Kodai Mazhai (2016)
- Maamanithan (2022)
- Liger (2022)
