= N. R. Raghunanthan =

- Born: 3 March 1980 (age 46); Chennai, Tamil Nadu, India
- Genres: Film score
- Occupations: Film composer, record producer, instrumentalist
- Years active: 2010–present

N. R. Raghunanthan is an Indian film score and soundtrack composer. He has scored music for Tamil films.

NR Raghunanthan debuted as a music director in 2010 with Thenmerku Paruvakaatru directed by Seenu Ramasamy which met with critical acclaim and went on to win three National Film Awards at the 58th National Film Awards. His second film was Krishnaveni Panjaalai (2012). Meanwhile, he had also composed SR Prabhakaran's Sundarapandiyan and Seenu Ramasamy's Neerparavai in the same year, while the former was a commercial success, the latter was critically well received. He also worked for music director G. V. Prakash Kumar's debutant productional movie Madha Yaanai Koottam.

== Discography ==
=== Film score and soundtracks ===
Year	Tamil	Other Languages	Notes
2010	Thenmerku Paruvakaatru		
2012	Krishnaveni Panjaalai		
2012	Sundarapandian		
2012	Neerparavai		
2013	Madha Yaanai Koottam		
2014	Pulivaal		
2014	Manjapai		
2015	Sivappu		
2015	Mapla Singam		
2015		Mr. Mommaga (Kannada)	Kannada remake of Manja Pai
2016	Adra Machan Visilu		
2016		The Devil Executioner; English film	
2017	Ivan Yarendru Therikiratha		
2017	Pichuva Kaththi		
2017	Kodi Veeran		
2018	Om		Film released under the title Meendum Oru Mariyadhai
2018	Kalavani Mappillai		
2020	Sinamkol		
2020	Utraan		
2021	Pulikkuthi Pandi		
2021	Nayae Peyae		
2021	Endraavathu Oru Naal		
2022		Nenu C/o Nuvvu (Telugu)	
2022	Karotiyin Kadhali		
2023	Om Vellimalai		
2023	Ayothi		
2023	Azhagiya Kanne		
2024	Yaavarum Vallavare		
2024	Aalakaalam		
2024	Pogumidam Vegu Thooramillai		
2024	Kozhipannai Chelladurai		
2025	Marutham		
2025	Lockdown		

=== Upcoming ===
Tamil	Other Languages	Notes
Pirandhal Parasakthi		
Idimuzhakkam		

=== Independent Music ===
- Tholadivaaram for DooPaaDoo.com with Chinmayi and Kabilan Vairamuthu

=== Television ===
- Abhiyum Naanum (Sun TV)
