= Sriram Parthasarathy =

Indian playback singer (born 1981)

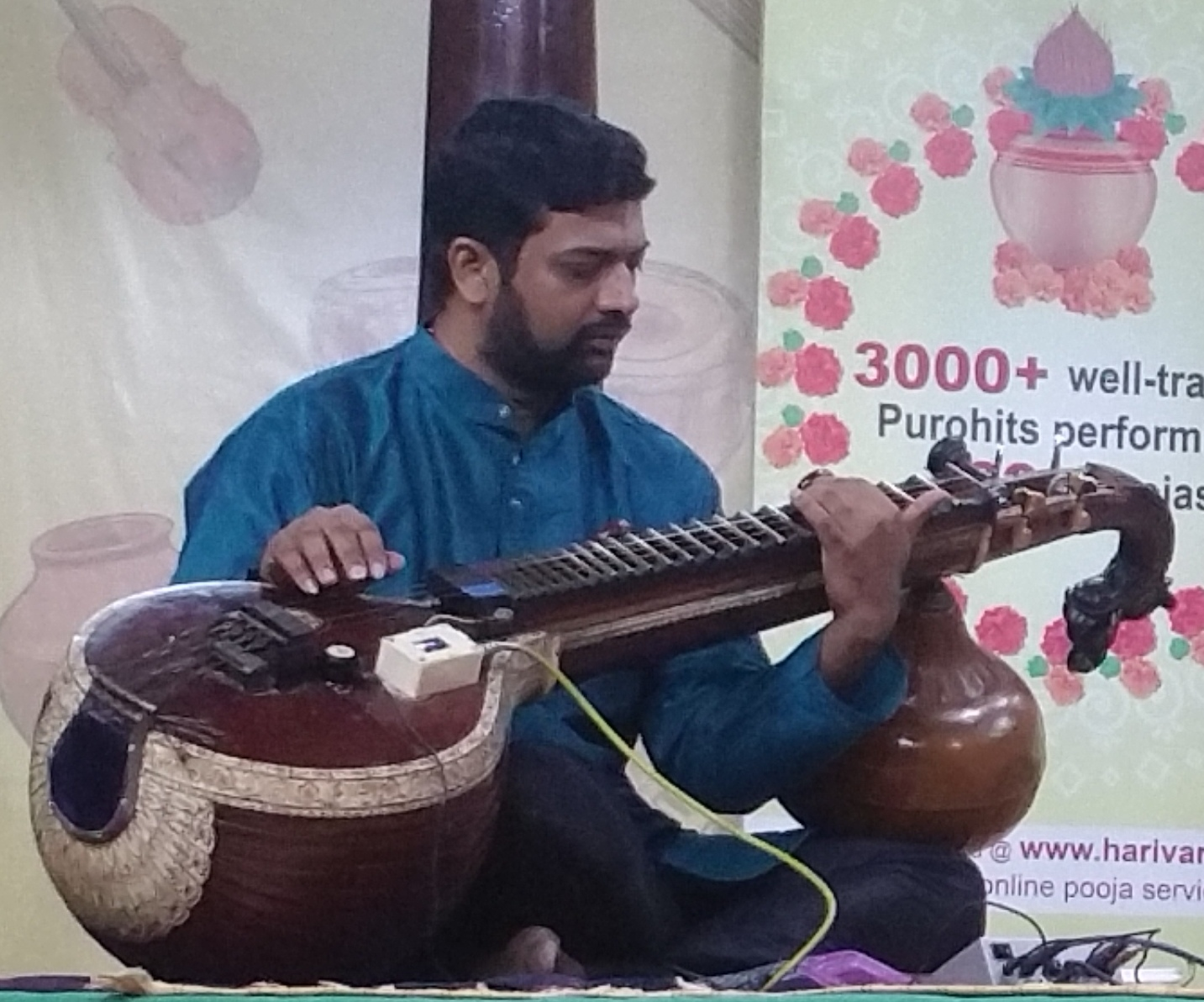

Background information
- Born: Sriram Parthasarathy; 9 May 1981 (age 45)
- Occupation: Playback singer
- Years active: 2001–present
- Spouse: Sruthi Sriram

Sriram Parthasarathy is a Carnatic vocalist and playback singer who predominantly works in Tamil, Telugu, and Malayalam films.

== Early life ==
Sriram Parthasarathy hails from a family of classical musicians. He is a disciple of Neyveli Santhanagopalan.

== Career ==
Sriram has recorded several singles and released them in the classical genre.

He has regularly collaborated with Ilaiyaraaja and Harris Jayaraj, while also working with other veteran music directors, such as A. R. Rahman, Yuvan Shankar Raja, and Vidyasagar. He has also won awards for his beautiful renditions.

Sriram's most famous songs include "Elangaathu Veesudhe" from Pithamagan (2003), "Suttum Vizhi" from Ghajini (2005), and "Aanandha Yaazhai" from Thanga Meengal (2013). He has won a Tamil Nadu Filmfare Award for "Suttum Vizhi", as well as SIIMA and Filmfare Awards for "Aanandha Yaazhai".

Sriram received appreciations for his rendition in 'Shades of Blue: A Musical Tribute to Venmurasu' sung along with Kamal Haasan, Saindhavi, Raleigh Rajan and is considered among his career best.

== Discography ==
Year	Film	Song	Music director	Language	Co-artist(s)
2001	Dhill	"Dhill Dhil"	Vidyasagar	Tamil	Ranjith, Timmy
2001	Poovellam Un Vasam	"Pudhu Malar Thottu"	Vidyasagar	Tamil	
2001	Parthale Paravasam	"Adhisaya Thirumanam"	A. R. Rahman	Tamil	Sujatha Mohan, Kalyani Menon, Sriram Narayan
2003	Parasuram	"Chittukuruvi"	A. R. Rahman	Tamil	Swarnalatha, Arjun Sarja
2003	Nala Damayanthi	"Thirumaangalyam"	Ramesh Vinayagam	Tamil	Sujatha Mohan, Saijanani
2003	Pithamagan	"Elangaathu Veesudhe"	Ilaiyaraaja	Tamil	Shreya Ghoshal
2003	Pithamagan	"Elangaathu Veesudhe" (Solo)	Ilaiyaraaja	Tamil	
2003	Nee Manasu Naaku Telusu	"Masthura Masthura"	A. R. Rahman	Telugu	Chitra Sivaraman, Mathangi Jagdish, George Peter
2004	Aai	"Neathi Adida"	Srikanth Deva	Tamil	Sadhana Sargam
2005	Ghajini	"Suttum Vizhi"	Harris Jayaraj	Tamil	Bombay Jayashree
2006	Aacharya	"Androru Thai"	Srikanth Deva	Tamil	
2006	Chennai Kadhal	"Thimirae Thimirae"	Joshua Sridhar	Tamil	Shweta Mohan
2007	Azhagiya Tamil Magan	"Kelamal Kayyilae"	A. R. Rahman	Tamil	Saindhavi
2008	Uliyin Osai	"Kaalathai Vendra"	Ilaiyaraaja	Tamil	
2008	Uliyin Osai	"Pularkindra Pozhuthu"	Ilaiyaraaja	Tamil	Ilaiyaraaja
2008	Uliyin Osai	"Kallai Irunthen"	Ilaiyaraaja	Tamil	Dhanya
2008	Uliyin Osai	"Ethanai Bhavam Undu"	Ilaiyaraaja	Tamil	
2008	Jayam Kondaan	"Adhai Koodavaa"	Vidyasagar	Tamil	
2008	Dhanam	"Unakkullae"	Ilaiyaraaja	Tamil	Bela Shende
2008	Dhanam	"Kannanukku Enna"	Ilaiyaraaja	Tamil	Bhavatharini, Prasanna
2008	Vaazhthugal	"Muzhumai Nila"	Yuvan Shankar Raja	Tamil	
2008	Nenu Meeku Telusa	"Emaindo Gaani Chusthu"	Achu Rajamani	Telugu	
2008	Yennai Theriyuma	"Vor Parvai Parthu"	Achu Rajamani	Tamil	
2009	Kannukulle	"Puthu Pournami"	Ilaiyaraaja	Tamil	Darshini Gopi
2010	Gaayam 2	"Andaala Lokam"	Ilaiyaraaja	Telugu	Geetha Madhuri
2010	Gaayam 2	"Endukamma Prema Prema"	Ilaiyaraaja	Telugu	Shashwathi
2011	Thambikottai	"Unakkaka Uyirey Vaythey"	D. Imman	Tamil	Shweta Mohan
2011	Ayyan	"Manasoram"	Ilaiyaraaja	Tamil	Sadhana Sargam
2011	Ponnar Shankar	"Kannai Padithen"	Ilaiyaraaja	Tamil	Shreya Ghoshal
2011	Ko	"Venpaniye"	Harris Jayaraj	Tamil	Bombay Jayashree
2011	Rangam	"Ee Manchullo"	Harris Jayaraj	Telugu	Bombay Jayashree
2011	Konjam Veyil Konjam Mazhai	"Usira Thirudi Pora"	Bharani	Tamil	
2011	Sri Rama Rajyam	"Sri Rama Lera"	Ilaiyaraaja	Telugu	Shreya Ghoshal
2011	Thandavakone	"Enna Pol Oruthan"	Ilaiyaraaja	Tamil	
2012	Maalai Pozhudhin Mayakathilaey	"Kadaal Karayile"	Achu Rajamani	Tamil	
2012	18 Vayasu	"Unnai Onru"	Charles Bosco & Dinesh Kanagaratnam	Tamil	
2012	Mayilu	"Thukkamenna Thuyaramenna"	Ilaiyaraaja	Tamil	Bhavatharini
2013	Thanga Meenkal	"Aanandha Yaazhai"	Yuvan Shankar Raja	Tamil	
2014	Persiakaran	"Njan Kanda Swapnathin"	Ranjith Meleppat	Malayalam	
2015	Anegan	"Deivangal Ingae"	Harris Jayaraj	Tamil	
2015	Anekudu	"Dheivamu Vundhi"	Harris Jayaraj	Telugu	
2015	Palakkattu Madhavan	"Santhoshame Endrum"	Srikanth Deva	Tamil	
2015	Sivappu	"Oru Ganam Vaanum"	N. R. Raghunanthan	Tamil	
2016	Sethupathi	"Konji Pesida Venam"	Nivas K. Prasanna	Tamil	K. S. Chithra
2016	Idhu Namma Aalu	"Oru Thalai Raagam"	Kuralarasan	Tamil	
2017	Koditta Idangalai Nirappuga	"Vaa Jannal"	C. Sathya	Tamil	
2017	Kaalakkoothu	"Engeyo Pogum"	Justin Prabhakaran	Tamil	
2018	Peranbu	"Vaanthooral"	Yuvan Shankar Raja	Tamil	
2018	Vada Chennai	"Kaarkuzhal Kadavaiye"	Santhosh Narayanan	Tamil	Santhosh Narayanan, Pradeep Kumar, Ananthu
2019	Sarvam Thaala Mayam	"Varalama"	A. R. Rahman	Tamil	
2019	Sarvam Thaala Mayam	"Dhari Jera Deevinchu"	A. R. Rahman	Telugu	
2021	Anbirkiniyal	"Anaikatti Aada Vandha"	Javed Riaz	Tamil	
2022	Valimai	"Enna Kurai"	Yuvan Shankar Raja	Tamil	Nandini Srikar
2024	Parachute	"Aagasa Usaram"	Yuvan Shankar Raja	Tamil	
Unreleased	Therodum Veedhiyile	"Maranthuvidu"	D. Imman	Tamil	
Unreleased	Ennathan Pesuvadho	"Tholaivil Irikkum Megam"	D. Imman	Tamil	
Unreleased	Idam Porul Yaeval	"Kondaatamae"	Yuvan Shankar Raja	Tamil	

== Awards ==
- Best Singer Award from the Music Academy
- Best Concert Award from the Music Academy
- Yuva Kala Jyothi from Nada Veda Mahothsavam Trust (Chennai)
- Tamil Nadu State Award from the Chief Minister Karunanidhi for the song Suttum Vizhi from Ghajini
- International Jury Award from ITFA group from Kuala Lumpur, Malaysia
- Saraswathi Sangeetha Seva Rathna from Saraswathi Sabha (Kumbakonam)
- Best Singer from The Lions Club
- Most Popular Cine Song Award from Shivaji Awards (Chennai)
- Best Singer from Radio Mirchi Hyderabad
- 2005 – Tamil Nadu State Film Award for Best Male Playback – "Suttum Vizhi" – Ghajini
- 2014 – 61st Filmfare Awards South for Best Male Playback – "Anandha Yaazhai" – Thanga Meenkal
- 2014– SIIMA Award for Best Male Playback Singer – "Aananda Yaazhai" – Thanga Meenkal
