= Neerparavai =

- Theatrical release poster
- Directed by: Seenu Ramasamy
- Written by: Dialogues: Seenu Ramasamy; B. Jeyamohan
- Screenplay by: Seenu Ramasamy
- Story by: Seenu Ramasamy
- Produced by: Udhayanidhi Stalin
- Starring: Vishnu Vishal; Sunaina; Nandita Das
- Cinematography: Balasubramaniem
- Edited by: Kasi Viswanathan
- Music by: N. R. Raghunanthan
- Production company: Red Giant Movies
- Distributed by: Red Giant Movies
- Release date: 30 November 2012
- Running time: 137 minutes
- Country: India
- Language: Tamil

Neerparavai (transl. Seabird) is a 2012 Indian Tamil-language drama film directed and co-written by Seenu Ramasamy, and produced by Udhayanidhi Stalin. It stars Vishnu Vishal and Sunaina, while Nandita Das plays the older version of the latter's character. Saranya Ponvannan, P. Samuthirakani, Varsha Ashwathi, and Anupama Kumar play supporting roles. The music is composed by N. R. Raghunanthan with cinematography by Balasubramaniem and editing by Kasi Viswanathan. The film was released on 30 November 2012. Saranya won the Filmfare Award for Best Supporting Actress – Tamil for her performance

== Plot ==
An old woman's son and daughter-in-law come to stay in her house in a coastal village, where she lives by herself. The son asks his mother to sell the house so he can build a house in the city with help from his father-in-law, but she refuses. The son and daughter-in-law notice that the woman often goes to the beach and prays in the garden every night. When they ask her why she goes to the beach, she says that she is waiting for her husband to come. The son gets angry and reminds her that she has been waiting for 25 years, and he is not going to come. While the mother goes to the beach, the couple digs the spot in the garden where she prays and finds a skeleton. They report this to the police. Inspector Agnes handles the case and begins interrogating the woman, who reveals her past.

Arulappasamy is a young man who is an alcoholic, a wastrel, and a constant embarrassment to his hardworking adopted parents. Esther is an orphaned girl who is adopted by a nun named Sister Benita, and she stays in the church. Arulappan slowly gets attracted to Esther, and his love for her changes him. He gives up drinking and wants to work so that he can marry Esther. However, the local fishermen do not allow him to go into the sea. Arulappan, because of his determination, buys a boat, marries his love Esther, and they have a son. Life is happy until fate intervenes. One day, Arulappan goes to fish, but after several days, he does not return. Esther is worried about him. They find his body in a boat and bring him home. Esther says to keep him in the house, and it was her fault because she is the one who sent him to work.

The film goes back to the present. In the court, when the judge asks the woman (an older Esther) why she accepted the blame for killing her husband, Esther says she was the one who urged him to go to work, leading to his death. The son later asks for forgiveness and says he will not ask for that house. Esther says she does not want the house as her husband is no longer there. The police releases Esther, and Agnes asks why she waits for her husband to come if she knows that he is dead. She says that only his body returned to shore, but his soul is still in the sea and believes that it will come to see her someday. After saying so, she rushes to the beach. The movie ends with her waiting at the beach day and night for her husband's soul.

== Cast ==
- Vishnu Vishal as Arulappasamy (credited as Vishnu)
- Sunaina as Esther
  - Nandita Das as older Esther
- Saranya Ponvannan as Mary
- Vadivukkarasi as Ebenezer
- P. Samuthirakani as Attha Uduman Gani
- Thambi Ramaiah as Joseph Bharathi
- Azhagam Perumal as Church Father
- Yogi Devaraj as Abraham
- Anupama Kumar as Sister Benita, Esther's adoptive mother
- Varsha Ashwathi as Inspector Agnes
- Aruldoss as Fisherman
- Pandi as Anthony
- Pasanga Sivakumar as Radhakrishnan
- Poo Ram as Lourdhusamy
- Imman Annachi as Annachi
- Manochitra as Annachi's sister
- Theepetti Ganesan
- Seenu Ramasamy as doctor (cameo appearance)

== Production ==
Seenu Ramasamy chose B. Jeyamohan to pen the dialogues for his film. The lead male role was initially supposed to be enacted by Vimal. Later, Vishnu took over as Vimal was unable to allot dates. It was produced by Udhayanidhi Stalin under the Red Giant Movies banner. Bindu Madhavi was signed up to portray the lead female role in January 2012. However, she was subsequently replaced by Sunaina. Nandita Das, who previously appeared in critically acclaimed Tamil films including Azhagi and Kannathil Muthamittal, was announced to be joining the team in April 2012. Furthermore, Saranya Ponvannan, who previously worked with the director in Thenmerku Paruvakaatru which fetched her the National Film Award for Best Actress, was signed for a supporting role.

Major portions of the film were shot in Kanyakumari and Manapad. Production was briefly delayed after Vishnu injured his arm while playing in the Celebrity Cricket League.

== Soundtrack ==
N. R. Raghunanthan composed the soundtrack. The lyrics were written by Vairamuthu. Raghunathan revealed that the song would have western classical, Latin, French Indian folk and Carnatic music influences. The audio was launched at Sathyam Cinemas on 10 October 2012. A few lines in "Para Para" created controversy among Tamil Christians, which led them to protest against the song; thus, the objected lyrics were changed.

Track listing
No.	Title	Singer(s)	Length
1.	"Meenuku"	Vijay Prakash, Harini	05:19
2.	"Para Para"	G. V. Prakash Kumar	05:19
3.	"Devan Magale"	V. V. Prasanna, Saindhavi	04:44
4.	"Raththa Kanneer"	Harish Raghavendra	04:06
5.	"Para Para" (Sad)	Chinmayi Sripada	05:19
6.	"Yaar Vettu"	Anand Aravindakshan	03:28
7.	"Para Para" (New)	Shreya Ghoshal	05:19
Total length:			33:34

== Release ==
Neerparavai was initially scheduled to release on 23 November 2012, but was pushed by a week to 30 November. Ahead of release, the film was denied entertainment tax exemption despite meeting the eligibility requirements, prompting the director to go on fast and he even approached the commissioner of Chennai Police for help. After Udhayanidhi approached the Madras High Court, tax exemption was granted.

=== Critical reception ===
Sify gave 4 stars with a "good" verdict and said the film was "a moving drama that will undoubtedly leave you with a lump in your throat. And films like this are hard to find." Malathi Rangarajan from The Hindu called the film as "soaring high" and said, "If meaningful cinema matters to you, go for it," by adding, "as a producer, Udhayanidhi Stalin can be proud of having backed a purposeful film, and as a creator, Seenu Ramasamy makes the water bird preen, and soar with confidence." Pavithra Srinivasan from Rediff.com gave 3 out of 5 with a "go watch" tag and said "[It] is a beautiful record of the lives of a community, their hopes and dreams, and the harsh reality of their lives."

IANS wrote, "Although the film is backed by deft screenplay, one would still find it hard to sit through the first half because the film meanders at snail's pace" but concluded that the film "is a fitting and beautiful saga of sea-folks, whose lives most often get sabotaged by reality". M Suganth of The Times of India wrote, "There is a lot to like in Neerparavai which seeks to highlight the issue of fishermen killings in the Palk Strait. But where the movie actually scores is not in the message it conveys, but in its handling of human relationships within an under-represented (on film and otherwise) community".

=== Accolades ===
Event	Category	Recipient	Verdict	Ref.
2nd South Indian International Movie Awards	Best Actress in a Supporting Role	Saranya Ponvannan	Won	
2nd South Indian International Movie Awards	Best Director	Seenu Ramasamy	Nominated	
2nd South Indian International Movie Awards	Best Cinematographer	Balasubramaniem	Nominated	
2nd South Indian International Movie Awards	Best Actor	Vishnu	Nominated	
2nd South Indian International Movie Awards	Best Actor in a Supporting Role	Poo Ramu	Nominated	
2nd South Indian International Movie Awards	Best Actress in a Supporting Role	Nandita Das	Nominated	
2nd South Indian International Movie Awards	Best Lyricist	Vairamuthu (for "Para Para")	Nominated	
2nd South Indian International Movie Awards	Best Male Playback Singer	G. V. Prakash Kumar for "Para Para"	Nominated	
Ananda Vikatan Cinema Awards	Best Male Character Artist	Poo Ramu	Won	
60th Filmfare Awards South	Best Film – Tamil	Neerparavai	Nominated	
60th Filmfare Awards South	Best Actress – Tamil	Sunaina	Nominated	
60th Filmfare Awards South	Best Supporting Actress – Tamil	Nandita Das	Nominated	
60th Filmfare Awards South	Best Supporting Actress – Tamil	Saranya Ponvannan	Won	
