= Dharma Durai (2016 film) =

2016 film by Seenu Ramasamy

- Poster
- Directed by: Seenu Ramasamy
- Written by: Seenu Ramasamy
- Produced by: R. K. Suresh
- Starring: Vijay Sethupathi; Tamannaah Bhatia; Aishwarya Rajesh; Srushti Dange
- Cinematography: M. Sukumar
- Edited by: Kasi Viswanathan
- Music by: Yuvan Shankar Raja
- Production company: Studio 9
- Release date: 19 August 2016
- Running time: 147 minutes
- Country: India
- Language: Tamil
- Budget: ₹13 crore
- Box office: est.₹26 crore

Dharma Durai is a 2016 Indian Tamil-language slice-of-life drama film directed by Seenu Ramasamy and produced by R. K. Suresh. The film stars Vijay Sethupathi in the lead alongside an ensemble cast consisting of Tamannaah Bhatia, Aishwarya Rajesh, Srushti Dange, Radhika Sarathkumar, Ganja Karuppu and Rajesh in pivotal roles. Yuvan Shankar Raja composed the music, while M. Sukumar and Kasi Viswanathan handled the cinematography and editing, respectively.

Dharma Durai was theatrically released worldwide on 19 August 2016. Garnering positive reviews, the film grossed approximately ₹26 crore at the box office, covering its budget of ₹13 crore. Along with other accolades, the film won a prize for Vairamuthu for Best Lyrics at the 64th National Film Awards.

== Plot ==
Dharmadurai, known as the village drunkard, constantly embarrasses his brothers and brother-in-law, who run a chit-fund business. They often lock him up and mistreat him. Only his mother, Pandiyamma, and his friend Gopalaswamy sympathize with him. One night, Pandiyamma overhears her sons planning to kill Dharmadurai, so she helps him escape, urging him to start a new life far away. Dharmadurai, unaware that he has taken the chit-fund money with him, leaves for Madurai. When his brothers discover his absence and the missing money, they search for him but eventually give up. In a flash back, it is shown that Dharmadurai, the first graduate from his village, pursued his MBBS at Madurai Medical College. During college, he was part of a close-knit group with Subhashini and Stella, who harbored feelings for him. Inspired by Dr Kamaraj's ethos of serving the underprivileged, they vowed to stay in India post-graduation but lost touch thereafter. Back in the present, seeking solace and guidance, Dharmadurai seeks out Stella, only to discover she had died in a car accident. Then, he goes to the hospital where Subhashini is working. Subhashini, who is now married to a Hyderabad-based doctor, is alarmed at the change in Dharmadurai. Dharmadurai tells her why he had become an alcoholic.

Following his graduation, Dharmadurai returned to his village and established a clinic. One day, he encountered Anbuselvi, a farm laborer who brought some sick elderly women to his clinic. Dharmadurai was immediately drawn to Anbuselvi and sought permission from her father, Paraman, to marry her, which Paraman granted. Anbuselvi also agreed to the marriage, and plans were made. However, Dharmadurai's brothers demanded a large dowry, including gold ornaments and a significant sum of money, which Paraman refused. Consequently, the marriage was called off, leading to Anbuselvi's tragic suicide. Filled with rage and grief, Dharmadurai confronted his brothers, blaming them for the tragedy. He was on the brink of violence when he was stopped by Pandiyamma. Devastated and betrayed, Dharmadurai closed his clinic and turned to alcohol. After Subhashini hears Dharmadurai's story, she brings him to her apartment and helps him recover from his struggles with alcohol. As they spend more time together, Subhashini shares her own painful experience of her husband's betrayal and her decision to divorce him. She confesses her long-standing love for Dharmadurai since their college days, and he reciprocates her feelings. They decide to start a life together, and Subhashini bravely ends her marriage. Dharmadurai returns to his medical practice in their town, dedicating himself to helping the needy. His reputation grows, and one day, a blind Dr Kamaraj, inspired by Dharmadurai's work, pays him a visit. Upon Dr Kamaraj's suggestion, Dharmadurai and Subhashini decide to marry. As they plan their future together, Subhashini becomes pregnant with Dharmadurai's child. Subhashini encourages Dharmadurai to reconcile with his family, suggesting he return to his village to make amends and share the news of their upcoming marriage. Dharmadurai agrees, ready to face his past and embrace his future with Subhashini and their child.

In his village, Dharmadurai discovers that his family had to leave their home after being compelled to sell it to repay the villagers, who had uncovered their embezzled funds. Upon arriving at the makeshift hut where his mother and brothers now reside, one of his brothers, consumed by anger at Dharmadurai's actions, strikes him with a spanner. However, when he realizes that Dharmadurai has recovered the stolen money, he is overcome with remorse. Pandiyamma rushes Dharmadurai to the hospital, where he receives treatment from a former college classmate with whom he had conflicts in college. While recuperating, Dharmadurai receives a call from Subhashini, urging him to return promptly, as both she and their unborn child eagerly await his arrival.

== Cast ==
- Vijay Sethupathi as Dr Dharmadurai
- Tamannaah Bhatia as Dr Subhashini
- Aishwarya Rajesh as Anbuselvi
- Srushti Dange as Dr Stella
- Ganja Karuppu as Gopal
- M. S. Bhaskar as Paraman
- Aruldoss as Beemaraasu
- P. S. Ganesh
- Rajesh as Dr Kamaraj aka Muniyandi
- Radhika Sarathkumar as Pandiyamma
- Soundararaja as Archunan
- Madhuvanti Arun as police inspector
- Vishalini as Dharmadurai's sister
- Abi Nakshathra as Roja, Dharma Durai's niece
- Florent Pereira as Stella's father
- Saravana Sakthi
- Jeeva Subramanian as herself, acted as compounder to Dr Dharma Durai

Cameo appearance

- R. K. Suresh in the song "Makka".
- Seenu Ramasamy as a Librarian in the song "Andipatti".

== Production ==
In November 2015, Seenu Ramasamy announced that he would direct Vijay Sethupathi in a film to be produced by R. K. Suresh of Studio 9 Productions. Following the project's announcement, Anand Kumaresan, who had initiated work on a film titled Vasantha Kumaran with the actor and producer in 2012, expressed frustration and demanded explanations regarding the delay of his project. Previously, the film had been suspended due to a disagreement between Suresh and Vijay Sethupathi. The makers of Dharma Durai disclosed that they were in talks with Lakshmi Menon, Aishwarya Rajesh and Gayathrie to play three of the film's four leading female roles. Production of the film commenced in mid-December 2015, with actresses Tamannaah Bhatia, Sshivada, Aishwarya Rajesh and Srushti Dange confirmed as part of the cast. Radhika Sarathkumar was cast to portray Sethupathi's mother.

== Music ==
Dharma Durai

Soundtrack album by Yuvan Shankar Raja
- Released: 3 August 2016
- Studio: U1 Records
- Genre: Feature film soundtrack
- Length: 19:15
- Language: Tamil
- Label: TrendMusic
- Producer: Yuvan Shankar Raja

Yuvan Shankar Raja chronology
| Yatchan (2015) | Dharma Durai (2016) | Chennai 600028 II (2016) |

Yuvan Shankar Raja composed the music for Dharma Durai. The Tamil album was released at an event on 3 August 2016.

| No. | Title | Writer(s) | Singer(s) | Length |
|---|---|---|---|---|
| 1. | "Endha Pakkam" | Vairamuthu | Chinmayi Sripada, Rahul Nambiar | 5:02 |
| 2. | "Poi Vaada" | Vairamuthu | Srimathumitha | 2:03 |
| 3. | "Makka Kalanguthappa" | Mathichiyam Bala | Mathichiyam Bala | 4:05 |
| 4. | "Naan Kaatrilae" | Vairamuthu | Karthik | 3:33 |
| 5. | "Andipatti" | Vairamuthu | Senthildass Velayutham, Surmukhi Raman | 4:32 |
| Total length: | | | | 19:15 |

== Release ==
Dharma Durai was theatrically released worldwide on 19 August 2016.

== Reception ==
=== Critical response ===
The film received positive response from critics.

Gautaman Bhaskaran of Hindustan Times gave 3.5/5 stars and commented, "Scripted with subtlety and helmed without melodrama, Dharmadurai is far better than any Tamil work one has seen in a long time", expressing that the film features strong performances and picturesque cinematography, telling the story of a former doctor dealing with family betrayal and personal struggles, albeit with some coincidental and preachy elements. The Hindu wrote, "Dharmadurai leaves us dry-eyed, despite having much potential for drama", noting that despite its potential and interesting themes about a village doctor navigating modern ideals and traditional expectations, it is undermined by heavy-handed messaging and literal dialogue that detracts from its emotional impact and storytelling. Sreedhar Pillai of The First Post, in his review, stated, "Dharma Durai is a feel-good family entertainer that works to a large extent due to Vijay Sethupathi, an actor of substance" and pointed out that strong performances from the cast are hindered by a thin plot and commercial twists.

S. Saraswath of Rediff.com rated the film 3/5, calling it, "An engaging screenplay, stunning music, wonderful performances, and the perfect rural ambiance make Dharmadurai a fun watch." He opened the film as a poignant tale of family, redemption, and self-discovery, albeit with some flaws in the screenplay, elevated by strong performances and a captivating rural setting. Malini Mannath of The New Indian Express quoted, "The film may have its moments that strike an emotional chord. But viewed as a whole, Dharmadurai doesn't completely fulfill." She also mentioned that the film highlights Sethupathi's robust performance but grapples with a meandering second half and contrived plot elements. M. Suganth of The Times of India rated the film 3/5 stars and conveyed that despite its affecting moments and strong performances, it is hindered by a slow narrative and synthetic sub-plots, preventing it from fully realizing its potential as an emotional roller coaster. Anupama Subramanian of Deccan Chronicle stated, "Barring a few dull moments, Seenu Ramasamy's Dharma Durai is a feel-good movie," and noted that it follows the journey of a once-promising doctor turned alcoholic as he seeks redemption and reconnects with his past, showcasing strong performances and emotional depth amidst occasional narrative shortcomings.

=== Box office ===
Dharma Durai was produced with a budget of ₹13 crore and earned ₹11.50 crore in its first week of release. According to The Hindu, the film broke even at the box office, suggesting a lifetime gross of approximately ₹26 crore.

== Accolades ==
| Year | Award | Category | Awardee | Outcome | Ref. |
|---|---|---|---|---|---|
| 2016 | Norway Tamil Film Festival Awards | Best Actor | Vijay Sethupathi | Won | |
| 2016 | Asiavision Awards | Best Actor – Tamil | Vijay Sethupathi | Won | |
| 2016 | Asiavision Awards | Best Actress – Tamil | Tamannaah Bhatia | Won | |
| 2016 | Asiavision Awards | Best Director | Seenu Ramasamy | Won | |
| 2017 | 6th South Indian International Movie Awards | Best Actress | Tamannaah Bhatia | Nominated | |
| 2017 | 6th South Indian International Movie Awards | Best Lyrics for "Endha Pakkam" Song | Vairamuthu | Nominated | |
| 2017 | 6th South Indian International Movie Awards | Best Supporting Actress | Aishwarya Rajesh | Won | |
| 2017 | 64th Filmfare Awards South | Best Supporting Actress | Aishwarya Rajesh | Nominated | |
| 2017 | 64th Filmfare Awards South | Best Lyrics for "Endha Pakkam" Song | Vairamuthu | Nominated | |
| 2017 | 64th National Film Awards | Best Lyrics for "Endha Pakkam" Song | Vairamuthu | Won | |
