= Thenmerku Paruvakaatru =

2010 film by Seenu Ramasamy

- Theatrical release poster
- Directed by: Seenu Ramasamy
- Written by: Seenu Ramasamy
- Produced by: Shibu Issac
- Starring: Vijay Sethupathi; Vasundhara Kashyap; Saranya Ponvannan
- Cinematography: Chezhiyan
- Edited by: Mu. Kasivishwanathan
- Music by: N. R. Raghunanthan
- Production company: Jotham Media Works
- Distributed by: Global infotainment
- Release date: 24 December 2010
- Running time: 140 minutes
- Country: India
- Language: Tamil

Thenmerku Paruvakatru (transl. Southwest Monsoon Breeze) is a 2010 Indian Tamil-language drama film written and directed by Seenu Ramasamy and produced by Shibu Issac. The film is named after a song composed by A. R. Rahman for the 1994 film Karuthamma. It stars Vijay Sethupathi (in his lead debut), Vasundhara Kashyap and Saranya Ponvannan in her 100th film. The music was composed by debutant N. R. Raghunanthan with cinematography by Chezhiyan and editing by Mu. Kasivishwanathan.

Thenmerku Paruvakkaatru was released on 24 December 2010. The film won multiple awards at the 58th National Film Awards ceremony, including Best Tamil Feature Film while Saranya and lyricist Vairamuthu were awarded the Best Actress and Best Lyricist prizes, respectively.

== Plot ==
Set in the backdrop of Theni, the story is about Murugaiyan (aka Murugan), who is a goatherder. He has a loving mother, Veerayi, who is a widow. She struggles hard to raise Murugan but has an overflowing affection for him. Meanwhile, there is a gang which attacks the villagers at night and steals their goats. Murugan, along with his group, manages to catch one of the members in an attack, a girl named Pechi. Pechi's family steals goats for their livelihood. While Murugan develops feelings for her, Pechi's family is known to be quite dangerous. Veerayi learns of this and asks Murugan to forget Pechi and marry a girl of her choice. He refuses to accept her wish and complications arise between mother and son. An old lady of her house advises Veerayi to let her son marry the girl whom he loves. A possessive widow tells how her husband was killed by a group of thieves. The head of the gang is none other than the father of the girl whom her son loves.

== Cast ==
- Vijay Sethupathi as Murugaiyan
- Vasundhara Kashyap as Pechi
- Saranya Ponvannan as Veerayi
- Aruldoss as Mokkaiyan
- Kadhal Sukumar
- Ajayan Bala
- Theepetti Ganesan
- "Stills" Kumar as Marichami
- Hemalatha as Kalaichelvi
- Jyothi
- Meenakshi
- Shobana
- Kambam Guna
- Seenu Ramasamy as Doctor (cameo appearance)

== Soundtrack ==
The music was composed by N. R. Raghunanthan, in his debut.

All lyrics are written by Vairamuthu.

Track listing
No.	Title	Singer(s)	Length
1.	"Aathaa Adikayilae"	Harini	00:54
2.	"Chinna Chinnangattula"	Shankar Mahadevan	5:00
3.	"Kalli Kallichedi"	Shweta Mohan	2:29
4.	"Kallikkaatil Pirandha Thaaye"	Vijay Prakash	5:28
5.	"Kallikkaatil Pirandha Thaaye" (Version 2)	Unni Menon	5:26
6.	"Nanmaikkum"	Vijay Prakash	1:54
7.	"Yedi Kallachi"	Vijay Prakash, Shreya Ghoshal	5:03
Total length:			26:14

== Release and reception ==
Thenmerku Paruvakkaatru was released on 24 December 2010. The Hindu wrote, "Thenmerku Paruvakkaatru with its mother sentiment makes a mark among films with rural themes". Sify called the film "OK" and wrote, "It is made like a [1970s] tear jerker with the central character being the all sacrificing mother". The New Indian Express wrote, "A film that has worked out well in all departments, Thenmerku Paruvakaatru is worth a watch.

== Accolades ==
Event	Category	Recipient(s)	Ref.
58th National Film Awards	Best Actress	Saranya Ponvannan	
58th National Film Awards	Best Lyricist	Vairamuthu (for "Kallikattil Pirantha Thayae...")	
58th National Film Awards	Best Tamil Feature Film	Seenu Ramasamy	
58th Filmfare Awards South	Best Supporting Actress – Tamil	Saranya Ponvannan	
5th Vijay Awards	Best Supporting Actress	Saranya Ponvannan	
5th Vijay Awards	Best Lyricist	Vairamuthu	
5th Vijay Awards	Special Jury Award	Thenmerku Paruvakaatru	
