= Seenu Ramasamy =

Indian film director, screenwriter and poet (born 1973)

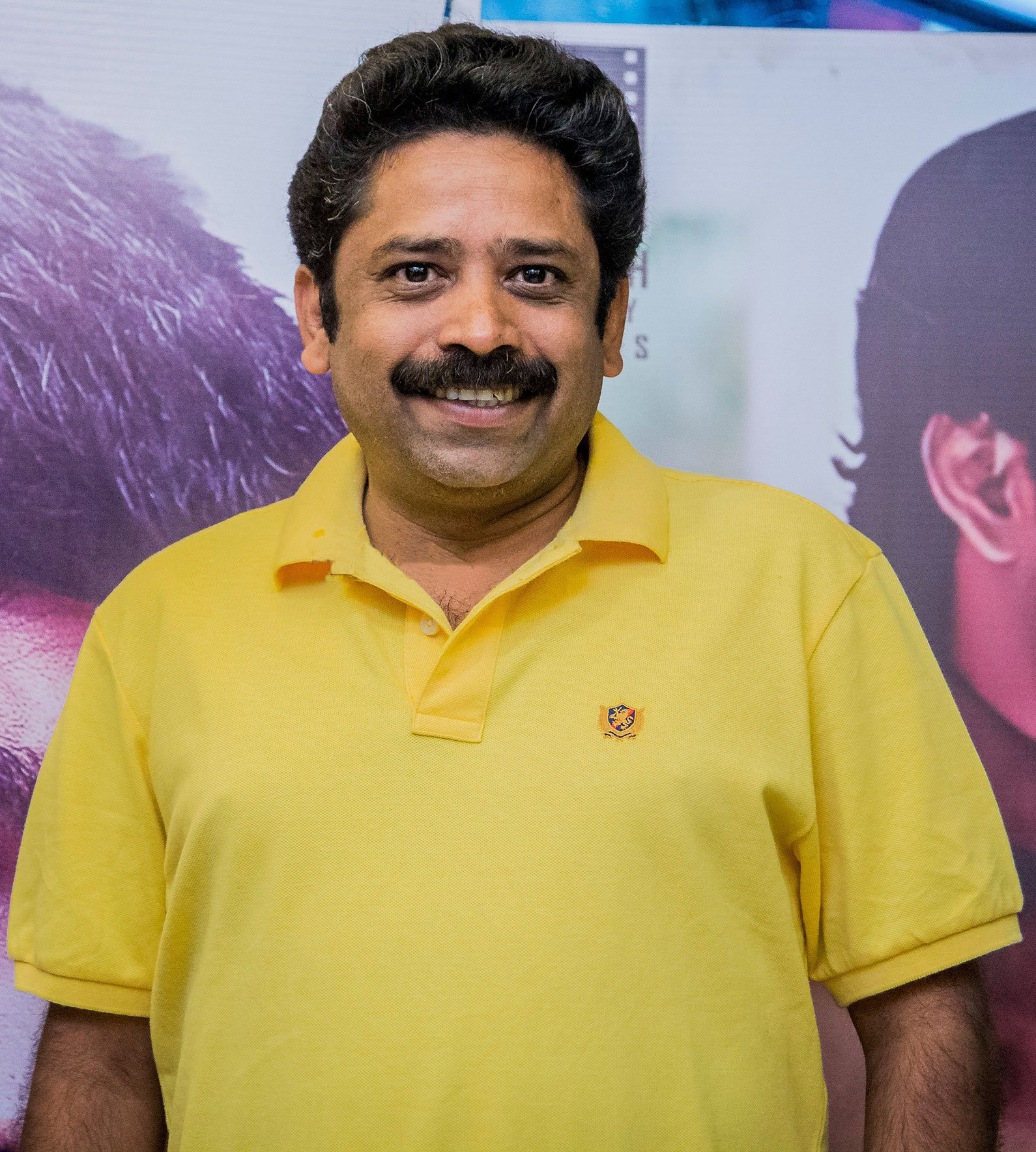
- Ramasamy at Dharma Durai Success Meet.
- Born: Seenu Ramasamy; 13 October 1973 (age 52); Madurai, Tamil Nadu.
- Occupation: Film director Screenwriter
- Years active: 2007-present
- Spouse: GS Dharshana (2007-2024)

Seenu Ramasamy (born 13 October 1973) is an Indian film director, screenwriter and poet who predominantly works in Tamil cinema. He is known for directing quality films like Thenmerku Paruvakaatru (2010), Neerparavai (2012), Dharma Durai (2016), and Maamanithan (2022).

== Career ==
He made his directorial debut with Koodal Nagar (2007). He garnered acclaim for the film Thenmerku Paruvakaatru, which went on to win the National Film Award for Best Feature Film in Tamil. A critic noted that "A well-crafted screenplay, clearly defined characters, a smooth, realistic flow of scenes, and fine performances from its entire cast, makes 'Thenmerku Paruvakaatru' one of the more watchable films of recent times". His next film Neerparavai (2012) also released to positive reviews with a critic stating that "Neer Paravai is a beautiful record of the lives of a community, their hopes and dreams, and the harsh reality of their lives. Go and see it". Ramasamy's next film Idam Porul Yaeval got stuck in production. His next film Dharma Durai (2016) received polarized reviews from critics, but was a box-office success. His subsequent film Kanne Kalaimaane (2019) released to mixed reviews with a critic stating that "Though Kanne Kalaimaane tries to be an ambitious film, despite much potential for drama, it lacks a strong script that most Seenu Ramasamy films have".

== Books ==
Seenu Ramasamy has written “Kaatral Nadanthen”.

== Filmography ==
Year	Film	Director	Actor	Role	Notes
2007	Koodal Nagar	Yes	Yes	Bus Conductor	
2010	Thenmerku Paruvakaatru	Yes	Yes	Doctor	National Film Award for Best Feature Film in Tamil; Vijay Special Jury Award
2012	Neerparavai	Yes	Yes	Doctor	
2016	Dharma Durai	Yes	Yes	Librarian	Asiavision Awards for best director
2019	Kanne Kalaimaane	Yes	No	—N/a	
2022	Maamanithan	Yes	No		
2024	Kozhipannai Chelladurai	Yes	Yes	Beggar	
TBA	Idimuzhakkam	Yes	No		completed
TBA	Idam Porul Yaeval	Yes	No	—N/a	Unreleased
