= List of Tamil films of 2018 =

This is a list of Tamil language films produced in the Tamil cinema in India that were released/scheduled to be released in 2018. The list contains only those films that are made in the Tamil language.

== Box office collection ==
The highest-grossing Kollywood films released in 2018, by worldwide box office gross revenue, are as follows.

Highest worldwide gross of 2018
Rank	Title	Production company	Distributor	Worldwide gross	Ref.
1	2.0	Lyca Productions	Lyca Productions, Dharma Productions, AA Films	₹710−800 crore (US$−83 million)	
2	Sarkar	Sun Pictures	Sun Pictures	₹256−290 crore (US$−30 million)	
3	Kaala	Wunderbar Films	Lyca Productions	₹159.6 crore (US$17 million)	
4	Thaanaa Serndha Koottam	Studio Green	Bharathan Films	₹90 crore (US$9.3 million)	
5	Chekka Chivantha Vaanam	Lyca Productions, Madras Talkies	Lyca Productions, Madras Talkies	₹80 crore (US$8.3 million)	
6	Kadaikutty Singam	2D Entertainment	Lyca Productions, Krikes Cine Creations	₹75 crore (US$7.8 million)	
7	Irumbu Thirai	Vishal Film Factory	Lyca Productions	₹65 crore (US$6.7 million)	
8	Vada Chennai	Wunderbar Films	Sakthi Film Factory	₹60 crore (US$6.2 million)	
9	Tik Tik Tik	Nemichand Jhabak	Screen Scene	₹51 crore (US$5.3 million)	
10	96	Madras Enterprizes	Seven Screen Studio	₹50 crore (US$5.2 million)	

== Released films ==
=== January—March ===
Opening		Title	Director	Cast	Studio	Ref
J A N	5	13 December	Buvanesh	Mukesh, Khushi Gadhvi, Brahmini Murala	Mukesh Films	
J A N	5	Onaaigal Jakkiradhai	JPR	Kabali Vishwanth, Riythvika, Baby Amrutha	S Bioscope Productions	
J A N	5	Paarka Thonuthe	Jai Senthilkumar	Arsha, Sarah, Amar, Fathima	Vasavi Films	
J A N	5	Saavi	R. Subramanian	Prakash Chandra, Sunu Lakshmi, Uday Mahesh	The Sparkland	
J A N	5	Vidhi Madhi Ultaa	S. Vijai Balaji	Rameez Raja, Janani Iyer, Daniel Balaji, Karunakaran	Rite Media Works	
J A N	12	Gulaebaghavali	Kalyaan	Prabhu Deva, Hansika Motwani, Revathi	KJR Studios	
J A N	12	Sketch	Vijay Chandar	Vikram, Tamannaah, Soori	Moving Frame	
J A N	12	Thaanaa Serndha Koottam	Vignesh Shivan	Suriya, Keerthy Suresh, Karthik, Ramya Krishnan	Studio Green	
J A N	19	Samuga Valaithalam	Easan	Badri, Priya, Padma, Bala Singh, Suruli Manohar	Victory Films	
J A N	19	Veera Thevan	Veeran Selvarasu	Kaushik, Meenalotchani, Karate Gopalan	GS Movies	
J A N	26	Bhaagamathie	G. Ashok	Anushka Shetty, Unni Mukundan, Jayaram	Studio Green, UV Creations	
J A N	26	Mannar Vagaiyara	Boopathy Pandian	Vemal, Anandhi, Prabhu, Karthik Kumar	A3V Cinemaz	
J A N	26	Nimir	Priyadarshan	Udhayanidhi Stalin, Namitha Pramod, Parvatii Nair	Moonshot Entertainment	
J A N	26	Saranalayam	Rasu Jeganathan	Ashwin Kumar, Sri Priyanka, Singampuli	Go Production	
F E B	2	Madura Veeran	P. G. Muthiah	Shanmugapandian, Meenakshi, Samuthirakani	P. G. Media Works, V Studios	
F E B	2	Oru Nalla Naal Paathu Solren	P. Arumugakumar	Vijay Sethupathi, Gautham Karthik, Niharika Konidela, Gayathrie	7C's Entertainment, Amme Narayana Entertainment	
F E B	2	Padaiveeran	Dhana	Vijay Yesudas, Amritha Aiyer, Akhil, Bharathiraja	Evoke	
F E B	2	Visiri	Vetri Mahalingam	Ram Saravanannn, Raaj Suriya, Ramona Stephani	Mahalingam Productions	
F E B	2	Yemaali	V. Z. Durai	Samuthirakani, Sam Jones, Athulya Ravi	Latha Productions	
F E B	9	Kalakalappu 2	Sundar C	Jiiva, Jai, Shiva, Nikki Galrani, Catherine Tresa	Avni Cinemax	
F E B	9	Nari Vettai	Akash Sudhakar	Akash Sudhakar, Mahalakshmi, King Kong	Channel Akash Studio	
F E B	9	Savarakathi	G. R. Adithya	Ram, Mysskin, Poorna	Lonewolf Productions	
F E B	9	Sollividava	Arjun	Chandan Kumar, Aishwarya Arjun	Sree Raam Films International	
F E B	16	Manushanaa Nee	Ghazali	Saleem, Anu Krishna, Subbu Panchu	H3 Cinemas	
F E B	16	Melnaattu Marumagan	MSS	Rajkamal, Andreanne Nouyrigat	Udhaya Creations	
F E B	16	Naachiyaar	Bala	Jyothika, G. V. Prakash Kumar, Ivana	B Studios	
F E B	16	Nagesh Thiraiyarangam	Isaq	Aari, Ashna Zaveri, Kaali Venkat	Transindia Media and Entertainment	
F E B	16	Veera	Rajaraman	Kreshna, Iswarya Menon, Karunakaran	RS Infotainment	
F E B	22	Koottali	S. K. Mathi	Sathish, Krisha Kurup, Kausalya, Kalyan	SP Pixels	
F E B	23	6 Athiyayam	Six directors	Thaman Kumar, Sanjeev, Vinoth Kishan, Kishore	ASCII Media Hut	
F E B	23	Kaathadi	Kalyaan	Avishek Karthik, Sai Dhanshika, Daniel Annie Pope	Galaxy Pictures	
F E B	23	Keni	M. A. Nishad	Jaya Prada, Revathi, Parthiban, Anu Hasan, Nassar	Fragrant Nature Film Creations	
F E B	23	Merlin	Keera	Vishnu Priyan, Ashwini Chandrashekar, Lollu Sabha Jeeva	JSB Film Studios	
F E B	23	Tamizhananean Ka	Sathish	Sathish, Vandana Varadarajan, Preetha	Vetritamil Vuruvakkam	
F E B	23	Yenda Thalaiyila Yenna Vekkala	Vignesh Karthick	Azhar, Sanchita Shetty, Eden Kuriakose	Yogi and Partners	
M A R	2	Dharavi	Pavithran	Satheesh, Balu, Sunu Lakshmi, Prabu Sathish	ARS International	

=== April – June ===
Opening		Title	Director	Cast	Studio	Ref
A P R	20	Mercury	Karthik Subbaraj	Prabhu Deva, Remya Nambeesan, Sananth, Indhuja	Stone Bench Creations	
A P R	20	Munthal	Stunt Jayanth	Appu Krishna, Muksha, Rajendran, Nizhalgal Ravi	Harvest Moon Pictures	
A P R	27	Diya	A. L. Vijay	Sai Pallavi, Naga Shaurya, Veronika Arora	Lyca Productions	
A P R	27	Paadam	Rajashekar	Karthik, Vijith, Mona, Yashika Aannand	Rollon Movies	
A P R	27	Pakka	S. S. Surya	Vikram Prabhu, Nikki Galrani, Bindu Madhavi	Benn Consortium Studios	
M A Y	1	Sila Samayangalil	Priyadarshan	Prakash Raj, Sriya Reddy, Ashok Selvan, Varun	Prabhu Deva Studios, Think Big Studios	
M A Y	4	Alai Pesi	Murali Bharathi	Akhil, Anu Krishna, Singampuli	Vijayalakshmi Creations	
M A Y	4	Iruttu Araiyil Murattu Kuththu	Santhosh P. Jayakumar	Gautham Karthik, Vaibhavi Shandilya, Shah Ra, Yashika Aannand, Chandrika Ravi	Blue Ghost Pictures	
M A Y	4	Kaathiruppor Pattiyal	Balayya D. Rajasekhar	Sachin, Nandita Swetha, Rajendran	Lady Dream Cinemas	
M A Y	11	Iravukku Aayiram Kangal	Mu. Maran	Arulnithi, Ajmal, Mahima Nambiar, Vidya Pradeep	Axess Film Factory	
M A Y	11	Aaru Mudhal Aaru (Oru Iravu)	M. G. Reddy	Manjunath, Jayadeva	Sri Lakshmi MGR Movies	
M A Y	11	Irumbu Thirai	P. S. Mithran	Vishal, Samantha, Arjun	Vishal Film Factory	
M A Y	16	Amutha	P.S. Arjun	Sriya Sree, Anees Shaz		
M A Y	17	Bhaskar Oru Rascal	Siddique	Arvind Swami, Amala Paul, Nikesha Patel, Aftab Shivdasani	Harshini Movies	
M A Y	18	18.05.2009	Kuppan Ganeshan	Subash Chandra Bose, Dhanya	SSK Creations	
M A Y	18	Kaali	Kiruthiga Udhayanidhi	Vijay Antony, Anjali, Sunaina, Amritha Aiyer, Shilpa Manjunath	Vijay Antony Film Corporation	
M A Y	18	Kadhalargal Valibar Sangam	Kasi Vishwanathan	Sathya, Thamarai, Kovai Senthil	Vishnu Movie Makers	
M A Y	18	Paalkaari	Om Pulli Jeevarathinam	Minu Kurian, Shivani Grover	Raghul Varma J Movies	
M A Y	18	Seyal	Ravi Abbulu	Rajan Tejeshwar, Tharushi, Ramdoss, Renuka	C. R. Creations	
M A Y	25	Abhiyum Anuvum	B. R. Vijayalakshmi	Tovino Thomas, Piaa Bajpai, Prabhu, Suhasini	Yoodlee Films	
M A Y	25	Oru Kuppai Kathai	Kaali Rangasamy	Dinesh, Manisha Yadav, Sujo Mathew, Yogi Babu	Film Box Productions	
M A Y	25	Kaala Koothu	M. Nagarajan	Prasanna, Kalaiyarasan, Sai Dhanshika, Srushti Dange	Madurai Sri Kallazhagar Entertainment	
M A Y	25	Pei Irukka Illaya	Pa. Ranjithkumar	Vijayakumar, Livingston, Madhumitha	Team Work Talkies	
M A Y	25	Puthiya Bruce Lee	Mulaiyur A. Sonai	Bruce, Raziya, Ashwanth Thilak	Sree Dindigul Venkateshvaraa Pictures	
M A Y	25	Semma	Vallikanth	G. V. Prakash Kumar, Arthana Binu, Yogi Babu	Linga Bhairavi Creations, Pasanga Creations	
J U N	1	Antony	Kutti Kumar	Nishanth, Vaishali, Lal	Adithya Entertainment	
J U N	1	Mohana	Ra. Anand	Rajendran, Power Star Srinivasan, Kalyani Nair, Asmitha	Mooraa Pictures	
J U N	1	Panjumittai	S. P. Mohan	Ma Ka Pa Anand, Nikhila Vimal, Pandiarajan	Deepam Cinema	
J U N	1	Vayakattu Mappillai	Vimal Murugan	Vetrivel, Yogendra, Jothisha, Dayana	Jeeva Movie Makers	
J U N	1	X Videos	Sajo Sundar	Ajay Raj, Akruti Singh, Abhinav	Colour Shadows Entertainment	
J U N	7	Kaala	Pa. Ranjith	Rajinikanth, Huma Qureshi, Samuthirakani, Nana Patekar	Wunderbar Films	
J U N	14	Goli Soda 2	Vijay Milton	Samuthirakani, Chemban Vinod Jose, Rohini, Gautham Vasudev Menon	Rough Note Productions	
J U N	15	Ennodu Nee Irundhaal	M. Sathyamoorthy	Sathya, Manasa Nair, Rohini, Ajay Rathnam	Sayto Film Corporation	
J U N	15	Kannakkol	V. A. Kumaresan	Bharani, Karunya Ram, Ganja Karuppu	Ram Pictures	
J U N	15	Kilambitaangayaa Kilambitaangayaa	Razak	K. Bhagyaraj, Mansoor Ali Khan, R. Sundarrajan	Heaven Entertainment	
J U N	22	Andhra Mess	Jai	Raj Bharath, Tejaswini, AP Shreethar, Pooja Devariya	Showboat Studios	
J U N	22	Enna Thavam Seitheno	Murabasalam	Ghajini, Vishnupriya, Srinivasan, Mayilsamy	Inaindha Kaigal Kalaikoodam	
J U N	22	Kargil	Sivaani Senthil	Jishnu Menon, Prerna Sadani	Banner Sivani Studios	
J U N	22	Tik Tik Tik	Shakti Soundar Rajan	Jayam Ravi, Aaron Aziz, Nivetha Pethuraj, Ramesh Thilak	Thenandal Studio Limited	
J U N	22	Traffic Ramasamy	Vicky	S. A. Chandrasekhar, R. K. Suresh, Prakash Raj	Green Signal	
J U N	29	Asuravadham	Maruthupandian	M. Sasikumar, Nandita Swetha, Sheela Rajkumar	Seven Screen Studios	
J U N	29	Ethukadi Kaadhalicha	Ravi Rahul	Soundararaja, Black Pandi	Arun Creations	
J U N	29	Inba Twinkle Lilly	R. K. Vidhyadaran	Kovai Sarala, Saranya Ponvannan, Kalpana	Appu Movies	
J U N	29	Semma Botha Aagathey	Badri Venkatesh	Atharvaa, Mishti, Anaika Soti	Kickass Entertainment	

=== July – September ===
Opening		Title	Director	Cast	Studio	Ref
J U L Y	6	Kasu Mela Kasu	K. S. Pazhani	Shahrukh, Gayathri, Kovai Sarala, Ganja Karuppu	Ragav Movie Entertainment	
J U L Y	6	Mr. Chandramouli	Thiru	Karthik, Gautham Karthik, Regina Cassandra, Varalaxmi Sarathkumar	Creative Entertainers	
J U L Y	6	Roja Maaligai	Goutham	Amaran, Soumia, Aadukalam Naren, Devadarshini	1 Look Movies	
J U L Y	12	Tamizh Padam 2	C. S. Amudhan	Shiva, Iswarya Menon, Sathish	YNOT Studios	
J U L Y	13	Kadaikutty Singam	Pandiraj	Karthi, Sathyaraj, Sayyeshaa, Priya Bhavani Shankar, Arthana Binu	2D Entertainment	
J U L Y	13	Mangai Maanvizhi Ambugal	Vino	Prithvi Vijay, Mahi	Road Train Pictures	
J U L Y	20	Bodha	Suresh G.	Vicky, Mippu, Shanmugasundaram	50 50 Films Entertainment	
J U L Y	20	Maya Bhavanam	Om Shri Kannaji	Om Shri Kannaji, Mamatha Rahuth Mammu, Aathma Patrick	Ham-Sham Studios	
J U L Y	20	Ondikatta	Bharani	Vikram Jagadish, Neha, Kovai Senthil	Friends Cine Media	
J U L Y	20	Vinveli Payana Kurippugal	R. Jayaprakash	Athvik Jalandhar, Pooja Ramakrishnan, Jogikumar	Lemurian Thirakkalam	
J U L Y	27	Junga	Gokul	Vijay Sethupathi, Sayyeshaa, Madonna Sebastian	Vijay Sethupathi Productions	
J U L Y	27	Mohini	Madhesh	Trisha, Jackky Bhagnani, Suresh, Poornima Bhagyaraj	Marvel Worth Productions	
A U G U S T	3	Arali	A. R. Subbaraj	Madhu Soothan, Manjula Rathod	Am Rm Films	
A U G U S T	3	Enga Kattula Mazhai	Sri Balaji	Mithun, Shruthi Ramakrishnan, Appukutty, Aruldoss	Vaali Film Visions	
A U G U S T	3	Ghajinikanth	Santhosh P. Jayakumar	Arya, Sayyeshaa, Karunakaran	Studio Green	
A U G U S T	3	Kadal Kuthiraigal	Pugazhendhi Thangaraj	Rohini, Thalaivasal Vijay, Bose Venkat, Sreedhanya	Global Media Invest	
A U G U S T	3	Kadikara Manithargal	Vaigarai Balan	Kishore, Karunakaran, Latha Rao	Christ P International	
A U G U S T	3	Kattu Paya Sir Intha Kaali	Youreka	Jaivanth, Iraa Agarwal, Aadukalam Naren	White Horse Cinemas	
A U G U S T	3	Maniyaar Kudumbam	Thambi Ramaiah	Umapathy Ramaiah, Mrudula Murali, Samuthirakani, Thambi Ramaiah	Vu Cinemas	
A U G U S T	3	Nadodi Kanavu	Veera Selva	Mahendran, Subraja, Sivasankar	RRR Productions	
A U G U S T	3	Poya Velaya Patthukkittu	Viruthai Vel	Sandeep, Anu Krishna, Sai Gopiee	Harisritha Production	
A U G U S T	10	Azhagumagan	Azhagan Selva	Arjun Udhay, Malavika Wales, Singampuli, Ilavarasu	Avatar Movies	
A U G U S T	10	Kadhal Enakku Romba Pidikkum	C. Sakthivel	Suryavarman, Rio	Win Pictures	
A U G U S T	10	Moondru Rasikarkal	Shebi	Roshan Basheer, Thalaivasal Vijay, Yazir Saleem	Al-Tari Movies	
A U G U S T	10	Pyaar Prema Kaadhal	Elan	Harish Kalyan, Raiza Wilson	K Films	
A U G U S T	10	Vishwaroopam 2	Kamal Haasan	Kamal Haasan, Rahul Bose, Pooja Kumar, Andrea Jeremiah	Aascar Films, Raaj Kamal Films International	
A U G U S T	17	Kolamavu Kokila	Nelson Dilipkumar	Nayanthara, Yogi Babu, Saranya Ponvannan	Lyca Productions	
A U G U S T	17	Marainthirunthu Paarkum Marmam Enna	Rahesh	Dhruvva, Aishwarya Dutta, Radharavi, J. D. Chakravarthy	Etcetera Entertainment	
A U G U S T	17	Odu Raja Odu	Nishanth, Jathin	Guru Somasundaram, Nassar, Lakshmi Priyaa Chandramouli	Vijay Moolan Talkies	
A U G U S T	24	Echcharikkai	Sarjun	Sathyaraj, Varalaxmi Sarathkumar, Kishore, Vivek Rajgopal	Timeline Cinemas	
A U G U S T	24	Kalari	Kiran Chand	Kreshna, Vidya Pradeep, Jayaprakash	Nakshatra Movie Magic	
A U G U S T	24	Lakshmi	A. L. Vijay	Prabhu Deva, Ditya Bhande, Aishwarya Rajesh	Pramod Films	
A U G U S T	24	Merku Thodarchi Malai	Lenin Bharathi	Antony, Gayathri Krishnaa, Abu Valayankulam	Vijay Sethupathi Productions	
A U G U S T	30	Imaikkaa Nodigal	Ajay Gnanamuthu	Nayanthara, Atharvaa, Raashi Khanna, Anurag Kashyap	Cameo Films India	
A U G U S T	31	60 Vayadu Maaniram	Radha Mohan	Vikram Prabhu, Prakash Raj, Samuthirakani, Indhuja	V Creations	
A U G U S T	31	Aaruthra	Pa. Vijay	Pa. Vijay, Meghali, K. Bhagyaraj, S. A. Chandrasekhar	Banner Vil Makers	
A U G U S T	31	Annanukku Jai	Rajkumar	Dinesh, Mahima Nambiar, RJ Balaji	Grassroot Film Company	
S E P T E M B E R	7	Avalukkenna Azhagiya Mugam	A. Kesavan	Vijay Karthik, Poovarasan, Sabaree, Yogi Babu	Kathiravan Studios	
S E P T E M B E R	7	Padithavudan Kilithu Vidavum	Hari Uttiraa	Cool Suresh, Panparag Ravi, Nellai Siva	I Creations	
S E P T E M B E R	7	Rajavin Paarvai Raniyin Pakkam	Azhagu Raj	Adhava, Avanthika Mohan, Gana Ulaganathan	Vikash Film International	
S E P T E M B E R	7	Torchlight	Abdul Majith	Sadha, Riythvika, Varun Udhai	Confident Film Cafe	
S E P T E M B E R	7	Thodraa	Madhu Raj	Prithvi Rajan, Veena Nandakumar, M. S. Kumar	J. S. Aburvaa Production	
S E P T E M B E R	7	Vanjagar Ulagam	Manoj Beedha	Guru Somasundaram, Anisha Ambrose, Chandini Tamilarasan	Labyrinth Films	
S E P T E M B E R	13	Seema Raja	Ponram	Sivakarthikeyan, Samantha, Simran	24AM Studios	
S E P T E M B E R	13	U Turn	Pawan Kumar	Samantha, Aadhi, Narain, Rahul Ravindran	Pawan Kumar Studios	
S E P T E M B E R	21	Eghantham	Arsal Arumugam	Vivanth, Neeraja, Thennavan, Anupama Kumar	Annai Tamil Cinemas	
S E P T E M B E R	21	Medai	S. N. Hariram	Pugazh, Selvam	Priyam Movie Creations	
S E P T E M B E R	21	Raja Ranguski	Dharani Dharan	Shirish, Chandini Tamilarasan, Anupama Kumar	Vasan Productions	
S E P T E M B E R	21	Saamy Square	Hari	Vikram, Keerthy Suresh, Aishwarya Rajesh, Bobby Simha	Thameens Films	
S E P T E M B E R	27	Chekka Chivantha Vaanam	Mani Ratnam	Arvind Swami, Silambarasan, Arun Vijay, Vijay Sethupathi, Jyothika, Aditi Rao Hydari, Aishwarya Rajesh	Lyca Productions, Madras Talkies	
S E P T E M B E R	28	Aadavar	Sriranjan	Kiran, Saravanan, Gana Ulaganathan	Thambi Deiva Media	
S E P T E M B E R	28	Pariyerum Perumal	Mari Selvaraj	Kathir, Anandhi, Yogi Babu	Neelam Productions	

=== October – December ===
Opening		Title	Director	Cast	Studio	Ref
O C T O B E R	5	'96	Prem Kumar	Vijay Sethupathi, Trisha, Aadhitya Bhaskhar, Gouri G. Kishan	Madras Enterprises	
O C T O B E R	5	Nota	Anand Shankar	Vijay Devarakonda, Mehreen Pirzada, Sathyaraj, Nassar	Studio Green	
O C T O B E R	5	Raatchasan	Ramkumar	Vishnu, Amala Paul, Kaali Venkat	Axess Film Factory	
O C T O B E R	5	Yaagan	Vinoth Thangavel	Sajan, Anjena Kirti, Jayaraj	Mappanar Production	
O C T O B E R	12	Aan Devathai	Thaamira	Samuthirakani, Ramya Pandian, Radha Ravi	Sigaram Cinemas	
O C T O B E R	12	Adanga Pasanga	R. Selvanathan	Arivazhagan, Jalandhar Rajendhiran, Narthagi Swathi	New Vision Creations	
O C T O B E R	12	Amavasai	Rakesh Sawant	Jai Akash, Nupur Mehta, Mumaith Khan	Rakesh Sawant Production	
O C T O B E R	12	Kalavani Sirukki	Ravi Rahul	Saamy, Diwakar Sankar Ganesh, Anju Reddy	Rana Creations	
O C T O B E R	12	Koothan	Venky AL	Rajkumar, Srijita Ghosh, Nagendra Prasad, K. Bhagyaraj	Nilgiris Dream Entertainment	
O C T O B E R	12	Manusangada	Amshan Kumar	Rajeev Anand, Manimegalai, Sheela Rajkumar	AK Films	
O C T O B E R	12	Moonavathu Kann	A. V. Giri	Bose Venkat, Varun, Murali Mohan	Arunalaya Cinema	
O C T O B E R	17	Vada Chennai	Vetrimaaran	Dhanush, Aishwarya Rajesh, Andrea Jeremiah, Samuthirakani	Wunderbar Films	
O C T O B E R	18	Ezhumin	V. P. Viji	Vivek, Devayani, Azhagam Perumal	Vaiyam Mediyas	
O C T O B E R	18	Sandakozhi 2	N. Linguswamy	Vishal, Keerthy Suresh, Varalaxmi Sarathkumar, Rajkiran	Vishal Film Factory	
O C T O B E R	26	Genius	Suseenthiran	Roshan, Priyaa Lal, Singampuli, Aadukalam Naren	Sakthi Film Factory	
O C T O B E R	26	Jarugandi	A. N. Pitchumani	Jai, Reba Monica John, Amit Tiwari, Daniel Annie Pope	Shvedh Group	
N O V E M B E R	2	Raaga Thaalangal	R. Thirupathi Rajaji	Vijayan, Silk Smitha	Sri Dandayudhapani Movies	
N O V E M B E R	2	Santhoshathil Kalavaram	Kranthi Prasad	Ravi Mariya, Rudra Aura, Niranth, Kalyan	Sree Guru Cinemas	
N O V E M B E R	2	Vanmurai Paguthi	Nagaraj	Manikandan, NSKJ Manogara, Raja, Rafia Jaffer	Madurai Meenakshi Creations	
N O V E M B E R	6	Billa Pandi	Raj Sethupathy	R. K. Suresh, Indhuja Ravichandran, Chandini Tamilarasan	J. K. Film Productions	
N O V E M B E R	6	Kalavani Mappillai	Gandhi Manivasagam	Dinesh, Adhiti Menon, Devayani	Rajapushpa Pictures	
N O V E M B E R	6	Sarkar	AR Murugadoss	Vijay, Keerthy Suresh, Varalaxmi Sarathkumar	Sun Pictures	
N O V E M B E R	16	Kaatrin Mozhi	Radha Mohan	Jyothika, Lakshmi Manchu, Vidharth	BOFTA Entertainment	
N O V E M B E R	16	Thimiru Pudichavan	Ganeshaa	Vijay Antony, Nivetha Pethuraj, Sai Dheena	Vijay Antony Film Corporation	
N O V E M B E R	16	Utharavu Maharaja	Asif Kuraishi	Udhaya, Priyanka Thimmesh, Prabhu	Jaeshan Studios	
N O V E M B E R	23	Karimugan	Chella Thangaiah	Senthil Ganesh, Gayatri Rema	A Vimal Production	
N O V E M B E R	23	Karthikeyanum Kaanamal Pona Kadhaliyum	M. A. Bala	Deepak, Haritha, Black Pandi	Twinkle Labs Production	
N O V E M B E R	23	Pattinapakkam	Jayadev	Kalaiyarasan, Anaswara Kumar, Chaya Singh	SP Cinemas	
N O V E M B E R	23	Sagavaasam	S. Thomas Newton	Rajarajan, Jayashree, Power Star Srinivasan	Sathiyan Movies	
N O V E M B E R	23	Sei	Raj Babu	Nakkhul, Aanchal Munjal, Chandrika Ravi	Trippy Turtle Productions	
N O V E M B E R	23	Semmari Aadu	Sathish Subramanyam	Sathish Subramanyam, Haritha, Gopitha	Paisa Creations	
N O V E M B E R	23	Vandi	Rajeesh Bala	Vidharth, Chandini Tamilarasan, John Vijay	Rooby Films	
N O V E M B E R	29	2.0	Shankar	Rajinikanth, Akshay Kumar, Amy Jackson	Lyca Productions	
D E C E M B E R	7	Dhoni Kabadi Kuzhu	P. Iyappan	Abhilash, Leema Babu, Pugazh, Thenali	Manitham Thiraikkalam	
D E C E M B E R	7	Evanukku Engeyo Matcham Irukku	A. R. Mukesh	Vimal, Ashna Zaveri, Poorna	Sai Productions	
D E C E M B E R	7	Seemathurai	Santhosh Thiyagarajan	Geethan Britto, Varsha Bollamma, Adesh Bala	Buvan Media Works	
D E C E M B E R	7	Vinai Ariyar	K. T. Murugan	Jack Robinson, Kamali, Udayaraj, Scissor Manohar	Naagai Films	
D E C E M B E R	14	Bayangaramana Aalu	Arasar Raja	Arasar Raja, Risha, Ganja Karuppu	Pharristha Pictures	
D E C E M B E R	14	Johnny	P. Vetriselvan	Prashanth, Sanchita Shetty, Ashutosh Rana	Staar Movies	
D E C E M B E R	14	Prabha	A. Nanthan	Swasika, Vijayaram, Rajinipani	Tamizh Thirai Niruvanam	
D E C E M B E R	14	Thiru	Karthik Sivan	Karthik Sivan, Kushi Nair, Mohamed Dawood	Rock Entertainments	
D E C E M B E R	14	Thulam	Rajanagajothi	Nivad, Jayshree, Ponnambalam, Manobala	Magical Creations Movies	
D E C E M B E R	14	Thuppakki Munai	Dinesh Selvaraj	Vikram Prabhu, Hansika Motwani, Vela Ramamoorthy	V Creations	
D E C E M B E R	20	Seethakaathi	Balaji Tharaneetharan	Vijay Sethupathi, Archana, Mahendran	Passion Studios	
D E C E M B E R	21	Adanga Maru	Karthik Thangavel	Jayam Ravi, Raashi Khanna	Home Movie Makers	
D E C E M B E R	21	Kanaa	Arunraja Kamaraj	Aishwarya Rajesh, Sathyaraj, Darshan	Sivakarthikeyan Productions	
D E C E M B E R	21	Maari 2	Balaji Mohan	Dhanush, Sai Pallavi, Kreshna, Tovino Thomas	Wunderbar Films	
D E C E M B E R	21	Silukkuvarupatti Singam	Chella	Vishnu, Regina Cassandra, Oviya	Vishnu Vishal Studioz	

== Awards ==
Category/organization	Filmfare Awards South 21 December 2019	SIIMA Awards 16 August 2019	Ananda Vikatan Cinema Awards 3 January 2019
Best Film	Pariyerum Perumal	Pariyerum Perumal	Merku Thodarchi Malai
Best Director	Ram Kumar; Ratsasan	Pandiraj; Kadaikutty Singam	Mari Selvaraj; Pariyerum Perumal
Best Actor	Dhanush / Vijay Sethupathi; Vada Chennai / '96	Dhanush; Vada Chennai	Dhanush; Maari 2 / Vada Chennai
Best Actress	Trisha '96	Trisha '96	Trisha '96
Best Music Director	Govind Vasantha '96	Anirudh Ravichander; Kolamavu Kokila	Santhosh Narayanan; Kaala / Pariyerum Perumal / Vada Chennai

== See also ==
- List of Tamil films of 2017
- List of Tamil films of 2019
