= Seethamma Andalu Ramayya Sitralu =

- Directed by: Srinivas Gavireddy
- Written by: Srinivas Gavireddy
- Produced by: S Sailendra Babu; Sridhar Reddy; Harish Duggishetti
- Starring: Raj Tarun; Arthana; Ranadheer
- Cinematography: Vishwa Devabattula
- Edited by: Karthika Srinivas
- Music by: Gopi Sunder
- Release date: 29 January 2016
- Running time: 133 min
- Country: India
- Language: Telugu

Seethamma Andalu Ramayya Sitralu is a 2016 Indian Telugu romantic comedy film written and directed by Gavireddy Srinivas Reddy. Produced by S Sailendra Babu, Sridhar Reddy, Harish Duggishetti . It features Raj Tarun and Arthana in the lead roles and Ranadheer and Raja Ravindra in the supporting roles. The film was released worldwide on 29 January 2016.

== Plot ==
Sri Ram (Raj Tarun) starts loving Seetha mahalakshmi (Arthana) from young age. Sri Ram remains in the village, Seetha goes to the city for higher education and keeps coming to the village for holidays. Sri Ram and Seetha become good friends after a couple of positive incidents.

Sri Ram tries to impress her in many ways and tries to express his love throughout the first half of the movie. Seetha rejects his proposal when she gets to know that Ram loves her. The Second half is more of how Ram wins her love and impresses Seetha's Family with his determination and overcoming some challenges.

== Cast ==
- Raj Tarun as Sri Ram
- Arthana as Seetha Mahalakshmi
- Ranadheer Reddy as Seetha's brother
- N. Shankar as Sri Ram's father
- Raja Ravindra as Seetha's father
- Aadarsh Balakrishna as Seetha's suitor
- Shakalaka Shankar as Sri Ram's friend
- Surekha Vani as Sri Ram's mother
- Sri Lakshmi as Sri Ram's grandmother
- Ananth as Temple priest
- Ratnasagar as Seetha's grandmother
- Sangeetha Reddy as Sruthi
- Mithuna Waliya as Lavanya
- Rajitha as Ranadheer's wife
- Hema
- Joginaidu

== Soundtrack ==
The Song Paravasame was a re-used tune by Gopi Sunder From the Malayalam film 10:30 am Local Call composed by himself and sung by Sachin Warrier.

Seethamma Andalu Ramayya Sitralu

Soundtrack album To Seethamma Andalu Ramayya Sitralu by Gopi Sunder
- Released: 10 January 2016
- Recorded: 2015
- Genre: Feature film soundtrack
- Length: 21
- Language: Telugu
- Label: Aditya Music
- Producer: S Sailendra Babu, Sridhar Reddy, Harish Duggishetti

Tracklist
No.	Title	Lyrics	Artist(s)	Length
1.	"Seethamalakshmi"	Krishna Chaitanya	Yazin Nizar	03:55
2.	"Paravasame"	Ramajogayya Sastry	Sachin Warrier, Divya S. Menon	03:55
3.	"Tarajuvvaki"	Bhaskara Bhatla	Suchith Suresan	04:03
4.	"Nuvvena"	Vanamali	Haricharan	02:36
5.	"Okko Nakshatram"	Sri Mani	Karthik, Divya S. Menon	03:34
6.	"Manishi"	Suddala Ashok Teja	Ranjith	02:39
Total length:				21:20
