= Porkalathil Oru Poo =

- Directed by: K. Ganeshan
- Produced by: J.C.Gurunadh & K Ganeshan
- Starring: Priya; Subash Chandra Bose; Nagineedu
- Music by: Ilaiyaraaja
- Running time: 112 minutes
- Country: India
- Language: Tamil

Porkalathil Oru Poo (transl. Flower on the Battleground) is an unreleased Indian Tamil-language film directed by K Ganeshan. It is based on the life of Isaipriya also known as "Lieutenant Colonel Issei Piriya", a journalist and television broadcaster for the rebel Liberation Tigers of Tamil Eelam. It was planned to be released in 2015 but was banned by the Censor Board as it would damage India–Sri Lanka relations.

== Controversy ==
Porkalathil Oru Poo was refused clearance and banned by the Censor Board of India after it was reviewed by its member S. Ve. Shekher on the grounds it would damage ties with Sri Lanka. The filmmakers have said they plan to challenge the ban.

On 8 October 2016, Justice T. S. Sivagnanam of the Madras High Court upheld the decision of the Film Certificate Appellate Tribunal's denial for certification of the film. He added that Isaipriya's mother and sister also opposed the release of the movie, fearing that it may affect their current life.

The music for the film is composed by Ilaiyaraaja.

== Cast ==
- Priya
- Subash Chandra Bose
- Nagineedu
