= Deepavali Bonus =

2024 Indian-Tamil language film

- Theatrical release poster
- Directed by: Jeyabal .J
- Written by: Jeyabal .J
- Produced by: Rajendra M Rajan; Punitha Rajan
- Starring: Vikranth; Riythvika; Harish
- Cinematography: Gautham Sethuram
- Edited by: Parthiv Murugan
- Music by: Maria Jerald
- Production companies: Transindia Media; Entertainment Private Limited
- Release date: 25 October 2024
- Country: India
- Language: Tamil

Deepavali Bonus is a 2024 Indian Tamil-language drama film directed by Jeyabal .J. The film stars Vikranth and Riythvika in lead roles. The film is produced by Deepak Kumar Tala of Sri Ankali Parameswari Productions, while the technical crew consists of music composer Maria Jerald, cinematographer Gautham Sethuram, and editor Parthiv Murugan. Deepavali Bonus released in theatres on 25 October 2024.

== Cast ==
- Vikranth as Ravi
- Riythvika as Geetha
- Harish as Sachin

== Production ==
Written and directed by debutant director Jeyabal J, the film stars Vikranth and Riythvika in the lead roles portraying the character of a couple named Ravi and Geetha respectively struggling to meet the expenses, as the festival of Diwali approaches. The film is produced by Deepak Kumar Tala of Sri Ankali Parameswari Productions, while the technical crew consists of music composer Maria Jerald, cinematographer Gautham Sethuram, editor Parthiv Murugan and art director Arun.

== Music ==
The soundtrack and background is composed by Maria Jerald. The first single "Yenga Poniyo" was released on 25 October 2024. The second single "Deepavali" was released on 26 October 2024.

Track listing
No.	Title	Writer(s)	Singer(s)	Length
1.	"Muthazhagu"	Maha	Anthony Daasan	3:15
2.	"Deepavali"	Maria Jerald	Santhosh Narayanan	3:50
3.	"Yenga Poniyo"	Maria Jerald	Akshaya Ramanathan	3:22
4.	"Vettaruva Kannukari"	Maria Jerald	Maria Jerald	1:58
Total length:				12:25

== Release ==
Deepavali Bonus released in theatres on 25 October 2024.

== Reception ==
Thinkal Menon of The Times of India rated two point five out of five and stated that "With a simple plot and a handful of characters, the director achieves what he sets out to do to a good extent."

Sreejith Mullappilly of Cinema Express rated three out of five and noted that "Jeyabal, however, shows plenty of restraint and slowly works his story into our hearts".
