= Yaavarum Vallavare =

- Theatrical release poster
- Directed by: N. A. Rajendra Chakravarthy
- Produced by: C Anand Joseph Raj
- Starring: Samuthirakani; Yogi Babu
- Cinematography: Jai
- Edited by: G. Rama Rao
- Music by: N. R. Raghunanthan
- Production companies: Eleven Eleven Productions Private Limited; Thee Community Pictures
- Release date: 15 March 2024
- Running time: 125 minutes
- Country: India
- Language: Tamil

Yaavarum Vallavare (transl. Everyone is powerful) is a 2024 Indian Tamil-language thriller drama film directed by N. A. Rajendra Chakravarthy, starring P. Samuthirakani and Yogi Babu. The film was released on 15 March 2024, after previously being scheduled for 29 December 2023.

== Plot ==
The film follows four different stories that eventually intertwine.

== Cast ==
- P. Samuthirakani as Krishnan
- Yogi Babu as Cameraman Bhuvan
- Riythvika as Revathy, Krishnan's Wife
- Arunthathi as Thenmozhi, Selvam's Wife
- Ramesh Thilak as the director
- Rajendran as Paandi
- Ilavarasu as Bhaskar
- Devadarshini as Athaachi
- Mayilsamy as Mani
- Bose Venkat as SI Kirubakaran
- Joe Malloori
- Poster Nandakumar
- Cheran Raj as Das
- Vijay Sethupathi as Selvam (photo presence only)

== Production ==
The film is based on a true event that takes place from 6 pm to 6 am. It marks the directorial debut of N. A. Rajendra Chakravarthy.

== Reception ==
Sreejith Mullapilly from The New Indian Express rated the film two out of five and wrote that "While strongly opinionated monologues might still be entertaining even if they don’t serve the plot of the film, they hardly work in a disjointed film like Yaavarum Vallavare". Roopa Radhakrishnan from The Times of India rated the film 2 1/2 out of 5 stars and wrote that "The film preaches rather than showcasing its on-the-face ideologies, which becomes an issue. Yavarum Vallvare falls short of making us feel more for the sad plight of its characters". Manigandan KR from Times Now gave the film the same rating and wrote that "Yaavarum Vallavare is a film that works in parts and that has nothing extraordinary to offer". A critic from Maalai Malar praised Samuthirakani as the best segment of the four, in addition to the music and the cinematography.
