= Akkaran =

- Theatrical release poster
- Directed by: Arun K Prasad
- Written by: Arun K Prasad
- Produced by: KKD
- Starring: M. S. Bhaskar; Kabali Vishwanth
- Cinematography: M.A. Anand
- Edited by: P. Manikandan
- Music by: Hari S R
- Production company: Kundram Productions
- Release date: 3 May 2024
- Country: India
- Language: Tamil

Akkaran is a 2024 Indian Tamil-language suspense crime film written and directed by Arun K Prasad. The film stars M. S. Bhaskar and Kabali Vishwanth, and was produced by KKD under the banner of Kundram Productions.

== Plot ==
Veerapandi, whose younger daughter Priya first went missing before being found dead, is determined to find out what exactly happened with her. He knows that both the individuals he has zeroed in on have something to do with the death of his daughter. However, both have different versions of what actually transpired

== Cast ==
- M. S. Bhaskar as Veerapaandi
- Kabali Vishwanth as Siva
- Venba as Devi
- Namo Narayana as Paranthaman
- Akash Premkumar as Arjun
- Priyadharshini Arunachalam as Priya

== Production ==
The film noted the debut of director Arun K Prasad.

== Reception ==
Abhinav Subramanian of The Times of India rated the film 2 out of 5 stars, writing "Debut director Arun K Prasad throws in a few interesting curveballs in Akkaran. As you watch the events unfold and the full extent of what happened to this family hits you, something strange happens."

Manigandan KR of Times Now gave the film 2.5 out of 5 stars, stating "A decent crime revenge thriller that manages to reasonably succeed in its mission of entertaining the audience". Additionally, a Dinakaran critic gave the film a mixed review.
