= Central Board of Film Certification =

Film certification body of India

- CBFC

Film Certification Body overview
- Formed: 15 January 1951; 75 years ago
- Jurisdiction: India
- Headquarters: Mumbai, Maharashtra
- Film Certification Body executive: Shashi Shekhar Vempati, Chairperson
- Parent Film Certification Body: Ministry of Information and Broadcasting
- Key document: Cinematograph Act, 1952
- Website: cbfcindia.gov.in

The Central Board of Film Certification (CBFC) is a statutory film-certification body in the Ministry of Information and Broadcasting of the Government of India. It is tasked with "regulating the public exhibition of films under the provisions of the Cinematograph Act 1952." The Cinematograph Act 1952 outlines a strict certification process for commercial films shown in public venues. Films screened in cinemas and on television may only be publicly exhibited in India after certification by the board and edited.

== Certificates and guidelines ==
Film-certificate categories

The board currently issues four certificates. Originally, there were two: U (unrestricted public exhibition with family-friendly movies) and A (public exhibition restricted to adults but any kind of nudity not allowed). Two more were added in June 1983 that are U/A (unrestricted public exhibition, with parental guidance for children under 12) and S (restricted to specialised audiences, such as doctors or scientists). The board may refuse to certify a film. Additionally, V/U, V/UA, V/A are used for video films with U, U/A and A carrying the same meaning as above. Variations of the U/A certificate were introduced in November 2024: U/A 7+, U/A 13+ and U/A 16+.

=== U certificate ===
Films with the U certification are available for unrestricted public exhibition and are family-friendly. These films can contain universal themes like education, family, drama, romance, sci-fi, fantasy and action etc. These films can also contain some mild violence, but it cannot be prolonged. It may also contain very mild sexual scenes (without any traces of nudity or sexual detail).

=== U/A certificate ===
Films with the U/A certification can contain moderate adult themes that are not strong in nature and are not considered appropriate to be watched by a child without parental guidance. These films may contain moderate to strong violence, moderate sexual scenes (traces of nudity and moderate sexual detail can be found), frightening scenes, blood flow, or muted abusive language. Sometimes such films are re-certified with V/U for video viewing. The age threshold was previously set at 12 years of age, but in 2024 this was further refined to 7, 13 and 16 years of age.

- UA 7+ – Unrestricted public exhibition, but with parental guidance for children below the age of 7 years and appropriate above the age of seven.
- UA 13+ – Unrestricted public exhibition, but with parental guidance for children below the age of 13 years.
- UA 16+ – Unrestricted public exhibition, but with parental guidance for children below the age of 16 years.

=== A certificate ===
Films with the A certification are available for public exhibition restricted to adults (18+). These films can contain strong violence, explicit and strong sexual scenes, abusive language, but words which insult or degrade women, men or any social group are not allowed. Controversial, adult or suggestive themes are considered unsuitable for young viewers. Such films are often re-certified with V/U and V/UA for TV, which does not happen in the case of U and U/A certified movies.

=== S certificate ===
Films with S certification cannot be viewed by the public. Only people associated with it (doctors, scientists, etc.) are permitted to view these films.

== History ==
The Cinematograph Act proposed in 1918, came into effect in 1920 during British colonial rule in India which regulated licensing of cinema houses and certification of films for public display. Seven years after the production of India's first film, Dadasaheb Phalke's Raja Harishchandra. Censorship boards were originally independent bodies under the police chiefs of the cities of Madras (now Chennai), Bombay (now Mumbai), Calcutta (now Kolkata), Lahore (now in Pakistan), and Rangoon (now Yangon in Myanmar).

After the 1947 independence of India, autonomous regional censors were absorbed into the Bombay Board of Film Censors. The Cinematograph Act of 1952 reorganised the Bombay board into the Central Board of Film Censors which was renamed the Central Board of Film Certification following the 1983 revision of cinematography rules. Censorship of films in India is governed by The Cinematograph Act, 1952 and its associated rules and guidelines drafted in line with section 5B of the act.

In 2016, the Shyam Benegal Committee was formed to lay down norms of film certification, with recommendation of procedures and guidelines for CBFC's operation. It submitted recommendations including emphasizing certification over censorship, more categories of certification, limited function of the board to reduce 'reign of terror', shifting advisory panel from Ministry of Information Broadcasting to members selected by NFDC, FFSI, FFI, NCPCR and NCW with 50% representation of women, and permitting the board to re-certify movies. The Shyam Benegal reforms has not been considered in drafting of any further bill.

The Film Certification Appellate Tribunal (FCAT) was a judiciary panel where filmmakers could appeal decisions of the CBFC which had been historically more progressive than CBFC and instrumental in overturning many CBFC decisions, notably of Bandit Queen (1994), Udta Punjab (2016) and Lipstick Under My Burkha (2017), and was positively received by filmmakers for quick resolutions. FCAT was abolished in 2021 along with 9 other panels, assigning FCAT's role to High Courts under the Tribunal Reforms Ordinance, 2021 which has been widely criticized for effectively enabling more stringent censorship in film industry.

The Cinematograph Act was amended in 2023 with the introduction of Cinematography Amendment Bill. It introduces new age-based certification categories, expanded scope to television and streaming services, and anti-piracy measures.

== Principles ==
The board has a list of major guiding principles to ensure healthy public entertainment and education and, using modern technology, to make the certification process and board activities transparent to filmmakers, the media and the public. Every video must undergo CBFC certification for telecasting or distributing over any platform in India. The board suggests the same standards for anywhere in the world.

== Refusal to certify ==
In addition to the certifications above, there is also the possibility of the board refusing to certify the film at all.

The board's guidelines are:

- Anti-social activities (such as violence) may not be glorified.
- Any controversial topics
- Criminal acts may not be depicted.
- The following is prohibited:
  - a) Involvement of children in violent acts or abuse.
  - b) Abuse or ridicule of the physically or mentally handicapped.
  - c) Unnecessary depictions of cruelty to animals.
- Gratuitous violence, cruelty, or horror.
- No scenes encouraging alcohol consumption, drug addiction or smoking.
- No vulgarity, obscenity, depravity or double entendres.
- No scenes degrading women (despite many sexist movies being certified), including sexual violence (as much as possible).
- No denigration by race, religion or other social group.
- No promotion of sectarian, radicialism, obscurantist, anti-scientific and anti-national attitudes.
- Relations with foreign countries should not be affected.
- No national symbols or emblems, except in accordance with the Emblems and Names (Prevention of Improper Use) Act, 1950 (12 of 1950).

== Composition and leadership ==
The board consists of a chairperson and 23 members, all of whom are appointed by the central government. Shashi Shekhar Vempati chairs the board; Vempati became its 29th chairperson on 6 May 2026. The board, headquartered in Mumbai, has nine regional offices, in Bengaluru, Chennai, Cuttack, Kolkata, Guwahati, Hyderabad, Mumbai, New Delhi and Thiruvananthapuram.

Chairpersons of CBFC
No.	Name	From	To
1	C. S. Aggarwal	15 January 1951	14 June 1954
2	B. D. Mirchandani	15 June 1954	9 June 1955
3	M. D. Bhatt	10 June 1955	21 November 1959
4	D. L. Kothari	22 November 1959	24 March 1960
(2)	B. D. Mirchandani	25 March 1960	1 November 1960
(4)	D. L. Kothari	2 November 1960	22 April 1965
5	B. P. Bhatt	23 April 1965	22 April 1968
6	R. P. Nayak	31 April 1968	15 November 1969
7	M. V. Desai	12 December 1969	19 October 1970
8	Brig. R. Sreenivasan	20 October 1970	15 November 1971
9	Virendra Vyas	11 February 1972	30 June 1976
10	K. L. Khandpur	1 July 1976	31 January 1981
11	Hrishikesh Mukherjee	1 February 1981	10 August 1982
12	Aparna Mohile	11 August 1982	14 March 1983
13	Sharad Upasani	15 March 1983	9 May 1983
14	Suresh Mathur	10 May 1983	7 July 1983
15	Vikram Singh	8 July 1983	19 February 1989
16	Moreshwar Vanmali	20 February 1989	25 April 1990
17	B. P. Singhal	25 April 1990	1 April 1991
18	Shakti Samanta	1 April 1991	25 June 1998
19	Asha Parekh	25 June 1998	25 September 2001
20	Vijay Anand	26 September 2001	19 July 2002
21	Arvind Trivedi	20 July 2002	16 October 2003
22	Anupam Kher	16 October 2003	13 October 2004
23	Sharmila Tagore	13 October 2004	31 March 2011
24	Leela Samson	1 April 2011	16 January 2015
25	Pahlaj Nihalani	19 January 2015	11 August 2017
26	Prasoon Joshi	12 August 2017	2 May 2026
27	Shashi Shekhar Vempati	6 May 2026	Incumbent

== Criticism ==
The CBFC faces criticism from filmmakers and the general Indian public for what is viewed as arbitrary censorship or "censorship raj" (lit. 'Censorship rule'), for demanding extensive cuts in films touching on caste, mythology, politics, and sensitive events. Filmmakers have criticized abuse of the CBFC towards partisan political ends, the presence of corruption in the board's certification process, and outdated laws such as the Cinematograph Act, 1952.

CBFC chairpersons, Leela Samson and Pahlaj Nihalani have both claimed of political pressure from the Ministry of Information and Broadcasting in the certification process during their terms, which the ministry has denied. Leela Samson also resigned from her chairperson role in CBFC, in protest of political interference in the board's work in 2015. Samson was replaced by Pahlaj Nihalani, whose Bharatiya Janata Party affiliation triggered a wave of additional board resignations with claims of lowered tolerance within the board for anything politically inflammable or inconvenient. The abolition of FCAT in 2021, is also criticized for imposing more stringent enforcement of censorship on films.

The CBFC has been criticized for refusing to certify movies to prevent damaging India's relationship with other countries, such as investigative documentary No Fire Zone: In the Killing Fields of Sri Lanka and movies Porkalathil Oru Poo and Neelam, in view of protecting the diplomatic relationship between India and Sri Lanka. CBFC guidelines require films to avoid straining India's relationship with other nations. It has also been criticized for acting in favor of corporate entities, for example denying certification of the film "Charlie and the Coca Cola Company: Quit India" in 2016, in which cola companies were accused of abusing ground water, rivers, land, livelihoods, and Indian law.

== CBFC data breach ==
In October 2026, certification documents of around 500 films were reported exposed in a data leak at the Central Board of Film Certification (CBFC), and an investigation was opened.
