= Shashi Shekhar Vempati =

Indian technocrat and media executive

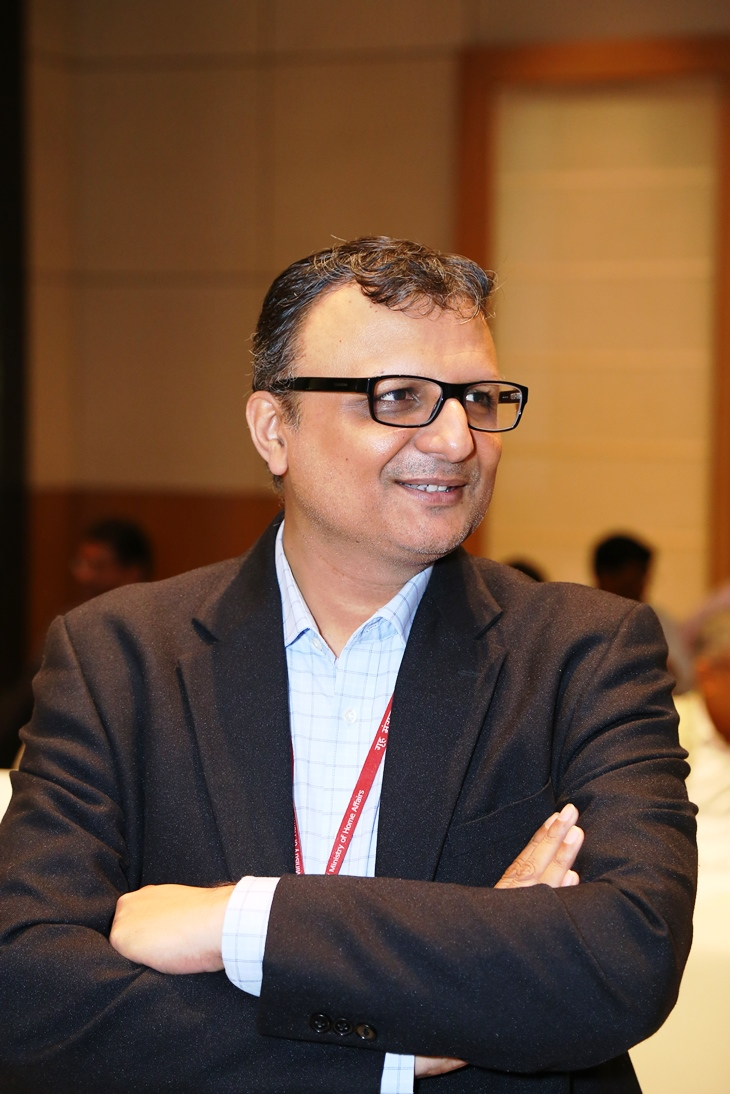
- Vempati in 2019
- Education: IIT Bombay
- Occupations: Technocrat, media executive
- Known for: CEO of Prasar Bharati (2017–2022); Chairperson of the Central Board of Film Certification (2026–present)
- Awards: Padma Shri (2026)

Shashi Shekhar Vempati is an Indian technocrat and media executive who served as the chief executive officer (CEO) of Prasar Bharati between 2017 and 2022. An alumnus of IIT Bombay, he was the first non-bureaucrat and the youngest individual to be appointed to the position since the broadcaster's inception. In January 2026, the Government of India honored him with the Padma Shri, the nation's fourth-highest civilian award, for his contributions to media, technology, and public policy. On May 8, 2026, following Prasoon Joshi's appointment to Prasar Bharati, Vempati was appointed as the chairperson of the Central Board of Film Certification.

== Education and early career ==
Vempati graduated from the Indian Institute of Technology Bombay. He began his professional career in the private sector, spending 15 years at the technology firm Infosys. During this period, he authored several patents related to real-time event management within wireless sensor networks.

He later transitioned to digital media, leading the startup Niti Digital. In this role, he was a key figure in the digital communication strategies for the 2014 Indian general election.

== Career ==
=== Prasar Bharati (2017–2022) ===
In 2017, Vempati was selected by a committee headed by the vice president of India to lead Prasar Bharati, which oversees Doordarshan and All India Radio. His tenure was marked by efforts to modernize public broadcasting and enhance digital outreach. Alongside his role at Prasar Bharati, he held the additional responsibility of CEO for Rajya Sabha TV from 2017 to 2019.

During his time in public service, Vempati chaired the Committee for Science and Technology Communication under the Department of Science and Technology and led the Educational Media Experts Committee for the University Grants Commission.

=== Artificial intelligence and deep tech ===
Following his term at Prasar Bharati, Vempati co-founded the DeepTech for Bharat Foundation (AI4India.org), an initiative aimed at developing India's deep technology ecosystem.

In November 2025, he was appointed as an Independent Director on the board of the BharatGen Technology Foundation. A Section 8 company based at IIT Bombay, the foundation is tasked with creating sovereign foundational artificial intelligence models for India under the IndiaAI Mission of the Ministry of Electronics and Information Technology.

== Board memberships and publications ==
Vempati has served on the governing boards of the Indian Institute of Mass Communication and the Broadcast Audience Research Council (BARC). He is also the author of the book Collective Spirit Concrete Action: Mann ki Baat and its Influence on India, which examines the impact of the prime minister's radio program on national discourse.

== Central Board of Film Certification (2026–present) ==
On May 8, 2026, Vempati was appointed as the chairperson of the Central Board of Film Certification (CBFC), nearly a week after former incumbent Prasoon Joshi was appointed to lead Prasar Bharati.

== Awards ==
- Padma Shri (2026)
