= Namma Magu =

Indian Kannada-language drama film

- Film poster
- Directed by: K. Ganeshan
- Written by: K. Ganeshan
- Produced by: K. Ganeshan
- Starring: Mevishna; K. Ganeshan
- Cinematography: Chandran Palani
- Edited by: Sanjeeva
- Music by: Bharanidaran
- Release date: 23 December 2020 (IOM)
- Country: India
- Language: Kannada

Namma Magu (Our Child) is a 2020 Indian Kannada-language drama film directed, produced, and written by K. Ganeshan, who co-stars in the film alongside Mevishna. The film is about child trafficking. The film was the first Kannada film to be screened at UNESCO's International Organization for Migration.

== Cast ==
- Mevishna (credited as Baby Mevishna)
- K. Ganeshan as a photographer

== Production ==
K. Ganeshan was inspired by a girl selling pens at a junction in Bengaluru near his workplace. She was reportedly brought there from a Kolkata gang, who had chopped her tongue so she would not communicate. Part of the film was shot in Karnataka. The film was made in 2017 but was not released till 2020 due to the film not getting any subsidy from the Karnataka state or central government.

== Accolades ==
K. Ganeshan won the Best Director award at the Moscow International Film Festival.
