= Vennila Kabaddi Kuzhu 2 =

2019 Indian Tamil action sports drama film

- Directed by: Selva Sekaran
- Screenplay by: Selva Sekaran
- Story by: Suseenthiran
- Produced by: Poongavanam; Anandh
- Starring: Vikranth; Arthana Binu
- Cinematography: E. Krishnasamy
- Edited by: Ajay
- Music by: V. Selvaganesh
- Production company: Saai Arputham Cinemas
- Release date: 12 July 2019
- Running time: 140 minutes
- Country: India
- Language: Tamil

Vennila Kabaddi Kuzhu 2 (transl. White Moon Kabaddi Team 2) is a 2019 Indian Tamil-language sports action film directed by Selva Sekaran. A sequel to Vennila Kabadi Kuzhu (2009), the film is written by the original's director Suseenthiran and features Vikranth and Arthana Binu. An ensemble cast including Pasupathy, Kishore, Anupama Kumar, Soori, Appukutty, and Ganja Karuppu also plays pivotal roles. Featuring music composed by V. Selvaganesh, the venture began production in December 2016 and was released on 12 July 2019.

== Plot ==
Saravanan makes a living by selling audio cassettes. His father Saamy is a bus driver by profession, but his heart lies in Kabaddi. Whenever a match is being played, he comes there, thereby neglecting his work and getting suspended. Saravanan often scolds his father for his mistakes, and the family decides to sell all their jewels and buy an Ambassador car for Saamy to drive. However, he loses that too for a good deed, angering everyone. Elsewhere, Saravanan falls for a college girl named Malar from an upper-class family, and problems start for him. At an important juncture, Saravanan discovers who his father really is and sets out to become a Kabadi player, a sport which he hates, for his father. Whether the hero succeeds in his mission or not and gets his girl forms the rest of the story.

== Cast ==
- Vikranth as Saravanan
  - Ashwanth Ashokkumar as Young Saravanan
- Arthana Binu as Malar
- Pasupathy as Saamy, Saravanan's father
- Anupama Kumar as Chinnathaayi, Saravanan's mother
- Soori as Subramani
- Kishore as Savadamuthu
- Ganja Karuppu as Pandi, Saravanan's uncle
- Ravi Mariya as Pazhani, Malar's father
- Sonia Venkat as Malar's mother
- Appukutty as Appukutty
- Aruldoss as Doss
- Vasu Vikram
- Akalya
- Madurai Saroja as Malar's grandmother
- Poraali Dileepan as Kumar
- Karur Murali as Murali, Saravanan's friend
- Benjamin as Saravanan's friend
- Mippu as Saravanan's friend
- Pechimuthu
- Nitish Veera as Sekar
- Hari Vairavan as Ayyappan
- Ramesh Pandiyan as Pandi
- Maayi Sundar as Murthy
- Rail Ravi as Police Inspector
- Thavasi as Kodangi
- Paun Raj as Murugan
- Jatti Jaganathan as Young Saravanan's friend
- Vijay Ganesh
- Raandilya as Kabaddi Player
- Priya Asmitha in a special appearance

== Soundtrack ==
The film's soundtrack was composed by V. Selvaganesh.

No.	Title	Singer(s)	Length
1.	"Kabaddi Kabaddi"	Shankar Mahadevan	4:11
2.	"Orasatha Di"	Karthik, Shweta Mohan	4:41
3.	"Otha Parvayil"	Haricharan	3:52
4.	"Thiruvizha"	Anirudh Ravichander, Kalpana	4:16

== Production ==
Suseenthiran had written a script for the sequel of Vennila Kabadi Kuzhu (2009) soon after the release of the film, with the story taking forward the tale of the kabadi team following the death of their captain, portrayed by Vishnu in the original film. In March 2015, it was announced that Lakshman Narayan had been signed on to play the lead role after Suseenthiran was impressed with his performance in Jeeva (2014), while Pasupathy would portray his father. Aishwarya Dutta was also brought in to feature as the lead actress, before the film was put on hold.

News about the project re-emerged in November 2016, where it was revealed that Vikranth had instead been signed on to play the lead role. The film began production in a temple in Kovilanchery in the outskirts of Chennai on 10 December 2016, with actors from the original film like Kishore, Soori and Appukutty revealed to be playing pivotal roles. Pasupathy and Anupama Kumar joined the cast to essay important roles. A debutant actress, Arthana, was also brought in to play the leading female role.
