= Aadhaar (2022 film) =

2022 mystery drama film

- Release poster
- Directed by: Ramnath Palanikumar
- Starring: Karunas; Arun Pandian; Prabhakar
- Cinematography: Mahesh Muthuswami
- Music by: Srikanth Deva
- Release date: 23 September 2022
- Country: India
- Language: Tamil

Aadhaar is a 2022 Indian Tamil-language mystery drama film directed by Ramnath Palanikumar and starring Karunas, Arun Pandian and Prabhakar. It was released on 23 September 2022.

== Cast ==
- Karunas as Pachamuthu
- Arun Pandian as Head Constable Yusuf Bhai
- Prabhakar as Inspector Vijayan
- Uma Riyaz Khan
- Riythvika as Thulasi
- Ineya as Saroja
- Dileepan
- Sridhar as Auto driver

== Production ==
The title of the film relates to the concept of identity. The film marked Karunas’ reunion with director Ramnath Palanikumar after the comedy-drama, Ambasamudram Ambani and action-drama Thirunaal. During the audio release of the film, Arun Pandian criticised actors who charge large fees.

== Reception ==
The film was released on 23 September 2022 across Tamil Nadu. A critic from Cinema Express gave the film a mixed review, noting that "though it's not the first film that talks about the injustices served to the underprivileged, Aadhaar is a compelling watch that achieves what it intends to without much force-feeding--if you forgive the not-so-great craft". A reviewer from Times of India gave the film a mixed review, writing it is "a passable mystery that is undone by too much melodrama".
