= Enga Kattula Mazhai =

- Theatrical release poster
- Directed by: Sri Balaji
- Produced by: C.Raja
- Starring: Mithun Maheswaran; Shruthi Ramakrishnan
- Music by: Srivijay
- Production company: Vaali Film Visions
- Release date: 3 August 2018
- Country: India
- Language: Tamil

Enga Kattula Mazhai (transl. Where is the rain in the forest?) is a 2018 Indian Tamil-language romantic comedy film directed by Sri Balaji and starring Mithun Maheswaran and Shruthi Ramakrishnan.

== Cast ==
- Mithun Maheswaran as Murugan
- Shruthi Ramakrishnan as Mageshwari
- Aadhavan as a golden retriever (voice)
- Aruldoss as Agni Eshwaran
- Appukutty as Kuberan
- Chaams
- Jangiri Madhumitha as a nurse

== Production ==
The film is directed by Sri Balaji of Kullanari Koottam fame. Appukutty, who starred in Kullanari Koottam is also a part of this film. The film features a Golden Retriever in a prominent role and was produced by Rama Narayanan. The release of the film was delayed by Narayanan's previous venture Mersal (2017).

== Soundtrack ==
Soundtrack was composed by Srivijay.

- "Adada Kadhal" - Karthik
- "Ava Oru Loosu" - Gana Bala
- "Oor Mutham" - Haricharan, Suganya
- "Enga Katula Mazhai" - Suchith Suresan, Peer Mohammed
- "Kokku Pitchva" - Ranjith

== Release ==
The film released along with eight other Tamil films on 3 August 2018.

The Times of India gave the film a rating of one out of five stars and wrote that "Even for a generic comedy thriller, Enga Kaattula Mazhai is filled with clichés that turn it highly predictable". Cinema Express also gave the film the same rating and stated that "A poorly written spin-off of Thedinen Vanthathu, that hardly evokes a giggle".
