= Cadaver (2022 film) =

2022 Indian Tamil-language film

- Official release poster
- Directed by: Anoop Panicker
- Written by: Abhilash Pillai
- Produced by: Amala Paul
- Starring: Amala Paul; Harish Uthaman
- Cinematography: Aravind Singh
- Edited by: San Lokesh
- Music by: Ranjin Raj
- Production company: Amala Paul Productions
- Distributed by: Disney+ Hotstar
- Release date: 12 August 2022
- Running time: 123 Minutes
- Country: India
- Language: Tamil

Cadaver (transl. Corpse) is a 2022 Indian Tamil-language police procedural thriller film directed by Anoop Panicker and written by Abhilash Pillai. The film was produced under the Amala Paul Productions banner. The film stars Amala Paul, with Riythvika, Munishkanth, Thrigun, Harish Uthaman and Athulya Ravi in supporting roles. The film's music is composed by Ranjin Raj with cinematography handled by Aravind Singh and editing done by San Lokesh. The film was released on Disney+ Hotstar on 12 August 2022.

== Plot ==
The film starts off with a mystery man abducting and cruelly murdering Salim Rahman, a chief heart surgeon at a reputed JC hospital in the city. Bhadra Thangavel, an expert pathologist, aids the city's ACP Vishal in handling the case. Alongside, we also witness a prisoner, Vetri, in prison, who had already vowed to kill Salim Rahman by drawing his portrait on the walls of his cell. As this news leaks out, the commissioner and the pathologist are left with no choice but to interrogate Vetri.

Despite being in captivity, Vetri manages to kill his second target just as he vowed. This shocks the entire city, and they realize someone is helping him from the outside. Later, the film revolves around Vetri, his late wife Angel, and their connection to the case. Angel was actually pregnant at the time of her death, and the autopsy done was by none other than Salim Rahman. Bhadra raises a question with Vishal as to why a heart surgeon needs to conduct Angel's autopsy as her cause of death was due to blood loss from her head. That is when they find out that something is fishy with Angel's autopsy: the autopsy has never been done, and her heart is missing.

Vishal is transferred to another city, and Bhadra thinks over the case. It is then revealed that Bhadra met Angel before on a bus. She was returning back from a village to Vetri. Angel shows a locket to Bhadra in which she wants to keep miniature photos of her marriage with Vetri and their unborn child. After some days, Angel returns from the hospital and meets with an accident due to a chain snatcher. She is severely injured, and Vetri immediately takes her to a hospital where Salim Rahman works. It is shown that the baby was taken out from her womb, and Salim Rahman removed her heart for transplantation into a wealthy patient's body. A hospital nurse, Priya, takes away the baby for disposal only to find it crying suddenly. She takes the baby to her home and takes care of her.

Vetri, thinking his wife and child are dead, mourns for them. After a few days, Bhadra finds Angel's autopsy file while teaching students and finds a worker over there suspicious as he stares at Angel with grief. She questions him and finds out that he is Priya's father. He tells Bhadra about what had happened. She asks Priya's help in exposing the crimes. Initially afraid, Priya decides to serve justice for Angel. She sneaks into Salim's office, but Salim finds her and attacks her with his father and Dr. Abraham Abel. Priya, though wounded, helps Bhadra by telling her the names of the people who are responsible for Angel's death but succumbs to her injuries. Bhadra teams up with the church father and Priya's father to expose the crime to the society. The church father guides Vetri, who is then in prison, about what to do.

All the murders were not actually committed by Vetri, but by Bhadra. She punishes everyone according to the punishments given in puranas. Soon proper investigation is opened, and the crime is exposed. Vetri, now free from all charges, talks with Bhadra about his life ahead as his wife and child are dead. Bhadra gives Vetri a locket, which he opens and finds his and Angel's picture with the picture of Bhadra's daughter. The locket was actually the one Vetri had gifted Angel. Bhadra takes in the baby after Priya's death and raises her as her own. Vetri hugs his daughter with emotion. It is shown after a few days that students are afraid to conduct an autopsy over a dead body and Bhadra talks about the cadaver (dead corpse) being humiliated by not conducting an autopsy on it. It is revealed that the body is Ali Rahman's.

== Cast ==
- Amala Paul as Dr. Badra Thangavel
- Harish Uthaman as ACP Vishal IPS
- Munishkanth as Inspector Michael
- Thrigun as Vetri
- Athulya Ravi as Angel
- Riythvika as Priya
- Ravi Prakash as Dr. Salim Rahman
- Nizhalgal Ravi as Dr. Abraham Abel
- Velu Prabhakaran as Ali Rahman, Salim Rahman's father
- Vinod Sagar
- Palani
- Jaya Rao
- Gajaraj as Gajaraj
- Vaishnavi Pillai
- Jai Anand as Inspector
- Pasupathi Raj as Jail Superintendent Paramasivam
- K. R. Saravanan as Minister

== Production ==
The film's shoot started in 2019. The film was earlier planned to release in theatres, but it was released directly on Disney+ Hotstar.

== Release ==
The film had an OTT release on 12 August 2022. A critic from The Hindu noted that "Cadaver sets up the milieu and its characters quite well". A reviewer from the Times of India opined that "Cadaver is thrilling in parts". A reviewer from IndiaToday wrote that "Sincere Amala Paul fails to save bland investigative thriller".
