= Kabali Vishwanth =

Indian film actor

- Occupation: actor
- Years active: 2010–present

Kabali Vishwanth is an Indian actor who has appeared in Tamil language films. After appearing in small supporting roles and working as an assistant choreographer, he made his breakthrough as an actor with a supporting role in Pa. Ranjith's Kabali (2016).

== Career ==
Vishwanath started his career with a minor role in Singam (2010) before playing an anti-hero in S. A. Chandrasekhar's Veluthu Kattu (2010). He then portrayed small supporting roles in films including as Arun Vijay's friend in Thadaiyara Thaakka (2012), as Dinesh's elder brother in Attakathi (2012), and as Prakash Raj's neighbour in Dhoni (2012). He later moved on to assist dance choreographer Sridhar in films.

Vishwanath made a breakthrough as an actor after portraying a role in Pa. Ranjith's Kabali (2016), which starred Rajinikanth in the lead role. The film saw him credited as Vishwanth, and he subsequently kept the name for his future work. Portraying a Chennai-based gangster hired to protect Rajinikanth's lead character, the film and his role won acclaim. The high-profile nature of the film prompted several film makers to sign him on for their productions, and notably later worked on Sketch (2018) alongside Vikram and Linguswamy's Sandakozhi 2 (2018), portraying the husband of Varalaxmi Sarathkumar's character. He also worked on a Hindi-language film as well as portraying his first lead role in the horror-comedy, Onaaigal Jakkiradhai (2018). He portrayed Vikram's friend in Sketch.

== Filmography ==
Year	Film	Role	Notes
2010	Singam	Lover	
2010	Veluthu Kattu	Karuppusamy	
2012	Dhoni	Subramaniam's neighbour	Bilingual film
2012	Thadaiyara Thaakka	Selva's friend	
2012	Attakathi	Dinakaran's brother	
2013	Kolagalam	Pathmanabhan	
2015	Pokkiri Mannan	Marudhu's friend	
2016	Katha Solla Porom	Aravind	
2016	Kabali	Jai	
2018	Onaaigal Jakkiradhai	Azhagu	
2018	Sketch	Guna	
2018	X Videos	Rahul	
2018	Sandakozhi 2	Pechi's husband	
2021	Annaatthe	Kaalaiyan's friend	
2022	Theal		
2023	Run Baby Run	Van driver	
2023	Red Sandalwood	Karna	
2024	Akkaran	Siva	
2025	Coolie	Deva Mansion housemate	
2025	Vattakhanal		
