= Sketch (2018 film) =

Film by Vijay Chandar

- Theatrical release poster
- Directed by: Vijay Chandar
- Written by: Vijay Chandar
- Produced by: Kalaipuli S. Thanu
- Starring: Vikram; Tamannaah Bhatia
- Cinematography: M. Sukumar
- Edited by: Ruben
- Music by: Thaman S
- Production company: Moving Frame
- Distributed by: V Creations
- Release date: 12 January 2018
- Running time: 135 minutes
- Country: India
- Language: Tamil

Sketch is a 2018 Indian Tamil-language action thriller film written and directed by Vijay Chandar. The film features Vikram and Tamannaah Bhatia in the leading roles for the first time, with Soori, Baburaj and R. K. Suresh among others portraying supporting roles. The film was released on 12 January 2018.

== Plot ==
Jeeva aka Sketch lives with his uncle Dorai, who used to tow and bring back vehicles for which the monthly EMI had not been paid. However, during a fight, he loses his hand, and Sketch is provided with the job, who does his day-to-day job perfectly. Dorai's right-hand Ravi wanted to take over the business. However, Bhaskar "Boss" Settu agrees with Sketch coming up to the position.

At a college, Sketch tows a scooter that belonged to Priya, Ammu's friend. The next day, he happens to meet her on a bus. When some other guy tries to harass her, Sketch bats away his hand, when the bus stops quickly, causing Sketch to bump into Ammu. She mistakes this as him trying to make advances on her and yells at him, only later does she realise that he was trying to protect her, and she falls for him.

One day, Sketch loses a bike while bringing it back to the garage. The owner gets enraged and demands ₹2 lakh from Settu. Sketch realises that this was a plot by Ravi to embarrass him, when he faces them to retrieve the money and the stolen bike, which earns back Settu's trust, and they celebrate. Settu reveals that his father was insulted by a local goon named Royapuram Kumar, where he asks Sketch to sketch a plan to steal Kumar's car.

Sketch steals Kumar's car and ends up in a chase with police that ends with Sketch creating a rivalry with Kumar. Kumar brings a gang from another state to finish off Sketch and his team, where after one by one, Sketch's friends are killed, and Sketch is confused about who the killer is.

Later, Sketch is confronted by the boys, who were working along with Sketch in Settu's garage. The boys reveal that they planned and killed Sketch's friends out of jealousy to take Sketch's position and seemingly stab him to death. However, Sketch survives and he forgives them and protects the boys from police by helping them escape, where the film ends with a moral: avoid child labour.

== Cast ==
- Vikram as Jeeva/Sketch
- Tamannaah Bhatia as Amuthavalli
- Soori as Maari
- Baburaj as "Royapuram" Kumar
- R. K. Suresh as Ravi
- Sriman as Baskar
- Kalloori Vinoth as Chitti
- Kabali Vishwanth as Guna
- Hareesh Peradi as Settu Bhaskar
- Jangiri Madhumitha as Manju
- Sri Priyanka as Priya
- Vela Ramamoorthy as Sketch's father
- Aruldoss as Dorai, Sketch's uncle
- Abhishek Vinod as Shakthivel
- Meghali as Gayathri
- Cheenu Mohan as Gayathri's father
- Jeeva Ravi as police officer
- Ravi Kishan
- P. L. Thenappan
- Poster Nandakumar
- Krishnamoorthy
- K. S. G. Venkatesh as Amuthavalli's father
- Lollu Sabha Seshu
- Maayi Sundar
- Billy Murali

Cameo appearance

- Vijay Chandar in the song "Atchi Putchi"

== Production ==
In November 2016, director Vijay Chandar, who had previously made Vaalu (2015), revealed that his next project would feature Vikram in the lead role. Produced by Silverline Film Factory, who had worked on an incomplete fantasy film titled Karikalan with Vikram during 2010, the film was widely reported to be a remake of the American film, Don't Breathe (2016). Denying the reports, Vijay Chandar later clarified that it was an original script and the film would be set in North Chennai. M. Sukumar was selected as cinematographer, while Thaman S collaborated with Vijay Chander again.

Sai Pallavi was signed to play the lead actress in the project, marking her first leading role in Tamil films. She later opted out of the film and returned her advance in late February 2017, citing scheduling issues with her work on the Tamil language remake of the Malayalam film Charlie (2015) directed by A. L. Vijay. She was later replaced by Tamannaah Bhatia, who stated it was "liberating to see a strong storyline in a commercial pot-boiler". Actors Ravi Kishan, R. K. Suresh and Radha Ravi were selected to portray antagonists in the film. Actor Vishwanath, who had a breakthrough role in Pa. Ranjith's Kabali (2016), was signed on to play a supporting role in the film, with Vijay Chander requesting the actor to take reference of Kalaiyarasan's role in Madras (2014) for his particular character. Actress Sri Priyanka, previously seen as the lead actress in small budget films, was also selected to portray second lead actress in the film.

Following a period of delay, the film began its shoot at Binny Mills in Chennai during early February 2017, with Vikram choosing to simultaneously work on the project alongside his commitments for Gautham Vasudev Menon's spy thriller Dhruva Natchathiram. The film's title, Sketch, was revealed to the media in April 2017. The shoot of the film was completed in August 2017, after which the makers began the promotional campaign.

== Music ==
Sketch

Soundtrack album by Thaman S
- Released: 11 May 2015
- Genre: Film soundtrack
- Length: 24:05
- Language: Tamil
- Label: Think Music

Thaman S chronology
Golmaal Again (2017)	Sketch (2015)	Gayatri (2018)

The soundtrack and background music of Sketch are scored by Thaman S. Five songs have been released from the film as singles, after being released by other composers.

No.	Title	Lyrics	Singer(s)	Length
1.	"Kannave Kannave – The Swaga Song"	Vijay Chandar	Vikram	5:10
2.	"Atchi Putchi"	Vijay Chandar	Vijay Chandar	4:28
3.	"Cheeni Chillaallee"	Vivek	Shweta Mohan, Yazin Nizar	4:41
4.	"Vaanam Thoorammalae (Afreen Afreen)"	Kabilan	Deepak Subramaniam, Roshini and Shashaa Tirupati	6:04
5.	"Dhaadikaara"	Vivek	Thaman S, Sudha Ragunathan, Andrea Jeremiah	5:06
6.	"Dhiname Dhinanme"	Vineeth Sreenivasan	Vineeth Sreenivasan, Mukesh, Aalap Raju, Shabareesh Varma	5:22
Total length:				24:05

== Release ==
Sketch was released on 12 January 2018, during the week of Pongal and clashing with two other major releases, Thaanaa Serndha Koottam and Gulaebaghavali.

== Reception ==
Thinkal Menon of The Times of India rated the film 2.5/5 stars, stating, "A template masala film, Sketch solely relies on Vikram and works in parts." According to him, the film features Vikram in a compelling role, supported by a solid cast. However, it suffers from uneven pacing and underdeveloped romantic elements, despite its engaging fight sequences, songs, and meaningful message. Rakesh Mehar of The News Minute states, "Vikram is absolutely comfortable oozing 'local' machismo, while Tamannaah's character appears to have been inserted for visual effect." In his view, the film starts as a conventional Kollywood masala entertainer, buoyed by Vikram's charismatic performance, but ultimately disappoints with a frustrating twist and a lack of originality, making it a mediocre choice for all but the most dedicated fans.

Ashameera Aiyappan of The Indian Express gave the film 1.5/5 stars, commenting, "Just one question: why Vikram, why?" She noted that the film suffers from a mind-numbing screenplay filled with cliched tropes and an outdated portrayal of romance, leaving even Vikram's commendable performance overshadowed by the film's chaotic execution and infuriating treatment of female characters. Ananya Bhattacharya of India Today gave the film 2 out of 5 stars, remarking, "Vikram shines in this passable commercial entertainer." She noted that the film struggles with weak characterisation and an inconsistent screenplay, ultimately failing to deliver a compelling narrative despite some strong performances and a surprising climax.

Karthik Kumar of The Hindu gave the film 2 out of 5 stars, commenting, "Even Vikram can’t save this archaic action entertainer." He opined that it is a style-over-substance film that relies heavily on Vikram's star power but ultimately falters due to its cliched plot and lack of engaging content, making it one of the low points in Vikram's career. Baradwaj Rangan wrote for Film Companion, "Vijay Chandar's Vikram-starrer is a been-there-done-that story of a good-hearted thug." He felt that the film features Vikram as a vehicle repo man entangled in a formulaic narrative that struggles with character development and originality, ultimately leaving audiences underwhelmed despite a few surprising twists.
