= Amutha =

2018 psychological thriller film

- Theatrical release poster
- Directed by: P.S. Arjun
- Written by: P.S. Arjun
- Produced by: Shafeeq AKS
- Starring: Sriya Sree; Anees Shaz; Levin Simon Joseph; Ashna Sudheer; Assisi Gibson
- Cinematography: Rajesh Panangat
- Edited by: Jithin John
- Music by: Arun Gopan
- Production company: Southern Film Factory
- Release date: 16 May 2018
- Country: India
- Language: Tamil

Amutha (Tamil: அமுதா, lit. 'Lively') is a 2018 Tamil-language psychological thriller film written and directed by P.S. Arjun. It features Sriya Sree, Anees Shaz and Levin Simon Joseph in the lead. The film also features Ashna Sudheer, Shivakumar Raju, Baby Ileanor and Assisi Gibson in other important roles. The film was produced by Shafeeq under the banner Southern Film Factory. Featuring music was composed by Arun Gopan and cinematography by Rajesh Panangat. The film began production in Jan-2018.

== Cast ==
- Sriya Sree as Amutha
- Anees Shaz as Inspector Narendran
- Levin Simon Joseph as Gautham Sreenivasan
- Ashna Sudheer as Maya Sreenivasan
- Shivakumar Raju as Micheal Raj
- Assisi Gibson as Manohar
- Ilaenor as Baby Amutha
- Khais as Killer
- Nimmy Arun Gopan as Lakshmi
- Jasmine as Anusha
- Sindhu as Shyama
- Shafeeq as Kumar
- Murugan as hero
- Vignesh Dhanush

== Production ==
Arjun began writing the script of Amutha in 2016. He wrote the introduction and climax part first and then added multiple story-lines. Even though the script Amutha was initially written for Tamil, it was in discussion to be made in Malayalam with Lena as the lead character. However, the production company decided not to proceed, stating that the script contained too much violence, and this resulted in the script returning to Tamil.

Arjun had done an English short movie called Zugzwang on a budget of Rs 25,000. Sriya Sree, who dons the central character of the movie, was a part of the short movie also. It is Sriya Sree who referred Arjun's name to Shafeeq AKS. Impressed by the quality of the short movie, he went on to produce Amutha.

On the title, P. S. Arjun states, "The title-character name is inspired from the name of the lead character of Mani Ratnam's Kannathil Muthamittal. I wanted a character name, which is not common yet, quite familiar".

Arun Gopan was selected to be the music director, and G. Ra, to be the lyrics writer. He had two songs in the Telugu movie Ninnu Kori, under the music direction of Gopi Sunder. The songs were well-received and he got a lot of applause too. "The film is shot without much compromise on the technical side. It’s a great start with a fine team and an even finer movie. I love out-of-the-box concepts. I believe this film will be relished by the audience," says Arun Gopan.

== Soundtrack ==
The film's soundtrack and score were composed by Arun Gopan and the lyrics were written by G. Ra. The single "Konjam Sirikkirean" was launched by Aishwarya Rajesh on 3 September 2018. The soundtrack album consisting four tracks were released on 20 September 2018. The album received very positive response from critics and audience.

Amutha (Original Motion Picture Soundtrack)
No.	Title	Lyrics	Singer/s
1	"Konjam Sirikkirean"	G. Ra	Vineeth Sreenivasan
2	"Kanna Enthen Thaaye"	G. Ra	K. S. Chithra
3	"Kannaadi Maalai"	G. Ra	P. Jayachandran
4	"Mukilea"	Arun Gopan	Roshan
