= Onaaigal Jakkiradhai =

- Theatrical release poster
- Directed by: JPR
- Written by: JPR
- Produced by: JPR
- Starring: Kabali Vishwanth; Riythvika; Baby Amrutha
- Cinematography: Magesh K. Dev
- Edited by: Deepak
- Music by: Adheesh Uthrian
- Production company: S Bioscope Productions
- Distributed by: Karishma Infotainment
- Release date: 5 January 2018
- Running time: 125 minutes
- Country: India
- Language: Tamil

Onaaigal Jakkiradhai (transl. Beware of Wolves) is a 2018 Indian Tamil-language horror drama film written, directed and produced by JPR while music is composed by Adheesh Uthriyan. It stars Kabali Vishwanth, Riythvika, and Baby Amrutha in the lead roles. The music was composed by Addheesh Uthrian with cinematography by Magesh K. Dev and editing by Deepak. It was released on 5 January 2018 and met with negative reviews.

The film is about what unemployed youngsters do for money. Riythvika portrays a ghost in the film.

== Plot ==
Anjali (Baby Amrutha) is the only child of a rich couple (Vijay Krishnaraj and Nithya Ravindran), who was born after 16 years of their marriage. Anjali's parents raise her with much love and affection. Azhagu (Kabali Vishwanth) is Anjali's maternal uncle who roams around with his friends Chithappu (A. Venkatesh), Saravanan (Adams), and Pandi (Kasion). All four friends are badly in need of money for different reasons. Although Azhagu is fond of Anjali, he devises a plan to kidnap her and extract money from her father. As per the plan, Anjali is kidnapped and held as a hostage in an isolated bungalow where Chithappu works as a security guard. Azhagu's friends call Anjali's father and demand one crore rupees as ransom, for which he agrees. Anjali's father gives the money to Azhagu's friends and cries to Azhagu that he is even ready to give 10 crores for his daughter's sake. This makes Azhagu extract more money from Anjali's father.

Azhagu tells his friends to threaten Anjali's father by asking for an additional 3 crore rupees. Anjali's father agrees and gives the kidnappers the money. However, Azhagu is still not convinced and wants to extract more money, but his friends are against this plan and remind him of a flashback. A few months back, Azhagu and his friends kidnapped Varshini (Riythvika) with plans of extracting money from her father, but her father filed a police complaint. This angered Azhagu, and he killed Varshini, buried her body in the backyard of the same bungalow, and placed a plate given by a tantric. Now, when the four friends keep discussing among themselves in the bungalow, Anjali sees Azhagu and finds out that her uncle is behind the kidnapping. Azhagu is shocked, but his friends devise a plan to kill Anjali. Although Azhagu does not like this plan, he has no other option. Chithappu kills Anjali and buries her next to Varshini's grave in the backyard.

The four friends experience some strange events in the bungalow, and they understand that it is Anjali's soul that is haunting them, as they have not placed any tantric plate over Anjali's grave. Meanwhile, Anjali's parents worry about her whereabouts, and her father gets paralyzed. Anjali's soul threatens the friends, making them remove the tantric plate from Varshini's grave. Varshini's soul then comes out and murders all four friends.

== Cast ==
- Kabali Vishwanth as Azhagesan (Azhagu), Anjali's uncle
- Riythvika as Varshini
- Baby Amrutha as Anjali
- A. Venkatesh as Chithappu
- Adams as Saravanan
- Kasion as Pandi
- Vijay Krishnaraj as Anjali's father
- Nithya Ravindran as Anjali's mother
- Anand Kumar as Inspector
- P. Senthilkumar as Sub-Inspector
- Sathish as Constable
- Sounder as Constable
- Balamurugan as Constable
- Elango as Priest
- G. M. Rajih as Priest
- Venkat as Financier

== Reception ==
A critic from The New Indian Express wrote that "The film shows the depravity of the human soul and the depths it plumbs in pursuit of what it truly wants". The Times of India Samayam gave the film a rating of two out of five stars. The critic praised the story and criticized certain illogical dialogues.
