= K. Ganeshan =

Indian film director

- Born: Kuppan Ganeshan; Bengaluru Karnataka India
- Occupations: Film director Screenwriter; Producer; Actor
- Years active: 1993 – present
- Known for: Porkalathil Oru Poo; 18.05.2009

K. Ganeshan is an Indian film director, producer, screenwriter and actor working in Kannada, Tamil and Telugu films.

== Career ==
K.Ganeshan started his career as an assistant director, later made directorial debut with Asha Jyothi (1993), where he played lead role as well. Porkalathil Oru Poo is a banned film based on the life of Isaipriya, a journalist and television broadcaster for the rebel Liberation Tigers of Tamil Eelam. Ganeshan's other notable films are Savi Nilaya, that won Baby Mevisha Karnataka State Film Award for Best Child Actor (Female) in 2015, 18.05.2009, based on Sri Lankan Civil War, and Namma Magu that was screened at UNESCO IOM.

Ganeshan's new film is a Tamil film titled as Kadhal Sei with Ilaiyaraaja as composer. The film was dubbed in Kannada as Preethsu.

== Filmography ==
Year	Film	Language	Director	Writer	Producer	Actor	Notes
1993	Asha Jyothi	Kannada	Yes	Yes	Yes	Yes	
1998	Naane Sathya	Kannada	Yes	Yes	Yes	Yes	
2001	Maanavieyathe	Kannada	Yes	Yes	Yes		
2005	Navabharathi	Kannada	Yes	Yes	Yes		
2006	Putham Pudhusu	Tamil	Yes	Yes			
2007	Mannina Makkalu	Kannada	Yes	Yes	Yes		
2008	Miss Bharathi	Telugu	Yes	Yes			
2011	Yaare Nee Mohiniya	Kannada	Yes	Yes	Yes		
2015	Porkalathil Oru Poo	Tamil	Yes	Yes			
2015	Savi Nilaya	Kannada	Yes	Yes	Yes		
2018	18.05.2009	Tamil	Yes	Yes			
2019	Suji Pass	Kannada	Yes	Yes	Yes		
2020	Manitham	Tamil	Yes	Yes	Yes	Yes	
2020	Kasturi 5ne Tharagathi (KASTURI VTH STD)	Kannada	Yes	Yes	Yes	Yes	
2020	Namma Magu	Kannada	Yes	Yes	Yes	Yes	
2021	Bhairavi	Kannada	Yes	Yes	Yes		
2022	Kadhal Sei	Tamil	Yes	Yes			
