= 18.05.2009 =

2018 Indian Tamil language drama war film directed by K Ganeshan

- Directed by: K. Ganeshan
- Written by: K Ganeshan
- Based on: Sri Lankan Civil War
- Starring: Subash Chandra Bose; Dhaanya
- Music by: Ilaiyaraaja
- Distributed by: SSK Creations
- Release date: 18 May 2018
- Running time: 130 minutes
- Country: India
- Language: Tamil

18.05.2009 (read as 18 May 2009) is a 2018 Indian Tamil-language war drama film written and directed by K Ganeshan.The film is about the bloody end to the Sri Lankan Civil War .K Ganeshan states he believes he has the “blessings of the thousands of Tamils who were massacred by the Sri Lankan Army on May 18, 2009.” Dhaanya made her acting debut through this film which she depicted it as a difficult debut. She plays a journalist in the film.

The music for the film is composed by veteran music director Ilaiyaraaja.

== Cast ==
- Subash Chandra Bose
- Dhaanya as Tamilselvi

== Soundtrack ==
1. "Ethanai Ethanai Kodumai" - Ilaiyaraaja

== Release ==
The film was released on 18 May 2018. Actress Dhanya received death threats for acting nude in the film. Maalai Malar praised the director's intention, the performances of the film's cast, and the film's soundtrack.
