= Kadaikutty Singam =

2018 film by Pandiraj

- Theatrical release poster
- Directed by: Pandiraj
- Written by: Pandiraj
- Produced by: Suriya
- Starring: Karthi; Sayyeshaa; Sathyaraj; Bhanupriya; Arthana Binu; Priya Bhavani Shankar
- Cinematography: Velraj
- Edited by: Ruben
- Music by: D. Imman
- Production company: 2D Entertainment
- Distributed by: Sakthi Film Factory
- Release date: 13 July 2018
- Running time: 149 minutes
- Country: India
- Language: Tamil
- Budget: ₹25 crore
- Box office: est. ₹70 crore

Kadaikutty Singam (transl. The youngest lion cub) is a 2018 Indian Tamil-language action comedy drama film written and directed by Pandiraj and produced by Suriya on his studio 2D Entertainment. The film features an ensemble cast of Karthi, Sayyeshaa, Sathyaraj, Soori, Bhanupriya, Viji Chandrasekhar, Arthana Binu and Priya Bhavani Shankar. The film's music was composed by D. Imman and the cinematographer was by R. Velraj. The film was released on 13 July 2018. It won three Tamil Nadu State Film Awards: Best Film (Second Prize), Best Supporting Actress (Viji) and Best Cinematographer (Velraj).

== Plot ==
Perunazhi Gunasingam is a modern-day wealthy farmer who lives happily with his family and his father, Ranasingam.

Thirty years ago, Ranasingam always wanted a son but kept getting daughters. After four daughters with his first wife, Vanavan Madevi, Ranasingam sought a new bride to beget a son. Afraid of losing her status to a stranger, Vanavan arranged a marriage between Ranasingam and her younger sister, Panchavan Madhevi. Five months after Panchavan became pregnant, Ranasingam's eldest daughter, Mangamma Rani, became pregnant out of wedlock, and Ranasingam's family arranged her marriage to her boyfriend, Thamarai Manala Sendayar. With both the stepdaughter and stepmother pregnant, the odds went against Ranasingam as Panchavan gave birth to a girl while his elder daughter had a boy. Ranasingam was heartbroken and stopped worrying about a boy child.

8 years later, Vanavan became accidentally pregnant and finally gave birth to a boy named Gunasingam. Now Gunasingam is a 27-year-old, 10th graduate, and a contented and happy farmer who practices natural farming and lives peacefully. His concerns are:

1. His eldest sister's husband, Thamarai, and his next sister's husband, Malligai Manala Sendayar, have been at loggerheads for a decade despite being blood brothers. This is due to a court feud over inheritance. It is complicated by Malligai not being pregnant at all.

2. He must decide whether to marry either Poompozhil Chellamma (daughter of his third sister) or Aandal Priyadarshini (daughter of his only step-sister), as it is a societal norm in Tamil Nadu for a man to marry his elder sister's daughter in rural areas.

However, problems arise when Gunasingam falls head over heels for Kannukiniyal "Iniya", the daughter of a rich man, Thillainayagam, whose sister Ranasingam had suddenly left during his engagement to oversee the birth of his fourth daughter. Despite resistance from Iniya's family, Ranasingam agrees to the match, provided that Gunasingam must convince his sisters that he cannot marry their daughters. Also, Iniya's uncle, Kodiyarasu, was jailed for the work of Gunasingam and seeks to get revenge by killing him. When Chellamma learns of Gunasingam's decision, she attempts suicide but is saved.

Panchavan vacates Ranasingam's house because she feels that her elder sister continuously commits injustices against her, like arranging her marriage without her permission, getting Panchavan's only daughter married to an ill drunkard who died within a year, and now refusing to marry her granddaughter, Andal, to Gunasingam. As revenge, Kodiyarasu offers to marry Chellamma, and that offer is accepted. Thamarai is willing to attend the marriage only if his brother does not; the same goes for Malligai. Finally, Gunasingam gathers all his relatives to his grandmother's function and convinces them after a moving speech. Later, Kodiyarasu is thrashed by Gunasingam and returned to prison. Meanwhile, Gunasingam's brothers-in-law amend their dispute, and everyone attends Gunasingam's wedding to Iniya.

A year later, Gunasingam and Iniya give birth to a girl and choose to adopt permanent birth control to ensure that past events do not repeat themselves.

== Cast ==
- Karthi as Perunazhi Gunasingam (Kadaikutty Singam)
- Sathyaraj as Perunazhi Ranasingam, Gunasingam's father
- Bhanupriya as Panchavan Madhevi, Ranasingam's second wife and Vanavan Madevi's sister
- Viji Chandrasekhar as Vanavan Madevi, Ranasingam's first wife
- Soori as Sivagamiyin Selvan, Mangamma's Son
- Sayyeshaa as Kannukiniyal "Iniya", Gunasingam's love interest
- Priya Bhavani Shankar as Poompozhil "Chellamma", Samyuktha's Daughter
- Arthana Binu as "Aandal" Priyadarshini, Padmavathi's Daughter
- Saroja as Sembiyan Madevi Vaanavan Madevi and Panchavan Madevi's mother
- Mounika as Mangamma Rani (Sathi Leelavathi/Saamiyadi), Ranasingam's first daughter
- Saravanan as Thamarai Manala Sendayar, Mangamma's husband and 1st son-in-law of Ranasingam
- Deepa Shankar as Velunachiar Rani (Sandakozhi/Action King), Ranasingam's second daughter
- G. Marimuthu as Malligai Manala Sendayar, Thamarai Manala Sendayar's brother, Velunachiyar's husband and second son-in-law of Ranasingam
- Yuvarani as Samyuktha Rani (Ratha Kanneer), Ranasingam's third daughter
- Ilavarasu as Manikkam, Samyuktha's husband and third son-in-law of Ranasingam
- Jeevitha as Jhansi Rani (Ulavuthurai), Ranasingam's fourth daughter
- Sriman as Adhiyamaan Nedunkili (Safari), Jhansirani's husband and fourth son-in-law of Ranasingam
- Indhumathi as Padmavathi Rani (Paasa Malar), Ranasingam's fifth daughter born for Panchavan Madevi
- Ponvannan as Thillainayagam, Iniya's father
- Shatru as Kodiyarasu
- Manoj Kumar as Gunasingam's teacher who work as an accountant at Ranasingam's house
- John Vijay as MLA, Gunasingam's spy in enemy's gang
- Manobala as Judge
- Soundararaja as Kodimaran, Kodiyarasu's brother
- Veerasamar as Kodaiyarasu's right-hand man
- Senthi Kumari as Thillainayagam's sister
- Tanushree as Jhansi Rani's daughter
- Rithik as Jhansi Rani's son
- Thamizh as Teacher's grandson
- Krishnamoorthy as Bus conductor
- Suriya in a special appearance as himself
- Velraj in a special appearance
- Rajsekar Karpura Sundara Pandian in a special appearance

== Production ==
In June 2017, Suriya signed on director Pandiraj to make a film for his studio 2D Entertainment, which would feature Karthi in a lead role. Pandiraj revealed that Karthi would play the role of a passionate farmer and the only male child in a family with five elder sisters. The director succeeded in convincing Sathyaraj to play the character of Karthi's father, while he cast Sayyeshaa as the main female lead despite initial reservations whether she would aptly portray a village character. The makers held talks with Anupama Parameswaran for a Second leading female role, but later selected Priya Bhavani Shankar. Arthana Binu was signed to portray another leading female role. Other actors selected for the film included Soori, Bhanupriya, Yuvarani, Mounika, Viji Chandrasekhar and Ponvannan.

The shoot of the film began on 9 November 2017 in Chennai, with the cast and crew assembling for a launch ceremony. In early January 2018, the team moved to continue the shoot in Thenkasi and Puliyankudi. The film ran into trouble with Animal Welfare Board of India (AWBI) when the team shot a rekla (bullock cart race) scene sequence in spite of AWBI denying permission. The producers had previously approached the AWBI for permission to shoot the scene which involved 211 cows and oxen, 48 cocks and 32 birds. The board, however, denied permission citing that the Supreme Court has banned the sport. The breach had come to light after Suriya had uploaded a video of him and his son visiting the shoot location in Karaikudi. Rajasekar Pandian, a manager of 2D Entertainment, later said that the team got the required permission from the District Collector of Pudukottai, who permitted the president of the Rekla Federation of Tamil Nadu to conduct the race. So, the makers chose to use the opportunity of the race to include such scenes of rekla racing in the film. Filming wrapped in April 2018.

== Marketing and release ==
Karthi and Soori appeared in the reality TV series Bigg Boss Tamil 2 to promote the film. The satellite rights of the film were sold to STAR Vijay, and streaming rights to Amazon Prime Video.

== Reception ==
=== Critical response ===
Ashameera Aiyappan of The Indian Express gave the film 2.5 out of 5 stars and wrote "Kadaikutty Singam was also branded as the film that would ‘inspire’ youngsters to take up farming. In a growing trend, several films seem to bear the pressure of delivering a social message. And in the process, they tend to oversimplify social issues that are intricately layered. It is easy to call yourself a proud farmer when you earn in lakhs from harvests and belong to a family that can feed 50 people daily. Kadaikutty Singam is about Guna Singam, who happens to be a farmer and his extended family. And Pandiraj ensures that it is a family that we don't get to see often." Thinkal Menon of The Times of India gave the film 3 out of 5 stars and wrote "Karthi steals the show as a proud farmer who is hopeful of the state of agriculture in the country. As a down to earth family man, who preaches about the greatness of farming and the need to embrace it, the role has given him another chance to showcase his acting prowess. Soori's comedy comes as a relief at many places in the film which is a bit over loaded with family sentiments. The heroines are okay while Sathyaraj, Ilavarasu, Bhanupriya and other artistes play their part well. Imman's music and Velraj's cinematography enhance the storytelling at several situations, while editing could have been much better." Priyanka Sundar of Hindustan Times gave the film 2 out of 5 stars and wrote "Kadaikutty Singham is a film that set out to explore the dynamics of a joint family in a rural village in Tamil Nadu, but ended up becoming a messy affair that tried to do it all."

=== Box office ===
The film collected about ₹20 crore (US$3.12 million) in Tamil Nadu on first week. According to trade sources, the film grossed ₹37 crore (US$3.9 million) in just two weeks in Tamil Nadu and continued to run to packed houses.

== Soundtrack ==
Kadaikutty Singam

Soundtrack album by D. Imman
- Released: 11 June 2018; 16 July 2018 (Bonus Tracks)
- Recorded: 2018
- Genre: Feature film soundtrack
- Length: 34:07; 15:31 (Bonus Tracks)
- Language: Tamil
- Label: Sony Music
- Producer: D. Imman

D. Imman chronology
Tik Tik Tik (2018)	Kadaikutty Singam (2018)	Seema Raja (2018)

The soundtrack was composed by D. Imman, making his first collaboration with Karthi and director Pandiraj. The soundtrack rights were acquired by Sony Music. The album features eight songs, with three karaoke versions. The audio launch for the film was held on 11 June 2018. After the film's release, the makers released five more songs as bonus tracks on 16 July 2018.

All lyrics are written by Yugabharathi.

Track-List
No.	Title	Singer(s)	Length
1.	"Sandakkaari"	D. Imman, Vandana Srinivasan	4:30
2.	"Kaalai Theme"	Nivas, Sai Vignesh, T.S. Sarath, Narayanan, Jithin Raj, Vignesh Narayanan	3:52
3.	"Thandora Kannaala"	V. V. Prasanna	4:22
4.	"Vaa Jikki"	D. Imman	4:17
5.	"Sengathire"	Pradeep Kumar	4:02
6.	"Sandakkaari" (Karaoke)		4:30
7.	"Thandora Kannaala" (Karaoke)		4:19
8.	"Vaa Jikki" (Karaoke)		4:17
Total length:			34:07

Additional Songs
No.	Title	Lyrics	Singer(s)	Length
1.	"Sithiramaasam Veyyila"	Mahalingam	Mahalingam	1:39
2.	"Adivellakkaara Velaayi"	Mahalingam	Anthony Daasan	2:52
3.	"Vaalakola Mela"	Iravi	Madurai Lakshmi Amma	2:08
4.	"Sandakkaari" (Male Version)	Yugabharathi	D. Imman	4:30
5.	"Thandora Kannaala" (Reprise)	Yugabharathi	V.V. Prassanna	4:22
Total length:				15:31

Telugu version

Chinna Babu

Soundtrack album by D. Imman
- Released: 24 June 2018
- Recorded: 2018
- Genre: Feature film soundtrack
- Length: 34:07
- Language: Telugu
- Label: Sony Music
- Producer: D. Imman

The soundtrack album for the Telugu version Chinna Babu was released on 24 June 2018.

All lyrics are written by Vennelakanti.

Telugu Track-List
No.	Title	Singer(s)	Length
1.	"Chinnadhaani"	Haricharan, Vandana Srinivasan	4:29
2.	"Githa Theme"	Santosh Hariharan, Sai Vignesh, T.S. Sarath Santhosh, Narayanan Ravishankar, Jithin Raj, Vignesh Narayanan	3:52
3.	"Theeyanga"	Sathya Prakash	4:22
4.	"Ra Chinna Ra Chinna"	Hemachandra	4:17
5.	"Aakaasama"	Haricharan	4:02
6.	"Chinnadhaani" (Karaoke)		4:29
7.	"Theeyanga" (Karaoke)		4:19
8.	"Ra Chinna Ra Chinna" (Karaoke)		4:17
Total length:			34:07

== Accolades ==
Date of ceremony	Award	Category	Recipient(s) and nominee(s)	Result	Ref.
5 January 2019	Ananda Vikatan Cinema Awards	Best Popular Film	2D Entertainment	Won	
16 August 2019	8th South Indian International Movie Awards	Best Actor	Karthi	Nominated	
16 August 2019	8th South Indian International Movie Awards	Best Comedian	Soori	Nominated	
16 August 2019	8th South Indian International Movie Awards	Best Film	2D Entertainment	Nominated	
16 August 2019	8th South Indian International Movie Awards	Best Director	Pandiraj	Won	
