= Semma =

2018 Indian movie

- Theatrical release poster
- Directed by: Vallikanthan
- Written by: Vallikanthan; Pandiraj (dialogues)
- Produced by: Pandiraj
- Starring: G. V. Prakash Kumar; Arthana Binu
- Cinematography: Vivekanand Santhosham
- Edited by: Pradeep E. Ragav
- Music by: G. V. Prakash Kumar
- Production companies: Linga Bhairavi Creations; Pasanga Productions
- Release date: 25 May 2018
- Running time: 120 minutes
- Country: India
- Language: Tamil

Semma (transl. Awesome) is a 2018 Indian Tamil language action comedy film directed by Vallikanth and written by Pandiraj. The film stars G. V. Prakash Kumar and Arthana Binu, while Yogi Babu and Mansoor Ali Khan play supporting roles. Featuring music also composed by Prakash Kumar and cinematography by Vivekanand Santhosham, the film began production during early 2017 and released on 25 May 2018 to mixed reviews. It was later dubbed into Telugu as Chinni Krishnudu.

== Plot ==
Kuzhandhai has to get married within the next three months as per his horoscope, and he is engaged to Magizhini. Problems arise before their marriage in the form of Magizhini's father 'Attack' Balu, and their wedding becomes a question mark. Does Kuzhandhai get married within that stipulated time and does he marry Magizhini is what Semma is all about.

== Cast ==
- G. V. Prakash Kumar as Kulandaivelu
- Arthana Binu as Magizhini
- Yogi Babu as Omagundam, Kulandai's friend
- Kovai Sarala as Mandhaarai, Magizhini's mother
- Mansoor Ali Khan as 'Attack' Balu, Magizhini's father
- Sujatha Sivakumar as Aravalli, Kulanadaivelu's mother
- Gayatri Rema as Gayatri
- Jana as Gemini Ganesan
- Deepa Shankar as Muthupechi
- Assisi Gibson as Tony

== Production ==
In early 2016, director Pandiraj and G. V. Prakash Kumar discussed the idea of making a sequel to the director's successful comedy film, Kedi Billa Killadi Ranga (2013). The pair then agreed in principle to make the film, with Rajkiran and Sathyaraj considered for supporting roles, before the plan was put on hold. Subsequently, Pandiraj and Prakash Kumar chose to start another project, where Pandiraj would work as the dialogue writer in his assistant Vallikanth's script. The film began production in early 2017 and developed quietly, before a press release in March 2017 revealed that the film was titled Semma and had completed its shoot. Calling the film a "full length comedy", Pandiraj revealed that the film was based on a real life incident which happened at the wedding of director Vallikanth's friend. Actress Arthana Binu and actor Jana were introduced to the Tamil film industry with the project, while a bevy of supporting actors including Yogi Babu, Kovai Sarala and Sujatha Sivakumar were stated to have worked on the film during schedules held in Chennai and Trichy.

== Soundtrack ==
The soundtrack was composed by G. V. Prakash Kumar.

Semma

Soundtrack album by G. V. Prakash Kumar
- Released: 2018
- Genre: Film soundtrack
- Length: 21:34
- Label: Think Music India
- Producer: G. V. Prakash Kumar

G. V. Prakash Kumar chronology
Lens (2017)	Semma (2018)	Kuppathu Raja (2019)

Track listing
No.	Title	Lyrics	Singer(s)	Length
1.	"Sandalee"	Yugabharathi	Velmurugan, V. M. Mahalingam	5:23
2.	"Uruttu Kannala"	Ekadesi	Santosh Hariharan, M. M. Monisha	4:05
3.	"Nenje Nenje"	Yugabharathi	Siddharth Mahadevan, Shashaa Tirupati	3:40
4.	"Sema (Theme)"		Adhik Ravichandran, Thirumurthy	1:20
5.	"Vechu Senjachu"	Arunraja Kamaraj	Adhik Ravichandran, Rajaganapathy	4:05
Total length:				21:34
