= Vanmurai Paguthi =

Indian Tamil-language action drama film

- Theatrical release poster
- Directed by: Nagaraj
- Starring: Manikandan; NSKJ Manogara; Raja; Rafia Jaffer
- Music by: Songs: Punithan; Score: Christy
- Production company: Madurai Meenakshi Creations
- Release date: 2 November 2018
- Country: India
- Language: Tamil

Vanmurai Paguthi (transl. Violent area) is a 2018 Indian Tamil-language action drama film directed by Nagaraj and starring Manikandan, NSKJ Manogara, Raja, and Rafia Jaffer.

== Cast ==
- Manikandan as Muniyasamy
- NSKJ Manogara as Sannasi
- Raja as Velu
- Rafia Jaffer as Thavamani
- Dindigul Dhanam as Chinnathai
- Mujeed as Manickam
- Marichelvam as Paramasivan
- Theni MSP Rajendran as Thavamani's uncle
- Sivaraman as Sivaraman

== Soundtrack ==
The songs were composed by Punithan, written by Nagaraj and sung by R Arul Pragasam and Soniya. The soundtrack features two songs "Thodangiruchu" and "Sathigaariye".

== Reception ==
Arunkumar Shekar of The New Indian Express wrote, "With a better cast, with lowered voices and a more focused screenplay, Vanmurai Paguthi could have been what it teases to be at various points: A study of violence at a domestic and psychological level". Anupama Subramanian of Deccan Chronicle wrote, "A more rehearsed cast and improved character development would have made this a regional hit". A critic from Maalai Malar wrote that although it is a story that we are used to seeing in Tamil cinema, the difference is noticeable because director Nagaraj has shot it realistically without any cinematic pretensions. A critic from News Today wrote, "Vanurai Paguthi is like any other central Tamil Nadu films, but unlike them , it has a purpose which is delivered well on a strong narration".
