= Vijay Chandar =

Indian film director

- Occupations: Director; producer
- Years active: 2015—present

Vijay Chandar is an Indian film director and producer known for Tamil-language film Vaalu (2015).

== Career ==
Vijay Chandar made his directorial debut with Vaalu (2015). The film began production in 2012 and released in 2015 after much delay. The reason for the delay was the break after the first schedule. Chandar's next film was Sketch (2018) starring Vikram. The film was an average success. His next film was Sangathamizhan (2019) with Vijay Sethupathi.

== Filmography ==
List of film credits
Year	Film	Director	Writer	Producer	Notes
2015	Vaalu	Yes	Yes	No	
2018	Sketch	Yes	Yes	No	Also lyricist, singer and actor in the song "Atchi Putchi"
2019	Sangathamizhan	Yes	Yes	No	
2024	Guardian	No	No	Yes	
