= Vaalu =

2015 Indian film by Vijay Chandar

- Theatrical release poster
- Directed by: Vijay Chandar
- Written by: Vijay Chandar
- Produced by: S. S. Chakravarthy
- Starring: Silambarasan; Hansika Motwani
- Cinematography: Shakthi
- Edited by: T. S. Suresh
- Music by: Thaman S
- Production company: NIC Arts
- Distributed by: Simbhu Cine Arts
- Release date: 14 August 2015
- Running time: 158 minutes
- Country: India
- Language: Tamil

Vaalu (transl. Tail/Mischief Maker) is a 2015 Indian Tamil-language romantic action comedy film written and directed by debutante Vijay Chandar. The film stars Silambarasan and Hansika Motwani, with Santhanam, VTV Ganesh and Brahmanandam portraying supporting roles. The film was produced by S. S. Chakravarthy under the banner NIC Arts. S. Thaman composed the music while Sakthi and T. S. Suresh handled the cinematography and editing respectively.

The film's production began on 6 June 2012 in Chennai and lasted until June 2015. The film was predominantly shot in Chennai, with the portions of the film also shot at Hyderabad, Bangalore and Bangkok. After facing multiple delays, the film was released worldwide on 14 August 2015. The film is loosely adapted into the 2016 Kannada film Santhu Straight Forward.

== Plot ==
Sharp aka Vaalu is a carefree, jobless youth leading a life without any worry in the world. He falls in love with Priya after seeing her in the rain at a bus stop. Priya has a maternal uncle Anbu, a powerful businessman, whom she is set to marry to fulfill her parents' wishes. The rest of the film deals with Sharp winning over Priya.

== Cast ==
- Silambarasan as Shakthi "Sharp"
- Hansika Motwani as Priya Mahalakshmi "Priya"
- Santhanam as Kribakaran "Tyre"
- VTV Ganesh as Kutti Paiyaa
- Brahmanandam as MD
- Aditya as Anbu
- Manthra as Mrs. Steven
- Aadukalam Naren as Devaraj, Shakthi's father
- Sriranjani as Shakthi's mother
- Mahadevan as Priya's father
- Misha Ghoshal as Priya's friend
- Namo Narayana
- Sanjana Sarathy as Shakthi's sister
- Thangadurai as Sathish (Shakthi's friend)
- Sai Dheena as Dheena, Anbu's henchman
- Archana Mariyappan as Counselor's wife
- Munnar Ramesh
- Cool Suresh
- Ravi Venkatraman
- Senrayan
- Jai in a special appearance
- Vijay Chandar in a special appearance in "Thaaru Maaru"
- Sandy in a special appearance in "Thaaru Maaru"

== Production ==
=== Development ===
Vaalu was initially announced as Vijay Chandar's directorial debut in September 2010, and that actor Jai would in the lead role, but the project did not take off. Silambarasan was later impressed with Chandar's script and approached producer S. S. Chakravarthy, who he was working with in Vettai Mannan, to fund the project. Hansika Motwani, Santhanam and VTV Ganesh were later picked to portrayal pivotal roles in the film. Thaman was signed to compose the film's music, while Shakthi was selected to be the film's cinematographer. Kannada actor Audithya was added to the cast to make his debut in Tamil films, after the producers were impressed with his performance in the Kannada film, Villain (2012). Aadukalam Naren and Sriranjani were selected to play Silambarasan's parents, with Naren portraying a railway employee. Actor Jai, who had simultaneously worked with Silambarasan on Vettai Mannan, was reported to have joined the cast to play a cameo role in August 2012.

=== Filming ===
Prior to the shoot, the makers chose to film a promotional teaser featuring Silambarasan, Motwani, Santhanam and VTV Ganesh. The cinematographer Shakthi and photographer Venket Ram were involved in the making of the teaser in Taramani during May 2012. The film's first teaser was subsequently released on 6 June 2012, with an initial release date of Diwali 2012 announced. On the same day, the team began their first schedule with Silambarasan and Motwani in Chennai, with large crowds of onlookers observing the team during a shoot in Triplicane. For a particular set of the lead character's home in the film, three different locations in Chennai were combined to show a single spot. A house near Pachaiyappa's College campus, Aachi house in T Nagar and a house in Royapettah were represented as a single building. The film's art director, Ilaiyaraaja also organised sets to be designed in Ayanavaram and Perambur, to depict a railway backdrop. A wedding scene of Hansika's friend was also then shot on the campus of Panimalar Engineering College during June 2012. The team moved to Mumbai to film scenes in August 2012, and the director and editor re-worked scenes as the shoot progressed. A second schedule began in Hyderabad later that month, with Silambarasan working on the film alongside his commitments to finish Podaa Podi (2012). As Podaa Podi had been in production since 2008, Silambarasan opted to prioritise finishing that venture and Vaalu was temporarily put on hold.

In January 2013, director Chandar revealed that only eight scenes and four songs were remaining to be shot, and that the delay of the film had meant that Vincent had replaced Shakthi as cinematographer. A few scenes were shot at Ramoji Film City in February 2013, but the production of the film encountered delays throughout 2013 as Motwani and Santhanam became busy with other film projects, and another schedule only re-began in July 2013 in Hyderabad. Action sequences involving Silambarasan were shot under the instructions of stunt choreographer Kanal Kannan. Ilaiyaraaja erected a set at Lingampalli Railway Station, Hyderabad to portray a bomb blast in the film, with the lead pair and Audithya involved in the shoot. In October 2013, Silambarasan was involved in the shoot of the opening song of the film in Binny Mills, Perambur. The shoot lasted four days and the song was choreographed by Sathish Krishnan, after which the team revealed "seventy-five" percent of the film was complete. The continuous delays of the films had arisen as a result of the practical problems of gathering all the artistes and had been hampered further by Chakravarthy's financial problems. During the period, Silambarasan had threatened to distance himself from the producer, after both of his films, Vaalu and Vettai Mannan had effectively become stuck.

Sequences featuring Silambarasan and Santhanam were shot near the Accord Hotel in Chennai in February 2014, as remaining talkie portions were being completed. The team announced that another song was completed after a shoot in Bangalore, while the team travelled to Bangkok for a further song choreographed by Satish. Following the shoot, the director revealed that Vaalu was complete after two years of filming. Talking about the film's delays, actress Motwani cited that she had initially agreed to work on the film for sixty days, but had been forced to extend her call sheet by a further eighty days. She also revealed that the team often failed to keep up with schedules and had regularly wasted her dates, prompting her to prioritise other projects instead. The producer later revealed that the shoot of one song was pending, and that he intended to complete it, despite Silambarasan moving on to prioritise his work for another long-delayed project Idhu Namma Aalu (2016). Reports in November 2014 suggested that actresses from four different generations would feature in the song and that Saroja Devi, Khushbu, Meena, Simran and Nayantara were amongst those approached to be a part of the shoot. Delays and time constraints meant that the song was not shot and was left out of the film's final version. The team reconvened to shoot the song with Motwani instead in June 2015, scrapping earlier plans of including several actresses. Silambarasan continued dubbing work for the film in midnight sessions in November 2014, as the team aimed to release before the end of the year.

Due to the protracted filming schedules, continuity errors are present in the physique and styling of Motwani and Silambarasan. Motwani appears plump in the initially filmed scenes, and thin in the later filmed ones.

=== Litigation ===
In September 2012, the producers of Vaalu were involved in a legal tussle with the makers of another film who had claimed that they had registered the title first. Chandar stated that he had registered the title in 2008, and thus held the rights to use the title. The other film was later christened as Rettai Vaalu and also had a delayed release in September 2014. Cinematographer Shakthi had also threatened legal action against the producers in January 2013 after leaving the project owing to its delays. He claimed that his name was not credited in the film's posters, despite having shot "seventy percent" of the film and lodged a complaint to the cinematographers' union. Delays had meant that along with Shakthi, seven other cinematographers had been utilised by the team to film scenes. Velraj, Vetri, Dinesh Krishnan, Rahul Dharuman, Vincent Arul, Sukumar and Gurudev were all involved in the making of the film.

In July 2015, after the producers had announced a preliminary release date of 17 July, the Madras High Court issued an interim ban on the film. Film distribution company Magnum Rays had alleged that they had agreed a deal in principle with NIC Arts to distribute the film across Tamil Nadu in 2013, and that the intervention of T. Rajendar's Simbu Cine Arts thus bypassed the old agreement. The team subsequently managed to amicably sort out the issue.

== Soundtrack ==
Vaalu

Soundtrack album Vaalu by S. Thaman
- Released: 14 August 2015
- Recorded: 2012
- Genre: Feature film soundtrack
- Language: Tamil
- Labels: Think Music; Nic Audio
- Producer: S. Thaman

S. Thaman chronology
Damaal Dumeel (2014)	Vaalu (2015)	Rabhasa (2014)

The music of Vaalu was composed by S. Thaman, with lyrics written by Silambarasan and Madhan Karky. A single track titled "Love Endravan" was released on 14 February 2013. Prior to official release, the film's songs were leaked online during March 2014. The song "You're My Darling" was remade into the song "Ye Pilla Pilla" for the 2015 Telugu movie, Pandaga Chesko, which also had music by Thaman.

No.	Title	Lyrics	Singer(s)	Length
1.	"Engathaan Porandha"	Silambarasan	Silambarasan	5:13
2.	"Hey Vasamoakka"	Madhan Karky	Anirudh Ravichander, Andrea Jeremiah	3:51
3.	"You're My Darling"	Madhan Karky	S. Thaman	4:37
4.	"Love Endravan Nee Yaruda"	Silambarasan	Silambarasan	4:47
5.	"Tharumaaru"	Madhan Karky	T. Rajendar, Priyadarshini	5:18

== Release ==
The film's first teaser, released in June 2012, announced that Vaalu would have a theatrical release during the Diwali season of 2012. However the impending release of Silambarasan's other long-delayed project Podaa Podi (2012) meant that the makers decided to postpone the release of the film until January 2013. The date was also missed and by July 2013, the producers indicated that the film may release on either 15 August or during the Vinayagar Chaturthi and Diwali season of 2013, though yet again, the film remained incomplete. In January 2014, the director had stated that the film would release on 1 May 2014, though portions remained incomplete owing to scheduling problems and the film was delayed further. Evading further release dates in November 2014, Silambarasan announced that the film would finally release during Christmas 2014 and promotions for the film began. However several other films had also secured screens for 25 December, and the makers were not willing to compromise for a limited release.

After the film backed out of a Christmas 2014 release, a preliminary date of 3 February 2015 was set, to coincide with Silambarasan's birthday. The film had a private screening in early March 2015 for members of the cast and crew's family, and was given a "U" certificate from the censor board. The film experienced further delays and after a potential release date of 27 March had also been postponed to 1 May, Silambarasan made an emotional appeal calling for the quick release of the venture. The team then began promotions through posters for a release on 9 May, which was also later cancelled. Frustrated with the constant delays, Silambarasan's father T. Rajendar bought the distribution rights of the film from S. S. Chakravarthy and pledged to release it under his own Chimbu Cine Arts banner.

In June 2015, Silambarasan announced a release date of 26 June 2015, delaying the film from 12 June. The film had been postponed two weeks to avoid a clash with Santhanam's production Inimey Ippadithan (2015). A final trailer was released in late June 2015, stating that the film would release on 17 July 2015. Shortly before the scheduled release, the Madras High Court granted interim injunction against the release following a petition filed by Magic Rays, who had claimed that Vaalu's distribution rights had been sold to them in 2013. The case was cleared on 6 August and the film eventually released on 14 August 2015.

== Critical reception ==
The Times of India gave the film 3 stars out of 5 and wrote, "debutant director Vijay Chander makes his intentions clear; we are in for an anything-goes movie whose only aim is to keep the fans entertained. This is not necessarily a bad thing and Vaalu ends up as a reasonably enjoyable film", while adding that "the film is too long and at times, Vijay Chander overdoes things". The Hindu wrote, "Vaalu is tedious and trite. However, that you can sit through it at all is a mark of STR's screen presence." Sify wrote, "Vaalu is yet another romantic action entertainer which is watchable just for STR's energetic screen presence and his comic chemistry with Santhanam", going on to call it "average". Rediff gave the film 2 stars out of 5 and wrote, "Vaalu is your regular commercial entertainer with a weak plot, poor execution, unrealistic action and some mindless fun."
