= Arthana Binu =

Indian actress

- Born: Thiruvananthapuram, Kerala, India
- Education: Mass Communication and Video Production
- Alma mater: Mar Ivanios College, Thiruvananthapuram
- Occupations: Actress; TV presenter; model
- Years active: 2016–present
- Parent: Vijayakumar (father)

Arthana Binu is an Indian actress who works in Tamil, Malayalam, and Telugu film industries. Coming from Thiruvananthapuram, Kerala, she made her debut in the 2016 Telugu film Seethamma Andalu Ramayya Sitralu. She is known for films such as Mudhugauv (2016), Thondan (2017), Semma (2018) and Kadaikutty Singam (2018).

== Early life ==
Arthana born as the daughter of actor Vijayakumar and Binu Daniel. The couple later got divorced. After completing her school life, she joined Bachelor of Journalism, Mass Communication and Video Production at Mar Ivanios College, Thiruvananthapuram.

== Career ==
Arthana made her acting debut in 2016 when she was in her second year of college, in the Telugu romantic comedy film Seethamma Andalu Ramayya Sitralu (2016) along with Raj Tarun, directed by Srinivas Gavireddy. In the same year she made her Malayalam debut along with Gokul Suresh in Mudhugauv (2016), a Malayalam caper-comedy film.

Then she entered into Tamil Film Industry by Thondan (2017) directed by Samuthirakani, along with Vikranth, Samuthirakani and Sunaina. Continued by Semma (2018) which she had signed before Thondan, with G. V. Prakash Kumar under director Pandiraj's Production, got released on 25 May 2018 and Arthana got positive reviews for her performance. After watching the movie director Pandiraj castes her in his next directorial venture with Karthi in the Tamil family drama film Kadaikutty Singam (2018).

Currently she is doing as female lead in Vennila Kabaddi Kuzhu 2 Tamil action sports drama film directed by Selva Sekaran and written by director Suseenthiran, a sequel to successful 2009 film Vennila Kabadi Kuzhu.

== Filmography ==
Year	Film	Role	Language(s)	Notes	Ref.
2016	Seethamma Andalu Ramayya Sitralu	Seetha Mahalakshmi	Telugu	Telugu Debut	
2016	Mudhugauv	Ganga	Malayalam	Malayalam Debut	
2017	Thondan	Mahishasuramardini	Tamil	Tamil Debut	
2018	Semma	Magizhini	Tamil		
2018	Kadaikutty Singam	Aandal Priyadharshini	Tamil		
2019	Vennila Kabaddi Kuzhu 2	Malar	Tamil		
2020	Shylock	Poonkuzhali	Malayalam		
2024	Anweshippin Kandethum	Sridevi	Malayalam		
2024	Vasco Da Gama	Lakshana	Tamil		
2026	Couple Friendly	Shailu	Telugu	Uncredited cameo	
