= Sridhar Reddy =

Indian dentist and social activist

Dr Sridhar Reddy Arumalla
- Born: 21 December 1967 (age 58); Hyderabad, India
- Education: Govt. Dental College, Hyderabad
- Occupation: Chairman of Dr. Sridhar International Dental Hospitals Hyderabad
- Known for: Dentist, Social Activist.

Dr. Sridhar Reddy Arumalla is an Indian dentist and a Social Activist. He is the Chairman of Sri Krishna Chaitanya Vidyavihar Street Children Trust, a non-governmental organization. He along with his team has worked in the areas of rehabilitating orphaned and underprivileged children.

== Early life ==
Sridhar Reddy was born on 21 December 1967, to Vemana Reddy and Lakshmi Rajyam in Hyderabad. He did his B.D.S from Government Dental College, Hyderabad and completed Master of Dental Surgery at Bapuji Dental College, Davanagere in 1992. He worked two years at Siddhartha Dental College, Tumkur

== Career ==
Sridhar Reddy is a dentist by profession. At first, he worked for Dr. C. Chanasekaran, Maxillofacial Surgeon on an honorary basis, without salary for a year. Later in 1995, he started his own clinic "Sridhar Super Specialty Dental Clinic".

In 2006, he started his multispecialty dental hospital "Dr. Sridhar International Dental Hospital & Research Centre" inaugurated by then Chief Minister Y. S. Rajasekhara Reddy

He also holds the position of the Chairman of Indian Red Cross Society, Krishna District.

== Social Policy ==
- Sridhar Reddy runs a mobile dental facility which conducts free dental camps for the children in Government Schools, Orphans and Street Children.
- His NGO - SKCV Children's Home are run in three campuses. SKCV has given Railway Childline Project in Vijayawada. The children picked up from Railway Station are taken care by giving counseling, education, and vocational skills.

=== Professional achievements ===
- Introduced Radiovisiography, Intraoral Camera, Multipurpose Laser Treatments, and Blue Cam Technology in India.
- Under Eenaadu Sukhibhava programme, he conducted free surgery for children with cleft lip.
- Recognized by the Journal of Maxillofacial and Oral surgeon in India.

=== Social services ===
In 2009, Sridhar Reddy extended relief for families during Krishna River Floods. His team provided food and provisions to Hudhud Cyclone victims and built a causeway to an island village, Edlanka, in Krishna River.

With the help of Canadian Red Cross, he conducted Disaster Risk Reduction training in villages. He organized Tiranga Unity Blood Donation Camp to pay tributes to the martyrs of Mumbai terror attacks.

== Awards and honors ==
- Gold Medal from Shri Pranab Mukherjee, President of India, 2016.
- National Level Certificate of Merit from Union Health Minister, Sri Jagat Prakash Nadda 2014.
- Dentist of the Year Award for the years 2015 and 2016 from International Dental Journal FAMDENT.
- Red Cross Excellency Award from Andhra Pradesh Governor.
- Outstanding Service to the public during Natural Disaster Award.
