= Riythvika =

Indian actress

Riythvika Panneerselvam
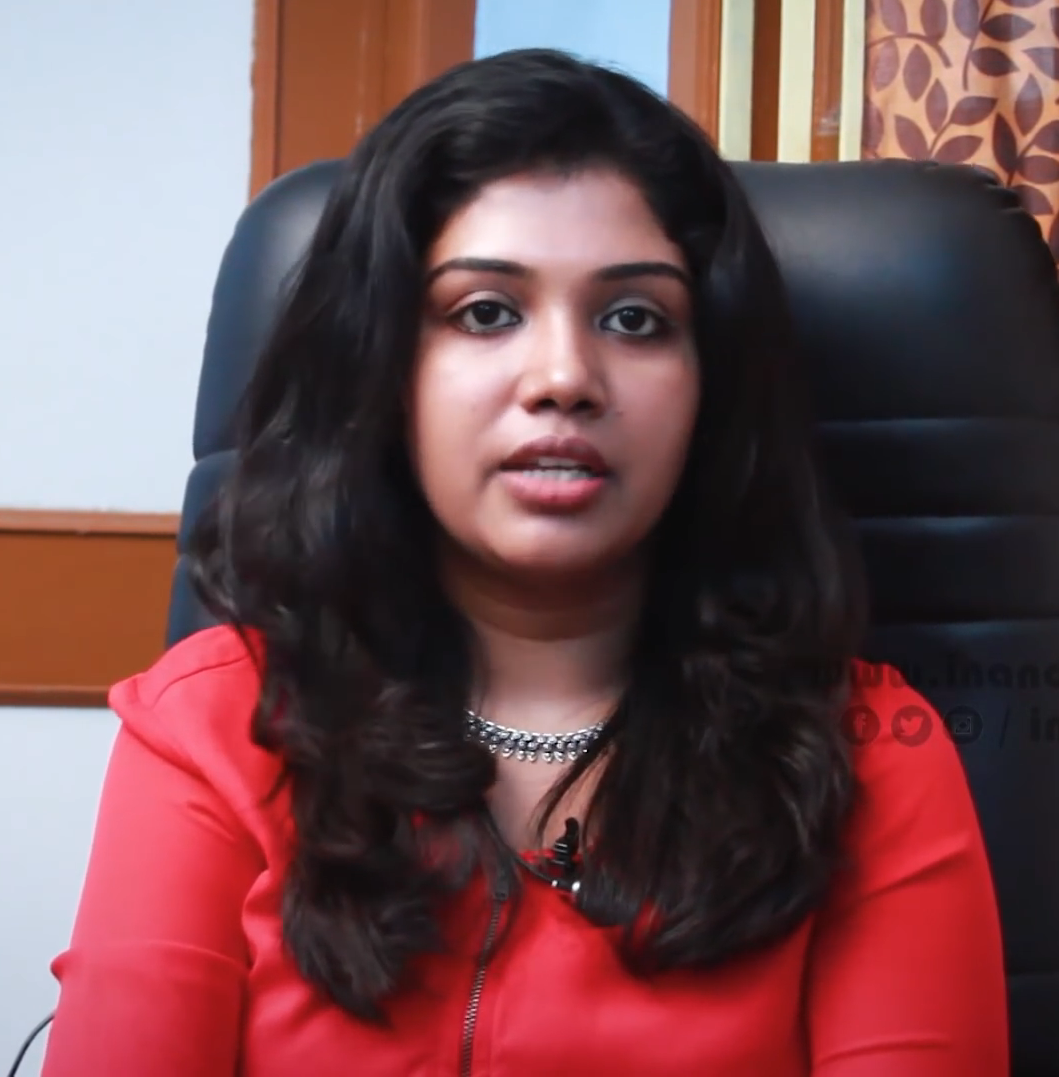
- Riythvika in 2017
- Born: Chennai, Tamil Nadu, India
- Years active: 2013–present
- Spouse: Vinoth Lakshmanan (m. 2025)

Riythvika Panneerselvam is an Indian actress who appears in supporting roles in Tamil films. In 2018, she participated in the show Bigg Boss 2 and emerged as the winner.

== Personal life ==
Riythvika Panneerselvam studied at Justice Basheer Ahmed Sayeed College for Women (SIET) in Teynampet, Chennai. She has stated that she had always dreamt of acting in films and that she used to act out scenes and reel out dialogues from films as a child. While studying at SIET, she acted in a number of short films and sent her photos to film PROs, trying for an entry into the cinema industry.

== Career ==
=== 2013–2016: Debut and breakthrough with Madras ===
During that period, director Bala was casting for his next project, Paradesi (2013), an adaptation of the English novel Red Tea (1969), which delves into the plight of tea plantation workers in the Madras Presidency during the British Raj. After going through a couple of auditions, she was selected to play the role of Karuthakanni, a young woman who gets tortured and sexually exploited in the plantations. She went on to act in Vikraman's romance film Ninaithathu Yaaro (2014) before being chosen by Pa. Ranjith for Madras (2014) to play a pivotal supporting role opposite Kalaiyarasan. Her portrayal of a North Chennai girl was lauded by critics and she won the Filmfare Award for Best Supporting Actress – Tamil besides several other nominations.

The success of Madras prompted Ranjith and other film-makers to often cast her as a girl from a lower socio-economic background. In this trend, she notably appeared as a drug addict in Kabali (2016), and as a prostitute in Iru Mugan (2016),Torchlight (2018) and Sigai (2019). In other assignments during the period, she featured as a liberal radio jockey in Oru Naal Koothu (2016), and as a ghost in the horror comedy, Onaaigal Jakkiradhai (2018).

=== 2018–present ===
In 2018, Riythvika appeared in the reality show Bigg Boss Tamil 2 as a contestant, and later emerged as the winner of the 2nd season in the franchise. She also appeared in the film Torchlight (2018) playing a crucial role in the film alongside actress Sadha.

In 2019, Rythvika, plays as an activist and journalist in Irandam Ulagaporin Kadaisi Gundu. She was seen in the cop drama Walter (2020), starring Sibiraj in the lead role. Riythvika gave a notable performance in the film, and the movie received positive reviews. In 2022, she was seen in Sila Nerangalil Sila Manidhargal followed by Cadaver and Aadhaar. In 2024, she has starred in the dramas film Yaavarum Vallavare and Deepavali Bonus.

== Filmography ==
- All films are in Tamil, unless otherwise noted.

†	Denotes films that have not yet been released

=== Films ===
Year	Title	Role(s)	Notes
2013	Paradesi	Karuthakanni	
2013	Sandhithathum Sindhithathum	Kumaresan's sister	
2014	Ninaithathu Yaaro	Thenmozhi	
2014	Madras	Mary	Filmfare Award for Best Supporting Actress – Tamil; Nominated, SIIMA Award for Best Actress in a Supporting Role; Nominated, Vijay Award for Best Supporting Actress
2016	Azhagu Kutti Chellam	Saravanan's wife	
2016	Anjala	Anjala	
2016	Oru Naal Koothu	Susheela	
2016	Kabali	Meena	
2016	Enakku Veru Engum Kilaigal Kidayathu	Dhivya	
2016	Iru Mugan	Kidnapped girl	Cameo appearance
2018	Onaaigal Jakkiradhai	Anjali	
2018	Torchlight	Kavitha	
2019	Sigai	Bhuvana	direct-to-video released on ZEE5
2019	Nethra	Jessie	
2019	Irandam Ulagaporin Kadaisi Gundu	Tanya	
2020	Walter	Padmavathi	
2021	4 Sorry	Selvi	Anthology film; third segment
2022	Sila Nerangalil Sila Manidhargal	Kayal	
2022	Cadaver	Priya	
2022	Aadhaar	Thulasi	
2023	Yaadhum Oore Yaavarum Kelir	Kannigai	
2023	800	Angammal	
2023	Odavum Mudiyadhu Oliyavum Mudiyadhu	Geetha	
2024	Yaavarum Vallavare	Revathy	
2024	Deepavali Bonus	Geetha	
2025	Eleven	Meera, Tara	Dual roles Simultaneously shot in Telugu
2025	DNA	Dr. Punithavathi Rajasekhar	
2025	Thandakaaranyam	Devi	
2026	The Dark Heaven		

=== Television ===
Year	Title	Role	TV Channel	Notes
2018	Bigg Boss 2	Contestant	Star Vijay	Winner
2019	Bigg Boss 3	Guest	Star Vijay	To promote her film Irandaam Ulagaporin Kadaisi Kundu
2019	Bigg Boss 3	Guest	Star Vijay	To introduce the Bigg Boss Trophy and to escort Sherin as she finished fourth
2019	Vanakkam Tamizha	Guest	Sun TV	
2020	Ananda Vikatan Cinema Awards	Guest	Sun TV	
2022	Thavamai Thavamirundhu	Lawyer Eswari	Zee Tamil	Guest Appearance

=== Web series ===
Year	Title	Role	Platform	Notes
2019	Madras Meter Show	Guest	ZEE5	Episode 4
2021	Navarasa	Anbu	Netflix	

Preceded by Arav	Bigg Boss Tamil Winner (Series 2) 2018	Succeeded by Mugen Rao
