= X Videos (film) =

2018 Indian crime thriller film

- Theatrical release poster
- Directed by: Sajo Sundar
- Written by: Sajo Sundar
- Starring: Akruti Singh; Prasanna Shetty; Riyamikka; Ajay Raj; Abhenav Mahajit; Praboojit; Shan
- Edited by: K. Anandha Lingakumar
- Music by: Johan
- Production company: Colour Shadows Entertainment
- Release date: 1 June 2018 (Tamil)
- Running time: 108 minutes
- Country: India
- Language: Tamil

X Videos is a 2018 Indian Tamil cyber crime thriller drama film directed by Sajo Sundar, which is also his directorial debut. Inspired by the real life hidden-cam pornography cases, the film depicts social awareness and cautions against such dirty works. It was released on 1 June 2018 in Tamil. Based on its content and subject, the film was given an A certificate.

== Plot ==
Manoj, a journalist, sets out to find out an answer for the question "Is there any use of the porn industry to the country"? He tries to find out the opinion of the common people on porn websites and ends up in a big jolt and shock about his findings. In this research, he happens to see a naked video of the wife of his friend Ankith on a pornographic website. When Manoj shares this information, Ankith kills himself in shame. Manoj begins his secret investigation on how could a personal video get posted online. Along with Daniel, his fellow journalist, and his buddy Sub-Inspector Imran, he gets deep into this. In this investigation, they find out that it was Vikram and his associates who operate the porn websites and their various ways and means of collecting the videos. Though Manoj writes about Vikram in his magazine with proper evidence, Vikram escapes with an anticipatory bail. How Manoj and Imran trap Vikram and if Vikram and his associates get caught and brought to justice forms the rest of the story.

== Cast ==
- Akruti Singh
- Prasanna Shetty
- Riyamikka
- Ajay Raj
- Abhenav Mahajit
- Praboojit
- Shan

== Production ==
This movie is the first production of Colour Shadows Entertainment and this production unit is a result of like minded friends coming together, to produce social awareness films and handle controversial subjects. The film was shot in Tamil and Hindi simultaneously.

The film's idea was conceived by the director Sajo Sundar when one day he found a video clip on the internet which featured his close friend's wife fully naked. Shocked by this incident he further researched about the world of hidden camera pornography and discovered that there were many more of such cases, sometimes that had led to the suicide of the affected person. He decided to direct a social awareness movie which would warn men and women about the risk of saving their personal videos on their mobiles. He wanted to reveal the mafia behind such crimes and how they made money in crores by doing so.

== Reception ==
A critic from The Times of India rated the film 2.5/5 and wrote that "Despite being a film on the flourishing porn industry, and with scope to add explicit, ‘X’-rated scenes, it's commendable how Sajo has kept the content 'clean'".
