= Tamannaah Bhatia filmography =

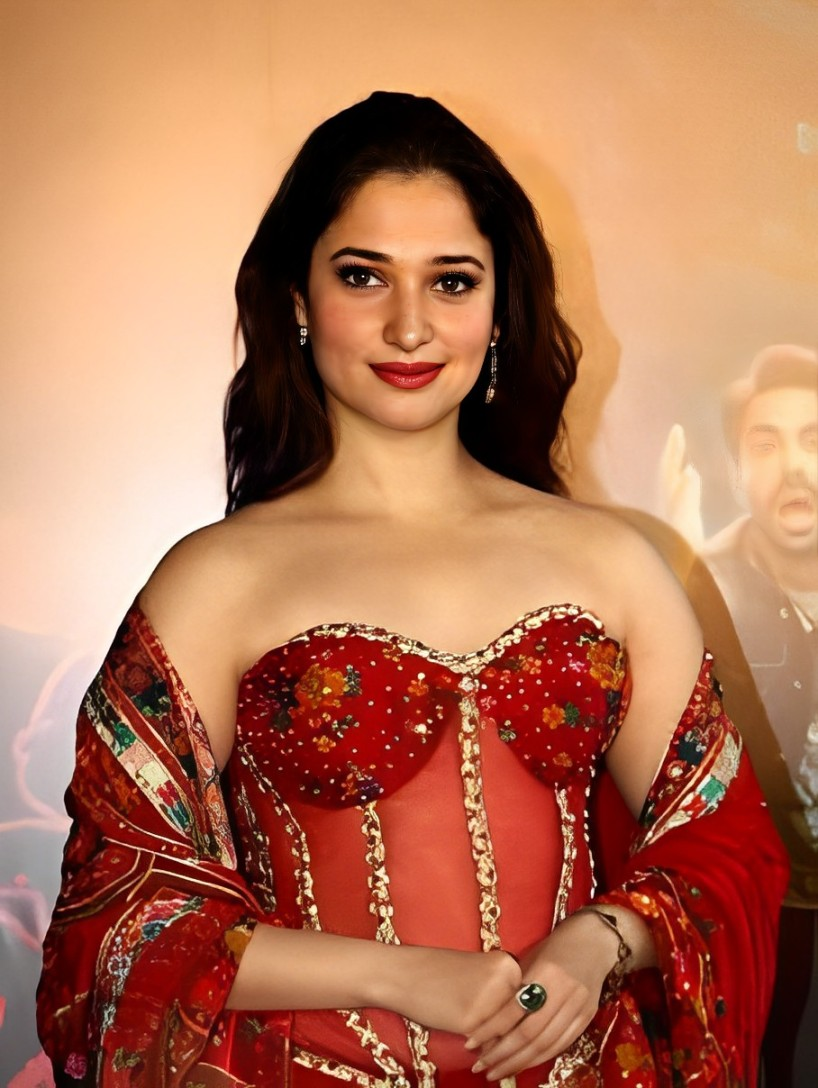
- Bhatia in 2024
- Film: 87
- Television: 6
- Hosting: 1

Tamannaah Bhatia is an Indian actress known for her work in Tamil, Telugu and Hindi cinema. She debuted as a leading lady in the Hindi film Chand Sa Roshan Chehra in 2005. That same year marked her Telugu debut with Sree, followed by her Tamil debut in Kedi the subsequent year. She experienced a breakthrough in her career with the success of Happy Days and Kalloori in 2007, portraying college students in both films. Her journey continued with box-office hits like Ayan, 100% Love, Siruthai, Tadakha, Oosaravelli, Racha and Veeram as well as setbacks such as Ananda Thandavam, Endukante Premanta, Himmatwala, Humshakals and Aagadu. Additionally, while she received critical acclaim and several accolades for her role in 100% Love, her performances in Himmatwala and Humshakals faced criticism.

In 2015, Bhatia received praised for her role in Baahubali: The Beginning, which earned over ₹600 crore. She was praised for her performances in Oopiri and Dharma Durai, and her double role in Devi was well received. However, Vasuvum Saravananum Onna Padichavanga, Bengal Tiger and Kaththi Sandai were less successful. In 2017, she reprised her role in Baahubali 2: The Conclusion, which grossed over ₹1700 crore worldwide, while Anbanavan Asaradhavan Adangadhavan was a box office failure. In 2018, Sketch received mixed reviews, but her performance was praised, while Naa Nuvve and Next Enti? were poorly received. In 2019, she starred in the blockbuster F2: Fun and Frustration and delivered notable performances in Kanne Kalaimaane, Devi 2, Khamoshi, Sye Raa Narasimha Reddy and Petromax.

In 2021, Bhatia starred in the streaming series 11th Hour and November Story both receiving mixed receptions despite her praised acting. She gained acclaim for her roles in Seetimaarr and Maestro. The subsequent year saw her in the hit Telugu comedy F3: Fun and Frustration, while Babli Bouncer, Plan A Plan B and Gurthunda Seethakalam garnered mixed reception. In 2023, she starred in the streaming series Jee Karda and Aakhri Sach While Jailer was a major blockbuster that reestablished her presence in Kollywood, Bhola Shankar and her Malayalam debut Bandra became huge box-office disappointments. The following year, she had a commercial success in Aranmanai 4.. In 2024, she went on to receive widespread acclaim and recognition with her special appearance in Stree 2.

== Films ==
Key
†	Denotes films that have not yet been released

List of films done by Tamannaah Bhatia
Year	Title	Role(s)	Language	Notes	Ref.
2005	Chand Sa Roshan Chehra	Jia Oberoi	Hindi		
2005	Sree	Sandhya	Telugu		
2006	Kedi	Priyanka	Tamil		
2007	Viyabari	Savithri	Tamil		
2007	Happy Days	Madhu	Telugu		
2007	Kalloori	Shobhana	Tamil		
2008	Kalidasu	Archana	Telugu		
2008	Ready	Swapna	Telugu	Cameo	
2008	Netru Indru Naalai	Aasha	Tamil	Bilingual film; cameo	
2008	Ninna Nedu Repu	Aasha	Telugu	Bilingual film; cameo	
2009	Padikkadavan	Gayathri	Tamil		
2009	Konchem Ishtam Konchem Kashtam	Geetha Subramanyam	Telugu		
2009	Ayan	Yamuna	Tamil		
2009	Ananda Thandavam	Madhumitha	Tamil		
2009	Kanden Kadhalai	Anjali	Tamil		
2010	Paiyaa	Charulatha	Tamil		
2010	Sura	Poornima	Tamil		
2010	Thillalangadi	Nisha	Tamil		
2011	Siruthai	Swetha	Tamil		
2011	Ko	—	Tamil	Cameo in song "Aga Naga"	
2011	100% Love	Mahalakshmi	Telugu		
2011	Badrinath	Alakananda	Telugu		
2011	Venghai	Radhika	Tamil		
2011	Oosaravelli	Niharika	Telugu		
2012	Racha	Chaitra "Ammu"	Telugu		
2012	Endukante Premanta	Srinidhi / Sravanthi (Note: Bhatia plays two characters.)	Telugu		
2012	Rebel	Nandini	Telugu		
2012	Cameraman Gangatho Rambabu	Ganga	Telugu		
2013	Himmatwala	Rekha Singh	Hindi		
2013	Tadakha	Pallavi	Telugu		
2014	Veeram	Koperundevi "Koopu"	Tamil		
2014	Humshakals	Shanaya	Hindi		
2014	Alludu Seenu	—	Telugu	Special appearance in song "Labbar Bomma"	
2014	Entertainment	Saakshi	Hindi		
2014	Aagadu	Saroja	Telugu		
2015	Nannbenda	Herself	Tamil	Cameo	
2015	Baahubali: The Beginning	Avanthika	Telugu	Bilingual film	
2015	Baahubali: The Beginning	Avanthika	Tamil	Bilingual film	
2015	Vasuvum Saravananum Onna Padichavanga	Aishwarya Balakrishnan	Tamil		
2015	Size Zero	Herself	Telugu	Bilingual film; cameo	
2015	Inji Iduppazhagi	Herself	Tamil	Bilingual film; cameo	
2015	Bengal Tiger	Meera	Telugu		
2016	Speedunnodu	—	Telugu	Special appearance in song "Bachelor Babu"	
2016	Oopiri	Keerthi	Telugu	Bilingual film	
2016	Thozha	Keerthi	Tamil	Bilingual film	
2016	Dharma Durai	Dr Subhashini	Tamil		
2016	Ranveer Ching Returns	—	Hindi	Short film	
2016	Jaguar	—	Kannada	Special appearance in song "Sampige Enne"	
2016	Jaguar	—	Telugu	Special appearance in song "Mandara Thailam"	
2016	Devi	Devi / Ruby	Tamil	Trilingual film	
2016	Abhinetri	Devi / Ruby	Telugu	Trilingual film	
2016	Tutak Tutak Tutiya	Devi / Ruby	Hindi	Trilingual film	
2016	Kaththi Sandai	Divya / Bhanu (Note: Bhatia plays a character with two names.)	Tamil		
2017	Baahubali 2: The Conclusion	Avanthika	Telugu	Partially reshot in Tamil	
2017	Anbanavan Asaradhavan Adangadhavan	Ramya	Tamil		
2017	Jai Lava Kusa	—	Telugu	Special appearance in song "Swing Zara"	
2018	Sketch	Amuthavalli	Tamil		
2018	Aa Bb Kk	Tamanna	Marathi	Cameo	
2018	Naa Nuvve	Meera	Telugu		
2018	Next Enti?	Tammy	Telugu		
2018	KGF: Chapter 1	Milky	Kannada	Special appearance in song "Jokae Nannu"	
2019	F2: Fun and Frustration	Harika	Telugu		
2019	Kanne Kalaimaane	Bharathi	Tamil		
2019	Devi 2	Devi	Tamil	Bilingual film	
2019	Abhinetri 2	Devi	Telugu	Bilingual film	
2019	Khamoshi	Surbhi	Hindi		
2019	Sye Raa Narasimha Reddy	Lakshmi Narasimha Reddy	Telugu		
2019	Petromax	Meera	Tamil		
2019	Action	Diya	Tamil		
2020	Sarileru Neekevvaru	—	Telugu	Special appearance in song "Daang Daang"	
2021	Seetimaarr	Jwala Reddy	Telugu		
2021	Maestro	Simran	Telugu		
2022	Ghani	—	Telugu	Special appearance in song "Kodthe"	
2022	F3: Fun and Frustration	Harika	Telugu		
2022	Babli Bouncer	Babli Tanwar	Hindi		
2022	Plan A Plan B	Nirali Vora	Hindi		
2022	Gurthunda Seethakalam	Nidhi	Telugu		
2023	Lust Stories 2	Shanthi	Hindi	Segment: "Sex With Ex"	
2023	Jailer	Kamna	Tamil		
2023	Bhola Shankar	Lasya	Telugu		
2023	Bandra	Tara Janaki	Malayalam		
2024	Aranmanai 4	Selvi	Tamil		
2024	Stree 2	Shama	Hindi	Cameo	
2024	Vedaa	Raashi	Hindi	Cameo	
2024	Nayanthara: Beyond the Fairytale	Herself	English	Documentary film	
2024	Sikandar Ka Muqaddar	Kamini Singh	Hindi		
2025	Odela 2	Bhairavi / Bhavani	Telugu		
2025	Raid 2	—	Hindi	Special appearance in song "Nasha"	
2025	Baahubali: The Epic	Avanthika	Telugu	Combined remastered version of two-part Baahubali films.	
2026	O'Romeo	Rabia Jalaluddin Shah	Hindi	Special appearance	
2026	The Vvaan: Force of the Forrest	Mamta	Hindi		
2026	Jailer 2	Kamna	Tamil	Special appearance as a dancer in the song "Kaavaalaa" footage	
2027	Ragini 3 †	TBA	Hindi	Filming	
2027	Rangers	TBA	Hindi	Post-production	
2027	Purushan	TBA	Tamil	Filming	
TBA	IPS Maria	Preeti Maria	Hindi	Post-production	
TBA	V. Shantaram	Jayashree	Hindi	Pre-production	

== Television ==
Key
†	Denotes television programs that have not yet premiered

List of television shows done by Tamannaah Bhatia
Year	Title	Role(s)	Language	Notes	Ref.
2021	11th Hour	Aratrika Reddy	Telugu		
2021	November Story	Anuradha "Anu" Ganesan	Tamil		
2021	MasterChef India – Telugu	Host	Telugu	Season 1, Episodes 1–16	
2023	Jee Karda	Lavanya Singh	Hindi		
2023	Aakhri Sach	Inspector Anya Swaroop	Hindi		
2025	Do You Wanna Partner	Shikha Roy Chowdury	Hindi		
2026	Everyone Can Design	Host	Hindi		

== Music ==
List of music videos done by Tamannaah Bhatia
Year	Title	Singer(s)	Language	Album	Ref.
2005	"Lafzon Mein"	Abhijeet Sawant	Hindi	Aapka... Abhijeet Sawant	
2022	"Tabahi"	Badshah	Hindi	Retropanda	
2025	"Ghafoor"	Shilpa Rao, Ujwal Gupta	Hindi	The Ba***ds of Bollywood	

== See also ==
- List of awards and nominations received by Tamannaah Bhatia
