= List of awards and nominations received by Tamannaah Bhatia =

Tamannaah Bhatia awards and nominations
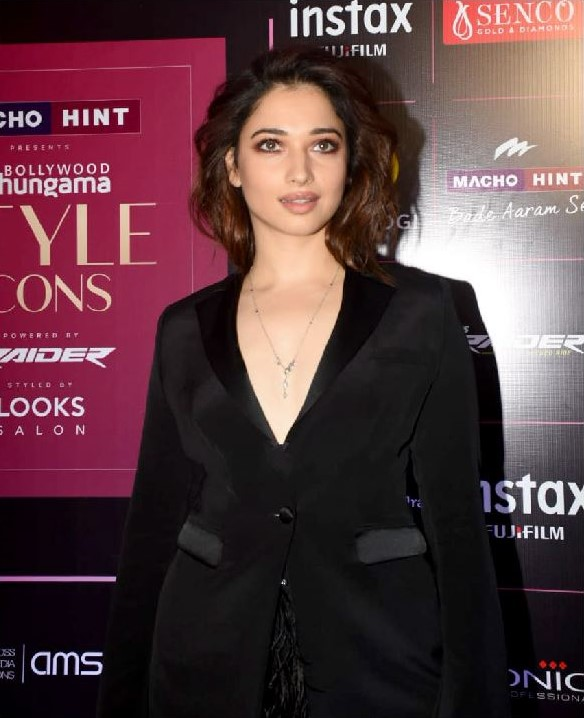
- Bhatia in 2023 at the Bollywood Hungama Style Icons Awards
Awards and nominations
Award	Wins	Nominations
Saturn Awards	0	1
Zee Cine Awards	0	2
Asianet Film Awards	1	1
Asiavision Awards	1	1
Bollywood Hungama OTT India Fest	1	1
CineMAA Awards	1	2
Filmfare Awards South	0	8
IIFA Utsavam	0	2
Lokmat Stylish Awards	1	1
Santosham Film Awards	3	3
South Indian International Movie Awards	2	6
Vijay Awards	0	3

Totals (Note: Certain award groups do not simply award one winner. They acknowledge several different recipients, have runners-up, and have third place. Since this is a specific recognition and is different from losing an award, runner-up mentions are considered wins in this award tally. For simplification and to avoid errors, each award in this list has been presumed to have had a prior nomination.)
- Wins: 29
- Nominations: 52
- Honours: 2

Tamannaah Bhatia is an Indian actress known for her work in Tamil, Telugu and Hindi cinema. Since 2008, she has been a consistent presence at the Filmfare Awards South, earning nominations for her roles in Tamil films including Kalloori, Kanden Kadhalai and Paiyaa, and Telugu films including Konchem Ishtam Konchem Kashtam, 100% Love and Racha. In 2010, she received the Kalaimamani award from the Government of Tamil Nadu for her contributions to arts and culture. Her performance in 100% Love garnered acclaim, earning her best category awards at the CineMAA Awards, Hyderabad Times Film Awards, Santosham Film Awards and TSR - TV9 National Film Awards. Her role in Tadakha earned her the South Indian International Movie Awards for Best Actress (Critics) and the TSR-TV9 National Film Award for Best Actress. Her role in Baahubali: The Beginning brought her international recognition and a nomination for Best Supporting Actress Actress at the Saturn Awards.

In Tamil cinema, Bhatia won best category awards at the Asianet Film Awards and Asiavision Awards. She also received an Honorary Doctorate from the Confederation of International Accreditation Commission for her achievements in the entertainment industry. She won the Behindwoods Gold Hall of Famers award for Entertainer and the Bollywood Hungama OTT India Fest award for Best Actor of the Year Female (Series), highlighting her versatility. She also won Best Actress in a Feature Film at the Indo-French International Film Festival Awards for her role in Kanne Kalaimaane. Her consistent recognition led to her being named "Star In The Spotlight" at the Beautiful Indians awards.

== Awards and nominations ==
List of awards and nominations received by Tamannaah Bhatia
Award	Year	Category	Nominated for	Result	Ref.
Asianet Film Awards (Note: Year indicates production date of nominated work, except for film industry achievement awards, where it refers to the ceremony date.)	2016	Most Popular Tamil Actress	Devi	Won	
Asiavision Awards	2016	Best Actress – Tamil	Dharma Durai	Won	
Beautiful Indians	2024	Star In The Spotlight	Film industry achievements	Won	
Behindwoods Gold Hall Of Famers	2023	Entertainer	Jailer	Won	
Blenders Pride Filmfare Glamour & Style Awards	2025	Most Desirable (Female)	Film industry achievements	Won	
Bollywood Hungama OTT India Fest	2023	Best Actor of The Year Female (Series)	Aakhri Sach, Jee Karda	Won	
Bollywood Hungama Style Icons	2023	Most Stylish Trend Setter (Female)	Film industry achievements	Won	
CineMAA Awards	2012	Best Actress – Telugu	100% Love	Won	
CineMAA Awards	2013	Best Actress – Telugu	Racha, Endukante Premanta	Nominated	
Dayawati Modi Global Awards	2017	Youth Icon Of The Year	Film industry achievements	Won	
Edison Awards	2025	Favourite Actress – Tamil	Aranmanai 4	Nominated	
Elle List	2025	Performer Of The Year	Film industry achievements	Won	
Filmfare Awards South	2007	Best Actress – Tamil	Kalloori	Nominated	
Filmfare Awards South	2009	Best Actress – Tamil	Kanden Kadhalai	Nominated	
Filmfare Awards South	2009	Best Actress – Telugu	Konchem Ishtam Konchem Kashtam	Nominated	
Filmfare Awards South	2010	Best Actress – Tamil	Paiyaa	Nominated	
Filmfare Awards South	2011	Best Actress – Telugu	100% Love	Nominated	
Filmfare Awards South	2012	Best Actress – Telugu	Racha	Nominated	
Filmfare Awards South	2015	Best Actress – Telugu	Baahubali: The Beginning	Nominated	
Filmfare Awards South	2016	Best Actress – Tamil	Devi	Nominated	
Filmfare Middle East Achiever’s Night Awards	2022	Best Director-Actor Duo	Babli Bouncer	Won (Note: Tied with Madhur Bhandarkar)	
Global Spa Fit & Fab Awards	2021	Pan–India Entertainer	Film industry achievements	Won	
Hindustan Times India's Most Stylish Awards	2022	Breaking The Mould (Female)	Film industry achievements	Won	
Hyderabad Times Film Awards	2011	Best Actress	100% Love	Won	
IIFA Utsavam Awards	2016	Best Performance in a Leading Role – Female (Telugu)	Baahubali: The Beginning	Nominated	
IIFA Utsavam Awards	2016	Best Performance in a Leading Role – Female (Tamil)	Baahubali: The Beginning	Nominated	
Indo-French International Film Festival Awards	2023	Best Actress Feature Film	Kanne Kalaimaane	Won	
Lokmat Stylish Awards	2022	Most Stylish Fashion Icon	Film industry achievements	Won	
NRI of the year Awards	2017	Global Indian Impact Icon	Baahubali: The Beginning, Baahubali 2: The Conclusion	Won	
Sakal Sanman	2025	Entertainer Of The Year	Film industry achievements	Won	
Santosham Film Awards	2011	Best Actress	100% Love	Won	
Santosham Film Awards	2018	Sridevi Smarakam Award	Film industry achievements	Won	
Santosham Film Awards	2019	Best Actress	F2: Fun and Frustration	Won	
Saturn Awards	2015	Best Supporting Actress	Baahubali: The Beginning	Nominated	
South Indian International Movie Awards	2011	Best Actress – Telugu	100% Love	Nominated	
South Indian International Movie Awards	2013	Best Actress – Telugu	Tadakha	Nominated	
South Indian International Movie Awards	2013	Best Actress (Critics) – Telugu	Tadakha	Won	
South Indian International Movie Awards	2016	Best Actress – Tamil	Dharma Durai	Nominated	
South Indian International Movie Awards	2019	Best Actress – Tamil	Kanne Kalaimaane	Nominated	
South Indian International Movie Awards	2024	Celebrating 20 Years In Cinema	Film industry achievements	Won	
South Scope Awards	2009	Best Actress	Kanden Kadhalai	Won	
South Scope Lifestyle Awards	2016	South India's Most Admired Celebrity	Baahubali: The Beginning, Baahubali 2: The Conclusion	Won	
Tira Grazia Fashion Awards	2025	One & Only Style Icon	Film industry achievements	Won	
TSR - TV9 National Film Awards	2011–12	Best Heroine	100% Love	Won	
TSR - TV9 National Film Awards	2013–14	Best Actress	Tadakha	Won	
Vijay Awards	2009	Best Actress	Kanden Kadhalai	Nominated	
Vijay Awards	2009	Favourite Heroine	Ayan	Nominated	
Vijay Awards	2010	Favourite Heroine	Paiyaa	Nominated	
Zee Apsara Awards	2018	Sridevi Memorial Award	Film industry achievements	Won	
Zee Cine Awards	2014	Best Debut Actress	Himmatwala	Nominated	
Zee Cine Awards	2020	Favourite Actress – Tamil	Devi 2, Kanne Kalaimaane, Action	Nominated	
Zee Cinemalu Awards	2017	Queen of Box Office	Baahubali: The Beginning, Bengal Tiger, Oopiri, Abhinetri	Nominated	

== Honours ==
List of honours received by Tamannaah Bhatia
Year	Honour	Granted by	Ref.
2010	Kalaimamani	Government of Tamil Nadu	
2017	Honorary Doctorate	Confederation of International Accreditation Commission	

== Media recognition ==
Popularity ranking received by Tamannaah Bhatia from various platforms
Year	Category	Rank	Organisation	Ref.
2017	Top stars of Indian cinema	#4	IMDb	
2020	Most tweeted about actors (female) in South Indian entertainment	#7	Twitter	
2021	Most influential social media stars of South cinema	#10	Forbes India	
2021	Most tweeted about actors (female) in South Indian entertainment	#8	Twitter	
2023	Most popular Indian stars	#6	IMDb	
2014–2024	Top 100 most viewed Indian stars of the last decade	#16	IMDb	

== See also ==
- Tamannaah Bhatia filmography
