= Boomika =

2021 Indian Tamil-language film by Rathindran R. Prasad

- Promotional poster
- Also known as: Bhoomika
- Genre: Action thriller
- Written by: Rathindran R. Prasad
- Directed by: Rathindran R. Prasad
- Starring: Aishwarya Rajesh; Avantika Vandanapu; Vidhu
- Music by: Prithvi Chandrasekhar
- Country of origin: India
- Original language: Tamil

Production
- Producer: Karthik Subbaraj
- Cinematography: Roberto Zazzara
- Running time: 123 minutes
- Production company: Stone Bench Films

Original release
- Network: Star Vijay
- Release: 22 August 2021

Boomika also spelt as Bhoomika, is a 2021 Indian Tamil-language horror thriller film written and directed by Rathindran R. Prasad. The film is also touted as the first film with the genre of eco action thriller. The film stars Aishwarya Rajesh, Avantika Vandanapu, Vidhu, Madhuri Jain and Pavel Navageethan. The film resembles similar to the storyline of Karthik Subbaraj's directorial Mercury. It was directly released via Star Vijay on 22 August 2021 and streamed internationally through Netflix, the following day (23 August 2021). The film opened to average reviews.

== Plot ==
In Nagapattinam, a man drives home to visit his pregnant wife. While talking to her on the phone about a recently concluded construction deal, his car collides with an oncoming truck, killing him.

Meanwhile, Samyuktha "Sam" - a psychologist based in Ooty, is seeking medical therapy for her 4-year-old son - Siddhu, who suffers from speech impediment. Sam's husband, Gautham, is a rising architect, who has just concluded a deal for the refurbishment of a deserted compound, for a politician. To focus on the project, the couple invites Gautham's childhood-friend, Gayathri - a reputed architect, and Aditi - Gautham's sister, to live with them at the compound.

While preparing to stay at the compound for the night, Gayathri begins texting with Krishna, an old-friend of hers. While sending a selfie of her and Aditi to him, he eerily replies that, he too, will be seen the picture - if they "begin to take things more seriously". However, Gautham reveals that Krishna, had died in a car accident the previous night, and that phones don't get satellite connectivity at the compound. Soon after, more paranormal activities begin to occur; Gayathri's phone begins to regularly beep with newer messages, despite her even having removed its battery. Concurrently, the power blacks out. Horrified with the recent events, the group attempts to flee, only to thwarted by their malfunctioning car.

Having retreated back into the compound, Sam and Gayathri deduce that the recent texts weren't sent by Krishna, given his premature demise, but that of a paranormal source. Gautham then divulges that the compound, was earlier a school, which had been deserted over ten-years ago, on account of paranormal activities in the aftermath of a girl's death - infamously known as the "Mount Roseyard School Mystery". While seeking to find clues about the school's history, the group discovers several magazines with articles relating to the mystery; the pages of the articles are missing. Concurrently, Aditi - petrified with the recent events, attempts to flee, only to be ambushed by a pack of wild dogs. Gautham and Dharman - the compound's security guard, manage to save her, despite all three getting injured. While treating Aditi, the group discovers the torn pages in the house of the school's former librarian.

While reading the pages, the group learns that the girl in-question, Boomika - was the autistic daughter of the librarian, Ganesan. Boomika - an exceptionally-talented artist, and a nature lover, was well known for her astonishing works of art. She had spent most of her time, either painting in an abandoned flat, or leisuring in the nearby forest, despite Ganesan's wishes for her to pursue proper education. With a growing reputation - she was admitted into the school; however, she had died mysteriously afterwards. In the aftermath of her death, the entire school and the surrounding residents were reported to have migrated elsewhere, after reports of multiple murders in the area.

Dharman bizarrely quips that Boomika and the Earth "are the same" - it will take revenge on anyone who dares to "desecrate it". Gayathri deduces his view as the Gaia Hypothesis - that the Earth itself is a single, self-regulating organism, while other living forms thrive in a sort of symbiotic relationship with it; any organism which threatens to destabilize the Earth's ecological balance with ruin, will be killed. Elsewhere, Gautham visits the abandoned flat where Boomika used to paint, and witnesses the wall-paintings moving. Simultaneously, a paranoid Aditi, manages to musters enough courage to destroy Gayathri's phone - which she believes is the root cause for the recent events. Gayathri follows her, only to stop dead in her tracks, when she sees a ghastly apparition - presumably Boomika's spirit, behind Aditi. "Boomika" knocks out Aditi and Gayathri, and begins to chase Sam, who attempts to flee. Dharman manages to create a distraction; he is knocked out instead. Sam reunites with Gautham; they rush back into the compound upon realizing than Siddhu was left behind. Sam finds Siddhu painting with Boomika; she leaves a few moments later, without harming him, but not before Siddhu utters "Thank you", indicating that he overcame his impediment.

With Boomika presumably gone, the group vacates the house. In the aftermath of the night's events - Aditi is shown to be receiving therapy for trauma, Gayathri is recuperating from her injuries, Dharman has retreated to his hometown, Siddhu has regained his ability of speech, while Gautham remains in Ooty to focus on the refurbishment project; he cautiously conducts a bhumi puja (sacred rituals), in an attempt to prevent Boomika from returning. Elsewhere, Sam, who is visiting Gayathri in Bengaluru, is told by the latter about the true circumstances behind Boomika's death - Boomika had committed suicide, distraught with the then-ongoing infrastructure projects - which had threatened deforestation of the surrounding forests. Gayathri further reveals that Ganesan was intimidated to remain silent, and that the target of the murders which occurred in the aftermath of her death, were all people related to construction-activities. Gayathri realizes that Boomika's actions matches the Gaia Hypothesis - just as how the Earth would "kill" anyone which threatened to destroy its ecological sanctity, Boomika had murdered the construction workers, whose activities had threatened to cause ruin to her environment. Realizing that Gautham may be in danger, Sam rushes back to Ooty; it is shown that she had persuaded him to continue with the project, despite the paranormal events, and that Krishna was the one who had mediated the deal between Gautham and the politician - thus resulting in his death in the car crash (the politician was also murdered a while later).

Upon her return to Ooty, Sam is told that Gautham is about to refurbish the abandoned flat; however, she is too late to save him, as the flat's door locks Gautham inside, leaving him trapped, much to Sam's despair. Gautham witnesses the wall-paintings moving once again; he sees Boomika right in front of him. She lets out a scream, before the screen cuts to black - implying that she is about to kill Gautham.

== Cast ==
- Aishwarya Rajesh as Samyuktha "Sam" Gowtham
- Avantika Vandanapu as Boomika
- Vidhu as Gowtham
- Pavel Navageethan as Dharman
- Surya Ganapathy as Gayathri
- Madhuri Jain as Aditi
- Ayaan Abhishek, as Siddhu
- Prasanna Balachandran (Nakkalites) as Ganesan
- Eashvar Karthic as Krishna, Gayathri, Sam and Gowtham's friend
- Srija Priyadharshini (Nakkalites), as Sumathi

== Production ==
The film project was announced by Rathindran R. Prasad as his second directorial venture after his unreleased film project Ithu Vedhalam Sollum Kathai. Boomika incidentally became his first film have its official released before his first film project. The film was bankrolled by Karthik Subbaraj under his production banner Stone Bench and Passion Films. The principal photography of the film commenced in 2019 and the portions of the film were extensively shot in Ooty. The shooting of the film was completed way before the onset of the COVID-19 pandemic as the shooting of the film was wrapped up in a single schedule in Nilgiris. It also marked 25th film for Aishwarya Rajesh in her acting career. The first look poster of the film was unveiled on 19 October 2020 by actors Jayam Ravi and Tamannaah.

== Soundtrack ==
Soundtrack was composed by Prithvi Chandrasekhar.

- Mannenum Maaya Thee - Prithvi Chandrasekhar, Andrea Jeremiah

== Release ==
The film has its direct premiere via Star Vijay on 22 August 2021 at 3 pm and opened to generally mixed reviews. The film was globally premiered via Netflix on 23 August 2021, the day after the television premiere.

== Reception ==
First Post rated the film 2 out of 5 stars indicating that the film uses a textbook approach to the monster in the house genre. Indian Express rated the film 2.5 out of 5 stars indicating that the film is a watchable thriller. The Hindustan Times stated, "the film is a visually pleasing thriller with convoluted messaging." Times of India gave the film 2.5 out of 5 stars and stated, "its an elegantly shot horror thriller that gives in-your-face message." Sify wrote "Boomika begins well with an interesting premise and a much-needed message at a time when the entire world is suffering due to global warming and other environmental hazards but it suffers due to the preachy tone!".
