= Kira Narayanan =

Malaysian film and theatre actress and musician

- Occupations: Actress, TV presenter
- Years active: 2018–present

Kira Narayanan is an Indian actress and TV presenter. She is best known for playing Aayat in "Jee Karda" on Amazon Prime Video, hosting Cricket Live on the Star Sports Network and for playing the role of Princess Jasmine in Disney and BookMyShow's Aladdin the Musical in India.

== Personal life ==
Kira grew up in Malaysia and started acting when she was 13. She was a member of the National Youth Theatre of Great Britain (London).

== Career ==
=== Television and film ===
Kira debuted as an English Television Sports Anchor for Star Sports India during Vivo Pro Kabaddi Season 7 (2019). She then went on to anchor for "Cricket Live" in the absence of Mayanti Langer, hosting her first Indian Premier League (IPL) in 2020, as well as the India/England Test, ODI and T20I Series in 2021. She's appeared alongside cricket greats and network regulars Sunil Gavaskar, Brian Lara, Brett Lee, VVS Laxman, Gautham Gambhir, Greame Swann, Lisa Sthalekhar, Irfan Pathan, Harbhajan Singh and Dean Jones.

She starred in Jee Karda on Amazon Prime Video co-starring Tamannaah Bhatia, and in the 2019 web series Minus One, where she appeared opposite Indian web stars Aisha Ahmed and Ayush Mehra.

She made her feature film debut as a classical dancer in the 2018 Tamil film Koothan.

=== Stage ===
Kira was cast by Tess Joseph to play Princess Jasmine in the stage Musical version of the Disney film Aladdin, produced by Disney International and BookMyShow.

In 2019, Kira stepped into the iconic shoes of Audrey Hepburn and Julie Andrews to play the role of Eliza Doolittle in Rael Padamsee's My Fair Lady the Musical.

== Work and filmography ==
=== Television ===
Year	Title	Role	Channel	Language	Notes
2019	KBD Live/Total KBD Raid On	Anchor	Star Sports	English	Anchor for live/recorded Vivo Pro Kabaddi programming
2019	Cricket Live/Match Point/Follow The Blues	Reporter/Anchor	Star Sports	English	Reporter/Anchor for Cricket Programming
2020	Cricket Live	Anchor	Star Sports	English	Anchor for Dream 11 IPL 2020
2021	Cricket Live	Anchor	Star Sports	English	Anchor for India/England 2021 (Test/T20I/ODI)
2023	Jee Karda	Aayat Merchant	Amazon Prime Video	Hindi	
2019	Minus One	Devika/Lavanya	YouTube	Hindi	

=== Plays/Musicals ===
Year	Show	Role	Director	Producer	Notes	Ref.
2018	Aladdin the Musical (India)	Princess Jasmine	Shruti Sharma	BookMyShow/Disney India	Played in Mumbai (NCPA) & Delhi (JLN Stadium)	
2019	My Fair Lady	Eliza Doolittle	Karla Singh	ACE Productions	NCPA (Mumbai)	

=== Films ===
Year	Title	Role	Language	Notes	Ref.
2018	Koothan	Devi	Tamil		
