= Driver Jamuna =

2022 Tamil language thriller film

- Theatrical release poster
- Directed by: P. Kinslin
- Produced by: S. P. Chowthari
- Starring: Aishwarya Rajesh; Aadukalam Naren; Kavitha Bharathi
- Cinematography: Gokul Benoy
- Edited by: R. Ramar
- Music by: Ghibran
- Production company: 18 Reels
- Release date: 30 December 2022
- Running time: 103 minutes
- Country: India
- Language: Tamil

Driver Jamuna is a 2022 Indian Tamil-language thriller film directed by P. Kinslin and starring Aishwarya Rajesh in the eponymous role, with Aadukalam Naren and Kavitha Bharathi in the lead roles. It was released on 30 December 2022. The film started streaming on aha from 20 January 2023.

== Plot ==
Jamuna (Aishwarya Rajesh) is a cab driver, who happens to take a shared ride with a musician (Abishek Kumar) and three other men travelling to a wedding. But as it turns out, the three passengers are contract killers en route to take down an ex-MLA. Caught between the goons and police, Jamuna tries to survive and also save the killers' target.

Social media star and comedian Abhishek Kumar plays the ambitious musician.

== Cast ==
- Aishwarya Rajesh as Jamuna
- Aadukalam Naren as Maragathavel
- Daffe Naveen as Mathi/Magizh (Jamuna's brother)
- Kavitha Bharathi
- Abhishek Kumar
- Ilaya Pandi
- Manikandan Rajesh
- Sriranjani as Jamuna's mother
- Pandian as Jamuna's father

== Production ==
The film was officially announced in January 2021, coinciding with Aishwarya Rajesh's birthday. Touted to be a "crime thriller", production began by March 2021 with Kinslin of Vathikuchi (2013) fame, making his return as director. To incorporate their body language into her character, Aishwarya Rajesh met many taxi drivers during her research for the film.

== Release ==
The film was theatrically released on 30 December 2022 across Tamil Nadu, alongside a Telugu dubbed version. The film started streaming on aha from 20 January 2023 while the film's satellite rights were brought by Kalaignar TV.

== Reception ==
The film opened to mixed reviews; while Aishwarya Rajesh's performance received positive reviews, the film received criticism for its writing.

A reviewer from Times of India noted "Aishwarya Rajesh tries her best to save this hastily written road thriller" adding that "Driver Jamuna has engaging moments, but it's definitely not the road movie one would willingly opt for". A reviewer from The New Indian Express noted "the Aishwarya Rajesh-starrer is all over the place all at once" adding that "the earnestness of the filmmaker's vision probably withered away due to a lack of focused writing and prosaic filmmaking techniques". The Hindustan Times wrote "for a thriller, it reserves most of its thrills for the last 10 minutes, and that’s a move that may not appeal to everybody", while India Today noted the "lacklustre film that suffers from logical loopholes".
