= Mei (film) =

2019 Indian Tamil-language medical thriller film

- Theatrical release poster
- Directed by: SA Baskaran
- Screenplay by: SA Baskaran
- Story by: Sentha Murugesan
- Starring: Nicky Sundaram; Aishwarya Rajesh
- Cinematography: VN Mohan
- Music by: Prithvi Kumar; Anil Johnson (BGM)
- Production company: Sundaram Productions
- Release date: 23 August 2019
- Running time: 112 minutes
- Country: India
- Language: Tamil

Mei (transl. Truth/ Body) is a 2019 Indian Tamil-language medical thriller film written and directed by SA Baskaran in his directorial debut. The film stars newcomer Nicky Sundaram and Aishwarya Rajesh in the lead roles, while Kishore, Charle, Ajay Ghosh, and Vinod Krishnan play supporting roles. The film is based on the real story relating to medical mafias in India. The film is produced under the production banner Sundaram Productions. The songs for the film were composed by Prithvi Kumar. The film was released on 23 August 2019.

== Plot ==
The missing case of a young girl unfolds mystery behind several hidden crimes related to a medical racket as investigation continues.

Abhinav Chandran, an aspiring doctor who returned from the US, is chased by police when a medical racket alleges him for the reason behind the death of a medical shop employee. He is assisted by medical representative Uthra .

== Cast ==
- Nicky Sundaram as Dr. Abhinav Chandran
- Aishwarya Rajesh as Uthra
- Kishore as Muthukrishnan
- Charle as Narmadha's father
- Ajay Ghosh as Karunakaran
- Vinod Krishnan as Dr. Jayanth
- Kavithalaya Krishnan as Manager
- E. Ramdoss as Police officer
- George Maryan as Gopi
- Aroul D. Shankar as Doctor
- Abhishek Vinod
- Gowthami Vembunathan as Hostel Warden
- Tigergarden Thangadurai as Gopi's friend
- K. S. G. Venkatesh as Shanti's father

== Production ==
This film marked the debut of T. V. Sundram Iyengar's grandson, Nicky Sundaram, who works as a New York-based doctor.

== Soundtrack ==
Soundtrack was composed by New York-based composer Prithvi Kumar and received positive reviews from The Times of India.

- "Maalaiye" - Prithvi Kumar
- "Kaatre Silamurai" - Prithvi Kumar
- "Maayavalai" - Prithvi Kumar, Sanjana Raja

== Reception ==
A critic from The Hindu wrote "As the title suggests, Mei is about finding the truth behind The Curious Case of A Missing Girl. But it’s a weakly-scripted movie that doesn’t quite take off." Times of India wrote "The story and characters look too good on paper with some twists and a few engaging sequences. [..] However, the making of a slick thriller like this could have been more gripping as it lacks any sharp cuts or edge of the seat moments". A critic from The New Indian Express wrote "One of the oft-used conclusions drawn about a middling movie is that it has its heart in the right place. Unfortunately, for Mei, a film based on organ trafficking, I can’t quite say that". A critic from Sify wrote "Overall, ‘Mei’ is a watchable thriller for the research work done by the young team, the strong supporting cast and the crisp run time".
