= Kitchen Super Star =

- No. of episodes: 27 \

Release
- Original network: Vijay TV
- Original release: 2 August 2014 – 7 February 2015

Kitchen Super Star (Tamil: கிச்சன் சூப்பர் ஸ்டார்) is a 2013-2015 Indian-Tamil language Cooking reality show that aired on Vijay TV from 2013 to 7 February 2015 on every Saturday at 8:00PM (IST). The Show is hosted by Tamil Film Actor Suresh and Chefs Dr. Dhamu and Venkatesh Bhat are the judges of this show.

Myna Nandhini won the season.

Seasons

The show was a 6 Seasons Telecast on Vijay TV

- Kitchen Super Star (season 1)
- Kitchen Super Star (season 2)
- Kitchen Super Star (season 3)
- Kitchen Super Star (season 4)
- Kitchen Super Star Junior
- Kitchen Super Star Doubles

== Season 01 ==
Contestants	Winner
Shiva	Pooja Lokesh
Ilavarasan	Pooja Lokesh
Priya	Pooja Lokesh
Nethiran	Pooja Lokesh
Pooja	Pooja Lokesh
Santhiya	Pooja Lokesh
Aarthi	Pooja Lokesh
Nisha	Pooja Lokesh
Prithi	Pooja Lokesh
J. Lalitha	Pooja Lokesh
Aravind	Pooja Lokesh
Saparna	Pooja Lokesh

== Season 02 ==
The second season of the Kitchen Super Star (season 2) (Tamil: கிச்சன் சூப்பர் ஸ்டார் 2) aired from 27 April 2014 on every Saturday at 8:00PM (IST). The finalists were Harita, Maheshwari Chanakyan, Bala Anandh, Susan, Priya and Sindhu Shyam. The winner of the show is Sindhu Shyam.

== Season 03 ==
The third season of the Kitchen Super Star (season 2) (Tamil: கிச்சன் சூப்பர் ஸ்டார் 3) aired from 2 August 2014 to 7 February 2015 on every Saturday at 8:00PM (IST) for 27 Episodes. The show winner is Saravanan Meenatchi (season 2) Fame Nandhini.

Contestants	Runner Up	Winner
Diwakar	Singapore Deepan	Myna Nandhini
Vishnu	Singapore Deepan	Myna Nandhini
Shalini	Singapore Deepan	Myna Nandhini
Myna Nandhini	Singapore Deepan	Myna Nandhini
Velmurugan	Singapore Deepan	Myna Nandhini
Brindha Das	Singapore Deepan	Myna Nandhini
Madan	Singapore Deepan	Myna Nandhini
Syamantha Kiran	Singapore Deepan	Myna Nandhini
Singapore Deepan	Singapore Deepan	Myna Nandhini
Anitha	Singapore Deepan	Myna Nandhini
Douglas Moorthy	Singapore Deepan	Myna Nandhini
Priyanka Deshpande	Singapore Deepan	Myna Nandhini

== Season 04 ==
The third season of the Kitchen Super Star (season 4) (Tamil: கிச்சன் சூப்பர் ஸ்டார் 4) aired from 14 February 2015 to 11 July 2015 on every Saturday at 8:00PM (IST) for 22 Episodes. The show winner is Jeniffer and Travline.
