= Aishwarya Rajesh =

Indian actress (born 1990)

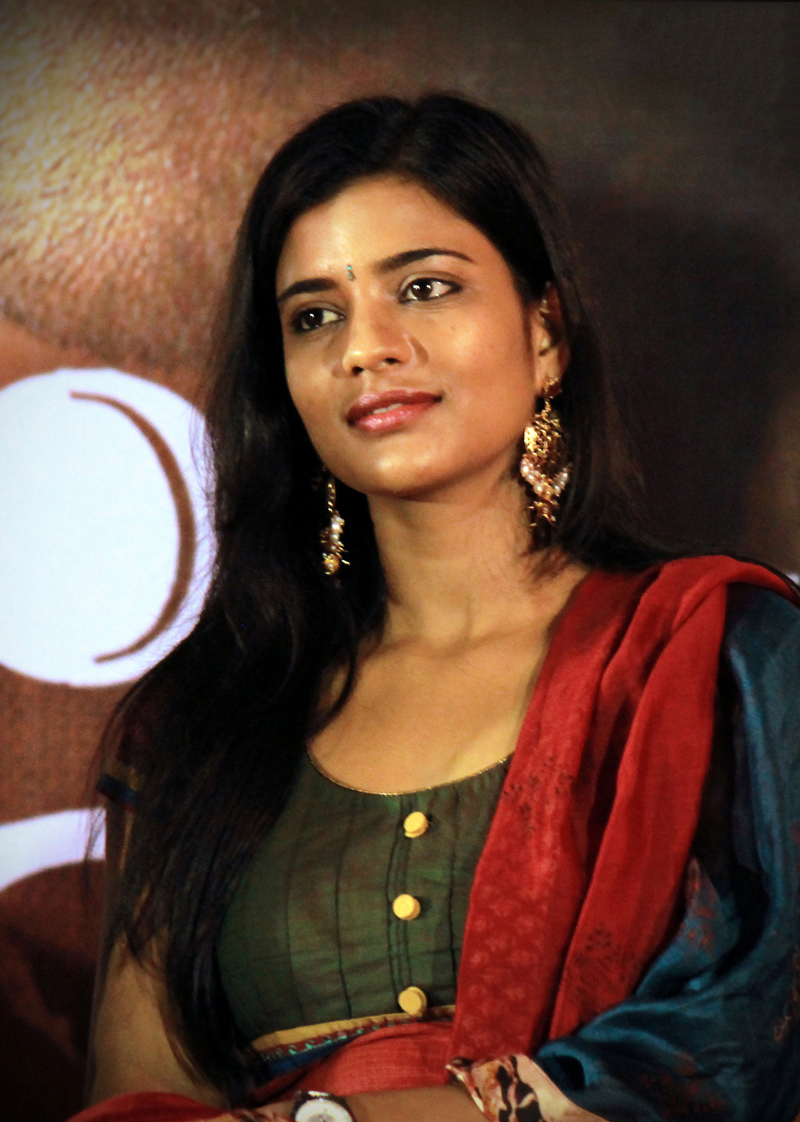
- Aishwarya in 2014
- Born: 10 January 1990 (age 36); Madras, Tamil Nadu, India
- Education: Ethiraj College for Women (B.Com)
- Occupation: Actress
- Years active: 1995(child artist); 2010–present
- Relatives: Rajesh (Father); Aishwarya Lakshmi Priya (Aunt); Manikandan Rajesh (Brother)
- Honours: Kalaimamani (2020)

Aishwarya Rajesh (born 10 January 1990) is an Indian actress who works predominantly in Tamil cinema, in addition to a few Telugu and Malayalam films. Aishwarya is a recipient of several awards including two Filmfare Awards South, two Tamil Nadu State Film Awards and six SIIMA Awards.

Aishwarya started her career as television presenter in a comedy show called Asatha Povathu Yaaru?. After winning the reality show Maanada Mayilada, she was cast in the film Avargalum Ivargalum (2011) and came into prominence after starring in Attakathi (2012). She has received Tamil Nadu State Film Award for Best Actress for the 2014 film Kaaka Muttai. Aishwarya had her career breakthrough roles in the film, Vada Chennai (2018) and her solo film Kanaa (2018). For the latter, she won the Filmfare Critics Award for Best Actress – Tamil. She made her Malayalam debut with Jomonte Suvisheshangal (2017), Hindi film debut in 2017 with Daddy, and Telugu debut with Kousalya Krishnamurthy (2019), which was a remake of Kanaa.

Aishwarya received praises for her portrayal of a struggling married woman in World Famous Lover (2020), a woman who strives to bring her deceased husband's body back in Ka Pae Ranasingam (2020), an NRI in Republic (2021) and a cop in Thittam Irandu (2021).

== Early life and education ==
Aishwarya Rajesh was born on 10 January 1990 in a Telugu family in Chennai (then Madras). Her father Rajesh was a Telugu film actor who died when she was still young. Her mother Nagamani was a dancer. Her grandfather Amarnath was also a Telugu film actor, while her aunt Sri Lakshmi, is a Telugu comedian with over 500 films to her credit. She is the youngest of four siblings, whose two elder brothers died during her teenage years.

Aishwarya grew up in Chennai, and she described her background as "lower middle class." She studied in Shrine Vailankanni, Chennai, Sree Vidyanikethan International School, Tirupati, and Holy Angels Anglo Indian Higher Secondary School, Chennai. In 1995, she performed as a child actress in the Telugu film Rambantu.

She studied at Ethiraj College for Women, Chennai and graduated with a B.Com degree. She started to learn dancing since she needed to choreograph a stage show for a student cultural festival. This opened an opportunity for her to enter the reality show Maanada Mayilada on Kalaignar TV. She won the show's third season and got offered roles in films after this TV appearance.

== Career ==
=== Debut and early work (2010–2015) ===
In the early stages of her career, Aishwarya also worked as an anchor on the sets of the TV show Asathapovathu Yaaru. In 2010, she was cast in Avargalum Ivargalum (2011) although the low-key film Indrasena (2010) was released first. Her first big hit was the critically acclaimed Attakathi in 2012, where she was cast as Amudha, a simple village girl, by Pa. Ranjith in his debut as a director. In 2014, she was seen alongside Vijay Sethupathi in two films, Rummy, and Pannaiyarum Padminiyum, released within two weeks. While the first film was a village drama set in the 1980s, the latter was based on a short film of the same name, and revolved around an old man and his vintage car Premier Padmini. Critics praised her performances, especially in Rummy. Hindustan Times wrote that she was "extremely promising" while film critic Baradwaj Rangan noted that she was "expressive", calling her "a tonic for nerves frayed by the alabaster automatons we usually get as heroines". Later that year, she appeared in a song sequence in R. Parthiepan's Kathai Thiraikathai Vasanam Iyakkam and as the female lead in Thirudan Police. In April 2014, she began filming for Seenu Ramasamy's Idam Porul Yaeval, but the film remains unreleased as of May 2020.

Aishwarya's career marked a turning point with her first release of 2015, Kaaka Muttai. Initially, she was very hesitant to play a mother role at such an early stage in her career, but, after seeking advice from her Pannaiyarum Padminiyum co-star Vijay Sethupathi and after gaining interest in the script herself, she decided to be part of the film. Her portrayal of a slum dweller and mother of two children was lauded unanimously by critics: Baradwaj Rangan wrote, "it features stunning performances from everyone...especially Aishwarya Rajesh, who plays the kids' mother with a world-weariness that belies her years". Other reviewers stated that she played her role "with extraordinary ease" and that she "leaves you awe-struck". Her performance earned her several accolades including Tamil Nadu State Film Award for Best Actress and her first Filmfare Award for Best Actress – Tamil nomination. That year, she also made her stage debut, playing Cinderella from the same-titled fairytale that was adapted as a "musical dance drama".

=== Critical acclaim, success and recognition (2016–2022) ===
Following the success of Kaaka Muttai, Aishwarya had eight film releases in 2016, of which Aarathu Sinam, Hello Naan Pei Pesuren, Manithan and Dharma Durai were commercially successful. While, Kuttrame Thandanai, Kadalai, Parandhu Sella Vaa and Mo were box office averages. S. Saraswath took note of her "remarkable performance" as a farm labourer in Dharma Durai opposite Vijay Sethupathi. In Kuttrame Thandanai, she played a modern woman opposite Vidharth. A critic from The New Indian Express stated, "Aishwarya yet again proves that the length of the role doesn’t matter. As Shweta with gray shades to her character, she may have got less screen space but leaves her impact."

In 2017, Aishwarya expanded to Malayalam films with Jomonte Suvisheshangal opposite Dulquer Salmaan and Sakhhavu opposite Nivin Pauly, both of which were box office successes. Kattappava Kaanom and Gemini Ganeshanum Suruli Raajanum were her other release that year. In her last film of the year, Aishwarya made her debut in Hindi films opposite Arjun Rampal in Daddy. She played gangster-turned-politician Arun Gawli's wife in the film. In Jomonte Suvisheshangal, she played an accountant and critic Srivatsan from India Today was appreciative of her "convincing performance". The film earned her nomination for Filmfare Award for Best Supporting Actress – Malayalam, while both her Malayalam films won her the Asiavision Award for Outstanding Performer.

Aishwarya's first two films of 2018, Lakshmi and Saamy Square had poor box office returns. Her next three releases Chekka Chivantha Vaanam, Vada Chennai and Kanaa were critical and commercial success, being among the year's highest grossing films. In Vada Chennai, she played a carrom player's wife opposite Dhanush. Sowmya Rajendran found her to be "delightful" and praised her chemistry with Dhanush. Her career breakthrough came with Kanaa, where she played an aspiring cricketer. She trained for several days before shooting the film. M Suganth noted, "Aishwarya who appears sans makeup in most of the scenes, makes us buy Kausi and breathes life into the role." Her performance earned her second Filmfare Best Actress – Tamil nomination and won her the Filmfare Critics Award for Best Actress – Tamil. In 2019, she first appeared in Vilambaram. She then reprised her role as a cricketer in the Telugu remake Kousalya Krishnamurthy, which marked her debut in Telugu films. Suresh Kavirayani stated that she is terrific and fits the role. Her other releases that year were Namma Veettu Pillai, Mei and Mismatch, all of which met with mixed to negative reviews.

In her first film of 2020, she played a supporting character in Vaanam Kottattum. In World Famous Lover, she played a village girl opposite Vijay Deverakonda. It was a box office failure but Janani K of India Today noted, "Aishwarya single-handedly stole the show with her realistic performance as a naive Suvarna." The film won her the SIIMA Critics Award for Best Actress – Telugu. She then played a woman who lost her husband in Dubai in Ka Pae Ranasingam opposite Vijay Sethupathi. Regarding her performance, critic Manoj Kumar R noted, "Aishwarya is a revelation. She displays hopelessness, powerlessness, vulnerability, grit and determination with ease and impressive conviction". The film earned her another Filmfare Best Actress – Tamil nomination and won her the SIIMA Award for Best Actress – Tamil. In 2021, she played a police officer in Thittam Irandu, a NRI rape victim in Republic opposite Sai Dharam Tej and then appeared in Boomika and Tuck Jagadish, none of which emerged a box office success. For Thittam Irandu, she won the SIIMA Critics Award for Best Actress – Tamil and Saibal Chatterjee noted, "Her unwaveringly focused lead performance [..] ensures that the film's rough edges are smoothened out to a certain extent." Her only release in 2022 was Driver Jamuna, where she played the titular character.

=== Career progression (2023–present) ===
Aishwarya had six releases in 2023: The Great Indian Kitchen, Run Baby Run, Soppana Sundari, Farhana, Theera Kaadhal and Pulimada. In The Great Indian Kitchen, she played a wife opposite Rahul Ravindran. Several critics were appreciative of her performance and credited her for saving the Tamil version. In Farhana, she played the titular Muslim woman working at a call centre. Gopinath Rajendran noted, "Aishwarya is film's biggest pillar. In one of her best roles in recent times, she shows her resilience in her actions rather than words." The film earned her another nomination for Filmfare Best Actress – Tamil and won her second Filmfare Best Actress Critics – Tamil. In 2024, Aishwarya appeared as the lead in DeAr opposite G. V. Prakash Kumar and in Her, both of which received mixed reviews. Then in ARM, Aishwarya played a warrior's lover opposite Tovino Thomas. Anandu Suresh of The Indian Express stated that she "leaves a mark" despite her character lacking depth. The film was a commercial success at the box office.

In her first film of 2025, Aishwarya played an ex-police officer's wife opposite Venkatesh, in Sankranthiki Vasthunam. The film emerged as a blockbuster. T. Maruthi Acharya noted, "Aishwarya steals the spotlight with her natural, impactful performance."

== Media image ==
S. Subhakeerthana of The Indian Express noted, "Aishwarya Rajesh's carefully thought-out and prudent choices reflect on her filmography." For the actress performance in Kaaka Muttai, S Saraswathi of Rediff.com said that she was the film's "biggest surprise". News18 India noted, "Be it nailing exceptional roles or mesmerising the audience with her dialogue delivery, acting comes naturally to her." Aishwarya is known for her strong women portrayals in films such as Kaaka Muttai, Kanaa, World Famous Lover, Ka Pae Ranasingam and The Great Indian Kitchen.

Aishwarya has frequently featured in Chennai Times' 30 Most Desirable Woman list. She became the Chennai Times' Most Desirable Woman in 2018. She ranked 13th in 2017, 2nd in 2019 and 6th in 2020. Aishwarya ranked 3rd in Rediff.com's "Top Tamil Actresses" list of 2015. Her performance in Kakka Muttai is regarded as one of the "100 Greatest Performances of the Decade" by Film Companion. She received the Kalaimamani award in 2020, for her contributions to the Tamil cinema. She has also spoken about her childhood, sexual harassment and more on TedX talk in 2020 at IIM Trichy.

== Filmography ==
Key
†	Denotes films that have not yet been released

=== Films ===
List of Aishwarya Rajesh film credits
Year	Title	Role	Language	Notes	Ref.
1995	Rambantu	Unnamed	Telugu	Child artist; Special appearance in the song "Emo Gurram Egaravachu"	
2010	Indrasena	Unknown	Tamil	Credited as Aishwarya	
2010	Neethana Avan	Nandhini	Tamil	Credited as Aishwarya	
2011	Avargalum Ivargalum	Swetha	Tamil	Credited as Aishwarya	
2011	Uyarthiru 420	Charu	Tamil	Credited as Aishwarya	
2011	Sattapadi Kutram	Sumathi	Tamil	Credited as Aishwarya	
2012	Vilayada Vaa	Anu	Tamil	Credited as Aishwarya	
2012	Attakathi	Amudha	Tamil	Credited as Aishwarya	
2012	Aachariyangal	Anu	Tamil		
2013	Puthagam	Thara	Tamil		
2014	Rummy	Sornam	Tamil		
2014	Pannaiyarum Padminiyum	Malarvizhi	Tamil		
2014	Kathai Thiraikathai Vasanam Iyakkam	Herself	Tamil	Cameo appearance	
2014	Thirudan Police	Poornima	Tamil		
2015	Kaaka Muttai	The Mother	Tamil		
2015	Idam Porul Yaeval	Rithika	Tamil	Unreleased film	
2016	Aarathu Sinam	Mia Aravind	Tamil		
2016	Hello Naan Pei Pesuren	Kavitha	Tamil		
2016	Manithan	Jennifer	Tamil		
2016	Dharma Durai	Anbu Selvi	Tamil		
2016	Kuttrame Thandanai	Swetha	Tamil		
2016	Kadalai	Kalai	Tamil		
2016	Parandhu Sella Vaa	Madhavi	Tamil		
2016	Mo	Priya	Tamil		
2017	Jomonte Suvisheshangal	Vaidhegy Perumal	Malayalam		
2017	Mupparimanam	Herself	Tamil	Cameo appearance	
2017	Kattappava Kaanom	Meena	Tamil		
2017	Sakhavu	Janaki	Malayalam		
2017	Gemini Ganeshanum Suruli Raajanum	Pooja	Tamil		
2017	Daddy	Zubeida Mujawar / Asha Gawli	Hindi		
2018	Lakshmi	Nandhini	Tamil		
2018	Saamy Square	Bhuvana	Tamil		
2018	Chekka Chivantha Vaanam	Renuka Thyagarajan	Tamil		
2018	Vada Chennai	Padma	Tamil		
2018	Kanaa	Kousalya Murugesan	Tamil		
2019	Vilambaram	Aishwarya	Tamil		
2019	Kousalya Krishnamurthy	Kousalya Krishnamurthy	Telugu		
2019	Mei	Uthra	Tamil		
2019	Namma Veettu Pillai	Thulasi Ayyanar	Tamil		
2019	Mismatch	Maha Lakshmi	Telugu		
2020	Vaanam Kottatum	Mangai	Tamil		
2020	World Famous Lover	Suvarna	Telugu		
2020	Ka Pae Ranasingam	Ariyanachi Rana Singam	Tamil		
2021	Thittam Irandu	Athira	Tamil		
2021	Boomika	Samyuktha Gowtham	Tamil		
2021	Tuck Jagadish	Chandra	Telugu		
2021	Republic	Myra Hanson	Telugu		
2022	Driver Jamuna	Jamuna	Tamil		
2023	The Great Indian Kitchen	Wife	Tamil		
2023	Run Baby Run	Tara	Tamil		
2023	Soppana Sundari	Agalya	Tamil		
2023	Farhana	Farhana	Tamil		
2023	Theera Kaadhal	Aaranya	Tamil		
2023	Pulimada	Mahishmathi Emily Jayaram	Malayalam		
2024	Dear	Deepika	Tamil		
2024	ARM	Chothi	Malayalam	Cameo Appearance	
2024	Her	Anamika	Malayalam		
2025	Sankranthiki Vasthunam	Bhagyalakshmi Sinaraju	Telugu		
2025	Theeyavar Kulai Nadunga	Meera	Tamil		
2026	Oh..! Sukumari	Damini / Sukumari	Telugu		
2026	Mahendragiri Varahi	Goddess Varahi	Telugu		
2026	Karuppar Nagaram †	TBA	Tamil	Delayed	
2026	Mohandas †	TBA	Tamil	Delayed	
2026	Dhruva Natchathiram †	TBA	Tamil	Awaiting release	
2026	Uttarakaanda †	Durgi	Kannada	Delayed	

=== Television ===
List of Aishwarya Rajesh television credits
Year	Title	Language	Role	Notes	Ref.
2007	Asatha Povathu Yaaru	Tamil	Host		
2007	Maanada Mayilada	Tamil	Contestant	Season 3; Winner	
2022	Suzhal: The Vortex (season 1)	Tamil	Nandini	Amazon Prime Video	
2023	Cooku with Comali (season 4)	Tamil	Herself	Guest appearance	
2025	Suzhal: The Vortex (season 2)	Tamil	Nandini	Amazon Prime Video	
2026	Isakapatnam	Telugu	Bharathi	Amazon Prime Video	
TBA	Pakashala Pantham	Telugu	TBA	ETV Win	

=== Music videos ===
List of Aishwarya Rajesh music video credits
Year	Title	Artist	Director	Ref.
2018	"Bodhai Kodhai"	Sanjith Hegde	Gautham Vasudev Menon	

== Awards and nominations ==
List of awards and nominations received by Aishwarya Rajesh
Year	Award	Category	Film	Result	Ref.
2015	Filmfare Awards South	Best Actress – Tamil	Kaaka Muttai	Nominated	
2015	Edison Awards	Best Actress	Kaaka Muttai	Nominated	
2016	South Indian International Movie Awards	Best Actress – Tamil	Kaaka Muttai	Nominated	
2016	IIFA Utsavam	Best Supporting Actress – Tamil	Kaaka Muttai	Nominated	
2016	Norway Tamil Film Festival Awards	Best Actress	Kaaka Muttai	Won	
2017	Tamil Nadu State Film Awards	Best Actress	Kaaka Muttai	Won	
2017	Filmfare Awards South	Best Supporting Actress – Tamil	Dharmadurai	Nominated	
2017	South Indian International Movie Awards	Best Supporting Actress – Tamil	Dharmadurai	Won	
2017	Asiavision Awards	Outstanding Performer – National	Sakhavu and Jomonte Suvisheshangal	Won	
2018	Tamil Nadu State Film Awards	Tamil Nadu State Film Award Special Prize	Kanaa and Vada Chennai	Won	
2018	Filmfare Awards South	Best Supporting Actress – Malayalam	Jomonte Suvisheshangal	Nominated	
2019	Ananda Vikatan Cinema Awards	Best Actress	Kanaa	Nominated	
2019	Edison Awards	Best Actress	Kanaa	Nominated	
2019	Edison Awards	Young Inspirational Actress	Kanaa	Won	
2019	South Indian International Movie Awards	Best Actress – Tamil	Kanaa	Nominated	
2019	South Indian International Movie Awards	Best Actress Critics – Tamil	Kanaa	Won	
2019	Filmfare Awards South	Best Actress – Tamil	Kanaa	Nominated	
2019	Filmfare Awards South	Critics Best Actress – Tamil	Kanaa	Won	
2020	Zee Cine Awards Tamil	Best Actress	Kanaa	Won	
2020	Ananda Vikatan Cinema Awards	Best Supporting Actress	Namma Veettu Pillai	Nominated	
2020	Norway Tamil Film Festival Awards	Best Supporting Actress	Namma Veettu Pillai	Won	
2021	South Indian International Movie Awards	Best Actress – Telugu	World Famous Lover	Nominated	
2021	South Indian International Movie Awards	Best Actress Critics – Telugu	World Famous Lover	Won	
2021	South Indian International Movie Awards	Best Actress – Tamil	Ka Pae Ranasingam	Won	
2022	Filmfare Awards South	Best Actress – Tamil	Ka Pae Ranasingam	Nominated	
2022	South Indian International Movie Awards	Best Actress – Tamil	Thittam Irandu	Nominated	
2022	South Indian International Movie Awards	Best Actress Critics – Tamil	Thittam Irandu	Won	
2024	Filmfare Awards South	Best Actress – Tamil	Farhana	Nominated	
2024	Filmfare Awards South	Critics Best Actress – Tamil	Farhana	Won	
2024	South Indian International Movie Awards	Best Actress – Tamil	Farhana	Nominated	
2026	South Indian International Movie Awards	Best Actress – Telugu	Sankranthiki Vasthunam	Nominated	
2026	South Indian International Movie Awards	Critics Best Actress – Telugu	Sankranthiki Vasthunam	Won	
