= Koothan =

2018 Tamil film by Venky AL

- Poster
- Directed by: Venky AL
- Written by: Chitraa Venky; Venky AL; Suki Murthy
- Produced by: Nilgiris Murugan
- Starring: Raj Kumar; Srijita Ghosh; Nagendra Prasad
- Cinematography: T. Madasamy
- Edited by: Peter Bapiah
- Music by: Balz_G
- Release date: 11 October 2018
- Country: India
- Language: Tamil

Koothan (transl. Dancer) is a 2018 Indian Tamil-language musical film written and directed by Venky AL. The film stars newcomers Raj Kumar, Srijita Ghosh, and Nagendra Prasad. Koothan released to negative reviews.

== Plot ==
Raana (Raj Kumar) is a dancer who earns his living by doing several shows for the Battery Boys dance team. His mother (Urvashi), a junior artiste in films, is a nightmare for filmmakers, thanks to her terrible acting skills. He once happens to meet Srilakshmi (Srijita Ghosh), another dancer from Srilakshmi Srividya Dance School, at a competition held in the city, where the latter makes her presence only to settle some personal scores with Krishna (Nagendra Prasad), the head of Krishna Dance Academy. Raana and Srilakshmi become close eventually after meeting a couple of times.

== Cast ==
- Raj Kumar as Raana
- Srijita Ghosh as Srilakshmi
- Kira Narayanan as Devi, Srilakshmi's elder sister
- Sonal Singh as Dimple
- Nagendra Prasad as Krishna
- Junior Balaiah
- Kavithalayaa Krishnan
- Azhagu
- Sriranjani as Bharatanatyam teacher
- Kavitha Bharathy
- VJ Adams
- Mullai Dhanasekaran
- Kothandam
- Badava Gopi as Asian Dance Competition Host
- Urvashi as Kalairasi, Raana's mother
- K. Bhagyaraj as Actor
- Manobala as Film Director
- S. S. Stanley
- Ramki as Judge (guest appearance)
- Renuka as Actress
- Kala Master as Judge (guest appearance)
- Ashmini Balakrishnan as Apoorva, Srilakshmi's friend

Uncredited

- Priyadarshini as Emcee
- Chu Koy Sheng as Anchor

== Music ==
The music for the film was composed by Balz_G.

Track listing
No.	Title	Lyrics	Singer(s)	Length
1.	"Monkistha Kinkistha"	Rokesh	T. Rajendar, Shenbagaraj, Shajani	3:54
2.	"Theeradha Theedalgal"	MK Balaji	Padmalatha, Kamalaja, MK Balaji	3:38
3.	"Kadhal Kattu Merandi"	Viveka	Remya Nambeesan, Hariharasudhan, Vidya Lakshmi	4:00
4.	"Solladha Solladha"	Viveka	Aishwarya, Jyothi Krishna, MK Balaji	5:27
5.	"Koothanamma Koothan"	Kabilan	Velmurugan	3:30
Total length:				20:29

== Reception ==
A critic from The Times of India gave the film one-and-a-half out of five stars and wrote that "The film, except for a few dance movements and the performances of Rajkumar and Nagendra Prasad, is a tiresome watch".
