= SIIMA Critics Award for Best Actress – Telugu =

Telugu-language media award

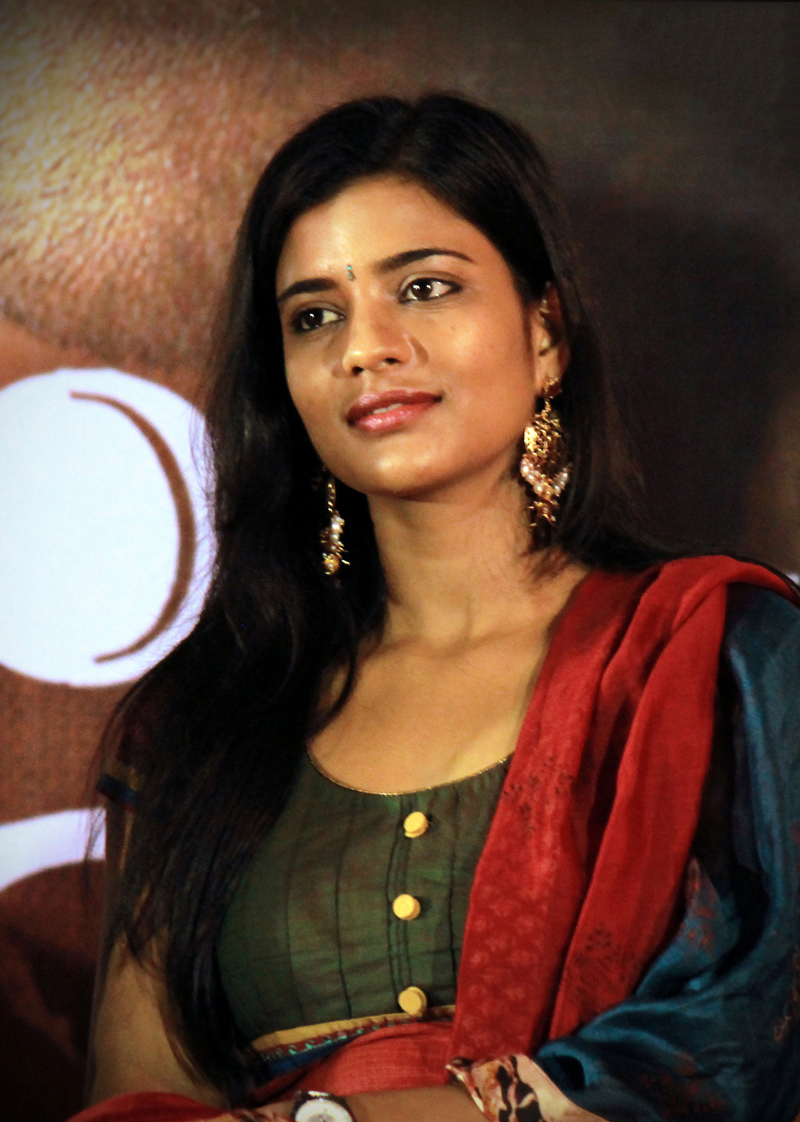
- The 2026 recipient: Aishwarya Rajesh
- Awarded for: Best Performance by an Actress in a Leading Role in Telugu cinema
- Country: India
- Presented by: Vibri Media Group
- First award: 21 June 2012 (for films released in 2011)
- Most recent winner: Aishwarya Rajesh, Sankranthiki Vasthunam (2025)

Highlights
- Most wins: Aishwarya Rajesh, Samantha and Mrunal Thakur (2)

SIIMA Critics Award for Best Actress – Telugu is presented by Vibri media group as part of its annual South Indian International Movie Awards, for best acting done by an actress in Telugu films, who are selected by the jury. The award was first given in 2012 for films released in 2011.

== Superlatives ==
Categories	Recipient	Notes
Most wins	Aishwarya Rajesh	2
Most wins	Samantha	2
Most wins	Mrunal Thakur	2
Most consecutive wins	Mrunal Thakur	2 (2022–2023)
Youngest winner	Hansika Motwani	Age 20 (1st SIIMA)
Oldest winner	Anushka Shetty	Age 34 (5th SIIMA)

- Nayanthara, Pooja Hegde, Rashmika Mandanna and Samantha have also won the SIIMA Award for Best Actress – Telugu.

== Winners ==
Year	Actress	Film	Ref.
2011	Hansika Motwani	Kandireega	
2012	Nayanthara	Krishnam Vande Jagadgurum	
2013	Tamannaah Bhatia	Tadakha	
2014	Samantha	Manam	
2015	Anushka Shetty	Rudhramadevi	
2016	No Award		
2017	Ritika Singh	Guru	
2018	Samantha	Rangasthalam	
2019	Rashmika Mandanna	Dear Comrade	
2020	Aishwarya Rajesh	World Famous Lover	
2021	Pooja Hegde	Most Eligible Bachelor	
2022	Mrunal Thakur	Sita Ramam	
2023	Mrunal Thakur	Hi Nanna	
2024	Meenakshi Chaudhary	Lucky Baskhar	
2025	Aishwarya Rajesh	Sankranthiki Vasthunam	

== See also ==
- SIIMA Award for Best Actress – Telugu
- SIIMA Award for Best Female Debut – Telugu
