= Arunima Sharma (filmmaker) =

Indian film director

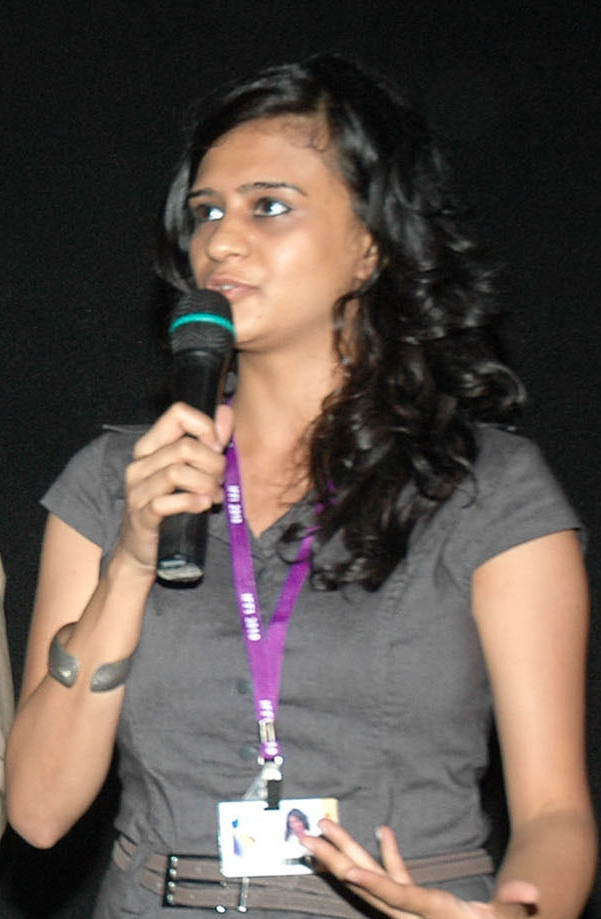
- Sharma in 2010
- Education: FTII
- Occupation: film director
- Years active: 2010-present

Arunima Sharma is an Indian film director who has directed popular web series and commercials and written screenplays.

Arunima received a National Film Award for Best Direction in the Non-Feature Film category for Shyam Raat Seher — tr: Blue Dusk Dawn — (2010). The film was also selected for the Indian Panorama section of the International Film Festival of India in 2010 and was screened at other notable festivals.

Shyam Raat Seher was Arunima's student diploma film, made as part of her second-year curriculum at the Film and Television Institute of India (FTII), Pune, from where she graduated in film direction in 2010. The film follows the life of a middle-aged television actor trying to revive his declining career.

Shyam Raat Seher also won the National Film Award for Best Cinematography, awarded to Murali G. Additionally, he received awards for the film's cinematography at the Pune International Film Festival and Fujifilm's national-level competitions.

Arunima was also the screenwriter of Foto (2007), which won the National Film Award for Best Children's Film, and she served as its associate director as well. She has directed more than 100 commercials for various brands.

== Filmography ==
As director, non-feature or short films

- Shyam Raat Seher — tr: Blue Dusk Dawn — (2010)
- Yellow Tin Can Telephone (2016) — screened at multiple film festivals

As director or lead director, web series

- Four More Shots Please! (2019) — directed 5 of its 7 episodes
- Jee Karda (2023)

As director, commercials

- Airbnb
- CaratLane by Tanishq
- Colgate
- Estée Lauder
- HDFC Ergo
- Legrand Allzy
- L'Oréal Paris
- Manyavar Taiyaar Hoke Aaiye
- Myntra
- Oziva
- Ponds
- Quench
- Shell
- Shyam Steel

As associate director, feature films

- Cocktail (2012)
- Finding Fanny (2014)

As screenwriter, feature films or web series

- Foto (2007)
- Jee Karda (2023)
