= DeAr =

2024 Indian romantic drama film

- OTY release poster
- Directed by: Anand Ravichandran
- Written by: Anand Ravichandran
- Produced by: Varun Tripuraneni; Abhishek Ramisetty; G. Pruthviraj
- Starring: G. V. Prakash Kumar; Aishwarya Rajesh
- Cinematography: Jagadeesh Sundaramoorthy
- Edited by: Rukesh
- Music by: G. V. Prakash Kumar
- Production company: Nutmeg Productions
- Distributed by: Romeo Pictures
- Release date: 11 April 2024
- Country: India
- Language: Tamil

DeAr is a 2024 Indian Tamil-language romantic drama film written and directed by Anand Ravichandran, and produced by Nutmeg Productions. The film stars G. V. Prakash Kumar and Aishwarya Rajesh in the lead role, alongside Rohini, Kaali Venkat, Ilavarasu, and Thalaivasal Vijay.

The film was officially announced in December 2022 under the tentative title Production No. 3, as it is the third production for the production house, and the official title was announced in May 2023. Principal photography commenced the same month as the former month, and wrapped by early August 2023. The film has music composed by G. V. Prakash Kumar, cinematography handled by Jagadeesh Sundaramoorthy, and editing by Rukesh.

DeAr was theatrically released on 11 April 2024. The title "DeAr" is based on the character's names: Deepika (Aishwarya) and Arjun (Prakash Kumar).

== Plot ==
Arjun is a newsreader who lives in Chennai with his single mother, his short-tempered brother, Saravana, sister in law, Kalpana and nephew, Santhosh. He suffers from light sleep, which means the quietest of sounds will awaken him. In Coonoor, Deepika Alias Deepu is seeking for an alliance, which fails because she addresses her snoring problem. As Arjuns Mother Lakshmi and Deepika's Mother, Vasanthi were old schoolmates, Arjun and Deepika both get along well and eventually get married. On the first night, Arjun confesses about his light sleepiness, which makes Deepika paranoid. She decides to stay awake on her mother's advice but falls asleep and ends up waking up Arjun. He becomes paranoid, so much so that his honeymoon ends early when he breaks his nose in an accident. Eventually on his friends advice, he decides to address the problem with an understanding and initially things seem fine. But when ENT specialists says its untreatable, he starts arguing with Deepika. He then comes up with an idea of alternating sleep, so whoever is not sleeping has to be awake. Everything goes fine and eventually Arjun gets a job as newsreader at his dream company. But things go south when he doesn't sleep on the day there is a last minute interview with the finance minister, he prepares for it but ends up sleeping in the bathroom, missing the show, being humiliated by his colleagues and fired. Enraged, Arjun decides to apply for divorce, much to Deepika's dismay. Everyone else disagrees and tries to pull him out of it, but he won't budge, resulting in him arguing with his brother and mother and leaving the house, living with his friend, Panda. Deepika reveals shes pregnant, however adamant with his decision, Arjun decides to raise the baby separately. Deepika is upset and decides to abort the baby, despite Arjun trying to talk her out of it.

A few months later, Arjun and Deepika is still in the middle of divorce proceedings. Unemployed, unkempt and resorting to drinking and smoking. At one point, he comes to see his mother when shes out, but she gets heart pain and is hospitalized. While she is going through bypass surgery, his mother wishes to see her husband, Shanmugam, who left after accumulating loads of debt. Deepika wants to go search for him and pleads Arjun to do so, as Saravana holds an untameable grudge against his father. They track him to Idukki, and after convincing him, find him and bring him back to see him, all are happy except Saravana, as he lost trust in him. He gets shouted at by his mother, who reveals he made others decisions all by himself without asking anyone. such as Kalpana love for writing stories.

Eventually, Shanmugam and Saravana patch up and on the final day of hearing, Arjun and Deepika, talks through and eventually cancels their divorce. A Couple years later, Arjun and Deepu have a baby, as hes reading them a story, Deepu points out that the baby is snoring, they both laugh and live happily.

== Cast ==
- G. V. Prakash Kumar as Arjun, Deepika's Husband
- Aishwarya Rajesh as Deepika "Deepu/Deeps", Arjun's wife
- Thalaivasal Vijay as Shanmugam, Lakshmi's husband, Saravanan and Arjun's Father
- Ilavarasu as Rangarajan
- Kaali Venkat as Saravanan, Arjun's Elder Brother, Kalpana's Husband
- Nandhini as Kalpana, Saravanan's wife
- Rohini as Lakshmi, Shanmugam's wife, Saravanan and Arjun's Mother
- Chitra Lakshmanan as Doctor
- Badava Gopi as Advocate Adaikalasamy
- Geetha Kailasam as Vasanthi, Deepika's Mother
- Abdool Lee as Panda
- Rockstar Kamalesh as Santhosh, Saravanan and Kalpana's son
- Mahalakshmi Sudarshanan as Jennifer
- Dhanam as Judge Dhanam
- Nivedhitha Rajappan as Advocate Nivedhitha
- Nakkalites Chinnamuni as Neighbor
- Aroul D. Shankar as Finance Minister
- Arandhai Rajagopal as Finance Minister's assistant

== Production ==
On 11 December 2022, Nutmeg Productions officially announced their third production venture, which would be helmed by Sethum Aayiram Pon (2019) director Anand Ravichandran. The project would feature G. V. Prakash Kumar and Aishwarya Rajesh in the lead role, pairing opposite each other in the film, in their maiden pairing. The technical crew consisting of Prakash (as the music composer), cinematographer Jagadeesh Sundaramoorthy and editor Kripakaran was revealed along with the official stills of the muhurat puja held the same day in Chennai. The film's official title, DeAr, was announced on 4 May 2023, and uses the first two letters of the main characters, Deepika and Arjun. Shortly thereafter, the film drew comparisons with another forthcoming film Good Night due to a character's snoring problem being a major plot detail in both. Anand stated that he spoke to Manikandan, the lead actor of that film regarding this, adding, "Except for the fact that the films are about snoring, they are vastly different in terms of treatment. Ours is more commercial, and even visually, the treatment is different." According to Anand, most of the film was shot with sync sound; as he found it difficult to recreate "the beauty of drama" through dubbing. Principal photography began on 11 December 2022. After being predominantly shot in Chennai, principal photography wrapped on 1 August 2023. On 5 April 2024, with the release of the film's trailer, Kripakaran was revealed to have been replaced by Rukesh due to reasons unknown.

== Soundtrack ==
The music was composed by G. V. Prakash Kumar.

Track listing
No.	Title	Lyrics	Singer(s)	Length
1.	"Thalaivali"	Vinnulaga Kavi	G. V. Prakash Kumar	3:58
2.	"Maja Wedding"	Ekadesi	Anthony Daasan, Sindhuri Vishal	4:21
3.	"Sleeping Beauty"	Arivu	Santhosh Hariharan	4:50
4.	"My Dear Pondatti"	Vinnulaga Kavi	G. V. Prakash Kumar, Sivaangi Krishnakumar, Harsha Vardhan	2:59
5.	"Kannadi Nilave"	Karthik Netha	Ajay S Khashyap, Saindhavi	3:25
6.	"Nenjodu Nee" (male version)	GKB	Ravi G	3:28
7.	"Nenjodu Nee" (female version)	GKB	Saindhavi	3:15
Total length:				26:16

== Release ==
Dear was OTT released on 11 April 2024. The post-theatrical streaming rights of the film were bought by Netflix. The film began streaming there from 28 April 2024.

== Critical reception ==
Roopa Radhakrishnan of The Times of India rated the film 2/5 stars and wrote, "If there's one thing that DeAr strongly stands by and advocates for, it's that 'Time heals all wounds'. The film has a rather irksome take on marriage and divorce". Bhuvanesh Chandar from The Hindu wrote "Everything about this GV Prakash, Aishwarya Rajesh starrer feels utterly rushed, as if it was written chasing a strict deadline, or perhaps to save Prakash from the abysmal performances of his recent releases". Narayani M of The New Indian Express wrote, "Despite a brilliant premise in hand where multiple issues could be addressed, the film completely wastes this opportunity. Instead, we are given a film that lacks focus and holds onto too many emotions rather than exploring the central theme". Akchayaa Rajkumar of The News Minute wrote, "Despite little nuance and a rushed and easy resolution to a problem that plagued the young couple, DeAr is a fun watch and deserves praise for positive portrayals of several subjects that Tamil cinema has failed at earlier".
