= November Story =

Indian crime thriller series

- Genre: Crime thriller
- Written by: Indhra Subramanian
- Directed by: Indhra Subramanian
- Starring: Tamannaah Bhatia; G. M. Kumar; Pasupathy; Myna Nandhini
- Composer: Saran Raghavan
- Country of origin: India
- Original language: Tamil
- No. of seasons: 1
- No. of episodes: 7

Production
- Cinematography: Vidhu Ayyanna
- Editor: Sharan Govindsamy
- Running time: 30 - 52 minutes
- Production company: Vikatan Televistas

Original release
- Network: Disney+ Hotstar
- Release: 20 May 2021

November Story is an Indian Tamil-language crime thriller television series for Hotstar Specials, directed by Indhra Subramanian. Produced by Vikatan Televistas the series stars Tamannaah Bhatia in the lead role along with Pasupathy, G. M. Kumar and Myna Nandhini. The series is a classic murder mystery where the quest to find the truth behind the crime unveils a series of hidden truths. It was released on Disney+ Hotstar on 20 May 2021 and was declared a Streaming Blockbuster.

== Cast ==
- Tamannaah Bhatia as Anuradha Ganesan, Ganesan's elder daughter, an ethical hacker by profession
- G. M. Kumar as Ganesan, Anuradha and Mathi's father, a crime novel writer
- Pasupathy as Kuzhandhai Yesu, Mathi's foster father
  - Johnny as vicenarian Kuzhandhai Yesu
  - Ashwanth as young Kuzhandhai Yesu
- Namita Krishnamurthy as Mathi, Ganesan's biological younger daughter and Anuradha's younger sister; Kuzhandhai Yesu's adopted daughter
- Vivek Prasanna as Malarmannan, Anuradha's best friend
- Myna Nandhini as Chithra, Ganesan's caretaker
- Aruldoss as Inspector Sudalai
- Kimu Gopal as Kuzhandhai Yesu's assistant
- Janaki Suresh as Savitri, Mathi's caretaker
- Pujitha Devaraju as Neeta Ramchandhani
- Tharani Suresh Kumar as Sudar Ganesan, Ganesan's wife
- Arshath Feras as Binu
- K. Pooranesh as Ahmed
- Nishanth Naidu as Sandeep
- Supergood Subramani

== Episodes ==
| Episode | Title | Written & Directed by | Date of Broadcast |
|---|---|---|---|
| 1 | "Save Him From Him" | Indhra Subramanian | 20 May 2021 |
| 2 | "White Wash" | Indhra Subramanian | 20 May 2021 |
| 3 | "Flashes" | Indhra Subramanian | 20 May 2021 |
| 4 | "Crossroads" | Indhra Subramanian | 20 May 2021 |
| 5 | "Knitting" | Indhra Subramanian | 20 May 2021 |
| 6 | "Close To" | Indhra Subramanian | 20 May 2021 |
| 7 | "Truth" | Indhra Subramanian | 20 May 2021 |

== Production ==
=== Development ===
In November 2019, Vikatan Televistas, the television arm of the Tamil magazine Ananda Vikatan announced a streaming series for Disney+ Hotstar. Tentatively titled The November Story, the makers announced Indhra Subramanian as the director, while Tamannaah, Pasupathy M. and G. M. Kumar in prominent roles. Tamannaah stated about her digital debut stating that "the streaming platforms are also the new playground for accomplished actors looking to break grounds with more challenging roles outside the two-hour cinematic time-frame." She further added that about the character in the series "I love to get under the skin of characters I essay, and hence the longer web series [sic] format is the perfect medium to showcase my skills as it is almost like doing five films at one go. There are lots of detailing and one can explore the character in depth." In October 2020, Disney+ Hotstar announced the title of the series as November Story.

=== Filming ===
The shooting of the series began in early November 2019 and the first schedule of the series were completed within the end of the month. The team was able to film most of the series by March 2020 before the nationwide COVID-19 lockdown took place, although production and post-production of the series were affected by COVID-19 restrictions. The remaining portions were shot after lockdown and completed in January 2021.

== Release ==
Disney+ Hotstar released the teaser of the series on 24 October 2020, during the announcement of their original contents in Tamil language for the platform. The trailer of the series was released on 6 May 2021, through the YouTube channel of Cinema Vikatan, along with its dubbed Hindi and Telugu versions. The entire show comprising seven episodes, was broadcast exclusively on the streaming service on 20 May 2021 in Tamil and also dubbed in Telugu and Hindi languages.

== Reception ==
M. Suganth, editor-in-chief of The Times of India reviewed "The solid performances and production values of the series makes November Story engaging, despite its predictable arc." Ranjani Krishnakumar of Firstpost reviewed "November Story is an excellent entry into the pure-play murder mystery genre, but fails to deliver a satisfying pay-off." Haricharan Pudipeddi of Hindustan Times wrote "November Story unravels slowly, and its pace is an issue at times. But what keeps one engaged is the gripping screenplay that beautifully weaves together a web of incidents to produce something worthwhile. For the most part of the show, the writing is highly competent and one can’t find fault with until the climax which is needlessly long drawn."

Avinash Ramachandran of The New Indian Express wrote "November Story does score high on the engagement factor. Barring the final pay-off that is not exactly an organic culmination, the series largely works. There is a lot of activity, even if they don’t necessarily add up. The forced humour, in particular, fails to add any flavour." Nandini Ramanath of Scroll.in stated "Always slick but equally slippery, the severely overstretched and needlessly complicated series benefits from rich atmospherics and sharp performances."

Manoj Kumar R. in his review for The Indian Express praised the series as a "significant improvement compared to the current Tamil daily soaps on television", but labelled it as a "colossal disappointment" by the analysing the standards of web series. India Today's chief critic Janani K. reviewed it as "If not for its length and some logical loopholes, November Story could have been a great murder mystery." Film critic Srinivasa Ramanujam also gave a mixed verdict, in the review for The Hindu stating that the series "needed to pack in more punch in its core narrative."
