= Chand Sa Roshan Chehra =

2005 film by Shabah Shamsi

- Film poster
- Directed by: Shabah Shamsi
- Written by: Jalees Sherwani
- Screenplay by: Jalees Sherwani
- Produced by: Salim Akhtar
- Starring: Samir Aftab; Tamannaah Bhatia
- Cinematography: Karim Khatri
- Music by: Jatin–Lalit
- Distributed by: Aftab Pictures
- Release date: 4 March 2005
- Running time: 151 minutes
- Country: India
- Language: Hindi
- Budget: ₹1.50 crore
- Box office: ₹52.53 lakh

Chand Sa Roshan Chehra (transl. The Face That Glows Like the Moon) is a 2005 Indian Hindi-language romance film directed by Shabah Shamsi, written by Jalees Sherwani and produced by Salim Akhtar. It stars Samir Aftab and Tamannaah Bhatia (in her film debut) in the lead roles. The film's original score was composed by Jatin–Lalit, and the cinematography was handled by Karim Khatri.

Chand Sa Roshan Chehra was theatrically released worldwide on 4 March 2005. The film was critically panned and underperformed at the box office, earning ₹52.53 lakh against a budget of ₹1.50 crore.

== Plot ==
It's a teenage love story full of romance, emotions, and values. This is the story of Raj and Jiya, who loved each other from childhood. But circumstances take them apart a distance of seven seas, by Jiya's opportunist father Oberoi, who did not approve the alliance of his daughter Jiya with his friend Kapur's son Raj. Raj could not forget Jiya for even a day in his life. It was the last wish of Raj's mother that only Jiya should become her daughter-in-law. Kapur takes a promise from Raj that he will one day bring back Jiya as his daughter-in-law. One day, fate gives Raj a chance to go abroad to the same place where Jiya lives. Raj meets Jiya but both become enemies of each other without knowing that they have longed for each other, all their lives. Raj meets a beautiful girl Firdaus in the distant land and a friendship develops, which is not liked by Firdaus's fiancé Raj lands in trouble to be bailed out by Firdaus herself. During a youth festival, Raj wins the competition that infuriates Jiya, and she gets Raj beaten up by a local boy! Raj wants revenge and in the process, both of them come to know that they are each other's lost love.

But misunderstanding crops up and Jiya agrees to marry another boy, Rohit. During Jiya's engagement ceremony, Raj reaches and tries to convey his love to Jiya. Jiya is heartbroken and wants to break her engagement. Fate once again plays its own game and the lovers are again separated, because Oberoi learns that Raj is the same boy from whom he had taken Jiya away. How Jiya and Raj fight fate and destiny, and how both come together becomes the pivotal part of the story.

== Cast ==
- Samir Aftab as Raj Kapur
- Tamannaah Bhatia as Jiya Oberoi
- Himani Shivpuri
- Talat Aziz as Rajendran Kapur, Raj's father
- Kiran Kumar as Oberoi, Jiya's father
- Dilip Thadeshwar as Rohit
- Vijayendra Ghatge
- Kishori Shahane
- Apoorva Davda
- Firoz Khan
- Nirmal Soni
- Master Sonu
- Baby Shraddha

Cameo appearance

- Kurush Deboo as College Principal
- Rajni Chandra

== Music ==
The film's music was composed by Jatin and Lalit Pandit, with Sameer as the lyricist. There were a total of 8 songs in the film.

Original track list
No.	Title	Singer(s)	Length
1.	"Aage Aage Chahat Chali"	Udit Narayan
2.	"Doli Leke Aaye Hain"	Udit Narayan, Alka Yagnik
3.	"Doli Leke Aaye Hain (Sad)"	Udit Narayan
4.	"Jadugar Jadugar"	Udit Narayan, Sunidhi Chauhan
5.	"Pehli Nazar Ka Woh Pyar"	Udit Narayan, Alka Yagnik, Sunidhi Chauhan
6.	"Resham Se Bhi Nazuk Nazuk"	Udit Narayan
7.	"Woh Din Yaad Karlo Sanam"	Udit Narayan
8.	"Bechain Mera Dil Hai"	Udit Narayan, Alka Yagnik
9.	"Doli Leke Aaye Hain (Instrumental)"
10.	"Resham Se Bhi Nazuk Nazuk (Instrumental)"

== Release ==
Chand Sa Roshan Chehra was theatrically released on 60 screens worldwide on 4 March 2005.

== Reception ==
=== Critical response ===
Chand Sa Roshan Chehra received negative reviews from the critics.

=== Box office ===
On its opening day, Chand Sa Roshan Chehra collected ₹7 lakh and grossed ₹28 lakh by the end of the first week. Throughout its theatrical run, the film grossed ₹52.53 lakh.
