= 11th Hour (TV series) =

Indian crime thriller series

- Poster
- Genre: Crime thriller
- Based on: 8 Hours
- Written by: Pradeep Uppalapati
- Directed by: Praveen Sattaru
- Starring: Tamannaah Bhatia
- Music by: Bharatt-Saurabh
- Country of origin: India
- Original language: Telugu
- No. of seasons: 1
- No. of episodes: 8

Production
- Producer: Pradeep Uppalapati
- Cinematography: Mukesh Gnanesh
- Editor: Dharmendra Kakarala
- Running time: 19 - 34 minutes
- Production company: Introupe Online

Original release
- Network: aha
- Release: 8 April 2021

11th Hour is an Indian Telugu-language crime thriller television series created by Introupe Online for aha, directed by Praveen Sattaru, starring Tamannaah Bhatia in the lead role. The series is based on Upendra Namburi's book 8 Hours, in which the protagonist Aratrika Reddy (Tamannaah) faces a multi-layered high-stakes boardroom challenge that unfolds in a single night.

The series was initially scheduled for release in January 2021, but COVID-19 restrictions caused it to be delayed to 8 April 2021.

== Synopsis ==
Aditya Group of Companies, which invented a source of clean energy and is led by Aratrika Reddy, is on the verge of being forced into bankruptcy as the result of a political conspiracy. With the company required to deposit more than ₹9,000 crore to the Imperial Bank by 8 AM, the next dawn, to secure its salvation, Aratrika's ex-husband, Siddharth Singh, competitor Rajvardhan Rathore, Imperial Bank president Sundar Das, and Prince Sadiq, a sheikh from Dubai, make financial proposals to Aratrika, who turns them all down and holds out hope, for a miracle, before sunrise to save Aditya Group of Companies.

== Cast ==
- Tamannaah Bhatia as Aratrika Reddy
- Adith Arun as Peter D'Cruz
- Vamsi Krishna as Siddharth Kumar
- Roshni Prakash as Ragini
- Shatru as Rajvardhan Rathore
- Madhusudhan Rao as Madhusudhan Reddy
- Jayaprakash as Jagannath Reddy
- Pavithra Lokesh as Gayatri Reddy
- Anirudh Balaji as Prince Sadiq
- Vinay Nallakadi as Santosh
- Abhijeeth Poondla as Vikram
- Srikanth Iyyengar as Sundar Das
- Priya Banerjee as Nora
- Ravi Varma as Gajendra Singh Rathore
- Avinash Kanaparthi as Avinash Reddy
- Mahati Bhikshu as Shabnam
- Keshav Deepak as ACP Ram Reddy
- Rajiv Kumar Aneja as Defence Minister Nayak

== Episodes ==
Episode	Title	Directed By	Written By	Date of Broadcast
1	"Red Riding Hood"	Praveen Sattaru	Pradeep Uppalapati	April 8, 2021
2	"Memoirs of Aratrika"	Praveen Sattaru	Pradeep Uppalapati	April 8, 2021
3	"Haunting Past"	Praveen Sattaru	Pradeep Uppalapati	April 8, 2021
4	"First Blood"	Praveen Sattaru	Pradeep Uppalapati	April 8, 2021
5	"Beginning of the End"	Praveen Sattaru	Pradeep Uppalapati	April 8, 2021
6	"Betrayal"	Praveen Sattaru	Pradeep Uppalapati	April 8, 2021
7	"The Sinner"	Praveen Sattaru	Pradeep Uppalapati	April 8, 2021
8	"The Big Bad Wolf"	Praveen Sattaru	Pradeep Uppalapati	April 8, 2021

== Production ==
Pradeep Uppalapati wrote the script for 11th Hour, after which aha green-lit the series as part of its aha originals. Praveen Sattaru selected as the director. Tamannaah appeared in the lead role. With Tamannaah on board, the director chose a supporting cast that can also hold attention, comprising Jayaprakash, Madhusudhan, Arun Adith, Vamsi Krishna and Srikanth Iyengar. The series was shot over 33 days with a team of 30-40 members, who were tested six times for COVID-19. Most portions were filmed in a hotel when occupancy was low because of the pandemic. A few prologue scenes were filmed in other places.

== Release ==
The entire show, comprising eight episodes, was broadcast exclusively on the aha streaming service on 8 April 2021.

== Reception ==
Hemanth Kumar of Firstpost rated the series 2.5/5 and wrote: "11th Hour has scale, grandeur, and a solid premise but fails to keep one hooked to the story." While the motivations of the characters are established, Kumar felt that the narration was not compelling enough. A. Kameshwari in her The Indian Express review stated: "The makers of 11th Hour, a corporate drama, try too hard to make the series interesting but in vain." She felt that the audience could not connect with the character of Tamannaah as it was kept half baked.

Times of India critic Sravan Vanaparthy rated the series 3/5 stars and wrote: "11th Hour is refreshing in the sense that it explores the trials and tribulations faced by a woman who’s looking to make it big in a man’s world." India Today editor Janani.K called Tamannaah the saviour of "this bland thriller." "As a single mom, chairman of a company and caring daughter, Tamannaah has done her best. But, her efforts go waste as the writing lacks nuance," she added.
