= Aa Bb Kk =

2018 film by Ramkumar Shedge

- Directed by: Ramkumar Shedge
- Story by: Aba Gaikwad
- Produced by: Mihir Sudhir Kulkarni
- Starring: Mythili Patwardhan; Sahil Joshi
- Cinematography: Mahesh Aney
- Music by: Sajid–Wajid; Bapi–Tutul
- Release date: 8 June 2018
- Running time: 121 minutes
- Country: India
- Language: Marathi

Aa Bb Kk is a 2018 Indian Marathi-language feature film written by Aba Gaikwad and directed by Ramkumar Shedge and produced by Meehir Kulkarni. The film is based on social subject. It marks the debut film of Tamannaah Bhatia, Suniel Shetty and Nawazuddin Siddiqui in Marathi cinema.

== Plot ==
A tragic tale of a girl Jani, who is branded as a curse by the society after her mother dies while giving birth. The film revolves around the hardships she and her brother Hari face in their day-to-day life.

== Cast ==
- Baby Mythili Patwardhan as Jani
- Nawazuddin Siddiqui
- Master Sunny Pawar as Margya
- Master Sahil Joshi as Hari
- Vijay Patkar as Peon
- Ravi Kishan
- Tanvi Sinha
- Divya Shetty

Cameo appearance

- Tamannaah Bhatia as Tamannaji
- Suniel Shetty as Bapa

== Music ==
Track list
No.	Title	Lyrics	Artist(s)	Length
1.	"Bappa Bappa"	Kaushal Kishore	Raja Hasan	2:52
2.	"Pichkari Maro Khelo Holi"	Sajid	Wajid, Danish Sabri	2:33
3.	"Pethuni Uthu De Aaj Ek"	Ashawini Shende	Amruta Fadnavis	2:11
4.	"Ovalla Jiv Hith"	Vandana Saigaonkar (female)		3:31

== Reception ==
The Times of India rated the film 3 out of 5 stars.
