= Plan A Plan B =

2022 Indian film by Shashanka Ghosh

- Official release poster
- Directed by: Shashanka Ghosh
- Written by: Rajat Arora
- Produced by: Trilok Malhotra; K. R. Harish; Rajat Arora
- Starring: Riteish Deshmukh; Tamannaah Bhatia
- Cinematography: Jaya Krishna Gummadi
- Music by: Songs: Bann Chakraborty; Yug Bhusal; Background Score: Bann Chakraborty
- Production companies: India Stories Media & Entertainment Pvt Ltd; Funk Your Blues Entertainment Pvt Ltd
- Distributed by: Netflix
- Release date: 30 September 2022
- Running time: 106 minutes
- Country: India
- Language: Hindi

Plan A Plan B is a 2022 Indian Hindi-language romantic comedy film starring Riteish Deshmukh and Tamannaah Bhatia; directed by Shashanka Ghosh and written by Rajat Arora. It premiered on Netflix on 30 September 2022.

== Synopsis ==
Nirali's mother is a matchmaker. In one of her arranged marriages, Nirali's mother announces her retirement and hands over the business to Nirali. She also tells Nirali that she has already booked a shared working space and paid for it for a year. On the day she moves in, she finds out that her office is right next to the office of Kaustubh 'Kosty' Chogule, a divorce lawyer. Now both of them have to live in a shared spaced office while interacting with each other.

== Cast ==
- Riteish Deshmukh as Adv. "Kosty" Kaustubh Chougule
- Tamannaah Bhatia as Dr. Nirali Vora
- Kusha Kapila as Seema
- Poonam Dhillon as Kiran Vora
- Pooja Singh as Taruna
- Bidita Bag as Mrs Runjhun Chougule
- Heli Vyas as Serena
- Neeta Mohindra as "Pussy" Pushpa aunty
- Dilshad Patel as Preeti

== Music ==
Plan A Plan B

Soundtrack album by Bann Chakraborty, Yug Bhusal
- Genre: Feature film soundtrack
- Length: 12:01
- Language: Hindi
- Label: Netflix Music

Bann Chakraborty composed the film's background score and the songs "Talli" and "Keh Do Ke", while Yug Bhusal composed "Dil Hoya Jogiya".

=== Original soundtrack ===
No.	Title	Lyrics	Singer(s)	Length
1.	"Talli"	Ginny Diwan	Bann Chakraborty, Sunidhi Chauhan	03:38
2.	"Keh Do Ke"	Ankur Tewari	Vivek Hariharan, Mali, Bann Chakraborty	03:45
3.	"Dil Hoya Jogiya"	Yug Bhusal	Saurabh Das	04:38
Total length:				12:01

== Release ==
The film released on 30 September 2022 via Netflix.

== Reception ==
On the review aggregator website Rotten Tomatoes, 17% of 6 critics' reviews are positive, with an average rating of 4.2/10.

Saibal Chatterji of NDTV wrote, "Plan A Plan B is a rom-com that skims the surface of matters of the heart as men and women, whether entering into matrimony or opting out of it, negotiate the sharp bends on the way. The film potters around without much of a roadmap. The result is a flimsy affair that leaves far too much to the actors to salvage". Shubhra Gupta of The Indian Express wrote, "I had hopes that there would be some zest to the proceedings [...] But as soon as the attraction-despite-everything arc begins, the film turns decisively tepid and flat". Archika Khurana of The Times of India wrote, "For people to believe that "opposites attract," this 106-minute film is as formulaic as it is ambitious".
