= Jee Karda =

2023 series by Arunima Sharma

- Genre: Romance; Drama
- Written by: Arunima Sharma; Hussain Dalal; Abbas Dalal
- Directed by: Arunima Sharma
- Starring: Tamannaah Bhatia; Suhail Nayyar; Aashim Gulati; Anya Singh; Simone Singh
- Composer: Sachin-Jigar
- Country of origin: India
- Original language: Hindi
- No. of seasons: 1
- No. of episodes: 8

Production
- Producer: Dinesh Vijan
- Cinematography: Mahendra J. Shetty
- Editors: Dipika Kalra; Neha Mehra
- Running time: 29 - 39 minutes
- Production company: Maddock Films

Original release
- Network: Amazon Prime Video
- Release: 15 June 2023

Jee Karda (transl. 'Feeling like') is a 2023 Indian Hindi-language romantic drama television series for Amazon Prime Video, directed by Arunima Sharma. Produced by Maddock Films, the series stars Tamannaah Bhatia, Suhail Nayyar, Aashim Gulati, and Anya Singh in the lead roles.

Jee Karda was released on Amazon Prime Video on 15 June 2023. For her notable performance in the series, Tamannaah received the Best Actor of the Year - Female (Series) award (Note: Tied with Aakhri Sach.) at the Bollywood Hungama OTT India Fest.

== Synopsis ==
The series delves into the lives of seven childhood friends. Together, they shared a belief that by the time they all turned 30, their lives would be perfectly sorted and in harmony with their dreams and aspirations. However, as their milestone birthday arrives, they come face-to-face with the harsh reality that life does not always go as planned.

== Cast ==
- Tamannaah Bhatia as Lavanya Singh
- Suhail Nayyar as Rishabh Rathore
- Aashim Gulati as Arjun Gill
- Anya Singh as Preet Chuharmalani
- Hussain Dalal as Shahid Ansari
- Samvedna Suwalka as Sheetal Kotadiya
- Sayan Banerjee as Melroy D'Monte
- Malhar Thakar as Sameer Kotadiya
- Simone Singh as Antara Singh, Lavanya's mother
- Kira Narayanan as Aayat
- Vedant Sinha as Young Shahid
- Chahat Tewani as Young Lavanya
- Ayaan Zubair Rehmani as Young Arjun
- Varun Buddhadev as Young Rishabh

== Episodes ==
Episode	Title	Directed By	Date of Broadcast
1	"Will you marry me?"	Arunima Sharma	15 June 2023
2	"Baby Tu Toh Shark Hai"	Arunima Sharma	15 June 2023
3	"Feel it, Fight it"	Arunima Sharma	15 June 2023
4	"Blood Moon"	Arunima Sharma	15 June 2023
5	"Jawaniyaan"	Arunima Sharma	15 June 2023
6	"Yaar Ki Shaadi"	Arunima Sharma	15 June 2023
7	"Stardust"	Arunima Sharma	15 June 2023
8	"The Big 30"	Arunima Sharma	15 June 2023

== Music ==
Jee Karda

Soundtrack album by Sachin-Jigar
- Released: 8 June 2023
- Genre: Web series soundtrack
- Length: 21:08
- Label: T-Series

Official audio
- Jee Karda - Jukebox on YouTube

The songs are composed by Sachin-Jigar. The lyrics are written by Jigar Saraiya, Rashmeet Kaur, Simran Chaudhary, IP Singh and Mellow D.

No.	Title	Lyrics	Music	Singer(s)	Length
1.	"Jee Karda - Title Track"	Jigar Saraiya, Rashmeet Kaur		Rashmeet Kaur	2:39
2.	"Ammiye"	Simran Chaudhary	Sachin-Jigar	Simran Chaudhary	4:17
3.	"Yaar Di Shaadi"	IP Singh	Sachin-Jigar	IP Singh	3:03
4.	"Jawaniyaan"	Jigar Saraiya, Mellow D	Sachin-Jigar	Varun Jain, Mannuni Desai, Mellow D	3:44
5.	"Stardust"	IP Singh	Sachin-Jigar	IP singh, Rashmeet Kaur	2:21
6.	"Ro Lehn De"	Jigar Saraiya	Sachin-Jigar	The Rish	2:35
7.	"Rehn De"	Jigar Saraiya, Mellow D	Sachin-Jigar	Mellow D	2:28
Total length:					21:08

== Release ==
Amazon Prime Video released the announcement video of the series on 2 June 2023 and trailer on 5 June 2023. Prior to its official release, Amazon Prime Video organized a private premiere of the show, exclusively for a selected audience. The streaming service premiered the series on 15 June 2023.

== Reception ==
=== Critical response ===
Archika Khurana, a reviewer from Times of India, gave "Jee Karda" a rating of 3.5 out of 5 stars. Khurana described the show as a heartfelt coming-of-age drama that follows a close-knit group of childhood friends as they navigate adulthood. The strengths of the show were highlighted as its lively performances and captivating vibe, which made it an enjoyable guilty pleasure to watch. While Khurana appreciated the strong bond among the characters, they felt that adding more depth to each character would have enhanced the audience's connection. Tamannaah Bhatia's portrayal of Lavanya received praise, along with the performances of the ensemble cast. The series' Mumbai setting, cinematography by Mahendra Shetty, and music by Sachin Jigar were also positively noted by the critic.

Alaka Sahani, writing for The Indian Express, praised the series for its exploration of modern relationships and the believable camaraderie among the cast. However, Sahani pointed out that the high drama in the narrative didn't always have the desired impact. They suggested that the series should prioritize substance over style and delve deeper into the concerns of today's youth to create a more compelling story.

Zinia Bandyopadhyay, a reviewer from India Today, gave "Jee Karda" a rating of 2.5 out of 5 stars. While the performances of the cast, especially Tamannaah Bhatia, Suhail Nayyar, and Aashim Gulati, were praised, the script was criticized for being weak and lacking consistent character development. The non-linear storytelling format initially caused confusion, but the series improved in the latter half. The seamless integration of Sachin-Jigar's background score with the narrative was appreciated.

Saibal Chatterjee of NDTV rated with 2 out of 5 stars and wrote "Jee Karda examines the repercussions of youthful excess and exuberance. It does so without coming up with anything that might be described as startlingly revelatory." Chatterjee praised the performances of the cast, including Tamannaah Bhatia, Aashim Gulati, and Suhail Nayyar. But she criticized the series for its failure to effectively explore the complexities of love and longing. She considered the plot as overcrowded, lacking substance and with a lack of fresh ideas.

Critic Deepa Gahlot reviewed the series for Rediff.com and wrote "Jee Karda is a dish with a lot of garnish, but no flavour." She gave the series a rating of 2.5/5 and described it as visually appealing but lacking emotional depth.She felt that the characters' narcissism and reliance on parties and sexual encounters made it difficult to connect with them. Despite a standout performance by Aashim Gulati, the series fell short of delivering a satisfying and meaningful experience.

=== Accolades ===
Award	Year	Category	Recipient	Result	Ref.
Bollywood Hungama OTT India Fest	2023	Best Actor of The Year Female (Series)	Tamannaah Bhatia	Won	
