= Aakhri Sach =

2023 series by Robbie Grewal

- Poster
- Genre: Crime fiction
- Based on: Burari deaths
- Written by: Saurav Dey; Nilansh Mehta
- Directed by: Robbie Grewal
- Starring: Tamannaah Bhatia; Abhishek Banerjee; Shivin Narang; Gehna Seth; Nikhil Nanda; Rahul Bagga
- Country of origin: India
- Original language: Hindi
- No. of seasons: 1
- No. of episodes: 6

Production
- Producers: Preeti Simoes; Neeti Simoes; Nikhil Nanda
- Editor: Rajesh G. Pandey
- Running time: 31–50 minutes
- Production company: Nirvikar Films

Original release
- Network: Disney+ Hotstar
- Release: 25 August – 22 September 2023

Aakhri Sach (transl. Final truth) is a 2023 Indian Hindi-language crime investigative thriller television series on Disney+ Hotstar, directed by Robbie Grewal. Produced by Nirvikar Films, the series stars Tamannaah Bhatia in the lead role along with Abhishek Banerjee, Shivin Narang, Gehna Seth, Nikhil Nanda and Rahul Bagga. The series is loosely based on the Burari deaths, with Tamannaah playing the role of the lead investigative officer, Anya.

Aakhri Sach was broadcast from 25 August to 22 September 2023. The series was well-received by audiences, and Tamannaah's notable performance earned her the Best Actor of the Year - Female (Series) award (Note: Tied with Jee Karda.) at the Bollywood Hungama OTT India Fest.

== Plot ==
The series commences by introducing Anya, a determined police officer, as she successfully apprehends a cunning individual involved in a credit card scam. However, her trajectory takes a somber shift when her superior assigns her to investigate a perplexing case where 11 family members have tragically died together. Initially appearing as a collective act of suicide, the situation becomes progressively eerie as Anya probes further into the circumstances.

As the story unfolds, the show employs flashbacks to unveil the Rajawat family's past. The family's patriarch, a former police officer, conceals a shadowed history. The seemingly trivial incident involving his son, Bhuvan, emerges as a pivotal event that contributed to his downfall.

At the heart of the narrative are the Rajawat siblings: Aadesh, Bhuvan, Babita, and Karuna. The unsettling incident transpires a mere week after Babita's daughter, Anshika, becomes engaged. Initial suspicions focus on Aman, Anshika's fiancé, as investigators strive to decode the riddle surrounding the family's tragic demise. Yet, the tale's layers are intricate, uncovering that there is more beneath the surface.

As the series advances, the story weaves a tapestry of the past and present, painting a haunting portrait of a family burdened by secrets, unforeseen turns, and concealed motives. The quest for the truth evolves into a psychological exploration, compelling the characters to confront their own inner conflicts while untangling the enigma shrouding the Rajawat family.

== Cast ==
- Tamannaah Bhatia as Inspector Anya Swaroop
- Abhishek Banerjee as "Lalit" Bhuvan
- Shivin Narang as Aman
- Gehna Seth as Karuna
- Nikhil Nanda as Ashish Negi
- Rahul Bagga as Raghav
- Nishu Dikshit as Poonam
- Danish Iqbal as "Bhuvnesh" Aadesh
- Kriti Vij as "Priyanka" Anshika
- Firdaus Hassan as Subodh
- Salim Siddiqui as Iqbal
- Sanjiv Chopra as Jawahar Singh
- Pratik Sehajpal (cameo)

== Episodes ==
Episode	Title	Directed By	Written By	Date of Broadcast
1	"Breaking News: Ek Rahasya"	Robbie Grewal	Saurav Dey	25 August 2023
The city of Delhi awakens to a chilling report of an entire family of eleven members discovered deceased. Absent of any suicide note or indications of familial issues, Inspector Anya is inclined to consider the possibility of foul play.
2	"Guilty Heart: Ek Saaya"	Robbie Grewal	Saurav Dey	25 August 2023
Bhuvan Rajawat, one of the late brothers, carried a haunting tragic history. Now, Anya is faced with two potential suspects for investigation: the fiancé of a deceased woman and a notorious criminal gang.
3	"Shadows of the Past: Vahem"	Robbie Grewal	Saurav Dey	1 September 2023
Aman's journey to Teetari village uncovers surprising truths, while Anya's investigation reveals shocking information about the Rajawats. Bhuvan's unexpected encounter with fate astonishes his family.
4	"Blurring the Lines: Ardh Satya"	Robbie Grewal	Saurav Dey	8 September 2023
Anya discovers the unusual lifestyle of the Rajawat family and Bhuvan's significant impact on them through the revelations of Chamatkari Baba. Simultaneously, Aman's inquiry uncovers unexpected findings.
5	"Revelations: Khulasa"	Robbie Grewal	Saurav Dey	15 September 2023
After their initial triumphs, the family begins to encounter challenges once more. Bhuvan discloses the strategies left behind by his deceased father, while Anya's investigation uncovers concealed hints about the Rajawats.
6	"Final Countdown: Sadhana"	Robbie Grewal	Saurav Dey	22 September 2023
Following Bhuvan's revelation to the family about the solution to their problems, they begin to ponder the associated expenses. It is only when Anya unearths the truth that her world is profoundly rattled.

== Release ==
Disney+ Hotstar released the trailer of the series on 11 August 2023. Before its official release, they organized a private premiere of the show exclusively for a selected audience. The streaming service broadcast the six-episode series in languages including Hindi, Tamil, Telugu, Marathi, Bengali, Kannada, and Malayalam from 25 August to 22 September 2023.

== Accolades ==
Award	Year	Category	Recipient	Result	Ref.
Bollywood Hungama OTT India Fest	2023	Best Actor of The Year Female (Series)	Tamannaah Bhatia	Won	
