= Tamannaah Bhatia =

Indian actress (born 1989)

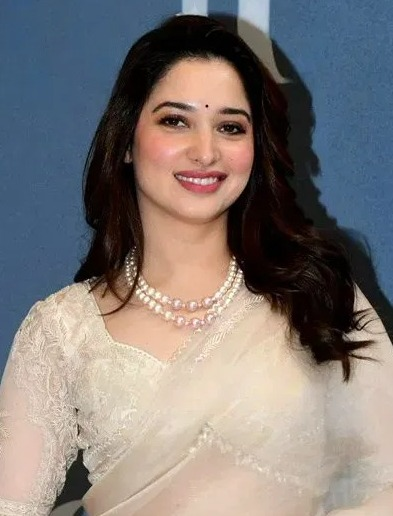
- Bhatia in 2026
- Born: Tamanna Santosh Bhatia; 21 December 1989 (age 36); Bombay, Maharashtra, India
- Occupation: Actress
- Years active: 2005–present
- Works: Full list
- Awards: Full list

Tamanna Santosh Bhatia (born 21 December 1989), better known as Tamannaah Bhatia (pronounced [ˈtəmənːaː ˈbʱaːʈijaː]), is an Indian actress who predominantly works in Tamil, Telugu and Hindi films. Having appeared in 89 films, she is recognized as a leading actress in South Indian cinema and has received several awards, including three Santosham Film Awards, two SIIMA Awards and the Kalaimamani Award.

== Early life ==
Tamanna Santosh Bhatia was born on 21 December 1989 in Bombay (now Mumbai), India. Her parents are Santosh and Rajni Bhatia. She has an elder brother named Anand Bhatia. She is of Sindhi Hindu origin and attended Maneckji Cooper Education Trust School in Mumbai. At the age of 13, she began learning acting and joined Prithvi Theatre for a year, where she participated in stage performances. She initially used her given name as her stage name but later altered it to "Tamannaah" for numerological reasons after gaining initial experience in the film industry. Over time, she began using her surname as well, adopting "Tamannaah Bhatia" as her stage name.

== Career ==
=== 2005–2014: Early work, success and recognition ===
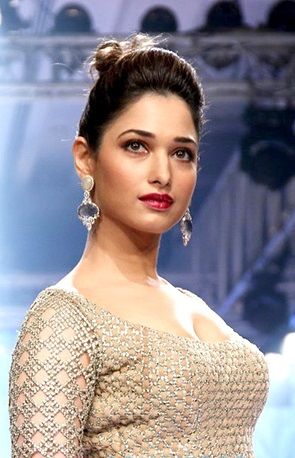
Bhatia at the 2015 Lakmé Fashion Week.

Tamannaah Bhatia made her acting debut as the female lead in the Hindi film Chand Sa Roshan Chehra in 2005, which underperformed at the box office. That year, she entered Telugu cinema with Sree and, in 2006, Tamil cinema with Kedi. In 2007, Viyabari underperformed at the box office, but her performance earned critical acclaim. She gained recognition with Happy Days and Kalloori, where her roles as a college student were well-received, and both films achieved box office success, establishing her as a leading actress in Telugu and Tamil cinema. In 2008, Kalidasu made a strong impact in Telugu cinema.

In 2009, her role in the Tamil film Padikkadavan earned praise despite mixed reviews for the film itself. Konchem Ishtam Konchem Kashtam received critical acclaim but moderate box office success. Ayan was a box office success, while Ananda Thandavam underperformed despite her acclaimed performance. Kanden Kadhalai earned her praise and a South Scope award. In 2010, her Tamil road movie Paiyaa received positive reviews and commercial success, but Sura and Thillalangadi underperformed.

In 2011, Bhatia starred in the Tamil film Siruthai, where her role faced criticism, though the film was a commercial success. Badrinath had mixed reviews but was commercially successful. Venghai received mixed critical reception, while Oosaravelli was a box office success, with her performance praised. Her Telugu film 100% Love, opposite Naga Chaitanya, where she played a college student, achieved acclaim and box office success, earning her the CineMAA Award and Santosham Award for Best Actress. In 2012, her Telugu film Racha achieved commercial success, with her performance lauded. Endukante Premanta and Rebel underperformed, though her acting was praised. Cameraman Gangatho Rambabu featured her in a tomboyish role and was a box office success.

In 2013, Bhatia's Hindi film Himmatwala opposite Ajay Devgn, underperformed at the box office. Her Telugu film Tadakha, where she played the bride’s sister opposite Naga Chaitanya, was a commercial success. A The Times of India critic noted, "Tamannaah carries off the glam act with ease." Alongside several nominations, the film earned her the SIIMA Critics Award for Best Actress – Telugu. In 2014, her Tamil film Veeram was a commercial success, while the Hindi comedy film Humshakals opposite Saif Ali Khan underperformed. Her subsequent releases that year, the Hindi film Entertainment opposite Akshay Kumar, and Telugu film Aagadu opposite Mahesh Babu, both underperformed at the box office. Additionally, she appeared in the music video "Lafzo Mein" from the album Aapka... Abhijeet Sawant in 2005, performed cameos in Ready and Netru Indru Naalai in 2008, and Ko in 2011, and performed the special song "Labbar Bomma" in Alludu Seenu in 2014.

=== 2015–2019: Established actress ===
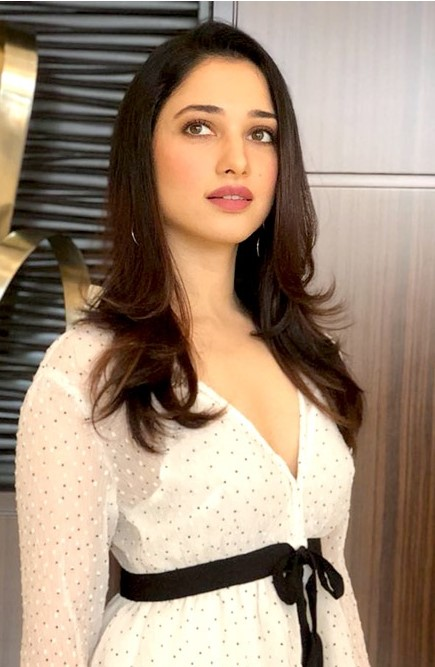
Bhatia at an event in 2018

Tamannaah Bhatia reached a turning point in her career in 2015. Her portrayal of the warrior Avanthika in Baahubali: The Beginning opposite Prabhas, earned her widespread acclaim, and the film’s box office success, as one of the highest grossing Telugu films, boosted her career with diverse role opportunities. The Hindu critic Sangeetha Devi Dundoo found her "impressive". Vasuvum Saravananum Onna Padichavanga received negative reviews. In Bengal Tiger, she played a chief minister’s daughter opposite Ravi Teja, achieving box office success.

In 2016, her roles in Oopiri and Dharma Durai received positive reviews, with the latter achieving box office success and earning her the Asiavision Award for Best Actress – Tamil. She starred in the short film Ranveer Ching Returns, which was well-received. Her trilingual comedy horror film Devi earned positive reviews, with her double role praised, contributing to its box office success. She won the Asianet Film Award for Most Popular Tamil Actress and a Sify critic noted that she "carries the film" with her double act. However, Kaththi Sandai, received mixed reviews.

In 2017, Bhatia reprised Avanthika in Baahubali 2: The Conclusion, which received positive reviews and became one of the highest-grossing Indian films. In contrast, Anbanavan Asaradhavan Adangadhavan had mixed reviews and underperformed at the box office. In 2018, her action thriller Sketch received mixed reviews, but her role was noted positively. The Marathi film Aa Bb Kk earned positive reviews. Her Telugu films Naa Nuvve and Next Enti? both received mixed reviews and underperformed at the box office.

In 2019, Bhatia's Telugu film F2: Fun and Frustration achieved box office success as one of the highest grossing Telugu films of the year. Playing a dominating wife opposite Venkatesh, she won her second Santosham Best Actress Award. Hemanth Kumar CR of Firstpost stated that she "shines" in her role. Her Tamil film Kanne Kalaimaane had mixed reviews, but Srinivasa Ramanujam noted that she makes a "strong statement" through her performance, earning her the Best Actress award at Indo-French International Film Festival. Devi 2 received a lukewarm response, though her acting was noted. Khamoshi had poor reviews, but her performance was praised.

The epic historical action film Sye Raa Narasimha Reddy received positive reviews, with her role contributing to its success. Her performance in the Tamil comedy horror Petromax was noted, despite criticism for the script. Action received mixed reviews and underperformed at the box office. She also appeared in cameos in Nannbenda and Size Zero in 2015, and performed the special songs including "Bachelor Babu" in Speedunnodu and "Sampige / Mandara Thailam" in the Telugu-Kannada bilingual Jaguar in 2016, "Swing Zara" in Jai Lava Kusa in 2017, and "Jokae" in KGF: Chapter 1 in 2018.

=== 2020–2024: TV-Theatrical balance ===
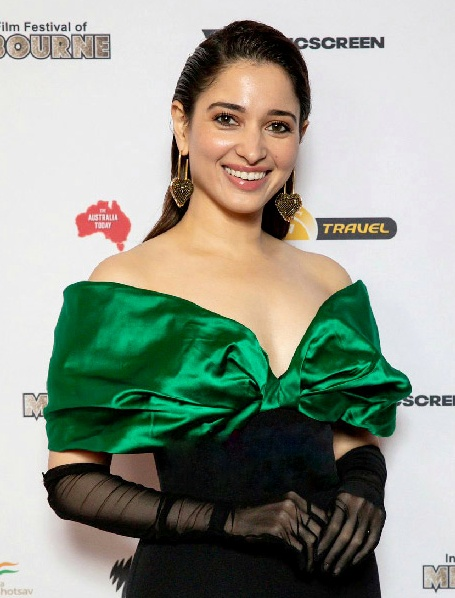
Bhatia at an event in 2022

In 2021, Tamannaah Bhatia starred in the TV series 11th Hour, which received mixed reviews, though her intense performance was praised. Her role in November Story earned praise, despite criticism for excessive dialogue. She hosted MasterChef India – Telugu and starred in the Telugu sports film Seetimaarr, earning audience praise as a coach. The Telugu thriller Maestro on Disney+ Hotstar received positive reviews for its storyline and her performance.

In 2022, the Telugu comedy F3: Fun and Frustration featured her in a well-received role, achieving box office success. Babli Bouncer on Disney+ Hotstar, where she played a bouncer, received mixed reviews. Her performance in Netflix's Plan A Plan B was noted, despite a predictable plot. The romantic drama Gurthunda Seethakalam received mixed reviews.

In 2023, Bhatia starred in the Amazon Prime Video romantic drama series Jee Karda as Lavanya, with India Today's Zinia Bandyopadhyay noting, "Tamannaah gives an easy-breezy performance. She is effortless and brings out of the dilemma of her character beautifully." In Netflix’s Lust Stories 2, her performance as Shanti was praised. Her supporting role in the Tamil film Jailer contributed to its box office success. The Telugu film Bhola Shankar received negative reviews and underperformed. Her Malayalam debut, Bandra, received mixed reviews and underperformed. She played a police officer in Aakhri Sach, a Disney+ Hotstar thriller series which received positive reviews. Her performance in Jee Karda and Aakhri Sach earned her the Best Actress - Series at the Bollywood Hungama OTT India Fest.

In 2024, Bhatia starred in the Tamil comedy horror film Aranmanai 4 as Selvi, a protective mother and fearsome spirit. Her performance received praise, contributing to the film’s status as one of the highest grossing Tamil films of the year. She appeared in the Netflix documentary Nayanthara: Beyond the Fairytale. In the Netflix thriller Sikandar Ka Muqaddar, she played a single mother accused of theft, and Hindustan Times critic Rishabh Suri noted that she "lends good support to the story". Additionally, she performed in the music video "Tabahi" from the album Retropanda in 2022, the special song "Daang Daang" in Sarileru Neekevvaru in 2020, "Kodthe" in Ghani in 2022, and made cameos in Stree 2 and Vedaa in 2024.

=== 2025–present: Further progression ===
Bhatia starred in the 2025 Telugu supernatural thriller Odela 2, portraying a Shiva devotee. The film underperformed at the box office but was well-received by OTT audiences. She performed the special song "Nasha" in the Hindi crime thriller film Raid 2. She also starred alongside Diana Penty in the Amazon Prime series Do You Wanna Partner, and Shweta Keshri of India Today observed, "Tamannaah delivers a spirited performance as Shikha, a passionate, driven character who will go to any length to make her beer a reality." She performed in the "Ghafoor" music video, a song released to promote The Ba***ds of Bollywood, but not included in the series. She reprised her role as Avanthika in the film Baahubali: The Epic, a re-edited single-film version of the original Baahubali saga, directed by S. S. Rajamouli.

In 2026, Bhatia starred in the Hindi film O'Romeo, an action thriller with Shahid Kapoor and Avinash Tiwary. Following this she played wife of a city-dwelling man who returns to his ancestral village in The Vvaan: Force of the Forrest opposite Siddharth Malhotra. The film is inspired by the folklore of Van Devi Temple, Bihta, Patna. Rishabh Suri of Hindustan Times felt she lend the film its, "emotional core". She will next appear in the action film Ranger with Ajay Devgn and Sanjay Dutt, and IPS Maria opposite John Abraham

== Filmography ==
Tamannaah Bhatia has appeared in 89 films and is one of the highest-paid actresses in South Indian cinema. She began her career with 2005 romance film Chand Sa Roshan Chehra and later entered Telugu and Tamil cinema. Bhatia gained recognition with Happy Days and Kalloori. Her notable films include Ayan, 100% Love and Baahubali: The Beginning. Her performances in Baahubali 2: The Conclusion, Dharma Durai and Aranmanai 4 were well received.

== Accolades ==
In 2010, Tamannaah Bhatia received the Kalaimamani from the Government of Tamil Nadu for her achievements in the fields of art and literature. She won the Santosham Best Actress Award for her performance in 100% Love and the SIIMA Critics Award for Best Actress – Telugu for her performance in Tadakha. In 2017, Bhatia was awarded an honorary doctorate from the Confederation of International Accreditation Commission for her contributions to Indian cinema. Her role in F2: Fun and Frustration earned her the Santosham Best Actress Award for the second time, and she also received several nominations at the Filmfare Awards South.

== Other works ==
Tamannaah Bhatia has pursued diverse ventures beyond acting. In the early 2010s, she modelled for television commercials, including Fanta and Chandrika Ayurvedic soap. In March 2015, she represented Zee Telugu and launched her jewellery brand, Wite & Gold. In January 2016, she endorsed the Beti Bachao Beti Padhao campaign. She performed at the Indian Premier League opening ceremonies in 2018 and 2023.

Bhatia co-wrote Back to the Roots with Luke Coutinho, published by Penguin Random House India in August 2021. In September 2022, she joined Sugar Cosmetics as an equity partner. In 2023, she endorsed IIFL Finance in January, VLCC in July, and became the first Indian ambassador for Shiseido in October. In January 2024, she promoted Cellecor Gadgets Limited’s earbuds and smartwatches, and in March 2024, she represented Rasna, the soft drink concentrate. In 2025, she was named the brand ambassador for Karnataka Soaps and Detergents Limited in May, representing Mysore Sandal Soap for a two-year term, and she took on the role of brand ambassador for GFS Developments in October.

== In the media ==
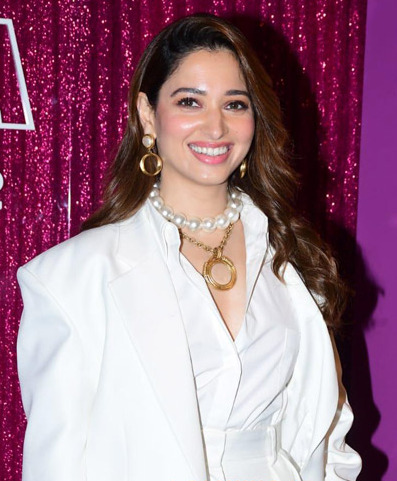
Bhatia in 2023

Tamannaah Bhatia ranks among the highest-grossing actresses in Indian cinema. In Rediff.com's "Top Telugu Actresses" list, she secured second place in 2011, first in 2012, and second in 2015. She was named the Chennai Times and Hyderabad Times Most Desirable Woman in 2012. In 2017, she placed fourth among the top stars of Indian cinema by IMDb. Bhatia was the seventh most tweeted-about South Indian actress in 2020, and in 2021, she stood eighth in the same category on Twitter, while also placing tenth among the most influential social media stars of South Indian cinema by Forbes India.

In 2023, she was the sixth most popular Indian star, according to IMDb. In 2024, she ranked sixteenth among IMDb's Top 100 most viewed Indian stars of the past decade. As of August 2024, she is one of the most-followed South Indian actors on Instagram. In August 2025, Bhatia was featured in KALKI Fashion’s bridal couture campaign.
