= Tadakha =

2013 film by Kishore Kumar Pardasani

- Movie poster
- Directed by: Kishore Kumar Pardasani
- Written by: N. Linguswamy
- Based on: Vettai by N. Linguswamy
- Produced by: Bellamkonda Ganesh
- Starring: Naga Chaitanya; Tamannaah Bhatia; Sunil; Andrea Jeremiah; Ashutosh Rana
- Cinematography: Arthur A. Wilson
- Edited by: Gautham Raju
- Music by: S. Thaman
- Production company: Sri Sai Ganesh Productions
- Release date: 10 May 2013
- Running time: 147 minutes
- Country: India
- Language: Telugu
- Box office: ₹21 crore distributors' share

Tadakha (transl. Mettle) is a 2013 Indian Telugu-language action comedy film directed by Kishore Kumar Pardasani. A remake of the 2012 Tamil film Vettai, the film stars Naga Chaitanya, Tamannaah Bhatia, Sunil and Andrea Jeremiah. Ashutosh Rana, Nagendra Babu and Vettai Muthukumar reprise their roles from the original film, while Brahmanandam and Vennela Kishore play supporting roles. The music is composed by S. Thaman.

The film was successful at the box office, collecting a distributor's share of ₹21 crore. It won a Filmfare Award South and two SIIMA Awards, with Sunil receiving Best Supporting Actor at both ceremonies. The film received positive reviews, with critics appreciating the performances of Chaitanya and Sunil.

== Plot ==
Sivarama Krishna and Karthik are brothers. Siva is a timid fellow, whereas Karthik is the tough guy. Siva's father used to worry about his elder son because he was very foolish and scared. After Siva's father died, Siva inherits the former's job and is transferred to Vizag, where Bagga and Kaasi are gangsters ruling the roost. When assigned to various cases, Siva seeks help from Karthik but does not reveal it to anyone. When a marriage proposal arrives for Siva, Karthik goes to see the bride and is surprised to find the same girl whose grandmother's veena he broke in front of their music shop. Upon meeting the bride's younger sister Pallavi, Karthik falls for her. However, he is hurt when Siva's wife Nandini reveals that her childhood friend is coming to India to see Pallavi. Karthik tricks him to send him back to America. Subsequently, a violent attack on Siva and Karthik occurs, leaving Siva seriously injured. However, the attack teaches him to fight back. In the end, the two brothers join forces to finish off Bagga together.

== Cast ==
- Naga Chaitanya as Karthik, Pallavi's husband
- Tamannaah Bhatia as Pallavi, Karthik’s wife
- Sunil as SI Sivarama Krishna, Nandini's husband
- Andrea Jeremiah as Nandini, Sivarama Krishna's wife
- Ashutosh Rana as Bagga
- Brahmanandam as Nandini's neighbour
- Vennela Kishore as Koti
- Jaya Prakash Reddy as the commissioner
- Raghu Babu as police officer Hanumantha Rao
- Rama Prabha as Nandini and Pallavi's grandmother
- Srinivasa Reddy as Reddy, Karthik's friend
- Vettai Muthukumar as Kaasi
- Murali as Sivarama Krishna's superior
- Rocket Raghava as the auto driver
- Nagendra Babu as Siva and Karthik's late father (cameo appearance; archival footage from Vettai)

== Music ==
Tadakha

Soundtrack album by S. Thaman
- Released: 24 April 2013
- Recorded: 2012–2013
- Genre: Feature film soundtrack
- Length: 18:52
- Language: Telugu
- Label: Aditya Music
- Producer: S. Thaman

S. Thaman chronology
Greeku Veerudu (2013)	Tadakha (2013)	Balupu (2013)
External audio
- Official Audio Jukebox on YouTube

Music for the film was composed by S. Thaman. The film's audio was launched on 24 April 2013 at Shilpakala Vedika in Hyderabad through Aditya Music label.

No.	Title	Lyrics	Artist(s)	Length
1.	"Gana Gana Bottu"	Ramajogayya Sastry	Haricharan, Priyadarshini	3:54
2.	"Mara O Mara"	Ramajogayya Sastry	Suchith Suresan, M. M. Manasi	3:04
3.	"Subhanallah"	Ramajogayya Sastry	Karthik, Priya Himesh	3:09
4.	"Viyyalavaaru"	Ramajogayya Sastry	Neeti Mohan, Sooraj Santhosh, M. M. Manasi	4:40
5.	"Nuvvu Nenu Bomma"	Bhaskarabhatla Ravi Kumar	Tippu, Ranjith	4:05
Total length:				18:52

== Release ==
The movie was released on 10 May 2013 after being given a U/A Certificate by The Censor Board.

== Reception ==
=== Box office ===
Tadakha was made with a budget of ₹150 million (US$1.6 million) and collected a share of ₹21 crore at the box office. Tamannaah Bhatia took a pay cheque of ₹15 million (US$160,000) for Tadakha and Chaitanya took satellite rights as remuneration. Andrea took ₹5 million (US$52,000) and Sunil took ₹25 million (US$260,000) as their remunerations.

=== Critical response ===
Tadakha received good reviews from critics, now running gave it the rating 3/5 Idle brain gave a review of rating 3.25/5 stating "Tadakha has all ingredients to satisfy masses." apherald.com gave a review of rating 3.5/5 stating "Don't Wait For Its DVD." 123telugu.com gave a review of rating 3.25/5 stating "Tadakha makes for a decent summer watch." Oneindia Entertainment gave a review stating "Tadakha is a good commercial entertainer and the director has nicely adopted Vettai in Telugu with few changes to suit the tastes of Telugu audience. It has some sentimental scenes to woo family audience. If you have not watched Vettai, don't miss this film." way2movies.com gave a review of rating 3/5 stating "Thadaka has all the right commercial elements including action, humor, romance, glamour with good technical values, also sticks to the Telugu audiences nativity factor. The film has all the needed elements to set the cash registers ringing at the Box-Office." Telugucinema.com gave a review of rating 3/5 stating "Tadakha is a decent mass entertainer. Time pass flick. Entertaining first half and glamour quotient are its strong points."

== Accolades ==
Filmfare Awards South

- Won - Filmfare Award for Best Supporting Actor – Telugu - Sunil

SIIMA Awards

- Won - SIIMA Award for Best Supporting Actor (Telugu) - Sunil
- Won - Best Actress (Critics) - Tamannaah Bhatia
- Nominated -SIIMA Award for Best Actress (Telugu) - Tamannaah Bhatia
- Nominated - Best Actress in a Supporting Role - Andrea Jeremiah
- Nominated - Best Actor in a Negative Role - Ashutosh Rana
