= Vijay Award for Best Film =

Award category

The Vijay Award for Best Film is given by the Star Vijay TV channel in India as part of its annual Vijay Awards ceremony for Tamil (Kollywood) films.

== The list ==
Here is a list of the films that have won the award.

Year	Film	Producer	Link
2017	Aruvi	S.R.Prabhu	
2014	Velaiilla Pattadhari	Dhanush	
2013	Thanga Meenkal	Gautham Menon	
2012	Vazhakku Enn 18/9	Thirrupathi Brothers	
2011	Engaeyum Eppothum	A.R.Murugadoss Productions and Fox Star Studio	
2010	Angadi Theru	Ayngaran International	
2009	Naadodigal	Michael Rayappan	
2008	Subramaniyapuram	M. Sasikumar	
2007	Paruthi Veeran	Gnanavel Raja	

== Nominations ==
- 2007 Paruthi Veeran - Gnanavel Raja
  - Chennai 600028 - Charan Sripathi
  - Mozhi - Prakash Raj
  - Pallikoodam - Viswas Sundar
  - Polladhavan - Kathiresan
- 2008 Subramaniyapuram - M. Sasikumar
  - Abhiyum Naanum - Prakash Raj
  - Anjathey - Nemichand & Hitesh Jhabak
  - Vaaranam Aayiram - V. Ravichandran
- 2009 Naadodigal - Michael Rayappan|Global Infotainment
  - Kanchivaram - Four Frames
  - Naan Kadavul - Vasan Visual Ventures
  - Pasanga - M. Sasikumar
  - Vennila Kabadi Kuzhu - Imagine Creations
- 2010 Angadi Theru - Ayngaran International
  - Mynaa - Shalom Studios
  - Thenmerku Paruvakaatru - Jotham Media Works
  - Nandalala - Ayngaran International
  - Madrasapattinam - AGS Entertainment
- 2011 Engaeyum Eppothum - A.R.Murugadoss Productions and Fox Star Studio
  - Aadukalam - Kathiresan
  - Aaranya Kaandam - Capital Film Works
  - Azhagarsamiyin Kuthirai - Escape Artists Motion Pictures
  - Vaagai Sooda Vaa - Village Theatres
- 2012 Vazhakku Enn 18/9 - Thirrupathi Brothers
- 2013 Thanga Meenkal - Gautham Vasudev Menon
  - Haridas - Dr V Ram Productions
  - Paradesi - Bala
  - Soodhu Kavvum - C. V. Kumar
  - Thalaimuraigal - M. Sasikumar
- 2014 Velaiyilla Pattathari - Dhanush
  - Goli Soda - Thirrupathi Brothers
  - Jigarthanda - Group Company
  - Kathai Thiraikathai Vasanam Iyakkam - Reves Creations
  - Madras - Studio Green

== See also ==
- Tamil cinema
- Cinema of India
