= Veeramani =

Veeramani may refer to:

- K. Veeramani (born 1933), President of the Dravidar Kazhagam, an Indian organisation centred in Tamil Nadu
- Veeramanidasan, South Indian Hindu devotional singer in Tamil, Telugu and Kannada languages
- Veeramani (film), a 1994 Tamil action film
- K. Veeramani (1936-1990), Devotional Singer
