= Train (2026 film) =

- Theatrical release poster
- Directed by: Mysskin
- Written by: Mysskin
- Produced by: Kalaipuli S. Thanu
- Starring: Vijay Sethupathi
- Cinematography: Fowzia Fathima
- Edited by: Sri Watson; Shaban
- Music by: Mysskin
- Production company: V. Creations
- Release date: 4 December 2026
- Country: India
- Language: Tamil

Train is an upcoming Indian Tamil-language action thriller film written and directed by Mysskin, who also composed the music. The film is produced by Kalaipuli S. Thanu under V. Creations. It stars Vijay Sethupathi in the lead role. The film was officially announced in November 2023. Principal photography commenced the following month and ended by October 2024. The film has cinematography by Fowzia Fathima. It is scheduled to release on 4 December 2026.

== Cast ==
Sorted per teaser:

- Vijay Sethupathi
- Nassar
- Shruti Haasan
- Yugi Sethu
- Narain
- K. S. Ravikumar
- Sampath Raj
- Kalaiyarasan
- Ira Dayanand
- Ajay Rathnam
- Vincent Asokan
- Babloo Prithiveeraj
- Thrigun
- Ganesh Venkatraman
- Preethy Karan
- Singampuli
- Suresh Chandra Menon
- Shaji Chen
- Selva
- GR Aathithyaa
- Rohan
- Kaniha
- Janany
- Diya Sharma
- Komagan

Additionally, Supergood Subramani has stated that he will appear.

== Production ==
In late March 2023, it was reported that Vijay Sethupathi would play the lead actor in Mysskin's forthcoming directorial. Sethupathi previously played a cameo role in Mysskin's yet-to-release Pisasu 2. In late May, Mysskin, during a promotional interview for Maaveeran (2023), revealed that there is discussion for a possible collaboration. He further revealed that the script work is in progress and the project will open when it commences. On 30 November, Kalaipuli S. Thanu of V. Creations made a public announcement of the project. The look of Sethupathi and the title of the film, Train, were revealed the same day. Fowzia Fathima was brought on-board to handle the cinematography, in her comeback to the industry after 21 years. A muhurat puja was held on 1 December in Chennai with the presences of the film's cast and crew. Principal photography commenced on the same day, and had ended by early October 2024. The film was edited by Sri Watson and Shaban.

== Music ==
Train

Soundtrack album by Mysskin
- Released: 12 July 2026
- Genre: Feature film soundtrack
- Language: Tamil
- Label: Saregama
- Producer: Mysskin

Mysskin chronology
Devil (2024)	Train (TBA)

Singles from Train
- 1. "Kannakuzhikaaraa" Released: 23 December 2025

The music and background score is composed by Mysskin himself, in his second film as a composer after Devil (2024). The first single titled "Kannakuzhikaaraa" was released on 23 December 2025. The audio launch took place on 12 July 2026, with the remaining three songs released on the same day. The lyrics for all songs were written by Kabilan.

Track listing
No.	Title	Singer(s)	Length
1.	"Kannakuzhikaaraa"	Shruti Haasan
2.	"Kuyil Paattu"	Sanjay Subrahmanyan, Charumathi Durairaj
3.	"Thirunangai Thalattu"	Mysskin
4.	"Ponathu Ponathu"	Vijay Prakash

== Release ==
Train was scheduled to release in August 2026; however, that did not happen. In early October 2026, Mysskin expressed sadness over the film's delay and was unsure if it would ever release. However, on 12 October, the film was announced to release on 4 December. It will be distributed by DMY in Malaysia, Home Screen Entertainment in Gulf countries, Singapore and Europe, Cine Galaxy in the United States, Ayngaran International in Sri Lanka, and Thirai Flicks in Australia.
