= Vidharth =

Indian actor

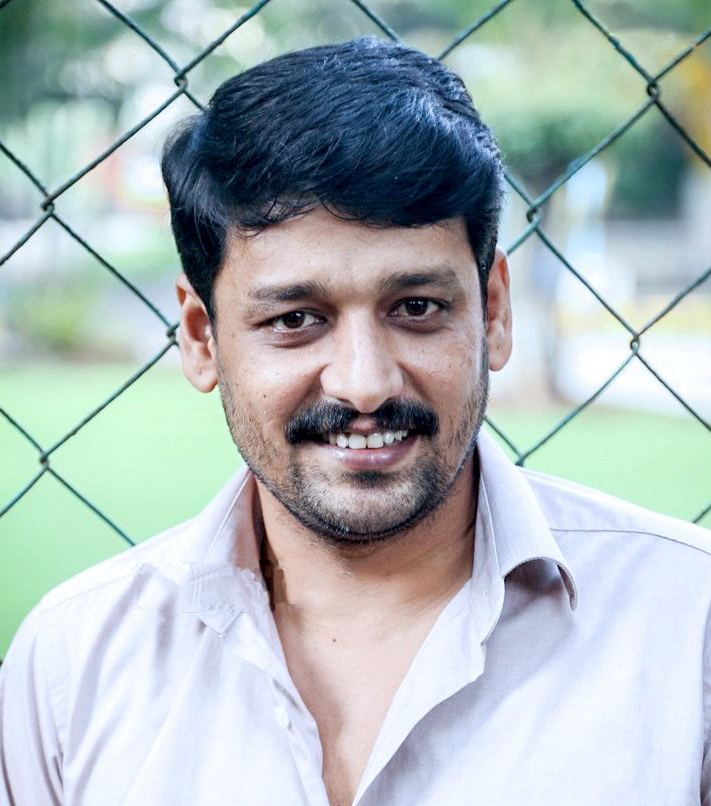
- Vidharth in 2014
- Born: Ramesh Venkatasubramanian
- Occupation: Actor
- Years active: 2001-present
- Spouse: Gayathri Devi (m. 2015)
- Children: 1

Vidharth (born Ramesh Venkatasubramanian) is an Indian actor appearing in Tamil films. He started his career in 2001 doing uncredited roles. His first major role was in Mynaa (2010), which became a huge success. He has also done a film for AVM Productions titled Mudhal Idam (2011).

== Career ==
Vidharth joined the drama troupe, Koothu-P-Pattarai through some of his friends and began learning the nuances of acting step by step and made his on screen debut with a small role in Gautham Vasudev Menon's Minnale (2001). Despite believing that the small role would bring him more offers, it did not, and Vidharth continued small-time work with his drama troupe. After ten years, Prabhu Solomon cast him in small roles in his films, Kokki (2006), Lee (2007) and Laadam (2009), after seeing him in action in Koothupattarai.

Vidharth collaborated with Prabhu Solomon again, who gave him the lead role in his romantic drama Mynaa (2010). The film became the biggest success of Vidharth's career. He starred in AVM Productions' 175th production Mudhal Idam (2011). In Kollaikaran (2012), he played the role of a criminal. He also played alongside Parthiban and Vimal in Jannal Oram (2013) directed by Karu Pazhaniappan. In 2014, he had five releases, the most in a year in his career. He first acted alongside Ajith Kumar in the masala film Veeram. Venmegam was his next release, which was said to be about the bond between an artist, played by Vidharth, and a school girl (played by Jayashree Sivadas). He then played a mini bus driver named Velpandiyan in S. P. Rajkumar's romantic comedy Pattaya Kelappanum Pandiya. His other releases that year were Aal, a remake of the Hindi film Aamir and reportedly the first Tamil film to be shot in Sikkim at the India-China border, and Kaadu, a film based on the subject of deforestation. With regard to Kaadu, The New Indian Express wrote that it had Vidharth's "most inspired performance post Myna".

In 2016, he had a psychological crime thriller starring Kuttrame Thandanai. After Mynaa, this is the career best of Vidharth as he perfectly emotes as the tunnel vision protagonist. In 2017, his films like Oru Kidayin Karunai Manu and Kurangu Bommai were successful. Subsequently, he played supporting roles in Magalir Mattum, Vizhithiru and Kodiveeran. He played the role of Jyothika's husband in Radha Mohan's Kaatrin Mozhi (2018). He has received a positive response from the audience. His next films were Vandi (2018) and Chithiram Pesuthadi 2 (2019).

In 2021, Vidharth and Remya Nambeesan played a pair in Vetri Duraisamy’s directorial debut Endraavathu Oru Naal. He then went on to act in supporting role alongside Hiphop Tamizha in Anbarivu (2022). He played the lead role in Carbon (2022), which marked the actor's 25th film. Followed by the comedy drama Payanigal Gavanikkavum (2022) which was released on the Aha Tamil OTT platform. It is the official Tamil remake of the highly acclaimed Malayalam film Vikruthi, which was released in 2019. The next one was the thriller Aattral, a failure. In 2023, Vidharth played in the successful romantic drama Irugapatru. Then, he followed with comedies – Kuiko and Aayiram Porkaasukal. In 2024, he appeared in three movies Devil, Anjaamai and Laandhar. Then, Vidharth plays the role of a farmer in Marutham (2025) delivering one of their most powerful performances.

== Personal life ==
Vidharth married Gayathri Devi in June 2015 and they have a daughter born in 2017.

== Filmography ==
Films

Year	Film	Role	Notes
2001	Minnale	Rajesh's classmate	Uncredited role
2002	Mounam Pesiyadhe	Drunkard	Uncredited role
2003	Student Number 1	Sathya's classmate	Uncredited role
2005	Sandakozhi	Balu and Kartik's friend	Uncredited role
2006	Kokki	Anbu	Uncredited role
2006	Thirupathi	Henchman	Uncredited role
2007	Lee	Goon	Uncredited role
2007	Parattai Engira Azhagu Sundaram	Azhagu Sundaram's friend	Uncredited role
2008	Kuruvi	Slave	Uncredited role
2008	Raman Thediya Seethai	Ramesh	
2008	Thiruvannamalai	Poovarasu	
2009	Laadam	Vembuli's henchman	
2010	Thottupaar	Maharaja	
2010	Mynaa	Suruli	Vijay Award for Best Debut Actor; Norway Tamil Film Festival Award for Best Actor
2011	Mudhal Idam	Mahesh	
2011	Gurusamy	Devotee	Special appearance in the song "Thengaayil Nei"
2012	Kollaikaran	Kuruvi	
2012	Mayilu	Murugan	
2013	Jannal Oram	Saamy	
2014	Veeram	Shanmugam	
2014	Venmegam	Aravind	
2014	Pattaya Kelappanum Pandiya	Velpandiyan	
2014	Aal	Aamir	
2014	Kaadu	Velu	
2016	Kuttrame Thandanai	Ravichandran	
2017	Mupparimanam	Himself	Guest appearance
2017	Oru Kidayin Karunai Manu	Ramamurthy	
2017	Kurangu Bommai	Kathiresan	
2017	Magalir Mattum	Police officer	Guest appearance
2017	Vizhithiru	Chandra Babu	
2017	Kodiveeran	Subash Chandrabose	
2018	Billa Pandi	Himself	Guest appearance
2018	Kaatrin Mozhi	Balakrishnan	
2018	Vandi	Krishna	
2019	Chithiram Pesuthadi 2	Thiru	
2021	Endraavathu Oru Naal	Thangamuthu	
2022	Anbarivu	Pasupathi	
2022	Carbon	Shankar	
2022	Payanigal Gavanikkavum	Ezhilan	
2022	Aattral	Arjun	
2023	Irugapatru	Rangesh	
2023	Kuiko	Thyagarajan	
2023	Kattil	Suresh	Cameo appearance
2023	Aayiram Porkaasukal	Thamizh	
2024	Devil	Alex	
2024	Anjaamai	Sarkar	
2024	Laandhar	ACP S. Aravinth	
2025	Marutham	Kanniappan	
2026	Moondram Kan	Shanmugam	

Television

- Malargal (2005) as Ramesh
- Kuttram Purindhavan: The Guilty One
