= Hare Kkaanch Ki Choodiyaan =

2005 Hindi-language television series

Hare Kkaanch Ki Choodiyaan (transl. Bangles of green glass) is a Hindi-language television series that aired on the Sahara One from series 25 July 2005 till 20 October 2006. The series was produced by Percept Picture Company, and starred Snigdha Akolkar in her television debut role, and Swapnil Joshi and Mihir Mishra.

== Synopsis ==
It tells a story of middle-class girl Shyamalee, and her gradual transformation into a woman of great strength. In her journey through life, Shyamalee faces many hurdles that she overcomes with tremendous grit and determination. She is often a victim of circumstances, but each time she faces the challenge and finally emerges a winner.

== Cast ==
- Snigdha Akolkar as Shyamalee
- Swapnil Joshi as Siddhant "Sunny" Joshi
- Mihir Mishra as Vikram Singhania: Mr. Singhsnia's son; Sharada's stepson; Ravi and Sania's elder stepbrother
- Dharmesh Vyas as Raghuveer Sharma
- Raj Singh Verma
- Shishir Sharma as Mr. Singhania
- Aditi Shirwaikar as Komal: Ravi's girlfriend, who wanted to be an actress, but later ended up being married to him
- Rajlakshmi Solanki as Rashmi Raghuveer Sharma: Shyamalee's elder sister; Raghuveer's wife
- Sonia Singh as Pooja Vikram Singhania: Vikram's ex–wife
- Gunjan Vijaya as Sania Singhania: Mr. Singhania and Sharada's daughter; Ravi's sister
- Raj Logani as Apoorv: Mohini's son
- Bhumika Seth as Sharada Singhania: Mr. Singhania's wife; Jayant's ex–wife and murderer; Vikram's stepmother; Ravi and Sania's mother (2005–2006)
- Akshay Singh
