= Kuttram Purindhavan: The Guilty One =

- Theatrical release poster
- Genre: Crime thriller
- Written by: Selvamani Muniyappan
- Directed by: Selvamani Muniyappan
- Starring: Pasupathy; Vidharth; Lakshmi Priyaa Chandramouli
- Music by: S. N. Prasad
- Country of origin: India
- Original language: Tamil
- No. of seasons: 1
- No. of episodes: 7

Production
- Producers: Avinaash Hariharan; Arabbhi Athreya; Senthil Veerasamy
- Cinematography: Farook J. Basha
- Editor: Kathiresh Alagesan

Original release
- Network: SonyLIV

Kuttram Purindhavan: The Guilty One is an Indian Tamil-language crime thriller web series directed by Selvamani. The series is produced by Avinaash Hariharan, Arabbhi Athreya, Senthil Veerasamy under banner Aquabulls and Happy Unicorn and is premiered on the streaming platform SonyLIV on 5 December 2025. The series stars Pasupathy, Vidharth, and Lakshmi Priyaa Chandramouli in lead roles.

== Premise ==
The story follows Bhaskar (Pasupathy), a former government pharmacist whose attempt to help goes wrong when a child goes missing, plunging him into a complex case fraught with guilt, secrets, and moral ambiguity. Gowtham (Vidharth) is the investigating officer, while Esther (Lakshmi Priyaa Chandramouli) is the frantic mother of the missing child.

== Cast ==
- Pasupathy as Bhaskar
- Vidharth as Gowtham
- Lizzie Antony as Anandhi Bhaskar
- Lakshmi Priyaa Chandramouli as Esther
- Munnar Ramesh as Inspector
- Rajapandi as Constable
- Ajit Koshy as "Pastor" Samuel
- Jayakumar as DSP
- C.Thavamani as flashback inspector

== Production ==
The project was officially announced by SonyLIV along with the first-look poster and cast details. The first trailer was released in October 2025.

== Episode ==
The first season of Kuttram Purindhavan: The Guilty One consists of seven episodes.

Episode No.	Title	Synopsis	Director	Duration
1	In search of the Lost	On the night of village temple celebration, a man is found dead outside his home and his daughter, Mercy, vanishes without a trace. Her grieving mother, Esther, is desperate to find her child. Baskaran, a government pharmacist, is desperately waiting for his retirement money - the only hope to save his grandson Rahul, who needs urgent surgery. Gautham, the powerless cop, but a reason draws him close to the case.	Selvamani Muniyappan	38 mins
2	What Happened last night?	Mercy faces an unthinkable ordeal and is brought to Baskaran for urgent help. He tried his best, but his efforts fail. Trapped by his desperate situation, Baskaran hides the truth. When he reveals it to his wife, she is shaken and unwilling, but with no other choice, she follows his decision. Together, they bury the truth for their own gain - Cops are tracking the suspect behind Mercy's disappearance.	Selvamani Muniyappan	34 mins
3	Living with the lie	Baskaran and his wife struggle to keep their secret buried, forced into lie after lie as every step risks exposure. Esther's search grows frantic, her dread of the worst pressing harder each day. Meanwhile, Gautham closes in, his suspicion fixed on Baskaran, and he is on the edge of finding the truth.	Selvamani Muniyappan	42 mins
4	Through the Darkness	Baskaran's desperation reaches its peak as his grandson's surgery becomes a matter of life and death. Driven by fear and love, he goes to unimaginable lengths, sinking deeper into darkness. Meanwhile, Gautham collects damning evidence, steadily piecing together Baskaran's hidden crimes.	Selvamani Muniyappan	38 mins
5	The Guilty Ones	Baskaran is consumed by guilt, haunted by the sins he committed against Esther and Mercy. Tormented, he even contemplates turning himself in. Esther struggles with her own guilt, blaming herself for her daughter's disappearance. When Baskaran meets Gautham, he finds a kindred spirit - Gautham's past guilt mirrors his own. Together, they reluctantly unite in a tense pursuit to uncover the real criminal.	Selvamani Muniyappan	37 mins
6	Breaking the Silence	The most unexpected secrets come to light, revealing hidden details of the night of the crime that no one knew. The true story of Mercy is finally uncovered, exposing shocking truths. Everything builds toward an imminent face-off between the real killer and Baskaran and Gautham.	Selvamani Muniyappan	33 mins
7	The Closure	The hunt for the killer begins amid the chaos of the temple festival. The final battle is set. Baskaran confronts the killer alone in a tense face-off, while Gautham races against time to catch him. The killer is caught, and both the killer and Baskaran are arrested. Esther is heartbroken when she learns the truth about Baskaran. In the end, the three are left to face the weight of their guilt in their own ways. The full truth comes to light.	Selvamani Muniyappan	39 mins

== Release ==
The series will premiere on 5 December 2025 on SonyLIV. It will be available in Tamil and dubbed versions Malayalam, Telugu, Kannada and Hindi as per its official listing.

== Reception ==
- Nandini Ramnath of scroll.in reviewed the series and wrote "A twisty and twisted saga of crime and punishment"
- Sanjay Ponnappa of India Today gave 3 out of 5 stars and reviewed the series as "A slow crime thriller series with a gripping climax"
- Narayani M of Cinema Express gave 3 out of 5 stars and reviewed the series as "Pasupathy and Lakshmi Priyaa carry a gripping, pensive and poignant mystery"
- Siby Jeyya of indiaherald.com gave 3.5 out of 5 stars and reviewed as "A Gripping Crime Drama Held Together By Pasupathy’s Towering Simplicity".
