= Kuiko =

- Theatrical release poster
- Directed by: T. Arul Chezhian
- Written by: T. Arul Chezhian
- Starring: Vidharth; Yogi Babu
- Cinematography: Rajesh Yadav
- Edited by: Ram Pandian
- Music by: Anthony Daasan; Kevin Miranda
- Production company: AST Films
- Release date: 24 November 2023
- Country: India
- Language: Tamil

Kuiko is a 2023 Indian Tamil-language satirical comedy film, written and directed by T. Arul Chezhian. Produced by AST Films, with the film stars Vidharth and Yogi Babu in the lead roles. The film was released theatrically on 24 November 2023.

== Cast ==
- Vidharth as Thangaraj
- Yogi Babu as Malaiyappan
- Sri Priyanka as Malaiyarasi
- G. R. Durga as Muthumaari
- Ilavarasu as Shanmugham
- Vettai Muthukumar as Panpazhagan
- Mosakutty Rajendran as Vettukilli
- Vinodhini Vaidyanathan as Pushpa
- Mookuthi Murugan as Murugan

== Production ==
The film was announced to the media by Lyca Productions in January 2023 as a part of the Netflix Pandigai online event. The film marked the debut of T. Arul Chezhian, a former Tamil journalist who had previously written the story and screenplay for Aandavan Kattalai (2016). The director initially titled the film as Kudiyiruntha Koil and shot the project throughout 2022, before shortening the title to Kuiko. During the production stage, the film underwent a change in producers with AST Films taking over from Lyca Productions.

== Soundtrack ==
The music was composed by Anthony Daasan with one song by Kevin Miranda. The song "Un Peru Maari" is based on the title song of Kuch Kuch Hota Hai (1998).

Kuiko

Soundtrack album by Anthony Daasan and Kevin Miranda
- Released: 2023
- Genre: Feature film soundtrack
- Length: 16:30
- Language: Tamil
- Label: Think Music

Anthony Daasan chronology
MGR Magan (2021)	Kuiko (2023)

Track listing
No.	Title	Lyrics	Music	Singer(s)	Length
1.	"Segapazhagi"	Kadal Vendhan	Anthony Daasan	Anthony Daasan	4:12
2.	"Adi Penne"	T. Arul Chezhian	Anthony Daasan	Mukesh	4:16
3.	"Kezhavi Kattum"	T. Arul Chezhian	Anthony Daasan	Anthony Daasan	4:19
4.	"Malai Murasu"	T. Arul Chezhian	Kevin Miranda	Kevin Miranda	3:43
Total length:					16:30

== Release and reception ==
The film had a theatrical release on 24 November 2023 across Tamil Nadu. A reviewer from Cinema Express wrote that "this rural drama attempts to be full of emotions, but lacks an anchor" In contrast, a reviewer from South First wrote that "Arul Chezhian's brilliant writing, outstanding performances by the actors, and organic humour make this film a must-watch", adding that the film was "a gem that needs to be celebrated". A reviewer from Dinamalar also gave the film a positive review, rating it at 3.5 out of 5.
