= Rakkasapuradhol =

2026 Indian Kannda film by Ravi Saranga

- Theatrical release poster
- Directed by: Ravi Saranga
- Written by: Ravi Saranga
- Produced by: K. Ravi Varma
- Starring: Raj B. Shetty; Swathishta; Archana Kottige
- Cinematography: William David
- Edited by: K. M. Prakash
- Music by: Arjun Janya
- Production company: KN Entertainments
- Distributed by: KVN Productions
- Release date: 6 February 2026
- Running time: 127 minutes
- Country: India
- Language: Kannada

Rakkasapuradhol is a 2026 Indian Kannada-language psychological crime thriller film written and directed by Ravi Saranga. It stars Raj B. Shetty, Swathishta and Archana Kottige.

The film was released on 6 February 2026.

== Plot ==
Set in 1999, the film follows Shiva, a police officer who is struggling with alcoholism and the death of his wife. After being suspended from duty, Shiva is eventually reinstated and transferred to the remote village of Rakkasapura, a place where crime is reportedly rare.

Soon after his arrival, a series of mysterious deaths and disturbing incidents occur in the village. The villagers believe that the deaths are connected to Kollidevva, a supernatural entity they fear. Shiva, however, approaches the incidents as a police investigation and begins looking for a human explanation behind the apparent supernatural occurrences.

As Shiva investigates, his own psychological struggles increasingly affect his perception of events. His investigation leads him to Siddayya, an elderly and respected temple priest in the village. Shiva eventually discovers evidence implicating Siddayya in the murders and moves to arrest him.

However, Siddayya is subsequently found dead under mysterious circumstances. The development causes Shiva to question the conclusions he had reached and whether the events surrounding Kollidevva have a supernatural explanation. As his investigation continues, the distinction between reality, his psychological condition and the village’s belief in the supernatural becomes increasingly blurred.

Shiva is ultimately forced to confront both the truth behind the deaths and his own troubled state of mind.

== Cast ==
- Raj B. Shetty as SI Shiva
- Swathishta as Roopa
- Archana Kottige as Parvathi
- Anirudh Bhat in a dual role as Aadhi and Aruna
- B. Suresha as Siddayya, the temple priest
- Gopalkrishna Deshpande as a teacher
- Arjun Janya special appearance in a song
- Gowrav Shetty
- Siddanna
- Jahangir
- Nisha
- Tarun

== Music ==
The background score and songs were composed by Arjun Janya.

Track listing
| No. | Title | Lyrics | Singer(s) | Length |
|---|---|---|---|---|
| 1. | "Neena Neena" | Manjunath BS | Vijay Prakash | 4:24 |
| 2. | "Siddayya Swamy Banni" | Kranthi Kumar | Prem | 3:51 |
| 3. | "Title Track" | Kranthi Kumar | Nishan Rai | 2:03 |
| 4. | "Amavase Raatri" | Bharath Lingesh | Kushala | 3:16 |
| 5. | "Villain Theme" | Devraj Sulok | Aniruddha Sastry | 1:08 |

== Release and reception ==
Rakkasapuradhol was released on 6 February 2026. It Started Digital Streaming from 11 September 2026 on Amazon Prime Video.

India Today's Sanjay Ponnappa rated it 4 .5 out of 5 quoting the film's writing. A Sharadhaa of The New Indian Express rated the film 3.5/5 and stated, "More than its mystery, Rakkasapuradhol remains effective because of its human core". Calling Raj B. Shetty's performance as the "film's backbone", Yemen S of The Times of India rated it 3 out of 5.

Vivek M. V. of The Hindu stated that, "Rakkasapuradhol is a thriller that punches above its weight. More importantly, it gets the job done after a shaky start". Sruthi Ganapathy Raman of The Hollywood Reporter India felt that the film is "uneven in parts". Nikhil Waiker of Deccan Herald rated it 2 out of 5 and criticised the film editing, background music and writing.
