= Raaghavan =

Indian actor

- Born: Raaghavan Murugan; 28 May 2007 (age 19)
- Occupation: Actor
- Years active: 2016–present

Raaghavan, also credited as Master Raghavan, is an Indian child actor who works in predominantly Tamil films apart from a few Telugu language films. His debut was in the 2016 movie, Sethupathi, with Vijay Sethupathi.

== Career ==
Raaghavan made his acting debut through the cop drama Sethupathi (2016) portraying the son of the character played by Vijay Sethupathi. The film won positive reviews, as did Raaghavan's performance, with a critic from Sify.com noting that the "two kids who played as Vijay Sethupathi’s children are too good". His next film, Rekka (2016), saw Raaghavan play the younger version of Vijay Sethupathi's character. He garnered attention for his acting in the video for the song "Kannamma" for the film.

Raaghavan continued to play pivotal roles as a child artist in Tamil films in the late 2010s, often portraying the child of the film's lead character such as in Bhaskar Oru Rascal (2018) and Maari 2 (2018); or the younger version of the lead actor such as in Hero (2019), Vaanam Kottattum (2020) and Enemy (2021). He also appeared in the Telugu film, Uppena (2021), as the younger version of the male protagonist.

In 2022, he appeared as the younger version of Vikram's character in Mahaan, and shot for his scenes in Kanchipuram. Raaghavan next was seen in Mani Ratnam's Ponniyin Selvan: I (2022) and Ponniyin Selvan: II (2023) portraying the Pandya prince.

== Filmography ==
=== Films ===
List of Raaghavan film credits
Year	Film	Role	Language	Notes
2016	Sethupathi	Maara Sethupathi	Tamil	
2016	Rekka	Young Shiva	Tamil	
2017	Pa. Pandi	Dhruv Raghavan	Tamil	
2017	7 Naatkal	Anush	Tamil	
2018	Bhaskar Oru Rascal	Aakash Bhaskar	Tamil	
2018	Maari 2	Kaali Maariyappan	Tamil	
2019	Hero	Young Sakthi	Tamil	
2020	Vaanam Kottattum	Young Selva	Tamil	
2021	Uppena	Young Aasi	Telugu	Special appearance in the song "Nee Kannu Neeli Samudram"
2021	Endraavathu Oru Naal	Murugan	Tamil	
2021	Enemy	Young Chozhan	Tamil	
2022	Mahaan	Young Gandhi	Tamil	
2022	The Warriorr	Police station tea boy	Telugu	
2022	The Warriorr	Police station tea boy	Tamil	
2022	Ponniyin Selvan: I	Amarabhujanga Pandian	Tamil	
2023	Ponniyin Selvan: II	Amarabhujanga Pandian	Tamil	
2023	Fight Club	Young Selva	Tamil	
2025	Rajabheema	Young Raja	Tamil	

Key
†	Denotes films that have not yet been released

=== As dubbing artist ===
Year	Title	Actor	Character	Notes	Ref.
2019	Pakkiri	Hearty Singh	Young Raja	Tamil dubbed version	
