= ITFA Best Villain Award =

== The list ==
Here is a list of the award winners and the films for which they won.

| Year | Actor | Film |
|---|---|---|
| 2008 | Prasanna | Anjathey |
| 2007 | | |
| 2006 | | |
| 2005 | | |
| 2004 | Jeevan | Kaaka Kaaka |
| 2003 | Kalabhavan Mani | Gemini |

== See also ==
- Tamil cinema
- Cinema of India
