= Mahesh Muthuswami =

Indian cinematographer

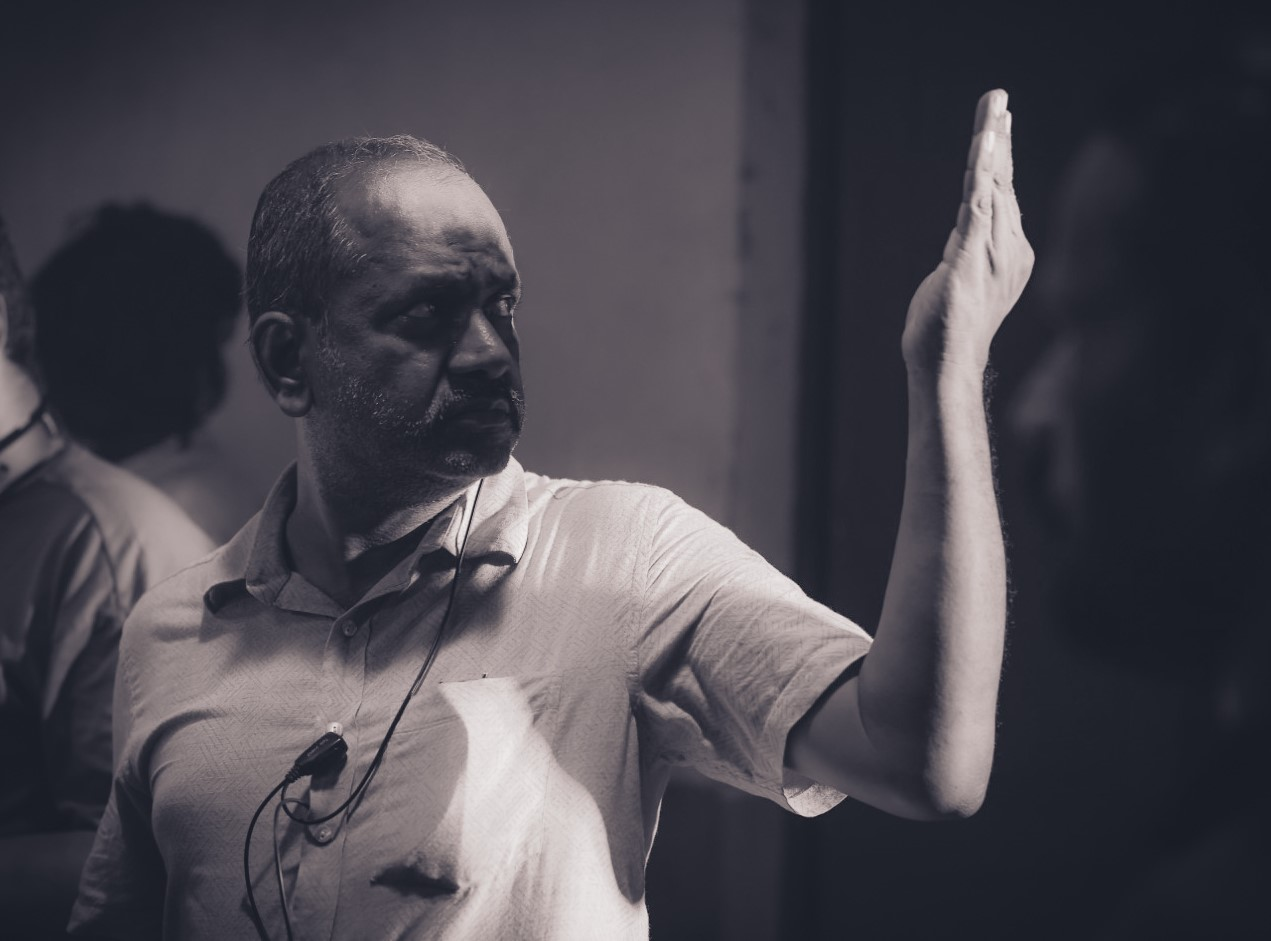
- Occupation: Cinematographer
- Years active: 2005-present
- Website: Official website (Archived)

Mahesh Muthuswami is an Indian cinematographer working in Tamil, Telugu and Hindi films.

== Career ==
Mahesh pursued cinematography at the Film and Television Institute of India (FTII). Early in his career, he assisted cinematographer P.C. Sreeram on the film Vaanam Vasappadum, which was the first motion picture shot digitally in HD.

== Filmography ==
Year	Film	Language	Notes -
2026	Habeebi	Tamil	
2026	Genie	Tamil	Under Post Production
2023	Thandatti	Tamil	
2022	Aadhaar	Tamil	
2021	Malaysia to Amnesia	Tamil	ZEE5 Original
2021	Anbirkiniyal	Tamil	
2019	Dharmaprabhu	Tamil	
2019	Kuppathu Raja	Tamil	
2019	Sathru	Tamil	
2018	Kaatrin Mozhi	Tamil	
2018	Oru Kuppai Kathai	Tamil	
2017	Bongu	Tamil	
2017	Enakku Vaaitha Adimaigal	Tamil	
2016	Thirunaal	Tamil	
2015	Uppu Karuvaadu	Tamil	
2015	Naalu Policeum Nalla Irundha Oorum	Tamil	
2013	Idharkuthane Aasaipattai Balakumara	Tamil	
2013	Kutti Puli	Tamil	
2013	Jabardasth	Telugu	
2011	Mouna Guru	Tamil	
2010	Nandalala	Tamil	
2010	Vamsam	Tamil	
2008	Anjaathey	Tamil	
2007	Risk	Hindi	
2006	Chithiram Pesuthadi	Tamil	
2005	Rightaa Thappaa	Tamil	
2002	Chaitra - Short Film	Marathi	
