= Endraavathu Oru Naal =

2021 Indian film

- Film poster
- Directed by: Vetri Duraisamy
- Starring: Vidharth; Remya Nambeesan
- Cinematography: Shanmugha Sundaram
- Edited by: Kasi Viswanathan
- Music by: N. R. Raghunanthan
- Production company: The Theatre People
- Distributed by: ZEE5
- Release date: 8 October 2021
- Country: India
- Language: Tamil

Endraavathu Oru Naal (transl. One fine day) is a 2021 Tamil language drama film directed by Vetri Duraisamy. The film stars Vidharth and Remya Nambeesan in the lead roles. Produced by The Theatre People, it was released on 8 October 2021.

== Plot ==
Rasathi (Remya Nambeesan) is a single parent leading her life with her son Murugan (Master Raghavan) in a village in Kongu region. She is financially burdened and earns a little with the help of her two bulls. However, a moneylender takes away the bulls and remains stubborn to return them only upon settlement of the debt. Rasathi takes up some small jobs under the MNERGA scheme to make her living.

A flashback is shown where Rasathi leads a happy life with her husband Thangamuthu (Vidharth), a struggling farmer. They raise a cow with much affection. Thangamuthu struggles due to a severe drought in the village, and his well dries up, leading to water scarcity. Meanwhile, Rasathi is conceived, and Thangamuthu takes care of her well. Due to the drought, Thangamuthu decides to further deepen his well by borrowing some money from a local moneylender, anticipating getting more water. The well deepening process goes on for a few days. Meanwhile. Thangamuthu’s cow delivers a couple of calves, and the family feels happy. However, Rasathi gets labor pains and is admitted to the hospital. Despite the heavy rain, Thangamuthu returns home to take care of the calves while he gets a call about the birth of a baby boy. Thangamuthu is joyful, but unfortunately, lightning strikes his well, where explosives are placed for the purpose of deepening it, leading to a major explosion leaving him dead.

The film comes to the present. Rasathi meets a job agent (Ilavarasu) in her village who needs some people to work in other states. As they want only males, Murugan decides to go along with the agent. Rasathi is hesitant as she wants Murugan to continue to go to school and not work at this age. However, Murugan convinces Rasathi as they are not left with any other option. Murugan joins the agent and lands up in a quarry in Madhya Pradesh for work in a tough environment. Occasionally, Murugan calls Rasathi with his friend’s mobile phone.

After a few months, the agent meets Rasathi and hands over some money, saying that it was given by Murugan. Rasathi complaints to the agent that she had not received any phone calls from Murugan for the last three months and could not contact him as well, as the number is always switched off. The agent rushes to the quarry and enquires with the in-charge, where he finds out that Murugan met with an accident in a conveyor belt and died a few weeks ago. The in-charge also bribes the agent asking him not to disclose this to Murugan’s family, for which he agrees.

Rasathi bails out her bulls from the moneylender with the help of the money sent by Murugan. The movie ends with Rasathi anticipating a phone call from Murugan, not knowing about his death.

== Cast ==
- Vidharth as Thangamuthu
- Remya Nambeesan as Rasathi
- Master Raghavan as Murugan
- Ilavarasu as Job Agent
- Kartthik Govind Raj (KGR) as Voice Actor( Only Voice)
- Diana Vishalini
- Rajesh Balachandiran
- R. Bhaskar
- Mahesh Shanmugasundram

== Production ==
The film marked the directorial debut of Vetri Duraisamy, the son of former Mayor of Chennai Saidai Duraisamy, and production began in late 2020. The film was shot in Vellakoil near Tiruppur. Prior to release, the film had a festival run, winning 43 awards across various film festivals.

== Soundtrack ==
Soundtrack was composed by NR Raghunanthan.

- Kanne En – Vijay Yesudas, Saindhavi
- Maattu Mani Satham – Namitha Babu

== Release ==
The film was to have a direct television premiere on Zee Tamil on 3 October 2021. but instead released on the ZEE5 streaming platform on 8 October. A critic from The Times of India gave the film a mixed review noting "despite its less than two-hour running time, the film feels too long, like a 45-minute short film stretched to feature length". A reviewer from Cinema Express, wrote "good intentions alone don’t make a film", adding "Remya and Raghavan deliver one of their better performances, but there is only so much that actors can do when the writing is shallow". The critic likened the story of the film to Samuthirakani's Vellai Yaanai (2021) and Raame Aandalum Raavane Aandalum (2021).
