= Kattumaram (film) =

Indian Tamil language drama film

- Directed by: Swarnavel Eswaran
- Written by: Swarnavel Eswaran
- Produced by: Swarnavel Eswaran
- Starring: Mysskin; Preeti Karan; Anusha Prabhu
- Cinematography: Karthik Muthukumar
- Edited by: Arun Kumar
- Music by: P. Bharani Dharan
- Release date: 2019
- Running time: 73 minutes
- Country: India
- Language: Tamil

Kattumaram (transl. Kattumaram; also known as Catamaran), is a 2019 Indian Tamil language drama film written, directed, and produced by Swarnavel Eswaran. Set in Tamil Nadu, it tells the story of a conservative uncle grappling with his niece's romantic relationship with another woman. The film stars Mysskin, Preeti Karan, and Anusha Prabhu.

Kattumaram premiered at the New York Indian Film Festival on 10 May 2019.

== Plot ==
Set in a coastal village in Tamil Nadu, Kattumaram follows Singaram, a traditional fisherman who becomes the guardian of his niece, Anandhi, a teacher at the local school, after the tragic loss of their family to a tsunami. As Singaram endeavors to find a suitable husband for Anandhi, he discovers her romantic same-sex relationship with Kavita, a photography instructor at the school. The revelation challenges Singaram's beliefs, leading him on a journey of understanding and acceptance.

== Cast ==
- Mysskin as Singaram
- Preeti Karan as Anandhi
- Anusha Prabhu as Kavita
- Selvam as Alankaram
- Giri Prasad as Iqbal

== Production ==
Mysskin accepted the film since director Swarnavel Eswaran was his friend. The film is one of the few Tamil films that deal with lesbianism.

== Release and reception ==
Kattumaram premiered at the 2019 New York Indian Film Festival. It was screened at the 2020 Bangalore Queer Film Festival.

The Frameline Film Festival described the film as "a heartfelt look at the strength of community in rural India, showcasing the importance of tradition along with the need for evolution" and "a beautiful and genuine experience". Racha Raj Kaur of Now Toronto wrote, "The dialogue is minimal, with expressive gestures and stunning cinematography of the jungles, seashore and ruined homes of Akkampetai imparting the story’s emotional weight. With an ending that’s heartbreaking but also perfect and realistic, this is the best film I’ve seen about inherent queerness in South Asia, ever".
