= Vandi (film) =

2018 Tamil-language film

- Promotional poster
- Directed by: Rajeesh Bala
- Written by: Rajeesh Bala
- Starring: Vidharth; Chandini Tamilarasan; John Vijay J.Navin Kumar
- Narrated by: Shiva
- Edited by: Rizaal Jainey
- Music by: Sooraj S. Kurup
- Production company: Rooby Films
- Release date: 23 November 2018
- Running time: 148 minutes
- Country: India
- Language: Tamil

Vandi (transl. Vehicle) is a 2018 Tamil-language action thriller film directed by Rajeesh Bala. The film stars Vidharth, Chandini Tamilarasan and John Vijay. Produced by Rooby Films, its music was composed by Sooraj Kurup. It was released worldwide on 23 November 2018. The film revolves around three friends who get into trouble over a missing motorcycle and a stolen motorcycle.

== Cast ==
- Vidharth as Krishna
- Chandini Tamilarasan as Swati
- John Vijay as Inspector Somasundaram
- Aruldoss
- Sriram Karthick
- M. R. Kishore Kumar
- Vijith
- Madhan Bob
- Swaminathan
- T. Ravi
- Supergood Subramani as Inspector Madhanamohan
- Uma as Servant
- J. Navin Kumar
- Arun Nishanth
- Chinnu Kuruvilla
- Kavya D
- Madhavi
- Vengal Rao

== Critical reception ==
The film received mostly poor reviews from critics. Times of India gave 2/5 stars quoting that the film suffers from sloppy writing. New Indian Express wrote "It requires great skill to write dialogue that feels at once both real and purposeful. Vandi’s dialogues, however, seem placed for no reason except to conspire to achieve its runtime of 150 minutes." giving it just 1.5/5.
