= Mudhal Idam =

2011 film

- Film poster
- Directed by: R. Kumaran
- Screenplay by: R. Kumaran
- Story by: R. Kumaran
- Produced by: M. Saravanan; M. S. Guhan
- Starring: Vidharth; Kavitha Nair
- Cinematography: P. Sellathurai
- Edited by: V. T. Vijayan
- Music by: D. Imman
- Production company: AVM Productions
- Release date: 19 August 2011
- Country: India
- Language: Tamil

Mudhal Idam (transl. First place) is a 2011 Indian Tamil-language romantic comedy film written and directed by newcomer R. Kumaran. The film is notably AVM Productions' 175th production. The film features Vidharth along with debutante Kavitha Nair, while Kishore, Kalairani, Ilavarasu, and Appukutty play supporting roles. The music was composed by D. Imman with cinematography by P. Sellathurai and editing by V. T. Vijayan. The film was released on 19 August 2011.

== Plot ==
Mahesh (Vidharth) is a thug in Thanjavur whose only ambition is to emerge as the number 1 rowdy with his name topping the list of wanted criminals in the local police station. He is called Yamakunji (transl. junior Lord of Death) by his friends, for he wants to send fear down the spines of his opponents. He indulges in all unlawful activities to achieve his mission. However, for his mother (Kalairani), he is the best son on earth. She earns her livelihood running an idly shop. Mahesh meets Mythili (Kavitha Nair), a school student and the daughter of a bus conductor Ponnusamy (Ilavarasu). Mythili falls for him; however, Ponnusamy opposes their affair. Things take a turn when Karuppu Balu (Kishore), the number one rowdy in the area, comes out of jail. Mahesh incurs the wrath of the aspiring MLA for no fault of his. Things take a turn when Mythili elopes from her house and Mahesh is forced to kill Balu. The movie ends with a strong message.

== Cast ==
- Vidharth as Maheswaran
- Mohana (Kavitha Nair) as Mythili
- Kishore as Karuppu Balu
- Kalairani as Mahesh's mother
- Ilavarasu as Ponnusamy
- Appukutty as Singadurai
- Manobala
- Mayilsamy
- Gadam Kishan as Dinesh
- Ponnambalam as Bhaskar
- Namo Narayana as Chairman
- Thirumurugan as Suresh Gopi
- Crane Manohar as Bus Conductor
- Rekha Suresh
- Keerthi Chawla

== Soundtrack ==
The soundtrack was composed by D. Imman.

Mudhal Idam

Soundtrack album by D. Imman
- Released: 2011
- Genre: Feature film soundtrack
- Language: Tamil

D. Imman chronology
Thambikottai (2011)	Mudhal Idam (2011)	Uchithanai Muharnthaal (2011)

No.	Title	Lyrics	Singer(s)	Length
1.	"Aiythaaney"	Yugabharathi	D. Imman, Chinmayi
2.	"Inge Vaanthey"	Arivumathi	Haricharan, Surmukhi Raman
3.	"Mudhal Idam"	Arivumathi	Feji, Ranaina Reddy, Sam P. Keerthan, Senthildass Velayutham, Vasudevan
4.	"Pappara Pappara"	Kabilan	Priya Subramaniam, Ananthu, Aalap Raju
5.	"Thindaduren Naane"	Arivuamthi	Vijay Yesudas
6.	"Uyya Uyya"	Arivumathi	"Dindukallu" Poovitha, Veeramanidasan

== Reception ==
Behindwoods gave the film 1/5 stars and wrote, "Mudhal Idam is a fair effort which is let down by a script which has its punches distributed unevenly. There are moments of fun and excitement, but they are interspersed by stretches of meandering scenes." Sify wrote "The plot is hackneyed and there is nothing new or gripping about rowdy elements wanting to become MLA. The film just does not qualify to be in the race for the first place as the title indicates."
