= Laandhar =

Indian drama film

- Theatrical release poster
- Directed by: Sajisaleem
- Written by: Sajisaleem
- Produced by: Shri Vishnu
- Starring: Vidharth; Swetha Dorothy
- Cinematography: Gnanasowndar
- Edited by: Bharath Vikraman
- Music by: M. S. Prraveen
- Production company: M Cinema Production
- Release date: 21 June 2024
- Language: Tamil

Laandhar (transl. Lantern) is a 2024 Indian Tamil-language drama film directed by Sajiseelam and starring Vidharth and Swetha Dorothy. The film was released to mixed reviews .

== Cast ==
- Vidharth as ACP S. Aravinth
- Swetha Dorothy as Jaanu
- Vibin as Nakul
- Sahana as Manju
- Pasupathi Raj
- Gajaraj

== Soundtrack ==
The music was composed by M. S. Prraveen.

Track listing
No.	Title	Lyrics	Singer(s)	Length
1.	"Ayalpirai"	Uma Devi, Deva	Shakthisree Gopalan	3:52
2.	"Udaiyathe"	Vishnu Edavan	Adithya RK	4:25
3.	"Kaalam Kodiyadhe"	Deva	Vedhamani, Arunraja Kamaraj, Srinisha, Mc Valluvar	4:03
4.	"Prabanjame"	Deva	M. S. Prraveen	3:33
Total length:				8:53

== Reception ==
A critic from The Times of India rated the film two out of five and wrote that "In the end, Laandhar is a predictable thriller that fails to break new ground but offers some entertainment with its straightforward approach". A critic from The New Indian Express rated the film two out of five and wrote that "Laandhar fails to leverage the strength of the premise, and the amateur writing debilitates the few positives". A critic from Times Now wrote that "This Laandhar, which refers to a lantern, isn’t shining bright. In all, it is a poorly crafted cop story that fails to make an impression".
