= Marutham (film) =

2025 Tamil film

- Theatrical release poster
- Directed by: V. Gajendran
- Written by: V. Gajendran
- Produced by: C. Venkatesan
- Starring: Vidharth; Rakshana
- Cinematography: Arul K. Somasundharam
- Edited by: Chandru B
- Music by: N. R. Raghunanthan
- Production company: Aruvar Private Limited
- Release date: 10 October 2025
- Country: India
- Language: Tamil

Marutham is a 2025 Indian Tamil-language thriller drama film written and directed by debutant V. Gajendran, starring Vidharth and Margazhi Thingal (2023) fame Rakshana in the lead roles. The film is produced by C. Venkatesan under his Aruvar Private Limited banner, while the technical team consists of cinematographer Arul K. Somasundharam, editor Chandru B and music composer N. R. Raghunanthan.

Marutham released in theatres on 10 October 2025.

== Cast ==
- Vidharth as Kanniappan
- Rakshana Induchoodan
- Lollu Sabha Maaran
- Aruldoss
- Saravana Subbiah
- Mathew Varghese
- Dhinamdhorum Nagaraj

== Production ==
The film is named Marutham, symbolizing the land of Marutham, that represents the cropland, one the five Sangam Landscapes in the Tamil language. Since, the film is set in the backdrop of Ranipet, the film was shot in places around Ranipet district.

== Music ==
Marutham

Soundtrack album by N. R. Raghunanthan
- Released: 26 September 2025
- Genre: Feature film soundtrack
- Language: Tamil
- Label: Saregama
- Producer: N. R. Raghunanthan

N. R. Raghunanthan chronology
Kozhipannai Chelladurai (2024)	Marutham (2025)	Lockdown (2025)
External audio
- Marutham - Full Album on YouTube

The film has music composed by N. R. Raghunanthan. The pre-release audio-launch cum trailer release event took place in Chennai on 27 September 2025.

All lyrics are written by Neethi.

Track listing
No.	Title	Singer(s)	Length
1.	"Nellu Vilayira"	Jithin Raj
2.	"Unnala Thaane"	Anand Aravindakshan
3.	"Nenjamo Thavikkithe"	Lijesh Kumar T K
4.	"Kannile Eeram"	Sai Vignesh

== Release and reception ==
Marutham released in theatres on 10 October 2025. Dinamalar gave 3/5 stars, praising the new scenes as its biggest strength, and praising the performances of the lead cast, screenplay, music and cinematography. Abhinav Subramanian of The Times of India gave 2.5/5 stars and wrote "The film is sharpest on nuts-and-bolts: forged papers sliding through, how branch-level impunity thrives on the ignorant, and how collective action shifts power. The courtroom track is refreshingly unfussy. However, the writing gets preachy about education, loses its fire, and repeats stuff we already understood." Dina Thanthi reviewed the film positively by praising the experienced acting of Vidharth and the performances of the supporting cast and praising the cinematography and background score, while criticising the screenplay, dialogues and the logic-violating scenes.
