= Aattral =

2022 Indian Tamil language film

- Poster
- Directed by: K. L. Kannan
- Starring: Vidharth; Shrita Rao; Vamsi Krishna
- Cinematography: Kolanji Kumar
- Edited by: Vijay Velukutty
- Music by: Ashwin Hemanth
- Release date: 14 October 2022
- Running time: 118 minutes
- Country: India
- Language: Tamil

Aattral (transl. Energy) is a 2022 Indian Tamil-language action thriller film directed by K. L. Kannan and starring Vidharth, Shrita Rao and Vamsi Krishna. It was released on 14 October 2022.

== Plot ==
Arjun is a mechanical engineer who wants to develop an automatic car. He needs Rs 10 lakh to start the work. Seeing Arjun in search of money, his father Charle, a mechanic, brings 10 lakh rupees. However, he is killed by some mysterious men who also steal the money.

== Cast ==
- Vidharth as Arjun
- Shrita Rao as Kavya
- Vamsi Krishna as Jo
- Charle as Arjun's father
- RJ Vigneshkanth as Saravana
- Vidyullekha Raman as Kavya's friend
- Vaiyapuri as Traffic Police

== Reception ==
The film was released on 14 October 2022 across Tamil Nadu. A critic from Maalai Malar gave the film a positive review, noting that "caution was necessary". A reviewer from Dinamalar gave the film a positive review, criticising the quality of the final product. A reviewer from Cinema Express noted "Vidharth’s latest outing is a far cry from its ambitions and gives the impression of being a pitch for a grander, smarter thriller".
