= Gunjan Vijaya =

Indian television actress (born 1985)

- Born: 31 October 1985 (age 40)
- Occupation(s): Actress, Model
- Height: 5 ft 6 in (168 cm)

Gunjan Vijaya is an Indian television actress. She made her television debut with Hare Kkaanch Ki Choodiyaan on Sahara One. When her role came to an end Gunjan moved on to Kyunki Saas Bhi Kabhi Bahu Thi of Balaji Telefilms where she played the role of Archita. She also appeared in TV fame kesar which is also under the banner of Balaji Telefilms. Gunjan also featured in the film 'Pyare Mohan' with actors Vivek Oberoi and Fardeen Khan."It was like a dream. Viveik and Fardeen are so down-to-earth. They treated me with respect," insists the actor. in 2014, Gunjan is being seen in Superhit TV series Beintehaa where she portrays the role of Nafisa.

== Television ==
- 2005 Hare Kkaanch Ki Choodiyaan as Saanya
- 2006 Karbon Kopy
- 2006-2008 kyunki saas bhi kabhi bahu thi
- 2012 hitler didi
- 2013 Beintehaa as Nafisa Fahad Abdullah
- 2014 Gangaa as Barkha

== Filmography ==
- 2006 Pyare Mohan

== Career ==
Gunjan is a Calcutta-based girl. Incidentally, she is a model and has participated in several fashion shows. She made her TV debut with ‘Hare Kkaanch Ki Choodiyaan’, (Sahara One) where she played the bratty Saanya, who knew how to get her way.
