= Bhaskar Oru Rascal =

2018 film by Siddique

Baaskar Oru Rascal
- Directed by: Siddique
- Written by: Siddique; Ramesh Khanna (dialogues)
- Based on: Bhaskar The Rascal by Siddique
- Produced by: M. Harshini
- Starring: Arvind Swamy; Amala Paul; Baby Nainika; Master Raghavan
- Cinematography: Vijay Ulaganath
- Edited by: KR Gowrishanker
- Music by: Amresh Ganesh
- Production company: Harshini Movies
- Release date: 17 May 2018
- Running time: 150 minutes
- Country: India
- Language: Tamil

Bhaskar Oru Rascal (transl. Bhaskar is a rascal) is a 2018 Indian Tamil-language action comedy film directed and co-written by Siddique. A remake of his own Malayalam film Bhaskar the Rascal (2015), the film stars Arvind Swamy, Amala Paul, Master Raghavan, and Baby Nainika, while Nikesha Patel, Aftab Shivdasani, Soori, Robo Shankar and Nassar play supporting roles. This marks Bollywood actor Aftab Shivdasani's Tamil cinema debut. Production began in February 2017.

== Plot ==
Bhaskar is a business tycoon and single parent. His father, M. A. M. Rangasamy, is a retired businessman, and Bhaskar takes over his textile and real estate businesses. Bhaskar deals with all the complicated situations in his profession with rowdyism and is crude and crass. This behaviour earns him the name "Rascal". He has a son named Aakash. Aakash and Shivani study in the same school. Shivani's mother, Anu, is also a single parent. She meets Bhaskar at the school, and they get involved in an altercation. Shivani admires Bhaskar for his authoritative stance and treats him like a father figure for his heroism.

One day, Bhaskar goes with Aakash for a felicitation ceremony, where actress Kalyani is the chief guest. A comedic incident meant that the reporters at the function mistake Bhaskar for Kalyani's love interest. Kalyani's love interest happens to see this news and separates from her. Bhaskar tries to set things right by meeting Kalyani's love interest and settling the misunderstanding, but the latter insults Bhaskar. This leads to Bhaskar thrashing the guy in his office; the press records it.

All these events place Bhaskar in the spotlight for the wrong reasons. Anu does not have a good impression of him but likes Aakash's mild-mannered nature. At school, Akaash's classmates mock him because of his father's recent fiasco. Shivani tries to help Aakash, which leads to her attacking the boy in self-defence. The boy's mother makes an issue of it, but thanks to Bhaskar's timely intervention, he sorts out the matter. Bhaskar encourages Shivani to be outspoken and aggressive, but Anu dislikes it. She argues with Bhaskar, takes Shivani home, and scolds her.

Anu tells Shivani the story of how she lost her husband Sanjay long ago in Kolkata because of her aggressive behaviour when a few thugs misbehaved towards her in the elevator. Sanjay does nothing, irritating Anu. Once he drops her off, he drives back to the place and beats up the thugs. Anu follows and sees this and tries to stop Sanjay, but one of the thugs shoots him and dies. She states she does not want the same fate for Shivani and her.

Meanwhile, Aakash and Shivani plan to get their parents married, so they spend time with their "new parents" - Shivani with Bhaskar and Aakash with Anu. Bhaskar shows interest in Anu, but she remains indifferent and tries to avoid him, even though she tries to understand his good nature.

On Shivani's birthday, a small party is organised. The only guests invited are Aakash and Bhaskar, but a third uninvited guest appears and introduces himself as Sanjay. Anu reveals she still has an untold part of what happened to Sanjay. He was sent to a nearby hospital, but the doctor plans to shift him to another hospital. Anu and her friend follow the ambulance but find that Sanjay is missing, and Anu discovers that Sanjay is a killer and sharpshooter. He had been using her to gain access to a party, had assassinated her friend's father, who is a scientist, and had stolen a research hard disk containing locations of plutonium mines locations in the country. Anu is shocked because Sanjay not only used her but also seduced her in bed, resulting in her getting pregnant. Anu had moved away from Calcutta, gave birth to Shivani, and lived there since then.

Anu accepts Rangasamy's marriage proposal to Bhaskar to save herself and Shivani from Sanjay but fears putting Bhaskar and Aakash in danger and backs out at the last minute. She decides to move to Canada with Shivani permanently. Sanjay's parents intervene and request Anu to go to Kolkata with them one last time to retrieve the hard disk in Anu's locker. Anu goes to Kolkata with Sanjay to get his hard disk with Bhaskar and the kids. Suddenly, Sanjay's father kidnaps Aakash and Shivani and demands the hard disk from Sanjay, indicating that he has a purpose for it. A fight ensues, resulting in Bhaskar saving everyone and killing Sanjay and his father. Anu and Shivani cancel their Canada trip and reunite with Bhaskar and Aakash. Bhaskar and Anu get married. A few months later, Anu becomes pregnant with Bhaskar.

== Cast ==
- Arvind Swamy as Bhaskar
- Amala Paul as Anu
- Baby Nainika as Shivani, Anu's daughter
- Master Raghavan as Aakash, Bhaskar's son
- Nikesha Patel as Kalyani
- Aftab Shivdasani as Sanjay, Anu's husband
- Soori as Rakkappa aka Rocky
- Nassar as M. A. M. Rangasamy, Bhaskar's father
- Siddique as Sanjay's father
- Jennifer Antony as Sanjay's mother
- Ramesh Khanna as Devadas
- Robo Shankar as Arnold
- Riyaz Khan as Riyas Ahmed IPS
- Narayan Lucky as Siddharth
- Chitra Lakshmanan as Registrar
- T. M. Karthik as Parthasarathy from Triplicane
- A. K. Sajan as Scientist Jaswant Malhotra
- Orma Bose as Jaswant's daughter

== Production ==
The success of Siddique's Malayalam film, Bhaskar the Rascal (2015) prompted the makers to consider making a Tamil version, with Ajith Kumar linked to the lead role in late 2015. After the plans failed to materialise, Siddique began discussions with actor Rajinikanth in early 2016 to play the lead role, but the actor eventually chose not to do the film. In September 2016, Siddique finalised Arvind Swamy as the male lead and held unsuccessful discussions with Nayanthara and then Sonakshi Sinha to star opposite him. In early 2017, Siddique selected Amala Paul and Nainika to play the other lead roles in the film. For the role a young male actor, the makers initially approached Aarav, the son of actor Jayam Ravi, and then Aahil, the son of actor Srikanth, to star in the film. The pair's refusal meant that Raghavan, who had previously appeared in Sethupathi (2016) and Pa. Pandi (2017), was added to the cast. Siddique revealed that he planned to keep the essence of the original Malayalam film, but would incorporate more action scenes for the Tamil version. Comedy actors including Soori, Ramesh Khanna and Robo Shankar were also drafted in to work on the project. This is movie is the director's fifth in Tamil after Friends (2001), Engal Anna (2004), Sadhu Miranda (2008). and Kaavalan (2011). The shoot of the film began in Kochi during early April 2017. Earlier the release was planned for October 2017, now the plan is to release in March 2018.

== Soundtrack ==
Soundtrack was composed by Amresh Ganesh and lyrics were written by Pa. Vijay, Karunakaran, Viveka, and Madhan Karky. Soundtrack received positive reviews with a critic calling it "decent work by Amresh".

Bhaskar Oru Rascal

Soundtrack album by Amresh Ganesh
- Released: 10 April 2018
- Recorded: 2018
- Genre: Feature film soundtrack
- Length: 18:22
- Label: Triple V Records
- Producer: Amresh Ganesh

Amresh Ganesh chronology
Motta Shiva Ketta Shiva (2017)	Bhaskar Oru Rascal (2018)	Charlie Chaplin 2 (2019)

Song title	Singer(s)	Time
"Amma I Love You"	Shreya Ghoshal, Sreya Jayadeep	4:46
"Bhaskar Is a Rascal"	Amresh Ganesh	3:58
"Thookanangoodu"	Krish, Vandana Srinivasan	4:08
"Ippodhu Yen"	Karthik, Andrea Jeremiah	4:20
"Bhaskar Theme"	Amresh Ganesh	1:10

== Release ==
The film was initially scheduled to be released on January 14 but later got postponed to April 27 however failed to meet the expectations. Despite May 11 being announced as the release date, it was finally released on May 18. The satellite rights of the film were sold to Zee Tamil. The film was also dubbed and released in Hindi as Mawali Raaj on YouTube on 27 December 2019.

== Critical reception ==
Indian Express wrote "The film's setting, story and characters fall flat, reducing Bhaskar Oru Rascal to a very few enjoyable moments that come far in between." The Hindu wrote "It's nice to see Arvind Swami loosen up on screen, but ‘Bhaskar Oru Rascal’ fails to create an emotional connect." Hindustan Times wrote "Barring moments where one can find relief in comedy, Siddique's Bhaskar Oru Rascal falls flat on its face and emerges as one of the most boring films in recent times." Sify called it "average entertainer" falls flat in "comedy and sentiments".
