= Mysskin =

Indian film director and screenwriter

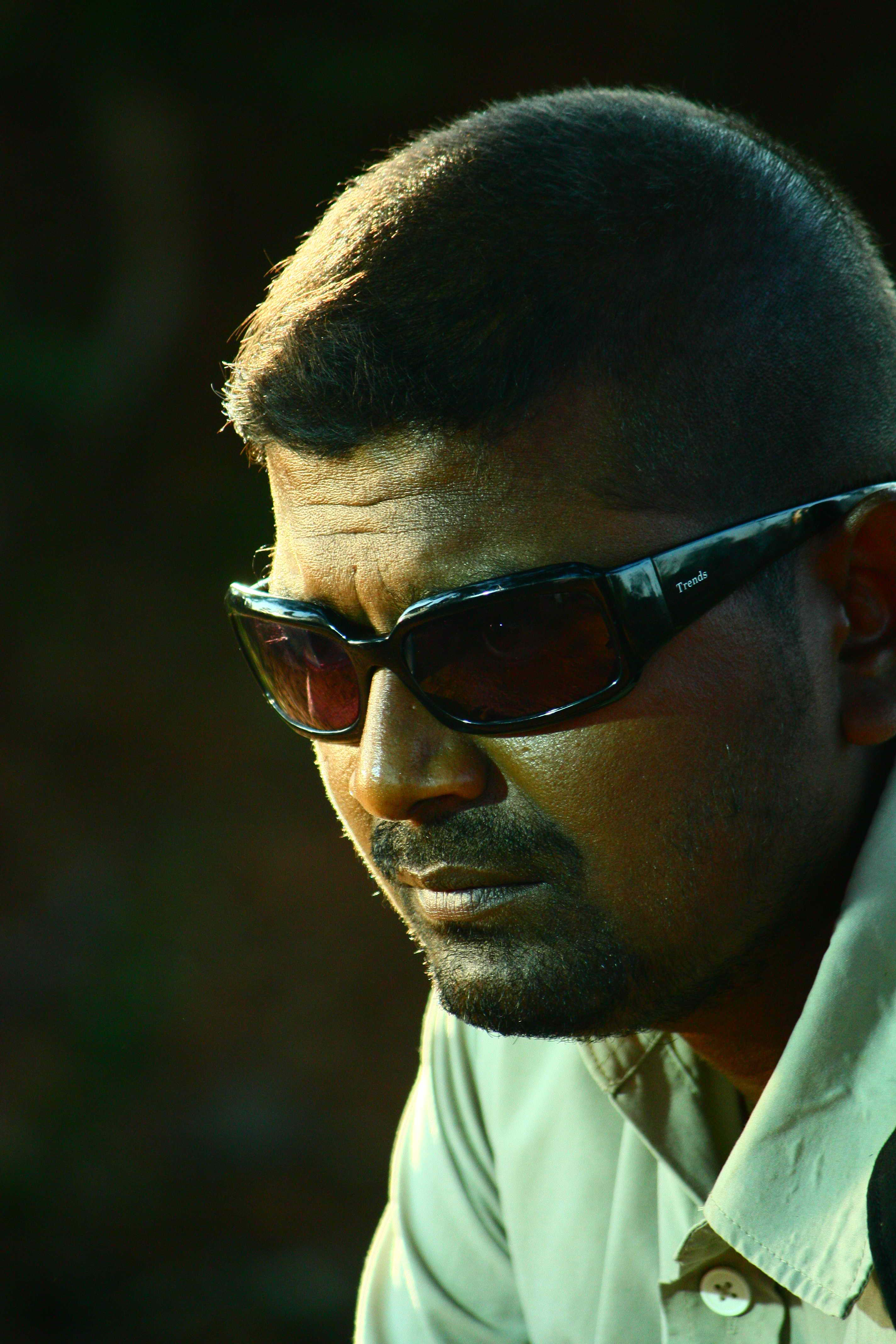
- Mysskin in 2011
- Born: Shanmugha Raja; 20 September 1971 (age 55); Madras, Tamil Nadu, India
- Occupations: Film director, Screenwriter, Lyricist, Playback singer, Actor, Film producer, Composer
- Years active: 2002–present
- Children: 1

Shanmugha Raja, known professionally as Mysskin (/ˈmɪʃkɪn/), is an Indian filmmaker, actor and musician. He made his directorial debut in 2006 with Chithiram Pesuthadi. His subsequent films Anjathe (2008), Nandalala (2010) and Onaayum Aattukkuttiyum (2013) and Pisaasu (2014) received critical acclaim. He made his acting debut with Nandalala, where he portrayed a mentally disabled man.

== Early life ==
Shanmugha Raja chose Mysskin as his assumed name, inspired by Prince Myshkin, the protagonist in Fyodor Dostoevsky's novel The Idiot. His schooling was in Tamil. He is an avid book reader.

== Career ==
Mysskin was working in a book store when director Kathir first asked him to join him. He was with him for nearly eight months but did not work in any movie. It was under director Vincent Selva that he did his first movie Youth, followed by Jithan, again under Vincent Selva.

Mysskin made his directorial debut in 2006 with the low-budget film Chithiram Pesuthadi, which went on to become one of the biggest hits of the year. A simple love story, it became a hit owing to the unique style the film was written in. The leads, debutants Narain and Bhavana, went on to become popular faces following the success. He then directed Anjathe (2008) which became one of the biggest blockbusters in Tamil cinema. The film received critical acclaim for all departments of filmmaking. The film was also noted for its narrative style and mise-en-scène, which marked an example of Tamil new wave cinema.

Mysskin went on to direct Nandalala (2010), a film loosely based on Takeshi Kitano's Kikujiro (1999) and being completely different from his first two ventures. The film is about a young boy and a mentally challenged person going in search of their respective mothers. Mysskin himself chose to play the mentally challenged character (marking his major acting debut) after the script was turned down by many established actors. The film went on to become his most critically acclaimed film, with some critics calling it one of the best Tamil films ever made.

His next film, Yuddham Sei (2011), a dark crime thriller was a hit at the box office as well. His visual style and directing prowess were appreciated and talked about by everybody. In 2012, the superhero film Mugamoodi has all the makings of a successful film but ends up disappointing. He then both produced and directed the film Onaayum Aattukkuttiyum (2013). Mysskin, known for his offbeat subjects tries his hand for the first time at a horror thriller genre. Pisaasu (2014) which has the signature style of Mysskin has been produced by director Bala's home banner B Studios. In 2017, Thupparivaalan is inspired by Arthur Conan Doyle's famous detective thriller Sherlock Holmes.

Mysskin has found success as an actor in films not directed by him. In the film Savarakathi (2018), he played the antagonist opposite director Ram. The film was an average commercial success but was praised by critics. He also had an important cameo appearance in Thiagarajan Kumararaja's Super Deluxe (2019). Later, he has directed the psychological thriller Psycho (2020). Mysskin's completed directorial films Train and Pisasu 2 are yet to release.

He has also played antagonistic roles in films such as Maaveeran (2023) and Leo (2023). He debuted as music director with Devil (2024).

== Filmmaking style ==
Mysskin is inspired by filmmakers such as Akira Kurosawa, Robert Bresson and Takeshi Kitano. He is known for his peculiar combat sequences using elaborate storyboard and real unarmed martial strikes and stances; unconventional shots (like close-ups of feet); diegetic sound, light, silhouette and shadow; stage techniques (like monologue, face-floor, motion-freeze); staccato background score; meticulous scene and set construction; irony-laden dialogues; ellipses; minimalism; deep characterization (with archetypal hairdo, dress, accent, posture, gesture, locale, furniture); limited use of song choreography; and neo-noir renditions where the lead role is not infallible.

Mysskin is known to start film shoot only after a bound script is ready. He rigorously annotates his scripts with cues and camera lens focal lengths for each scene. He says that his films are influenced by the works of Kurosawa.

His assistant directors like G. R. Adithya and Sri Ganesh have also made successful films like Savarakathi and 8 Thottakkal.

== Personal life ==
Mysskin has a daughter. His younger brother Aathityaa is a film director.

== Filmography ==
- All films are in Tamil, unless otherwise noted.

†	Denotes films that have not yet been released

=== As director ===
List of Mysskin film directing credits
Year	Film	Notes
2006	Chithiram Pesuthadi	
2008	Anjathe	Nominated, Filmfare Award for Best Director – Tamil; Nominated, Vijay Award for Best Director
2010	Nandalala	Also lead role
2011	Yuddham Sei	
2012	Mugamoodi	
2013	Onaayum Aattukkuttiyum	
2014	Pisaasu	
2017	Thupparivaalan	
2020	Psycho	
2026	Train †	Releasing on 4th December
TBA	Pisasu 2 †	Delayed

=== As actor ===
List of Mysskin film acting credits
Year	Film	Role	Notes
2002	Youth		Uncredited appearance in the song "Old Model Laila"
2002	Kadhal Virus	Man at film shoot	Uncredited roles
2005	Jithan	Man at phone booth	Uncredited roles
2010	Nandalala	Bhaskar Mani	Lead role
2013	Onaayum Aattukkuttiyum	Wolf / Edward	
2018	Savarakkaththi	Mangeswaran	Also producer
2019	Super Deluxe	Arputham	
2019	Kattumaram	Singaram	
2019	Suttu Pidikka Utharavu	Ibrahim	
2021	Bachelor	Pastor Doctor	Cameo appearance
2023	Maaveeran	M. N. Jeyakodi	
2023	Are You Ok Baby?	Child Welfare Committee Director	
2023	Leo	Shanmugam	
2024	Devil	Himself	Cameo appearance
2025	Vanangaan	Judge Kuberan	
2025	Dragon	S. Mayilvahanan	
2025	Oho Enthan Baby	Himself	
2026	Love Insurance Kompany	Doctor	Cameo appearance
2026	Parimala and Co	Inspector Emperuman	
2026	I'm Game	David Abraham	Malayalam film debut
2026	Sathyavan Savithri	Savithri's Senior Advocate	

=== As writer and producer ===
This is a list of films Mysskin worked for other directors.

Year	Title	Credited as		Notes
Year	Title	Writer	Producer	Notes
2018	Savarakkaththi	Yes	Yes	
2019	Super Deluxe	Yes		
2024	Devil		Presenter	Also music director

=== As singer and lyricist ===
Year	Film	Credited as		Song	Composer	Notes
Year	Film	Singer	Lyricist	Song	Composer	Notes
2006	Chithiram Pesuthadi	No	Yes	"Aaahayam Aaahayam", "Idhu Enna Pudhu Kanavo (M)"	Sundar C Babu	
2008	Anjathe	Yes	No	"Kannadhasan Karaikudi", "Acham Thavir"	Sundar C Babu	
2008	Dindigul Sarathy	Yes	No	"Sutta Pazhama"	Dhina	
2011	Yuddham Sei	Yes	No	"Aararo" & "Vedham Pudhumai"	K	
2012	Mugamoodi	Yes	Yes	"Bar Anthem"	K	
2013	Thulli Vilayadu	Yes	No	"Ammadi Aathadi"	Srikanth Deva	
2015	Kallappadam	Yes	No	"Vellakaara Rani"	K	
2016	Savarakkaththi	Yes	No	"Kathi Edukkuthaan"	Arrol Corelli	
2016	Savarakkaththi	No	Yes	"Thangakathi"	Arrol Corelli	
2017	Thupparivaalan	Yes	Yes	"Ivan Thupparivaalan"	Arrol Corelli	
2017	Detective (D)	Yes	No	"Title Track"	Arrol Corelli	Telugu dubbed version
2020	Psycho	No	Yes	"Thaai Madiyil"	Ilaiyaraaja	
2024	Devil	No	Yes	all songs	himself	
2025	Love Marriage	Yes	No	"Eduda Bottle"	Sean Roldan	
2026	Love Oh Love	Yes	No	"Vaadi Chellakutty"	FoxN	
