= Snigdha Akolkar =

Indian television actress and model

- Born: Snigdha Akolkar; Pune, Maharashtra, India
- Occupations: Actress; Model
- Years active: 2005–present
- Spouse: Sreeram Ramanathan (m. 2019)

Snigdha Akolkar is an actress who works in the Indian film industry. (Best Known for her performance as Maharani Kaushalya in Mythology series Siya ke ram.) She appears in Hindi series and Tamil films. Having first gained prominence in 2005 for playing the heroine in the soap opera series Harre kaanch kii choodiyaan (2005–06), she has since appeared in several other television, film roles and Brand commercials.

== Career ==
She appeared in Hindi television serials and more than 70 commercials, for Wildstone deodorant, Parachute, Lifebouy hand wash ad Westside.

She gathered fame by playing a Protagonist in daily soap Hare Kkaanch Ki Choodiyaan and other Tamil films. She is noted for her cameo song in Anjathe. She acted in Rajshri Production's Hindi film Love U...Mr. Kalakaar!. She appears in Vikram Bhatt's web series Zakhmi.

== Filmography ==
=== Film ===
Year	Film	Role	Language	Notes
2008	Anjathe	Dancer	Tamil	Cameo appearance in the song "Kaththazha Kannaala"
2009	Rajadhi Raja	Nikitha	Tamil	Lead role
2010	Nandalala	Anjali	Tamil	Nominated, Vijay Award for Best Supporting Actress
2011	Love U...Mr. Kalakaar!	Charu	Hindi	
2015	Ketugadu		Telugu	

=== Television ===
- 2005 – Hare Kkaanch Ki Choodiyaan as Shyamlee
- 2006 – Vaidehi as Janki
- 2014–2015 – Bandhan as Kajri Dev Patil
- 2015–2016 – Siya Ke Ram as Kausalya
- 2017–2018 – Karmaphal Daata Shani as Anjani
