= Anjathe =

2008 film directed by Mysskin

- Theatrical release poster
- Directed by: Mysskin
- Written by: Mysskin
- Produced by: V. Hitesh Jhabak
- Starring: Narain; Prasanna; Ajmal Ameer; Vijayalakshmi
- Cinematography: Mahesh Muthuswami
- Edited by: Sadagoppan Ramesh
- Music by: Sundar C. Babu
- Production company: Nemichand Jhabak
- Release date: 15 February 2008
- Running time: 207 minutes
- Country: India
- Language: Tamil
- Budget: ₹4.5 crore

Anjathe (/əndʒɑːðeɪ/ transl. Do Not Fear) is a 2008 Indian Tamil-language action thriller film written and directed by Mysskin and produced by Nemichand Jhabak. The film stars Narain, Prasanna, Ajmal Ameer, and Vijayalakshmi. The music was composed by Sundar C. Babu with cinematography by Mahesh Muthuswami and editing by Sadagoppan Ramesh.

Anjathe was released on 15 February 2008 and became a box office success. It is recognized as an example of Tamil new wave cinema from its composition of frames, selection of shots, and counter meaning in narration. The film was remade in Kannada as Anjadiru (2009).

== Plot ==
Sathyavan and Kripakaran are close friends living opposite each other in the police quarters in Chennai. Sathya is a rowdy, wasting his time drinking merrily and getting involved in petty fights. Though he and Kripa pass college with a first-class degree, Sathya has no interest in joining the police force. Kripa studies hard to become a Sub-Inspector and challenges Sathya to do the same. One day, Sathya gets into a big fight, and his father bashes him, saying that Kripa is the son he would rather have. Feeling insulted, Sathya enrolls for the Sub-Inspector exam at the last minute. His cousin's husband is the PA to a minister, and Sathya seeks his help. Owing to his uncle's political connections, he passes the physical and written exams, the interview, and becomes an SI. However, Kripa does not make it through despite being straightforward; this immediately creates a rift between the two. Sathya goes to training, while Kripa's father suffers a heart attack. Months later, Sathya is posted to a nearby station and returns home. Kripa's father lies to Sathya saying he has gone to Mumbai, but Sathya finds him in the local bar, having become a drunkard.

Parallel is the story of Deena Dayalan and Loganathan, who extort money from businessmen through kidnappings. Before Sathya becomes a policeman, he beats up Daya for attempting to molest Kripa's sister Uthra, though nobody, including Kripa, knows of this.

Sathya gains fame by holding off knife-wielding men who come to kill an injured man at a hospital, though the man is killed later in the night. As a result, Sathya is drafted into a special task force to catch the gang members related to the crime. Meanwhile, Daya and Logu carry out two kidnappings, rape the victims on both occasions, and release them for ransom money. The police beat up Kripa for a skirmish at the local bar; his father suffers a heart attack after getting his son back from the police station. At this point, Kripa is employed by Daya, mainly because the former is distraught and will fall easily to the lure of money and booze. The third time, however, the police are informed, but the kidnappers find out by chance and change the drop-off point at the last moment. They give the police the slip but narrowly avoid capture, with Kripa sheltering them in his house. Kripa joins to get money for his father's angioplasty, though he does not realise until it is too late that he is doing illegal things and harming young children.

Meanwhile, Sathya identifies Daya from the characteristics, with a background check revealing that Daya was accused of raping his senior's daughter in the army. Daya, Logu, and their accomplices are again almost caught when the police trace one of the accomplices' families. Daya kills his own man during this raid to avoid information being passed and hatches a plan to escape to Bihar in a poultry van. He then kills Logu upon learning that the latter had hatched a plan to kill him. However, to escape to the city outskirts to rendezvous with the van, they hijack the Inspector General's car with his two daughters inside. Switching soon to a disguised dog van to get past checkposts with the two girls, Daya, Kripa, and another accomplice arrive at a sugarcane field. Sathya recognises Kripa's voice from the ransom call he makes to the IG and follows Uthra from the hospital, who has been instructed to bring a bag full of cash from their home (kept there by Daya), to the sugarcane field.

The plot to kidnap the IG's daughters is an elaborate ruse to divert the police force to the south of the city while they escape from the north. The special task force, who are in the south of the city, realise the plot and, upon learning that Sathya is alone in the north, head in that direction. In the sugarcane fields, Kripa shows compassion towards the two girls, treating them softly. Upon hearing a noise in the field, Daya splits the group to meet with Uthra, who has the money. He tries to rape her, but Sathya intervenes. A fist fight ensues, but the special task force arrives and kills Daya by setting it up as an encounter.

The two girls split and escape from the third accomplice, only for one of them to be recaptured by him, but he lets her go because it is too tiring to carry. Kripa and the third accomplice try to run away, with Uthra behind them. Just as he leaves her to escape, she reveals that she is in love with Sathya and uses the situation to handcuff herself to Kripa to prevent him from escaping. In the end, Sathya shoots Kripa in self-defense and to save one of the IG's daughters from being shot. When Kripa lies on Sathya's lap, Kripa finds a ring he once gave Sathya on his birthday. Kripa thought Sathya threw away the ring while the latter was drunkenly partying at the bar. The ring, in turn, wets Kripa's eye and dies. The ending scenes show Sathya and Uthra getting married and having a son, whom they name Kripa.

== Cast ==
- Narain as SI Sathyavan (Sathya)
- Prasanna as Deena Dayalan (Daya) / Thulasingam
- Ajmal Ameer as Kripakaran (Kripa)
- Vijayalakshmi as Uthra, Kripa's sister
- Pandiarajan as Loganathan (Logu)
- Livingston as Masilamani, Uthra's and Kripa's father
- Ponvannan as Assistant Commissioner Keerthi Vaasan (Dubbed by Mysskin)
- Sridhar as Sappai, Daya's right hand
- M. S. Bhaskar as Loganathan, Sathya's father
- Priyasri as Sathya's mother
- Naren as a kidnapped girl's father
- Bomb Ramesh as Kuruvi (Sathya's and Kripa's friend)
- Snigdha Akolkar as the yellow-sari-clad dancer with green blouse
- Jasper as an anti-kidnapping team member (Police Officer)

== Production ==
After Mysskin had completed and released his maiden venture Chithiram Pesuthadi in 2006, he wrote the script for Nandalala for eight months, which was supposed to be his next directorial. A. M. Rathnam was initially to produce the film, for which his son Ravi Krishna was to play the lead role. Despite completing a photo shoot with Ravi Krishna, the film was shelved, since Rathnam opted out after incurring heavy losses with his previous productions. Mysskin decided to postpone the project, since "nobody was interested", and instead wrote a new story and commenced a new project, Anjathe with ₹4.5 crore budget, which itself was a result of Mysskin's anger. Nandalala was initially meant to be Sneghidha's debut Tamil film, but with the film getting postponed, she made her first appearance in Anjathe that Mysskin decided to direct instead. Before the title Anjathe was finalised, it was titled Aruvathu Sinam (transl. Anger should be one that reduces), and Sathya Sodhanai (transl. Experiments with truth).

== Soundtrack ==
The music was composed by Sundar C. Babu.

Track listing
No.	Title	Lyrics	Singer(s)	Length
1.	"Atcham Thavir"	Bharathiyar	Mysskin	4:37
2.	"Love Theme 1"		Instrumental	2:16
3.	"Kaththazha Kannaala"	Kabilan	Naveen Madhav	4:37
4.	"Manasukkul Manasukkul"	Snehan	Shweta Mohan	4:47
5.	"Kannadasan Karaikudi"	Kabilan	Mysskin	4:07
6.	"Veenai Adi Nee Enakku"	Bharathiyar	Sundar C Babu	2:18
7.	"Good Vs Evil Theme"		Instrumental	1:56
8.	"Veenai Adi Nee Enakku"		Instrumental	2:12
9.	"Love Theme 2"		Instrumental	1:58
Total length:				28:48

== Reception ==
Nandhu Sundaram of Rediff.com gave the film 4 out of 5 and wrote, "This is the year's best Tamil movie so far and will remain among its best. This is also the work of an ambitious and stridently commercial director, who is at the peak of his game". Sify wrote, "The canvass is engaging and thrilling as [Mysskin] is able to bring out the moods, anxieties and sheer dread of the characters due to top of the line performances from his lead actors". Malathi Rangarajan of The Hindu wrote, "Though Mahesh Muthusami's penchant for darkness suits the mood, at times it's a strain. But his unique choice of angles helps Mysskin create the right impact", also appreciating the editing by Sadagopan Ramesh and art direction by Amaran. Karthik of Milliblog wrote, "While I did enjoy Mysskin's film making style – an impoverished version of Gautam Menon, if I could describe it – Anjaadhey is a drab for most parts and definitely lacks the stupendous impact of the film maker's debut". Kabilan of Kalki praised the acting, cinematography, music, screenplay and concluded saying after a long time, this is a good film that has emerged with a dense screenplay and accomplished cinematic craftsmanship.

== Accolades ==
Award	Category	Nominee	Outcome	Ref.
56th Filmfare Awards South	Best Film	Anjathe	Nominated	
56th Filmfare Awards South	Best Director	Mysskin	Nominated	
56th Filmfare Awards South	Best Actor	Narain	Nominated	
56th Filmfare Awards South	Best Supporting Actor	Ajmal Ameer	Won	
56th Filmfare Awards South	Best Supporting Actor	Prasanna	Nominated	
3rd Vijay Awards	Best Film	Anjathe	Nominated	
3rd Vijay Awards	Best Director	Mysskin	Nominated	
3rd Vijay Awards	Best Supporting Actor	V. R. Ramesh	Won	
3rd Vijay Awards	Best Debut Actor	Ajmal Ameer	Nominated	
3rd Vijay Awards	Best Cinematographer	Mahesh Muthuswami	Nominated	
3rd Vijay Awards	Best Editor	Sadagoppan Ramesh	Nominated	
3rd Vijay Awards	Best Screenplay	Mysskin	Nominated	
3rd Vijay Awards	Best Stunt Director	Action Prakash	Nominated	
International Tamil Film Awards	ITFA Best Villain Award	Prasanna	Won	

== Bibliography ==
- Dhananjayan, G. (2011). The Best of Tamil Cinema, 1931 to 2010: 1977–2010. Galatta Media. OCLC 733724281.
