= Devil (2024 film) =

2024 Indian thriller film

- Theatrical release poster
- Directed by: Aathityaa
- Written by: Aathityaa
- Produced by: S.Hari; Radhakrishnan co producer Gnanasekar.P
- Starring: Vidharth; Thrigun; Poorna
- Cinematography: Karthik Muthukumar
- Edited by: S. Elayaraja
- Music by: Mysskin
- Production companies: Maruti Films; H Pictures
- Release date: 2 February 2024
- Running time: 115 minutes
- Country: India
- Language: Tamil

Devil is a 2024 Indian Tamil-language thriller film written and directed by Aathityaa. The film stars Vidharth, Thrigun and Poorna in the lead roles. The film was produced by Radhakrishnan and Hari under the banners of Maruti Films and H Pictures. It was released on 2 February 2024.

== Plot ==
Hema and Roshan meet in an accident. Next, it delves into the story of Alex and Hema's marriage which takes place in the past. Their marriage meets a tragic fate due to Alex's affair with his colleague Sophia.

== Cast ==
- Vidharth as Alex
- Thrigun as Roshan
- Poorna as Hema
- Subhashree Rayaguru as Sophia
- Rama as Hema's mother
- Mysskin in a cameo appearance
- Shaji Chen in a cameo appearance

== Production ==
Devil is Aathithya's second directorial endeavour after Savarakathi (2018). The film was completely shot in Chennai within 45 working days. Aathityaa described it as a "French-styled thriller".

== Soundtrack ==
Music was composed by Aathityaa's brother, seasoned film director Mysskin making his debut as composer. He also wrote lyrics for all songs.

== Reception ==
Gopinath Rajendran of The Hindu stated that "Poorna is one of those rare performers who has not gotten the spotlight she deserves. She is fantastic in Devil, but the film does not offer her much, despite being centred around her. The film suffers from an identity crisis as it fails to pick a particular route and, in the end, gets reduced to a thriller that offers no thrills." Narayani M. of The New Indian Express rated the film two out of five stars and noted that "Director Aathityaa's Devil, even with its straightforward title, does not seem to know what it is about, as the film itself suffers from an identity crisis. Throughout the runtime, we are left wondering if it is either an emotional drama, a horror thriller, or both". Roopa Radhakrishnan of The Times of India rated 2 1/2 out of 5 and stated that "what works in Devil's favor is that the film has a wonderfully subtle Poorna at the center of it."
