= Ondu Sarala Prema Kathe =

Kannada movie directed by Simple Suni

- Theatrical release poster
- Directed by: Suni
- Written by: Suni
- Produced by: Mysore Ramesh
- Starring: Vinay Rajkumar; Mallika Singh; Swathishta; Rajesh Nataranga
- Cinematography: Karthik Sharma; Sabha Kumar
- Edited by: Aadhi
- Music by: Veer Samarth
- Production company: Ram Movies
- Distributed by: KRG Studios; Sandalwood Talkies (Overseas)
- Release date: 8 February 2024
- Country: India
- Language: Kannada

Ondu Sarala Prema Kathe (transl. A simple love story) is a 2024 Indian Kannada-language romantic comedy film written and directed by Simple Suni, produced by Mysore Ramesh under Ram Movies. The film features Vinay Rajkumar, Mallika Singh, Swatishta Krishnan and Rajesh Nataranga in the lead roles. The film's score and soundtrack are composed by Veer Samarth, while the cinematography is by Karthik Sharma and Sabha Kumar, with editing by Aadhi.

The film was released on 8 February 2024 and opened to positive reviews from critics.

== Plot ==
It is the story of a mystic who dreams of becoming a music director, his search for a voice that beats right to the melody of his mind. His other dream is to live with the one who will possess that voice.

== Cast ==
- Vinay Rajkumar as "Athi" Athishay
- Mallika Singh as Madhura
- Swathishta as Anuraga "Anu"
- Rajesh Nataranga as Athishay's father
- Aruna Balraj as Athishay's mother
- Sadhu Kokila as himself
- Karthik Mahesh as Ekanjith
- Amrutha Murthy as Athishay's grandmother (younger version)
- Raghavendra Rajkumar as music teacher (guest appearance)
- Shwetha Srivatsav as singer (guest appearance)

== Production ==
The project marks the first collaboration of Suni and Vinay. The project also marks the debut of Mallika Singh of RadaKrishn fame and Swatishta Krishnan of Vikram fame in Sandalwood. The film has been shot across various locations of Bengaluru, Mysuru, Rajasthan and Mumbai. The shooting was wrapped up on 7 November 2023.

== Soundtrack ==
Ondu Sarala Prema Kathe

Soundtrack album by Veer Samarth
- Released: 2024
- Recorded: 2024
- Genre: Feature film soundtrack
- Length: 44:12
- Label: Anand Audio
- Producer: Veer Samarth

Veer Samarth has composed the film's background and scored for its soundtrack. The album comprises a bit of various versions like ghazal, sufi, duet, melody, devotional, and rap.

Track listing
No.	Title	Lyrics	Artist(s)	Length
1.	"Ninyaarele"	Siddu Kodipura, Suni	Armaan Malik, Vihaan Santosh Dev, Chetan Naik	04:54
2.	"Gunu Gunugu"	Sachin Sanghe	Keshav Anand	06:08
3.	"Ella Maatannu"	Jayant Kaikini	Shivani Swami, Veer Samarth	4:18
4.	"Nenne Bekilla"	Nagaraju.B, Kadkol Madivaleshwara	Keshav Anand, Sriraksha Priyaram	3:34
5.	"Nanna Kanasanu"	Suni	Siddhartha Belmannu	3:27
6.	"Aamchi Mumbai"	Sai Sarvesh	Pancham Jeeva, Shruthi Rao, Rohit Hallikhede	3:16
7.	"Krishna Enabarade"	Sri Prundaradaasaru	Shivani Swami	2:56
8.	"Sangeetha Sulabhavalla"	Siddu Kodipura, Suni	Veer Samarth	3:15
9.	"Ninyaarele-Keshav"	Suni	Keshav Anand	4:55
10.	"Sukomale"	Suni	Keshav Anand	01:34
11.	"Percussion Theme"			2:15
12.	"Chende Theme"			3:40
Total length:				44:12

== Release ==
=== Theatrical ===
The film was released across Karnataka on 8 February 2024. The film was released overseas by Sandalwood Talkies few weeks after the local release.

=== Home media ===
The film's digital right was acquired by Amazon Prime Video and premiered on 19 March 2024, while the satellite rights was acquired by Star Suvarna.

== Reception ==
The film opened to positive reviews from critics and audience alike with praise for the performances of Vinay and Swatishta alongside the witty dialogues.

Harish Basavarajaiah of The Times of India rated the movie 3.5 out of 5 and wrote "OSPK is a rare love story that is simple yet complicated. The movie is sure to haunt filmgoers even after coming out of theatres. Word to the wise! Don’t miss the ‘climax of the climax’, which is indeed the twist in the tale that no one would have expected!". Prathiba joy of OTTPlay rated the movie 3.5/5 and described "Ondu Sarala Prema Kathe is the kind of film that you should approach with zero expectations – none whatsoever, not from the director or the cast. Remember, it’s a simple love story, nothing more, nothing less. Suni and team deliver on that promise". Swaroop Kodur of The News Minute in his review said the film is "A fun, light-hearted entertainer". Vivek of The Hindu in his review wrote "A sluggish return to form for Suni". Sharadhaa of Cinema Express rated the film 3/5 and wrote "Despite its occasional missteps, the film leaves a lasting impression, akin to a haunting melody that stays with you. It reminds us that love very much like life is a beautiful mix of highs and lows showcasing the resilience of the human heart."
