= Kaatrin Mozhi =

- Theatrical release poster
- Directed by: Radha Mohan
- Written by: Pon Parthiban (dialogues)
- Story by: Suresh Triveni
- Based on: Tumhari Sulu (Hindi) by Suresh Triveni
- Produced by: G. Dhananjayan
- Starring: Jyothika; Vidharth; Lakshmi Manchu
- Cinematography: Mahesh Muthuswami
- Edited by: Praveen K. L.
- Music by: A. H. Kaashif
- Production companies: BOFTA Media Works; Creative Entertainers
- Distributed by: Madhumathii Films
- Release date: 16 November 2018
- Running time: 140 minutes
- Country: India
- Language: Tamil

Kaatrin Mozhi (transl. The language of air) is a 2018 Indian Tamil-language comedy drama film directed by Radha Mohan, starring Jyothika, Vidharth and Lakshmi Manchu. A remake of the Hindi-language film Tumhari Sulu (2017), it narrates the story of an ambitious housewife who becomes a radio jockey for a late-night relationship advice show. The film was released in theatres on 16 November 2018. Its title was taken from a song from Mozhi (2007), also directed by Radha Mohan and starring Jyothika.

== Plot ==
Vijayalakshmi Balakrishnan, nicknamed Vijji, is a middle-class housewife living in Chromepet with her family. Vijji enjoys her life to the fullest with her husband Balakrishnan and an 11-year-old son, named Siddharth "Siddhu". She dreams of being a working woman, but since she could not complete her high school she cannot think of any white collar jobs. Her elder twin sisters are always critical of her educational credentials and frequently mock her failed business ideas. Vijji is fond of participating in and winning any and every contest around her, be it a singing competition, an athletic event or a simple lemon and spoon race. Her husband, Balu works as a manager in a tailoring firm, which is quite a frustrating job since everyone apart from him is over the age of sixty, including the owners. Most of them are either unresponsive or unreasonable. On top of it, the firm now is taken over by the grandson of the owner, who is very rude and treats him with disdain. Balu bears all this for his family. Siddhu is constantly teased by a set of students, who have expensive items like a PlayStation gaming console, etc., in school.

One fine day, Vijji wins a contest hosted by her favourite radio station. She receives a call from Anjali, the top RJ of the radio station. On the call, Anjali makes her sing. Vijji sings a retro song, which everyone at the radio station finds funny. Next day she goes to the Radio station to collect her prize. There she sees a poster of auditions for the position of a RJ. She is very excited and feels that this is the job she is waiting for. She insists on filling the form, which the receptionist refuses on some pretext or the other. Coincidentally, RJ Anjali walks in and feels that she must give her a shot.

She takes Vijji to meet her boss, Maria. Vijji is extrovert and engaging, which is a bit annoying for others but Maria finds her interesting. She gives her an opportunity to audition. At the audition, Vijji is very casual and not able to control her laughter after Kumki, one of the poets at the radio station, recites the lines in a sensual manner. Just at the end, she manages to say 'Hello' in a sensual manner, which impresses Maria. Maria gives her card and asks if she would be able to do a call-in night show – where people would call her to talk about their troubles. Maria gives Vijji time to think.

Vijji thinks about the job and the sensual accent in which she would have to answer the calls. Just to try out, she calls a nearby grocery store, talks in a sensual accent and requests the owner to get a broom and deliver it to the Fifth floor. The owner excitingly comes to the address, only to find out that the floor does not exist. Next, she calls her husband and drives him mad.

Next day, she calls Maria multiple times to tell that she is ready to take up the job. As it happens, Maria is in a very difficult situation and is not able to receive any of her calls. Vijji is disappointed and sends a few messages indicating that she is ready to work. Next day, Maria realises the passion behind Vijji's persistent annoyance and fires up her potential. To start with, Balu is annoyed with her that she took up the job without discussing with him but later relents out of his love for her.

The company provides Vijji pick-up and drop facility. On her first day, Vijji faces an annoying caller who tries to change their chat into an obscene one. With her sharp mind, Vijji is able to tactfully handle it. Next, she gets a request from a caller to sing an out of the world kind of a song for him. Vijji, out of excitement, sings a song which she sings only for her husband. Balu is annoyed by all this, as well as frustrated with his new boss who treats him rudely. Because of these two situations, he becomes angry and, at times, insecure.

Vijji's parents and her sisters are very angry with her program and force her to quit the job. But Balu stands by her and she is able to continue. Maria is very happy with her and the show becomes very successful. Vijji also enjoys her work. But at times, Balu expresses his frustration either at his job or hers. It seems that life is like a roller coaster ride for Vijji, high at work and low at home.

One day, she gets a call from Siddhu's school and they visit his principal's office. The principal reveals that Siddhu and his friend were about to sell some stolen phones, one of which was Balu's to buy a PlayStation gaming console, and also forged Balu's signatures over the remarks written in his school diary. On this basis, he suspends Siddhu from the school. This becomes a very big issue in their family and Vijji's sisters blame her that because of her job she has neglected Siddhu. They decide that she now has to leave the job and Siddhu would not stay with them because her low level of education is causing similar influence on him. Vijji takes a tough stand, rejects both the conditions and leaves for her job. While about to start the show, she gets a call that Siddhu is missing. They later find a note by him, revealing he is very ashamed of what he has done. He is very sad to see that his mother had to leave her job because of his actions. He requests his father to support his mother and her job.

Next day, police find him and bring him home. Vijji goes to her office and resigns. She feels that she is not able to handle the emotional turmoil at home. Just as she is leaving, she finds the receptionist having a fight with the tiffin service guy. Vijji has an idea and she requests Maria to give her the contract for the tiffin service.

The film is now showing events that is happening 1 month later. We see Balu managing the tiffin business and Vijji going back to her job; managing both the household and her professional life.

== Cast ==
- Jyothika as Vijayalakshmi Balakrishnan (Viji) / RJ Madhu
- Vidharth as Balakrishnan (Baalu), Viji's husband
- Lakshmi Manchu as Maria, Radio Station Manager
- Elango Kumaravel as Kumbakarai Krishnamurthy (Kumki)
- Sindhu Shyam as Receptionist Preethi
- Sandra Amy as RJ Anjali
- Vishalini as Mallika
- Narayan Lucky as Sandeep
- Mohan Ram as Viji's father
- Sindhu Shekharan as Viji's sister
- Seema Taneja as Viji's sister
- M. S. Bhaskar as Neelakandan (Neelu)
- Manobala as Moorthy
- Uma as Saroja Maamy
- Mayilsamy as Departmental Store Owner
- Jangiri Madhumitha as Gym worker
- Tejas Krishna as Siddhu
- Yogi Babu as Mahesh Babu, Caller of Radio Station (cameo appearance)
- Simbhu in a Special appearance as guest at Radio Station

== Production ==
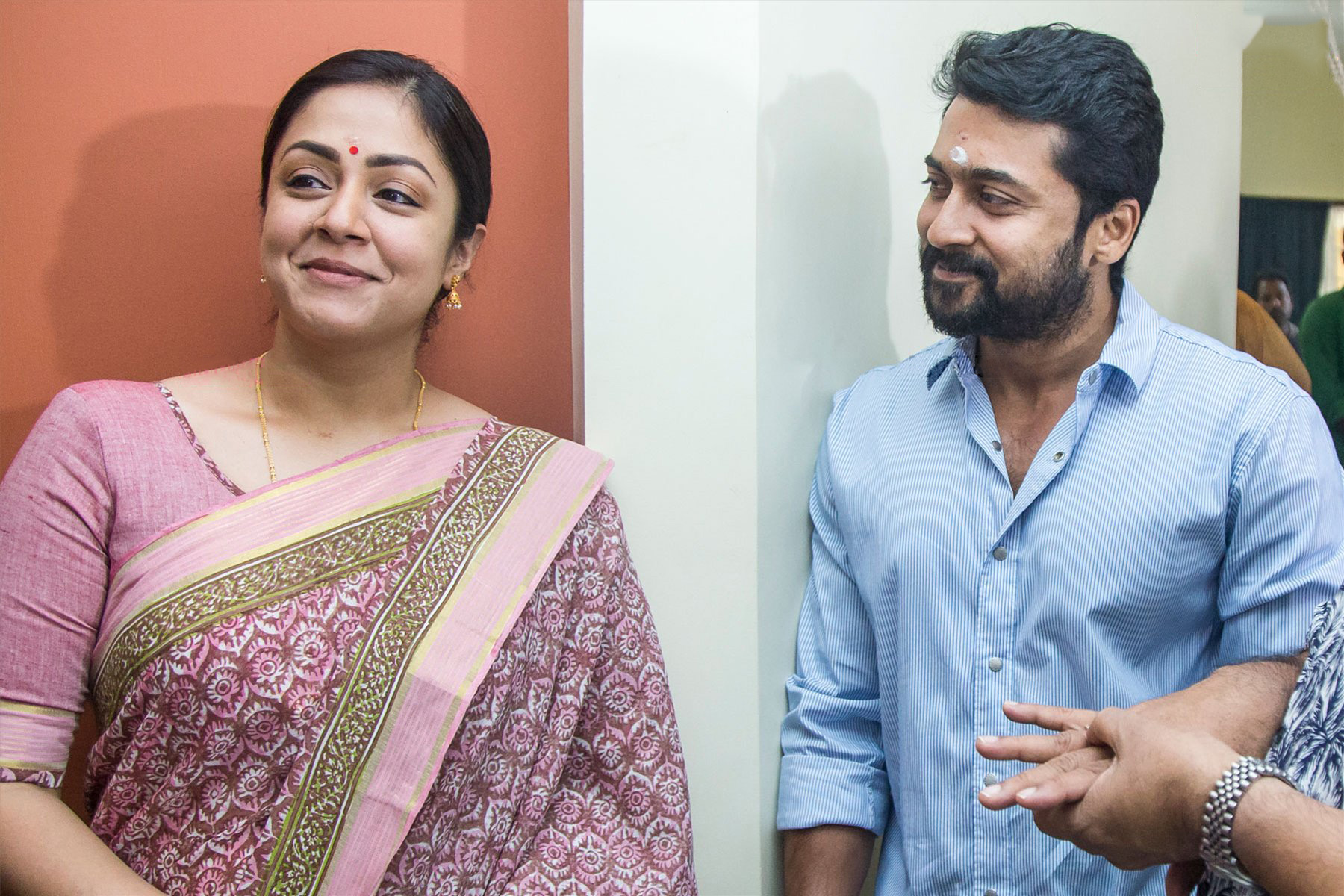
Jyothika along with Suriya during the puja of the film.

Principal photography began on 4 June 2018, and ended in 40 working days. The first look poster which was revealed by Jyothika's husband Suriya on 15 August 2018 (Independence Day) and features her carrying a placard with "Ten Commandments for Women". It was seen as a satirical comment at the "restrictions" placed on women by society. Stills showing Jyothika in an unembellished avatar, playing with a pet pigeon released revealing her character along with its release date as 18 October.

== Soundtrack ==
Kaatrin Mozhi

Soundtrack album by A.H. Kaashif
- Released: 2018
- Recorded: 2018
- Genre: Soundtrack
- Length: 14:16
- Labels: Lahari Music; T-Series
- Producer: A. H. Kaashif

A.H. Kaashif chronology
Kaatrin Mozhi (2018)	Pathinettam Padi (2019)

The soundtracks and background music was composed by debutant A. H. Kaashif, nephew of A. R. Rahman. The music was programmed by Suryansh Jain, songs were mixed by Pradeep Menon and mastered by Suresh Permal at AM Studios, Chennai. The lyrics were written by Madhan Karky.

Track listing
No.	Title	Singer(s)	Length
1.	"Kelambitale Vijayalakshmi"	Nakul Abhyankar	2:57
2.	"Dirty Pondatti"	Benny Dayal, Swagatha S Krishnan	3:48
3.	"Po Urave"	Sid Sriram	3:23
4.	"Rekkai Thulirtha"	Jonita Gandhi	2:58
5.	"Po Urave suite"	A. H. Kaashif	1:13
Total length:			14:16

== Critical reception ==
V Lakshmi of The Times of India gave 3.5 stars and summarised, "This remake of Tumhari Sulu is an engaging entertainer that manages to retain the spirit of the original". Anjana Shekar from The News Minute wrote "Jyothika wins your heart as Viji in this comedy drama". Srinivasa Ramanujam of The Hindu wrote, "This Radhamohan flick is a refreshing remake that strikes the right notes." Priyanka Sundar of Hindustan Times gave it 3 out of 5 stars and wrote, "Jyotika succeeds by not giving you the opportunity to compare her to Vidya Balan at any moment." Janani K of India Today wrote that the film "evokes laughter here and there. However, it falls short of being a faithful remake of Tumhari Sulu".
