= Payanigal Gavanikkavum =

2022 Indian film

- Film poster
- Directed by: S. P. Shakthivel
- Screenplay by: S. P. Shakthivel
- Based on: Vikruthi (Malayalam)
- Produced by: T. Vijaya Raghavendra
- Starring: Vidharth; Karunakaran; Lakshmi Priyaa Chandramouli
- Cinematography: S. Pandikumar
- Edited by: R. S. Sathishkumar
- Music by: Shanmanth Nag
- Production company: All In Pictures
- Distributed by: Aha
- Release date: 29 April 2022
- Running time: 115 minutes
- Country: India
- Language: Tamil

Payanigal Gavanikkavum (transl. Passengers take note) is a 2022 Indian Tamil-language comedy drama film directed by S. P. Shakthivel and produced by All In Pictures. The film stars Vidharth and Karunakaran with a supporting cast including Lakshmi Priyaa Chandramouli, Masoom Shankar, and Prem Kumar. The film's music is composed by Shanmanth Nag, with cinematography handled by S. Pandikumar and editing done by R. S. Sathishkumar. The film is a remake of the 2019 Malayalam film Vikruthi written by Ajeesh P. Thomas and directed by Emcy Joseph. The film premiered on Aha on 29 April 2022.

== Plot ==
Ezhilan and his wife Tamil are both hearing and speech impaired. After spending two nights in the hospital where his daughter was admitted, Ezhilan travels back home on a Chennai Metro train but he falls asleep. Another passenger, Antony, finds this amusing and decides to post a picture of Ezhilan online, labelling him a drunkard. The rest of the movie explores the troubles Ezhilan and his family face when he is recognized by people as the "Chennai Metro Drunkard", as well as how Antony deals with the consequences of his actions.

== Cast ==
- Vidharth as Ezhilan
- Karunakaran as Antony
- Lakshmi Priyaa Chandramouli as Tamizh
- Masoom Shankar as Jessy
- Prem Kumar as Inspector K. Raja Narayanan
- RJ Sarithiran
- Kavithalayaa Krishnan
- Dhachani Santha Soruban
- R. S. Shivaji
- Munnar Ramesh
- Ramachandran Durairaj
- Rekha Sivan

== Production ==
The film was announced directly Digital Premier by Aha (streaming service) . The film is a remake of the Malayalam film Vikruthi. The film trailer was released on 24 April 2022.

== Reception ==
The film premiered on Aha on 29 April 2022. Sruthi Raman of The Times of India cited that "This dramedy explores the double-sidedness of social media" and further wrote that "While the film does have a needed message for the internet generation of our times, it’s not as breezy as it intends to be". S Subhakeerthana from OTTPlay noted that "Payanigal Gavanikkavum makes us smile, laugh and cry. The film is simple, yet compelling, and is worth a watch." Gave 3 out of 5 Rating. Dinamalar Critic gave 3 out 5 rating for the film.
