= Swathishta =

Indian actress and television host

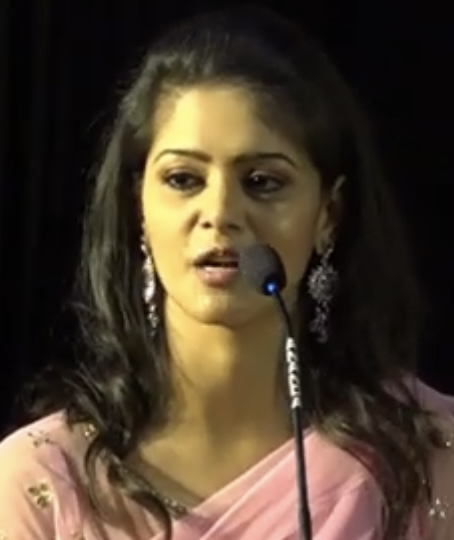
- Swathishta at the press meet of Ondu Sarala Prema Kathe
- Born: Swathishta Krishnan; 8 April 1996 (age 30); Madurai, Tamil Nadu, India
- Other name: Swathi
- Education: Bachelors in Electronics & Instrumentation
- Occupations: Actress; Television Host
- Years active: 2017 – present

Swathishta Krishnan (born 8 April 1996) known professionally as Swathishta is an Indian actress and who works predominantly in Tamil and Kannada language films. She made her acting debut in a supporting role with 2018 Tamil film Savarakathi. She also acted in the film Kee (2019).

== Career ==
After graduation, she acted in Madras Central's web series named Half Boil, released in 2017 along with Gopi and Sudhakar. In 2018, she made her debut in films specifically Tamil films and acted in the film Savarakathi alongside Ram and Shamna Kasim. In 2019, she also acted in the film Kee opposing actor Jiiva. She also acted in films such as Jada (2019) and Vikram (2022). She also appeared in the Telugu music video Entha Baavundo in 2021. She also hosted the show Compass Countdown on Puthuyugam TV.

In 2023, director Suni roped in Swathishta for his Kannada film Ondu Sarala Prema Kathe. During an interview, Suni said “I was clear that I wanted a Kannadada hudugi, which has been my priority with all my films. I had watched Swathishta in Vikram and was impressed by how she carried her role. I was happy when I learned she was our own Uttara Karnataka hudugi. She matched our criteria, and we had her on board”. Her character in the movie was well received by the audience and the critics had praised her performance.

== Filmography ==
Key
†	Denotes films that have not yet been released

=== Films ===
Year	Title	Role	Launguage	Notes	Ref.
2017	Half Boil	Pritha	Tamil	Web series	
2018	Savarakathi	Kayal	Tamil		
2019	Kee	Anu	Tamil		
2019	Jada	Lakshmi	Tamil		
2022	Vikram	Prabhanjan's wife	Tamil	Cameo appearance	
2024	Ondu Sarala Prema Kathe	Anuraga	Kannada		
2026	Rakkasapuradhol	Roopa	Kannada		

=== Music video ===
Year	Show	Notes	Ref.
2021	Entha Baavundo	Telugu song	
2021	Enna Vazhka Da	Tamil song	
