= Gurusamy =

- Directed by: K. R. Vishnaanth
- Written by: K. R. Vishnaanth
- Produced by: Thulasimaran
- Starring: Manikandan; Udhayathara; Delhi Ganesh
- Cinematography: K. G. Srinivasan
- Edited by: Priyan
- Music by: Vasanthamani
- Production company: Channel R Five Production
- Release date: 2 December 2011
- Running time: 120 minutes
- Country: India
- Language: Tamil

Gurusamy is a 2011 Indian Tamil-language Hindu mythological film directed by K. R. Vishnaanth and starring Manikandan, Udhayathara and Delhi Ganesh in the titular role. The movie is based on the devotees of Ayyappan.

== Plot ==
Gurusamy narrates several small stories to his followers. He tells them of Subramani, a religious follower of Ayyappan, and his father, a loan shark. In an attempt to change his father's greed, Subramani climbs a mountain and puts a garland of flowers on it. Ayyappan protects people who were tricked by loan sharks and unable to pay the loan.

He also tells them how Ayyappan reunited Poongodi and her abusive husband, Vembu. Vembu becomes a Ayyappan devotee and reforms, solving the couple's problems.

== Cast ==
- Manikandan as Subramani
- Udhayathara as Poongodi
- Delhi Ganesh as Gurusamy a.k.a. Ayyappan
- Prem Kumar as Vembu
- Vadivukkarasi as the evil priest
- Alex as an Ayyappan devotee
- Bava Lakshmanan as the cook
- Nellai Siva as a police officer
- Scissor Manohar as a kid's father
- Bonda Mani
- Vijay Ganesh as a kid's father
- Amirthalingam
- Kambam Meena as the drunkard's wife
- Suryakanth
- Kottachi as the drunkard
- Veeramanidasan as the religious man
- Vellai Subbaiah
- Kallukkul Eeram Ramanathan
- Nambirajan
- Sugothevan

=== Special appearances ===
- Saravanan as Karuppu Sami
- Vidharth as an Ayyappan devotee (in the song "Thengaayil Nei")
- Soori as an Ayyappan devotee (in the song "Thengaayil Nei")
- Shankar–Ganesh as himself (in the song "Thengaayil Nei")
- K. Sivasankar as himself (in the song "Sabarimalai Yaathirai")

== Production ==
The film began production in late 2010.

== Soundtrack ==
The music was composed by Vasanthamani. The lyrics were written by Yugabharathi and Annamalai.

Track listing
No.	Title	Singer(s)	Length
1.	"Thengaaiyil Nei"	Velmurugan	4:31
2.	"Sabarimalai Yaathirai"	Manikka Vinayagam	4:41
3.	"Punniyam Thedi"	Anbulla Maran	4:26
4.	"Naanga Banthatta"	Mukesh	4:40
5.	"Imaigaail Moodi"	Veeramanidasan, Narve Jayaraj	5:26
6.	"Eli Varuthu"	Veeramanidasan	3:32
Total length:			27:06

== Reception ==
A critic from Dinamalar wrote that the film "is a lively collection of stories and lessons taught by Ayyappan Swami to his devotees". A critic from Kungumam wrote that "After a long gap, this film tells about the glory of Swami Ayyappan".
