= Vikruthi =

2019 film directed by Emcy Joseph

Vikrithi
- Theatrical release poster
- Directed by: Emcy Joseph
- Written by: Ajeesh P. Thomas
- Produced by: A. D. Sreekumar; Ganesh Menon; Lakshmi Warrier
- Starring: Suraj Venjarammoodu; Soubin Shahir
- Cinematography: Alby
- Edited by: Ayoob Khan
- Music by: Bijibal
- Production company: Cut 2 Create Pictures
- Distributed by: Century Release
- Release date: 4 October 2019
- Running time: 123 minutes
- Country: India
- Language: Malayalam

Vikruthi (transl. Mischief) is a 2019 Indian Malayalam-language comedy drama film directed by Emcy Joseph and produced by A. D. Sreekumar, Ganesh Menon and Lakshmi Warrier. The film stars Suraj Venjarammoodu and Soubin Shahir in the lead roles. The film is based on true events that occurred on a Kochi Metro train, where a picture of a sleeping hearing/speech-impaired man was taken and shared online by a passenger assuming he was drunk. It upsets the man and his family after it goes viral. The film was released on 4 October 2019. The film was remade in Tamil as Payanigal Gavanikkavum (2022).

== Plot ==
Eldho and his wife Elsy are both a hearing and speech impaired couple. After two spending restless nights in the hospital where his daughter was admitted, Eldho travels back home on a Kochi Metro train but he falls asleep. Sameer, a passenger who is an NRI based in Sharjah, finds this amusing and decides to post a picture of Eldho online, labelling him a drunkard. The rest of the movie explores the troubles Eldho and his family face when he is recognized by people as the "Kochi Metro Drunkard", as well as how Sameer deals with the consequences of his actions.

== Cast ==
- Suraj Venjarammoodu as Eldho
- Soubin Shahir as Sameer Muhammed
- Vincy Aloshious as Zeenath
- Surabhi Lakshmi as Elsy
- Mamukkoya as Muhammad
- Mamitha Baiju as Suhara
- Gracy Soudi as Khadeejumma
- Pauly Valsan as Reethamma
- Jaffar Idukki as Varghese
- Irshad as Nazar
- Riya Saira as Sajitha
- Baburaj as CI Siju Varkey
- Sudhi Koppa as Bineesh
- Bhagath Manuel as Elleyas
- Sudheer Karamana as Prabhalan
- Nebish Benson as Basil
- Mareena Michael Kurisingal as Bella Varghese
- Meghanathan as Hassan
- Balu Varghese as Salim
- Shivaji Guruvayoor as Advocate Freddy

== Production ==
The film marks the debut of Emcy Joseph as a film director. He is the founder of PERAKA MEDIA, the AD Film Production House in Kochi. He has also published LAVA, a collection of eight stories written in a cinematic style.

== Soundtrack ==
Vikruthi

Soundtrack album by Bijibal
- Released: 28 September 2019
- Recorded: 2019
- Studio: Bodhi
- Genre: Feature film soundtrack
- Language: Malayalam
- Label: Manorama Music

Bijibal chronology
| Subharathri (2019) | Vikruthi (2019) | Adhyarathri (2019) |

The soundtrack was composed by Bijibal with lyrics by Santhosh Varma.

Track listings
| No. | Title | Singer(s) | Length |
|---|---|---|---|
| 1. | "Kaanumbol" | Ramshi Ahamed | 2:22 |
| 2. | "Chillayile" | Harishankar K. S. | 3:40 |
| 3. | "Ividoru" | Chako | 3:22 |
| 4. | "Mathiyolam" | Bijipal | 2:49 |
| 5. | "Vidarum" | Mridul Nair | 2:29 |

== Release ==
The film was released theatrically on 4 October 2019.

=== Box office ===
The film grossed approximately ₹3.85 crore in its first week run in Kerala.

== Accolades ==
- Kerala State Film Award for Best Actor - Suraj Venjaramoodu
