= Savarakathi =

- Theatrical release poster
- Directed by: G. R. Adithya
- Written by: Mysskin
- Produced by: Mysskin
- Starring: Ram; Poorna; Mysskin
- Cinematography: Karthik Venkatraman
- Edited by: S. Julian
- Music by: Arrol Corelli
- Production company: Lonewolf Productions
- Release date: 9 February 2018
- Running time: 114 minutes
- Country: India
- Language: Tamil

Savarakathi (transl. Shaving razor) is a 2018 Indian Tamil-language black comedy thriller film directed by G. R. Adithya, written and produced by his brother Mysskin. The film stars Ram, Poorna and Mysskin, with Ashvatt, Neelambari and Swathishta in supporting roles. The directorial debut of Adithya, it revolves around a barber who has a skirmish with a gangster, and goes into hiding to evade his wrath. The film was released on 9 February 2018.

== Plot ==
Pitchai Moorthy, a barber, lives with his hearing-impaired pregnant wife Subadhra and their two children. Once he has a skirmish with a gangster named Mangeswaran "Manga" and goes into hiding when Manga swears to exact revenge before sundown.

== Cast ==
- Ram as Pitchai Moorthy "Pitchai"
- Poorna as Subadhra
- Mysskin as Mangeswaran "Manga"
- Ashvatt as Gautaman
- Neelambari as Moorthy and Subhadra's daughter
- Swathishta as Kayal
- Shaji Chen as a mentally challenged man (cameo appearance)

== Production ==
Mysskin, the producer and writer of Savarakathi, stated that he was inspired to write the script based on a real barber he knew who was a habitual liar. Mysskin's brother, G. R. Adithya, made his directorial debut after previously apprenticing under filmmakers such as R. Parthiban and Mysskin himself. Adithya had initially been contracted to make a film for a different production studio but after the project got shelved, he convinced Mysskin to give him an opportunity to direct the project. Another director, Ram, was signed on to play the lead role of the barber, with Adithya keen on selecting someone with an "innocent" face. Ram initially refused the offer, as he felt that the film would undo his public image of being a serious filmmaker, but later accepted to feature in the project.

Poorna was selected after six other actresses, including Priyamani, refused to be part of the film. The actress revealed that she would play a hearing-impaired pregnant woman, and prior to the start of shoot, she took part in a ten-day workshop where she learnt to speak the Sivaganga slang and was taught how to portray the character by Adithya. Adithya chose to take inspiration for the role from the personality and body language of his and Mysskin's own mother. Ashvatt, who previously appeared in Mysskin's directorial ventures Pisaasu (2014) and Thupparivaalan (2017), was signed on to play a key role in Savarakathi, while television anchor Swathishta also joined the cast, making her film debut.

== Music ==
The music was composed by Arrol Corelli.

Track list
| No. | Title | Lyrics | Singer(s) | Length |
|---|---|---|---|---|
| 1. | "Annaanthu Paar" | Thamizhachi Thangapandian | Madhu Iyer | 4:39 |
| 2. | "Thangakathi" | Mysskin | Mysskin | 4:26 |
| 3. | "All The World Is A Stage" (instrumental) | — | — | 0:33 |
| 4. | "Pichai The Barber" (instrumental) | — | — | 1:14 |
| 5. | "The Trickster" (instrumental) | — | — | 0:37 |
| 6. | "Footsteps" (instrumental) | — | — | 1:40 |
| 7. | "Farce" (instrumental) | — | — | 0:51 |
| 8. | "Hold Me" (instrumental) | — | — | 0:38 |
| Total length: | | | | 14:38 |

== Reception ==
Ashameera Aiyappan of The Indian Express wrote, "Savarakathi is an odd film that is tough to slot. It doesn't floor you in amazement. But it keeps you hooked with its weird charm". Karthik Kumar of Hindustan Times wrote, "Mysskin's maiden attempt at full-length comedy is proof that maybe it's not his forte, but the way everything culminates in the climax is poignant and quite emotional, reminding us once again why he's one of the best writers of our times". Sudhir Srinivasan of Cinema Express wrote, "This is the film in which Mysskin seems to have truly exercised his funny bone. We know he's always had a great sense of humour, given that even his darkest films have had some wonderfully funny moments". Sreedhar Pillai wrote for Firstpost, "Savarakathi works to a large extent due to its quirky theme and presentation, including the realistic ending. The film has the Mysskin touch and is an adequate answer to his critics who feel that he cannot make a film which has humour built into it". Rakesh Meher of The News Minute wrote, "Savarakathi may not rank as a comic classic. But it has enough going for it to merit at least one watch".

Kirubhakar Purushothaman of India Today wrote, "Director GR Adithya is among the few who actually get the genre of black comedy or dark comedy right. [...] With no extraordinary setting or caricaturish characters, the film effortlessly makes you crack up, all along". Srinivasa Ramanujam of The Hindu appreciated the film primarily for the cast performances, especially Mysskin and Ram, and noted that the film had many traits of Mysskin's directorial filmography despite not being directed by him. M. Suganth of The Times of India wrote, "For much of the film, Aadithyaa keeps us laughing with the situations getting more absurd as the film progresses. The pace is quite breathless, befitting a film that is essentially one long chase, and the humour is often of the laugh-out-loud variety but at times, quite subtle". DT Next lauded the performances of Poorna, Mysskin and Ram, along with the dark humour and background score. Sify wrote, "The film's writer Mysskin has rightly blended humor, emotion and value of humanity to keep the audiences engrossed and also conveys a touching message without being preachy", also praising the music and cinematography.
