= Nandalala =

- Theatrical release poster
- Directed by: Mysskin
- Written by: Mysskin
- Based on: Kikujiro by: Takeshi Kitano
- Produced by: K. Karunamoorthy; C. Arunpandian
- Starring: Mysskin; Snigdha Akolkar; Ashwath Ram
- Cinematography: Mahesh Muthuswami
- Edited by: MP Ravichandran
- Music by: Ilaiyaraaja
- Production company: Ayngaran International
- Release date: 26 November 2010
- Running time: 125 minutes
- Country: India
- Language: Tamil

Nandalala is a 2010 Indian Tamil-language road drama film written and directed by Mysskin. He himself plays the lead role, alongside newcomer Ashwath Ram and Snigdha Akolkar. The film, which is produced by Ayngaran International and scored by Ilaiyaraaja, is based on the 1999 Japanese film Kikujiro, and partly inspired from Mysskin's life. It illustrates the road journey of a mentally challenged adult and an eight-year-old schoolboy, both in search of their respective mothers.

Mysskin began developing Nandalala in 2006, penning the scriptment for eight months. Supposed to be filmed, after the release of Mysskin's debut film Chithiram Pesuthadi (2006), the film was shelved since no producer came forward to fund the film, and was launched only in 2008, after the release of Myshkin's second film Anjathe (2008). It was completed by December 2008, but got stuck in development hell later, with no distributors willing to release the film.

Following numerous preview shows and screenings at several film festivals, the film eventually released on 26 November 2010. It received critical acclaim but fared poorly at the box office.

== Plot ==
The film illustrates the road journey of two people, a mentally challenged adult and an eight-year-old schoolboy, both in search of their respective mothers.

== Cast ==
- Mysskin as Bhaskar Mani
- Ashwath Ram as Akhilesh
- Snigdha Akolkar as Anjali
- Nassar as a lorry driver
- Rohini as a Mentally ill woman
- Kalaiyarasan as a Drunkard
- Leena Maria Paul

== Production ==
After Mysskin had completed and released his directorial debut Chithiram Pesuthadi in 2006, he wrote the script for Nandalala for eight months, which was supposed to be his next directorial. A. M. Rathnam was initially to produce the film, for which his son Ravi Krishna was to play the lead role. Despite completing a photo shoot with Ravi Krishna, the film was shelved since Rathnam opted out after he incurred heavy losses with his previous productions. Mysskin decided to postpone the project since "nobody was interested", and instead wrote a new story and commenced a new project, which itself was a result of Mysskin's anger. That film was Anjathe, which released in 2008, following which Mysskin re-commenced Nandalala, taking up the lead role himself, after several lead actors from the Tamil film industry had rejected the offer, fearing of "their image would get damaged".

Mysskin revealed, that despite demands from the producers, he made no compromises to Nandalala, in contrast to his previous ventures, as Nandalala was his "dream project". The lead character, Bhaskar Mani, was initially supposed to be around 20 years old; however, as no actor, including Vikram, was willing to take the role and Mysskin decided to play the character, he changed the age to 27 to make it more suitable. For the seven-year-old schoolboy character, newcomer Ashwath Ram was selected, after over 100 children were auditioned. Snigdha Akolkar, who had performed an item number in Anjathe, was chosen to enact the lead female character, while Rohini was signed to play the mother of Bhaskar Mani. Nandhalala was initially Snigdha's debut Tamil film, for which Mysskin had signed her in 2006 already, but with the film getting postponed, she made her first appearance in Anjathe. Filming began in 2008 and was completed in 81 days, with major portions being shot in Gobichettipalayam and Sathyamangalam forests.

== Soundtrack ==
After working with Sundar C. Babu for both his previous films, Mysskin opted to collaborate with Ilaiyaraaja for Nandalala's music. The soundtrack album to this film was released on 14 January 2009, during Pongal. The album features 6 tracks while, however, only two of them were included in the final version. Ilaiyaraaja had performed three songs himself, one of which "Oru vandu Kootame" along with his grandson and Karthik Raja's eldest son Yatheeshwaran. The sixth song in the album "Elilea Elilea" was written and sung by a gypsy woman called Saroja Ammal in her mother tongue.

Mysskin stated that he had requested Ilaiyaraaja to come up with a song that should be "enjoyed and appreciated by the likes of a hunter in an African cave". Ilaiyaraaja, hence, composed a "simple" and "minimalized" score and had written a symphonic piece, using only three instruments, a flute, an oboe and a violin, for which three specialised Hungarian artists from the Budapest Festival Orchestra were invited.

Track listing
| No. | Title | Lyrics | Singer(s) | Length |
|---|---|---|---|---|
| 1. | "Melle Oorndhu Oorndhu" | Na. Muthukumar | Ilaiyaraaja |
| 2. | "Onnukkonnu" | Mu. Metha | K. J. Yesudas |
| 3. | "Thalaattu Ketka Nanum" | Ilaiyaraaja | Ilaiyaraaja |
| 4. | "Kai Veesi" | Palani Bharathi | Vijay Yesudas, Shweta Mohan, Madhu Balakrishnan, Raagul, Chandrasekar |
| 5. | "Oru Vandu Koottame" | Kabilan | Ilaiyaraaja, Master Yatheeswaran |
| 6. | "Elilea Elilea" | Saroja Ammal | Saroja Ammal |

== Release ==
Made on a budget of ₹ 3.5 crore, Nandalala's release faced delays. Finally it was released on 26 November 2010, one-a-half years after its completion, facing opposition from Kanimozhi. Before the wide theatrical release on 26 November, the film was screened several times at film festivals and as preview shows to prominent filmmakers, actors and distributors. Following one such preview show, actor-director Kamal Haasan had described the film as an "excellent, must-watch film", unsuccessfully recommending Sun Pictures to distribute the film. At the Norway Film Festival, the film won the Critics' and People's Choice Awards. Though the film received critical acclaim after its theatrical release, it fared poorly at the box office with the media attributing this to its lack of entertainment value.

== Reception ==
After its theatrical release, the film received critical acclaim. The Hindu's Malathi Rangarajan, too gave a very positive verdict, calling it the "real road film" that is made "for seekers of worthy cinema". Further praising the director, she cites that Mysskin "rises high above the standards he set with the earlier quality cocktails" and that "Tamil cinema needs more creators like him". Pavithra Srinivasan of Rediff.com rated the film four out five describing Nandalala as "brilliant", eventually finding a place in the list of her "Best Tamil films of 2010" article.

As per Sify, a "popular English daily" had given the film four and a half out five, the highest rating it has given for any Tamil film. Meanwhile, trade analyst Sreedhar Pillai in his review for Sify, described Nandalala as "another heart wrenching story" that was "slow and melancholic", claiming it was for people "like films that explores the realms of anguish and despair". The New Indian Express review tributed Ilaiyaraaja for an "outstanding" background score, it criticised Mysskin for replicating "not just the concept, but almost the entire graph of the plot and narration" of Kikujiro, labelling it as "blatant plagiarism". The critic added that it is "not just an embarrassment to the maker, but to the viewer too".
