= Veeramanidasan =

Veeramani Daasan

Background information
- Origin: Tamil Nadu, India
- Genres: Devotional, playback singer
- Occupation: Singer

Veeramani Daasan is an Indian singer of devotional songs and cinema songs. He received the Harivarasanam Award for the year 2024 from the Kerala state and Devosom Board.

Veeramani Daasan reportedly led a music troupe named "Sruti Laya" during the initial part of his career. Through his association with this music troupe, he was involved in creating music that wasn't strictly devotional in nature. He transitioned to making devotional music at a much more regular frequency during the latter part of his career.

He has had a brief stint as a playback singer for Indian movies, lasting 7 years. Beginning with Ramanuja Suprabhatham, Veeramani Daasan has come out with many albums including the recent "Amman Kovil". He has sung more than 6000 songs. He reportedly travels extensively for concerts. He makes devotional music not just in Tamil, but also in Kannada and Telugu too. He shot to fame with the popular devotional song "Yellam Valla Thaye". Despite the similarity of the last name, he has no relation with the Veeramani family, an established family also of Tamil origin.

== Albums ==
Album/Songs by Veeramani daasan	Year
Film: Andava Kaanom Song: Nerunji Kaatil Music: Aswamitra Lyrics: Mathura Kavi	2017
Thupparivu 2020 | Tamil Musical Album | How to #cleanindia | SUBTITLED | Bilingual	2017
Dharani the movie*Veeramani Daasan	2014
Mamalai Sabari	2014
Arul Tharum Saayee	2012
Swamy Thindhagathom Thom – Ayyappan Album	2012
Sandhanam Manakkudu – Ayyappan Album	2011
2 film songs (Imaigaail Moodi, Eli Varuthu): Gurusamy	2011
A film song (Uyya Uyaa): Mudhal Idam	2011
Sabarimalai Jothy Malai	2006
108 Amman Poojai	
Aarattu
Aadivarum Kaavadi	
Aanjaneya Sri Aanjaneya	
Aarupadai Veedu	
Aayiram Kannudayaal	
Arultharum Amma	
Ayya Saami Maare	
Gurunadha Vol – 2	
Irumudi	
Iyyappan Padalgal Vol – 1	
Kallum Mullum Kaalukku Methai	
Kurimedai	
Maariamman Thaalaattu	
Maasaani Viratham	
Mundhi Mundhi Vinaayagane	
Om Ganapathi Om – Veeramanidasan	
Saamimare Ayyapamare	
Sakthi – Veeramanidasan	
Thirupathi Malaivaasa	
Udukai Oli Osaiyile	
Vaaraaru Pillaiyaaru Vaaraaru	
Vandhanam Vandhanam Pillaiyaarae	
Varam Tharum Ganapathy	
Villakku Poojai	
Vinayagar Thiruvilaiyadal	
Saami	
Yellaam Valla Thaayae Veeramani Dasan	
108 Lakshmi Narasimhar	
Soolame thunai	
