= Kingston (film) =

- Theatrical release poster
- Directed by: Kamal Prakash
- Written by: Kamal Prakash; Dhivek Sekar (dialogues)
- Produced by: G. V. Prakash Kumar; Bhavani Sre; Umesh KR Bansal
- Starring: G. V. Prakash Kumar; Divyabharathi
- Cinematography: Gokul Benoy
- Edited by: San Lokesh
- Music by: G. V. Prakash Kumar
- Production companies: Zee Studios; Parallel Universe Pictures
- Distributed by: Colors Frames Alagappan III
- Release date: 7 March 2025
- Country: India
- Language: Tamil
- Budget: est. ₹20 crore
- Box office: est. ₹5.35 crore

Kingston (also marketed as Kingston and the Cursed Sea) is a 2025 Indian Tamil-language fantasy horror adventure film directed by Kamal Prakash, in his directorial debut. It is produced by G. V. Prakash Kumar, who also enacts in the lead role, Bhavani Sre and Umesh KR Bansal, under Parallel Universe Pictures and Zee Studios. The cast also includes Divyabharathi, Elango Kumaravel, Sabumon Abdusamad and Chetan.

The film was officially announced in October 2023 under the tentative title GV 25, as it is Prakash's 25th film in the lead role, and the official title was announced a few days later. Principal photography commenced the same month. The film has music composed by G. V. Prakash Kumar, cinematography handled by Gokul Benoy and editing by San Lokesh.

Kingston was theatrically released on 7 March 2025 and received mixed reviews from critics.

== Plot ==
Fishing is banned at the coast of Thoovathur, Thoothukudi district despite being a coastal hamlet whose main source of income is from fishing. Rumour has it that the sea is cursed and the fishermen who venture out into the waters never return. Kingston "King", one of the fisherfolks in the hamlet, is the handyman of Thomas, the kingpin of the smuggling trade of the region. Things get complicated when Kingston gets to know that he is being used to smuggle drugs instead of sea cucumbers, and decides to venture out into the haunted sea by himself, only to unearth dark secrets of the past.

Kingston ventures out at sea by taking hostage of Thomas and his two men to reveal the truth to the people by catching the fish. During their journey they face sea full of skeletons and later, they enter a foggy area and face the zombie-like dead. Kingston then decides to take Bose's coffin and bury it in the island to break the curse.

Later, when Kingston tries to take the coffin, Thomas escapes and captures Kingston. He then reveals that Bose was innocent. It was Thomas' grandfather who was smuggling the gold. Thomas killed his grandfather for the gold but couldn't find it. Actually, it is the corpse of Kings' grandfather Solomon in Bose's coffin. Thomas threatens Solomon's ghost to leave him or he will kill his grandson Kingston, but Solomon's ghost kills Thomas.

Solomon's ghost tells Kingston to take the gold but to leave his friends to die. Kingston chooses his friends over the gold and takes the coffin out of the sea. Later, he and his friends bury Solomon's body due to which the curse is broken and fish return to the sea. Finally, people resume fishing as before.

== Cast ==
- G. V. Prakash Kumar as Kingston 'King'
  - Sucil as Young Kingston
- Divyabharathi as Rose
- Chetan as Solomon
- Azhagam Perumal as Stephen Bose
- Elango Kumaravel as Martin
  - Sharath as Young Martin
- Sabumon Abdusamad as Thomas
  - Kira as Young Thomas
- Kalloori Vinoth as Dasan
- Antony as Libin
  - R. Tharun as Young Libin
- Praveen as Benjamin
  - Master U Tharun Chakravarthy as Young Benjamin
- Arunachaleswaran as Philips
  - R. Sriram as Young Philips
- Rajesh Balachandiran as Godson
  - VishavRaaj V as Young Godson
- Ram Nishanth as Soosai
- Fara Shibla as Stella, Godson's Wife
- Niranjan Moses as Simon
- Gangadharan as Ivan
- Dheena as Robert
- Rajkumar Manthirapandi as Alex
- Shasha as Merlin
- Vijay Krishna as Gothra
- Subramanyam Shiva as Peter
- Dharmesh Kubendiran as Father

== Production ==
=== Development ===
In early October 2023, it was reported that music composer-turned-actor G. V. Prakash Kumar would turn as producer for his 25th film in the lead role. He would produce it with an estimate budget of ₹20 crore (US$2.1 million) in association with Zee Studios. On 9 October, the project was officially announced by the new production banner Parallel Universe Pictures, tentatively titled GV 25. It is directed by Kamal Prakash, who previously had worked with Prakash in Kadhalikka Yaarum Illa (2016). Divyabharathi, who also previously acted alongside Prakash in Bachelor (2021), was cast to play the lead actress role.

Two days later, the official title, Kingston, and the film's crew was revealed. A muhurat puja was held the same day in Chennai. The crew includes cinematographer Gokul Benoy, editor San Lokesh, art director S. S. Moorthy, stunt choreographer Dhilip Subbarayan, costume designer Poornima Ramaswamy, dialogue writer Divek S Sekar and publicity designer Gopi Prassana. Antony and Elango Kumaravel were announced being a part of cast.

=== Filming and post-production ===
Principal photography began with the first schedule on 5 October 2023 at a film studio in Chennai. Reportedly, the makers began filming by erecting a ship set. On 19 January 2025, G. V. Prakash Kumar announced that he has completed his portions, and on 8 February 2025, he announced that the dubbing process had begun.

== Music ==
Kingston

Soundtrack album by G. V. Prakash Kumar
- Genre: Feature film soundtrack
- Language: Tamil
- Label: Saregama
- Producer: G. V. Prakash Kumar

G. V. Prakash Kumar chronology
Nilavuku En Mel Ennadi Kobam (2025)	Kingston (2025)	Veera Dheera Sooran (2025)

Singles from Kingston
- 1. "Raasa Raasa" Released: 31 January 2025; 2. "Manda Bathram" Released: 15 February 2025; 3. "Kingston Title Track" Released: 1 March 2025; 4. "Kanmani Raaasathi" Released: 28 March 2025; 5. "Makkamaaru" Released: 27 March 2025; 6. "Yelavele" Released: 26 March 2025

The music and background score is composed by G. V. Prakash Kumar. The audio rights were acquired by Saregama. The first single "Raasa Raasa" released on 31 January 2025. The second single "Manda Bathram" released on 15 February 2025. The third single "Kingston Title Track" having lyrics written by Kaber Vasuki and Arunraja Kamaraj and sung by them along with Smith Asher was released on 1 March 2025.

Track listing
No.	Title	Lyrics	Singer(s)	Length
1.	"Raasa Raasa"	Yugabharathi	G. V. Prakash Kumar, Sublahshini
2.	"Manda Bathram"		Gana Francis
3.	"Kingston Title Track"	Kaber Vasuki, Arunraja Kamaraj	Smith Asher, Kaber Vasuki, Arunraja Kamaraj
4.	"Kanmani Raasathi"	Karthik Netha	Aavani Malhar
5.	"Yelavalele"	Arivu	Rockzanehere
6.	"Makkamaaru"	Arivu	Arivu

== Release ==
=== Theatrical ===
Kingston released in theatres on 7 March 2025. Apart from its original Tamil language, it was also released in the Hindi and Telugu languages. The film was certified U/A 16+ by the Central Board of Film Certification.

=== Home media ===
The premiered simultaneously on both ZEE5 and Zee Tamil on 13 April 2025.

== Reception ==
=== Critical response ===
Kausalya Rachavelpula of The Hans India gave 3/5 stars and wrote, "While Kingston is not without its flaws, it remains an intriguing attempt at blending folklore, suspense, and adventure. Its striking cinematography, atmospheric storytelling, and committed lead performance make it an engaging watch for those who appreciate mood-driven horror over outright scares". Abhinav Subramanian of The Times of India gave 2.5/5 stars and wrote "Nothing deflates a seafaring horror faster than skeletons that can’t seem to skeletonize anyone—leaving Kingston adrift in unnecessarily stormy narrative waters.[...] The muddled screenplay struggles to clearly communicate its complex mythology through dialogue that shifts between contemporary and regional dialect." Sanjay Ponnappa of India Today gave 2.5/5 stars and wrote "Overall, 'Kingston and the Cursed Sea' is an ambitious attempt at a genre rarely explored in Indian cinema. For its visual effects and the horror elements in the second half, the film could be deemed watchable." Baradwaj Rangan wrote for Galatta Plus, "Kingston could have been a fun equivalent of a page-turner, but the non-linear narration and the stabs at rootedness keep playing spoilsport."

Avinash Ramachandran of The Indian Express gave 2.5/5 stars and wrote "Kingston is trapped under its own weight of having to cramp up multiple storylines to set the stage for the showdown.[...] Kingston makes you feel like reading one of those fascinating pulp fiction stories that are not just radical and intriguing, but also knew never to overstay its welcome." Anusha Sundar of OTTPlay gave 2/5 stars and wrote "With its convoluted screenplay and no breathing space for character development, Kingston is a half-baked attempt to make a first-of-its-kind genre film. You will be in for a disappointment if you had thought Kingston would be genre loyal for its entirety." Prashanth Vallavan of Cinema Express gave 1.5/5 stars and wrote "Kingston seems to exhibit technical competency, and you could see how it could have offered an entertaining genre film.[...] However, when the pay-off is just them telling you it was never a magic show but a stand-up comedy routine all along, perhaps the joke is on you. "

Bhuvanesh Chandar of The Hindu wrote "The problem is that the narrative cuts back and forth in such a ragged rhythm that it hardly allows you to breathe in the world of Kingston. There’s no space for silences, punctuations or any scope for good drama.[...]The characters we follow are no cleverer than the stereotypical horror movie chumps with no survival instincts."
