= Aari Arujunan =

Indian actor

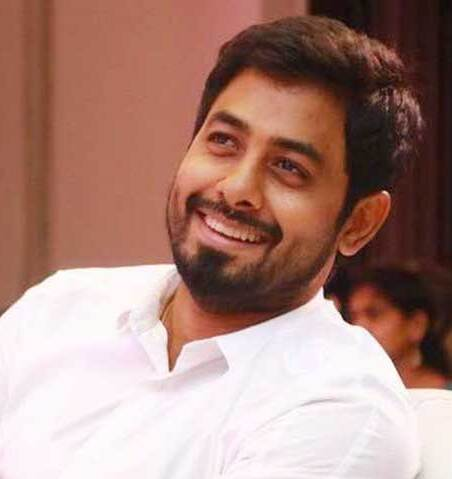
- Aari Arujunan at an NGO event
- Born: Palani, Dindigul District, Tamil Nadu, India
- Occupations: Actor, fitness coach
- Years active: 2005–present
- Spouse: Nathiya (m. 2015)
- Children: 2

Aari Arujunan is an Indian actor who has appeared in Tamil language films. He made his lead debut in Rettaisuzhi (2010) produced by director Shankar, before having a breakthrough performance in Nedunchaalai (2014) and starring in the supernatural thriller Maya (2015). In 2021, he emerged as the winner of the reality television show Bigg Boss 4.

== Career ==
Aari, before entering films, had background in theatre featuring in productions by Magic Lantern, Theatre Nisha and Inland Theatres. He appeared in a minor role in Alaiyadikkuthu (2005) and was later cast in the role in T. V. Chandran's Aadum Koothu (2006).

Aari made his lead debut in Rettaisuzhi (2010), produced by director Shankar. In October 2011, it was announced that Aari would feature in Maalai Pozhudhin Mayakathilaey and would star alongside winner of Miss South India 2010, Shubha Phutela. Aari mentioned that it was "really challenging to play an ordinary guy", as he had to consciously keep his emotions to a minimum at all times. Aari portrayed the lead role in N. Krishna's third venture, a romantic road trip film titled Nedunchaalai (2014), a period film set in the 1980, which took two years to complete. The film opened to positive reviews. His following venture, the comedy Kadai Enn 6, remains unreleased. Another venture Dharani directed by newcomer Guhan Sambandham, released in 2015, which did not perform well. In the same year, he played a pivotal role in Maya, a supernatural thriller alongside Nayanthara. It was a huge success at the box office and was critically acclaimed. In 2016, he was seen in Unnodu Ka, which performed average reviews. Later, he was cast in horror comedy Nagesh Thiraiyarangam in lead role opposite Ashna Zaveri.

In January 2021, he emerged as the title winner in the reality show Bigg Boss Tamil 4.

He has played a significant role in Nenjuku Needhi (2022), alongside Udhayanidhi Stalin directed by Arunraja Kamaraj, the official remake of critically acclaimed Hindi film Article 15. His next venture was the science fiction film Ellaam Mela Irukuravan Paathuppan (2023).

Aari Arjunan seen as the host in the reality show Vaa Thamizha Vaa. He has played in the legal drama series Good Wife. Aari Arjunan plays the protagonist in the psychological thriller, Fourth Floor (2026).

== Personal life ==
Aari was born in Palani, Tamil Nadu. He married Nathiya, a UK-based HR professional of Sri Lankan origin, on 18 November 2015 and the couple has two children; a girl named Riya (born 2016) and a son, Ranatheeran (born 2023).

He was a fitness coach before becoming actor.

As a social activist, he has supported Tamil culture, language and agriculture. In 2018, he started a 'தமிழ் கையொப்பம்' (Tamil Signature) movement where he wanted all the Tamil people to sign documents in Tamil script. He holds the Guinness Book of World Records for most signatures on a whiteboard. He also holds the Guinness World Record for planting approximately 30,000 seedlings with 20,000 participants, in a 15-acre land, in collaboration with Sathyabama University. In 2017, he actively participated in Jallikattu protests held in Marina beach, Chennai.

== Filmography ==
=== Film ===
Film performances
Year	Title	Role	Notes
2005	Alaiyadikkuthu	Brindha's husband	credited as Akhil Kumar
2006	Aadum Koothu	Muthu	credited as Akhil Kumar
2010	Rettaisuzhi	Murthy	
2012	Maalai Pozhudhin Mayakathilaey	Ajay	
2014	Nedunchaalai	Murugan	
2015	Dharani	Shekar	
2015	Maya	Vasanth / Arjun	
2016	Unnodu Ka	Siva	
2017	Mupparimanam	Himself	Special appearance in the song "Let's Go Party"
2018	Nagesh Thiraiyarangam	Nagesh	
2022	Nenjuku Needhi	Kumaran	
2023	Ellaam Mela Irukuravan Paathuppan	Ragu	Direct Television premiere on Colors Tamil
2024	Thiru.Manickam	Himself	Cameo appearance
2026	Fourth Floor	Dheeran	
2026	Gods and Soldiers	Iris	
2026	Navoria	TBA	

=== Television ===
Television performances
Year	Title	Role	Channel	Notes
2017	Manadhaal Inaivom Maatrathai Varaverppom - Zee Tamil Brand Film	Aari As Himself	Zee Tamil	Co-starring Jyothika, directed By Sudha Kongara Brand Shorts For Zee Tamil
2019	Vanakkam Tamizha	Guest	Sun TV	
2020–2021	Bigg Boss Tamil Season 4	Contestant	STAR Vijay	Winner
2021	Bigg Boss Season 4 Kondattam	Guest	STAR Vijay	Celebration of Bigg Boss Season 4
2021	Bharathi Kannamma & Raja Rani Season 2 Maha Sangamam	Himself	STAR Vijay	Special Appearance
2021	BB Jodigal	Guest	STAR Vijay	Grand Launch
2022	Namma Vettu Kalyanam	Guest	STAR Vijay Music	Couple Show; Along With Nathiya
2024	Cheran’s Journey	S. Pranav	SonyLIV	streaming web series
2024–present	Vaa Thamizha Vaa season 3	Host	Kalaignar TV	Reality debate show
2025	Good Wife	Hari Deepak	JioHotstar	Streaming web series
2026	Bigg Boss – The Common Man	Judge	JioHotstar; Star Vijay	Reality show

== Awards ==
Year	Cateogary	Awards	Notes
2021	Bigg Boss Tamil 4	Title Winner	He became the Title winner of the Reality Show
2018	FETNA	Guinness World Record	His Signature Campaign along with FETNA in America
2017	Transplanting Seedlings	Guinness World Record	Transplanting Seedlings with 3000 students from Sathyabhama University
2017	Youth Icon Award	Trikona Awards	For exemplary work for the betterment of society and motivating Youth
2016	Youth Icon Award	Take Care India	Association with DR.APJ - Abdul Kalam International Foundation
2015	Best Actor	V4 Award	Film Nedunchaalai
2014	Best Actor	Films Fans Association 62nd Annual Award	Film - Nedunchaalai

Preceded by Mugen Rao	Bigg Boss Tamil Winner (Series 4) 2020-2021	Succeeded by Raju Jeyamohan
