= Kombu Vatcha Singamda =

2022 Indian film

- Theatrical release poster
- Directed by: S. R. Prabhakaran
- Written by: S. R. Prabhakaran
- Produced by: Inder Kumar
- Starring: M. Sasikumar; Madonna Sebastian
- Cinematography: N. K. Ekambaram
- Edited by: V. Don Bosco
- Music by: Dhibu Ninan Thomas
- Production companies: Redhan The Cinema People; Pangajam Dreams Productions
- Distributed by: Green Colour Creations
- Release date: 13 January 2022
- Running time: 145 minutes
- Country: India
- Language: Tamil

Kombu Vatcha Singamda (transl. The Lion with Horns) is a 2022 Indian Tamil-language action drama film written and directed by S.R. Prabhakaran and produced by Redhan The Cinema People. The film stars M. Sasikumar and Madonna Sebastian with a supporting cast including Soori, Mahendran, Hareesh Peradi and Inder Kumar. The film's music and score is composed by Dhibu Ninan Thomas, with cinematography handled by N. K. Ekambaram and editing done by V. Don Bosco. The film released in theatres on 13 January 2022. The film received mixed reviews.

== Plot ==
Thaman (M. Sasikumar), son of Deivendran (Mahendran), falls in love with Thamizhselvi (Madonna Sebastian), daughter of Vellappan (Hareesh Peradi), another big shot in the town. Though Thaman and Vellappan belong to the same sect, they don't get along well as Vellappan is established a castiest with a discriminatory attitude. This irks Thaman and his friends who often end up locking horns with him. Within a few minutes, we witness a local body election eventually affecting everyone's lives. Thaman and his friends themselves decide to split into two groups to support two parties in local body elections for personal reasons. However, little do they know that this decision of theirs would cause a crack in their friendship. Two of their friends lose their lives in this war.

== Cast ==
- M. Sasikumar as Thaman
- Madonna Sebastian as Thamizhselvi
- Soori as Karthik
- Mahendran as Deivendran
- Hareesh Peradi as Vellappan
- Inder Kumar
- Sri Priyanka as Ragini
- Dheepa Ramanujam
- Kulappulli Leela as Ragini's grandmother
- Sathyapriya
- Aruldoss
- Sangili Murugan
- Gajaraj
- Hello Kandasamy
- Sendrayan as Thamizhselvi's lover
- Mu Ramaswamy as Village head
- Thamizhkumaran
- Ragaash
- Galatta Guru
- Raghav Vijay
- Abi Saravanan as Thaman's friend
- Santhosh Krishnan
- Logu
- Munnar Ramesh as Goon
- Nagavishal
- Samuthirakani as an Eelam fighter (Special appearance)
- Manikandan eruthempathy as college student

== Production ==
The film marked M. Sasikumar's second collaboration with S. R. Prabhakaran after Sundarapandian (2012). The cast was finalized with Madonna Sebastian playing the female lead opposite Sasikumar. The principal photography began with a pooja ceremony on 13 October 2020. The film was shot in Karaikudi, Coimbatore, Pollachi, Palani, Tenkasi, Kovilpatti, Virudhunagar and Madurai cities and was wrapped up in a single schedule in May 2021.

== Soundtrack ==
The soundtrack and score are composed by Dhibu Ninan Thomas.

Kombu Vatcha Singamda

Soundtrack album by Dhibu Ninan Thomas
- Released: 2022
- Genre: Feature film soundtrack
- Length: 17:03
- Language: Tamil
- Label: Muzik247
- Producer: Dhibu Ninan Thomas

Dhibu Ninan Thomas chronology
Bachelor (2021)	Kombu Vatcha Singamda (2022)	Nenjuku Needhi (2022)

Track listing
No.	Title	Lyrics	Singer(s)	Length
1.	"Pesatha Mozhiye"	Arunraja Kamaraj	Chinmayi, K. S. Harisankar	4:30
2.	"Thamizh Sondhamae"	Yugabharathi	Kapil Kapilan	4:18
3.	"Arkali"	GKB	Sathya Prakash, Ala B Bala	4:04
4.	"Chinna Raasa"	GKB	Kapil Kapilan	4:11
Total length:				16:63

== Release ==
The trailer of the film was released in September 2021. The film released in theatres on 13 January 2022.

=== Home media ===
The Satellite Rights bagged by Sun TV. The streaming rights acquired by Sun NXT and Netflix.

== Reception ==
The film released worldwide 13 January 2022. Logesh Balachandran critic of Times of India gave 2.5 stars out of 5 stars and noted that "The twist in the climax sequence and the veteran director's performance is one of the highlights of this movie." Cinema Express critic Avinash Ramachandran said "Kombu Vatcha Singamda is definitely no Pariyerum Perumal or Karnan or Kaala, but it is definitely a couple of rungs higher than Sundarapandian, and it just goes on to show that the long write-ups, the deep analysis, and well-intentioned criticisms are reaching the right places, and the change is happening. Slowly but steadily." and gave 2.5 stars out of 5 stars. Maalai Malar critic noted that "SR Prabhakaran has directed the film. He has directed the film with the features of a commercial film. But, it did not attract the fans in a big way."
