= Fourth Floor (film) =

2026 Tamil psychological thriller film

- Theatrical release poster
- Directed by: L. R. Sundarapandi
- Written by: L. R. Sundarapandi
- Produced by: A. Raja
- Starring: Aari Arujunan; Deepshika; Pavithra
- Cinematography: J.Laxman MFI
- Edited by: Sudharshan
- Music by: Dharan Kumar
- Production company: Mano Creation
- Release date: 27 February 2026
- Country: India
- Language: Tamil

Fourth Floor is a 2026 Indian Tamil-language psychological horror thriller film written and directed by L. R. Sundarapandi, starring Aari Arujunan and Deepshika in the lead roles, alongside Pavithra, Subramaniam Siva, Thalaivasal Vijay and others in important roles. The film is produced by A. Raja under his Mano Creation banner, while the technical team consist of music composer Dharan Kumar, editor Sudharshan and cinematographer J. Laxman MFI.

Fourth Floor was released in theatres on 27 February 2026.

== Cast ==
- Aari Arujunan as Dheeran
- Deepshika as Swetha
- Pavithra as Anu
- Subramaniam Siva as Viswam
- Thalaivasal Vijay as Krishnamoorthy
- Adithya Kathir as Sathish
- Baby Srivarshini as Sara

== Production ==
In mid-February 2025, Aari Arujunan who last appeared in Ellaam Mela Irukuravan Paathuppan (2023) was announced to collaborate with director L. R. Sundarapandi for his next titled Fourth Floor, produced by A. Raja under his Mano Creation banner. Set in Chennai, the entire filming took place in Chennai and its surrounding areas. The film is produced by A. Raja under his Mano Creation banner, while the technical team consists of music composer Dharan Kumar, editor Sudharshan and cinematographer J. Laxman MFI. The film stars Deepshika in the lead role opposite to Aari, alongside Pavithra, Subramaniam Siva, Thalaivasal Vijay and others in important roles.

== Release ==
Fourth Floor was released in theatres on 27 February 2026.
