= Kanaa (film) =

2018 film directed by Arunraja Kamaraj

- Theatrical release poster
- Directed by: Arunraja Kamaraj
- Written by: Arunraja Kamaraj
- Produced by: Sivakarthikeyan
- Starring: Sathyaraj; Aishwarya Rajesh; Darshan
- Cinematography: Dinesh B. Krishnan
- Edited by: Ruben
- Music by: Dhibu Ninan Thomas
- Production company: Sivakarthikeyan Productions
- Release date: 21 December 2018
- Running time: 145 minutes
- Country: India
- Language: Tamil

Kanaa (transl. To dream) is a 2018 Indian Tamil-language sports drama film starring Sathyaraj, Aishwarya Rajesh and Darshan in the lead roles while Sivakarthikeyan appears in an extended cameo appearance. The film is written and directed by Arunraja Kamaraj, in his directorial debut. It was released theatrically on 21 December 2018. The film has music composed by Dhibu Ninan Thomas, cinematography by Dinesh B. Krishnan, editing by Ruben and production by Sivakarthikeyan under his newly established Sivakarthikeyan Productions banner. It was remade in Telugu as Kousalya Krishnamurthy, with Aishwarya Rajesh reprising her role and Sivakarthikeyan and the cricket team's footage reused.

== Plot ==
Kousalya Murugesan aka Kowsi is the daughter of Murugesan, a farmer in Kulithalai, Karur. She aspires to become an international cricketer and help India win the 2007 Cricket World Cup, inspired by her father's heartbreak when India suffers a crushing defeat to Sri Lanka and is eliminated from the tournament. After witnessing Murugesan secretly crying over the loss, 11-year-old Kowsi resolves to play cricket seriously and one day win the World Cup for him.

At 14, Kowsi joins her village cricket team, mostly comprising her school seniors. Her off-spin bowling earns her wickets and recognition, although some villagers disapprove of her playing cricket with boys in t-shirts and trousers. Murugesan supports her regardless. Kowsi initially fails the Tamil Nadu team selection test but succeeds on her second attempt and begins playing for the Tamil Nadu women's team. Her efforts eventually earn her selection for the Indian women's cricket team, after which she travels to Bangalore for training at a national cricket academy.

Meanwhile, Murugesan struggles to repay a bank debt of Rs. 4 lakhs, leading to conflict with the bank manager. At the academy, Kowsi is mistreated by senior players because she cannot speak Hindi, while the coach repeatedly demotivates her. After the coach retires, former Indian cricketer Nelson Dilipkumar becomes the new coach. Nelson had been forced to retire after his first international match because of a severe eye injury that left him partially blind in his left eye. He rebuilds the team's spirit ahead of the T20 World Cup, recognises Kowsi's potential as a spin bowler and fights the selection committee to include her in the World Cup squad.

Nelson initially rests Kowsi during the league matches, upsetting her, but explains that he is concealing her abilities from opponents so that her bowling will surprise them in the semifinals. Kowsi is selected for the semifinal against the strongest team, Australia. On the same day, Murugesan's house is seized by the bank manager because of his unpaid debt. Upset that she cannot be with her father, Kowsi is encouraged by Nelson to make him proud by performing well.

During the match, Kowsi takes a hat-trick and hits a six while batting, resulting in a tie. In the super over, she again bowls effectively, securing India's victory. She receives Rs. 5 lakhs as the "Woman of the Match" and delivers an emotional speech about her father's struggles and those of farmers across the country. Murugesan proudly watches her achievement. The closing credits reveal that the Indian women's team wins the T20 final against the West Indies women's team, while Kowsi is honoured by the Tamil Nadu government for her bowling tactics.

== Cast ==
Source (Note: Sivakarthikeyan's name is noticeably missing from the film's opening credits but is present as a producer and in the end credits.)

- Sathyaraj as Murugesan
- Sivakarthikeyan as Nelson Dhilipkumar
- Aishwarya Rajesh as Kousalya Murugesan
  - Keerthika as Young Kousalya
  - Baby Monika as Young Kousalya
- Darshan as Murali Krishna
- Rama as Savithri, Kousalya's mother
- Ilavarasu as Thangarasu
- Ramdoss as Inspector Patchamuthu
- Kali Prasad Mukherjee as Patel
- Namo Narayana as Politician
- Balaji Venugopal as Bank Manager
- Blade Shankar as School P. T. Master
- Hello Kandasamy as Kandasamy
- Seenu Vasan as Old Bank Manager
- Sethupathy as Loan Officer
- Savari Muthu as Sachin
- Antony Bhagyaraj as Tendulkar
- Ashok Kumar as Anand
- Keneesha Francis as reporter
- Guna as Peter
- Sathya NJ as Sathya
- Aruvi Balaji as Nambi
- Pradeep Durairaj as Sekar
- Sivamaaran as Prakash
- Ajith Koshy

=== Cricket team ===
- Sushree Pradhan as Deepika Patel
- Nirali Oza as Gayathri Dixit
- Shyla Alam as Anjali Sharma
- Natasha Parashar as Natasha Parashar
- Ramya Suresh as Ramya
- Sajana Sajeevan as Sajana

Ramya, Prathibha, Shraddha Saxena, Rujula, Nanditha Das, Asmita Thakkar, Yashashwani, Manju Godara, Rajitha, Amirtha, Smirthi, Anu Durga, Sowmiya, Nivetha and Nivashini play other members of the cricket team.

== Production ==
One day Sivakarthikeyan asked me if I knew how to play cricket. I told him that I didn’t know anything about cricket. I came to know that he is making a film with Arunraja Kamaraj on women’s cricket. I was honest as my concern was that they were doing it on a budget. In fact, I was asking my friends in the industry if they knew cricket. And the real cricket players were not ready to come on board. I thought why not I gave it a try and asked Arunraj if I could hear the story. He felt it would be a waste of time narrating the script to someone who does not know anything about cricket. Somehow, I persuaded him and made him narrate the full story. I loved hearing about a sports-based subject for the first time. I asked him for seven days and soon our journey of Kanaa started. He was convinced.

— Aishwarya Rajesh on how the film developed

This project was officially launched in February 2018, and actor Sivakarthikeyan is making his debut as the producer of the venture, under his newly established SK Productions banner, with actors Aishwarya Rajesh and Sathyaraj joining the cast, and debut actor Darshan was signed to play the male lead role. Dhibu Ninan Thomas, who earlier composed for Maragadha Naanayam (2017) was selected as the music director. Meanwhile, Dinesh Krishnan, Ruben, and Lalgudi N Ilayaraja were signed as a cinematographer, editor and art director for this film. This film is shot in Tiruchirapalli (Trichy, Lalgudi, Kulithalai), etc. Sivakarthikeyan's character was named Nelson Dilipkumar because Nelson Dilipkumar helped Arunraja Kamaraj during the initial stages of his career.

== Soundtrack ==
Kanaa

Soundtrack album by Dhibu Ninan Thomas
- Released: 2018
- Recorded: 2018
- Genre: Feature film soundtrack
- Length: 21:03
- Label: Sony Music India
- Producer: Dhibu Ninan Thomas

Dhibu Ninan Thomas chronology
Zacharia Pothen Jeevichirippundu (2017)	Kanaa (2018)	Kousalya Krishnamurthy (2019)

The film's soundtrack is composed by Dhibu Ninan Thomas, who happens to be classmates with Sivakarthikeyan and Arunraja Kamaraj on their college days. The album features five songs, of which the song "Vaayadi Petha Pulla" is sung by Sivakarthikeyan and his daughter Aaradhana, alongside Vaikom Vijayalakshmi as well. The audio rights of the film are secured by Sony Music India.

Track listing
No.	Title	Lyrics	Singer(s)	Length
1.	"Vaayadi Petha Pulla"	GKB	Aaradhana Sivakarthikeyan, Vaikom Vijayalakshmi, Sivakarthikeyan	4:07
2.	"Oonjala Oonjala"	Mohan Rajan	Niranjana Ramanan, Sid Sriram	4:12
3.	"Kanne En Kannazhage"	Arunraja Kamaraj	Kapil Kapilan	4:40
4.	"Othaiyadi Pathayila"	Arunraja Kamaraj	Anirudh Ravichander	4:09
5.	"Savaal"	Mohan Rajan, Rabbit Mac	Dhibu Ninan Thomas, Rabbit Mac, Arunraja Kamaraj	3:53
Total length:				21:03

== Release and reception ==
The film was released on 21 December 2018. M Suganth from Times of India calls the movie a "crowd-pleasing sports movie that also doubles up as a message movie on farmers and their issues", giving the film a 3.5/5 rating.

== Awards and nominations ==
Date of ceremony	Award	Category	Recipient(s) and nominee(s)	Result	Ref.
25-28 April 2019	Norway Tamil Film Festival Awards	Best Production	Sivakarthikeyan Productions	Won	
25-28 April 2019	Norway Tamil Film Festival Awards	Best Social Awareness Award	Arunraja Kamaraj	Won	
2019	JFW Movie Awards	Special Recognition for Young Talent	Aaradhana Sivakarthikeyan	Won	
2019	JFW Movie Awards	Best Actress - Critic	Aishwarya Rajesh	Won	
2019	JFW Movie Awards	Best Child Artist	Keerthika	Nominated	
2019	JFW Movie Awards	Best Director of Women-Centric Film	Arunraja Kamaraj	Won	
2019	JFW Movie Awards	Best Women-Centric Film	Sivakarthikeyan Productions	Won	
2019	JFW Movie Awards	Best Actress in a Lead Role	Aishwarya Rajesh	Nominated	
15-16 August 2019	8th South Indian International Movie Awards	Best Actress – Tamil	Aishwarya Rajesh	Nominated	
15-16 August 2019	8th South Indian International Movie Awards	Best Actor in a Supporting Role - Tamil	Sathyaraj	Nominated	
15-16 August 2019	8th South Indian International Movie Awards	Best Debut Actor - Tamil	Darshan	Nominated	
15-16 August 2019	8th South Indian International Movie Awards	Best Debut Director - Tamil	Arunraja Kamaraj	Nominated	
15-16 August 2019	8th South Indian International Movie Awards	Critics Best Actress – Tamil	Aishwarya Rajesh	Won	
21 December 2019	66th Filmfare Awards South	Best Supporting Actor	Sathyaraj	Won	
21 December 2019	66th Filmfare Awards South	Best Actress	Aishwarya Rajesh	Nominated	
21 December 2019	66th Filmfare Awards South	Critics Best Actress – Tamil	Aishwarya Rajesh	Won	
21 December 2019	66th Filmfare Awards South	Best Lyricist	GKB	Nominated	
4 January 2020	Zee Cine Awards Tamil	Best Debut Director	Arunraja Kamaraj	Won	
4 January 2020	Zee Cine Awards Tamil	Best Actress	Aishwarya Rajesh	Won	
29 January 2026	Tamil Nadu State Film Awards	Best Film About Women Empowerment (Special Prize)	Sivakarthikeyan Productions	Won	
29 January 2026	Tamil Nadu State Film Awards	Best Actress (Special Prize)	Aishwarya Rajesh	Won	
29 January 2026	Tamil Nadu State Film Awards	Best Playback Singer (Female)	Aaradhana Sivakarthikeyan	Won	
