= Dhibu Ninan Thomas =

Indian film music composer

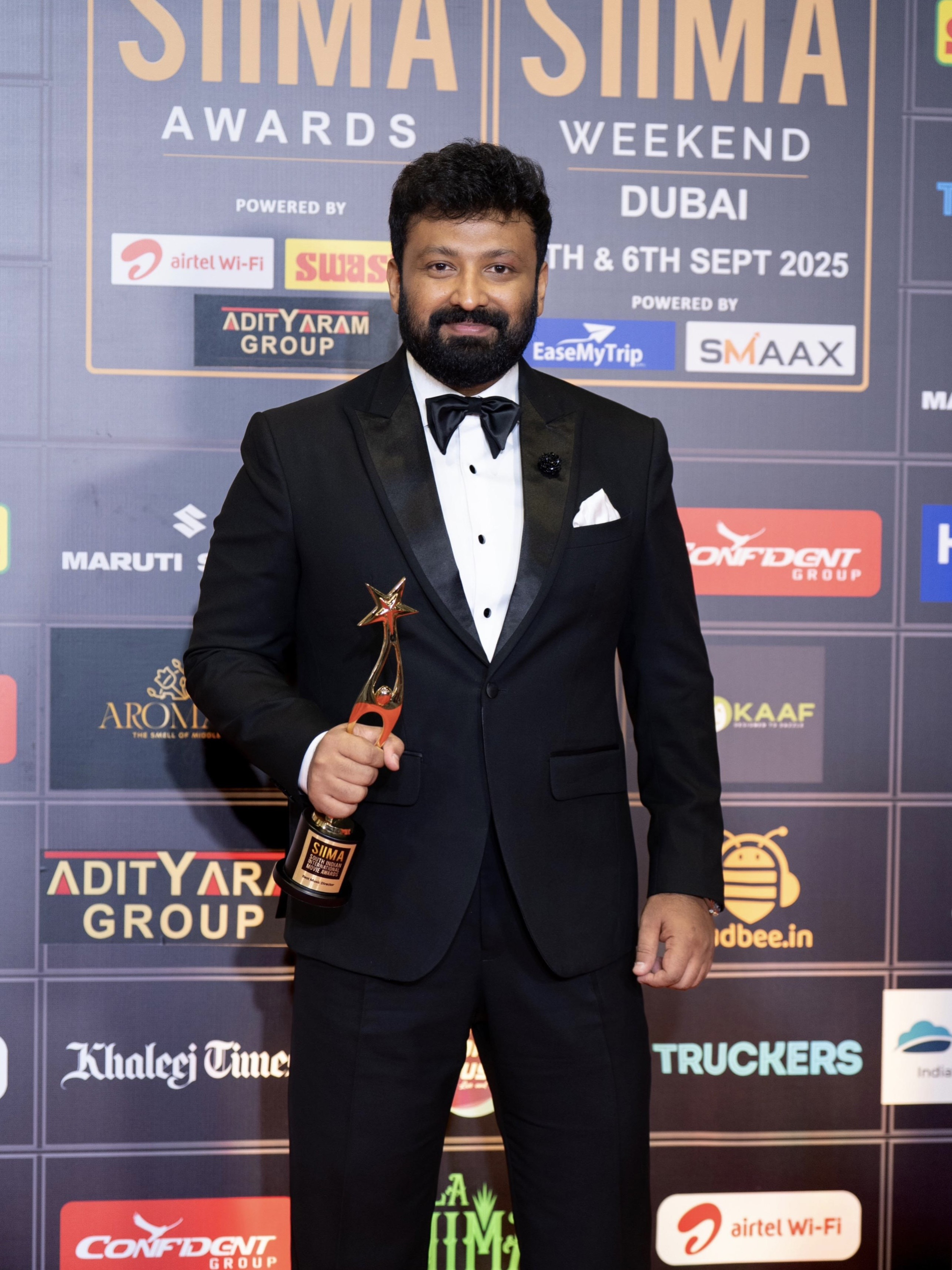
- Dhibu Ninan Thomas at SIIMA Awards 2025

Background information
- Born: Dhibu Ninan Thomas
- Genres: Film Score, Film Music
- Occupations: Film Music Composer; Singer; Arranger; Instrumentalist
- Instruments: Piano, Vocals, Percussions
- Years active: 2017–present
- Labels: Think Music India; Sony Music India

Dhibu Ninan Thomas is an Indian music composer who predominantly works in Tamil and Malayalam cinema.

== Early life ==
Dhibu was born in a Malayali family from Kottayam, Kerala. He did his bachelor of engineering in electronics from JJ Engineering College in Trichy.

Dhibu was a music enthusiast from childhood. He was actively involved in music and participated in opportunities for it. Actor Sivakarthikeyan and actor-director Arunraja Kamaraj were his college mates.

== Career ==
Thomas made his music director debut in 2017 with Maragadha Naanayam. He then composed music for the 2018 film Kanaa, which was produced by Sivakarthikeyan and directed by Arunraja Kamaraj in their maiden films as producer and director, respectively. Following Kanaa, he composed the music for its Telugu remake, Kousalya Krishnamurthy (2019).

== Discography ==
=== As a composer ===
Year	Title	Language	Notes	Ref.
2017	Maragadha Naanayam	Tamil	Marakathamani (Telugu)	
2017	Zacharia Pothen Jeevichirippundu	Malayalam		
2018	Kanaa	Tamil		
2019	Kousalya Krishnamurthy	Telugu	Telugu remake of Kanaa	
2021	Bachelor	Tamil	composed only one song "Adiye"	
2022	Kombu Vatcha Singamda	Tamil		
2022	Nenjuku Needhi	Tamil	Tamil remake of Article 15	
2022	Nadhi	Tamil		
2023	Chithha	Tamil	Composed "Kangal Edho", "Theera Swasame" and "Show me the way"	
2024	Ajayante Randam Moshanam	Malayalam		
2025	Diesel	Tamil		
2026	Mr. X	Tamil		
Upcoming	Irandu Vaanam	Tamil		

=== As singer ===
Year	Song	Co singer(s)	Film	Music Director/Composer
2018	"Savaal"	Rabbit Mac, Arunraja Kamaraj	Kanaa	Dhibu Ninan Thomas
2024	"Kooriruttilu Kaalkulambadi"	Charu Hariharan	Ajayante Randam Moshanam	Dhibu Ninan Thomas
