= Nenjuku Needhi =

2022 film directed by Arunraja Kamaraj

- Theatrical release poster
- Directed by: Arunraja Kamaraj
- Screenplay by: Arunraja Kamaraj
- Dialogues by: Tamizharasan Pachamuthu
- Based on: Article 15 by Anubhav Sinha
- Produced by: Boney Kapoor
- Starring: Udhayanidhi Stalin; Aari Arujunan; Tanya Ravichandran; Shivani Rajashekar
- Cinematography: Dinesh B. Krishnan
- Edited by: Ruben
- Music by: Dhibu Ninan Thomas
- Production companies: Zee Studios; Bayview Projects; Romeo Pictures
- Distributed by: Red Giant Movies
- Release date: 20 May 2022
- Running time: 132 minutes
- Country: India
- Language: Tamil

Nenjuku Needhi (transl. Justice for the Heart) is a 2022 Indian Tamil-language political drama film directed by Arunraja Kamaraj and produced by Boney Kapoor. A remake of the 2019 Hindi film Article 15, it stars Udhayanidhi Stalin, Aari Arujunan, Tanya Ravichandran, and Shivani Rajashekar. The film revolves around an upright police officer launching an attack against the caste system after caste-based discrimination and other crimes are dismissed.

Principal photography began in April 2021 and wrapped that December. Nenjuku Needhi was released theatrically on 20 May 2022, and received positive reviews, with praise for Udhayanidhi's performance and story. The film completed 50 days of its theatrical run.

== Plot ==
Vijaya Raghavan, an IPS officer, gets posted in a rural part of Tamil Nadu, where caste discrimination and untouchability are still in practice. Though Vijaya Raghavan has read about discrimination in many books, it gets difficult for him to confront these problems in real life. While he is still grappling with the ideologies of the people around him and trying to educate them, a mysterious case of three missing Dalit girls, who were employed in the local factory, makes his life more miserable. Two are found dead, but the case gets complicated, as there is no trace of the third one. Who is behind this heinous crime, and how Vijaya Raghavan takes this case forward despite pressure from his casteist higher officials forms the rest of the plot.

== Cast ==
- Udhayanidhi Stalin as S. Vijaya Raghavan IPS
- Aari Arujunan as Kumaran
- Tanya Ravichandran as Adhithi Vijayaraghvan
- Shivani Rajashekar as Kurinji
- Suresh Chakravarthy as Circle Inspector Sundaram
- Ilavarasu as Sub-Inspector Malaichami(SC)
- Mayilsamy as V. Villalan
- Ramesh Thilak as Venkat
- Sayaji Shinde as CBI Officer
- Pasupathi Raj as Moorthy
- Raahul as Gunasekaran
- Abdool Lee as Vasan SV
- Ratsasan Saravanan as Nataraj
- Yamini Chander as Dr. Anitha
- Hello Kandasamy as Devendran
- Jeeva Ravi as Superintendent of Police
- Ravi Venkatraman as Kesavan, retired SP
- Ashvin Raja as Mechanic Suresh
- Aruvi Bala as Balaji
- Venkat Subha as Party Leader
- Merku Thodarchi Malai Antony as Ravi
- Suhasini Sanjeev as Valli
- Ranganathan as Minister
- S. Saranya Sri as Sathya
- S. Thirukkurali as Suganthi
- B. Harshika Shree as Jaya
- Manikandan as Kailash

== Production ==
In September 2019, it was announced that Boney Kapoor had purchased the Tamil remake rights of the 2019 Hindi film Article 15. In August 2020, Kapoor confirmed that the remake was in development. It is Arunraja Kamaraj's second film as director after Kanaa (2019). Udhayanidhi Stalin was chosen to play the lead role originally done by Ayushman Khurrana; the director said Udhayanidhi's political background had nothing to do with his casting. Principal photography began in April 2021 in Pollachi. A week after filming began, Aari Arujunan joined the cast. The title Nenjuku Needhi, named after the autobiography of Udhayanidhi's grandfather M. Karunanidhi, was announced on 16 October 2021. Principal photography wrapped in mid-December.

== Music ==
The film's music is composed by Dhibu Ninan Thomas.

Nenjuku Needhi

Soundtrack album by Dhibu Ninan Thomas
- Released: 2022
- Genre: Feature film soundtrack
- Length: 9:04
- Language: Tamil
- Label: Zee Music South
- Producer: Dhibu Ninan Thomas

Dhibu Ninan Thomas chronology
Kombu Vatcha Singamda (2022)	Nenjuku Needhi (2022)	Nadhi (2022)

Track listing
No.	Title	Lyrics	Singer(s)	Length
1.	"Sevakkaattu Seemaiellaam"	Yugabharathi	Guru Ayyadurai	4:14
2.	"Nenjukku Needhi" (Title Track)	–	Arunraja Kamaraj	0:40
3.	"Engey Needhi"	Yugabharathi	Ananya Bhat, Kalyani Nair, Anjana Rajagopalan, Devu Mathew, Sinduri S, Shobi Ashika.C, Shilvi Sharon	4:50
Total length:				9:04

== Release ==
=== Theatrical ===
Nenjuku Needhi was released worldwide on 20 May 2022. The film's distribution rights in Tamil Nadu are held by Red Giant Movies. It was originally scheduled to release in early March 2022, but then delayed to avoid clash with other films like Etharkkum Thunindhavan and Radhe Shyam.

=== Home media ===
Nenjuku Needhi began streaming on SonyLIV from 23 June 2022. The film had its television premiere via Kalaignar TV on 15 August, Indian Independence Day.

== Reception ==
The Times of India gave a rating of 3.5 out of 5 and wrote, "A deeply-affecting and powerful film on caste disparities and inequality". Puthiya Thalaimurai felt the film would win because it spoke a lot of hard-hitting facts throughout. ABP Nadu wrote the filmmakers criticised the caste that politicians see and those who make a living by doing politics on the basis of caste; Udhayanidhi could be praised for that. Ananda Vikatan wrote that the film speaks of the pain of the oppressed, the guiltless power of the dominant forces, and the role that all of society has in the tyranny of untouchability. The New Indian Express gave 3.5 out of 5 stars and wrote "A heartfelt exploration of an important problem". The Hindu wrote "The remake is well-adapted to suit the social milieu of Tamil Nadu, but doesn't quite immerse you into its world like its original". The News Minute wrote, "Much like the Bollywood original, Nenjuku Needhi turns oppression into spectacle and denies dignity to the very people it claims to represent".

Ashameera Aiyappan from Firstpost gave 3 out of 5 rating and stated, "Udhayanidhi's presence makes these additions more significant -- the actor's political lineage and career are no secret. But there's also no denying that they are well-done. Udhayanidhi's involvement means we have a few shots of him against the rising sun. But thankfully, the film doesn't indulge in them too much. Udhayanidhi gives an earnest performance and is well-aided by the ensemble of excellent supporting actors." Aditya Shrikrishna form Mint noted that 'As much as Nenjukku Needhi is well-intentioned, it could have done with embellishments providing cultural and temporal context". Maalai Malar lauded the cast performances, direction, screenplay and background score. Dinamalar gave 3 out of 5 stars, appreciating the background score and cinematography but felt the film was slow paced, and was mildly critical of the screenplay.
