= Divyabharathi =

Indian actress

- Born: 28 January 1992 (age 34); Coimbatore, Tamil Nadu, India
- Education: Bannari Amman Institute of Technology
- Occupations: Actress; Model
- Years active: 2017–present

Divyabharathi (born 28 January 1992) is an Indian actress, who works in Tamil films. She was a professional model, later got into acting and rose to fame with her debut film Bachelor.

She garnered notice for her role in the film, winning several accolades in her debut film itself and won Woman Entertainer of the year for 2021. She also was won Miss Ethnic Face of Madras, Princess of Coimbatore 2016, and Popular New Face Model in the fields of modelling and advertising. She won the Female Rising Star of Kollywood in 2022.

== Early life and education ==
Divyabharathi was born in Coimbatore, Tamil Nadu. She completed her school education in Coimbatore and pursued her engineering degree in B.Tech. Information Technology in Bannari Amman Institute of Technology, Sathyamangalam. After completing her education, she started modelling for fashion shows and designer events. She also started acting in ad films, modelling photoshoots and Television commercials. She made fortunes in modelling and emerged as the winner of Miss Ethnic Face of Madras in 2015. In the same year, Divya Bharathi was also crowned as the Popular New Face Model. She continued her stint in the modelling career and pursued the title Princess of Coimbatore 2016. After seeeing success in the modelling field, she finally decided to pursue acting as a full-time profession.

== Career ==
Before entering into Tamil film industry, she was a model and won the Miss Ethnic Face of Madras in 2015 and Popular New Face Model in the same year. In 2016, she bagged the title 'Princess of Coimbatore 2016'.

Divyabharathi got various offers in modelling and started appearing in many television advertisements. She finally landed up in the lead role by auditioning for the feature film Bachelor film co starring G. V. Prakash Kumar and underwent workshop sessions to transform from acting in ads to acting in full-length feature films. The film was finally started in September 2019 with her playing the protagonist in this heroine centric film with G. V. Prakash Kumar as the main antagonist. The film was produced by Axess Film Factory. After being under production for 2 years it was finally released on 3 December 2021. It was initially met with mixed reviews, but her performance in the film as Subbu garnered huge attention and appreciation for her bold portrayal, and carrying the entire film on her shoulders. Her performance was widely regarded as one of the best performances by a debut actress. She was appreciated that it did not appear as her debut film, but she performed like an experienced actress. She was also awarded the Rising Star Female in Edison Awards 2022. Her performance in the character Subbulakshmi was heavily praised as she carried the whole film as a protagonist in her debut film itself and she won several awards for the same.

She acted in Madhil Mel Kaadhal paired up with Mugen Rao directed by Anjana Ali Khan but the movie remain unreleased. In October 2023, she was announced to appear in the 25th film of G. V. Prakash Kumar titled Kingston making her second collaboration with him after Bachelor (2021).

In 2024, she appeared in the webseries called Cheran's Journey (2024) alongside veteran actor R. Sarathkumar, Prasanna, Kalaiyarasan which was directed by Cheran, released in OTT Platform, SonyLIV. and also made cameo appearance in Maharaja (2024) as Maharaja's wife which emerged to be one of the highest-grossing Tamil film of 2024.

In the same year, she debuted in a Telugu movie G.O.A.T alongside Sudigali Sudheer which is yet to be released. On 19 November 2025, through her social media handle, she accused her G.O.A.T film director Naresh Kuppili of misogynistic behaviour during the time of production of the film, for using derogatory slang terms and also questioned the silence of her co-star in the film Sudigali Sudheer for not intervening. Earlier, Naresh was removed from the project was due to internal differences, and the producer himself took over the direction duties.

== Filmography ==
=== Films ===
- Note: all films are in Tamil, unless otherwise noted.

Key
†	Denotes films that have not yet been released

List of Divyabharathi film credits
Year	Title	Role	Notes
2017	Mupparimanam	Anusha's friend	
2021	Bachelor	Subbulakshmi "Subbu"	Lead debut
2024	Maharaja	Maharaja's wife	
2025	Kingston	Rose	
TBA	Aasai †	TBA	Completed
TBA	G.O.A.T †	TBA	Telugu film
TBA	Madhil Mel Kaadhal †	TBA	Filming

=== Web Series ===
Year	Title	Role	Platform	Note
2024	Cheran's Journey	Latha Vijayakumar Reddy	SonyLIV	
2026	Lingam	Ponmalar a.k.a. "Malar"	Disney+ Hotstar	

== Awards and nominations ==
Year	Award	Category	Film	Result	Ref.
2022	Edison Awards	Best Female Rising Star	Bachelor	Won	
2022	Techofes Awards	Best Debut Actress	Bachelor	Won	
2022	Radio City Awards	Woman Entertainer of the year - Cinema	Bachelor	Won	
2022	Behindwoods Gold Medals	Best Debut Actor - Female	Bachelor	Won	
2022	She India Awards	Sensational Star of the year	Bachelor	Won	

== See also ==
- List of Indian film actresses
- List of Tamil film actresses
