= Inst =

Inst may refer to:

- As "inst.", abbreviation for instant, with reference to time
- Alternative shortened Instagram name
- As "inst.", abbreviation for instante mense, meaning a date of the current month, such as "the 5th inst."
- The Royal Belfast Academical Institution, a grammar school in Belfast, Northern Ireland
- The Institute of Nano Science and Technology in India
- Tuskegee University, Alabama, United States
- Bannari Amman Institute of Technology, Tamil Nadu, India
- Instrumental, with reference to music
