= Kousalya Krishnamurthy =

Sports drama film directed by Bhimaneni Srinivasa Rao

- Theatrical release poster
- Directed by: Bhimaneni Srinivasa Rao
- Screenplay by: Bhimaneni Srinivasa Rao
- Story by: Arunraja Kamaraj
- Produced by: K. A. Vallabha
- Starring: Aishwarya Rajesh; Rajendra Prasad; Karthik Raju
- Cinematography: I. Andrew
- Edited by: Kotagiri Venkateswara Rao
- Music by: Dhibu Ninan Thomas
- Production company: Creative Commercials
- Release date: 23 August 2019
- Running time: 149 mins
- Country: India
- Language: Telugu

Kousalya Krishnamurthy is a 2019 Indian Telugu-language sports drama film, produced by K. A. Vallabha under the Creative Commercials banner and directed by Bhimaneni Srinivasa Rao. The film stars Aishwarya Rajesh, Rajendra Prasad, and Karthik Raju with Sivakarthikeyan in a supporting role, with music composed by Dhibu Ninan Thomas. This film is a remake of the 2018 Tamil film Kanaa and marks the Telugu debut of Aishwarya Rajesh. The film reused scenes involving Sivakarthikeyan and the cricket team from the original film. The film was released theatrically on 23 August 2019.

== Plot ==
The film begins in a village where Kousalya, the daughter of Krishnamurthy, a farmer, is highly fascinated by cricket. In her childhood, Kousalya saw tears in her father's eyes when India suffered defeat in the 2007 Cricket World Cup. Hence, she determines to become an international cricketer to get back the smile on her cricket-loving father's face. At the age of 11, she joins the local cricket team in the village, who are mostly her school seniors, when everyone appreciates her talent for off-spin technique getting wickets. She also earns the wrath of many villagers for playing cricket with boys, which Krishna Murthy does not care about and supports his daughter. At present, Kousalya appears for team selections. She gets rejected but does not give up. She works hard and gets selected for the Indian women's cricket team. Kousalya moves for training at National Cricket Academy Bangalore, where she is humiliated by seniors due to internal politics, and even the coach demotes her to a large extent. However, the entry of a new coach named Nelson Dilipkumar, an ex-Indian cricketer, develops the team's spirit and gets the players ready for the upcoming T20 World Cup. Nelson discovers the spin bowling capabilities of Kousalya and trains her on the right path. He also locks horns with the committee and ensures Kousalya's presence in the World Cup. Meanwhile, Krishnamurthy faces a tough time with agriculture and is unable to repay the debt of the bank and ends up being in a rift with the bank manager. At one point, Nelson decides to rest Kousalya for the league matches as a strategy to hide her talent and give a surprise to opponents, which brings her down. Ultimately, Kousalya is selected for the semifinal against the strongest team, Australia. At the same time, Krishnamurthy's house is auctioned by the bank; hearing it, Kousalya becomes anguished when Nelson motivates her to make her father proud by winning the match. During the match, Kousalya bowls a hat-trick and again bowls well, leading to India's win. At last, she is declared as the Woman of the Match, awarded Rs. 5 lakhs from the same bank that is auctioning her house when she gives an emotional speech describing the situation of farmers in the country. Finally, Krishna Murthy feels proud of his daughter.

== Cast ==
- Aishwarya Rajesh as Kousalya Krishnamurthy
- Rajendra Prasad as Krishnamurthy
- Karthik Raju as Sai
- Sivakarthikeyan as Nelson Dhilipkumar (voice dubbed by Vasu)
- Jhansi as Savitri, Kousalya's mother
- Vennela Kishore as Inspector Balram
- Bhimaneni Srinivasa Rao as Bank manager
- Ravi Prakash as School P. T. Master
- C. V. L. Narasimha Rao as Dhanakrishna
- "Rangasthalam" Mahesh as Sachin
- Vishnu Oi as Tendulkar

== Production ==
K. S. Rama Rao, the presenter of the film, saw the trailer of Kanaa on the sets of World Famous Lover and decided to remake it in Telugu.

Filming took place nearRajahmundry.

== Soundtrack ==
Kousalya Krishnamurthy

Soundtrack album by Dhibu Ninan Thomas
- Released: 22 June 2019
- Recorded: 2019
- Genre: Feature film soundtrack
- Length: 21:16
- Label: Sony Music India
- Producer: Dhibu Ninan Thomas

Dhibu Ninan Thomas chronology
Kanaa (2018)	Kousalya Krishnamurthy (2019)	Bachelor (2021)
External audio
- Audio Jukebox on YouTube

The film's soundtrack was composed by Dhibu Ninan Thomas, who composed the original film. All of the film's tunes were reused from Kanaa.

No.	Title	Lyrics	Singer(s)	Length
1.	"Muddabanthi"	Krishnakanth	Yazin Nizar	4:12
2.	"Raakasi Gadusu Pilla"	Rambabu Gosala	Ananya Nair, Rahul Sipligunj, Roshitha	4:08
3.	"Repati Kala"	Ramajogayya Sastry	Swaraag Keerthan, Manisha Eerabathini	4:12
4.	"Savaal"	Kasarla Shyam	L. V. Revanth	3:56
5.	"Ooge Pachani"	Kasarla Shyam	Anurag Kulkarni	4:48
Total length:				21:16

== Release and reception ==
The film was released theatrically on 23 August 2019. The Times of India gave 2.5 out of 5 stars stating "An emotional drama centred around cricket. We've seen a lot of Tollywood films based on cricket in recent times, but Kousalya Krishnamurthy has more cricket in it than an actual story". The Deccan Chronicle gave 2.5 out of 5 stars stating "Kousalya Krishnamurthy has a thought-provoking subject but its clichéd presentation detracts from the film".
