= Tamil Nadu Professional Courses Entrance Examination =

Entrance test for colleges in Tamil Nadu, India

The Tamil Nadu Professional Courses Entrance Examination (TNPCEE) was an entrance examination used for admitting students to the Engineering and Medical Colleges in the state of Tamil Nadu in India. It was overseen by Anna University on behalf of the Government of Tamil Nadu. It was scrapped in 2006 and replaced by Unified Single Window Counselling, solely based on +2 board marks.

== Content ==
The Entrance examination contains 3 papers: Mathematics, Physical Science (Physics and Chemistry) and Biology. Each paper carries 50 marks and it follows Multiple Choice Question pattern. The performance in the TNPCEE is combined with the performance in the Class 12 Board Examination to arrive at a "cut-off" which is used to determine the rank of the students. TNPCEE carries 100 marks and Class 12 Board Examination carries 200 marks (marks obtained in Class 12 Board Examination of Mathematics, Physics and Chemistry normalized to 100 marks, 50 marks and 50 marks respectively).

== History ==
TNPCEE was first conducted in 1984 by Anna University. Previously applicants would undergo a face to face interview, but this process was slammed with allegations of corruption and favouritism.

== Controversies ==
For some years there have been controversies surrounding TNPCEE.

- The first one was the wrong questions asked in the question paper which occurred two years in a row.
- The next one is the discarding of the TNPCEE marks for the admission for the academic year of 2005 by the Tamil Nadu Government. This was later reversed by the court and TNPCEE marks were taken into consideration.
- The Tamil Nadu Government deciding to scrap the TNPCEE from the academic year 2006–07 and base admissions into professional courses solely based on the Class 12 examinations. This was reversed by the Madras High Court and the Tamil Nadu Government has appealed in the Supreme Court and its judgment is awaited. The ostensible reason is to create a level playing field for the rural students. The Government claims that urban students have an edge in the Entrance Examination. Almost all the major political parties, the most vociferous being the DMK party, are against TNPCEE.

The Class 12 Board Examination is insufficient when it comes to ranking the students. Many students obtain the same marks and to break the tie it was suggested that date of birth be used. If the date of birth were also to match lots would be used (In 2005–06 when the TN Government discarded TNPCEE marks this happened). This would certainly cause heart-burn among the students. TNPCEE is conducted to reduce the probability of many students obtaining same marks.

In the year 2005, an attempt was made by the erstwhile Tamil Nadu government to revoke TNPCEE pattern of engineering admissions. Tamil Nadu government, based on the reservation policies, defended that the admission be made solely on the 12’Th standard marks. This brought a lot critics attention who warned that would abysmally lower the engineering education since Plus 2 examinations tests mostly of a student's memory retention whereas TNPCEE tests the student's problem solving capabilities. High court of Chennai quashed this idea of admission. Hence the TNPCEE admission system is back in vogue.

== TNPCEE 2006 ==
After all the controversy about scrapping the TNPCEE, the Tamil Nadu government finally decided to hold it on 18 and 19 May 2006.

Initially, all the self-financing and government aided colleges in Tamil Nadu were to admit students considering the cut-off with the TNPCEE marks. Then, by a ruling called the Inaamdar Commission, around 180 self-financing colleges decided to break away from the TNPCEE clique and formed the TNSF (Tamil Nadu Self Financing) Consortium. This consortium then conducted an exam called the CET on 15 and 16 July.

First, this consortium was to fill up 100% of its seats based on a cut-off combining the board marks and the CET marks. But now, by a court ruling, all minority colleges have surrendered 50% of their seats and non-minority colleges have surrendered 70% of their seats to the TNPCEE pool. This means that the CET marks will be used to fill only 50% in minority and 30% in non-minority colleges.

Counselling for general category candidates started on 21 July 2006. The vacancy positions at the end of each day are shown on the Anna University Website. There is, however, no information brochure available online.

The State Government has been following the rule of 69% reservation for SC/ST/OBC etc. This year, a high court ruling has stated that this reservation should not exceed 50%. Due to this, the excess 19% seats have been allocated in the open category under the title FOC - Fifty percent Open Category. This has led to increased number of seats from self-financing and government colleges for the open category.

Also, there will be no second round of counselling for TNPCEE. Seats that have been taken and discarded will not be available to other deserving students but will be wasted for a year and then offered to diploma holders who are eligible for lateral entry.

=== Counselling process ===
The candidates are divided into time-slots according to their state rank and are required to report at the counselling venue at their allotted slot. Here, they can collect their counselling passes after paying the counselling fee.

The students then go to the "Briefing Hall" where there are two big screens showing the seats that are currently available in all colleges under the TNPCEE. Here, the original certificates are verified and the candidates are called for the actually counselling in order of their state rank.

Once in the counselling room, there are around 40 terminals at which students can make their choice. Each terminal has a person who assists the student in the counselling. When a student is allotted a terminal, the student is supposed to enter their top three choices. Before doing this, the student can check up on seat status of various colleges. Once this is done, a screen appears which shows choices and also how many people above you are yet to click their choices. You will be able to freeze a choice only when students above you in rank have frozen theirs. As the number of students above you keeps decreasing, if there is a sure chance of your getting your preferred college and branch, that particular choice becomes green indicating that your seat there is assured.

== See also ==
- Single Window Admissions System
