= Cheran's Journey =

2024 Indian TV series

- Genre: Drama
- Written by: Cheran
- Directed by: Cheran
- Starring: R. Sarathkumar; Prasanna; Aari Arujunan; Kalaiyarasan; Divyabharathi; Kashyap Barbhaya
- Composer: C. Sathya
- Country of origin: India
- Original language: Tamil
- No. of seasons: 1
- No. of episodes: 9

Production
- Producer: N. Gunasekar; K. Dhakshinamoorthy
- Production location: India
- Cinematography: N. K. Ekambaram
- Editor: K.J. Venkataraman
- Running time: 38-55 minutes
- Production company: Compass 8 Films

Original release
- Network: SonyLIV
- Release: 12 January 2024

Cheran’s Journey is a 2024 Indian Tamil-language limited series created and directed by Cheran for SonyLIV, which focuses on five applicants who are shortlisted for a job. It was produced by N. Gunasekar and K. Dhakshinamoorthy, under Compass 8 Films.

The principal characters of the series include R. Sarathkumar, Prasanna, Aari Arujunan, Divyabharathi, Kashyap Barbhaya and Kalaiyarasan. It premiered on 12 January 2024 and consisted of nine episodes.

== Cast ==
=== Main ===
- R. Sarathkumar as Ashok Naataamai
- Prasanna as Raghav Isakkimuthu
- Aari Arujunan as S. Pranav
- Kalaiyarasan as Ameer Sulthan
- Divyabharathi as Latha Vijayakumar Reddy
- Kashyap Barbhaya as Nitesh Gupta

=== Recurring ===
- Jayaprakash
- Jasmine Metivier
- Ilavarasu
- Akash Premkumar
- Aadukalam Naren
- Anju Kurian
- Vela Ramamoorthy
- Bharani
- Karthikeyan P

== Production ==
=== Development ===
The series was announced by SonyLIV in March 2022. The series is produced by N. Gunasekar and K. Dhakshinamoorthy under the Compass 8 Films. The series is written and directed by Cheran, marking his return after Thirumanam. This is his debut in a limited series. The cinematography was handled by N. K. Ekambaram, editing by K.J. Venkataraman, Music by C. Sathya.

=== Casting ===
Actor Aari Arujunan was cast as S. Pranav. This is his first role in a limited series. Initially, actor Aadhi Pinisetty was signed to play one of the lead roles alongside Divyabharathi, Prasanna, Kalaiyarasan and Kashyap Barbhaya in director Cheran’s web series. Later he dropped the series.

=== Release ===
Initially, the first trailer was scheduled to be released on 28 December 2023, but due to the death of Tamil actor and politician Vijayakanth, it was delayed by two days to 30 December 2023 and revealed the release date.

== Reception ==
content is very good and received positive reviews from public.
