= Poornima Ramaswamy =

Indian costume fashion designer and entrepreneur

- Occupations: entrepreneur, fashion costume designer, celebrity stylist
- Known for: fashion designing

Poornima Ramaswamy is an Indian fashion costume designer and entrepreneur. She won a National Film Award for her first film Paradesi (2013), and has continued to work in Indian cinema and stage.

== Career ==
Poornima is related to the owners of fashion retail brand Naidu Hall, and initially began her career by working with the family business and designing outfits for friends. She completed a degree in business management and was interested in taking over the management of the group. After getting married, Poornima resettled in Erode, where she learnt more about handwoven sarees, which she was keen to pass on to Naidu Hall's collections.

She became acquainted to Malar, the wife of director Bala, and through the connection, she gained the chance to work on her first film, Paradesi (2013). The film depicted the tale of slave labourers in the Indian hill country from the 1930s, prompting Poornima to work on get the aesthetics correct. She subsequently won the National Film Award for Best Costume Design for the film.

After Paradesi, she was invited to work on a French film, Son épouse, directed by Michel Spinosa. She has regularly worked with Jyothika since her comeback to Tamil films, collaborating with her in 36 Vayadhinile (2015), Magalir Mattum (2017) and Naachiyaar (2018). She also notably worked on reimagining Madhavan's appearance in Irudhi Suttru (2006) and Rajkiran's look in Dhanush's Pa. Pandi (2017). She has pushed for the use of handloom fabric in films, often dressing the cast in organic cotton material.

== Notable filmography ==
- Paradesi (2013)
- Vai Raja Vai (2015)
- 36 Vayadhinile (2015)
- Irudhi Suttru (2016)
- Saala Khadoos (2016)
- Pa. Pandi (2017)
- 36 Vayadhinile (2015)
- Theeran Adhigaaram Ondru (2017)
- Thaanaa Serndha Koottam (2018)
- Naachiyaar (2018)
- Kaatrin Mozhi (2018)
- Nerkonda Paarvai (2019)
- Jackpot (2019)
- Raatchasi (2019)
- Boomerang (2019)
- Thambi (2019)
- Soorarai Pottru (2020)
- Putham Pudhu Kaalai (2020)
- Paava Kadhaigal (2020)
- Suzhal: The Vortex (2022)
- Jai Bhim (2021)
- Udanpirappe (2021)
- Anbarivu (2022)
- Paramporul (2023)
- Let's Get Married (2023)
- Salaar: Part 1 – Ceasefire (2023)
- Dhoomam (2023)
- Captain Miller (3024)
- Raghu Thatha (2024)
- Darling (2024)
- Thalaimai Seyalagam (2024)
- Srikanth (2024)
- Test (2024)
- Dude (2025)
- ‘’ Kingston ‘’(2025)
- ‘’ Parasakthi’’ (2026)
- ‘’ Vaa Vaathiyaar’’ (2026)
- ‘’ Sardar 2 ’’ (upcoming)
- Messaya Murukku 2 (upcoming)
