= Vaa Thamizha Vaa =

- Also known as: Vaa Thamizha Vaa
- Genre: Talk show
- Based on: Neeya Naana
- Presented by: Karu Palaniappan; Aari Arujunan
- Country of origin: India
- Original language: Tamil

Production
- Camera setup: Multi-camera
- Running time: approx. 40–45 minutes per episode
- Production company: Cheers Network

Original release
- Network: Kalaignar TV
- Release: 11 June 2023 – present

Related
- Neeya Naana

Vaa Thamizha Vaa (transl. Come Thamizha come) is a 2023 Indian Tamil-language reality Talk show, that airs on Kalaignar TV from 11 June 2023 and is also presented on Kalaignar TV's YouTube channel. The show was initially hosted by Karu Palaniappan and from season 3 on 14 April 2024 it is hosted by Aari Arujunan. It is adapted from the Star Vijay's show Neeya Naana.

== Overview ==
Season	Episodes	Original broadcast		Host
Season	Episodes	First aired	Last aired	Host
1,2	50+	11 June 2023	March 2024	Karu Palaniappan
3,4,5	TBA	14 April 2024	TBA	Aari Arujunan

== Premise ==
The shows format is identical to that of Gopinath Chandran's shows Neeya Naana that airs on Star Vijay. The show revolves around Karu Palaniappan (former)/Aari Arujunan and his team invites every week, one topic is chosen and two groups of people representing the extreme ends face each other and discuss on the show.

== Host ==
Karu Palaniappan hosted the Zee Tamil's show Tamizha Tamizha from 2018 to 2023, but quit the show due to political reasons and joined Kalaignar TV to host Vaa Thamizha Vaa from 11 June 2023. However, after a year he was replaced by Aari Arujunan from 14 April 2024.
