= Lingam (TV series) =

- Genre: Crime drama
- Created by: Prasanth Pandiyaraj
- Written by: Lakshmi Saravanakumar
- Directed by: Lakshmi Saravanakumar
- Starring: Kathir; Divyabharathi; Shahir; Poornima Ravi; Bose Venkat; Nikhila Sankar; Shanmugam Muthusamy; Prasanth Pandiyaraj; M. Chandrakumar; Jai Krishna; Kiccha Ravi; Dileepan
- Composer: Tony Britto
- Country of origin: India
- Original language: Tamil
- No. of seasons: 1
- No. of episodes: 8

Production
- Producers: Raadhika Srinivasan; B. Srinivasan
- Cinematography: Dinesh Purushothaman
- Editor: Ganesh Siva
- Running time: 30-35 minutes
- Production company: Vikatan Televistas

Original release
- Network: JioHotstar
- Release: 26 June 2026 – present

Lingam is a 2026 Indian Tamil-language crime drama television series created by Prasanth Pandiyaraj for JioHotstar. The series is inspired by the life of V. Lingam, a notorious gangster from Kanyakumari district from 1987 to 1995.The series is written and directed by Lakshmi Saravanakumar and produced by Raadhika Srinivasan and B. Srinivasan under the banner of Vikatan Televistas.

It follows the dark transformation of a talented Kabaddi champion who is falsely accused of murder on the brink of his athletic success, forcing him into a violent and dangerous underworld. The series stars Kathir, Divyabharathi, Shahir and Poornima Ravi in lead roles. It was released on JioHotstar for its label Hotstar Specials on 26 June 2026.

== Plot ==
Muthulingam "Lingam", a brilliant kabaddi champion whose ambition of joining the police force is crushed by a tragic, unjust incident. Wrongfully accused, he is cast into a ruthless criminal underworld. Driven by intense grief and vengeance following the murder of his mentor, Chellapandian, Lingam targets the powerful antagonist, Samiyappan. His path takes a dangerous turn when he attempts to protect a young couple, thrusting him into a massive crisis that forces him into hiding.

== Cast ==
- Kathir as Muthulingam "Lingam"
- Divyabharathi as Ponmalar "Malar", Lingam's love interest turned to wife (Voice dubbed by Bhavani Vaithiyalingam)
- Shahir as Thiru, Lingam's friend
- Poornima Ravi as Padma, Thiru's love interest
- Bose Venkat as Advocate Chelladurai
- Nikhila Sankar as Sathya
- Shanmugam Muthusamy as Shanmugam
- Prasanth Pandiyaraj as Seelan
- M. Chandrakumar as Chellapandian
- Jai Krishna as Samiyappan
- Kiccha Ravi as Murugan
- Dileepan as Alphonse
- Ragu Esakki as Gunaseelan
- Phathmen as Martin
- Reshma Prasad as Kani, Chellapandian's daughter
- Kaali Venkat as Annachi
- Bharathi Bala
- Murali Abbas
- Vastho
- Arun
- Aadukalam Stellaraj
- Anathi
- Bakyaraj
- Umesh
- Guna Sekharan
- Uthirapathi Karunakaran
- Peter J. Chandran
- S. Trichy Maya
- Suthagar
- Vimal (cameo appearance)
- Bala Saravanan (cameo appearance)

== Episodes ==
No.	Title	Directed by	Written by	Original release date
1	"First Wave of the Ocean"	Lakshmi Saravanakumar	Lakshmi Saravanakumar	26 June 2026
2	"Shadow of the Cry"	Lakshmi Saravanakumar	Lakshmi Saravanakumar	26 June 2026
3	"The Fury of Fate"	Lakshmi Saravanakumar	Lakshmi Saravanakumar	26 June 2026
4	"The Sea Rises"	Lakshmi Saravanakumar	Lakshmi Saravanakumar	26 June 2026
5	"The Season of Betrayal"	Lakshmi Saravanakumar	Lakshmi Saravanakumar	26 June 2026
6	"The Chill of a Mild Tremor"	Lakshmi Saravanakumar	Lakshmi Saravanakumar	26 June 2026
7	"The Breaking Palm Tree"	Lakshmi Saravanakumar	Lakshmi Saravanakumar	26 June 2026
8	"The Burning Sea"	Lakshmi Saravanakumar	Lakshmi Saravanakumar	26 June 2026

== Production ==
=== Development ===
Lingam was written and directed by Lakshmi Saravanakumar, who based the series on the life of V. Lingam, a notorious gangster from Kanyakumari district, while fictionalising several incidents for dramatic purposes. Filmmaker Prasanth Pandiyaraj, known for Vilangu, joined the project as its presenter. The series was produced by Vikatan Televistas for Hotstar Specials and was officially announced as part of the platform's slate of 25 Tamil original productions in December 2025.

=== Casting ===
In December 2025, Kathir was announced to portray the titular character, Lingam. Divyabharathi was cast as the female lead, while Shahir, Poornima Ravi, Bose Venkat, Nikhila Sankar, and Vimal joined the supporting cast.

=== Release ===
The first trailer of Lingam was released on 6 June 2026, showcasing the transformation of an aspiring police officer and kabaddi player into a feared gangster after being falsely accused of murder.The series premiered on JioHotstar on 26 June 2026 in Tamil, Telugu, Malayalam, Kannada, Hindi, Marathi and Bengali.

== Music ==
The series has music and background score composed by Tony Britto, in his maiden collaboration with Kathir and Lakshmi Saravanakumar. The audio rights were acquired by Star India Pvt. Ltd.

Track listing
No.	Title	Lyrics	Singer(s)	Length
1.	"Vidhi"	Kurinchi Prabha	Santhosh Narayanan	3:52
2.	"Pesa Mozhiye"	Mohan Rajan; Kurinchi Prabha	Sathyaprakash; Dhanyashree	4:20
3.	"Ithu Enna"	Kurinchi Prabha	Sireesha Bhagavatula	3:06
4.	"Yeale Makka"	Kurinchi Prabha	Sathyan; Senthildass Velayutham	3:12
5.	"Pori Parakutha"	Fernando S. Manoharan	Tony Britto	2:53
6.	"Kuruthi"	Jayamkondar; Kurinchi Prabha	Senthildass Velayutham	3:24
7.	"Thiru Entry"	Sanjith Roy	Sanjith Roy	1:55

== Reception ==
=== Critical response ===
Jeevaganesh P. of Ananda Vikatan wrote that, "Even though it changes direction in the second half, 'Lingam' is definitely worth watching as it is a good start and thriller for a gangster movie".
