= Dharani (film) =

2015 Indian film by Guhan Sambandham

- Directed by: Guhan Sambandham
- Written by: Guhan Sambandam
- Produced by: VGS Narendran
- Starring: Aari Arujunan; Elango Kumaravel; Sandra Amy; Ajay Krishna
- Cinematography: Vinoth Gandhi; R.Prakash
- Edited by: V. Don Bosco
- Music by: Yensone Bakyanathan
- Production company: Melody Movies
- Distributed by: Dream Factory
- Release date: 30 January 2015
- Country: India
- Language: Tamil

Dharani (English: World, Earth) is a 2015 Tamil film written and directed by Guhan Sambandham and produced by V.G.S Narendran under the banner of Melody Movies. The film has an ensemble cast, which includes Aari Arujunan, Ajay Krishna, Elango Kumaravel Sandra Amy. R. Prakash and Vinoth Gandhi jointly handled the cinematography, while Ensone scored the music for this film. The film which began production in 2009, released across Tamil Nadu on 30 January 2015.

== Plot ==
The plot is set in a rural backdrop where three middle-class characters running a hotel come across three different circumstances facing three important life decisions that are going to change their lives forever. The film charts the path taken by them to achieve their goal and details how they traverse through to nowhere.

== Cast ==
- Aari Arujunan as Sekhar
- Elango Kumaravel as Mahesh
- Sandra Amy as Thilaka
- Ajay Krishna as Kathiresan
- Anjathe Sridhar
- Jeyakumar
- Varnika

== Production ==
The writer gained inspiration to make the film after reading Robert Frost's poem, The Road Not Taken. Aari Arujunan signed on to appear in the project in 2009, the first feature film he had signed, but delays meant production only began in the middle 2010. The film progressed slowly through production since 2010, and readied for a release, nearly five years after production began. Following the success of Nedunchaalai (2014), production restarted and Aari agreed to spare dates to help complete the film by late 2014.

== Music ==
B. Ensone, who earlier worked as a conductor for various music directors of Tamil film industry has made his debut as music director with this film and composed the film's soundtrack album and background score. The album consists of 6 songs with one theme music instrumental track all composed by Ensone. Kavingar Muthulingam, Palani Bharathi, and Pulavar S.M, Tiruvenkadam penned the lyrics for the songs. Another highlight of the album is two koothu songs were sung by Veeramanidasan and Pushpavanam Kuppusamy. The soundtrack album was released on 19 December 2014 in the presence of K. Bhagyaraj, Mysskin, and D. Imman.

No.	Title	Lyrics	Singer(s)	Length
1.	"Vazhkai Enbathu Vaanavilla"	Kavingar Muthulingam	Balram	05:52
2.	"Thiraikadal Olipol Yarkum"	Pulavar Se.Mu.Thiruvengadam	Veeramanidasan, Pushpavanam Kuppusamy	04:51
3.	"Malapola Unna Sumanthenae"	Palani Bharathi	Vijay Yesudas, Chinmayi	05:35
4.	"Yar Kobam"	Palani Bharathi	Bhavan, Murali, Sundhararajan, Chandran	02:56
5.	"Kanavae Kanavae"	Palani Bharathi	Unni Menon	05:11
6.	"Manida Payalay Rama"	Pulavar Se.Mu.Thiruvengadam	Veeramanidasan, PushpavanamKuppusamy	04:58
7.	"Battle Field (Theme)"		"Singing Violin" M. Kalyan and Chennai Strings	04:41

== Review ==
The film, Dharani received mixed reviews. It is a movie without dance numbers. The songs that appear are contextual. Reviewing for Times Of India, M Suganth gave 2.5 * and said that the first half was bleak and unforgiving... the first half makes us empathize with the three lead characters"... especially "Ajaykrishna’s pitiable state in the first half makes us empathize with his character" . "Despite the sincere storytelling, Dharani feels clichéd as the plight of the leads seem all-too familiar", however, "... the actors make us care for these characters".
