= Good Wife (TV series) =

- Promotional release poster
- Genre: Legal drama; Political drama
- Based on: The Good Wife by: Robert King; Michelle King
- Written by: Halitha Shameem
- Directed by: Revathi
- Starring: Priyamani; Aari Arujunan; Sampath Raj; Mekha Rajan; Amrutha Srinivasan
- Music by: K
- Country of origin: India
- Original language: Tamil
- No. of seasons: 1
- No. of episodes: 6

Production
- Executive producers: Vibhaas Singh Gautam; Kirubakaran Ramasamy
- Producers: Rajesh Chadha; Mrinalini Jain; Shyam Rathi; Deepak Dhar; Rishi Negi; S. Raj Narayanan
- Cinematography: Siddharth Ramaswamy
- Editor: Kishan Kumar Chezhian
- Running time: 38-42 minutes
- Production companies: Banijay Asia; Circle Box Entertainment; Paramount Global Content Distribution

Original release
- Network: JioHotstar
- Release: 4 July 2025 – present

Good Wife is a 2025 Indian Tamil-language legal drama television series starring Priyamani, Aari Arujunan, Sampath Raj, Mekha Rajan, Amrutha Srinivasan, and directed by Revathi. The series is a homemaker and former lawyer who, after few years, starts working at a law firm to support her family when her husband gets stuck in a political scandal. It premiered on JioHotstar on 4 July 2025.

The second season of this series is planned to get released by 2026.

== Series overview ==
Series	Episodes	Originally released	
Series	Episodes	First released	Last released
1	6	4 July 2025	TBA

== Premise ==
The plot revolves around Tarunika, a law school graduate, who is a loving wife and mother who, after quitting her job following marriage. When her husband, Gunaseelan, is arrested for a sex and corruption scandal, she starts working as a junior lawyer at a law firm to support her family and faces courtroom battles and finding her identity in a male-dominated world.

== Cast ==
=== Main ===
- Priyamani as Tarunika Gunaseelan
- Sampath Raj as Gunaseelan; Tarunika's husband
- Aari Arujunan as Hari Deepak
- Mekha Rajan as Lavanya Umashankar
- Amrutha Srinivasan as Sneha Merlin

=== Recurring ===
- Adithya Shivpink as Sneha Merlin's love interest
- T. Siva as Gunaseelan's friend
- T. M. Karthik
- Mona Bedre as Tarunika's friend
- Nakkalites Dhanam as Gunaseelan's mother and Tarunika's mother-in-law
- Ajit Koshy

=== Episodic ===
- Revathi

== Episodes ==
No.	Title	Directed by	Written by	Original release date
1	"Her Honour"	Revathi	Halitha Shameem	4 July 2025
2	"The Betrayal"	Revathi	Halitha Shameem	4 July 2025
3	"The Taste of Victory"	Revathi	Halitha Shameem	4 July 2025
4	"Henceforth known as Property"	Revathi	Halitha Shameem	4 July 2025
5	"Old Flame"	Revathi	Halitha Shameem	4 July 2025
6	"What lies Beneath"	Revathi	Halitha Shameem	4 July 2025

== Production ==
=== Development ===
It is an adaptation of Robert King and Michelle King's The Good Wife. It is the second Indian remake after the Hindi language The Trial.

The series was announced by Jio Hotstar on June 3, a day ahead of actress Priyamani’s birthday. The series was written by Halitha Shameem. The show has been directed by actress and filmmaker Revathi, who makes her Tamil directorial debut in a limited series with it. Produced by Rajesh Chadha, Mrinalini Jain, Shyam Rathi, Deepak Dhar, Rishi Negi and S. Raj Narayanan under Banijay Asia, Circle Box Entertainment and Paramount Global Content Distribution. The series was music composed by K, while editing by Kishan Kumar Chezhian. Siddharth Ramaswamy served as co-director and cinematographer on the show.

=== Casting ===
The series stars Priyamani as lead role in his fourth collaboration acted in limited series after The Family Man, His Story and Sarvam Shakthi Mayam. Actor Sampath Raj was cast as Tarunika's husband Gunaseelan, Aari Arujunan was cast as Hari Deepak.

=== Release ===
The first poster was released on 3 June 2025 featuring, The poster shows actress Priyamani holding a bunch of court documents and both side her kids, while Sampath Raj is in the background, behind bars, with the rest of the image filled up with newspaper clippings.

The series Teaser was released on 12 June 2025 with the trailer on 26 June announcing the release date of 4 July. The show premiered in Tamil, Telugu, Hindi, Malayalam, Kannada, Bengali and Marathi languages on JioHotstar.

== Reception ==
=== Critical response ===
Harshini SV of The Times of India gave 2.5/5 stars and wrote, "Such layered writing draws you in at times, as does the unusual premise of the legal cases, but you wish these were more than just fleeting moments". Anusha Sundar of OTTplay gave 2.5/5 stars and wrote, "Good Wife may not be with shocking twists and turns and that’s okay. It takes its time to do a slow start, and might have some interesting pockets of story arcs. It is a slow take-off, and (if) seasons to follow up can increase the pace, to make things move faster and interesting, then Good Wife can possibly be a good addition to the Tamil OTT space".
