= Bannari Amman Institute of Technology =

Engineering college in Tamil Nadu, India

- Other name: BIT Sathy
- Type: Autonomous Private Engineering College
- Established: 1996; 30 years ago
- Academic affiliations: Anna University, Chennai
- Chairman: S V B
- Principal: C Palanisamy
- Location: Sathyamangalam, Erode, Tamil Nadu, India, 638401; 11.4986°N 77.2743°E
- Campus: 181 acres (73 ha)
- Website: www.bitsathy.ac.in

Bannari Amman Institute of Technology is an engineering college located in Sathyamangalam, Erode, Tamil Nadu, India. It was founded by the Bannari Amman Group in 1996 and is affiliated to Anna University. The institute offers 21 undergraduate, 10 postgraduate programmes in Engineering, Technology and Management studies. All the departments of Engineering and Technology are recognized by Anna University, Chennai to offer Ph.D. programmes.

== Programmes offered ==
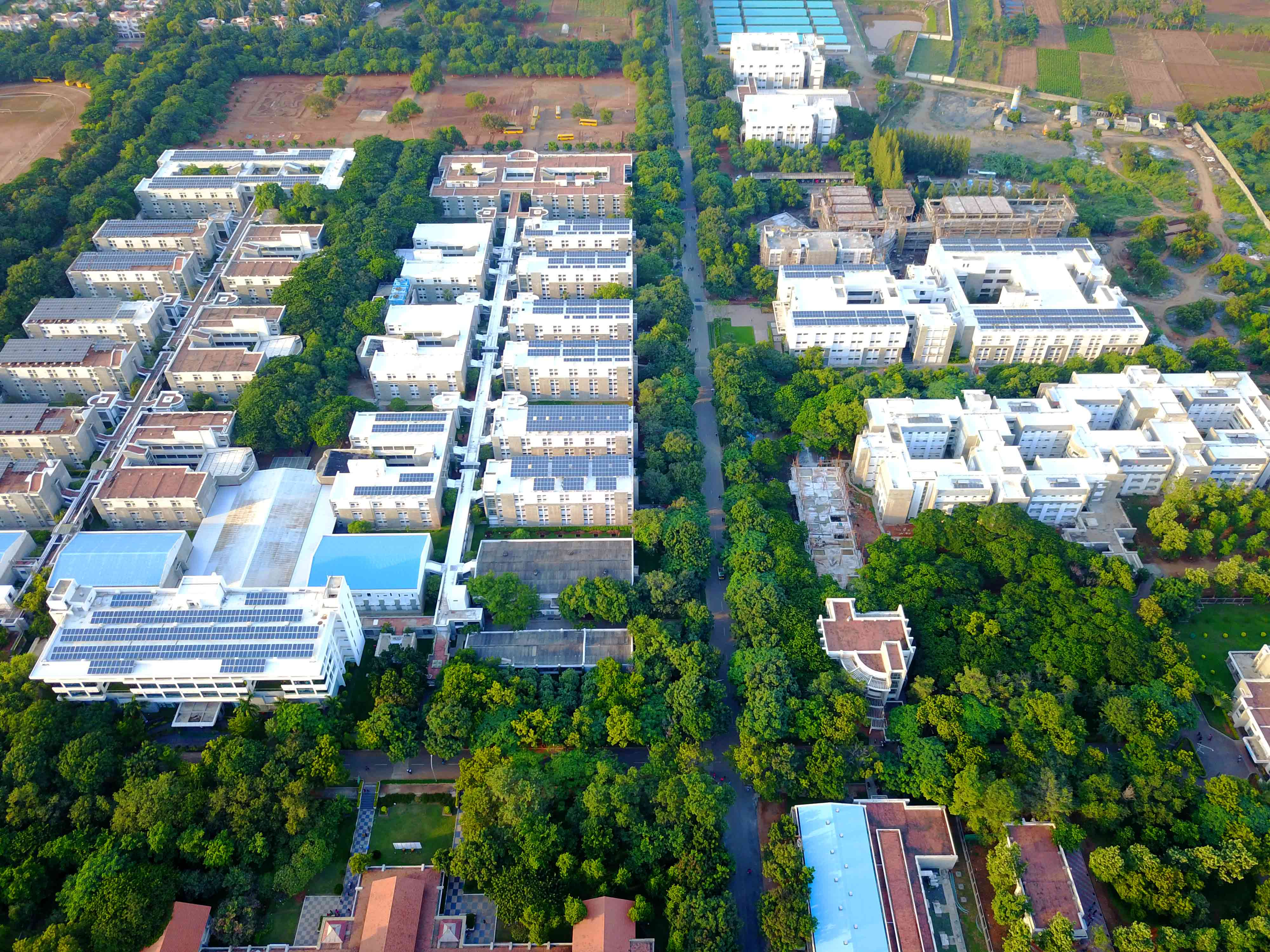
Aerial view

=== Undergraduate Programmes ===
Bachelor of Engineering in

- Biomedical Engineering
- Computer Science & Engineering
- Electrical & Electronics Engineering
- Electronics & Instrumentation Engineering
- Mechanical Engineering
- Mechatronics Engineering

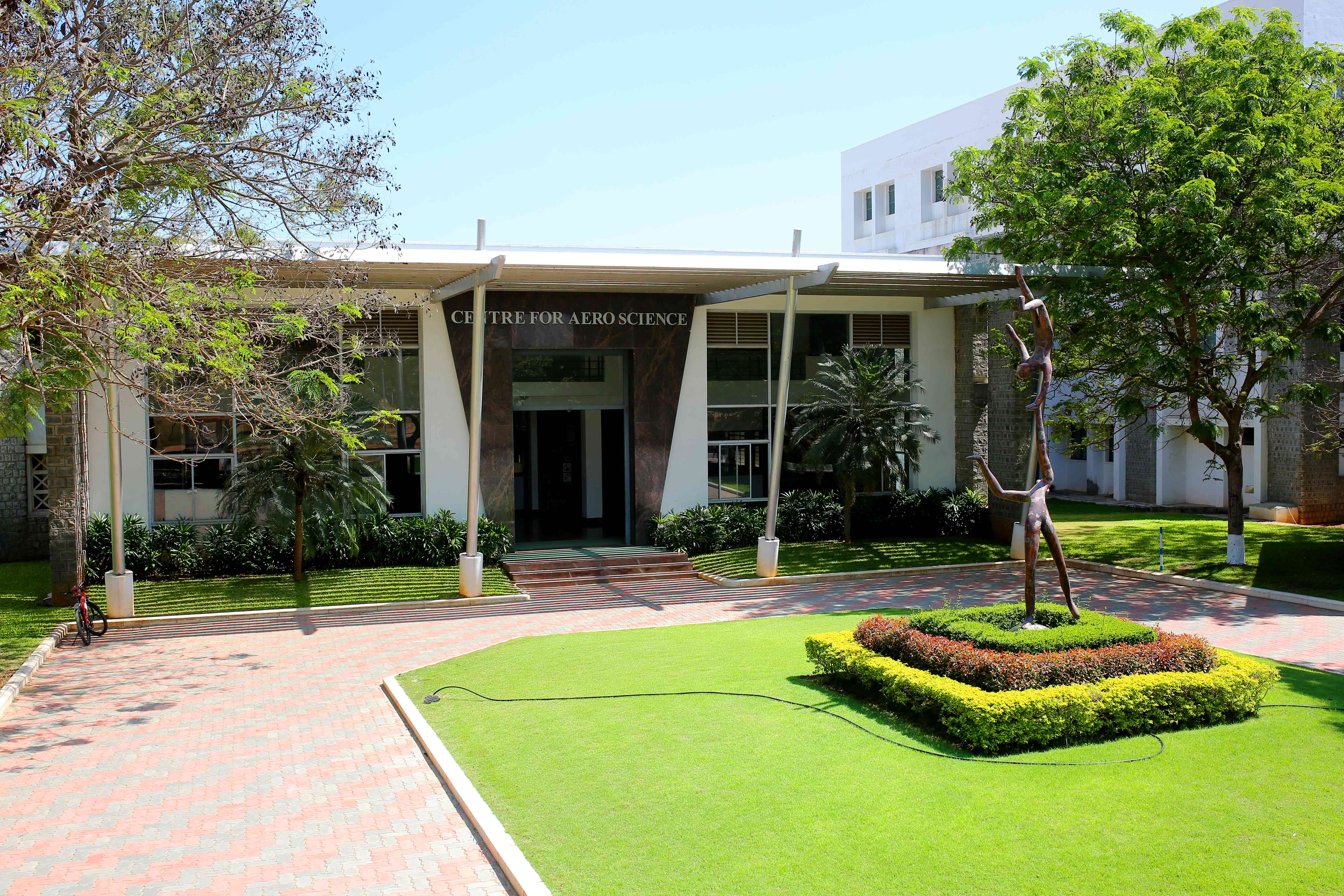
Bannari Amman Institute of Technology

=== Postgraduate Programmes ===
Master of Engineering in

- Communication Systems
- Computer Science & Engineering
- Industrial Automation & Robotics
- Industrial Safety & Engineering
- Software Engineering
- Structural Engineering

Master of Technology in

- Biotechnology

Master of Business Administration

=== B.TECH / BE. / M.S. (by research) Programmes ===
- Agriculture Engineering
- Biotechnology
- Computer Science & Engineering
- Electrical & Electronics Engineering
- Electronics & Communication Engineering
- Electronics & Instrumentation Engineering
- Information Technology
- Mechanical Engineering
- Mechatronics
- Physics
- Chemistry

== Admissions ==
Admissions is through Tamil Nadu Engineering Admission (TNEA) ranking based on 12th standard exam results facilitated by Directorate Of Technical Education (DoTE). ME/M.Tech admissions are based on ranking in TANCET examination conducted by Anna University. The Counselling code of the Institution is 2702.Management seats are available after the final round of counselling.

== Infrastructure ==
Library

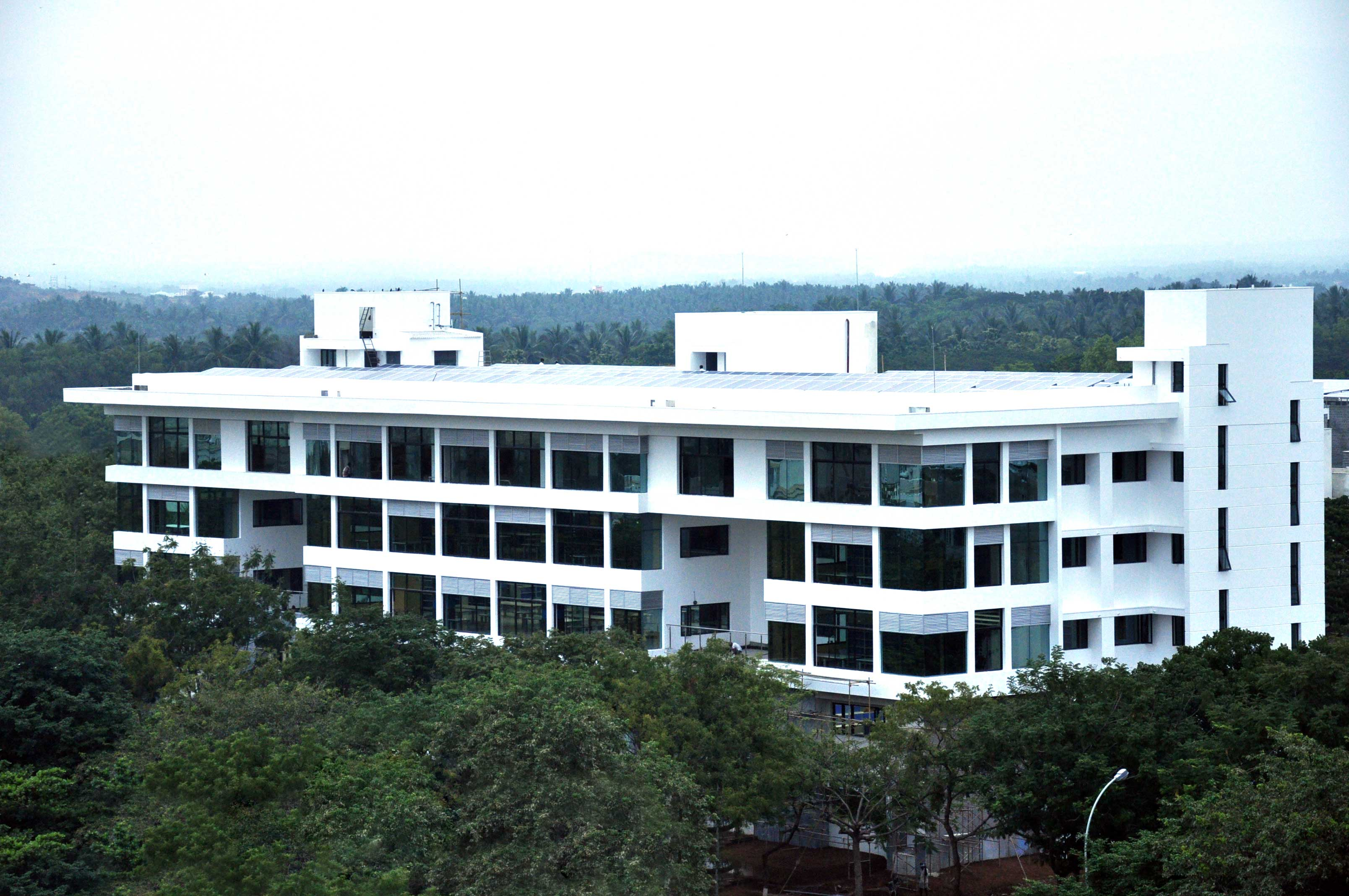
Learning Centre

The five-storeyed, computerized library is well-stacked. 83000 Volumes, 400 National and International Journals, 6500 CD-ROMs, a Digital Library with 6000 e-journals, 274 NPTEL and 166 NITTTR video courses are part of the resources. BIT is an Institutional member of the British Council Library, Chennai, DELNET, New Delhi and INDEST Consortium, New Delhi.

Hostels

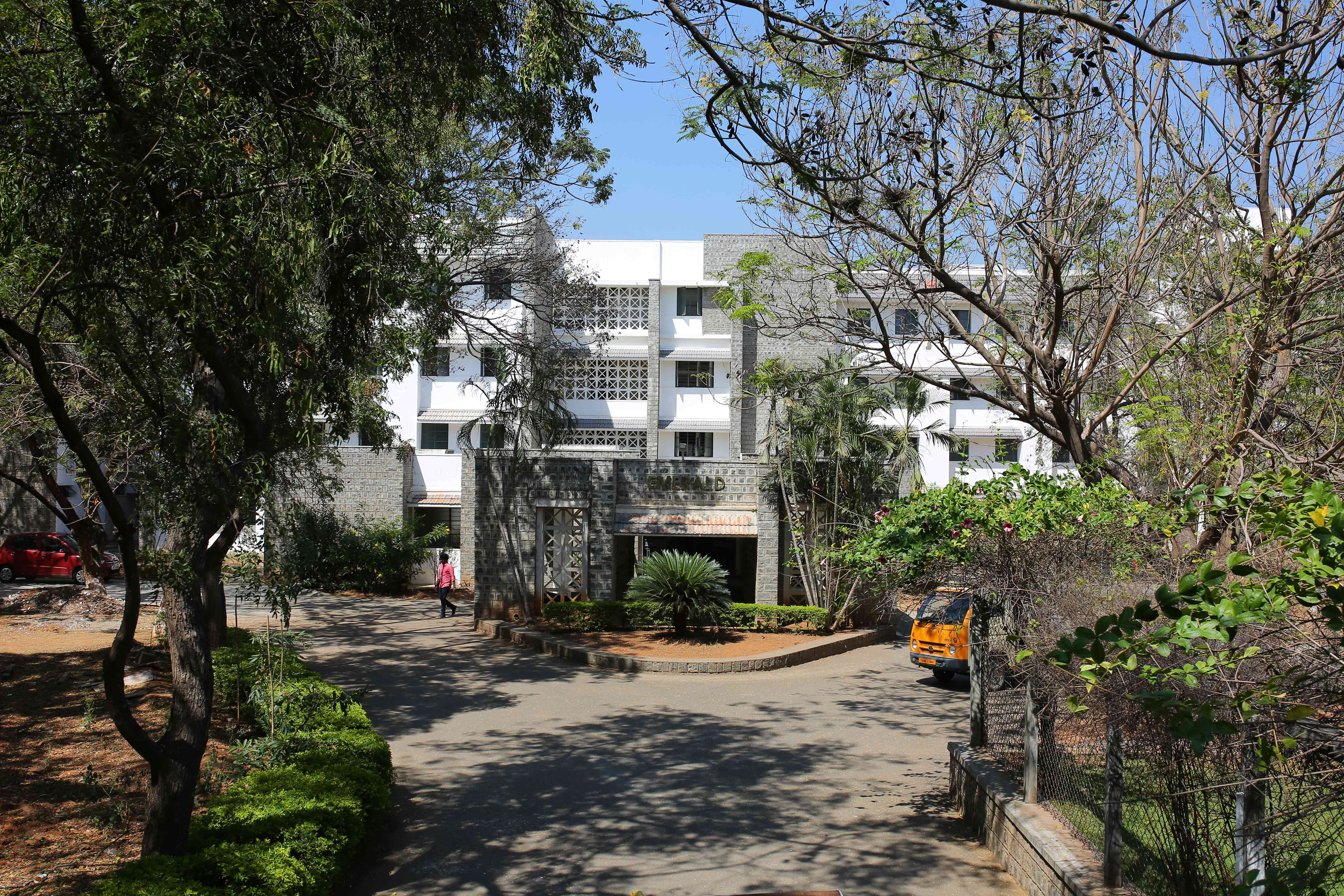
Emerald Hostel

The institute has four hostels for male students and five hostels for female students. All hostels are fully furnished and single, double and four occupancy rooms are available

Hostel Details:

Gents Hostel - 3931 residents

Ladies Hostel - 2191 residents

Other Facilities in Hostel: Dining Halls, Indoor Courts for Shuttle & Table Tennis.

Sports

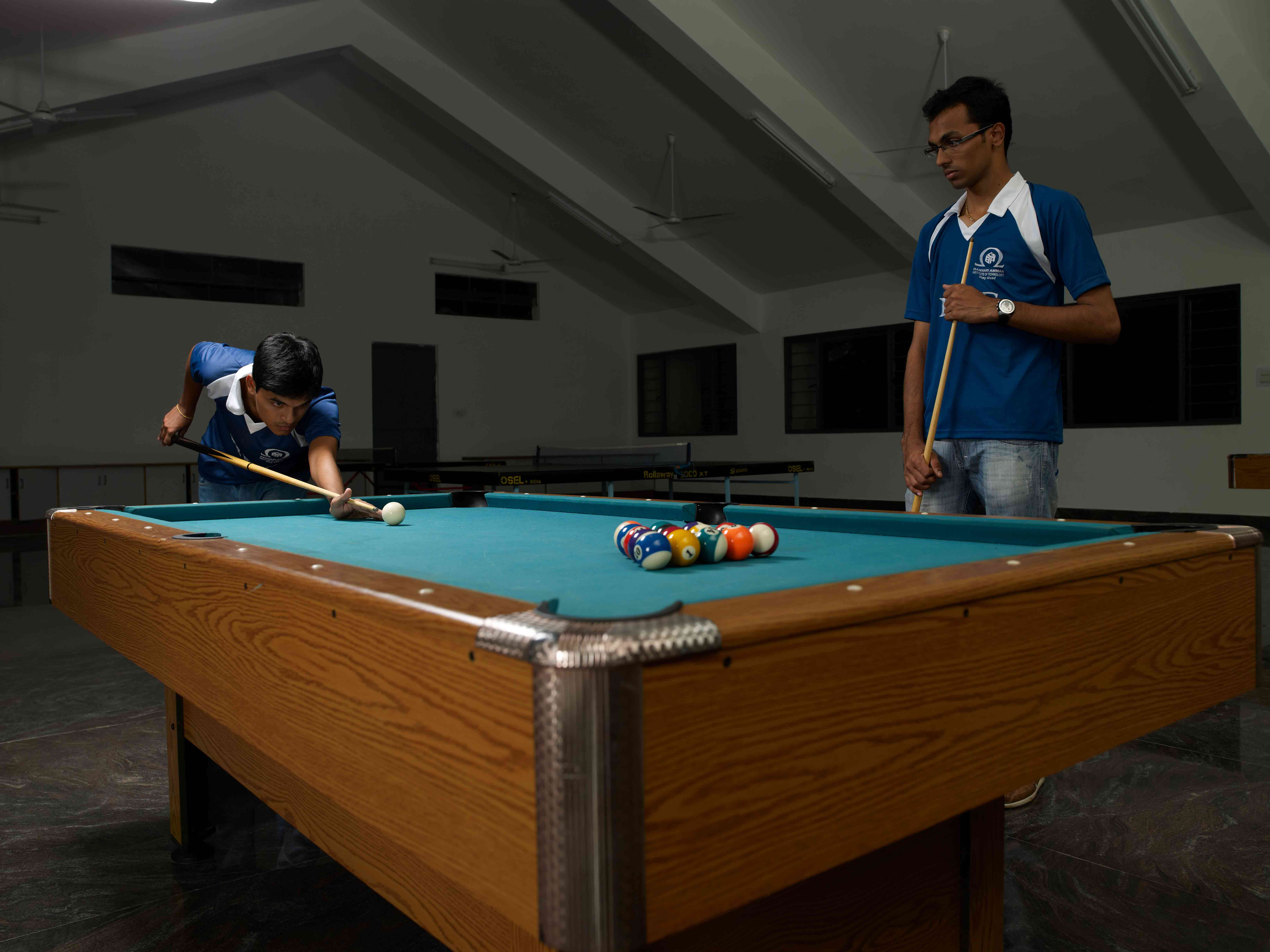
Indoor Sports

All necessary sports facilities with state-of-the-art technology are available in the campus. The Existing sports facilities for students includes 400 m standard athletic track with 8 lanes including a Long Jump & Triple Jump Pit, Sectors for Shot-put, Discus & Javelin throws,

In additional, it has also a standard bed for High jump and Pole vault events, a football field and two kho- kho courts, a Hockey field with kerb, 65 m radius cricket field with two net practice pitches & one portable nets, two Volleyball courts, two Ball Badminton Courts,

one Handball Courts and two Kabaddi Courts. Total area of the BIT Play Field is 5,74,580 sq. ft.

Auditorium

An indoor Vedanayagam auditorium with a capacity to seat 750 students.

Town Hall

A main auditorium with a capacity to seat 2500 students.

== Placements ==
Undergraduate Placement Statistics (2024–2025)
S.No.	Degree	Course	Intake	Students placed	Placement %
1	B.E.	Aeronautical Engineering	20	7	35.0%
2	B.Tech	Agricultural Engineering	39	22	56.4%
3	B.Tech	Artificial Intelligence and Data Science	129	96	74.4%
4	B.Tech	Artificial Intelligence and Machine Learning	62	43	69.4%
5	B.E.	Automobile Engineering	26	19	73.1%
6	B.Tech	Biotechnology	89	43	48.3%
7	B.E.	Biomedical Engineering	36	23	63.9%
8	B.Tech	Computer Science and Business Systems	64	48	75.0%
9	B.E.	Computer Science and Engineering	260	188	72.3%
10	B.Tech	Computer Technology	62	41	66.1%
11	B.E.	Civil Engineering	42	13	31.0%
12	B.E.	Electronics and Communication Engineering	249	189	75.9%
13	B.E.	Electrical and Electronics Engineering	125	97	77.6%
14	B.E.	Electronics and Instrumentation Engineering	52	38	99.9%
15	B.Tech	Food Technology	50	11	22.0%
16	B.Tech	Fashion Technology	23	8	34.8%
17	B.E.	Information Science and Engineering	56	43	76.8%
18	B.Tech	Information Technology	189	136	72.0%
19	B.E.	Mechanical Engineering	120	89	74.2%
20	B.E.	Mechatronics	55	37	67.3%
21	B.Tech	Textile Technology	48	34	70.8%

== Rankings ==
College rankings

Engineering – India
- Private colleges
- Outlook India (2022): 96

BIT was ranked 96 among private engineering colleges in India by Outlook India in 2022.
