= Ellaam Mela Irukuravan Paathuppan =

2023 Indian Tamil-language film

- Directed by: U. Kaviraj
- Starring: Aari Arujunan; Shaashvi Bala; Rajendran; Sai Dheena; Bagavathi Perumal
- Music by: Karthik Aacharya
- Country of origin: India
- Original language: Tamil

Production
- Producer: Mohammed Abubucker
- Cinematography: J. Laxman
- Editor: U. Kaviraj
- Running time: 131 mins
- Production company: Rowther Films

Original release
- Network: Colors Tamil
- Release: March 26, 2023

Ellaam Mela Irukuravan Paathuppan (transl. The one above will take care of everything) is a 2023 Indian Tamil-language science fiction comedy film directed by U. Kaviraj. The film stars Aari Arujunan and Shaashvi Bala in the lead roles, with Rajendran, Sai Dheena and Bagavathi Perumal in supporting roles. Produced by Rowther Films, it was released on 26 March 2023 in a direct television premiere via Colors Tamil.

Prior to its release, the film was widely promoted as the "first Tamil alien film", despite MGR starring Kalai Arasi (1963) being the first.

== Plot ==
Ragu is a jobless Engineering graduate, who has no place to stay and seeks refugee with his native place friend Aravind Samy. He works in a restaurant as a cook along with Thirunavukarasu, Mani and Vasudevan, who share the same room. Ragu also has a girlfriend who works as a makeup artist for a superstar in the cinema industry. One night while going near the room of assumed dead son of the restaurant Ragu finds a mysterious device and acquires superhuman powers.

But while he is sleeping his roommates find it and discover their physical inabilities like stammering for thiruna, amnesia for mani, anosmia and ageusia for Vasu has healed while holding the device. They fight for its hold and breaks it into four pieces. Since it is broken it does not provide super powers to any one but highly elevated their weakness. Ragu gets a sharp eye sight, Thiruna gets the ability to speak all languages, Mani remembers even his past lifetimes and Vasu has elevated sense of smelling.

For the loan brought on name of restaurant, a ruthless Loan Shark Raajali holds Aravind as captive and demanded 20 Lakh rupees in three days. Mani remembering he used to work for him as the broker who used to bring women for Raajali to have hot sex with, came up with an idea to steal money from Raajali itself and payback the debt. After they successfully steal the money by using a woman worker in the restaurant to have steamy sex with Raajali, they release Aravind but later Raajali found he has been cheated and went to kill the gang. The team as self defense counterattack and beat him to death and flee the crime scene. While fleeing they were shocked as they hit Karuna, son of the restaurant owner who is assumed dead.

Karuna explains the team that he has been abducted by aliens several times and came to know of their plan to wipe out the humanity and he steals their "Quantam" which is important to execute their plan. Meanwhile, an alien took the form of Superstar started searching for the Quantam device. With help of his girlfriend and Vasu, Ragu finds identity of the Alien and decides to kill it. But the Alien after seeing the life of Human changed its mind and decided to help the Team and wish to live in the earth. But that is intervened by another Alien who took the form of Raajali. A fight ensues, but at last they trick the alien by placing one part in fake device and manipulates them to retrieve the decoy while safely burying the remaining parts in a sewers. They even saved the good alien by switching it with real Superstar to be taken in spaceship.

The movie concludes with lightning flash acting as neutralizer which makes everyone forget about all these happenings.

== Cast ==
- Aari Arujunan as Ragu
- Shaashvi Bala
- Rajendran as Superstar Rajeshkanth and alien (dual role)
- Sai Dheena as Raajali and alien (dual role)
- Bagavathi Perumal as Thirunavukarasu
- Bijesh Nagesh as Karuna
- R. Sharath as Vasudevan
- Mohammed Abubucker as Mani
- 'Vijay TV' Pazhani as Aravind Swamy
- K. Sivasankar as Ganapathy
- Mariya Charm
- 'Pichaikaran' Ramesh

== Production ==
Production on the film began in early 2018, with Aari Arujunan announcing that he would work on a "space film with aliens" directed by debutant U. Kaviraj and produced by Rowther Films, which made a comeback to film production after a long break. Kaviraj had earlier worked as a programme producer on TV shows like Konjam Nadinga Boss and Maama Neenga Enga Irukkinga. Sri Lankan-born actress Shaashvi Bala was cast in the lead role, while Rajendran, Sai Dheena and Bagavathi Perumal were selected for other supporting roles. By October 2018, the film had reached the final stage of its shoot. The title of the film Ellaam Mela Irukuravan Paathuppan (The one above will take care of everything) was inspired by a film dialogue spoken by Goundamani from Aavarampoo.

== Soundtrack ==
Soundtrack was composed by Karthik Acharya.

- "Super Hero" – Benny Dayal
- "Johnny Johnny" – Kamala Hariharan
- "Ellam Mela" – Velmurugan

== Release ==
After remaining unreleased for several years, the film faced significant production hurdles. Following the release of the film’s music and trailer, director Kaviraj reportedly received his fees from the producers and became unresponsive during the critical post-production phase. Consequently, the production house initiated the editing process independently. Kaviraj later returned during the final stages and insisted on re-editing the entire film, causing further delays to its release. the makers announced that the film would have a theatrical release across Tamil Nadu on 7 April 2023 through the distributor Saraswati Enterprises. In a turn of events, the film was selected by Colors Tamil for a direct television premiere on 26 March 2023. Despite the prolonged delays in post-production reportedly due in part to his own absence and later intervention, director Kaviraj expressed satisfaction with the final release strategy, stating that the film “would reach a larger audience through the premiere.” The statement was viewed by some as contradictory, considering the delays were largely a result of his own actions, which significantly jeopardized the film’s release timeline and momentum. The prolonged production and financial setbacks reportedly led to losses for the production house, and Rowther Films ceased producing films after this project..
