= Maragadha Naanayam =

2017 Indian film by ARK Saravan

- Theatrical release poster
- Directed by: ARK Saravan
- Written by: ARK Saravan
- Produced by: G. Dillibabu
- Starring: Aadhi; Nikki Galrani
- Cinematography: P. V. Shankar
- Edited by: Prasanna GK
- Music by: Dhibu Ninan Thomas
- Production company: Axess Film Factory
- Release date: 16 June 2017
- Running time: 119 minutes
- Country: India
- Language: Tamil

Maragadha Naanayam (transl. Emerald Coin) is a 2017 Indian Tamil-language fantasy comedy film written and directed by ARK Saravan in his directorial debut. The film stars Aadhi and Nikki Galrani while Anandaraj, Munishkanth, Daniel Annie Pope, Mime Gopi, and Kota Srinivasa Rao play supporting roles. It follows two small-time smugglers who seek the eponymous medallion, rumoured to be cursed, but must evade a powerful gang leader.

Filming took place between May and August 2016. The music was composed by first-timer Dhibu Ninan Thomas with cinematography by PV Shankar and editing by Prasanna GK. The film was released on 16 June 2017 and became commercially successful. A sequel is in development.

== Plot ==
Senguttuvan and Elango are two small-time crooks who work for a local jewel smuggler named "Nochukuppam" Ramdoss. Senguttavan is attracted to a young woman, Chanakya, whom he sees every morning at the bus stop. However, he never manages to speak to her. Chanakya eventually gets married, but her husband does not treat her well and physically and verbally abuses her in public.

Meanwhile, a Chinese businessman comes to the city looking to acquire an antique emerald medallion named "Maragatha Naanayam". This stone was owned by an ancient king named Irumporai and is rumoured to be cursed; anyone who laid their hands on the stone died in a lorry accident, with the lorry rumoured to be driven by Irumporai's spirit. The businessman hires a contractor named John, who has connections with local gangs that could do the job. He offers ₹10,00,00,000 for the contract, but no one is willing to do the task as they fear the curse. Only Senguttavan, who is frustrated at the small-time work he is doing under Ramdoss, is interested in the offer as he wants to involve himself in something big and challenging. Elango convinces Senguttuvan to approach a local priest who could protect them from the curse. The priest hands Senguttavan and Elango a lemon, after which the ghosts of the 132 people killed by the curse are revealed to them. The priest tells them that if they are going to pursue the stone, they will need to seek the help of one of the ghosts.

Back home, Senguttuvan and Elango complete the ritual to summon one of the ghosts: Elango's uncle Chidambaram. Unfortunately, before the ghost appears, the duo is interrupted by the news that Ramdoss had died from a heart attack. During Ramdoss's burial, the lemon accidentally slips from Senguttavan's pocket and falls on Ramdoss's hand, as a result of which Chidambaram's ghost possesses Ramdoss's body and appears before Senguttavan and Elango the following morning, much to their shock. Chidambaram decides to use three recently deceased people and possess them with the ghosts of three other people killed by the curse to help Senguttavan and Elango in their mission. The first is an old beggar, Selvaraj, who died in his sleep alongside the road. The second is a man who got decapitated in a freak accident. The third happens to be Chanakya, who hanged herself, unable to handle the abuse she endured at the hands of her husband. Chidambaram successfully brings two of the ghosts to their new bodies, but one of them, a Tamil teacher, has trouble staying in Selvaraj's body and keeps jumping in and out of the corpse.

Senguttuvan, Elango, and the three ghosts, now in their borrowed bodies, pursue the emerald stone. Following an initial lead, they interrogate Pandurangan while posing as the henchmen of a powerful local gang leader, "Twinkle" Ramanathan. This leads them to recover an emerald medallion, which turns out to be a fake. However, their methods draw Ramanathan's attention. He previously rejected the idea of pursuing the stone, but changed his mind. After realising that they recovered a replica, the group continues to piece clues together. They find the man who made the fake, who is now on his deathbed. Before he dies, the man gives them clues to who ordered the fake medallion: a local doctor named Krishnan, who happens to be one of the men killed by the curse. They find his son, who is also a doctor, and kidnap him. Before they can get him to tell them where the original medallion is, they are caught by Ramanathan's henchmen and are taken to his torture chamber. They manage to escape the torturers and eventually find the original medallion.

Despite Chidambaram's warning, Senguttuvan and Elango touch the stone and are thereby cursed. They arrange for a meeting with John and the Chinese businessman for the exchange, but on the way, they are pursued by the mysterious driverless lorry, revealed by Chidambaram as the vehicle that killed them. John and the businessman are run over by the lorry and killed. Senguttuvan manages to elude the lorry initially and recover the suitcase full of money. They then run into the Tamil teacher, who is in Selvaraj's body. He tells them that they must return the stone to the King's grave to lift the curse. On the way to the gravesite, they are pursued by both the mystery lorry and Ramanathan's gang, who are hell-bent on taking the stone from them. The group manages to elude both and get to the gravesite. Before they can return the stone, Ramanathan's gang shows up. Senguttavan makes a deal with Ramanathan that after he places the stone in the King's grave, he can take it, to which he agrees. Senguttuvan and Elango place the stone in the grave and are therefore released from the curse. Ramanathan has one of his henchmen recover the stone.

Having completed the job, Senguttuvan and Elango bid goodbye to the four ghosts, who release themselves from the occupied bodies. The ghost occupying Chanakya's body allows an emotional Senguttavan to finally hear Chanakya's voice and a declaration of love from her. After Senguttavan and Elango bid a tearful farewell to Chidambaram, all four bodies are laid to rest.

During the credits, while Senguttavan and Elango are boarding a bus to return home, they bump into Ramanathan again, who is now on the run. He tells them that as his henchman had touched the stone, he and his gang were pursued by the mysterious lorry and his henchman was killed, while he barely managed to escape. However, a few minutes later, a pilgrim who had earlier encountered Ramanathan and his gang while they were in pursuit of Senguttavan, Elango, and the three ghosts returns the stone to him, thereby activating the curse on Ramanathan and the pilgrim.

== Cast ==
- Aadhi as Senguttuvan
- Nikki Galrani as Chanakaya, later put in Chidambaram's friend Mahendran's soul
- Anandaraj as "Twinkle" Ramanathan
- Munishkanth as "Nochukuppam" Ramdoss, later put in a new soul, namely Chidambaram / Thothalavayan
- Daniel Annie Pope as Elango
- M. S. Bhaskar as Pandurangan
- Mime Gopi as John
- Sangili Murugan as the homeless dead body, a panhandler, and Tamizh Aiyaa (ghost)
- Arunraja Kamaraj as the drunken dead body, later took Chidambaram's friend Nesamani's soul
- Brahmanandam as Pilot
- Kota Srinivasa Rao as Priest
- Muruganandham
- Gajaraj as Dr. Krishnan
- Blade Shankar as Krishnan's son
- Kaali Venkat as Chidambaram (Elango's uncle who is a ghost) and Mahendran (voice)
- Shanthi Mani as Ramdoss's mother
- K. Pooranesh
- Vetrivel Raja
- Madurai Mohan
- Hu Chin Cheung

== Production ==
In May 2016, Axess Film Factory announced that they were making a fantasy-adventure comedy film directed by newcomer Saravan, who had worked an associate director to Ramkumar during Mundasupatti (2014). Saravan initially approached G. V. Prakash Kumar to play the lead role but his unavailability to immediately start shoot prompted the makers to look for an alternative lead actor. Aadhi and Nikki Galrani were signed on to play the leading roles, marking their second collaboration after Yagavarayinum Naa Kaakka (2015). Principal photography commenced on 26 May 2016, and wrapped by 8 August.

== Music ==
The film's soundtrack was composed by first-timer Dhibu Ninan Thomas and the audio rights are with Think Music. The audio was released on 15 March 2017.

Track listing
No.	Title	Lyrics	Singers	Length
1.	"Karuppaadu"	Arunraja Kamaraj	Arunraja Kamaraj, Dhibu Ninan Thomas	3:58
2.	"Nee Kavithaigala"	GKB	Pradeep Kumar	4:36
3.	"Aasai"	Muthamil	Sharanya Gopinath	3:18
4.	"Kottai Aanda Arasan"	Muthamil	Arunraja Kamaraj	4:10
5.	"Usiredukkum Kootam"	GKB	Kapil	4:11
Total length:				20:13

== Release ==
Maragadha Naanayam was released in theatres on 16 June 2017, along with a Telugu-dubbed version Marakathamani. The film had its television premiere on 17 December that year on Zee Tamil.

== Reception ==
Baradwaj Rangan wrote for Film Companion, "The most welcome surprise in Maragatha Naanayam is that it isn’t just a collection of gags and scares, which is all this genre really needs". Vishal Menon of The Hindu called it a "mostly fun fantasy marred by a slow second half". Reviewing Marakathamani, Ch Sowmya Sruthi of The Times of India said, "With the right amount of comedy, speedy narration, gripping plot and well-defined characters, the film scores some good brownie points in the first half that will make you come back for the second. The music and background score too compliment the film's mood and pace".

== Sequel ==
In July 2023, Saravan announced a sequel titled Maragadha Naanayam 2. Filming in February 2026, and wrapped that October.
