= Zacharia Pothen Jeevichirippundu =

2017 Malayalam language film

- Movie poster
- Directed by: Ullas Unnikrishnan
- Written by: Manoj Nair
- Produced by: Mohammed Asif
- Starring: Manoj K Jayan; Poonam Bajwa
- Music by: Dhibu Ninan Thomas
- Release date: 3 November 2017
- Running time: 148 minutes
- Country: India
- Language: Malayalam

Zacharia Pothen Jeevichirippundu (transl. Zacharia Pothen is alive) is a 2017 Malayalam language crime thriller film produced by Rajesh Perumbalam. The film stars Manoj K Jayan and Poonam Bajwa in the lead roles along with Babu Antony and Lal. The films is directed by Ullas Unnikrishnan. The music is composed by Dhibu Ninan Thomas.

== Plot ==
The story starts in Zacharia Pothen's guest house in a hill station, where he lives happily with his wife Maria and their servant Chami. The guest house is very special for both of them as it is their favourite place to spend time. Zacharia is a retired army man. After many years, his army friend comes to enquire about Zacharia's death. At this time the only person inhabiting the guest house is Chami, and it is revealed that Zacharia, his wife, and a stranger were found murdered one night in the house.

Later, with the help of a videotape, Zacharia's friend finds out that Maria was cheating on Zacharia and the stranger found dead was her boyfriend. Zacharia had died by drinking the poison Maria gave him, and both Maria and her boyfriend had died by drinking the poison Zacharia gave them.

== Cast ==
- Manoj K. Jayan as Zacharia Pothen
- Poonam Bajwa as Maria
- Babu Antony as Chami
- Lal as Sachi
- Rahul Madhav as S.I Unnikrishnan
- Anjana Menon as Dr. Shabnam
- Jayan Cherthala as Fr. Louis

== Soundtrack ==
The music is composed by Dhibu Ninan Thomas in his Malayalam debut.

- "Vadathikkatte"- Shreya Ghoshal
- "Ee Neram"- Harichandran
- "Mele Nilavinte"- K. S. Chithra, Vijay Yesudas
- "Athirae"- Sharath Sasank
