= Tamil Nadu Engineering Admissions =

Centralised engineering admissions process in Tamil Nadu, India

Tamil Nadu Engineering Admissions (TNEA) is a centralised admissions process for undergraduate engineering programmes in the Indian state of Tamil Nadu. It is administered by the Directorate of Technical Education, Tamil Nadu, under the state's Higher Education Department. The process uses marks obtained in qualifying examinations to prepare a merit list and allocate seats through counselling at participating institutions.

TNEA is not a separate entrance examination. It provides a common application, ranking and seat-allocation process for eligible candidates seeking admission to courses covered by the state's centralised engineering admissions system. Participating institutions, available seats, eligibility requirements and counselling procedures are specified in the information brochure published for each admissions year.

== History ==
=== Introduction of the single-window system ===
Before the introduction of centralised counselling, students applied to engineering colleges individually, and college managements allocated seats. In 1997, Anna University introduced a single-window system for engineering admissions in Tamil Nadu. The system centralised the admissions process and enabled candidates to select courses and colleges according to their merit rank and the availability of seats.

The first single-window counselling process covered 56 engineering colleges. By 2008, the number of participating colleges had grown to 333.

=== Abolition of the common entrance test ===
The Tamil Nadu Admission in Professional Educational Institutions Act, 2006 (Tamil Nadu Act 3 of 2007), provided for admission to professional degree courses on the basis of marks in the qualifying examination. The legislation formed part of the state's move away from a separate common entrance test for professional-course admissions. For engineering admissions, the relevant qualifying-examination subjects include mathematics, physics and chemistry.

=== Transition to online counselling ===
The traditional single-window system required candidates to attend counselling in person to select an available course and college. In July 2017, the state government announced that engineering admissions counselling would move online from the 2018–2019 academic year. The change allowed candidates to register and select colleges remotely rather than travel to a central counselling venue.

Online registration and application submission for TNEA 2018 began in May that year. The process included online application submission, certificate verification and online choice filling. Facilitation centres were also planned to assist applicants.

The 2018 rank list and counselling schedule were published online, marking the transition to an online process for submitting preferences and receiving seat allotments.

== Admissions process ==
=== Eligibility ===
TNEA covers admission to first-year undergraduate engineering programmes, including Bachelor of Engineering (B.E.) and Bachelor of Technology (B.Tech.) courses specified in the annual admissions brochure. Applicants must satisfy the academic, nativity and other eligibility requirements applicable to their circumstances and the courses for which they apply.

=== Ranking ===
The merit list is prepared using marks obtained in the relevant subjects of the qualifying examination. For candidates following the academic stream, marks in mathematics, physics and chemistry are converted to a common total of 200: mathematics contributes up to 100 marks, while physics and chemistry contribute up to 50 marks each.

Marks obtained under different recognised examination boards are normalised according to the method specified in the admissions brochure, enabling candidates to be assessed on a common basis. The normalised marks are used to prepare the merit list, subject to the applicable eligibility requirements and admissions rules.

When candidates have equal merit scores, their relative ranking is determined using the prescribed tie-breaking procedure. The criteria are applied in sequence: percentage of marks in mathematics, percentage in physics, percentage in the optional subject, total marks in the qualifying examination, date of birth and the assigned random number. The candidate with the higher relevant marks is preferred at the corresponding stages; an older candidate is preferred at the date-of-birth stage, and the higher random number is used if the tie remains unresolved.

=== Registration and verification ===
Applicants register through the official TNEA website and submit their application details online. The process includes payment of the prescribed fee and submission of the required academic records and certificates. Depending on the candidate's circumstances, these may include qualifying-examination marksheets, community and nativity certificates, and documents required for special reservation or other applicable provisions.

The Directorate of Technical Education publishes the registration dates, document-submission instructions, rank-list publication date and counselling schedule for each admissions cycle. The schedule may also provide a period for correcting or verifying application details and submitting grievances after the rank list is published.

=== Counselling and seat allotment ===
Counselling is conducted online in multiple rounds. Eligible candidates participate according to their rank and the schedule published by the admissions authorities.

The counselling process includes stages for choice filling, allotment and confirmation. During choice filling, candidates submit their preferred colleges and courses from the available options. Seat allotment takes account of merit rank, submitted preferences, seat availability and the applicable reservation rules. The annual schedule specifies arrangements for general counselling and for special or supplementary rounds, where applicable.

TNEA covers seats included in its centralised admissions process, including eligible seats in government and government-aided engineering colleges, university departments and constituent colleges, and seats surrendered by participating self-financing institutions. Admissions to seats outside the centralised process, including management-quota seats at self-financing institutions, are governed by separate arrangements and the applicable rules.

== Reservation policies ==
TNEA applies the reservation policies and special admission provisions prescribed by the Government of Tamil Nadu. Community-based reservation categories include Backward Classes, Backward Class Muslims, Most Backward Classes and Denotified Communities, Scheduled Castes, Scheduled Caste Arunthathiyars and Scheduled Tribes, alongside the open competition category. The applicable percentages and procedures are detailed in the admissions brochure.

A 7.5% preferential allocation of seats is provided for eligible students who studied in government schools from classes 6 to 12, under state legislation introduced in 2021. Eligibility and the documents required to establish a candidate's government-school education are specified in the annual instructions. A separate online process is provided for candidates applying under this provision.

The process also provides for special reservation categories, including eligible persons with disabilities, children of ex-servicemen and sportspersons.

== Participation and seat allotment ==
The number of applicants, participating institutions and available seats varies between admissions years. Figures published during a counselling cycle may refer to different stages of allotment and different categories of seats.

In 2026, 74,658 of the 181,436 seats reported as available under academic general counselling had been filled after the second round, representing approximately 41.15% of those seats. At that stage, 167 colleges had filled fewer than 10% of their seats, while 23 colleges had received no allotments.

The choice-filling process allows candidates to select multiple combinations of colleges and courses. During the 2025 admissions cycle, one candidate entered 1,502 choices. Computer Science and related fields accounted for approximately 55% of filled engineering seats that year, while Electronics and Communication Engineering accounted for around 15%.

The 2026 counselling cycle also showed differences in seat occupancy between institutions and courses. Factors discussed in coverage of the admissions process included candidates' preferences for particular colleges and branches, differences between urban and rural institutions, and the availability of seats in less-preferred courses.

At the conclusion of general counselling in 2026, there were 144,295 filled seats and 55,480 vacant seats in its reported counselling pool, out of 199,775 seats. There were reports that 253,806 seats had been approved across 418 engineering colleges in Tamil Nadu; the approved-seat total and the counselling-pool total describe different scopes.

Supplementary counselling was conducted separately to fill remaining seats. From 3 to 7 September 2026, 8,985 candidates received seat allotments through the supplementary round, bringing the reported total across general and supplementary counselling to 153,280 allotments.

== See also ==
- Tamil Nadu Professional Courses Entrance Examination
- Engineering education in India
