= Bachelor (2021 film) =

2021 film by Sathish Selvakumar

- Theatrical release poster
- Directed by: Sathish Selvakumar
- Written by: Sathish Selvakumar
- Produced by: G. Dillibabu
- Starring: G. V. Prakash Kumar; Divyabharathi
- Cinematography: Theni Eswar
- Edited by: San Lokesh
- Music by: G. V. Prakash Kumar; Dhibu Ninan Thomas; Siddhu Kumar; A. H. Kaashif
- Production company: Axess Film Factory
- Distributed by: Sakthi Film Factory; SonyLIV
- Release date: 3 December 2021 (India)
- Running time: 176 minutes
- Country: India
- Language: Tamil

Bachelor is a 2021 Indian Tamil-language adult romantic courtroom drama film written and directed by debutant Sathish Selvakumar and produced by G. Dillibabu under the banner of Axess Film Factory. The film stars G. V. Prakash Kumar and debutante Divyabharathi.

The film received mixed reviews from critics, with praise for G. V. Prakash's and Divyabharathi's performances, the lead pair's chemistry, sound design, and music, but criticism for its lengthy duration (176 minutes) and the screenplay in the latter half. Despite the criticism, the film was successful at the box office.

It was released on 3 December 2021.

== Plot ==
A reckless and narcissistic 24-year-old man, nicknamed Darling, relocates from his rural home on the outskirts of Coimbatore to Bengaluru in search of employment. He moves into a shabby dormitory shared by his brother's friends, namely Bhagya a.k.a. "Bucks", Arun, Prem, Shyam, and a few others. His constant amateurism and incompetence in everyday activities create considerable exasperation among his roommates. Nevertheless, they help him secure a job at the IT firm where they work.

One evening, while running an errand, Darling's carelessness results in his friend Nimmi getting injured. While recuperating, Nimmi is visited by his girlfriend Rumi, whose existence had been kept secret from the former. As an apology, Nimmi invites Darling to their flat, where he is introduced to Subbulakshmi a.k.a. "Subbu", the couple's roommate. Instantly attracted to her, he attempts to befriend her. When Nimmi and Rumi decide to emigrate to Boston, Darling convinces them to let him stay with Subbu, albeit under certain conditions.

Initially, Subbu is annoyed by Darling's presence and repeatedly rejects his advances, but she gradually warms to him. Later, when she falls ill, Darling cares for her, and his actions impress her, eventually leading to a romantic relationship. Over the next six months, the two grow closer; however, Darling's arrogance often creates conflict between them. During a visit to Coimbatore for a family function, Subbu informs Darling that she is pregnant, much to his shock. While Subbu wishes to keep the child and start a family, Darling insists on an abortion, wanting to keep the relationship a secret from his family.

Their disagreement over the pregnancy leads to a heated argument, after which Subbu reluctantly agrees to an abortion. However, she changes her mind at the last moment and disappears, leaving Darling and his friends searching for her unsuccessfully. They later discover that she has approached her brother-in-law Rudran, an arrogant lawyer, seeking legal protection for her unborn child. Seeking revenge for a prior insult, Rudran fabricates a case claiming that Darling and Subbu are married and that she has been harassed by his family over dowry.

Based on these allegations, the police arrest Darling's mother, sister, and brother-in-law, leading them to disown him. In court, Darling's lawyer Manoj attempts to prove that Darling and Subbu were only friends; however, Rudran counters by presenting audio recordings of their intimate conversations. Enraged, Darling tries to force Subbu to withdraw the case, but fails. He then attempts to negotiate with Rudran, who refuses.

During subsequent hearings, Manoj exposes inconsistencies in Rudran's claims but confirms Subbu's pregnancy, keeping the case ongoing. As a last resort, Manoj suggests that Darling claim infertility to weaken the case, and he reluctantly agrees. After failed attempts to obtain a fake certificate, Darling undergoes a dubious treatment that renders him temporarily impotent, and he is legally declared infertile. With the case seemingly turning in his favour, Nimmi confronts Darling and criticises his irresponsibility, revealing that Subbu chose to keep the child because she loved him.

At the next hearing, Rudran requests a DNA test to revive the case; however, Subbu, disillusioned by the situation, decides to withdraw it. Meanwhile, Darling has a change of heart and asks for her forgiveness. Subbu refuses, stating that he does not deserve it, and walks away, leaving him devastated.

== Cast ==
- G. V. Prakash Kumar as Darling, Subbu's amateurish boyfriend
- Divyabharathi as Subbulakshmi a.k.a. "Subbu", Darling's girlfriend
- Munishkanth as Lanthus, Darling's uncle
- Bagavathi Perumal as Bhagya a.k.a. "Bucks", Darling's roommate and close friend
- Mysskin as Father, who renders Darling temporarily infertile (cameo appearance)
- Monica Chinnakotla as Rumi, Nimmi's girlfriend
- R. K. Vijay Murugan as Rudran, Subbu's arrogant brother-in-law and criminal lawyer
- Jayann as Shyam
- Muthu Prasad Shanmugasundharam as Bhagya
- Nakkalites Arun as Arun, Darling's close friend
- Nakkalites Dhanam as Dhanam, Darling's mother
- Brindha as Brindha, Darling's elder sister
- Victor Nirmal Felix as Nimmi, Darling's close friend
- Manoj Beads as Manoj, Darling's lawyer and defence counsel
- Kotravai as Helen, Subbu's best friend
- Prem Kumar as Prem
- Sasi Kumar as Sasi
- Kiran R as Darling's roommate
- Sriram Manivannan as Darling's roommate
- Sam Isaac as Darling's roommate
- Surya Veerarajan as Darling's roommate
- VJ Mubashir as Subbu's friend
- Mathuram as Subbu's elder sister
- Subash Selvam as Darling's roommate
- Tamizh as a police officer
- Prankster Rahul as a medical store employee
- TSR as a government doctor
- Navya Suji as Rudran's junior assistant
- Mrithula Srini as Subbu's friend
- Madhuri Watts as Subbu's friend
- Melvin Dennis as Subbu's colleague
- Karthik Gunasekaran as a doctor (cameo appearance)
- Shankar as Darling's elder brother

== Production ==
In September 2019, G. V. Prakash Kumar was cast in the film.

On 13 September 2019, the first look of the film, along with the cast line-up, was revealed.

Principal photography was completed in October 2020.

Although the teaser was released on 13 February 2021, the film's release was delayed due to the aftermath of the COVID-19 pandemic.

== Music ==
Bachelor

Soundtrack album by G. V. Prakash Kumar, Dhibu Ninan Thomas, Siddhu Kumar and A. H. Kaashif
- Released: 26 November 2021
- Recorded: 2021
- Genre: Film soundtrack
- Length: 21:56
- Language: Tamil
- Label: Think Music India

G. V. Prakash Kumar chronology
Thalaivii (2021)	Bachelor (2021)	Maaran (2022)

Official audio
- Bachelor – Full Album on YouTube

Dhibu Ninan Thomas chronology
Kousalya Krishnamurthy (2019)	Bachelor (2021)	Kombu Vatcha Singamda (2022)

Siddhu Kumar chronology
Trip (2021)	Bachelor (2021)	Anandham Vilayadum Veedu (2021)

A. H. Kaashif chronology
Pathinettam Padi (2019)	Bachelor (2021)	Ottu (2022)

The songs were composed by G. V. Prakash Kumar, Dhibu Ninan Thomas, Siddhu Kumar and A. H. Kaashif, while the background score was composed by Siddhu Kumar. The track "Life of Bachelor" is inspired by the song "Angamaly" from the Malayalam film Angamaly Diaries.

Track listing
No.	Title	Lyrics	Music	Singer(s)	Length
1.	"Life of Bachelor"	Asal Kolaar	A. H. Kaashif	Navakkarai Naveen Prabanjam, A. H. Kaashif, Asal Kolaar	2:34
2.	"Pachigalam Paravaigalam"	Navakkarai Naveen Prabanjam	G. V. Prakash Kumar	Navakkarai Naveen Prabanjam	3:33
3.	"Adiye"	GKB	Dhibu Ninan Thomas	Kapil Kapilan	4:32
4.	"Kavan"	Navakkarai Naveen Prabanjam	Santhosh Sivashanmugam and Sathish Selvakumar (arrangers)	Navakkarai Naveen Prabanjam	1:32
5.	"Kaadhal Kanmani"	Nithish	G. V. Prakash Kumar	G. V. Prakash Kumar, Swagatha S Krishnan	5:02
6.	"Maalai Nera Theneer Suvai"	Thamizhanangu	Siddhu Kumar	Lakshmikanthan	1:55
7.	"Miss You Baby"	Aishvarrya Suresh	G. V. Prakash Kumar	Aishvarrya Suresh	2:48
Total length:					21:56

== Reception ==
The film received mixed to positive reviews from critics, who praised the lead performances and music, but criticised the screenplay and excessive length.

M. Suganth of the Times of India gave the film three out of five stars and wrote that it "is an often fascinating, indulgent peek into the life of a deeply flawed character". He praised G. V. Prakash Kumar's performance, stating that "he does a pretty good job in capturing the obnoxiousness of this character". However, he criticised the writing and editing, noting that "both the writing and the editing give the feeling of requiring tighter focus". He also appreciated the use of handheld shots by cinematographer Theni Eswar, stating that they make the audience feel immersed in the characters' lives. He concluded that the ending felt "less impactful despite being a progressive one", as it focused more on the effect on surrounding characters rather than the protagonists.

A critic from Cinema Express noted that "perhaps the only really interesting portion in Bachelor is when matters of a court come into focus, and a domestic abuse case gets debated".

=== Accolades ===
Award (Note: Awards, festivals, and organisations are listed in alphabetical order.)	Date of ceremony (Note: Date is linked to the article about the awards held that year, wherever possible.)	Category	Recipient(s)	Result	Ref.
Edison Awards	12 March 2022	Best Female Rising Star	Divyabharathi	Won	
Techofes Awards	16 May 2022	Best Debut Actress	Divyabharathi	Won	
Radio City Awards	17 May 2022	Woman Entertainer of the Year – Cinema	Divyabharathi	Won	
Behindwoods Gold Medals	21 May 2022	Best Debut Actor – Female	Divyabharathi	Won	
She India Awards	28 May 2022	Sensational Star of the Year	Divyabharathi	Won	
10th South Indian International Movie Awards	11 September 2022	Best Debutant Director – Tamil	Sathish Selvakumar	Nominated	
10th South Indian International Movie Awards	11 September 2022	Best Playback Singer (Male) – Tamil	Kapil Kapilan	Won	
10th South Indian International Movie Awards	11 September 2022	Best Comedian – Tamil	Munishkanth	Nominated	
Ananda Vikatan Cinema Awards	6 April 2023	Best Playback Singer (Male)	Kapil Kapilan	Won	
