= Arunraja Kamaraj =

Indian singer, lyricist, actor, and film director

- Occupations: Actor, singer, lyricist, writer, director
- Years active: 2012–present
- Children: 2

Arunraja Kamaraj is an Indian singer, lyricist, actor and director in Tamil language films. He has acted in films such as Jigarthanda, Raja Rani, and Maan Karate. He wrote and sung the song "Ding Dong" for the movie Jigarthanda, "Neruppu Da" for Rajinikanth's film Kabali, and the title song for Trisha Illana Nayanthara.

== Personal life ==
Kamaraj was married to Sindhuja, who died of COVID-19 in 2021. They had two daughters together. Kamaraj remarried in late 2022.

== Filmography ==
=== As director and writer ===
Year	Film	Notes
2018	Kanaa	
2022	Nenjuku Needhi	
2023	Label	Hotstar Web series

=== As actor ===
Year	Film	Role	Notes
2013	Raja Rani	Udumbe	
2014	Maan Karate	Neruppu Kumar	
2016	Pencil	Selvam	
2016	Remo	Arun	Cameo appearance
2017	Maragadha Naanayam	Nesamani	
2017	Yaanum Theeyavan	Arun	
2018	Kaathiruppor Pattiyal	Kuttipuli	
2019	Natpuna Ennanu Theriyuma	Manikandan	
2020	Ka Pae Ranasingam	Gunasekhar	
2023	Japan	Himself	

== Discography ==
=== As lyricist ===
Year	Film	Song(s)	Notes
2012	Pizza	"Rathiri"	
2012	Pizza	"Engo Odugindrai"	
2013	Pizza II: Villa	"Boomiyil"	
2014	Jigarthanda	"Ding Dong"	
2015	Darling	"Vandha Mala"	
2015	Kaaki Sattai	"Im So Cool"	
2015	Kaaki Sattai	"Shake That"	
2015	Demonte Colony	"Dummy Piece-u", "Trap of the Beast"	
2015	Trisha Illana Nayanthara	"Trisha Illana"	
2016	Pokkiri Raja	"Taaru Taara"	
2016	Theri	"Dub Theri Step"	
2016	Theri	"Eena Meena Teeka"	Rap part of the song
2016	Kadhalum Kadandhu Pogum	"Pangali"	
2016	Sawaari	"Paani Poori"	
2016	Pencil	"Why Machi Why", "LED Kannala"	
2016	Kabali	"Neruppu Da"	
2016	Kodi	"Kodi Parakutha"	
2016	Wagah	"Aaniyae Pudunga Venandaa"	
2016	Enakku Innoru Per Irukku	"Myma"	
2017	Bairavaa	"Varlam Varlam Vaa"	
2017	Bruce Lee	"Naan Thaan Goppan Da"	
2017	Kavan	"Happy New Year"	
2017	Baloon	"Vaanam Dhaane"	
2017	Baloon	"Mazhai Megam"	
2017	Baloon	"Uyirile Uyirile"	
2017	Baloon	"Shutup Pannunga"	
2017	Shivalinga	"Chinna Kabali"	
2017	Nibunan	"Vaa Daa Modhi Paakalam"	
2018	Kaala	"Semma Weightu"	
2018	Kaala	"Thanga Sela"	
2018	Kaala	"Katravai Patravai"	
2018	Kanaa	"Kanne En Kannazhage"	
2018	Kanaa	"Othaiyadi Pathaiyila"	
2019	Sarvam Thaala Mayam	"Peter Beatu Yethu"	
2019	Sarvam Thaala Mayam	"Dingu Dongu"	
2019	Namma Veettu Pillai	"Jigiri Dosthu"	
2019	Namma Veettu Pillai	"Namma Veettu Pillai Theme"	
2019	Asuran	"Vaa Ezhundhuvaa"	
2019	Darbar	"Kannula Thimiru"	
2019	Gurkha	"Chowkidar"	
2020	Plan Panni Pannanum	"Plan Panni"	
2021	Master	"Kutti Story"	
2021	Dikkiloona	"Cycle Wheela Pola"	
2023	Jailer	"Kaavaalaa"	
2024	Captain Miller	"Rise of Miller"	
2025	Retro	"Love Detox"	
2026	Lucky the Superstar	"Happy Lucky Day Chellam"	
2026	Thaai Kizhavi	"Mattikittan Minorkunju"	
2026	Thaai Kizhavi	"Enga Vechi Podhachita"	
2026	Kara	"Vaaya Ey Karasaami"	
2026	Vishwanath & Sons	"Pattampoochi"	

=== Singles as lyricist ===
Year	Song	Album	Composer	Notes
2017	"Kombu Vacha Singam da"	Non-album single	G. V. Prakash Kumar	Independent single for Jallikattu
2024	"Chennai Formula 4 Racing – Theme Song"	Non-album single	Yuvan Shankar Raja	

=== As singer ===
Year	Film	Song(s)	Composer	Notes
2014	Jigarthanda	"Ding Dong"	Santhosh Narayanan	
2015	Demonte Colony	"Trap of the Beast"	Keba Jeremiah	
2015	Trisha Illana Nayanthara	"Trisha Illana Nayanthara"	G. V. Prakash Kumar	
2016	Kadhalum Kadandhu Pogum	"Pangaali"	Santhosh Narayanan	
2016	Theri	"Dub Theri Step"	G. V. Prakash Kumar	
2016	Kabali	"Neruppu Da"	Santhosh Narayanan	
2016	Kabali	"Nippu Raa"	Santhosh Narayanan	Telugu dubbed version
2016	Oru Mexican Aparatha	"Kalippu Katta Kalippu"	Manikandan Ayyappan	Malayalam film
2016	Kodi	"Kodi Parakutha"	Santhosh Narayanan	
2016	Bairavaa	"Varlam Varlam Vaa"	Santhosh Narayanan	
2017	Bruce Lee	"Naan Thaan Goppan Da"	G. V. Prakash Kumar	
2017	Balloon	"Shutup Pannunga"	Yuvan Shankar Raja	
2017	Shivalinga	"Chinna Kabali"	S. S. Thaman	
2017	Nibunan	"Vaa Daa Modhi Paakalam"	S. Navin	
2018	Kaala	"Katravai Patravai"	Santhosh Narayanan	
2018	Kaala	"Nikkal Nikkal"	Santhosh Narayanan	
2019	Asuran	"Vaa Ezhunduvaa"	G. V. Prakash Kumar	
2019	50/50	"Bin Laden (Theme)"	Dharan Kumar	
2019	Gurkha	"Chowkidar"	Raj Aryan	
2019	Bharathi Kannamma	"Bharathi Kadhaliyae Kannamaa"	Himself	Serial
2024	Captain Miller	"Rise of Miller"	G. V. Prakash Kumar	
2024	Laandhar	"Kaalam Kodiyadhe"	M. S. Prraveen	
2026	Thaai Kizhavi	"Enga Vechi Podhachita"	Nivas K. Prasanna	
2026	Kara	"Vaaya Ey Karasaami"	G. V. Prakash Kumar	lyrics by himself; co-sung with Anthony Daasan, Satyan, V. M. Mahalingam

== Other works ==
=== Television ===
Year	Name of Television Show	Role	Network
2024	Super Singer Season 10	Guest performer	Star Vijay

== Awards and recognitions ==
- BOFTA Galatta Debutant Awards 2019 - Best Debut Director (People Choice)
- Colors Tamil Galatta Nakshatra Awards 2019 - Online Musical Sensation
- JFW Movie Awards 2019 - Best Director for Kanaa
- Norway Tamil Film Festival Awards 2019 - Best Social Awareness Award for Kanaa (as director)
- Zee Cine Awards Tamil 2020 - Best Debut Director for Kanaa
