= List of Tamil films of 2014 =

This is a list of Tamil language films produced in the Tamil cinema in India that were released in 2014.

Post-amendment to the Tamil Nadu Entertainment Tax Act 1939 on 27 September 2011, gross jumped to 130 per cent of net for films with non-Tamil titles and U certificates as well. Commercial Taxes Department disclosed ₹82.97 crore in entertainment tax revenue for the year.

== Box office collection ==
The highest-grossing Kollywood films released in 2014, by worldwide box office gross revenue, are as follows.

Highest worldwide gross of 2014
Rank	Film	Production company	Distributor	Worldwide gross	References
1	athiK	Lyca Productions	Ayngaran International	₹120 crore	
2	Lingaa	Rockline Entertainments	Eros International	₹ 157crore	
3	Jilla	Super Good Films	Maxlab Entertainments	₹85 crore	
4	Veeram	Vijaya Productions	Vijaya Productions	₹80 crore	
5	Velaiilla Pattadhari	Wunderbar Films	Escape Artists Motion Pictures Wunderbar Films Kalasangham Films	₹75 crore	
6	Anjaan	Thirrupathi Brothers	UTV Motion Pictures	₹70 crore	
7	Kochadaiiyaan	Eros International; Media One Global Entertainment Cinemorphic	Eros International	₹30 crore	
9	Aranmanai	Sri Thenandal Films	Red Giant Movies	₹25 crore	
9	Maan Karate	Vision i Medias	AR Murugadoss Productions Escape Artists Motion Pictures	₹20 crore	

== Top film lists ==
=== Critics ===
The Hindu listed a list of their top 20 films in December 2014, revealing the following ventures "stood out": Appuchi Gramam, Arima Nambi, Burma, Goli Soda, Inam, Jeeva, Jigarthanda, Kathai Thiraikathai Vasanam Iyakkam, Madras, Nedunchaalai, Nerungi Vaa Muthamidathe, Oru Kanniyum Moonu Kalavaanikalum, Pisaasu, Poriyaalan, Saivam, Thegidi, Thirudan Police, Vaayai Moodi Pesavum, and Velaiyilla Pattathari.

Sify.com listed their pick of top 15 films in December 2014, "purely based on the content and quality of the films": Cuckoo, Goli Soda, Inam, Jeeva, Jigarthanda, Kaaviya Thalaivan, Kathai Thiraikathai Vasanam Iyakkam, Madras, Mundasupatti, Oru Kanniyum Moonu Kalavaanikalum, Pisaasu, Saivam, Sathuranga Vettai, Thegidi, and Vaayai Moodi Pesavum.

== Released films ==
=== January - June ===
Opening		Title	Director	Cast	Genre	Producer	Ref
J A N	3	Agadam	Mohamad Issack	Tamizh, Srini Iyer, Sri Priyanka, Baskar	Horror	Last Bench Boys Productions	
J A N	3	Athimalai Muthupandi	Raghupathi	Sarathi, Sopna, Maragatham, Manikkanan	Action	Krishnalaya Movies	
J A N	3	En Kadhal Pudhidhu	Maarishkumar	Ram Sathya, Umashree, Namitha Pramod, Pandiarajan	Romance	Veera Movies	
J A N	3	Kathiyai Theetathe Buthiyai Theetu	Srikrishna	Athava Ram, Priya, Manju	Drama	DSK Productions	
J A N	3	Mun Andhi Saaral	Devendiran	Ansar, Anand, Murali, Nakshatra	Romance	Focus Pictures	
J A N	3	Namma Gramam	Mohan Sharma	Nishan, Samvrutha Sunil, Nedumudi Venu, Sukumari	Drama	Gunachitra Movies	
J A N	10	Jilla	R. T. Neason	Mohanlal, Vijay, Kajal Aggarwal, Mahat, Niveda Thomas	Action-masala	Super Good Films	
J A N	10	Veeram	Siva	Ajith Kumar, Tamannaah, Vidharth, Bala, Pradeep Rawat	Action-masala	Vijaya Productions	
J A N	14	Kalavaram	Ramesh Selvan	Sathyaraj, Tanikella Bharani, Ajay Reddy, Yasir	Action	Rithish Harish Movies	
J A N	14	Vidiyum Varai Pesu	A. B. Mugan	Anith, Nanma, Vaidegi	Romance	A. M. Films Productions	
J A N	24	Goli Soda	Vijay Milton	Sree Raam, Kishore DS, Pandi, Murugesh	Drama	Thirrupathi Brothers	
J A N	24	Ner Ethir	M.Jaya Pradeep	Richard Rishi, Vidhya, Aiswarya, Parthy	Thriller	V. Creations	
J A N	24	Malini 22 Palayamkottai	Sripriya	Nithya Menen, Krish J. Sathaar	Drama-thriller	Rajkumar Theaters	
J A N	30	Inga Enna Solluthu	Vincent Selva	VTV Ganesh, Santhanam, Meera Jasmine	Comedy	VTV Productions	
J A N	30	Ninaithathu Yaaro	Vikraman	Rejith Menon, Nimisha Suresh, Karthik Yogi, Azar	Romance	Abhishek Films	
J A N	31	Maalai Nera Pookkal	K.J.S	Nagina, Kaviya, Jeni	Adult	Y Pictures	
J A N	31	Ninaivil Nindraval	Agasthiya Bharathi	Ashwin Sekhar, Keerthi Chawla, Gayathri Venkatagiri	Action	Sri Sabari Movies	
J A N	31	Rummy	Balakrishnan	Vijay Sethupathi, Aishwarya Rajesh, Inigo Prabhakaran, Gayathrie	Drama	JSK Film Corporation	
F E B	7	Kovalanin Kadhali	K. Arjunaraja	Dilip Kumar Salvadi, Kiranmai, Navneet Kapoo	Romance	Good Day Films	
F E B	7	Pannaiyarum Padminiyum	S. U. Arun Kumar	Vijay Sethupathi, Aishwarya Rajesh, Jayaprakash	Comedy-drama	Magicbox Films	
F E B	7	Pulivaal	G. Marimuthu	Vimal, Prasanna, Ananya, Iniya, Oviya	Thriller	Magic Frames	
F E B	7	Vu	Ashik	Thambi Ramiah, Varun, Madhan, Neha	Comedy	Phoenix Pictures	
F E B	14	Chandra	Roopa Iyer	Shriya Saran, Prem Kumar, Ganesh Venkatraman, Vivek	Fantasy-period	India Classic Arts & Narasimha Arts	
F E B	14	Idhu Kathirvelan Kadhal	S. R. Prabhakaran	Udhayanidhi Stalin, Nayantara, Chaya Singh	Romantic comedy	Red Giant Movies	
F E B	14	Madhavanum Malarvizhiyum	Masil	Ashwin Kumar, Sija Rose, Neeraja	Romance	Girija Productions	
F E B	14	Rettai Kathir	Ramkishore	Subbu, Sumitha, Pandiarajan	Romance	VNS Productions	
F E B	21	Aaha Kalyanam	Gokul	Nani, Vaani Kapoor	Romantic comedy	Yash Raj Films	
F E B	21	Bramman	Socrates	Sasikumar, Lavanya Tripathi, Santhanam	Masala	K Manju Cinemas	
F E B	21	Chithirai Thingal	R. Manikkam	Kieran, Swathi, Ashwin, Rekha	Romance	Mayura Silver Screens	
F E B	21	Manaivi Amaivathellam	K. Umachithra	Mohanraj, Rajeswari, Vinod Kumar, Subburaj	Drama	Sri Shanthai Durgai Amman Movies	
F E B	21	Nila Kaaikirathu	Prabhu	Senthil Raj, Nagama	Adult	Blue Whale International	
F E B	21	Venmegam	Ram-Laxman	Vidharth, Ishara Nair, Jayashree Sivadas	Drama	Sujatha Sunitha Combines	
F E B	28	Amara	M. Jeevan	Amaran, Sruthi Ramakrishnan, Ashish Vidyarthi	Action	TKM Films	
F E B	28	Panivizhum Malarvanam	P. James David	Abhilash, Sanyathara, Varsha Ashwathi	Action	CTN & Raymax Media	
F E B	28	Thegidi	Ramesh	Ashok Selvan, Janani Iyer	Thriller	Thirukumaran Entertainment	
F E B	28	Vallinam	Arivazhagan	Nakul, Mrudhula Basker, Atul Kulkarni	Sports drama	Aascar Films	
M A R	7	Endrendrum	Sinish	Sathish Krishnan, Priyanka Reddy	Romance	A NOD Production	
M A R	7	Ethir Veechu	K. Guna	Irfan, Rasna	Sports drama	Malik Streams Corporation	
M A R	7	Veeran Muthu Raaku	C. Raja Sekaran	Kathir, Liyasree, Aadukalam Naren	Drama	Kripathy Movies	
M A R	8	Nimirndhu Nil	Samuthirakani	Jayam Ravi, Amala Paul, Ragini Dwivedi, Sarathkumar	Action drama	Vasans Visual Ventures	
M A R	14	Adiyum Andamum	Kaushik	Ajay, Mitali Agarwal, Kavitha Srinivasan	Thriller	RSR Screens	
M A R	14	Kadhal Solla Aasai	Thamizh Seenu	Ashok, Wasna Ahmed, Madhu Raghuram	Romance	Emersigns Productions	
M A R	14	Marumugam	Kamal Subramaniam	Daniel Balaji, Preethi Das, Anoop Kumar	Thriller	Entertainment Unlimited	
M A R	14	Oru Modhal Oru Kadhal	Keerthi Kumar	Vivek Rajgopal, Megha Burman	Romantic comedy	Kandan Gear up Entertainment	
M A R	21	Cuckoo	Raju Murugan	Attakathi Dinesh, Malavika Nair	Romantic drama	Fox Star Studios	
M A R	21	Kerala Nattilam Pengaludane	S. S. Kumaran	Abi Saravanan, Gayathri, Abirami Suresh, Deekshitha Manikkam	Romantic comedy	Suma Pictures	
M A R	21	Pani Vizhum Nilavu	Kaushik	Hriday, Eden Kuriakosse	Romance	Vee Ess Pictures	
M A R	21	Virattu	Kumar T.	Sujiv, Erica Fernandes, Pragya Jaiswal	Thriller	Teja Cinemas	
M A R	21	Yasakhan	Duraivanan	Mahesh, Niranjana	Drama	Agaram Productions	
M A R	28	Inam	Santosh Sivan	Sugandha Ram, S. Karan, Saritha, Karunas	Drama	Santosh Sivan Films	
M A R	28	Marumunai	Mariesh Kumar	Maruthi, Mrudhula Bhaskar	Romance	MPL Films	
M A R	28	Nedunchaalai	N. Krishna	Aari, Sshivada, Prashant Narayanan	Drama	Fine Focus	
M A R	28	Oru Oorla	K. S. Vasanthakumar	Venkatesh, Neha Patil	Drama	Vignesh Productions	
A P R	4	Koottam	Jeevan Reddy	Naveen Chandra, Piaa Bajpai, Kishore	Drama	Mammoth Media	
A P R	4	Maan Karate	Thirukumaran	Sivakarthikeyan, Hansika Motwani, Vamsi Krishna	Fantasy	Escape Artists Motion Pictures, AR Murugadoss Productions	
A P R	4	Oru Kanniyum Moonu Kalavaanikalum	Chimbu Deven	Arulnithi, Bindu Madhavi, Ashrita Shetty	Comedy	Mohana Movies	
A P R	11	Aandava Kaapaathu	Lebin	Harish, Aleesha, Nizhalgal Ravi	Drama	LML Creations	
A P R	11	Kandharvan	Salangai Durai	Kadhir, Honey Rose, Ganja Karuppu	Romance	Thamarai Movies	
A P R	11	Naan Sigappu Manithan	Thiru	Vishal, Lakshmi Menon, Iniya	Thriller	UTV Motion Pictures; Vishal Film Factory	
A P R	14	Idhuvum Kadandhu Pogum	Anil Krishnan, Srihari Prabaharan	Shivaji Dev, Shilpa Bhatt, Anusha Varma, Ravi Raghavendra	Drama	AVM Productions	
A P R	18	Damaal Dumeel	Shree	Vaibhav, Remya Nambeesan	Thriller	Cameo Films	
A P R	18	Karpavai Katrapin	Patturam Senthil	Madhu Raghuram, Abinitha, Sandeep	Romance	Patturam Production	
A P R	18	Tenaliraman	Yuvaraj Dhayalan	Vadivelu, Meenakshi Dixit	Historical comedy/Satire	AGS Entertainment	
A P R	18	Thalaivan	Ramesh Selvan	Bas, Nikesha Patel, Santhanam	Action	Blue Ocean Pictures	
A P R	25	Ennamo Nadakkudhu	Rajapandi	Vijay Vasanth, Mahima Nambiar, Prabhu, Rahman	Thriller	Triple V Records	
A P R	25	Pongadi Neengalum Unga Kadhalum	Ramakrishnan	Ramakrishnan, Athmiya Rajan, Karunya Ram	Romance	Wisdom Pictures	
A P R	25	Vaayai Moodi Pesavum	Balaji Mohan	Dulquer Salman, Nazriya Nazim, Madhoo	Romantic comedy	YNOT Studios; Radiance Media	
A P R	25	Yennamo Yedho	Ravi Thiyagarajan	Gautham Karthik, Rakul Preet Singh, Nikesha Patel, Prabhu	Romantic comedy	Ravi Prasad Productions	
M A Y	1	Nee Enge En Anbe	Sekhar Kammula	Nayantara, Vaibhav, Pasupathy	Thriller	Endemol India	
M A Y	1	Dhavani Kaatru	VRP Manohar	Aaradhya, Murali, Ravikumar	Romance	Santhosh Studios	
M A Y	2	Nee En Uyire	Vikas Lathithraj	Navarasan, Vaishali	Romance	Sri Lakshmi Vrushadhri Productions	
M A Y	2	Eppothum Vendran	Siva Shanmugan	Sanjay, Sunu Lakshmi	Action	ARR Creations	
M A Y	9	Yaamirukka Bayamey	Deekay	Kreshna, Rupa Manjari, Oviya	Horror comedy	RS Infotainment	
M A Y	9	Angusam	Manukannan	Skanda Ashok, Jayati Guha	Action	Manusri Film International	
M A Y	10	Vallavanukku Pullum Aayudham	Srinath	Santhanam, Ashna Zaveri, Mirchi Senthil, Nagineedu	Action comedy	PVP Cinema, Handmade Films	
M A Y	16	Enn Nenjai Thottaye	R. K. Anbuselvan	Ravi Kumar, Pavithra	Romance	Guru Surya Movies	
M A Y	23	Kochadaiiyaan	Soundarya Rajinikanth	Rajinikanth, Deepika Padukone, Shobhana, Sarathkumar, Aadhi, Jackie Shroff, Nassar	Animation/ period	Eros International	
M A Y	30	Amma Ammamma	Balu Manivannan	Saranya, Sampath Raj, Anand	Drama	Chandrasekhar Thiraikalam	
M A Y	30	Adhu Vera Idhu Vera	M. Thilagarajan	Varshan, Sanyathara, Imman Annachi	Comedy	Jeni Powerful Media	
M A Y	30	Hogenakkal	Murthy M. R.	Thamizhvanan, Jothinanda, Sravya	Drama	Ezhil Productions	
M A Y	30	Poovarasam Peepee	Halitha Shameem	Gaurav Kalai, Pravin Kishore, Vasanth	Adventure	V Talkies, Baby Shoe Productions	
J U N	6	Athiyayam	R. Yuvan	Sharan Selvam, Ashmitha, Varsha, Pandi, Shankar Guru, Raja	Drama	Film Factory	
J U N	6	Manjapai	Naveen Raghavan	Vimal, Lakshmi Menon, Rajkiran	Comedy drama	Thirupathi Brothers	
J U N	6	Un Samayal Arayil	Prakash Raj	Prakash Raj, Sneha, Urvashi, Tejus, Samyuktha Hornad	Romance	Duet Movies	
J U N	13	Mundasupatti	Ram	Vishnu, Nandita Swetha	Comedy	Thirukumaran Entertainment	
J U N	13	Naan Than Bala	Kannan	Vivek, Swetha, Venkatraj	Drama	SSS Entertainments	
J U N	13	Ottam Aarambam	VST John	Zaheer, Ezhil	Action	TRY Creations	
J U N	13	Thirudu Pogatha Manasu	Chella Thangiah	Senthil Ganesh, Sai Aishwarya, Thangaiya	Romance	Ajantha Kalaikoodam	
J U N	13	Uyirukku Uyiraga	Manoj Kumar	Sanjeev, Sharran Kumar, Nandhana, Preethi Das	Drama	Motherland Movies	
J U N	13	Vazhum Deivam	Sundar	Anusha, Mohana, Charmila, Radharavi	Drama	SRP Films	
J U N	19	Vadacurry	Saravana Rajan	Jai, Swati Reddy, Kasthuri, RJ Balaji	Comedy thriller	Meeka Entertainment	
J U N	20	Netru Indru	Padmamagan	Vimal, Prasanna, Richard, Arundhathi, Manochitra	Adventure thriller	26699 Cinema	
J U N	20	Sooraiyadal	Thamara Kannan	Sribalaji, Leema Babu, Gayathri	Drama	Thrilok Productions	
J U N	20	Vetri Selvan	Rudhran	Ajmal, Radhika Apte, Mano	Drama	Silicon Studios	
J U N	27	Athithi	Bharathan	Nandha, Ananya, Nikesh Ram	Thriller	Spellbound Films	
J U N	27	Dhanush 5am Vaguppu	Kathaga Thirumalavan	Akhil, Ashrita, K. R. Vijaya	Drama	K V Productions	
J U N	27	Enna Satham Indha Neram	Guru Ramesh	Nithin Sathya, N. Puralavan, Raja, Maanu, Malavika Wales	Comedy thriller	A. V. A Productions	
J U N	27	Saivam	A. L. Vijay	Nassar, Baby Sara, Baasha, Twara Desai	Drama	Think Big Studios	

=== July - December ===
Opening		Title	Director	Cast	Genre	Production Studio	Ref
J U L	1	Eera Veyyil	A. K. Micheal	Aryan Rajesh, Saranya Nag	Romantic drama	AKM Film Production, Day Night Pictures	
J U L	4	Arima Nambi	Anand Shankar	Vikram Prabhu, Priya Anand	Thriller	V Creations	
J U L	11	Nalanum Nandhiniyum	Venkatesan	Michael Thangadurai, Nandita Swetha	Romance	Libra Productions	
J U L	11	Pappali	A. Govindamurthy	Senthil Kumar, Ishara Nair	Romantic comedy	Arasur Movies	
J U L	11	Ramanujan	Gnana Rajasekaran	Abhinay Vaddi, Bhama, Suhasini Maniratnam, Abbas, Sarath Babu	Biopic	Camphor Cinema	
J U L	11	Sooran	Balu Narayanan	Karan, Shipali Sharma, Anumol	Drama	Arowana Pictures	
J U L	18	Irukku Aana Illai	K. M. Saravanan	Vivanth, Eden Kuriakosse, Manisha Shree	Horror comedy	Varam Creations	
J U L	18	Sathuranga Vettai	H. Vinoth	Natty Subramaniam, Ishara Nair	Heist-comedy	Manobala's Picture House, SR Cinema	
J U L	18	Thalaikeezh	Rex Raj	Rakesh, Nanda, Thejamai	Erotic thriller	Maadha Creations	
J U L	18	Velaiilla Pattadhari	Velraj	Dhanush, Amala Paul, Vivek	Action-comedy	Wunderbar Films	
J U L	24	Thirumanam Enum Nikkah	Anees	Jai, Nazriya Nazim, Hebah Patel	Romance	Aascar Films	
J U L	25	Innarku Innarendru	Aandal Ramesh	Silambarasan, Anjana, Stephy	Romance	Elumalayin Movies	
A U G	1	Jigarthanda	Karthik Subbaraj	Siddharth, Lakshmi Menon, Bobby Simha	Mob	Five Star Films	
A U G	1	Muthal Manavan	Gopi Gandhi	Gopi Gandhi, Sanu, Iswarya, Ramya	Drama	RSG Pictures	
A U G	1	Sandiyar	Chozhadevan	Jagan, Kayal, Nayakam	Action	Uyirmei Productions	
A U G	1	Sarabham	Arun Mohan	Naveen Chandra, Salony Luthra, Aadukalam Naren	Thriller	Thirukumaran Entertainment	
A U G	8	Agnee	AJR Harikesava	AJR Harikesava, Kavin Shree	Romance	Sri Krishna Thiraikoodam	
A U G	8	Bharani	Mavanan	Raja Prabhu, Vijay Kathir, Leelakumar, Umashree	Drama	IRP Productions	
A U G	15	Anjaan	Lingusamy	Suriya, Samantha, Vidyut Jamwal, Manoj Bajpai	Action	UTV Motion Pictures	
A U G	15	Kathai Thiraikathai Vasanam Iyakkam	R. Parthiepan	Santhosh Prathap, Akhila Kishore, Sahithya Jagannathan	Drama	Reves Creations	
A U G	15	Snehavin Kadhalarkal	Muthuramalincoln	Advaitha, Ashwanth Thilak, Uday, Athif	Romance	Tamilan Kalaikkoodam	
A U G	22	Aindhaam Thalaimurai Sidha Vaidhiya Sigamani	Ravichandar	Bharath, Nandita Swetha, Karunakaran	Comedy	Rajam Productions	
A U G	22	Kabadam	Jyothimurugan	Sachin, Santhosh, Angana Roy	Drama	Chozha Creations	
A U G	29	Irumbu Kuthirai	Yuvaraj Bose	Atharvaa, Priya Anand, Raai Laxmi	Action	AGS Entertainment	
A U G	29	Kaadhal 2014	Sughandan	Harish, Neha, Manikandan, Appukutty	Romance	Saravana Film Makers	
A U G	29	Megha	Karthik Rishi	Ashwin Kakumanu, Srushti Dange, Angana Roy	Romance	GB Studios	
A U G	29	Puthiyathor Ulagam Seivom	Nithyanandam	Aajeedh, Anu, Yazhini, Santhosh, Pravin	Drama	Sri Teja Films	
A U G	29	Salim	N. V. Nirmal Kumar	Vijay Antony, Aksha Pardasany	Action drama	Studio 9 Production; Vijay Antony Film Corporation	
S E P	5	Amara Kaaviyam	Jeeva Shankar	Sathya, Miya	Romantic drama	The Show People	
S E P	5	Kadhalai Thavira Verondrum Illai	K. Selva Bharathy	Yuvan, Saranya Mohan	Romantic comedy	Sen Movies	
S E P	5	Kalla Saavi	Rajeswaran	Rajeswaran, Varsha	Adult	Siva Muruga Pictures	
S E P	5	Pattaya Kelappanum Pandiya	S. P. Rajkumar	Vidharth, Manisha Yadav	Comedy	Mutiara Films International	
S E P	5	Poriyaalan	Thanukumar	Harish Kalyan, Anandhi	Drama	A Grassroot Film Company	
S E P	5	Valiyudan Oru Kadhal	Sanjeevan	Kevin, Gowri Nambiar, Rajesh, Uma	Romance	Matha's Blessing Studios	
S E P	12	Burma	Dharanidharan	Michael Thangadurai, Reshmi Menon, Atul Kulkarni, Sampath Raj	Comedy thriller	Square Stone Films	
S E P	12	Sigaram Thodu	Gaurav	Vikram Prabhu, Monal Gajjar, Sathyaraj	Action	UTV Motion Pictures	
S E P	12	Vachikava	Rabi	Manickavel, Priyanka	Romance	Nalinaa Cine Circuit	
S E P	12	Vanavarayan Vallavarayan	Rajmohan	Kreshna, Makapa Anand, Monal Gajjar	Comedy drama	Mahalakhsmi Movies; Zero Rules Entertainment	
S E P	19	Aadama Jaichomada	Badri	Karunakaran, Bobby Simha, Vijayalakshmi	Comedy	B&C Films	
S E P	19	Aal	Anand Krishna	Vidharth, Hardika Shetty	Thriller	Shoundaryan Pictures	
S E P	19	Aranmanai	Sundar C	Sundar C, Vinay, Hansika Motwani, Andrea Jeremiah, Lakshmi Rai	Horror comedy	Vision Medias	
S E P	19	Maindhan	Kumaresan	Kumaresan, Shaila Nair, Hanuman, Geetha	Drama	CK Films	
S E P	19	Rettai Vaalu	Desika	Akhil, Saranya Nag	Drama	Pranav Productions	
S E P	19	Tamilselvanum 50KM Kalaiselviyum	P. Pandiyan	Rajesh, Kalai Anamika, Mahendran, Dilsha	Romance	Mayil Mass Media	
S E P	26	Ambel Jhoot	Divakar	Hashmitha Reddy, Libin	Action	Jaystar Productions	
S E P	26	Jeeva	Suseenthiran	Vishnu, Sri Divya, Soori	Sports drama	The Show People, The Next Big Film, Vennila Kabadi Team Productions	
S E P	26	Madras	Pa. Ranjith	Karthi, Catherine Tresa, Kalaiarasan	Drama	Studio Green	
S E P	26	Thalakonam	Padmaraj K.	Jithesh, Riya	Drama	SJS Productions	
O C T	2	Naan Ponnu Ondru Kanden	Sanjeev Srinivas	Ashwinraj, Vidarsha	Romance	Force Cinemas	
O C T	2	Theriyama Unna Kadhalichitten	K. Ramu	Vijay Vasanth, Rasna	Romance	Triple V Records	
O C T	2	Yaan	Ravi K. Chandran	Jiiva, Thulasi Nair	Action	R. S. Infotainment	
O C T	10	Aalamaram	S. N. Duraisingh	Hemanth Kumar, Avanthika Mohan	Horror	Peacock Motion Picture	
O C T	10	Gubeer	Thilip	Thilip, Ravi, Prabhu, Prathap	Comedy	Archer Cinemas	
O C T	10	Jamaai	M. Jayakumar	Naveen, Udhaya, Vaijayanthi, Nivisha	Romance	Classic Cine Circuit	
O C T	10	Kurai Ondrum Illai	Karthik Ravi	Geethan Britto, Haritha Parokod	Drama	Pathway Productions	
O C T	10	Muyal	Guhan	Murali, Saranya Nag, Shivani, Aishwarya	Drama	P&V Entertainment	
O C T	10	Nee Naan Nizhal	John Robinson	Arjun Lal, Ishitha, Sarath Kumar	Thriller	Sri Muthuramman Pictures	
O C T	10	Pulippu Inippu	Ranjith Bose	Mithun Tejasvi, Rishi Bhutani, Mansi, Gayatri	Comedy	Shilpa Motion Works	
O C T	10	Vennila Veedu	Vetri Mahalingam	Mirchi Senthil, Vijayalakshmi, Srinda Ashab	Family drama	Adharsh Studio	
O C T	10	Yaavum Vasappadum	Puthiyavan Rasiah	Vijith, Dilpikaa, Bala	Thriller	Nomad Team Ltd, AAA Productions	
O C T	22	Kaththi	AR Murugadoss	Vijay, Samantha, Neil Nitin Mukesh	Action thriller	Lyca Productions	
O C T	22	Poojai	Hari	Vishal, Shruti Haasan, Sathyaraj	Action-masala	Vendhar Movies, Vishal Film Factory	
O C T	31	Kadhalukku Kannillai	Jai Akash	Jai Akash, Nisha, Alisha Das	Romance	Jai Balaji Movie Makers	
O C T	31	Kalkandu	A. M. Nandakumar	Gajesh, Dimple Chopade, Akhil	Comedy	Rajarathnam Films	
O C T	31	Nerungi Vaa Muthamidathe	Lakshmy Ramakrishnan	Shabeer, Piaa Bajpai, Sruthi Hariharan	Road film	AVA Productions	
O C T	31	Sokku Sundaram	A. Sridhar	M.R., Soujanya	Comedy	M.R. Moviemakers	
N O V	7	Jaihind 2	Arjun	Arjun, Surveen Chawla, Simran Kapoor, Rahul Dev	Action	Sri Rama Films International	
N O V	7	Oru Oorla Rendu Raja	R. Kannan	Vimal, Priya Anand, Soori	Comedy	Kannan Pix	
N O V	7	Panduvam	Keaton	Melvin Siddhesh, Swasika	Action	GS Productions	
N O V	14	Appuchi Graamam	Vi Anand	Praveen Kumar, Anusha Naik, Suja Varunee, Swasika	Science fiction	Eye Catch Multimedia	
N O V	14	Anbendral Amma		Sangeetha	Drama		
N O V	14	Gnana Kirukkan	Ilayadevan	Jagaraj, Daniel Balaji, Archana Kavi, Sushmitha, Senthi Kumari	Drama	Thangammal Movie Makers	
N O V	14	Murugaatrupadai	K. Muruganandam	Saravana, Navika Kotia	Drama	Sigaram Visual Media	
N O V	14	Pulipaarvai	Praveen Gandhi	Sathya Dev	Drama	Vendhar Movies	
N O V	14	Thirudan Police	Caarthick Raju	Attakathi Dinesh, Aishwarya Rajesh, Nithin Sathya	Action comedy	Capital Film Works, Kenanya Films	
N O V	14	Vilaasam	Pa. Rajaganesan	Pawan, Sanam Shetty, Aadukalam Naren	Action	Sree Sanaa Films	
N O V	21	Chinnan Chiriya Vanna Paravai	Vijayan	Ashwin Kumar, Anu Krishna	Romance	NKP Productions	
N O V	21	Kaadu	Stalin Ramalingam	Vidharth, Samskruthy Shenoy, Samuthirakani	Drama	Chakravarthy Films International	
N O V	21	Naaigal Jaakirathai	Shakti Soundar Rajan	Sibiraj, Arundhati, Balaji Venugopal	Thriller	Nathambal Film Factory	
N O V	21	Vanmam	Jaikrishna	Vijay Sethupathi, Kreshna, Sunaina	Action drama	Nemichand Jhabak Productions	
N O V	21	Vizhi Moodi Yosithaal	K. G. Senthil Kumar	K. G. Senthil Kumar, Nikita	Sci-fi romantic thriller	Twister Films	
N O V	28	Aaaah	Hari-Hareesh	Gokulnath, Meghna, Bala Saravanan, Bobby Simha	Horror	KTVR Creative Frames, Shankar Bros	
N O V	28	Kaaviya Thalaivan	Vasanthabalan	Siddharth, Prithviraj, Vedhicka, Anaika Soti	Historical fiction	YNOT Studios, Radiance Media Group	
N O V	28	Mosakutty	M. Jeevan	Veera, Mahima Nambiar, Pasupathy	Romance	Shalom Studios	
N O V	28	Velmurugan Borewells	M. P. Gopi	Mahesh, Aarushi, Ganja Karuppu	Comedy	Tharun Kaanth Film Factory	
N O V	28	Vingyani	Paarthi	Paarthi, Meera Jasmine, Vivek, Sanjana Singh	Science-fiction thriller	Paarthis Pictures	
D E C	5	1 Pandhu 4 Run 1 Wicket	Veera	Vinay Krishna, Hashika, Lollu Sabha Jeeva	Horror	Rising Sun Films	
D E C	5	13 Am Pakkam Parkka	Pughazhmani	Ramji, Sri Priyanka, Rathan Mouli, Sriram Karthik	Horror	RVK Film Media	
D E C	5	Azhagiya Pandipuram	N. Rayan	Elango Nagarajah, Anjena Kirti	Romance	Thaimann Production	
D E C	5	Manam Konda Kadhal	Pugazhenthi Raj	Muthuram, Nofiya, Shriya	Romance	Rithish Harish Movies	
D E C	5	Naangellam Edagoodum	R. Vijayakumar	Manoj Devadas, Parvathi Suresh, Visakar Selvamani, Hensa	Drama	Kurundhudayar Production	
D E C	5	Pagadai Pagadai	Sasi Shanker	Dilip Kumar Salvadi, Divya Singh	Romance	Wisdom Films & VRDD Arts Films	
D E C	5	Ra	Prabu Yuvaraj	Ashraf, Aditi Chengappa	Fantasy thriller	Plan A Studios	
D E C	12	Innuma Nammala Namburanga	S. R. Balaji	Sudhagar, Thiruveni	Romance	Aniloops Production	
D E C	12	Lingaa	K. S. Ravikumar	Rajinikanth, Anushka Shetty, Sonakshi Sinha	Action	Rockline Entertainments	
D E C	12	Yaaro Oruvan	K. N. Baiju	Ram, Suresh Naran, Manavram, Alisha	Thriller	Navagraha Cine Arts	
D E C	19	Nadodi Paravai	T Vijaya Ragava Chakravarthi	Tharun, Sri Ragavi	Drama	Dhanam Pictures	
D E C	19	Natpin Nooram Naal	Raja Desingu	Vijaya Chiranjeevi, Saina	Crime thriller	Sree Vetrivel Film Academy	
D E C	19	Pisaasu	Mysskin	Naga, Prayaga Martin, Harish Uthaman	Horror	B Studios	
D E C	19	Sutrula	V. Rajesh	Richard, Mithun, Srija, Prajin, Ankitha, Sandra Amy	Thriller	Purple Vision	
D E C	25	Endrume Anandham	Vivekabarathi	Mahendran, Bharathi Kannan, Swetha	Drama	Narkavi Talkies	
D E C	25	Kappal	Karthik Krish	Vaibhav, Sonam Bajwa, Karunakaran	Comedy	S Pictures	
D E C	25	Kayal	Prabhu Solomon	Chandran, Anandhi, Vincent	Romantic	Escape Artists Motion Pictures	
D E C	25	Meaghamann	Magizh Thirumeni	Arya, Hansika Motwani, Sudhanshu Pandey	Action drama	Nemichand Jhabak Productions	
D E C	25	Nenjirukkumvarai Ninaivirukkum	S. O. Nabidass	Ishaq Hussaini, Livingston, Silpa Sivakumar	Romantic	Moon Star Creations	
D E C	25	Vellaikaara Durai	Ezhil	Vikram Prabhu, Sri Divya	Comedy	Gopuram Films	
D E C	26	Pesadha Padam	Aadhavan	Abirooban, Bharathi	Romance	Miracle Cinemas	

== Awards ==
Category/organization	Filmfare Awards South 26 June 2015	SIIMA Awards 6 August 2015	Tamil Nadu State Film Awards 14 July 2017	Vijay Awards 25 April 2015
Best Film	Kaththi	Kaththi	Kuttram Kadithal (2015)	Velaiyilla Pattathari
Best Director	AR Murugadoss; Kaththi	Pa. Ranjith; Madras	N. Ragavan; Manjapai	Karthik Subbaraj; Jigarthanda
Best Actor	Dhanush; Velaiyilla Pattathari	Dhanush; Velaiyilla Pattathari	Siddharth; Kaaviya Thalaivan	Dhanush; Velaiyilla Pattathari
Best Actress	Malavika Nair; Cuckoo	Hansika Motwani; Aranmanai	Aishwarya Rajesh; Kaaka Muttai (2015)	Amala Paul; Velaiyilla Pattathari
Best Music Director	Anirudh Ravichander; Velaiyilla Pattathari	Anirudh Ravichander; Velaiyilla Pattathari	A. R. Rahman; Kaaviya Thalaivan	Anirudh Ravichander; Velaiyilla Pattathari

== Dubbed films ==
Opening	Title	Director(s)	Original film		Cast	Ref.
Opening	Title	Director(s)	Film	Language	Cast	Ref.
22 August 2014	Thottal Vidathu	Ajit Ravi Pegasus	Ravu	Malyalam	Ajit Ravi Pegasus, Sanam Shetty, Nancy Gupta	

== Notable deaths ==
Month	Date	Name	Age	Profession	Notable films	Ref.
January	5	Uday Kiran	33	Actor	Poi • Pen Singam • Vambu Sandai	
January	5	Lakshmi Kantham	93	Actress	Alibabavum 40 Thirudargalum • Kaidhi Kannayiram • Velaikkari	
January	6	Thiruvarur Thangarasu	87	Dialogue writer	Ratha Kanneer	
January	13	Anjali Devi	86	Actress	Annai Oru Aalayam • Mannadhi Mannan • Urimai Kural	
January	22	Akkineni Nageswara Rao	91	Actor	Kaanal Neer • Kalyana Parisu	
February	13	Balu Mahendra	74	Director, cinematographer	Nellu • Mullum Malarum • Moondram Pirai • Veedu	
March	7	Lollu Sabha Balaji	43	Actor	Silambattam • Dindigul Sarathy	
April	18	Guru Dhanapal	55	Director	Unna Nenachen Pattu Padichen • Maaman Magal • Periya Manushan	
April	20	K. Prasad	53	Cinematographer	Padayappa • Virattu	
May	13	Jayalakshmi	82	Carnatic music vocalist, playback singer	Ezhai Padum Padu • Koondukkili • Kalyanam Panniyum Brammachari	
June	12	Kodukapuli Selvaraj	56	Actor	Annanagar Mudhal Theru • Aranmanai Kili	
June	14	Telangana Shakuntala	63	Actress	Dhool • Sivakasi	
June	22	Rama Narayanan	65	Director, producer	Ilamjodigal • Nageswari • Thirupathi Ezhumalai Venkatesa	
June	24	I. N. Murthy	89	Director	Atthai Magal • Kannan Varuvan • Delhi To Madras	
June	25	A. C. Murali Mohan	54	Actor	Alli Thandha Vaanam • Hey Ram • Minnale	
July	16	Kavi Kalidas	45	Director	Unnai Kodu Ennai Tharuven	
July	20	Kadhal Dhandapani	71	Actor	Kaadhal • Muni • Varuthapadatha Valibar Sangam	
August	7	Suruli Manohar		Actor	Padikathavan • Sura • Thoranai	
August	31	Bapu	80	Director	Neeti Devan Mayagugiran	
September	4	K. Mohan	89	Producer	Pasamalar	
October	22	Ashok Kumar	72	Cinematographer, director	Andru Peytha Mazhayil • Nenjathai Killathe • Johnny • Jeans	
October	23	S. S. Rajendran	86	Actor	Parasakthi • Sivagangai Seemai • Dum	
November	5	Mahadevan	42	Actor	Roja Kootam	
November	8	Meesai Murugesan	85	Actor	Aan Paavam • Poove Unakkaga • Pirivom Santhippom	
November	18	C. Rudhraiya	67	Director	Aval Appadithan • Gramathu Athiyayam	
December	12	Balakrishnan	84	Cinematographer	Sivandha Mann • Ethir Neechal • Iru Kodugal	
December	15	Chakri	40	Music director	Pillaiyar Theru Kadaisi Veedu	
December	23	K. Balachander	84	Director, producer, screenwriter	Apoorva Raagangal • Moondru Mudichu • Achamillai Achamillai • Thillu Mullu • Sindhu Bhairavi • Punnagai Mannan	
