= Vairamuthu filmography =

Vairamuthu is an Indian lyricist, poet, and novelist working in the Tamil film industry. A master's graduate from the Pachaiyappa's College in Chennai, he first worked as a translator, while also being a published poet. He entered the Tamil film industry in the year 1980, with the film Nizhalgal, an Ilaiyaraaja musical, directed by Bharathiraja. During the course of his 40-year film career, he has written over 7,500 songs and poems which have won him seven National Awards, the most for any Indian lyricist. He has also been honored with a Padma Shri, a Padma Bhushan and a Sahitya Akademi Award, for his abundant literary output.

Vairamuthu is known for his collaborations with A. R. Rahman. Their association has won four out of six National Awards for Rahman and four out of seven National Awards for Vairamuthu. He is also known for his collaborations with filmmaker Mani Ratnam.

== Filmography ==
=== Lyricist ===
Films

- 1980 Nizhalgal
- 1980 Kaali
- 1981 Alaigal Oivathillai
- 1981 Tik Tik Tik
- 1981 Raja Paarvai
- 1981 Vaa Intha Pakkam
- 1981 Andha 7 Naatkal
- 1981 Sivappu Malli
- 1982 Ninaivellam Nithya
- 1982 Kadhal Oviyam
- 1982 Puthu Kavithai
- 1982 Eera Vizhi Kaaviyangal
- 1982 Thooral Ninnu Pochchu
- 1982 Moondram Pirai
- 1983 Aanandha Kummi
- 1983 Salangai Oli (Tamil dubbed version)
- 1983 Mann Vasanai
- 1984 Nallavanukku Nallavan
- 1984 Naan Paadum Paadal - 2 songs
- 1984 Enakkul Oruvan
- 1984 Pudhumai Penn
- 1985 Thendrale Ennai Thodu
- 1985 Poi Mugangal
- 1985 Oru Kaidhiyin Diary
- 1985 Padikkadavan
- 1985 Poove Poochooda Vaa
- 1985 Idaya Kovil
- 1985 Mudhal Mariyathai
- 1985 Naan Sigappu Manithan
- 1985 Sindhu Bhairavi
- 1986 Neethana Antha Kuyil
- 1986 Kadalora Kavithaigal - 5 songs
- 1986 Vikram
- 1986 Punnagai Mannan
- 1986 Uyire Unakkaga - 4 songs
- 1986 Samsaram Adhu Minsaram
- 1986 Maaveeran
- 1987 Shankar Guru
- 1987 Vedham Pudhithu
- 1987 Chinna Thambi Periya Thambi
- 1987 Vilangu
- 1987 Manithan
- 1987 Paruva Ragam
- 1988 Padum Paravaigal (dubbed)
- 1988 Adhu Antha Kaalam
- 1988 Thaimel Aanai
- 1988 Kodi Parakuthu
- 1989 Raja Chinna Roja
- 1989 Sonthakkaran
- 1990 Idhaya Thamarai
- 1990 Jagathalaprathapan
- 1991 Sikaram
- 1992 Thalaivasal
- 1992 Roja
- 1992 Sevagan
- 1992 Annaamalai
- 1993 Captain Magal
- 1993 Pratap
- 1993 Thiruda Thiruda
- 1993 Vedan
- 1993 Kizhakku Cheemayile
- 1993 Gentleman
- 1993 Amaravathi
- 1993 Pudhiya Mugam
- 1994 Nattamai
- 1994 Mani Rathnam
- 1994 Jai Hind
- 1994 Pavithra
- 1994 Sindhu Nathi Poo
- 1994 Captain
- 1994 Raja Pandi
- 1994 Vandicholai Chinraasu
- 1994 Kaadhalan
- 1994 Duet
- 1994 Karuthamma
- 1994 May Madham
- 1994 Seevalaperi Pandi
- 1995 Basha
- 1995 Bombay
- 1995 Pasumpon
- 1995 Indira
- 1995 Aasai
- 1995 Karnaa
- 1995 Rangeela (dubbed version)
- 1995 Muthu
- 1996 Indian
- 1996 Panchalankurichi
- 1996 Love Birds
- 1996 Kaalam Maari Pochu
- 1996 Minsara Kanavu
- 1996 Mr. Romeo
- 1997 Ottam (Tamil dubbed version) - 2 songs
- 1997 Iruvar
- 1997 Arunachalam
- 1997 Gopura Deepam
- 1997 Ettupatti Rasa
- 1997 Bharathi Kannamma
- 1997 Love Today
- 1997 Once More
- 1997 Nerrukku Ner
- 1997 V.I.P
- 1997 Ratchagan
- 1997 Anthimanthaarai
- 1997 Porkkaalam
- 1998 Sandhippoma
- 1998 Kaadhal Mannan
- 1998 Thayin Manikodi
- 1998 Jeans
- 1998 Nilaave Vaa
- 1998 Uyire.. (Tamil version)
- 1998 Uyirodu Uyiraga
- 1998 Kannedhirey Thondrinal
- 1998 Unnudan
- 1999 Thullatha Manamum Thullum
- 1999 Poomagal Oorvalam
- 1999 Vaalee
- 1999 Rojavanam
- 1999 Amarkkalam
- 1999 Endrendrum Kadhal
- 1999 Kanave Kalaiyadhe
- 1999 Sangamam
- 1999 Thaalam (Tamil dubbed version)
- 1999 Mudhalvan
- 1999 Thullatha Manamum Thullum
- 1999 Jodi
- 1999 En Swasa Kaatre
- 1999 Padayappa
- 1999 Ethirum Pudhirum
- 1999 Iraniyan
- 1999 Vallarasu
- 1999 Aasaiyil Oru Kaditham
- 1999 Anantha Poongatre
- 1999 Hello
- 1999 Taj Mahal
- 2000 Alaipayuthey
- 2000 Kushi
- 2000 Sandhitha Velai
- 2000 Vetri Kodi Kattu
- 2000 Doubles
- 2000 Rhythm
- 2000 Good Luck
- 2000 Uyirile Kalanthathu
- 2000 Kandukondain Kandukondain
- 2000 Parthen Rasithen
- 2000 Snegithiye
- 2000 Vaanavil
- 2000 Pennin Manathai Thottu
- 2000 Appu
- 2000 Mugavaree
- 2000 Ennavalle
- 2001 Star
- 2001 Cittizen
- 2001 Pandavar Bhoomi
- 2001 Poovellam Un Vaasam
- 2001 Vedham
- 2001 Shahjahan
- 2001 12B
- 2001 Little John
- 2001 Paarthale Paravasam
- 2001 Majunu
- 2002 King
- 2002 Kannathil Muthamittal
- 2002 Thamizhan
- 2002 Baba
- 2002 Aalavandhan
- 2002 Alli Arjuna
- 2002 Red
- 2002 Thamizhan
- 2002 Virumbugiren
- 2002 Gemini
- 2002 Roja Kootam
- 2002 Panchathanthiram
- 2002 Samurai
- 2002 Youth
- 2002 Villain
- 2003 Anbe Sivam
- 2003 Iyarkai
- 2003 Aasai Aasaiyai
- 2003 Kadhal Sadugudu
- 2003 Jay Jay
- 2003 Sindhamal Sitharamal
- 2003 Anjaneya - 2 songs
- 2004 Arul
- 2004 New - 1 song
- 2004 Aaytha Ezhuthu
- 2004 Vasool Raja MBBS
- 2004 Chellamae
- 2004 Attagasam
- 2005 Mannin Maindhan
- 2005 Kana Kandaen
- 2005 Ullam Ketkumae
- 2005 Anniyan
- 2006 Thiruvilaiyaadal Aarambam
- 2006 Paramasivan
- 2006 Dishyum
- 2006 Thambi
- 2006 Varalaru
- 2006 Poi
- 2006 Guru (Tamil version)
- 2007 Sivaji
- 2007 Mozhi
- 2007 Pirappu
- 2008 Dasavathaaram
- 2008 Pournami
- 2008 Kannum Kannum
- 2008 Abhiyum Naanum
- 2009 Ayan - 1 song
- 2009 Irumbu Kottai Murattu Singam
- 2009 Peraanmai
- 2010 Moscowin Kaveri
- 2010 Sivappu Mazhai
- 2010 Raavanan
- 2010 Enthiran
- 2010 Thenmerku Paruvakaatru
- 2010 Aasal
- 2011 Thambi Vettothi Sundaram
- 2011 Vaagai Sooda Vaa
- 2012 Neerparavai
- 2012 Kadal
- 2012 Yamuna
- 2013 Ambikapathy (Tamil dubbed version)
- 2013 Vishwaroopam
- 2013 Paradesi
- 2013 Irandaam Ulagam
- 2013 Kutti Puli
- 2013 Ragalaipuram
- 2013 Pandiya Naadu
- 2013 Naveena Saraswathi Sabatham
- 2014 Jilla
- 2014 Panivizhum Malarvanam
- 2014 Kerala Nattilam Pengaludane
- 2014 Kochadaiiyaan
- 2014 Sathuranga Vettai
- 2014 Jeeva
- 2014 Lingaa
- 2014 Vellaikaara Durai
- 2015 Anegan
- 2015 Karma
- 2015 Agathinai
- 2015 Nannbenda - 1 song
- 2015 O Kadhal Kanmani
- 2015 Puli
- 2015 Paayum Puli
- 2015 Thoongaa Vanam - 1 song
- 2016 24
- 2016 Marudhu
- 2016 Wagah
- 2016 Dharmadurai
- 2017 Bairavaa
- 2017 Kaatru Veliyidai
- 2017 Anbanavan Asaradhavan Adangadhavan
- 2017 Sakka Podu Podu Raja
- 2018 Chekka Chivantha Vaanam
- 2018 Vishwaroopam II
- 2018 Kanne Kalaimaane
- 2019 Kaappaan
- 2020 Varmaa
- 2022 The Legend
- 2023 Otta (Malayalam film)
- 2024 Maharaja
- 2024 Kozhipannai Chelladurai
- 2026 Kadhal Reset Repeat

Television

- 1990 Rail Sneham
- 1991 Naanayam I
- 1995 Kaiyalavu Nesam
- 1997 Aachi International
- 1997 Nimmathi Ungal Choice I
- 1998 Velai
- 1998 Nimmathi Ungal Choice II — Kannammavin Kadhai
- 1998 Oru Pennin Kathai
- 1999 Chithi
- 1999 Kokila Enge Pogiraal
- 1999 Galatta Kudumbam I
- 1999 Sontham
- 1999 Nimmathi Ungal Choice III — Thriveni Sangamam
- 1999 Nimmathi Ungal Choice IV — Mavilai Thoranam
- 2000 Vaazhkkai
- 2000 Gopi
- 2000 Nimmathi Ungal Choice V — Manasatchi
- 2001 Vaazhnthu Kaattukiren
- 2001 Take It Easy Vaazhkai
- 2000 Nambikkai
- 2001 Kaveri
- 2001 Alaigal
- 2002 Aasai
- 2002 Annamalai
- 2002 Indira
- 2002 Metti Oli
- 2003 Parasuram
- 2004 Ahalya
- 2005 Aarthi
- 2005 Sruthi
- 2006 Bhandham
- 2006 Penn
- 2006 Anjali
- 2007 Vairanenjam
- 2007 Paasam
- 2007 Naanayam II
- 2008 Simran Thirai
- 2008 Savale Samali
- 2008 Gokulathil Seethai
- 2008 Samsaram
- 2009 Dhaayam
- 2009 Uravugal
- 2009 Aval Oru Minsaram
- 2009 Vilakku Vacha Nerathula
- 2010 Nadhaswaram
- 2010 Mundhanai Mudichu
- 2011 Uravukku Kai Koduppom
- 2011 Muthaaram
- 2012 Bommalattam
- 2012 Vairakkiyam
- 2012 Thyagam
- 2014 Mohini
- 2014 Kalyana Parisu
- 2017 Vidhi
- 2025 Padaiyaanda Maaveeraa

=== Dialogue writer ===
- Aanandha Kummi (1983)
- Natpu (1986)
- Odangal (1986)
- Raaga Devathai (1987)
- Vanna Kanavugal (1987)
- Thulasi (1987)
- Idhaya Geetham (1990)
- Vanakkam Vathiyare (1991)
- Captain (1994).

=== Onscreen appearances ===
- Adutha Veedu (1986) - guest role in song "Purushan Manaivi Uravuthan"
- Jodi (1999)

== List of songs ==
| Year | Film | Songs | Composer |
|---|---|---|---|
| 1980 | Nizhalgal | Idhu Oru Ponmaalai | Ilayaraja |
| 1980 | Kaali | Bhadrakalai Uttama | Ilayaraja |
| 1981 | Raja Paarvai | Andhi Mazhai | Ilayaraja |
| 1981 | Tik Tik Tik | Idhu Oru Nila, Poo Malarnthida | Ilayaraja |
| 1981 | Alaigal Oivathillai | Aayiram Thamarai, Dharisanam Kidaikatha, Vizhiyil Vizhundhu | Ilayaraja |
| 1982 | Vaalibame Vaa Vaa | Kanne Balam | Ilayaraja |
| 1982 | Kadhal Oviyam | Amma Azhage, Naatham En Jeevane, Poovil Vandu, Sangeetha Jaathi Mullai | Ilayaraja |
| 1983 | Mann Vasanai | Pothi Vecha | Ilayaraja |
| 1986 | Punnagai Mannan | all songs | Ilayaraja |
| 1991 | Nattukku Oru Nallavan | all songs | Hamsalekha |
| 1995 | Muthu | all songs | A. R. Rahman |
| 1998 | Jeans | all songs except "Columbus Columbus" | A. R. Rahman |
| 1999 | Sangamam | All songs | A. R. Rahman |
| 2002 | Kannathil Muthamittal | all songs | A. R. Rahman |
| 2020 | Nedunalvaadai | all songs | |
