= 181 (film) =

2022 Tamil language horror film

- Theatrical release poster
- Directed by: Mohamad Issack
- Produced by: P.B.S. Esa Ghugha
- Starring: Gemini Ryker; Rheena Krishnan; Kavya Amaira; Vijay Chandru
- Cinematography: Prasad
- Edited by: S. Devaraj
- Music by: Shameel J
- Production company: Sairaj Film Works
- Release date: 16 December 2022
- Country: India
- Language: Tamil

181 is a 2022 Indian Tamil-language horror film directed by Mohamad Issack and produced by BBS Isha Guha. The film stars Gemini Ryker, Rheena Krishnan, Kavya Amaira, and Vijay Chandru in the lead roles. The music was composed by Shameel J with cinematography by Prasad and editing by S. Devaraj. The film released on 16 December 2022.

== Cast ==
- Gemini Ryker
- Rheena Krishnan
- Kavya Amaira
- Vijay Chandru
- Suganya
- Gurr Aadharesh
- Yuva Thameem
- Jasmine
- Mahima
- RB Vijay
- Sarv G
- Sebastian
- Felix
- Venkatesh
- Mansoor

== Production ==
The film marked Mohamad Issack's fourth project after the horror films Agadam (2014), Seesa (2016) and Nagesh Thiraiyarangam (2018). Shot throughout 2021, the film was promoted as a record-breaking venture for having a screenplay that was written in 12 hours.

== Reception ==
The film was released on 16 December 2022 across Tamil Nadu. A critic from Maalai Malar gave the film 2.25 out of 5 stars, and labelled the film "low on thrills". A reviewer from Dina Thanthi also gave the film an unfavourable review. Film critic Malini Mannath wrote "while the director’s interest in setting up records is understandable, it would do him good if he concentrated more on the quality of his product by crafting a screenplay in a way more interesting and appealing to his audience."
