= List of accolades received by Velaiilla Pattadhari =

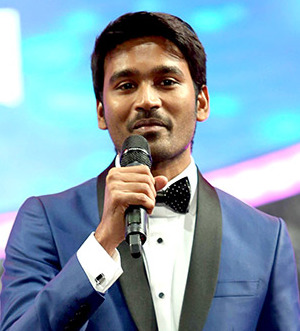
- Dhanush's performance in Velaiilla Pattadhari garnered him several awards and nominations.
Accolades
Award	Won	Nominated
Ananda Vikatan Cinema Awards	2	2
Edison Awards	2	2
Filmfare Awards South	2	6
Norway Tamil Film Festival Awards	0	2
South Indian International Movie Awards	7	11
Tamil Nadu State Film Awards	1	1
Vijay Awards	5	7
- Total number of awards and nominations (Note: Awards in certain categories do not have prior nominations and only winners are announced by the jury. For simplification and to avoid errors, each award in this list has been presumed to have had a prior nomination.)
Totals	19	31
- References

Velaiilla Pattadhari (transl. Unemployed graduate) is a 2014 Indian Tamil-language comedy drama film written and filmed by Velraj while also making his directorial debut. The film featured Dhanush, who produced the film under his production company Wunderbar Films, and Amala Paul in the lead roles. Saranya Ponvannan, Samuthirakani, Vivek, Surbhi and Amitash Pradhan played supporting roles. The film's story focuses on Raghuvaran (Dhanush), a civil engineering graduate who is unemployed for four years, and his search for a job. As soon as he finds employment, he faces competition from Arun Subramaniam (Amitash), the head of a rival engineering company, for a government project contract. The rest of the film shows how Raghuvaran overcomes the obstacles set by Arun. The soundtrack and score were composed by Anirudh Ravichander while the editing was handled by M. V. Rajesh Kumar.

Produced on a budget of ₹80 million, (Note: The average exchange rate in 2014 was 63.469 Indian rupees (₹) per 1 US dollar (US$).) Velaiilla Pattadhari was released on 18 July 2014 and received positive reviews. It was commercially successful, grossing ₹530 million worldwide. The film won 19 awards from 31 nominations; its direction, performances of the cast members and music have received the most attention from award groups.

At the 62nd Filmfare Awards South, Velaiilla Pattadhari was nominated in seven categories, winning Best Actor (Dhanush) and Best Music Director (Ravichander). At the 9th Vijay Awards, it received seven nominations and won five awards, Best Film, Best Actor, Best Actress, Best Music Director, and Favourite Song. It garnered eleven nominations at the 4th South Indian International Movie Awards ceremony and won seven awards, including Best Actor, Best Actor in a Supporting Role (Female) for Saranya, Best Comedian for Vivek and Best Debutant Director for Velraj. Among other wins, the film received two Ananda Vikatan Cinema Awards and Edison Awards each. It also received two nominations for Best Actor and Best Supporting Actress for Dhanush and Saranya respectively at the Norway Tamil Film Festival Awards, winning none. The film won Velraj the Best Dialogue Writer at the Tamil Nadu State Film Awards.

== Awards and nominations ==
Award	Date of ceremony (Note: Date is linked to the article about the awards held that year, wherever possible.)	Category	Recipient(s)/Nominee(s)	Result	Ref(s)
Ananda Vikatan Cinema Awards	8 January 2015	Best Actor	Dhanush	Won	
Ananda Vikatan Cinema Awards	8 January 2015	Best Supporting Actress	Saranya Ponvannan	Won	
Edison Awards	15 February 2015	Best Actor	Dhanush	Won	
Edison Awards	15 February 2015	Best Debut Director	Velraj	Won	
Filmfare Awards South	26 June 2015	Best Film – Tamil	Dhanush	Nominated	
Filmfare Awards South	26 June 2015	Best Director – Tamil	Velraj	Nominated	
Filmfare Awards South	26 June 2015	Best Actor – Tamil	Dhanush	Won	
Filmfare Awards South	26 June 2015	Best Actress – Tamil	Amala Paul	Nominated	
Filmfare Awards South	26 June 2015	Best Supporting Actor – Tamil	Samuthirakani	Nominated	
Filmfare Awards South	26 June 2015	Best Supporting Actress – Tamil	Saranya Ponvannan	Nominated	
Filmfare Awards South	26 June 2015	Best Music Director – Tamil	Anirudh Ravichander	Won	
Norway Tamil Film Festival Awards	23–26 April 2015	Best Actor	Dhanush	Nominated	
Norway Tamil Film Festival Awards	23–26 April 2015	Best Supporting Actress	Saranya Ponvannan	Nominated	
South Indian International Movie Awards	6–7 August 2015	Best Film – Tamil	Wunderbar Films	Nominated	
South Indian International Movie Awards	6–7 August 2015	Best Actor – Tamil	Dhanush	Won	
South Indian International Movie Awards	6–7 August 2015	Best Actress – Tamil	Amala Paul	Nominated	
South Indian International Movie Awards	6–7 August 2015	Best Actor in a Supporting Role (Female) – Tamil	Saranya Ponvannan	Won	
South Indian International Movie Awards	6–7 August 2015	Best Comedian – Tamil	Vivek	Won	
South Indian International Movie Awards	6–7 August 2015	Best Debutant Director – Tamil	Velraj	Won	
South Indian International Movie Awards	6–7 August 2015	Best Dance Choreographer – Tamil	Baba Bhaskar for "What a Karuvad"	Nominated	
South Indian International Movie Awards	6–7 August 2015	Best Lyricist – Tamil	Dhanush for "Amma Amma"	Won	
South Indian International Movie Awards	6–7 August 2015	Best Playback Singer (Male) – Tamil	Dhanush for "Amma Amma"	Nominated	
South Indian International Movie Awards	6–7 August 2015	Best Actress (Critics) – Tamil	Amala Paul	Won	
South Indian International Movie Awards	6–7 August 2015	Most Streamed Song – Tamil	Vela Illa Pattadhaari	Won	
Tamil Nadu State Film Awards	13 July 2017	Best Dialogue Writer	Velraj	Won	
Vijay Awards	25 April 2015	Best Film	Wunderbar Films	Won	
Vijay Awards	25 April 2015	Best Actor	Dhanush	Won	
Vijay Awards	25 April 2015	Best Actress	Amala Paul	Won	
Vijay Awards	25 April 2015	Best Music Director	Anirudh Ravichander	Won	
Vijay Awards	25 April 2015	Favourite Song	"Amma Amma"	Won	
Vijay Awards	25 April 2015	Favourite Film	Wunderbar Films	Nominated	
Vijay Awards	25 April 2015	Favourite Hero	Dhanush	Nominated	

== See also ==
- List of Tamil films of 2014
