= Sharanya Srinivas =

Indian vocalist (born 1991)

Sharanya
- Born: 3 January 1991 (age 35)
- Genre: Film Music
- Occupations: Playback singer
- Instruments: Vocalist
- Years active: 2000-current
- Spouse: Narayanan Kumar

Sharanya Srinivas (born 3 January 1991) is an Indian vocalist who has notably worked in Tamil films as a playback singer. She is the daughter of prominent singer Srinivas.

== Career ==
She then went on to complete her secondary education and chose to make a career in music, expressing interest in becoming a vocalist. Sharanya also subsequently underwent a music production course under Henry Kuruvila after doing the same in another course at A. R. Rahmans KM Music Conservatory. She received positive reviews for her song alongside K. J. Yesudas, with a reviewer from The Hindu noting she had a "sweet voice". Her first song in Tamil as an adult was from Phani Kalyan's album Konjam Koffee Konjam Kaadhal (2012), performing song titled "Adi Thaahira" alongside Sathya Prakash. She then performed in the Tamil version of Raanjhanaa for A. R. Rahman again, singing two Carnatic songs, "Kalaarasiga" and "Kanaave Kanaave", describing the first song as "close to her heart".

== Discography ==
Year	Song	Film	Language(s)	Music director
2000	"Alangatti Mazhai"	Thenali	Tamil	A. R. Rahman
2011	"Chirakingu"	The Train	Malayalam	Srinivas
2011	"Naavoru"	The Train	Malayalam	Srinivas
2012	"Adi Thaahira"	Konjam Koffee Konjam Kaadhal	Tamil	Phani Kalyan
2013	"Kalaarasiga"	Ambikapathy	Tamil	A. R. Rahman
2013	"Kanaave Kanaave"	Ambikapathy	Tamil	A. R. Rahman
2013	"Electro Love"	Kangaroo	Tamil	Srinivas
2013	"Nenjukkuzhi"	Kangaroo	Tamil	Srinivas
2014	"Endro Oru Vithaiyaai"	Panthu	Tamil	Nandha
2014	"Poovil Paniththuliyum"	Panthu	Tamil	Nandha
2015	Kannaaley	Single ft. Javed Ali	Tamil	ER Azhar Kaashif
2016	Leguvaa	Raja Manthiri	Tamil	Justin Prabhakaran
2017	Mersal Arasan	Mersal	Tamil	A. R. Rahman
2019	Kaatrae Kaatrae	July Kaatril	Tamil	Joshua Sridhar
2019	Anbin Vazhi	Nenjamundu Nermaiyundu Odu Raja	Tamil	Shabir
2021	Seemanthapoo	99 Songs	A. R. Rahman	
2021	Little Little	Atrangi Re	A. R. Rahman	Tamil
2022	Vidiyal Thedum	Ethirneechal (TV series)	Tamil	Srinivas
2024	Vidiyal Thedum	Ethirneechal Thodargirathu (TV series)	Tamil	Srinivas

== Personal life ==
She is married to Narayanan Kumar.
