= Nagesh Thiraiyarangam =

- Directed by: Mohamad Issack
- Written by: Mohammad Issack
- Produced by: Rajendra M. Rajan; Punitha Rajan
- Starring: Aari Arujunan; Ashna Zaveri; Masoom Shankar
- Cinematography: E. J. Nauzad
- Edited by: S. Devaraj
- Music by: Srikanth Deva
- Production companies: Transindia Media & Entertainment Private Limited
- Release date: February 16, 2018
- Country: India
- Language: Tamil

Nagesh Thiraiyarangam (transl. Nagesh Theatre) is a 2018 Indian Tamil-language horror film produced by Rajendra M. Rajan and Punitha Rajan for Transindia Media & Entertainment Private Limited and directed by Mohamad Issack. The film stars Aari Arujunan, Ashna Zaveri and Masoom Shankar, while Latha, Sithara, Kaali Venkat, Abhilash, and Athulya Ravi play important roles. The film was released across Tamil Nadu on 16 February 2018.

== Plot ==
Nagesh alias Naga is an honest yet unsuccessful real estate broker who lives with his mother, younger brother, and sister, Lakshmi, who is deaf and mute. Naga meets a girl named Himaja, and they fall in love. Things go fine for Naga and his family until there comes a situation where he has to sell his ancestral property - a dilapidated movie theater - to conduct Lakshmi's wedding. Naga and his friend Kaala travel to another town to sell the theater. Due to a small accommodation problem, they end up spending the night at the theater itself.

Over the next few days of their stay, both Naga and Kaala experience several paranormal activities around them, and all their attempts to bring prospective buyers go futile. Naga also starts having weird dreams every night in which random people are murdered. He then wakes up to the news to find that those people are dead in real life. Confused and frustrated, he seeks help from different godmen to find out what is wrong, but nothing works out. Meanwhile, a local politician realises that the people being murdered mysteriously are none other than his henchmen and his close associates. He finds that there is something abnormal about all these murders and consults with a Nambudiri, who tells that a malevolent spirit from the theater is causing all this mayhem and that they have to perform an exorcism. Paranormal occurrences keep happening around Naga, and he discovers that the spirit tries to take him to a well inside the premises. Himaja also tells him about her own paranormal vision of a murder and how she felt an apparition near her while she was on video chat with Naga and he had slept off. She is not able to positively identify, since she had closed her eyes out of fear, but since Naga had recorded the video chat, he watches it, only to find that it was he who appeared in the video and realizes that he is the one behind all those murders and hence the dreams. Naga soon prepares himself to face the spirit directly and asks for answers when the spirit reveals itself to be a woman and an old acquaintance to Naga.

Tamilselvi is a social activist who is popular on Facebook for her brutally honest articles about the wrongdoings in the society. She lives with Dr. Shakunthala, who runs a small orphanage with a few children and provides free medical services to the underprivileged. Naga was the real estate broker who helped them find a house. It so happens that a bigger orphanage lends a helping hand to Shakunthala, with the promise of taking a few kids from her orphanage and providing better education and a future. She and Tamilselvi entrust an early teen girl to them and send her off but soon receive a call from her that she and many other children have been kept hostage in a bungalow. Tamilselvi gets a ride from Naga and sets out to investigate and rescue the kids. She is horrified to find that the politician is making a deal with a foreign corporate company for exporting unlimited human blood for them to extract the blood plasma and use it for various cosmetic purposes, thereby commercializing it. The politician is making use of the orphan children's blood to achieve this target, and the local police officer is his aide. The girl from Shakunthala's orphanage is raped by the police officer, all of her blood is drawn by doctors for the plasma, and she is then killed. Tamilselvi records all of this and tries to escape with Naga's help. Naga is oblivious to all the danger that she might be in and just drops her home, but she is captured and attacked by the politician's henchmen at the abandoned theater, where they throw her alive in a well and fed to the catfishes thrown by the politician in the well.

All the evidences that Tamilselvi collected for Facebook are destroyed, and Shakunthala is killed. Tamilselvi's spirit has been waiting for revenge since then, and when she realizes that Naga is back in the theater, she makes use of his tiny paper cut wound to possess him through blood contact, and that is how she had murdered all those men who helped the politician. Meanwhile, the politician and the Nambudiri perform an exorcism at the theater, and it is here that Naga is dismayed to learn that his brother is also a part of the politician's team as a doctor that draws all the blood. A fight ensues, and a possessed Naga tries to kill his brother and the politician but is subdued by the Nambudiri's mantras. Tamilselvi is enraged and ultimately uses blood contact again with Naga's brother's bleeding wound and possesses him instead. She makes him throw the politician into the same well and later makes him kill himself by jumping in it. Now that she is avenged, Tamiselvi's spirit leaves the theater. Naga sells the theater successfully and gets his sister married.

== Cast ==
- Aari Arujunan as Nagesh
- Ashna Zaveri as Himaja Priya
- Masoom Shankar as Tamilselvi
- Kaali Venkat as Kaala
- Latha as Dr. Sakuntala
- Sithara as Nagesh's mother
- Abhilash as Sakthi, Nagesh's younger brother
- Athulya Ravi as Lakshmi
- Manobala as Priya's father
- Chitra Lakshmanan as Book shop owner
- Ramachandran Durairaj as Bar Owner
- Madhan Bob
- Anil Murali
- Florent Pereira
- Swaminathan
- Muthuraman
- Siva Balan
- Risha
- P. V. Chandramouli
- Robert in an item number
- Sonam Singh in an item number

== Production ==
Issack, who had earlier worked on Agadam, was fascinated by the legacy of Nagesh Theatre which was later converted into a marriage hall. He weaved the Theatre along with a story of a real estate agent getting suffocated in the real estate business into a potential script, and Transindia Media & Entertainment Private Limited decided to produce the project. Sri was signed as the music director while M. S. Prabhu and S. Devaraj were signed as cinematographer and editor respectively. Umadevi was signed as one among the lyricists of the film, along with Thamarai, Murugan Manthiram and newcomer Jagan Set.

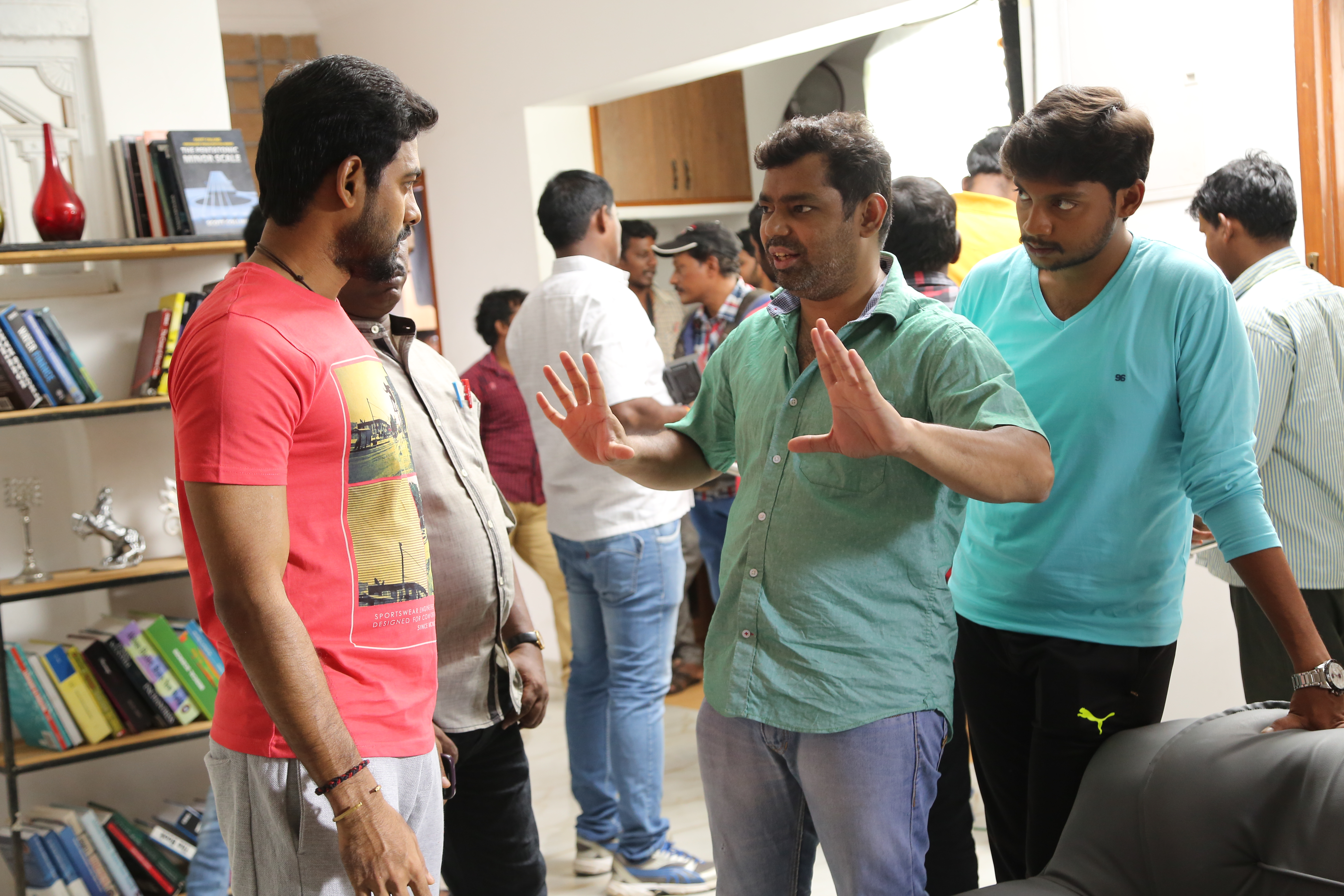
Issack directing Aari in a scene

Aari Arujunan was cast as the leading man along with comedian Kaali Venkat. Actors Bharath, Aadhi and Kalaiyarasan were also considered for the lead role, before Aari was finalised. Actress Ashna Zaveri was signed to play the leading lady, after the team had earlier considered either Pranitha Subhash or Nikki Galrani for the same role. Veteran actress Latha was also signed to play a pivotal role. Mumbai model Masoom Shankar was selected to make her debut in Tamil cinema with the film, while former lead actress Sithara was also added to the team. Veteran actress Bhanupriya had earlier been also considered for the role signed by Sithara. Chitra Lakshmanan, Lollu Sabha Swaminathan, Rams, Madhan Bob, Risha and Muthuraman were also signed to play important roles. Choreographer Roberts and actress Sonam Singh were signed to perform a dance sequence. Malayalam actor Anil Murali, Abhilash and Florent Pereira are also doing important roles.

The principal photography of the film started from October 6, 2016, after the photosession of the film that happened a month before. A lengthy schedule started from February 3, 2017, at Tindivanam that lasted for three weeks. Lead actor Aari's mother expired on 24 February, but he stayed to complete his entire portion as it was the final day of schedule before leaving to Pazhani for his mother's funeral. The film's first look poster was released by Tamil film directors Ameer and Karu Pazhaniappan on lead actor Aari's birthday, and the teaser of the film was released by actor Rajinikanth on 30 March 2017.

== Title controversy ==
On June 30, 2017, actor Anand Babu filed a case in the Chennai High Court against the makers of the film seeking a ban as they did not obtain permission to use the name of his father, actor Nagesh, in the title. Nagesh had also built and run the Nagesh Theater at T. Nagar. The judges accepted the case and ordered notice to be sent to producer, director and Vishal, the chief of Tamil Film Producers Council. The plea of Anand Babu was later rejected by Madras High Court as Justice C. V. Karthikeyan permitted the producers to go ahead with the Tamil title but restrained them from using the actor name Nagesh either independently or as Nagesh Theatre.

Anand Babu again filed a petition in the Madras High Court during February 2018 to stop the film from hitting the screens on the scheduled date. Since the judge found nothing objectionable nor misleading of Nagesh or Nagesh Theatre, the permission was given by court to release the film as per plan, but with the following conditions: the production company was asked to deposit 20 Lakhs in the Court, a slide carrying a message that the film has no connections with Nagesh or Nagesh Theatre had to be inserted before the title card, and such a message was to be attached or placed in all the newspaper advertisements for the film.

== Soundtrack ==
Nagesh Thiraiyarangam

Film score by Srikanth Deva
- Released: 2018
- Genre: Feature film soundtrack
- Length: 15:28
- Label: SS Music Audio

Srikanth Deva chronology
Bongu (2017)	Nagesh Thiraiyarangam (2018)	Nethraa (2018)

The songs are sung by Jagadeesh Kumar, Shashaa Tirupati, Anitha Karthikeyan, Gana Bala, Jithesh, Chinmayi and actress Remya Nambeesan for the music composed by Srikanth Deva for the lyrics of Thamarai, Umadevi, Murugan Manthiram and Jegan Set. The audio rights was acquired by SS Music Audio, an offshoot of the music television channel SS Music. The songs were released on February 2 at Suryan FM 93.5 station. Director Pa. Ranjith released the lyrical video of the song Unga Appakitta Pesala....

Track listing
No.	Title	Lyrics	Singer(s)	Length
1.	"Kangal Rendum"	Thamarai	Jagadeesh Kumar, Shashaa Tirupati	4:42
2.	"Vaadi Vaadi"	Murugan Manthiram	Gana Bala, Anitha Karthikeyan	4:02
3.	"Unga Appakitta Pesala"	Jegan Set	Jithesh, Remya Nambeesan	3:45
4.	"Kadhal Nilaithane"	Umadevi	Chinmayi	3:46

== Release ==
Tamil Nadu theatrical rights of the film were valued at ₹2 crore.
