= Kangaroo (2015 film) =

2015 Indian film by Samy

- Poster
- Directed by: Samy
- Written by: Samy
- Produced by: Suresh Kamatchi; S. Ravichandran
- Starring: Ranjith Velayudhan (Arjuna); Varsha Ashwathi; Sri Priyanka
- Cinematography: Raja Rathinam
- Edited by: Mani
- Music by: Srinivas
- Production company: V House Productions
- Release date: 24 April 2015
- Country: India
- Language: Tamil

Kangaroo is a 2015 Indian Tamil language action thriller film written and directed by Samy. The film stars newcomers Arjuna, Varsha Ashwathi and Sri Priyanka in the lead roles, while Thambi Ramaiah, Ganja Karuppu, and Kalabhavan Mani play supporting roles. The music was composed by singer Srinivas, and the film was released on 24 April 2015.

== Plot ==
Murugesan, aged about 10, brings his infant sister to Kodaikanal, where a provision store owner Thakapan Swami Nadar (Thambi Ramiah), takes pity on the kids and gives them a place to stay. A grown Murugesan (Arjuna) is a tea stall owner who looks every bit a ruffian, talks little, does not show any emotions, has animalistic behaviour, displays carnivorous eating habits, and drinks arrack in litres. The one person who is the world to him is his sister Azhagu (Sri Priyanka), on whom he dotes so much that people around call him Kangaroo. There is also Chellam (Varsha Ashwathi), a friend of Azhagu who loves Murugesan. The villain group consists of Ticket (Kalabhavan Mani), who wants to push Chellam into the flesh trade with the help of her sister, who is already in it, and a jeep driver who lusts for Azhagu. Murugesan bashes the two men for disturbing his sister and her friend, and an enmity ensues. Murugesan discovers that his sister is in love with another jeep driver Mani and arranges for the marriage between the two, much to the jealousy of Ticket and his friend. Just before the marriage, Mani falls from a cliff and dies. After a few months, Murugesan convinces Azhagu to marry again and fixes a groom, but this groom dies from electrocution. The sibling duo moves to another town where she gets married, but an attempt on the husband too is made, injuring him severely, and the unknown killer is ready to try again at the hospital. What happens to the brother and sister and who kills off every suitor of Azhagu forms the rest of the screenplay.

== Cast ==
- Ranjith Velayudhan (Arjuna) as Murugesan (Kangaroo)
- Varsha Ashwathi as Chellam
- Sri Priyanka as Azhagu
- Thambi Ramiah as Thakapan Swami Nadar
- Ganja Karuppu as Kangaroo's friend
- Kalabhavan Mani as Ticket
- R. Sundarrajan as Sattai
- Ghajini as the police inspector
- Director Saamy as Police
- K.P. Jagan as Manigandan

== Production ==
Production for the film began in April 2013, with the director Samy revealing that Kangaroo would be a film dedicated to caring mothers and stated that it was a family friendly film, marking a change from the controversial themes of his previous three projects.

== Soundtrack ==
The songs are composed by Srinivas, with his daughter Sharanya Srinivas singing two songs from the film. A. R. Rahman was the chief guest for the release of the film's audio soundtrack in December 2013. Vairamuthu wrote lyrics for the film and stated that despite working on a small budget film, his efforts towards the project were similar to that of his grander ventures.

- "Penjaka" – Shweta Mohan
- "Nenjukkuzhi" – Haricharan, Sharanya Srinivas
- "Thaayum Konja Kaalam" – Hariharasudhan
- "Ozhakku Nilave" – Bibin Tuttu
- "Yaarukku Yaar" – Srinivas
- "Nenjukkuzhi" – Vijay Prakash, Sharanya Srinivas

== Reception ==
Sify wrote "To conclude, comparing to Samy's earlier ventures, Kangaroo is a better, family-friendly movie but in general perspective, it‘s a middling one!". Anupama Subramanian of Deccan Chronicle wrote "The plot seems interesting, but the way it unfolds in 80s style with mushy melodrama and insipid comedy, the pace suffers during the first half. However, post interval the momentum picks up with few unexpected twists and turns."
