= Ashna Zaveri =

Indian actress

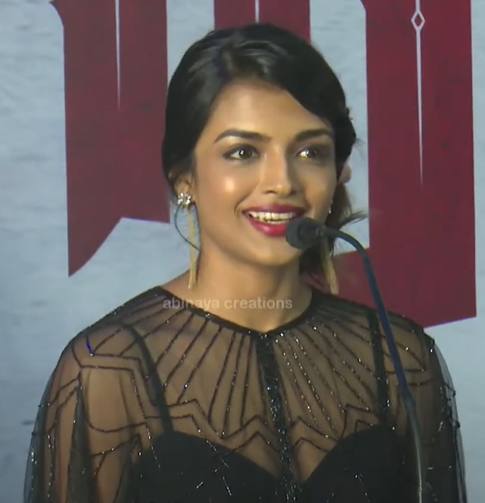
- Occupations: Actress, model
- Years active: 2014–present

Ashna Zaveri is an Indian actress and model who works in Tamil films.

== Career ==
Zaveri was initially a model based in Mumbai. She made her film debut with Vallavanukku Pullum Aayudham (2014), which was a success. Regarding her performance, a critic stated that she did not have much to do in the film, but delivered a decent performance. She starred with Santhanam again in Inimey Ippadithan the following year. For her role in Inimey Ippadithan, Zaveri practiced Tamil to master the language. Then, she acted in the fantasy films Meen Kuzhambum Mann Paanaiyum (2016) and Brahma.com (2017). She was seen in the horror film Nagesh Thiraiyarangam (2018) and the adult comedy Evanukku Engeyo Matcham Irukku (2018). She signed a film titled Kannitheevu (2023) with an all-girls cast. She appeared in the series MY3 (2023), which was released on Disney+ Hotstar. In 2026, Ashna Zaveri appeared in the mystery thriller films Thiraivi and Valluvan.

== Filmography ==
List of Ashna Zaveri film credits
Year	Film	Role	Notes
2014	Vallavanukku Pullum Aayudham	Vaanathi	
2015	Inimey Ippadithan	Maha	
2016	Meen Kuzhambum Mann Paanaiyum	Pavithra	
2017	Brahma.com	Manisha	
2018	Nagesh Thiraiyarangam	Himaja Priya	
2018	Evanukku Engeyo Matcham Irukku	Surekha	
2023	Kannitheevu	Kani	
2023	MY3	Thara	Disney+ Hotstar
2026	Thiraivi	Adhithi	
2026	Valluvan		
2026	Titanic	Shruthi	
