= Angali Pangali =

2016 Indian film by S. Balamurugan

- Directed by: S. Balamurugan
- Written by: Rangan
- Produced by: Puspavathi Subramaniam; Pasupathi Subramaniam; Siva Prakash Kandavello; Mannan; Teo Michael Ganesh
- Starring: Vishnupriyan; Sanyathara; Soori
- Cinematography: U. K. Senthil Kumar
- Edited by: N. Vasanth; N. Ayappan
- Music by: Srikanth Deva
- Production company: Sri Subra Yoga Jeeva Ltd
- Release date: 17 June 2016
- Country: India
- Language: Tamil

Angali Pangali (transl. Mother's and father's relatives) is a 2016 Indian Tamil-language romantic comedy film directed by S. Balamurugan. The film stars Vishnupriyan, Sanyathara and Soori, and was released on 17 June 2016.

== Cast ==
- Vishnupriyan as Karthik
- Sanyathara as Ilakiya
- Soori as Chandra
- Delhi Ganesh as Ilakiya's father
- Meera Krishnan as Ilakiya's mother
- Andipatti Vellapandian Thevar as Karthik's father
- Anjali Devi as Karthik's mother
- Visalini as Amudha, Karthik's sister
- Jyothi
- Jennifer
- Kottachi
- Gerald
- Dindigul Alex
- Madurai Velmurugan
- Baby Vinitha
- Pandian

== Production ==
The film is produced by Malaysian Tamils. The film was initially titled Ellam Neeyaanai in 2013 and Ramakrishnan was supposed to play the lead role but he left the film to work on his own directorial. The title was changed to Angali Pangali during the post-production phase. However, the film went through a two-year delay before having a theatrical release during June 2016.

== Soundtrack ==
The music composed by Srikanth Deva. The film's producers held an audio launch event during May 2014 to release the film's soundtrack with Kalaippuli S. Thanu and Suresh Krissna as chief guests.

No.	Song	Singers	Lyrics
1	Amma Endra Sol	Srikanth Deva	Annamalai
2	Hey Pattampoochi	Chinmayi	Annamalai
3	Indru Mudhalai	Aalap Raju	Kattalai Jaya
4	Kutti Chandran	Srikanth Deva, Jayashri, Kovai Murali, Anbarasi	Annamalai
5	Kutti Kutti Sathan	Mukesh, Reshmi	Annamalai
6	Nee Nee Neeyanai	Haricharan, Mahathi	Annamalai

== Reception ==
A critic from Maalai Malar wrote that the film was "low on affection".
