= Kannitheevu =

2023 Indian Tamil-language film

- Official poster
- Directed by: Sundar Balu
- Starring: Varalaxmi Sarathkumar; Subiksha Krishnan; Aishwarya Dutta; Ashna Zaveri
- Music by: R. S. Raj Prathap
- Country of origin: India
- Original language: Tamil

Production
- Producer: Sundar Balu
- Cinematography: Chitti Babu.K
- Editor: Lawrence Kishore
- Production company: Krithika Production

Original release
- Network: Colors Tamil
- Release: 8 March 2023

Kannitheevu (transl. Virgo Island) is a 2023 Indian Tamil-language female buddy drama film directed and produced by Sundar Balu. The film stars Varalaxmi Sarathkumar, Subiksha Krishnan, Aishwarya Dutta and Ashna Zaveri in the lead roles, with Rajendran, Super Subbarayan and J. Livingston in supporting roles. The film was released on 8 March 2023, coinciding with International Women's Day, in a direct television premiere via Colors Tamil.

Prior to release, the film was described as a "rare female friendship film" in Tamil cinema.

== Cast ==
- Varalaxmi Sarathkumar as Madhi
- Subiksha Krishnan as Subiksha
- Aishwarya Dutta as Aishwarya
- Ashna Zaveri as Kani
- Indraneil Varma
- Rajkumar
- Krishna Reddy
- Super Subbarayan
- Aadukalam Naren as Kani's father
- Rajendran
- J. Livingston
- Raja Ravindra
- Prudhvi Raj
- Sana
- Vishnupriya
- Praveen as Manoj
- Shaking Seshu as Doctor
- Lollu Sabha Maaran as Selvam
- Lollu Sabha Seshu

== Production ==
Production on the film began by January 2019, with Sundar Balu announcing that he would direct and produce his second feature film, after his first project Garjanai became delayed. Featuring an ensemble cast of actresses Varalaxmi Sarathkumar, Aishwarya Dutta, Ashna Zaveri and Subiksha Krishnan in the lead role, Balu noted it was a story focussing on four women, who are long-time friends, living in a housing board residence in North Chennai and eventually clashing with corrupt politicians. In early 2019, a fight scene involving a crocodile was conceptualised by stunt director Stun Siva.

As a result of the pandemic, the pace of the production and slowed and scenes were eventually finished in 2020 and 2021. Several scenes from the film featuring Telugu actors were shot in Telugu. A teaser for the film was released in September 2021, with a soundtrack release function taking place in May 2022.

== Soundtrack ==
Soundtrack was composed by R. S. Rajprathap.

- Poradi Vaa - R. S. Rajprathap, Subiksha, Aishwarya Dutta
- Yedhedho Ninaivugale - Supraja Sriram
- Yaar Yaar - Sharanya Gopinath

== Release ==
After remaining unreleased for several years, the film was selected by Colors Tamil for a direct television premiere on 8 March 2023, coinciding with International Women's Day. Director Sundar Balu said noted that he was "thrilled that Kannitheevu would reach the audience directly at their home with the premiere".
