= Oruvar Meethu Iruvar Sainthu =

2013 Indian film by Balasekaran

- Directed by: Balasekaran
- Starring: K. Bhagyaraj; Laguparan; Swathy; Sanyathara
- Cinematography: Vijayagopal
- Music by: Shiva
- Release date: 26 April 2013
- Country: India
- Language: Tamil

Oruvar Meethu Iruvar Sainthu (transl. Two lie on one) is a 2013 Indian Tamil-language romantic drama film directed by Balasekaran. Laguparan and Swathy, who previously collaborated in Raattinam (2012), star in the lead along with Sanyathara and K. Bhagyaraj.

== Cast ==
- K. Bhagyaraj
- Laguparan as Ganeshan
- Swathy as Savita
- Sanyathara as Kavita
- Visu as Judge
- Santhana Bharathi
- Chinni Jayanth
- Raj Kapoor as Police officer
- Madhan Bob as Priest
- Pandu
- Bava Lakshmanan
- Singampuli
- Master Bharath as Ganeshan's friend
- Chutti Aravind as Aravind
- Arjunan as Kavitha's husband
- Halwa Vasu
- Scissor Manohar
- Ganeshkar
- Aarthi as Savita's friend
- Paravai Muniyamma as Ganeshan's grandmother
- Cool Suresh (uncredited)

== Release ==
A critic from The New Indian Express stated that "What’s catchy about the film is its title, apt for the story. If only the script was better crafted". A critic from The Times of India gave the film a rating of one out of five stars and stated that "The movie is far from promising and every song, comedy track and fight just gives us briefs intervals to step out of the hall". A critic from Maalai Malar praised the unique storyline, songs, and cinematography. Critics from Dinakaran and Dinamalar criticized the old story.
