= Peraanmai =

2009 film by S. P. Jhananathan

- Theatrical release poster
- Directed by: S. P. Jhananathan
- Screenplay by: N. Kalyanakrishnan
- Story by: S. P. Jhananathan
- Dialogues by: S. P. Jhananathan
- Produced by: K. Karunamoorthy; C. Arunpandian
- Starring: Ravi Mohan; Vasundhara; Saranya; Liyasree as Susheela; Dhansika; Maha
- Cinematography: S. R. Sathish Kumar
- Edited by: N. Ganesh Kumar
- Music by: Vidyasagar
- Production company: Ayngaran International
- Distributed by: Ayngaran International
- Release date: 16 October 2009
- Running time: 150 minutes
- Country: India
- Language: Tamil
- Budget: ₹15 crore
- Box office: ₹25 crore

Peraanmai (transl. Valour) is a 2009 Indian Tamil-language action-adventure film directed by S. P. Jhananathan and produced by Ayngaran International. The film stars Ravi Mohan (credited as Jayam Ravi), Vasundhara, Saranya, Liyasree, Dhansika and Varsha Ashwathi (credited as Maha). It follows a National Cadet Corps (NCC) trainer and five cadets seeking to thwart a group of foreign mercenaries planning to destroy a rocket-launching project.

The core plot of Peraanmai is loosely based on the 1972 Soviet film The Dawns Here Are Quiet. Filming took place between March 2008 and April 2009, and the film was released in theatres on 16 October 2009, coinciding with the festival of Diwali. It won three Tamil Nadu State Film Awards: Stunt Coordinator (Miracle Michael), Best Art Director (T. Selvakumar) and Best Audiographer (T. Udaykumar).

== Plot ==
Duruvan is a trainer at a National Cadet Corps (NCC) camp for women cadets. His superior ranger, Ganapathiram, berates him for his caste and rough persona. Duruvan is also blamed for inappropriate acts by other cadets. However, Victoria, their warden, sympathises with him.

Duruvan selects female cadets Kalpana, Ajitha, Susheela, Jennifer, and Thulasi for an expedition. As a practical joke, the women complain to Ganapathiram that they do not feel safe with Duruvan. During the expedition, whilst Duruvan is caught up in procedures at a forest checkpost, the women buy condoms and other inappropriate items, start the jeep, and drive it down a hill. After losing the vehicle, the troop decides to stay in the forest for the night and return by an alternative route the next morning. The women start to bond with Duruvan. Kalpana sees two foreigners with advanced armaments in the Indian forest; Duruvan guesses they are heading towards an Indian satellite research station to destroy a rocket-launching project. He realises the foreigners will take five hours to reach the banks of Toonghum Lake. Duruvan knows a better route to the opposite bank that can be reached in 4.5 hours. He tells the women to inform Ganapathiram and bring extra forces, but the women disagree and go with Duruvan. They reach the opposite bank and find 16 mercenaries.

Duruvan realises the mercenaries' plan to sabotage the space mission and devises a plan to defeat them. He sends Ajitha to inform Indian officials, and the other women remain with him. Whilst en route, Ajitha gets trapped in quicksand and dies. Duruvan uses his navigational skills to place the troop ahead of the mercenaries and later obstructs their movement by cutting trees to distract them. Anderson, the leader of the foreign mercenary group, decides to stay back until a clear notice from the opposite side. He deploys two of his men to investigate, but Duruvan kills them. Anderson sends three men – Thompson, George, and Edwin – to the opposite side to find out what happened to the two men; Duruvan's troops are waiting for them to collect their armaments. Duruvan kills George and Edwin, but Thompson escapes. When Anderson realizes he has lost four men, he decides to kill his opponent.

Duruvan's troops plant the landmines they acquired from one of the dead mercenaries, and another of the mercenaries steps on a landmine and dies. This scares the mercenaries, and Anderson and Benny decide to search for the remaining landmines, while the others set up a camp there. That night, Dhuruvan and his troops break into the mercenaries' camp, kill two men, and seize one of their two boxes, expecting it to contain information about the air missile. The next morning, Anderson and Benny find two men dead and one box missing. Anderson tells Benny to take three men to the rocket launch site and launch the missile. Anderson takes the rest of his men to destroy Duruvan and the women, and a battle ensues.

On the other side, Ganapathiram finds the complaint letter, gathers his team, and goes to the forest checkpoint to find out what happened. The storekeeper tells him what happened and that condoms were purchased. Assuming Duruvan has kidnapped the women, Ganapathiram and his officers destroy Duruvan's community and homes and exile them from the area while insulting their lower-caste status. He finds Ajitha's corpse in the quicksand and assumes Duruvan raped and killed her. Ganapathiram describes Duruvan as a serial killer to the district collector, who, with Ganapathiram's permission, issues a shoot-at-sight order for Duruvan.

Duruvan and the women kill three of the mercenaries. Benny tells his fellow mercenary Collin to stay and guard the missile-containing box while they help Anderson in the battle. After finding their secret signal, Anderson kills Susheela and hangs her from a tree, and Duruvan and the women bury her body. The women kill Thompson and two more mercenaries, leaving only Anderson, Benny, and Collin. Benny finds Duruvan and the women, but Duruvan captures him and forces him to lure Anderson, after which Duruvan and the women kill Benny. Duruvan searches for Anderson, whilst the women go to stop the missile launch. Ganapathiram finds Duruvan and tries to shoot him. Duruvan tries to reveal the situation but fails. Using his walkie-talkie, Ganapathiram tries to order his men to kill Duruvan. Duruvan throws away the walkie-talkie, beats Ganapathiram, and escapes. When Ganapathiram goes to retrieve the walkie-talkie, he sees the mercenaries' corpses, realizes that Duruvan killed them, and reveals the situation to the collector.

Duruvan and Anderson fight face-to-face; Duruvan confronts and defeats Anderson, and the women kill Collin and try to disarm the counter missile from firing the space rocket. After an intense fight, Duruvan kills Anderson. Duruvan reaches the rocket launch site and helps the women; he increases the missile's timer by 25 seconds and diverts it left. The Indian space rocket launches and climbs into the atmosphere. After 25 seconds, the counter missile explodes in the forest. The troop congratulates itself but feels bad for Duruvan, whose bravery will never be recognized due to his caste. In the end, the Government of India awards Ganapathiram for bravery; Duruvan returns to the camp to train a new set of NCC cadets; and the women bid a tearful goodbye, remembering Ajitha and Susheela.

== Cast ==
- Ravi Mohan as R. Duruvan
- Vasundhara as Kalpana
- Saranya as Ajitha
- Liyasree as Susheela
- Dhansika as Jennifer
- Maha as Thulasi
- Vadivelu as Soosai
- Urvashi as Victoria
- Ponvannan as S. Ganapathiram
- Roland Kickinger as Anderson
- Svilen Kamburov as Benny
- Trotsky Marudu as a scientist (special appearance)
- O. A. K. Sundar as the district collector (special appearance)
- Boys Rajan as Kalpana's father

== Production ==
S. P. Jananathan had the idea for Peraanmai even before he made his directorial debut. The film is Dhanshika's first notable role in a Tamil film, and she was cast after Jananathan saw her family at a convention. This is also the film debut of models Liyasree and Varsha Ashwathi (credited as Maha). Ravi Mohan (then known as Jayam Ravi) underwent physical training for the lead role; this included avoiding oil, rice and salt for over a year. He shed 12 kilograms (26 lb) of weight in 22 days, and took a course in weaponry.

Filming began on 5 March 2008 at Mancholai, Papanasam and Ambasamudram. The set for Ravi's village was built at a dense forest of Ambasamudram. Roland Kickinger worked on the film, which was also shot in Kerala, for twenty days. Filming ended in April 2009.

== Soundtrack ==
Peraanmai

Soundtrack album by Vidyasagar
- Released: 18 September 2009
- Recorded: Varsha Vallaki Studios
- Genre: Feature Film Soundtrack
- Length: 20:17
- Language: Tamil
- Labels: Ayngaran Music; An Ak Audio
- Producer: Vidyasagar

Vidyasagar chronology
1977 (2009)	Peraanmai (2009)	Kanden Kadhalai (2009)

The music for Peraanmai was composed by Vidyasagar, and Vairamuthu wrote the lyrics. The audio was released at Sathyam Cinemas on 21 September 2009. Pavithra Srinivasan of Rediff.com wrote: "In most of the songs, Vidhyasagar has slipped into a familiar template, so it is worth just one listen".

Track listing
No.	Title	Singer(s)	Length
1.	"Kaattu Puli Adichu"	KK and Jassie Gift
2.	"Kaadu Kaalai Katta"	Madhu Balakrishnan
3.	"Yera Thala"	Sadhana Sargam
4.	"When The Boys"	Sonia Irabar and Sianed Jones
5.	"Thuppaaki Penne"	Pop Shalini, Megha, Febi and SuVi

== Release and reception ==
Peraanmai was released on 16 October 2009, Diwali day. Producers Ayngaran International distributed the film themselves. The film was screened at the Norway Tamil Film Festival in 2010.

=== Reception ===
Sify wrote, "Here is a definitive movie with a moral framework, and commitment along with a stunning and realistic climax", and also praising Ravi's acting. Pavithra Srinivasan of Rediff.com wrote: "A movie like this thrives on characters that knock against each other, and new emotions emerge but S P Jhananathan has thrust so many platitudes, morals and politics into it that it ends up being inadvertently hilarious. It's a script that looks good only on paper, filled with good intentions but hopelessly flawed."

Bhama Devi Ravi of The Times of India wrote: "if you are one of those passionate followers of Tamil cinema, and get all twitchy and charged up over the sameness in formula-driven action films and have been demanding at least a fresh storyline as a minimum requirement to escape a sense of deja vu, you can relax. Peraanmai, which attempts to offer that difference, is a refreshing change". Malathi Rangarajan of The Hindu wrote: "Despite the scepticism you feel, and the initial slowness, Peraanmai promises thrilling action in the second half", lauding the stuntwork and Ravi's performance.

A critic from The New Indian Express, wrote: "The director can be lauded for experimenting with different genres, and for his effort to deviate from the routine formula elements. But while Peraanmai can be a stepping stone for further such ventures, it also reveals that our filmmakers have a long way to go, before they can successfully execute such complex plots on screen." A critic from Deccan Herald wrote, "A tad tedious in the first half, Peraanmai gains pace post interval with a scintillating climax". A critic from Ananda Vikatan rated the film 48 out of 100, and wrote it deserves a respectable honour for its attempt to take Tamil cinema in a new direction.

=== Accolades ===
Peraanmai won in three categories at the Tamil Nadu State Film Awards: Best Stunt Coordinator (Miracle Michael), Best Art Director (T. Selvakumar) and Best Audiographer (T. Udaykumar).

== Bibliography ==
- Dhananjayan, G. (2011). The Best of Tamil Cinema, 1931 to 2010: 1977–2010. Galatta Media. OCLC 733724281.
