= Sanyathara =

Indian actress

- Born: Kerala, India
- Other names: Sania Sheik, Saniya Thara, Sanea Thara
- Occupation: Actress
- Years active: 2010–present

Sanyathara is an Indian actress, who has appeared in Tamil films.

== Career ==
She gave herself the screen name of Sanyathara, reportedly because she was a fan of tennis player Sania Mirza and actress Nayantara, and felt that the name would bring her luck.

She starred alongside newcomers in Oruvar Meethu Iruvar Sainthu, Panivizhum Malarvanam, and Adhu Vera Idhu Vera and with Vijay Vasanth in Nandha Periyasamy's Jigina.

Sanyathara has finished filming for Vaaraayo Vennilaave and Kadai Enn 6, both directed by Sasidharan, and Thagadu Thagadu starring lyricist Pa. Vijay.

== Filmography ==
Year	Title	Role	Notes
2010	Nalamdhana		
2013	Oruvar Meethu Iruvar Sainthu	Kavitha	
2014	Panivizhum Malarvanam	Kavya	
2014	Adhu Vera Idhu Vera		
2014	Jeeva	Preethi	
2015	Vanna Jigina	Angel Priya	
2016	Angali Pangali	Ilakiya	
2020	Mei Maranthen		
TBA	Vaaraayo Vennilaave		Post-production
