= Seesa =

- Promotional Poster
- Directed by: Mohamad Issack
- Written by: Mohamad Issack
- Produced by: Rajasekhar nalluri Mohamad Issack; MD Rajiya Bee
- Starring: Sivaji; Chesvaa; Namratha; Rohith Bhanuprakash
- Cinematography: E.J. Nauzad
- Music by: K. Basker
- Release date: 18 March 2016
- Running time: 123 minutes
- Country: India
- Language: Telugu

Seesa is a 2016 Indian Telugu-language film directed by Mohamad Issack, starring Sivaji, Chesvaa and Namratha. Seesa also has been shot in a single take like its original Agadam.

== Plot ==
Seesa is a thriller film all about human emotions in a bottle, where a 'ghost' takes revenge on her enemies.

== Cast ==
- Sivaji
- Chaswa
- Namratha
- Tharika
- Rohith Bhanuprakash

== Remake ==
Seesa is the remake of Tamil film Agadam which has been awarded the Guinness World Record for the longest uncut film that had a running time for 2 hours, 3 minutes and 30 seconds, a first in world cinema.

== Release ==
Seesa was released on 18 March 2016 across Telangana and Andhra Pradesh.
