= Ninaivellam Nithya =

1982 film by C. V. Sridhar

- DVD cover
- Directed by: C. V. Sridhar
- Written by: C. V. Sridhar
- Produced by: Prakash R. C.
- Starring: Karthik; Gigi
- Cinematography: Tiwari
- Edited by: Mani; Umanath
- Music by: Ilaiyaraaja
- Production company: Shiv Shakthi Films
- Release date: 18 June 1982
- Country: India
- Language: Tamil

Ninaivellam Nithya (transl. Thoughts are only of Nithya) is a 1982 Indian Tamil-language romance film written and directed by C. V. Sridhar. The film stars Karthik and Gigi, in her only acting role. It was released on 18 June 1982.

== Plot ==
Chandru, a young and carefree man visits an estate on a hill region along with his friend Thyagu. He meets Nithya, a local girl. At first they have a bit of standoffs but eventually they fall in love. At a time when their love affair is known to the girl's family, the whole village joins hands to separate them, but Chandru and Nithya escape to Chandru's hometown. Chandru was of the opinion that his father, a well-to-do businessman will support him, but he turns Chandru and Nithya away. Chandru and Nithya temporarily stay with Chandru's other friend. What happens to both of them forms the balance of the story.

== Cast ==
- Karthik as Chandru
- Gigi as Nithya
- Nizhalgal Ravi as Thyagu
- Nithershan Kugenesan

== Production ==
Gigi, a daughter of Gemini Ganesan, made her acting debut, and Ninaivellam Nithya was her only film as an actress.

== Soundtrack ==
The music was composed by Ilaiyaraaja, with lyrics by Vairamuthu. Many of the songs are set in ragas; "Rojavai Thalattum Thendral" is set in Pantuvarali, "Panivizhum Malar Vanam" is in Chalanata, "Neethane Enthan Pon Vasantham" is in Brindavani, and "Kanni Ponnu" is in Hamsanadam. Sudhakar played the flute for "Panivizhum Malar Vanam".

Tracklist

Song	Singers	Length
"Kaanal Neer Pol"	S. Janaki	04:12
"Kanni Ponnu"	Malaysia Vasudevan, P. Susheela	04:23
"Neethaane Enthan Pon Vasantham"	S. P. Balasubrahmanyam	04:26
"Ninaivellam Nithya"	S. P. Balasubrahmanyam	01:31
"Panivizhum Malar Vanam"	S. P. Balasubrahmanyam	04:30
"Rojaavai Thaalaattum"	S. P. Balasubrahmanyam, S. Janaki	04:13
"Tholin Mele"	S. P. Balasubrahmanyam	04:25

== Reception ==
S. Shiva Kumar of Mid-Day wrote, "Karthik's sensitive performance and Ilayaraja's soothing music save the film from being a total washout. Gigi makes a very unsure debut and looks uncomfortable throughout." Thiraignani of Kalki praised Karthik's acting and Ilaiyaraaja's music and also praised Sridhar for showing love in a different dimension. He concluded that though he wrote praising Sridhar after watching the film, the review is negative. Balumani of Anna newspaper praised the acting of the star cast and cinematography, but found Ilayaraja's songs to be average and stated Sridhar, who has focused well on the early part of the film, would have been a hit if he had focused well on the second half.

== Legacy ==
The song "Neethane Enthan Pon Vasantham" inspired the titles of a 2012 film (Neethaane En Ponvasantham, in which the lead character briefly sings the song) and a 2020 TV series. "Panivizhum Malarvanam" inspired the title of a 2014 film.
