= Mohamad Issack =

Indian film producer and director

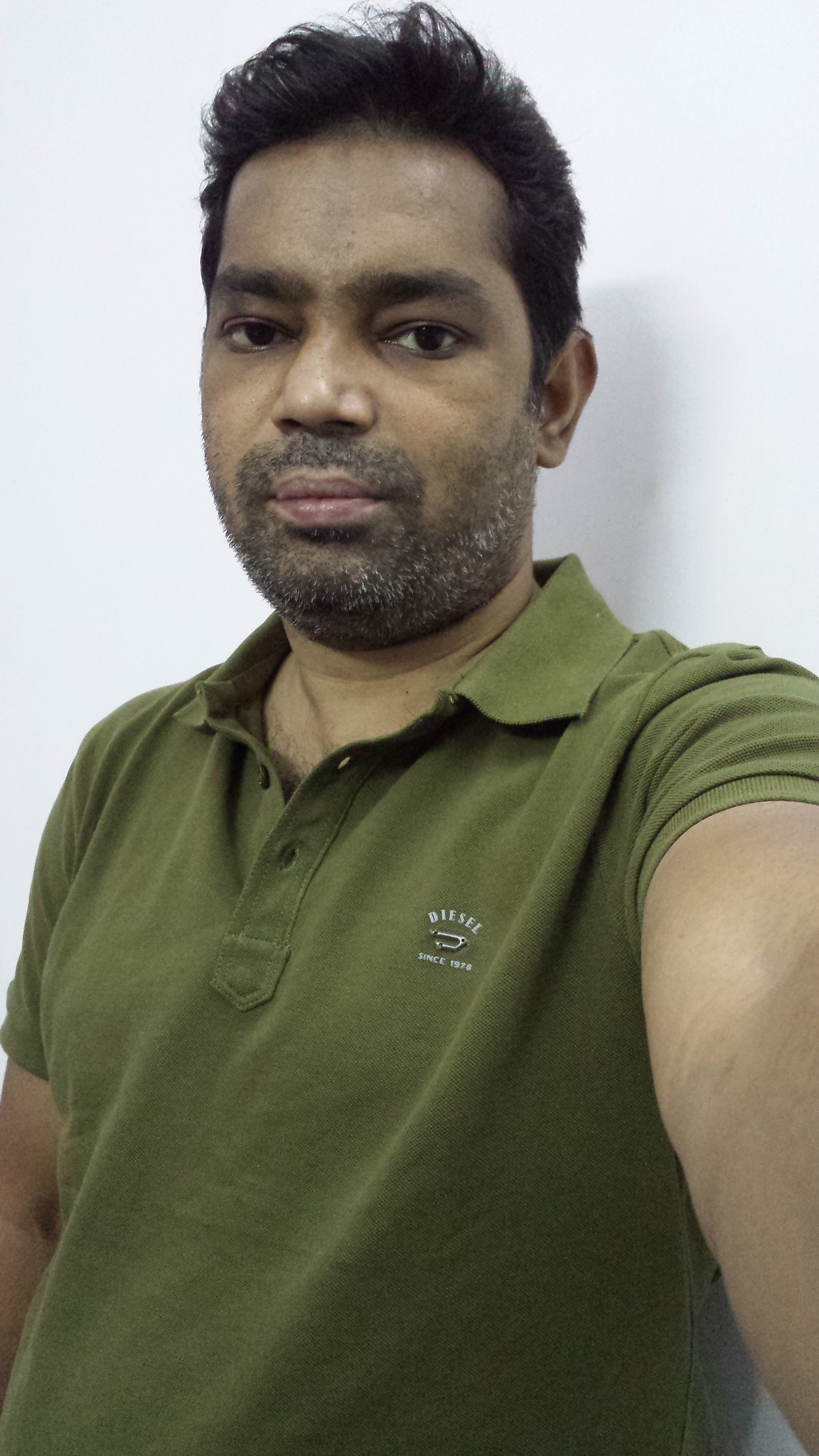
- Born: Puducherry, India
- Occupations: Director; Screenwriter; Producer
- Years active: 2006-

Mohamad Issack Zakria is an Indian film producer and director of Tamil cinema.

== Career ==
His debut film was Agadam. Agadam also claims to be the first film to be shot using night effects with a hand-held camera. Issack successfully remade the same film in Telugu as Seesa.

Issack's next project was Nagesh Thiraiyarangam (2018).

== Filmography ==
Year	Film	Director	Writer	Producer	Language	Notes
2014	Agadam	Yes	Yes	Yes	Tamil	
2016	Seesa	Yes	Yes	Yes	Telugu	Remake of Agadam
2018	Nagesh Thiraiyarangam	Yes	Yes	No	Tamil	
2022	181	Yes	Yes	No	Tamil	
