= Vallavanukku Pullum Aayudham =

2014 Indian film by Srinath

- Theatrical release poster
- Directed by: Srinath
- Story by: S. S. Kanchi
- Based on: Maryada Ramanna by S. S. Rajamouli
- Produced by: Prasad V Potluri; Santhanam
- Starring: Santhanam; Ashna Zaveri
- Cinematography: Shakthi; Richard M. Nathan
- Edited by: Sai Kant/Sai Prasad
- Music by: Siddharth Vipin
- Production companies: Handmade Films; PVP cinema
- Distributed by: Studio Green
- Release date: 9 May 2014
- Running time: 147 minutes
- Country: India
- Language: Tamil
- Box office: ₹45 crore

Vallavanukku Pullum Aayudham (transl. For the wise man, even a grass straw is a weapon) is a 2014 Indian Tamil-language action comedy film directed by Srinath and released by Studio Green on 9 May 2014. A remake of S. S. Rajamouli's successful Telugu film Maryada Ramanna (2010) which was based on Buster Keaton's Our Hospitality (1923), the film was jointly produced by PVP Cinema and Santhanam, who also played the lead role in it, alongside newcomer Ashna Zaveri. The music was composed by Siddharth Vipin.

== Plot ==
27 years ago, a faction feud in Tamil Nadu results Rathnavel kills Singaraayar's brother, and later Rathnavel succumbs to his injuries, and dies. Singaraayar, along with his two sons Dharma and Kaali, vow for revenge.

Time turns and comes to Chennai. Here lives Sakthi, an innocent and somewhat unlucky guy whose parents are no more and is ousted out of his job. His life takes a turn with a correspondence that he has five acres of land in his hometown in Tamil Nadu. He decides to sell that land and sets off to the village. In this process, he also meets Vaanathi, who is Singaraayar's daughter. However, much to Sakthi's bad luck, he happens to be the son of the man who killed Singaraayar's brother, and he ends up in their home itself. He takes advantage of a tradition of their house that not even one drop of blood should fall inside the house. Vaanathi falls for Sakthi in the meantime. He escapes in all the plans, much to Singaraayar's fury.

Soon the story takes a twist, when Vaanathi, not knowing that Shakthi is the son of Rathnavel, the man who killed her father's brother, falls for Shakthi. Her cousin Raja learns of this and refuses to marry Vaanathi, though Shakthi had convinced him earlier in order to prolong Singaraayar's plan. Singaraayar had moved the engagement to the temple so that Sakthi cannot prolong the plan to kill him any longer. When Raja tells Singaraayar about Vaanathi's love, he slaps Raja, and in the engagement, Dharma carries a basket that he thinks Shakthi is hiding in, away from the temple to kill him.

It is then revealed that Shakthi is still in Singaraayar's mansion. He then runs away from the house, only to be chased by Singaraayar's men, but Shakthi narrowly escapes from his death and is saved by Vaanathi. When he crosses a bridge which is located at a high place, he refuses to let Vaanathi come with him, and now, Vaanathi discovers the truth and is heartbroken. Soon, Singaraayar and his men arrive to kill Shakthi, who somehow escapes. Suddenly, Vaanathi tells her father that she was the one who loved Shakthi. Shakthi has a change of heart and decides to go back to Singaraayar to express his feelings to Vaanathi. Singaraayar orders his men to beat Shakthi. First, an angry Dharma punches Shakthi, and that is followed by three blows. Shakthi then hits a rod and loses consciousness and his breath, bleeding badly, as well. Vaanathi cannot bear this and jumps into the river. Shakthi saves Vaanathi while the family had just watched in shock. Singaraayar and his sons are stunned and realize they must end the feud. In the end, Shakthi marries Vaanathi.

== Cast ==
- Santhanam as Sakthi
- Ashna Zaveri as Vaanathi
- Nagineedu as Singaraayar
- Ravi Prakash as Dharma
- Sugunthan as Kaali
- Senthil Kumar as Raja
- VTV Ganesh as Deergadarisi
- Kreshna as Balamurugan
- Sujatha as Raja's mother
- Rekha Suresh as Vaanathi's mother
- Bose Venkat as Rathnavel, Sakthi's father
- Singampuli as Singam
- Rajakumaran as Raj
- Siddharth Vipin as Gang Boy
- John Vijay as Land Broker
- Abhinay as Land Broker
- Subbu Panchu Arunachalam as Land Broker
- Nalinikanth as Police Officer
- Cool Suresh as Servant
- Srinivasan in a special appearance as a gangster
- Srinath special appearance in the song "Takkaru Takkaru"
- G. Gnanasambandam as The voice of an cycle

== Production ==
The rights of S. S. Rajamouli's 2010 Telugu film Maryada Ramanna were sold to Prasad V Potluri for 35 lakh rupees. In October 2012, the production team announced that Santhanam would play the lead role in the venture, while R. Kannan would direct the film. Kannan subsequently opted out of the film, noting that he was unhappy on the first-copy production agreement which had been put in place, and was replaced by comedian Srinath, who had previously directed Muthirai (2009).

Delays in starting the film led to reports that Santhanam would be replaced by Siva Karthikeyan in the lead role, but this proved to be untrue. The team confirmed the title would be Vallavanukku Pullum Aayudham in June 2013, confirming that pre-production work was under way, with Anirudh signed on as music composer. Anirudh however dropped out of the project in early July 2013 owing to a busy schedule and was subsequently replaced by Santhosh Narayanan, who had achieved success for his work in Pizza (2012) and Soodhu Kavvum (2013). Santhosh was also replaced by Siddharth Vipin who earlier composed for Idharkuthane Aasaipattai Balakumara, apart from composing he was also selected to act in the film.

The team began shooting in mid September 2013 by filming scenes at EVP World, the amusement and theme park in Poonamallee on the Chennai to Bangalore highway. Mumbai based model Ashna Zaveri was signed on to play the leading female role, thus making her debut as a film actress.

== Soundtrack ==
Vallavanukku Pullum Aayudham

Soundtrack album by Siddharth Vipin
- Released: 14 April 2014
- Genre: Film soundtrack
- Language: Tamil
- Label: Sony Music
- Producer: Siddharth Vipin

Siddharth Vipin chronology
| Idharkuthane Aasaipattai Balakumara (2013) | Vallavanukku Pullum Aayudham (2014) | Navarasa Thilagam (2016) |

The film's soundtrack was scored by Siddharth Vipin and the lyrics were penned by Na. Muthukumar, Madhan Karky, Lalith Anand and Muthulingam.

Track listing
| No. | Title | Lyrics | Singer(s) | Length |
|---|---|---|---|---|
| 1. | "Takkaru Takkaru" | Lalithanand | Mukesh Mohamed |
| 2. | "Oh Oh Nadingal Oda" | Na. Muthukumar | Naresh Iyer, Shreya Ghoshal |
| 3. | "Otrai Dhevathai" | Madhan Karky | Karthik |
| 4. | "Chellakkutti" | Lalithanand | Ranjith, Vishnupriya Ravi |
| 5. | "Theme Song" | Muthulingam | Ananthu |

== Release ==
The satellite rights of the film were sold to Sun TV. The film was originally planned for a later release, but was advanced and opened in theatres on 10 May 2014 after Rajinikanth's Kochadaiiyaan, which had originally been scheduled for that weekend, was delayed. Studio Green acquired the film's distribution rights only two hours after Kochadaiiyaan's postponement had been announced and released the film in over 250 screens in Tamil Nadu.

== Critical reception ==
The Times of India gave the film 2.5 stars out of 5 and wrote, "Vallavanukku Pullum Aayudham is an example of how most of our filmmakers are clueless when it comes to economy of storytelling...the film only keeps reminding us what a better film its source, SS Rajamouli's Telugu film Maryada Ramanna (2010), is...though director Srinath opts for a frame-to-frame remake, the momentum is missing in the scenes, turning the film into a drag, even for those who haven't seen the Telugu film". Rediff gave it 2 stars out of 5 and wrote, "The plot may have worked earlier, but unfortunately Santhanam’s Vallavanukku Pullum Aayudham is slow and unexciting and does little to keep the audience entertained".

Sify wrote, "What works for the film is its simplicity in storytelling and the light hearted screenplay and steady stream of clever one-liners and witticisms", calling the film a "Time Pass Entertainer". Deccan Chronicle gave it 3.5 out of 5 stars and called it "an entertaining film through and through" and added, "Director Srinath plays on Santhanam’s strengths and delivers a clean entertainer. As a commercial film, Vallavanukku Pullum Aayudham surely hits the spot". Silverscreen.in wrote, "That Santhanam is the antithesis of a hero makes the film immensely plausible." and also computed an average aggregated Silverscore of 6/10 for the movie based on published reviews.
