= Adhu Vera Idhu Vera =

2014 Indian film by M. Thilakarajan

- Theatrical release poster
- Directed by: M. Thilakarajan
- Produced by: S. Jeyaseelan
- Starring: Varshan; Sanyathara
- Cinematography: Ravishankar
- Edited by: Ganesh
- Music by: Taj Noor
- Production company: Jeni Powerful Media
- Release date: May 30, 2014
- Country: India
- Language: Tamil

Adhu Vera Idhu Vera (transl. That is different, this is different) is a 2014 Indian Tamil-language romantic comedy film directed by M. Thilakarajan and starring newcomer Varshan and Sanyathara. The film was released on 30 May 2014.

== Cast ==
- Varshan as Gurusamy
- Sanyathara
- Imman Annachi as Constable Kandasamy
- Ganja Karuppu
- Singamuthu
- Shakeela
- Thyagu
- Ponnambalam
- Thalapathy Dinesh
- Bonda Mani
- Velmurugan
- Subraj

== Production ==
This is the director's third film after Naadu Adhai Naadu (1991) and Chinna Mani (1995). Varshan, son of actor Jayamani, made his debut with this film. The director said the premise was inspired by Nayakan (1987) and Baashha (1995) in which the hero aspires to become a don.

== Soundtrack ==
The music was composed by Taj Noor.

Song	Lyricist	Singer(s)
"Saami Thindhana Thom"	Na. Muthukumar	Velmurugan
"Mundiripu Azhagi"	Na. Muthukumar	Nivas, Malavika
"Chinnadaaga Morachiputta"	Viveka	Gana Bala
"Micky Mousa Paarthaal"	Viveka	Nincy Vincent
"Atobom Baby"	Viveka	Ramya, Padmalatha, Taj Noor
"Adhu Vera Idhu Vera"	Karuppasami	Mukesh

== Reception ==
A critic from Silverscreen India wrote that the film is "One that seamlessly blends very bad comedy, spectacularly bad acting and some dialogues that you need to hear to believe". A critic from Dinamalar criticised the film's writing and lack of comedy.
