= Varsha Ashwathi =

Indian actress (born 1989)

Varsha R Ashwathi
- Born: Varsha R Ashwathi; 22 April 1989 (age 37); Kolkata, India
- Occupation: Actress
- Years active: 2009–2014
- Website: http://www.varshaashwathi.com

Varsha R Ashwathi (born 22 April 1989) is an Indian former actress, who appeared in Tamil films. Varsha won the 'Miss Beautiful' title in the 2006 "Miss" Chennai contest. In the year 2009, Varsha made her acting debut in Tamil film Peraanmai which co-starred Jeyam Ravi.

== Personal life ==
Ashwathi was born the daughter of a marine engineer. Ashwathi's family is originally from Uttar Pradesh, and as such her first language is Hindi. Varsha moved to Tuticorin at a young age, where she learnt Tamil. Ashwathi is also fluent in Telugu. She participated in the National Cadet Corps in her youth.

== Career ==
After appearing in the Miss Chennai pageant, Varsha's film career began with award-winning director S. P. Jananathan's film Peraanmai, in which she played the character of Thulasi an NCC girl. In 2012, Varsha played an IPS Officer 'Agnes' in Neerparavai, where she acted with Nandita Das. Varsha later performed in Nagaraja Cholan MA, MLA. She shot for the Tamil films Panivizhum Malarvanam, Endrendrum Punnagai and Kangaroo. Varsha made her debut in the Malayalam film industry with the unreleased film Don’t Worry Be Happy. In the film directed by Shaison Ouseph, she plays a TV anchor of a reality show involving seven married couples.

== Filmography ==
- All films are in Tamil, unless otherwise noted.

Year	Film	Role	Notes
2009	Peraanmai	Thulasi	credited as Maha
2012	Neerparavai	Agnes	
2013	Nagaraja Cholan MA, MLA	Amudha	
2013	Endrendrum Punnagai	Parvi	
2014	Panivizhum Malarvanam	Malar	
2014	Athithi	Lakshmi	
2014	Kangaroo	Chellam	
