= Naangellam Edagoodum =

2014 Indian film by R Vijaykumar

- Theatrical release poster
- Directed by: R Vijaykumar
- Starring: Manoj Devadas; Veena Nair
- Cinematography: R S Saravanan Pillai
- Music by: Charles Melvin
- Release date: 5 December 2014
- Country: India
- Language: Tamil

Naangellam Edagoodum (transl. We are all equal) is a 2014 Indian Tamil-language action drama film directed by R Vijaykumar and starring Manoj Devadas and Veena Nair. The music was composed by newcomer Charles Melvin.

== Plot ==
A boxing coach becomes angry that all his students are rowdies. A needy group of new students ask if they can train under him.

== Cast ==
- Manoj Devadas as Maari
- Veena Nair as Maha
- Rajesh as Devaraj
- George Vijay Nelson as Mani
- Raghavan
- Senthil Kumar
- Vijayashankar
- Srinivasan
- Jackie
- Master Rohith
- Baby Kanishka

== Production ==
The film was shot in 47 days in Ennore and Thiruvottiyur.

== Reception ==
A critic from The New Indian Express wrote that "Naangellam Edagoodam is at the most a passable fare". A critic from The Times of India wrote that " Naangellam Edagoodum could have been much more than what it eventually has turned out to be". A critic from Silverscreen India wrote that "The whole routine makes me feel like I am watching TV with a restless person switching channels all the time. Romance. Comedy. Action. Back to Romance".
