= Ra (2014 film) =

2014 Indian film by Prabu Yuvaraj

- Directed by: Prabu Yuvaraj
- Written by: Ashraf; Prabu Yuvaraj
- Produced by: Ameen; Akbar
- Starring: Ashraf; Aditi Chengappa
- Cinematography: Saravanan Ramasamy
- Edited by: Prem Boominathan
- Music by: Raj Aryan
- Production company: Plan A Studios
- Release date: 5 December 2014
- Country: India
- Language: Tamil

Ra is a 2014 Indian Tamil fantasy horror film written by debutant Prabu Yuvaraj, who co-wrote the film alongside Ashraf. Produced by Ameen and Akbar, the film features Ashraf and Aditi Chengappa in lead roles. The music was composed by Raj Aryan with cinematography by Saravanan Ramasamy and editing by Prem Boominathan. The film was launched at Chennai in July 2013, and it released on 5 December 2014 to positive reviews.

The film seems to have been highly inspired by the Hollywood film Insidious.

== Plot ==
Ajay's wife Renya had died mysteriously on the very first day of their marriage. Ajay started a quest to solve the mystery behind her death. Then, he went to a ghost hunter to ask a favor: to help him see his wife's soul. The ghost hunter hypnotized him and sent him to another world. As he traveled, he tried to go through a mysterious red door. After that, he came to reality and explained what he had done in the alternate world. The ghost hunter, after hearing him, said that the red door was protected by a deadly monster, and if anybody entered the door, a big war would rise into action in the real world, and soon the world would be destroyed by the monster. A few days later, some panoramal activities are observed at Ajay's house. Then movie ends with some twist and horror scene.

== Cast ==
- Ashraf as Ajay
- Aditi Chengappa as Renya
- JP Jay as Inspector Deena Dayalan
- Lawrence R as Prabu
- Geetha Baby
- Rethika Srinivas as Ajay's sister

== Release ==
The film was released on 5 December 2014.

== Soundtrack ==
Ra

Soundtrack album by Raj Aryan
- Released: 2014
- Genre: Feature film soundtrack
- Length: 26:20
- Language: Tamil
- Label: Saregama
- Producer: Raj Aryan

Raj Aryan chronology
Ra (2014)	Gurkha (2019)

The soundtrack was composed by Raj Aryan.

Track listing
No.	Title	Singer(s)	Length
1.	"Varuvayo Thaen Malai Eval"	Karthik	4:14
2.	"Yutham"	Lawrence	3:52
3.	"Devathai"	Karthik	4:10
4.	"Ye Pulla Yean Usurae"	Raj, M. M. Monisha	4:49
5.	"Kannurangai"	Nivas, M. M. Manasi	3:23
6.	"Ye Pulla Yean Usurae (Remix)"	Lawrence, Sathguru, M. M. Monisha	4:06
7.	"Ra Theme"		1:56

== Critical reception ==
The film received mostly positive reviews from critics. Behindwoods rated the film positively and wrote, "A fairly well made thriller by debutants with strong technical backing". M. Suganth of The Times Of India gave 3.5 out of 5 and wrote, "Ra is essentially a haunted house thriller but the writers Ashraf and Prabu Yuvaraj (the hero and the director of the film respectively) introduce an element of fantasy that gives it a different color. And, their treatment isn't kitschy in the least bit and the director whips up a genuine sense of dread like Hollywood horror films Insidious, Stir Of Echoes and Dead Silence".
