= Sri Priyanka =

Indian actress

- Born: Priyanka Gunasekaran; 30 October 1995 (age 30); Puducherry, India
- Occupation: Actress
- Years active: 2010-present

Sri Priyanka is an Indian actress who has appeared in Tamil language films. After portraying her first major lead role in Agadam (2014), she appeared in the Tamil film Kangaroo (2015). She even had an appearance in the soap opera Seetha Raman as the lead role in Zee Tamil.

In April 2017, she signed to play an important role in Vikram - Tamannaah starrer Sketch directed by Vijay Chander.

== Career ==
Sri Priyanka made her acting debut through the low-budget village-centric film, Nila Meedhu Kadhal, for which she worked throughout 2012. Sri Priyanka then appeared in Agadam (2014), a film which entered the Guinness Record Books for being the longest uncut film, before signing on to appear in director Samy's Kangaroo (2015). Prior to accepting the offer, she revealed she had not seen any of the director's controversial earlier films.

During the making of Kodai Mazhai in June 2014, Priyanka fainted after being slapped by her fellow actor, Kalanjiyam. Her family considered filing a legal complaint against the makers of the film before opting not to pursue the matter further.

Regarding her performance as a female cop in Miga Miga Avasaram (2019), a critic wrote that "The only takeaway is the decent performance by Sri Priyanka, who managed to convey the harrowing experience women face during such situations".

== Filmography ==
=== Films ===
Key
†	Denotes films that have not yet been released

Year	Film	Role	Notes
2010	Aasami		Debut film
2013	Nila Meedhu Kadhal		
2014	Agadam		
2014	13 Am Pakkam Parkka	Priya	
2015	Kangaroo	Azhagu	
2015	Vandha Mala	Vasantha	
2016	Kathiravanin Kodai Mazhai	Thanga Thorachi	credited as Srija
2017	Pichuva Kaththi		
2018	Sketch	Priya	
2018	Saranalayam		
2019	Saaral		
2019	Miga Miga Avasaram	Samandhi	Won—Norway Tamil Film Festival Award for Best Actress
2022	Kombu Vatcha Singamda	Ragini	
2022	Anandham Vilayadum Veedu	Kayal	
2023	Tamil Kudimagan	Parvathy	
2023	Kuiko	Malaiyarasi	

=== Television ===
Year	Film	Role	Notes	Network
2023—2024	Seetha Raman	Seetha	Replaced Priyanka Nalkari	Zee Tamil
