= Panivizhum Malarvanam =

2014 Indian film by James David

- Poster
- Directed by: James David
- Produced by: Maaruthy Nanthan; Aravainth; Indran Raveendran
- Starring: Abhilash; Sanyathara; Varsha Ashwathi
- Cinematography: N. Raagav
- Edited by: Ravi Shankar
- Music by: B. R. Rajin
- Release date: 21 February 2014
- Country: India
- Language: Tamil

Panivizhum Malarvanam (transl. A forest of flowers where dew falls) is a 2014 Indian Tamil-language thriller film written and directed by James David. The film stars Abhilash and Sanyathara in the lead roles, while Varsha Ashwathi, Sai Vishal and Jawahar appear in other pivotal roles. The film's music is by music director B. R. Rajin. The film was released on 21 February 2014.

== Cast ==
- Abhilash as Tarun
- Sanyathara as Kavya
- Varsha Ashwathi as Malar
- Sai Vishal as Viju
- Ravi Venkatraman as Kavya's father
- Yogi Babu as Tarun's friend
- Jawahar

== Production ==
The film's title is derived from a song from Ninaivellam Nithya (1981). The film was written and directed by newcomer James David, who had previously assisted director Aabhavanan and was an associate director for films such as Nee Venunda Chellam, Rameswaram and the 3D animated Inimey Nangathan. The lead actor Abhilash also made his debut in a lead role, having previously portrayed a supporting role in Gautham Vasudev Menon's Neethane En Ponvasantham (2012). The film began shoot in August 2012 and was filmed in locations across Kumily and Thekkady in Kerala. The team also claimed to have selected the tiger which had appeared in Hangover 3 for the venture, while collaborating with the brands Incredible India and Save the Tiger. An audio release function was held in May 2013 with Balu Mahendra and Vairamuthu attending as chief guests.

== Music ==
Music by B. R. Rajin. The film's audio released in May 2013 and the songs have lyrics written by Vairamuthu and Ravi Indrahan.

Track listing
No.	Title	Singer(s)	Length
1.	"Malaiyil Ula"	Solar Sai
2.	"Thoorathila Aagayam"	Belly Raj, Chinmayi
3.	"Ava Ennannamo"	Haricharan
4.	"Amma Amma Amma"	Madhu Balakrishnan
5.	"Kaadu" (Instrumental)	-

== Reception ==
The film opened on 21 February 2014. Manigandan K R of The Times of India wrote, "to cut a long story short, while the messages David's film seeks to convey are significant, the manner in which they have been packaged isn't." Malini Mannath of The New Indian Express noted it was a "fairly engaging thriller", writing that "the narration may seem a tad loosely etched and jumpy at times and has its glitches. But it’s a debutant director’s sincere effort to move away from the beaten path and is refreshingly different."
