= Jeeva (2014 film) =

2014 Indian film by Suseenthiran

- Poster
- Directed by: Suseenthiran
- Written by: Santhosh (Dialogues)
- Screenplay by: Suseenthiran; Arun Balaji
- Story by: Suseenthiran
- Produced by: Arya; Suseenthiran; R. Madhi; Rajeevan; S. Shanmugam
- Starring: Vishnu Vishal; Sri Divya
- Cinematography: R. Madhi
- Edited by: Anthony L. Ruben
- Music by: D. Imman
- Production companies: The Show People; The Next BiG Film; Vennila Kabadi Team
- Distributed by: Vishal Film Factory
- Release date: 26 September 2014
- Running time: 127 minutes
- Country: India
- Language: Tamil

Jeeva is a 2014 Indian Tamil-language sports film written and directed by Suseenthiran, who also produces the film along with cinematographer R. Madhi and art director Rajeevan under the banner of Vennila Kabadi Team. The film stars Vishnu Vishal (as the title character) and Sri Divya, while Soori and Lakshman Narayan play supporting roles. Its music was composed by D. Imman, cinematography was handled by R. Madhi and editing was by Anthony L. Ruben, while dialogue was written by Santhosh. This film is about a young aspiring cricketer who dreams of playing for the India national cricket team. The film was released on 26 September 2014.

== Plot ==
The films begins with Jeeva, who sits on a park bench and starts to narrate his life story. He is a lower middle-class boy who is interested in cricket from a young age and sees Sachin Tendulkar as his idol. Though his father initially does not support him, he later starts to do so on the request of his friend. Jeeva grows up and becomes a part of the school team. He excels in his game and turns out to be a star player. Seeing his performances, a local cricket club offers him a chance to join and train with them, for which his father disagrees saying that his academic performance is poor due to cricket and he may not get a job in future. In between, Jeeva falls in love with his neighbour Jenny, but they are broken up when their family discovers this. Jeeva starts to drink due to this heartbreak, so to make him concentrate on good deeds again, Jeeva's father agrees to let him join the cricket club.

Jeeva becomes a sensation at the club, scoring good runs in every game. His opening partner Ranjith initially has ego clashes with Jeeva, but later they become friends and produce great performances. They both develop and their team starts to enter higher division competitions. In the meantime, Jenny meets Jeeva after a long time, and they start loving again. However, he is pressured into marrying her and pleads for a chance after being selected. Then comes the tournament that selects the players for the Tamil Nadu Ranji Trophy team, and as expected, both Jeeva and Ranjith are selected. However, the real trouble starts after joining the Tamil Nadu Team: it mostly comprises players from a particular community, and since Jeeva and Ranjith are from a different community, they are sidelined for most of the games. They are given chances in tough conditions where it is hard to score more runs, but they still manage to put up a decent performance. Jeeva even once gets applauded by the captain of the Rajasthan team, who is a veteran national team member, but being dropped in the upcoming games affects their average and their subsequent chances of joining the team for future games.

Angered by being rejected from the team, Ranjith storms into the Association office and blasts at the chairman for showing partiality towards a particular community and leaves with a heavy heart. Both Jeeva and Ranjith feel that their cricketing careers are over. Ranjith commits suicide and Jeeva is heartbroken. Jenny's father agrees for their marriage and promises a job for Jeeva, provided he converts to Christianity and quits cricket. Jeeva initially agrees but immediately tells Jenny that he cannot live without cricket, and Jenny leaves him. Jeeva returns to training and he practices even harder, waiting for a miracle to happen that will revive his cricketing career.

That miracle occurs when his coach gets a call from the Rajasthan CPL (IPL) team franchise, to offer Jeeva a chance to play in the upcoming season of CPL. Jeeva learns that it was the Rajasthan Team Captain, Irfan, who applauded him during the Ranji Trophy match, who has suggested his name for the CPL. Jeeva is awestruck and happy as his coach says that if he performs well in the CPL, he can directly enter the national team. He and his family celebrate this as he reunites with Jenny.

The story returns to the present, where Jeeva, now a star player of the national cricket team, is being interviewed by TV channels. He narrates his experience on his debut CPL match, where he smashes the first ball he faces for a sixer, and he consistently puts up great performances, which seals his place in the national team. Jeeva ends his interview by saying that in other countries, players lose by playing, but in India, the players lose even without getting a chance to participate.

== Cast ==
- Vishnu Vishal as D. Jeeva
- Sri Divya as Jenny, Jeeva's love interest
- Soori as David, Jeeva's senior
- Lakshman Narayan as Ranjith, Jeeva's friend
- Sanyathara as Preethi
- Charlie as Arul Pragasam
- Madhusudhan Rao as Parthasarathy, Tamilnadu State selection head
- G. Marimuthu as Jeeva's father
- T. Siva as Jenny's father
- Anjali Varadarajan
- Rindhu Ravi
- Sreeja Ravi as Ranjith's mother
- Ravi as Cricket Club Coach
- Udhayabhanu Maheswaran as Raghavan, Tamilnadu Ranji Trophy Team Coach
- Bava Lakshmanan as Murugan
- Monica Chinnakotla as Ebbie, Jenny's sister
- Akila as Jeeva's sister
- Sanjay Bharathi as DCI Team Cricketer
- Arya as CPL Cameraman (cameo appearance)
- Natty Subramaniam in a cameo appearance in the song "Oru Rosa"
- Surabhi in a cameo appearance in the song "Oruthi Mele"
- Varun Chakravarthy as DCI Club Cricketer (cameo appearance)

== Production ==
The project initially began as a Tamil-Telugu bilingual, with Sundeep Kishan selected to portray the lead role in the Telugu version, but scheduling problems meant that the version was dropped. Surbhi was signed to act in the film but had to opt out later due to conflicting schedules. The title of the film was officially announced to be Jeeva in May 2014.

== Music ==
The film's score and soundtrack are composed by D. Imman under the Sony Music India label. The film notably had its songs' lyrics written by Vairamuthu and his two sons Madhan Karky and Kabilan Vairamuthu; Madhan Kary believed Jeeva was the first such album to have the trio from the same family. A launch event was held on 11 September 2014.

Track listing
No.	Title	Lyrics	Singer(s)	Length
1.	"Ovvundraai Thirudugiraai"	Vairamuthu	Karthik, Bhavya Pandit	04:45
2.	"Oru Rosa"	Madhan Karky	Anthony Daasan, A. V. Pooja	04:09
3.	"Oruthi Maelae"	Madhan Karky	Abhay Jodhpurkar, El Fé Choir	04:23
4.	"Sangimangi"	Kabilan Vairamuthu	Nivas, Malavika & Tha Mystro	04:44
5.	"Engae Ponaai"	Madhan Karky	S. P. Balasubrahmanyam	03:53
6.	"Ovvundraai Thirudugiraai" (karaoke)	–	–	04:45
7.	"Oruthi Maelae" (karaoke)	–	–	04:21
8.	"Netru Naan" (short)	Madhan Karky	D. Sathyaprakash	01:40
Total length:				32:01

== Release ==
Actors Vishal's Vishal Film Factory bought the Tamil Nadu theatrical rights of Jeeva. The film was released on 26 September 2014.

== Reception ==
M. Suganth of The Times of India gave the film 3 stars out of 5 and wrote, "Suseenthiran pads up the film with the tropes that the genre needs. Though it has its heart in the right place the problem with Jeeva is that it is uneven. Cricket takes a backseat every time the director decides to focus on the love angle, taking some fizz out of the film". Subha J. Rao of The Hindu wrote, "A film has stayed true to its soul if it replays in your mind long after you've left the theatre. In most parts, Jeeva does that". IANS gave 3 stars out of 5 and wrote, "Jeeva is gripping with a moving second half, but not as inspiring as Nagesh Kukunoor's Bollywood film Iqbal. Suseenthiran's desperate act to portray his film as a commercial entertainer and not as a sports-drama doesn't go down too well. It somehow distracts you from the film's core subject and that's a big letdown. If only these crucial comprises were handled with care, the film would've been highly satisfying". Sify wrote, "Jeeva is sure to provide inspiration to many youngsters with similar cricket dreams and aspirations...it is a nice entertaining film, and another feather on the director's cap".
