= Aditi Chengappa =

Indian actress

- Born: Bangalore, India
- Occupation: Actress
- Years active: 2010–present
- Father: Raj Chengappa

Aditi Chengappa is an Indian actress, who appears in Telugu, Tamil, Hindi and Hollywood cinema.

== Early life ==
Aditi was born in Bangalore. Her father, Raj Chengappa, an Arebashe Gowda from Karnataka, is the editorial director of publishing The India Today Group (Noida), while her mother, Usha Chengappa, a Tamilian, is the Delhi Centre Head at Bharat Thakur's Artistic Yoga. Her brother Aneesh Chengappa is a music producer. She is related to Rukmini Devi Arundale, an Indian theosophist, dancer and choreographer of the Indian classical dance form of Bharatnatyam, and Carnatic musician and playback singer D. K. Pattammal, both being her great grand aunts.

Aditi studied at Vasant Valley School and then at Lady Shri Ram College in Delhi. She has been trained in both Hindustani classical and western vocals. She is also an accomplished pianist, representing both school and college. She has stated "Music was my only passion till I became interested in acting. Music remains my first love". She is a big fan of yoga and a gaming freak. When she was in college, she hosted a health show, "Bodylicious" on NDTV Good Times, with her mother Usha Chengappa .

== Career ==
She made her film debut in Telugu film Thakita Thakita. Her Tamil debut Konjam Koffee Konjam Kaadhal never had a theatrical release. She has completed a Hindi film, titled X, which is directed by 11 filmmakers. She is shooting for Gunasekhar's Telugu 3D period-drama Rudhramadevi, in which she plays Rudrama Devi's sister Ganapamba. She has also signed two new Tamil projects, a science fiction film titled Ra and a romantic comedy, Moone Moonu Vaarthai. She has moved to Berlin, Germany, and is now practicing yoga, Find her at https://www.aditi.yoga/

== Filmography ==
Year	Film	Role	Language	Notes
2010	Thakita Thakita	Nandhini	Telugu	Debut film
2014	Ra	Ramya	Tamil	
2015	X: Past Is Present	Aastha	Hindi	
2015	Rudhramadevi	Ganapamba	Telugu	
2015	Moone Moonu Varthai	Anjali	Tamil	
2015	Moodu Mukkallo Cheppalante	Anjali	Telugu	
2019	The Least of These: The Graham Staines Story	Shanti Banerjee	English	
