= Agadam =

2014 Indian film by Mohamad Issack

- Theatrical release poster
- Directed by: Mohamad Issack
- Written by: Mohamad Issack
- Produced by: Mohamad Issack; Rasiyabi Mohamad
- Starring: Tamizh; Srini Iyer; Sri Priyanka
- Cinematography: E.J. Nauzad
- Music by: Basker
- Production company: Last Bench Boys Productions
- Release date: 3 January 2014
- Running time: 123 minutes
- Country: India
- Language: Tamil

Agadam (transl. Wickedness [or] Injustice) is a 2014 Indian Tamil-language horror film directed by Mohamad Issack, featuring Baskar, Srini Iyer, and Sri Priyanka. Agadam was certified by the Guinness World Records as the longest uncut film which has a running time for 2 hours, 3 minutes and 30 seconds. The entire film was shot on 7 December 2012.

The film, set in real time, starts with men burying the body of a woman whose ghost returns and haunts them.

Issack remade the film in Telugu as Seesa. The record was broken by One Shot Fear Without Cut in 2014.

== Cast ==
- Tamizh
- Srini Iyer
- Sri Priyanka
- Bombay Baskar as John
- Kalaisekaran as Ashok
- Saravana Balaji as Pichai Perumal
- Anisha as the prostitute
- Master Ajay as young Abdul Kalam

== Production ==
Official Guinness record awarded to Agadam

The entire film was shot on 7 December 2012 at a three-storey bungalow near Porur in Chennai. The film running for 2 hours, 3 minutes and 30 seconds was shot on a single camera without any cuts and therefore awarded the Guinness World Record for being the longest uncut film, beating the record held by Russian Ark directed by Alexander Sokurov, which used a single 96-minute Steadicam sequence shot.

A director registered with the union (L. Suresh of Eththan fame), a notary public and a government teacher were present during the shoot, while a team followed Isaak and the cinematographer E.J. Nauzad Khan and filmed the entire making of the film in order to send the video to the Guinness Record jury. The camera used was a Sony NEX-FS100.

Director Issack gave up his software job to "make a film that is different, yet entertaining" and said that he wanted his first film to make an impact. He spent over a year on the script and stated that he was inspired by Russian Ark. Ten people were involved in the making of the film, the director, the cameraman, and 8 actors, who were all newcomers. The team rehearsed for over a month before the filming and the entire sequence was said to be rehearsed over 40 times. Agadam was also the first film to be shot in the night effect with a hand-held camera. The film, which had no songs, was awarded a U/A certificate by the Censor Board.

== Reception ==
Dinamalar appreciated the film stating that the film has a good medical message and stands out in its unique attempt of single shot filming. They also lauded the entire cast as well as the technicians, concluding that the slow pace of some parts has not affected the good result. Kungumam magazine appreciated the cameraman as well as the director for making a single shot film completely in a house. Maalai Malar daily mentioned that the cinematography as well as direction has to be appreciated, but music lacked the thrill. Overall the effort can be appreciated for making a single-shot film. In contrast, M. Suganth of The Times of India, who could not watch the film in one sitting due to a forced interval, rated the film 1.5 out of 5, saying that "Agadam is a cautionary tale that proves that while digital has made it possible for anyone to make a film, not everyone should make one."

== See also ==
- Single shot films
