= Good Bad Ugly (soundtrack) =

2025 soundtrack album by G. V. Prakash Kumar

- Soundtrack album cover

Soundtrack album by G. V. Prakash Kumar
- Released: 10 April 2025
- Recorded: 2024–2025
- Studios: Divine Labs, Chennai; Sounds Right Studios, Chennai; Albuquerque Records, Chennai; River Records India, Chennai; Synergy Studios, Chennai
- Genre: Feature film soundtrack
- Length: 13:55
- Language: Tamil
- Label: T-Series
- Producer: G. V. Prakash Kumar

G. V. Prakash Kumar chronology
Robinhood (2025)	Good Bad Ugly (2025)	Padaiyaanda Maaveeraa (2025)

Singles from Good Bad Ugly
- 1. "OG Sambavam" Released: 18 March 2025; 2. "God Bless U" Released: 30 March 2025; 3. "Ak The Tiger" Released: 9 April 2025

External audio
- Good Bad Ugly- Jukebox on YouTube

Good Bad Ugly is the soundtrack album to the 2025 Tamil-language film of the same name directed by Adhik Ravichandran and produced by Mythri Movie Makers and T-Series Films starring Ajith Kumar in the lead role. The film's musical score is composed by G. V. Prakash Kumar. The soundtrack album, which consisted of four songs, was released under the T-Series label on 10 April 2025.

== Production ==
The film was initially announced with Devi Sri Prasad as the composer, in his first collaboration with Adhik Ravichandran and second with Ajith Kumar after Veeram (2014). However, Prasad was replaced due to creative differences with the production company Mythri Movie Makers, as he blamed them for being complained about failing to deliver the songs and background score on time for Pushpa 2: The Rule (2024). G. V. Prakash Kumar, who had worked on Adhik's Trisha Illana Nayanthara (2015) and Mark Antony (2023), was then reported to replace Prasad as the composer. His involvement was confirmed by the producers on 28 February 2025, during the film's teaser release. Good Bad Ugly also marked Prakash's second collaboration with Ajith after 18 years, since Kireedam (2007).

Prakash described Good Bad Ugly as one of the challenging projects because he joined the film very late and had nearly a month to score the film as well as compose fresh music for the songs that had been shot. Since the entire film was completed, Prakash added that he had the final visual footage in hand and his songs had to match the lip sync throughout the runtime, recalling a similar incident when composing "Un Mela Aasadhaan" in Aayirathil Oruvan (2010). Comparing it being starkingly different to Kireedam whose soundtrack "was really classy and entirely in lieu of the storyline", Prakash admitted that the film's score and songs were "designed inch-by-inch for a theatrical experience to the hilt, set to elevate each frame and Ajith sir's performance".

== Release ==
The first single titled "OG Sambavam", sung by G. V. Prakash Kumar and Adhik, under the lyrics of Vishnu Edavan, was released on 18 March 2025. The second single titled "God Bless U", featured vocals by Anirudh Ravichander, was written by Rokesh, and rap performed by Paal Dabba, was released on 30 March 2025. The third single titled "Ak The Tiger" was released on 9 April 2025. The song is a recreation of "Puli Puli" performed by Malaysian Samba rock artist Darkkey Nagaraja and his band Darkeys and the Keys. The fourth song, "Ranagalam", performed by Smith Asher and Nixen, was released as part of the album on 10 April.

== Track listing ==
No.	Title	Lyrics	Singer(s)	Length
1.	"OG Sambavam"	Vishnu Edavan	G. V. Prakash Kumar, Adhik Ravichandran	3:16
2.	"God Bless U"	Rokesh, Paal Dabba	Anirudh Ravichander, Paal Dabba	4:00
3.	"AK The Tiger"	Darkkey Nagaraja	Darkkey Nagaraja	3:23
4.	"Ranagalam"	Nixen	Smith Asher, Nixen	3:15
Total length:				13:55

Non-album track
No.	Title	Lyrics	Singer(s)	Length
1.	"Good Bad Ugly (Teaser Theme)"	Instrumental	Instrumental	1:18

== Background score ==
Good Bad Ugly

Film score by G. V. Prakash Kumar
- Released: 1 August 2025
- Recorded: 2024–2025
- Studios: Divine Labs, Chennai; Sounds Right Studios, Chennai; Albuquerque Records, Chennai; River Records India, Chennai; Synergy Studios, Chennai
- Genre: Film score
- Length: 18:11
- Language: Tamil
- Label: Sony Music
- Producer: G. V. Prakash Kumar

No.	Title	Length
1.	"Hero Intro"	1:22
2.	"Pre–Jail Fight"	1:37
3.	"Emotion Of Father–Son"	1:09
4.	"Father's Promise"	1:25
5.	"Son On The Court's Dock"	3:11
6.	"The Red Dragon"	1:14
7.	"AK's Hunt Begins"	2:11
8.	"Prank In The Bank"	1:09
9.	"Babel's Warning"	0:40
10.	"Jammie On The Scene"	1:17
11.	"Jammie's Revenge"	0:54
12.	"AK – King of the Jungle"	0:58
13.	"Destroying The Past"	1:04
Total length:		18:11

== Reception ==
Gopinath Rajendran of The Hindu wrote "GV Prakash's songs might not have hit the bullseye, but his background score amps up the star vehicle." Balakrishna Ganeshan of The News Minute wrote, "The only person who seems to have understood the assignment of this crazy project is GV Prakash. He has delivered afun background music complementing the proceedings." Latha Srinivasan of Hindustan Times wrote "GV Prakash Kumar's background score does justice to Ajith's elevation scenes, and several songs are already chartbusters." Janani K of India Today wrote, "GV Prakash's music turned out good in places and jarring in other places."

== Additional music ==
The film features the following songs: "Ilamai Idho Idho" from Sakalakala Vallavan (1982), "En Jodi Manja Kuruvi" from Vikram (1986), "Oththa Roova" from Nattupura Pattu (1996; which was also remixed), "April Maathathil" from Vaalee (1999), "Aadiyila Kaathadicha" from Villain (2002), "Thottu Thottu Pesum" from Ethirum Puthirum (1999), "Vizhiyil" from Kireedam, and "Aaluma Doluma" from Vedalam (2015). Additionally, an adapted Tamil version of the popular Odia song "Chhi Chhi Chhi Re Nani" and the gaana song "Stove Mela Kadai" were also featured in the film. (Note: Some of the songs were different in the film's theatrical versions in both India and overseas. For instance, in the jail fight sequence with Ajith, the song "Aadiyila Kaathadicha" was played in the overseas version, while the Indian version had the song "Stove Mela Kadai" being played in the same sequence. Similarly, During Jammy's (Arjun Das) entry sequence, the song "En Jodi Manja Kuruvi" is played in the overseas version, while in the Indian version, the sequence is soundtracked with the remix of the same song with lyrics from "Otha Rooba Tharen".)

== Legal issues ==
After the film's release, musician Ilaiyaraaja filed a legal notice against Mythri Movie Makers, the film's production company, for using his compositions—"Ilamai Idho Idho", "En Jodi Manja Kuruvi", and "Oththa Roova"—without obtaining his permission. Noting this violated Section 51 of the Copyright Act of India, he demanded ₹5 crore (US$520,000) compensation, removal of the songs, and a written apology from the producers for the commercial exploitation of his works. Co-producer Y. Ravi Shankar retorted that they followed protocol by obtaining approval from the record labels of the songs since they are the rights holders. Despite this, in late May, Kasthuri Raja, director of Nattupura Pattu, announced his plans to sue the makers for using "Oththa Roova" without his permission. In early September, Ilaiyaraaja filed a case in the Madras High Court against the producers, and on 8 September, the court granted an interim injunction restraining the film from being exhibited with the disputed songs pending resolution of the case. On 3 December, the suit was settled, with Mythri Movie Makers paying Ilayaraaja ₹50 lakh (US$52,000) and removing the songs from the film.

== Personnel ==
- Music composer and producer: G. V. Prakash Kumar
- Programming: Smith Asher
- Chorus: Sugandh Shekar, Shibi Srinivasan, Aravind Annest, Govind Prasad, Abhijith Rao, Velu, Jagadeesh Kumar, Shenbagaraj
- Guitars: Dan Kristen Pandian, Smith Asher, Shiv Paul, Boy MJ
- Trumpets and trombones: Maxwell, Babu
- Studios: Divine Labs, Sounds Right, River Records India, Albuquerque Records, Synergy
- Recording engineers: Roopash Tiwari, Manu Ravichandran, Ashwin George John, Hariharan A, Srinivasan M, R. Ananthakrishnan, Eashwar Venkatesh
- Pre-mixing: Roopash Tiwari
- Mixing and mastering: Jehovahson Alghar
- Musicians' assistance: P. Rajamurugan
