= Good Bad Ugly =

2025 Indian film by Adhik Ravichandran

- Theatrical release poster
- Directed by: Adhik Ravichandran
- Screenplay by: Adhik Ravichandran; B. Hari Krishna; S. J. Arjun; Ravi Kandasamy; Harish Manikandan; K. Raja; V. G. Balasubramanian
- Story by: Adhik Ravichandran
- Produced by: Naveen Yerneni; Y. Ravi Shankar
- Starring: Ajith Kumar; Trisha Krishnan; Arjun Das
- Narrated by: Mahanadi Shankar
- Cinematography: Abinandhan Ramanujam
- Edited by: Vijay Velukutty
- Music by: G. V. Prakash Kumar
- Production company: Mythri Movie Makers
- Distributed by: see below
- Release date: 10 April 2025
- Running time: 139 minutes
- Country: India
- Language: Tamil
- Budget: est. ₹270 crore
- Box office: est. ₹200–248.25 crore (Note: Good Bad Ugly's reported worldwide grosses vary between ₹200 crore (Filmfare) – ₹240 crore (Deccan Chronicle – ₹248.25 crore (The Economic Times, Hindustan Times))

Good Bad Ugly (shortened as GBU) is a 2025 Indian Tamil-language action comedy film directed by Adhik Ravichandran and produced by Mythri Movie Makers, marking their first production in Tamil cinema. The film stars Ajith Kumar in the main lead role, alongside Trisha Krishnan, Arjun Das, Sunil, Prabhu, Prasanna, Karthikeya Dev, Priya Prakash Varrier, Jackie Shroff, Shine Tom Chacko, Tinnu Anand, B. S. Avinash and Raghu Ram. In the film, a retired gangster returns to his violent ways after his son is wrongfully convicted.

Presented by T-Series, the film was announced in late 2023 under the working title AK63, as it is Ajith's 63rd film as lead actor, and the official title was announced in March 2024. Principal photography commenced that May in Hyderabad, followed by a sporadic schedule in Spain, and wrapped by early December. The film featured an original soundtrack composed by G. V. Prakash Kumar, cinematography handled by Abinandhan Ramanujam and editing by Vijay Velukutty.

Good Bad Ugly was released on 10 April 2025 in standard and EPIQ formats. The film opened to mixed reviews from critics who noted that it struggled to balance homages to Ajith's previous films with storytelling but also praised his performance. However, it emerged as the third highest-grossing Tamil film of 2025.

== Plot ==
In 2008, in Mumbai, AK alias "The Red Dragon", a notorious crime boss, voluntarily surrenders to the authorities so that he could reunite and lead a peaceful life with his wife Ramya, a pacifist, and his son, Vihaan.

Eighteen years later, after his release from prison, AK plans to return to Spain to reconcile with his son and family. He plans to visit Vihaan, who lives with Ramya, the chief advisor of the Indian Embassy of Spain, Jayaprakash, her guardian, and Jaeger, her older brother. During their visit, AK faces a group of assassins hired by his enemies, and Ramya warns him to stay away from them. AK summons his associates, including Mastaan Bhai, and warns them to stay away from his family. Tensions rise, and AK warns anyone who threatens his loved ones to face severe consequences.

One day, Jaeger informs AK that the police arrested Vihaan. Jaeger says someone else is involved in Vihaan's arrest, not the Mumbai gang. AK is confronted with a grim reality as he sees Vihaan in handcuffs, facing trial for drug use, and placed in juvenile detention. Ramya blames AK for bringing these dangers into their lives, and she claims it is a form of revenge orchestrated by AK's old enemies. AK visits Vihaan, who reveals that a gang shot his girlfriend, Nithya and drugged him. AK vows to save Vihaan from prison and find the real culprits.

AK, along with his assistant, Tyson, and Jaeger, uncovers that the Dark Wolves gang, led by Babel, is framing Vihaan. They are involved in illegal activities and run a casino and a secure bank vault, which Johnny and Zakaba manage. AK confronts Zakaba and threatens Johnny to leave Vihaan or blow up the entire building. While on a video call, Johnny negotiates with AK to save his casino. However, AK asks him to reveal his younger twin, Jammy, who frames Vihaan in retaliation for Ramya's past imprisonment for heinous crimes against women. She recorded his confession and handed him over to the police. Jammy's twin identities are kept secret, but when Jammy targets Ramya and threatens AK, tension escalates. AK blows up the entire bank and takes Zakaba hostage, destroying the casino and vault.

AK holds Zakaba at gunpoint to use his influence to invite all the gangsters to a party; however, this turns out to be a trap to lure Johnny and Jammy, as the gangsters get killed, including Zakaba. As AK continues his investigation, the twins learn more about AK's past from Bhai. They discover that he had fought alongside the Korean gangsters like Dong Lee, had been in New York with John Wick, had co-planned the infamous Money Heist while in prison with The Professor and ruled Malaysia as a crime boss in the past.

Meanwhile, the twins make matters worse by implicating Vihaan in Nithya's death, complicating the case further. AK learns another startling discovery— Nithya faked her death, is actually Jammy's girlfriend, who had been part of his plan by pretending to love Vihaan and faking the shooting incident. AK catches Jammy and Nithya and holds them hostage. Johnny toys with AK by setting up gangsters to kill Ramya and Vihaan. Priya, AK's ex-girlfriend-turned-aide, saves Ramya, while Tyson, Jaeger and one of the convicts from the Mumbai prison save Vihaan. Johnny, Jammy, and Nithya escape, but the twins decide to kill Nithya as her death would strengthen the case against Vihaan. Hence, despite her pleas, they kill Nithya, and injure Ramya during a chase.

AK visits Ramya at the hospital, who feels remorseful for misjudging AK and her being the cause of Vihaan's incarceration all along, and asks AK to finish the twins. AK confronts Johnny and Jammy and overpowers them in a fight. Johnny and Jammy are sentenced to prison for their crimes, while the court acquits Vihaan, and he reunites with his father for the first time, and the family share a happy reunion.

Six months later, while being transported to prison, Johnny and Jammy escape en route, but AK arrives with a gun in his hand and kills them.

== Cast ==
- Ajith Kumar as AK / Red Dragon
- Trisha Krishnan as Ramya AK
- Arjun Das in a dual role:
  - Jammy
  - Johnny, Jammy's brother
- Prabhu as Jayaprakash
- Prasanna as Jaeger
- Sunil as Baby Tyson
- Jackie Shroff as Babel
- Redin Kingsley as a convict
- Shine Tom Chacko as Shanmuga "Simon"
- Tinnu Anand as Mastaan
- B. S. Avinash as a gangster
- Priya Prakash Varrier as Nithya
- Karthikeya Dev as Vihaan AK
- Sayaji Shinde as IG Alok Shukla
- Raghu Ram as Zacappa
- Usha Uthup as Chief Justice Meera Patnayak
- Rahul Dev as a convict
- Pradeep Kabra as a gangster
- Harry Josh as a gangster
- Ajith Nambiar
- Simran as Priya (cameo appearance)
- Yogi Babu as Babu Yogi (cameo appearance)
- Darkkey Nagaraja as a prisoner (cameo appearance in the song "AK The Tiger")

== Production ==
=== Development ===
While filming for Nerkonda Paarvai in early 2019, Adhik Ravichandran, who acted in the film, narrated a script to its lead actor Ajith Kumar, who agreed to act under his direction but both wanted to wait until the producers were finalised before making an announcement. In the meantime, Ajith worked on Valimai (2022) and Thunivu (2023), while Adhik finished Bagheera and Mark Antony (both 2023). In October 2023, Suresh Chandra, Ajith's manager, confirmed that Adhik was attached to direct the actor's 63rd film, tentatively titled AK63. The following month, he dismissed rumours that Adhik had been removed from the project.

The project was funded by Naveen Yerneni and Y. Ravi Shankar's Mythri Movie Makers, marking their first Tamil venture. The company made a public announcement on 14 March 2024, with the official title Good Bad Ugly, a reference to the 1966 Italian film The Good, the Bad and the Ugly. It was also Ajith's first film since Red (2002) to have an English title; Adhik revealed that the title was suggested by Ajith himself.

The film was made on a reported production budget of up to ₹270 crore (US$29 million). The technical crew includes cinematographer Abinandhan Ramanujam, editor Vijay Velukutty, costume designer Anu Vardhan, and stunt choreographers Supreme Sundar and Kaldian Vodenchardy. Adhik co-wrote the film's script along with Ravi Kandasamy and Harish Manikandan. The film was presented by Bhushan Kumar and Krishan Kumar of T-Series Films, as a larger pact of their deal with Mythri Movie Makers.

=== Casting ===
Ajith reportedly lost kilograms of weight for his character and would sport two different looks. Trisha Krishnan was cast as the lead actress, collaborating opposite Ajith for the sixth time after Ji (2005), Kireedam (2007), Mankatha (2011), Yennai Arindhaal (2015) and Vidaamuyarchi (2025). Sunil was cast in a supporting role, collaborating with Adhik for the second time after Mark Antony, whilst Rahul Dev was also cast, after having previously acted with Ajith in Vedalam (2015). B. S. Avinash was further cast in an important role.

In early October, Prasanna announced his participation. Later the same month, Arjun Das did the same. Prabhu and Yogi Babu were present during the film's preliminary shooting, confirming their presence in the film. In late January 2025, Shine Tom Chacko announced he was part of the cast. Simran was reported to make a cameo appearance in her first film with Ajith since Unnai Kodu Ennai Tharuven (2000) and fourth film overall. This was confirmed with the trailer launch on 4 April 2025. From the trailer, Jackie Shroff, Sayaji Shinde, Tinnu Anand, Usha Uthup, Redin Kingsley and Priya Prakash Varrier were also confirmed to be part of the cast. Naslen was originally offered to play Ajith's son, but declined due to scheduling conflicts with Alappuzha Gymkhana (2025); the role went to Karthikeya Dev.

=== Filming ===
Principal photography was initially scheduled to begin in June 2024. However, due to the filming schedule of Vidaamuyarchi in late May was scheduled in the United Arab Emirates, the first schedule instead began on 9 May in Hyderabad. A fight sequence, choreographed by Supreme Sundar, was filmed at first, according to reports. The schedule was completed within a month on 9 June. The team then continued filming for the second schedule in Hyderabad on early August, with Ajith simultaneously participating the shoot of this film and Vidaamuyarchi.

Although initial plans were to go to South America for the concurrent schedule, it took place in Spain instead. During this schedule, however, photos and videos of Ajith were leaked to the social media platforms. Toledo House in Toledo, Spain, which was a principal location in the Spanish TV series Money Heist, features in the film. In late-November, production moved to the United Kingdom as a part of the major schedule. Filming wrapped in mid-December.

=== Post-production ===
Visual effects for the film were provided by Matrix VFX, with Narendra Logisa serving as the visual effects supervisor. Annapurna Studios handled the digital intermediate, with Ashwath S as the colourist. On 29 December 2024, Ajith completed dubbing for his portions.

== Music ==
The soundtrack is composed by G. V. Prakash Kumar, in his third collaboration with Adhik after Trisha Illana Nayanthara (2015) and Mark Antony (2023); second with Ajith after Kireedam (2007). Prakash replaced the previously announced Devi Sri Prasad. The audio rights of the film were acquired by T-Series. The first single titled "OG Sambavam" was released on 18 March 2025. The second single titled "God Bless U" was released on 30 March 2025. The third single titled "AK The Tiger" was released on 9 April 2025.

== Marketing ==
The film's teaser trailer, released on 28 February 2025, received over 32 million views within 24 hours of its release, thus becoming the most viewed Tamil film teaser to that point. The theatrical trailer was released on 4 April 2025, and was noted by critics for its numerous callbacks to Ajith's previous films, especially those films' popular dialogues. Adhik later stated that these callbacks were meant as nostalgia for long-time Ajith fans, but could also resonate with general audiences if they enjoy them as "impactful, mass-appeal dialogues" without having prior knowledge of Ajith's films.

== Release ==
=== Theatrical ===
Good Bad Ugly was released theatrically on 10 April 2025 in standard and EPIQ formats. Apart from the original Tamil language, it was also scheduled to release in the Telugu, Hindi, Kannada and Malayalam languages. The film was released in multiplexes of North India as a part of its Hindi release with a similar 8-week streaming rule followed by Kanguva (2024).

Initially, the film was scheduled to release on 10 January 2025, coinciding with the occasion of Pongal. However, after Lyca Productions, producers of Vidaamuyarchi, announced in November 2024 that their film would release during the Pongal weekend, the release of Good Bad Ugly was facing uncertainty as Naveen Yerneni did not confirm or deny any new release window. In December, Adhik confirmed that the film was postponed, but the makers of Vidaamuyarchi also soon after announced that their film was postponed, leading to none of the films being released on the occasion, with the April 2025 release window for Good Bad Ugly being announced in early January.

=== Distribution ===
Romeo Pictures bought the distribution rights of the film in Tamil Nadu. They initially held the same rights for Karnataka and Kerala as well, but KVN Productions later acquired the Karnataka rights, and Sree Gokulam Movies did so for Kerala. Prathyangira Cinemas acquired the distribution rights for the United States.

=== Pre-bookings ===
Good Bad Ugly sold 645+ tickets for its opening day in Norway, surpassing Vidaamuyarchi and becoming the highest opening for an Ajith-starrer at the location.

=== Home media ===
The post-theatrical streaming rights of the film were purchased by Netflix for ₹95 crore. The film began streaming there from 8 May 2025 in Tamil and dubbed versions in Telugu, Hindi, Kannada and Malayalam languages. while the satellite rights were bagged by Sony Vizha

== Reception ==
=== Critical response ===
Good Bad Ugly received mixed reviews from critics, who noted that the film struggled to balance homage and storytelling.

Ganesh Aaglave of Firstpost gave 3.5/5 stars and wrote "On the whole, Good Bad Ugly is a big-ticket entertainer and a visual treat for Thala Ajith fans." M Suganth of The Times of India gave 3/5 stars and wrote "It is cinema of maximalism, often breaking the third wall, peppered with throwbacks, and with only one goal – to deliver a high every few minutes. More than mass masala, it's max masala!" Avinash Ramachandran of The Indian Express gave 3/5 stars and wrote "Even if the writing is shallow, and most of the performances, except an Ajith showreel for the ages, are functional, the film is gloriously engaging."

Sudhir Srinivasan of Cinema Express gave 3/5 stars and wrote "Adhik Ravichandran turns Good Bad Ugly into a chaotic shrine to nostalgia and heroism. It’s a party you can dance through, if you're in the mood." Bhawana Tanmayi of Moneycontrol gave 2.5/5 stars and wrote "The film completely lacks its main core, which is its storytelling point of view, the lack of emotional core and why we should root for the hero, and, obviously, the film consists of the never-ending slow-motion walks and gunfires. Anusha Sundar of OTTPlay gave 2.5/5 stars and wrote "GBU is a fanboy cinema, and has its right theatre moments and Easter eggs, if that's all you want to enjoy a film. GBU takes slow to find a pace in its writing. At times, it fumbles too evidently."

Janani K of India Today gave 2.5/5 stars and wrote "Good Bad Ugly is what you call a 'fanboy sambavam'. If you are an ardent Ajith Kumar fan, this will be a treat for you. But, if you are expecting even a little bit of a story, you'd be in for disappointment. It's all over-the-top. Be it dialogues or the staging." Raisa Nasreen of Times Now gave 2.5/5 stars and wrote "Over all, Adhik deliver what they promised fans – a film which is a treat for fans but is a masterclass on good storytelling?"

Latha Srinivasan of Hindustan Times wrote "Good Bad Ugly ultimately plays out as a fanboy tribute from Adhik Ravichandran to Ajith Kumar—packed with style, action, and star power, even if it falls short on storytelling." Vishal Menon of The Hollywood Reporter India wrote, "One is unsure if it's even ethical to call Good Bad Ugly a feature film. From a safe distance, one can argue that it's the length of a regular movie and it also features a major movie star in the lead. If you want to push it, one may even argue that it has a something resembling a plot and a screenplay that holds characters and plot points in place." Gopinath Rajendran of The Hindu wrote "Adhik has taken his biggest shot, and it could possibly be the best fan service Tamil cinema has ever seen. Even when it’s far from perfect and feels like a brass-knuckle punch to our senses, Good Bad Ugly is loving work of nostalgia."

=== Box office ===
Good Bad Ugly grossed ₹50 crore (US$5.3 million)–₹51 crore (US$5.4 million) worldwide on its opening day, with over ₹34 crore (US$3.6 million) from India, becoming the highest first-day gross for the actor, surpassing Valimai (2022), which grossed ₹47 crore (US$5.0 million). It had the third biggest opening for an Indian film in 2025, behind Game Changer and L2: Empuraan. The film grossed £96,000 (US$131,506.85) in the United Kingdom, surpassing Vidaamuyarchi, which grossed £86,000 (US$117,808.22), and became the highest first-day grosser for the actor in the country.

The film added another ₹24 crore (US$2.6 million) on its second day, raising the total collection to ₹80 crore (US$8.5 million) worldwide. It crossed the ₹100 crore mark within three days, becoming the fastest film of the actor to do so. The film grossed ₹152 crore worldwide in its first four-day weekend. It also became the first film of the actor to enter the global weekend chart of Comscore emerging as the number four film of the global box-office weekend. The film made a total collection of ₹200 crore (US$21 million) within nine days, surpassing Thunivu (2023) and becoming Ajith's highest-grossing film.

Good Bad Ugly concluded its theatrical run with worldwide gross estimated to be ₹340–356crore. According to the film's distributor, the film grossed 172 crore in Tamilnadu box-office within 2 weeks, estimated ₹210 crore final collection in Tamil Nadu and 356 crores world wide It emerged as the second highest-grossing Tamil film of 2025, 26th highest-grossing Tamil film of all time and 52nd highest-grossing South Indian film of all time.

== Controversies ==
Ahead of the release of the film, a group of Ajith's fans from Tirunelveli attempted to install a 285-ft cutout of the actor at PSS multiplex. The structure collapsed during installation, but no injuries were reported. A video of the incident went viral online.

Post release, music composer Ilaiyaraaja sent a notice to the makers for using and altering his compositions "Ilamai Idho Idho" from Sakalakala Vallavan (1982), "En Jodi Manja Kuruvi" from Vikram (1986) and "Oththa Roova" from Nattupura Pattu (1996) in the film without his permission. Accusing them of violating Section 51 of the Copyright Act of India, he sought ₹5 crore (equivalent to ₹5.2 crore or US$550,000 in 2026) for "unpaid royalties, damages, and legal costs", and also demanded the removal of the altered songs from wherever they were published. Y. Ravi Shankar decried these allegations, saying they had followed protocol by obtaining approval from the record labels of the songs since they are the rights holders. Following this, on 8 September 2025, the Madras High Court granted an interim injunction restraining the producers from exhibiting, distributing or broadcasting the film with the disputed songs on any platforms, including its streaming platform, Netflix. Justice N. Senthilkumar noted that the production house's response to Ilaiyaraaja's legal notice lacked sufficient evidence of authentication and failed to specify the claimed permissions. The court observed that the songs had been "used, altered, and commercially exploited" without the composer's consent, thereby warranting temporary relief in favour of the plaintiff until further proceedings. Shortly thereafter, the film was removed from Netflix. The producers then appealed to the court to vacate the injunction, while Ilaiyaraaja was given a week's time to file a counter affidavit. Amidst all this, the film was reinstated on Netflix with new music in place of the objected songs.
