= Rokesh =

Tamil lyricist

- Born: 1993 (age 32–33); Chennai
- Citizenship: India
- Occupation: Lyricist
- Years active: (2015-present)

Rokesh is an Indian lyricist who works in Tamil cinema, specializing in song lyrics containing Madras Bashai. His notable songs include "Aaluma Doluma" from Vedalam (2015), "Danga Maari Oodhari" from Anegan (2015), "Jithu Jilladi" from Theri (2016), and "Jalabulajangu" from Don (2022).

== Career ==
Rokesh worked as a machine operator in the Parry's area of Chennai and had established a reputation for being a gana songwriter in his local area, Vyasarpadi. He was first introduced to K. V. Anand and Harris Jayaraj by D. R. K. Kiran, who worked as the art director for Anand's film Anegan (2015). Anand and Harris gave Rokesh a list of 150 words of North Madras specific vocabulary for reference and explained the situation for a song, and Rokesh returned with the final version of "Danga Maari Oodhari" during the next day.

Rokesh has since gone on to collaborate with other music directors, such as G. V. Prakash Kumar, Anirudh Ravichander, and D. Imman.

== Filmography ==
Year	Film	Song	Composer	Singers
2015	Anegan	"Danga Maari Oodhari"	Harris Jayaraj	Dhanush, Marana Gana Viji, Naveen Madhav
2015	Romeo Juliet	"Dandanakka"	D. Imman	Anirudh Ravichander
2015	Maari	"Bagulu Odayam Dagulu Mari"	Anirudh Ravichander	Dhanush
2015	Vasuvum Saravananum Onna Padichavanga	"Lucka Maattikkichi"	D. Imman	Dholak Gana Jagan, Senthildass Velayutham, Palaniammal
2015	Trisha Illana Nayanthara	"Bittu Padam Di"	G. V. Prakash Kumar	G. V. Prakash Kumar, Kalyani Pradeep, Saindhavi
2015	Trisha Illana Nayanthara	"Dakalti"	G. V. Prakash Kumar	Andrea Jeremiah, Anthony Daasan, Gana Bala
2015	Vedalam	"Aaluma Doluma"	Anirudh Ravichander	Anirudh Ravichander, Badshah
2016	Pugazh	"Sharpu Gangu"	Vivek-Mervin	Mervin Solomon, Vivek Siva
2016	Theri	"Jithu Jilladi"	G. V. Prakash Kumar	Deva, Balachandran
2016	Paisa	"Chikku Mukku"	JV	Mukesh Mohamed, Hemambika
2016	TNPL Anthem	"Damkutta Dumkutla"	Anirudh Ravichander	Anirudh Ravichander, Shabareesh Varma
2016	Veera Sivaji	"Thaarumaaru Thakkaalisoru"	D. Imman	Silambarasan
2017	Bogan	"Damaalu Dumeelu"	D. Imman	Anirudh Ravichander
2017	Neruppu Da	"Karukku Kallangolu"	Sean Roldan	Anirudh Ravichander
2017	Neruppu Da	"Andha Madhiri Ponna"	Sean Roldan	Ravi G
2017	Sathya	"Sangu (Area Version)"	Simon K. King	Simon K. King
2017	Sakka Podu Podu Raja	"Kalakku Machaan"	Silambarasan	Anirudh Ravichander
2018
2018	Kalakalappu 2	"Oru Kuchi Oru Kulfi"	Hiphop Tamizha	Gana Vinoth, Saravedi Saran
2018	Semma Botha Aagathey	"Semma Botha Aagathey"	Yuvan Shankar Raja	Yuvan Shankar Raja
2018	Semma Botha Aagathey	"Itemkaaran"	Yuvan Shankar Raja	Ranjith, Anitha Karthikeyan
2018	Koothan	"Monkistha Kinkistha"	Balz_G	T. Rajendar, Shenbagaraj, Shajani
2018	Vada Chennai	"Goindhammavaala"	Santhosh Narayanan	Dhanush
2018	CSK Album	"Mudincha Jeichiparru"	Naren Balakumar	Mukesh Mohamed, Sharanya Srinivas
2019	Ayogya	"Vera Level U"	S. Thaman	Deepak, Pooja Vaidyanath
2019	Mr. Local	"Menaminiki"	Hiphop Tamizha	Benny Dayal, Snigdha Chandra
2019	Market Raja MBBS	"Dha Dha"	Simon K. King	Simon K. King
2019	A1	"Chitukku Chitukku"	Santhosh Narayanan	Santhosh Narayanan
2019	A1	"Priya Priya"	Santhosh Narayanan	Gana Muthu, Isaivani
2019	Thirupathisamy Kudumbam	"Jigidi Kaati"	Sam D. Raj	Nirmal
2019	Hero	"Malto Kithapuleh"	Yuvan Shankar Raja	Shyam Vishwanathan
2020	Utraan	"Super Chudidhaaru"	N. R. Raghunanthan	Gana Sudhakar
2020	Utraan	"Varatchiya Vadiniruntha"	N. R. Raghunanthan	Gana Sudhakar
2021	Parris Jeyaraj	"Bacha Bachikey"	Santhosh Narayanan	Santhosh Narayanan
2021	Parris Jeyaraj	"Kaava Ulla"	Santhosh Narayanan	Gana Muthu
2021	Parris Jeyaraj	"Puli Manga Pulip"	Santhosh Narayanan	Asal Kolaar
2021	Parris Jeyaraj	"Priya Priya"	Santhosh Narayanan	Gana Muthu, Isaivani
2021	Devadas Brothers	"Devadas Brothers Theme Song"	Dharan Kumar	Chorus
2021	Sivakumarin Sabadham	"Middle Class"	Hiphop Tamizha	Bamba Bakya
2022	Ayngaran	"Taan Addi"	G. V. Prakash Kumar	Rajaganapathy, Anthony Daasan, V. M. Mahalingam
2022	Don	"Jalabulajangu"	Anirudh Ravichander	Anirudh Ravichander
2022	Sardar	"Inky Pinky Ponky"	G. V. Prakash Kumar	Arivu, Santhosh Hariharan
2023	Bagheera	"Kuch Kuch Hota Hai"	Ganesan S	Thaman S, Ganesan S
2023	Mark Antony	"I Love You Di"	G. V. Prakash Kumar	Adhik Ravichandran
2024	Indian 2	"Kadharalz"	Anirudh Ravichander	Anirudh Ravichander
2024	Miss You	"Sonnaru Naina"	Ghibran Vaibodha	Santhosh Narayanan, Siddharth
2025	Good Bad Ugly	"God Bless U"	G. V. Prakash Kumar	Anirudh Ravichander, Paal Dabba
2025	Diesel	"Beer Song"	Dhibu Ninan Thomas	Gana Guna
2026	Love Insurance Kompany	"Adaavadi"	Anirudh Ravichander	Mathichiyam Bala
2026	Om	"Alaakaa Loova"	Sai Abhyankkar	Sai Abhyankkar
