= Magudam (2026 film) =

2026 film directed by Vishal

- Theatrical release poster
- Directed by: Vishal
- Screenplay by: Vishal
- Story by: Ravi Arasu
- Dialogues by: Pon Parthiban; Vishal; Anandh Kumaresan
- Produced by: B. Suresh; R. B. Jeevan Choudary; Jithan Ramesh; Jiiva
- Starring: Vishal; Anjali; Dushara Vijayan
- Cinematography: Richard M. Nathan; Abinandhan Ramanujam
- Edited by: N. B. Srikanth
- Music by: G. V. Prakash Kumar
- Production company: Super Good Films
- Release date: 14 August 2026
- Running time: 185 minutes
- Country: India
- Language: Tamil

Magudam (transl. Crown) is a 2026 Indian Tamil-language action drama film written and directed by Vishal (in his directorial debut) from a story by Ravi Arasu and dialogues by Pon Parthiban, Vishal, and Anandh Kumaresan. Produced by Super Good Films, the film stars Vishal in dual roles, alongside Anjali and Dushara Vijayan.

The film was officially announced in July 2025 under the tentative title Vishal35, and the official title was announced in August 2025. Principal photography began in Chennai on 1 August 2025 and wrapped in June 2026. The film has music composed by G. V. Prakash Kumar, cinematography handled by Richard M. Nathan, Abinandhan Ramanujam and Jai Karthik; and editing by N. B. Srikanth.

Magudam was released theatrically on 14 August 2026, during the Independence Day weekend and received negative reviews from critics. The film was a box office bomb failing to recoup even half it's production and marketing costs.

== Plot ==
In Madras in 1965, a young boy narrowly escapes from a ruthless child-trafficking ring and flees to Visakhapatnam. Struggling to survive on the dangerous streets of Vizag, he befriends a young boy, Jana, who was escaping thugs. On the beach, the two sit down, and the young boy sees a container ship in the distance and says that he will one day

Kirubakaran is a struggling medical representative at Foster Pharma Company who loses pharmaceutical procurement contracts with hospitals. He lives with his wife, Jamuna and his two children, a daughter and a son. Jamuna. His father-in-law visits him in Chennai and believes he has a car. To satisfy his father-in-law and his children, Kiruba decides to buy a car. He visits many showrooms, but the sales representatives do not give him a loan due to his low salary and his inability to pay a previous EMI on a washing machine, which hurts him and his family. Eventually, he buys a used white BMW car for Rs. 5 lakhs.

Meanwhile, in Visakhapatnam, Linga, a ruthless crime boss and gangster, buys his 5th ship, and Jana and Pazham reflect on what he said in 1965. He meets with Chera, Martin and Lala. Chera discusses unloading a valuable shipment from Taiwan. Linga refuses to let them or anyone unload it, due to the contents of the shipment. This decision angers Chera, who agrees with a sait to unload the goods.

On a road trip to Ooty with his family, a lorry tries to kill them, but Kiruba escapes. The thugs see the car that originally belonged to Chera. After a phone call between the thugs and Chera, Chera then calls his henchman, Coonoor Jaya, who tells him to follow the car. Jaya then takes a photo of the driver. Chera uses this opportunity to kill Kiruba. Later, while Kiruba is driving, Coonoor Jaya and his henchmen open fire and kill Kiruba's wife and daughter. Kiruba and his son escape to the forest, and Kiruba fights the henchmen, killing them and eventually stabs Coonoor Jaya, killing him. At the funeral of Kiruba's wife and daughter, Linga arrives with Jana and his men; in anger, Kiruba tells Linga to leave because of Linga's actions, and Linga's past is revealed.

Thirty years ago, Linga grows up alongside his best friend, Jana. After a confrontation with Malli, Bhagawan's brother, Linga is entrusted by Bhagawan to manage the harbour, where he, Jana, and their gang begin handling shipments. Linga hires a beggar named Pazham as his driver. However, a tragedy strikes when a shipment of faulty duplicate car parts leads to the death of Linga's friend, Arasu. So Linga destroys the goods. Linga then finds love with Annapoorani, who reciprocates his feelings, and they marry, later welcoming a baby boy. Meanwhile, Bhagawan partners with a foreign businessman to utilise a secret tunnel from the British era, allowing illegal goods to be moved undetected. Annapoorani opposes this plan, as the tunnel runs beneath their fish market. This ultimately leads to her murder by Bhagawan's brother. Before her death, she asks Linga to protect the market's people and keep the truth about her sacrifice hidden from their son, Kiruba, to shield him from the dangerous reality she faced to save their community. Linga eventually hangs the businessman, the local MLA, Bhagawan and his brother.

In the present day, Linga kills Chera's henchmen, straps Chera to a chair after beating him up and burns him alive. Lala fears that Linga will kill him if he unloads the goods, so he refuses to cooperate with Martin, who then kills Lala. Martin sends mercenaries to Linga's house, Linga sends Pazham away, and the mercenaries eventually kill Linga. Pazham informs Jana about Linga's death, and Kiruba learns from his mother's Walkman recording that Linga never abandoned him and had stayed away to protect him and Linga's sacrifice. Realising that he had misunderstood his father, Kiruba forgives Linga and regrets blaming him for his mother's death.

Jana, Anbu, Linga's henchman, Pazham, Jana and Kiruba finally confront Martin. Kiruba fights and kills Martin's men before confronting Martin himself. The women, who were Annapoorani's friends, kill Martin, avenging Annapoorani's death.

== Cast ==
- Vishal in a dual role as:
  - Kirubakaran "Kiruba", a medical representative and Linga's son
  - Don Lingappa "Linga", a dangerous crime boss and Kiruba's father
- Anjali as Annapoorani, Linga's wife and Kiruba's mother
- Dushara Vijayan as Jamuna, Kiruba's wife and Linga's daughter-in-law
- Mayah Prem as Maya, Kiruba and Jamuna's daughter (Linga's grandson)
- Ashwin Madhavan as Iniyan, Kiruba and Jamuna's son (Linga's grandson)
- John Vijay as Jana, Linga's best friend
- Jayaprakash as Pazham, Linga and Jana's driver
- Java Sundaresan as car driver
- Thambi Ramaiah as Thambi Durai, Kiruba's father-in-law and Jamuna's father
- Arjai as Bhuvana, Kiruba's childhood friend
- Vamsi Krishna as Malli, Bhagawan's brother
- Ajay as Chera
- Abu Salim as Martin
- Sabumon Abdusamad as Lala
- Padam Kumar as Bhagawan
- VJ Jhansi as Annapoorani's friend
- Saravana Subbiah as car showroom manager
- Sabbita Roi as Annapoorani's friend
- Lollu Sabha Maaran as police officer

== Production ==
=== Development ===
After the release of Madha Gaja Raja in 2025, Vishal was announced to collaborate with director Ravi Arasu for an action film. The film was the 35th film of Vishal and was tentatively titled Vishal35. The film was produced by R. B. Choudary's Super Good Films, marking their 99th venture. The technical team consists of music composer G. V. Prakash Kumar, cinematographer Richard M. Nathan, editor N. B. Srikanth and production designer G Durairaj.

For unknown reasons, there had previously been reports that Vishal would succeed Ravi Arasu as the film's director. The rumour was confirmed through a second look poster that released on 20 October 2025, coinciding Diwali, marking Vishal's debut as the director. Additionally, Vishal stated that he plans to remake the film and that the director change was brought about by creative differences.

=== Casting ===
Dushara Vijayan was cast in as the female lead. The film also stars Thambi Ramaiah and Arjai in important roles. Before the second schedule, Dhilip Subbarayan was announced to be a part of the film. On 21 August, during the second schedule, Anjali was announced in an important role, reuniting with Vishal after Madha Gaja Raja. During the title announcement, Yogi Babu was revealed to be part of the cast.

=== Filming ===
Earlier Cinema Vikatan reported that the shooting is scheduled to commence in the second week of April in Chennai followed by other locations such as Visakhapatnam and Jaipur. The film was launched in Chennai on 14 July 2025 after a formal muhurat pooja. After the completion of the first schedule which began on 1 August, the second schedule began in mid-August in Ooty. During the third schedule in Chennai, Vishal stepped in as director due to Ravi Arasu's temporary absence. The third schedule began again in Ooty on 15 September 2025. Few days later, on 18 September 2025, Dushara was announced to have completed filming her portions in the film. The following schedule started to shoot the action scenes at TR Gardens, where T. Rajendar, the owner of TR Gardens, visited the location and shared moments with Vishal. Simultaneously during the filming of the climax, Vishal began dubbing for his portions in late-October 2025. Filming got halted in late-October 2025. Filming resumed after a few days in a studio in Panaiyur. After 17 days of climax shoot, the entire filming got wrapped on 14 November 2025. However, reshoots took place and ended in June 2026.

== Music ==
The film has music and background score composed by G. V. Prakash Kumar, marking his third collaboration with Vishal after Naan Sigappu Manithan (2014) and Mark Antony (2023).The audio rights were acquired by his own label. The first single titled "Rise of Linga" was released on 19 June 2026. The second single titled "Nachindhi Machanane" was released on 28 June 2026. The third single titled "Kalangaadhe" was released on 27 July 2026. The last single titled "Kaathaaga Vaazhaporen" was released on 5 August 2026.The pre-release audio launch event was held on 8 August 2026 at Kalaivanar Arangam, Chennai. The film also features the remix version of the cult song, "Muthumani Maala" from Chinna Gounder (1992), featuring in an action sequence. The entire soundtrack album was released on 1 September 2026, after the film's release.

Tamil
No.	Title	Lyrics	Singer(s)	Length
1.	"Rise of Linga"	V7H	V7H; G. V. Prakash Kumar	3:24
2.	"Nachindhi Machanane"	Ekadasi	Mangli; Velmurugan	3:58
3.	"Kalangaadhe"	Karunakaran	G. V. Prakash Kumar	3:12
4.	"Kaathaaga Vaazhaporen"	Vivek	Haricharan; Meghna Sumesh	2:01
5.	"Paar Paar Paar"	Uma Devi	A. R. Reihana	3:50
6.	"Anbe En Anbe"	Karunakaran	Raja Ganapathy	1:39
7.	"Yenge Nee Yenge"	Karunakaran	Raja Ganapathy	1:37
Total length:				19:41

Telugu
No.	Title	Lyrics	Singer(s)	Length
1.	"Rise of Linga"	Kalyan Ram	Vishal; G. V. Prakash Kumar; V7H (Rap)	3:24
2.	"Nachchaake Vachera"	Bhuvana Chandra	Prabha	3:58
3.	"Kalatheylaa"	Rajshri Sudhakar	Krishna Tejasvi	3:12
4.	"Ee Bhoomi Endhalani"	Chandrabose	Nakul Abhyankar; Joshika Bandi	2:01
5.	"Sye Sye Sye"	Ramajogayya Sastry	A. R. Reihana	3:50
6.	"Nuvve Naa Praanam Nuvve"	Kalyan Ram	Krishna Tejasvi	1:39
7.	"Naa Praanam Nuvve Gaa"	Kalyan Ram	Krishna Tejasvi	1:37
Total length:				19:48

== Release ==
=== Theatrical ===
Magudam was released in theatres on 14 August 2026, clashing with Vishwanath & Sons.

New Surya Films and Abhilash Pillai are responsible for the film's distribution in Kerala. Malik Streams is the distributor of this film in Malaysia.

=== Marketing ===
The title reveal teaser was released on 24 August 2025, revealing the film's title to be Magudam in Tamil and Makutam in Telugu.

=== Home media ===
The film began streaming on Amazon Prime Video from 11 September 2026.

== Reception ==
=== Critical response ===
Magudam received negative reviews from critics.

Latha Srinivasan of NDTV gave 2/5 stars and wrote, "Magudam is an over-ambitious and yet under-whelming film from Vishal. The film really struggles to overcome its flaws and ends up as a disappointing directorial debut for the Tamil star". Roopa Radhakrishnan of The Times of India gave 2/5 stars and wrote, "Magudam doesn't end up being the epic that it aspires to be. It is a reminder that not every actor should turn director, and vice versa".

Akshay Kumar of Cinema Express gave 2/5 stars and wrote, "From being a meek hero with recognisable problems like EMI and a car, to the plasticity with which he is made the saviour, the film defies even the template of a nobody rising above the ranks. Magudam ends up being a heavy crown on a shaky head". Yashaswini Sri of The Indian Express gave 2/5 stars and wrote, "For Vishal fans, the action delivers and the climax alone is worth showing up for. For general audiences, it is a mixed bag: engaging in stretches, testing in others, and at more than three hours, asking for more patience than it always earns. As a first film behind the camera, though, Magudam shows that Vishal has more to offer as a filmmaker than just his fists".

=== Box office ===
The film reportedly grossed ₹2.10 crore from India in three days from 4142 shows. The film was a commercial failure. According to Dinamalar, almost all theatres pulled the film by the second week.

== Dispute ==
In October 2025, due to the conflict between Vishal and Ravi Arasu escalating, FEFSI and the Directors Association jointly halted the filming, announcing to resume only if Vishal receives a No Objection Certificate from Ravi Arasu to direct it, replacing the latter. On 1 November, Vishal posted a BTS video showing the filming of the climax scenes in an effort to quell such rumours from appearing in the media. Soon after, R. K. Selvamani, the President of FEFSI announced that the dispute has been settled after the director agreed to step away from the project.
