= Anbanavan Asaradhavan Adangadhavan =

2017 film by Adhik Ravichandran

- Theatrical release poster
- Directed by: Adhik Ravichandran
- Written by: Adhik Ravichandran
- Produced by: S. Michael Rayappan
- Starring: Silambarasan; Shriya Saran; Tamannaah Bhatia
- Cinematography: Krishnan Vasant
- Edited by: Ruben
- Music by: Yuvan Shankar Raja
- Production company: Global Infotainment
- Distributed by: T-Series Films
- Release date: 23 June 2017
- Running time: 136 minutes
- Country: India
- Language: Tamil

Anbanavan Asaradhavan Adangadhavan (transl. The affectionate, uncompromising / unflinching, uncontrollable man), also known as AAA, is a 2017 Indian Tamil-language romantic action comedy film, directed by Adhik Ravichandran and produced by S. Michael Rayappan. The film stars Silambarasan in dual roles, along with Shriya Saran and Tamannaah Bhatia. Anbanavan Asaradhavan Adangadhavan was shot between July 2016 and June 2017. The film has music composed by Yuvan Shankar Raja, with Krishnan Vasant and Ruben handling the cinematography and editing, respectively. It was released on 23 June 2017 to negative critical reviews, and failed at the box office.

== Plot ==
In Dubai, a cop named Ruby interrogates a pensioner. In an attempt to capture the dreaded don Michael. The man narrates Michael's story. In 1992, in Madurai, Tamil Nadu, Madurai Michael is a notorious thug who works for a smuggler named Senthamarai and kills for money. He spends his time with his sidekicks, Somu and Sabi. Michael falls for Selvi, a girl from his town. Selvi rejects him initially but later reciprocates his love. She asks him to leave his gangster life and relocate to Dubai, starting a new life. Michael half-heartedly accepts this. However, an enemy from the same gang backstabs Michael by turning into a witness for many murders committed by Michael, and the latter is in jail.

Michael then escapes prison with the help of his friends and finds out that Selvi is soon to marry a man of her parents' choice. Understanding that he must be on the run forever, Michael leaves Selvi and migrates to Dubai, where he rises to become a dreaded gangster. Back in Dubai, Sabi dies soon after narrating the story. Ruby and the other cops figure out that Michael will be over 50 years old and will be fearing for his life, hiding somewhere. They focus on Chennai and send Michael's photo to the police in Chennai. But Michael is revealed to live lavishly and happily in Chennai under the name "Ashwin Thatha".

Ashwin has all the money he wants except for a woman. So he decides to get married. While interviewing probable brides, he falls in love with a much younger girl called Ramya. She and her father run a retirement home. Ashwin mistakes Ramya's friendly talks as a reciprocation of his love and is ecstatic when she decides to tell her father about her love. At a ceremony, Ramya informs her father that she loves someone and wants to marry him, but the age difference might be problematic. To Ashwin's surprise, Ramya introduces a younger man, Shiva, who looks like Ashwin. It turns out that Shiva is only a few years younger than Ramya, and they pursue a long-distance relationship. He is settled in the US.

A heartbroken Ashwin, overwhelmed by his emotions, resorts to drinking and becomes increasingly angry. In his desperation, he kidnaps Shiva. To further his plan, he hires a prominent makeup artist to transform his appearance, intending to use their resemblance to pose as Shiva and win over Ramya.

== Cast ==
Adapted from the opening credits:

- Silambarasan as:
  - Madurai Michael/Ashwin Thatha
  - Thikku Shiva
- Shriya Saran as Selvi
- Tamannaah Bhatia as Ramya
- Kovai Sarala as Sarala
- VTV Ganesh as Somu
- Rajendran as Mani / Raju
- Y. G. Mahendran as "Current" Murugan
- Mahat Raghavendra as Sabi
- Shanmugasundaram as Nattamai
- Pandu as doctor
- Neelu as Neelu Thatha
- Swaminathan as Swami Thatha
- Lollu Sabha Manohar as Manohar Thatha
- Pasanga Sivakumar as Sivakumar
- "Sengal Psycho" Ramkumar
- Ravichandran Kandhaswamy as Ramya's father

Cameo appearances

- Kasthuri Shankar as Agent Ruby
- Vijayakumar
- G. V. Prakash Kumar as Jeeva
- Adhik Ravichandran as himself

== Production ==
In February 2016, Adhik Ravichandran announced that his second directorial project would star Silambarasan, with several crew members from his earlier film Trisha Illana Nayanthara returning. Yuvan Shankar Raja was appointed as the music composer in June 2016. Trisha was considered for a leading female role but did not accept the project. Shriya Saran was instead cast. The film's title Anbanavan Asaradhavan Adangadhavan was announced in May 2016. Silambarasan gained weight and grew a beard for one of his roles. Filming began in July 2016, and was mostly complete by early June 2017, with only a song sequence remaining.

== Music ==
Anbanavan Asaradhavan Adangadhavan

Soundtrack album by Yuvan Shankar Raja
- Released: 2017
- Genre: Feature film soundtrack
- Length: 26:11
- Language: Tamil
- Label: Lahari Music
- Producer: Yuvan Shankar Raja

Yuvan Shankar Raja chronology
Kadamban (2017)	Anbanavan Asaradhavan Adangadhavan (2017)	Gowdru Hotel (2017)

Singles from Anbanavan Asaradhavan Adangadhavan
- 1. "Trend Song" Released: 30 December 2016; 2. "Rottula Vandi Oduthu" Released: 2 June 2017

External audio
- Anbanavan Asaradhavan Adangadhavan Audio Jukebox on YouTube

The film's music was composed by Yuvan Shankar Raja. The first single, "Trend Song", was released as a New Year special on 30 December 2016. The next single, "Rottula Vandi Oodudhu", with lyrics by Silambarasan and sung by Ilaiyaraaja, was released on 2 June 2017. The album features seven tracks, three of which are instrumental.

Track listing
No.	Title	Lyrics	Singer(s)	Length
1.	"Trend Song"	Silambarasan	Silambarasan	6:05
2.	"Rottula Vandi Oodudhu"	Silambarasan	Ilaiyaraaja	4:35
3.	"Ratham En Ratham"	Vairamuthu	Silambarasan	4:15
4.	"Ashwin Thatha Theme" (Instrumental)	–	–	2:56
5.	"Madura Michael Theme" (Instrumental)	–	–	1:59
6.	"Retro Romance Theme" (Instrumental)	–	–	3:09
7.	"Thatha Love"	Silambarasan	Yuvan Shankar Raja	3:38
Total length:				26:41

== Release and reception ==
Anbanavan Asaradhavan Adangadhavan was theatrically released worldwide on 23 June 2017, coinciding with Eid al-Fitr, and received generally negative reviews from critics.

Sify called the film "a B-grade crowd-pleaser that knows exactly who its audience is. For die-hard fans of STR it is a treat". Thinkal Menon from The Times of India rated 2 out of 5, stating that "A suspense cameo towards the end makes things worse as the film, by then, makes one yawn unapologetically." Sreedhar Pillai, for Firstpost, rated the film 2 out of 5 and summarised that "AAA is hugely disappointing and a crashing bore. The film tests your patience with a confusing screenplay and disjointed narration." Srivatsan of India Today rated 2 out of 5 stars, stating that "From what we get, Adhik Ravichandran wanted to bring Subramaniyapuram into his of Trisha Illana Nayanthara space. Save for the bits with Madurai Michael, there's no denial that Anbanavan Asaradhavan Adangathavan is not even an ordinarily made film."

Sowmya Rajendran of The News Minute reviewed it as a loud, tacky "gentlemen" oriented film. Baradwaj Rangan wrote for Film Companion, "Adhik Ravichandran appears to make movies with male gaze. He bandages the inabilities and insecurities of his target audience with scene after scene that could be subtitled, "women are like this only." The review of The Indian Express was slightly more on the positive side, rating the film 3 out of 5 stars, and stating that "AAA's highlight would be the dialogues, especially ones about lead actor Simbu's father TR Rajendran and humour will draw audience to the theatres."

== Controversy ==
Several months after the film's release, producer S. Michael Rayappan and Adhik publicly criticised Silambarasan for his alleged unprofessional behaviour during production. They claimed that the first schedule was delayed by two months because no actress wanted to work with Silambarasan due to his reputation. Additionally, they stated that he insisted on moving the shoot from Madurai to Dindigul because he disliked the warm climate in Madurai. Even after relocating, he allegedly refused to shoot in public areas or on Sundays and often did not show up according to the agreed schedule. During the first schedule, Silambarasan reportedly refused to film a song sequence, unfairly requested that Saran be replaced after she had completed her scenes, demanded the shoot be moved from Dubai to London, and failed to meet the script's requirement to reduce his body weight. In the second schedule, he allegedly refused to undergo makeup sessions, arrive on time, demanded a hotel room on the East Coast Road and the dismissal of a production executive who questioned his hotel expenditure. Silambarasan also allegedly cancelled the third schedule, demanded that the film be released in two parts, and sent his team to Thailand at the producers' expense. He later refused to co-operate in completing necessary scenes to make it a two-part film and half-heartedly provided dubbing work. Rayappan revealed that out of an agreed schedule of seventy-six days, Silambarasan only worked for thirty-eight days, leading to the wastage of Bhatia and Saran's dates.

Sources close to Silambarasan countered that Rayappan failed to pay his full remuneration, which caused him to avoid many shoot days. Nonetheless, Silambarasan faced widespread criticism from his peers in the Tamil film industry. In September 2023, the Tamil Film Producers Council was announced to have issued a "red card" to Silambarasan, prohibiting him from working on new projects until further notice. However, in June 2024, Silambarasan denied receiving a red card.
