= Selfie (2022 film) =

2022 Indian Tamil film

- Release date poster
- Directed by: Mathimaran Pugazhendhi
- Written by: Mathimaran Pugazhendhi
- Produced by: D. Sabareesh
- Starring: G. V. Prakash Kumar; Gautham Vasudev Menon; Varsha Bollamma
- Cinematography: Vishnu Rangasamy
- Edited by: S. Elayaraja
- Music by: G. V. Prakash Kumar
- Production company: DG Film Company
- Distributed by: V Creations
- Release date: 1 April 2022
- Running time: 128 minutes
- Country: India
- Language: Tamil

Selfie is a 2022 Indian Tamil-language action thriller film directed by debutant Mathimaran Pugazhendhi and produced by DG Film Company. The film stars G. V. Prakash Kumar, Gautham Vasudev Menon and Varsha Bollamma with a supporting cast including Vidya Pradeep, Vagai Chandrasekhar, Sangili Murugan, Subramaniam Siva, and many others. The film's music is composed by G. V. Prakash Kumar himself, with cinematography handled by Vishnu Rangasamy and editing done by S. Elayaraja. The film was released in theatres on 1 April 2022. The film received generally positive reviews from critics.

== Plot ==
Kanal (G. V. Prakash Kumar) is a hot-headed engineering student at a low-level college. He holds a grudge against his overbearing father who forced him to study engineering just for the sake of prestige when he actually wanted to pursue something business related. When he finds out that his father paid a bribe through a college admission broker to get him the college seat, he becomes determined to investigate it further. He quickly finds out that the underground college admissions racket in Chennai is both a thriving business and an open secret. When a distant relative of a close friend approaches Kanal and his gang for help to get his son admission into a prestigious medical college in the city, they go all out to prove themselves worthy. However, after securing the place, the client pulls out and demands his money back. When Nazir, Kanal's best friend refuses to cooperate, things get out of hand. The client approaches Ravi Varma (Gautham Vasudev Menon), the most powerful college admission broker in the city whose name Kanal's gang used to secure the seat in the first place. Consequently, gangsters and loan sharks start harassing not only Kanal and his friends, but also their families. Nazir eventually makes a decision that will change Kanal and his friends' lives forever.

== Cast ==
- G. V. Prakash Kumar as Kanal
- Gautham Vasudev Menon as Ravi Varma
- Varsha Bollamma as Madhavi
- Vidya Pradeep as Mona, Ravi's wife
- Vagai Chandrasekhar as Kanal's father
- Sangili Murugan
- Syed as Contractor (Chairman Relation)
- Subramaniam Siva
- Aadhirai Soundarajan
- DG Gunanidhi as Nazir
- Sam Paul
- Sreeja Ravi as Nazir's mother
- Thangadurai as Thangam (College lecturer)
- Armaan
- Raj Priyan

== Production ==
=== Development ===
DG Film Company began a new film venture directed by Mathimaran Pugazhendhi, a former associate of Vetrimaaran and featuring G. V. Prakash Kumar in the lead role during May 2020. The film was titled as Selfie.

=== Casting ===
There were reports which were suggesting that Gautham Vasudev Menon would be a part of the film as antagonist.

== Music ==
Selfie

Soundtrack album by G.V. Prakash Kumar
- Released: 2022
- Recorded: 2022
- Genre: Feature film soundtrack
- Language: Tamil
- Label: Sony Music
- Producer: G. V. Prakash Kumar

G.V. Prakash Kumar chronology
Maaran (2022)	Selfie (2022)	Visithiran (2022)

Singles from Selfie
- 1. "Oorkaran" Released: 11 February 2022; 2. "Imaikkariye" Released: 8 March 2022; 3. "Badass Bossman" Released: 18 March 2022

G. V. Prakash Kumar composed the soundtrack and background score. The first single "Oorkaran" was released on 11 February 2022. The second single "Imaikkariye" was released on 8 March 2022. The third single "Badass Bossman" was released on 18 March 2022. The full album jukebox was released on 21 March 2022.

Track listing
No.	Title	Lyrics	Singer(s)	Length
1.	"Oorkaran"	Arivu	Arivu	4:07
2.	"Imaikkariye"	Arivu	G.V. Prakash Kumar, Manasvini Gopal	3:37
3.	"Badass Bossman"	Arivu	Arivu	1:10
4.	"Padippu Thevaillai"	Arivu, Arjun Karthik	Arunraja Kamaraj, Arivu, Robert Sargunam, G. V. Prakash Kumar	2:40
5.	"Yedakoodam"	Arivu	Arivu	3:11
6.	"Yen Monam"	Jayashree Mathimaran	Kapil Kapilan	2:19

== Release ==
Selfie was released in theaters on 1 April 2022.

== Reception ==
Sruthi Raman of The Times of India who gave 3 out of 5 stars after reviewing the film stated that "As much as the film tries to explore an unexplored topic, it sometimes falters to keep up with the pace it starts off with—this is apparent especially in the climax, where the much-awaited loose ends are tied up with rushed sequences". Bhuvanesh Chandar of Cinema Express who gave 3.5 out of 5 stars after reviewing the film stated that "Debutant Mathi Maran has clearly made the most of his resources and a largely new cast to deliver a serious, self-aware film that depends largely on its good writing". Bharathy Singaravel of The News Minute who gave 3 out of 5 stars after reviewing the film stated that "On the whole Selfie is a laudable first attempt by Mathi Maran, who has previously been associated with director Vetrimaaran". Haricharan Pudipeddi of Hindustan Times wrote that "Despite the initial lag, the film picks up after Kanal’s character gets involved in the chaos. The film has a heavy hangover of Vetrimaaran’s Pollathavan, especially in its style and some action scenes. Two action sequences which take place inside a room stand out and serve as the talking points of the movie. The climax does feel rushed but the fact that the film doesn’t try and glorify Kanal’s character by the end deserves some praise."

However, Critic from Maalai Malar noted that "Director Madhi is bound by scenes that cannot be guessed as to what will happen next after a clear screenplay. The fake parents scene is a good twist. Madhimaran has done a good job among the characters."
