= Ayngaran (film) =

2022 Indian film by Ravi Arasu

- Theatrical release poster
- Directed by: Ravi Arasu
- Written by: Ravi Arasu
- Produced by: B. Ganesh
- Starring: G. V. Prakash Kumar; Mahima Nambiar
- Cinematography: Saravanan Abimanyu
- Edited by: Raja Mohammad
- Music by: G. V. Prakash Kumar
- Production company: Common Man Presents
- Release date: 12 May 2022
- Country: India
- Language: Tamil

Ayngaran is a 2022 Indian Tamil-language action drama film written and directed by Ravi Arasu and produced by Common Man Presents. The film stars G. V. Prakash Kumar and Mahima Nambiar with a supporting cast including Kaali Venkat, Aruldoss, Aadukalam Naren and Hareesh Peradi. The film's music is composed by G. V. Prakash Kumar himself, with cinematography handled by Saravanan Abimanyu and editing done by Raja Mohammed. The film was released theatrically on 12 May 2022. The film opened to positive reviews from critics and became a hit at the box office.

== Plot ==
A young inventor struggling to get patent for his inventions, uses his intelligence to save the public from harmful intentions of a Meat racket and a Burglar.

== Cast ==
- G. V. Prakash Kumar as Mathimaaran
- Mahima Nambiar as Anu
- Kaali Venkat as Ezhumalai
- Aruldoss as Intellectual Property Officer
- Aadukalam Naren as Perumalsamy, Mathimaaran's father
- Hareesh Peradi as Inspector Manickam
- Abhishek Vinod as Magudi
- Siddhartha Shankar as Moorthy
- G. Marimuthu as Minister
- George Maryan as Bus Ticket Collector
- Saravana Subbiah as Kid Rescue Department Lead
- Azhagam Perumal as Police Officer
- Jathisha as Ammukutty
- Ravi Venkatraman as Police Officer
- Rail Ravi as PWD Worker
- Robo Chandru as PWD Worker

== Soundtrack ==
The soundtrack and score is composed by G. V. Prakash Kumar and the album featured four songs.

Track listing
No.	Title	Lyrics	Singer(s)	Length
1.	"Takkaru Paarva"	Shiva Shankar	Siddharth Mahadevan, G. V. Prakash Kumar	3:52
2.	"Taan Addi"	Rokesh	Rajaganapathy, Anthony Daasan, V. M. Mahalingam	3:26
3.	"Thithipa"	Vivek	G. V. Prakash Kumar	3:34
4.	"Uyirinum Uyarndha"	Madhan Karky	Hariharan	3:48

== Release ==
The film was scheduled to be released in theatres on 5 May 2022, but was postponed to 12 May 2022 due to lack of adequate screens. The film was released after a three-year delay and received positive reviews from critics.

=== Home media ===
Aha acquired Ayngaran and premiered it on their streaming service on 9 June 2022.

== Reception ==
The film opened to positive reviews from critics. The Times of India wrote that "On the whole, Ayngaran is definitely a film that speaks about a worthy cause, but it could have been made even better". Cinema Express opined that "Convenient turns and poor writing affects this good-intentioned film that speaks about the misfortune small inventors face". A Critic from OTT Play gave 2.5 stars out of 5 and noted that " Ayngaran is a decent attempt that ends up as a movie which entertains in parts. Though there are engaging moments, more detailing of characters would have made it a better movie."

However, G Gowtham Critic from India Herald mentioned that " In the second half, all of the characters are given sufficient closure, making the film more convincing. The protagonist's battles with all of his foes are likewise well-written" Critic from Dinamalar gave 3 stars out of 5
