= Trap City =

- Directed by: Tel K. Ganesan
- Written by: Tel K. Ganesan
- Produced by: Tel K. Ganesan
- Starring: Brandon T. Jackson; Jay "Jeezy" Jenkins; Clifton Powell; Omar Gooding
- Music by: Various artists
- Production company: Kyyba Films
- Distributed by: Anchored Lens; Kyyba Films
- Release date: December 13, 2024
- Country: United States
- Language: English

Trap City is an American independent crime drama film written, directed, and produced by Tel K. Ganesan. The film stars Brandon T. Jackson, Jay "Jeezy" Jenkins, Clifton Powell, and Omar Gooding. It follows an aspiring rapper (DeShawn) who becomes entangled in the drug trade just as his music career begins to gain national attention.

The film premiered theatrically on December 13, 2024, and later achieved wider recognition after becoming the #1 trending film on the STARZ streaming platform in 2025.

== Plot ==
Deshawn, a talented but struggling rapper, works as a runner for a powerful drug dealer while trying to break into the music industry. When one of his songs unexpectedly goes viral, he is arrested on drug charges and offered a plea deal to testify against his former boss. As Deshawn navigates newfound fame, threats from the criminal underworld, and guidance from a local pastor, he must decide whether to cooperate with authorities or remain silent at the cost of his future.

== Cast ==
- Brandon T. Jackson as Deshawn
- Jay "Jeezy" Jenkins as Reverend Lylee
- Clifton Powell as Goose
- Erica Pinkett as Bella
- Omar Gooding as Baby Boy
- Napoleon Duraisamy as Nathan
- Phylicía Lloyd
- Juhahn Jones as Trey
- Dennis L.A. White
- Yogi Babu
- G. V. Prakash Kumar as Doctor
- Tarina Patel as News anchor

== Production ==
Trap City was developed by Tel K. Ganesan through his Detroit-based production company Kyyba Films. Ganesan described the project as an exploration of various forms of "traps," including social, psychological, and economic constraints.

Brandon T. Jackson joined the project as both lead actor and producer, while rapper Jeezy was cast and also served as an executive producer on the film's soundtrack. The production featured a culturally diverse ensemble, including performers from American and Indian cinema.

== Music and soundtrack ==
Music plays a central role in Trap City. The soundtrack was executive-produced by Jay "Jeezy" Jenkins, with music supervision and production led by Ashwin Gane.

Songs featured in the final cut of the film include contributions from Brandon T. Jackson, Lil Reese, TeeCee Rou'Lette, and others. Lil Reese appears on the soundtrack with the tracks "Just Vibin'" and "Clocks".

== Release ==
Trap City premiered in select U.S. theaters on December 13, 2024, with a red-carpet screening in Metro Detroit. Following its theatrical run, the film was released on digital platforms including Amazon Prime Video and Apple TV.

In July 2025, Trap City debuted on STARZ, where it rose to the #1 trending film on the platform.

== Reception ==
Tony Asankomah of GhMovieFreak rated the film 6/10 and wrote, "It might not be entirely a groundbreaking film, but it is a decent drama with moments of intensity and heart".
