= Abinandhan Ramanujam =

Indian cinematographer

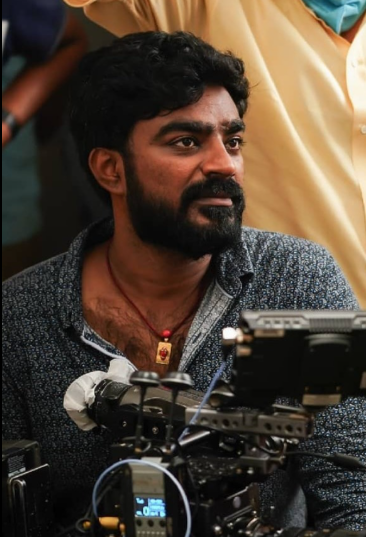
- Born: Chennai, Tamil Nadu, India
- Education: L. V. Prasad Film Institute
- Occupation: Director of photography
- Years active: 2009–present

Abinandhan Ramanujam is an Indian cinematographer who works primarily in Malayalam and Tamil films.

== Early life ==
Abinandhan Ramanujam was born in Chennai, Tamil Nadu. He graduated from L.V. Prasad Film and TV Academy, where he received a gold medal for academic excellence."Alumni of L.V.Prasad Film & TV Academy - Cinematography". prasadacademy.com. Archived from the original on 30 January 2016. He also completed a course in visual communication at Dr G R Damodaran College of Science, Coimbatore. Inspired by his father, a bank officer and amateur photographer, Abinandhan began learning photography using a Yashica camera owned by his father.

== Career ==
Abinandhan's professional break came when he was chosen by director Bejoy Nambiar to work on the MTV series Rush. His friend Akshay Prasad, son of renowned editor A. Sreekar Prasad, recommended him for the project. This led to his collaboration with Lijo Jose Pellissery on the 2013 film Amen."Bejoy Nambiar's take on visuals and sound". The Times of India.

He received attention for his work in Double Barrel, praised for its stylized and experimental cinematography.

== Filmography ==
Year	Film	Language	Notes
2011	Paalai	Tamil	
2012	Friends Book	Telugu	
2013	Amen	Malayalam	
2014	Mosayile Kuthira Meenukal	Malayalam	
2014	Yeh Hai Bakrapur	Hindi	
2015	Double Barrel	Malayalam	
2016	Darvinte Parinamam	Malayalam	
2016	Kavalai Vendam	Tamil	
2017	Kavan	Tamil	
2017	Sakka Podu Podu Raja	Tamil	
2018	Dobaara	Hindi	Short film
2018	Maadathy	Tamil	
2019	Irupathiyonnaam Noottaandu	Malayalam	
2019	Nine	Malayalam	
2019	Kee	Tamil	
2019	Happy Sardar	Malayalam	
2019	Sillu Karupatti	Tamil	
2020	Did You Sleep With Her	English	Short film
2021	Kalathil Santhippom	Tamil	
2021	Backpackers	Malayalam	
2021	Chathur Mukham	Malayalam	
2021	Kuruthi	Malayalam	
2022	Bro Daddy	Malayalam	
2022	Kaduva	Malayalam	
2023	Alone	Malayalam	
2023	Bagheera	Tamil	
2023	Mark Antony	Tamil	
2025	Good Bad Ugly	Tamil	
2025	Pharma	Malayalam	JioHotstar series
2026	Derby	Malayalam	
2026	Magudam	Tamil	Also features segments shot by Richard M. Nathan

As actor

- David (2013)

=== For music videos ===
Filmography
Year	Title	Language	Notes
2012	Club Le Mabbu Le	Tamil	
2020	Lokame (ft. Ekalavyan)	Malayalam	
2021	Kadhal Enge	Tamil	

== As partial cinematographer ==
Year	Title	Language	Director	Notes
2018	Swathandriam Ardharathriyil	Malayalam	Tinu Pappachan	Only the scenes in Mysore
2018	Imaikkaa Nodigal	Tamil	R. Ajay Gnanamuthu	For "Kadhalikathey"
2019	Kaappaan	Tamil	K. V. Anand	Only the scenes in London

== Awards and achievements ==
Awards & Achievements
Year	Award	Category	Film/Other
2009	Gold Medalist	Best Cinematographer	L.V.prasad Film institute
2009	National Film Award for Best Non-Feature Film	Best Non-Feature Film	The Postman
2015	South Indian International Movie Awards	SIIMA Best Cinematographer Malayalam	Mosayile Kuthira Meenukal
2020	7th Aurangabad International film festival Award	Best Cinematographer	Maadathy, an Unfairy Tale

=== Actor in films ===
- David, directed by Bejoy Nambiar

=== Actor in short films ===
- Tinder Kadhal (2018), directed by Pradeep Ranganathan

== Awards and achievements ==
Gold Medalist at L.V. Prasad Film and TV Academy (2009)"Alumni of L.V.Prasad Film & TV Academy". prasadacademy.com. Archived from the original on 30 January 2016.

National Film Award for Best Non-Feature Film for The Postman (2009)"National Film Awards 2009" (PDF). Directorate of Film Festivals.

SIIMA Best Cinematographer – Malayalam for Mosayile Kuthira Meenukal (2015)"SIIMA 2015 Malayalam Winners". SIIMA.

Best Cinematographer – 7th Aurangabad International Film Festival for Maadathy (2020)"Maadathy: An Unfairy Tale – A poetic and powerful narrative". The Hindu. 3 July 2020.
