= Adhik Ravichandran =

Indian film director, screenwriter, actor, playback singer

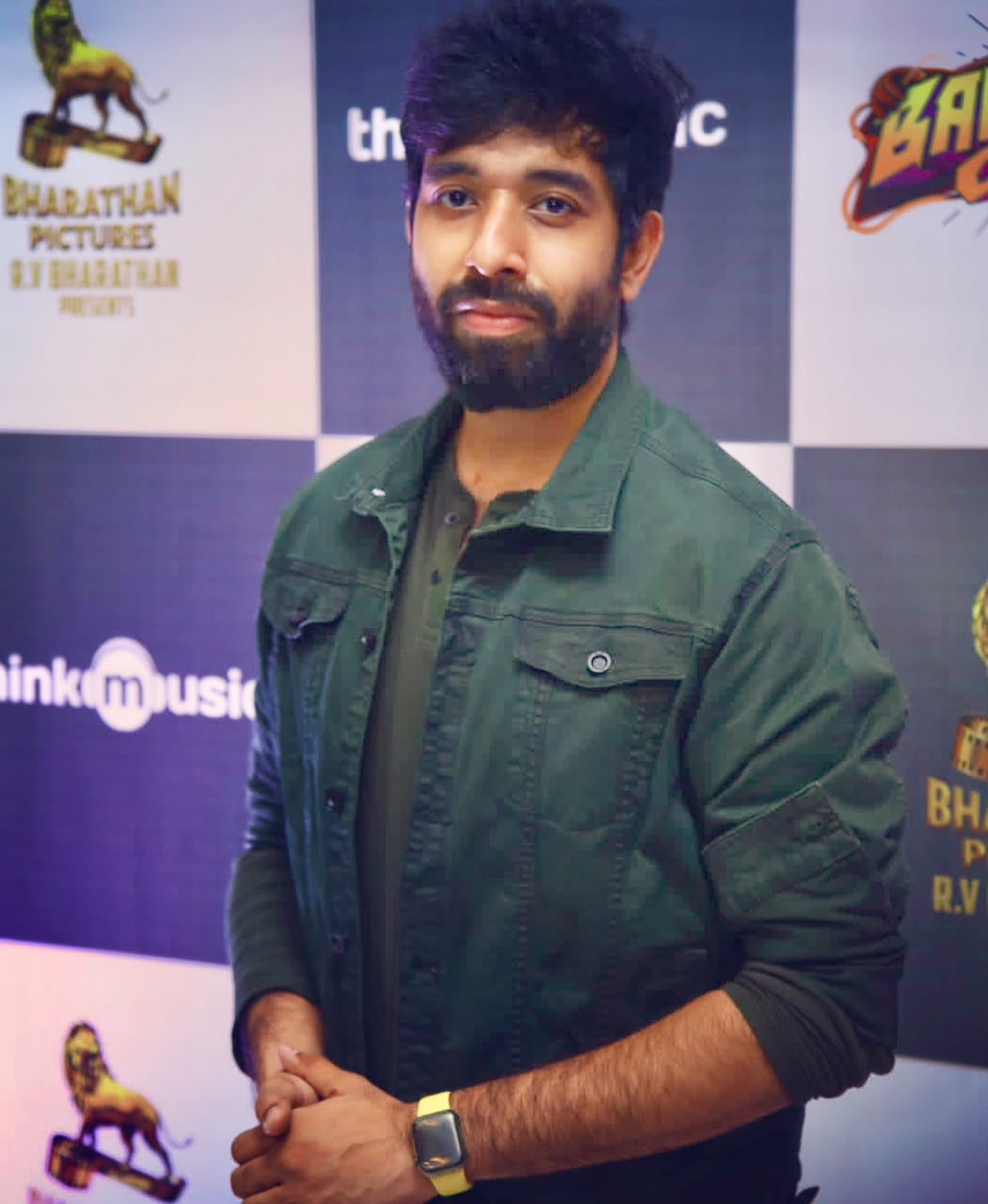
- Born: 17 January 1985 (age 41); Ongole, Andhra Pradesh
- Occupations: Film director; screenwriter; actor; playback singer
- Years active: 2015–present
- Spouse: Aishwarya Prabhu (m. 2023)
- Children: 1

Adhik Ravichandran (/ɑːðɪk/) is an Indian film director, screenwriter, actor and playback singer who works in Tamil cinema. He made his directorial debut with the successful comedy Trisha Illana Nayanthara (2015). Following a setback with two consecutive failures, his career revitalised with Mark Antony (2023), which grossed ₹100 crore (US$10 million) at the box office.

== Early life ==
Adhik was born on 17 January 1985. He is the son of Ravichandran "Ravi" Kandaswamy, who has worked as an assistant director for nearly two decades but has not made his directorial debut. Because of Ravi's struggles in the film industry, Adhik's mother forbade Adhik from pursuing that as his career, though he still remained passionate. Adhik aspired to study visual communication in college but instead took up engineering to appease his mother, though he began writing scripts from the first semester to the final.

== Career ==
After graduating college, Adhik trained as an assistant director under Major Ravi before making his directorial debut with Trisha Illana Nayanthara (2015). The film was a major success. However, his next film Anbanavan Asaradhavan Adangadhavan (2017) was a box-office bomb, and he accused the lead actor, Silambarasan, of interfering creatively and causing problems during production. He later wrote the dialogues for the Tamil-dubbed version of the Hindi film Dabangg 3 (2019).

Adhik's third film as director, Bagheera (2023), did not succeed commercially and was criticised for relying on misogynistic tropes. However, Mark Antony, which released later the same year, revitalised his career as it grossed over ₹100 crore (equivalent to ₹109 crore or US$11 million in 2026) at the box-office, worldwide. After Mark Antony, Adhik directed Good Bad Ugly (2025), which grossed over ₹240 crore (equivalent to ₹248 crore or US$26 million in 2026). He is also confirmed to direct Dare Devil.

== Personal life ==
In December 2023, Adhik married Aishwarya, daughter of actor Prabhu. They have a son born in May 2026.

== Filmography ==
=== As a film director ===
Year	Title	Notes
2015	Trisha Illana Nayanthara	Cameo appearance
2017	Anbanavan Asaradhavan Adangadhavan	Cameo appearance
2023	Bagheera	
2023	Mark Antony	
2025	Good Bad Ugly	
TBA	Dare Devil	

=== As a writer ===
Year	Title	Writer	Notes
2019	Dabangg 3	Dialogues	Tamil dubbed version

=== As an actor ===
Year	Title	Role	Notes	Ref.
2019	K-13	Vijay		
2019	Nerkonda Paarvai	Vishwa		
2022	Cobra	Bhavana's relative		

=== As a playback singer ===
Year	Song	Film	Composer	Lyricist	Ref.
2015	"Bittu Padam Di"	Trisha Illana Nayanthara	G. V. Prakash Kumar	Rokesh	
2023	"I Love You Di"	Mark Antony	G. V. Prakash Kumar	Rokesh, Himself	
2025	"OG Sambavam"	Good Bad Ugly	G. V. Prakash Kumar	Vishnu Edavan	
