= Darkkey Nagaraja =

Malaysian musician

- Occupation: Musician
- Years active: 1996–present
- Formerly of: Darkkey & The Keys

Darkkey Nagaraja is a Malaysian musician of Indian descent known for his work in Tamil music. He used to be a part of the band Darkkey & The Keys. Nagaraja is known as the 'King of Samba Rock'.

== Discography ==
=== Albums ===
==== The Keys ====
- Akkamage (1996)
- Maragita (1997)
- Maravana (1998)
- Karatana (1999)
- Jammarasan (2000)
- Kaligaa (2001)
- J-Mann (2002)
- Udumbeh (2003)
- Karma (2004)

==== Independent ====
- Arakana (2000)
- Darajana (2001)
- Devilana (2002)
- Amarana (2003)
- Maradona (2004)
- Murugana (2005)
- Tsunamina (2006)
- Andavana (2007)
- Diamlah feat The Keys (2008)
- Wirawana (2010)
- Jadama feat The Keys (2013)
- Onna Manna (2014)

== Personal life ==
Nagaraja has a daughter.

In May 2023, Darkkey claimed that he was a Dato, which did not go down well with netizens as he was not officially given the title.

== Other work ==
In 2016, he made a cameo appearance in the Indian film Kabali, which was shot in Malaysia. In 2025, he wrote and sang the song "AK The Tiger" for Good Bad Ugly (2024), which was based on his own song "Arakana" from Arakana (2000). The song was successful and became an anthem for Ajith Kumar's fans.
