= Bagheera (2023 film) =

2023 film directed by Adhik Ravichandran

- Theatrical release poster
- Directed by: Adhik Ravichandran
- Written by: Adhik Ravichandran
- Produced by: R. V. Bharathan
- Starring: Prabhu Deva; Srikanth; Amyra Dastur; Gayathrie
- Cinematography: Selvakumar S. K.; Abinandhan Ramanujam
- Edited by: Ruben
- Music by: Ganesan S.
- Production company: Bharathan Pictures
- Release date: 3 March 2023
- Running time: 160 minutes
- Country: India
- Language: Tamil

Bagheera is a 2023 Indian Tamil-language psychological romantic thriller film written and directed by Adhik Ravichandran. The film stars Prabhu Deva, Srikanth, Amyra Dastur, and Gayathrie. It revolves around a man who becomes a serial killer targeting women due to their perceived immorality.

Bagheera was released theatrically on 3 March 2023, following delays related to the COVID-19 pandemic. It received mixed reviews from critics with criticism towards the misogynistic plot and characters and became a box-office failure, although Prabhu Deva's performance was praised by critics.

== Plot ==
In 2023, Bagheera is a psychopath who murders multiple girls by disguising himself in different disguises. Inspector Sai Kumar is assigned to investigate one of Bagheera's victims, where the cops find the dead bodies turned into statues. Ramya is a psychology student who conducts a case study on Bagheera. One of the twin brothers tries to commit suicide, but the other one saves him and suggests the app named Bagheera, which reveals that if a girl cheats on their man, he can file a complaint through the app, and Bagheera will kill the girl. Bagheera receives a complaint about Ramya cheating on his boyfriend Ranjith, where he begins to make her love him and disguises himself with another name. Bagheera brings them to a house located in Sri Lanka, where he killed those girls and made them statues. Bagheera also brings Ramya to the same house. A blind man finds a diary written in Braille, where he reads it and hands the diary over to the cops after discovering that the owner of the diary is Bagheera.

In 1999, Murali, Prabhu and Pakru were friends in Coimbatore, who always watched The Jungle Book on TV. Prabhu considered himself as Bagheera and Murali as Mowgli. After Prabhu's mother's death, Murali's parents adopt Prabhu as their son. Murali's father, Ganesan, has a statue factory. Prabhu had a girlfriend, whom he affectionately referred to as Rabbit. While playing with Rabbit, Prabhu sees Swapna with a boy; she pepper sprays Prabhu, blinding him. Due to her father's transfer, Rabbit has to leave the city. Murali is now running the statue factory, where he marries Reshma. Bagheera gets his eyesight after Murali's mother donates her eyes to him. Concurrently, Prabhu learns that Murali committed suicide because Reshma was cheating him. Prabhu goes to kill her, but she escapes with her boyfriend, Rohit. Prabhu goes to a mental asylum, where Ganesan brings him out. With no knowledge about Reshma, Prabhu considers the girls cheating on their boyfriends as Reshma and begins his crusade to finish them.

In the present, Bagheera/Prabhu tries to kill Ramya and ties her to the statue-making machine. Ramya soon starts to divert him by talking to Murali's soul, explaining that she does not know Ranjith and does not cheat on anyone. Prabhu calls Ranjith, who says he stalked her, but she did not accept his love, which is why he complained in the app. Prabhu soon learns that Ramya is none other than Rabbit. He gets arrested and receives minimum punishment due to mental illness.

Twenty-five years later, in 2048, Prabhu and Ramya are the parents of a son named Murali. Prabhu learns that Murali is in love with a girl and tells him to call her parents to solve the issue between the lovers. The girl brings her mother, who is none other than Reshma. Prabhu tells his son to leave them for a chat. Prabhu secretly gets a knife and kills Reshma by slashing her throat, thus avenging his friend Murali's death.

== Cast ==
- Prabhu Deva as Prabhu alias Bagheera
  - Ashwanth Ashokkumar as young Prabhu
- Srikanth as Murali alias Mowgli
- Amyra Dastur as Ramya (Voice-over by Raveena Ravi)
  - Veronika Arora as young Ramya
- Gayathrie as Pallavi
- Remya Nambeesan as Vedhavalli
- Janani as Rubha Reddy
- Sanchita Shetty as Alia (Voice-over by Smruthi K)
- Sakshi Agarwal as Reshma
- Sai Kumar as Inspector Sai Kumar
- Nassar as Ganesan, Murali's father
- Pragathi as Rukmani, Murali's mother
- Manikandan as Police Officer
- Yuvarani as Swapna
- Agilan Pushparaj as Varun, Alia's boy bestie
- Shanmugarajan
- G. M. Kumar as Medico-Legal Advisor
- Kalairani as mother of a love failure victim
- Mohan Vaidya as Vedhavalli's father
- Shivashankar as Officer
- Yashika Aannand as Prabhu's victim (cameo)
- TSR Srinivasan as Pallavi's father
- GP Muthu as himself
- Baba Bhaskar
- Raj Kapoor
- Gopinath Ravi as Rohith, who is a boy friend of Reshma
- Guinness Pakru as Pakru, one of the guys who disguises himself as a teddy bear, as well as Murali and Bagheera's friend
- Saran Shakthi as Murali (Prabhu and Ramya's son)
- Vetrivel Raja as Police officer
- Sonia Agarwal as Priyam (deleted scenes)

== Production ==
The title of the film and the names of a few characters were inspired by the TV series The Jungle Book. In this film, Prabhu is referred to as Bagheera, and his friend Murali is referred to as Mowgli; also, Pakru is referred to as Baloo the bear. Production began before the COVID-19 pandemic. The film's production was halted due to the pandemic, but it resumed after the government granted permission. Filming ended by December 2021.

== Music ==
Bagheera

Soundtrack album by Ganesan S
- Released: 28 February 2023
- Recorded: 2020–2021
- Genre: Feature film soundtrack
- Length: 14:39
- Language: Tamil
- Label: Think Music
- Producer: Ganesan S

Singles from Bagheera
- 1. "Psycho Raja" Released: 6 May 2021

The music was composed by Ganesan S, in his film debut. A remix version of "Pattukottai Ammalu" song from Ranga (1982) is used in the climax.

Track listing
No.	Title	Lyrics	Singer(s)	Length
1.	"Psycho Raja"	Pa. Vijay	G. V. Prakash Kumar, Mangli, Suchithra Balasubramanian, Bharath Narayan	3:41
2.	"Kuch Kuch Hota Hai"	Adhik Ravichandran, Rokesh	Thaman S, Ganesan S	3:40
3.	"Bagheera In Love"	Ganesan S	Daisey Yensone	3:57
4.	"Uyir Uyiraai"	Pa. Vijay	Ganesan S, Vivek	3:21
Total length:				14:39

== Release ==
=== Theatrical ===
The film was released theatrically on 3 March 2023.

=== Home media ===
The film began streaming on Sun NXT from 31 March 2023.

== Reception ==
Bagheera received mixed reviews from critics. Prashanth Vallavan of Cinema Express gave 2/5 stars and wrote "While there are moments in Bagheera that massively benefit from such lighthearted treatment, there are sections of the film that are too deliberately filled with logical loopholes and careless writing." Gopinath Rajendran of The Hindu wrote "What comes as probably the only silver lining is Prabhu Deva for whom Bagheera offers ample scope to perform". Logesh Balachandran of The Times of India gave 1.5/5 stars and wrote "Bagheera might have worked if it had been released decades ago, but even then, it's absurd to propagate these kinds of ideas". A critic from Dinamalar gave 1.5/5 stars.
