= Mark Antony (2023 film) =

- Theatrical release poster
- Directed by: Adhik Ravichandran
- Screenplay by: Adhik Ravichandran; S. J. Arjun; R. Savari Muthu
- Story by: Adhik Ravichandran
- Produced by: S. Vinod Kumar
- Starring: Vishal; S. J. Suryah
- Narrated by: Karthi
- Cinematography: Abinandhan Ramanujam
- Edited by: Vijay Velukutty
- Music by: G. V. Prakash Kumar
- Production company: Mini Studio
- Distributed by: Ayngaran International
- Release date: 15 September 2023
- Running time: 150 minutes
- Country: India
- Language: Tamil
- Box office: est. ₹100 crore

Mark Antony is a 2023 Indian Tamil-language science fiction action comedy film directed by Adhik Ravichandran. The film stars Vishal and S. J. Suryah in dual roles with Ritu Varma, Sunil, Selvaraghavan, Abhinaya, Y. G. Mahendran, Nizhalgal Ravi, Redin Kingsley and Manikandan in supporting roles. In the film, Mark, the son of a gangster Antony, finds a telephone which can contact the past, but Madhan, the son of rival gangster Jackie, wants it for himself.

The film, produced by S. Vinod Kumar under Mini Studio, was officially announced in December 2021 under the tentative title Vishal 33, as it is Vishal's 33rd film as the lead actor, and the official title was revealed in January 2022. Principal photography began in May 2022 and wrapped by May 2023. The music was composed by G. V. Prakash Kumar, while the cinematography and editing were handled by Abinandhan Ramanujam and Vijay Velukutty.

Mark Antony was released in theatres on 15 September 2023, during Vinayagar Chathurthi. The film grossed over ₹100 crore, becoming the highest-grossing film in Vishal's career.

== Plot ==
In 1975, Chiranjeevi, a scientist, invents a telephone that allows its users to make calls to people in the past by selecting a date; only one call can be made for each selected date. Meanwhile, gangsters Antony and Jackie Pandian, best friends in Chennai, have a common enemy named Ekambaram. Ekambaram decides to take revenge against Antony for killing his brother. He kills Antony in a club; Chiranjeevi dies in the crossfire. Jackie soon becomes the solo kingpin, adopts Antony's son Mark, and raises him like his own son.

In 1995, Mark, now a mechanic in Royapuram, hates Antony for being responsible for his mother Vedhavalli's death. He is in love with his neighbour Ramya and decides to marry soon. He decides to sell his garage and move away from Royapuram, but Jackie disallows him, fearing for his safety. At the registrar's office, Ekambaram tries to shoot Jackie, but the latter kills him later that night. Ramya's mother learns that Mark is Antony's son and asks him to leave Ramya alone.

One day, a drunken Mark finds Chiranjeevi's telephone and realises its capabilities. Using the phone, he first saves his mother and younger self from Ekambaram and his men. He then warns Antony's advocate, Selvam, about his upcoming demise and asks him to meet him in 1995 at his garage. Selvam evades death, and Mark learns from him that Antony was not a bad person and Mark was made to believe it by Jackie, the actual mastermind behind Antony and Vedhavalli's deaths, as Antony refused Jackie's involvement in illegal activities like drug smuggling, arms trafficking and prostitution. Mark manages to change history by making calls to the past, where Antony kills Jackie.

Mark soon wakes up in the present to find that he is in Jackie's place as a gangster with Ekambaram as his guardian, while Jackie's son Madhan is in Mark's place as a mechanic. Madhan soon learns about the telephone and Mark's involvement in changing history. He uses it to inform Jackie. Jackie attempts to kill Antony, but Antony survives all the attempts and learns about Jackie's true intentions. Jackie and his men surround Antony and Ekambaram at the club, and Antony is seemingly killed. Mark awakens in the present to find himself back as a mechanic along with Ekambaram, while Jackie is still alive, and Madhan is a gangster.

Madhan kidnaps Ramya and orders Mark to arrive at the club godown. Mark arrives, and Madhan and Jackie's henchmen thrash him. However, Antony arrives at the godown; it is revealed that Ekambaram saved Antony in the club shootout and had sent him to Colombia due to many encounter killings of gangsters by police. Antony gained the partnership of the Colombian underworld as Jackie usually sent commission to the gangsters under Antony's name. Antony kills the henchmen using Anaconda, a large artillery, then kills Jackie and Madhan.

Antony reunites with Mark and uses the telephone to call Vedhavalli, but she is held at gunpoint by Chiranjeevi who takes over the call, demanding his telephone back from Antony. Chiranjeevi discovers he himself is being held at gunpoint by Jackie, demanding to talk to Antony. Antony laughs at Jackie and replies, "Welcome back".

== Cast ==
- Vishal in a dual role as
  - Mark
  - Antony
- S. J. Suryah in a dual role as
  - Jackie Pandian
  - Madhan Pandian
- Ritu Varma as Ramya
- Sunil as Ekambaram
- Selvaraghavan as Chiranjeevi
- Abhinaya as Vedhavalli
- Y. G. Mahendran as Gowri
- Nizhalgal Ravi as Adv. K. Selvam
- Redin Kingsley as Maserati
- Gold D. S. G. as Thangaraj alias "Gold" Raj
- Manikandan as Kumar
- Sendrayan as Antony's sidekick
- TSR Srinivasan as Car owner
- Ravi Kandasamy as Chiranjeevi's assistant
- Meera Krishnan as Ramya's mother
- Anitha Sampath as Janaki, Chiranjeevi's wife
- Vishnu Priya Gandhi as Silk Smitha (cameo appearance)
- Karthi as the narrator

== Production ==
In September 2021, it was reported that Vishal would team with Adhik Ravichandran for a film and would be produced by S. Vinod Kumar under Mini Studio. In December, it was officially confirmed by the team that they are teaming up for the tentatively titled project Vishal 33. The same month, S. J. Suryah was reported to play the antagonist and was confirmed on New Year's Day, along with the title Mark Antony, named after Raghuvaran's character from Baashha (1995). In May 2022, the team announced Ritu Varma as the female lead, while Sunil and Nizhalgal Ravi would appear in prominent roles. Vishnu Priya Gandhi, a social media influencer, was chosen by the makers to portray Silk Smitha due to her resemblance. Make-up and visual effects were used to further enhance her resemblance to Smitha.

Principal photography began on 5 May 2022 with a muhurat puja in Chennai. The first schedule took place in Chennai, with Varma joining them in July. The shooting was placed on hold because Vishal got injured during shooting in August and resumed in October with the second schedule. The final schedule started in January 2023 and was nearing shooting completion. Suryah completed shooting his portions in April. In May, Vishal and Sunil finished their portions with a cake-cutting. Vishal started dubbing for his portions in May. In July, Vishal stated that the dubbing was in the final stages.

== Soundtrack ==
Mark Antony

Soundtrack album by G. V. Prakash Kumar
- Released: 13 September 2023
- Genre: Film soundtrack
- Length: 11:52
- Language: Tamil
- Label: Think Music India
- Producer: G. V. Prakash Kumar

G. V. Prakash Kumar chronology
Karumegangal Kalaigindrana (2023)	Mark Antony (2023)	Tiger Nageswara Rao (2023)

Singles from Mark Antony
- 1. "Adhirudha" Released: 15 July 2023; 2. "I Love You Di" Released: 23 August 2023

The music was composed by G. V. Prakash Kumar in his second collaboration with Vishal after Naan Sigappu Manithan (2014) and second with Adhik after Trisha Illana Nayanthara (2015). The first single "Adhirudha" released on 15 July 2023 and the second single "I Love You Di" on 23 August 2023. The complete album was released in mid-September.

Track listing
No.	Title	Lyrics	Singer(s)	Length
1.	"Adhirudha"	Asal Kolaar	T. Rajendar, Asal Kolaar	4:00
2.	"I Love You Di"	Rokesh, Adhik Ravichandran	Adhik Ravichandran	3:07
3.	"Amma Ennum Mandhiramey"	Madhurakavi	Saindhavi	2:11
4.	"Karuppana Saamy"	Madhurakavi	Ananthu	2:34
Total length:				11:52

== Release ==
=== Theatrical ===
Mark Antony was released on 15 September 2023, during Vinayagar Chathurthi. According to Vishal, he had to pay a bribe of ₹6.5 lakh (US$6,700) to a Mumbai censor board official to ensure its Hindi dubbed version's release.

=== Home media ===
The post-theatrical streaming rights of the film were acquired by Amazon Prime Video, where it began streaming from 13 October 2023. The film had its television premiere on Zee Tamil on 24 March 2024.

== Critical reception ==
OTTPlay reported that Mark Antony received positive reviews from critics, while The Times of India noted they were mixed.

Logesh Balachandran of The Times of India gave 3.5/5 stars and wrote, "Mark Antony is not a great film, but it's quite a refreshing entertainer that delivers what it promises." Krishna Selvaseelan of Tamil Guardian gave 3/5 stars and wrote, "Overall, although oftentimes headache inducing and downright nonsensical, Ravichandran should be lauded for a unique and entertaining film". Janani K of India Today gave 2.5/5 stars and wrote "Mark Antony is a valiant effort and, with certain shortcomings, it still manages to engage the audience and leave them in splits." Kirubhakar Purushothaman of The Indian Express gave 2.5/5 stars and wrote "SJ Suryah single handedly saves Mark Antony from becoming a redundant mess."

Gautaman Bhaskaran of News18 gave 2/5 stars and wrote, "Vishal and SJ Suryah are wasted in a whacky and crazy script." Sangeetha P of OTTPlay gave 2.5/5 stars and wrote, "Mark Antony, packed with many exciting and mass moments, and despite its many flaws, makes for an entertaining watch. While Vishal is back with a bang, SJ Suryah turns out to be the star of this commercial entertainer." Bharathy Singaravel of The News Minute gave 2/5 stars and wrote, "While actor Vishal plays a predictable double role as Mark and Antony, director Adhik Ravichandran has thrown in a generous helping of sexualising trans women, and homophobia." Priyanka Sundar of Firstpost gave 2/5 stars and wrote, "Mark Antony squandered its potential, leaving us with a lingering sense of dissatisfaction."
