= G. V. Prakash Kumar =

Indian composer

- Born: G. V. Prakash Kumar; 13 June 1987 (age 39); Chennai, Tamil Nadu, India
- Education: Trinity Laban (Piano)
- Occupations: Actor; Composer; Playback singer; Film producer; Music director
- Spouse: Saindhavi (m. 2013; div. 2025)
- Children: 1
- Parent: A. R. Reihana (mother)
- Relatives: A. R. Rahman (uncle); Bhavani Sre (Sister)
- Family: R. K. Shekhar family
- Musical career
- Genres: Film score; world music; pop; Jazz; Rock; Folk; Classical
- Instruments: Vocals; keyboards; piano; percussions; drums; guitar; Folk instruments
- Years active: 2005–present
- Labels: Sony Music India; T-Series; YRF Music; Sony DADC; Aditya Music; Lahari Music; Universal Music; Eros Music

G. V. Prakash Kumar (born 13 June 1987), is an Indian musician, actor, and film producer who works predominantly in Tamil cinema. He is a recipient of three National Film Awards, four Filmfare Awards, and three SIIMA Awards.

Originally a child singer in the 1990s, Prakash made his debut as a composer with S Pictures' Veyil (2006), and rose to prominence in the early 2010s. He made his acting debut in 2015 with Darling.

== Early life ==
Prakash Kumar is the son of G. Venkatesh and playback singer A. R. Reihana, who is the elder sister of music director A. R. Rahman. His sister Bhavani Sre is also in the film industry.

== Personal life ==
Prakash married his schoolmate, singer Saindhavi, in 2013. The couple have a daughter born in 2020. On 13 May 2024, Prakash and Saindhavi announced their separation after 11 years of marriage. They officially divorced on 30 September 2025.

== Career ==
=== Music direction ===
He first appeared as a vocalist on the soundtrack of director S. Shankar's Tamil film Gentleman (1993), composed by his maternal uncle, A. R. Rahman. He has also contributed to some of Rahman's other projects. He had also worked with Harris Jayaraj and sang two songs in Anniyan (2005) and Unnale Unnale (2007).

G.V. Prakash's introduction as a film composer was in the critically acclaimed Tamil film Veyil (2006) directed by Vasanthabalan and produced by director S. Shankar. His music in the film Madrasapattinam (2010), directed by A. L. Vijay was appreciated, especially his song "Pookal Pookum Tharunam".

He went on to win critical acclaim for his music in Selvaraghavan's fantasy action adventure film Aayirathil Oruvan (2009), National award-winning Aadukalam (2010) and drama film Mayakkam Enna (2011), which became his third collaboration that featured Dhanush in the lead role. The album's five songs were written by Selvaraghavan and Dhanush, with the pair also coming together to sing the song "Kadhal En Kadhal". The album also included the song "Pirai Thedum", which Prakash sang himself along with his fiancée, Saindhavi whilst another song "Voda Voda Voda", written and sung by Dhanush, was composed in just 5 minutes and recorded within an hour. Rediff.com reviewed the soundtrack claiming that Prakash had "tried very hard to walk away from his comfort zone and provide the kind of edgy numbers Selvaraghavan demands, and has risen to the challenge". Critics from entertainment portal Behindwoods.com cited that Prakash "reiterates his talent once again" and gave a verdict that the album is "intoxicating enough".

In late September 2011, a single track "Oru Murai", written by Thamarai and composed and sung by Prakash in R. S. Infotainment's Muppozhudhum Un Karpanaigal (2012) was released. His subsequent releases include the political satire Saguni (2012) and the background score of the Hindi crime film Gangs of Wasseypur and also composed Sunrisers Hyderabad's first anthem. Songs of the movie Darling (2015) were hits. Especially "Vandha Mala", "Anbe Anbe" and "Sattunu Idi Mazhai".This is also the debut film for Prakash as an actor. "Karuppu Nerathazhagi" was a huge hit from Komban (2015). G.V. Prakash signed his 50th film with director Atlee that is Vijay's 59th, which is named Theri (2016).

He also has compositions such as Vetrimaaran-Dhanush's Asuran (2019) and Sudha Kongara-Suriya's Soorarai Pottru (2020). G. V. Prakash Kumar wins the Best Music Director of the Year in the Osaka Tamil International Film Festival for Asuran. And later, he won National Film Award for Best Music Direction (Background Music) and Filmfare Award for Best Music Director – Tamil for Soorarai Pottru. G.V. Prakash has won the Best Music Direction at the 71st National Film Awards for his work in the Tamil film Vaathi (2023). He won also the Best Music Director at the SIIMA Award as well as the Filmfare Award for Amaran (2024).

=== Acting ===
In 2012, director A.R. Murugadoss approached Kumar regarding a potential acting venture. Prakash agreed to star in the project, however, the film later failed to take off. He subsequently signed on to appear in three films in quick succession, with the three entering production simultaneously. In order to further his acting ability, he took lessons from actor Aadukalam Naren and has noted that his stage performances as a singer were also helpful in demonstrating his potential as an actor.

In 2013, Prakash Kumar launched his own production house under the name "GV Prakash Kumar Productions". His first film Madha Yaanai Koottam, was directed by Vikram Sugumaran, a former assistant of Balu Mahendra.

Prakash was going to make his acting debut in a film titled Pencil, opposite Sri Divya, where he will be playing a school student. However, as Pencil's release was delayed, his first release became the horror film Darling. A remake of the 2013 Telugu film Prema Katha Chitram. Thereafter, Trisha Illana Nayanthara (2015). The film deals with the present day definition of love and the perspective of today's youngsters of both genders about love, relationship, virginity etc. In 2016, he appeared in Pencil and two comedies films Enakku Innoru Per Irukku and Kadavul Irukaan Kumaru. The next is Bruce Lee (2017). He acted in the climax sequence as cameo appearance with Silambarasan's Anbanavan Asaradhavan Adangadhavan (2017). In 2018, he starred in Bala's action crime Naachiyaar. He acted in second role next to Jyothika. Then the comedy-drama, Semma released on May. In 2019, he had five releases this year with Sarvam Thaala Mayam, Kuppathu Raja, Watchman, Sivappu Manjal Pachai and 100% Kadhal.

In 2021, his film Vanakkam Da Mappilei was a direct to OTT release. It was marks the second collaboration of G. V. Prakash and Rajesh after 2016's Kadavul Irukaan Kumaru. Following Bachelor and Jail were released in December. Later, films such as Selfie (2022), Ayngaran (2023) and Adiyae (2023) was released to positive reviews. In 2024, his subsequent films Rebel, Kalvan and Kalvan all failed. The film Trap City, which also marks G. V. Prakash Kumar’s Hollywood debut. He acted in his 25th film, in the fantasy Kingston (2025). He was seen next in the crime thriller, Blackmail (2025).

== Discography ==
=== As composer ===
Year	Film	Language	Notes
2006	Veyil	Tamil	
2007		Tamil	
2007	Kireedam	Tamil	
2007	Oram Po	Tamil	
2007	Polladhavan	Tamil	3 songs
2007	Evano Oruvan ^{#} ^{[Title Song]}	Tamil	
2007	Velli Thirai	Tamil	
2008	Kaalai	Tamil	
2008	Ullasamga Utsahamga	Telugu	
2008	Kuselan	Tamil	
2008	Kathanayakudu	Telugu	
2008	Ananda Thandavam	Tamil	
2008	Naan Aval Adhu (2 songs)	Tamil	Soundtrack Released; Film Unreleased
2008	Seval	Tamil	
2009	Angaadi Theru ^{#} ^{[4 songs]}	Tamil	
2009	Aayirathil Oruvan	Tamil	
2009	Irumbukkottai Murattu Singam ^{#}	Tamil	
2009	Ullasa Utsaha	Kannada	
2010	Madrasapattinam	Tamil	
2010	Darling	Telugu	
2010	Va	Tamil	
2010	Punda	Kannada	
2011	Aadukalam	Tamil	
2011	Narthagi	Tamil	
2011	Deiva Thirumagal	Tamil	
2011	Mayakkam Enna	Tamil	
2011	Appanum Aathalum	Tamil	Television serial
2012	Muppozhudhum Un Karpanaigal	Tamil	
2012	Endukante... Premanta!	Telugu	
2012	Saguni	Tamil	Reused 1 song from Ullasa Utsaha
2012	Gangs of Wasseypur – Part 1 ^{#2}	Hindi	
2012	Joker ^{#}	Hindi	
2012	Gangs of Wasseypur – Part 2 ^{#2}	Hindi	
2012	Thaandavam	Tamil	
2012	Paradesi	Tamil	
2013	Naan Rajavaga Pogiren	Tamil	
2013	Ongole Githa ^{# [4 Songs]}	Telugu	
2013	Annakodi	Tamil	
2013	Udhayam NH4	Tamil	
2013	Thalaivaa	Tamil	
2013	Raja Rani	Tamil	
2013	JK Enum Nanbanin Vaazhkai / Rajadhi Raja ^{#}	Tamil / Telugu	
2013	Nimirndhu Nil	Tamil	
2013	Janda Pai Kapiraju	Telugu	
2014	Naan Sigappu Manithan	Tamil	
2014	Saivam	Tamil	
2014	Irumbu Kuthirai	Tamil	
2014	Darling	Tamil	
2014	Ugly ^{#}	Hindi	
2015	Pencil	Tamil	
2015	Rajathanthiram ^{#}	Tamil	
2015	Komban	Tamil	
2015	Idhu Enna Maayam	Tamil	
2015	Kaaval ^{#}	Tamil	5 songs
2015	Kaaka Muttai	Tamil	
2015	Trisha Illana Nayanthara	Tamil	
2015	Eetti	Tamil	
2016	Visaranai	Tamil	
2016	Theri	Tamil	
2016	Enakku Innoru Per Irukku	Tamil	
2016	Meendum Oru Kadhal Kadhai	Tamil	
2016	Half Ticket	Tamil	Remake of Kaaka Muttai
2016	Kadavul Irukaan Kumaru	Tamil	
2017	Mupparimanam	Tamil	
2017	Bruce Lee	Tamil	
2017	Lens ^{#}	Tamil	
2018	Semma	Tamil	
2019	Kuppathu Raja	Tamil	
2019	Watchman	Tamil	
2019	100% Kadhal	Tamil	
2019	Asuran	Tamil	
	Soorarai Pottru	Tamil	
2020	Putham Pudhu Kaalai	Tamil	
2021	Vanakkam Da Mappilei	Tamil	
2021	Thalaivi	Tamil	
2021	Bachelor ^{#}	Tamil	
2022	Maaran	Tamil	
2022	Selfie	Tamil	
2022	Visithiran	Tamil	
2022	Ayngaran	Tamil	
2022	Yaanai	Tamil	
2022	Sardar	Tamil	
2023	Vaathi / Sir	Tamil / Telugu	
2023	Rudhran ^{#}	Tamil	
2023	Modern Love Chennai	Tamil	Web series Episode 3
2023	Boo ^{#}	Tamil / Telugu	
2023	Kathar Basha Endra Muthuramalingam	Tamil	
2023	Aneethi	Tamil	
2023	Karumegangal Kalaigindrana	Tamil	
2023	Mark Antony	Tamil	
2023	Tiger Nageswara Rao	Telugu	
2023	Japan	Tamil	
2023	Aadikeshava	Telugu	
2024	Captain Miller	Tamil	
2024	Mission: Chapter 1	Tamil	
2024	Siren ^{#}	Tamil	
2024	Rebel	Tamil	
2024	Kalvan	Tamil	
2024	Dear	Tamil	
2024	Sarfira	Hindi	
2024	Thangalaan	Tamil	
2024	Amaran	Tamil	
2024	Lucky Baskhar	Telugu	
2024	Matka	Telugu	
2025	Vanangaan	Tamil	
2025	Emergency ^{#}	Hindi	
2025	Nilavuku En Mel Ennadi Kobam	Tamil	
2025	Kingston	Tamil	
2025	Veera Dheera Sooran: Part 2	Tamil	
2025	Robinhood	Telugu	
2025	Good Bad Ugly	Tamil	
2025	Padaiyaanda Maaveeraa	Tamil	
2025	Idli Kadai	Tamil	
2025	Mask	Tamil	
2026	Parasakthi	Tamil	
2026	Youth	Tamil	
2026	Kara	Tamil	
2026	Breakfast	Tamil	
2026	Arulvaan	Tamil	
2026	Srinivasa Mangapuram	Telugu	
2026	Magudam	Tamil	
2026	Vishwanath & Sons	Tamil	
2026	Irumudi	Telugu	
2026	Mandaadi	Tamil	
2026	Nayyi Navelli	Hindi	
2026	Aakasamlo Oka Tara	Telugu	

^{#}Film score by another composer
^{#2}Soundtrack by another composer

==== Upcoming films as composer ====
Year	Title	Language	Notes
2026	Aayiram Jenmangal	Tamil	
2026	Mental Manadhil	Tamil	
2026	Sri Sri	Telugu	
2026	Hello Kadhal	Telugu	Tamil
2026	Vettuvam		Tamil
2026	Pocket Novel		Tamil

=== As playback singer ===
Film songs

Year	Film	Song(s)	Language	Composer	Notes
1993	Thiruda Thiruda	"Thiruda Thiruda"	Tamil	A. R. Rahman	
1993	Donga Donga	"Aakathayi Okkadanta"	Telugu	A. R. Rahman	Dubbed version of Thiruda Thiruda
1993	Gentleman	"Chikku Bukku Rayile"	Tamil	A. R. Rahman	
1993	Gentleman	"Chikubuku Raile"	Telugu	A. R. Rahman	Dubbed version of Gentleman
1993	Uzhavan	"Kaathu Kaathu Dinam Kaathu"	Tamil	A. R. Rahman	
1993	Uzhavan	"Maari Mazhai Peyaadho"	Tamil	A. R. Rahman	
1994	May Madham	"Madrasai Suthi", "Palakkattu Machanukku"	Tamil	A. R. Rahman	
1995	Bombay	"Kuchi Kuchi"	Tamil; Hindi; Telugu	A. R. Rahman	Including dubbed versions
1995	Indira	"Ini Achamillai"	Tamil	A. R. Rahman	
1995	Aasai	"Shockkadikuthu Sona"	Tamil	Deva	
1995	Muthu	"Kuluvalilae"	Tamil	A. R. Rahman	
1998	Hrudayanjali	"Madarasu Chuttivaste"	Telugu	A. R. Rahman	Dubbed version of May Maadham
1999	Suriya Paarvai	"Ganapathi Thatha"	Tamil	S. A. Rajkumar	
1999	Mudhalvan	"Alagaana Ratchachiye"	Tamil	A. R. Rahman	
2005	Anniyan	"Kadhal Yaanai"	Tamil	Harris Jayaraj	
2005	Aparachit	"Remo"	Hindi	Harris Jayaraj	Dubbed version of Anniyan
2005	Aparachitudu	"Love Elephantla"	Telugu	Harris Jayaraj	Dubbed version of Anniyan
2007	Unnale Unnale	"Hello Miss"	Tamil	Harris Jayaraj	
2007	Neevalle Neevalle	"Hello Miss"	Telugu	Harris Jayaraj	Dubbed version of Unnale Unnale
2010	Aayirathil Oruvan	"Indha Paadhai"	Tamil	G. V. Prakash Kumar	
2010	Yuganiki Okkadu	"Maalai Ninnu"	Telugu	G. V. Prakash Kumar	Dubbed version of Aayirathil Oruvan
2010	Ullasa Utsaha	"Kanasinolage"	Kannada	G. V. Prakash Kumar	
2010	Aadukalam	"Yaathe"	Tamil	G. V. Prakash Kumar	
2010	Va	"Unnai Kann", "Sharp Sharpji"	Tamil	G. V. Prakash Kumar	
2011	Mayakkam Enna	"Pirai Thedum"	Tamil	G. V. Prakash Kumar	
2012	Saguni	"Manasellam Mazhaiye"	Tamil	G. V. Prakash Kumar	
2012	Muppozhudhum Un Karpanaigal	"Oru Murai"	Tamil	G. V. Prakash Kumar	
2012	Thaandavam	"Anicham Poovazhagi", "Adhigaalai Pookal"	Tamil	G. V. Prakash Kumar	
2012	Sundarapandian	"Rekkai Mulaiththen"	Tamil	N. R. Raghunanthan	
2012	Neerparavai	"Para Para"	Tamil	N. R. Raghunanthan	
2013	Madha Yaanai Koottam	"Kona Kondakari"	Tamil	N. R. Raghunanthan	
2013	Naan Rajavaga Pogiren	"Yaarivano"	Tamil	G. V. Prakash Kumar	
2013	Udhayam NH4	"Yaaro Ivan", "Vaa Iravugal"	Tamil	G. V. Prakash Kumar	
2013	Annakodi	"Pothi Vacha"	Tamil	G. V. Prakash Kumar	
2013	Biriyani	"Edhirthu Nil"	Tamil	Yuvan Shankar Raja	
2013	Raja Rani	"Imaye", "Hey Baby"	Tamil	G. V. Prakash Kumar	
2013	Thalaivaa	"Yaar Indha Saalai Oram"	Tamil	G. V. Prakash Kumar	
2013	JK Enum Nanbanin Vaazhkai	"Nee Enna Pesuvaai", "Facebook Login"	Tamil	G. V. Prakash Kumar	
2014	Irumbu Kuthirai	"Penne Penne"	Tamil	G. V. Prakash Kumar	
2014	Naan Sigappu Manithan	"Elelo", "Idhayam Unnai Theduthey"	Tamil	G. V. Prakash Kumar	
2014	Kathai Thiraikathai Vasanam Iyakkam	"Pen Maegam Polavae"	Tamil	Sharreth	
2014	Poriyaalan	"Kan Rendum"	Tamil	M. S. Jones	
2014	Ugly	"Suraj Hai"	Hindi	G. V. Prakash Kumar	
2015	Darling	"Anbe Anbe", "Sattena Idi Mazhai"	Tamil	G. V. Prakash Kumar	
2015	Rajathanthiram	"Yen Idha Paarvaigal"	Tamil	G. V. Prakash Kumar	
2015	Pencil	"Yaarai Polum", "Kangaliliae II", "LED Kannala II"	Tamil	G. V. Prakash Kumar	
2015	Komban	"Appappa"	Tamil	G. V. Prakash Kumar	Co-sung with Shreya Goshal
2015	Idhu Enna Maayam	"Iravaaga Nee"	Tamil	G. V. Prakash Kumar	
2015	Idhu Enna Maayam	"Irukiraai"	Tamil	G. V. Prakash Kumar	
2015	Kaaval	"Un Kannukullara"	Tamil	G. V. Prakash Kumar	
2015	Kaaka Muttai	"Edhai Ninaithom"	Tamil	G. V. Prakash Kumar	
2015	Kaaka Muttai	"Karuppu Karuppu"	Tamil	G. V. Prakash Kumar	
2015	Trisha Illana Nayanthara	"Bittu Padam Di"	Tamil	G. V. Prakash Kumar	
2015	Trisha Illana Nayanthara	"Yenachu Yedhachu"	Tamil	G. V. Prakash Kumar	
2015	Eetti	"Un Swasam"	Tamil	G. V. Prakash Kumar	
2015	Eetti	"Naan Pudicha Mosakutiye"	Tamil	G. V. Prakash Kumar	
2016	Kadavul Irukaan Kumaru	"Gum Zaare"	Tamil	G. V. Prakash Kumar	
2016	Kadavul Irukaan Kumaru	"Hey Paathu Podi"	Tamil	G. V. Prakash Kumar	
2016	Kadavul Irukaan Kumaru	"Nee Pona Theruvula"	Tamil	G. V. Prakash Kumar	
2016	Bruce Lee	"Sugar Mint-u Kari"	Tamil	G. V. Prakash Kumar	
2016	Adra Machan Visilu	"Yaru Iva"	Tamil	N. R. Raghunandan	
2016	Theri	"Eena Meena Teeka"	Tamil	G. V. Prakash Kumar	
2017	Mersal	"Mersal Arasan"	Tamil	A. R. Rahman	
2018	Naachiyaar	"Unna Vitta Yaarum Illa"	Tamil	Ilayaraja	
2018	Lakshmi	"Ala Ala"	Tamil	Sam C. S.	
2019	Sarvam Thaala Mayam	"Peter Beata Edhu"	Tamil	A. R. Rahman	
2019	100% Kadhal	"Kannum Kannum Plus"	Tamil	G. V. Prakash Kumar	
2019	100% Kadhal	"Oru Vaanam"	Tamil	G. V. Prakash Kumar	
2019	Party	"Thean Pudhu Thean"	Tamil	Premgi Amaren	Unreleased film
2019	Vanigan	"Vaadi Muttakanni"	Tamil	Suresh Kumar T R and Bhuvanesh Selvanesan	
2019	Asuran	"Pollatha Boomi"	Tamil	G. V. Prakash Kumar	
2020	Soorarai Pottru	"Usurey"	Tamil	G. V. Prakash Kumar	
2021	Anandham Vilayadum Veedu	"Nee En Usuru Pulla"	Tamil	Siddhu Kumar	
2021	Bagheera	"Psycho Raja"	Tamil	Ganesan Sekar	
2022	Etharkkum Thunindhavan	"Vaada Thambi"	Tamil	D Imman	Co-sung with Anirudh Ravichander
2022	Koogle Kuttappa	"Alai Alai"	Tamil	Ghibran	
2022	Yaanai	"Bodhaiya Vittu Vaale"	Tamil	G. V. Prakash Kumar	
2022	Yaanai	"Yelamma Yela - Version 2"	Tamil	G. V. Prakash Kumar	
2022	Poikkal Kuthirai	"Singley"	Tamil	D Imman	
2022	Parole	"Vaa Maa Thendral"	Tamil	Rajkumar Amal	
2022	Aneethi	"Thikatta Thikatta Kadhalippom"	Tamil	G. V. Prakash Kumar	
2022	Mathimaran	"Kaththi Koovudhu Kadhal"	Tamil	Karthik Raja	
2022	Mathimaran	"Billion Kudhiraigal"	Tamil	Karthik Raja	
2022	Amigo Garage	"Kaar Irul"	Tamil	Balamurali Balu	
2023	Kalvan	"Adi Kattazhagu Karuvaachi"	Tamil	G. V. Prakash Kumar	
2023	Sooragan	"Thoduvaanam"	Tamil	Achu Rajamani	
2023	Vaazhu Vaazha Vidu	"Cadbury Penne"	Tamil	Karthik Mano	
2023	Saba Nayagan	"Babyma"	Tamil	Leon James	
2024	Lover	"Uyir Vaasame"	Tamil	Sean Roldan	
2024	Ranam Aram Thavarel	"Ponnana Kannu"	Tamil	Arrol Corelli	
2024	Dhonima	"Kaalam Oda"	Tamil	EJ Johnson	
2024	Puyalil Oru Thoni	"Hey Karukaruva"	Tamil	Bhavatharini	
2024	Jolly O Gymkhana	"Oosi Rosy"	Tamil	Ashwin Vinayagamoorthy	
2025	Kudumbasthan	"Kanna Kattikittu"	Tamil	Vaisagh	
2025	Aghathiyaa	"Amma"	Tamil	Yuvan Shankar Raja	
2025	Nilavuku En Mel Ennadi Kobam	"Golden Sparrow"	Tamil	G. V. Prakash Kumar	
2025	Nilavuku En Mel Ennadi Kobam	"Yedi"	Tamil	G. V. Prakash Kumar	
2025	Veera Dheera Sooran	"Aaathi Adi Aaathi"	Tamil	G. V. Prakash Kumar	
2025	Good Bad Ugly	"OG Sambavam"	Tamil	G. V. Prakash Kumar	
2026	Parasakthi	"Ratnamala"	Tamil	G. V. Prakash Kumar	Lyrics by Jayashree Mathimaran, Ramajogayya Sastry
2026	Parasakthi	"Muthaarame"	Tamil	G. V. Prakash Kumar	Lyrics by Jayashree Mathimaran; co-sung with Saindhavi
2026	Parasakthi	"Ratnamala"	Telugu	G. V. Prakash Kumar	Lyrics by Ramajogayya Sastry
2026	Kara	"Ayya Ayya"	Tamil	G. V. Prakash Kumar	Lyrics by Yugabharathi
2026	Pyaar Prema Kalyanam	"Love is Beautiful"	Tamil	Yuvan Shankar Raja	
2026	Hi	"Kannakuzhiya"	Tamil	Jen Martin	
2026	Ramayana: Part 1	"Ravana Tandavam"	Tamil	A. R. Rahman	Co-sung with Anirudh Ravichander
2026	Aakasamlo Oka Tara	"Radhe Radhe"	Telugu	G. V. Prakash Kumar	Co-sung with Lipsika Bhashyam

Album songs

Year	Album	Song	Co-singer(s)	Lyrics	Composer	Notes
2021	Login	"No Mattum Sollu"	Srinisha Jayaseelan	Tamil Mani	Vibin R	

Independent songs

Year	Song(s)	Composer	Co-singer(s)	Notes
2022	Vaadi En Chellakutty	Arul Raj	Sanjana Kalmanje	
2021	Hey Singari	Arul Raj		
2020	High & Dry	Julia Gartha		
2022	Money	IC 9nerz	Bankrollsyoung, S Ghost	
2023	Love Kuthu	Barath Raghavan		
2024	Kaakarattan	Vidya Vox		

== Filmography ==
=== As Actor ===
†	Denotes films that have not yet been released

Year	Title	Role	Notes
2008	Kuselan	Himself	Cameo appearance in "Cinema Cinema" song
2013	Naan Rajavaga Pogiren	Himself	Cameo appearance in "College Paadam" song
2013	Thalaivaa	Dancer	Cameo appearance in "Vaanganna" song
2015	Darling	Kathir	
2015	JK Enum Nanbanin Vaazhkai	Himself	Cameo appearance in "Who is JK" song
2015	Trisha Illana Nayanthara	Jeeva	
2016	Pencil	Shiva	
2016	Enakku Innoru Per Irukku	Johnny	
2016	Kadavul Irukaan Kumaru	Kumar	
2017	Bruce Lee	Bruce Lee (Gemini Ganesan)	
2017	Anbanavan Asaradhavan Adangadhavan	Jeeva	Cameo appearance
2018	Naachiyaar	Kaathavarayan	
2018	Semma	Kulandaivelu	
2019	Sarvam Thaala Mayam	Peter Johnson	
2019	Kuppathu Raja	Rocket	
2019	Watchman	Bala	
2019	Sivappu Manjal Pachai	Madhan	
2019	100% Kadhal	Balu	
2021	Vanakkam Da Mappilei	Aravind	
2021	Bachelor	Darling	
2021	Jail	Karuna	
2022	Selfie	Kanal	
2022	Ayngaran	Mathi	
2023	Adiyae	Jeeva / Arjun Prabhakaran	
2024	Rebel	Kathiresan	
2024	Kalvan	Kembaraju	
2024	DeAr	Arjun	
2024	Trap City	Doctor	English film
2025	Nilavuku En Mel Ennadi Kobam	Himself	Special appearance in "Pulla" song
2025	Kingston	Kingston "King"	25th Film
2025	Blackmail	Mani	
2026	Lucky the Superstar	Lakshman "Lucky"	Released on JioHotstar
2026	Happy Raj	Ananda "Happy" Raj	
2026	Immortal	Magi	

=== As producer ===
- Madha Yaanai Koottam (2013)
- Kingston (2025)

=== As dubbing artist ===
Year	Film	Actor	Role	Notes
1994	Lion King		Young Simba	For Tamil dubbed version
2021	99 Songs	Ehan Bhat		For Tamil dubbed version

=== Television ===
Year	Name of Television Show	Role	Network
2024	Super Singer Season 10	Guest	Star Vijay

== Awards and nominations ==
Film	Award	Category	Result	Ref
Aayirathil Oruvan	58th Filmfare Awards South	Best Music Director	Nominated	
Madrasapattinam	58th Filmfare Awards South	Best Music Director	Nominated	
Madrasapattinam	5th Vijay Awards	Best Music Director	Nominated	
Madrasapattinam	Edison Awards 2011	Best Music Director	Won	
Madrasapattinam	Mirchi Music Awards South 2011	Best Music Director	Nominated	
Madrasapattinam	Mirchi Music Awards South 2011	Best Song of the Year – "Pookal Pookum"	Won	
Madrasapattinam	Norway Tamil Film Festival Awards	Best Music Director	Won	
Madrasapattinam	Norway Tamil Film Festival Awards	Best Song of the Year – "Pookal Pookum"	Won	
Aadukalam	Ananda Vikatan Cinema Awards 2012	Best Music Director	Won	
Aadukalam	59th Filmfare Awards South	Best Music Director	Won	
Aadukalam	59th Filmfare Awards South	Best Male Playback Singer for "Yathe Yathe"	Nominated	
Aadukalam	Mirchi Music Awards South 2012	Best Music Director	Won	
Aadukalam	Mirchi Music Awards South 2012	Listener's Choice Award − Song for "Yathe Yathe"	Won	
Aadukalam	Mirchi Music Awards South 2012	Best Album of the Year	Won	
Aadukalam	1st SIIMA Awards	Best Music Director — Tamil	Won	
Aadukalam	6th Vijay Awards	Best Music Director	Won	
Aadukalam	Vijay Music Awards 2012	Best Song Sung by a Music Director for – "Yathe Yathe"	Won	
Aadukalam	Vijay Music Awards 2012	Best Folk Song of the Year – "Otha Sollaala"	Won	
Aadukalam	Vijay Music Awards 2012	Popular Album of the Year	Won	
Deiva Thirumagal	59th Filmfare Awards South	Best Music Director – Tamil	Nominated	
Deiva Thirumagal	Mirchi Music Awards South 2012	Listener's Choice Best Song for ("Arariro")	Won	
Deiva Thirumagal	Mirchi Music Awards South 2012	Listener's Choice Best Album	Won	
Deiva Thirumagal	6th Vijay Awards	Best Background Score	Nominated	
Mayakkam Enna	Vijay Music Awards 2012	Popular Duet - "Pirai Thedum" (shared with Saindhavi)	Won	
Thaandavam	MTV Awards 2012	Best Regional Music Video – "Uyirin Uyire"	Won	
Thaandavam	60th Filmfare Awards South	Best Music Director	Nominated	
Neerparavai	60th Filmfare Awards South	Best Male Playback Singer for "Para Para"	Nominated	
Neerparavai	2nd SIIMAAwards	Best Male Singer for "Para Para"	Nominated	
Paradesi	BFI London Film Festival 2013	Best Music	Nominated	
Paradesi	Techofes Awards 2014	Best Music Director	Won	
Paradesi	61st Filmfare Awards South	Best Music Director – Tamil	Nominated	
Thalaivaa	61st Filmfare Awards South	Best Male Playback Singer - "Yaar Indha"	Nominated	
Raja Rani	Edison Awards 2013	Best Background Score	Won	
Raja Rani	8th Vijay Awards	Favourite Song- "Hey Baby"	Nominated	
Raja Rani	8th Vijay Awards	Best Music Director	Nominated	
Raja Rani	8th Vijay Awards	Best Background Score	Nominated	
Raja Rani	3rd SIIMA Awards	Best Music Director	Nominated	
Darling	63rd Filmfare Awards South	Best Male Debut	Won	
Darling	5th South Indian International Movie Awards	Best Debut Actor	Won	
Darling	5th South Indian International Movie Awards	Best Male Singer for "Anbe Anbe"	Nominated	
Theri	64th Filmfare Awards South	Best Music Director	Nominated	
Asuran	Zee Cine Tamil Awards 2020	Best Background Score	Won	
Asuran	Osaka Tamil International Film Festival Awards 2020	Best Music Director	Won	
Asuran	9th SIIMA Awards	Best Music Director	Nominated	
Soorarai Pottru	10th SIIMA Awards	Best Music Director – Tamil	Won	
Soorarai Pottru	Edison Awards 2022	Best Music Director	Nominated	
Soorarai Pottru	68th National Film Awards	Best Music Direction – Score	Won	
Soorarai Pottru	67th Filmfare Awards South	Best Music Director	Won	
Soorarai Pottru	Blacksheep Digital Awards 2021	Sensational Music Director	Won	
Soorarai Pottru	Mirchi Music Awards South 2021	Music Composer of The Year – Tamil	Nominated	
Thalaivii	10th South Indian International Movie Awards	Best Music Director – Tamil	Nominated	
Vaathi	69th Filmfare Awards South	Best Music Director – Tamil	Nominated	
Vaathi	71st National Film Awards	Best Music Direction	Won	
Amaran	13th South Indian International Movie Awards	Best Music Director – Tamil	Won	
Amaran	70th Filmfare Awards South	Best Music Director – Tamil	Won	
Amaran	72nd National Film Awards	Best Background Score	Won	
