= Trisha Illana Nayanthara =

2015 Indian film by Adhik Ravichandran

- Theatrical release poster
- Directed by: Adhik Ravichandran
- Written by: Adhik Ravichandran
- Produced by: CJ Jayakumar
- Starring: G. V. Prakash Kumar; Anandhi; Manisha Yadav
- Cinematography: Richard M. Nathan
- Edited by: Ruben
- Music by: G. V. Prakash Kumar
- Production company: Cameo Films
- Distributed by: Studio Green
- Release date: 17 September 2015
- Country: India
- Language: Tamil

Trisha Illana Nayanthara (transl. If Not Trisha, Then Nayanthara) is a 2015 Indian Tamil language sex comedy film written and directed by Adhik Ravichandran, in his directorial debut. The film stars G. V. Prakash Kumar, Anandhi and Manisha Yadav, with VTV Ganesh and Simran portraying supporting roles. The film was released on 17 September 2015.

== Plot ==
Jeeva recounts to a ticket collector why he left home and is travelling to Kumbakonam.

Jeeva was born on the same day as Aditi and Ramya in the same hospital room because of a shortage of private rooms. The three grow up together, and Jeeva becomes especially close to his uncle Vishu, from whom he regularly seeks advice about relationships.

While they are in higher secondary school, Aditi leaves for Bangalore for a week. During her absence, Jeeva and Ramya fall in love. Although Jeeva hesitates to confess his feelings, Ramya proposes to him, and he accepts. They spend the night together, but the following day Jeeva inadvertently reveals their sexual encounter to a friend. As rumours spread through the school, Ramya, humiliated by the breach of trust, ends their relationship and leaves Chennai. As she departs, Aditi telephones Jeeva, confesses her love, and he agrees to begin a relationship with her.

After nearly three years together, Jeeva discovers that Aditi drinks alcohol. Because he strongly disapproves of women drinking, he persuades her to stop. When he later finds her drinking again at a club, he publicly berates her, becomes emotionally distraught, and has to be forcibly removed. Having finished recounting his story, Jeeva arrives in Kumbakonam to stay with Vishu.

Vishu advises Jeeva that if one relationship fails, another opportunity will come along. Jeeva unexpectedly encounters Ramya at the railway station and develops feelings for her again, but she rejects his attempts to reconcile because of his past betrayal. On Vishu's advice, Jeeva enlists the help of Ramya's aunt, Simran. With Simran's support, he gradually wins back Ramya's affection.

Just as they are about to reunite, Jeeva asks Ramya five questions about the three years they spent apart. His final question is whether she is a virgin. Initially offended, Ramya eventually admits that she is not, having had sex with her former boyfriend, Harish, after their breakup. Angered by her confession, Jeeva demands that Harish be called. Harish arrives and explains that they had sex only once, but Jeeva angrily insults them both before leaving. Ramya and Harish subsequently reconcile.

Disillusioned, Jeeva decides to return to Chennai. He tells Vishu that he wants to marry only a virgin, but Vishu criticises his attitude, arguing that such expectations are unrealistic. Jeeva nevertheless refuses to change his views and rushes to board his departing train. As it pulls away, a young woman named Priya extends a hand to help him aboard.

Jeeva thanks Priya, sits beside her, and begins flirting with her. When she says she is travelling to Trichy, he decides to follow her, implying that he has already set his sights on another romance. The film ends with Jeeva saying, "Trisha Illana Nayanthara" (if not Trisha, then Nayanthara).

== Cast ==
- G. V. Prakash Kumar as Jeeva
  - Ray Paul as young Jeeva
- Anandhi as Ramya
  - Sathanya as young Ramya
- Manisha Yadav as Aditi
  - Rakshana as young Aditi
- Simran as Simran, Ramya's aunt
- VTV Ganesh as Vishu, Jeeva's uncle
- Yugi Sethu as Vikram, a scientist and Simran's husband
- G. Marimuthu as Jeeva's father
- Robo Shankar as Auto Driver
- Shanmugasundaram as Ticket Collector
- Jyothi Lakshmi as Aditi's grandmother
- Lollu Sabha Manohar as CD Raghunathan
- Neelu
- Baby Hariharan as Joshua (David Pulla)
- Arya as Harish, Ramya's lover (cameo appearance)
- Priya Anand as Priya (cameo appearance)
- Adhik Ravichandran in a cameo appearance
- Agilan Pushparaj as Aditi's friend
- Jeyan Vignesh

== Production ==
The film was first announced in late December 2013, when G. V. Prakash Kumar revealed that he would be working on a film with debutant director Adhik Ravichandran for a "romantic comedy along the lines of Selvaraghavan movies, with Soodhu Kavvum treatment". The project was confirmed in March 2014 with a tentative title of Trisha Illana Nayanthara announced, and veteran director Bharathiraja and actress Sridevi were approached to play supporting roles, though neither subsequently were signed. As the film featured the names of two prominent actresses in the Tamil film industry, the respective actresses, Trisha and Nayanthara had to provide a No Objection Certificate, permitting the team to register the title. The title was an amendment of Vadivelu's dialogue "Trisha illana Divya" (transl. If Not Trisha, Then Divya) from Thalai Nagaram (2006). Actresses Anandhi and Manisha Yadav were signed on to play the lead actresses. To prepare for his role, Prakash undertook a diet regime and sported a thick beard.

Simran was revealed to also be a part of the cast in February 2015, and made a comeback to Tamil films after a brief hiatus. Priya Anand shot with the team in June 2015, making a guest appearance in the film. Arya also was selected by the team to portray another cameo role in the film.

== Soundtrack ==
G. V. Prakash Kumar composed the music. Sony Music released the soundtrack album on 4 June 2015.

== Soundtrack ==
Trisha Illana Nayanthara

Soundtrack album by G. V. Prakash Kumar
- Released: 4 June 2015
- Recorded: 2015
- Genre: Soundtrack
- Length: 22:31
- Label: Sony Music India
- Producer: G. V. Prakash Kumar

G. V. Prakash Kumar chronology
Kaaka Muttai (2015)	Trisha Illana Nayanthara (2015)	Eetti (2016)

Track listing
No.	Title	Lyrics	Singer(s)	Length
1.	"Yennachu Yedhachu"	Kabilan	G. V. Prakash Kumar, Kalyani Pradeep, Saindhavi	05:19
2.	"Bittu Padam Di"	Rokesh	Adhik Ravichandran, G. V. Prakash Kumar	03:47
3.	"Dakalti"	Andrea Jeremiah, Rokesh	Andrea Jeremiah, Anthony Daasan, Gana Bala	04:13
4.	"Mutham Kodutha Maayakaari"	Na. Muthukumar	Yuvan Shankar Raja	03:36
5.	"Trisha Illana Nayanthara"	Arunraja Kamaraj	Arunraja Kamaraj, Pushpavanam Kuppusamy	02:30
6.	"Rain Dance - A TIN Theme" (Instrumental)	-	-	03:09
Total length:				22.34

== Release ==
The film's distribution rights were bought by Studio Green in May 2015, who purchased the film after being impressed with the teaser. While the film was given an "A" (adults only) certificate by the Central Board of Film Certification, it received a 12A rating from the British Board of Film Classification, which allowed viewers under 18 years of age to watch it. The film released worldwide on 17 September 2015.

== Critical reception ==
Baradwaj Rangan from The Hindu wrote, "Where the director really chickens out is in not pushing his 'A' rating far enough. At a time when films claim they are made for 'family audiences' despite having the worst innuendos, here's someone being honest — he's saying his film is strictly for adults. But why, then, waste so much time on songs and a soggy romantic subplot...? After all, you've pretty much torched Thamizh kalaacharam with your heroines — why not gross us out all the way? But I wouldn't write Adhik Ravichandran off. He has a good ear for laugh-out-loud dialogue and a good eye for the absurd." Similarly, Indo-Asian News Service wrote, "Trisha Illana Nayanthara was promoted as the boldest Tamil film of this generation, and as strictly intended for adults. It's bold to an extent, but not quite enough and that's disappointing, considering it was Tamil cinema's first attempt at the genre and I wish they had gone all the way" and that "Adhik is a filmmaker you can't easily write off." The Times of India gave 3 stars out of 5 and wrote, "There are innumerable innuendos...and adult comedy...and misogynist dialogues, but they do not come across as exploitative but rather harmless fun. And the film also has moments of genuine absurdity...that prove us that the director clearly knows what he is doing." Sify wrote, "Trisha Illana Nayanthara is uninhibited and naughty which has enough frenzied moments to keep the youth audiences in splits." Rediff.com gave 2 stars out of 5 and wrote, "Director Adhik Ravichandran's Trisha Illana Nayanthara is no sensitive coming-of-age film, but rather a prejudiced portrayal of modern day youngsters discovering their sexuality."
