= Kenanya Films =

Indian film production company

- Type: Private
- Industry: Film, Producer
- Founded: 2013; 13 years ago
- Headquarters: Chennai, Tamil Nadu, India
- Key people: J. Selvakumar Pon Pandian
- Products: Film Production
- Parent: Film
- Website: http://www.kenanyafilms.com

Kenanya Films is an Indian film production company based in Chennai. The company was founded in 2013 by J Selvakumar. They have produced several Tamil films.

== History ==
The company first produced the film Thirudan Police starring Dinesh, Aishwarya Rajesh, Bala Saravanan, in 2014.

Despite announcing several projects in the late 2010s, the studio has experienced financial problems which has resulted in several of their proposed releases to be indefinitely postponed or shelved. Anand Balki's comedy drama Server Sundaram starring Santhanam began production in late 2015 and was completed in mid-2016, but still remains unreleased. The film has set release dates several times before being pulled due to the studio's financial constraints. Ra. Karthik's directorial debut Vaan was announced in January 2017 but the shoot has been indefinitely put on hold despite a soft launch event in December 2018. Two films starring Ashok Selvan, Prashanth Pandiyaraj's Jack and Swathi's Senorita opposite Wamiqa Gabbi, were also announced but have not progressed.

== Filmography ==
Year	Title	Cast	Director	Ref.
2014	Thirudan Police	Dinesh, Aishwarya Rajesh, Bala Saravanan	Caarthick Raju	
2016	Oru Naal Koothu	Dinesh, Miya, Nivetha Pethuraj	Nelson Venkatesan	
2017	Bruce Lee	G. V. Prakash Kumar, Kriti Kharbanda, Bala Saravanan	Prashanth Pandiraj	
2017	Ulkuthu	Dinesh, Nandita Swetha, Bala Saravanan	Caarthick Raju	
TBA	Server Sundaram	Santhanam, Vaibhavi Shandilya, Mayilsamy, Shanmugarajan, SwaminathanRadha Ravi	Anand Balki	
