= Ninu Veedani Needanu Nene =

2019 Telugu adult romantic thriller film

- First look poster
- Directed by: Caarthick Raju
- Written by: Caarthick Raju
- Produced by: Dayapannem; Vijisubramanian; Sundeep Kishan
- Starring: Sundeep Kishan; Anya Singh
- Cinematography: P. K. Varma
- Edited by: Praveen K. L.
- Music by: S. Thaman
- Production company: Venkatadari Talkies
- Distributed by: AK Entertainments
- Release date: 12 July 2019
- Country: India
- Language: Telugu
- Box office: ₹7.05 crore

Ninu Veedani Needanu Nene (transl. I'm the shadow that doesn't leave you) is a 2019 Indian Telugu supernatural romantic thriller film written and directed by Caarthick Raju. The film stars Sundeep Kishan and Anya Singh in the lead roles. The film was simultaneously shot in Tamil titled Kannaadi; however, the Tamil version remains unreleased. The music of the film was composed by S. Thaman and was theatrically released on 12 July 2019.

== Plot ==
Rishi and Diya are college youngsters who married each other without their parents' approval. After taking a detour while returning home after celebrating Diya's birthday, a distracted Rishi drives their car into a road roller parked on the side of a deserted road. After recovering from the shock, they step out of the car and approach a flickering light, which turns out to the funeral pyre at a crematorium. Upon the scared Diya's insistence, they return home and find that each of their reflections shows a different face. What caused this change and whether the couple recover from this trauma forms the rest of the story.

== Cast ==
- Sundeep Kishan as Arjun/Rishi
- Anya Singh as Madhavi/Diya (Voiced by Chinmayi)
- Vennela Kishore as Rishi/Arjun
- Divya Ganesh as Diya/Madhavi
- Murali Sharma as Dr. Tharun
- Poornima Bhagyaraj as Arjun's mother
- Pragathi as Lalitha, Rishi's mother
- Posani Krishna Murali as ACP
- Jeeva Ravi as Arjun's father
- Kumaravel as Subbu Reddy
- S. N. Surendar as Church priest
- Sivasankar as Priest
- Kayal Devaraj as Priest
- Malavika Nair and Karthick Naren as Psychology students (cameo appearance)
- Vi Anand as surgeon

== Soundtrack ==
Ninu Veedani Needanu Nene

Soundtrack album by S. Thaman
- Released: 21 July 2019
- Recorded: 2019
- Studio: SPI Music Pvt. Ltd.
- Genre: Feature film soundtrack
- Language: Telugu
- Label: Think Music India

S. Thaman chronology
Simmba (2018)	Ninu Veedani Needanu Nene (2019)	Aruvam (2019)

The music of the film was composed by S. Thaman, and released by Think Music India.

Track listing
No.	Title	Lyrics	Singer(s)	Length
1.	"Excuse Me Rakshasi"	Samrat	Siddharth	3:41
2.	"Amma Song"	Ramajogayya Sastry	Srikrishna, Nandita Jyoti	4:07
3.	"Ninu Veedani Needanu Nene"	Neeraja Kona	Yazin Nizar	3:37

== Release ==
The film was released on 12 July 2019. The Hindi dubbed version titled Main Hoon Sarfira Jigrawala premiered on Sony Max TV channel on 19 September 2022.

== Reception ==
A critic from The Hindu wrote that "This isn’t the smartest film in the horror space, but it tries to bring in something new. If only the taut first half was followed by an equally gripping latter half". A critic from The Times of India wrote, "Ninu Veedani Needanu Nene is promising in parts with entertaining moments but loses steam when it matters the most".

== See also ==
- List of Telugu films of 2019
