= Nene Naa =

2023 Indian Telugu thriller mystery film

- Directed by: Caarthick Raju
- Written by: Caarthick Raju
- Produced by: Raj Shekar Varma
- Starring: Regena Cassandrra; Akshara Gowda; Vennela Kishore; Jayaprakash
- Cinematography: Gokul Benoy
- Edited by: V. J. Sabu Joseph
- Music by: Sam C. S.
- Production company: Appletree Studios Pvt. Ltd.
- Release date: 25 August 2023
- Running time: 138 minutes
- Country: India
- Language: Telugu

Nene Naa..?! (transl. Is it me..?!) is a 2023 Indian Telugu language mystery thriller film directed by Caarthick Raju. The film stars Regena Cassandrra, Akshara Gowda, Vennela Kishore and Jayaprakash.

The plot of the film is set in two time periods, modern and 1920s with Regena Cassandrra playing an archaeologist in the present and Akshara Gowda portraying a girl belonging to a landowners family from the past. The film was simultaneously shot in Tamil as Soorpanagai, and remains unreleased. Its Tamil title is derived from the epic Ramayana's antagonist character Soorpanagai, sister of the king Ravana.

The film was released theatrically on 25 August 2023.

== Plot ==
The film is set in two periods, the present and the 1920s. In modern times an archaeologist, as part of her job, unearths something antique which leads to mysterious events.

A foreigner is attacked and sucked into quicksand by an ethereal force. Archaeologist heroine Divya explores the situation and discovers a 120-year-old woman's skeleton.Shortly after that, the forensic reports say that the skull facial features resemble those of Divya. Shortly after the local DSP was brutally murdered with a spear perched into him.

The forensic report identifies fingerprints on the spear that are consistent with those of a young woman. Heroine Divya tells her brother, who is assaulted by a lady who resembles his sister, about the bizarre occurrences.

== Cast ==
- Regena Cassandrra in a dual role as Divya and Damayanti
- Akshara Gowda as Mallika
- Vennela Kishore as Bobbili Raja
- Jayaprakash as Nalgonda DSP
- Thagubothu Ramesh
- Jeeva Ravi
- Michael
- Kaushik
- Yogi
- Ravi Raja
- K. Sivasankar
- Sampath Ram as Police Inspector R. Venkateshwarulu

== Production ==
Set in two time periods the film has cast of Regina Cassandra and Akshara Gowda. In the current period Regina plays role of an archaeologist while in the period of 1920s, Akshara plays a member of land owners family. The film is shot simultaneously in Tamil and Telugu languages has been titled Soorpanagai in Tamil, and in Telugu it is called Nene Naa..?!. Principal photography began in early March 2020 in a Tamil village Courtallam. The filming resumed on 5 January 2021 after lockdown due to COVID-19 pandemic, and was wrapped up in August 2021.

== Release ==
=== Streaming rights ===
The streaming rights of the movie were later acquired by Aha on 22 September 2023 and it was also released on both Lionsgate Play and Amazon Prime Video on 21 March 2025.

== Reception ==
A critic from The South First wrote that "Except for Vennela Kishore’s humour, this horror thriller is unbearable. The way the reincarnation theme is handled is not so convincing. The backstory of Damayanthi isn’t so exciting".
