= Ivana (actress) =

Indian actress

- Born: Aleena Shaji; February 25, 2000 (age 26); Kerala, India
- Other name: Ivana
- Occupation: Actress
- Years active: 2012–present

Aleena Shaji (born 25 February 2000) known by her stage name Ivana, is an Indian actress who works mainly in Tamil cinema and in addition to a few Malayalam and Telugu films. She began her career as a child actor in Malayalam films, and made her debut in a leading role in Naachiyaar (2018). She later appeared in commercially successful films including Love Today (2022) and Single (2025).

== Career ==
Shaji began her career as a child actor in the Malayalam film industry through supporting role in Masters (2012), before working on Rani Padmini (2015), three years later. Shaji then played the daughter of the lead character in Anuraga Karikkin Vellam (2016). Director Bala had spotted an online news article about Anuraga Karikkun Vellam and subsequently cast Shaji in his Tamil film, Naachiyaar (2018), which also starred Jyothika and G. V. Prakash Kumar. Bala requested that she should use a stage name which would be easier to pronounce for Tamil audiences, and with the assistance of her cousin, she chose the name Ivana. In order to prepare for her role, she undertook Tamil classes, while her co-actors assisted and gave her tips when filming certain scenes. Portraying Arasi, a young, innocent girl, Ivana received praise for her performance. Sify.com noted "with and a pretty fresh face and large expressive eyes, Ivana makes a wholly believable Arasi". Likewise, critics from The Indian Express noted that Ivana makes "an impressive debut", while India Today's reviewer stated that Ivana gives a "splendid performance" and her "expressions are pleasing and pretty convincing".

== Filmography ==
List of Ivana film credits
Year	Title	Role(s)	Language (s)	Notes	Ref.
2012	Masters	Young Daksha	Malayalam		
2015	Rani Padmini	Young Rani	Malayalam		
2016	Anuraga Karikkin Vellam	Anu Raghu	Malayalam		
2018	Naachiyaar		Tamil	Debut Tamil film	
2019	Hero	Mathi	Tamil		
2022	Love Today	Nikitha	Tamil		
2023	LGM: Let's Get Married	Meera	Tamil		
2023	Mathimaran	Mathi	Tamil		
2024	Kalvan	Balamani	Tamil		
2025	Dragon	Harini	Tamil	Cameo appearance	
2025	Single	Harini	Telugu	Debut Telugu film	
2026	Jolliya Iruntha Oruthan	TBA	Tamil		

== Awards and nominations ==
List of Ivana awards and nominations
Year	Award	Category	Work	Result	Ref.
2019	8th SIIMA Awards	Best Debut Actress	Naachiyaar	Nominated	
2019	Filmfare Awards South	Best Supporting Actress	Naachiyaar	Nominated	
