= Bruce Lee (2017 film) =

2017 film by Prasanth Pandiyaraj

- Theatrical release poster
- Directed by: Prasanth Pandiyaraj
- Written by: Prasanth Pandiyaraj
- Produced by: J. Selvakumar; P. Ravichandran; G. Vittal Kumar
- Starring: G. V. Prakash Kumar; Kriti Kharbanda
- Cinematography: P. V. Shankar
- Edited by: Pradeep E. Ragav; G. Manoj Gyann
- Music by: G. V. Prakash Kumar
- Production companies: Kenanya Films; PK Film Factory
- Distributed by: Linga Bhairavi Creations
- Release date: 17 March 2017
- Running time: 125 minutes
- Country: India
- Language: Tamil

Bruce Lee is a 2017 Indian Tamil-language action comedy film written and directed by Prasanth Pandiyaraj in his directoral debut. It stars G. V. Prakash Kumar and Kriti Kharbanda, while Bala Saravanan, Munishkanth, Rajendran, Mansoor Ali Khan, and Anandaraj play supporting roles. The film was produced by Kenaya Films. The music was composed by Prakash with cinematography by P. V. Shankar. The film was released on 17 March 2017.

== Plot ==
Bruce Lee and his friend Abbas are good-for-nothing guys. An evil don named Ramdoss has a gang which assaults people with acid. Lee is in love with Saroja Devi Suprajit, a college student. Once, Ramdoss kills Minister Mansoor Ali Khan, and a photo of the killing is taken by Lee accidentally. With fear, Saroja Devi decides to give it to Mansoor's son but discovers that his son is involved in the killing, so she decides to give the evidence to her uncle, who is a lawyer. Unfortunately, her uncle also defends Ramdoss, and the commissioner asks Ramdoss to find who is shooting them. The next day, the girls are kidnapped by Ramdoss, and he demands the camera from Lee. Whether or not Lee saves Saroja forms the crux of the story.

== Cast ==
- G. V. Prakash Kumar as Bruce Lee (Gemini Ganesan)
- Kriti Kharbanda as Saroja Devi Suprajit
- Bala Saravanan as Abbas
- Munishkanth as Godfather
- Rajendran as Mannikam, Abbas's uncle
- Mansoor Ali Khan as Minister Mansoor Ali Khan
- Anandaraj as Shanmugapandiyan
- Rajapandi
- Shathiga
- Aathma Patrick

== Production ==
The project was first announced in June 2015, when G. V. Prakash Kumar had agreed to work with Prasanth Pandiyaraj on an action comedy film to be produced by Kenanya Films. The title of the film was changed in July 2015 from Baasha Engira Anthony to Bruce Lee, after the makers failed to acquire the relevant permission to use the title from the makers of Baashha (1995). During October 2015, the film had a brief legal tussle with the makers of the 2015 Telugu film Bruce Lee: The Fighter, after they dubbed and released their film in Tamil as Bruce Lee 2. The team of the Tamil production, Bruce Lee, were unable to prevent the release of the Telugu version or its dubbed Tamil version.

Nayanthara was approached to play the leading female role, but her unavailability meant that Kriti Kharbanda, who also appeared in the Telugu Bruce Lee, was signed on to make her debut in Tamil films. The team held a photoshoot in October 2015, with Kharbanda revealing that her and Prakash would portray college students. Production subsequently began a month later. Despite finishing the shoot in early 2016, the film was delayed to allow several of Prakash's other films to have a theatrical release first.

== Soundtrack ==
G. V. Prakash Kumar composed the songs. Lahari Music released the album on 20 October 2016.

Track listing
No.	Title	Lyrics	Singer(s)	Length
1.	"Naan Thaan Goppan Da"	Arunraja Kamaraj	Arunraja Kamaraj	02:42
2.	"Sugar Mint-u Kari"	Mani Kandan	G. V. Prakash Kumar, M. M. Manasi	04:49
3.	"Sumar Moonji Kumaru"	Gana Vinoth	Silambarasan	03:48
Total length:				11:19

== Critical reception ==
The film was panned by the critics as well as audiences and failed at the box office. Vishal Menon of The Hindu wrote "you need a wicked sense of comedy and great actors to pull off this kind of screwball material, but, sadly, there's not a single funny moment", while Thinkal Menon of The Times of India wrote "if spirits could watch films, the spirit of real Bruce Lee will turn into Kanchana and Chandramukhi after watching this absurd film". Sreedhar Pillai wrote for Firstpost, "GV Prakash's Bruce Lee would make the late legend turn in his grave" and that "the film, which was touted as a black comedy, is amateurish and has neither a story nor style".

Malini Mannath of The New Indian Express stated it was a "comedy gone awry", while Sify noted that "Prashanth Pandiraj has a half-cooked script that doesn't know where to go after setting up its delicious premise". Baradwaj Rangan wrote for Film Companion, "Bruce Lee is supposed to be a comedy. The key word supposed. It's actually a tale of revenge."
