= Single (film) =

2025 Indian Telugu film by Caarthick Raju

#Single
- Theatrical release poster
- Directed by: Caarthick Raju
- Screenplay by: Caarthick Raju
- Story by: Caarthick Raju
- Dialogues by: Nandu Savirigana; Bhanu Bogavarapu
- Produced by: Vidya Koppineedi; Bhanu Pratapa; Riyaz Chowdary
- Starring: Sree Vishnu; Ketika Sharma; Ivana; Vennela Kishore
- Cinematography: R. Velraj
- Edited by: Praveen K. L.
- Music by: Vishal Chandrashekhar
- Production companies: Geetha Arts; Kalya Films
- Release date: 9 May 2025
- Running time: 129 minutes
- Country: India
- Language: Telugu
- Box office: ₹34.65 crore

Single (stylized as #Single) is a 2025 Indian Telugu-language romantic comedy film directed by Caarthick Raju and presented by Allu Aravind. The film was produced by Geetha Arts and Kalya Films. It stars Sree Vishnu, Ketika Sharma, Ivana and Vennela Kishore in the lead roles. The music was composed by Vishal Chandrashekhar.

The film was theatrically released on 9 May 2025 to positive reviews from critics and became a box office success.

== Plot ==
Vijay, a bank employee, falls in love with Purva Nettem at first sight and attempts to get closer to her in hopes of winning her affection. Meanwhile, Harini who secretly harbours feelings for Vijay, begins to follow him. The story unfolds as Vijay gradually learns about Harini's identity and intentions, while Purva comes to understand Vijay's true feelings and motivations.

== Cast ==
- Sree Vishnu as Vijay
- Ketika Sharma as Purva Nettem, Vijay's love interest
- Ivana as Harini
- Vennela Kishore as Aravind
- VTV Ganesh as Aravind's boss
- Kalpa Latha as Harini's mother
- Rajendra Prasad as ASN Murthy, Harini's father
- Prabhas Sreenu as a rowdy hired by Vijay
- Kirrak Seetha as Purva's friend
- Satya as Surendra, Purva's groom
- Narne Nithin as Nithin (cameo appearance)
- Reba Monica John as Ileana, Vijay's first crush (cameo appearance)
- Manasa Chaudhary Cherukuri as Mamatha Kulakarni, Vijay's second crush (cameo appearance)

== Production ==
On 29 February 2024, coinciding with Sree Vishnu's birthday, Geetha Arts officially announced the film with the working title #SV18. The official title of the film was revealed as #Single on 10 February 2025.

== Music ==
The soundtrack album and background score for the film were composed by Vishal Chandrashekhar. On 4 April 2025 the first single "Shilpi Yevaro" was released. The lyrics were written by Shreemani and sung by Yazin Nizar. On 17 April 2025, "Sirrakaindhi Single Bathuku" was released with lyrics by Ramajogayya Sastry and sung by Rahul Sipligunj.

No.	Title	Lyrics	Singer(s)	Length
1.	"Shilpi Yevaro"	Shreemani	Yazin Nizar	3:00
2.	"Sirrakaindhi Single Bathuku"	Ramajogayya Sastry	Rahul Sipligunj	3:24

== Release ==
=== Theatrical ===
#Single was theatrically released on 9 May 2025.

=== Home media ===
The digital distribution rights of the film were acquired by Amazon Prime Video. The satellite rights were bought by Zee Telugu.

== Reception ==
Paul Nicodemus of The Times of India awarded the film 3/5 stars, describing it as “a cheerful, no‑fuss comedy that thrives on chemistry, comic timing, and a generous dose of pop culture.” Sanjay Ponnappa of India Today gave the film 3/5 stars and wrote "Single is a light-hearted comedy that blends traditional filmmaking styles with contemporary themes, offering a nostalgic take on humor reminiscent of popular social media trends". Srivathsan Nadadhur of The Hindu stated "Sree Vishnu’s romcom is a bag of outdated tricks, led by Sree Vishnu and Vennela Kishore is a vain attempt at confusion comedy".
