= Server Sundaram (unreleased film) =

Indian film

- Poster with cancelled release date
- Directed by: Anand Balki
- Written by: Anand Balki
- Produced by: J. Selvakumar
- Starring: Santhanam; Vaibhavi Shandilya
- Cinematography: P. K. Varma
- Edited by: Dinesh Ponraj
- Music by: Santhosh Narayanan
- Production companies: Kenanya Films; Miraacle Movies
- Country: India
- Language: Tamil

Server Sundaram is an unreleased Indian Tamil-language comedy drama film written and directed by Anand Balki, and produced by J. Selvakumar. The film stars Santhanam in the titular character alongside Vaibhavi Shandilya. It was filmed in 2016, but failed to have a theatrical release due to distribution issues.

== Cast ==
- Santhanam as K. Sundaram
- Vaibhavi Shandilya as Sanjana
- Bijesh as Raja Pandi
- Kiran Rathod
- Radha Ravi
- Kitty
- Maya S. Krishnan
- Mayilsamy
- Shanmugarajan
- Swaminathan
- Snehan
- Venkatesh Bhat
- Chef Damodharan
- Poonam Shah
- Priyanka Shah
- Kalloori Vinoth
- Gopi Gpr
- Nandagopal
- Ramadoss Rammohan
- Madu Karthiek
- Jan Bostock
- B. Balaji Shankar

== Production ==
In December 2015, debutant director Anand Balki announced that he would be making a film with Santhanam in the lead role and Santhosh Narayanan as music composer. The film was later announced with the title Server Sundaram, with the team having attained permission from AVM Productions, who produced the 1964 film of the same name starring Nagesh. Subsequently, the team also chose to cast Nagesh's grandson, Bijesh, in a supporting role of a catering college student. Major portions of the film were shot in and around SRM Institute of Science and Technology, and Accord Metropolitan Hotel, Chennai.

For his role of a caterer, Santhanam took training at a five-star restaurant and learnt skills from the restaurant's staff. The first look poster of the film was released on 20 January 2016 coinciding with Santhanam's birthday, while the makers revealed that project would be shot in Chennai, Goa and Dubai. In June 2016, the team shot a song with YouTube dancers Poonam and Priyanka Shah in Australia, alongside the lead actors. Filming ended by late October 2016.

== Soundtrack ==
The soundtrack was composed by Santhosh Narayanan. The first single "Hey Bro" was released on 18 February 2017. The audio launch was held on 10 May the same year.

Track listing
No.	Title	Lyrics	Singer(s)	Length
1.	"Bro"	Vivek	Santhosh Narayanan	3:36
2.	"Nirkadhey"	Vivek	Ananthu, Vijay Narain, Santhosh Narayanan	6:18
3.	"Unave Marundhu"	Vivek	Ranjani–Gayatri	5:54
4.	"Gama Gama Samayal"	Vivek	Anthony Daasan, Santhosh Narayanan	4:07
5.	"Kannaal Modhaadhey"	Muthamil	Sid Sriram	4:19
Total length:				24:14

== Release ==
Server Sundaram was originally scheduled for 7 September 2017, before being rescheduled for 29 September. After further delays, it was scheduled for 6 July 2018, before being delayed again to avoid competition with Mr. Chandramouli. After being in deadlock for more than a year, it was scheduled for 31 January 2020, only to be postponed to 14 February to avoid competition with Santhanam's other film, Dagaalty, and then to 21 February. After failing to release on the scheduled date, the film has no new release date, with the director blaming the distributors for ruining the film's release with their "amateur approach". In September 2025, he made social media posts pushing for its release, expressing confidence it would still resonate with audiences. In January 2026, the makers insinuated that the film would release in the same month during the Pongal weekend, but that move did not pan out. Anand later expressed frustration over the continuous delays, saying that while most of the financial issues were cleared, the makers need to clear ₹2.5 crore (US$260,000) to obtain a No Objection Certificate.
