= VTV Ganesh =

Tamil actor, comedian, film producer (born 1961)

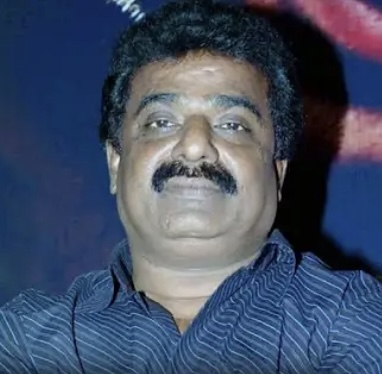
- VTV Ganesh in 2017
- Born: Neelakandan J 21 June 1961 (age 65); Nagercoil, Madras State (now Tamil Nadu), India
- Occupations: Actor; comedian; film producer
- Years active: 2002–present
- Spouse: Rajeswari
- Children: 1

Neelakandan Janardhanan, also known by his stage name VTV Ganesh, is an Indian actor and producer who works in Tamil and Telugu films. He is best known for his hoarse voice, and appearances in films featuring Silambarasan.

He made his debut in the Tamil film Red (2002) directed by Singampuli. He is well-known for his film Vinnaithaandi Varuvaayaa (2010) directed by Gautham Menon, which is the reason that he got 'VTV' (short for Vinnaithaandi Varuvaayaa) moniker.

== Career ==
Prior to VTV, he played small roles in films like Vettaiyaadu Vilaiyaadu (2006), Pachaikili Muthucharam (2007) and Vaaranam Aayiram (2008).

Ganesh made his breakthrough with a role in his home production Vinnaithaandi Varuvaaya (2010) directed by Gautham Vasudev Menon starring Silambarasan and Trisha Krishnan. His portrayal of the fictional cinematographer of Vinaithaandi Varuvaiya (2010) won plaudits from critics and eventually led to him adding a prefix with the initials of the film (VTV). He went on to play a comic role in the anthology film, Vaanam (2011) which he also produced, portraying a character who assists Silambarasan's character. Ganesh also acted in Osthe (2011) featuring Silambarasan in a role as the heroine's father. In 2012, Ganesh played the role of Silambarasan's uncle in Vignesh Shivan’s romantic musical film, Podaa Podi. He was one of the lead characters in Naveena Saraswathi Sabatham (2013). In 2014, he starred, penned, and produced Vincent Selva’s comedy film, Inga Enna Solluthu. He was later cast in few more films including Kappal (2014), Romeo Juliet (2015), Vaalu (2015), Vaaliba Raja (2016), Motta Shiva Ketta Shiva (2017), Sakka Podu Podu Raja (2017) and Kalakalappu 2 (2018). He has also acted in Vijay's films such as Beast (2022), Varisu (2023) and The Greatest of All Time (2024).

== Filmography ==
=== Tamil films ===
Key
†	Denotes films that have not yet been released

List of VTV Ganesh Tamil film acting credits
Year	Title	Role	Notes
2002	Red	District Collector	Uncredited role
2006	Vettaiyaadu Vilaiyaadu	Dharma	credited as Sudhakar
2007	Pachaikili Muthucharam	Sundar	
2008	Vaaranam Aayiram	Anthony	credited as Neelakandan Ganesh
2010	Vinnaithaandi Varuvaaya	Ganesh	Nominated, Vijay Award for Best Supporting Actor
2011	Vaanam	"Bajna" Ganesh	
2011	Osthe	Neduvaali's father	
2012	Podaa Podi	Arjun's uncle	Nominated, Vijay Award for Best Comedian; Nominated, SIIMA Award for Best Comedian
2012	Neethane En Ponvasantham	Ganesh	Guest appearance
2013	Kanna Laddu Thinna Aasaiya	Krishnamoorthy	
2013	Naveena Saraswathi Sabatham	Ganesh	
2014	Inga Enna Solluthu	Ganesh	Also writer and producer; also lyrics and singer for song "Pattampoochi"
2014	Thalaivan		
2014	Vallavanukku Pullum Aayudham	Deergadarsi	
2014	Kappal	Nelson	
2015	JK Enum Nanbanin Vaazhkai	Wedding Guest	Guest appearance
2015	Inimey Ippadithaan	Chandra	
2015	Romeo Juliet	VTV Ganesh	
2015	Vaalu	Kutti Paiya	
2015	Trisha Illana Nayanthara	Vishu	
2016	Vaaliba Raja	Prabhakaran Sethji	
2016	Hello Naan Pei Pesuren	Kavitha's brother	
2016	Pencil	Anthony Gonsalves	
2016	Enakku Innoru Per Irukku	Benjamin	
2016	Muthina Kathirika	Marudhu	
2016	Tamilselvanum Thaniyar Anjalum	AC Shakthivel	
2016	Veera Sivaji	Security Officer	
2017	Motta Shiva Ketta Shiva	Shaktivel	
2017	Shivalinga	N.Murali	
2017	Anbanavan Asaradhavan Adangadhavan	Somu	
2017	Yaanum Theeyavan	Sundaramurthi	
2017	Sakka Podu Podu Raja	J. Neelakandan, Santa's father	
2018	Kalakalappu 2	Sait, Aishwarya's father	
2019	Vantha Rajavathaan Varuven	Roshan	
2019	Iruttu	Head Constable	
2020	Naanga Romba Busy	Oorandai Govindan	Television film
2021	Iruvar Ullam	Kuralarasan	
2021	Tamil Rockers		
2022	Beast	Domnic Irudhayaraj	
2022	Prince	Doctor	
2022	Coffee with Kadhal	Pilot	Cameo
2022	Varalaru Mukkiyam	Adaikalam	
2023	Varisu	Velraj	
2023	Dada	Gokul	
2023	Kasethan Kadavulada	Dr. Elangeeran	
2023	Let's Get Married	Forest officer	
2023	Jailer	Dr. S Dhandapani	
2023	Conjuring Kannappan	Anjanenjan	
2024	Romeo	Arivazhagan and Janani's uncle	
2024	Rathnam	Inspector Muthupandi	Cameo
2024	Aranmanai 4	Carpenter	
2024	The Greatest of All Time	Raghavan	
2024	Brother	Caretaker Keshav	
2025	Aghathiyaa	VTV Ganesh	Cameo
2025	Leg Piece	Lion Nagaraj	
2025	Perusu	Doctor	
2025	Sumo	Jack	
2025	Kiss	Dr. Thirunavukkarasu	
2025	Rambo	Inspector Karmegham	
2025	Aaromaley	Narasimhan	
2026	Leader	Thangapazham	
2026	Love Insurance Kompany	LIK customer	Cameo
2026	Double Occupancy	Raju Bhai	
2026	Con City	Gangadharan	
2026	Dark		
2026	Arulvaan		
2026	Hi	Doctor Shanmugi	

=== Telugu films ===
List of VTV Ganesh Telugu film acting credits
Year	Title	Role	Notes
2010	Ye Maaya Chesave	Film crew member	Uncredited appearance in "Manasaa" song
2023	Bhagavanth Kesari	Minister	
2024	The Family Star	Ramesh	
2024	Aay	Manager Kishore	
2024	Bhale Unnade	Bhanu Prasad	
2024	Viswam	Ticket Collector	
2025	Daaku Maharaaj	Inspector Panthulu	
2025	Sankranthiki Vasthunam	T. V. Ganesh	
2025	Single	Vijay and Aravind's boss	
2025	Ghaati	M. P. Bojjayya	
2025	Tribanadhari Barbarik	Purushottam	
2025	Sundarakanda	Venkata Rao	
2025	Mithra Mandali	Narayana Tutte	
2025	Mass Jathara	Patro's assistant	
2025	Andhra King Taluka	Collector	
2026	The RajaSaab	Mangalam Babai	
2026	Sathi Leelavathi	Tamalapakulu	
2026	Peddi	Station Master	
2026	Korean Kanakaraju	Diwakar	

=== Malayalam films ===
List of VTV Ganesh Malayalam film acting credits
Year	Title	Role	Notes
2023	Bandra	Goswamy	
2024	Turbo	Minister Arivazhagan Chella Durai	

=== As producer ===
List of VTV Ganesh film producer credits
Year	Title	Notes
2010	Vinnaithaandi Varuvaayaa	
2011	Vaanam	
2014	Inga Enna Solluthu	
2017	Sakka Podu Podu Raja	

=== As singer ===
List of VTV Ganesh film singing credits
Year	Title	Song	Notes
2014	Inga Enna Solluthu	"Butterfly"	also lyrics
2014	Kappal	"Friendship"	film version only

=== Dubbing artist ===
List of VTV Ganesh film dubbing artist credits
Year	Title	Actor	Character	Notes	Ref.
2023	Jawan	Naresh Gossain	Agriculture Minister	Tamil dubbed version	
2024	Mufasa: The Lion King		Young Rafiki	Tamil dubbed version	

=== Music videos ===
List of VTV Ganesh music video credits
Year	Title	Artist	Notes	Ref.
2010	"Semmozhiyaana Thamizh Mozhiyaam"	A. R. Rahman	Non-album single	

=== Television ===
Year	Title	Role	Channel	Language	Notes
2024	Cooku with Comali season 5	Contestant	Star Vijay	Tamil	Finalist
