= Inga Enna Solluthu =

2014 Indian film by Vincent Selva

- Theatrical release poster
- Directed by: Vincent Selva
- Written by: VTV Ganesh
- Produced by: VTV Ganesh
- Starring: VTV Ganesh; Meera Jasmine; Santhanam
- Cinematography: R. D. Rajasekhar
- Edited by: Anthony
- Music by: Dharan; Guest composer: Silambarasan (1 song)
- Production company: VTV Productions
- Distributed by: Sri Thenandal films Sun Pictures (presenter)
- Release date: 30 January 2014
- Country: India
- Language: Tamil

Inga Enna Solluthu (transl. What does it say here?) is a 2014 Indian Tamil-language comedy film directed by Vincent Selva, and produced and written by VTV Ganesh who also plays the lead role, with Meera Jasmine and Santhanam in supporting roles. The film released on 30 January 2014.

== Plot ==
Ganesh is a carefree, jobless young man who lives without much responsibility. He spends his time hanging around with his friend Ezhumugam, who constantly teases and comments on his life choices. Ganesh falls in love with a girl and dreams of getting married. However, his biggest problem is that he has no stable job, no direction, and no seriousness about life. Despite this, he somehow manages to convince the girl’s family and gets married. Once married, reality hits hard. Ganesh struggles to take responsibility as a husband. He still behaves immaturely and avoids work. His wife starts getting frustrated with his irresponsible nature. His lack of seriousness creates frequent misunderstandings and conflicts in their relationship.

Things start to fall apart when his wife begins to lose trust in him. His inability to provide and behave responsibly causes emotional distance. At this stage, Ganesh realizes that love alone isn’t enough to sustain a marriage — responsibility and maturity are equally important. Ganesh finally decides to change: He tries to become more responsible. He works on fixing his mistakes. He attempts to win back his wife’s trust. Ganesh learns the importance of responsibility in life and marriage. He starts taking life seriously. The relationship improves as he matures.

== Cast ==
- VTV Ganesh as Ganesh
- Meera Jasmine as Rajeshwari
- Santhanam as Ezhumugam (Sai Baba)
- Pandiarajan as Ramalingam
- Swarnamalya as Subha
- Ammu Ramachandran as Ganesh's sister
- Srinath
- Aarthi
- Ujjaini
- Mayilsamy as himself
- K. S. Ravikumar as himself
- Silambarasan as Raghu (Guest appearance)
- Andrea Jeremiah as Raghu's fiancé (Guest appearance)
- Anthony as Anto (Guest appearance)
- Rajeevan as Rajeevan (Guest appearance)

== Production ==
The title of the film is taken from Ganesh's famous line from Vinnaithaandi Varuvaayaa. The film was shot in locations including Goa, Malaysia and Singapore.

== Soundtrack ==
Inga Enna Solluthu

Soundtrack album to Inga Enna Solluthu by Dharan Kumar
- Released: 5 December 2013
- Recorded: 2013
- Genre: Feature film soundtrack
- Language: Tamil
- Label: Think Music
- Producer: Dharan Kumar

Dharan Kumar chronology
Thagaraaru (2013)	Inga Enna Solluthu (2013)	Aaha Kalyanam (2014)

Soundtrack was composed by Dharan Kumar. The audio launch was done in Suryan FM on 5 December 2013.

- "Kuttipayale" – Silambarasan
- "Appatucker" – Psycho Unit
- "Avan Ivan" – Ramya NSK (lyrics by VTV Ganesh)
- "Cute Aana" – Naresh Iyer (lyrics by Lallu)
- "Ennodu" – Naresh Iyer, Ramya NSK (lyrics by VTV Ganesh)
- "Pattampoochi" – VTV Ganesh (lyrics by VTV Ganesh)
- "Shuklambharatam" – Kalyani Menon

== Critical reception ==
Baradwaj Rangan from The Hindu wrote, "the episodes are so dull, the screenplay so crude and disjointed that we feel we've smoked some pot and slipped into a surreal dream". The Times of India gave 1.5 stars out of 5 and wrote, "This is the stuff of V Sekar's films in the 90s and some of those...were reasonably entertaining despite the didactic filmmaking...but, this film doesn't really have a clue on what it wants to be — a full-on drama, an existential comedy, or even a dramedy". The New Indian Express wrote, "The quick change of locations, crisp editing and Simbu's screen presence hold up the film, which, otherwise, would have been a total downer. It was a knot with potential. Selva could have worked out the screenplay in a more interesting manner".

Sify wrote, "there isn't anything interesting in it. Director V Selva fails to make it interesting, characterisation is weak and it drags big time". Rediff gave 1.5 stars out of 5 and called the film "a total waste of time". IANS gave 1 star out of 5 and wrote, "It is not because Ganesh plays the lead that Inga Enna Solludhu is unarguably boring, but because it is a shoddily written story that fails to entertain. It's a film that makes a success story look like a joke on screen". Deccan Herald wrote, "V T V Ganesh turns Inga Enna Solludhu into a putrefied ego trip, soaked in self-pity, thanks to director Vincent Selva pandering Ganesh's whims without much qualms about his own reputation".
