= Mathimaran =

- Theatrical release poster
- Directed by: Mantra Veerapandian
- Written by: Mantra Veerapandian
- Produced by: Lenin Babu
- Starring: Venkat Senguttuvan; Ivana; Aradhya
- Cinematography: Parvaez K
- Edited by: Sathish Suriya
- Music by: Karthik Raja
- Production company: GS Cinema International
- Release date: 29 December 2023
- Country: India
- Language: Tamil

Mathimaran is a 2022 Indian Tamil-language crime drama film written and directed by Mantra Veerapandian and produced by Lenin Babu. It stars Venkat Senguttuvan and Ivana as the titular characters and Aradhya with M. S. Bhaskar in a supporting role. The music was composed by Karthik Raja with cinematography by Parvaez K and editing by Sathish Suriya. The film was released in theatres on 29 December 2023 and received mixed to positive reviews after releasing in Streaming Media.

The movie centres on a man confronting discrimination due to his physical deformity, exploring how he navigates societal pressures stemming from it.

== Plot ==
A man who faces discrimination based on a physical deformity grapples with the societal pressures that arise because of it.

== Cast ==
- Venkat Senguttuvan as Nedumaaran
- Ivana as Mathi, Nedumaaran's twin
- Aradhya as Sub-Inspector Prabhavathy, Nedumaaran's love interest
- M. S. Bhaskar as Sundaram, Nedumaaran and Mathi's father
- Aadukalam Naren as Police Commissioner Kattabomman
- Bava Chelladurai as Karuppasamy, watchman
- E. Praveen Kumar
- Sudarshan Govind as Sudarshan IPS, Kattabomman's son

== Production ==
The film began production in 2021 and was initially titled Complex.

== Soundtrack ==
Mathimaran

Soundtrack album by Karthik Raja
- Released: 2023
- Recorded: 2022
- Genre: Feature film soundtrack
- Length: 15:36
- Language: Tamil
- Label: Saregama

Karthik Raja chronology
Web (2023)	Mathimaran (2023)	Pisaasu II (2024)

Official audio
- Mathimaran – Full Album on YouTube

Singles from Mathimaran
- 1. "Kaththi Koovudhu Kadhal" Released: 2 November 2022

The music was composed by Karthik Raja.

All lyrics are written by Gnanakaravel and Bala Seetharaman.

Track listing
No.	Title	Singer(s)	Length
1.	"Boologame"	Sid Sriram	3:25
2.	"Kaththi Koovudhu Kadhal"	Saindhavi, G. V. Prakash Kumar	3:30
3.	"Billion Kudhiraigal"	G. V. Prakash Kumar	4:07
4.	"Ithu Nyayamo Iraiva"	Venkat Prabhu	2:17
5.	"Aarariro Chellakanne"	Karthik Raja	2:17
Total length:			15:36

== Reception ==
Narayani M from Cinema Express wrote that the film was "Partly jarring, partly preachy tale on downsides to being vertically challenged". Raiza Nazreen from Times Now wrote that the film breaks "Stereotypes With Compelling Tale Of Love And Intrigue". Roopa Radhakrishnan from The Times of India called the film "relevant but also overly reliant on dialogues". A critic from Dinamalar wrote that "The director keeps the newcomers and budding actors entertained by giving a compelling story. Among the many films that released this week, this film is one that gives hope to newbies. The story and characters taken by the director is the reason for that. Only some cinematic scenes could have been avoided".
