= Ulkuthu =

2017 Tamil-language film directed by Caarthick Raju

- Directed by: Caarthick Raju
- Written by: Caarthick Raju
- Produced by: G Vittal Kumar; Subhashini Devi
- Starring: Dinesh; Nandita Swetha
- Cinematography: P. K. Varma
- Edited by: Praveen K. L.
- Music by: Justin Prabhakaran
- Production company: PK Film Factory
- Release date: 29 December 2017
- Running time: 122 minutes
- Country: India
- Language: Tamil

Ulkuthu (transl. Inject) is a 2017 Tamil-language action comedy drama film directed by Caarthick Raju, featuring Dinesh and Nandita Swetha in the leading roles. The project was first announced in late 2014 and finished production in September 2016.

== Plot ==
Saravanan's men chase a police inspector through the streets. The inspector falls down, and the men beat him. Saravanan arrives at the spot in a car, and he stabs the inspector after hitting his men, and his brother swears revenge. Meanwhile, Raja saves Sura Shankar after Shankar's friends chase him on the beach. Raja tells Shankar that he is an MBA graduate and becomes friends with him. He falls in love with Kadalarasi, Shankar's sister. Shankar works as a fishmonger at the local market. Shankar's friend comes with Shankar's leader to ask for Kadalarasi's hand in marriage, but Shankar tells his leader that Raja is his sister's groom.

After Shankar insults a man at the beach when he is with a girl from his locality, the man beats up Shankar. Because of this, Raja arrives and beats up the man. Shankar's leader appears and informs him that he beat up Saravanan's right-hand man, Kasi. Shankar reveals that Saravanan is the son of Kaakkamani, a ruthless loan shark and fisherman who commits murders. Saravanan and his gang chase and surround Raja at a market. Saravanan initially beats up Raja, but Raja retaliates and thrashes Saravanan, shaming him publicly. Kaakkamani hears the news of Saravanan's beating and plays kabaddi with his men to settle his anger. He grabs Kasi in a headlock and twists his neck, killing him. He calls Saravanan to play kabaddi and grasps him in a headlock, telling him that Raja should die. At a canoe racing competition, Raja lets Saravanan win. He believes that Raja purposely shamed Saravanan and plans to kill him. Sekar calls Raja to Kaakkamani's place. However, after playing a game of kabaddi, Raja lies to Kaakkamani and says he let Saravanan win for Kaakkamani's prestige. Kaakkamani forgives him, and Saravanan becomes friends with Raja.

After being instigated by Kasi's mother, Saravanan's men plan to kill Saravanan. Saravanan gets wounded but escapes the murder attempt by his men. Saravanan runs to the beach, and Raja takes Saravanan on a boat with Shankar to the sea. Raja suddenly stabs Saravanan and pushes him into the sea. Saravanan's men tell Raja that Saravanan is dead, and Raja pulls a drama and beats them. Kaakkamani is upset at Saravanan's murder. Raja unwraps the burial shroud and shows a stab wound near his left abdomen. He reveals that someone stabbed Saravanan. Kaakkamani trusts Raja and tells him to find Saravanan's murderer, oblivious that Raja stabbed Saravanan. After Kadalarasi sees Raja beating Kaakkamani's goon, Raja narrates his past to her.

Past: Raja was a flower vendor who lived with his sister and his brother-in-law, Shanmugam. Shanmugam worked as an auto driver, and his best friend was Sekar. Shanmugam was also working as a rowdy for Saravanan. After Saravanan slaps a debtor's wife at Saravanan's godown, Shanmugam slaps Saravanan. In retaliation, Saravanan hits Shanmugam with a pipe. Saravanan's men bring Raja's sister to the godown, and Saravanan stabs Shanmugam and slams Raja's sister against a wall, killing her. Shanmugam eventually dies. Raja is upset at their deaths. Sekar gets upset and tells Raja what happened. Raja lies and says that he studied business administration, befriended Shankar, and told Saravanan he was Shanmugam's brother-in-law before Saravanan died. He gained Kaakkamani's trust to carry out his revenge.

Present: Shankar discovers Raja's background. Saravanan's men find Shanmugam's auto and look inside his house to see a family photo of Raja, Shanmugam, and Raja's sister. Meanwhile, Sekar brings Raja to Kaakkamani's place and tells him that Kaakkamani will not be a problem for him. Kakkamani brings the brother of the police officer that Saravanan killed, and Kaakkamani plans to kill him. Saravanan's men arrive at Kaakkamani's place and reveal that he killed Saravanan before Saravanan's men did. But Raja reveals that Sekar was the one who planned the murder, and Sekar emotionally divulges that Shanmugam was his best friend for 25 years, and his rage built up to kill Saravanan. Raja and Kaakkamani fight, and Raja spares Kaakkamani, emotionally telling him that he does not want to become a rowdy by killing him. He informs the others that if they leave him, Kaakkamani will kill them. They beat and kill him as Raja walks away.

== Cast ==
- Dinesh as Raja
- Nandita Swetha as Kadalarasi, Raja's love interest
- Bala Saravanan as Sura Shankar
- Sharath Lohitashwa as Kaakkamani
- Chaya Singh as Raja's sister
- John Vijay as Shanmugam, Raja's brother-in-law
- Sriman as Sekar, Shanmugam's friend and Kaakkamani's goon
- Dhilip Subbarayan as Saravanan, Kaakkamani's son
- Arjai as Kasi, Saravanan's right-hand man
- Chef Damodharan as Sura Shankar's leader
- Sendrayan as Kadappan
- Muthuraman as Debtor
- Munnar Ramesh as Kaakkamani's goon
- Adithya Kathir as Sura Shankar's friend
- Rajapandi as Gangster, Kasi's Friend
- Blade Shankar
- M.V. Tamilselvi

== Production ==
Following the huge success of Tamil film, Thirudan Police (2014), producer Selvakumar decided to bring together director Caarthick Raju and Dinesh for a further film together. The project was first announced in December 2014, and the shoot starts around August, 2015

The film was predominantly shot around Muttom in Nagercoil, Tamil Nadu and completed within 45 days. The film completed production in November 2015, and it was revealed that Selvakumar would first wait for the release of his other venture with Dinesh, Oru Naal Koothu, to release, before drafting release plans for Ulkuthu.

== Music ==
There are a total of three songs in this movie, composed by Justin Prabhakaran.

Ulkuthu

Soundtrack album by Justin Prabhakaran
- Released: 2016
- Genre: Film soundtrack
- Language: Tamil
- Label: Lahari Music
- Producer: Justin Prabhakaran

Justin Prabhakaran chronology
Raja Manthiri (2016)	Ulkuthu (2016)	Kaalakkoothu (2017)

No.	Title	Lyrics	Singer(s)	Length
1.	"Pesayum Esaya"	Vivek	Vandana Srinivasan
2.	"Kuru Kuru Kannal Enna"	Kattalai Jaya	Justin Prabhakaran, Latha Krishna
3.	"Eldra Naanga Thaan"	Anthony Daasan	Anthony Daasan
