= Ekk Albela =

2016 Indian film by Shekhar Sartandel

- Theatrical release poster
- Directed by: Shekhar Sartandel
- Written by: Shekhar Sartandel; Amol Shetge
- Screenplay by: Shekhar Sartandel; Amol Shetge
- Produced by: Dr Monish Babre
- Starring: Mangesh Desai; Vidhyadhar Joshi
- Cinematography: Uday Devare
- Music by: Santosh Mulekar
- Production companies: Kimaya Motion Pictures; Manglmurti Films
- Distributed by: Raksha Entertainment; Manglmurti Films; Barakhadi Entertainments
- Release date: 24 June 2016
- Country: India
- Language: Marathi

Ekk Albela is a 2016 Indian Marathi language Biopic film, directed by Shekhar Sartandel and produced by Dr Monish Babre under the Kimaya Motion Pictures banner and presented by Manglmurti Films. The film is biopic on the life of legendary actor Bhagwan Abaji Palav popularly known as Bhagwan Dada The film released on 24 June 2016 and is the first ever Marathi film simultaneously released in India and UK.

The film stars Mangesh Desai in lead role as Bhagwan Dada and Vidya Balan in cameo role as Geeta Bali. The supporting cast features Vidhyadhar Joshi, Prasad Pandit, Swapnil Rajshekhar, Vighnesh Joshi, Shekhar Phadke, Shriram Kolhatkar and Arun Bhadsavle.

== Plot ==
The journey of Bhagwan Dada. A common man who rose to the top and became a legend in Indian Cinema.

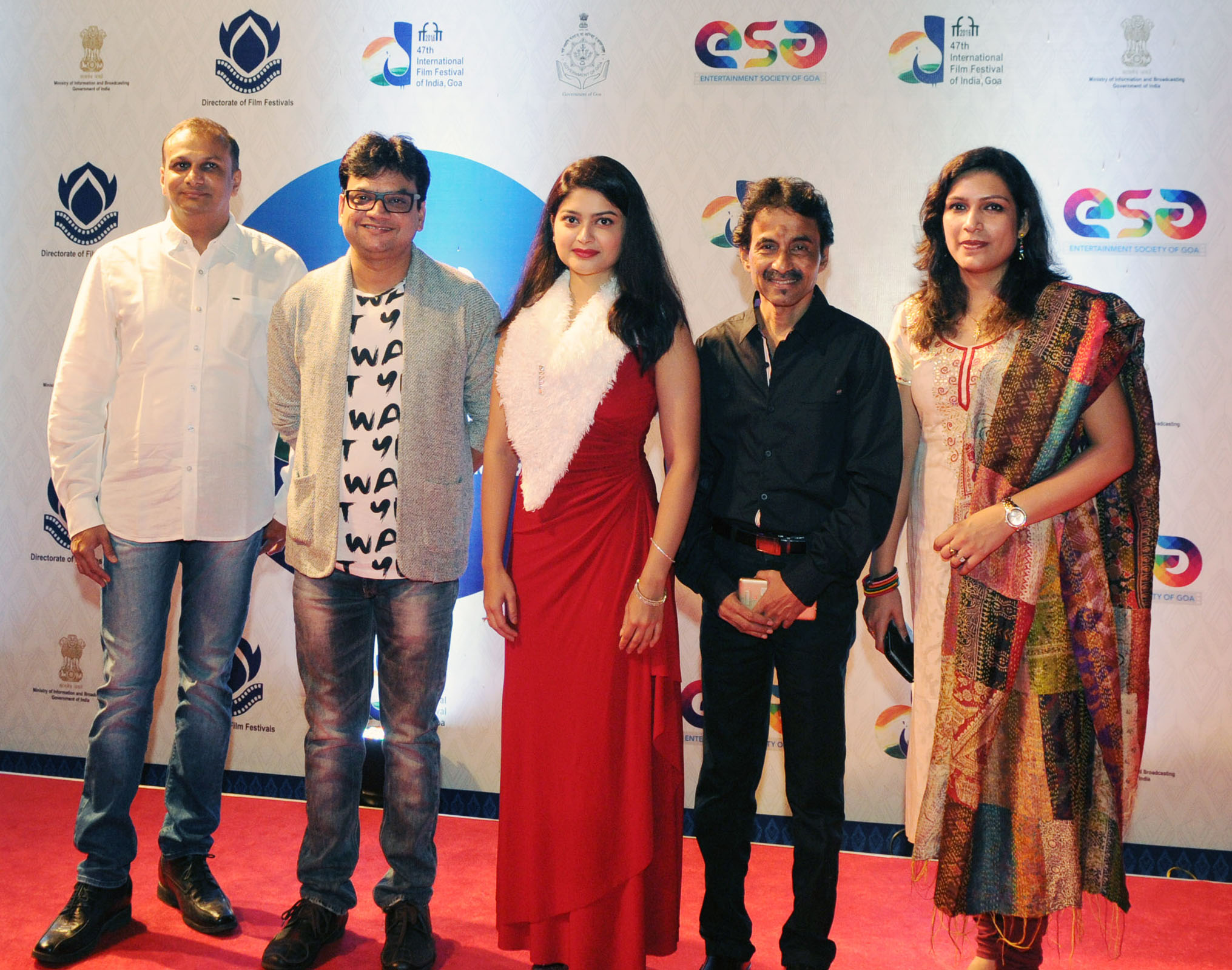
Film crew at IFFI (2016)

== Cast ==
- Mangesh Desai as Bhagwan Dada
- Vidya Balan as Geeta Bali (cameo)
- Vidhyadhar Joshi
- Herman Dsouza as Distributor Mr Punjwani
- Vaibhavi Shandilya as Shaheen
- Prasad Pandit
- Swapnil Rajshekhar
- Vighnesh Joshi
- Shahnawaz Pradhan
- Tejaswi Patil
- Nehaa Patil
- Shriram Kolhatkar
- Arun Bhadsavle
- Riyaaz Mulani
- Mannveer Choudharry as Rafiq
