= Sakka Podu Podu Raja (2017 film) =

- Official Theatrical Poster
- Directed by: G. L. Sethuraman
- Written by: G. L. Sethuraman
- Based on: Loukyam
- Produced by: VTV Ganesh
- Starring: Santhanam; Vaibhavi Shandilya; Vivek; Sanjana Singh; Sampath
- Cinematography: Abinandhan Ramanujam
- Edited by: Anthony
- Music by: Silambarasan
- Production company: VTV Productions
- Distributed by: Trident Arts; AP International
- Release date: 22 December 2017
- Country: India
- Language: Tamil

Sakka Podu Podu Raja is a 2017 Indian Tamil-language action comedy film directed by Sethuraman and produced by VTV Ganesh. The film features Santhanam, Vaibhavi Shandilya and Vivek in the leading roles. Featuring cinematography by Abinandhan Ramanujam and edited by Anthony, the film began production in October 2016. This film is a remake of the 2014 Telugu movie Loukyam, starring Gopichand, Rakul Preet Singh, Sampath Raj (who reprises his role in this film), Mukesh Rishi and Brahmanandam. It was released in a Hindi dub in 2021, titled Santa, by RKD Studios.

== Plot ==
Santa helps his friend Saravana elope with his lover, who happens to be the sister of a local don, Bhavani. Knowing this, Bhavani vows to take revenge on Santa and keeps searching for him. Meanwhile, Santa meets Yazhini, a college student, and gets attracted to her. After some initial fights, Yazhini also falls for Santa. One day, Yazhini is chased by a few goons and there comes Bhavani who saves her. It is revealed that Yazhini is the youngest sister of Bhavani, which shocks Santa. A small flashback is shown where there is an enmity prevailing between another don, Das, who wants to kill Bhavani’s sisters as Bhavani refused to marry Das’ only sister, which led to her death.

Santa comes up with a plan to win the heart of Bhavani. As Bhavani has not seen Santa, he decides to use it as an advantage. As per plan, Santa introduces Bhavani as a land lord and lets him stay at his place. Santa gets close to Bhavani, and stages another drama, and makes Bhavani accept the wedding of Saravana and Bhavani’s sister. Bhavani arranges Yazhini’s wedding with Karthik, who was supposed to marry Yazhini’s sister. Now, Santa finds that Karthik is none other than the son of Das, and their plan is to trouble Yazhini post wedding as a means of revenge against Bhavani. A fight ensues, and Bhavani understands Das’ plan. Finally, Santa is married to Yazhini.

== Cast ==
- Santhanam as Santa
- Vaibhavi Shandilya as Yazhini
- Vivek as Delhi
- Sampath as Bhavani (Yazhini's Biological brother)
- Sanjana Singh as Hamsa (Delhi's wife)
- Narayan as Karthik
- V.T.V. Ganesh as J. Neelakandan, Santa's father
- Dr. Sethuraman as Saravana
- Sharath Lohitashwa as Kasimedu Das
- Ashmita Singh as Das' Sister
- Powerstar Srinivasan as Srinivasan
- Natraj Pillai as Sathya, Yazhini’s adopted brother
- Surekha Vani as Neelakandan's wife
- Robo Shankar as Sathya's henchman
- Daniel Pope as Santa's friend
- Swaminathan as Raghava Chari, Santa's uncle
- Mayilswamy as Vastu
- Papri Ghosh as Yamini
- Rajkumar as Santa's friend
- Aryan as Ravi
- 'Lollu Sabha' Anthony
- Lollu Sabha Maaran as Film crew member
- Abhishek Vinod
- Divya Ganesh as Yazhini's college friend
- Niharika as Yazhini's college friend
- Adithya Kathir
- Kanal Kannan in a special appearance as himself
- Sridhar special appearance in the song "Kalakku Machaan"
- Dinesh special appearance in the song "Kalakku Machaan"
- Nobel Paul special appearance in the song "Kalakku Machaan"
- Jhony special appearance in the song "Kalakku Machaan"
- Boopathy special appearance in the song "Kalakku Machaan"

== Production ==
In October 2016, VTV Ganesh announced that he would finance a film directed by newcomer Sethuraman, which would feature Santhanam and Vaibhavi Shandilya in the lead roles. The film was launched with a small ceremony during the middle of the month and the lead pair in attendance. In early November 2016, it was announced that production had begun and Ganesh had signed on comedian Vivek to play a supporting role, while Sampath Raj and Robo Shankar joined the cast.

In November 2016, the team approached A. R. Rahman to work on the film as music composer. After the composer turned down the request, VTV Ganesh also enquired with Anirudh Ravichander before signing on Harris Jayaraj. Later, Santhanam announced that actor STR will make his debut as composer in the film. Sharing the news on his Twitter page on Sunday, Santhanam wrote: "It's my godfather and wonderful human Silambarasan, who is going to compose music for first time for this film 'Sakka Podu Podu Raja'."

== Soundtrack ==
Music for the movie was composed by Silambarasan, in his debut as a music composer. The movie consists of a total of 5 songs.

No	Song name	Singer(s)	Lyrics	Length
1	"Kalakku Machaan"	Anirudh Ravichander	Rokesh	3:58
2	"Kadhal Devathai"	Yuvan Shankar Raja	Vairamuthu	6:17
3	"Unakkaga"	Leon James, Dr. Burn, Andrea Jeremiah	Dr. Burn, Vignesh Shivan	4:18
4	"Siru Siru"	Keerthana Vaidyanathan, Vasudev Krishna	Karunakaran	5:28
5	"Vaa Munimma"	Usha Rajendar, T. Rajendar	Madhan Karky	4:35

== Reception ==
Baradwaj Rangan of Film Companion wrote "Santhanam’s latest attempt to position himself as a matinee idol pivots on an utterly original plot: the hero falls for a gangster’s sister. "

== Home media ==
Amazon has acquired the digital rights of Sakka Podu Podu Raja.
