= Masters (film) =

2012 film by Johny Antony

- Film poster
- Directed by: Johny Antony
- Written by: Jinu V. Abraham
- Produced by: Sarath Chandran
- Starring: Prithviraj Sukumaran; M. Sasikumar
- Cinematography: Madhu Neelakandan
- Edited by: Ranjan Abraham
- Music by: Gopi Sundar
- Production company: Sincere Cinema
- Distributed by: Seven Arts International
- Release date: 30 March 2012
- Running time: 144 minutes
- Country: India
- Language: Malayalam
- Budget: ₹4 crore
- Box office: ₹10 crore

Masters is a 2012 Malayalam-language action crime film directed by Johny Antony and written by Jinu V. Abraham. It stars Prithviraj Sukumaran and M. Sasikumar in the lead roles while an ensemble cast including Mukesh, Siddique, Vijayaraghavan, Biju Menon, Salim Kumar, Shammi Thilakan, Jagathy Sreekumar, Sandhya, Mithra Kurian, Ananya, Piaa Bajpai, Irshad and Sai Kumar. This film is loosely based on the English film Strangers on a Train.

Masters was released on 30 March 2012 and became a commercial success at the box office. The film marks the debut of M. Sasikumar in Malayalam cinema. It also marks the debut (as a child artist) of Love Today-famed actress Ivana. The movie was shot in various parts of Kottayam especially the climax scene in St Berchmans College, Changanasserry.

== Plot ==
Milan Paul and Sreeramakrishnan alias Sree are best friends who have been together since college. The intensity of their friendship has not faded though their carefree college days are long gone. Sree is now an ASP of Kottayam and Milan is a renowned reporter in the same city. Though in different fields with demanding roles, they use their bond to fulfill social responsibilities. Sree is short-tempered and impulsive and usually ends up in some sort of trouble, but Milan bails him out every time.

Consequently, Milan has to deal with Sree's enemies, but Sree reciprocates by saving Milan. Things were going well until a series of suicide murders happened and there is a lack of any apparent reason for the killers to kill the victims, which bewilders the police. In many cases, the killers have not met the victims ever before the incident. It is then revealed that all those who have the crimes have exchanged their enemies and were those who got injustice due to society.

Sree learns that Milan was also with the suicide murderers, and he learns from a suicide killer named Sethunanthan that the last target is a corrupt Advocate Narayanan Thambi. Milan reveals to Sree that Narayanan insulted Milan's mother Mary Paulose, which led to her death. Sree saves Narayanan from Milan by defeating him and consoles him stating that he needs him, but Narayanan kills Milan with Sree's gun and shoots Sree in his chest. Angered, Sree kills Narayanan, thus avenging Milan's death.

== Cast ==
- Prithviraj Sukumaran as ASP Sreeramakrishnan IPS
- M. Sasikumar as Milan Paul (voiceover by Sudheesh)
- Mukesh as SP Ravi Shanker IPS
- Biju Menon as Sethu Nathan
- Pia Bajpai as Daksha Das
  - Ivana as Young Daksha
- Ananya as Ashley Jacob
- Geetha as Mythiri, Daksha's mother
- Mithra Kurian as Sheetal Monachan
- Sandhya as Nia Punnoose
- Salim Kumar as Monachan
- Jagathy Sreekumar as Kunnanthanam Devassy
- Saikumar as Advocate Narayanan Thambi
- Vijayaraghavan as Balagangadharan
- Siddique as Issac Panicker
- Irshad as Sam George Pallath
- Shammi Thilakan as Roy
- Surekha as Lizy Monachan
- Nisha Sarang as Smitha, Roy's wife
- Mohan Jose as Kelu
- Kalabhavan Shajohn as Driver Santhosh
- Chembil Ashokan as Achankunju
- Sasi Kalinga as Pappachan
- Abdul Majeed as Roy's advocate
- Janaki Krishnan as Shikha Monachan
- Sreelakshmi V as Sudhakshina, Daksha's sister
- Jyothi Krishna as Mary Paulose, Milan's mother
- Anil Murali as SI Kabeer Muhammad
- Bhagath Manuel as Akhil
- Sadiq as CI Bineesh
- Manikandan Pattambi as Mukhapadam Sudharman
- Sunil Sukhada as Father
- Roslin as Nun
- Mahesh as Prof. Alex Zacaria
- Santhakumari as Milan's grandmother
- Naseer Sankranthi as Thomachan, Roy's Driver
- Kalabhavan Rahman as Monachan's friend
- Kazan Khan as Yakub
- Nandu as Advocate Shaji Mathew
- Murali as Sivadas, Daksha's father (Photo Presence)
- Samuthirakani as Protester (special appearance in "Suhruth Suhruth")

== Production ==
The film started its shooting in August 2011 at Kottayam, Kerala. The entire climax scene was shot in St Berchmans College, Changanasserry.The soundtrack is scored by Gopi Sundar along with lyrics by Shibu Chakravarthi. Masters is produced under the banner of Sincere Cinemas by B. Sarath Chandran and distributed by Seven Arts International.

== Reception ==
Masters received positive response from critics.

Nowrunning wrote "The film has all the makings of a commercial potboiler that should see it sailing smoothly through the box office seas for a while. Way too superior to the generic thrillers being churned out by the dozen, 'Masters' is a cool chiller for this summer, that delivers its jolt moments with aplomb." Metromatinee rated the film as "watchable" and praised that "the lead actors look refreshingly different and capable of carrying the movie on their shoulders. The story and the dialogues are lively and thrilling at some level, background music is peppy, action scenes are appropriate and the whole package will appeal to the viewers of all ages. On the whole 'Masters' has blended well to make a neat racy entertainer". Theatrebalcony remarked that it is "a good one time watch, if you can just pass out the first half for some good performance, great climax and clever story in the second half. And I should love to tell, this may end up as one of the good police story in the recent times."

== Soundtrack ==
Tracklist
No.	Title	Lyrics	Singer(s)	Length
1.	"Theme Music"	Shibu Chakravarthy	Gopi Sunder	3:34
2.	"Suhruth Suhruth"	Shibu Chakravarthy	Rahul Nambiar	3:42
Total length:				7:16
