= Let's Get Married (2023 film) =

2023 Indian film

- Theatrical release poster
- Directed by: Ramesh Thamilmani
- Produced by: Sakshi Singh Dhoni; Vikas Hasija; Sharmila J. Rajaa; M.V.M Velmohan
- Starring: Harish Kalyan; Nadhiya; Ivana
- Cinematography: Viswajith Odukkathil
- Edited by: Pradeep E. Ragav
- Music by: Ramesh Thamilmani
- Production company: Dhoni Entertainment
- Distributed by: Sakthi Film Factory
- Release date: 28 July 2023
- Running time: 151 minutes
- Country: India
- Language: Tamil

Let's Get Married is a 2023 Indian Tamil-language romantic comedy film directed by Ramesh Thamilmani in his directorial debut. It stars Harish Kalyan, Nadhiya and Ivana with Yogi Babu and RJ Vijay in supporting roles. It was produced by Dhoni Entertainment, owned by former Indian cricketer Mahendra Singh Dhoni.

The film was announced in October 2022, without a title, which was announced in January 2023. Principal photography commenced in January 2023 and wrapped in May 2023. The film has music composed by Ramesh Thamilmani, cinematography handled by Vishwajith Odukkathil and editing by Pradeep E. Ragav. It was released on 28 July 2023.

== Plot ==
The movie begins with Gautham, a software engineer, proposing marriage to his colleague and girlfriend Meera during their second love anniversary, with Meera agreeing to the proposal. Gautham's widowed mother, Leela, meets Meera's parents to finalise the matrimonial alliance, but when Meera realises that Gautham expects her to live in his home along with Leela post marriage, she calls off the wedding, leaving Gautham and Leela angry and frustrated. Meera eventually reconciles with Gautham and agrees to the marriage on one condition; she wants to go on a trip to Coorg with her family as well as Gautham's family so that both families, particularly she and Leela, can interact and get to know each other well before the marriage. If she is not able to get along with Leela during the trip, she and Gautham would part ways. While Gautham agrees to the condition, he lies to his mother that he is taking her on an "office trip" with his colleagues, due to which he is forced to take his best friend Vijay with him.

The trip begins and it soon becomes evident that Leela is not comfortable with Meera and her family also being part of the trip, but Gautham manages to pacify her and claiming that Meera is also part of the trip as his colleague. However, she eventually finds out the real reason of the trip from Meera, who is upset at the families not getting along, causing Gautham's lie to be exposed. Angry at Gautham for lying to them, Meera and Leela send their families, including Gautham and Vijay, back home, while both of them decide to spend time together and get to know each other. They head to Goa (which was initially proposed by Meera before settling on Coorg due to Gautham's objections) where they do many activities together and enjoy each other's company. After a few incidents, Leela is impressed with Meera and agrees to get her married to Gautham. But while returning to Coorg, they become lost in the middle of a forest.

In the forest, Meera and Leela get caught in a tiger trap and are captured by smugglers, who hold them, along with a tiger, in a van. Leela and Meera quarrel, blaming each other for their predicament, but they reconcile when Meera finds out about Leela's asthma as well as how Leela had struggled to raise Gautham as a single mother, sacrificing all her desires, as her husband, an army officer, died soon after Gautham was born. Leela also reveals her real intention to get Gautham married; to get rid of him finally and fulfill all her desires, including visiting temples; and agrees to Meera's desire for her and Gautham to live separately after marriage. Meanwhile, Gautham and Vijay, who are searching for Meera and Leela instead of returning home, find out that they are lost in the forest. With the help of a local forest officer, they manage to trace the smuggler's van and rescue both Meera and Leela, as well as the tiger.

Gautham, Meera and Leela return home, where Meera agrees to marry Gautham. Leela too agrees to the wedding, under one condition; the three of them should undertake another trip together.

== Cast ==
- Harish Kalyan as Gautham
- Nadhiya as Leela
- Ivana as Meera
- Yogi Babu as Mahindra
- RJ Vijay as Vijay
- Venkat Prabhu as Company MD
- VTV Ganesh as KFS ranger
- Srinath as Deepa's husband
- Janaki Sabesh as Meera's mother
- Mohan Vaidya as Meera's father
- Vinodhini Vaidyanathan as Deepa
- Deepa Shankar as Selvi
- Kathadi Ramamurthy as Meera's grandfather
- Sandy as Guruji's follower
- Vikkals Vikram as Vikram
- Supergood Subramani as Astrologer
- 96 Gowtham Raj as Astrologer's assistant

== Production ==
In mid-May 2022, former cricket player MS Dhoni was reported to make his film industry debut by producing a project starring Nayanthara in the lead role. That September, Vijay and Mahesh Babu were reported to act together in the project. On 26 October, the company made a public announcement, stating that the project would be directed by debutant Ramesh Thamilmani. On 27 January 2023, Harish Kalyan and Ivana were announced as the lead actors. The title of the film was also announced. Principal photography began on 27 January 2023. Shooting mostly happened in Chennai. Principal photography wrapped on 1 May.

== Music ==
Let's Get Married

Soundtrack album by Ramesh Thamilmani
- Released: 2023
- Studio: RT Studio
- Genre: Feature film soundtrack
- Length: 13:20
- Language: Tamil
- Producer: Ramesh Thamilmani

Ramesh Thamilmani chronology
Let's Get Married (2023)	Kadhal Conditions Apply (2023)

Singles from Let's Get Married
- 1. "Salana" Released: 15 June 2023; 2. "Grill Chicken" Released: 11 July 2023

The music for the film was composed by Ramesh Thamilmani. The first single "Salana" was released on 15 June 2023, and the second single "Grill Chicken" on 11 July.

Track listing
No.	Title	Lyrics	Singer(s)	Length
1.	"Salana"	Madhan Karky	Adithya RK	2:58
2.	"Grill Chicken"	Gana Vinoth	Gana Vinoth	2:49
3.	"Kaattu Payapulla"	Madhan Karky, Paal Dabba	Anthony Daasan, Paal Dabba	2:49
4.	"Tikki Tikki Tata"	Madhan Karky	Nithyasree Venkatramanan, Madhu Iyer	3:23
5.	"Is Kis Kifa"	Madhan Karky	Ramesh Thamilmani	2:41
Total length:				13:20

== Release ==
The film was released on 28 July 2023.

== Reception ==
Logesh Balachandran of The Times of India gave the film 2 out of 5 stars and wrote, "It's just yet another below average romantic drama that gives nothing to take back home." Janani K of India Today gave it 1 out of 5 stars and considered the film to be a poorly made romantic drama that serves as the right example of "not all good ideas make it great on the table".

Meera Venugopal of Mirchi Plus gave it 2 out of 5 stars and wrote, "LGM, M.S. Dhoni's maiden feature production, had the meat to become a great rom-com if fleshed out. But with zero effort in the writing, music, cinematography, and music departments, we are left with a cringe-fest." Pechi Aavudaiyappan of ABP Nadu gave the film a mixed review and noted that the film is a disappointment.
