= Raj Vishnu =

2017 Kannada film by K. Madesh

Raj Vishu
- Poster
- Directed by: K Madesh
- Screenplay by: Janardhana Maharshi
- Story by: Ponram
- Based on: Rajini Murugan by Ponram
- Produced by: Ramu
- Starring: Sharan; Chikkanna; Vaibhavi Shandilya; Srinivasa Murthy; Bhajharangi Loki
- Cinematography: Rajesh Katta
- Edited by: K. M. Prakash
- Music by: Arjun Janya
- Production company: Ramu Films
- Distributed by: Ramu Films
- Release date: 4 August 2017
- Running time: 159 minutes
- Country: India
- Language: Kannada

Raj Vishnu is a 2017 Indian Kannada-language comedy film directed by K. Madesh and produced by Ramu. The film has Sharan and Chikkanna in the lead roles, while Vaibhavi Shandilya, Srinivasa Murthy and Bhajharangi Loki play supporting roles. The film features music composed by Arjun Janya and cinematography by Rajesh Katta.

The film is a remake of the Tamil film Rajini Murugan (2016) directed by Ponram and starring Sivakarthikeyan, Keerthy Suresh, and Soori.

== Plot ==
Rajini Murugan is an unemployed youth from Madurai who spends his days roaming around with his best friend Thotathree and supplying food to his grandfather Ayyankalai, a highly respected gentleman who has large properties of land. Ayyankalai wants to divide all his properties among his children and grandchildren, but except Rajini Murugan and his father Malligarajan, who is the headmaster of the local school, the rest of the family is settled abroad and never visit Madurai.

Meanwhile, following the advice of an astrologer (who claimed that Rajini Murugan will get married and be rich within three months), Rajini Murugan starts wooing his childhood sweetheart Karthika Devi. Karthika's father Neelakandan, an ardent fan of Rajinikanth, was the best friend of Malligarajan and had given Rajini Murugan his name when he was born, but fell out with Malligarajan and his family due to a misunderstanding involving Rajini Murugan and Karthika when they were children. Since then, Rajini Murugan and Karthika are not on speaking terms, and Neelakandan forbids any sort of contact between the two. Nevertheless, Rajini Murugan opens a tea stall outside Karthika's house to stay close to her and follows her day and night. The stall is later destroyed by a customer who pulls down the shop in the process of taking a banana. Later, he and Thothathree start a real estate company. A gangster "Ezhrai" Mookan, whose only work is to extort ₹100,000 from businessmen, tries to swindle the same amount from Rajini Murugan, but fails and ends up paying ₹100,000 to him.

Ayyankalai, who is fed up with Rajini Murugan's antics, decides to immediately divide his properties so that Rajini Murugan can benefit from his share of the property. He fakes his death, which forces his children and grandchildren to come to Madurai. Mookan claims that he too is a grandson of Ayyankalai (through the son of Ayyankalai's first wife) and starts demanding his share of the property. This leads to confrontation between Rajini Murugan and Mookan and their feud is soon brought before the panchayat. The panchayat declares the verdict in favour of Ayyankalai and Rajini Murugan. Mookan, accepting defeat, receives ₹100,000 from Rajini Murugan as compensation. It is then revealed that Mookan staged the whole drama to get back his ₹100,000 from Rajini Murugan. Meanwhile, Karthika accepts Rajini Murugan's love and Neelakandan also begins to approve their relationship.

In the end, Ayyankalai reveals that he does have a grandson through his first wife's son. The grandson is revealed to be none other than Bosepandi from Varuthapadatha Valibar Sangam. Bosepandi refuses to accept his share of his grandfather's property, advising him and his family not to sell the property and instead convert it into a 5-star hotel and hand it over to Rajini Murugan. Ayyankalai and Rajini Murugan agree with him.

== Cast ==
- Sharan as Raj-Vishnu
- Chikkanna as Shankar Nag
- Vaibhavi Shandilya as Lavanya
- Srinivasa Murthy as Sanjeevappa
- Sadhu Kokila
- Veena Sundar
- Mimicry Gopi
- Saurav Lokesh
- Sriimurali (special appearance)

== Production ==
=== Casting ===
Actor Ambareesh was initially signed in to play the grandfather's role which was portrayed by Rajkiran in the original. However, due to undisclosed reasons, he was replaced by another senior actor Srinivasa Murthy. Rachita Ram and Sruthi Hariharan were among the forerunners for the lead female role, which went to the Malayalam actress Remya Nambeesan. However, she was subsequently replaced by Vaibhavi Shandilya. Her role was said to be a "feisty one", which included the character performing some street fights with other women. Sriimurali was roped in to play a special cameo.

== Soundtrack ==
Raj Vishnu

Soundtrack album by Arjun Janya
- Released: 23 June 2017
- Genre: Feature film soundtrack
- Language: Kannada
- Label: Anand Audio
- Producer: Arjun Janya

Arjun Janya chronology
Pataki (2017)	Raj Vishnu (2017)	Chamak (2017)

The soundtrack was composed by Arjun Janya with the lyrics written by Yogaraj Bhat, V. Nagendra Prasad and Kaviraj.

Track list
No.	Title	Singer(s)	Length
1.	"Rajvishnu"	Vijay Prakash	4:51
2.	"Dhool Yebbusu"	Santhosh Venky, Sangeetha Rajeev	4:31
3.	"Tea Angadi Munde"	Vyasaraj	4:55
4.	"Lavanya Kai Kottbitta"	Ravindra Soragavi	4:23
5.	"Suvvanna Suvvanaare"	Indu Nagaraj	4:42

== Release ==
The film was released on 4 August 2017. A month after its release, the film was premiered on Udaya TV.
