= Thirudan Police =

2014 Indian film by Caarthick Raju

- Theatrical release poster for Thirudan Police
- Directed by: Caarthick Raju
- Written by: Caarthick Raju
- Produced by: S. P. B. Charan; J.Selvakumar
- Starring: Dinesh; Aishwarya Rajesh
- Cinematography: Siddharth
- Edited by: Praveen K. L. N. B. Srikanth
- Music by: Yuvan Shankar Raja
- Production companies: Capital Film Works; Kenanya Films
- Release date: 14 November 2014
- Running time: 119 minutes
- Country: India
- Language: Tamil

Thirudan Police (transl. Thief and Police) is a 2014 Indian Tamil language action comedy film, directed by debutant Caarthick Raju. Produced by S. P. B. Charan in collaboration with J. Selvakumar of Kenanya films, the film has Dinesh and Aishwarya Rajesh in the lead, while Bala Saravanan, Nithin Sathya, John Vijay and Rajendran play supporting roles. The music is composed by Yuvan Shankar Raja, According to the director, the film is about a son exacting revenge for his father's death. The film was launched in December 2013 and released on 14 November 2014. The film was remade in Telugu as Sapthagiri Express with Sapthagiri and in Kannada as Kiladi Police with Harish Raj.

== Cast ==
- Dinesh as Vishwa
- Aishwarya Rajesh as Poornima
- Bala Saravanan as Constable Vanagamudi
- Nithin Sathya as Ravi
- Rajendran as Manickam
- John Vijay as Maravattai
- Aadukalam Naren as Police Commissioner Ramachandran
- Rajesh as Head constable Singaram
- Renuka as Radha
- Vazhakku En Muthuraman as ACP Ekambaram
- Uma Padmanabhan as Rani
- Krishnamoorthy as Writer
- Rajendranath as Jailer Subramanian
- Robo Chandru as Head Constable
- Hello Kandasamy as Tea Stall Owner
- Vaiyapuri (Guest appearance)
- S. P. Balasubrahmanyam as Professor (Guest appearance)
- Vijay Sethupathi as Vinayagam (Guest appearance)
- Aruldoss as Councilor (Guest appearance)

== Production ==
Caarthick Raju stated "For 14 years, I have been involved in visual effects and computer graphics for several films. Then came a stage when I wanted to do something more creative. With encouragement from my friend, cinematographer Velraj, I started writing scripts and learning about direction. When the time was right, I approached S. P. B. Charan for whom I had earlier worked on visual effects, and he showed a keen interest in the concept I had built into my script". The director stated that the film is about a son exacting revenge for his father's death and that the story is "how hide-and-seek continues to be played in adulthood when a thief and a cop come head-to-head". While Dinesh was signed to play the son, "a carefree boy with no responsibilities" who later becomes a police officer, Rajesh was cast as the father. Dinesh was reported to appear in four looks and was trained by a constable friend to get his body language right for the policeman's role. Shruti Hassan was signed to play the role of a college student, whose father is a sub-inspector.

The team traveled to Kodaikanal to shoot a duet song featuring Dinesh and Iyshwarya. It was shot in a few hilly locations, about 25 km away from Kodaikanal. Vijay Sethupathi has danced for the Kuthu number, "Ennoda Vaa (kutthaattam Podu)" from the film. The song was shot at Kerala House, near VGP in Chennai.

== Soundtrack ==
Thirudan Police

Soundtrack album by Yuvan Shankar Raja
- Released: 10 July 2014
- Recorded: 2013–14
- Genre: Feature film soundtrack
- Length: 18:57
- Language: Tamil
- Label: Think Music
- Producer: Yuvan Shankar Raja

Yuvan Shankar Raja chronology
Vanavarayan Vallavarayan (2013)	Thirudan Police (2014)	Anjaan (2014)

The film's soundtrack was composed by Yuvan Shankar Raja. The album features five tracks and was released on 10 July 2014 at Sathyam Cinemas, Chennai. The song "Moodupanikkul" was one of the song originally composed by Yuvan Shankar Raja for the film Aaranya Kaandam that was also produced by S. P. Charan and that eventually released without any songs. Besides Charan two Airtel Super Singer contestants, Hariharasudhan and Pooja Vaidyanath, had also sung for Thirudan Police's soundtrack.

Track-List
No.	Title	Lyrics	Singer(s)	Length
1.	"Ennodu Vaa"	Na. Muthukumar	Sathyan, Senthildass Velayutham, Priyadarshini	4:29
2.	"Moodupanikkul"	Vaali	Naresh Iyer, Roshini	3:57
3.	"Pesadhe"	Na. Muthukumar	Hariharasudhan, Pooja Vaidyanath	4:43
4.	"Dheivam (Version 1)"	Na. Muthukumar	Haricharan	2:54
5.	"Dheivam (Version 2)"	Na. Muthukumar	S. P. Charan	2:54
Total length:				18:57

=== Reception ===
The soundtrack received positive response. The Times of India gave it a rating of 3 stars and wrote, "Yuvan Shankar Raja's previous albums didn't really strike a chord with the listeners, but this one looks quite promising. Yuvan has kept his trademark compositions yet gives a fresh feel to this five-track album".

== Critical reception ==
The movie has mostly received positive reviews from critics. IANS gave the film 3.5 stars out of 5 and wrote, "Thirudan Police is your average revenge drama that gets salvaged by some great comedy, the kind audiences don't mind paying for....(it)shows how comedy can do wonders in a story if one knows how to use it". Rediff gave 3 stars out of 5 and wrote, "He (Caarthick Raju) has cleverly refined in every element, be it action, comedy, romance or emotion, keeping it light, interesting and highly entertaining", calling the film "a delight to watch" and "definitely a commendable effort". Sify called the film "a nice fun ride" and further added, "It is well-written comedy entertainer which also has a strong emotional story about the bonding between a father and son. And also an entertaining hide and seek thriller featuring a cop with a vengeance". Deccan Chronicle gave a rating of 2.5 stars and wrote, "For a debut directorial venture, Caarthick Raju's Thirudan Police is a commendable end product that manages to prop itself up as an entertaining thriller with a smidgen of comedy mixed in".

Baradwaj Rangan wrote, "the film's biggest (and nicest) surprise is that this revenge drama is treated like a comedy. Thirudan Police pees all over that most hallowed of tropes: the love for a parent. The upshot is that the narrative has no real emotional charge – but that's fine. The trouble is that this one-note gag (about Vishwa's father) is stretched out too long. Also, there are tonal issues...but the real problem is when the film gets all serious on us. But the climax is such fun that we forget what came earlier". The Hindu wrote, "Caarthick Raju's real strength is comedy. A Ramarajan-style punch quite early in the film...signals this. The climax sequences confirm it. You're happily willing to suspend all disbelief when the scenes are as funny as they are at the end... As you walk out, you can't but wonder if the director, after noting all the laughter at the end, rues his decision not to have made a full-fledged comedy". The Times of India gave 3 stars out of 5 and wrote, "Thirudan Police wants to be a sentimental story as well as a comedy. The tone is uneven – one moment we are asked to get sentimental and then in the next, we are told to laugh. This is jarring, as is the manner in which the film turns from an emotional father-son tale to a comedy. To the director's credit, he does this with confidence that we begin to enjoy the humour after initially feeling disconcerted".
