= Dinesh =

- Gender: Male

Origin
- Meaning: "lord of the day", "Sun" in vedic language
- Region of origin: South Asia

Dinesh (Devanagari: दिनेश dineśa) is a common Hindu male given name. The Sanskrit word dineśa is a compound of dina 'day' and īśa 'lord', meaning 'day-lord', an epithet of the Sun. Notable people with the name include:

- Dinesh (choreographer), Indian choreographer
- Dinesh (Kannada actor), Indian film actor
- Dinesh Baboo, Indian film director, cinematographer, producer, actor and screenwriter
- Dinesh Chand, Fijian golfer
- Dinesh Chandimal, Sri Lankan cricketer
- Dinesh Chandra Sen, Indian researcher on Bengali folklore
- Dinesh D'Souza, Indian-American political commentator
- Dinesh Gunawardena, Sri Lankan politician
- Dinesh Gupta, Indian freedom fighter and revolutionary
- Dinesh Hingoo, Indian actor
- Dinesh Karthik, Indian cricketer
- Dinesh Lamba, Indian actor
- Dinesh Mongia, Indian cricketer
- Dinesh Nandan Sahay, Indian governor
- Dinesh Nayak, Indian Hockey player
- Dinesh Patel, Indian professional baseball player
- Dinesh Prasad Singh, Indian politician
- Dinesh Rambally, Trinidadian politician
- Dinesh Sharma, Indian politician
- Dinesh Singh, Indian politician
- Dinesh Singh, Punjab politician
- Dinesh Subasinghe, Sri Lankan composer, violinist and music producer
- Dinesh Vasu Dash, Singaporean politician
