= Caarthick Raju =

Tamil and Telugu film director

- Born: Karthik Raju
- Occupations: Director; screenwriter; computer graphics supervisor
- Years active: 2004–present

Caarthick Raju is an Indian film director and screenwriter who works in Telugu and Tamil films. He debuted as a director with the Tamil film Thirudan Police (2014) and continued with Telugu films Ninu Veedani Needanu Nene (2019) and Single (2025).

== Career ==
Raju has contributed visual effects to many films, including Mudhalvan (1999), Ghilli (2004), Pokkiri (2007), and Dasavathaaram (2008).

He debuted as a film director with Thirudan Police (2014) starring Dinesh, which according to him "encompasses elements of comedy, action, sentiment and horror". The film was based on short story by his father, and he made the film as a tribute to fathers. Regarding the film, a critic wrote that "Caarthick Raju's real strength is comedy. A Ramarajan-style punch quite early in the film...signals this. The climax sequences confirm it. You're happily willing to suspend all disbelief when the scenes are as funny as they are at the end... As you walk out, you can't but wonder if the director, after noting all the laughter at the end, rues his decision not to have made a full-fledged comedy". He worked on his next film Ulkuthu in 2015 also starring Dinesh, which was based on fisherman.

Caarthick Raju's cinematic journey continued with the Telugu supernatural thriller Ninu Veedani Needanu Nene, featuring Sundeep Kishan. This film was noticed for its storyline and visual effects, which created an eerie atmosphere. His next film Nene Naa (2024) was released to negative reviews. He next directed Single (2025) for Geetha Arts.

== Filmography ==
=== As director ===
Year	Title	Language
2014	Thirudan Police	Tamil
2017	Ulkuthu	Tamil
2019	Ninu Veedani Needanu Nene	Telugu
2023	Nene Naa	Telugu
2025	Single	Telugu

=== As Visual Effects Supervisor ===
Year	Title	Language	Notes
1999	Padayappa	Tamil	
1999	Kadhalar Dhinam	Tamil	
1999	Hindustan Ki Kasam	Hindi	
1999	Mudhalvan	Tamil	
2000	Sinbad: Beyond the Veil of Mists	English	
2000	Indriyam	Malayalam	
2000	Bharathi	Tamil	
2000	Raju Chacha	Hindi	
2000	Pandavas: The Five Warriors	English	
2001	Little John	Tamil; Hindi; English	
2001	Citizen	Tamil	
2001	Sri Manjunatha	Kannada	
2001	Nayak: The Real Hero	Hindi	
2002	Pammal K. Sambandam	Tamil	
2002	Ezhumalai	Tamil	
2002	Thamizhan	Tamil	
2002	Alibaba	English	
2003	Okkadu	Telugu	
2003	Ottran	Tamil	
2003	Boys	Tamil	
2003	Son of Aladdin	English	
2004	Arjun	Telugu	
2004	Varsham	Telugu	
2004	Anji	Telugu	
2004	Ghilli	Tamil	
2004	New	Tamil	
2004	Naani	Telugu	
2004	Madhurey	Tamil	
2004	M. Kumaran S/O Mahalakshmi	Tamil	
2004	The Legend of Buddha	English	
2005	Balu	Telugu	
2005	Nuvvostanante Nenoddantana	Telugu	
2005	Chandramukhi	Tamil	
2005	Sachien	Tamil	
2005	Subhash Chandra Bose	Telugu	
2005	Athadu	Telugu	
2005	Anbe Aaruyire	Tamil	
2005	Mazhai	Tamil	
2005	Shaadi No. 1	Hindi	
2005	Thotti Jaya	Tamil	
2006	Aathi	Tamil	
2006	Pasakiligal	Tamil	
2006	Happy	Telugu	
2006	Pokiri	Telugu	
2006	Malamaal Weekly	Hindi	
2007	Pokkiri	Tamil	
2008	Kuruvi	Tamil	
2008	Dasavathaaram	Tamil	first 40 minutes only
2009	Villu	Tamil	
2009	Wanted	Hindi	
