= Vaibhavi Shandilya =

Indian actress

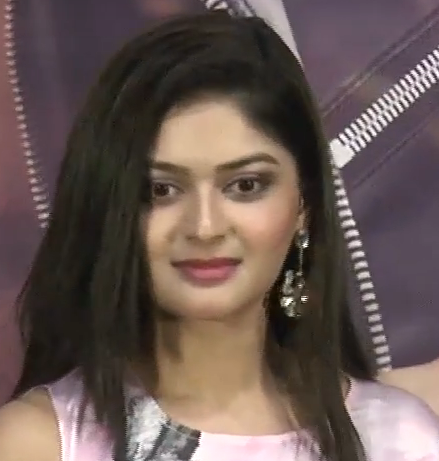
- Vaibhavi sandilya in 2017
- Born: 27 May 1993 (age 33)
- Occupation: Actress
- Years active: 2015–present

Vaibhavi Shandilya (born 27 May 1993) is an Indian actress who works in Tamil, Kannada and Marathi-language films. After making her debut in the Marathi film Janiva (2015), she has been in films including Ekk Albela (2015), Sakka Podu Podu Raja (2017), Iruttu Araiyil Murattu Kuththu (2018), Cap maari (2019) and Gaalipata 2 (2022).

== Career ==
Vaibhavi made her acting debut in the Marathi film Janiva (2015), a tale on social justice, which was noted for marking the debut of actor Mahesh Manjrekar's son, Sathya. Vaibhavi then featured amongst an ensemble cast including Vidya Balan in Bhagwan Dada's biopic, Ekk Albela where she portrayed a Muslim girl called Shaheen.

In 2016, Vaibhavi appeared in an Egyptian Arabic film Gahem Fe El Hend as a dancer in a song. It was choreographed by famous Indian dance choreographer Vishnu Deva. Vaibhavi signed on to appear in two Tamil language films opposite Santhanam — Server Sundaram and Sakka Podu Podu Raja, where the latter released in 2017 and the former remains unreleased. Vaibhavi signed her third Tamil film opposite Gautham Karthik in Iruttu Araiyil Murattu Kuththu in 2018. she debuted kannada industry with Raj Vishnu and acted in the movie Gaalipata 2 opposite Ganesh.

== Filmography ==
Key
†	Denotes films that have not yet been released

Year	Film	Role	Language	Notes
2015	Ekk Albela	Shaheen	Marathi	Debut in Marathi cinema
2016	Gahem Fe El Hend		Arabic	Debut in Egyptian cinema; special appearance in the song "Tak Dhinna"
2017	Sakka Podu Podu Raja	Yazhini	Tamil	Debut in Tamil cinema
2017	Raj Vishnu	Lavanya	Kannada	Debut in Kannada cinema
2017	Next Nuvve	Smita	Telugu	Debut in Telugu cinema
2018	Iruttu Araiyil Murattu Kuththu	Thendral	Tamil	
2019	Capmaari	Jenny	Tamil	
2022	Gaalipata 2	Shwetha	Kannada	
2024	Martin	Preeti	Kannada	

== Web series ==
Year	Title	Role	Language	Channel
2019	Nisha	Nisha	Tamil	ZEE5
2021	Chhatrasal	Devkunwari	Hindi	MX Player
